= 1982–83 Big East Conference men's basketball season =

American college basketball season

1982–83 Big East Conference Men's Basketball Season
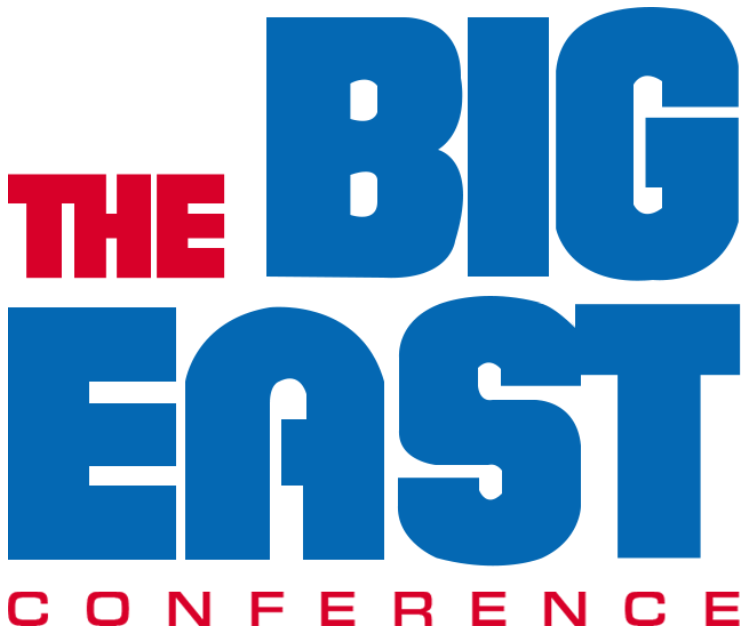
- League: NCAA Division I
- Sport: Basketball
- Duration: November 20, 1982 through March 12, 1983
- Teams: 9
- TV partner: ESPN

Regular Season
- Champion: Boston College, Villanova, and St. John's (12–4)
- Season MVP: Chris Mullin – St. John's

Tournament
- Champions: St. John's
- Finals MVP: Chris Mullin – St. John's

Basketball seasons
- 1981–82 1983–84

1982–83 Big East men's basketball standings
	Conf.				Overall
Team	W		L	PCT	W		L	PCT
No. 11 Boston College	12	–	4	.750	25	–	7	.781
No. 13 Villanova	12	–	4	.750	24	–	8	.750
No. 3 St. John's†	12	–	4	.750	28	–	5	.848
No. 20 Georgetown	11	–	5	.688	22	–	10	.688
Syracuse	9	–	7	.563	21	–	10	.677
Pittsburgh	6	–	10	.375	13	–	15	.464
Connecticut	5	–	11	.313	12	–	16	.429
Providence	4	–	12	.250	12	–	19	.387
Seton Hall	1	–	15	.063	6	–	23	.207
† 1983 Big East tournament winner Rankings from AP Poll

The 1982–83 Big East Conference men's basketball season was the fourth in conference history, and involved its nine full-time member schools.

Boston College, Villanova, and St. John's tied for the regular season championship with identical 12–4 records. St. John's was the champion of the Big East tournament.

== Season summary & highlights ==
- The Big East expanded to nine teams, adding Pittsburgh as a member.
- The addition of Pittsburgh lengthened the conference's regular season from 14 to 16 games for each member school.
- In a game at the Carrier Dome in Syracuse, New York, on December 11, 1982, Syracuse handed Houston's "Phi Slama Jama" team its first loss of the season, one of only three defeats Houston suffered all season.
- Rumors circulating since 1981 that Georgetown sophomore center Patrick Ewing lacked the intellect for the school and could not pass his classes led to opposing fans harassing him with taunts about his intelligence and race during Big East road games, carrying signs reading "EWING CAN'T READ THIS", "THINK EWING THINK", and "EWING IS AN APE", and throwing things such as banana peels at him on the court. During Georgetown's game at Syracuse before a sold-out crowd in the Carrier Dome on January 10, 1983, a fan threw an orange at Ewing while he was attempting a free throw, narrowly missing him and prompting Syracuse head coach Jim Boeheim to grab a microphone and tell the crowd that he would pull his team off the court and forfeit the game to Georgetown if such behavior continued.
- Boston College, Villanova, and St. John's tied for the regular season championship with identical 12–4 records. It was the second regular season championship for all three schools.
- St. John's won its first Big East tournament championship.
- The Big East tournament took place at Madison Square Garden in New York City for the first time, beginning a long-running association between the tournament and Madison Square Garden.

== Head coaches ==
School	Coach	Season	Notes
Boston College	Gary Williams	1st	
Connecticut	Dom Perno	6th	
Georgetown	John Thompson, Jr.	11th	
Pittsburgh	Roy Chipman	3rd	
Providence	Joe Mullaney	16th	
St. John's	Lou Carnesecca	15th	Big East Coach of the Year
Seton Hall	P. J. Carlesimo	1st	
Syracuse	Jim Boeheim	7th	
Villanova	Rollie Massimino	10th	

== Rankings ==
St. John's and Villanova were ranked in the Top 20 of the Associated Press poll for the entire season, and Georgetown was ranked in all but one weekly poll. Boston College and Syracuse also were ranked in the Top 20 during the season.

1982–83 Big East Conference Weekly Rankings Key: ██ Increase in ranking. ██ Decrease in ranking.
AP Poll	Pre	11/29	12/6	12/13	12/20	12/27	1/3	1/10	1/17	1/24	1/31	2/7	2/14	2/21	2/28	3/7	Final
Boston College													18	19	15	14	11
Connecticut																	
Georgetown	2	2	3	5	11	10	17		19	15	14	14	14	18	16	15	20
Pittsburgh																	
Providence																	
St. John's	19	12	12	9	7	7	7	3	8	7	5	7	6	9	10	8	3
Seton Hall																	
Syracuse				16	13	14	9	13	15	18	20	15	17	13	18	20	
Villanova	5	4	10	19	18	16	14	15	13	11	11	12	8	7	4	13	13

== Regular-season statistical leaders ==
Scoring
Name	School	PPG
Clyde Vaughan	Pitt	21.9
John Garris	BC	19.7
Chris Mullin	SJU	19.1
Ron Jackson	Prov	18.1
Erich Santifer	Syr	17.9

Rebounding
Name	School	RPG
Patrick Ewing	GU	10.2
Ed Pinckney	Vill	9.7
Clyde Vaughan	Pitt	9.2
Jay Murphy	BC	8.1
Otis Thorpe	Prov	8.0

Assists
Name	School	APG
Leo Rautins	Syr	6.2
Ricky Tucker	Prov	6.1
Stewart Granger	Vill	5.5
Michael Adams	BC	5.3
Bill Culbertson	Pitt	5.1

Steals
Name	School	SPG
Michael Adams	BC	2.8
Gene Smith	GU	2.1
Gene Waldron	Syr	1.9
Dominic Pressley	BC	1.8
Karl Hobbs	Conn	1.7

Blocks
Name	School	BPG
Patrick Ewing	GU	3.3
Ed Pinckney	Vill	2.1
John Garris	BC	1.9
Bill Wennington	SJU	0.9
Bruce Kuczenski	Conn	0.9

Field Goals
Name	School	FG%
Otis Thorpe	Prov	.636
Chris Mullin	SJU	.577
John Garris	BC	.573
Patrick Ewing	GU	.570
Erich Santifer	Syr	.568

Free Throws
Name	School	FT%
Chris Mullin	SJU	.878
John Pinone	Vill	.846
Michael Jackson	GU	.832
Karl Hobbs	Conn	.825
Michael Adams	BC	.809

== Postseason ==
=== Big East tournament ===
==== Seeding ====
Seeding in the Big East tournament was based on conference record, with tiebreakers applied as necessary. The eighth- and ninth-seeded teams played a first-round game, and the other seven teams received a bye into the quarterfinals.

The tournament's seeding was as follows: (1) Boston College, (2) Villanova, (3) St. John's, (4) Georgetown, (5) Syracuse, (6) Pittsburgh, (7) Connecticut, (8) Providence, (9) Seton Hall.

== Bracket ==
First round March 9, 1983
8	Providence	64
9	Seton Hall	73

Quarterfinals; March 10, 1983
1	#14 Boston College	79
9	Seton Hall	56
4	#15 Georgetown	72
5	#20 Syracuse	79
2	#13 Villanova	69
7	Connecticut	68
3	#8 St. John's	64
6	Pittsburgh	53

Semifinals; March 11, 1983
1	#14 Boston College	80
5	#20 Syracuse	74
2	#13 Villanova	80
3	#8 St. John's	91

Championship Game; March 12, 1983
1	#14 Boston College	77
3	#8 St. John's	85

=== NCAA tournament ===
Five Big East teams received bids to the NCAA Tournament, with St. John's seeded No. 1 in the East Region. Georgetown and Syracuse both lost in the second round, Boston College and St. John's in the regional semifinals, and Villanova in the Midwest Region final.

School	Region	Seed	Round 1	Round 2	Sweet 16	Elite 8
Villanova	Midwest	3	Bye	11 Lamar, W 60–58	7 Iowa, W 55–54	1 Houston, L 89–71
St. John's	East	1	Bye	9 Rutgers, W 66–55	4 Georgia, L 70–67	
Boston College	West	4	Bye	12 Princeton, W 51–42	1 Virginia, L 95–92	
Georgetown	Midwest	5	12 Alcorn State, W 68–63	4 Memphis State, L 66–57		
Syracuse	East	6	11 Morehead State, W 74–59	3 Ohio State, L 79–74		

=== National Invitation Tournament ===
No Big East teams received bids to the National Invitation Tournament.

== Awards and honors ==
=== Big East Conference ===
Player of the Year:

- Chris Mullin, St. John's, F, So.

Defensive Player of the Year:

- Patrick Ewing, Georgetown, C, So.

Freshman of the Year:

- Earl Kelley, Connecticut, G

Coach of the Year:

- Lou Carnesecca, St. John's (15th season)

All-Big East First Team

- Patrick Ewing, Georgetown, C, So., 7 ft 0 in (213 cm), 240 lb (109 kg), Cambridge, Mass.
- Chris Mullin, St. John's, F, So., 6 ft 6 in (198 cm), 205 lb (93 kg), Brooklyn, N.Y.
- Erich Santifer, Syracuse, G, Sr., 6 ft 6 in (198 cm), 205 lb (93 kg), Ann Arbor, Mich.
- Ed Pinckney, Villanova, F, So., 6 ft 9 in (206 cm), 205 lb (93 kg), Bronx, N.Y.
- John Pinone, Villanova, F, Sr., 6 ft 8 in (203 cm), 230 lb (104 kg), Hartford, Conn.

All-Big East Second Team:

- Jay Murphy, St. John's, F, Jr., 6 ft 9 in (206 cm), 220 lb (100 kg), Meriden, Conn.
- John Garris, St. John's, F, Sr., 6 ft 8 in (203 cm), 205 lb (93 kg), Bridgeport, Conn.
- Michael Adams, Boston College, G, So., 5 ft 10 in (178 cm), 165 lb (75 kg), Hartford, Conn.
- David Russell, St. John's, F, Sr., 6 ft 7 in (201 cm), 215 lb (98 kg), New York, N.Y.
- Stewart Granger, Villanova, G, Sr., 6 ft 3 in (191 cm), 190 lb (86 kg), Montreal, Quebec, Canada

All-Big East Third Team:

- Clyde Vaughan, Pittsburgh, F, Jr., 6 ft 4 in (193 cm), 210 lb (95 kg), Mount Vernon, N.Y.
- Otis Thorpe, Providence, F, Jr., 6 ft 10 in (208 cm), 248 lb (112 kg), Boynton Beach, Fla.
- Ron Jackson, Providence, G, Sr., 6 ft 5 in (196 cm), 205 lb (93 kg), West Roxbury, Mass.
- Billy Goodwin, St. John's, F, Sr., 6 ft 5 in (196 cm), 220 lb (100 kg), New York, N.Y.
- Leo Rautins, Syracuse, F, Sr., 6 ft 8 in (203 cm), 215 lb (98 kg), Toronto, Ontario, Canada

Big East All-Freshman Team:

- Earl Kelley, Connecticut, G, Fr., 6 ft 1 in (185 cm), 177 lb (80 kg), New Haven, Conn.
- David Wingate, Georgetown, G, Fr., 6 ft 5 in (196 cm), 185 lb (84 kg), Baltimore, Md.
- Michael Jackson, Georgetown, G, Fr., 6 ft 2 in (188 cm), 183 lb (83 kg), Fairfax, Va.
- Andre McCloud, Seton Hall, F, Fr., 6 ft 6 in (198 cm), 210 lb (95 kg), Washington, D.C.
- Rafael Addison, Syracuse, F, Fr., 6 ft 7 in (201 cm), 215 lb (98 kg), Jersey City, N.J.

=== All-Americans ===
The following players were selected to the 1983 Associated Press All-America teams.

Consensus All-America team:

- Patrick Ewing, Georgetown, Key Stats: 17.7 ppg, 10.2 rpg, 3.2 bpg, 57.0 FG%, 565 points

First Team All-America:

- Patrick Ewing, Georgetown, Key Stats: 17.7 ppg, 10.2 rpg, 3.2 bpg, 57.0 FG%, 565 points

AP Honorable Mention

- Michael Adams, Boston College
- John Garris, Boston College
- Billy Goodwin, St. John's
- Stewart Granger, Villanova
- Earl Kelley, Connecticut
- Chris Mullin, St. John's
- Jay Murphy, Boston College
- Ed Pinckney, Villanova
- Leo Rautins, Syracuse
- David Russell, St. John's
- Erich Santifer, Syracuse
- Otis Thorpe, Providence
- Clyde Vaughan, Pittsburgh

== See also ==
- 1982–83 NCAA Division I men's basketball season
- 1982–83 Boston College Eagles men's basketball team
- 1982–83 Connecticut Huskies men's basketball team
- 1982–83 Georgetown Hoyas men's basketball team
- 1982–83 Pittsburgh Panthers men's basketball team
- 1982–83 St. John's Redmen basketball team
- 1982–83 Syracuse Orangemen basketball team
- 1982–83 Villanova Wildcats men's basketball team
