= Boston College Eagles men's basketball statistical leaders =

The Boston College Eagles men's basketball statistical leaders are individual statistical leaders of the Boston College Eagles men's basketball program in various categories, including points, rebounds, assists, steals, and blocks. Within those areas, the lists identify single-game, single-season, and career leaders. The Eagles represent Boston College in the NCAA's Atlantic Coast Conference.

Boston College began competing in intercollegiate basketball in 1904. However, the school's record book does not generally list records from before the 1950s, as records from before this period are often incomplete and inconsistent. Since scoring was much lower in this era, and teams played much fewer games during a typical season, it is likely that few or no players from this era would appear on these lists anyway.

The NCAA did not officially record assists as a stat until the 1983–84 season, and blocks and steals until the 1985–86 season, but Boston College's record books includes players in these stats before these seasons. These lists are updated through the end of the 2020–21 season.

== Scoring ==
Career
Rk	Player	Points	Seasons
1	Troy Bell	2,632	1999–00 2000–01 2001–02 2002–03
2	Craig Smith	2,349	2002–03 2003–04 2004–05 2005–06
3	Dana Barros	2,342	1985–86 1986–87 1987–88 1988–89
4	Bill Curley	2,102	1990–91 1991–92 1992–93 1993–94
5	Tyrese Rice	2,099	2005–06 2006–07 2007–08 2008–09
6	Jared Dudley	2,071	2003–04 2004–05 2005–06 2006–07
7	Danya Abrams	2,053	1993–94 1994–95 1995–96 1996–97
8	Bob Carrington	1,849	1972–73 1973–74 1974–75 1975–76
9	John Austin	1,845	1963–64 1964–65 1965–66
10	Jay Murphy	1,795	1980–81 1981–82 1982–83 1983–84

Season
Rk	Player	Points	Season
1	Troy Bell	781	2002–03
2	Jerome Robinson	725	2017–18
3	Dana Barros	723	1987–88
4	Dana Barros	692	1988–89
5	Troy Bell	691	2001–02
6	Bill Curley	681	1993–94
7	John Bagley	675	1981–82
8	John Austin	673	1964–65
9	Terry Driscoll	653	1968–69
10	Troy Bell	652	2000–01

Single game
Rk	Player	Points	Season	Opponent
1	John Austin	49	1963–64	Georgetown
2	Jerome Robinson	46	2017–18	Notre Dame
	Tyrese Rice	46	2007–08	North Carolina
	Terry Driscoll	46	1967–68	St. John's
	Jim Hooley	46	1961–62	Brandeis
6	Ky Bowman	44	2018–19	Hartford
7	John Austin	43	1964–65	Utah State
	Dana Barros	43	1988–89	Pittsburgh
9	Troy Bell	42	2001–02	Iowa State
	John Austin	42	1964–65	NYU

== Rebounds ==
Career
Rk	Player	Rebounds	Seasons
1	Craig Smith	1,114	2002–03 2003–04 2004–05 2005–06
2	Terry Driscoll	1,071	1966–67 1967–68 1968–69
3	Danya Abrams	1,029	1993–94 1994–95 1995–96 1996–97
4	Bill Curley	996	1990–91 1991–92 1992–93 1993–94
5	Willie Wolters	979	1964–65 1965–66 1966–67
6	Gerry Ward	947	1960–61 1961–62 1962–63
7	Jared Dudley	936	2003–04 2004–05 2005–06 2006–07
8	Steffon Mitchell	879	2017–18 2018–19 2019–20 2020–21
9	Bill Collins	857	1972–73 1973–74 1974–75 1975–76
10	Jay Murphy	763	1980–81 1981–82 1982–83 1983–84

Season
Rk	Player	Rebounds	Season
1	Terry Driscoll	498	1968–69
2	Phil Powell	495	1954–55
3	Willie Wolters	431	1965–66
4	Willie Wolters	354	1964–65
5	Gerry Ward	343	1961–62
6	Craig Smith	339	2005–06
7	Gerry Ward	323	1962–63
8	Terry Driscoll	322	1967–68
9	Bill Collins	311	1974–75
10	Bill Curley	305	1993–94

Single game
Rk	Player	Rebounds	Season	Opponent
1	Danya Abrams	20	1993–94	Providence
2	Quinten Post	19	2023–24	Harvard
	Ryan Anderson	19	2012–13	New Hampshire
	Ryan Sidney	19	2002–03	St. Bonaventure
5	Mark Raterick	18	1971–72	Dartmouth
6	Ryan Anderson	17	2012–13	Florida Atlantic
	Craig Smith	17	2005–06	Holy Cross
	Danya Abrams	17	1995–96	Indiana
	Steve Benton	17	1987–88	Middle Tennessee
	T.J. Bickerstaff	17	2021–22	Columbia
	T.J. Bickerstaff	17	2021–22	North Carolina

== Assists ==
Career
Rk	Player	Assists	Seasons
1	Billy Evans	669	1966–67 1967–68 1968–69
2	Jim O’Brien	663	1968–69 1969–70 1970–71
3	Tyrese Rice	594	2005–06 2006–07 2007–08 2008–09
4	Howard Eisley	544	1990–91 1991–92 1992–93 1993–94
5	Louis Hinnant	501	2002–03 2003–04 2004–05 2005–06
6	Duane Woodward	488	1994–95 1995–96 1996–97 1997–98
7	Michael Adams	475	1981–82 1982–83 1983–84 1984–85
8	Jim Sweeney	446	1976–77 1977–78 1978–79 1979–80
9	Jere Nolan	444	1971–72 1972–73 1973–74
10	Dana Barros	438	1985–86 1986–87 1987–88 1988–89

Season
Rk	Player	Assists	Season
1	Billy Evans	276	1966–67
2	Jere Nolan	272	1972–73
3	Jere Nolan	247	1973–74
4	Jim O’Brien	231	1970–71
5	Jim O’Brien	221	1969–70
6	Tom O’Toole	213	1951–52
7	Billy Evans	212	1968–69
8	Jim O’Brien	211	1968–69
9	Tyrese Rice	178	2006–07
10	Tyrese Rice	176	2008–09

Single game
Rk	Player	Assists	Season	Opponent
1	Tyrese Rice	13	2006–07	Hartford
	Jere Nolan	13	1971–72	Dartmouth
3	Makai Ashton-Langford	12	2022–23	Virginia Tech
	Tyrese Rice	12	2006–07	Miami
	Duane Woodward	12	1997–98	Rutgers
	Howard Eisley	12	1992–93	Syracuse
7	Reggie Jackson	11	2009–10	Virginia Tech
	Louis Hinnant	11	2005–06	North Carolina
	Duane Woodward	11	1997–98	Marquette
	Dana Barros	11	1987–88	Florida Tech
	Michael Adams	11	1984–85	Connecticut
	Bobby Smith	11	1972–73	Brown

== Steals ==
Career
Rk	Player	Steals	Seasons
1	Michael Adams	275	1981–82 1982–83 1983–84 1984–85
2	Troy Bell	272	1999–00 2000–01 2001–02 2002–03
3	Duane Woodward	204	1994–95 1995–96 1996–97 1997–98
4	Malcolm Huckaby	198	1990–91 1991–92 1992–93 1993–94
5	Howard Eisley	195	1990–91 1991–92 1992–93 1993–94
6	Dominic Pressley	190	1982–83 1983–84 1984–85 1985–86
7	Dana Barros	181	1985–86 1986–87 1987–88 1988–89
8	Jared Dudley	176	2003–04 2004–05 2005–06 2006–07
9	Jaeden Zackery	168	2021–22 2022–23 2023–24
10	Tyrese Rice	161	2005–06 2006–07 2007–08 2008–09

Season
Rk	Player	Steals	Season
1	Michael Adams	88	1983–84
	Michael Adams	88	1982–83
3	Troy Bell	83	2000–01
4	Troy Bell	72	2001–02
5	Jim Sweeney	71	1978–79
6	Troy Bell	70	2002–03
	Michael Adams	70	1984–85
8	Steffon Mitchell	68	2019–20
9	Duane Woodward	65	1997–98
10	Malcolm Huckaby	63	1992–93
	Jaeden Zackery	63	2023–24

Single game
Rk	Player	Steals	Season	Opponent
1	Troy Bell	8	2000–01	Syracuse
	Troy Bell	8	2000–01	Saint Peter's
	Michael Adams	8	1982–83	St. John's
4	Rakim Sanders	7	2008–09	North Carolina
	Scoonie Penn	7	1996–97	Pittsburgh
	Malcolm Huckaby	7	1992–93	Miami

== Blocks ==
Career
Rk	Player	Blocks	Seasons
1	Sean Williams	193	2004–05 2005–06 2006–07
2	Burnett Adams	168	1979–80 1980–81 1981–82 1982–83
3	Tyrelle Blair	167	2006–07 2007–08
4	Uka Agbai	146	1999–00 2000–01 2001–02 2002–03 2003–04
5	Dennis Clifford	126	2011–12 2012–13 2013–14 2014–15 2015–16
6	Mickey Curley	120	1994–95 1995–96 1996–97 1997–98
7	Steffon Mitchell	113	2017–18 2018–19 2019–20 2020–21
8	Quinten Post	109	2021–22 2022–23 2023–24
9	Doug Able	101	1987–88 1988–89 1989–90 1990–91
10	Craig Smith	100	2002–03 2003–04 2004–05 2005–06

Season
Rk	Player	Blocks	Season
1	Tyrelle Blair	105	2007–08
2	Sean Williams	75	2006–07
3	Sean Williams	63	2004–05
4	Tyrelle Blair	62	2006–07
5	John Garris	61	1982–83
	Quinten Post	61	2023–24
7	Sean Williams	55	2005–06
8	Burnett Adams	52	1979–80
9	Burnett Adams	47	1980–81
	Jayden Hastings	47	2025–26

Single game
Rk	Player	Blocks	Season	Opponent
1	Sean Williams	13	2006–07	Duquesne
2	Sean Williams	12	2006–07	Providence
3	Tyrelle Blair	11	2007–08	Maryland
4	Sean Williams	9	2005–06	NC State
5	Tyrelle Blair	8	2007–08	Saint Louis
	Sean Williams	8	2004–05	Providence
7	Tyrelle Blair	7	2007–08	Miami
	Sean Williams	7	2006–07	Kansas
	Sean Williams	7	2006–07	Maryland
	Sean Williams	7	2006–07	Rhode Island
	Burnett Adams	7	1982–83	Fairfield
