= 1983 Big East men's basketball tournament =

- Classification: Division I
- Season: 1982–83
- Teams: 9
- Site: Madison Square Garden; New York City
- Champions: St. John's (1st title)
- Winning coach: Lou Carnesecca (1st title)
- MVP: Chris Mullin (St. John's)
- Television: Katz Sports/USA Network,NBC (Championship Game)

1982–83 Big East men's basketball standings
	Conf.				Overall
Team	W		L	PCT	W		L	PCT
No. 11 Boston College	12	–	4	.750	25	–	7	.781
No. 13 Villanova	12	–	4	.750	24	–	8	.750
No. 3 St. John's†	12	–	4	.750	28	–	5	.848
No. 20 Georgetown	11	–	5	.688	22	–	10	.688
Syracuse	9	–	7	.563	21	–	10	.677
Pittsburgh	6	–	10	.375	13	–	15	.464
Connecticut	5	–	11	.313	12	–	16	.429
Providence	4	–	12	.250	12	–	19	.387
Seton Hall	1	–	15	.063	6	–	23	.207
† 1983 Big East tournament winner Rankings from AP Poll

The 1983 Big East men's basketball tournament took place at Madison Square Garden in New York City. Its winner received the Big East Conference's automatic bid to the 1983 NCAA tournament. It is a single-elimination tournament with three rounds. Boston College had the best regular season conference record and received the #1 seed. It was the first year that the tournament was held at Madison Square Garden, where it has been held since.

Led by Chris Mullin, St. John's defeated Boston College in the championship game 85–77.

== Bracket ==
First round March 9, 1983
8	Providence	64
9	Seton Hall	73

Quarterfinals; March 10, 1983
1	#14 Boston College	79
9	Seton Hall	56
4	#15 Georgetown	72
5	#20 Syracuse	79
2	#13 Villanova	69
7	Connecticut	68
3	#8 St. John's	64
6	Pittsburgh	53

Semifinals; March 11, 1983
1	#14 Boston College	80
5	#20 Syracuse	74
2	#13 Villanova	80
3	#8 St. John's	91

Championship Game; March 12, 1983
1	#14 Boston College	77
3	#8 St. John's	85

== Awards ==
Most Valuable Player: Chris Mullin, St. John's

All Tournament Team

- John Garris, Boston College
- Billy Goodwin, St. John's
- Stewart Granger, Villanova
- Jay Murphy, Boston College
- Leo Rautins, Syracuse
