= 1982–83 Boston College Eagles men's basketball team =

American college basketball season

1982–83 Boston College Eagles men's basketball

Big East Regular Season Co-Champions

NCAA Men's Division I Tournament, Sweet Sixteen
- Conference: Big East Conference

Ranking
- Coaches: No. 13
- AP: No. 11
- Record: 25–7 (12–4 Big East)
- Head coach: Gary Williams (1st season)
- Home arena: Roberts Center

1982–83 Big East men's basketball standings
	Conf.				Overall
Team	W		L	PCT	W		L	PCT
No. 11 Boston College	12	–	4	.750	25	–	7	.781
No. 13 Villanova	12	–	4	.750	24	–	8	.750
No. 3 St. John's†	12	–	4	.750	28	–	5	.848
No. 20 Georgetown	11	–	5	.688	22	–	10	.688
Syracuse	9	–	7	.563	21	–	10	.677
Pittsburgh	6	–	10	.375	13	–	15	.464
Connecticut	5	–	11	.313	12	–	16	.429
Providence	4	–	12	.250	12	–	19	.387
Seton Hall	1	–	15	.063	6	–	23	.207
† 1983 Big East tournament winner Rankings from AP Poll

The 1982–83 Boston College Eagles men's basketball team represented Boston College as members of the Big East Conference during the 1982–83 NCAA Division I men's basketball season.

== Roster ==
1982–83 Boston College Eagles men's basketball team
Players
Coaches

Pos.	#	Name	Height	Weight	Year	Hometown
G	5	Dominic Pressley	6 ft 2 in (1.88 m)	165 lb (75 kg)	Fr	Washington, D.C.
G	23	Michael Adams	5 ft 10 in (1.78 m)	—	So	Hartford, CT
PF	42	Jay Murphy	6 ft 9 in (2.06 m)	210 lb (95 kg)	Jr	Meriden, CT
C		Ron Crevier	7 ft 0 in (2.13 m)	230 lb (104 kg)	Sr	Montreal, Quebec
PF	55	John Garris	6 ft 8 in (2.03 m)	200 lb (91 kg)	Sr	Bridgeport, CT
F		Roger McCready	6 ft 5 in (1.96 m)	—	Fr
G		Terrence Talley	6 ft 4 in (1.93 m)	—	So
G		Stu Primus	6 ft 3 in (1.91 m)	—	So

Head coach

- Gary Williams (Maryland)

Assistant coach(es)

- Kevin Mackey

Legend

- (C) Team captain
- (S) Suspended
- (I) Ineligible
- (W) Walk-on
- Injured
- Current redshirt

Roster

== Schedule and results ==
Date time, TV	Rank^{#}	Opponent^{#}	Result	Record	Site (attendance) city, state
Regular Season
Nov 28, 1982*		Saint Michael's	W 98–56	1–0	Roberts Center; Chestnut Hill, MA
Dec 1, 1982*		Stonehill	W 114–86	2–0	Roberts Center; Chestnut Hill, MA
Dec 3, 1982*		New Hampshire	W 92–60	3–0	Roberts Center; Chestnut Hill, MA
Dec 6, 1982*		at Northeastern	W 92–79	4–0	Matthews Arena; Boston, MA
Dec 8, 1982*		at Brown	W 102–75	5–0	Marvel Gymnasium; Providence, RI
Dec 21, 1982*		Fairfield	W 99–79	7–0	Roberts Center; Chestnut Hill, MA
Dec 29, 1982*		vs. Western Kentucky; Cotton States Classic	L 68–74	7–1	The Omni; Atlanta, GA
Dec 30, 1982*		vs. Columbia; Cotton States Classic	W 57–53	8–1	The Omni; Atlanta, GA
Jan 4, 1983*		vs. No. 14 Villanova	L 72–79	8–2 (0–1)	Brendan Byrne Arena; East Rutherford, NJ
Jan 8, 1983*		Seton Hall	W 90–73	9–2 (1–1)	Roberts Center; Chestnut Hill, MA
Jan 11, 1983*		Rhode Island	W 93–77	10–2	Roberts Center; Chestnut Hill, MA
Jan 15, 1983		at No. 3 St. John's	W 68–64	11–2 (2–1)	Roberts Center; Chestnut Hill, MA
Jan 17, 1983*		No. 15 Syracuse	L 85–102	11–3 (2–2)	Roberts Center; Chestnut Hill, MA
Jan 22, 1983		vs. Connecticut	W 88–79	12–3 (3–2)	New Haven Coliseum; New Haven, Connecticut
Jan 25, 1983*		Pittsburgh	W 68–63	13–3 (4–2)	Roberts Center; Chestnut Hill, MA
Jan 29, 1983		at No. 15 Georgetown	L 67–69	13–4 (4–3)	Capital Centre; Landover, MD
Feb 2, 1983		at Providence	W 73–70	14–4 (5–3)	Providence Civic Center; Providence, RI
Feb 5, 1983		No. 11 Villanova	W 76–70	15–4 (6–3)	Roberts Center; Chestnut Hill, MA
Feb 9, 1983		at Seton Hall	W 91–76	16–4 (7–3)	Brendan Byrne Arena; East Rutherford, NJ
Feb 12, 1983*		at Holy Cross	W 89–74	17–4	Hart Center; Worcester, MA
Feb 15, 1983	No. 18	at No. 6 St. John's	W 92–75	18–4 (8–3)	Madison Square Garden; New York, NY
Feb 19, 1983	No. 18	at No. 17 Syracuse	L 88–108	18–5 (8–4)	Carrier Dome; Syracuse, New York
Feb 21, 1983	No. 19	Connecticut	W 86–80	19–5 (9–4)	Roberts Center; Chestnut Hill, MA
Feb 26, 1983	No. 19	at Pittsburgh	W 70–52	20–5 (10–4)	Fitzgerald Field House; Pittsburgh, Pennsylvania
Mar 2, 1983	No. 15	No. 16 Georgetown	W 87–85	21–5 (11–4)	Boston Garden; Boston, MA
Mar 5, 1983	No. 15	Providence	W 81–66	22–5 (12–4)	Roberts Center; Chestnut Hill, MA
Big East Tournament
Mar 10, 1983*	(1) No. 14	vs. (9) Seton Hall; Quarterfinal	W 79–56	23–5	Madison Square Garden; New York, NY
Mar 11, 1983*	(1) No. 14	vs. (5) No. 20 Syracuse; Semifinal	W 80–74	24–5	Madison Square Garden; New York, NY
Mar 12, 1983*	(1) No. 14	at (3) No. 8 St. John's; Championship Game	L 77–85	24–6	Madison Square Garden; New York, NY
NCAA Tournament
Mar 20, 1983*	(4 W) No. 11	vs. (12 W) Princeton; Second Round	W 51–42	25–6	Gill Coliseum; Corvallis, OR
Mar 24, 1983*	(4 W) No. 11	vs. (1 W) No. 1 Virginia; Sweet Sixteen	L 92–95	25–7	Dee Glen Smith Spectrum (12,084); Logan, UT
*Non-conference game. ^{#}Rankings from AP Poll. (#) Tournament seedings in parentheses.
