= List of All-Big East Conference men's basketball teams =

The All-Big East men's basketball team is an annual Big East Conference honor bestowed on the best players in the conference following every college basketball season.

Players are listed by number of votes, with the player who received the most votes listed first.

== Selections ==
=== 1980–1989 ===
Season	First team		Second team		Third team	
Season	Players	Teams	Players	Teams	Players	Teams
1979–80	John Duren	Georgetown	Dan Callandrillo	Seton Hall	Eddie Moss	Syracuse
1979–80	Craig Shelton	Georgetown	Sleepy Floyd	Georgetown	Marty Headd	Syracuse
1979–80	Reggie Carter	St. John's	Wayne McKoy	St. John's	Joe Beaulieu	Boston College
1979–80	Roosevelt Bouie	Syracuse	Corny Thompson	UConn	Mike McKay	UConn
1979–80	Louis Orr	Syracuse	David Russell	St. John's	Rudy Williams	Providence
1980–81	John Bagley	Boston College	Marty Headd	Syracuse	Stewart Granger	Villanova
1980–81	Corny Thompson	UConn	Dan Callandrillo	Seton Hall	Dwan Chandler	Boston College
1980–81	Sleepy Floyd	Georgetown	Chuck Aleksinas	UConn	Wayne McKoy	St. John's
1980–81	Danny Schayes	Syracuse	Eric Smith	Georgetown	Howard McNeil	Seton Hall
1980–81	John Pinone	Villanova	David Russell	St. John's	Mike McKay	UConn
1980–81					Fran Gilroy	St. John's
1981–82	John Bagley	Boston College	Erich Santifer	Syracuse	Ron Jackson	Providence
1981–82	Corny Thompson	UConn	Chris Mullin	St. John's	Eric Smith	Georgetown
1981–82	Sleepy Floyd	Georgetown	Stewart Granger	Villanova	Otis Thorpe	Providence
1981–82	David Russell	St. John's	Patrick Ewing	Georgetown	Tony Bruin	Syracuse
1981–82	Dan Callandrillo	Seton Hall	Mike McKay	UConn	Billy Goodwin	St. John's
1981–82	John Pinone	Villanova				
1982–83	Patrick Ewing	Georgetown	Michael Adams	Boston College	Ron Jackson	Providence
1982–83	Erich Santifer	Syracuse	Stewart Granger	Villanova	Leo Rautins	Syracuse
1982–83	Chris Mullin	St. John's	John Garris	Boston College	Otis Thorpe	Providence
1982–83	Ed Pinckney	Villanova	Jay Murphy	Boston College	Billy Goodwin	St. John's
1982–83	John Pinone	Villanova	David Russell	St. John's	Clyde Vaughan	Pittsburgh
1983–84	Jay Murphy	Boston College	Michael Adams	Boston College	Michael Jackson	Georgetown
1983–84	Patrick Ewing	Georgetown	David Wingate	Georgetown	Karl Hobbs	UConn
1983–84	Otis Thorpe	Providence	Ed Pinckney	Villanova	Bill Wennington	St. John's
1983–84	Chris Mullin	St. John's	Rafael Addison	Syracuse	Dwayne McClain	Villanova
1983–84	Pearl Washington	Syracuse	Clyde Vaughan	Pittsburgh	Harold Pressley	Villanova
1983–84					Andre McCloud	Seton Hall
1984–85	Patrick Ewing	Georgetown	Earl Kelley	UConn	Michael Jackson	Georgetown
1984–85	Chris Mullin	St. John's	Michael Adams	Boston College	Mike Moses	St. John's
1984–85	Rafael Addison	Syracuse	Bill Wennington	St. John's	Dwayne McClain	Villanova
1984–85	Pearl Washington	Syracuse	Walter Berry	St. John's	Andre McCloud	Seton Hall
1984–85	Ed Pinckney	Villanova	Bill Martin	Georgetown	David Wingate	Georgetown
1984–85					Charles Smith	Pittsburgh
1985–86	Reggie Williams	Georgetown	Earl Kelley	UConn	Roger McCready	Boston College
1985–86	Mark Jackson	St. John's	David Wingate	Georgetown	Michael Jackson	Georgetown
1985–86	Walter Berry	St. John's	Rafael Addison	Syracuse	Demetreus Gore	Pittsburgh
1985–86	Pearl Washington	Syracuse	Rony Seikaly	Syracuse	Charles Smith	Pittsburgh
1985–86	Harold Pressley	Villanova	Wendell Alexis	Syracuse	Billy Donovan	Providence
1986–87	Reggie Williams	Georgetown	Dana Barros	Boston College	Derrick Coleman	Syracuse
1986–87	Charles Smith	Pittsburgh	Perry McDonald	Georgetown	Greg Monroe	Syracuse
1986–87	Jerome Lane	Pittsburgh	Mark Bryant	Seton Hall	Dave Kipfer	Providence
1986–87	Billy Donovan	Providence	Rony Seikaly	Syracuse	James Major	Seton Hall
1986–87	Mark Jackson	St. John's	Harold Jensen	Villanova	Willie Glass	St. John's
1986–87	Sherman Douglas	Syracuse				
1987–88	Mark Bryant	Seton Hall	Jerome Lane	Pittsburgh	Clifford Robinson	UConn
1987–88	Charles Smith	Pittsburgh	Shelton Jones	St. John's	Mark Plansky	Villanova
1987–88	Dana Barros	Boston College	Rony Seikaly	Syracuse	Tom Greis	Villanova
1987–88	Sherman Douglas	Syracuse	Charles Smith	Georgetown	Steve Wright	Providence
1987–88	Derrick Coleman	Syracuse	Doug West	Villanova	Michael Porter	St. John's
1988–89	Sherman Douglas	Syracuse	Dana Barros	Boston College	Eric Murdock	Providence
1988–89	Charles Smith	Georgetown	Stephen Thompson	Syracuse	Jason Matthews	Pittsburgh
1988–89	Ramón Ramos	Seton Hall	Jayson Williams	St. John's	John Morton	Seton Hall
1988–89	Brian Shorter	Pittsburgh	Alonzo Mourning	Georgetown	Andrew Gaze	Seton Hall
1988–89	Derrick Coleman	Syracuse	Clifford Robinson	UConn	Doug West	Villanova

=== 1990–1999 ===
Season	First team		Second team		Third team	
Season	Players	Teams	Players	Teams	Players	Teams
1989–90	Mark Tillmon	Georgetown	Chris Smith	UConn	Tate George	UConn
1989–90	Alonzo Mourning	Georgetown	Dikembe Mutombo	Georgetown	Nadav Henefeld	UConn
1989–90	Brian Shorter	Pittsburgh	Carlton Screen	Providence	Dwayne Bryant	Georgetown
1989–90	Boo Harvey	St. John's	Malik Sealy	St. John's	Jason Matthews	Pittsburgh
1989–90	Derrick Coleman	Syracuse	Stephen Thompson	Syracuse	Marty Conlon	Providence
1989–90	Billy Owens	Syracuse				
1990–91	Billy Owens	Syracuse	Dave Johnson	Syracuse	Scott Burrell	UConn
1990–91	Malik Sealy	St. John's	Brian Shorter	Pittsburgh	Alonzo Mourning	Georgetown
1990–91	Dikembe Mutombo	Georgetown	Anthony Avent	Seton Hall	Robert Werdann	St. John's
1990–91	Terry Dehere	Seton Hall	Chris Smith	UConn	Jason Matthews	Pittsburgh
1990–91	Eric Murdock	Providence	Jason Buchanan	St. John's	Lance Miller	Villanova
1991–92	Alonzo Mourning	Georgetown	Bill Curley	Boston College	Rod Sellers	UConn
1991–92	Malik Sealy	St. John's	Scott Burrell	UConn	Darren Morningstar	Pittsburgh
1991–92	Dave Johnson	Syracuse	Jerry Walker	Seton Hall	Michael Smith	Providence
1991–92	Chris Smith	UConn	Sean Miller	Pittsburgh	Marques Bragg	Providence
1991–92	Terry Dehere	Seton Hall	Lance Miller	Villanova	Joey Brown	Georgetown
1991–92					Lawrence Moten	Syracuse
1992–93	Bill Curley	Boston College	Artūras Karnišovas	Seton Hall	Constantin Popa	Miami (FL)
1992–93	Donyell Marshall	UConn	Shawnelle Scott	St. John's	Lamont Middleton	St. John's
1992–93	Lawrence Moten	Syracuse	Michael Smith	Providence	Jerry Walker	Seton Hall
1992–93	David Cain	St. John's	Howard Eisley	Boston College	Adrian Autry	Syracuse
1992–93	Terry Dehere	Seton Hall	Jerry McCullough	Pittsburgh	Scott Burrell	UConn
1993–94	Donyell Marshall	UConn	Michael Smith	Providence	Eric Mobley	Pittsburgh
1993–94	Bill Curley	Boston College	Othella Harrington	Georgetown	Shawnelle Scott	St. John's
1993–94	Kerry Kittles	Villanova	Artūras Karnišovas	Seton Hall	Donny Marshall	UConn
1993–94	Lawrence Moten	Syracuse	John Wallace	Syracuse	Jerry McCullough	Pittsburgh
1993–94	Adrian Autry	Syracuse	Howard Eisley	Boston College	Doron Sheffer	UConn
1994–95	Danya Abrams	Boston College	Jaime Peterson	Pittsburgh	Adrian Griffin	Seton Hall
1994–95	Eric Williams	Providence	Eric Eberz	Villanova	Donny Marshall	UConn
1994–95	John Wallace	Syracuse	Jason Lawson	Villanova	Jerome Williams	Georgetown
1994–95	Ray Allen	UConn	Doron Sheffer	UConn	Constantin Popa	Miami (FL)
1994–95	Lawrence Moten	Syracuse	Allen Iverson	Georgetown	Felipe López	St. John's
1994–95	Kerry Kittles	Villanova			Kevin Ollie	UConn
1995–96	Danya Abrams	Boston College	Zendon Hamilton	St. John's	Austin Croshere	Providence
1995–96	Kerry Kittles	Villanova	Jason Lawson	Villanova	Pat Garrity	Notre Dame
1995–96	John Wallace	Syracuse	Adrian Griffin	Seton Hall	Damian Owens	West Virginia
1995–96	Ray Allen	UConn	Damon Santiago	Rutgers	Othella Harrington	Georgetown
1995–96	Allen Iverson	Georgetown	Doron Sheffer	UConn	Jerome Williams	Georgetown
1996–97	Danya Abrams	Boston College	Tim James	Miami (FL)	Derrick Brown	Providence
1996–97	Victor Page	Georgetown	Vonteego Cummings	Pittsburgh	Felipe López	St. John's
1996–97	Pat Garrity	Notre Dame	Zendon Hamilton	St. John's	Jason Cipolla	Syracuse
1996–97	Austin Croshere	Providence	Shaheen Holloway	Seton Hall	Tim Thomas	Villanova
1996–97	Alvin Williams	Villanova	Otis Hill	Syracuse	Damian Owens	West Virginia
1996–97			Jason Lawson	Villanova		
1997–98	Richard Hamilton	UConn	Vonteego Cummings	Pittsburgh	Antonio Granger	Boston College
1997–98	Tim James	Miami (FL)	Jamel Thomas	Providence	Duane Woodward	Boston College
1997–98	Pat Garrity	Notre Dame	Zendon Hamilton	St. John's	Khalid El-Amin	UConn
1997–98	Felipe López	St. John's	Levell Sanders	Seton Hall	Shaheen Holloway	Seton Hall
1997–98	Damian Owens	West Virginia	Todd Burgan	Syracuse	Etan Thomas	Syracuse
1998–99	Richard Hamilton	UConn	Khalid El-Amin	UConn	Vonteego Cummings	Pittsburgh
1998–99	Tim James	Miami (FL)	Troy Murphy	Notre Dame	Isaac Hawkins	Pittsburgh
1998–99	Johnny Hemsley	Miami (FL)	Bootsy Thornton	St. John's	Rob Hodgson	Rutgers
1998–99	Jamel Thomas	Providence	Etan Thomas	Syracuse	Jason Hart	Syracuse
1998–99	Ron Artest	St. John's	Marcus Goree	West Virginia	John Celestand	Villanova

=== 2000–2009 ===
Season	First team		Second team		Third team	
Season	Players	Teams	Players	Teams	Players	Teams
1999–00	Khalid El-Amin	UConn	Johnny Hemsley	Miami (FL)	Ruben Boumtje-Boumtje	Georgetown
1999–00	Troy Murphy	Notre Dame	Ricardo Greer	Pittsburgh	Mario Bland	Miami (FL)
1999–00	Erick Barkley	St. John's	Lavor Postell	St. John's	Bootsy Thornton	St. John's
1999–00	Jason Hart	Syracuse	Shaheen Holloway	Seton Hall	Ryan Blackwell	Syracuse
1999–00	Etan Thomas	Syracuse	Malik Allen	Villanova	Marcus Goree	West Virginia
2000–01	Troy Bell	Boston College	Kevin Braswell	Georgetown	Caron Butler	UConn
2000–01	Troy Murphy	Notre Dame	Ricardo Greer	Pittsburgh	John Salmons	Miami (FL)
2000–01	Preston Shumpert	Syracuse	John Linehan	Providence	Ryan Humphrey	Notre Dame
2000–01	Michael Bradley	Villanova	Eddie Griffin	Seton Hall	Todd Billet	Rutgers
2000–01	Calvin Bowman	West Virginia	Damone Brown	Syracuse	Omar Cook	St. John's
2001–02	Troy Bell	Boston College	Darius Rice	Miami (FL)	Emeka Okafor	UConn
2001–02	Caron Butler	UConn	John Salmons	Miami (FL)	Kevin Braswell	Georgetown
2001–02	Mike Sweetney	Georgetown	John Linehan	Providence	James Jones	Miami (FL)
2001–02	Ryan Humphrey	Notre Dame	Rashod Kent	Rutgers	Chris Thomas	Notre Dame
2001–02	Brandin Knight	Pittsburgh	Ricky Wright	Villanova	DeShaun Williams	Syracuse
2001–02	Marcus Hatten	St. John's			Chris Moss	West Virginia
2001–02	Preston Shumpert	Syracuse				
2002–03	Troy Bell	Boston College	Craig Smith	Boston College	Darius Rice	Miami (FL)
2002–03	Emeka Okafor	UConn	Ben Gordon	UConn	Julius Page	Pittsburgh
2002–03	Mike Sweetney	Georgetown	Chris Thomas	Notre Dame	Chevon Troutman	Pittsburgh
2002–03	Matt Carroll	Notre Dame	Brandin Knight	Pittsburgh	Hakim Warrick	Syracuse
2002–03	Marcus Hatten	St. John's	Ryan Gomes	Providence	Drew Schifino	West Virginia
2002–03	Carmelo Anthony	Syracuse	Andre Barrett	Seton Hall		
2003–04	Craig Smith	Boston College	Darius Rice	Miami (FL)	Gerald Riley	Georgetown
2003–04	Ben Gordon	UConn	Chris Thomas	Notre Dame	Chris Taft	Pittsburgh
2003–04	Emeka Okafor	UConn	Jaron Brown	Pittsburgh	Hervé Lamizana	Rutgers
2003–04	Ryan Gomes	Providence	Carl Krauser	Pittsburgh	Allan Ray	Villanova
2003–04	Andre Barrett	Seton Hall	Gerry McNamara	Syracuse	Curtis Sumpter	Villanova
2003–04	Hakim Warrick	Syracuse				
2003–04	Bryant Matthews	Virginia Tech				
2004–05	Jared Dudley	Boston College	Josh Boone	UConn	Marcus Williams	UConn
2004–05	Craig Smith	Boston College	Charlie Villanueva	UConn	Brandon Bowman	Georgetown
2004–05	Chevon Troutman	Pittsburgh	Carl Krauser	Pittsburgh	Chris Thomas	Notre Dame
2004–05	Ryan Gomes	Providence	Allan Ray	Villanova	Daryll Hill	St. John's
2004–05	Gerry McNamara	Syracuse	Curtis Sumpter	Villanova	Randy Foye	Villanova
2004–05	Hakim Warrick	Syracuse				

Season	First team		Second team	
Season	Players	Teams	Players	Teams
2005–06	Eric Hicks	Cincinnati	Hilton Armstrong	UConn
2005–06	Rudy Gay	UConn	Marcus Williams	UConn
2005–06	Steve Novak	Marquette	Jeff Green	Georgetown
2005–06	Chris Quinn	Notre Dame	Roy Hibbert	Georgetown
2005–06	Aaron Gray	Pittsburgh	Taquan Dean	Louisville
2005–06	Quincy Douby	Rutgers	Carl Krauser	Pittsburgh
2005–06	Gerry McNamara	Syracuse	Donnie McGrath	Providence
2005–06	Randy Foye	Villanova	Donald Copeland	Seton Hall
2005–06	Allan Ray	Villanova	Kelly Whitney	Seton Hall
2005–06	Mike Gansey	West Virginia	Kyle Lowry	Villanova
2005–06	Kevin Pittsnogle	West Virginia		
2006–07	Jeff Green	Georgetown	Jeff Adrien	UConn
2006–07	Roy Hibbert	Georgetown	Wilson Chandler	DePaul
2006–07	Dominic James	Marquette	Sammy Mejia	DePaul
2006–07	Russell Carter	Notre Dame	David Padgett	Louisville
2006–07	Colin Falls	Notre Dame	Terrence Williams	Louisville
2006–07	Aaron Gray	Pittsburgh	Jerel McNeal	Marquette
2006–07	Herbert Hill	Providence	Levance Fields	Pittsburgh
2006–07	Lamont Hamilton	St. John's	Brian Laing	Seton Hall
2006–07	Demetris Nichols	Syracuse	Kentrell Gransberry	South Florida
2006–07	Curtis Sumpter	Villanova	Scottie Reynolds	Villanova
2006–07	Frank Young	West Virginia		
2007–08	Deonta Vaughn	Cincinnati	Hasheem Thabeet	UConn
2007–08	Jeff Adrien	UConn	Jonathan Wallace	Georgetown
2007–08	A. J. Price	UConn	Draelon Burns	DePaul
2007–08	Roy Hibbert	Georgetown	Terrence Williams	Louisville
2007–08	David Padgett	Louisville	Lazar Hayward	Marquette
2007–08	Luke Harangody	Notre Dame	Dominic James	Marquette
2007–08	Kyle McAlarney	Notre Dame	Jerel McNeal	Marquette
2007–08	Sam Young	Pittsburgh	Donte Greene	Syracuse
2007–08	Brian Laing	Seton Hall	Paul Harris	Syracuse
2007–08	Kentrell Gransberry	South Florida	Scottie Reynolds	Villanova
2007–08	Joe Alexander	West Virginia		

Season	First team		Second team		Third team	
Season	Players	Teams	Players	Teams	Players	Teams
2008–09	Hasheem Thabeet	UConn	A. J. Price	UConn	Deonta Vaughn	Cincinnati
2008–09	Terrence Williams	Louisville	Wesley Matthews	Marquette	Jeff Adrien	UConn
2008–09	Jerel McNeal	Marquette	Jonny Flynn	Syracuse	Earl Clark	Louisville
2008–09	Luke Harangody	Notre Dame	Dante Cunningham	Villanova	Levance Fields	Pittsburgh
2008–09	DeJuan Blair	Pittsburgh	Da'Sean Butler	West Virginia	Jeremy Hazell	Seton Hall
2008–09	Sam Young	Pittsburgh				

=== 2010–2019 ===
Season	First team		Second team		Third team	
Season	Players	Teams	Players	Teams	Players	Teams
2009–10	Greg Monroe	Georgetown	Austin Freeman	Georgetown	Jerome Dyson	UConn
2009–10	Luke Harangody	Notre Dame	Lazar Hayward	Marquette	Kemba Walker	UConn
2009–10	Dominique Jones	South Florida	Ashton Gibbs	Pittsburgh	Samardo Samuels	Louisville
2009–10	Wesley Johnson	Syracuse	Jeremy Hazell	Seton Hall	Corey Fisher	Villanova
2009–10	Scottie Reynolds	Villanova	Andy Rautins	Syracuse	Devin Ebanks	West Virginia
2009–10	Da'Sean Butler	West Virginia				
2010–11	Kemba Walker	UConn	Preston Knowles	Louisville	Chris Wright	Georgetown
2010–11	Austin Freeman	Georgetown	Darius Johnson-Odom	Marquette	Tim Abromaitis	Notre Dame
2010–11	Ben Hansbrough	Notre Dame	Brad Wanamaker	Pittsburgh	Jeremy Hazell	Seton Hall
2010–11	Ashton Gibbs	Pittsburgh	Rick Jackson	Syracuse	Kris Joseph	Syracuse
2010–11	MarShon Brooks	Providence	Corey Fisher	Villanova	Corey Stokes	Villanova
2010–11	Dwight Hardy	St. John's				
2011–12	Jeremy Lamb	UConn	Sean Kilpatrick	Cincinnati	Henry Sims	Georgetown
2011–12	Jason Clark	Georgetown	Jack Cooley	Notre Dame	Vincent Council	Providence
2011–12	Jae Crowder	Marquette	Jordan Theodore	Seton Hall	Herb Pope	Seton Hall
2011–12	Darius Johnson-Odom	Marquette	Scoop Jardine	Syracuse	Dion Waiters	Syracuse
2011–12	Kris Joseph	Syracuse	Maalik Wayns	Villanova	Darryl Bryant	West Virginia
2011–12	Kevin Jones	West Virginia				
2012–13	Shabazz Napier	UConn	Sean Kilpatrick	Cincinnati	Markel Starks	Georgetown
2012–13	Otto Porter	Georgetown	Vander Blue	Marquette	Peyton Siva	Louisville
2012–13	Gorgui Dieng	Louisville	Michael Carter-Williams	Syracuse	Travon Woodall	Pittsburgh
2012–13	Russ Smith	Louisville	Jerian Grant	Notre Dame	Brandon Triche	Syracuse
2012–13	Jack Cooley	Notre Dame	C. J. Fair	Syracuse	JayVaughn Pinkston	Villanova
2012–13	Bryce Cotton	Providence				

Season	First team		Second team	
Season	Players	Teams	Players	Teams
2013–14	Doug McDermott	Creighton	Kellen Dunham	Butler
2013–14	Markel Starks	Georgetown	D'Vauntes Smith-Rivera	Georgetown
2013–14	Bryce Cotton	Providence	Davante Gardner	Marquette
2013–14	D'Angelo Harrison	St. John's	Kadeem Batts	Providence
2013–14	James Bell	Villanova	Fuquan Edwin	Seton Hall
2013–14	Semaj Christon	Xavier	JayVaughn Pinkston	Villanova
2014–15	Kellen Dunham	Butler	Roosevelt Jones	Butler
2014–15	D'Vauntes Smith-Rivera	Georgetown	Matt Carlino	Marquette
2014–15	Kris Dunn	Providence	Sterling Gibbs	Seton Hall
2014–15	LaDontae Henton	Providence	Sir'Dominic Pointer	St. John's
2014–15	D'Angelo Harrison	St. John's	Matt Stainbrook	Xavier
2014–15	Ryan Arcidiacono	Villanova		
2014–15	Darrun Hilliard	Villanova		
2015–16	Henry Ellenson	Marquette	Roosevelt Jones	Butler
2015–16	Ben Bentil	Providence	Kelan Martin	Butler
2015–16	Kris Dunn	Providence	Maurice Watson Jr.	Creighton
2015–16	Isaiah Whitehead	Seton Hall	D'Vauntes Smith-Rivera	Georgetown
2015–16	Josh Hart	Villanova	Ryan Arcidiacono	Villanova
2015–16	Trevon Bluiett	Xavier		
2016–17	Andrew Chrabascz	Butler	Kelan Martin	Butler
2016–17	Marcus Foster	Creighton	Justin Patton	Creighton
2016–17	Ángel Delgado	Seton Hall	Rodney Bullock	Providence
2016–17	Jalen Brunson	Villanova	Kyron Cartwright	Providence
2016–17	Josh Hart	Villanova	Khadeen Carrington	Seton Hall
2016–17	Trevon Bluiett	Xavier		
2017–18	Kelan Martin	Butler	Khyri Thomas	Creighton
2017–18	Marcus Foster	Creighton	Marcus Derrickson	Georgetown
2017–18	Shamorie Ponds	St. John's	Markus Howard	Marquette
2017–18	Mikal Bridges	Villanova	Ángel Delgado	Seton Hall
2017–18	Jalen Brunson	Villanova	Desi Rodriguez	Seton Hall
2017–18	Trevon Bluiett	Xavier		
2018–19	Jessie Govan	Georgetown	Kamar Baldwin	Butler
2018–19	Markus Howard	Marquette	Max Strus	DePaul
2018–19	Shamorie Ponds	St. John's	Sam Hauser	Marquette
2018–19	Myles Powell	Seton Hall	Alpha Diallo	Providence
2018–19	Phil Booth	Villanova	Naji Marshall	Xavier
2018–19	Eric Paschall	Villanova		

=== 2020–present ===
Season	First team		Second team	
Season	Players	Teams	Players	Teams
2019–20	Kamar Baldwin	Butler	Marcus Zegarowski	Creighton
2019–20	Ty-Shon Alexander	Creighton	Paul Reed	DePaul
2019–20	Markus Howard	Marquette	Alpha Diallo	Providence
2019–20	Myles Powell	Seton Hall	Collin Gillespie	Villanova
2019–20	Saddiq Bey	Villanova	Tyrique Jones	Xavier
2019–20	Naji Marshall	Xavier		
2020–21	James Bouknight	UConn	Damien Jefferson	Creighton
2020–21	Marcus Zegarowski	Creighton	David Duke	Providence
2020–21	Sandro Mamukelashvili	Seton Hall	Nate Watson	Providence
2020–21	Collin Gillespie	Villanova	Zach Freemantle	Xavier
2020–21	Jeremiah Robinson-Earl	Villanova	Paul Scruggs	Xavier
2020–21	Julian Champagnie	St. John's		
2021–22	R. J. Cole	UConn	Ryan Hawkins	Creighton
2021–22	Adama Sanogo	UConn	Jared Bynum	Providence
2021–22	Justin Lewis	Marquette	Nate Watson	Providence
2021–22	Collin Gillespie	Villanova	Javon Freeman-Liberty	DePaul
2021–22	Jared Rhoden	Seton Hall	Justin Moore	Villanova
2021–22	Julian Champagnie	St. John's		
2022–23	Jordan Hawkins	UConn	Oso Ighodaro	Marquette
2022–23	Adama Sanogo	UConn	Kam Jones	Marquette
2022–23	Ryan Kalkbrenner	Creighton	Joel Soriano	St. John's
2022–23	Tyler Kolek	Marquette	Eric Dixon	Villanova
2022–23	Bryce Hopkins	Providence	Colby Jones	Xavier
2022–23	Souley Boum	Xavier		
2023–24	Tristen Newton	UConn	Trey Alexander	Creighton
2023–24	Cam Spencer	UConn	Ryan Kalkbrenner	Creighton
2023–24	Baylor Scheierman	Creighton	Oso Ighodaro	Marquette
2023–24	Tyler Kolek	Marquette	Daniss Jenkins	St. John's
2023–24	Devin Carter	Providence	Eric Dixon	Villanova
2023–24	Kadary Richmond	Seton Hall		

Season	First team		Second team		Third team	
Season	Players	Teams	Players	Teams	Players	Teams
2024–25	Ryan Kalkbrenner*	Creighton	Solo Ball	UConn	Jahmyl Telfort	Butler
2024–25	Micah Peavy	Georgetown	Alex Karaban	UConn	Liam McNeeley	UConn
2024–25	Kam Jones*	Marquette	Steven Ashworth	Creighton	Thomas Sorber	Georgetown
2024–25	Zuby Ejiofor	St. John's	Kadary Richmond	St. John's	David Joplin	Marquette
2024–25	RJ Luis Jr.*	St. John's	Zach Freemantle	Xavier	Wooga Poplar	Villanova
2024–25	Eric Dixon*	Villanova			Ryan Conwell	Xavier
2025–26	Michael Ajayi	Butler	Solo Ball	UConn	Finley Bizjack	Butler
2025–26	Alex Karaban	UConn	Jaylin Sellers	Providence	KJ Lewis	Georgetown
2025–26	Silas Demary Jr.	UConn	Bryce Hopkins	St. John's	Nigel James Jr.	Marquette
2025–26	Tarris Reed	UConn	Budd Clark	Seton Hall	Dillon Mitchell	St. John's
2025–26	Zuby Ejiofor*	St. John's	Acaden Lewis	Villanova	Duke Brennan	Villanova
2025–26	Tre Carroll	Xavier			Tyler Perkins	Villanova
* Unanimous Selection

== See also ==
- Big East Conference (1979–2013)
