= 1982–83 Syracuse Orangemen basketball team =

American college basketball season

1982–83 Syracuse Orangemen basketball

NCAA tournament, Second Round, L 74–79 vs. Ohio State
- Conference: Big East Conference
- Record: 21–10 (9–7 Big East)
- Head coach: Jim Boeheim (7th season)
- Assistant coach: Bernie Fine (7th season)
- Home arena: Carrier Dome

1982–83 Big East men's basketball standings
	Conf.				Overall
Team	W		L	PCT	W		L	PCT
No. 11 Boston College	12	–	4	.750	25	–	7	.781
No. 13 Villanova	12	–	4	.750	24	–	8	.750
No. 3 St. John's†	12	–	4	.750	28	–	5	.848
No. 20 Georgetown	11	–	5	.688	22	–	10	.688
Syracuse	9	–	7	.563	21	–	10	.677
Pittsburgh	6	–	10	.375	13	–	15	.464
Connecticut	5	–	11	.313	12	–	16	.429
Providence	4	–	12	.250	12	–	19	.387
Seton Hall	1	–	15	.063	6	–	23	.207
† 1983 Big East tournament winner Rankings from AP Poll

The 1982–83 Syracuse Orangemen basketball team represented Syracuse University during the 1982–83 college basketball season. The team was led by seventh-year head coach Jim Boeheim and played their home games at the Carrier Dome in Syracuse, New York.

The Orange handed the vaunted "Phi Slama Jama" team from Houston its first loss of the season (and one of only three losses total) in front of 19,430 at the Carrier Dome on December 11, 1982.

== Roster ==
1982–83 Syracuse Orange men's basketball team
Players
Coaches

Pos.	#	Name	Height	Weight	Year	Hometown
SF	12	Rafael Addison	6 ft 7 in (2.01 m)	210 lb (95 kg)	Fr	Jersey City, New Jersey
PF	45	Wendell Alexis	6 ft 8 in (2.03 m)	210 lb (95 kg)	Fr	Queens, New York
F		Leo Rautins	6 ft 8 in (2.03 m)	—	Sr	Ithaca, New York

Head coach

- Jim Boeheim (Syracuse)

Assistant coach(es)

- Bernie Fine (Syracuse)

Legend

- (C) Team captain
- (S) Suspended
- (I) Ineligible
- (W) Walk-on
- Injured
- Current redshirt

Roster

== Schedule ==
Date time, TV	Rank^{#}	Opponent^{#}	Result	Record	Site city, state
Regular Season
Nov 27, 1982*		Fordham	W 66–44	1–0	Carrier Dome; Syracuse, New York
Nov 29, 1982*		Cornell	W 110–69	2–0	Carrier Dome; Syracuse, New York
Dec 1, 1982*		at St. Bonaventure	W 73–65	3–0	Reilly Center; St. Bonaventure, New York
Dec 3, 1982*		Alcorn State	W 110–77	4–0	Carrier Dome; Syracuse, New York
Dec 4, 1982*		Princeton	W 67–54	5–0	Carrier Dome; Syracuse, New York
Dec 11, 1982*		No. 9 Houston	W 92–87	6–0	Carrier Dome (19,430); Syracuse, New York
Dec 14, 1982*	No. 16	Ohio State	W 91–85	7–0	Carrier Dome; Syracuse, New York
Dec 18, 1982*	No. 16	at Niagara	W 105–82	8–0	Buffalo Memorial Auditorium; Lewiston, New York
Dec 27, 1982	No. 13	Pittsburgh	W 87–66	9–0 (1–0)	Carrier Dome; Syracuse, New York
Dec 29, 1982*	No. 13	Canisius	W 109–76	10–0	Carrier Dome; Syracuse, New York
Big East tournament
Mar 10, 1983*		vs. No. 15 Georgetown; Quarterfinal/Rivalry	W 79–72	20–8	Madison Square Garden; New York, New York
Mar 11, 1983*		vs. No. 14 Boston College; Semifinals	L 74–80	20–9	Madison Square Garden; New York, New York
NCAA Tournament
Mar 18, 1983*	(6 E)	vs. (11 E) Morehead State; First round	W 74–59	21–9	Hartford Civic Center; Hartford, Connecticut
Mar 20, 1983*	(6 E)	vs. (3 E) Ohio State; Second round	L 74–79	21–10	Hartford Civic Center; Hartford, Connecticut
*Non-conference game. ^{#}Rankings from AP poll. (#) Tournament seedings in parentheses. E=East.
