= Troy Bell =

American basketball player (born 1980)

Personal information
- Born: November 10, 1980 (age 46) Minneapolis, Minnesota, U.S.
- Listed height: 6 ft 1 in (1.85 m)
- Listed weight: 180 lb (82 kg)

Career information
- High school: Academy of Holy Angels (Richfield, Minnesota)
- College: Boston College (1999–2003)
- NBA draft: 2003: 1st round, 16th overall pick
- Drafted by: Boston Celtics
- Playing career: 2003–2016
- Position: Point guard
- Number: 3

Career history
- 2003–2004: Memphis Grizzlies
- 2004: Real Madrid
- 2005–2006: Skyliners Frankfurt
- 2006: Albuquerque Thunderbirds
- 2006–2007: Austin Toros
- 2007–2008: Biella
- 2008: Junior Casale
- 2008–2010: Vanoli Soresina/Cremona
- 2010–2011: Orléans
- 2011: Reggiana
- 2012: Sant'Antimo
- 2012–2013: Barcellona
- 2013–2014: Reggiana
- 2015: Akhisar Belediyespor
- 2015–2016: San Lorenzo

Career highlights
- 2× Consensus second-team All-American (2001, 2003); 2× Big East Player of the Year (2001, 2003); 3× First-team All-Big East (2001–2003)
- Stats at NBA.com
- Stats at Basketball Reference
Medals
Men's basketball
Representing United States
FIBA U21 World Championship
Gold medal – first place	2001 Saitama	Team competition

Troy Delvon Bell (born November 10, 1980) is an American former professional basketball player in the National Basketball Association (NBA) and other leagues mostly in Europe. He is also a R&B producer. He was an All-American college player at Boston College and finished as one of the greatest players in the program's history.

== Early life ==
Bell played high school basketball at the Academy of Holy Angels in Richfield, Minnesota. He was a 4-year letter winner, and Mr. Basketball finalist in Minnesota. In his senior season, he averaged 35.9 points, 6.0 rebounds and 4.0 assists and led the state of Minnesota in scoring. He captured the Missota Conference Player of the Year honors as a senior. In his senior season, his season high in scoring was 47 points, his season low in scoring was 24 points. He scored 45 points in a win over Minnehaha Academy (Dec. 1998). Bell served as team captain as a junior and senior. He finished his school career at Holy Angels as the career scoring leader with 2,491 points (in 97 games). In the state of Minnesota, he ranks fourth on the state's career scoring list.

== College career ==
Bell was an All-American at Boston College, winning a conference player of the year award, and sharing another with Troy Murphy. He ended his career breaking the record for most points scored in Boston College history with 2,632, breaking the record previously set by Dana Barros. He was named Big East Conference player of the year after both his sophomore (shared) and senior seasons, joining Troy Murphy, Richard Hamilton, Patrick Ewing, and Chris Mullin as the only players to win the award multiple times.

On January 25, 2020, Bell's number 2 was retired by Boston College.

== Professional career ==
=== NBA ===
Bell was drafted 16th overall by the Boston Celtics in the first round of the 2003 NBA draft, but was traded on draft night to the Memphis Grizzlies along with Dahntay Jones for Marcus Banks and Kendrick Perkins. He played in 6 games for the Grizzlies in 2003/04 season. On October 1, 2005, the New Orleans/Oklahoma City Hornets signed Bell as a free agent, but October 18 they announced that they had waived him. He had played a total of 10 minutes in the Hornets' first two preseason games.

Those 6 games with the Grizzlies ended up being Bell's only playing time in the NBA, as his final game was played on March 26, 2004, in a 109 - 86 win over the Houston Rockets. Bell recorded 2 points, 1 turnover and 1 foul in only 4 minutes of playing time.

=== NBA Development League ===
In 2006, Bell took up boxing while working out for the NBA. He was selected as the 12th pick by the Albuquerque Thunderbirds in the first round of the 2006 NBA D-League draft. He was signed by the Austin Toros of the D-League when Jay Williams was waived due to injury in late December 2006.

=== Europe ===
Two seasons after 2003–04, Bell played briefly in Spain (Real Madrid) and in Germany (Frankfurt Skyliners). For the 2007–2008 season, he signed first for the Italian Serie A team, Angelico Biella, then on 12 March 2008 moved to Fastweb Casale Monferrato. He played the 2008–2009 and 2009–2010 seasons with Gruppo Triboldi Basket, also known for sponsorship reasons as Vanoli Soresina or Vanoli Cremona, in Serie A, the top level of Italian basketball. In August 2010 he signed with Entente Orléanaise in France.

In the spring of 2011, Bell played with Trenkwalder Reggio Emilia. In 2012, he signed with Pallacanestro Sant'Antimo, a second league club in Italy. In late February 2013, Bell rejoined Trenkwalder Reggio Emilia. The contract was signed for the end of the 2012–13 season with an option for 2013–14.

=== Argentina ===
On December 24, 2015, Bell signed with San Lorenzo of Argentina.

== See also ==
- List of NCAA Division I men's basketball career free throw scoring leaders
- List of NCAA Division I men's basketball career scoring leaders
