= 1982–83 Villanova Wildcats men's basketball team =

American college basketball season

1982–83 Villanova Wildcats men's basketball

Big East Regular season co-champions

NCAA Men's Division I Tournament, Elite Eight
- Conference: Big East Conference

Ranking
- Coaches: No. 11
- AP: No. 13
- Record: 24–8 (12–4 Big East)
- Head coach: Rollie Massimino (10th season)
- Assistant coaches: Mitch Buonaguro (6th season); Marty Marbach; Harry Booth
- Home arena: Villanova Field House

1982–83 Big East men's basketball standings
	Conf.				Overall
Team	W		L	PCT	W		L	PCT
No. 11 Boston College	12	–	4	.750	25	–	7	.781
No. 13 Villanova	12	–	4	.750	24	–	8	.750
No. 3 St. John's†	12	–	4	.750	28	–	5	.848
No. 20 Georgetown	11	–	5	.688	22	–	10	.688
Syracuse	9	–	7	.563	21	–	10	.677
Pittsburgh	6	–	10	.375	13	–	15	.464
Connecticut	5	–	11	.313	12	–	16	.429
Providence	4	–	12	.250	12	–	19	.387
Seton Hall	1	–	15	.063	6	–	23	.207
† 1983 Big East tournament winner Rankings from AP Poll

The 1982–83 Villanova Wildcats men's basketball team represented Villanova University during the 1982–83 NCAA Division I men's basketball season. The head coach was Rollie Massimino. The team played its home games at Villanova Field House in Villanova, Pennsylvania, and was a member of the Big East Conference. The team tied for the regular season Big East title and reached the Elite Eight of the NCAA tournament before falling to high-flying Houston, famously known as "Phi Slama Jama." Villanova finished with a 24–8 record (12–4 Big East).

== Roster ==
1982–83 Villanova Wildcats men's basketball team
Players
Coaches

Pos.	#	Name	Height	Weight	Year	Hometown
C	41	Chuck Everson	7 ft 1 in (2.16 m)	255 lb (116 kg)	Fr	Brentwood, New York
G	10	Stewart Granger	6 ft 3 in (1.91 m)	185 lb (84 kg)	Sr	Brooklyn, New York
G	20	Brian Harrington	6 ft 0 in (1.83 m)	165 lb (75 kg)	So	Pound Ridge, New York
G	13	Roland Massimino	5 ft 10 in (1.78 m)	165 lb (75 kg)	Fr	Villanova, Pennsylvania
G/F	33	Dwayne McClain	6 ft 6 in (1.98 m)	195 lb (88 kg)	So	Worcester, Massachusetts
G	22	Gary McLain	6 ft 0 in (1.83 m)	180 lb (82 kg)	So	Hempstead, New York
F/C	54	Ed Pinckney	6 ft 9 in (2.06 m)	205 lb (93 kg)	So	Bronx, New York
F	45	John Pinone	6 ft 8 in (2.03 m)	225 lb (102 kg)	Sr	Hartford, Connecticut
F	25	Steve Pinone	6 ft 4 in (1.93 m)	195 lb (88 kg)	So	Wethersfield, Connecticut
F	21	Harold Pressley	6 ft 7 in (2.01 m)	210 lb (95 kg)	Fr	Mystic, Connecticut
G	4	Dwight Wilbur	6 ft 2 in (1.88 m)	185 lb (84 kg)	Fr	Paterson, New Jersey

Head coach

- Rollie Massimino (Vermont)

Assistant coach(es)

- Mitch Buonaguro (Boston College)
- Marty Marbach (Saint Francis (PA))
- Harry Booth (Saint Joseph's)

Legend

- (C) Team captain
- (S) Suspended
- (I) Ineligible
- (W) Walk-on
- Injured
- Current redshirt

== Schedule and results ==
Date time, TV	Rank^{#}	Opponent^{#}	Result	Record	Site city, state
Regular season
Nov 28, 1982*	No. 5	Colgate	W 83–63	1–0	Villanova Field House; Villanova, Pennsylvania
Dec 4, 1982*	No. 4	at No. 3 Kentucky	L 79–93	1–1	Rupp Arena; Lexington, Kentucky
Dec 8, 1982*	No. 10	Marist	W 97–69	2–1	Villanova Field House; Villanova, Pennsylvania
Dec 11, 1982*	No. 10	vs. Pennsylvania	L 80–84	2–2	
Dec 18, 1982*	No. 19	vs. Temple	W 82–55	3–2	
Dec 22, 1982	No. 18	vs. Seton Hall	W 78–68	4–2 (1–0)	
Dec 29, 1982*	No. 16	vs. No. 19 Tulsa	W 75–68	5–2	San Diego Sports Arena; San Diego, California
Dec 30, 1982*	No. 16	at San Diego State	W 63–57	6–2	San Diego Sports Arena; San Diego, California
Jan 4, 1983	No. 14	vs. Boston College	W 79–72	7–2 (2–0)	Brendan Byrne Arena; East Rutherford, New Jersey
Jan 7, 1983*	No. 14	vs. Notre Dame	W 61–55	8–2	
Jan 12, 1983	No. 15	at Pittsburgh	W 66–48	9–2 (3–0)	Fitzgerald Field House; Pittsburgh, Pennsylvania
Jan 15, 1983	No. 15	Providence	W 70–61	10–2 (4–0)	Villanova Field House; Villanova, Pennsylvania
Jan 19, 1983	No. 13	vs. Seton Hall	W 75–59	11–2 (5–0)	
Jan 22, 1983*	No. 13	vs. La Salle	W 72–71	12–2	
Jan 24, 1983	No. 11	at No. 8 St. John's	L 71–80	12–3 (5–1)	Madison Square Garden; New York, New York
Jan 29, 1983	No. 11	vs. No. 18 Syracuse	W 83–75	13–3 (6–1)	
Jan 31, 1983	No. 11	vs. No. 15 Georgetown	W 68–67	14–3 (7–1)	Palestra (9,208); Philadelphia, Pennsylvania
Feb 5, 1983	No. 11	at Boston College	L 70–76	14–4 (7–2)	Roberts Center; Boston, Massachusetts
Feb 8, 1983	No. 12	Connecticut	W 86–79	15–4 (8–2)	Villanova Field House; Villanova, Pennsylvania
Feb 11, 1983	No. 12	Pittsburgh	W 78–65	16–4 (9–2)	Villanova Field House; Houston, Texas
Feb 13, 1983*	No. 12	at No. 1 North Carolina	W 56–53	17–4	Carmichael Auditorium; Chapel Hill, North Carolina
Feb 16, 1983	No. 8	at Providence	W 64–58	18–4 (10–2)	Dunkin' Donuts Center; Providence, Rhode Island
Feb 19, 1983	No. 8	at Connecticut	W 75–68	19–4 (11–2)	Hartford Civic Center; Storrs, Connecticut
Feb 22, 1983*	No. 7	vs. Saint Joseph's; Holy War	W 70–62	20–4	Spectrum; Philadelphia, Pennsylvania
Feb 26, 1983	No. 7	vs. No. 9 St. John's	W 71–70 ^{OT}	21–4 (12–2)	Spectrum; Philadelphia, Pennsylvania
Mar 1, 1983	No. 4	at No. 18 Syracuse	L 70–79	21–5 (12–3)	Carrier Dome; Syracuse, New York
Mar 5, 1983	No. 4	at No. 16 Georgetown	L 71–87	21–6 (12–4)	Capital Centre; Landover, Maryland
Big East tournament
Mar 10, 1983*	No. 13	vs. Connecticut; Big East tournament Quarterfinal	W 69–68	22–6	Madison Square Garden; New York, New York
Mar 11, 1983*	No. 13	at No. 8 St. John's; Big East tournament Semifinal	L 80–91	22–7	Madison Square Garden; New York, New York
NCAA tournament
Mar 19, 1983*	(3 MW) No. 13	vs. (11 MW) Lamar; Second Round	W 60–58	23–7	The Summit; Houston, Texas
Mar 25, 1983*	(3 MW) No. 13	vs. (7 MW) Iowa; Midwest Regional semifinal – Sweet Sixteen	W 55–54	24–7	Kemper Arena; Kansas City, Missouri
Mar 27, 1983*	(3 MW) No. 13	vs. (1 MW) No. 1 Houston; Midwest Regional final – Elite Eight	L 71–89	24–8	Kemper Arena; Kansas City, Missouri
*Non-conference game. ^{#}Rankings from AP poll. (#) Tournament seedings in parentheses. MW=Midwest.

== Rankings ==
Ranking movements Legend: ██ Increase in ranking ██ Decrease in ranking т = Tied with team above or below
	Week																
Poll	Pre	1	2	3	4	5	6	7	8	9	10	11	12	13	14	15	Final
AP	5	4	10	19	18	16	14	15	13	11	11	12	8	7	4	13	13
Coaches	7 т	7 т	9	18	16	17	14	17	14	12	11	14	9	7	5	12	11

== Awards and honors ==
- John Pinone – Robert V. Geasey Trophy (3x)

== NBA draft ==
Round	Pick	Player	NBA club
1	24	Stewart Granger	Cleveland Cavaliers
3	58	John Pinone	Atlanta Hawks
