= 1982–83 Pittsburgh Panthers men's basketball team =

American college basketball season

1982–83 Pittsburgh Panthers men's basketball
- Conference: Big East Conference (1979–2013)
- Record: 13–15 (6–10 Big East)
- Head coach: Roy Chipman (3rd season)
- Assistant coaches: Reggie Warford (3rd season); Seth Greenberg (3rd season); Dave Progar (3rd season)
- Home arena: Fitzgerald Field House (Capacity: 4,122)

1982–83 Big East men's basketball standings
	Conf.				Overall
Team	W		L	PCT	W		L	PCT
No. 11 Boston College	12	–	4	.750	25	–	7	.781
No. 13 Villanova	12	–	4	.750	24	–	8	.750
No. 3 St. John's†	12	–	4	.750	28	–	5	.848
No. 20 Georgetown	11	–	5	.688	22	–	10	.688
Syracuse	9	–	7	.563	21	–	10	.677
Pittsburgh	6	–	10	.375	13	–	15	.464
Connecticut	5	–	11	.313	12	–	16	.429
Providence	4	–	12	.250	12	–	19	.387
Seton Hall	1	–	15	.063	6	–	23	.207
† 1983 Big East tournament winner Rankings from AP Poll

The 1982–83 Pittsburgh Panthers men's basketball team represented the University of Pittsburgh in the 1982–83 NCAA Division I men's basketball season. Led by head coach Roy Chipman, the Panthers finished with a record of 13–15. This was Pitt's first season in the Big East Conference. They were previously members of the Eastern 8 Conference.
