= 1982–83 Connecticut Huskies men's basketball team =

American college basketball season

1982–83 Connecticut Huskies men's basketball
- Conference: Big East Conference
- Record: 12–16 (5–11 Big East)
- Head coach: Dom Perno (6th season)
- Assistant coaches: Greg Ashford; Howie Dickenman; Steve Siegrist; Bill Stuart
- Home arena: Hugh S. Greer Field House; New Haven Coliseum; Hartford Civic Center

1982–83 Big East men's basketball standings
	Conf.				Overall
Team	W		L	PCT	W		L	PCT
No. 11 Boston College	12	–	4	.750	25	–	7	.781
No. 13 Villanova	12	–	4	.750	24	–	8	.750
No. 3 St. John's†	12	–	4	.750	28	–	5	.848
No. 20 Georgetown	11	–	5	.688	22	–	10	.688
Syracuse	9	–	7	.563	21	–	10	.677
Pittsburgh	6	–	10	.375	13	–	15	.464
Connecticut	5	–	11	.313	12	–	16	.429
Providence	4	–	12	.250	12	–	19	.387
Seton Hall	1	–	15	.063	6	–	23	.207
† 1983 Big East tournament winner Rankings from AP Poll

The 1982–83 Connecticut Huskies men's basketball team represented the University of Connecticut in the 1982–83 collegiate men's basketball season. The Huskies completed the season with a 12–16 overall record. The Huskies were members of the Big East Conference where they finished with a 5–11 record. The Huskies played their home games at Hugh S. Greer Field House in Storrs, Connecticut, the New Haven Coliseum in New Haven, Connecticut, and the Hartford Civic Center in Hartford, Connecticut and were led by sixth-year head coach Dom Perno.

== Schedule ==
Date time, TV	Rank^{#}	Opponent^{#}	Result	Record	Site (attendance) city, state
Regular Season
11/30/1982*		at Yale	W 93–73	1–0	Payne Whitney Gymnasium; New Haven, Connecticut
12/3/1982*		at Arizona State; Fiesta Basketball Classic	L 64–79	1–1	Wells Fargo Arena; Tempe, Arizona
12/4/1982*		vs. Utah; Fiesta Basketball Classic	W 73–63	2–1	Wells Fargo Arena; Tempe, Arizona
12/7/1982*		Fairfield	L 81–98	2–2	New Haven Coliseum; New Haven, Connecticut
12/9/1982*		Massachusetts	W 86–74	3–2	Hugh S. Greer Field House; Storrs, Connecticut
12/11/1982*		at Boston University	W 51–50	4–2	Case Gym; Boston, Massachusetts
12/28/1982*		Air Force; Connecticut Mutual Classic	W 66–50	5–2	Hartford Civic Center; Hartford, Connecticut
12/29/1982*		Texas A&M; Connecticut Mutual Classic	W 69–63	6–2	Hartford Civic Center; Hartford, Connecticut
1/4/1983		at Pittsburgh	W 71–67	7–2 (1–0)	Fitzgerald Field House; Pittsburgh, Pennsylvania
1/6/1983*		at Manhattan	L 51–52	7–3	Draddy Gymnasium; New York City, New York
1/9/1983*		at New Hampshire	L 72–76	7–4	Lundholm Gym; Durham, New Hampshire
1/11/1983		St. John's	L 73–85	7–5 (1–1)	Hartford Civic Center; Hartford, Connecticut
1/15/1983		at Georgetown; Rivalry	L 53–74	7–6 (1–2)	Capital Centre; Landover, Maryland
1/19/1983*		Holy Cross	W 72–64	8–6	Hugh S. Greer Field House; Storrs, Connecticut
1/22/1983		Boston College	L 79–88	8–7 (1–3)	New Haven Coliseum; New Haven, Connecticut
1/26/1983		Providence	L 62–65	8–8 (1–4)	Hartford Civic Center; Hartford, Connecticut
1/29/1983		Seton Hall	W 78–47	9–8 (2–4)	Hugh S. Greer Field House; Storrs, Connecticut
2/2/1983		at Syracuse; Rivalry	L 69–89	9–9 (2–5)	Carrier Dome; Syracuse, New York
2/5/1983		Pittsburgh	L 71–72 ^{OT}	9–10 (2–6)	Hugh S. Greer Field House; Storrs, Connecticut
2/8/1983		at Villanova	L 79–86	9–11 (2–7)	Jake Nevin Field House; Villanova, Pennsylvania
2/12/1983		Georgetown; Rivalry	L 66–77	9–12 (2–8)	Hartford Civic Center; Hartford, Connecticut
2/14/1983		at St. John's	L 78–98	9–13 (2–9)	Carnesecca Arena; New York City, New York
2/19/1983		Villanova	L 68–75	9–14 (2–10)	Hartford Civic Center; Hartford, Connecticut
2/21/1983		at Boston College	L 80–86	9–15 (2–11)	Roberts Center; Boston, Massachusetts
2/26/1983		at Providence	W 72–62	10–15 (3–11)	Providence Civic Center; Providence, Rhode Island
3/1/1983		at Seton Hall	W 78–67	11–15 (4–11)	Brendan Byrne Arena; East Rutherford, New Jersey
3/5/1983		Syracuse; Rivalry	W 55–54	12–15 (5–11)	Hartford Civic Center; Hartford, Connecticut
Big East tournament
3/10/1983		vs. Villanova; Quarterfinals	L 68–69	12–16	Madison Square Garden; New York City, New York
*Non-conference game. ^{#}Rankings from AP Poll. (#) Tournament seedings in parentheses. All times are in Eastern Time.

Schedule Source:
