= 1982–83 Georgetown Hoyas men's basketball team =

American college basketball season

1982–83 Georgetown Hoyas men's basketball

Wendy's Classic Champions

NCAA tournament, Second Round
- Conference: Big East Conference

Ranking
- Coaches: No. 20
- AP: No. 20
- Record: 22–10 (11–5 Big East)
- Head coach: John Thompson (11th season)
- Assistant coaches: Craig Esherick (1st season); Mike Riley (1st season)
- Captain: Gene Smith
- Home arena: Capital Centre

1982–83 Big East men's basketball standings
	Conf.				Overall
Team	W		L	PCT	W		L	PCT
No. 11 Boston College	12	–	4	.750	25	–	7	.781
No. 13 Villanova	12	–	4	.750	24	–	8	.750
No. 3 St. John's†	12	–	4	.750	28	–	5	.848
No. 20 Georgetown	11	–	5	.688	22	–	10	.688
Syracuse	9	–	7	.563	21	–	10	.677
Pittsburgh	6	–	10	.375	13	–	15	.464
Connecticut	5	–	11	.313	12	–	16	.429
Providence	4	–	12	.250	12	–	19	.387
Seton Hall	1	–	15	.063	6	–	23	.207
† 1983 Big East tournament winner Rankings from AP Poll

The 1982–83 Georgetown Hoyas men's basketball team represented Georgetown University in the 1982–83 NCAA Division I college basketball season. John Thompson, coached them in his 11th season as head coach. They played their home games at the Capital Centre in Landover, Maryland. They were members of the Big East Conference and finished the season with a record of 22–10 overall, 11–5 in Big East play. They lost to Syracuse in the quarterfinals of the 1983 Big East tournament and advanced to the second round of the 1983 NCAA tournament before losing to Memphis State.

== Season recap ==
The season saw the arrival of former Georgetown players Craig Esherick and Mike Riley as assistant coaches. Esherick would serve as an assistant coach for 17 1/2 seasons before himself becoming head coach during the 1998–99 season, while Riley would be an assistant coach for 22 seasons before leaving after the 2003–04 season.

Georgetown had lost five players to graduation after the team's NCAA national runner-up performance the previous season and played a junior, three sophomores, and two freshmen most of the season, but center Patrick Ewing was returning for his sophomore year, and the team was ranked No. 2 as the season began. Pressure grew during the summer of 1982 for a game with No. 1 Virginia in the upcoming season, with arenas nationwide jockeying to host it; Georgetown insisted on hosting it at the Capital Centre. Three television networks bid on it, and Superstation TBS won the rights to it with a $550,000 bid; billed as the "Game of the Decade", it thus became the first major college sports event telecast exclusively on cable television. In the game, held on December 11, 1982, Virginia's veteran team won, 68–63, but Ewing at one point slam-dunked right over highly regarded Virginia center Ralph Sampson, a play which established Ewing as a dominating "big man".

Georgetown opened Big East play for the season on January 8, 1983, with a game against St. John's at Madison Square Garden in New York City. In both this and the second St. John's game of the season, 6-foot-3 Redmen guard Kevin Williams was given the task of harassing Ewing and goading him into retaliating, but Ewing nonetheless averaged 17 points and 13.5 rebounds in the two games combined. Harassment from the stands was a bigger problem. Ever since Ewing had committed to play at Georgetown in 1981, rumors and accusations had circulated among fans of other teams and sportswriters that Ewing was academically unworthy of Georgetown University and unable to pass his classes, and he endured cruel taunts about his intelligence and his race during Big East road games this season; opposing fans carried signs reading "EWING CAN'T READ THIS", "THINK EWING THINK", and "EWING IS AN APE", and some threw things such as banana peels at him on the court. During the game at Syracuse before a sell-out crowd in the Carrier Dome on January 10, 1983, a fan threw an orange at Ewing while he was attempting a free throw, narrowly missing him and prompting Syracuse head coach Jim Boeheim to grab a microphone and tell the crowd that he would pull his team off the court and forfeit the game to Georgetown if such behavior continued; he did not have to, but Georgetown won the game, 97–92. Through it all, Ewing kept his own counsel and continued to play, with a double-double in each of his first five Big East games, 25 points and 17 rebounds against Connecticut on January 15, 1983, 19 games in which he scored in double figures, and 10 games in which he scored 20 or more points and pulled down 10 or more rebounds. For the season, he led the team in scoring, averaging 17 points and 10 rebounds per game.

Freshman guard Michael Jackson joined the team this season. A starter from the first game, he quickly became an offensive standout who showed an ability to play both point guard and shooting guard. In the game at Syracuse in which someone threw an orange at Ewing, Jackson shot 9-for-13 from the field and 13-for-15 from the free-throw line to score 31 points and lead the Hoyas to the win. Against Boston College, he scored 21 points. Over the course of the season, he shot 46% from the field and 82% from the free-throw line, led the team in scoring in five games, averaged 14.1 points per game in Big East conference play, and finished behind only Ewing as the team's second-highest scorer.

Another newcomer was freshman guard-forward David Wingate, who displayed a defensive ability that allowed him to shut down many opponents. He played in all 32 games, shot 44% from the field, and scored in double figures 24 times, including a season-high 24-point performance against American.

Sophomore forward Bill Martin had been a reserve the previous season, but he became a starter this year, playing in all 32 games. He had 30 points and seven rebounds against Alabama State and 24 points and seven rebounds against Alabama. In Big East play, he reliably scored 10 points a game and shot 37-for-43 (86%) from the free-throw line. He finished the season averaging 6.3 rebounds per game, second only to Ewing.

Junior guard-forward Fred Brown had undergone knee surgery before the season began and recovering from it limited his playing time. He came off the bench to play in one game in December 1982, started 14 games in mid-season, then played in only two more games, both as a reserve, after the February 9, 1983, game against St. John's.

Junior guard and team captain Gene Smith, a defensive specialist, played a critical role in leading the young team, especially with Fred Brown limited for much of the year. He led the Hoyas in steals and assists and finished the season with nearly a two-to-one assist-to-turnover ratio.

The Hoyas finished in fourth place in the Big East, their 11–-5 conference record earning them a bye in the first round of the 1983 Big East men's basketball tournament, but they lost their first game of the tournament to Syracuse in the quarterfinals. They were the No. 5 seed in the Midwest Region of the 1983 NCAA Division I men's basketball tournament – the fifth of 14 consecutive Georgetown NCAA tournament appearances – and advanced to the second round before losing to the Midwest Region's No. 4 seed, 17th-ranked Memphis State.

The least successful of the four teams of the Ewing era and the only one not to reach the NCAA national championship game, the 1982–83 Hoyas nonetheless had performed well, especially given their youth and inexperience. They were ranked No. 20 in the season's final Associated Press Poll and Coaches' Poll, and the average attendance at their home games for the season was 14th-highest in the country.

== Roster ==
Sophomore center Patrick Ewing returned to Georgetown as head coach from 2017 to 2023.

1982–83 Georgetown Hoyas men's basketball team
Players
Coaches

Pos.	#	Name	Height	Weight	Year	Previous school	Hometown
F	42	David Blue	6 ft 7 in (2.01 m)	—	Sr	Prospect Hall	Frederick, MD
G	32	Horace Broadnax	6 ft 0 in (1.83 m)	190 lb (86 kg)	Fr	Plant City	Plant City, FL
G	20	Fred Brown	6 ft 5 in (1.96 m)	190 lb (86 kg)	Jr	Adlai E. Stevenson	Bronx, NY
C	52	Ralph Dalton	6 ft 9 in (2.06 m)	—	So	Fishburne Military School	Suitland, MD
F	25	David Dunn	6 ft 7 in (2.01 m)	—	Fr	Pebblebrook	Mableton, GA
C	33	Patrick Ewing	7 ft 0 in (2.13 m)	240 lb (109 kg)	So	Cambridge Rindge and Latin	Cambridge, MA
G	30	Michael Jackson	6 ft 2 in (1.88 m)	175 lb (79 kg)	Fr	South Lakes	Reston, VA
F	11	Anthony Jones	6 ft 6 in (1.98 m)	—	So	Dunbar	Washington, D.C.
G	10	Kurt Kaull	6 ft 3 in (1.91 m)	—	Sr	Wheaton Warrenville South	Wheaton, IL
F	24	Bill Martin	6 ft 7 in (2.01 m)	215 lb (98 kg)	So	McKinley Tech	Washington, D.C.
F	55	Victor Morris	6 ft 9 in (2.06 m)	—	Fr	Kashmere	Houston, TX
G	12	Elvado Smith	6 ft 2 in (1.88 m)	—	So	South River	Harwood, MD
G	22	Gene Smith (C)	6 ft 2 in (1.88 m)	170 lb (77 kg)	Jr	McKinley Tech	Washington, D.C.
F	40	David Wingate	6 ft 5 in (1.96 m)	185 lb (84 kg)	Fr	Dunbar	Baltimore, MD

Head coach

- John Thompson

Assistant coach(es)

- Craig Esherick
- Mike Riley

Legend

- (C) Team captain
- (S) Suspended
- (I) Ineligible
- (W) Walk-on
- Injured
- Current redshirt

== Rankings ==
Ranking movement Legend: ██ Improvement in ranking. ██ Decrease in ranking. ██ Not ranked the previous week. RV=Others receiving votes.
Poll	Pre	Wk 1	Wk 2	Wk 3	Wk 4	Wk 5	Wk 6	Wk 7	Wk 8	Wk 9	Wk 10	Wk 11	Wk 12	Wk 13	Wk 14	Wk 15	Final
AP	2	2	3	5	11	10	17		19	15	14	14	14	18	16	15	20
Coaches	3	– (Note: No Coaches' Poll this week.)	3	7	12	13	17		16	15	16	13	14	18	16	14	20

== Schedule and results ==
Sources

- All times are Eastern

Date time, TV	Rank^{#}	Opponent^{#}	Result	Record	Site (attendance) city, state
Regular Season
Fri., Nov. 26, 1982*	No. 2	at Brigham Young-Hawaii	W 72−52	1–0	George Q. Cannon Activities Center (2,690); Laie, HI
Sat., Nov. 27, 1982*	No. 2	at Hawaii-Hilo	W 67−37	2–0	Civic Auditorium (3,000); Hilo, HI
Tue., Nov. 30, 1982*	No. 2	Morgan State	W 91−58	3–0	Capital Centre (9,226); Landover, MD
Fri., Dec. 3, 1982*	No. 2	vs. Saint Francis; Wendy's Classic	W 75−40	4–0	E. A. Diddle Arena (8,300); Bowling Green, KY
Sat., Dec. 4, 1982*	No. 2	at Western Kentucky; Wendy's Classic	W 70–66 ^{OT}	5–0	E. A. Diddle Arena (10,400); Bowling Green, KY
Wed., Dec. 8, 1982*	No. 3	Alabama State	W 99–76	6–0	Capital Centre (9,666); Landover, MD
Sat., Dec. 11, 1982*; TBS	No. 3	No. 1 Virginia	L 63–68	6–1	Capital Centre (19,035); Landover, MD
Wed., Dec. 15, 1982*	No. 5	American	L 61-62	6–2	Capital Centre (9,902); Landover, MD
Wed., Dec. 22, 1982*	No. 11	Southern	W 80–65	7–2	Capital Centre (8,280); Landover, MD
Tue., Dec. 28, 1982*	No. 11	vs. Wisconsin; Winston Tire Classic	W 71−43	8–2	Los Angeles Memorial Sports Arena (9,161); Los Angeles, CA
Wed., Dec. 29, 1982*	No. 10	vs. No. 6 Alabama; Winston Tire Classic	L 73−94	8–3	Los Angeles Memorial Sports Arena (10,940); Los Angeles, CA
Wed., Jan. 5, 1983*	No. 10	Monmouth	W 82–59	9−3	Capital Centre (8,868); Landover, MD
Sat., Jan. 8, 1983	No. 17	at No. 7 St. John's	L 67–76	9–4 (0–1)	Madison Square Garden (19,591); New York, NY
Mon., Jan. 10, 1983	No. 17	at No. 9 Syracuse; Rivalry	W 97–92	10–4 (1–1)	Carrier Dome (31,327); Syracuse, NY
Sat., Jan. 15, 1983		Connecticut; Rivalry	W 74–53	11–4 (2–1)	Capital Centre (8,665); Landover, MD
Wed., Jan. 19, 1983	No. 19	Pittsburgh	W 62–54	12–4 (3–1)	Capital Centre (9,955); Landover, MD
Sat., Jan. 22, 1983	No. 15	at Providence	W 78–70	13–4 (4–1)	Providence Civic Center (12,247); Providence, RI
Wed., Jan. 26, 1983	No. 15	Seton Hall	W 71–48	14–4 (5–1)	Capital Centre (10,316); Landover, MD
Sat., Jan. 29, 1983	No. 15	Boston College	W 69–67	15–4 (6–1)	Capital Centre (13,872); Landover, MD
Mon., Jan 31, 1983	No. 15	at No. 11 Villanova	L 67–68	15–5 (6–2)	Palestra (9,208); Philadelphia, PA
Sun., Feb. 6, 1983*	No. 14	DePaul	W 71–65	16–5	Capital Centre (N/A); Landover, MD
Wed., Feb. 9, 1983	No. 14	No. 7 St. John's	L 69–75	16−6 (6–3)	Capital Centre (17,166); Landover, MD
Mon., Feb. 14, 1983	No. 14	at Connecticut; Rivalry	W 77–60	17–6 (7–3)	Hartford Civic Center (14,454); Hartford, CT
Sat., Feb. 19, 1983	No. 14	at Pittsburgh	L 63–65	17–7 (7–4)	Fitzgerald Field House (6,180); Pittsburgh, PA
Wed., Feb 23, 1983	No. 18	Providence	W 86–62	18–7 (8–4)	Capital Centre (9,749); Landover, MD
Sat., Feb. 26, 1983	No. 18	at Seton Hall	W 71–60	19–7 (9–4)	Brendan Byrne Arena (7,818); East Rutherford, NJ
Wed., Mar. 2, 1983	No. 16	at No. 15 Boston College	L 85–87 ^{OT}	19–8 (9–5)	Roberts Center (14,141); Chestnut Hill, MA
Sat., Mar. 5, 1983	No. 16	No. 4 Villanova	W 87–51	20–8 (10–5)	Capital Centre (16,770); Landover, MD
Mon., Mar. 7, 1983	No. 16	No. 18 Syracuse; Rivalry	W 80–75	21–8 (11–5)	Capital Centre (13,162); Landover, MD
Big East tournament
Thu., Mar. 10, 1983	No. 15	vs. No. 18 Syracuse; Quarterfinal/Rivalry	L 72–79	21–9	Madison Square Garden (19,591); New York, NY
NCAA Tournament
Thu., Mar. 17, 1983	(5 MW) No. 20	vs. (12 MW) Alcorn State; Midwest Region First Round	W 68–63	22–9	Freedom Hall (12,745); Louisville, KY
Sat., Mar. 19, 1983	(5 MW) No. 20	vs. (4 MW) No. 17 Memphis State; Midwest Region Second Round	L 57–66	22–10	Freedom Hall (16,105); Louisville, KY
*Non-conference game. ^{#}Rankings from AP Poll. (#) Tournament seedings in parentheses.
