= 1982–83 St. John's Redmen basketball team =

American college basketball season

1982–83 St. John's Redmen men's basketball

Lapchick Memorial champions ECAC Holiday Festival champions Big East tournament champions Big East regular season co–champions

1983 NCAA tournament, Sweet Sixteen
- Conference: Big East Conference (1979–2013)

Ranking
- Coaches: No. 3
- AP: No. 3
- Record: 28–5 (12–4 Big East)
- Head coach: Lou Carnesecca
- Assistant coaches: Brian Mahoney; Al LoBalbo; Ron Rutledge
- Home arena: Alumni Hall; Madison Square Garden

1982–83 Big East men's basketball standings
	Conf.				Overall
Team	W		L	PCT	W		L	PCT
No. 11 Boston College	12	–	4	.750	25	–	7	.781
No. 13 Villanova	12	–	4	.750	24	–	8	.750
No. 3 St. John's†	12	–	4	.750	28	–	5	.848
No. 20 Georgetown	11	–	5	.688	22	–	10	.688
Syracuse	9	–	7	.563	21	–	10	.677
Pittsburgh	6	–	10	.375	13	–	15	.464
Connecticut	5	–	11	.313	12	–	16	.429
Providence	4	–	12	.250	12	–	19	.387
Seton Hall	1	–	15	.063	6	–	23	.207
† 1983 Big East tournament winner Rankings from AP Poll

The 1982–83 St. John's Redmen basketball team represented St. John's University during the 1982–83 NCAA Division I men's basketball season. The team was coached by Lou Carnesecca in his fifteenth year at the school. St. John's home games are played at Alumni Hall and Madison Square Garden and the team is a member of the Big East Conference. The team had an overall record of 28–5 (12–4 Big East) They advanced to the Sweet Sixteen in the 1983 NCAA Tournament before losing to Georgia 70–67.

== Roster ==
1982–83 St. John's Red Storm men's basketball team
Players
Coaches

Pos.	#	Name	Height	Weight	Year	Previous school	Hometown
G	4	George Garrison	6 ft 0 in (1.83 m)	170 lb (77 kg)	Sr	Bellport	Bellport, NY
G	10	Bob Kelly	6 ft 2 in (1.88 m)	—	RS Sr	Delbarton/Holy Cross	South Orange, NJ
F	11	David Russell (C)	6 ft 7 in (2.01 m)	215 lb (98 kg)	Sr	Bellport	Bellport, NY
G	12	Kevin Williams	6 ft 2 in (1.88 m)	175 lb (79 kg)	Sr	Charles E. Hughes	New York, NY
G	15	Rob James	6 ft 4 in (1.93 m)	190 lb (86 kg)	Fr	Long Island Lutheran	Hempstead, NY
G/F	20	Chris Mullin	6 ft 6 in (1.98 m)	205 lb (93 kg)	So	Power Memorial/Xaverian	Brooklyn, NY
F/C	22	Jeff Allen	6 ft 10 in (2.08 m)	235 lb (107 kg)	RS Jr	Norwalk/Rutgers	Norwalk, CT
C	23	Bill Wennington	7 ft 0 in (2.13 m)	245 lb (111 kg)	So	Long Island Lutheran	Wheatley Heights, NY
G	24	Mike Moses (redshirt)	5 ft 11 in (1.8 m)	160 lb (73 kg)	Jr	Tolentine/Florida	New York, NY
F/C	32	Trevor Jackson (C)	6 ft 8 in (2.03 m)	—	Sr	Springfield Gardens	Rosedale, NY
F	33	Ron Stewart	6 ft 8 in (2.03 m)	212 lb (96 kg)	So	Brentwood	Brentwood, NY
G/F	35	Billy Goodwin	6 ft 5 in (1.96 m)	220 lb (100 kg)	Sr	Columbus/San Jacinto	Bronx, NY
F	42	Mike Feigenbaum (injured)	6 ft 6 in (1.98 m)	205 lb (93 kg)	RS Jr	Lawrence/Ohio/Wagner	Cedarhurst, NY

Head coach

- Lou Carnesecca (St. John's, '50)

Assistant coach(es)

- Brian Mahoney
- Al LoBalbo
- Ron Rutledge

Legend

- (C) Team captain
- (S) Suspended
- (I) Ineligible
- (W) Walk-on
- Injured
- Current redshirt

== Schedule and results ==
Date time, TV	Rank^{#}	Opponent^{#}	Result	Record	Site city, state
Regular Season
11/20/82*	No. 19	vs. No. 3 North Carolina; Tip-Off Classic	W 78–74 ^{OT}	1–0	Springfield Civic Center; Springfield, MA
11/26/82*	No. 19	Army; Lapchick Tournament Opening Round	W 81–38	2–0	Alumni Hall; Queens, NY
11/27/82*	No. 19	Ohio; Lapchick Tournament Championship	W 62–52	3–0	Alumni Hall; Queens, NY
12/01/82*	No. 12	at Columbia	W 72–45	4–0	Levien Gymnasium; New York, NY
12/04/82	No. 12	at Providence	W 61–60	5–0 (1–0)	Providence Civic Center; Providence, RI
12/08/82*	No. 12	Fairleigh Dickinson	W 87–65	6–0	Alumni Hall; Queens, NY
12/11/82*	No. 12	at Niagara	W 88–53	7–0	Niagara Falls Convention Center; Niagara Falls, NY
12/15/82*	No. 9	at Fordham	W 74–66	8–0	Rose Hill Gymnasium; Bronx, NY
12/18/82*	No. 9	Princeton	W 58–46	9–0	Alumni Hall; Queens, NY
12/27/82*	No. 7	vs. Brigham Young; ECAC Holiday Festival Semifinal	W 75–64	10–0	Madison Square Garden; New York, NY
12/29/82*	No. 7	vs. Wake Forest; ECAC Holiday Festival Championship	W 72–65	11–0	Madison Square Garden; New York, NY
01/03/83	No. 7	at Seton Hall	W 79–62	12–0 (2–0)	Meadowlands Arena; East Rutherford, NJ
01/08/83	No. 7	No. 17 Georgetown	W 76–67	13–0 (3–0)	Madison Square Garden; New York, NY
01/11/83	No. 3	at Connecticut	W 85–73	14–0 (4–0)	Hartford Civic Center; Hartford, CT
01/15/83	No. 3	at Boston College	L 64–68	14–1 (4–1)	Roberts Center; Chestnut Hill, MA
01/18/83	No. 8	Providence	W 74–54	15–1 (5–1)	Alumni Hall; Queens, NY
01/22/83	No. 8	at No. 15 Syracuse	W 68–57	16–1 (6–1)	Carrier Dome; Syracuse, NY
01/24/83	No. 8	No. 13 Villanova	W 80–71	17–1 (7–1)	Alumni Hall; Queens, NY
01/29/83*	No. 7	at Manhattan	W 65–58	18–1	Draddy Gymnasium; Bronx, NY
02/01/83	No. 5	at Pittsburgh	L 71–72	18–2 (7–2)	Fitzgerald Field House; Pittsburgh, PA
02/05/83	No. 5	Seton Hall	W 82–57	19–2 (8–2)	Alumni Hall; Queens, NY
02/09/83	No. 7	at No. 14 Georgetown	W 75–69	20–2 (9–2)	Capital Centre; Landover, MD
02/15/83	No. 6	No. 18 Boston College	L 75–92	20–3 (9–3)	Alumni Hall; Queens, NY
02/17/83	No. 6	Connecticut	W 98–78	21–3 (10–3)	Alumni Hall; Queens, NY
02/20/83*	No. 6	DePaul	W 64–52	22–3	Madison Square Garden; New York, NY
02/23/83	No. 9	No. 13 Syracuse	W 85–69	23–3 (11–3)	Alumni Hall; Queens, NY
02/26/83	No. 9	at No. 7 Villanova	L 70–71 ^{OT}	23–4 (11–4)	Spectrum; Philadelphia, PA
03/05/83	No. 10	Pittsburgh	W 91–73	24–4 (12–4)	Alumni Hall; Queens, NY
Big East Tournament
03/10/83	(3) No. 8	vs. (6) Pittsburgh; Quarterfinals	W 64–53	25–4	Madison Square Garden; New York, NY
03/11/83	(3) No. 8	vs. (2) No. 13 Villanova; Semifinals	W 91–80	26–4	Madison Square Garden; New York, NY
03/12/83	(3) No. 8	vs. (1) No. 14 Boston College; Championship	W 85–77	27–4	Madison Square Garden; New York, NY
NCAA Tournament
03/20/83*	(1 E) No. 3	vs. (9 E) Rutgers; Second Round	W 66–55	28–4	Hartford Civic Center; Hartford, CT
03/25/83*	(1 E) No. 3	vs. (4 E) No. 18 Georgia; Sweet Sixteen	L 67–70	28–5	Carrier Dome; Syracuse, NY
*Non-conference game. ^{#}Rankings from AP Poll. (#) Tournament seedings in parentheses.

== Rankings ==
Ranking movements Legend: ██ Increase in ranking ██ Decrease in ranking
	Week																
Poll	Pre	1	2	3	4	5	6	7	8	9	10	11	12	13	14	15	Final
AP	19	12	12	9	7	7	7	3	8	7	5	7	6	9	10	8	3
Coaches	19	19	13	10	8	7	7	3	7	6	4	7	6	8	8	8	3

== Team players drafted into the NBA ==
Round	Pick	Player	NBA club
2	37	David Russell	Denver Nuggets
2	46	Kevin Williams	San Antonio Spurs
3	65	Billy Goodwin	Milwaukee Bucks
10	223	Bob Kelly	Milwaukee Bucks
