= 1982–83 Princeton Tigers men's basketball team =

American college basketball season

1982–83 Princeton Tigers men's basketball

Ivy League Champion

1983 NCAA Division I men's basketball tournament, Second round
- Conference: Ivy League
- Record: 20–9 (12–2, 1st Ivy)
- Head coach: Pete Carril (16th season)
- Captains: Gary Knapp; Craig Robinson
- Home arena: Jadwin Gymnasium

1982–83 Ivy League men's basketball standings
	Conf.				Overall
Team	W		L	PCT	W		L	PCT
Princeton	12	–	2	.857	20	–	9	.690
Penn	11	–	3	.786	17	–	9	.654
Yale	7	–	7	.500	12	–	14	.462
Columbia	7	–	7	.500	10	–	16	.385
Cornell	6	–	8	.429	10	–	16	.385
Brown	6	–	8	.429	9	–	17	.346
Harvard	4	–	10	.286	12	–	14	.462
Dartmouth	3	–	11	.214	7	–	19	.269
Rankings from AP Poll

The 1982–83 Princeton Tigers men's basketball team represented Princeton University in intercollegiate college basketball during the 1982–83 NCAA Division I men's basketball season. The head coach was Pete Carril and the team co-captains were Gary Knapp and Craig Robinson. The team played its home games in the Jadwin Gymnasium on the University campus in Princeton, New Jersey. The team was the champion of the Ivy League, which earned them an invitation to the 52-team 1983 NCAA Division I men's basketball tournament.

The team posted a 20–9 overall record and a 12–2 conference record. By winning the Ivy League's automatic bid, Princeton was one of the first two teams to earn entry into the tournament. In a 1983 NCAA Division I men's basketball tournament preliminary round game on March 15 at The Palestra in Philadelphia, Pennsylvania, the team defeated North Carolina A&T 53–41. Then, in the March 18 West Regional first round game at the Gill Coliseum in Corvallis, Oregon against the Oklahoma State Cowboys the team won 56–53 before losing its March 20 second round match against Boston College Eagles 51–42.

The team was led by first team All-Ivy League selections Robinson, who was named Ivy League Men's Basketball Player of the Year. Robinson was drafted by the Philadelphia 76ers in the 1983 NBA draft with the 93rd overall selection in the fourth round, while Rich Simkus was selected by the New Jersey Nets with the 222nd selection in the 10th Round. The team was the national statistical champion in scoring defense with an average of 50.1 points allowed.
