= Chris Mullin =

American basketball player & coach (born 1963)

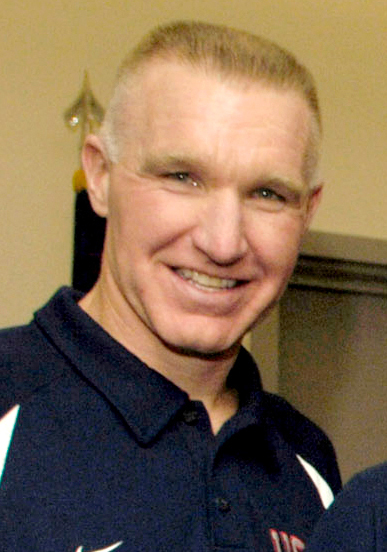
- Mullin in 2006

Personal information
- Born: July 30, 1963 (age 63) Brooklyn, New York, U.S.
- Listed height: 6 ft 7 in (2.01 m)
- Listed weight: 200 lb (91 kg)

Career information
- High school: Power Memorial (New York City, New York); Xaverian (Brooklyn, New York)
- College: St. John's (1981–1985)
- NBA draft: 1985: 1st round, 7th overall pick
- Drafted by: Golden State Warriors
- Playing career: 1985–2001
- Position: Small forward / shooting guard
- Number: 17
- Coaching career: 2015–2019

Career history

Playing
- 1985–1997: Golden State Warriors
- 1997–2000: Indiana Pacers
- 2000–2001: Golden State Warriors

Coaching
- 2015–2019: St. John's

Career highlights
- 5× NBA All-Star (1989–1993); All-NBA First Team (1992); 2× All-NBA Second Team (1989, 1991); All-NBA Third Team (1990); No. 17 retired by Golden State Warriors; John R. Wooden Award (1985); USBWA Player of the Year (1985); UPI College Player of the Year (1985); Consensus first-team All-American (1985); Consensus second-team All-American (1984); Third-team All-American – UPI (1983); 3× Big East Player of the Year (1983–1985); 3× First-team All-Big East (1983–1985); Second-team All-Big East (1982); Big East tournament MVP (1983); 3× Haggerty Award winner (1983–1985); No. 20 honored by St. John's Red Storm; McDonald's All-American (1981)

Career NBA statistics
- Points: 17,911 (18.2 ppg)
- Rebounds: 4,034 (4.1 rpg)
- Assists: 3,450 (3.5 apg)
- Stats at NBA.com
- Stats at Basketball Reference
- Basketball Hall of Fame
- Collegiate Basketball Hall of Fame
Medals
Men's basketball
Representing the United States
Olympic Games
Gold medal – first place	1984 Los Angeles	Team competition
Gold medal – first place	1992 Barcelona	Team competition
Pan American Games
Gold medal – first place	1983 Caracas	Team competition
FIBA Americas Championship
Gold medal – first place	1992 Portland	Men's basketball

Christopher Paul Mullin (born July 30, 1963) is an American former professional basketball player, executive and coach. He is a five-time NBA All-Star and four-time All-NBA Team member. He is also two-time Olympic Gold medalist and a two-time Naismith Memorial Basketball Hall of Fame inductee (in 2010 as a member of the 1992 United States men's Olympic basketball team—"The Dream Team"—and in 2011 for his individual career).

Mullin played shooting guard and small forward in the National Basketball Association (NBA) from 1985 to 2001. During his college basketball career for the St. John's Redmen, he was named Big East Player of the Year three times and was a member of the 1984 U.S. Men's Olympic Basketball team, Mullin was chosen as the seventh pick by the Golden State Warriors in the first round of the 1985 NBA draft. He returned to the Olympics in 1992 as a member of the "Dream Team", which was the first American Olympic basketball team to include professional players.

He played with the Warriors from 1985 until 1997. Thereafter, Mullin played with the Indiana Pacers from 1997 until the 1999–2000 season. He retired after the 2000–01 season, playing for his original team, the Warriors. He later served as special advisor for the Sacramento Kings and general manager of the Golden State Warriors.

Mullin served as the head coach of the Red Storm men's basketball team from 2015 to 2019.

== Early life ==
Mullin was born in Brooklyn, New York. As a young player in New York, he studied the games of Knicks stars Walt Frazier and Earl Monroe while admiring Larry Bird and wearing #17 in honor of John Havlicek. As a youth, he regularly traveled to the Bronx and Harlem, in predominantly Black neighborhoods, to play against the best basketball players in New York City. His name began to spread while playing CYO basketball at St. Thomas Aquinas Parish on Flatlands Avenue. He was also a winner of the 1974 "Elks Hoops Shoot" which is a national free throw contest for youth.

Along with playing CYO basketball at St. Thomas Aquinas Parish, Mullin attended Lou Carnesecca's basketball camp with future Xaverian teammates Roger McCready, Danny Treacy, Jimmy Howard, Gerard Shepard, Mike O'Reilly, Joe Cannizzo and Pete Cannizzo.

Mullin began his high school career at Power Memorial Academy, where he was a teammate of Mario Elie. He transferred as a junior to Xaverian High School and led them to a New York Class A state championship in 1981.

== College career ==
Mullin was recruited by the Hall of Fame coach Lou Carnesecca to play for St. John's University in nearby Queens. After signing, Mullin averaged 16.6 points per game in his freshman year (also setting the school freshman record for points scored). In his subsequent three years for the Redmen (now known as the Red Storm), he was named Big East Player of the Year three times, named to the All-America team three times, played for the gold medal-winning 1984 Olympic team, and received the 1985 Wooden Award and USBWA College Player of the Year.

As a senior who averaged 19.8 points per game, Mullin led St. John's to the 1985 Final Four and its first #1 ranking since 1951. Mullin, who averaged 19.5 points per game, finished his career as the Redmen's all-time leading scorer with 2,440 career points. He also holds the distinction of being one of only three players in history to win the Haggerty Award (given to the best college player in the New York City area) three times (1983–1985). From 1983 to 1985, Mullin was also named the Big East conference's player of the year, making him the only men's basketball player to receive this award three different seasons.

== Professional career ==
=== Golden State Warriors (1985–1997) ===
In the 1985 NBA draft, the Golden State Warriors selected Mullin in the first round with the seventh pick. In Mullin's first three seasons with the Warriors, he was primarily a spot-up shooting guard playing in the backcourt alongside Eric "Sleepy" Floyd.

In his second season, 1986–87, the Warriors advanced to the Western Conference semifinals under George Karl, where they lost to the eventual NBA champion Los Angeles Lakers. The next season, Don Nelson became the Warriors' coach and had plans to move Mullin to small forward. During his third season in the NBA, Mullin admitted to Nelson that he was an alcoholic. After missing several practices, Mullin was suspended, then entered an alcohol rehabilitation program.

For five consecutive seasons, from 1988 until 1993, Mullin scored an average of 25 or more points and five rebounds. Additionally, the Warriors made five straight playoff appearances. Mullin, Mitch Richmond, and 1989 first-round draftee Tim Hardaway formed the trio "Run TMC" (the initials of the players' first names and a play on the name of the popular rap group Run–D.M.C.) that were the focal stars of this playoff run. Mullin was a five-time All-Star during his time in Golden State and won his second Olympic gold medal in 1992 as a member of the Dream Team.

In 1993, Nelson traded for Chris Webber on NBA Draft day, hoping to make the Warriors stronger in the frontcourt. Mullin's body began breaking down, and he began to miss significant numbers of games. The Warriors had a successful first season with Webber, but he and Nelson began to bicker over his use as a player. This led Nelson to resign, and subsequent coaches saw Mullin as injury-prone and began to center the team around Latrell Sprewell.

=== Indiana Pacers (1997–2000) ===
Mullin was traded after the 1996–97 season to the Indiana Pacers for second-year center Erick Dampier and NBA journeyman Duane Ferrell.

In his first season with the Pacers, coached by Larry Bird, Mullin started all 82 games, averaged 11.3 points per game, and helped the Pacers to the Eastern Conference Finals, where they lost to the Chicago Bulls in seven games. He had a career high in 3-point shots made (107) and led the NBA in free-throw percentage (.939) that season as well. Bird began to phase Mullin out and give more time to Jalen Rose at small forward during his second season with the team. As a member of the Indiana Pacers, Mullin, who was primarily a bench player at this time, appeared in three games of the 2000 NBA Finals against the Los Angeles Lakers and scored four points total. After that season, Mullin was waived by the Pacers.

=== Return to Golden State (2000–2001) ===
Mullin again signed with Warriors for the 2000–01 season, his last season as a player.

=== Legacy ===
According to Jim O'Brien, Mullin was similar to NBA legend Larry Bird because both players lacked speed, had a great outside shot and had the innate ability to put their defender off guard. He was on the All-NBA second team (1989 and 1991), third team (1990), and first team (1992).

== National team career ==
During the 1992 Summer Olympics, Mullin, who started two games, averaged 12.9 points per game, shot 61.9% from the field and 53.8% from the three-point line. He was a member of the "Dream Team," which is widely regarded as one of the greatest sports teams ever.

Mullin also won gold medals in the 1992 Tournament of the Americas with the "Dream Team", the 1984 Summer Olympics, the 1983 Pan American Games, the 1982 Jones Cup, and the 1982 Seoul Invitational.

== Coaching career ==
=== St. John's (2015–2019) ===
On March 30, 2015, Mullin accepted the vacant head coaching position at St. John's University. In the 2018–19 season, his team reached the NCAA tournament as they went 21-13 and reached the First Four. The 21 wins matched their highest total since 1999–2000.

On April 9, 2019, Mullin resigned as head coach after compiling a 59–73 record in four seasons, including 20–52 in Big East play, citing a "personal loss" which was widely seen as the death of his brother.

== Executive career ==
After his playing days were over, Mullin was hired by the Warriors as a special assistant, dealing with daily business operations. On April 22, 2004, he was named Executive Vice President of Basketball Operations for the team. On May 11, 2009, the team announced that Mullin's expiring contract would not be renewed. He was replaced by Larry Riley as the Warriors' General Manager.

Mullin began working with the Sacramento Kings in May 2013 when Vivek Ranadivé became owner. In September 2013, the Sacramento Kings hired him as an advisor. As an advisor, Mullin's duties were not only to provide advice to Ranadive and D'Alessandro on player transactions, but to also supervise the organization's college and overseas scouting program.

== Broadcasting career ==
Mullin has worked as an NBA analyst for ESPN. On October 22, 2010, Mullin made his network debut as an ESPN studio analyst on Kia NBA Countdown.

In December 2011, Mullin worked with the ESPN broadcasting crew for Mark Jackson's coaching debut with the Golden State Warriors. Mullin joined his former television colleagues, Jeff Van Gundy and Mike Breen to announce the game against the Los Angeles Clippers in the season opener and Christmas finale.

In September 2019, after leaving St. John's University, Mullin was announced as a pregame and postgame studio analyst for Warriors games on NBC Sports Bay Area. He also will contribute to Warriors coverage on radio affiliate KNBR.

== Honors ==
In 2010, Mullin was inducted into the Naismith Memorial Basketball Hall of Fame as part of the "Dream Team".

On February 28, 2011, Mullin was elected to the College Basketball Hall of Fame.

On April 4, 2011, Mullin was inducted again to the Naismith Memorial Basketball Hall of Fame, this time for his individual career.

On March 19, 2012, Mullin's number 17 was retired by the Golden State Warriors, making him the sixth player in team history to have his jersey retired.

== Personal life ==
Mullin is a devout Catholic, and has stated that he relies upon his faith daily. He and his wife, Elizabeth ("Liz"), live in Flower Hill, New York. They have four children. Mullin was very good friends with former teammate, Sudanese NBA player Manute Bol. After Bol was badly injured in a taxi cab incident in 2004, Mullin and the Warriors offered to raise money for Bol's medical bills by organizing a fantasy camp. On November 19, 2004, the Warriors, Mullin and his former teammates Mitch Richmond and Tim Hardaway participated in the fantasy camp named "Run With TMC".

In March 2012, PG&E joined the Golden State Warriors to restore a pair of basketball courts in Mullin's honor. Both courts were named the "Chris Mullin Basketball Courts at Arroyo Recreation Center Presented by PG&E".

In July 2014, Mullin was featured at a wheelchair basketball charity and opportunity event hosted in Puerto Rico by Max International. Before the event, he was presented a jersey from Federacion de Baloncesto en Silla de Ruedas de Puerto Rico (FEBASIRU), the local wheelchair basketball team. In this event, Mullin participated in a wheelchair basketball game for the first time with Max International Associate Héctor Marcano Lopez and the local Puerto Rican wheelchair basketball team (FEBASIRU). He participated in "Max and Mullin Legends Classic Exhibition Game" with 20 local Puerto Rican basketball legends.

== Career statistics ==
Legend
GP	Games played	GS	Games started	MPG	Minutes per game
FG%	Field goal percentage	3P%	3-point field goal percentage	FT%	Free throw percentage
RPG	Rebounds per game	APG	Assists per game	SPG	Steals per game
BPG	Blocks per game	PPG	Points per game	**Bold**	Career high
*	Led the league

=== NBA ===
==== Regular season ====
Year	Team	GP	GS	MPG	FG%	3P%	FT%	RPG	APG	SPG	BPG	PPG
1985–86	Golden State	55	30	25.3	.463	.185	.896	2.1	1.9	1.3	0.4	14.0
1986–87	Golden State	**82**	**82**	29.0	.514	.302	.825	2.2	3.2	1.2	0.4	15.1
1987–88	Golden State	60	55	33.9	.508	.351	.885	3.4	4.8	1.9	0.5	20.2
1988–89	Golden State	**82**	**82**	33.7	.509	.230	.892	**5.9**	**5.1**	**2.1**	0.5	**26.5**
1989–90	Golden State	78	78	36.3	.536	.372	.889	**5.9**	4.1	1.6	0.6	25.1
1990–91	Golden State	**82**	**82**	40.4*	.536	.301	.884	5.4	4.0	**2.1**	0.8	25.7
1991–92	Golden State	81	81	**41.3***	.524	.366	.833	5.6	3.5	**2.1**	0.8	25.6
1992–93	Golden State	46	46	**41.3**	.510	.451	.810	5.0	3.6	1.5	**0.9**	25.9
1993–94	Golden State	62	39	37.5	.472	.364	.753	5.6	**5.1**	1.7	**0.9**	16.8
1994–95	Golden State	25	23	35.6	.489	.452	.879	4.6	5.0	1.5	0.8	19.0
1995–96	Golden State	55	19	29.4	.499	.393	.856	2.9	3.5	1.4	0.6	13.3
1996–97	Golden State	79	63	34.6	**.553**	.411	.864	4.0	4.1	1.6	0.4	14.5
1997–98	Indiana	**82***	**82***	26.5	.481	.440	**.939***	3.0	2.3	1.2	0.5	11.3
1998–99	Indiana	50*	50*	23.6	.477	**.465**	.870	3.2	1.6	0.9	0.3	10.1
1999–00	Indiana	47	2	12.4	.428	.409	.902	1.6	0.8	0.6	0.2	5.1
2000–01	Golden State	20	8	18.7	.340	.365	.857	2.1	1.0	0.8	0.5	5.8
Career		986	822	32.6	.509	.384	.865	4.1	3.5	1.6	0.6	18.2
All-Star		4	2	19.5	.500	1.000	.875	2.0	2.0	1.0	0.3	8.3

==== Playoffs ====
Year	Team	GP	GS	MPG	FG%	3P%	FT%	RPG	APG	SPG	BPG	PPG
1987	Golden State	10	10	26.2	.500	**.750**	.750	1.5	2.3	0.9	0.2	11.3
1989	Golden State	8	8	42.6	.540	.125	.866	5.9	**4.5**	1.8	1.4	**29.4**
1991	Golden State	8	8	**45.8***	.527	.692	.860	**7.3**	2.9	**1.9**	1.5	23.8
1992	Golden State	4	4	42.0	.429	.333	**.929**	3.0	3.0	1.3	0.5	17.8
1994	Golden State	3	3	45.0	**.588**	.500	.909	4.7	3.7	0.0	**1.7**	25.3
1998	Indiana	**16**	**16**	25.8	.460	.385	.857	3.6	1.4	0.9	0.6	8.9
1999	Indiana	13	13	21.8	.410	.400	.870	1.5	1.2	0.8	0.2	9.5
2000	Indiana	9	1	10.0	.476	.250	.818	1.6	0.6	0.7	0.1	3.4
Career		71	63	29.0	.495	.409	.859	3.3	2.1	1.0	0.6	13.8

=== College ===
Year	Team	GP	GS	MPG	FG%	3P%	FT%	RPG	APG	SPG	BPG	PPG
1981–82	St. John's	30	30	35.4	.534	–	.791	3.2	3.1	1.4	.2	16.6
1982–83	St. John's	33	33	36.7	**.577**	–	.878	3.7	3.1	1.2	.2	19.1
1983–84	St. John's	27	27	**39.6**	.571	–	**.904**	4.4	4.0	**2.1**	.4	**22.9**
1984–85	St. John's	**35**	**35**	37.9	.521	–	.824	**4.8**	**4.3**	**2.1**	**.5**	19.8
Career		125	125	37.3	.550	–	.848	4.1	3.6	1.7	.3	19.5

== Head coaching record ==
Record table
Season	Team	Overall	Conference	Standing	Postseason
St. John's Red Storm (Big East Conference) (2015–2019)
2015–16	St. John's	8–24	1–17	10th	
2016–17	St. John's	14–19	7–11	8th	
2017–18	St. John's	16–17	4–14	T–9th	
2018–19	St. John's	21–13	8–10	7th	NCAA Division I First Four
St. John's:		59–73 (.447)	20–52 (.278)		
Total:		59–73 (.447)			

== Filmography ==
Year	Title	Role	Notes	Ref
2012	The Other Dream Team	Himself	Documentary about the Lithuania men's national basketball team at the 1992 Summer Olympics.	

== See also ==
- Bay Area Sports Hall of Fame
- List of National Basketball Association career steals leaders
- List of National Basketball Association career free throw percentage leaders
- List of National Basketball Association annual minutes leaders
