= Leo Rautins =

Canadian basketball player (born 1960)

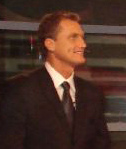
- Rautins in 2007

Personal information
- Born: March 20, 1960 (age 66) Toronto, Ontario, Canada
- Listed height: 6 ft 8 in (2.03 m)
- Listed weight: 215 lb (98 kg)

Career information
- High school: St. Michael's (Toronto, Ontario)
- College: Minnesota (1978–1979); Syracuse (1980–1983)
- NBA draft: 1983: 1st round, 17th overall pick
- Drafted by: Philadelphia 76ers
- Playing career: 1983–1993
- Position: Small forward
- Number: 11, 7

Career history
- 1983–1984: Philadelphia 76ers
- 1984: Atlanta Hawks
- 1985–1986: Virtus Banco di Roma
- 1986–1987: Citrosil Verona
- 1988–1989: La Crosse Catbirds
- 1989–1990: Pau-Orthez
- 1990–1991: Sioux Falls Skyforce
- 1991: Mayoral Málaga
- 1992: Coren Ourense
- 1992–1993: Lyon

Career highlights
- Third-team All-Big East (1983)

Career NBA statistics
- Points: 48 (1.5 ppg)
- Rebounds: 35 (1.1 rpg)
- Assists: 32 (1.0 apg)
- Stats at NBA.com
- Stats at Basketball Reference

Leo Rytis Rautins (born March 20, 1960) is a Canadian broadcaster, former professional basketball player and the former head coach of the Canadian men's national basketball team. Rautins played in the National Basketball Association (NBA) drafted in the first round of the 1983 NBA draft, by the Philadelphia 76ers. Rautins' NBA career was waylaid by injury. After a brief retirement, Rautins returned to basketball and played in European professional leagues from 1985 until 1992. He has been a broadcaster for the Toronto Raptors since the team's inception in 1995.

== Playing career ==
Rautins was a star in high school for Toronto's St. Michael's College School. In 1977, at age 16, he was named to the Canadian senior national team, the youngest player in the team's history to that time. He would be a member of the team until 1992. Rautins completed his national team playing career as Canada was eliminated in the 1992 Tournament of the Americas, the basketball qualifying tournament for the Barcelona Olympics.

Rautins attended the University of Minnesota for his freshman year of college, and Syracuse University for three seasons. At Minnesota, Rautins was named first-team All-Big Ten rookie, averaging 8.3 points, 4.1 rebounds, and 3.9 assists a game. He left Minnesota for multiple reasons: at Minnesota, he was not required to attend classes, and at Syracuse he would have the opportunity to be the top player. As a member of the Syracuse Orangemen, he averaged 12.1 points, 5.0 assists, and 6.2 rebounds. He is the first player ever to record a triple-double in Big East play, accomplishing the feat twice in the span of a month during his senior year. He was named All-Big East third team and Honorable Mention All-American that year.

In 1983, Rautins became the second Canadian ever drafted in the first round of the 1983 NBA draft. The 6 ft 8 in, 215 lb Rautins was selected 17th overall to the Philadelphia 76ers in the 1983 draft, considered an excellent passer. Unknown to Rautins, he reported to training camp with torn ligaments in his foot which was not treated properly and deteriorated during the season. Hampered by injuries, he played in 28 games as a rookie with the 76ers, averaging just seven minutes a game, 1.5 points, 1 assist, 1.2 rebounds, and 0.7 turnovers. In September 1984, he was traded to the Indiana Pacers for a third-round pick to make room for Charles Barkley under the salary cap but eventually signed as a free agent with the Atlanta Hawks. He played only four games for the Hawks, averaging a mere three minutes a contest and was waived in November 1984. Rautins tried out for other NBA teams and the Continental Basketball Association but was unable to find a spot with another team.

Rautins then left the NBA, returned to Syracuse and did radio and television work. He was a commentator for the Canadian Broadcasting Corporation (CBC) at the 1984 Olympics. In 1985, Rautins returned to playing basketball, moving to Europe. Rautins played in Italy for Serie A1 team Banco Roma (1985–1986) and Serie A2 team Citrosil Verona (1986–1987), in France with Pau Orthez (1989–90 and 1992), and in Spain (1991–92). Rautins then retired from playing. By this time, he had undergone a total of 14 knee operations.

== Post-playing career ==
After retiring from playing, Rautins became a basketball commentator, most notably with the Toronto Raptors since their inaugural season in 1995, serving as either their lead colour commentator (for games on Sportsnet) or studio analyst (for games on TSN). He also conducts basketball camps in the summer.

In 1997, Rautins was inducted into the Canada Basketball Hall of Fame.

In 2000, Rautins was inducted into the Ontario Basketball Hall of Fame.

In February 2005, Rautins was named head coach of the Canadian national team. The team did not qualify for the 2008 Olympics, but did qualify for the 2010 World Championship. He resigned from that position in September 2011, after Canada lost to Panama in the FIBA Americas tournament.

In 2014, Rautins became involved in plans to launch a new Canadian basketball league. He was named as one of the principals in a proposed Ottawa professional team after the failure of the Ottawa SkyHawks minor professional team. Rautins had been in consideration for the Commissioner position of the National Basketball League of Canada.

On October 17, 2016, Rautins was inducted into the Ontario Sports Hall of Fame at the Sheraton Centre Toronto Hotel.

== Personal life ==
Rautins was born in Toronto, Ontario to a Latvian father and Lithuanian mother. His parents met in a prison camp, from which they escaped with the help of Dutch soldiers, before emigrating to Canada, as it was the only country that would accept them. As a youth, he played for Toronto Aušra, a local sports club for children of Lithuanian descent. Rautins and his first wife Maria had four sons: Michael, Andrew (Andy), Jay and Sammy. Andy followed in his father's footsteps, playing for Syracuse and being drafted by the New York Knicks in 2010. Rautins married Jamie Lawson in 2005. During the NBA offseason, Rautins resides in Jupiter, Florida.

== Career statistics ==
Legend
GP	Games played	GS	Games started	MPG	Minutes per game
FG%	Field goal percentage	3P%	3-point field goal percentage	FT%	Free throw percentage
RPG	Rebounds per game	APG	Assists per game	SPG	Steals per game
BPG	Blocks per game	PPG	Points per game	**Bold**	Career high

=== NBA ===
==== Regular season ====
Year	Team	GP	GS	MPG	FG%	3P%	FT%	RPG	APG	SPG	BPG	PPG
1983–84	Philadelphia	**28**	**3**	**7.0**	**.362**	—	**.600**	**1.2**	**1.0**	**.3**	**.1**	**1.7**
1984–85	Atlanta	4	0	3.0	.000	—	—	.5	.8	.0	.0	.0
Career		32	3	6.5	.350	—	.600	1.1	1.0	.3	.1	1.5

==== Playoffs ====
Year	Team	GP	GS	MPG	FG%	3P%	FT%	RPG	APG	SPG	BPG	PPG
1984	Philadelphia	3	—	1.7	.333	.500	—	.7	.3	.3	.0	1.0

== Awards ==
- 1978 – All-Big Ten Rookie Team
- All-Star – Italian, French and Spanish professional leagues
- 1997 – Canada's Basketball Hall of Fame
- 2000 – Ontario Basketball Hall of Fame
- 2000 – Syracuse University All-Century team
