= Dominic Pressley =

American basketball player

Personal information
- Born: May 30, 1964 Washington, D.C., U.S.
- Died: December 28, 1997 (aged 33)
- Listed height: 6 ft 2 in (1.88 m)
- Listed weight: 170 lb (77 kg)

Career information
- High school: Mackin (Washington, D.C.)
- College: Boston College (1982–1986)
- NBA draft: 1986: 5th round, 99th overall pick
- Drafted by: Seattle SuperSonics
- Playing career: 1986–1991
- Position: Point guard
- Number: 3, 12

Career history
- 1986–1987: Albany Patroons
- 1987: Savannah Spirits
- 1988: Washington Bullets
- 1989: Albany Patroons
- 1989: Chicago Bulls
- 1989: Rockford Lightning
- 1989–1990: Grand Rapids Hoops
- 1990: San Jose Jammers
- 1990: Tulsa Fast Breakers
- 1990–1991: La Crosse Catbirds
- Stats at NBA.com
- Stats at Basketball Reference

Dominic Ivan Pressley (May 30, 1964 – December 28, 1997) was an American professional basketball player. He was a point guard who played one season in the National Basketball Association (NBA) as a member of the Washington Bullets and the Chicago Bulls (1988–89). He was selected by the Seattle SuperSonics in the fifth round of the 1986 NBA draft but he was released before playing for them.

Pressley was a childhood friend of Len Bias and started playing basketball together when they were aged 12. Both were recruited to play college basketball for the Maryland Terrapins but Pressley chose to join the Boston College Eagles. He played for the Eagles from 1982 to 1986 and was known for his defensive abilities. Pressley was inducted into the Boston College Varsity Club Athletic Hall of Fame in 2003.

Pressley died of cancer in 1997.

== Career playing statistics ==
Legend
GP	Games played	GS	Games started	MPG	Minutes per game
FG%	Field goal percentage	3P%	3-point field goal percentage	FT%	Free throw percentage
RPG	Rebounds per game	APG	Assists per game	SPG	Steals per game
BPG	Blocks per game	PPG	Points per game	**Bold**	Career high

=== NBA ===
==== Regular season ====
Year	Team	GP	GS	MPG	FG%	3P%	FT%	RPG	APG	SPG	BPG	PPG
1988–89	Washington	**10**	0	**10.7**	**.320**	–	**.556**	**1.4**	**2.2**	**.4**	.0	**2.1**
1988–89	Chicago	3	0	5.7	.167	.000	–	.3	1.3	.0	.0	.7
Career		13	0	9.5	.290	.000	.556	1.2	2.0	.3	.0	1.8
