= Stewart Granger (basketball) =

Canadian basketball player (born 1961)

Personal information
- Born: October 27, 1961 (age 65) Montreal, Quebec, Canada
- Listed height: 6 ft 3 in (1.91 m)
- Listed weight: 190 lb (86 kg)

Career information
- High school: Nazareth Regional (Brooklyn, New York)
- College: Villanova (1979–1983)
- NBA draft: 1983: 1st round, 24th overall pick
- Drafted by: Cleveland Cavaliers
- Playing career: 1984–1990
- Position: Point guard
- Number: 10, 20, 11

Career history
- 1983–1984: Cleveland Cavaliers
- 1984–1985: Sarasota Stingers
- 1985: Atlanta Hawks
- 1985: Sarasota Stingers
- 1985–1986: Maine Windjammers
- 1986: Wildwood Aces
- 1986–1987: New York Knicks
- 1987: Philadelphia Aces
- 1988: Long Island Knights
- 1989–1990: Alviks BK

Career highlights
- 2× AP Honorable mention All-American (1982, 1983); 2× Second-team All-Big East (1982, 1983); Third-team All-Big East (1981)
- Stats at NBA.com
- Stats at Basketball Reference

Stewart Francis Granger (born October 27, 1961) is a Canadian former National Basketball Association (NBA) player and Canadian national team member.

Though in his early years Granger grew up in Montreal, his high school years were spent attending and playing basketball at Nazareth Regional High School in Brooklyn, New York, USA. Granger won the New York State high school finals in 1979 playing for NYC-Nazareth. Granger played college basketball at Villanova University, where his career averages were 10.4 points per game and 4.8 assists per game.

In the 1983 NBA draft, Granger was selected by the Cleveland Cavaliers at the 24th overall pick.

In 1984, his first season, Granger played with the team that drafted him, the Cleveland Cavaliers, an average 4.5 points per game and 2.4 assists per game. In his second season, he played for the Atlanta Hawks, where he averaged 1.8 points per game, and 1.3 assists per game. Then in his final NBA season, which was in 1987 with the New York Knicks, he averaged 3.3 points per game and 1.8 assists per game.

Granger was also a first team USBL All-Star in 1986 while a member of the Wildwood Aces. He also had a career in the Philippine Basketball Association.

== Career statistics ==
Legend
GP	Games played	GS	Games started	MPG	Minutes per game
FG%	Field goal percentage	3P%	3-point field goal percentage	FT%	Free throw percentage
RPG	Rebounds per game	APG	Assists per game	SPG	Steals per game
BPG	Blocks per game	PPG	Points per game	**Bold**	Career high

=== NBA ===
==== Regular season ====
Year	Team	GP	GS	MPG	FG%	3P%	FT%	RPG	APG	SPG	BPG	PPG
1983–84	Cleveland	**56**	**13**	**13.2**	**.429**	**.308**	.757	1.0	**2.4**	.4	.0	**4.5**
1984–85	Atlanta	9	1	10.2	.353	.000	.500	.7	1.3	.2	.0	1.8
1986–87	New York	15	0	11.1	.370	.000	**.818**	**1.1**	1.8	**.5**	**.1**	3.3
Career		80	14	12.5	.414	.235	.742	1.0	2.2	.4	.0	4.0

== See also ==
- List of Montreal athletes
- List of famous Montrealers
