= Jay Murphy =

American basketball player (born 1962)

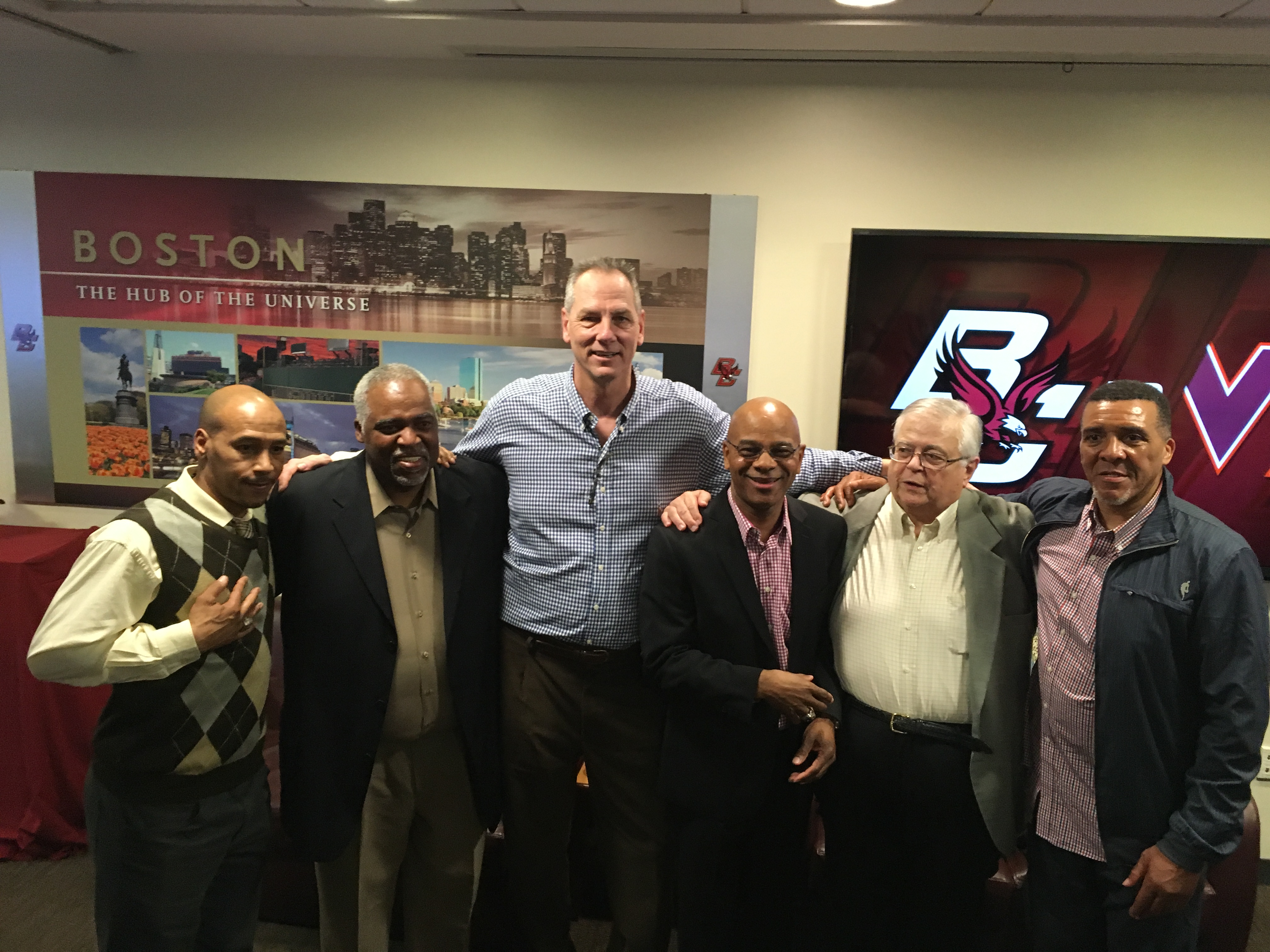
- Murphy (third from the left)

Personal information
- Born: June 26, 1962 (age 64) Meriden, Connecticut, U.S.
- Listed height: 6 ft 9 in (2.06 m)
- Listed weight: 220 lb (100 kg)

Career information
- High school: Francis T Maloney (Meriden, Connecticut)
- College: Boston College (1980–1984)
- NBA draft: 1984: 2nd round, 31st overall pick
- Drafted by: Golden State Warriors
- Playing career: 1984–1995
- Position: Power forward
- Number: 46, 42

Career history
- 1984–1985: Los Angeles Clippers
- 1985–1986: Springfield Fame
- 1986–1988: Washington Bullets
- 1989–1990: Paris Basket Racing
- 1990–1991: ASVEL Lyon-Villeurbanne
- 1991–1995: Fabriano

Career highlights
- First-team All-Big East (1984); Second-team All-Big East (1983)
- Stats at NBA.com
- Stats at Basketball Reference

Jay Dennis Murphy (born June 26, 1962) is an American former professional basketball player. He played four seasons in the National Basketball Association (NBA) for the Los Angeles Clippers and Washington Bullets.

== College career ==
He attended high school at Francis T Maloney High School in Meriden, Connecticut. A 6'9" and 220 lbs. power forward, Murphy played for coaches Tom Davis and Gary Williams at Boston College (BC) in Chestnut Hill, Massachusetts. He averaged 14.6 points per game in his four-year career. Murphy was a key reason why BC enjoyed success in the early 1980s, leading the Eagles to three NCAA Tournaments – two Sweet 16s and one Elite Eight – and one National Invitation Tournament (NIT) in his four seasons (1980 to 1984). He was a three-time All-Big East honoree, earning first-team honors as a senior. He ranks sixth on the school's career scoring list (1,795 points) and seventh on the career rebounding list (763 rebounds).

== Professional career ==
Murphy was selected in the second round (31st pick overall) of the 1984 NBA draft by the Golden State Warriors. He did not play a game with the Warriors as he was immediately traded to the Los Angeles Clippers for center Jerome Whitehead. On December 17, 1985, he was waived by the Clippers. On September 3, 1986, he was signed as a free agent with the Washington Bullets. His final season in the NBA was the 1987–88 season, during his time with the Bullets. He scored a total of 160 points in his four-year, 67-game NBA career. Murphy also played in the United States Basketball League (USBL) for the Springfield Fame (1985–86) as well as in France and Italy before retiring in 1995.

== Career statistics ==
Legend
GP	Games played	GS	Games started	MPG	Minutes per game
FG%	Field goal percentage	3P%	3-point field goal percentage	FT%	Free throw percentage
RPG	Rebounds per game	APG	Assists per game	SPG	Steals per game
BPG	Blocks per game	PPG	Points per game	**Bold**	Career high

=== NBA ===
==== Regular season ====
Year	Team	GP	GS	MPG	FG%	3P%	FT%	RPG	APG	SPG	BPG	PPG
1984–85	L.A. Clippers	**23**	0	6.5	.160	.000	.741	1.8	.2	.0	.1	1.2
1985–86	L.A. Clippers	14	0	**7.1**	.356	.000	.571	1.1	.2	**.3**	**.2**	2.9
1986–87	Washington	21	0	6.7	**.431**	—	.563	**1.9**	**.3**	.1	.1	**3.4**
1987–88	Washington	9	0	5.1	.348	—	**.800**	1.8	.1	.1	.0	2.2
Career		67	0	6.5	.332	.000	.607	1.7	.2	.1	.1	2.4

== Personal life and legacy ==
Murphy was inducted into the Boston College Varsity Club Athletic Hall of Fame in 1999. His son Erik played basketball at the University of Florida, and was drafted by the Chicago Bulls in the second round of the 2013 NBA draft. Murphy's son Alex played at Duke University, the University of Florida and Northeastern University. Both sons have dual citizenship due to their Finnish mother Päivi, and Erik Murphy played for the Finnish national team at the 2014 FIBA Basketball World Cup in Spain. He also has another son, Tomas, who was named to the Colonial Athletic Association 2017-2018 All-Rookie Team after his freshman season with Northeastern.
