= John Garris (basketball) =

American basketball player

Personal information
- Born: June 6, 1959 (age 67) Bridgeport, Connecticut, U.S.
- Listed height: 6 ft 8 in (2.03 m)
- Listed weight: 205 lb (93 kg)

Career information
- High school: Bassick (Bridgeport, Connecticut)
- College: Michigan (1978–1980); Boston College (1981–1983)
- NBA draft: 1983: 2nd round, 27th overall pick
- Drafted by: Cleveland Cavaliers
- Playing career: 1983–1993
- Position: Power forward
- Number: 55

Career history
- 1983–1984: Cleveland Cavaliers
- 1984–1985: Zaragoza
- 1985–1986: Bay State Bombardiers
- 1986: Maine Windjammers
- 1986: Springfield Fame
- 1986–1987: Topeka Sizzlers
- 1991–1992: Basket CRO Lyon
- 1992–1993: Mulhouse
- Stats at NBA.com
- Stats at Basketball Reference

John Brasker Garris (born June 6, 1959) is an American former professional basketball player. He was a 6-foot-8-inch (203 cm), 205-pound (93 kg) power forward.

Garris played collegiately for Boston College and was selected by the National Basketball Association's Cleveland Cavaliers in the third pick of the second round of the 1983 NBA draft. He played in 33 regular season games for the Cavaliers in the 1983–84 season.

== Career statistics ==
Legend
GP	Games played	GS	Games started	MPG	Minutes per game
FG%	Field goal percentage	3P%	3-point field goal percentage	FT%	Free throw percentage
RPG	Rebounds per game	APG	Assists per game	SPG	Steals per game
BPG	Blocks per game	PPG	Points per game	**Bold**	Career high

=== NBA ===
==== Regular season ====
Year	Team	GP	GS	MPG	FG%	3P%	FT%	RPG	APG	SPG	BPG	PPG
1983–84	Cleveland	33	1	8.1	.510	–	.794	2.3	.3	.2	.2	4.0
