= 1983–84 Big East Conference men's basketball season =

American college basketball season

1983–84 Big East Conference Men's Basketball Season
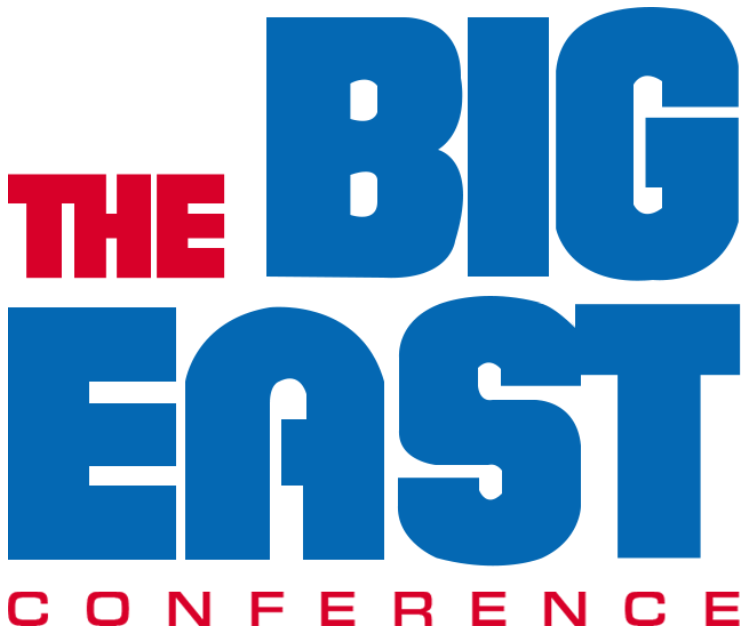
- League: NCAA Division I
- Sport: Basketball
- Duration: November 25, 1983 through March 10, 1984
- Teams: 9
- TV partner: ESPN

Regular Season
- Champion: Georgetown (14–2)
- Season MVP: Patrick Ewing – Georgetown

Tournament
- Champions: Georgetown
- Finals MVP: Patrick Ewing – Georgetown

Basketball seasons
- 1982–83 1984–85

1983–84 Big East men's basketball standings
	Conf.				Overall
Team	W		L	PCT	W		L	PCT
No. 2 Georgetown†	14	–	2	.875	34	–	3	.919
No. 18 Syracuse	12	–	4	.750	23	–	9	.719
Villanova	12	–	4	.750	19	–	12	.613
Boston College	8	–	8	.500	18	–	12	.600
St. John's	8	–	8	.500	18	–	12	.600
Pittsburgh	6	–	10	.375	18	–	13	.581
Connecticut	5	–	11	.313	13	–	15	.464
Providence	5	–	11	.313	15	–	14	.517
Seton Hall	2	–	14	.125	9	–	19	.321
† 1984 Big East tournament winner As of April 2, 1984; Rankings from AP Poll

The 1983–84 Big East Conference men's basketball season was the fifth in conference history, and involved its nine full-time member schools.

Georgetown won its second regular season championship with a 14–2 record. Georgetown also won its second Big East tournament championship and went on to win the national championship.

== Season summary & highlights ==
- Georgetown won its third regular season championship with a 14–2 record.
- Georgetown also won its second Big East tournament championship.
- Georgetown reached the national championship game for the third time in school history and second time in three years and defeated Houston to win its first national championship.
- Georgetown junior center Patrick Ewing was named the NCAA Tournament's Most Outstanding Player.
- Georgetown finished the season ranked No. 2 and set a new school record for victories in a season with 34 wins.

== Head coaches ==
School	Coach	Season	Notes
Boston College	Gary Williams	2nd	
Connecticut	Dom Perno	7th	
Georgetown	John Thompson Jr.	12th	
Pittsburgh	Roy Chipman	4th	
Providence	Joe Mullaney	17th	
St. John's	Lou Carnesecca	16th	
Seton Hall	P. J. Carlesimo	2nd	
Syracuse	Jim Boeheim	8th	Big East Coach of the Year
Villanova	Rollie Massimino	11th	

== Rankings ==
Georgetown was ranked No. 6 or higher in the Top 20 of the Associated Press poll for the entire season. and Georgetown was ranked in all but one weekly poll. Boston College, St. John's, and Syracuse also were ranked in the Top 20 during the season.

1983–84 Big East Conference Weekly Rankings Key: ██ Increase in ranking. ██ Decrease in ranking.
AP Poll	Pre	11/28	12/5	12/12	12/19	12/26	1/2	1/9	1/16	1/23	1/30	2/6	2/13	2/20	2/27	3/5	Final
Boston College	15	15	12	8	6	12	17	18	16								
Connecticut																	
Georgetown	4	3	3	5	5	5	4	4	6	4	4	3	2	2	4	2	2
Pittsburgh																	
Providence																	
St. John's		19	16	13	12	8	13	10	14								
Seton Hall																	
Syracuse										20	13	19	16	16	16		18
Villanova																	

== Regular-season statistical leaders ==
Scoring
Name	School	PPG
Chris Mullin	SJU	22.1
Clyde Vaughan	Pitt	20.3
Jay Murphy	BC	19.8
Rafael Addison	Syr	17.7
Michael Adams	BC	17.3

Rebounding
Name	School	RPG
Otis Thorpe	Prov	10.3
Patrick Ewing	GU	10.0
Clyde Vaughan	Pitt	8.3
Ed Pinckney	Vill	7.9
Tim Coles	Conn	7.9

Assists
Name	School	APG
Mike Jones	SHU	6.6
Karl Hobbs	Conn	6.4
Pearl Washington	Syr	6.2
Bill Culbertson	Pitt	5.5
Gary McLain	Vill	5.3

Steals
Name	School	SPG
Michael Adams	BC	2.9
Pearl Washington	Syr	2.4
Bill Culbertson	Pitt	2.2
Chris Mullin	SJU	2.1
Harold Pressley	Vill	1.9

Blocks
Name	School	BPG
Patrick Ewing	GU	3.2
Ed Pinckney	Vill	1.9
Keith Armstrong	Pitt	1.8
Otis Thorpe	Prov	1.5
Ray Knight	Prov	1.3

Field Goals
Name	School	FG%
Patrick Ewing	GU	.658
Ed Pinckney	Vill	.604
Dwayne McClain	Vill	.591
Otis Thorpe	Prov	.580
Chris Mullin	SJU	.571

Free Throws
Name	School	FT%
Chris Mullin	SJU	.904
Rafael Addison	Syr	.836
Michael Jackson	GU	.816
Frank Dobbs	Vill	.808
Jay Murphy	BC	.800

== Postseason ==
=== Big East tournament ===
==== Seeding ====
Seeding in the Big East tournament was based on conference record, with tiebreakers applied as necessary. The eighth- and ninth-seeded teams played a first-round game, and the other seven teams received a bye into the quarterfinals.

The tournament's seeding was as follows: (1) Georgetown, (2) Syracuse, (3) Villanova, (4) Boston College, (5) St. John's, (6) Pittsburgh, (7) Connecticut, (8) Providence, (9) Seton Hall.

== Bracket ==
First round March 8, 1984
8	Providence	59
9	Seton Hall	55

Quarterfinals; March 9, 1984
1	#2 Georgetown	70
8	Providence	50
4	Boston College	56
5	St. John's	57
2	Syracuse	73
7	Connecticut	58
3	Villanova	75
6	Pittsburgh	65

Semifinals; March 10, 1984
1	#2 Georgetown	79
5	St. John's	68
2	Syracuse	66
3	Villanova	65

Championship Game; March 11, 1984
1	#2 Georgetown	82^{OT}
2	Syracuse	71

=== NCAA tournament ===
Four Big East teams received bids to the NCAA Tournament, with Georgetown seeded No. 1 in the West Region. Georgetown played in the championship game for the second time in three seasons and defeated Houston to win the first national championship in school history. St. John's lost in the first round, Villanova in the second round, and Syracuse in the East Region semifinal. Georgetown junior center Patrick Ewing was named the tournament's Most Outstanding Player.

School	Region	Seed	Round 1	Round 2	Sweet 16	Elite 8	Final 4	Final
Georgetown	West	1	Bye	9 SMU, W 37–36	5 UNLV, W 62–48	10 Dayton, W 61–49	ME1 Kentucky, W 53–40	MW2 Houston, W 84–75
Syracuse	East	3	Bye	6 VCU, W 78–63	1 Virginia, L 63–55			
Villanova	Mideast	7	10 Marshall, W 84–72	2 Illinois, L 64–56				
St. John's	East	9	8 Temple, L 65–63					

=== National Invitation Tournament ===
Two Big East teams received bids to the National Invitation Tournament, which did not yet have seeding. Playing in the same unnamed bracket, Boston College and Pittsburgh both lost to Notre Dame, Boston College in the second round and Pittsburgh in the quarterfinals.

School	Round 1	Round 2	Quarterfinals
Pittsburgh	La Salle, W 95–91	Florida State, W 66–63	Notre Dame, L 72–64
Boston College	Saint Joseph's, W 75–63	Notre Dame, L 66–52	

== Awards and honors ==
=== Big East Conference ===
Co-Players of the Year:

- Patrick Ewing, Georgetown, C Jr.
- Chris Mullin, St. John's, F Jr.

Defensive Player of the Year:

- Patrick Ewing, Georgetown, C Jr.

Freshman of the Year:

- Pearl Washington, Syracuse, G

Coach of the Year:

- Jim Boeheim, Syracuse (8th season)

All-Big East First Team

- Jay Murphy, St. John's, F Sr., 6 ft 9 in (206 cm), 220 lb (100 kg), Meriden, Conn.
- Patrick Ewing, Georgetown, C Jr., 7 ft 0 in (213 cm), 240 lb (109 kg), Cambridge, Mass.
- Chris Mullin, St. John's, F Jr., 6 ft 6 in (198 cm), 205 lb (93 kg), Brooklyn, N.Y.
- Otis Thorpe, Providence, F Sr., 6 ft 10 in (208 cm), 248 lb (112 kg), Boynton Beach, Fla.
- Pearl Washington, Syracuse, G, Fr., 6 ft 2 in (188 cm), 190 lb (86 kg), Brooklyn, N.Y.

All-Big East Second Team:

- Michael Adams, Boston College, G Jr., 5 ft 10 in (178 cm), 165 lb (75 kg), Hartford, Conn.
- David Wingate, Georgetown, G, So., 6 ft 5 in (196 cm), 185 lb (84 kg), Baltimore, Md.
- Clyde Vaughan, Pittsburgh, F Sr., 6 ft 4 in (193 cm), 210 lb (95 kg), Mount Vernon, N.Y.
- Rafael Addison, Syracuse, F, So., 6 ft 7 in (201 cm), 215 lb (98 kg), Jersey City, N.J.
- Ed Pinckney, Villanova, F Jr., 6 ft 9 in (206 cm), 205 lb (93 kg), The Bronx, N.Y.

All-Big East Third Team:

- Karl Hobbs, Connecticut, G Sr., 5 ft 8 in (173 cm), 160 lb (73 kg), Roxbury, Mass.
- Michael Jackson, Georgetown, G, So., 6 ft 2 in (188 cm), 183 lb (83 kg), Fairfax, Va.
- Andre McCloud, Seton Hall, F, So., 6 ft 6 in (198 cm), 210 lb (95 kg), Washington, D.C.
- Bill Wennington, St. John's, C Jr., 7 ft 0 in (213 cm), 245 lb (111 kg), Montreal, Quebec, Canada
- Dwayne McClain, Villanova, G Jr., 6 ft 6 in (198 cm), 185 lb (84 kg), Worcester, Mass.
- Harold Pressley, Villanova, F, So., 6 ft 7 in (201 cm), 210 lb (95 kg), The Bronx, N.Y.

Big East All-Freshman Team:

- Michael Graham, Georgetown, F, Fr., 6 ft 9 in (206 cm), 270 lb (122 kg), Washington, D.C.
- Reggie Williams, Georgetown, F, Fr., 6 ft 7 in (201 cm), 190 lb (86 kg), Baltimore, Md.
- Mark Jackson, St. John's, G, Fr., 6 ft 3 in (191 cm), 195 lb (88 kg), Queens, N.Y.
- Willie Glass, St. John's, F, Fr., 6 ft 5 in (196 cm), 205 lb (93 kg), Atlantic City, N.J.
- Pearl Washington, Syracuse, G, Fr., 6 ft 2 in (188 cm), 190 lb (86 kg), Brooklyn, N.Y.

=== All-Americans ===
The following players were selected to the 1984 Associated Press All-America teams.

Consensus All-America First Team:

- Patrick Ewing, Georgetown, Key Stats: 16.4 ppg, 10.0 rpg, 3.6 bpg, 65.8 FG%, 608 points

Consensus All-America Second Team:

- Chris Mullin, St. John's, Key Stats: 22.9 ppg, 4.4 rpg, 4.0 apg, 57.1 FG%, 619 points

First Team All-America:

- Patrick Ewing, Georgetown, Key Stats: 16.4 ppg, 10.0 rpg, 3.6 bpg, 65.8 FG%, 608 points

Second Team All-America:

- Chris Mullin, St. John's, Key Stats: 22.9 ppg, 4.4 rpg, 4.0 apg, 57.1 FG%, 619 points

AP Honorable Mention

- Jay Murphy, Boston College
- Otis Thorpe, Providence
- Clyde Vaughan, Pittsburgh
- Pearl Washington, Syracuse

== See also ==
- 1983–84 NCAA Division I men's basketball season
- 1983–84 Connecticut Huskies men's basketball team
- 1983–84 Georgetown Hoyas men's basketball team
- 1983–84 Pittsburgh Panthers men's basketball team
- 1983–84 St. John's Redmen basketball team
- 1983–84 Syracuse Orangemen basketball team
- 1983–84 Villanova Wildcats men's basketball team
