= 1984 NCAA Division I men's basketball championship game =

American college basketball final

1984 NCAA Tournament Championship Game
National championship game
| Houston Cougars | Georgetown Hoyas |
| SWC | Big East |
| (32–4) | (33–3) |
|---|---|
| 75 | 84 |
| Head coach: Guy Lewis | Head coach: John Thompson, Jr. |
- AP: 5
- Coaches: 5
- AP: 2
- Coaches: 2
| | 1st half | 2nd half | Total |
|---|---|---|---|
| Houston Cougars | 30 | 45 | 75 |
| Georgetown Hoyas | 40 | 44 | 84 |
- Date: April 2, 1984
- Venue: Kingdome, Seattle, Washington
- MVP: Patrick Ewing, Georgetown
- Favorite: Georgetown
- Attendance: 38,471

United States TV coverage
- Network: CBS
- Announcers: Gary Bender (play-by-play); Billy Packer (color)

The 1984 NCAA Division I men's basketball championship game was the finals of the 1984 NCAA Division I men's basketball tournament and it determined the national champion for the 1983-84 NCAA Division I men's basketball season The game was played on April 2, 1984, at the Kingdome in Seattle, Washington, and featured the West Regional Champion, #1-seeded Georgetown and the Midwest Regional Champion, #2-seeded Houston.

This was the last championship game to ever feature a team from the Southwest Conference, which disbanded in 1996.

== Background ==
Georgetown reached the Final Four for the third time in school history and second time in three years to face Kentucky, a team which had never lost a national semifinal game and was led by the "Twin Towers," Sam Bowie and Melvin Turpin. Bowie and Turpin managed to get Ewing into foul trouble early, and with him on the bench and Reggie Williams shooting only 1-for-7 (14.3%) from the field during the game, the Wildcats raced out to a 27–15 lead with 3:06 left in the first half. After that however, the Hoyas made a defensive stand still unequalled in college basketball: Kentucky scored only two more points in the first half; the Wildcats also did not score in the first 9 minutes 55 seconds of the second half, missing their first 12 shots and after that shooting 3-for-21 (14.3%) during the remainder of the game. Overall, Kentucky shot 3-for-33 (9.1 percent) from the field during the second half. Although he played for only 17 minutes and suffered a season-ending foot injury in the second half, Gene Smith had one of the best defensive games of his career. Bowie and Turpin finished the game a combined 0-for-12, Wingate scored 12 points and held Kentucky's Jim Master to 2-for-7 (28.6%) shooting from the field, Michael Jackson scored 12 points and pulled down a career-high 10 rebounds, and Georgetown won 53–40 to advance to the national final for the third time in school history and second time in three years.

Meanwhile, Houston was making its second straight national title game appearance after North Carolina State had famously upset them in Albuquerque in 1983. Clyde Drexler had declared for the NBA Draft after that season, but Akeem Olajuwon remained on the roster.

== Game summary ==
Reggie Williams demonstrated his true potential for the first time in the national championship game, putting in a strong defensive performance and shooting 9-for-18 (50.0%) from the field with 19 points and seven rebounds in the game, while Wingate scored 16 points and Ewing managed 10 points and nine rebounds. Jackson scored 11 points and had six assists, two of which set up Ewing and Graham 14 points and six rebounds for decisive slam dunks baskets late in the game. The game was decided well before the final whistle, and the Hoyas won the school's first national championship 84–75.

Late in the game, with Georgetown enjoying a comfortable lead, Thompson began to pull starters out and give bench players some time on the court; the game's enduring image came when senior guard Fred Brown came out of the game. Two years earlier at the same stage in New Orleans against North Carolina, after Michael Jordan had given the Tar Heels the lead, Brown had mistakenly passed the ball to James Worthy with less than 15 seconds to go, ruining Georgetown's chances for a final game-winning shot and allowing North Carolina to take the national championship, and cameras had captured Thompson consoling a devastated Brown with a hug as the Tar Heels celebrated. As Brown left the 1984 championship game, cameras caught Brown and Thompson again embracing on the sideline, this time to celebrate a victory.

== Aftermath ==
Olajuwon declared for the NBA Draft after the game and remained in Houston as he was selected #1 overall by the Rockets ahead of Sam Bowie at #2 by the Portland Trail Blazers and Michael Jordan at #3 by the Chicago Bulls. Ewing returned for his senior season and helped lead Georgetown back to the national championship game, but the Hoyas were upset by conference rival Villanova.

Ten years after the game, Olajuwon and Ewing faced each other in the 1994 NBA Finals between the Rockets and the New York Knicks, which the Rockets won in seven games to win the first of two consecutive NBA championships. Houston would not return to the Final Four until 2021, and would not return to the national championship game until 2025, as a member of the Big 12 Conference, where they would lose to Florida after leading by as many as twelve points.

== Participating teams ==
=== Houston Cougars ===
- Midwest
  - (2) Houston 77, (10) Louisiana Tech 69
  - (2) Houston 78, (6) Memphis 71
  - (2) Houston 68, (4) Wake Forest 63
- Final Four
  - (MW2) Houston 49, (E7) Virginia 47 (OT)

=== Georgetown Hoyas ===
- West
  - (1) Georgetown 37, (9) SMU 36
  - (1) Georgetown 62, (5) UNLV 48
  - (1) Georgetown 61, (10) Dayton 49
- Final Four
  - (W1) Georgetown 53, (ME1) Kentucky 40

== Box score ==
CBS

April 2

Box Score

#MW2 Houston Cougars 75, #W1 Georgetown Hoyas 84
Scoring by half: 30–40, 45–44
| Pts: Alvin Franklin 21; Rebs: Hakeem Olajuwon 9 Asts: Alvin Franklin 9 | Pts: Reggie Williams 19; Rebs: Patrick Ewing 9 Asts: Michael Jackson 6 |

Kingdome, Seattle, Washington
Attendance: 38,471

| Starters: | | | Pts | Reb | Ast |
|---|---|---|---|---|---|
| F | 42 | Michael Young | 18 | 5 | 1 |
| F | 40 | Rickie Winslow | 2 | 6 | 3 |
| G/F | 44 | Reid Gettys | 6 | 1 | 7 |
| G | 20 | Alvin Franklin | 21 | 2 | 9 |
| C | 35 | Hakeem Olajuwon | 15 | 9 | 0 |
| Reserves: | | | | | |
| G/F | 32 | Benny Anders | 4 | 0 | 0 |
| G | 14 | Eric Dickens | 5 | 0 | 0 |
| F/C | 54 | Greg Anderson | 2 | 2 | 0 |
| G | 10 | Derek Giles | 0 | 0 | 0 |
| G | 12 | Renaldo Thomas | 0 | 0 | 0 |
| F | 30 | Gary Orsak | 2 | 0 | 0 |
| G/F | 22 | Marvin Alexander | 0 | 1 | 0 |
| F | 50 | Stacey Belcher | 0 | 0 | 0 |
| F | 52 | Braxton Clark | 0 | 0 | 0 |
| G | 24 | Jamie Weaver | 0 | 0 | 0 |
Head coach:
Guy Lewis

| Houston | Georgetown |

| Houston | Statistics | Georgetown |
|---|---|---|
| 31/56 (55%) | Field goals | 34/60 (57%) |
| 13/22 (59%) | Free throws | 16/22 (73%) |
| 26 | Total rebounds | 30 |
| 20 | Assists | 19 |
| 13 | Turnovers | 9 |
| 3 | Steals | 0 |
| 4 | Blocks | 6 |
| 21 | Fouls | 25 |

| Starters: | | | Pts | Reb | Ast |
|---|---|---|---|---|---|
| G/F | 40 | David Wingate | 16 | 1 | 3 |
| F/C | 52 | Ralph Dalton | 0 | 2 | 0 |
| G | 30 | Michael Jackson | 11 | 0 | 6 |
| G | 20 | Fred Brown | 4 | 4 | 4 |
| C | 33 | Patrick Ewing | 10 | 9 | 3 |
| Reserves: | | | | | |
| G/F | 34 | Reggie Williams | 19 | 7 | 3 |
| F | 50 | Michael Graham | 14 | 5 | 0 |
| F | 24 | Bill Martin | 6 | 2 | 0 |
| G | 32 | Horace Broadnax | 4 | 0 | 0 |
| F | 55 | Victor Morris | 0 | 0 | 0 |
Head coach:
John Thompson
