= 1983–84 Georgetown Hoyas men's basketball team =

American college basketball season

1983–84 Georgetown Hoyas men's basketball

NCAA tournament National champions Big East tournament champions Big East regular season champions Las Vegas Classic Champions

National Championship Game, W 84–75 vs. Houston
- Conference: Big East Conference

Ranking
- Coaches: No. 2
- AP: No. 2
- Record: 34–3 (14–2 Big East)
- Head coach: John Thompson (12th season)
- Assistant coaches: Craig Esherick (2nd season); Mike Riley (2nd season)
- Captain: Gene Smith
- Home arena: Capital Centre

1983–84 Big East men's basketball standings
| | Conf. | | | | Overall |
| Team | W | | L | PCT | W | | L | PCT |
|---|---|---|---|---|---|---|---|---|
| No. 2 Georgetown† | 14 | – | 2 | .875 | 34 | – | 3 | .919 |
| No. 18 Syracuse | 12 | – | 4 | .750 | 23 | – | 9 | .719 |
| Villanova | 12 | – | 4 | .750 | 19 | – | 12 | .613 |
| Boston College | 8 | – | 8 | .500 | 18 | – | 12 | .600 |
| St. John's | 8 | – | 8 | .500 | 18 | – | 12 | .600 |
| Pittsburgh | 6 | – | 10 | .375 | 18 | – | 13 | .581 |
| Connecticut | 5 | – | 11 | .313 | 13 | – | 15 | .464 |
| Providence | 5 | – | 11 | .313 | 15 | – | 14 | .517 |
| Seton Hall | 2 | – | 14 | .125 | 9 | – | 19 | .321 |
† 1984 Big East tournament winner As of April 2, 1984; Rankings from AP Poll

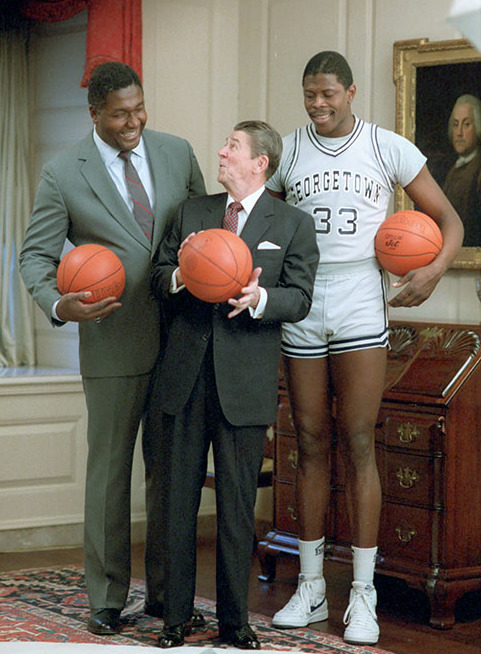
Coach John Thompson and center Patrick Ewing meet with U.S. President Ronald Reagan on November 12, 1984, after winning the 1984 National Championship the previous April.

The 1983–84 Georgetown Hoyas men's basketball team represented Georgetown University in the 1983–84 NCAA Division I college basketball season. John Thompson coached them in his 12th season as head coach. They played their home games at the Capital Centre in Landover, Maryland, except for one game played at McDonough Gymnasium on the Georgetown campus in Washington, D.C. The team was a member of the Big East Conference and finished the season with a record of 34–3 overall, 14–2 in Big East play. They won both the Big East regular-season championship, the 1984 Big East tournament championship, and they defeated Houston in the 1984 NCAA tournament final to win the only national championship in Georgetown history.

== Season recap ==
The team had a tremendous run during the regular season, losing only three games – by only two points each to DePaul and Villanova and by only four points to St. John's in a game in which St. John's junior guard Chris Mullin scored 33 points. Georgetown's junior center Patrick Ewing shot 60 percent from the field; averaged 16 points (despite only shooting the ball eight to 10 times in most games), 10 rebounds, and 3.6 blocked shots per game; led the Hoyas in scoring in 23 games, including 14 of the last 17 games; and scored 20 or more points ten times, including 20 against Pittsburgh, 23 (and 15 rebounds) against Connecticut, 23 against Providence, and 25 against Boston College.

Freshman forward Reggie Williams joined the team this season. Destined to become one of the greatest players in Georgetown history, Williams started only nine games, but he appeared in all 37 games and usually played 15 to 20 minutes, generally scoring eight to 10 points; he averaged 9.1 points per game overall and 8.4 points per game in Big East play. His season high was 22 points against Syracuse.

Sophomore guard-forward David Wingate played more at guard this season than he had the previous year. Among the top defenders in the Big East, he also was a strong offensive force for the Hoyas. During the two games of the Las Vegas Classic in late December 1983 – the second of which, on December 30, 1983, saw the first sell-out in the history of the new Thomas & Mack Center and was broadcast on national television by CBS – he scored a combined 45 points, shot 21-for-21 from the free-throw line, and was selected as the tournament's Most Valuable Player. He played in all 37 games and consistently scored nine to 12 points, leading the team in scoring in three games. He finished the season averaging 11.2 points per game, leading the team in steals, and second in assists.

Sophomore guard Michael Jackson missed the first five games of the season with a shoulder injury and did not start games consistently until January 1984, but he started 22 of the 31 games in which he played. He shot 56 percent from the field and averaged 10.5 points per game, and his 137 steals led the team.

Junior forward Bill Martin started the first six games of the season before moving to the bench in early December 1983 to play a role as a key reserve for the remainder of the season. Off the bench, he averaged 27 minutes per game in Georgetown's 16 Big East regular season games and had four double-doubles in conference play. In the two games against Boston College he had a combined 32 points and 20 rebounds, and in the two against Connecticut he scored a combined 22 points and had 17 rebounds. His best game, however, was a nationally televised mid-February 1984 non-conference contest against Brigham Young, in which he shot 8-for-8 from the field, had 23 points and 15 rebounds, and on defense held Cougars forward Devin Durrant, who was averaging 27.9 points per game, to 5-for-16 (31.3%) shooting from the field. Martin finished the year averaging 8.9 points per game.

Senior guard and team captain Gene Smith, a defensive specialist, saw limited playing time, but averaged 22 minutes a game and led the team in steals. In Big East play he shot 59% from the field.

The Hoyas were the Big East regular-season champions, finishing with a 14–2 record. They received a bye in the first round of the 1984 Big East men's basketball tournament and defeated Providence in the quarterfinals. They beat St. John's in the semifinals, with Ewing shooting 11-for-12 (91.7%) from the field and Williams scoring 17 points. They met arch-rival Syracuse in the final, in which Syracuse's Dwayne "Pearl" Washington scored 27 points, while Ewing also scored 27 and pulled down 16 rebounds. With Syracuse in the lead and Ewing sitting on the bench with four fouls, Georgetown freshman forward Michael Graham entered the game to contain Syracuse's Andre Hawkins, drawing national attention with his defensive effort. At one point, with Graham and Hawkins fighting for a rebound under the basket, Graham appeared to take a swing at Hawkins and an official immediately called a technical foul and ejected him from the game; after the officials conferred with one another, however, they changed the call to a personal foul, allowing Graham to stay in the game and incensing Syracuse fans. With Michael Jackson scoring critical late-game free throws – part of a 20-point performance, including 8-for-8 from the free-throw line – Georgetown came back to tie the game and force overtime, during which the Hoyas pulled away to an 81–72 win and the Big East tournament championship for the third time in the program's history, with Ewing averaging 23 points a game during the tournament. In the post-game press conference, Syracuse's head coach Jim Boeheim overturned a chair in anger and declared "The best team did not win tonight!"

Seeded No. 1 in the West Region of the 1984 NCAA tournament – the sixth of 14 consecutive Georgetown NCAA tournament appearances – the Hoyas received a first-round bye. They had a scare in the second round, narrowly missing being upset in a pre-shot-clock-era slowdown game against a Southern Methodist team led by center Jon Koncak. SMU led 24–16 at halftime. In the second half, Georgetown came back to lead 32–26 with eight minutes left, but SMU managed to tie the game at 34–34 with 2:46 to go. With 51 seconds left, SMU fouled Gene Smith, who missed the first shot of a one-and-one, but Ewing tipped the ball in for a basket and a 36–34 lead. After SMU's Johnny Fuller missed a shot, SMU was forced to foul Michael Jackson to stop the clock, and Jackson scored on one of his two free throws to give Georgetown a 37–34 lead. No three-point shot yet existed in the tournament, so the Mustangs raced down the court and scored to narrow the lead to 37–36, but then time expired. After the game, fans and sportswriters noted that had Smith made his free throws, SMU could have tied the game to put it into overtime, and had Ewing not tipped in Smith's miss, the Mustangs could have won the game with their basket on the final play.

Georgetown continued to advance, reaching the Final Four for the third time in school history and second time in three years to face Kentucky, a team which had never lost a national semifinal game and was led by the "Twin Towers," Sam Bowie and Melvin Turpin. Bowie and Turpin managed to get Ewing into foul trouble early, and with him on the bench and Reggie Williams shooting only 1-for-7 (14.3%) from the field during the game, the Wildcats raced out to a 27–15 lead with 3:06 left in the first half. After that however, the Hoyas made a defensive stand still unequalled in college basketball: Kentucky scored only two more points in the first half; the Wildcats also did not score in the first 9 minutes 55 seconds of the second half, missing their first 12 shots and after that shooting 3-for-21 (14.3%) during the remainder of the game. Overall, Kentucky shot 3-for-33 (9.1 percent) from the field during the second half. Although he played for only 17 minutes and suffered a season-ending foot injury in the second half, Gene Smith had one of the best defensive games of his career. Bowie and Turpin finished the game a combined 0-for-12, Wingate scored 12 points and held Kentucky's Jim Master to 2-for-7 (28.6%) shooting from the field, Michael Jackson scored 12 points and pulled down a career-high 10 rebounds, and Georgetown won 53–40 to advance to the national final for the third time in school history and second time in three years.

In the NCAA final, Georgetown faced Houston on April 2, 1984. Reggie Williams demonstrated his true potential for the first time, putting in a strong defensive performance and shooting 9-for-18 (50.0%) from the field with 19 points and seven rebounds in the game, while Wingate scored 16 points and Ewing managed 10 points and nine rebounds. Jackson scored 11 points and had six assists, two of which set up Ewing and Graham for decisive baskets late in the game. The game was decided well before the final whistle, and the Hoyas won the school's first national championship 84–75. Late in the game, with Georgetown enjoying a comfortable lead, Thompson began to pull starters out and give bench players some time on the court; the game's enduring image came when senior guard Fred Brown came out of the game. Two years earlier, Brown had mistakenly passed the ball to North Carolina's James Worthy in the last seconds of the 1982 championship game, ruining Georgetown's chances for a final game-winning shot and allowing North Carolina to take the national championship, and cameras had captured Thompson consoling a devastated Brown with a hug as the Tar Heels celebrated. As Brown left the 1984 championship game, cameras caught Brown and Thompson again embracing on the sideline, this time to celebrate a victory.

The 1983–84 Hoyas were ranked No. 2 in the season's final Associated Press Poll and Coaches' Poll and won what was then a school-record 34 games. They remain the only Georgetown men's basketball team to win a national championship.

== Roster ==
Junior center Patrick Ewing returned to Georgetown as head coach from 2017 to 2023.

1983–84 Georgetown Hoyas men's basketball team
Players
Coaches

| Pos. | # | Name | Height | Weight | Year | Previous school | Hometown |
|---|---|---|---|---|---|---|---|
| G | 20 | Fred Brown | 6 ft 5 in (1.96 m) | 208 lb (94 kg) | Sr | Adlai E. Stevenson HS | Bronx, NY |
| G | 22 | Gene Smith (C) | 6 ft 2 in (1.88 m) | 190 lb (86 kg) | Sr | McKinley Technology HS | Washington, DC |
| F | 24 | Bill Martin | 6 ft 7 in (2.01 m) | 202 lb (92 kg) | Jr | McKinley Technology HS | Washington, DC |
| G | 30 | Michael Jackson | 6 ft 1 in (1.85 m) | 175 lb (79 kg) | So | South Lakes HS | Reston, VA |
| G | 32 | Horace Broadnax | 6 ft 1 in (1.85 m) | 185 lb (84 kg) | So | Plant City HS | Plant City, FL |
| C | 33 | Patrick Ewing | 7 ft 0 in (2.13 m) | 240 lb (109 kg) | Jr | Cambridge Rindge and Latin School | Cambridge, MA |
| G/F | 34 | Reggie Williams | 6 ft 7 in (2.01 m) | 185 lb (84 kg) | Fr | Paul Laurence Dunbar HS | Baltimore, MD |
| G/F | 40 | David Wingate | 6 ft 5 in (1.96 m) | 180 lb (82 kg) | So | Paul Laurence Dunbar HS | Baltimore, MD |
| F | 42 | Clinton Dairsow | 6 ft 7 in (2.01 m) | 225 lb (102 kg) | Fr | Arundel HS/United States Army | Odenton, MD |
| F | 50 | Michael Graham | 6 ft 9 in (2.06 m) | 210 lb (95 kg) | Fr | Spingarn HS | Washington, DC |
| F/C | 52 | Ralph Dalton | 6 ft 11 in (2.11 m) | 240 lb (109 kg) | Jr | Fishburne Military School (Va.) | Suitland, MD |
| F | 55 | Victor Morris | 6 ft 9 in (2.06 m) | 220 lb (100 kg) | So | Kashmere HS | Houston, TX |

Head coach

- John Thompson

Assistant coach(es)

- Craig Esherick
- Mike Riley

Legend

- (C) Team captain
- (S) Suspended
- (I) Ineligible
- (W) Walk-on
- Injured
- Current redshirt

Roster
Last update: October 16, 2016

== Rankings ==
Ranking movements Legend: ██ Increase in ranking ██ Decrease in ranking
| | Week | | | | | | | | | | | | | | | | |
| Poll | Pre | 1 | 2 | 3 | 4 | 5 | 6 | 7 | 8 | 9 | 10 | 11 | 12 | 13 | 14 | 15 | Final |
|---|---|---|---|---|---|---|---|---|---|---|---|---|---|---|---|---|---|
| AP | 4 | 3 | 3 | 5 | 5 | 5 | 4 | 4 | 6 | 4 | 4 | 3 | 2 | 2 | 4 | 2 | 2 |
| Coaches | Not released | | 3 | 5 | 5 | 5 | 4 | 4 | 6 | 4 | 4 | 3 | 2 | 2 | 4 | 2 | 2 |

== Schedule and results ==
Sources

- All times are Eastern

| Date time, TV | Rank^{#} | Opponent^{#} | Result | Record | High points | High rebounds | High assists | Site (attendance) city, state |
Regular season
| November 25*; 6:00 p.m., WTTG | No. 4 | at Hawaii-Hilo | W 71–42 | 1–0 | 17 – Brown | 7 – Ewing | 6 – Brown | Civic Auditorium (1,800); Hilo, HI |
| November 26*; 6:00 p.m., WTTG | No. 4 | at Hawaii-Hilo | W 97–35 | 2–0 | 18 – Williams | 11 – Ewing | 7 – Smith | Civic Auditorium (1,800); Hilo, HI |
| November 30*; 8:00 p.m., WTTG | No. 3 | Morgan State | W 91–38 | 3–0 | 0 – Tied | 0 – Tied | 0 – Tied | Capital Centre (5,643); Landover, MD |
| December 3*; 1:00 p.m., WTTG | No. 3 | Saint Francis | W 84–61 | 4–0 | 0 – Tied | 0 – Tied | 0 – Tied | Capital Centre (8,300); Landover, MD |
| December 6*; 8:00 p.m., WTTG | No. 3 | Saint Leo | W 82–50 | 5–0 | 0 – Tied | 0 – Tied | 0 – Tied | Capital Centre (N/A); Landover, MD |
| December 10*; 9:00 p.m., Metrosports; ESPN | No. 3 | at No. 13 DePaul | L 61–63 | 5–1 | 16 – Ewing | 12 – Ewing | 4 – Brown | Rosemont Horizon (17,499); Rosemont, IL |
| December 14*; 8:00 p.m., WTTG | No. 5 | South Carolina State | W 97–67 | 6–1 | 0 – Tied | 0 – Tied | 0 – Tied | Capital Centre (5,334); Landover, MD |
| December 18*; 1:00 p.m., WTTG | No. 5 | American | W 80−62 | 7–1 | 0 – Tied | 0 – Tied | 0 – Tied | Capital Centre (6,305); Landover, MD |
| December 21*; 8:00 p.m., WTTG | No. 5 | Western Kentucky | W 53–41 | 8–1 | 0 – Tied | 0 – Tied | 0 – Tied | Capital Centre (2,958); Landover, MD |
| December 29*; 9:00 p.m., WTTG | No. 5 | vs. Marshall; Las Vegas Classic | W 82−71 | 9–1 | 0 – Tied | 0 – Tied | 0 – Tied | Thomas & Mack Center (18,500); Paradise, NV |
| December 30*; 11:30 p.m., CBS | No. 5 | vs. Nevada-Las Vegas; Las Vegas Classic | W 69−67 ^{OT} | 10–1 | 24 – Ewing | 12 – Ewing | 4 – Tied | Thomas & Mack Center (18,500); Paradise, NV |
| January 4; 8:00 p.m., Metrosports | No. 4 | at Connecticut; Rivalry | W 81–69 | 11–1 (1–0) | 18 – Ewing | 10 – Martin | 4 – Tied | Hartford Civic Center (15,673); Hartford, CT |
| January 7; 12:00 p.m., Metrosports | No. 4 | at Seton Hall | W 74–63 | 12–1 (2–0) | 17 – Martin | 12 – Martin | 7 – Jackson | Brendan Byrne Arena (8,793); East Rutherford, NJ |
| January 9*; 8:00 p.m., WTTG | No. 4 | Monmouth | W 74–54 | 13–1 | 0 – Tied | 0 – Tied | 0 – Tied | Capital Centre (4,719); Landover, MD |
| January 12; 6:00 p.m., ESPN | No. 4 | Villanova | L 63–65 ^{2OT} | 13–2 (2–1) | 16 – Jackson | 15 – Ewing | 4 – Wingate | Capital Centre (9,032); Landover, MD |
| January 18; 8:00 p.m., Metrosports | No. 6 | Providence | W 80–76 | 14–2 (3–1) | 18 – Tied | 10 – Ewing | 4 – Tied | McDonough Gymnasium (4,328); Washington, DC |
| January 21; 3:00 p.m., NBC | No. 6 | at No. 14 St. John's | W 83–61 | 15–2 (4–1) | 18 – Ewing | 10 – Ewing | 7 – Wingate | Madison Square Garden (15,901); New York, NY |
| January 23; 8:00 p.m., Metrosports; ESPN | No. 6 | No. 16 Boston College | W 92–83 | 16–2 (5–1) | 17 – Williams | 13 – Ewing | 6 – Jackson | Capital Centre (11,051); Landover, MD |
| January 28; 12:00 p.m., Metrosports | No. 4 | at Pittsburgh | W 63–52 | 17–2 (6–1) | 20 – Ewing | 9 – Ewing | 4 – Williams | Fitzgerald Field House (6,686); Pittsburgh, PA |
| January 30; 8:00 p.m., Metrosports; ESPN | No. 4 | at No. 20 Syracuse; Rivalry | W 80–67 | 18–2 (7–1) | 22 – Williams | 7 – Tied | 3 – Tied | Carrier Dome (30,758); Syracuse, NY |
| February 4; 12:00 p.m., Metrosports | No. 4 | Connecticut; Rivalry | W 87–62 | 19–2 (8–1) | 23 – Ewing | 15 – Ewing | 5 – Williams | Capital Centre (11,721); Landover, MD |
| February 9; 8:00 p.m., Metrosports | No. 3 | Seton Hall | W 78–54 | 20–2 (9–1) | 14 – Ewing | 11 – Ewing | 7 – Jackson | Capital Centre (8,852); Landover, MD |
| February 11*; 2:00 p.m., CBS | No. 3 | Brigham Young | W 67–51 | 21–2 | 23 – Martin | 14 – Martin | 7 – Jackson | Capital Centre (14,371); Landover, MD |
| February 15; 9:00 p.m., Metrosports; USA | No. 2 | at Villanova | W 59–46 | 22–2 (10–1) | 18 – Ewing | 8 – Ewing | 6 – Wingate | Spectrum (16,333); Philadelphia, PA |
| February 18; 8:00 p.m., USA | No. 2 | at Providence | W 59–38 | 23–2 (11–1) | 23 – Ewing | 8 – Tied | 7 – Jackson | Providence Civic Center (12,150); Providence, RI |
| February 21; 8:00 p.m., ESPN | No. 2 | St. John's | L 71–75 | 23–3 (11–2) | 13 – Wingate | 14 – Ewing | 4 – Wingate | Capital Centre (11,136); Landover, MD |
| February 25; 2:00 p.m., CBS | No. 2 | at Boston College | W 83–70 | 24–3 (12–2) | 25 – Ewing | 11 – Ewing | 5 – Jackson | Springfield Civic Center (8,760); Springfield, MA |
| February 29; 8:00 p.m., Metrosports; USA | No. 4 | Pittsburgh | W 71–52 | 25–3 (13–2) | 17 – Ewing | 9 – Martin | 6 – Jackson | Capital Centre (9,121); Landover, MD |
| March 3; 12:00 p.m., Metrosports | No. 4 | No. 16 Syracuse; Rivalry | W 88–71 | 26–3 (14–2) | 16 – Ewing | 10 – Ewing | 4 – Browns | Capital Centre (19,035); Landover, MD |
Big East tournament
| March 8; 7:00 p.m., Metrosports | (1) No. 2 | vs. (8) Providence; Quarterfinal | W 70–50 | 27–3 | 18 – Ewing | 9 – Martin | 6 – Jackson | Madison Square Garden (19,591); New York, NY |
| March 9; 9:00 p.m., Metrosports | (1) No. 2 | vs. (5) St. John's; Semifinal | W 79–68 | 28–3 | 24 – Ewing | 5 – Tied | 5 – Tied | Madison Square Garden (19,591); New York, NY |
| March 10; 7:00 p.m., Metrosports; ESPN | (1) No. 2 | vs. (2) Syracuse; Final/Rivalry | W 82–71 ^{OT} | 29–3 | 27 – Ewing | 16 – Ewing | 5 – Tied | Madison Square Garden (19,591); New York, NY |
NCAA Tournament
| March 18; 4:30 p.m., CBS | (1 W) No. 2 | vs. (9 W) Southern Methodist; West Region Second Round | W 37–36 | 30–3 | 10 – Ewing | 8 – Graham | 3 – Tied | Friel Court (11,300); Pullman, WA |
| March 23; 12:10 a.m., CBS | (1 W) No. 2 | vs. (5 W) No. 13 Nevada-Las Vegas; West Region Semifinal | W 62–48 | 31–3 | 16 – Tied | 14 – Ewing | 4 – Jackson | Pauley Pavilion (12,542); Los Angeles |
| March 25; 4:00 p.m., CBS | (1 W) No. 2 | vs. (10 W) Dayton; West Region Final | W 61–49 | 32–3 | 15 – Ewing | 10 – Martin | 4 – Jackson | Pauley Pavilion (12,542); Los Angeles |
| March 31; 6:12 p.m., CBS | (1 W) No. 2 | vs. (1 ME) No. 3 Kentucky; Semifinal | W 53–40 | 33–3 | 12 – Jackson | 10 – Jackson | 3 – Jackson | Kingdome (38,471); Seattle, WA |
| April 2; 9:12 p.m., CBS | (1 W) No. 2 | vs. (2 MW) No. 5 Houston; Final | W 84–75 | 34–3 | 19 – Williams | 9 – Ewing | 6 – Jackson | Kingdome (38,471); Seattle, WA |
*Non-conference game. ^{#}Rankings from AP Poll. (#) Tournament seedings in parentheses. W=West Region. All times are in Eastern Time. ME=Mideast Region MW=Midwest Region.

== Player statistics ==
| Player | G | GS | MIN | FG | FGA | Pct. | FT | FTA | Pct. | REB | PF | AST | TO | BLK | STL | PTS | Avg. |
|---|---|---|---|---|---|---|---|---|---|---|---|---|---|---|---|---|---|
Patrick Ewing
David Wingate
Michael Jackson
Reggie Williams
Bill Martin
Michael Graham
| Horace Broadnax | 35 | 1 | 448 | 69 | 159 | .434 | 28 | 34 | .853 | 49 | 42 | 42 | 36 | 0 | 22 | 167 | 4.8 |
| Gene Smith | 36 | 8 | 830 | 45 | 88 | .511 | 42 | 71 | .592 | 74 | 96 | 92 | 55 | 2 | 67 | 132 | 3.7 |
| Fred Brown | 36 | 36 | 585 | 36 | 74 | .486 | 42 | 65 | .646 | 93 | 82 | 95 | 60 | 5 | 34 | 114 | 3.2 |
Ralph Dalton
Victor Morris
Clinton Dairsow
| Team | | | | | | | | | | 92 | | | | | | | |
| Georgetown | 37 | 37 | 1495 | 1043 | 2051 | .509 | 662 | 977 | .678 | 1481 | 802 | 631 | 546 | 166 | 317 | 2748 | 74.3 |
| Opponents | 37 | 37 | 1495 | 799 | 2025 | .395 | 545 | 821 | .664 | 1129 | 820 | 457 | 569 | 80 | 262 | 2143 | 57.9 |

== Media ==
=== Local radio ===
| Flagship station | Play-by-play | Studio host |
|---|---|---|
| WWDC AM 1260 | Rich Chvotkin | |
