= 1984 Big East men's basketball tournament =

- Classification: Division I
- Season: 1983–84
- Teams: 9
- Site: Madison Square Garden; New York City
- Champions: Georgetown (3rd title)
- Winning coach: John Thompson (3rd title)
- MVP: Patrick Ewing (Georgetown)
- Television: Metrosports/ESPN (Entire Tournament)

1983–84 Big East men's basketball standings
	Conf.				Overall
Team	W		L	PCT	W		L	PCT
No. 2 Georgetown†	14	–	2	.875	34	–	3	.919
No. 18 Syracuse	12	–	4	.750	23	–	9	.719
Villanova	12	–	4	.750	19	–	12	.613
Boston College	8	–	8	.500	18	–	12	.600
St. John's	8	–	8	.500	18	–	12	.600
Pittsburgh	6	–	10	.375	18	–	13	.581
Connecticut	5	–	11	.313	13	–	15	.464
Providence	5	–	11	.313	15	–	14	.517
Seton Hall	2	–	14	.125	9	–	19	.321
† 1984 Big East tournament winner As of April 2, 1984; Rankings from AP Poll

The 1984 Big East men's basketball tournament took place at Madison Square Garden in New York City, from March 8 to March 11, 1984. Its winner received the Big East Conference's automatic bid to the 1984 NCAA tournament. It is a single-elimination tournament with four rounds. Georgetown had the best regular season conference record and received the #1 seed.

Georgetown defeated Syracuse in the championship game 82–71, to claim its third Big East tournament championship.

== Teams ==
Seed	Team	Coach	Finished	Final Opponent	Score
1	Georgetown	John Thompson	Champion	2 Syracuse	W 82-71
2	Syracuse	Jim Boheim	Runner-Up	1 Georgetown	L 71-82
3	Villanova	Rollie Massimino	Semifinals	2 Syracuse	L 65-66
4	Boston College	Gary Williams	Quarterfinals	5 St. John's	L 56-57
5	St. John's	Lou Carnesecca	Semifinals	1 Georgetown	L 68-79
6	Pittsburgh	Roy Chipman	Quarterfinals	3 Villanova	L 65-75
7	Connecticut	Dom Perno	Quarterfinals	2 Syracuse	L 58-73
8	Providence	Joe Mullaney	Quarterfinals	1 Georgetown	L 50-70
9	Seton Hall	P.J. Carlesimo	First Round	8 Providence	L 55-59

== Bracket ==
First round March 8, 1984
8	Providence	59
9	Seton Hall	55

Quarterfinals; March 9, 1984
1	#2 Georgetown	70
8	Providence	50
4	Boston College	56
5	St. John's	57
2	Syracuse	73
7	Connecticut	58
3	Villanova	75
6	Pittsburgh	65

Semifinals; March 10, 1984
1	#2 Georgetown	79
5	St. John's	68
2	Syracuse	66
3	Villanova	65

Championship Game; March 11, 1984
1	#2 Georgetown	82^{OT}
2	Syracuse	71

== Game summaries ==
=== Quarterfinals summary ===
TCS MetroSports

Thursday, March 9
7:00 PM EST

#8 Providence Friars 50, #1 Georgetown Hoyas 70
Pts: Starks – 16; Rebs: Canty – 6 Asts: Donovan – 3	Pts: Ewing – 18; Rebs: Martin – 9 Asts: Jackson – 6 Halftime Score: Providence, 25-23

Madison Square Garden – New York City, New York
Attendance: 19,591

=== Semifinals summary ===
TCS MetroSports

Friday, March 10
approx. 9:00 PM EST

#5 St. John's Redmen 68, #1 Georgetown Hoyas 79
Pts: Mullin – 29; Rebs: Wennington – 7 Asts: Jackson – 11	Pts: Ewing – 24; Rebs: Dalton, Ewing – 5 Asts: Jackson, Williams – 5 Halftime Score: Georgetown, 41-30

Madison Square Garden – New York City, New York
Attendance: 19,591

=== Championship game summary ===
TCS MetroSports
ESPN

Saturday, March 11
7:00 PM EST

#2 Syracuse Orangemen 71, #1 Georgetown Hoyas 82 (OT)
Pts: Washington – 27; Rebs: Alexis – 9 Asts: Washington – 6	Pts: Ewing – 27; Rebs: Ewing – 16; Asts: Williams, Wingate – 5 Halftime Score: Georgetown, 36-31; End of Regulation: 63-63

Madison Square Garden – New York City, New York
Attendance: 19,591
Referees: Larry Lembo, Dick Paparo, Jody Sylvester

== Announcers ==
Date	Seed	Teams	Flagship station	Play-by-play announcer	Color analyst(s)
1984	1	Georgetown	WWDC AM 1260 (Georgetown)	Rich Chvotkin	

== Awards ==
Most Valuable Player: Patrick Ewing, Georgetown

All Tournament Team

- Patrick Ewing, Georgetown
- Andre Hawkins, Syracuse
- Michael Jackson, Georgetown
- Ed Pinckney, Villanova
- Dwayne Washington, Syracuse
