= Raycom Sports =

Sports television syndicator

- Type: Subsidiary
- Industry: Sports broadcasting
- Founded: June 19, 1979; 47 years ago
- Founders: Rick and Dee Ray
- Headquarters: Charlotte, North Carolina, U.S.
- Area served: United States (Nationwide)
- Key people: Hunter Nickell (CEO)
- Services: Sports Broadcast Television; Production; Sales & Marketing; Syndication; Distribution; Event Management
- Number of employees: 51 (2016)
- Parent: Gray Media
- Website: raycomsports.com

Raycom Sports is a Charlotte, North Carolina–based producer of sports television programs owned by Gray Media.

The company was founded in 1979 by husband and wife Rick and Dee Ray. In the 1980s, Raycom Sports established a joint venture with Jefferson-Pilot Communications that made them partners on the main Atlantic Coast Conference (ACC) college basketball package. Raycom was acquired in 1994 by Ellis Communications. Two years later, Ellis was acquired by a group led by Retirement Systems of Alabama, which renamed the entire company Raycom Media to build upon the awareness of Raycom Sports. The company was acquired by Gray in 2019.

Raycom Sports is known for its tenures with the ACC, and also had former relationships with the SEC, Big Eight, Big Ten and Southwest conferences. In the 2010s, Raycom lost both its ACC and SEC rights to ESPN (a network which had, in its early years, aired Raycom-distributed ACC basketball games for national broadcasts), which transferred the rights to in-house cable networks ACC Network and SEC Network. Raycom Sports continued to produce a package of syndicated ACC telecasts aired by the Bally Sports channels and other regional sports networks; this package moved to The CW in 2023, with Raycom continuing to produce the package for CW Sports.

In the 2020s, Raycom Sports began wider expansions into professional sports broadcasting, including serving as producer for U.S.-based games in the Professional Women's Hockey League (PWHL), being involved in Gray Media's acquisition of the regional rights to the New Orleans Pelicans, and serving as a production partner for the Atlanta Braves' new production unit BravesVision.

== History ==
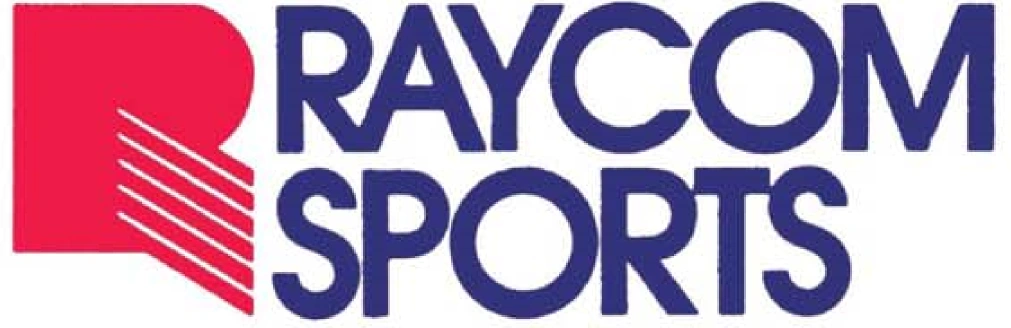
The original logo for Raycom Sports, used from 1979 to 1991.

=== Founding ===
Raycom Sports was founded in July 1979 by Rick and Dee Ray in Charlotte. Rick Ray was a program manager at WCCB in Charlotte when he proposed that WCCB, which had become an independent station a year earlier after losing its ABC affiliation, produce more basketball games. Ray thought that the games would be very profitable for WCCB given North Carolina's reputation as a college basketball hotbed.

The company's first event was the Great Alaska Shootout. Ken Haines was one of the first hires for Raycom Sports. In its first year, the company acquired rights to basketball games from the Atlantic Coast Conference, some of which were syndicated to the newly launched cable sports channel ESPN. In 1988, Raycom added Big Ten Conference games to its portfolio after acquiring Rasmussen Communications. The company also extended its contract through 1995 to gain rights to all non-network conference games. The following year, Raycom established a radio division, acquiring the rights to the University of Illinois and Purdue University radio networks.

=== Partnership with Jefferson-Pilot Communications ===
In 1980, Raycom teamed with Jefferson-Pilot Communications for production of ACC basketball games. The package began in 1957 when Greensboro businessman C. D. Chesley piped North Carolina's run to the 1957 national title to a hastily created network of five stations across North Carolina. It proved popular enough that it expanded to a full-time package of basketball games the following season. The January 14, 1973 game between NC State and Maryland was the first Super Bowl Sunday college basketball national telecast. Chelsey would again syndicate an ACC game (Maryland at NC State) nationally on Super Bowl Sunday the following year. The ACC title game was often syndicated outside of the ACC region (such as in New York) in these years.

The commentators that Chesley employed included Jim Thacker, Ray Scott, Billy Packer and Dick Enberg (on the UCLA at Maryland game on December 28, 1974 and the Notre Dame at Maryland game on January 4, 1975, both which were co-productions with TVS). In 1978, Chesley (who controlled the ACC rights) wanted NBC to televise some ACC conference games as part of its national package as it had done the previous few years. However, NBC wanted to feature intersectional games. Chesley sold the rights to the ACC tournament final to ABC.

Chesley retained the rights to ACC games until 1981, when the conference bought the remainder of the contract and sold the rights to Metrosports of Rockville, Maryland. Some ACC games were telecast by Raycom alone in 1980 through several television stations in North Carolina, including WCCB.

For the 1981–82 season, the two companies formed a joint venture, Raycom/JP Sports, that won the package after the ACC declined Metrosports' bid to renew its contract. Raycom also assisted ESPN2 by selling a 1995 Duke–North Carolina basketball game that increased the channel's credibility with cable operators. In the 1983 season, Raycom experimented with a cable-oriented ACC service known as ACC Ticket. Raycom built a large array of broadcasting rights until the 1990s, with rights for ACC, SEC, Pac-10, Metro, Big Eight, Big 12 and Southwest conferences. Raycom sublicensed ACC games to national broadcasters (including CBS and ESPN), regional sports networks and local stations. However, with the rise of cable and regional sports networks, Raycom began to lose many of its college rights to competitors.

In 1987, Raycom Sports created an entertainment division, Raycom Entertainment, with an hour-long special titled Elvis' Graceland, hosted by Priscilla Presley, that originally aired on Showtime. The new Raycom Entertainment division was led by Peter G. Lenz, who had previously run The Television Program Source.

Unlike other sports syndicators, Raycom controlled nearly all advertising for its broadcasts, but it paid stations for airtime. While this was a risky strategy at first, Raycom reaped a huge windfall because ACC games frequently garnered high ratings. The ACC's regional territory included several fast-growing markets such as Charlotte, the Piedmont Triad, the Triangle, Hampton Roads, Richmond, Baltimore and Washington, D.C.

=== Raycom Media ===
In 1994, Raycom Sports was sold to Ellis Communications but remained autonomous, with its own headquarters in Charlotte. Dee Ray left in 1994 while Rick Ray left in 1995. When an investment group led by Retirement Systems of Alabama bought Ellis in 1996, the new owners elected to preserve the Raycom brand, renaming the entire broadcast group Raycom Media.

In 1994, Raycom first organized a preseason college basketball event known as the Great Eight, televised by ESPN, which aimed to feature two nights of doubleheaders between regional finalists from the previous season's NCAA tournament (with the highest-ranked team eliminated before the regional finals serving as a backup if a team declined an invitation). The inaugural edition featured Boston College, Duke, Florida, Michigan, Missouri, Purdue, Villanova and UConn (which replaced Arkansas as a backup). In 1996, the event moved to United Center under a five-year contract.

By August 1997, Raycom lost the Pac-10 and Big 12 college-football advertising sales rights to Fox Sports Networks. Several executives also left the company, including Steedman.

In 2002, Raycom founded the Continental Tire Bowl in Charlotte. It continues to operate the game, which later changed its name to the Meineke Car Care Bowl until 2011, when it became the Belk Bowl.

Starting in 2004, the Raycom/JP partnership took control of production of syndicated ACC football games; Jefferson-Pilot had produced ACC football alone since September 1984. In 2007, Raycom began broadcasting the ACC men's basketball tournament in high definition and broadcast four ACC men's regular-season games in HD in 2008. In 2006, in accordance with Lincoln National Corporation's acquisition of Jefferson-Pilot, Jefferson-Pilot Communications was renamed Lincoln Financial Media, and the venture was renamed Raycom/LF Sports.

On November 12, 2007, Raycom Media announced its intention to acquire some of the television broadcasting properties of Lincoln Financial Media—including three television stations, plus Lincoln Financial Sports—for $583 million. Lincoln Financial Sports was merged into Raycom Sports later that year, giving it full control over basketball and football rights for both the ACC and SEC.

In 2008, Raycom lost its SEC rights to ESPN, who reached a 15-year deal to become its main media rightsholder alongside CBS. ESPN continued to provide a syndicated package of games in a manner similar to that of Raycom, produced via its own syndication division under the on-air branding of SEC Network until the launch of an SEC cable network under the same name in 2014.

In 2010, ESPN also acquired rights to ACC football and basketball, replacing Raycom. In a discussion between ACC commissioner John Swofford and ESPN president John Skipper, Swofford acknowledged Raycom's longstanding relationship with the conference and requested that it continue to be involved in some way. ESPN ultimately negotiated a sublicensing agreement with Raycom that would allow it to continue producing a syndicated package of ACC football and basketball broadcasts (which, as a condition of the deal, were rebranded under the new on-air title of ACC Network in 2010). Additionally, Raycom became responsible for the ACC's digital media operations and sponsorship sales.

In addition to the syndication component of the 2010 agreement, Raycom brokered a deal for another package of ACC football and basketball content that was dubbed the ACC on Regional Sports Networks (ACC RSN). ACC RSN broadcasts were produced by Raycom Sports production staff as Fox College Football broadcasts from the studios of flagship Fox Sports South and distributed across the cable sports networks of Fox and others, mainly throughout the eastern United States. Wes Durham served as the lead play-by-play voice of both football and basketball RSN packages from 2013 to 2019.

In 2012, Raycom Media acquired Tupelo-Honey, a producer of sports and entertainment programming. Three years later, it also acquired WebStream Sports, an Indianapolis-based producer of sports programming. In late 2016, the companies were merged to form the subsidiary Tupelo Raycom.

Haines retired as president at the end of 2015. Hunter Nickell, a former Speed Channel executive, replaced Haines as CEO in May 2016.

In January 2018, Raycom Sports announced a partnership with Blizzard Entertainment to produce a weekly television program chronicling Heroes of the Dorm—the official collegiate tournament of its video game Heroes of the Storm.

=== End of ACC syndication ===
On July 21, 2016, ESPN announced a 20-year extension of its contract with the ACC and the launch of an ACC Network cable channel in 2019. ESPN also acquired the secondary ACC rights previously held by Raycom. However, Raycom Sports was to continue to serve as the ACC's RSN and digital partner, and would be subcontracted by ESPN to produce event coverage for the new ACC Network. During the 2018–19 academic year, the ACC Network branding was reverted to Raycom Sports to avoid confusion with the ESPN-run ACC Network. Raycom's final syndicated ACC telecast was the 2019 ACC men's basketball tournament final.

=== Purchase by Gray Television ===
On June 25, 2018, Albany, Georgia-based media group Gray Television announced its purchase of Raycom Media (Raycom Sports' parent) for $3.65 billion. The FCC approved the sale on December 20, 2018, and it was completed on January 2, 2019, making Raycom Sports a wholly owned subsidiary of Gray.

In July 2021, Raycom launched the streaming-only Origin Sports Network, which rebroadcasts games featuring famous athletes. The network also airs some original programming.

On July 13, 2023, after Bally Sports relinquished its rights to its ACC package, The CW announced that it would acquire the package beginning that season under a four-year deal, with Raycom producing the games for CW Sports.

In collaboration with Dome Productions, Raycom Sports is handling production of home games for U.S.-based teams in the Professional Women's Hockey League.

Raycom Sports has been involved in Gray's increasing pushes into regional broadcasting of professional sports; in the 2024–25 season, Gray became the regional broadcaster for the NBA's New Orleans Pelicans, with Raycom Sports handling production for the broadcasts. In 2025, Gray and Raycom Sports began a relationship with the Atlanta Braves of Major League Baseball, initially providing production for a package of spring training games on a network of Gray Media stations in the team's market, and airing a regular season package produced by FanDuel Sports Network South. When FanDuel Sports Network pulled out of its agreements with MLB teams as part of a wind-down of operations, Raycom would be brought on by the Braves as the production partner for its new television operation BravesVision beginning in the 2026 season. Later that year, Gray and Raycom assumed rights to the NBA's Atlanta Hawks under similar circumstances, with games airing on WANF and Gray's Peachtree Sports Network subchannels.

== Personalities ==
=== College basketball ===
- Mike Gminski analyst (2003–2019)
- Dan Bonner analyst (1983–2019)
- Tim Brando play-by-play (1990–2019)
- Steve Martin play-by-play (1991–2019)

=== College football ===
- Dave Archer analyst (2010–2019)
- Tommy Bowden analyst (2011–2019)
- Tim Brant play-by-play (2008–2016)
- Steve Martin play-by-play (1991–2019)

=== College baseball ===
- Tommy Hutton analyst (2012–2019)

== Awards ==
=== Midsouth Regional Emmy Awards ===
Raycom Sports' production department won 34 Midsouth Regional Emmy Awards between 2009 and 2020. The company earned a total of 73 nominations in that span. Winning streaks include six straight wins in "Sports Segment" (2014–19), seven wins in "Sports/Live Event" in an eight-year span and five wins in "Sports Program" in a six-year span.

==== 2009 (23rd Annual Awards) ====
- Sports Program/Series – "Football Saturdays in the South" (Rob Reichley, Alex Farmartino, Dave Barringer, Jeremy Williams, Lance Stewart, & Beverly Rumley)
- Sports Segment – "Skipper" (Alex Farmartino)
- Editor/Short Form – "ACC football open featuring Chris Daughtry" (Dave Barringer)
- Photography/Short Form – "ACC football open featuring Chris Daughtry" (Dave Barringer & Jeremy Williams)

==== 2010 (24th Annual Awards) ====
- Sports Program/Series – "Football Saturdays in the South" (Rob Reichley, Alex Farmartino, Dave Barringer, Jeremy Williams, Lance Stewart & Beverly Rumley)
- Sports Segment – "Cameron Crazies" (Jeremy Williams)
- Editor/Short Form – "SEC football open featuring Rascal Flatts" (Dave Barringer. Jeremy Williams, Chris Stevens)
- Director/Short Form – "SEC football open featuring Rascal Flatts" (Dave Barringer)

==== 2011 (25th Annual Awards) ====
- Magazine Special – "ACC Road Trip" (Tommy Kane, Alex Farmartino, Jeremy Williams, Dave Barringer)

==== 2012 (26th Annual Awards) ====
- Sports Program/Series – "Football Saturdays in the South" (Rob Reichley, Alex Farmartino, Dave Barringer, Jeremy Williams)
- Sports Segment – "Big Dawg" (Alex Farmartino)
- Magazine Special – "ACC Road Trip" (Tommy Kane, Alex Farmartino, Jeremy Williams)

==== 2013 (27th Annual Awards) ====
- Sports Program/Series – "Football Saturdays in the South" (Rob Reichley, Alex Farmartino, Dave Barringer, Jeremy Williams & Chris Duzan)
- Sports Live Event Game – "ACC Basketball: Duke vs North Carolina" (Rob Reichley, Billy McCoy)

==== 2014 (28th Annual Awards) ====
- Sports Program/Series – "Football Saturdays in the South" (Rob Reichley, Alex Farmartino, Dave Barringer, Jeremy Williams, Chris Duzan, Maxwell Brooke & Richard Brooke)
- Sports Live Event Game – "ACC Football: NC State vs North Carolina" (Rob Reichley, Roy Alfers)
- Sports Segment – "Rodney Rogers: The Durham Bull" (Jeremy Williams, Rob Reichley, Maxwell Brooke)

==== 2015 (29th Annual Awards) ====
- Sports Live Event Game – "ACC Basketball: NC State vs North Carolina" (Dave Barringer, Billy McCoy)
- Documentary/Topical – "Head Impact Research in the ACC" (Alex Farmartino)
- Sports Segment – "Toomer's Corner: The Final Roll" (Richard Brooke)
- Sports Promo Spot – "Duke/North Carolina: Making of a Masterpiece" (Jeremy Williams, Boris Rogers, Josh Hairston, Richard Brooke)

==== 2016 (30th Annual Awards) ====
- Documentary/Historical – "Charles Scott" (Jeremy Williams, Rob Reichley, David Daly, Maxwell Brooke, Richard Brooke)
- Sports Segment – "Brian Stann" (Dave Barringer)
- Sports Promo Spot – "Numbers of a Rivalry: Duke/North Carolina 2015 Tease" (Richard Brooke & Maxwell Brooke)

==== 2017 (31st Annual Awards) ====
- Sports Live Event Game – "2016 ACC Tournament Championship" (Rob Reichley, Alex Farmartino, Dave Barringer, Billy McCoy, Jeremy Williams, Chris Duzan, Jonathan Robbins, Josh Vinson)
- Documentary/Historical – "The Red Bandanna" (Alex Farmartino, Chris Duzan, Maxwell Brooke)
- Sports Segment – "Ever Faithful: The Resurrection of UAB Football" (Richard Brooke, Maxwell Brooke, Timothy Alexander, Jordan Smith, Kortney Cowart, Michael Shikany)

==== 2018 (32nd Annual Awards) ====
- Sports Live Event Game – "2017 ACC Tournament Championship" (Rob Reichley, Lonnie Dale, Alex Farmartino, Dave Barringer, Jeremy Williams, Jonathan Robbins, Josh Vinson)
- Sports Segment – "James Conner – Conner Strong" (Alex Farmartino)

==== 2019 (33rd Annual Awards) ====
- Sports Live Event Game – "2018 ACC Tournament Championship" (Rob Reichley, Alex Farmartino, Dave Barringer, Jonathan Robbins. Josh Vinson, Jordan Smith)
- Documentary/Topical – "Ramah" (Alex Farmartino, Maxwell Brooke, Josh Vinson, Jonathan Robbins)
- Sports Segment – "Rory Coleman" (Josh Vinson)

==== 2020 (34th Annual Awards) ====
- Sports Live Event Game – "2019 ACC Tournament" (Rob Reichley, Alex Farmartino, Lonnie Dale, Billy McCoy, Maxwell Brooke, Jordan Smith, Stone Hill)
- Sports Promo Spot – "Battle of the Blues" (Jordan Smith, Richard Brooke & Maxwell Brooke)

== Other programming ==
Raycom was to have produced Team Racing Auto Circuit auto racing for ESPN in 2003; however, the league folded before ever staging any events.

In addition to college sports, Raycom has also produced preseason games for various National Football League teams. Through either Raycom Sports or Tupelo Raycom, it has produced games for the Carolina Panthers, New York Giants (since 2010), New Orleans Saints (since 2015: team flagship WVUE was owned by a group led by Saints owner Tom Benson and operated by Raycom, and was subsequently acquired by Raycom outright) and the Atlanta Falcons (since 2017).

=== Current taped programming ===
- Havoline Football Saturdays in the South
- Kings of the Court

Preceded by Lincoln Financial Sports	Syndication Rightsholder to Southeastern Conference football and men's basketball 2008–2009	Succeeded by ESPN Plus (under SEC TV branding)
Preceded by MetroSports, Inc.	Syndication Rightsholder to Atlantic Coast Conference men's basketball 1982–present (co-produced with Jefferson Pilot Sports/Lincoln Financial Sports 1982–2007)	Succeeded by ESPN (under ACC Network branding beginning in August 2019)
Preceded by Jefferson Pilot Sports	Syndication Rightsholder to Atlantic Coast Conference football 2005–2019 (produced in association with Lincoln Financial Sports 2006–2007)	Succeeded by ESPN (under ACC Network branding beginning in August 2019)
Preceded by Lorimar Sports Network	Syndication rights holder to Metro Conference basketball 1985–1995	Succeeded by None (Metro Conference merged with Great Midwest Conference to create Conference USA)
Preceded by Rassmussen Communications Management (RCM Sports)	Syndication Rightsholder to Big Ten Conference men's basketball 1989–1995	Succeeded by ESPN Plus
