= 1984 NCAA Division I men's basketball tournament =

Edition of USA college basketball tournament

- Season: 1983–84
- Teams: 53
- Finals site: Kingdome, Seattle, Washington
- Champions: Georgetown Hoyas (1st title, 3rd title game, 4th Final Four)
- Runner-up: Houston Cougars (2nd title game, 5th Final Four)
- Semifinalists: Kentucky Wildcats (9th Final Four); Virginia Cavaliers (2nd Final Four)
- Winning coach: John Thompson (1st title)
- MOP: Patrick Ewing (Georgetown)
- Attendance: 397,481
- Top scorer: Roosevelt Chapman (Dayton) (105 points)

The 1984 NCAA Division I men's basketball tournament involved 53 schools playing in single-elimination play to determine the national champion of men's NCAA Division I college basketball. The 46th annual edition of the tournament began on March 13, 1984, and ended with the championship game on April 2, at the Kingdome in Seattle. A total of 52 games were played. This was the last tournament in which some teams earned first-round byes as the field expanded to 64 teams beginning in the 1985 tournament when each team played in the first round. It was also the second year with a preliminary round; preliminary games would not be played again until 2001.

Georgetown, coached by John Thompson, won the national title with an 84–75 victory in the final game over Houston, coached by Guy Lewis. Patrick Ewing of Georgetown was named the tournament's Most Outstanding Player. Thompson became the first African-American head coach to lead his team to any NCAA Division I title.

Georgetown reached the Final Four for the third time in school history and second time in three years to face Kentucky, a team that had never lost a national semifinal game and was led by the "Twin Towers", Sam Bowie and Melvin Turpin. Bowie and Turpin managed to get Ewing into foul trouble early, and with him on the bench and Reggie Williams shooting only 1-for-7 (14.3%) from the field during the game, the Wildcats raced out to a 27–15 lead with 3:06 left in the first half. After that, however, the Hoyas made a defensive stand still unequalled in college basketball: Kentucky scored only two more points in the first half; the Wildcats also did not score in the first 9 minutes 55 seconds of the second half, missing their first 12 shots and after that shooting 3-for-21 (14.3%) during the remainder of the game. Overall, Kentucky shot 3-for-33 (9.1 percent) from the field during the second half. Although he played for only 17 minutes and suffered a season-ending foot injury in the second half, Gene Smith had one of the best defensive games of his career. Bowie and Turpin finished the game a combined 5-for-21, Wingate scored 12 points and held Kentucky's Jim Master to 2-for-7 (28.6%) shooting from the field, Michael Jackson scored 12 points and pulled down a career-high 10 rebounds, and Georgetown won 53–40 to advance to the national final for the third time in school history and second time in three years.

In the first national semifinal, Houston, playing in its third consecutive Final Four, edged Virginia, which reached the Final Four as a No. 7 seed in the East region, 49–47. The Cavaliers reached the national semifinals despite the graduation of four-time All-American Ralph Sampson the previous season. Coincidentally, Houston's All-America center, Akeem Olajuwon, would soon become Sampson's teammate with the Houston Rockets.

In the NCAA final, Georgetown faced Houston on April 2. Reggie Williams demonstrated his true potential for the first time, putting in a strong defensive performance and shooting 9-for-18 (50.0%) from the field with 19 points and seven rebounds in the game, while David Wingate scored 16 points and Ewing managed 10 points and nine rebounds. Jackson scored 11 points and had six assists, two of which set up Ewing and Michael Graham for decisive baskets late in the game. The game was decided well before the final whistle, and the Hoyas won the school's first national championship 84–75. Late in the game, with Georgetown enjoying a comfortable lead, Thompson began to pull starters out and give bench players some time on the court; the game's enduring image came when senior guard Fred Brown came out of the game. Two years earlier, Brown had mistakenly passed the ball to North Carolina's James Worthy in the last seconds of the 1982 championship game, ruining Georgetown's chances for a final game-winning shot and allowing North Carolina to take the national championship, and cameras had captured Thompson consoling a devastated Brown with a hug as the Tar Heels celebrated. As Brown left the 1984 championship game, cameras caught Brown and Thompson again embracing on the sideline, this time to celebrate a victory.

== Schedule and venues ==
1984 sites for play-in (orange) and first and second (green) rounds
1984 Regionals (blue) and Final Four (red)

The following are the sites that were selected to host each round of the 1984 tournament, and their host(s):

Opening Round

- March 13
  - East/West Regions
    - Palestra, Philadelphia, Pennsylvania (Hosts: University of Pennsylvania, Temple University)
  - Mideast/Midwest Regions
    - University of Dayton Arena, Dayton, Ohio (Host: University of Dayton)

First/Second Rounds

- March 15 and 17
  - East Region
    - Charlotte Coliseum, Charlotte, North Carolina (Host: University of North Carolina at Charlotte)
  - Mideast Region
    - BJCC Coliseum, Birmingham, Alabama (Host: Southeastern Conference)
  - Midwest Region
    - Mid-South Coliseum, Memphis, Tennessee (Host: Memphis State University)
  - West Region
    - Special Events Center, Salt Lake City, Utah (Host: University of Utah)
- March 16 and 18
  - East Region
    - Brendan Byrne Arena, East Rutherford, New Jersey (Host: Seton Hall University)
  - Mideast Region
    - MECCA Arena, Milwaukee, Wisconsin (Hosts: University of Wisconsin-Milwaukee, Marquette University)
  - Midwest Region
    - Bob Devaney Sports Center, Lincoln, Nebraska (Host: University of Nebraska–Lincoln)
  - West Region
    - Beasley Coliseum, Pullman, Washington (Host: Washington State University)

Regional semifinals and finals (Sweet Sixteen/Elite Eight)

- March 22 and 24
  - East Regional, Omni Coliseum, Atlanta, Georgia (Host: Georgia Tech)
  - Mideast Regional, Rupp Arena, Lexington, Kentucky (Host: University of Kentucky)
- March 23 and 25
  - Midwest Regional, St. Louis Arena, St. Louis, Missouri (Host: Missouri Valley Conference)
  - West Regional, Pauley Pavilion, Los Angeles, California (Host: UCLA)

National semifinals and championship (Final Four and championship)

- March 31 and April 2
  - Kingdome, Seattle, Washington (Host: University of Washington)

== Teams ==
Region	Seed	Team	Coach	Conference	Finished	Final Opponent	Score
East
East	1	North Carolina	Dean Smith	ACC	Sweet Sixteen	4 Indiana	L 72–68
East	2	Arkansas	Eddie Sutton	Southwest	Round of 32	7 Virginia	L 53–51
East	3	Syracuse	Jim Boeheim	Big East	Sweet Sixteen	7 Virginia	L 63–55
East	4	Indiana	Bob Knight	Big Ten	Regional Runner-up	7 Virginia	L 50–48
East	5	Auburn	Sonny Smith	SEC	Round of 48	12 Richmond	L 72–71
East	6	VCU	J. D. Barnett	Sun Belt	Round of 32	3 Syracuse	L 78–63
East	7	Virginia	Terry Holland	ACC	National semifinals	2 Houston	L 49–47
East	8	Temple	John Chaney	Atlantic 10	Round of 32	1 North Carolina	L 77–66
East	9	St. John's	Lou Carnesecca	Big East	Round of 48	8 Temple	L 65–63
East	10	Iona	Pat Kennedy	MAAC	Round of 48	7 Virginia	L 58–57
East	11	Long Island	Paul Lizzo	ECAC Metro	Preliminary Round	11 Northeastern	L 90–87
East	11	Northeastern	Jim Calhoun	ECAC North	Round of 48	6 VCU	L 70–69
East	12	Richmond	Dick Tarrant	ECAC South	Round of 32	4 Indiana	L 75–67
East	12	Rider	John Carpenter	East Coast	Preliminary Round	12 Richmond	L 89–65
Mideast
Mideast	1	Kentucky	Joe B. Hall	SEC	National semifinals	1 Georgetown	L 53–40
Mideast	2	Illinois	Lou Henson	Big Ten	Regional Runner-up	1 Kentucky	L 54–51
Mideast	3	Maryland	Lefty Driesell	ACC	Sweet Sixteen	2 Illinois	L 72–70
Mideast	4	Tulsa	Nolan Richardson	Missouri Valley	Round of 32	5 Louisville	L 69–67
Mideast	5	Louisville	Denny Crum	Metro	Sweet Sixteen	1 Kentucky	L 72–67
Mideast	6	Oregon State	Ralph Miller	Pacific-10	Round of 48	11 West Virginia	L 64–62
Mideast	7	Villanova	Rollie Massimino	Big East	Round of 32	2 Illinois	L 64–56
Mideast	8	BYU	LaDell Andersen	WAC	Round of 32	1 Kentucky	L 93–68
Mideast	9	UAB	Gene Bartow	Sun Belt	Round of 48	8 BYU	L 84–68
Mideast	10	Marshall	Rick Huckabay	Southern	Round of 48	7 Villanova	L 84–72
Mideast	11	West Virginia	Gale Catlett	Atlantic 10	Round of 32	3 Maryland	L 102–77
Mideast	12	Morehead State	Wayne Martin	Ohio Valley	Round of 48	5 Louisville	L 72–59
Mideast	12	North Carolina A&T	Don Corbett	MEAC	Preliminary Round	12 Morehead State	L 70–69
Midwest
Midwest	1	DePaul	Ray Meyer	Independent	Sweet Sixteen	4 Wake Forest	L 73–71
Midwest	2	Houston	Guy Lewis	Southwest	Runner Up	1 Georgetown	L 84–75
Midwest	3	Purdue	Gene Keady	Big Ten	Round of 32	6 Memphis State	L 66–48
Midwest	4	Wake Forest	Carl Tacy	ACC	Regional Runner-up	2 Houston	L 68–63
Midwest	5	Kansas	Larry Brown	Big Eight	Round of 32	4 Wake Forest	L 69–59
Midwest	6	Memphis State (Vacated)	Dana Kirk	Metro	Sweet Sixteen	2 Houston	L 78–71
Midwest	7	Fresno State	Boyd Grant	Pacific Coast	Round of 48	10 Louisiana Tech	L 66–56
Midwest	8	Illinois State	Bob Donewald	Missouri Valley	Round of 32	1 DePaul	L 75–61
Midwest	9	Alabama	Wimp Sanderson	SEC	Round of 48	8 Illinois State	L 49–48
Midwest	10	Louisiana Tech	Andy Russo	Southland	Round of 32	2 Houston	L 77–69
Midwest	11	Oral Roberts	Dick Acres	Midwestern City	Round of 48	6 Memphis State	L 92–83
Midwest	12	Alcorn State	Davey Whitney	SWAC	Round of 48	5 Kansas	L 57–56
Midwest	12	Houston Baptist	Gene Iba	Trans America	Preliminary Round	12 Alcorn State	L 79–60
West
West	1	Georgetown	John Thompson	Big East	Champion	2 Houston	W 84–75
West	2	Oklahoma	Billy Tubbs	Big Eight	Round of 32	10 Dayton	L 89–85
West	3	Duke	Mike Krzyzewski	ACC	Round of 32	6 Washington	L 80–78
West	4	UTEP	Don Haskins	WAC	Round of 32	5 UNLV	L 73–60
West	5	UNLV	Jerry Tarkanian	Pacific Coast	Sweet Sixteen	1 Georgetown	L 62–48
West	6	Washington	Marv Harshman	Pacific-10	Sweet Sixteen	10 Dayton	L 64–58
West	7	LSU	Dale Brown	SEC	Round of 48	10 Dayton	L 74–66
West	8	Miami (OH)	Darrell Hedric	MAC	Round of 48	9 SMU	L 83–69
West	9	SMU	Dave Bliss	Southwest	Round of 32	1 Georgetown	L 37–36
West	10	Dayton	Don Donoher	Independent	Regional Runner-up	1 Georgetown	L 61–49
West	11	Nevada	Sonny Allen	Big Sky	Round of 48	6 Washington	L 64–54
West	12	Princeton	Pete Carril	Ivy League	Round of 48	5 UNLV	L 68–56
West	12	San Diego	Jim Brovelli	West Coast	Preliminary Round	12 Princeton	L 65–56

== Bracket ==
* – Denotes overtime period

=== Preliminary round ===
East #11 Seed – Philadelphia, Pennsylvania
11	Northeastern	90
11	Long Island	87

East #12 Seed – Philadelphia, Pennsylvania
12	Richmond	89
12	Rider	65

Mideast #12 Seed – Dayton, Ohio
12	Morehead State	70
12	North Carolina A&T	69

Midwest #12 Seed – Dayton, Ohio
12	Alcorn State	79
12	Houston Baptist	60

West #12 Seed – Philadelphia, Pennsylvania
12	Princeton	65
12	San Diego	56

=== East Regional – Atlanta, Georgia ===
First round
8	Temple	65
9	St. John's	63
5	Auburn	71
12	Richmond	72
6	VCU	70
11	Northeastern	69
7	Virginia	58
10	Iona	57

Quarter-finals
8	Temple	66
1	North Carolina	77
4	Indiana	75
12	Richmond	67
6	VCU	63
3	Syracuse	78
2	Arkansas	51*
7	Virginia	53

Regional semifinals
1	North Carolina	68
4	Indiana	72
3	Syracuse	55
7	Virginia	63

Regional Finals
4	Indiana	48
7	Virginia	50

=== Midwest Regional – St. Louis, Missouri ===
First round
8	Illinois State	49
9	Alabama	48
5	Kansas	57
12	Alcorn State	56
6	Memphis State#	92
11	Oral Roberts	83
7	Fresno State	56
10	Louisiana Tech	66

Quarter-finals
8	Illinois State	61
1	DePaul	75
4	Wake Forest	69
5	Kansas	59
6	Memphis State#	66
3	Purdue	48
2	Houston	77
10	Louisiana Tech	69

Regional semifinals
1	DePaul	71*
4	Wake Forest	73
6	Memphis State#	71
2	Houston	78

Regional Finals
4	Wake Forest	63
2	Houston	68

# - Memphis State was forced to vacate its NCAA tournament appearance after a massive gambling scandal and criminal investigation into head coach Dana Kirk. Unlike forfeiture, a vacated game does not result in the other school being credited with a win, only with Memphis removing the wins from its own record.

=== Mideast Regional – Lexington, Kentucky ===
First round
8	BYU	84
9	UAB	68
5	Louisville	72
12	Morehead State	59
6	Oregon State	62
11	West Virginia	64
7	Villanova	84
10	Marshall	72

Quarter-finals
8	BYU	68
1	Kentucky	93
4	Tulsa	67
5	Louisville	69
11	West Virginia	77
3	Maryland	102
2	Illinois	64
7	Villanova	56

Regional semifinals
1	Kentucky	72
5	Louisville	67
3	Maryland	70
2	Illinois	72

Regional Finals
1	Kentucky	54
2	Illinois	51

=== West Regional – Los Angeles ===
First round
8	Miami (OH)	69
9	SMU	83
5	UNLV	68
12	Princeton	56
6	Washington	64
11	Nevada	54
7	LSU	66
10	Dayton	74

Quarter-finals
9	SMU	36
1	Georgetown	37
4	UTEP	60
5	UNLV	73
6	Washington	80
3	Duke	78
2	Oklahoma	85
10	Dayton	89

Regional semifinals
1	Georgetown	62
5	UNLV	48
6	Washington	58
10	Dayton	64

Regional Finals
1	Georgetown	61
10	Dayton	49

=== Final Four ===
National semifinals
E7	Virginia	47*
MW2	Houston	49
ME1	Kentucky	40
W1	Georgetown	53

National Championship Game
W1	Georgetown	84
MW2	Houston	75

==== Championship game ====
CBS

April 2

Box Score

Houston 75, Georgetown 84
Scoring by half: 30–40, 45–44
Pts: Franklin 21; Rebs: Olajuwon 9 Asts: Franklin 9	Pts: Williams 19; Rebs: Ewing 9 Asts: Jackson 6

Attendance: 38,471

== Broadcast information ==
=== Television ===
CBS Sports

- Brent Musburger served as Studio Host
- Gary Bender and Billy Packer – first round (Dayton-LSU) at Salt Lake City, Utah; Second Round at Charlotte, North Carolina (North Carolina–Temple, Indiana–Richmond) and Lincoln, Nebraska (DePaul–Illinois State, Wake Forest–Kansas); East Regional semifinal (North Carolina–Indiana) and Regional Final at Atlanta, Georgia; West Regional Final at Los Angeles, California; Final Four at Seattle, Washington
- Verne Lundquist and Steve Grote – second round at Memphis, Tennessee (Houston–Louisiana Tech, Memphis State–Purdue) and Milwaukee, Wisconsin (Tulsa–Louisville, Illinois–Villanova); Midwest Regional semifinal (DePaul–Wake Forest) and Regional Final at St. Louis, Missouri
- Frank Glieber and Larry Conley – first (Miami of Ohio–SMU) and second (Georgetown–SMU, Duke–Washington) rounds at Pullman, Washington; Mideast Regional Final at Lexington, Kentucky
- Dick Stockton and Bill Raftery – second round at East Rutherford, New Jersey (Arkansas–Virginia, Syracuse–VCU); West Regional semifinal (Georgetown–UNLV) at Los Angeles, California
- Frank Herzog and James Brown – second round at Birmingham, Alabama (Kentucky–Brigham Young, Maryland–West Virginia)
- Tim Ryan and Lynn Shackelford – second round at Salt Lake City, Utah (Oklahoma–Dayton, UTEP–UNLV)

ESPN/NCAA Productions

- Bob Ley served as Studio host and Dick Vitale as Studio analyst
- Jim Thacker and Irv Brown – East Regional semifinal (Syracuse–Virginia) at Atlanta, Georgia
- Tom Hammond and Larry Conley – preliminary round at Dayton, Ohio; Mideast Regional semifinals at Lexington, Kentucky
- Fred White and Gary Thompson – Midwest Regional semifinal (Houston–Memphis State) at St. Louis, Missouri
- Mike Walden and Bill Raftery – West Regional semifinal (Washington–Dayton) at Los Angeles, California
- Jim Thacker and Jeff Mullins – first round at Charlotte, North Carolina (Temple–St. John's, Auburn–Richmond)
- Jim Thacker and Bill Raftery – first round at East Rutherford, New Jersey (VCU–Northeastern, Virginia–Iona)
- Fred White and Irv Brown – first round at Birmingham, Alabama (Oregon State–West Virginia, Brigham Young–UAB)
- Tom Hammond and Wayne Larrivee – first round at Milwaukee, Wisconsin (Louisville–Morehead State, Villanova–Marshall)
- John Sanders and Joe Dean – first round at Memphis, Tennessee (Fresno State–Louisiana Tech, Memphis State–Oral Roberts)
- Frank Fallon and Gary Thompson – first round at Lincoln, Nebraska (Illinois State–Alabama, Kansas–Alcorn State)
- Mike Walden and Larry Conley – first round at Pullman, Washington (Washington–Nevada)
- John Sanders and Bill Raftery – preliminary round at Philadelphia, Pennsylvania

=== Local radio ===
Teams	Flagship station	Play-by-play announcer	Color analyst(s)
Georgetown	WWDC (Georgetown)	Rich Chvotkin	John Blake
Kansas	KLWN-AM (Lawrence)	Max Falkenstein	Bob Davis
Kentucky	WHAS-AM (Louisville)	Cawood Ledford	
LSU	WWL-AM (New Orleans)	Jim Hawthorne	

== See also ==
- 1984 NAIA men's basketball tournament
- 1984 National Invitation Tournament
- 1984 NCAA Division I women's basketball tournament
- 1984 NCAA Division II men's basketball tournament
- 1984 NCAA Division III men's basketball tournament
- NAIA Women's Basketball Championships
- National Women's Invitational Tournament
- NCAA Division II women's basketball tournament
- NCAA Division III women's basketball tournament
