= 1983–84 St. John's Redmen basketball team =

American college basketball season

1983–84 St. John's Redmen men's basketball

Lapchick Memorial Champions

1984 NCAA tournament, First round
- Conference: Big East Conference (1979–2013)
- Record: 18–12 (8–8 Big East)
- Head coach: Lou Carnesecca
- Assistant coaches: Brian Mahoney; Al LoBalbo; Ron Rutledge
- Home arena: Alumni Hall; Madison Square Garden

1983–84 Big East men's basketball standings
	Conf.				Overall
Team	W		L	PCT	W		L	PCT
No. 2 Georgetown†	14	–	2	.875	34	–	3	.919
No. 18 Syracuse	12	–	4	.750	23	–	9	.719
Villanova	12	–	4	.750	19	–	12	.613
Boston College	8	–	8	.500	18	–	12	.600
St. John's	8	–	8	.500	18	–	12	.600
Pittsburgh	6	–	10	.375	18	–	13	.581
Connecticut	5	–	11	.313	13	–	15	.464
Providence	5	–	11	.313	15	–	14	.517
Seton Hall	2	–	14	.125	9	–	19	.321
† 1984 Big East tournament winner As of April 2, 1984; Rankings from AP Poll

The 1983–84 St. John's Redmen basketball team represented St. John's University during the 1983–84 NCAA Division I men's basketball season. The team was coached by Lou Carnesecca in his sixteenth year at the school. St. John's home games are played at Alumni Hall and Madison Square Garden and the team is a member of the Big East Conference.

== Roster ==
1983–84 St. John's Red Storm men's basketball team
Players
Coaches

Pos.	#	Name	Height	Weight	Year	Previous school	Hometown
G/F	-	Ron Rowan (redshirt)	6 ft 4 in (1.93 m)	200 lb (91 kg)	Jr	Beaver Falls/Notre Dame	Beaver Falls, PA
G	12	Greg Laskow	6 ft 4 in (1.93 m)	170 lb (77 kg)	Fr	St. Francis Prep	Woodside, NY
G	13	Mark Jackson	6 ft 3 in (1.91 m)	195 lb (88 kg)	Fr	Bishop Loughlin	Brooklyn, NY
G	15	Rob James	6 ft 4 in (1.93 m)	190 lb (86 kg)	So	Long Island Lutheran	Hempstead, NY
G/F	20	Chris Mullin	6 ft 6 in (1.98 m)	205 lb (93 kg)	Jr	Power Memorial/Xaverian	Brooklyn, NY
F/C	22	Jeff Allen (C)	6 ft 10 in (2.08 m)	235 lb (107 kg)	RS Sr	Norwalk/Rutgers	Norwalk, CT
C	23	Bill Wennington	7 ft 0 in (2.13 m)	245 lb (111 kg)	Jr	Long Island Lutheran	Wheatley Heights, NY
G	24	Mike Moses	5 ft 11 in (1.8 m)	160 lb (73 kg)	RS Jr	Tolentine/Florida	New York, NY
G/F	30	Willie Glass	6 ft 5 in (1.96 m)	205 lb (93 kg)	Fr	Atlantic City	Atlantic City, NJ
F	33	Ron Stewart	6 ft 8 in (2.03 m)	212 lb (96 kg)	Jr	Brentwood	Brentwood, NY
F	42	Mike Feigenbaum	6 ft 6 in (1.98 m)	205 lb (93 kg)	RS Sr	Lawrence/Ohio/Wagner	Cedarhurst, NY
G/F	43	Jim Sasko	6 ft 4 in (1.93 m)	200 lb (91 kg)	Sr	Plainedge	Massapequa, NY
G	44	Bob Antonelli	6 ft 3 in (1.91 m)	170 lb (77 kg)	Jr	Nanticoke/Wilkes	Nanticoke, PA
F/C	52	Robert Cornegy (redshirt)	6 ft 11 in (2.11 m)	210 lb (95 kg)	Fr	Andrew Jackson	Cambria Heights, NY

Head coach

- Lou Carnesecca (St. John's, '50)

Assistant coach(es)

- Brian Mahoney
- Al LoBalbo
- Ron Rutledge

Legend

- (C) Team captain
- (S) Suspended
- (I) Ineligible
- (W) Walk-on
- Injured
- Current redshirt

== Schedule and results ==
Date time, TV	Rank^{#}	Opponent^{#}	Result	Record	Site city, state
Regular season
11/25/83*		Siena; Lapchick Tournament Opening Round	W 73-40	1-0	Alumni Hall; Queens, NY
11/26/83*		Canisius; Lapchick Tournament Championship	W 71-45	2-0	Alumni Hall; Queens, NY
12/03/83*	No. 19	Columbia	W 78-58	3-0	Alumni Hall; Queens, NY
12/11/83*	No. 16	U.S. International	W 78-58	4-0	Alumni Hall; Queens, NY
12/13/83*	No. 13	Manhattan	W 62-39	5-0	Alumni Hall; Queens, NY
12/17/83*	No. 13	Wagner	W 89-60	6-0	Alumni Hall; Queens, NY
12/23/83*	No. 12	Niagara	W 89-71	7-0	Alumni Hall; Queens, NY
12/27/83*	No. 8	vs. Fordham; ECAC Holiday Festival Semifinal	W 56-52	8-0	Madison Square Garden; New York, NY
12/29/83*	No. 8	vs. No. 1 North Carolina; ECAC Holiday Festival Championship	L 51-64	8-1	Madison Square Garden; New York, NY
01/05/84*	No. 13	Rutgers	W 71-43	9-1	Madison Square Garden; New York, NY
01/07/84	No. 13	Providence	W 57-52	10-1 (1-0)	Alumni Hall; Queens, NY
01/10/84	No. 10	Connecticut	W 68-65	11-1 (2-0)	Alumni Hall; Queens, NY
01/14/84	No. 10	at No. 18 Boston College	L 67-69	11-2 (2-1)	Roberts Center; Chestnut Hill, MA
01/16/84	No. 10	at Pittsburgh	L 61-63 ^{OT}	11-3 (2-2)	Fitzgerald Field House; Pittsburgh, PA
01/21/84; 3:00 p.m., NBC	No. 14	No. 6 Georgetown	L 61-83	11-4 (2-3)	Madison Square Garden (15,901); New York, NY
01/24/84		at Seton Hall	W 63-62	12-4 (3-3)	Meadowlands Arena; East Rutherford, NJ
01/28/84		at No. 20 Syracuse	L 74-78 ^{OT}	12-5 (3-4)	Carrier Dome; Syracuse, NY
02/01/84		Villanova	L 63-64	12-6 (3-5)	Alumni Hall; Queens, NY
02/04/84*		at No. 2 DePaul	L 57-59 ^{OT}	12-7	Rosemont Horizon; Rosemont, IL
02/07/84		at Providence	L 60-65	12-8 (3-6)	Providence Civic Center; Providence, RI
02/11/84		at Connecticut	W 84-65	13-8 (4-6)	Hartford Civic Center; Hartford, CT
02/13/84		Boston College	W 68-65	14-8 (5-6)	Alumni Hall; Queens, NY
02/18/84		Pittsburgh	W 65-62	15-8 (6-6)	Alumni Hall; Queens, NY
02/21/84; 8:00 p.m., ESPN		at No. 2 Georgetown	W 75-71	16-8 (7-6)	Capital Centre (11,136); Landover, MD
02/25/84		Seton Hall	W 61-59 ^{OT}	17-8 (8-6)	Alumni Hall; Queens, NY
02/27/84		No. 16 Syracuse	L 81-82 ^{OT}	17-9 (8-7)	Alumni Hall; Queens, NY
03/03/84		at Villanova	L 72-73 ^{OT}	17-10 (8-8)	The Palestra; Philadelphia, PA
Big East tournament
03/08/84		vs. Boston College; Big East tournament quarterfinal	W 57-52	18-10	Madison Square Garden; New York, NY
03/09/84; 9:00 p.m., MetroSports	(5)	vs. (1) No. 2 Georgetown; Big East tournament semifinal	L 68-79	18-11	Madison Square Garden (19,591); New York, NY
NCAA tournament
03/15/84*	(9 E)	vs. (8 E) No. 20 Temple; NCAA First Round	L 63-65	18-12	Charlotte Coliseum; Charlotte, NC
*Non-conference game. ^{#}Rankings from AP Poll. (#) Tournament seedings in parentheses.

== Team players drafted into the NBA ==
Round	Pick	Player	NBA club
3	56	Jeff Allen	Kansas City Kings
