= 1983–84 Connecticut Huskies men's basketball team =

American college basketball season

1983–84 Connecticut Huskies men's basketball
- Conference: Big East Conference
- Record: 13–15 (5–11 Big East)
- Head coach: Dom Perno (7th season)
- Assistant coaches: Greg Ashford; Howie Dickenman; Mike McKay; Steve Siegrist
- Home arena: Hugh S. Greer Field House; Hartford Civic Center

1983–84 Big East men's basketball standings
	Conf.				Overall
Team	W		L	PCT	W		L	PCT
No. 2 Georgetown†	14	–	2	.875	34	–	3	.919
No. 18 Syracuse	12	–	4	.750	23	–	9	.719
Villanova	12	–	4	.750	19	–	12	.613
Boston College	8	–	8	.500	18	–	12	.600
St. John's	8	–	8	.500	18	–	12	.600
Pittsburgh	6	–	10	.375	18	–	13	.581
Connecticut	5	–	11	.313	13	–	15	.464
Providence	5	–	11	.313	15	–	14	.517
Seton Hall	2	–	14	.125	9	–	19	.321
† 1984 Big East tournament winner As of April 2, 1984; Rankings from AP Poll

The 1983–84 Connecticut Huskies men's basketball team represented the University of Connecticut in the 1983–84 collegiate men's basketball season. The Huskies completed the season with a 13–15 overall record. The Huskies were members of the Big East Conference where they finished with a 5–11 record. The Huskies played their home games at Hugh S. Greer Field House in Storrs, Connecticut and the Hartford Civic Center in Hartford, Connecticut and were led by seventh-year head coach Dom Perno.

== Schedule ==
Date time, TV	Rank^{#}	Opponent^{#}	Result	Record	Site (attendance) city, state
Regular Season
12/1/1983*		Yale	W 76–54	1–0	Hugh S. Greer Field House; Storrs, Connecticut
12/3/1983*		at Ohio State	L 67–74	1–1	St. John Arena; Columbus, Ohio
12/6/1983*		at Fairfield	W 77–70	2–1	Alumni Hall; Fairfield, Connecticut
12/8/1983*		U.S. International	W 98–80	3–1	Hugh S. Greer Field House; Storrs, Connecticut
12/10/1983*		Boston University	W 79–74	4–1	Hugh S. Greer Field House; Storrs, Connecticut
12/13/1983*		Brooklyn	W 75–47	5–1	Hugh S. Greer Field House; Storrs, Connecticut
12/15/1983*		at Massachusetts	L 65–67 ^{OT}	5–2	Curry Hicks Cage; Amherst, Massachusetts
12/28/1983*		Columbia; Connecticut Mutual Classic	W 80–65	6–2	Hartford Civic Center; Hartford, Connecticut
12/29/1983*		Arizona State; Connecticut Mutual Classic	W 66–60	7–2	Hartford Civic Center; Hartford, Connecticut
1/4/1984; 8:00 p.m.		No. 4 Georgetown; Rivalry	L 69–81	7–3 (0–1)	Hartford Civic Center (15,673); Hartford, Connecticut
1/7/1984		at Pittsburgh	W 79–58	8–3 (1–1)	Fitzgerald Field House; Pittsburgh, Pennsylvania
1/10/1984		at No. 10 St. John's	L 65–68	8–4 (1–2)	Carnesecca Arena; New York City, New York
1/14/1984		Seton Hall	W 76–68	9–4 (2–2)	Hugh S. Greer Field House; Storrs, Connecticut
1/18/1984		Syracuse; Rivalry	L 68–95	9–5 (2–3)	Hartford Civic Center; Hartford, Connecticut
1/21/1984		at Providence	W 70–67	10–5 (3–3)	Providence Civic Center; Providence, Rhode Island
1/25/1984*		New Hampshire	W 67–65	11–5	Hugh S. Greer Field House; Storrs, Connecticut
1/27/1984		Villanova	L 58–69	11–6 (3–4)	Hartford Civic Center; Hartford, Connecticut
1/31/1984		at Boston College	L 67–82	11–7 (3–5)	Roberts Center; Boston, Massachusetts
2/4/1984; 12:00 p.m., MetroSports		at No. 4 Georgetown; Rivalry	L 62–87	11–8 (3–6)	Capital Centre (11,721); Landover, Maryland
2/6/1984		Pittsburgh	L 72–75 ^{OT}	11–9 (3–7)	Hugh S. Greer Field House; Storrs, Connecticut
2/11/1984		St. John's	L 65–84	11–10 (3–8)	Hartford Civic Center; Hartford, Connecticut
2/15/1984		at Seton Hall	W 79–57	12–10 (4–8)	Brendan Byrne Arena; East Rutherford, New Jersey
2/18/1984		at Syracuse; Rivalry	L 85–87 ^{3OT}	12–11 (4–9)	Carrier Dome; Syracuse, New York
2/20/1984		Providence	W 62–59	13–11 (5–9)	Hugh S. Greer Field House; Storrs, Connecticut
2/25/1984*		at Holy Cross	L 73–82	13–12	Hart Center; Worcester, Massachusetts
2/28/1984		at Villanova	L 70–82	13–13 (5–10)	Jake Nevin Field House; Villanova, Pennsylvania
3/3/1984		Boston College	L 60–83	13–14 (5–11)	Hartford Civic Center; Hartford, Connecticut
Big East tournament
3/8/1984		vs. Syracuse; Quarterfinals/Rivalry	L 58–73	13–15	Madison Square Garden; New York City, New York
*Non-conference game. ^{#}Rankings from AP Poll. (#) Tournament seedings in parentheses. All times are in Eastern Time.

Schedule Source:
