= 1983–84 Syracuse Orangemen basketball team =

American college basketball season

1983–84 Syracuse Orangemen basketball

NCAA Tournament, Regional semifinals, L 55–63 vs. Virginia
- Conference: Big East Conference

Ranking
- Coaches: No. 16
- AP: No. 18
- Record: 23–9 (12–4 Big East)
- Head coach: Jim Boeheim (8th season)
- Assistant coach: Bernie Fine (8th season)
- Home arena: Carrier Dome

1983–84 Big East men's basketball standings
	Conf.				Overall
Team	W		L	PCT	W		L	PCT
No. 2 Georgetown†	14	–	2	.875	34	–	3	.919
No. 18 Syracuse	12	–	4	.750	23	–	9	.719
Villanova	12	–	4	.750	19	–	12	.613
Boston College	8	–	8	.500	18	–	12	.600
St. John's	8	–	8	.500	18	–	12	.600
Pittsburgh	6	–	10	.375	18	–	13	.581
Connecticut	5	–	11	.313	13	–	15	.464
Providence	5	–	11	.313	15	–	14	.517
Seton Hall	2	–	14	.125	9	–	19	.321
† 1984 Big East tournament winner As of April 2, 1984; Rankings from AP Poll

The 1983–84 Syracuse Orangemen men's basketball team represented Syracuse University during the 1983–84 college basketball season. The team finished with an overall record of 23–9 (12–4 Big East). They received at a large bid and were the #3 seed in the East Region. In their opening game Syracuse defeated VCU 78–63 but they lost in the second round to Virginia 63–55.

== Roster ==
1983–84 Syracuse Orange men's basketball team
Players
Coaches

Pos.	#	Name	Height	Weight	Year	Hometown
G	11	Greg Monroe	6 ft 3 in (1.91 m)	195 lb (88 kg)	Fr	Rochester, New York
SF	12	Rafael Addison	6 ft 7 in (2.01 m)	210 lb (95 kg)	So	Jersey City, New Jersey
F	25	Howard Triche	6 ft 5 in (1.96 m)	215 lb (98 kg)	Fr	Syracuse, New York
PG	31	Dwayne Washington	6 ft 2 in (1.88 m)	185 lb (84 kg)	Fr	Brooklyn, New York
PF	45	Wendell Alexis	6 ft 8 in (2.03 m)	210 lb (95 kg)	So	Queens, New York
F	50	Joey Kohm	6 ft 3 in (1.91 m)	205 lb (93 kg)	Fr	Ithaca, New York

Head coach

- Jim Boeheim (Syracuse)

Assistant coach(es)

- Bernie Fine (Syracuse)

Legend

- (C) Team captain
- (S) Suspended
- (I) Ineligible
- (W) Walk-on
- Injured
- Current redshirt

Roster
Last update: 2019-Mar-16

== Schedule ==
Date time, TV	Rank^{#}	Opponent^{#}	Result	Record	Site city, state
Regular season
November 26* no, no		Colgate	W 88–49	1-0	Carrier Dome; Syracuse, NY
November 29* no, no		Cornell	W 84–55	2-0	Carrier Dome; Syracuse, NY
December 3* no, no		Dusquesne; Carrier Classic	W 87–69	3-0	Carrier Dome; Syracuse, NY
December 4* no, no		Iona; Carrier Classic	W 109–92	4-0	Carrier Dome; Syracuse, NY
December 10* no, no		No. 1 North Carolina	L 64–87	4-1	Carrier Dome; Syracuse, NY
December 13* no, no		Utica	W 80–65	5-1	Carrier Dome; Syracuse, NY
December 17* no, no		at Marquette	L 68–79	5-2	Milwaukee Arena/MECCA; Milwaukee, WI
December 23* no, no		St. Bonaventure	W 71–62	6-2	Carrier Dome; Syracuse, NY
December 30 no, no		Seton Hall	W 79–74	7-2 (1-0)	Carrier Dome; Syracuse, NY
January 3 no, no		Villanova	W 79–70	8-2 (2-0)	Carrier Dome; Syracuse, NY
January 17* no, no		No. 17 Oklahoma	L 91–98	8-3 (2-0)	Carrier Dome; Syracuse, NY
January 11 no, no		at Seton Hall	W 93–65	9-3 (3-0)	Brendan Byrne Arena; East Rutherford, NJ
January 14 no, no		at Providence	W 70–62	10-3 (4-0)	Providence, RI
January 18 no, no		at Connecticut; Rivalry	W 95–68	11-3 (5-0)	Hartford Civic Center; Hartford, CT
January 21 no, no		No. 16 Boston College	W 75–73	12-3 (6-0)	Carrier Dome; Syracuse, NY
January 25 no, no	No. 20	at Pittsburgh	W 62–58	13-3 (7-0)	Pittsburgh, PA
January 28 no, no	No. 20	St. John's	W 78–74 ^{OT}	14-3 (8-0)	Carrier Dome; Syracuse, NY
January 30; 8:00 p.m., MetroSports/ESPN	No. 20	No. 4 Georgetown; Rivalry	L 67–80	14-4 (8-1)	Carrier Dome (30,758); Syracuse, NY
February 5 no, no	No. 13	at Villanova	L 75–77	14-5 (8-2)	Philadelphia, PA
February 11* no, no	No. 19	C.W. Post	W 103–86	15-5	Carrier Dome; Syracuse, NY
February 14 no, no	No. 16	Providence	W 89–64	16-5 (9-2)	Carrier Dome; Syracuse, NY
February 18 no, no	No. 16	Connecticut; Rivalry	W 87–85 ^{3OT}	17-5 (10-2)	Carrier Dome; Syracuse, NY
February 22 no, no	No. 16	at Boston College	L 88–90 ^{OT}	17-6 (10-3)	Chestnut Hill, MA
February 25 no, no	No. 16	Pittsburgh	W 66–65	18-6 (11-3)	Carrier Dome; Syracuse, NY
February 27 no, no	No. 16	at St. John's	W 82–81 ^{OT}	19-6 (12-3)	Queens, NY
February 29* no, no	No. 16	at Canisius	W 68–64	20-6	Buffalo, NY
March 3; 12:00 p.m., MetroSports	No. 16	at No. 4 Georgetown; Rivalry	L 71–88	20-7 (12-4)	Capital Centre (19,035); Landover, MD
Big East tournament
March 8* no, no		vs. Connecticut; Big East tournament • Quarterfinals/Rivalry	W 73–58	21-7	Madison Square Garden; New York, NY
March 9* no, no		vs. Villanova; Big East tournament • Semifinals	W 66–65	22-7	Madison Square Garden; New York, NY
March 10*; 7:00 p.m., MetroSports/ESPN	(2)	vs. (1) No. 2 Georgetown; Big East tournament • Final/Rivalry	L 71–82 ^{OT}	22-8	Madison Square Garden (19,591); New York, NY
NCAA tournament
March 18* no, no	No. 18	vs. VCU; NCAA tournament • Second Round	W 78–63	23-8	Brendan Byrne Arena; East Rutheford, NJ
March 22* no, NCAA	No. 18	vs. Virginia; NCAA Tournament • Regional semifinals	L 55–63	23-9	The Omni; Atlanta, GA
*Non-conference game. ^{#}Rankings from AP Poll. (#) Tournament seedings in parentheses.
