= Spingarn High School =

Coordinates: 38°53′58.3″N 76°58′15.3″W

Joel Elias Spingarn Senior High School
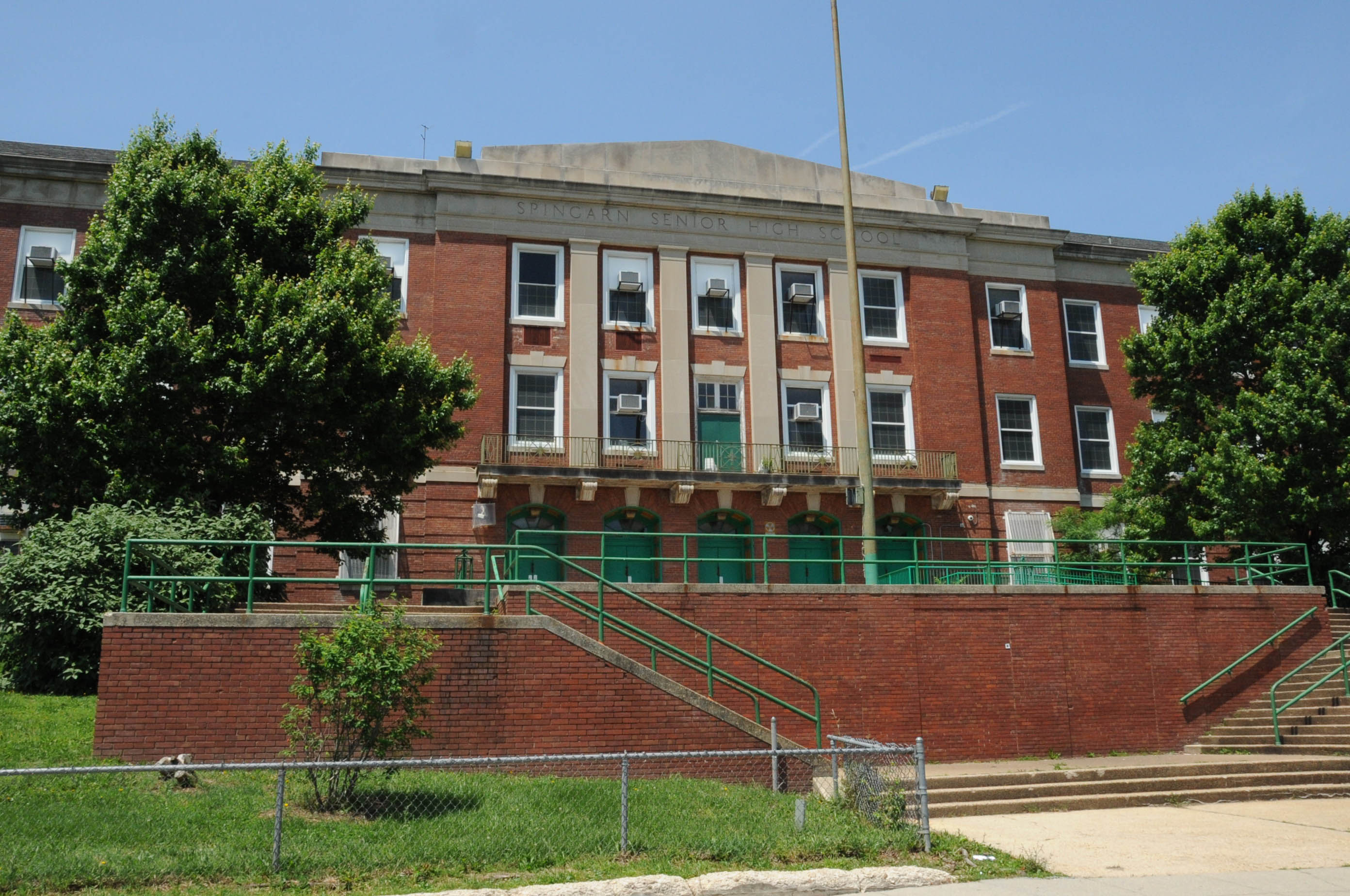
- Spingarn Senior High School located in the Carver Langston neighborhood of Washington, D.C.

Location
- 2500 Benning Road Northeast; Washington, DC 20002; United States

Information
- School type: Public high school
- Established: 1952
- Closed: 2013
- School district: District of Columbia Public Schools
- Grades: 9 to 12
- Campus type: Urban
- Colors: Green; Vegas gold
- Mascot: Mighty Green Wave
- Website: https://www.nps.gov/nr/feature/places/14000198.htm

Joel Elias Spingarn High School was a public high school located in the District of Columbia, United States. Founded in 1952, the school was the last segregated high school built in Washington, D.C. The school closed in 2013, and in 2023 the site began redevelopment to become a vocational school.

== History ==
Spingarn High School opened in 1952, as a new and modern segregated high school for African American students. It was the last segregated high school built in Washington, D.C., just two years before the U.S. Supreme Court ruled school segregation unconstitutional in Brown v. Board of Education.

The school is named after Joel Elias Spingarn (1875–1939) an American educator and literary critic who established the Spingarn Medal in 1913, awarded annually for outstanding achievement by an African American. The school's formal dedication ceremonies in December 1953 were attended by Spingarn's widow, Amy Spingarn, and by Spingarn Medal winners Paul Robeson and W. E. B. Du Bois. The principal speaker at the dedication was Howard University professor John Hope Franklin.

Purvis J. Wiliams was the first principal, serving until 1971. Under his leadership, Spingarn gained a reputation as one of the top black schools in the district. Spingarn's enrollment was around 1500 students, who were almost entirely black even after desegregation. Woodson Junior High School students were housed in Spingarn High School from 1962 to 1963.

Spingarn High School had one of D.C.'s most impressive basketball histories, producing well-known players such as Elgin Baylor, Dave Bing and Sherman Douglas. Spingarn won the City Title in 1961, 1980, 1985 and 2000. The school also played in nine District of Columbia Interscholastic Athletic Association (DCIAA) title games, winning for three consecutive years from 2000–2003.

=== Closure and redevelopment ===
Spingarn High School closed at the end of the 2012–13 school year due to low enrollment; that year, there were about 374 students. In May 2014, the school was added to the National Register of Historic Places.

In November 2023, Mayor Muriel Bowser announced that the city would renovate the Spingarn campus to house the D.C. Infrastructure Academy (DCIA), a vocational school founded in 2018. The DC Infrastructure Academy (DCIA) is under the Department of Employment Services (DOES). The site is undergoing extensive repairs and construction, with a plan to reopen in 2026.

== Notable alumni ==
- Elgin Baylor, NBA Hall of Fame basketball player and general manager
- Dave Bing, NBA Hall of Fame basketball player, Mayor of Detroit, business owner
- Warren Buck III, physics professor, first chancellor of University of Washington Bothell
- John B. Catoe Jr., former general manager of the Washington Metropolitan Area Transit Authority
- Hope Clarke, actress, dancer, choreographer, and director
- Robert Contee, retired D.C. police chief
- Sherman Douglas, professional basketball player
- Michael Graham, professional basketball player
- Mike Hinnant, professional football player
- Ollie Johnson, basketball player
- Earl Jones, professional basketball player
- John Kinard, founding director of the Anacostia Museum, a Smithsonian Institution museum
- Jamorko Pickett, professional basketball player
- Willie Royster, professional baseball player
- Stan Washington, professional basketball player
