= 1983–84 Pittsburgh Panthers men's basketball team =

American college basketball season

1983–84 Pittsburgh Panthers men's basketball

NIT, Quarterfinal Round, L 64–72 vs. Notre Dame
- Conference: Big East Conference (1979–2013)
- Record: 18–13 (6–10 Big East)
- Head coach: Roy Chipman (4th season)
- Assistant coaches: Reggie Warford (4th season); Joe DeGregorio (1st season); Jay Eck (1st season)
- Home arena: Fitzgerald Field House (Capacity: 4,122)

1983–84 Big East men's basketball standings
	Conf.				Overall
Team	W		L	PCT	W		L	PCT
No. 2 Georgetown†	14	–	2	.875	34	–	3	.919
No. 18 Syracuse	12	–	4	.750	23	–	9	.719
Villanova	12	–	4	.750	19	–	12	.613
Boston College	8	–	8	.500	18	–	12	.600
St. John's	8	–	8	.500	18	–	12	.600
Pittsburgh	6	–	10	.375	18	–	13	.581
Connecticut	5	–	11	.313	13	–	15	.464
Providence	5	–	11	.313	15	–	14	.517
Seton Hall	2	–	14	.125	9	–	19	.321
† 1984 Big East tournament winner As of April 2, 1984; Rankings from AP Poll

The 1983–84 Pittsburgh Panthers men's basketball team represented the University of Pittsburgh in the 1983–84 NCAA Division I men's basketball season. Led by head coach Roy Chipman, the Panthers finished with a record of 18–13. They were invited to the 1984 National Invitation Tournament where they lost in the quarterfinal round to Notre Dame.
