= 1983–84 Villanova Wildcats men's basketball team =

American college basketball season

1983–84 Villanova Wildcats men's basketball

NCAA men's Division I tournament, Second round
- Conference: Big East Conference
- Record: 19–12 (12–4 Big East)
- Head coach: Rollie Massimino (11th season)
- Assistant coaches: Mitch Buonaguro (7th season); Marty Marbach; Harry Booth
- Home arena: Villanova Field House

1983–84 Big East men's basketball standings
	Conf.				Overall
Team	W		L	PCT	W		L	PCT
No. 2 Georgetown†	14	–	2	.875	34	–	3	.919
No. 18 Syracuse	12	–	4	.750	23	–	9	.719
Villanova	12	–	4	.750	19	–	12	.613
Boston College	8	–	8	.500	18	–	12	.600
St. John's	8	–	8	.500	18	–	12	.600
Pittsburgh	6	–	10	.375	18	–	13	.581
Connecticut	5	–	11	.313	13	–	15	.464
Providence	5	–	11	.313	15	–	14	.517
Seton Hall	2	–	14	.125	9	–	19	.321
† 1984 Big East tournament winner As of April 2, 1984; Rankings from AP Poll

The 1983–84 Villanova Wildcats men's basketball team represented Villanova University during the 1983–84 NCAA Division I men's basketball season. The head coach was Rollie Massimino. The team played its home games at Villanova Field House in Villanova, Pennsylvania, and was a member of the Big East Conference. The team finished tied for second in the Big East regular season standings and reached the second round of the NCAA tournament before falling to Illinois. Villanova finished with a 19–12 record (12–4 Big East).

== Roster ==
1983–84 Villanova Wildcats men's basketball team
Players
Coaches

Pos.	#	Name	Height	Weight	Year	Hometown
C	41	Chuck Everson	7 ft 1 in (2.16 m)	255 lb (116 kg)	So	Brentwood, New York
G	20	Brian Harrington	6 ft 0 in (1.83 m)	165 lb (75 kg)	Jr	Pound Ridge, New York
G	13	Roland Massimino	5 ft 10 in (1.78 m)	165 lb (75 kg)	So	Villanova, Pennsylvania
G/F	33	Dwayne McClain	6 ft 6 in (1.98 m)	195 lb (88 kg)	Jr	Worcester, Massachusetts
G	22	Gary McLain	6 ft 0 in (1.83 m)	180 lb (82 kg)	Jr	Hempstead, New York
F/C	54	Ed Pinckney	6 ft 9 in (2.06 m)	205 lb (93 kg)	Jr	Bronx, New York
F	25	Steve Pinone	6 ft 4 in (1.93 m)	195 lb (88 kg)	Jr	Wethersfield, Connecticut
F	21	Harold Pressley	6 ft 7 in (2.01 m)	210 lb (95 kg)	So	Mystic, Connecticut
G	4	Dwight Wilbur	6 ft 2 in (1.88 m)	185 lb (84 kg)	So	Paterson, New Jersey

Head coach

- Rollie Massimino (Vermont)

Assistant coach(es)

- Mitch Buonaguro (Boston College)
- Marty Marbach (Saint Francis (PA))
- Harry Booth (Saint Joseph's)

Legend

- (C) Team captain
- (S) Suspended
- (I) Ineligible
- (W) Walk-on
- Injured
- Current redshirt

== Schedule and results ==
Date time, TV	Rank^{#}	Opponent^{#}	Result	Record	Site city, state
Regular season
Nov 30, 1983*		vs. Saint Joseph's	W 57–50	1–0	Palestra; Philadelphia, Pennsylvania
Dec 3, 1983*		Loyola (MD)	W 78–50	2–0	Villanova Field House; Philadelphia, Pennsylvania
Dec 10, 1983*		vs. Temple	L 89–92	2–1	Palestra; Philadelphia, Pennsylvania
Dec 17, 1983*		La Salle	L 80–90	2–2	Villanova Field House; Philadelphia, Pennsylvania
Dec 22, 1983*		vs. Samford	W 69–55	3–2	
Dec 23, 1983*		at Alabama-Birmingham	L 76–81 ^{3OT}	3–3	Birmingham-Jefferson Civic Center (5,885); Birmingham, Alabama
Dec 27, 1983*		at Jacksonville; Gator Bowl Tournament	L 63–67	3–4	Jacksonville Memorial Coliseum; Jacksonville, Florida
Dec 28, 1983*		vs. Auburn; Gator Bowl Tournament	L 83–95	3–5	Jacksonville Memorial Coliseum; Jacksonville, Florida
Jan 3, 1984		at Syracuse	L 70–79	3–6 (0–1)	Carrier Dome; Syracuse, New York
Jan 7, 1984		No. 17 Boston College	L 63–74	3–7 (0–2)	Villanova Field House; Philadelphia, Pennsylvania
Jan 9, 1984		Pittsburgh	W 74–61	4–7 (1–2)	Villanova Field House; Philadelphia, Pennsylvania
Jan 12, 1984; 6:00 p.m., ESPN		at No. 4 Georgetown	W 65–63 ^{2OT}	5–7 (2–2)	Capital Centre (9,032); Landover, Maryland
Big East tournament
Mar 8, 1984*		vs. Pittsburgh; Quarterfinals	W 75–65	18–10	Madison Square Garden; New York, New York
Mar 9, 1984*		vs. Syracuse; Semifinals	L 65–66	18–11	Madison Square Garden; New York, New York
NCAA tournament
Mar 16, 1984*	(7 ME)	vs. (10 ME) Marshall; First round	W 84–72	19–11	MECCA Arena (10,788); Milwaukee, Wisconsin
Mar 18, 1984*	(7 ME)	vs. (2 ME) No. 6 Illinois; Second round	L 56–64	19–12	MECCA Arena (10,788); Milwaukee, Wisconsin
*Non-conference game. ^{#}Rankings from AP poll. (#) Tournament seedings in parentheses. ME=Mideast.
