= Michael Graham (basketball) =

American basketball player (born 1963)

Personal information
- Born: July 14, 1963 (age 63) Washington, D.C., U.S.
- Listed height: 6 ft 9 in (2.06 m)
- Listed weight: 270 lb (122 kg)

Career information
- High school: Spingarn (Washington, D.C.)
- College: Georgetown (1983–1984)
- NBA draft: 1986: 4th round, 76th overall pick
- Drafted by: Seattle SuperSonics
- Position: Power forward

Career history
- 1986–1987: Albany Patroons
- 1986–1987: Charleston Gunners
- 1987–1988: Wyoming Wildcatters
- 1988–1989: Rochester Flyers
- 1989: Tulsa Fast Breakers
- 1993–1994: Columbus Horizon

Career highlights
- NCAA champion (1984); Fourth-team Parade All-American (1983)
- Stats at Basketball Reference

Michael Graham (born July 14, 1963) is an American former professional basketball player. He is known for his college career at Georgetown University, where he appeared on the cover of Sports Illustrated magazine after helping the Hoyas to the 1984 NCAA championship.

Graham, a 6'9" power forward from Spingarn High School in Washington, D.C., signed with future Hall of Fame coach John Thompson at Georgetown. As a freshman in 1983–84, Graham became a key player for the Hoyas. He provided rugged defense and rebounding, appearing in all but two of the team's 37 games – starting 17. While his regular season statistics were pedestrian, Graham became a key player for the Hoyas in their quest for a national championship. In the 1984 Final Four, Graham scored 22 points and grabbed 11 rebounds and led the Hoyas to a victory over the Houston Cougars for the national championship. In the championship game, Graham scored 14 points on 7–9 shooting and was one of two Georgetown players to be named to the All-Final Four team along with Most Outstanding Player Patrick Ewing. Following the championship win, Graham – whose fiery demeanor and shaved head were seen as personifying the Hoyas' aggressive playing style – appeared on the cover of Sports Illustrated magazine.

Following the championship season, Graham had academic difficulties and was suspended from the Georgetown team. He ultimately transferred to the University of the District of Columbia in an attempt to play Division II basketball, but ultimately declared for the 1986 NBA draft without playing a game for the Firebirds.

Graham was drafted by the Seattle SuperSonics in the fourth round of the draft (76th pick overall), but did not make the Sonics' final roster. He played several seasons in the Continental Basketball Association (CBA), for the Albany Patroons, Charleston Gunners, Wyoming Wildcatters, Rochester Flyers, Tulsa Fast Breakers and Columbus Horizon. In his four CBA seasons, Graham averaged 7.8 points and 6.6 rebounds per game. Graham also played in Europe and South America.
