= John Thompson (basketball) =

American college basketball coach (1941–2020)

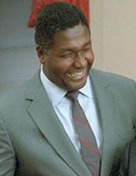
- Thompson in 1984

Personal information
- Born: September 2, 1941 Washington, D.C., U.S.
- Died: August 30, 2020 (aged 78) Arlington County, Virginia, U.S.
- Listed height: 6 ft 10 in (2.08 m)
- Listed weight: 225 lb (102 kg)

Career information
- High school: Archbishop Carroll (Washington, D.C.)
- College: Providence (1961–1964)
- NBA draft: 1964: 3rd round, 25th overall pick
- Drafted by: Boston Celtics
- Playing career: 1964–1966
- Position: Center
- Number: 18, 5
- Coaching career: 1966–1999

Career history

Playing
- 1964–1966: Boston Celtics

Career highlights
- As player: 2× NBA champion (1965, 1966); Honorable mention All-American – AP (1964); Second-team Parade All-American (1960); As coach: NCAA Division I tournament champion (1984); 3x NCAA Division I regional – Final Four (1982, 1984, 1985); 6× Big East tournament champion (1980, 1982, 1984, 1985, 1987, 1989); 5× Big East regular season champion (1980, 1984, 1987, 1989, 1992); 2× Big East 7 division champion (1996, 1997); 2× ECAC tournament Southern Region champion (1975, 1976); ECAC Tournament South-Upstate Region champion (1979); Henry Iba Award (1982); NABC Coach of the Year (1985); UPI Coach of the Year (1987); 3× Big East Coach of the Year (1980, 1987, 1992)
- Stats at NBA.com
- Stats at Basketball Reference

Career coaching record
- College: 596–239 (.714)
- Basketball Hall of Fame
- Collegiate Basketball Hall of Fame
Medals
Head Coach for United States
Men's basketball
Olympic Games
Bronze medal – third place	1988 Seoul	Team competition

John Robert Thompson Jr. (September 2, 1941 – August 30, 2020) was an American professional basketball player and college basketball coach for the Georgetown Hoyas men's team. He became the first African-American head coach to win a major collegiate championship in basketball when he led the Hoyas to the NCAA Division I national championship in 1984. Thompson was inducted into the Naismith Memorial Basketball Hall of Fame and National Collegiate Basketball Hall of Fame.

Thompson played college basketball for the Providence Friars and earned honorable mention All-American honors in 1964. He played for two seasons in the National Basketball Association (NBA) for the Boston Celtics, who won an NBA championship in both seasons. Thompson became a high school coach in Washington, D.C., before coaching Georgetown for 27 seasons. He worked as a radio and television sports commentator after his retirement from coaching. Thompson earned a master's degree in Counseling and Guidance at the University of the District of Columbia (UDC). He also served as an employee at the center for 4-H and Youth Development at UDC.

== Early life ==
Thompson was born and raised in Washington, D.C., and was a practicing Roman Catholic. As a child, his mother insisted on sending him to Catholic schools for the educational opportunities and academic challenges.

At Archbishop Carroll High School, Thompson emerged as a standout center, playing in three consecutive City Championship games (1958–60). In 1959, Carroll All-Mets Thompson, Monk Malloy, George Leftwich and Tom Hoover won over Cardozo 79–52. The next year, Thompson and Leftwich led the Lions over the Ollie Johnson/Dave Bing led Spingarn, 69–54. During his senior year, Thompson led Carroll to a 24–0 record, preserving their 48-game winning streak along the way. Carroll capped off the undefeated 1960 season with a 57–55 win over St Catherine's Angels of Racine, Wisconsin in the Knights of Columbus National Championship Tournament with Thompson scoring a team-high 15 points and adding 12 rebounds.

He was voted to the all-tournament team and was later named a second-team Parade All-American.

== Playing career ==
=== Providence College ===
After graduating from Archbishop Carroll, Thompson went to Providence College, where he played on the 1963 NIT Championship team with Ray Flynn, and was part of the first Providence NCAA tournament team in his senior year in 1964, when he received honorable mention from the Associated Press for its All-American team. Upon graduation, Thompson was the Friars' all-time leader in points, scoring average, and field goal percentage, and second in rebounds to former teammate Jim Hadnot.

=== National Basketball Association ===
He was selected in the third round of the 1964 NBA draft and played two seasons in the National Basketball Association (NBA) for the Boston Celtics from 1964 to 1966. At 6 ft 10 in (2.08 m) and 270 lb (120 kg), he backed up Bill Russell, the Celtics star center, en route to consecutive NBA championships. Nicknamed "the Caddy" for his secondary role to Russell, he averaged 3.5 points and 3.5 rebounds in 74 games played. Thompson was selected by the Chicago Bulls in the 1966 NBA expansion draft, but he decided to retire from playing instead of relocating to Chicago.

== Coaching career ==
=== Georgetown ===
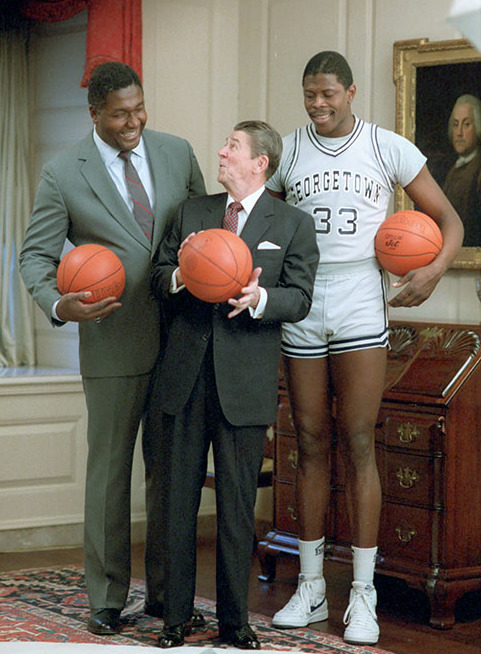
Thompson with President Ronald Reagan and Patrick Ewing after Georgetown won the 1984 national title

Thompson was a guidance counselor and head coach at St. Anthony High School in Washington, D.C. from 1966 to 1972, compiling a 122–28 record. He left St. Anthony for Georgetown University, who chose him over more experienced candidates Morgan Wootten and George Raveling.

Inheriting a Hoyas team which had been 3–23 the year before, Thompson led the Hoyas to a .500 record by his second season. By his third season in 1974–75, Georgetown qualified for the NCAA tournament for the first time since 1943. Over 27 years, Thompson's Hoyas went 596–239 (.714), running off a streak of 24 postseason appearances – 20 in the NCAA tournament and 4 in the NIT – including a 14-year streak of NCAA appearances from 1979 to 1992 that saw three Final Four appearances in 1982, 1984 and 1985. The 1984 squad, led by 7-foot (2.1 m) center Patrick Ewing, won the Division I national championship over Houston, and Thompson became the first African-American coach to lead his team to the title. Two years earlier, Thompson had become the first Black coach to advance their team to the Final Four. Georgetown missed repeating as champs in 1985, losing in the finals to underdog Villanova.

An imposing figure on the sidelines who towered over many opposing coaches and even players, Thompson was noted for a trademark white towel that he carried on his shoulder during the games, which he did as a tribute to his mother. He won seven Coach of the Year awards: Big East (1980, 1987, 1992), United States Basketball Writers Association (1982), The Sporting News (1984), National Association of Basketball Coaches (1985), and United Press International (1987). Thompson coached many notable players, including Ewing, Sleepy Floyd, Alonzo Mourning, Dikembe Mutombo, Allen Iverson and Victor Page. Under Thompson, 26 players were chosen in the NBA draft; eight were drafted in the first round, including two players selected first overall: Ewing and Iverson. Thompson also insisted on top academic performance from his players and maintained a 97% graduation rate among the team.

==== Confronting drug lord ====
In the late 1980s, Thompson got word that several of his players, including Alonzo Mourning, were associating with noted Washington, D.C. drug lord and avid Hoya fan Rayful Edmond III, whose crew was connected to at least forty homicides. At the height of his empire, Edmond became very friendly with several Hoyas players. When Thompson confirmed what was happening, he sent word through his sources to have Edmond meet him at his office at McDonough Gymnasium.

When Edmond arrived, Thompson was initially cordial, and informed Edmond that he needed to cease all contacts with his players post haste, specifically John Turner and Mourning, both of whom had befriended Edmond. When Edmond tried to assure him that his players were not involved in anything illegal, the 6'10" Thompson stood up and pointed his index finger between Edmond's eyes. Thompson, known for his volatility, quickly boiled over, and unleashed a profanity-laced tirade in which he told Edmond that he did not care about his crew's violent reputation or propensity to commit murder. Edmond had crossed a line with Thompson's players, and Thompson was not going to allow Edmond to destroy the players' lives.

At the publishing of his autobiography, however, it was revealed that the conversation between Edmond and Thompson was not as confrontational as once believed.

"A myth has grown about me threatening Rayful and ordering him to stay away from my players. Some people like to say I stood over him and pointed my finger in his face. That's nonsense. That myth is based on the perception of me as intimidating and a bully. Like when I argued with refs, I supposedly scared them.

Edmond never associated with another Hoyas player on a personal level, and Thompson was the only person to stand up to Edmond without consequence, initially causing some shock and surprise that there was no reprisal.

=== U.S. national team ===
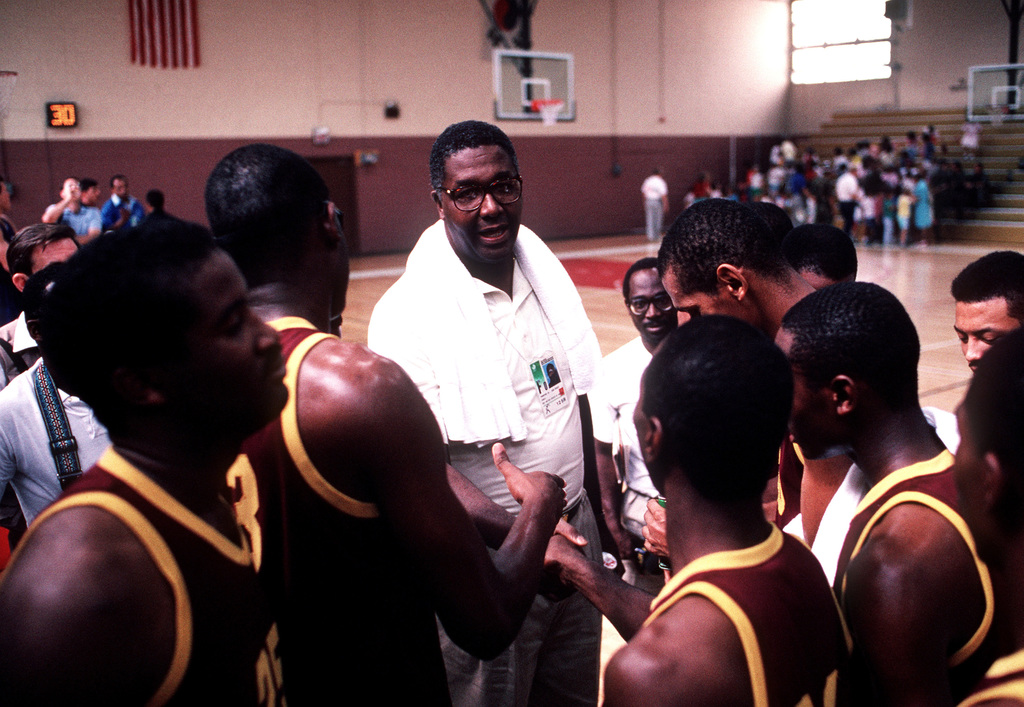
John Thompson speaks with US service members in South Korea

Thompson was an assistant coach for the U.S. national team on its gold medal-winning 1976 Olympic team. He was later the head coach of the 1988 Olympic team, the Americans' last fully collegiate squad. Although favored to win the international tournament, the United States was narrowly defeated by the all-professional and experienced Soviet Union in the semifinals 82–76, marking the first time the Americans did not reach the gold medal game. The United States won its final game against Australia to capture the bronze medal, the lowest finish by an American team for men's basketball.

=== Protest against Proposition 42 ===
On January 14, 1989, before the start of Georgetown's home game against Boston College, Thompson walked off the Capital Centre floor and turned coaching duties over to assistant Mike Riley. Thompson was protesting the NCAA's Proposition 42, which would have denied athletic scholarships to student athletes who failed to qualify academically under standards of the already in effect Proposition 48. Thompson expressed concerns that the proposal would leave many student athletes without a means of paying for their education, as well as what he felt would be the proposal's disproportionate impact on Black athletes.

=== Resignation ===
On January 8, 1999, Thompson announced his resignation as Georgetown's head coach, citing marriage problems. He was replaced by longtime assistant Craig Esherick. Thompson was inducted into the Naismith Memorial Basketball Hall of Fame on October 1, 1999.

Esherick was fired in 2004 and replaced by John Thompson III, Thompson's eldest son. At the time the elder Thompson was serving Georgetown in what Rev. Leo J. O'Donovan, university president, referred to as a "coach emeritus" position, assisting on academic, athletic, and community projects. John Thompson III coached Georgetown until 2017.

John Thompson Jr.'s younger son, Ronny Thompson, formerly an assistant coach at Georgetown, was the head coach at Ball State.

== Post-coaching career ==
After retiring from coaching, Thompson became the presidential consultant for urban affairs at Georgetown University, a basketball commentator for TNT, and host of a sports talk show, The John Thompson Show, on WTEM in Washington, D.C. He signed a lifetime contract with Clear Channel Radio and WTEM in 2006. Working with Rick Walker, Thompson remained on the show until 2012.

Thompson was scheduled to be on American Airlines Flight 77 on September 11, 2001, which was hijacked and crashed into the Pentagon in the September 11 attacks. He was scheduled to appear on Jim Rome's radio show in Los Angeles and wished to fly on September 11 and attend a friend's birthday party in Las Vegas on the 13th. After Rome's producer told Thompson that his plans would not work for the show, assuring him that he would be able to travel from Los Angeles to Las Vegas immediately after the show, he canceled his flight. Ten years later, on The Jim Rome Show, Thompson reunited with the producer who persuaded him not to take Flight 77.

Georgetown University's John R. Thompson Intercollegiate Athletic Center was completed in 2016. The lobby includes a statue of Thompson.

Thompson died at his home in Arlington County, Virginia on August 30, 2020, at the age of 78. Thompson's autobiography, I Came as a Shadow, was published posthumously in December 2020.

== Career statistics ==
Legend
GP	Games played	GS	Games started	MPG	Minutes per game
FG%	Field goal percentage	3P%	3-point field goal percentage	FT%	Free throw percentage
RPG	Rebounds per game	APG	Assists per game	SPG	Steals per game
BPG	Blocks per game	PPG	Points per game	**Bold**	Career high
†	Won an NBA championship

=== NBA ===
==== Regular season ====
Year	Team	GP	MPG	FG%	FT%	RPG	APG	PPG
1964–65†	Boston	**64**	**10.9**	.402	.590	**3.6**	**.3**	**3.6**
1965–66†	Boston	10	7.2	**.467**	**.667**	3.0	**.3**	3.2
Career		74	10.4	.410	.595	3.5	.3	3.5

==== Playoffs ====
Year	Team	GP	MPG	FG%	FT%	RPG	APG	PPG
1965†	Boston	**3**	**7.0**	**.286**	**1.000**	**4.0**	**.3**	**3.7**
1966†	Boston	**3**	3.7	.143	–	1.3	.0	.7
Career		6	5.3	.214	1.000	2.7	.2	2.2

== Head coaching record ==
Record table
Season	Team	Overall	Conference	Standing	Postseason
**Georgetown Hoyas** (NCAA University Division / Division I independent) (1972–1979)
1972–73	Georgetown	12–14			
1973–74	Georgetown	13–13			
1974–75	Georgetown	18–10	(Note: Although an independent, Georgetown participated from 1975 to 1979 in one of the regional end-of-season ECAC Tournaments organized by the Eastern College Athletic Conference – a loosely organized sports federation of Eastern colleges and universities – for ECAC members which played as independents during the regular season. Each of these regional tournaments provided its winner with an automatic bid to that year's NCAA tournament in the same manner as conference tournaments of conventional conferences. Georgetown played in the ECAC South Region Tournament from 1975 to 1977, winning it in 1975 and 1976, and in the ECAC South-Upstate Region Tournament in 1978 and 1979, winning it in 1979.)		NCAA Division I First Round
1975–76	Georgetown	21–7			NCAA Division I First Round
1976–77	Georgetown	19–9			NIT First Round
1977–78	Georgetown	23–8			NIT Fourth Place
1978–79	Georgetown	24–5			NCAA Division I First Round
**Georgetown Hoyas** (Big East Conference) (1979–1999)
1979–80	Georgetown	26–6	5–1	T–1st	NCAA Division I Elite Eight
1980–81	Georgetown	20–12	9–5	2nd	NCAA Division I First Round
1981–82	Georgetown	30–7	10–4	2nd	NCAA Division I Runner-up
1982–83	Georgetown	22–10	11–5	2nd	NCAA Division I Second Round
1983–84	Georgetown	34–3	14–2	1st	NCAA Division I champion
1984–85	Georgetown	35–3	14–2	2nd	NCAA Division I Runner-up
1985–86	Georgetown	24–8	11–5	3rd	NCAA Division I First Round
1986–87	Georgetown	29–5	12–4	T–1st	NCAA Division I Elite Eight
1987–88	Georgetown	20–10	9–7	2nd	NCAA Division I Second Round
1988–89	Georgetown	29–5	13–3	T–1st	NCAA Division I Elite Eight
1989–90	Georgetown	24–7	11–5	2nd	NCAA Division I Second Round
1990–91	Georgetown	19–13	8–8	4th	NCAA Division I Second Round
1991–92	Georgetown	22–10	10–6	T–1st	NCAA Division I Second Round
1992–93	Georgetown	20–13	8–10	5th	NIT Runner-up
1993–94	Georgetown	19–12	10–8	T–4th	NCAA Division I Second Round
1994–95	Georgetown	21–10	11–7	4th	NCAA Division I Sweet 16
1995–96	Georgetown	29–8	13–5	1st (BE 7)	NCAA Division I Elite Eight
1996–97	Georgetown	20–10	11–7	1st (BE 7)	NCAA Division I First Round
1997–98	Georgetown	16–15	6–12	T–5th (BE 7)	NIT Second Round
1998–99^{‡}	Georgetown	7–6 (Note: Thompson resigned at midseason on January 8, 1999. Craig Esherick immediately succeeded him as head coach. Esherick led the team to a regular season conference record of 6–12 and a seventh-place conference finish, a first-round loss in the 1999 National Invitation Tournament, and an overall record for of 15–16.)	0–4		
Georgetown:		596–239 (.714)	196–110 (.641)		
Total:		596–239 (.714)			
National champion Postseason invitational champion Conference regular season champion Conference regular season and conference tournament champion Division regular season champion Division regular season and conference tournament champion Conference tournament champion

== See also ==
- List of NCAA Division I men's basketball tournament Final Four appearances by coach
