= Metrosports =

Defunct American sports syndication network

- Title card from a 1984 broadcast
- Industry: Sports syndication
- Founded: 1972 in Rockville, Maryland
- Founders: Lenny Klompus, Marsha Cherner
- Defunct: March 15, 1985
- Fate: Chapter 11 bankruptcy

Metrosports was an American sports syndication network. Founded in Rockville, Maryland in 1972, they produced television and radio broadcasts of sports games, primarily college football and basketball, for various local stations. In 1984, they were acquired by Total Communications Systems (TCS) and became TCS/Metrosports. After failing to make payments to sports conferences and losing rights deals, TCS/Metrosports filed for bankruptcy in 1985.

== History ==
In 1972, Metrosports was incorporated under the name Metro Communications, Inc. in Rockville, Maryland. The company was founded by husband-and-wife Lenny Klompus and Marsha Cherner.

In 1984, the Washington Post called Metrosports "one of the nation's leading independent syndicators of college basketball games", citing its syndication deals with the Big East Conference and the Pacific-10 Conference.

After the U.S. Supreme Court made a decision in June 1984 voiding the NCAA's exclusive television contracts with CBS and ABC, schools and conferences were free to seek television deals with other broadcasters and syndicators. In the wake of this, Metrosports signed a $3 million rights deal with the Pacific-10 Conference. However, it only managed to pay $2.5 million, leading the Pac-10 to file suit for the remaining $500,000.

In April 1984, Metrosports was bought out by Total Communications Systems (TCS) and became TCS/Metrosports.

In August 1984, the athletic departments of Penn State, Notre Dame, West Virginia, Temple and Rutgers announced the formation of a National Independent Football Network in conjunction with TCS/Metrosports.

On January 31, 1985, the Big Ten Conference announced it was severing its rights deal with TCS/Metrosports due to non-payment.

On March 15, 1985, TCS/Metrosports filed for Chapter 11 bankruptcy.

== Notable on-air personalities ==
- Ray Scott, play by play (UCLA football, Big Eight basketball)
- Harry Kalas, play by play (Notre Dame football and basketball, Liberty Bowl 1981–1982, Aloha Bowl 1982 and 1984)
- Len Berman, play by play (Big East Conference basketball)
- Jim Thacker, play by play (ACC basketball 1981–82, Big Ten basketball 1983–85)
- Billy Packer, analyst (ACC basketball, 1981–82)
- Ray Lane color analyst (Big Ten Conference basketball)
- Mike Gorman play by play commentator (Big East Conference basketball)
- Sam Nover, play by play commentator (Eastern Independent football and 1984 Freedom Bowl)
- Bill Raftery, color analyst (Big East Conference basketball)
- Jack Snow, color analyst (1984 Aloha Bowl and 1984 Freedom Bowl)
- George Connor (Notre Dame football and basketball)
- Joe Buttita, color analyst (UCLA football)
- Gary Thompson, analyst (Big Eight basketball)
- Stan Savran, play by play (Penn State Football)
- Tom Hawkins, analyst (Notre Dame Basketball)
