= Michael Jackson (basketball) =

American basketball player (born 1964)

Personal information
- Born: July 13, 1964 (age 62) Fairfax, Virginia, U.S.
- Listed height: 6 ft 2 in (1.88 m)
- Listed weight: 183 lb (83 kg)

Career information
- High school: South Lakes (Reston, Virginia)
- College: Georgetown (1982–1986)
- NBA draft: 1986: 2nd round, 47th overall pick
- Drafted by: New York Knicks
- Playing career: 1987–1990
- Position: Point guard
- Number: 2

Career history
- 1987–1990: Sacramento Kings

Career highlights
- NCAA champion (1984); 2× Third-team All-Big East (1985, 1986)
- Stats at NBA.com
- Stats at Basketball Reference

Michael Derek Jackson (born July 13, 1964) is an American former professional basketball player who played in three NBA seasons for the Sacramento Kings from 1987 to 1990. A 6'2" guard from Georgetown University, Jackson was a member of the 1984 Hoyas team that won the Division I national championship and returned to the Final Four the following year.

Following his college career, Jackson was selected by the New York Knicks in the second round (47th pick overall) of the 1986 NBA draft. In his NBA career, Jackson played in 89 games, scored a total of 188 points, and had 198 assists. He led the Kings in assists in a number of games in the 1987–88 season. He was a member of Georgetown's 1984 National Championship team. After graduating with a degree in sociology in 1986, he was accepted to Harvard Kennedy School at Harvard University. Upon retirement, Jackson assumed management positions with the United States Olympic Committee and Turner Sports and served as the president of Yankees–Nets (currently known as YES Network). He worked in a number of executive positions at Nike, Inc, including vice president and general manager of global basketball from 2014 to 2016.

== Career statistics ==
Legend
GP	Games played	GS	Games started	MPG	Minutes per game
FG%	Field goal percentage	3P%	3-point field goal percentage	FT%	Free throw percentage
RPG	Rebounds per game	APG	Assists per game	SPG	Steals per game
BPG	Blocks per game	PPG	Points per game	**Bold**	Career high

=== NBA ===
==== Regular season ====
Year	Team	GP	GS	MPG	FG%	3P%	FT%	RPG	APG	SPG	BPG	PPG
1987–88	Sacramento	**58**	0	**13.1**	.374	.240	**.719**	**1.0**	**3.1**	**.3**	**.1**	**2.7**
1988–89	Sacramento	14	0	5.0	**.375**	.333	.500	.3	.8	.2	.0	1.5
1989–90	Sacramento	17	0	3.4	.273	**.500**	.500	.4	.5	**.3**	.0	.6
Career		89	0	10.0	.369	.273	.675	.8	2.2	.3	.1	2.1
