= 1986–87 Big East Conference men's basketball season =

American college basketball season

1986–87 Big East Conference Men's Basketball Season
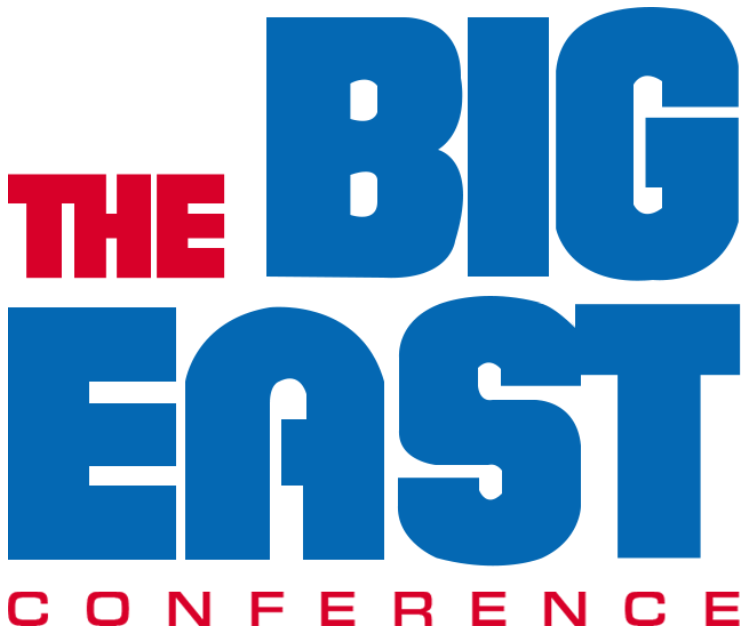
- League: NCAA Division I
- Sport: Basketball
- Duration: November 28, 1986 through March 8, 1987
- Teams: 9
- TV partner: ESPN

Regular Season
- Champion: Georgetown, Pittsburgh, and Syracuse (12–4)
- Season MVP: Reggie Williams – Georgetown

Tournament
- Champions: Georgetown
- Finals MVP: Reggie Williams – Georgetown

Basketball seasons
- 1985–86 1987–88

1986–87 Big East men's basketball standings
	Conf.				Overall
Team	W		L	PCT	W		L	PCT
No. 4 Georgetown†	12	–	4	.750	29	–	5	.853
No. 12 Pittsburgh	12	–	4	.750	25	–	8	.758
No. 10 Syracuse	12	–	4	.750	31	–	7	.816
Providence	10	–	6	.625	25	–	9	.735
St. John's	10	–	6	.625	21	–	9	.700
Villanova	6	–	10	.375	15	–	16	.484
Seton Hall	4	–	12	.250	15	–	14	.517
Boston College	3	–	13	.188	11	–	18	.379
Connecticut	3	–	13	.188	9	–	19	.321
† 1987 Big East tournament winner As of March 30, 1987; Rankings from AP Poll

The 1986–87 Big East Conference men's basketball season was the eighth in conference history, and involved its nine full-time member schools.

Georgetown, Pittsburgh, and Syracuse were the regular-season co-champions with identical records of (12–4). Georgetown won the Big East tournament championship. In the NCAA Tournament, Providence and Syracuse both reached the Final Four, and Syracuse was the national runner-up.

== Season summary & highlights ==
- Despite low expectations for the season, Syracuse won its first 15 games and finished the season as a regular-season conference co-champion and runner-up in the 1987 Big East tournament.
- Georgetown fielded a team that relied heavily on young and inexperienced players and was expected to have a rebuilding year, but instead had great success in conference and non-conference play, advanced to the Elite Eight in the NCAA tournament, and finished the season ranked No. 4 behind the leadership of senior forward and team captain Reggie Williams. The team received the nickname "Reggie and the Miracles."
- Georgetown, Pittsburgh, and Syracuse were the regular-season co-champions with identical records of 12–4. It was the third regular-season championship or co-championship for both Georgetown and Syracuse and the first for Pittsburgh.
- Georgetown won its fifth Big East tournament championship.
- In the NCAA Tournament, Providence and Syracuse both reached the Final Four, and Syracuse finished as the national runner-up, narrowly losing the national championship game to Indiana.
- The 104 points Syracuse scored against Western Kentucky in the second round of the NCAA tournament tied the record for the most points scored in an NCAA tournament game by a single team.

== Head coaches ==
School	Coach	Season	Notes
Boston College	Jim O'Brien	1st	
Connecticut	Jim Calhoun	1st	
Georgetown	John Thompson, Jr.	15th	Big East Coach of the Year (2nd award)
Pittsburgh	Paul Evans	1st	
Providence	Rick Pitino	2nd	Resigned July 13, 1987
St. John's	Lou Carnesecca	17th	
Seton Hall	P. J. Carlesimo	5th	
Syracuse	Jim Boeheim	11th	
Villanova	Rollie Massimino	12th	

== Rankings ==
Georgetown, Pittsburgh, and Syracuse were ranked in the Top 20 of the Associated Press poll for the entire season, and St. John's was in the Top 20 for most of the season. Providence also reached the Top 20 during February 1987.

1986–87 Big East Conference Weekly Rankings Key: ██ Increase in ranking. ██ Decrease in ranking.
AP Poll	Pre	12/1	12/8	12/15	12/22	12/29	1/5	1/12	1/19	1/26	2/2	2/9	2/16	2/23	3/2	Final
Boston College																
Connecticut																
Georgetown	18	16	13	10	10	8	16	9	15	11	10	13	11	8	7	4
Pittsburgh	16	12	17	14	14	17	14	18	16	17	13	10	8	9	11	12
Providence											17	20	19	20		
St. John's				15	15	10	10	13	14	15	19	16	20			
Seton Hall																
Syracuse	15	17	12	9	7	7	5	5	7	6	11	9	9	11	10	10
Villanova																

== Regular-season statistical leaders ==
Scoring
Name	School	PPG
Reggie Williams	GU	23.6
Billy Donovan	Prov	20.6
Mark Jackson	SJU	18.9
Dana Barros	BC	18.7
James Major	SHU	17.6

Rebounding
Name	School	RPG
Jerome Lane	Pitt	13.5
Gerry Besselink	Conn	10.7
Derrick Coleman	Syr	8.8
Reggie Williams	GU	8.6
Charles Smith	Pitt	8.5

Assists
Name	School	APG
Sherman Douglas	Syr	7.6
Billy Donovan	Prov	7.1
Mark Jackson	SJU	6.4
Tate George	Conn	6.0
Kenny Wilson	Vill	5.1

Steals
Name	School	SPG
Billy Donovan	Prov	2.4
Reggie Williams	GU	2.1
Mark Jackson	SJU	2.0
Gary Massey	Vill	1.8
Delray Brooks	Prov	1.8

Blocks
Name	School	BPG
Charles Smith	Pitt	3.2
Rony Seikaly	Syr	2.1
Derrick Coleman	Syr	2.8
Jeff King	Conn	1.7
Tyrone Scott	BC	1.5

Field Goals
Name	School	FG%
Rony Seikaly	Syr	.568
Jerome Lane	Pitt	.568
Charles Smith	Pitt	.550
Sherman Douglas	Syr	.531
Willie Glass	SJU	.515

3-Pt Field Goals
Name	School	3FG%
Pop Lewis	Prov	.432
Billy Donovan	Prov	.409
James Major	SHU	.390
(no other qualifiers)

Free Throws
Name	School	FT%
Jamie Benton	BC	.884
Dana Barros	BC	.850
Billy Donovan	Prov	.843
Mark Jackson	SJU	.806
Reggie Williams	GU	.804

== Postseason ==
=== Big East tournament ===
==== Seeding ====
Seeding in the Big East tournament was based on conference record, with tiebreakers applied as necessary. The eighth- and ninth-seeded teams played a first-round game, and the other seven teams received a bye into the quarterfinals.

The tournament's seeding was as follows: (1) Georgetown, (2) Pittsburgh, (3) Syracuse, (4) Providence, (5) St. John's, (6) Villanova, (7) Seton Hall, (8) Boston College, (9) Connecticut.

==== Bracket ====
First round March 5, 1987
8	Boston College	61
9	Connecticut	59

Quarterfinals; March 6, 1987
1	#7 Georgetown	56
8	Boston College	51
4	Providence	80
5	St. John's	51
3	#10 Syracuse	72
6	Villanova	66
2	#11 Pittsburgh	102
7	Seton Hall	79

Semifinals; March 7, 1987
1	#7 Georgetown	84
4	Providence	66
3	#10 Syracuse	99
2	#11 Pittsburgh	85

Championship Game; March 8, 1987
1	#7 Georgetown	69
3	#10 Syracuse	59

=== NCAA tournament ===
Five Big East teams received bids to the NCAA Tournament, with Georgetown seeded No. 1 in the Southeast Region. Pittsburgh and St. John's both lost in the second round, and Providence upset Georgetown in the Southeast Region final. Syracuse defeated Providence in a national semifinal game but lost to Indiana in the national championship game.

School	Region	Seed	Round 1	Round 2	Sweet 16	Elite 8	Final 4	Final
Syracuse	East	2	15 Georgia Southern, W 79–73	10 Western Kentucky, W 104–86	6 Florida, W 87–81	1 North Carolina, W 79–75	SE6 Providence W 77–63	MW1 Indiana, L 74–73
Providence	Southeast	6	11 UAB, W 90–68	14 Austin Peay, W 90–87^{OT}	2 Alabama, W 103–82	1 Georgetown, W 88–73	E2 Syracuse L 77–63	
Georgetown	Southeast	1	16 Bucknell, W 75–53	9 Ohio State, W 82–79	5 Kansas, W 70–57	6 Providence, L 88–73		
Pittsburgh	West	3	14 Marist, W 93–68	6 Oklahoma, L 78–54				
St. John's	Midwest	6	11 Wichita State, W 93–68	3 DePaul, L 96–93				

=== National Invitation Tournament ===
Two Big East teams received bids to the National Invitation Tournament, which did not yet have seeding. Playing in the same unnamed bracket, Seton Hall and Villanova both lost in the first round.

School	Round 1
Seton Hall	Niagara, L 74–65
Villanova	La Salle, L 86–84

== Awards and honors ==
=== Big East Conference ===
Player of the Year:

- Reggie Williams, Georgetown, F, Sr.

Defensive Player of the Year:

- Mark Jackson, St. John's, G, Sr.

Freshman of the Year:

- Derrick Coleman, Syracuse, F

Coach of the Year:

- John Thompson, Jr., Georgetown (15th season)

All-Big East First Team

- Reggie Williams, Georgetown, G, Sr., 6 ft 7 in (201 cm), 190 lb (86 kg), Baltimore, Md.
- Charles Smith, Pittsburgh, F, Jr., 6 ft 10 in (208 cm), 250 lb (113 kg), Bridgeport, Conn.
- Jerome Lane, Pittsburgh, F, So., 6 ft 6 in (198 cm), 230 lb (104 kg), Akron, Ohio
- Billy Donovan, Providence, G, Sr. 5 ft 11 in (180 cm), 171 lb (78 kg), Baltimore, Md.
- Mark Jackson, St. John's, F, Sr., 6 ft 6 in (198 cm), 205 lb (93 kg), Brooklyn, N.Y.
- Sherman Douglas, Syracuse, G, So., 6 ft 0 in (183 cm), 180 lb (82 kg), Washington, D.C.

All-Big East Second Team:

- Dana Barros, Boston College, G, So., 5 ft 11 in (180 cm), 163 lb (74 kg), Boston, Mass.
- Perry McDonald, Georgetown, F, Jr., 6 ft 4 in (193 cm), 190 lb (86 kg), New Orleans, La.
- Mark Bryant, Seton Hall, F, Jr., 6 ft 9 in (206 cm), 245 lb (111 kg), Glen Ridge, N.J.
- Rony Seikaly, Syracuse, C, Jr. 6 ft 10 in (208 cm), 240 lb (109 kg), Athens, Greece
- Harold Jensen, Villanova, G, Sr., 6 ft 4 in (193 cm), 200 lb (91 kg), Trumbull, Conn.

All-Big East Third Team:

- Dave Kipfer, Providence, F, Sr., 6 ft 7 in (201 cm), 212 lb (96 kg), Kitchener, Ontario, Canada
- James Major, Seton Hall, G, Jr., 5 ft 11 in (180 cm)
- Willie Glass, St. John's, G, Jr., 6 ft 6 in (198 cm), 205 lb (93 kg), Atlantic City, N.J.
- Derrick Coleman, Syracuse, F, Fr., 6 ft 10 in (208 cm), 258 lb (117 kg), Mobile, Ala.
- Greg Monroe, Syracuse, G, Sr. 6 ft 3 in (191 cm), 195 lb (88 kg), Rochester, N.Y.

Big East All-Freshman Team:

- Tate George, Connecticut, G, 6 ft 5 in (196 cm), 190 lb (86 kg), Newark, N.J.
- Dwayne Bryant, Georgetown, G, 6 ft 2 in (188 cm), 190 lb (86 kg), New Orleans, La.
- Mark Tillmon, Georgetown, G, 6 ft 2 in (188 cm), 190 lb (86 kg), Washington, D.C.
- Rod Brookin, Pittsburgh, F, 6 ft 5 in (196 cm), 260 lb (118 kg), Steelton, Pa.
- Derrick Coleman, Syracuse, F, 6 ft 10 in (208 cm), 258 lb (117 kg), Mobile, Ala.

=== All-Americans ===
The following players were selected to the 1987 Associated Press All-America teams.

Consensus All-America First Team:

- Reggie Williams, Georgetown, Key Stats: 23.6 ppg, 8.6 rpg, 2.7 apg, 48.2 FG%, 38.6 3P%, 802 points

Consensus All-America Second Team:

- Mark Jackson, St. John's, Key Stats: 18.9 ppg, 3.7 rpg, 6.4 apg, 50.4 FG%, 41.9 3P%, 566 points

First Team All-America:

- Reggie Williams, Georgetown, Key Stats: 23.6 ppg, 8.6 rpg, 2.7 apg, 48.2 FG%, 38.6 3P%, 802 points

Second Team All-America:

- Mark Jackson, St. John's, Key Stats: 18.9 ppg, 3.7 rpg, 6.4 apg, 50.4 FG%, 41.9 3P%, 566 points

Third Team All-America:

- Jerome Lane, Pittsburgh, Key Stats: 15.8 ppg, 13.5 rpg, 2.2 apg, 56.8 FG%, 50.0 3P%, 522 points

AP Honorable Mention

- Sherman Douglas, Syracuse
- Charles Smith, Pittsburgh

== See also ==
- 1986–87 NCAA Division I men's basketball season
- 1986–87 Connecticut Huskies men's basketball team
- 1986–87 Georgetown Hoyas men's basketball team
- 1986–87 Pittsburgh Panthers men's basketball team
- 1986–87 Providence Friars men's basketball team
- 1986–87 St. John's Redmen basketball team
- 1986–87 Syracuse Orangemen basketball team
