= 1987 Big East men's basketball tournament =

- Classification: Division I
- Season: 1986–87
- Teams: 9
- Site: Madison Square Garden; New York City
- Champions: Georgetown (5th title)
- Winning coach: John Thompson (5th title)
- MVP: Reggie Williams (Georgetown)
- Television: Big East Network; CBS (Semi-Finals and Championship game)

1986–87 Big East men's basketball standings
	Conf.				Overall
Team	W		L	PCT	W		L	PCT
No. 4 Georgetown†	12	–	4	.750	29	–	5	.853
No. 12 Pittsburgh	12	–	4	.750	25	–	8	.758
No. 10 Syracuse	12	–	4	.750	31	–	7	.816
Providence	10	–	6	.625	25	–	9	.735
St. John's	10	–	6	.625	21	–	9	.700
Villanova	6	–	10	.375	15	–	16	.484
Seton Hall	4	–	12	.250	15	–	14	.517
Boston College	3	–	13	.188	11	–	18	.379
Connecticut	3	–	13	.188	9	–	19	.321
† 1987 Big East tournament winner As of March 30, 1987; Rankings from AP Poll

The 1987 Big East men's basketball tournament took place at Madison Square Garden in New York City, from March 5 to March 8, 1987. Its winner received the Big East Conference's automatic bid to the 1987 NCAA tournament. It is a single-elimination tournament with four rounds. Georgetown had the best regular season conference record and received the #1 seed.

Georgetown defeated Syracuse in the championship game 69–59, to claim its fifth Big East tournament championship.

== Bracket ==
First round March 5, 1987
8	Boston College	61
9	Connecticut	59

Quarterfinals; March 6, 1987
1	#7 Georgetown	56
8	Boston College	51
4	Providence	80
5	St. John's	51
3	#10 Syracuse	72
6	Villanova	66
2	#11 Pittsburgh	102
7	Seton Hall	79

Semifinals; March 7, 1987
1	#7 Georgetown	84
4	Providence	66
3	#10 Syracuse	99
2	#11 Pittsburgh	85

Championship Game; March 8, 1987
1	#7 Georgetown	69
3	#10 Syracuse	59

== Games ==
=== Final ===
March 8

Box

Syracuse 59, Georgetown 69
Scoring by half: 32–39, 27–30
Pts: Sherman Douglas 20; Rebs: Rony Seikaly 8 Asts: Sherman Douglas 8	Pts: Reggie Williams 25; Rebs: Reggie Williams 9 Asts: Bobby Winston 7

Madison Square Garden
Attendance: 19,591

== Awards ==
Most Valuable Player: Reggie Williams, Georgetown

All Tournament Team

- Billy Donovan, Providence
- Sherman Douglas, Syracuse
- Jerome Lane, Pittsburgh
- Rony Seikaly, Syracuse
- Reggie Williams, Georgetown
