= 1987 NCAA Division I men's basketball championship game =

American college basketball final

1987 NCAA Tournament Championship Game
National championship game
Syracuse Orangemen	Indiana Hoosiers
Big East	Big Ten
(31–6)	(29–4)
73	74
Head coach: Jim Boeheim	Head coach: Bob Knight
- AP: 10
- Coaches: 10
- AP: 3
- Coaches: 2
	1st half	2nd half	Total
Syracuse Orangemen	33	40	73
Indiana Hoosiers	34	40	74
- Date: March 30, 1987
- Venue: Louisiana Superdome, New Orleans, Louisiana
- MVP: Keith Smart, Indiana
- Favorite: Indiana by 5
- Referees: Joe Forte, Jody Silvester, Nolan Fine

United States TV coverage
- Network: CBS
- Announcers: Brent Musburger (play-by-play); Billy Packer (color)

The 1987 NCAA Division I men's basketball championship game was the final round of the 1987 NCAA Division I men's basketball tournament and determined the national champion for the 1986–87 NCAA Division I men's basketball season The game was played on March 30, 1987, at the Louisiana Superdome in New Orleans, Louisiana, and featured the Midwest Regional Champion, #1-seeded Indiana and the East Regional Champion, #2-seeded Syracuse.

"One Shining Moment", which serves as the closing song for the NCAA Tournament coverage, was played for the first time after this game. It was originally slated to debut after Super Bowl XXI, which also aired on CBS, but was shelved due to player interviews taking up too much time and the network scheduling a primetime show immediately following the game.

== Participating teams ==
=== Syracuse Orangemen ===
- East
  - (2) Syracuse 79, (15) Georgia Southern 73
  - (2) Syracuse 104, (10) Western Kentucky 86
  - (2) Syracuse 87, (6) Florida 81
  - (2) Syracuse 79, (1) North Carolina 75
- Final Four
  - (E2) Syracuse 77, (SE6) Providence 63

=== Indiana Hoosiers ===
- Midwest
  - (1) Indiana 92, Fairfield (16) 58
  - (1) Indiana 107, (8) Auburn 90
  - (1) Indiana 88, (5) Duke 82
  - (1) Indiana 77, (10) LSU 76
- Final Four
  - (MW1) Indiana 97, (W1) UNLV 93

== Starting lineups ==
Syracuse	Position	Indiana
Sherman Douglas	G	† Steve Alford
Greg Monroe	G	Keith Smart
Derrick Coleman	F	Rick Calloway
Howard Triche	F	Daryl Thomas
Rony Seikaly	C	Dean Garrett
† 1987 Consensus First Team All-American

== Game summary ==
CBS

Monday, March, 30

Box score

#MW1 Indiana Hoosiers 74, #E2 Syracuse Orangemen 73
Pts: S. Alford - 23; Rebs: D. Garrett - 10; Asts: J. Hillman, K. Smart - 6	Pts: S. Douglas - 20; Rebs: D. Coleman - 19; Asts: S. Douglas - 7 Halftime Score: Indiana, 34-33

Louisiana Superdome - New Orleans, LA

Syracuse led, 73–72, with 28 seconds remaining, but Derrick Coleman missed the front end of a one-and-one, setting the stage for the game-winner from Keith Smart, who hit a jumper over Howard Triche with four seconds left. By the time Syracuse called timeout to set up a final play, there was one second remaining. A final desperation length-of-the-court pass was intercepted by Smart, who flung the ball into the stands, and the Hoosiers celebrated their national championship win.
