= Delray Brooks =

American basketball player (born 1965)

Biographical details
- Born: October 24, 1965 (age 61)

Playing career
- 1984–1986: Indiana
- 1986–1988: Providence
- ?–1991: Erie Wave
- 1991: Florida Jades
- Position: Guard

Coaching career (HC unless noted)
- 1992–1993: Kentucky (Asst. Strgth & Cond.)
- 1993–1997: Kentucky (Asst.)
- 1997–1999: Texas–Pan American
- 2002–2003: Pope John Paul II HS
- ??: in California
- 2005–2010: La Lumiere School
- 2015–2018: Clay HS

Administrative career (AD unless noted)
- 1991: Florida Jades (V.P. of Basketball ops.)
- 2008–2010: La Lumiere School

Head coaching record
- Overall: 8–46 (.148)

Accomplishments and honors

Championships
- Assistant coach NCAA champion (1996); 2× NCAA Regional Champion - Final Four (1996, 1997)

Awards
- Co-Indiana Mr. Basketball (1984); USA Today Player of the Year (1984); First-team Parade All-American (1984); McDonald's All-American (1984)

Delray Brooks (born October 24, 1965) is an American basketball coach and former basketball player. Brooks was an Indiana high school basketball star who was named both 1984 Co-Indiana Mr. Basketball and 1984 USA Today Player of the Year. After high school, he first attended Indiana University to play basketball for Bobby Knight. When he didn't fit into the team plans as he had hoped he transferred to play for Rick Pitino at Providence College, where the team was one of the most successful in school history. As a professional player, his career floundered in various leagues before he began coaching basketball as an assistant for Pitino at the University of Kentucky. He reached the NCAA Men's Division I Basketball Championship final four as both a player and assistant coach. When Pitino left for the NBA, he moved on to a head coaching position at the University of Texas-Pan American. He was eventually caught up in a scandal and fired. He has since coached various high school teams. As of 20 May 2015, he is the head coach for the men's basketball team at Clay High School.

== Early life ==
In high school, he served as junior and senior class president as well as governor of the Indiana Boys State Convention. He was 1984 co-Indiana Mr. Basketball and USA Today Boys' Basketball Player of the Year while playing for the Rogers High School, who went 28–1. He is also retroactively regarded as a runner-up for Mr. Basketball USA. He was one of two high school players (along with Danny Manning) invited to try out for the United States men's national basketball team at the 1984 Summer Olympics. Brooks also earned varsity letters in baseball and tennis.

== College ==
=== Indiana ===
He subsequently played for the 1984–85 Indiana Hoosiers men's basketball team and part of the season for the 1985–86 Hoosiers before transferring to Providence. He played more than any other Indiana freshmen, averaging 15 minutes per game and starting seven times by mid February. Among his early season highlights were a 10-assist December 8, 1984 game against Kentucky and a 15-point effort against Notre Dame. Later in the season, he tallied 16 points against Minnesota. By the end of the season, he had started 12 games, but his playing time was reduced and he only averaged 2.4 points per game to start his sophomore season. He had been expected to be the sixth man behind Steve Alford and Stew Robinson. He was frustrated with his lack of playing time and after only playing 4 minutes in the first two conference games against Michigan and Michigan State as a sophomore he decided to transfer.

=== Providence ===
Notre Dame had been Brooks' second choice behind Indiana, but Notre Dame had a policy against transfer athletes. He was ineligible for scholarships from other Big Ten Conference schools. He had an offer to transfer from NC State, but chose Providence. He enrolled in the spring of 1986, making him ineligible to play until the end of the Fall 1986 semester. Under head coach Rick Pitino, he restructured his jump shot. He completed his ineligibility on December 20, 1986. Within a little over a week, Brooks and Billy Donovan combined for 50 or more points on two separate occasions. On January 10, he went 8-for-9 on three-point field goal and set a new career-high with 34 points, helping Providence end a 12-game losing streak against the Villanova Wildcats. As of February 13, Providence led the nation in three-point shots with 8.5 per game in the first year of its use. Sixth-seeded Providence made their second ever Final Four at the 1987 NCAA Men's Division I Basketball Tournament with Donovan and Brooks for Pitino. In the Sweet Sixteen round, Brooks scored a game-high 26 points against Southeastern Conference champion, second-seeded Alabama. The 1986–87 Hoosiers made the final four along with the 1986–87 Friars. The Final Four loss to Syracuse was marred by a bench-clearing brawl that began when Brooks and Sherman Douglas got tangled up. Brooks led the 1987–88 Friars in scoring but went undrafted in the 1988 NBA draft.

== Professional career ==
He played for the Erie Wave of the World Basketball League (WBL) before founding the Florida Jades of the WBL in 1991. For a time he was working for the management of a drug store chain while playing in the WBL. He eventually became a player/founder/manager of the Florida Jades when he served as the team's Vice President of Basketball Operations.

== Coaching career ==
He later served on Pitino's staff at Kentucky, from 1992–97 including the National Champion 1995–96 Kentucky Wildcats men's basketball team. He spent his first year as the recruiting coordinator and assistant strength and conditioning coach before being promoted to assistant coach. The 1992–93 Wildcats made the final four and the defending champion 1996–97 Wildcats lost in the championship game. Ten players that he recruited became National Basketball Association players.

He then became the head coach for Texas–Pan American Broncs men's basketball for two seasons from 1997–99 before an embezzlement scandal erupted. Texas–Pan American had lost its National Collegiate Athletic Association certification in 1996, but the certification was restored in 1998. On August 23, 1999, Brooks was fired. On October 14, 1999, Brooks was indicted by a grand jury on a felony theft charge for an allegation regarding depositing a $25,000 check from Southwest Missouri State into his personal account and subsequently making withdrawals from the account. Brooks has denied making the deposit or instructing a third party to do so, although he consents that the alleged $25,000 was added to his account. In that jurisdiction, theft by a public servant of between $20,000 and $100,000 was a second-degree felony. An overcrowded Hidalgo County docket caused a trial delay, but in May 2000, he pleaded no contest in a plea bargain in which prosecutors recommended a maximum punishment of 10 years of probation conditional on repayment of stolen funds. Brooks was arrested in 2006 for failing to pay restitution and maintain communication with his probation officer.

He coached in Florida and California before returning to his hometown to coach for five years at the La Lumiere School, where he also served as athletic director for the final two years. Among his players at La Lumiere was eventual Northwestern player, Luka Mirkovic. La Lumiere was a non-Indiana High School Athletic Association (IHSAA) member. In 2015, he became the head coach of the men's basketball team at Clay High School where he has served as a special education teacher since 2013.

=== Head coaching record ===
Record table
Season	Team	Overall	Conference	Standing	Postseason
Texas–Pan American Broncs (Sun Belt Conference) (1997–1998)
1997–98	Texas–Pan American	3–24	3–15	10th	
Texas–Pan American Broncs (Independent) (1998–1999)
1998–99	Texas–Pan American	5–22			
Texas–Pan American:		8–46	3–15		
Total:		8–46			
National champion Postseason invitational champion Conference regular season champion Conference regular season and conference tournament champion Division regular season champion Division regular season and conference tournament champion Conference tournament champion

== Personal ==
His father, Raymond Brooks, was the fire chief of Michigan City, Indiana and became the fire chief of Evanston, Illinois approximately at the beginning of 1988. His younger sister's name is Erika and his mother's name is Doris. He was depicted in the 2002 film A Season on the Brink. In 2012, he married Clay High grad April Presley.
