= 1987 MEAC men's basketball tournament =

- Classification: Division I
- Season: 1986–87
- Teams: 7
- Site: Greensboro Coliseum; Greensboro, North Carolina
- Champions: North Carolina A&T (12th title)
- Winning coach: Don Corbett (6th title)
- MVP: Thomas Griffis (North Carolina A&T)

1986–87 MEAC men's basketball standings
	Conf.				Overall
Team	W		L	PCT	W		L	PCT
Howard	13	–	1	.929	24	–	4	.857
North Carolina A&T †	12	–	2	.857	24	–	6	.800
South Carolina State	9	–	5	.643	14	–	15	.483
Coppin State	7	–	6	.538	8	–	19	.296
Bethune–Cookman	6	–	8	.429	10	–	19	.345
Morgan State	5	–	9	.357	8	–	20	.286
Delaware State	3	–	11	.214	4	–	24	.143
Maryland Eastern Shore	0	–	13	.000	2	–	24	.077
Florida A&M		–		–	12	–	16	.429
† 1987 MEAC tournament winner Rankings from AP Poll

The 1987 Mid-Eastern Athletic Conference men's basketball tournament took place March 5–7, 1987, at Greensboro Coliseum in Greensboro, North Carolina. North Carolina A&T defeated Howard, 79–58 in the championship game, to win its sixth consecutive MEAC Tournament title – all against Howard in the championship game.

The Aggies earned an automatic bid to the 1987 NCAA tournament as a No. 15 seed in the Southeast region.

== Format ==
Seven of nine conference members participated, with play beginning in the quarterfinal round. Teams were seeded based on their regular season conference record.

== Bracket ==
Quarterfinals; March 5
4	Bethune–Cookman	64
5	Delaware State	63
3	South Carolina State	81
6	Maryland Eastern Shore	76
2	North Carolina A&T	80
7	Florida A&M	65

Semifinals; March 6
1	Howard	63
4	Bethune–Cookman	56
3	South Carolina State	65
2	North Carolina A&T	73

Final; March 7
1	Howard	58
2	North Carolina A&T	79
