= 1987 SWAC men's basketball tournament =

Basketball Tournament March 1986 in Mississippi

- Classification: Division I
- Season: 1986–87
- Teams: 8
- Site: Mississippi Coast Coliseum; Biloxi, Mississippi
- Champions: Southern (3rd title)
- Winning coach: Ben Jobe (1st title)
- MVP: Avery Johnson (Southern)

1986–87 SWAC men's basketball standings
	Conf.				Overall
Team	W		L	PCT	W		L	PCT
Grambling	11	–	3	.786	16	–	14	.533
Southern †	9	–	5	.643	19	–	12	.613
Mississippi Valley State	9	–	5	.643	13	–	15	.464
Jackson State	8	–	6	.571	15	–	14	.517
Alabama State	7	–	7	.500	14	–	14	.500
Texas Southern	7	–	7	.500	11	–	11	.500
Alcorn State	8	–	6	.571	15	–	14	.517
Prairie View A&M	8	–	6	.571	15	–	14	.517
† 1987 SWAC tournament winner Rankings from AP Poll

The 1987 SWAC men's basketball tournament was held March 4–6, 1987, at the Mississippi Coast Coliseum in Biloxi, Mississippi. Southern defeated Grambling State, 105–55 in the championship game. The Jaguars received the conference's automatic bid to the 1987 NCAA tournament as No. 15 seed in the Midwest Region.

== Bracket and results ==
Quarterfinals; March 4
1	Grambling State	63
8	Prairie View A&M	61
4	Jackson State	84
5	Alabama State	73
3	Mississippi Valley State	65
6	Texas Southern	70
2	Southern	103
7	Alcorn State	89

Semifinals; March 5
1	Grambling State	56
4	Jackson State	55
6	Texas Southern	87
2	Southern	100

Final; March 6
1	Grambling State	55
2	Southern	105
