= 1987 NCAA Men's Basketball All-Americans =

- Awarded for: 1986–87 NCAA Division I men's basketball season

The Consensus 1987 College Basketball All-American team, as determined by aggregating the results of four major All-American teams. To earn "consensus" status, a player must win honors from a majority of the following teams: the Associated Press, the USBWA, The United Press International and the National Association of Basketball Coaches.

== 1987 Consensus All-America team ==
Consensus First Team
Player	Position	Class	Team
Steve Alford	G	Senior	Indiana
Danny Manning	F	Junior	Kansas
David Robinson	C	Senior	Navy
Kenny Smith	G	Senior	North Carolina
Reggie Williams	F	Senior	Georgetown

Consensus Second Team
Player	Position	Class	Team
Armon Gilliam	F	Senior	UNLV
Horace Grant	F/C	Senior	Clemson
Dennis Hopson	G	Senior	Ohio State
Mark Jackson	G	Senior	St. John's
Ken Norman	F	Senior	Illinois

== Individual All-America teams ==
All-America Team
All-America Team	First team		Second team		Third team	
All-America Team	Player	School	Player	School	Player	School
Associated Press	Steve Alford	Indiana	Armon Gilliam	UNLV	Derrick McKey	Alabama
Associated Press	Danny Manning	Kansas	Dennis Hopson	Ohio State	Jerome Lane	Pittsburgh
Associated Press	David Robinson	Navy	Mark Jackson	St. John's	Dallas Comegys	DePaul
Associated Press	Kenny Smith	North Carolina	Horace Grant	Clemson	Derrick Chievous	Missouri
Associated Press	Reggie Williams	Georgetown	Ken Norman	Illinois	Tony White	Tennessee
USBWA	Steve Alford	Indiana	Armon Gilliam	UNLV	No third team	
USBWA	Danny Manning	Kansas	Dennis Hopson	Ohio State	No third team	
USBWA	David Robinson	Navy	Mark Jackson	St. John's	No third team	
USBWA	Kenny Smith	North Carolina	Gary Grant	Michigan	No third team	
USBWA	Reggie Williams	Georgetown	Ken Norman	Illinois	No third team	
NABC	Steve Alford	Indiana	Armon Gilliam	UNLV	Derrick McKey	Alabama
NABC	Danny Manning	Kansas	Dennis Hopson	Ohio State	Jerome Lane	Pittsburgh
NABC	David Robinson	Navy	Mark Jackson	St. John's	Ken Norman	Illinois
NABC	Kenny Smith	North Carolina	Horace Grant	Clemson	Tommy Amaker	Duke
NABC	Reggie Williams	Georgetown	Dallas Comegys	DePaul	Kevin Houston	Army
UPI	Steve Alford	Indiana	Armon Gilliam	UNLV	Nate Blackwell	Temple
UPI	Danny Manning	Kansas	Dennis Hopson	Ohio State	Jerome Lane	Pittsburgh
UPI	David Robinson	Navy	Mark Jackson	St. John's	Dallas Comegys	DePaul
UPI	Kenny Smith	North Carolina	Derrick Chievous	Missouri	Horace Grant	Clemson
UPI	Reggie Williams	Georgetown	Derrick McKey	Alabama	Tony White	Tennessee

AP Honorable Mention:

- Tommy Amaker, Duke
- Freddie Banks, UNLV
- Nate Blackwell, Temple
- Sherman Douglas, Syracuse
- Ledell Eackles, New Orleans
- Tellis Frank, Western Kentucky
- Gary Grant, Michigan
- Jeff Grayer, Iowa State
- Hersey Hawkins, Bradley
- Kevin Houston, Army
- Derrick Lewis, Maryland
- Troy Lewis, Purdue
- Reggie Miller, UCLA
- José Ortiz, Oregon State
- J. R. Reid, North Carolina
- David Rivers, Notre Dame
- Charles Smith, Pittsburgh
- Rod Strickland, DePaul
- Chris Welp, Washington
- Joe Wolf, North Carolina
