= 1986–87 Georgetown Hoyas men's basketball team =

American college basketball season

1986–87 Georgetown Hoyas men's basketball

Hawaii-Hilo Classic Champions Big East regular season co-champions Big East tournament champions

NCAA tournament, Elite Eight
- Conference: Big East Conference

Ranking
- Coaches: No. 4
- AP: No. 4
- Record: 29−5 (12−4 Big East)
- Head coach: John Thompson (15th season)
- Assistant coaches: Craig Esherick (5th season); Mike Riley (5th season)
- Captain: Reggie Williams
- Home arena: Capital Centre

1986–87 Big East men's basketball standings
	Conf.				Overall
Team	W		L	PCT	W		L	PCT
No. 4 Georgetown†	12	–	4	.750	29	–	5	.853
No. 12 Pittsburgh	12	–	4	.750	25	–	8	.758
No. 10 Syracuse	12	–	4	.750	31	–	7	.816
Providence	10	–	6	.625	25	–	9	.735
St. John's	10	–	6	.625	21	–	9	.700
Villanova	6	–	10	.375	15	–	16	.484
Seton Hall	4	–	12	.250	15	–	14	.517
Boston College	3	–	13	.188	11	–	18	.379
Connecticut	3	–	13	.188	9	–	19	.321
† 1987 Big East tournament winner As of March 30, 1987; Rankings from AP Poll

The 1986–87 Georgetown Hoyas men's basketball team represented Georgetown University in the 1986–87 NCAA Division I college basketball season. John Thompson, coached them in his 15th season as head coach. They played their home games at the Capital Centre in Landover, Maryland. They were members of the Big East Conference and finished the season with a record of 29–5, 12–4 in Big East play. They shared the conference regular season championship with Pittsburgh and Syracuse and won the 1987 Big East men's basketball tournament, defeating Syracuse in the final game for the fifth Big East tournament championship in Georgetown men's basketball history. They advanced to the East Region final of the 1987 NCAA tournament before losing to Providence. Nicknamed "Reggie and the Miracles", the team was ranked No. 4 in the season's final Associated Press Poll and Coaches' Poll.

== Season recap ==
After the adoption of a shot clock the previous season, another major change came to National Collegiate Athletic Association (NCAA) men's basketball this year with the adoption of a three-point shot. The three-point line was set a 19 feet 9 inches (6.02 meters), where it would remain until it was increased to 20 feet 9 inches (6.32 meters) at the beginning of the 2008–09 season.

In May 1986, guards Horace Broadnax and Michael Jackson and guard-forward David Wingate all had graduated, and center Grady Mateen had transferred after his sophomore season to Ohio State during the off-season. The 1986-87 Hoyas thus returned only two starters and three upperclassmen from the previous year, and their heavy reliance on young and inexperienced players suggested a rebuilding year was at hand. Instead, senior guard and team captain Reggie Williams and his teammates played so well in Big East Conference play and the 1987 NCAA tournament, including many come-from behind wins, that the team became known as "Reggie and the Miracles."

Williams had one of the best individual seasons in Georgetown men's basketball history, leading the Hoyas in scoring 29 times and in rebounding 23 times during the season. During the first six games, he averaged 29.8 points per game, including a career-high 39 points against Washburn during the Hawaii-Hilo Classic on November 29, 1986. Two weeks later, he scored 26 points against Arizona, and a week after that he had 24 points against Texas-El Paso. In January 1987, early in the Big East season, he scored 31 points as the Hoyas came back from a halftime deficit to beat Pittsburgh.

Junior Perry McDonald had a breakout season, and also contributed to Georgetown's nine-game winning streak at the start of the season. After two years as a reserve shooting guard, McDonald moved to forward to replace the departed Wingate, and at his new position his scoring and rebounding skills finally came to the fore. In the first game of the year he scored a then-career-high 17 points against Quincy in the opening game of the Hawaii-Hilo Classic, and he went on to score in double figures in 30 of the season's 34 games. His scoring average per game jumped from 4.4 and 3.4 points in the previous two seasons to 13.0 points this year.

Freshman guard Mark Tillmon joined the team this season, starting 25 games and appearing in 33. He debuted with a 13-point game, and despite shooting only 39% from the field scored in double digits 13 times, finishing third in scoring on the team. In his best game of the year, he scored 19 points and seven rebounds at the Capital Centre against sixth-ranked DePaul. Overall, he averaged 9.7 points per game during the season.

Another freshman guard, Dwayne Bryant, arrived as one of Georgetown's most highly regarded recruits of the 1980s and started 28 of the team's 34 games. He shot only 34% from the field overall and 26% from beyond the three-point line, however, and averaged only 19 minutes and 4.3 points per game, but he showed some of his offensive potential by finishing only one assist short of the team lead and with the second highest number of assists of any rookie player on the varsity team in Georgetown history. He would emerge as an important scoring threat during his junior year.

Sophomore forward Jaren Jackson spent the season in a purely reserve role, averaging only 11 minutes and 5.7 points per game. Although he scored a season-high 19 points against Pittsburgh and had an 11-point, eight-rebound effort against Providence, his performance slumped as the season wore on and he averaged only 3.3 points per game during the latter part of the schedule. He would not emerge as one of Georgetown's top players until late in the following season.

On January 31, 1987, Georgetown faced Syracuse at the Capital Centre before a national television audience. Thompson decided that Georgetown center Ben Gillery could not compete against 6-foot-11 (211-cm) Syracuse center Rony Seikaly, so he took the unusual step of putting the 6-foot-4 guard-forward (193-cm) McDonald, known for his fearless style against larger opponents, in to play against Seikaly. Georgetown trailed for most of the game, but McDonald rose to the occasion, putting in one of the best performances of his collegiate career. On defense, he held Seikaly to four field goals and 13 points and scored a career-high 21 points despite Seikaly's height advantage, including a turnaround jumper at the buzzer in overtime to give Georgetown an 83–81 victory. He also had seven rebounds. Williams, meanwhile, scored 30 points in the game.

As Georgetown continued through its Big East schedule, Williams continued to excel. He scored 34 points and had 11 rebounds at Connecticut, and in a game against Pittsburgh in which the Hoyas trailed by as many as 12, he scored 21 points as Georgetown rallied to win by 13. McDonald, meanwhile, also again displayed his scoring prowess in a rematch with Syracuse at the Carrier Dome, scoring 22 points. In the last game of the regular season, Williams scored 24 points in a win over 20th-ranked Providence.

Georgetown shared the conference regular-season championship with Pittsburgh and Syracuse. Receiving a bye in the first round of the 1987 Big East men's basketball tournament, the Hoyas defeated Boston College in the quarterfinal with Williams scoring 24 points, Providence in the semifinal behind a 22-point performance by Williams, and Syracuse in the final in a game in which Williams scored 25 points. It was the fifth Big East tournament championship for Georgetown, and the third in four years.

Georgetown was the No. 1 seed in the Southeast Region of the 1987 NCAA Division I men's basketball tournament, the ninth of 14 consecutive Georgetown NCAA tournament appearances. In the first round, Williams led the way with 21 points in a win over Bucknell, and the Hoyas advanced to face a talented Ohio State team led by senior guard-forward Dennis Hopson in the second round.

At the half, Ohio State had an 11-point lead over the Hoyas. After the first minute of the second half, the lead had increased to 15, and Georgetown fell as many as 21 points behind the Buckeyes in the second half even though Williams scored 24 points during the game. When Bryant went to the bench with four fouls early in the second half, Thompson put reserve guard Charles Smith into the game to replace him. Smith, recruited to serve strictly as a reserve, had played behind Horace Broadnax and Michael Jackson the previous year, averaging only 3.0 points per game with limited playing time, and this season as a reserve behind Bryant and Tillmon had started only two games and scored only seven points before returning to the bench, and was averaging only five points per game. Against Ohio State, however, his performance suddenly changed the entire path of his basketball career as he rallied the Hoyas with a 22-point effort. In the final seconds of the game, after Thompson told him not to shoot and instead to get the ball to a more proven player, Smith found himself open and took a shot anyway; he sank it to give Georgetown an 82–79 win. True to form, "Reggie and the Miracles" had staged a tremendous comeback behind Smith's breakout effort, winning a game after trailing by double digits for the seventh time. Like McDonald, who had emerged during the Big East regular season as a star, Smith would become one of the great players in Georgetown history.

In the Southeast Region semifinal, Williams put in a 34-point performance in the Hoyas' victory over Kansas. The season finally came to an end in the Southeast Region final, when the region's No. 6 seed, Big East rival Providence, upset the Hoyas in a game in which Williams closed out his collegiate career by scoring 25 points. He finished the year setting nine of the school's individual season records, including points scored (802), three-point shots (78), points per game (23.6), rebounds (294), and minutes played (1,205). He graduated in May 1987 as one of only four Georgetown players to score 2,000 or more points, with a career average of 15.3 points per game. During his four years on the team, the Hoyas had posted a 122–19 (.865) record overall and a 56–5 (.918) record at home.

The team was ranked No. 4 in the season's final Associated Press Poll and Coaches' Poll.

== Roster ==
#	Name	Height	Weight (lbs.)	Position	Class	Hometown	Previous Team(s)
4	Bobby Winston	6'5"	N/A	G/F	So.	Washington, DC, U.S.	All Saints HS
10	Perry McDonald	6'4"	190	F	Jr.	New Orleans, LA, U.S.	George Washington Carver Senior HS
12	Dwayne Bryant	6'2"	190	G	Fr.	New Orleans, LA, U.S.	De La Salle HS
13	Charles Smith	6'0"	160	G	So.	Washington, DC, U.S.	All Saints HS
20	Mark Tillmon	6'2"	190	G	Fr.	Washington, DC, U.S.	Gonzaga College HS
21	Jaren Jackson	6'2"	190	F	So.	New Orleans, LA, U.S.	Walter L. Cohen HS
24	Anthony Allen	6'7"	190	F	Fr.	Port Arthur, TX, U.S.	Abraham Lincoln HS
34	Reggie Williams	6'7"	190	F	Sr.	Baltimore, MD, U.S.	Paul Laurence Dunbar HS
41	Tom Lang	6'0"	N/A	G	Jr.	Gaithersburg, Maryland, U.S.	Thomas Sprigg Wootton HS
42	Johnathan Edwards	6'8"	N/A	F	So.	New Orleans, LA, U.S.	O. Perry Walker HS
44	Ronnie Highsmith	6'8"	N/A	F	Jr.	Robersonville, NC, U.S.	United States Army
50	Sam Jefferson	7'2"	N/A	F/C	Fr.	Washington, DC, U.S.	Flint Hill School (Oakton, VA)
51	Ben Gillery	7'0"	N/A	C	Jr.	Detroit, MI, U.S.	Hutchinson Community College (Ks.)

== Rankings ==
Ranking movement Legend: ██ Improvement in ranking. ██ Decrease in ranking. ██ Not ranked the previous week. RV=Others receiving votes.
Poll	Pre	Wk 1	Wk 2	Wk 3	Wk 4	Wk 5	Wk 6	Wk 7	Wk 8	Wk 9	Wk 10	Wk 11	Wk 12	Wk 13	Wk 14	Final
AP	18	16	13	10	10	8	16	9	15	11	10	13	11	8	7	4
Coaches Poll	– (Note: No Coaches' Poll this week.)	12	11	8	9	8	17	8	16	13	10	10	12	7	7	4

== 1986–87 Schedule and results ==
Georgetown and Arizona State cancelled a game they had scheduled for December 9, 1986, after the Pacific-10 Conference insisted that its officials referee the game even though the contract between the two schools mandated the use of non-conference officials. Wishing to replace the Arizona State game, Georgetown encountered difficulty in finding a team on short notice that could play on a date that fit into the Hoyas' remaining schedule, but on January 28, 1987, booked Bowie State for a game on February 16, 1987. With the Capital Centre hosting the Ice Capades that day, the game was scheduled for McDonough Gymnasium on the Georgetown campus in Washington, D.C.

- All times are Eastern

Date time, TV	Rank^{#}	Opponent^{#}	Result	Record	Site (attendance) city, state
Regular Season
Fri., Nov. 28, 1986*	No. 18	vs. Quincy; Hawaii-Hilo Classic	W 90–45	1–0	University of Hawaii at Hilo Gymnasium (2,400); Hilo, HI
Sat., Nov. 29, 1986*	No. 18	vs. Washburn; Hawaii-Hilo Classic	W 84–55	2–0	University of Hawaii at Hilo Gymnasium (2,400); Hilo, HI
Wed., Dec. 3, 1986*	No. 16	Grambling State	W 96–52	3–0	Capital Centre (5,109); Landover, MD
Sat., Dec. 6, 1986*	No. 16	Saint Leo	W 126–51	4–0	Capital Centre (N/A); Landover, MD
Tue., Dec. 9, 1986*	No. 13	at Arizona State	cancelled		Arizona State University Activity Center (–); Tempe, AZ
Sat., Dec. 13, 1986*	No. 13	Arizona	W 82–74	5–0	Capital Centre (10,063); Landover, MD
Wed., Dec. 17, 1986*	No. 10	American	W 62–59	6–0	Capital Centre (4,960); Landover, MD
Sat., Dec. 20, 1986*	No. 10	Texas-El Paso	W 71–67	7–0	Capital Centre (5,764); Landover, MD
Tue., Dec. 23, 1986*	No. 10	Florida A&M	W 94–65	8–0	Capital Centre (5,197); Landover, MD
Tue., Dec. 30, 1986*	No. 8	at Long Beach State	W 86–72	9–0	Long Beach Arena (4,557); Long Beach, CA
Sat., Jan. 3, 1987	No. 8	Seton Hall	L 53–74	9–1 (0–1)	Capital Centre (6,472); Landover, MD
Wed., Jan. 7, 1987	No. 16	No. 10 St. John's	W 60–46	10–1 (1–1)	Capital Centre (11,843); Landover, MD
Sat., Jan. 10, 1987	No. 16	at No. 14 Pittsburgh	W 82–70	11–1 (2–1)	Civic Arena (16,290); Pittsburgh, PA
Mon., Jan. 12, 1987	No. 16	at Villanova	W 80–73	12–1 (3–1)	Spectrum (15,621); Philadelphia, PA
Sat., Jan. 17, 1987	No. 9	at Seton Hall	L 65–66	12–2 (3–2)	Brendan Byrne Arena (9,111); East Rutherford, NJ
Wed., Jan. 21, 1987	No. 15	Connecticut; Rivalry	W 65–51	13–2 (4–2)	Capital Centre (7,353); Landover, MD
Sun., Jan. 25, 1987*	No. 15	No. 6 DePaul	W 74–71	14–2	Capital Centre (N/A); Landover, MD
Wed., Jan 28, 1987	No. 11	at Providence	L 79–82	14–3 (4–3)	Providence Civic Center (12,014); Providence, RI
Sat., Jan. 31, 1987; 3:00 p.m.	No. 11	No. 6 Syracuse; Rivalry	W 83–81 ^{OT}	15–3 (5–3)	Capital Centre (18,744); Landover, MD
Mon., Feb. 1, 1987	No. 11	at No. 15 St. John's	L 65–67	15–4 (5–4)	Madison Square Garden (17,093); New York, NY
Sat., Feb. 7, 1987	No. 10	Villanova	W 89–86	16–4 (6–4)	Capital Centre (14,052); Landover, MD
Mon., Feb. 9, 1987	No. 10	Boston College	W 78–56	17–4 (7–4)	Capital Centre (6,147); Landover, MD
Wed., Feb. 11, 1987	No. 13	at Connecticut; Rivalry	W 78–50	18–4 (8–4)	Hartford Civic Center (11,035); Hartford, CT
Mon., Feb. 16, 1987*	No. 13	Bowie State	W 87–51	19–4	McDonough Gymnasium (2,950); Washington, DC
Wed., Feb. 18, 1987	No. 11	No. 8 Pittsburgh	W 65–52	20–4 (9–4)	Capital Centre (12,564); Landover, MD
Sun., Feb 22, 1987; 2:30 p.m.	No. 10	at No. 9 Syracuse; Rivalry	W 72–71	21–4 (10–4)	Carrier Dome (32,602); Syracuse, NY
Tue., Feb. 24, 1987	No. 8	at Boston College	W 79–65	22–4 (11–4)	Boston Garden (6,732); Boston, MA
Sat., Feb. 28, 1987	No. 8	No. 20 Providence	W 90–79	23–4 (12–4)	Capital Centre (17,025); Landover, MD
Big East tournament
Fri., Mar. 6, 1987	(1) No. 7	vs. (8) Boston College; Quarterfinals	W 56–51	24–4	Madison Square Garden (19,591); New York, NY
Sat., Mar. 7, 1987	(1) No. 7	vs. (4) Providence; Semifinals	W 84–66	25–4	Madison Square Garden (19,591); New York, NY
Sun., Mar. 8, 1987; 2:30 p.m.	(1) No. 7	vs. (3) No. 10 Syracuse; Championship/Rivalry	W 69–59	26–4	Madison Square Garden (19,591); New York, NY
NCAA Tournament
Fri., Mar. 13, 1987	(1 SE) No. 4	vs. (16 SE) Bucknell; First round	W 75–53	27–4	Omni Coliseum (15,236); Atlanta, GA
Sun., Mar. 15, 1987	(1 SE) No. 4	vs. (9 SE) Ohio State; Second round	W 82–79	28–4	Omni Coliseum (15,236); Atlanta, GA
Fri., Mar. 20, 1987	(1 SE) No. 4	vs. (5 SE) No. 20 Kansas; Sweet Sixteen	W 70–57	29–4	Freedom Hall (16,756); Louisville, KY
Sun., Mar. 22, 1987	(1 SE) No. 4	vs. (6 SE) Providence; Elite Eight	L 73–88	29–5	Freedom Hall (16,944); Louisville, KY
*Non-conference game. ^{#}Rankings from AP Poll. (#) Tournament seedings in parentheses.
