= 1986–87 St. John's Redmen basketball team =

American college basketball season

1986–87 St. John's Redmen men's basketball

Lapchick Memorial Champions ECAC Holiday Festival Champions

NCAA men's Division I tournament, second round
- Conference: Big East Conference (1979–2013)
- Record: 21–9 (10–6 Big East)
- Head coach: Lou Carnesecca
- Assistant coaches: Brian Mahoney; Al LoBalbo; Ron Rutledge
- Home arena: Alumni Hall; Madison Square Garden

1986–87 Big East men's basketball standings
	Conf.				Overall
Team	W		L	PCT	W		L	PCT
No. 4 Georgetown†	12	–	4	.750	29	–	5	.853
No. 12 Pittsburgh	12	–	4	.750	25	–	8	.758
No. 10 Syracuse	12	–	4	.750	31	–	7	.816
Providence	10	–	6	.625	25	–	9	.735
St. John's	10	–	6	.625	21	–	9	.700
Villanova	6	–	10	.375	15	–	16	.484
Seton Hall	4	–	12	.250	15	–	14	.517
Boston College	3	–	13	.188	11	–	18	.379
Connecticut	3	–	13	.188	9	–	19	.321
† 1987 Big East tournament winner As of March 30, 1987; Rankings from AP Poll

The 1986–87 St. John's Redmen basketball team represented St. John's University during the 1986–87 NCAA Division I men's basketball season. The team was coached by Lou Carnesecca in his nineteenth year at the school. St. John's home games are played at Alumni Hall and Madison Square Garden and the team is a member of the Big East Conference.

In the NCAA Tournament St. John's lost in the second round to DePaul 83–75 in overtime.

== Roster ==
1986–87 St. John's Red Storm men's basketball team
Players
Coaches

Pos.	#	Name	Height	Weight	Year	Previous school	Hometown
F	4	John Hempel	6 ft 7 in (2.01 m)	—	Sr	Union Catholic/UMass	Linden, NJ
G	5	Marcus Broadnax	6 ft 2 in (1.88 m)	—	Fr	Fort Walton Beach	Fort Walton Beach, FL
C	10	Terry Bross	6 ft 9 in (2.06 m)	—	Jr	Immaculata	Somerville, NJ
F/C	11	Jayson Williams (I)	6 ft 8 in (2.03 m)	—	Fr	Christ the King	New York, NY
G	13	Mark Jackson (C)	6 ft 3 in (1.91 m)	—	Sr	Bishop Loughlin	St. Albans, NY
C	14	Marco Baldi	6 ft 11 in (2.11 m)	—	So	Long Island Lutheran	Aosta, Italy
G	15	Kevin Fitzpatrick	6 ft 1 in (1.85 m)	—	So	St. Francis Prep	Jackson Heights, NY
G	22	Elander Lewis	6 ft 3 in (1.91 m)	—	Fr	Albany High School	Albany, NY
G/F	23	Matt Brust	6 ft 3 in (1.91 m)	—	RS So	Babylon/North Carolina	Babylon, NY
G/F	30	Willie Glass (C)	6 ft 6 in (1.98 m)	—	Sr	Atlantic City	Atlantic City, NJ
F	31	Shelton Jones	6 ft 9 in (2.06 m)	—	Jr	Amityville Memorial	Amityville, NY
G	40	Steve Shurina	6 ft 4 in (1.93 m)	—	Jr	St. Francis Prep	Woodside, NY

Head coach

- Lou Carnesecca (St. John's, '50)

Assistant coach(es)

- Brian Mahoney
- Al LoBalbo
- Ron Rutledge

Legend

- (C) Team captain
- (S) Suspended
- (I) Ineligible
- (W) Walk-on
- Injured
- Current redshirt

== Schedule and results ==
Date time, TV	Rank^{#}	Opponent^{#}	Result	Record	Site city, state
Regular season
11/28/86*		Southern; Lapchick Tournament Opening Round	W 126–81	1–0	Alumni Hall; Queens, NY
11/29/86*		Youngstown State; Lapchick Tournament Championship	W 75-65	2-0	Alumni Hall; Queens, NY
12/02/86*		Fordham	W 80-61	3-0	Alumni Hall; Queens, NY
12/06/86*		Wagner	W 102-69	4-0	Alumni Hall; Queens, NY
12/11/86		Seton Hall	W 72-69	5-0 (1-0)	Alumni Hall; Queens, NY
12/13/86*		No. 11 UCLA	W 70-63	6-0	Madison Square Garden; New York, NY
12/20/86*	No. 15	at Niagara	W 66-58	7-0	Buffalo Memorial Auditorium; Buffalo, NY
12/27/86*	No. 15	Virginia; ECAC Holiday Festival Semifinal	W 64-58	8-0	Madison Square Garden; New York, NY
12/29/86*	No. 15	No. 19 Georgia Tech; ECAC Holiday Festival Championship	W 62-53	9-0	Madison Square Garden; New York, NY
01/04/87	No. 10	at Villanova	L 54-62	9-1 (1-1)	du Pont Pavilion; Villanova, PA
01/07/87	No. 10	at No. 16 Georgetown	L 46-60	9-2 (1-2)	Capital Centre; Landover, MD
01/10/87	No. 10	Boston College	W 62-58	10-2 (2-2)	Alumni Hall; Queens, NY
01/14/87*	No. 13	Brooklyn College	W 70-48	11-2	Alumni Hall; Queens, NY
01/17/87	No. 13	at Connecticut	W 69-54	12-2 (3-2)	Hartford Civic Center; Hartford, CT
01/19/87	No. 13	at No. 18 Pittsburgh	W 63-62	13-2 (4-2)	Fitzgerald Field House; Pittsburgh, PA
01/24/87	No. 14	at No. 7 Syracuse	L 63-64	13-3 (4-3)	Carrier Dome; Syracuse, NY
01/27/87	No. 15	Villanova	W 61-58	14-3 (5-3)	Alumni Hall; Queens, NY
01/31/87	No. 15	at Providence	L 81-93 ^{OT}	14-4 (5-4)	Providence Civic Center; Providence, RI
02/02/87	No. 15	No. 11 Georgetown	W 67-65 ^{OT}	15-4 (6-4)	Madison Square Garden; New York, NY
02/06/87	No. 19	at Boston College	W 65-50	16-4 (7-4)	Boston Garden; Boston, MA
02/10/87	No. 16	at Seton Hall	W 60-57 ^{OT}	17-4 (8-4)	Meadowlands Arena; East Rutherford, NJ
02/14/87	No. 16	No. 20 Providence	L 78-79	17-5 (8-5)	Alumni Hall; Queens, NY
02/16/87*	No. 16	Fairleigh Dickinson	W 63-59	18-5	Madison Square Garden; New York, NY
02/18/87	No. 20	Connecticut	W 76-55	19-5 (9-5)	Alumni Hall; Queens, NY
02/21/87*	No. 20	No. 15 Kansas	L 60-62	19-6	Madison Square Garden; New York, NY
02/25/87		No. 11 Syracuse	L 80-88	19-7 (9-6)	Madison Square Garden; New York, NY
02/28/87		No. 9 Pittsburgh	W 76-74	20-7 (10-6)	Alumni Hall; Queens, NY
Big East tournament
03/06/87		vs. Providence; Big East tournament Quarterfinal	L 51-80	20-8	Madison Square Garden; New York, NY
NCAA Tournament
03/13/87*		vs. (11) Wichita State; NCAA First Round	W 57-55	21-8	Rosemont Horizon; Rosemont, IL
03/15/87*		at No. 5 (3) DePaul; NCAA Second Round	L 75-83 ^{OT}	21-9	Rosemont Horizon; Rosemont, IL
*Non-conference game. ^{#}Rankings from AP Poll. (#) Tournament seedings in parentheses.

== Awards and honors ==
- Mark Jackson – Consensus Second-team All-American

== Team players drafted into the NBA ==
Round	Pick	Player	NBA club
1	18	Mark Jackson	New York Knicks
3	69	Willie Glass	Los Angeles Lakers
