= 1986–87 North Carolina A&T Aggies men's basketball team =

American college basketball season

1986–87 North Carolina A&T Aggies men's basketball

MEAC tournament champions

NCAA tournament, First Round
- Conference: Mid-Eastern Athletic Conference
- Record: 24–6 (12–2 MEAC)
- Head coach: Don Corbett (8th season)
- Home arena: Corbett Sports Center

1986–87 MEAC men's basketball standings
	Conf.				Overall
Team	W		L	PCT	W		L	PCT
Howard	13	–	1	.929	24	–	4	.857
North Carolina A&T †	12	–	2	.857	24	–	6	.800
South Carolina State	9	–	5	.643	14	–	15	.483
Coppin State	7	–	6	.538	8	–	19	.296
Bethune–Cookman	6	–	8	.429	10	–	19	.345
Morgan State	5	–	9	.357	8	–	20	.286
Delaware State	3	–	11	.214	4	–	24	.143
Maryland Eastern Shore	0	–	13	.000	2	–	24	.077
Florida A&M		–		–	12	–	16	.429
† 1987 MEAC tournament winner Rankings from AP Poll

The 1986–87 North Carolina A&T Aggies men's basketball team represented North Carolina Agricultural and Technical State University during the 1986–87 NCAA Division I men's basketball season. The Aggies, led by 8th-year head coach Don Corbett, played their home games at the Corbett Sports Center as members of the Mid-Eastern Athletic Conference. They finished the season 24–6, 12–2 in MEAC play to finish in first place. They were champions of the MEAC tournament, winning the championship game over Howard, to earn an automatic bid to the 1987 NCAA tournament where they were defeated by No. 2 seed Alabama, 88–71, in the opening round.

== Roster ==
1986–87 North Carolina A&T Aggies men's basketball team
Players
Coaches

Pos.	#	Name	Height	Weight	Year	Hometown
G		George Cale	6 ft 6 in (1.98 m)	—	Sr
F		Claude Williams	6 ft 7 in (2.01 m)	—	Jr

Head coach

- Don Corbett

Assistant coach(es)

Legend

- (C) Team captain
- (S) Suspended
- (I) Ineligible
- (W) Walk-on
- Injured
- Current redshirt

== Schedule and results ==
Date time, TV	Rank^{#}	Opponent^{#}	Result	Record	Site (attendance) city, state
Regular season
Dec 20, 1986*		at Southern	W 72–69	2–1	F. G. Clark Center; Baton Rouge, Louisiana
Jan 14, 1987*		at Georgia Tech	L 67–83	4–3	Alexander Memorial Coliseum; Atlanta, Georgia
1987 MEAC tournament
Mar 5, 1987*		Florida A&M; Quarterfinals	W 80–65	22–5	Greensboro Coliseum; Greensboro, North Carolina
Mar 6, 1987*		South Carolina State; Semifinals	W 73–65	23–5	Greensboro Coliseum; Greensboro, North Carolina
Mar 7, 1987*		Howard; Championship game	W 79–58	24–5	Greensboro Coliseum; Greensboro, North Carolina
1987 NCAA tournament
Mar 12, 1987*	(15 SE)	vs. (2 SE) No. 9 Alabama; First Round	L 71–88	24–6	Birmingham-Jefferson Civic Center; Birmingham, Alabama
*Non-conference game. ^{#}Rankings from AP Poll. (#) Tournament seedings in parentheses. SE=Southeast. All times are in Eastern Time.

== Awards and honors ==
- George Cale – MEAC Player of the Year
