= One Shining Moment =

Song by David Barrett

Song
- Written: 1986
- Songwriter: David Barrett

"One Shining Moment" is a song written by David Barrett that has become closely associated with the NCAA Division I men's basketball tournament. "One Shining Moment" is traditionally played at the end of CBS's and TBS's coverage of the championship game of the tournament. The song is played (as the winning team's players cut down the nets) to a montage of highlights from the tournament.

== History ==
Barrett, a singer-songwriter from Ann Arbor, Michigan, was inspired to write the song in 1986 when, after playing a set at a bar in East Lansing, Michigan, he stayed and watched Larry Bird play on TV. He wrote the song down on a napkin the next day, later stating that "the song came fully formed" and "all the lyrics just wrote themselves." He passed the song along to high school friend Armen Keteyian, an investigative journalist for CBS Sports and, at that time, Sports Illustrated, who in turn passed it to CBS Sports' creative director Doug Towey.

Towey originally planned to debut the song not after a basketball game, but after a football game, Super Bowl XXI on January 25, 1987. It was to have been the post-game montage from that contest, but the game ran past the expected airtime and CBS had a prime time show to debut in the next time slot, (Note: The show was Hard Copy, a drama that aired during the 1987 television season, and was unrelated to the later tabloid show of the same name.) so the montage was canceled. CBS then asked Barrett for permission to use the song after the 1987 NCAA Division I Men's Basketball Championship Game on March 30, in which Indiana beat Syracuse. Towey decided to use "One Shining Moment" to close CBS's coverage of the tournament. The positive public response led to it becoming an annual feature.

Since 2016, CBS and TBS broadcast the championship game in alternating years, CBS odd and TBS even. At the beginning of this arrangement there were concerns that the song might not be used in even years due to its association with CBS. However, on March 16, 2016, CBS Sports chairman Sean McManus confirmed that "One Shining Moment" would still be used during years that Turner Sports broadcasts the championship game under the consortium's contract, owing to the long-standing tradition.

In 2020, the NCAA announced a contest for basketball fans to perform their own rendition of the song, with the winning rendition to be played on TBS during the pregame show for the championship game on April 6. However, due to the cancelation of that year's tournament as a result of the COVID-19 pandemic in the United States, the contest was canceled. In addition, because the tournament was canceled, the annual playing of the song in its usual postgame context did not happen for the first time since its 1987 debut, although some teams created their own montages featuring the song. However, prior to the start of the 2021 edition of the tournament, a video featuring the best moments from every edition of the tournament, set to "One Shining Moment", was posted on the NCAA March Madness social pages on March 18, 2021, the day the tournament began.

== Composition ==
The song is in F major.

== Versions ==
The original version recorded by Barrett was used from 1987 to 1993, and briefly revived between 2000 and 2002 with a new instrumental. Versions recorded by Teddy Pendergrass (1994–1999), Luther Vandross (2003–2009, 2011–2019, 2021–present), and Ne-Yo (2016) have also been used; Vandross' version is believed to be the last song he recorded before his stroke and death.

A version by Jennifer Hudson was used for the 2010 NCAA Division I men's basketball tournament; the format of the Hudson video deviated from prior years by cutting away from the tournament highlight montage on several occasions to show footage of Hudson singing in a recording studio, similar to Vandross from the 2003 edition of the tournament, drawing criticism from some fans and viewers. In response to the criticism, the Vandross version was broadcast the following year.

On April 1, 2016, Turner Sports announced that Ne-Yo had performed a version of "One Shining Moment" that would be used on the "Team Stream" broadcasts of the championship game on TNT and TruTV, which were tailored to focus on highlights of the two participating teams, as with the game broadcasts on these channels themselves. The Vandross version was still used for the main telecast on TBS. In an effort to give the song "Turner flair" in honor of TBS's first national championship game broadcast, and to make light of the concerns regarding its use by the network, analyst Charles Barkley performed his own tongue-in-cheek cover of "One Shining Moment" in a commercial promoting that year's tournament. Another version of that commercial featured various former college basketball players and coaches singing alongside Barkley.

In 2022, Pizza Hut, the tournament's official pizza sponsor, aired a commercial featuring Craig Robinson talking with a pizza delivery driver, as well as singing "One Shining Moment".

In 2023, AT&T, the tournament's official partner, aired a commercial which shows a group of people, cheerleaders, actors and former college basketball players, including A'ja Wilson, Christian Laettner, Sabrina Ionescu, Steven Adams, Brandan Hunter-Davis and Milana Vayntrub, were singing "One Shining Moment" while walking at the beach and watching from their own AT&T phones.

== Lyrics ==
The first verse is about inspiration and hard work. The second verse deals with adversity, accompanied by highlights of injured players and missed shots. The bridge includes lines such as "Feel the beat of your heart", often shown with players thumping their chests, and "Feel the wind in your face", with video of drives towards the basket.

There is a claim that the first line in the song was changed from "The ball is kicked" to "The ball is tipped." However, Barrett said "My daughter informed me that they claim that the initial line was the ball is kicked. That's not the case. It never was. The original line was, the gun goes off...which I changed to suit the tournament. Ironically - I wrote the song about basketball (after watching Larry Bird) but for some reason (who knows what I was thinking?!?) I didn't write it into the original first line. And so having the first line fall into place as it did was poetic and true."

The Chicago White Sox used the version with "the gun goes off" to close their telecast of the final game at Comiskey Park on September 30, 1990.
