= 1986–87 Southern Jaguars basketball team =

American college basketball season

1986–87 Southern Jaguars basketball

SWAC Regular season champions SWAC tournament champions

NCAA tournament
- Conference: Southwestern Athletic Conference
- Record: 19–12 (9–5 SWAC)
- Head coach: Ben Jobe (1st season)
- Home arena: F. G. Clark Center

1986–87 SWAC men's basketball standings
	Conf.				Overall
Team	W		L	PCT	W		L	PCT
Grambling	11	–	3	.786	16	–	14	.533
Southern †	9	–	5	.643	19	–	12	.613
Mississippi Valley State	9	–	5	.643	13	–	15	.464
Jackson State	8	–	6	.571	15	–	14	.517
Alabama State	7	–	7	.500	14	–	14	.500
Texas Southern	7	–	7	.500	11	–	11	.500
Alcorn State	8	–	6	.571	15	–	14	.517
Prairie View A&M	8	–	6	.571	15	–	14	.517
† 1987 SWAC tournament winner Rankings from AP Poll

The 1986–87 Southern Jaguars basketball team represented Southern University during the 1986–87 NCAA Division I men's basketball season. The Jaguars, led by head coach Ben Jobe, played their home games at the F. G. Clark Center and were members of the Southwestern Athletic Conference. They finished the season 19–12, 9–5 in SWAC play to finish in second place. They were champions of the SWAC tournament to earn an automatic bid to the 1987 NCAA tournament where they lost in the opening round to Temple.

== Roster ==
1986–87 Southern Jaguars men's basketball team
Players	Coaches
Pos. / # / Name / Height / Weight / Year / Hometown; G / 15 / Avery Johnson / 5 ft 10 in (1.78 m) / 180 lb (82 kg) / Jr / New Orleans, Louisiana	Head coach: Ben Jobe; Assistant coach(es) Legend: (C) Team captain; (S) Suspended; (I) Ineligible; (W) Walk-on; Injured; Current redshirt

== Schedule ==
Date time, TV	Rank^{#}	Opponent^{#}	Result	Record	Site (attendance) city, state
Regular season
Nov 28, 1986*		at St. John's; Lapchick Tournament	L 81–126	0–1	Alumni Hall; Queens, New York
Nov 29, 1986*		vs. Marist; Lapchick Tournament	W 89–82	1–1	Alumni Hall; Queens, New York
Dec 1, 1986*		at No. 6 Kansas	L 69–87	1–2	Allen Fieldhouse; Lawrence, Kansas
Dec 16, 1986*		at Drake	L 58–81	1–3	Veterans Memorial Auditorium; Des Moines, Iowa
Dec 20, 1986*		North Carolina A&T	L 69–72	1–4	F. G. Clark Activity Center; Baton Rouge, Louisiana
1987 SWAC tournament
Mar 4, 1987*		vs. Alcorn State; Quarterfinals	W 103–89	17–11	Mississippi Coliseum; Biloxi, Mississippi
Mar 5, 1987*		vs. Texas Southern; Semifinals	W 100–87	18–11	Mississippi Coliseum; Biloxi, Mississippi
Mar 6, 1987*		vs. Grambling; Championship game	W 105–55	19–11	Mississippi Coliseum; Biloxi, Mississippi
1987 NCAA tournament
Mar 13, 1987*	(15 MW)	vs. (2 MW) No. 8 Temple; First Round	L 56–75	19–12	Rosemont Horizon; Rosemont, Illinois
*Non-conference game. ^{#}Rankings from AP Poll. (#) Tournament seedings in parentheses. MW=Midwest. All times are in Central Time.

== Awards and honors ==
- Avery Johnson – SWAC Player of the Year, NCAA assists leader, NCAA record single-season assists average (10.74)
