= 1986–87 Connecticut Huskies men's basketball team =

American college basketball season

1986–87 Connecticut Huskies men's basketball
- Conference: Big East Conference
- Record: 9–19 (3–13 Big East)
- Head coach: Jim Calhoun (1st season)
- Assistant coaches: Bill Cardarelli; Howie Dickenman; Dave Leitao; Glen Miller Ted Woodward
- Home arena: Hugh S. Greer Field House; Hartford Civic Center; New Haven Coliseum

1986–87 Big East men's basketball standings
	Conf.				Overall
Team	W		L	PCT	W		L	PCT
No. 4 Georgetown†	12	–	4	.750	29	–	5	.853
No. 12 Pittsburgh	12	–	4	.750	25	–	8	.758
No. 10 Syracuse	12	–	4	.750	31	–	7	.816
Providence	10	–	6	.625	25	–	9	.735
St. John's	10	–	6	.625	21	–	9	.700
Villanova	6	–	10	.375	15	–	16	.484
Seton Hall	4	–	12	.250	15	–	14	.517
Boston College	3	–	13	.188	11	–	18	.379
Connecticut	3	–	13	.188	9	–	19	.321
† 1987 Big East tournament winner As of March 30, 1987; Rankings from AP Poll

The 1986–87 Connecticut Huskies men's basketball team represented the University of Connecticut in the 1986–87 collegiate men's basketball season. The Huskies completed the season with a 9–19 overall record. The Huskies were members of the Big East Conference where they finished with a 3–13 record. The Huskies played their home games at Hugh S. Greer Field House in Storrs, Connecticut, the New Haven Coliseum in New Haven, Connecticut, and the Hartford Civic Center in Hartford, Connecticut, and they were led by first-year head coach Jim Calhoun.

== Schedule ==
Date time, TV	Rank^{#}	Opponent^{#}	Result	Record	Site (attendance) city, state
Regular Season
11/29/1986*		Massachusetts	W 58–54	1–0	Hugh S. Greer Field House (3,446); Storrs, Connecticut
12/2/1986*; WTXX		at Yale	L 75–77	1–1	Payne Whitney Gymnasium (1,079); New Haven, Connecticut
12/4/1986*; WTXX		Central Connecticut	W 62–52	2–1	Hugh S. Greer Field House (3,676); Storrs, Connecticut
12/6/1986*		No. 4 Purdue	L 70–88	2–2	Hartford Civic Center (9,155); Hartford, Connecticut
12/9/1986*; NESN		at Boston University	L 71–80	2–3	Case Gym (1,449); Boston, Massachusetts
12/11/1986*		Rhode Island	W 96–94 ^{OT}	3–3	Hugh S. Greer Field House (3,032); Storrs, Connecticut
12/13/1986; NESN		Villanova	L 51–66	3–4 (0–1)	New Haven Coliseum (7,283); New Haven, Connecticut
12/23/1986*		Fairfield	W 54–51	4–4	Hugh S. Greer Field House (2,587); Storrs, Connecticut
12/29/1986*		Hartford; Connecticut Mutual Classic	L 48–49	4–5	Hartford Civic Center (12,401); Hartford, Connecticut
12/30/1986*		Lehigh; Connecticut Mutual Classic	W 71–57	5–5	Hartford Civic Center (9,829); Hartford, Connecticut
1/3/1987; WTXX		No. 7 Syracuse; Rivalry	L 71–88	5–6 (0–2)	New Haven Coliseum (8,038); New Haven, Connecticut
1/6/1987; WTXX		at Seton Hall	W 77–68	6–6 (1–2)	Brendan Byrne Arena (5,057); East Rutherford, New Jersey
1/14/1987; WTXX		at Providence	L 89–103	6–7 (1–3)	Providence Civic Center (10,029); Providence, Rhode Island
1/17/1987		No. 13 St. John's	L 54–69	6–8 (1–4)	Hartford Civic Center (10,039); Hartford, Connecticut
1/21/1987; ESPN		at No. 15 Georgetown; Rivalry	L 51–65	6–9 (1–5)	Capital Centre (7,353); Landover, Maryland
1/24/1987		Providence	L 53–61	6–10 (1–6)	Hartford Civic Center (10,479); Hartford, Connecticut
1/27/1987; ESPN		at Boston College	W 66–60	7–10 (2–6)	Roberts Center (3,357); Boston, Massachusetts
1/31/1987; WTXX		at No. 17 Pittsburgh	L 52–73	7–11 (2–7)	Civic Arena (6,798); Pittsburgh, Pennsylvania
2/3/1987*		at St. Peter's	L 50–75	7–12	Yanitelli Center (8,741); Jersey City, New Jersey
2/5/1987*		Holy Cross	W 64–54	8–12	Hugh S. Greer Field House (3,496); Storrs, Connecticut
2/7/1987; WTXX		at No. 11 Syracuse; Rivalry	L 53–59	8–13 (2–8)	Carrier Dome (28,357); Syracuse, New York
2/11/1987; NESN		No. 13 Georgetown; Rivalry	L 50–78	8–14 (2–9)	Hartford Civic Center (11,035); Hartford, Connecticut
2/14/1987; WTXX		at Villanova	L 58–67	8–15 (2–10)	The Pavilion (6,500); Villanova, Pennsylvania
2/18/1987; WTXX		at No. 20 St. John's	L 55–76	8–16 (2–11)	Carnesecca Arena (6,008); New York City, New York
2/21/1987		No. 8 Pittsburgh	L 66–76	8–17 (2–12)	Hartford Civic Center (8,964); Hartford, Connecticut
2/26/1987		Boston College	L 60–66	8–18 (2–13)	Hartford Civic Center (8,340); Hartford, Connecticut
2/28/1987		Seton Hall	W 56–54	9–18 (3–13)	Hartford Civic Center (8,130); Hartford, Connecticut
Big East tournament
3/5/1987		vs. Boston College; First Round	L 59–61	9–19	Madison Square Garden (19,591); New York City, New York
*Non-conference game. ^{#}Rankings from AP Poll. (#) Tournament seedings in parentheses. All times are in Eastern Time.

Schedule Source:
