= 1986–87 Providence Friars men's basketball team =

American college basketball season

1986–87 Providence Friars men's basketball

NCAA tournament, Final Four
- Conference: Big East Conference
- Record: 25–9 (10–6 Big East)
- Head coach: Rick Pitino (2nd season)
- Assistant coaches: Gordon Chiesa; Stu Jackson; Herb Sendek; Jeff Van Gundy (GA)
- Home arena: Providence Civic Center

1986–87 Big East men's basketball standings
	Conf.				Overall
Team	W		L	PCT	W		L	PCT
No. 4 Georgetown†	12	–	4	.750	29	–	5	.853
No. 12 Pittsburgh	12	–	4	.750	25	–	8	.758
No. 10 Syracuse	12	–	4	.750	31	–	7	.816
Providence	10	–	6	.625	25	–	9	.735
St. John's	10	–	6	.625	21	–	9	.700
Villanova	6	–	10	.375	15	–	16	.484
Seton Hall	4	–	12	.250	15	–	14	.517
Boston College	3	–	13	.188	11	–	18	.379
Connecticut	3	–	13	.188	9	–	19	.321
† 1987 Big East tournament winner As of March 30, 1987; Rankings from AP Poll

The 1986–87 Providence Friars men's basketball team represented Providence College during the 1986–87 NCAA Division I men's basketball season. Led by second-year head coach Rick Pitino, the Friars finished the season 25–9 (10–6 Big East) and made a Cinderella run through the NCAA tournament to the Final Four.

== Roster ==
1986–87 Providence Friars men's basketball team
Players
Coaches

Pos.	#	Name	Height	Weight	Year	Hometown
G	10	Ryan Ford	6 ft 0 in (1.83 m)	185 lb (84 kg)	So	Olean, New York
G	12	Delray Brooks	6 ft 4 in (1.93 m)	199 lb (90 kg)	Jr	Michigan City, Indiana
F	15	David Kipfer	6 ft 7 in (2.01 m)	212 lb (96 kg)	Sr	Kitchener, Ontario
G	20	Carlton Screen	6 ft 0 in (1.83 m)	158 lb (72 kg)	Fr	Brooklyn, New York
G	23	Ernie Lewis	6 ft 4 in (1.93 m)	182 lb (83 kg)	Sr	Germantown, Pennsylvania
F	25	Abdul Shamsid-Deen	6 ft 10 in (2.08 m)	209 lb (95 kg)	Fr	Staten Island, New York
C	30	Marty Conlon	6 ft 10 in (2.08 m)	209 lb (95 kg)	Fr	Bronxville, New York
F	32	David Snedeker	6 ft 8 in (2.03 m)	215 lb (98 kg)	Jr	Springfield, Illinois
G	34	Billy Donovan	6 ft 0 in (1.83 m)	171 lb (78 kg)	Sr	Rockville Centre, New York
F	41	Darryl Wright	6 ft 5 in (1.96 m)	187 lb (85 kg)	So	New York City, New York
F	42	Bryan Benham	6 ft 3 in (1.91 m)	195 lb (88 kg)	So	Cartersville, Georgia
C	44	Steve Wright	6 ft 9 in (2.06 m)	209 lb (95 kg)	Jr	Syracuse, New York
C	50	Jacek Duda	6 ft 11 in (2.11 m)	233 lb (106 kg)	Sr	Central Falls, Rhode Island

Head coach

- Rick Pitino (UMass)

Assistant coach(es)

- Gordon Chiesa
- Herb Sendek
- Stu Jackson
- Jeff Van Gundy

Legend

- (C) Team captain
- (S) Suspended
- (I) Ineligible
- (W) Walk-on
- Injured
- Current redshirt

== Schedule and results ==
Date time, TV	Rank^{#}	Opponent^{#}	Result	Record	Site city, state
Regular season
Nov 28, 1986		American; Fleet Classic	W 104–82	1-0	Providence Civic Center; Providence, RI
Nov 29, 1986		Tulsa; Fleet Classic	L 74–80	1-1	Providence Civic Center; Providence, RI
Dec 2, 1986		at Holy Cross	W 90–65	2-1	Hart Center; Worcester, MA
Dec 6, 1986		Rhode Island	W 100–90	3-1	Providence Civic Center; Providence, RI
Dec 9, 1986		at Brown	W 96–65	4-1	Marvel Gymnasium; Providence, RI
Dec 11, 1986		Siena	W 75–64	5-1	Providence Civic Center; Providence, RI
Dec 20, 1986		Rider	W 106–66	6-1	Providence Civic Center; Providence, RI
Dec 22, 1986		Howard	W 94–83	7-1	Providence Civic Center; Providence, RI
Dec 27, 1986		Maine	W 113–87	8-1	Providence Civic Center; Providence, RI
Dec 29, 1986		Hofstra	W 97–61	9-1	Providence Civic Center; Providence, RI
Jan 3, 1987		No. 17 Pittsburgh	L 67–76	9-2 (0-1)	Fitzgerald Field House; Pittsburgh, PA
Jan 5, 1987		No. 7 Syracuse	L 85–89	9-3 (0-2)	Providence Civic Center; Providence, RI
Jan 10, 1987		Villanova	W 96–78	10-3 (1-2)	The Pavilion; Philadelphia, PA
Jan 14, 1987		Connecticut	W 103–89	11-3 (2-2)	Providence Civic Center; Providence, RI
Jan 17, 1987		Boston College	W 96–78	12-3 (3-2)	Providence Civic Center; Providence, RI
Jan 20, 1987*		at Miami (FL)	W 92–88	13-3	Knight Center; Miami, FL
Jan 24, 1987		Connecticut	W 61–53	14-3 (4-2)	Hartford Civic Center; Hartford, CT
Jan 28, 1987		No. 11 Georgetown	W 82–79	15-3 (5-2)	Providence Civic Center; Providence, RI
Jan 31, 1987		No. 15 St. John's	W 93–81	16-3 (6-2)	Providence Civic Center; Providence, RI
Feb 3, 1987	No. 17	at Boston College	L 66–67	16-4 (6-3)	Roberts Center; Boston, MA
Feb 7, 1987	No. 17	No. 13 Pittsburgh	L 81–87	16-5 (6-4)	Providence Civic Center; Providence, RI
Feb 14, 1987	No. 20	No. 16 St. John's	W 79–78	17-5 (7-4)	Madison Square Garden; New York, NY
Feb 17, 1987	No. 19	Seton Hall	W 91–87	18-5 (8-4)	Providence Civic Center; Providence, RI
Feb 19, 1987	No. 19	at No. 9 Syracuse	L 81–90	18-6 (8-5)	Carrier Dome; Syracuse, NY
Feb 25, 1987	No. 20	vs. Seton Hall	W 85–72	19-6 (9-5)	Brendan Byrne Arena; East Rutherford, NJ
Feb 28, 1987	No. 20	No. 8 Georgetown	L 79–90	19-7 (9-6)	Capital Centre; Washington, D.C.
Mar 2, 1987		Villanova	W 97–80	20–7 (10–6)	Providence Civic Center; Providence, RI
Big East tournament
Mar 6, 1987*		vs. St. John's; Big East tournament Quarterfinal	W 80–51	21–7	Madison Square Garden; New York, NY
Mar 7, 1987*		vs. No. 7 Georgetown; Big East tournament Semifinal	L 66–84	21–8	Madison Square Garden; New York, NY
NCAA Tournament
Mar 12, 1987*; CBS	(6)	vs. (11) UAB; NCAA tournament first round	W 90–68	22–8	Birmingham–Jefferson Civic Center; Birmingham, AL
Mar 14, 1987*; CBS	(6)	vs. (14) Austin Peay; NCAA tournament second round	W 90–87 ^{OT}	23–8	Birmingham–Jefferson Civic Center; Birmingham, AL
Mar 19, 1987*; CBS	(6)	vs. (2) No. 9 Alabama; Southeast Regional semifinal	W 103–82	24–8	Freedom Hall; Louisville, KY
Mar 21, 1987*; CBS	(6)	vs. (1) No. 4 Georgetown; Southeast Regional final	W 88–73	25–8	Freedom Hall (16,944); Louisville, KY
Mar 28, 1987*; CBS	(SE 6)	vs. (E 2) No. 10 Syracuse; Final Four	L 63–77	25–9	Louisiana Superdome (64,959); New Orleans, LA
*Non-conference game. ^{#}Rankings from AP Poll. (#) Tournament seedings in parentheses.
