= Jerome Lane =

American basketball player (born 1966)

Personal information
- Born: December 4, 1966 (age 59) Akron, Ohio, U.S.
- Listed height: 6 ft 6 in (1.98 m)
- Listed weight: 230 lb (104 kg)

Career information
- High school: St. Vincent–St. Mary (Akron, Ohio)
- College: Pittsburgh (1985–1988)
- NBA draft: 1988: 1st round, 23rd overall pick
- Drafted by: Denver Nuggets
- Playing career: 1988–2000
- Position: Power forward / small forward
- Number: 35, 33, 34, 30

Career history
- 1988–1991: Denver Nuggets
- 1992: Indiana Pacers
- 1992: Milwaukee Bucks
- 1992: Oximesa Granada
- 1992–1993: Cleveland Cavaliers
- 1993–1994: La Crosse Catbirds
- 1994: Rapid City Thrillers
- 1994: Formula Shell
- 1994–1996: Oklahoma City Cavalry
- 1996–1997: Fórum Filatélico
- 1997–1998: Caja Cantabria
- 1998–2000: Idaho Stampede

Career highlights
- All-CBA First Team (1996); All-CBA Second Team (1995); 4× CBA rebounding leader (1994–1996, 1999); Consensus second-team All-American (1988); Third-team All-American – AP, NABC, UPI (1987); NCAA rebounding leader (1987); First-team All-Big East (1987); Third-team Parade All-American (1985); McDonald's All-American (1985)

Career NBA statistics
- Points: 1,154 (5.3 ppg)
- Rebounds: 1,258 (5.8 rpg)
- Assists: 322 (1.5 apg)
- Stats at NBA.com
- Stats at Basketball Reference
Medals
Men's basketball
Representing United States
Pan American Games
Silver medal – second place	1987 Indianapolis	Team competition

Jerome Lane Sr. (born December 4, 1966) is an American former professional basketball player who played six seasons in the National Basketball Association (NBA). Lane played college basketball for the University of Pittsburgh, where he was an All-American and led the NCAA in rebounding as a sophomore.

== High school career ==
Born in Akron, Ohio, Lane played shooting guard for Saint Vincent–Saint Mary High School and appeared in the McDonald's All-American Game.

== College career ==
He joined the Pittsburgh Panthers in 1985–86 as a 170-pound (77 kg) freshman. By his junior season, the 6-foot-6-inch (1.98 m) forward was 60 pounds heavier. In 1986–87, his 13.5 rebounds per game made him the first player 6'6" or shorter to lead the country in rebounds per game (13.5) since Niagara's Alex Ellis in 1957–58. He left school after leading the Big East Conference in rebounding during the 1987–88 season.

== Professional career ==
Lane was selected in the first round of the 1988 NBA draft by the Denver Nuggets with the 23rd pick overall. Lane played in the NBA for five seasons with the Nuggets, Indiana Pacers, Milwaukee Bucks and Cleveland Cavaliers. Lane shined in the Continental Basketball Association (CBA) as a star for the Oklahoma City Cavalry. He was an all-star in the league from 1994 to 1996 and led the league in rebounding in 1995 (11.8) and 1996 (16.8). Lane was selected to the All-CBA First Team in 1996 and Second Team in 1995. After a successful stint in Spain he returned to the CBA and led the league once more in rebounding in 1999, pulling down 14.5 rebounds per game for the Idaho Stampede.

== Career statistics ==
Legend
GP	Games played	GS	Games started	MPG	Minutes per game
FG%	Field goal percentage	3P%	3-point field goal percentage	FT%	Free throw percentage
RPG	Rebounds per game	APG	Assists per game	SPG	Steals per game
BPG	Blocks per game	PPG	Points per game	**Bold**	Career high

=== Regular season ===
Year	Team	GP	GS	MPG	FG%	3P%	FT%	RPG	APG	SPG	BPG	PPG
1988–89	Denver	54	1	10.2	.426	.000	.384	3.7	1.1	0.4	0.1	4.8
1989–90	Denver	**67**	**46**	14.3	.469	.000	.367	5.4	1.6	**0.8**	**0.3**	5.0
1990–91	Denver	62	25	**22.3**	.438	**.250**	.411	**9.3**	**2.0**	**0.8**	0.2	**7.5**
1991–92	Denver	9	5	15.7	.250	.000	.421	4.9	1.4	0.2	0.1	3.1
1991–92	Indiana	3	0	10.0	.600	.000	.000	6.0	1.3	0.0	0.0	2.0
1991–92	Milwaukee	2	0	3.0	**1.000**	.000	**.500**	2.0	0.0	0.0	0.0	1.5
1992–93	Cleveland	21	2	7.1	.500	.000	.250	2.5	0.8	0.6	0.1	2.8
Career		218	79	14.7	.441	.063	.379	5.8	1.5	0.6	0.2	5.3

=== Playoffs ===
Year	Team	GP	GS	MPG	FG%	3P%	FT%	RPG	APG	SPG	BPG	PPG
1988–89	Denver	**2**	0	**10.5**	**.286**	.000	**1.000**	**3.0**	**1.0**	0.0	0.0	**3.0**
1989–90	Denver	**2**	**2**	7.0	.000	.000	.500	0.5	**1.0**	0.0	0.0	0.5
Career		4	2	8.8	.200	.000	.750	1.8	1.0	0.0	0.0	1.8

=== College ===
Year	Team	GP	GS	MPG	FG%	3P%	FT%	RPG	APG	SPG	BPG	PPG
1985–86	Pitt	29	–	24.5	.470	–	**.655**	5.1	1.6	0.8	**0.4**	9.1
1986–87	Pitt	**33**	–	**35.4**	**.568**	**.500**	.603	**13.5**	2.2	**1.3**	**0.4**	**15.8**
1987–88	Pitt	31	–	35.2	.513	.000	.615	12.2	**2.8**	**1.3**	0.2	13.9
Career		93	–	31.9	.525	.267	.618	10.4	2.2	1.1	0.4	13.1

== Playing style ==
Although best known for his rebounding skills, Lane was also an adept ball handler. His jump shot and foul shooting were never consistent. He was voted as the best rebounder in the history of the ACB.

== Shattering the backboard ==
On January 25, 1988, in a college basketball game featuring Lane's Pittsburgh team playing Providence on a national ESPN television broadcast, Lane broke the glass backboard with a one-handed dunk with Sean Miller assisting on the play. Often referred to simply as "The Dunk", the play was famously called by color analyst Bill Raftery when he exclaimed "Send it in, Jerome!!" The play is on ESPN's list of the "100 Greatest Sports Highlights" and has been the subject of numerous articles even decades later.

== Personal life ==
His son Jerome Lane Jr. is a wide receiver who once signed with the New York Giants of the National Football League (NFL).

== See also ==
- List of NCAA Division I men's basketball season rebounding leaders
