= Dean Garrett =

American basketball player

Personal information
- Born: November 27, 1966 (age 59) Los Angeles, California, U.S.
- Listed height: 6 ft 11 in (2.11 m)
- Listed weight: 225 lb (102 kg)

Career information
- High school: San Clemente (San Clemente, California)
- College: CC of San Francisco (1984–1986); Indiana (1986–1988)
- NBA draft: 1988: 2nd round, 38th overall pick
- Drafted by: Phoenix Suns
- Playing career: 1989–2002
- Position: Center
- Number: 22, 21

Career history
- 1989–1990: Jollycolombani Forlì
- 1990–1993: Panasonic Reggio Calabria
- 1993–1995: Scavolini Pesaro
- 1995–1996: P.A.O.K.
- 1996–1997: Minnesota Timberwolves
- 1997–1998: Denver Nuggets
- 1999–2002: Minnesota Timberwolves
- 2002: Golden State Warriors

Career highlights
- Greek League All-Star (1996 I); NCAA champion (1987); Big Ten Freshman of the Year (1987)

Career NBA statistics
- Points: 1,737 (4.8 ppg)
- Rebounds: 1,810 (5.0 rpg)
- Blocks: 372 (1.0 bpg)
- Stats at NBA.com
- Stats at Basketball Reference
Medals
Representing United States
Men's basketball
Pan American Games
Silver medal – second place	1987 Indianapolis	Team competition

Dean Heath Garrett (born November 27, 1966) is an American former professional basketball player. At a height of 6 feet 11 inches (211 cm) tall, he played at the center position.

== College career ==
Garrett attended San Clemente High School, in San Clemente, California, where he earned All-Conference, All-County, and All-Southern California honors, as a senior, in the 1983–84 season. After high school, Garrett played collegiately at the City College of San Francisco, from 1984 to 1986, where he led his team to the state finals, where they were defeated by Sacramento City College. The winning continued for Garrett, when he accepted a scholarship to Indiana University, where he was coached by Bob Knight, and helped the Hoosiers win the 1987 NCAA Division I Tournament.

== Professional career ==
Garrett was selected by the Phoenix Suns with the 38th overall pick in the second round of the 1988 NBA draft. He did not play in the NBA for the first eight seasons of his career, playing in Italy and Greece instead. Prior to the NBA's 1996–97 season, Garrett signed as a free agent with the Minnesota Timberwolves, and played in the NBA for the next five seasons. He played for the Denver Nuggets (1997–98), a second stint with the Timberwolves from (1998–99 to 2001–02), and the Golden State Warriors (2001–02,) after he was traded mid-season. During those six seasons, Garrett played in a total of 359 NBA regular season games, in which he averaged 19.4 minutes, 4.8 points, 5.0 rebounds, and 1.0 blocks per game, with a 0.480 field goal shooting percentage.

== NBA career statistics ==
Legend
GP	Games played	GS	Games started	MPG	Minutes per game
FG%	Field goal percentage	3P%	3-point field goal percentage	FT%	Free throw percentage
RPG	Rebounds per game	APG	Assists per game	SPG	Steals per game
BPG	Blocks per game	PPG	Points per game	**Bold**	Career high
*	Led the league

=== Regular season ===
Year	Team	GP	GS	MPG	FG%	3P%	FT%	RPG	APG	SPG	BPG	PPG
1996–97	Minnesota	68	47	24.5	**.573**	–	.696	7.3	.6	.6	1.4	**8.0**
1997–98	Denver	**82***	**82***	**32.1**	.428	–	.648	**7.9**	**1.1**	**.7**	**1.6**	7.3
1998–99	Minnesota	49	37	21.5	.502	–	**.745**	5.2	.6	.6	.9	5.5
1999–00	Minnesota	56	23	10.8	.444	–	.692	2.5	.3	.1	.7	2.0
2000–01	Minnesota	70	21	11.9	.481	–	.692	3.1	.3	.4	.7	2.5
2001–02	Minnesota	29	0	5.1	.350	–	.000	1.6	.1	.2	.3	1.0
2001–02	Golden State	5	0	6.4	.267	–	–	2.0	.2	.4	.2	1.6
Career		359	210	19.4	.480	–	.677	5.0	.6	.5	1.0	4.8

=== Playoffs ===
Year	Team	GP	GS	MPG	FG%	3P%	FT%	RPG	APG	SPG	BPG	PPG
1997	Minnesota	3	**3**	**39.3**	.517	–	.800	**11.7**	**1.3**	**.7**	**1.0**	**12.7**
1999	Minnesota	**4**	**3**	23.0	**.556**	–	.400	4.0	**1.3**	.5	.8	5.5
2000	Minnesota	3	0	5.3	.500	–	.500	.7	.0	.0	.3	1.0
2001	Minnesota	3	2	13.7	.333	–	**.833**	3.0	.0	.3	.3	4.3
Career		13	8	20.5	.492	–	.696	4.8	.7	.4	.6	5.8

== Post-playing career ==
After his retirement from playing professional basketball, Garrett was living in Las Vegas, when some of his friends from Minneapolis contacted him about a business proposition in Minnesota. Garrett then moved to Minnesota, and he became a part owner in three businesses: a restaurant, a nightclub, and a Nextel wireless retail store.

== Other ==
Garrett appeared as a contestant on a 1984 episode of The Price Is Right, winning a collection of lamps valued at $525.
