= 1986–87 Pittsburgh Panthers men's basketball team =

American college basketball season

1986–87 Pittsburgh Panthers men's basketball

Big East Regular Season Co-Champions

NCAA tournament, second round, L 93–96 vs. Oklahoma
- Conference: Big East Conference (1979–2013)

Ranking
- Coaches: No. 12
- AP: No. 12
- Record: 25–8 (12–4 Big East)
- Head coach: Paul Evans (1st season)
- Assistant coaches: Norm Law (1st season); Mark Coleman (1st season); John Calipari (2nd season)
- Home arena: Fitzgerald Field House (Capacity: 4,122)

1986–87 Big East men's basketball standings
	Conf.				Overall
Team	W		L	PCT	W		L	PCT
No. 4 Georgetown†	12	–	4	.750	29	–	5	.853
No. 12 Pittsburgh	12	–	4	.750	25	–	8	.758
No. 10 Syracuse	12	–	4	.750	31	–	7	.816
Providence	10	–	6	.625	25	–	9	.735
St. John's	10	–	6	.625	21	–	9	.700
Villanova	6	–	10	.375	15	–	16	.484
Seton Hall	4	–	12	.250	15	–	14	.517
Boston College	3	–	13	.188	11	–	18	.379
Connecticut	3	–	13	.188	9	–	19	.321
† 1987 Big East tournament winner As of March 30, 1987; Rankings from AP Poll

The 1986–87 Pittsburgh Panthers men's basketball team represented the University of Pittsburgh in the 1986–87 NCAA Division I men's basketball season. Led by first year head coach Paul Evans, the Panthers finished with a record of 25–8. They received an at-large bid to the 1987 NCAA Division I men's basketball tournament where, as a #3 seed, they lost in the second round to Oklahoma.
