= 1986–87 Syracuse Orangemen basketball team =

American college basketball season

1986–87 Syracuse Orangemen basketball

NCAA tournament, Runner-up Big East regular season co-champions

National Championship Game, L 73-74 vs. Indiana
- Conference: Big East Conference

Ranking
- Coaches: No. 10
- AP: No. 10
- Record: 31–7 (12–4 Big East)
- Head coach: Jim Boeheim (11th season)
- Assistant coaches: Bernie Fine (11th season); Wayne Morgan (3rd season); Barry Copeland (1st season)
- Home arena: Carrier Dome

1986–87 Big East men's basketball standings
	Conf.				Overall
Team	W		L	PCT	W		L	PCT
No. 4 Georgetown†	12	–	4	.750	29	–	5	.853
No. 12 Pittsburgh	12	–	4	.750	25	–	8	.758
No. 10 Syracuse	12	–	4	.750	31	–	7	.816
Providence	10	–	6	.625	25	–	9	.735
St. John's	10	–	6	.625	21	–	9	.700
Villanova	6	–	10	.375	15	–	16	.484
Seton Hall	4	–	12	.250	15	–	14	.517
Boston College	3	–	13	.188	11	–	18	.379
Connecticut	3	–	13	.188	9	–	19	.321
† 1987 Big East tournament winner As of March 30, 1987; Rankings from AP Poll

The 1986–87 Syracuse Orangemen basketball team represented Syracuse University in the 1986–87 NCAA Division I men's basketball season. The head coach was Jim Boeheim, serving for his 11th year. The team played home games at the Carrier Dome in Syracuse, New York. The team finished with a 31–7 (12–4) record while making it to the championship game of the NCAA tournament.

The team was led by junior Rony Seikaly and sophomore Sherman Douglas. Seniors Greg Monroe and Howard Triche, and freshman Derrick Coleman also played key roles.

== Season recap ==
After the graduation of Rafael Addison and Wendell Alexis and the early departure of Dwayne Washington, expectations for the season were low.

But behind the surprising Sherman Douglas and Derrick Coleman, and despite an early injury to Rony Seikaly, Syracuse won its first 15 games en route to winning the Big East regular season title. The season included thrilling victories over St. Johns (64–63) and Seton Hall (84–80).

Syracuse would defeat Villanova and Pittsburgh to advance to the Big East Championship game before falling to Georgetown, 69–59.

== NCAA tournament ==
After finishing the regular season at 28–6, the Orangemen earned a 2 seed in the East region of the NCAA tournament.

Syracuse played its first two tournament games at home in the Carrier Dome. The Orangemen defeated 15 seed Georgia Southern 79–73 and 10 seed Western Kentucky 104–86 to advance to the Sweet 16.

After winning its first two tournament games at the Carrier Dome, the Orangemen moved on to the Sweet 16 held at The Meadowlands in East Rutherford, New Jersey. The Orangemen defeated 6 seed Florida 87–81.

Syracuse faced 1 seed North Carolina in the regional finals. The Orangemen had to fight off the Tar Heels down the stretch as they fought to overcome a 15 point Syracuse lead. However, Syracuse was able to hold off the Tar Heels, winning 79–75 to advance to the Final Four.

In the semi-final game, the Orangemen defeated fellow Big East team and 6 seed Providence 77–63. The Orangemen had an easy time with the Friars, out rebounding them 53–35 with Coleman, Douglas, and Triche each having at least 10 rebounds. The Orangemen held the Friars to 36.4% shooting leading Coach Boeheim to credit the team's defense for the win. The Orangemen also held Providence's leading scorer and future Florida Gators head coach Billy Donovan to 8 points, 18 under his season average.

In the championship game at the Superdome in New Orleans, Louisiana, the Orangemen matched up against the Indiana Hoosiers coached by Bobby Knight. The game was a back and forth battle down until the final whistle. The Orangemen had a one point lead with 28 seconds left in the second half when Coleman missed the front end of a one and one. Indiana grabbed the rebound and tournament MOP Keith Smart made a jumper from the corner with just seconds left on the clock to give the Hoosiers a one point lead and the National Championship.

=== NCAA Tournament school records ===
The team's 104 point outburst against Western Kentucky in the second round is tied for the most points in a tournament game.

Rony Seikaly's 138 points is a school record and was tied with Indiana's Steve Alford for most in that year's tournament. He also set records for field goals and free throws made with 53 and 51, respectively.

Derrick Coleman's 19 rebounds against Indiana is a school record that still stands as of 2008. He also set tournament records for rebounds and blocked shots with 73 and 16, respectively.

Sherman Douglas set a record for assists with 49.

== Roster ==
1986–87 Syracuse Orange men's basketball team
Players
Coaches

Pos.	#	Name	Height	Weight	Year	Hometown
C	4	Rony Seikaly	6 ft 10 in (2.08 m)	240 lb (109 kg)	Jr	Athens, Greece
G	11	Greg Monroe	6 ft 3 in (1.91 m)	195 lb (88 kg)	Sr	Rochester, New York
G	20	Sherman Douglas	6 ft 0 in (1.83 m)	170 lb (77 kg)	So	Washington, D.C.
G	21	Matt Roe	6 ft 5 in (1.96 m)	175 lb (79 kg)	Fr	Manlius, New York
G	24	Joel Katz	5 ft 11 in (1.8 m)	182 lb (83 kg)	Sr	San Juan, Puerto Rico
F	25	Howard Triche	6 ft 5 in (1.96 m)	215 lb (98 kg)	Sr	Syracuse, New York
F/C	30	Derek Brower	6 ft 9 in (2.06 m)	230 lb (104 kg)	Jr	North Babylon, New York
G	32	Stephen Thompson	6 ft 4 in (1.93 m)	175 lb (79 kg)	Fr	Los Angeles, California
F	33	Herman Harried	6 ft 7 in (2.01 m)	210 lb (95 kg)	So	Baltimore, Maryland
C	41	Erik Rogers	6 ft 10 in (2.08 m)	205 lb (93 kg)	Fr	Temple City, California
PF	42	Rodney Walker	6 ft 9 in (2.06 m)	—	So
F	43	Keith Hughes	6 ft 7 in (2.01 m)	205 lb (93 kg)	Fr	Carteret, New Jersey
F	44	Derrick Coleman	6 ft 9 in (2.06 m)	215 lb (98 kg)	Fr	Detroit, Michigan
F	50	Joey Kohm	6 ft 3 in (1.91 m)	205 lb (93 kg)	Sr	Ithaca, New York

Head coach

- Jim Boeheim (Syracuse)

Assistant coach(es)

- Bernie Fine (Syracuse)
- Wayne Morgan (St. Lawrence)
- Barry Copeland (Central Michigan)

Legend

- (C) Team captain
- (S) Suspended
- (I) Ineligible
- (W) Walk-on
- Injured
- Current redshirt

Roster
Last update: 2019-Mar-16

== Schedule and results ==
Date time, TV	Rank^{#}	Opponent^{#}	Result	Record	Site city, state
Non-conference Regular season
Nov 29, 1986*	No. 15	Loyola–Chicago	W 87–66	1–0	Carrier Dome; Syracuse, New York
Dec 1, 1986*	No. 17	George Washington	W 82–69	2–0	Carrier Dome; Syracuse, New York
Dec 5, 1986*	No. 17	Oklahoma State; Carrier Classic	W 73–62	3–0	Carrier Dome; Syracuse, New York
Dec 6, 1986*	No. 17	No. 19 Northeastern; Carrier Classic	W 94–74	4–0	Carrier Dome; Syracuse, New York
Dec 8, 1986*	No. 12	Cornell	W 83–76	5–0	Carrier Dome; Syracuse, New York
Dec 11, 1986*	No. 12	vs. St. Bonaventure	W 66–52	6–0	Buffalo Memorial Auditorium; Buffalo, New York
Dec 13, 1986*	No. 12	Canisius	W 99–67	7–0	Carrier Dome; Syracuse, New York
Dec 20, 1986*	No. 9	Fairfield	W 93–74	8–0	Carrier Dome; Syracuse, New York
Dec 26, 1986*	No. 7	vs. Wichita State; Hawaii Loa Holiday Classic	W 83–69	9–0	Kaneohe Armory; Kaneohe, Hawaii
Dec 27, 1986	No. 7	at vs. Hawaii Loa; Hawaii Loa Holiday Classic	W 107–89	10–0	Kaneohe Armory; Kaneohe, Hawaii
Dec 30, 1986*	No. 7	Boston University	W 96–67	11–0	Carrier Dome; Syracuse, New York
Jan 3, 1987	No. 7	at Connecticut	W 88–71	12–0 (1–0)	Hartford Civic Center; Hartford, Connecticut
Jan 5, 1987	No. 7	at Providence	W 89–85	13–0 (2–0)	Providence Civic Center; Providence, Rhode Island
Jan 10, 1987	No. 5	Seton Hall	W 92–84	14–0 (3–0)	Carrier Dome; Syracuse, New York
Jan 13, 1987	No. 5	at Boston College	W 76–64	15–0 (4–0)	Roberts Center; Boston, Massachusetts
Jan 18, 1987*	No. 5	at Michigan	L 88–91	15–1	Crisler Arena; Ann Arbor, Michigan
Jan 21, 1987	No. 5	Villanova	W 70–58	16–1 (5–0)	Carrier Dome; Syracuse, New York
Jan 24, 1987	No. 7	No. 14 St. John's	W 64–63	17–1 (6–0)	Carrier Dome; Syracuse, New York
Jan 26, 1987	No. 7	No. 17 Pittsburgh	L 70–84	17–2 (6–1)	Carrier Dome; Syracuse, New York
Jan 31, 1987	No. 6	at No. 11 Georgetown; Rivalry	L 81–83 ^{OT}	17–3 (6–2)	Capital Centre; Landover, Maryland
Feb 3, 1987	No. 11	at Seton Hall	W 84–80	18–3 (7–2)	Brendan Byrne Arena; East Rutherford, New Jersey
Feb 7, 1987	No. 11	Connecticut	W 59–53	19–3 (8–2)	Carrier Dome; Syracuse, New York
Feb 9, 1987	No. 9	at No. 10 Pittsburgh	L 61–63	19–4 (8–3)	Fitzgerald Field House; Pittsburgh, Pennsylvania
Feb 14, 1987*	No. 9	Louisville	W 99–72	20–4	Carrier Dome; Syracuse, New York
Feb 16, 1987	No. 9	vs. Villanova	W 96–82	21–4 (9–3)	The Spectrum; Philadelphia, Pennsylvania
Feb 19, 1987	No. 9	No. 19 Providence	W 90–81	22–4 (10–3)	Carrier Dome; Syracuse, New York
Feb 22, 1987	No. 9	No. 11 Georgetown; Rivalry	L 71–72	22–5 (10–4)	Carrier Dome; Syracuse, New York
Feb 25, 1987	No. 11	at St. John's	W 88–80	23–5 (11–4)	Madison Square Garden; New York, New York
Feb 28, 1987	No. 11	Boston College	W 87–63	24–5 (12–4)	Carrier Dome; Syracuse, New York
Big East Tournament
Mar 6, 1987	No. 10	vs. Villanova; Quarterfinals	W 72–66	25–5	Madison Square Garden; New York, New York
Mar 7, 1987	No. 10	vs. No. 11 Pittsburgh; Semifinals	W 99–85	26–5	Madison Square Garden; New York, New York
Mar 8, 1987	No. 10	vs. No. 7 Georgetown; Championship game/Rivalry	L 59–69	26–6	Madison Square Garden; New York, New York
NCAA Tournament
Mar 13, 1987*	(2 E) No. 10	vs. (15 E) Georgia Southern; First round	W 79–73	27–6	Carrier Dome; Syracuse, New York
Mar 15, 1987*	(2 E) No. 10	vs. (10 E) Western Kentucky; Second Round	W 104–86	28–6	Carrier Dome; Syracuse, New York
Mar 19, 1987*	(2 E) No. 10	vs. (6 E) Florida; East Regional semifinal – Sweet Sixteen	W 87–81	29–6	Brendan Byrne Arena; East Rutherford, New Jersey
Mar 21, 1987*	(2 E) No. 10	vs. (1 E) No. 2 North Carolina; East Regional Final – Elite Eight	W 79–75	30–6	Brendan Byrne Arena; East Rutherford, New Jersey
Mar 28, 1987*	(2 E) No. 10	vs. (6 SE) Providence; National semifinal – Final Four	W 77–63	31–6	Louisiana Superdome (64,959); New Orleans, Louisiana
Mar 30, 1987*	(2 E) No. 10	vs. (1 MW) No. 3 Indiana; National Championship Game	L 73–74	31–7	Louisiana Superdome; New Orleans, Louisiana
*Non-conference game. ^{#}Rankings from AP Poll. (#) Tournament seedings in parentheses. E=East.

== Rankings ==
Ranking movements Legend: ██ Increase in ranking ██ Decrease in ranking
	Week															
Poll	Pre	1	2	3	4	5	6	7	8	9	10	11	12	13	14	Final
AP	15	17	12	9	7	7	5	5	7	6	11	9	9	11	10	10
Coaches	Not released	13	12	10	7	7	6	6	7	6	11	9	9	11	11	10
