= 1987 NCAA Division I men's basketball tournament =

Edition of USA college basketball tournament

- Season: 1986–87
- Teams: 64
- Finals site: Louisiana Superdome, New Orleans, Louisiana
- Champions: Indiana Hoosiers (5th title, 5th title game, 6th Final Four)
- Runner-up: Syracuse Orangemen (1st title game, 2nd Final Four)
- Semifinalists: Providence Friars (2nd Final Four); UNLV Runnin' Rebels (2nd Final Four)
- Winning coach: Bob Knight (3rd title)
- MOP: Keith Smart (Indiana)
- Attendance: 654,744
- Top scorers: Steve Alford (Indiana); Rony Seikaly (Syracuse) (138 points)

The 1987 NCAA Division I men's basketball tournament involved 64 schools playing in single-elimination play to determine the national champion of men's NCAA Division I college basketball. The 49th annual edition of the tournament began on March 12, 1987, and ended with the championship game on March 30, at the Louisiana Superdome in New Orleans, Louisiana. A total of 63 games were played.

Indiana, coached by Bob Knight, won the national title with a 74–73 victory in the final game over Syracuse, coached by Jim Boeheim. Keith Smart of Indiana, who hit the game-winner in the final seconds, and intercepted the full court pass at the last second, was named the tournament's Most Outstanding Player.

The tournament also featured a "Cinderella team" in the Final Four, as Providence College, led by a then-unknown Rick Pitino, made their first Final Four appearance since 1973.

One year after reaching the Final Four as a #11 seed, LSU made another deep run as a #10 seed in the Midwest region. The Tigers ousted #2 seed Temple in the second round and #3 seed DePaul in the Sweet 16 before losing 77–76 to top seeded Indiana in the Elite Eight.

This was the last tournament in which teams were allowed to have home court advantage: national runner-up Syracuse (2E), DePaul (3MW), Arizona (10W) and UAB (11SE) all opened the tournament playing on their home courts. UAB and Arizona each lost in the first round, while DePaul won twice at the Rosemont Horizon. Under rules adopted in 1988, teams cannot play in a facility in which they play four or more regular season games.

The 1987 NCAA men's basketball tournament was also the first tournament to use the three-point shot.

== Schedule and venues ==
1987 first and second rounds
1987 Regionals (blue) and Final Four (red)

The following are the sites that were selected to host each round of the 1987 tournament:

First and Second Rounds

- March 12 and 14
  - East Region
    - Charlotte Coliseum, Charlotte, North Carolina (Host: University of North Carolina at Charlotte)
  - Midwest Region
    - Hoosier Dome, Indianapolis, Indiana (Hosts: Butler University, Midwestern Collegiate Conference)
  - Southeast Region
    - Birmingham-Jefferson Civic Center Coliseum, Birmingham, Alabama (Host: Southeastern Conference)
  - West Region
    - Jon M. Huntsman Center, Salt Lake City, Utah (Host: University of Utah)
- March 13 and 15
  - East Region
    - Carrier Dome, Syracuse, New York (Host: Syracuse University)
  - Midwest Region
    - Rosemont Horizon, Rosemont, Illinois (Host: DePaul University)
  - Southeast Region
    - Omni Coliseum, Atlanta, Georgia (Host: Georgia Tech)
  - West Region
    - McKale Center, Tucson, Arizona (Host: University of Arizona)

Regional semifinals and finals (Sweet Sixteen and Elite Eight)

- March 19 and 21
  - East Regional, Brendan Byrne Arena, East Rutherford, New Jersey (Hosts: Seton Hall University, Big East Conference)
  - Southeast Regional, Freedom Hall, Louisville, Kentucky (Host: University of Louisville)
- March 20 and 22
  - Midwest Regional, Riverfront Coliseum, Cincinnati, Ohio (Hosts: University of Cincinnati, Xavier University)
  - West Regional, Kingdome, Seattle, Washington (Host: University of Washington)

National semifinals and championship (Final Four and championship)

- March 28 and 30
  - Louisiana Superdome, New Orleans, Louisiana (Host: Tulane University)

== Teams ==
Region	Seed	Team	Coach	Conference	Finished	Final Opponent	Score
East
East	1	North Carolina	Dean Smith	Atlantic Coast	Regional Runner-up	2 Syracuse	L 79–75
East	2	Syracuse	Jim Boeheim	Big East	Runner-up	1 Indiana	L 74–73
East	3	Purdue	Gene Keady	Big Ten	Round of 32	6 Florida	L 85–66
East	4	TCU	Jim Killingsworth	Southwest	Round of 32	5 Notre Dame	L 58–57
East	5	Notre Dame	Digger Phelps	Independent	Sweet Sixteen	1 North Carolina	L 74–68
East	6	Florida	Norm Sloan	Southeastern	Sweet Sixteen	2 Syracuse	L 87–81
East	7	West Virginia	Gale Catlett	Atlantic 10	Round of 64	10 Western Kentucky	L 64–62
East	8	Navy	Pete Herrmann	Colonial	Round of 64	9 Michigan	L 97–82
East	9	Michigan	Bill Frieder	Big Ten	Round of 32	1 North Carolina	L 109–97
East	10	Western Kentucky	Murray Arnold	Sun Belt	Round of 32	2 Syracuse	L 104–86
East	11	NC State	Jim Valvano	Atlantic Coast	Round of 64	6 Florida	L 82–70
East	12	Middle Tennessee State	Bruce Stewart	Ohio Valley	Round of 64	5 Notre Dame	L 84–71
East	13	Marshall	Rick Huckabay	Southern	Round of 64	4 TCU	L 76–60
East	14	Northeastern	Karl Fogel	ECAC North	Round of 64	3 Purdue	L 104–95
East	15	Georgia Southern	Frank Kerns	Trans America	Round of 64	2 Syracuse	L 79–73
East	16	Penn	Tom Schneider	Ivy League	Round of 64	1 North Carolina	L 113–82
Midwest
Midwest	1	Indiana	Bob Knight	Big Ten	Champion	2 Syracuse	W 74–73
Midwest	2	Temple	John Chaney	Atlantic 10	Round of 32	10 LSU	L 72–62
Midwest	3	DePaul	Joey Meyer	Independent	Sweet Sixteen	10 LSU	L 63–58
Midwest	4	Missouri	Norm Stewart	Big Eight	Round of 64	13 Xavier	L 70–69
Midwest	5	Duke	Mike Krzyzewski	Atlantic Coast	Sweet Sixteen	1 Indiana	L 88–82
Midwest	6	St. John's	Lou Carnesecca	Big East	Round of 32	3 DePaul	L 83–75
Midwest	7	Georgia Tech	Bobby Cremins	Atlantic Coast	Round of 64	10 LSU	L 85–79
Midwest	8	Auburn	Sonny Smith	Southeastern	Round of 32	1 Indiana	L 107–90
Midwest	9	San Diego	Hank Egan	West Coast	Round of 64	8 Auburn	L 62–61
Midwest	10	LSU	Dale Brown	Southeastern	Regional Runner-up	1 Indiana	L 77–76
Midwest	11	Wichita State	Eddie Fogler	Missouri Valley	Round of 64	6 St. John's	L 57–55
Midwest	12	Texas A&M	Shelby Metcalf	Southwest	Round of 64	5 Duke	L 58–51
Midwest	13	Xavier	Pete Gillen	Midwestern	Round of 32	5 Duke	L 65–60
Midwest	14	Louisiana Tech	Tommy Joe Eagles	Southland	Round of 64	3 DePaul	L 76–62
Midwest	15	Southern	Ben Jobe	Southwest Athletic	Round of 64	2 Temple	L 75–56
Midwest	16	Fairfield	Mitch Buonaguro	Metro Atlantic	Round of 64	1 Indiana	L 92–58
Southeast
Southeast	1	Georgetown	John Thompson	Big East	Regional Runner-up	6 Providence	L 88–73
Southeast	2	Alabama	Wimp Sanderson	Southeastern	Sweet Sixteen	6 Providence	L 103–82
Southeast	3	Illinois	Lou Henson	Big Ten	Round of 64	14 Austin Peay	L 68–67
Southeast	4	Clemson	Cliff Ellis	Atlantic Coast	Round of 64	13 Southwest Missouri State	L 65–60
Southeast	5	Kansas	Larry Brown	Big Eight	Sweet Sixteen	1 Georgetown	L 70–57
Southeast	6	Providence	Rick Pitino	Big East	National semifinals	2 Syracuse	L 77–63
Southeast	7	New Orleans	Benny Dees	Independent	Round of 32	2 Alabama	L 101–76
Southeast	8	Kentucky	Eddie Sutton	Southeastern	Round of 64	9 Ohio State	L 91–77
Southeast	9	Ohio State	Gary Williams	Big Ten	Round of 32	1 Georgetown	L 82–79
Southeast	10	BYU	LaDell Andersen	Western Athletic	Round of 64	7 New Orleans	L 83–79
Southeast	11	UAB	Gene Bartow	Sun Belt	Round of 64	6 Providence	L 90–68
Southeast	12	Houston	Pat Foster	Southwest	Round of 64	5 Kansas	L 66–55
Southeast	13	Southwest Missouri State	Charlie Spoonhour	Mid-Continent	Round of 32	5 Kansas	L 67–63
Southeast	14	Austin Peay	Lake Kelly	Ohio Valley	Round of 32	6 Providence	L 90–87
Southeast	15	North Carolina A&T	Don Corbett	Mid-Eastern	Round of 64	2 Alabama	L 88–71
Southeast	16	Bucknell	Charles Woollum	East Coast	Round of 64	1 Georgetown	L 75–53
West
West	1	UNLV	Jerry Tarkanian	Pacific Coast	National semifinals	1 Indiana	L 97–93
West	2	Iowa	Tom Davis	Big Ten	Regional Runner-up	1 UNLV	L 84–81
West	3	Pittsburgh	Paul Evans	Big East	Round of 32	6 Oklahoma	L 96–93
West	4	UCLA	Walt Hazzard	Pacific-10	Round of 32	12 Wyoming	L 78–68
West	5	Virginia	Terry Holland	Atlantic Coast	Round of 64	12 Wyoming	L 64–60
West	6	Oklahoma	Billy Tubbs	Big Eight	Sweet Sixteen	2 Iowa	L 93–91
West	7	UTEP	Don Haskins	Western Athletic	Round of 32	2 Iowa	L 84–82
West	8	Georgia	Hugh Durham	Southeastern	Round of 64	9 Kansas State	L 82–79
West	9	Kansas State	Lon Kruger	Big Eight	Round of 32	1 UNLV	L 80–61
West	10	Arizona	Lute Olson	Pacific-10	Round of 64	7 UTEP	L 98–91
West	11	Tulsa	J. D. Barnett	Missouri Valley	Round of 64	6 Oklahoma	L 74–69
West	12	Wyoming	Jim Brandenburg	Western Athletic	Sweet Sixteen	1 UNLV	L 92–78
West	13	Central Michigan	Charlie Coles	Mid-American	Round of 64	4 UCLA	L 92–73
West	14	Marist	Dave Magarity	ECAC Metro	Round of 64	3 Pittsburgh	L 93–68
West	15	Santa Clara	Carroll Williams	West Coast	Round of 64	2 Iowa	L 99–76
West	16	Idaho State	Jim Boutin	Big Sky	Round of 64	1 UNLV	L 95–70

== Bracket ==
=== East Regional – East Rutherford, New Jersey ===
First round
1	North Carolina	113
16	Penn	82
Charlotte
8	Navy	82
9	Michigan	97
5	Notre Dame	84
12	Middle Tennessee State	71
Charlotte
4	TCU	76
13	Marshall	60
6	Florida	82
11	NC State	70
Syracuse
3	Purdue	104
14	Northeastern	95
7	West Virginia	62
10	Western Kentucky	64
Syracuse
2	Syracuse	79
15	Georgia Southern	73

Quarter-finals
1	North Carolina	109
9	Michigan	97
5	Notre Dame	58
4	TCU	57
6	Florida	85
3	Purdue	66
10	Western Kentucky	86
2	Syracuse	104

Regional semifinals
1	North Carolina	74
5	Notre Dame	68
6	Florida	81
2	Syracuse	87

Regional Finals
1	North Carolina	75
2	Syracuse	79

==== Regional Final Summary ====
CBS

Saturday, March 21

box score

#2 Syracuse Orangemen 79, #1 North Carolina Tar Heels 75
Pts: R. Seikaly – 26; Rebs: D. Coleman – 14; Asts: S. Douglas – 9	Pts: K. Smith – 25; Rebs: J. Wolf – 10; Asts: K. Smith – 7 Halftime Score: Syracuse, 41-30

Brendan Byrne Arena – East Rutherford, New Jersey
Referees: Tyler Honsen

=== Southeast Regional – Louisville, Kentucky ===
First round
1	Georgetown	75
16	Bucknell	53
Atlanta
8	Kentucky	77
9	Ohio State	91
5	Kansas	66
12	Houston	55
Atlanta
4	Clemson	60
13	Southwest Missouri State	65
6	Providence	90
11	UAB	68
Birmingham
3	Illinois	67
14	Austin Peay	68
7	New Orleans	83
10	BYU	79
Birmingham
2	Alabama	88
15	North Carolina A&T	71

Quarter-finals
1	Georgetown	82
9	Ohio State	79
5	Kansas	67
13	Southwest Missouri State	63
6	Providence	90^{OT}
14	Austin Peay	87
7	New Orleans	76
2	Alabama	101

Regional semifinals
1	Georgetown	70
5	Kansas	57
6	Providence	103
2	Alabama	82

Regional Finals
1	Georgetown	73
6	Providence	88

==== Regional Final Summary ====
CBS

Saturday, March 21

box score

#6 Providence Friars 88, #1 Georgetown Hoyas 73
Pts: B. Donovan – 20; Rebs: D. Kipfer – 5 Asts: B. Donovan – 6	Pts: R. Williams – 25; Rebs: P. McDonald – 10; Asts: B. Winston – 4 Halftime Score: Providence, 54-37

Freedom Hall – Louisville, Kentucky

=== Midwest Regional – Cincinnati, Ohio ===
First round
1	Indiana	92
16	Fairfield	58
Indianapolis
8	Auburn	62
9	San Diego	61
5	Duke	58
12	Texas A&M	51
Indianapolis
4	Missouri	69
13	Xavier	70
6	St. John's	57
11	Wichita State	55
Rosemont
3	DePaul	76
14	Louisiana Tech	62
7	Georgia Tech	79
10	LSU	85
Rosemont
2	Temple	75
15	Southern	56

Quarter-finals
1	Indiana	107
8	Auburn	90
5	Duke	65
13	Xavier	60
6	St. John's	75
3	DePaul	83^{OT}
10	LSU	72
2	Temple	62

Regional semifinals
1	Indiana	88
5	Duke	82
3	DePaul	58
10	LSU	63

Regional Finals
1	Indiana	77
10	LSU	76

CBS

Sunday, March 22

box score

#1 Indiana Hoosiers 77, #10 LSU Tigers 76
Pts: S. Alford – 20; Rebs: D. Garrett – 15; Asts: S. Alford – 7	Pts: N. Wilson – 20; Rebs: O. Brown, B. Woodside – 7 Asts: O. Brown – 8 Halftime Score: Indiana, 47-46

Riverfront Coliseum – Cincinnati, Ohio
Referees: Jim Burr, Tom Frahm, Paul Housman

=== West Regional – Seattle, Washington ===
First round
1	UNLV	95
16	Idaho State	70
Salt Lake City
8	Georgia	79
9	Kansas State	82^{OT}
5	Virginia	60
12	Wyoming	64
Salt Lake City
4	UCLA	92
13	Central Michigan	73
6	Oklahoma	74
11	Tulsa	69
Tucson
3	Pittsburgh	93
14	Marist	68
7	UTEP	98^{OT}
10	Arizona	91
Tucson
2	Iowa	99
15	Santa Clara	76

Quarter-finals
1	UNLV	80
9	Kansas State	61
12	Wyoming	78
4	UCLA	68
6	Oklahoma	96
3	Pittsburgh	93
7	UTEP	82
2	Iowa	84

Regional semifinals
1	UNLV	92
12	Wyoming	78
6	Oklahoma	91
2	Iowa	93^{OT}

Regional Finals
1	UNLV	84
2	Iowa	81

CBS

Sunday, March 22

box score

#1 UNLV Runnin' Rebels 84, #2 Iowa Hawkeyes 81
Pts: A. Gilliam – 27; Rebs: A. Gilliam – 10; Asts: M. Wade – 12	Pts: K. Gamble, B. J. Armstrong – 18; Rebs: B. Lohaus – 7 Asts: R. Marble – 5 Halftime Score: Iowa, 58-42

Kingdome – Seattle

=== Final Four – New Orleans, Louisiana ===
National semifinals
E2	Syracuse	77
SE6	Providence	63
MW1	Indiana	97
W1	UNLV	93

National Championship Game
E2	Syracuse	73
MW1	Indiana	74

=== Game summaries ===
CBS

Saturday, March 28

box score

#MW1 Indiana Hoosiers 97, #W1 UNLV Runnin' Rebels 93
Pts: S. Alford – 33; Rebs: D. Garrett – 10; Asts: R. Calloway – 6	Pts: F. Banks – 38; Rebs: A. Gilliam – 10; Asts: M. Wade – 18; Halftime Score: Indiana, 53-47

Louisiana Superdome – New Orleans
Referees: John Clougherty, Dick Paparo, Rusty Herring

CBS

Saturday, March, 28

box score

#E2 Syracuse Orangemen 77, #SE6 Providence Friars 63
Pts: G. Monroe – 20; Rebs: D. Coleman – 12; Asts: S. Douglas – 6	Pts: C. Screen – 18; Rebs: J. Duda – 7 Asts: B. Donovan – 7 Halftime Score: Syracuse, 36-26

Louisiana Superdome – New Orleans
Referees: Paul Galvan, Luis Grillo, Don Rutledge

=== National Championship ===
CBS

Monday, March, 30

Box score

#MW1 Indiana Hoosiers 74, #E2 Syracuse Orangemen 73
Pts: S. Alford – 23; Rebs: D. Garrett – 10; Asts: J. Hillman, K. Smart – 6	Pts: S. Douglas – 20; Rebs: D. Coleman – 19; Asts: S. Douglas – 7 Halftime Score: Indiana, 34-33

Louisiana Superdome – New Orleans
Referees: Joe Forte, Nolan Fine, Jody Sylvester

== Trivia ==
- The 59th Academy Awards show was broadcast on the ABC network at the same time as CBS network broadcast of the championship game between Indiana and Syracuse. Oscars show host Chevy Chase quipped later in the evening, "Is the game over yet?" The Oscars show would subsequently be scheduled around the tournament broadcast by moving it later in April for two years.
- Tenth seeded LSU reached the Elite Eight for the second straight year without being favored to win a game. This time, the Tigers did not have the advantage of playing their first- and second-round games on their home court. They had previously reached the Final Four as an 11-seed in 1986, losing to eventual national champion Louisville Cardinals. The Tigers missed a shot at the buzzer and fell short of another trip to the Final Four, losing 77–76 to eventual national champion Indiana. It marked the fifth time in seven tournament appearances between 1979 and 1987 LSU was eliminated by the eventual national champion. The Tigers did not reach the Elite Eight again until 2006.
- Years after the end of the tournament, Alabama, DePaul, Florida, Marshall, and North Carolina State all had their tournament spots vacated by the NCAA retroactively.
- This marked the first time that CBS Sports used "One Shining Moment" during their tournament epilogue. Initially, the song was supposed to have been played after Super Bowl XXI (which was also aired on CBS), but due to time constraints, its debut was delayed until the national championship game. The opening words for the football version were "The ball is kicked"; in the reworked version, the word "kicked" was changed to "tipped" to suit the tournament.
- The three losing coaches in the Final Four all eventually won national titles. Jerry Tarkanian was the first to do so, winning in 1990 with UNLV defeating Duke 103–73. Rick Pitino followed in 1996 with Kentucky, defeating Jim Boeheim's Syracuse in the final. Boeheim would win in 2003 with Syracuse by defeating Kansas.
- There were no teams from the Metro Conference, Big South Conference or Gulf Star Conference in the tournament. The Metro Conference allowed Memphis State, which was serving an NCAA tournament ban that year, to compete in its conference tournament, which it won by defeating the defending 1986 National Champion Louisville Cardinals by the lopsided score 75 to 52 on the Cardinals' home court, Freedom Hall in Louisville, Kentucky. The NCAA basketball tournament committee said as the conference had committed its automatic berth would go to its conference tournament winner, the conference lost its automatic berth that year, and no other schools received an at-large entry. Most conferences now prohibit teams on postseason bans from participating in conference tournaments as a result, or have provisional automatic bids awarded to the eligible team that advanced the most. The Gulf Star and Big South did not have automatic bids to the tournament because many of the schools in these conferences were transitioning from other divisions.
- During the selection show, there was a spot left open for the #12 seed in the Southeast Region. Kansas, the 5th seed in the region, was due to face either Washington or Houston in the first round. Washington was facing UCLA in the finals of the Pac-10 tournament at the time the selections were announced. UCLA held on to defeat Washington 76–62, putting Houston into the field of 64.
- Florida made the NCAA Tournament for the first time, making it to the Sweet Sixteen. Coincidentally, Providence was led to the Final Four by Billy Donovan, who would go on to coach the Gators to multiple Final Fours and 2 national titles.
- For the second time in 5 years, a rule involving how the clock would run after a made basket played a massive role at the end of a title game. In 1983, N.C. State won the title on a dunk with 1 second left, as the clock ran through the dunk and ran out before Houston could do anything. In 1987, Syracuse players (either unaware of the clock-running post basket or freezing under pressure) let 4 seconds run off the clock after Keith Smart's made jumper; only 1 second was left when a timeout was called, and the Orangemen's last shot was missed to give Indiana the national title. For the 1993–94 season, the rules were permanently changed, so with 1 minute or less in a half or overtime the clock stops when a basket is made and doesn't start again until the ball is inbounded by the other team (regardless of whether they use a timeout first or not).

== Announcers ==
CBS Studio Hosts:

- Jim Nantz and James Brown

ESPN studio hosts:

- John Saunders (daytime), Bob Ley (primetime) and Dick Vitale
- Brent Musburger and Billy Packer – first round (Virginia–Wyoming) at Salt Lake City, Utah; Second Round at Indianapolis, Indiana and Rosemont, Illinois; East Regional at East Rutherford, New Jersey; Midwest Regional Final at Cincinnati, Ohio; Final Four at New Orleans, Louisiana
- Dick Stockton and Tom Heinsohn – First (Oklahoma–Tulsa) and Second Rounds at Tucson, Arizona; Southeast Regional semifinal (Georgetown–Kansas) and Regional Final at Louisville, Kentucky
- Verne Lundquist and Billy Cunningham – second round at Charlotte, North Carolina and Atlanta, Georgia; Midwest Regional semifinal (Duke-Indiana) at Cincinnati, Ohio; West Regional Final at Seattle, Washington
- Tom Hammond and Larry Conley – Southeast Regional semifinal (Alabama–Providence) at Louisville, Kentucky
- Mike Patrick and Jack Givens - Midwest Regional semifinal (LSU-DePaul) at Cincinnati, Ohio
- Tim Brant and Bill Raftery – second round at Syracuse, New York; West Regional semifinals at Seattle, Washington
- Mike Patrick and Larry Conley – first (Alabama–North Carolina A&T, Providence–UAB) and second rounds at Birmingham, Alabama
- Gary Bender and Hubie Brown – second round at Salt Lake City, Utah
- Jim Thacker and Jack Givens – first round (North Carolina–Pennsylvania, TCU–Marshall) at Charlotte, North Carolina
- Frank Herzog and Bucky Waters – first round (Notre Dame–Middle Tennessee State, Navy–Michigan) at Charlotte, North Carolina
- Mike Gorman and Ron Perry – first round (Syracuse–Georgia Southern, Purdue–Northeastern) at Syracuse, New York
- Phil Stone and Bill Raftery – first round (Florida–N.C. State, West Virginia–Western Kentucky) at Syracuse, New York
- John Sanders and Joe Dean – first round (Georgetown–Bucknell) at Atlanta, Georgia
- John Sanders and Dave Gavitt – first round (Kentucky–Ohio State) at Atlanta, Georgia
- Fred White and Joe Dean – first round (Kansas–Houston) at Atlanta, Georgia
- Fred White and Dave Gavitt – first round (Clemson–SW Missouri State) at Atlanta, Georgia
- Bob Rathbun and Dan Bonner – first round (Illinois–Austin Peay, New Orleans–Brigham Young) at Birmingham, Alabama
- Tom Hammond and Jim Gibbons – first round (Indiana–Fairfield, Missouri–Xavier) at Indianapolis, Indiana
- Ralph Hacker and John Laskowski – first round (Duke–Texas A&M, Auburn–San Diego) at Indianapolis, Indiana
- Mick Hubert and Gary Thompson – first round (Temple–Southern, DePaul–Louisiana Tech) at Rosemont, Illinois
- Wayne Larrivee and Bob Ortegel – first round (St. John's–Wichita State, Georgia Tech–LSU) at Rosemont, Illinois
- Frank Fallon and Lynn Shackelford – first round (UNLV–Idaho State) at Salt Lake City, Utah
- Bob Carpenter and Irv Brown – first round (UCLA–Central Michigan, Georgia–Kansas State) at Salt Lake City, Utah
- Pete Solomon and Bruce Larson – first round (Iowa–Santa Clara) at Tucson, Arizona
- Ted Robinson and Dan Belluomini – first round (Pittsburgh–Marist, UTEP–Arizona) at Tucson, Arizona

== See also ==
- 1987 NCAA Division II men's basketball tournament
- 1987 NCAA Division III men's basketball tournament
- 1987 NCAA Division I women's basketball tournament
- 1987 NCAA Division II women's basketball tournament
- 1987 NCAA Division III women's basketball tournament
- 1987 National Invitation Tournament
- 1987 National Women's Invitation Tournament
- 1987 NAIA Division I men's basketball tournament
- 1987 NAIA Division I women's basketball tournament
