= Reggie Williams (basketball, born 1964) =

American basketball player (born 1964)

Personal information
- Born: March 5, 1964 (age 62) Baltimore, Maryland, U.S.
- Listed height: 6 ft 7 in (2.01 m)
- Listed weight: 190 lb (86 kg)

Career information
- High school: Paul Laurence Dunbar (Baltimore, Maryland)
- College: Georgetown (1983–1987)
- NBA draft: 1987: 1st round, 4th overall pick
- Drafted by: Los Angeles Clippers
- Playing career: 1987–1997
- Position: Shooting guard / small forward
- Number: 34, 2, 7

Career history
- 1987–1989: Los Angeles Clippers
- 1989–1990: Cleveland Cavaliers
- 1990: San Antonio Spurs
- 1991–1996: Denver Nuggets
- 1996: Indiana Pacers
- 1996–1997: New Jersey Nets

Career highlights
- NCAA champion (1984); Consensus first-team All-American (1987); Big East Player of the Year (1987); 2× First-team All-Big East (1986, 1987); Mr. Basketball USA (1983); USA Today High School Player of the Year (1983); McDonald's All-American (1983); First-team Parade All-American (1983)

Career NBA statistics
- Points: 7,508 (12.5 ppg)
- Rebounds: 2,393 (4.0 rpg)
- Assists: 1,402 (2.5 apg)
- Stats at NBA.com
- Stats at Basketball Reference

Reggie Williams (born March 5, 1964) is an American former professional basketball player who played ten seasons in the National Basketball Association (NBA). He was an All-American college player at Georgetown University and was a member of their 1983–84 National Championship team.

== Early life and college ==
Williams began his career as a McDonald's High School All-American while attending Paul Laurence Dunbar High School in Baltimore, where he played with fellow NBA players Muggsy Bogues, Reggie Lewis, and David Wingate. The 1981–82 Dunbar Poets finished the season at 29–0 during Williams's junior season and finished 31–0 during his senior season, and were ranked first in the nation by USA Today.

He then attended Georgetown and enjoyed an outstanding collegiate career. In his four seasons at Georgetown, he was amongst career leaders in scoring, rebounding, assists and steals in school history, finishing no lower than seventh in any category. As a freshman, he scored 19 points and grabbed seven rebounds against the University of Houston in the 1984 national championship game which the Hoyas won 84–75. Williams was named Most Valuable Player of the championship game. As a senior during the 1986–87 season, Williams was the leader of a young team which became a contender for a national championship. During that season he led the Big East in scoring, and led the team in rebounding, steals and blocked shots, and was third in assists. Because of Williams's play, it led Georgetown coach Thompson to dub the team "Reggie and the Miracles". The team won a share of the 1986–87 Big East Championship and the Big East Tournament. In the 1987 NCAA tournament, the Hoyas reached the Southeast Regional Final, but lost to Providence College, 88–73.

== Professional career ==
Williams was selected with the fourth pick overall of the 1987 NBA draft by the Los Angeles Clippers. On December 12, 1987, Williams scored 34 points and grabbed eight rebounds in a loss against the Seattle SuperSonics.

Williams would spend ten seasons (1987–1997) in the league, playing for the Clippers, Cleveland Cavaliers, San Antonio Spurs, Denver Nuggets (who he spent parts of 6 seasons with, the most of any franchise he played with), Indiana Pacers and New Jersey Nets.

During the 1991-92 NBA season with Denver, Williams played 81 games and averaged career-highs of 18.2 points and 1.8 steals per game. Twice in that season Williams recorded a career-best 7 steals in a single game. On December 1, 1992, Williams scored 35 points and grabbed 9 rebounds in a 112–105 win against the Houston Rockets.

In the 1994 NBA playoffs, Williams played a key role in Denver's unprecedented upset of the SuperSonics in the first round. It was the first time in league history that an 8 seed beat a 1 seed in the first round.

He retired with career totals of 7,508 points and 2,393 rebounds.

In July 2021, sportswriter Bill Simmons said “I still feel like if Reggie Williams goes to a different team, his entire career is different. The Clippers stamp went right on him,” when discussing the 1987 NBA draft.

== Life after the NBA ==
Williams became the boys' basketball coach at Towson Catholic High School on May 30, 2009. He had previously served in the same capacity at Jericho Christian Academy in Landover, Maryland until it closed several weeks later. In 2010, he became coach at Archbishop Carroll High School in Washington, D.C. He resigned in February 2013.

== Career statistics ==
Legend
GP	Games played	GS	Games started	MPG	Minutes per game
FG%	Field goal percentage	3P%	3-point field goal percentage	FT%	Free throw percentage
RPG	Rebounds per game	APG	Assists per game	SPG	Steals per game
BPG	Blocks per game	PPG	Points per game	**Bold**	Career high
*	Led the league

=== NBA ===
==== Regular season ====
Year	Team	GP	GS	MPG	FG%	3P%	FT%	RPG	APG	SPG	BPG	PPG
1987–88	L.A. Clippers	35	14	24.5	.356	.224	.727	3.4	1.7	.8	.6	10.4
1988–89	L.A. Clippers	63	17	20.7	.438	.288	.754	2.8	1.6	1.3	.5	10.2
1989–90	L.A. Clippers	5	5	26.6	.368	.000	**.857**	3.0	2.0	**1.8**	.2	12.0
1989–90	Cleveland	32	12	16.9	.381	.222	.732	1.9	1.2	.7	.3	6.8
1989–90	San Antonio	10	0	6.8	.452	.000	.667	.8	.5	.1	.3	4.2
1990–91	San Antonio	22	0	16.1	.480	**.538**	.854	2.7	2.1	.9	.5	7.8
1990–91	Denver	51	46	30.2	.444	.328	.840	4.8	1.7	**1.8**	.6	16.1
1991–92	Denver	81	**80**	32.4	.471	.359	.803	5.0	2.9	**1.8**	.8	**18.2**
1992–93	Denver	79	**79**	**34.5**	.458	.270	.804	**5.4**	**3.7**	1.6	**1.0**	17.0
1993–94	Denver	**82***	68	32.4	.412	.278	.733	4.8	**3.7**	1.4	.8	13.0
1994–95	Denver	74	70	29.7	.459	.320	.759	4.4	3.1	1.5	.9	13.4
1995–96	Denver	52	5	15.7	.370	.225	.846	2.3	1.4	.7	.4	4.6
1996–97	Indiana	2	0	16.5	.222	.000	.500	3.5	1.0	.0	.0	5.0
1996–97	New Jersey	11	0	15.2	.403	.273	.800	2.2	.7	.7	.4	6.5
Career		599	396	26.7	.437	.298	.784	4.0	2.5	1.3	.7	12.5

==== Playoffs ====
Year	Team	GP	GS	MPG	FG%	3P%	FT%	RPG	APG	SPG	BPG	PPG
1990	San Antonio	9	0	5.4	.333	.000	**1.000**	1.2	.3	.2	.0	2.2
1994	Denver	**12**	**12**	**33.8**	**.416**	**.400**	.771	5.1	3.5	.8	**1.0**	**14.3**
1995	Denver	3	3	28.0	.222	.308	**1.000**	**5.3**	**4.0**	**1.0**	.3	8.7
Career		24	15	22.4	.373	.369	.814	3.7	2.4	.6	.5	9.0
