= Sherman Douglas =

American basketball player (born 1966)

Personal information
- Born: September 15, 1966 (age 60) Washington, D.C., U.S.
- Listed height: 6 ft 0 in (1.83 m)
- Listed weight: 180 lb (82 kg)

Career information
- High school: Spingarn (Washington, D.C.)
- College: Syracuse (1985–1989)
- NBA draft: 1989: 2nd round, 28th overall pick
- Drafted by: Miami Heat
- Playing career: 1989–2001
- Position: Point guard
- Number: 11, 4, 20

Career history
- 1989–1992: Miami Heat
- 1992–1995: Boston Celtics
- 1995–1997: Milwaukee Bucks
- 1997–1998: New Jersey Nets
- 1999: Los Angeles Clippers
- 1999–2001: New Jersey Nets

Career highlights
- NBA All-Rookie First Team (1990); Consensus second-team All-American (1989); Second-team All-American – UPI (1988); Third-team All-American – AP (1988); 3× First-team All-Big East (1987–1989); No. 20 retired by Syracuse Orange

Career NBA statistics
- Points: 8,425 (11.0 ppg)
- Rebounds: 1,672 (2.2 rpg)
- Assists: 4,536 (5.9 apg)
- Stats at NBA.com
- Stats at Basketball Reference

Sherman Douglas (born September 15, 1966) is an American former professional basketball player from Syracuse University who played for the Miami Heat, Boston Celtics, Milwaukee Bucks, New Jersey Nets and the Los Angeles Clippers from 1989 to 2001. His nickname, The General is a play on his first name and his position as a point guard (as a floor general). He was known for revolutionizing the running "floater" shot in the lane.

== Career ==
In his four-year career for Syracuse he helped lead them to the 1987 Final Four, the first of Coach Jim Boeheim's career. Sherman Douglas set the all-time NCAA assist record with the Syracuse Orangemen in 1989. Although he was a second-round draft choice in 1989, his strong campaign (14.3 ppg and 7.6 apg) earned him a spot on the NBA's All-Rookie First Team. He bettered that campaign in 1990–91, when he led the Heat in scoring (18.5) and assists (8.5) and was named the team's most valuable player.

After holding out before the 1991–92 season, Douglas played five games with Miami before being dealt to the Boston Celtics for Brian Shaw on January 10, 1992. Douglas would play the best basketball of his career for the Boston Celtics, managing to pilot the team to the playoffs in 1994–1995 season despite their 35–47 record in the final season of the Boston Garden. Douglas averaged 14.7 points and 6.9 assists per game that year.

He played for the Los Angeles Clippers in the 1998–99 season and then was traded back to the Nets the season after.

During his career, Douglas played against Michael Jordan 30 times and lost all 30 games.

== NBA career statistics ==
Legend
GP	Games played	GS	Games started	MPG	Minutes per game
FG%	Field goal percentage	3P%	3-point field goal percentage	FT%	Free throw percentage
RPG	Rebounds per game	APG	Assists per game	SPG	Steals per game
BPG	Blocks per game	PPG	Points per game	**Bold**	Career high

=== Regular season ===
Year	Team	GP	GS	MPG	FG%	3P%	FT%	RPG	APG	SPG	BPG	PPG
1989–90	Miami	**81**	66	30.5	.494	.161	.687	2.5	7.6	**1.8**	0.1	14.3
1990–91	Miami	73	73	35.1	.504	.129	.686	**2.9**	8.5	1.7	0.1	**18.5**
1991–92	Miami	5	2	19.6	**.516**	.000	.714	1.2	3.8	0.8	0.0	7.4
1991–92	Boston	37	0	17.7	.455	.111	.680	1.5	4.1	0.6	**0.2**	7.3
1992–93	Boston	79	36	24.5	.498	.207	.560	2.1	6.4	0.6	0.1	7.8
1993–94	Boston	78	78	**35.8**	.462	.232	.641	2.5	**8.8**	1.1	0.1	13.3
1994–95	Boston	65	43	31.5	.475	.244	.689	2.6	6.9	1.2	0.0	14.7
1995–96	Boston	10	4	23.4	.429	.143	.625	2.3	3.9	0.2	0.0	9.8
1995–96	Milwaukee	69	62	30.4	.514	**.379**	.754	2.3	5.8	0.9	0.1	11.5
1996–97	Milwaukee	79	**79**	29.3	.502	.333	.667	2.4	5.4	1.0	0.1	9.7
1997–98	New Jersey	80	11	21.2	.495	.304	.669	1.7	4.0	0.7	0.1	8.0
1998–99	Los Angeles	30	19	28.1	.438	.000	.632	1.9	4.1	0.9	0.1	8.2
1999–00	New Jersey	20	2	15.5	.500	.313	**.893**	1.5	1.7	0.9	0.0	6.0
2000–01	New Jersey	59	7	18.5	.403	.200	.748	1.3	2.4	0.6	0.1	5.7
Career		765	482	27.6	.484	.267	.678	2.2	5.9	1.0	0.1	11.0

=== Playoffs ===
Year	Team	GP	GS	MPG	FG%	3P%	FT%	RPG	APG	SPG	BPG	PPG
1991–92	Boston	**6**	0	10.8	.360	.000	.500	0.7	1.7	0.0	0.0	3.2
1992–93	Boston	4	**4**	41.5	.378	.000	.667	**6.5**	**9.5**	1.0	0.0	11.0
1994–95	Boston	4	**4**	**42.0**	.353	.333	**.727**	5.0	8.3	1.0	**0.3**	15.0
1997–98	New Jersey	3	2	41.7	**.523**	**.400**	.700	2.7	8.3	**2.0**	0.0	**18.3**
Career		17	10	30.8	.401	.273	.684	3.4	6.2	0.8	0.1	10.5

== See also ==
- List of National Basketball Association players with most assists in a game
- List of NCAA Division I men's basketball players with 20 or more assists in a game
- List of NCAA Division I men's basketball career assists leaders
