= 1980–81 Big East Conference men's basketball season =

American college basketball season

1980–81 Big East Conference Men's Basketball Season
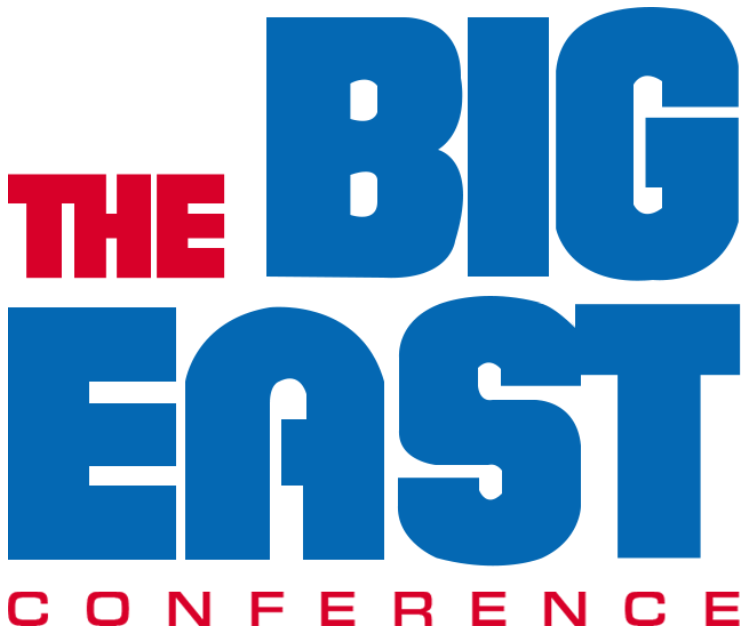
- League: NCAA Division I
- Sport: Basketball
- Duration: November 28, 1980 through March 7, 1981
- Teams: 8
- TV partner: ESPN

Regular Season
- Champion: Boston College (10–4)
- Season MVP: John Bagley – Boston College

Tournament
- Champions: Syracuse
- Finals MVP: Leo Rautins – Syracuse

Basketball seasons
- 1979–80 1981–82

1980–81 Big East men's basketball standings
	Conf.				Overall
Team	W		L	PCT	W		L	PCT
Boston College	10	–	4	.714	23	–	7	.767
Georgetown	9	–	5	.643	20	–	12	.625
St. John's	8	–	6	.571	17	–	11	.607
Villanova	8	–	6	.571	20	–	11	.645
Connecticut	8	–	6	.571	20	–	9	.690
Syracuse †	6	–	8	.429	22	–	12	.647
Seton Hall	4	–	10	.286	11	–	16	.407
Providence	3	–	11	.214	10	–	18	.357
† 1981 Big East tournament winner Rankings from AP poll

The 1980–81 Big East Conference men's basketball season was the second in conference history, and involved its eight full-time member schools.

Boston College won the regular season championship with a 10–4 record. Syracuse was the champion of the Big East tournament.

== Season summary & highlights ==
- The Big East expanded for the first time, becoming an eight-team conference with the addition of Villanova as a member.
- For the first time, Big East members played each other twice during the regular season, and the conference season expanded from six games the previous season to 14 games.
- Boston College won the regular-season championship, with a record of 10–4.
- After finishing 6–8 during the regular season, Syracuse advanced from a No. 6 seed in the Big East tournament to win the tournament championship with a triple-overtime victory over Villanova.
- The Big East tournament took place at the Carrier Dome in Syracuse, New York.
- Syracuse finished as the runner-up in the 1981 National Invitation Tournament.

== Head coaches ==
School	Coach	Season	Notes
Boston College	Tom Davis	4th	Big East Coach of the Year
Connecticut	Dom Perno	4th	
Georgetown	John Thompson, Jr.	9th	
Providence	Gary Walters	2nd	Resigned April 6, 1981
St. John's	Lou Carnesecca	13th	
Seton Hall	Bill Raftery	11th	Resigned November 3, 1981
Syracuse	Jim Boeheim	5th	
Villanova	Rollie Massimino	8th	

== Rankings ==
Four Big East teams made appearances in the Top 20 of the Associated Press poll during the season.

1980–81 Big East Conference Weekly Rankings Key: ██ Increase in ranking. ██ Decrease in ranking.
AP Poll	Pre	12/1	12/8	12/15	12/22	12/29	1/5	1/12	1/19	1/26	2/2	2/9	2/16	2/23	3/2	Final
Boston College																
Connecticut									20	20						
Georgetown	16	19														
Providence																
St. John's	17	16														
Seton Hall																
Syracuse	19	18	20													
Villanova																

== Regular-season statistical leaders ==
Scoring
Name	School	PPG
John Bagley	BC	20.4
Sleepy Floyd	GU	19.0
Dan Callandrillo	SHU	16.3
John Pinone	Vill	15.8
Corny Thompson	Conn	15.0

Rebounding
Name	School	RPG
Danny Schayes	Syr	8.4
Corny Thompson	Conn	8.1
David Russell	SJU	7.8
John Pinone	Vill	7.4
Wayne McKoy	SJU	7.1

Assists
Name	School	APG
Eddie Moss	Syr	5.4
Stewart Granger	Vill	5.3
Karl Hobbs	Conn	4.7
Jim Panaggio	Prov	3.9
Ricky Tucker	Prov	3.7

Steals
Name	School	SPG
Eddie Moss	Syr	2.5
Sleepy Floyd	GU	1.9
Erich Santifer	Syr	1.9
Fred Brown	GU	1.9
Stewart Granger	Vill	1.8

Blocks
Name	School	BPG
Danny Schayes	Syr	2.2
Rich Hunger	Prov	1.6
Howard McNeil	SHU	1.6
Burnett Adams	BC	1.6
Wayne McKoy	SJU	1.2

Field Goals
Name	School	FG%
Chuck Aleksinas	Conn	.631
John Pinone	Vill	.554
Marty Headd	Syr	.549
Erich Santifer	Syr	.530
David Russell	SJU	.518

Free Throws
Name	School	FT%
Martin Clark	BC	.832
Danny Schayes	Syr	.822
Sleepy Floyd	GU	.806
Larry Washington	SJU	.795
Corny Thompson	Conn	.792

== Postseason ==
=== Big East tournament ===
==== Seeding ====
For the first time, all conference members participated in the quarterfinals of the Big East tournament, with no team receiving a bye into the semifinals. Seeding was based on conference record, with tiebreakers applied as necessary. The tournament's seeding was as follows: (1) Boston College, (2) Georgetown, (3) St. John's, (4) Villanova, (5) Connecticut, (6) Syracuse, (7) Seton Hall, (8) Providence.

==== Bracket ====
Quarterfinals
1	Boston College	65
8	Providence	67
4	Villanova	65
5	Connecticut	54
2	Georgetown	58
7	Seton Hall	52
3	St. John's	66
6	Syracuse	71

Semifinals
8	Providence	49
4	Villanova	58^{OT}
2	Georgetown	53
6	Syracuse	67

Championship Game
4	Villanova	80
6	Syracuse	83^{3OT}

=== NCAA tournament ===
Three Big East teams received bids to the NCAA Tournament. Georgetown lost in the first round in the East Region, Villanova lost in the East Region quarterfinals, and Boston College lost in the Mideast Region semifinals.

School	Region	Seed	Round 1	Round 2	Sweet 16
Boston College	Mideast	5	12 Ball State, W 93–90	4 Wake Forest, W 67–64	9 Saint Joseph's, L 42–41
Villanova	East	9	8 Houston, W 90–72	1 Virginia, L 54–50	
Georgetown	East	7	10 James Madison, L 61–55		

=== National Invitation Tournament ===
Three Big East teams received bids to the National Invitation Tournament, which did not yet have seeding. They played in three different unnamed brackets. St. John's lost in the first round and Connecticut in the second round, but Syracuse advanced to the final and finished as the tournament runner-up.

School	Round 1	Round 2	Quarterfinals	Semifinals	Final
Syracuse	Marquette, W 88–81	Holy Cross, W 77–57	Michigan, W 91–76	Purdue, W 70–63	Tulsa, L 86–84
Connecticut	South Florida, W 65–55	Minnesota, L 84–66			
St. John's	Alabama, L 73–69				

== Awards and honors ==
=== Big East Conference ===
Player of the Year:

- John Bagley, Boston College, G, So.

Freshman of the Year:

- Fred Brown, Georgetown, G

Coach of the Year:

- Tom Davis, Boston College (4th season)

All-Big East First Team:

- John Bagley, Boston College, G, So., 6 ft 0 in (183 cm), 225 lb (102 kg), Bridgeport, Conn.
- Corny Thompson, Connecticut, F, Jr., 6 ft 8 in (203 cm), 225 lb (102 kg), Middletown, Conn.
- Sleepy Floyd, Georgetown, G, So., 6 ft 3 in (191 cm), 172 lb (78 kg), Gastonia, N.C.
- Danny Schayes, Syracuse, F, Sr., 6 ft 11 in (211 cm), 235 lb (107 kg), Syracuse, N.Y.
- John Pinone, Villanova, F, So., 6 ft 8 in (203 cm), 230 lb (104 kg), Hartford, Conn.

All-Big East First Team

- Chuck Aleksinas, Connecticut, C, Jr., 6 ft 8 in (203 cm), 225 lb (102 kg), Litchfield, Conn.
- Eric Smith, Georgetown, F, Jr., 6 ft 5 in (196 cm), 185 lb (84 kg), Potomac, Md.
- Dan Callandrillo, Seton Hall, G, Jr., 6 ft 2 in (188 cm), 185 lb (84 kg), North Bergen, N.J.
- David Russell, St. John's, F, So., 6 ft 7 in (201 cm), 215 lb (98 kg), New York, N.Y.
- Marty Headd, Syracuse, G, Sr., 6 ft 2 in (188 cm), 180 lb (82 kg), Syracuse, N.Y.

All-Big East Third Team:

- Dwan Chandler, Boston College, G, Jr., 6 ft 1 in (185 cm), 185 lb (84 kg), Boston, Mass.
- Mike McKay, Connecticut, G, Jr., 6 ft 5 in (196 cm), 190 lb (86 kg), Bridgeport, Conn.
- Howard McNeil, Seton Hall, C, Jr., 6 ft 9 in (206 cm), 225 lb (102 kg), Glassboro, N.J.
- Frank Gilroy, St. John's, F, Sr., 6 ft 5 in (196 cm), 205 lb (93 kg), Flushing, N.Y.
- Wayne McKoy, St. John's, C, Sr., 6 ft 9 in (206 cm), 235 lb (107 kg), Elizabethtown, N.C.
- Stewart Granger, Villanova, G, So., 6 ft 3 in (191 cm), 190 lb (86 kg), Montreal, Quebec, Canada

Big East All-Freshman Team:

- Jay Murphy, Boston College, F, Fr., 6 ft 9 in (206 cm), 220 lb (100 kg), Meriden, Conn.
- Martin Clark, Boston College, F, Fr., 6 ft 9 in (206 cm), Folkestone, United Kingdom
- Vernon Giscombe, Connecticut, G, Fr., 5 ft 11 in (180 cm), 165 lb (75 kg), The Bronx, N.Y.
- Fred Brown, Georgetown, G, Fr., 6 ft 5 in (196 cm), 190 lb (86 kg), The Bronx, N.Y.
- Otis Thorpe, Providence, F, Fr., 6 ft 9 in (206 cm), 225 lb (102 kg), Boynton Beach, Fla.
- Sir John Collins, Seton Hall, F, Fr., 6 ft 7 in (201 cm)

=== All-Americans ===
The following players were selected to the 1981 Associated Press All-America teams.

Second Team All-America:

- Sleepy Floyd, Georgetown, Key Stats: 19.0 ppg, 4.2 rpg, 2.6 apg, 46.7 FG%, 607 points

AP Honorable Mention

- John Bagley, Boston College
- John Pinone, Villanova
- David Russell, St. John's
- Danny Schayes, Syracuse
- Corny Thompson, Connecticut

== See also ==
- 1980–81 NCAA Division I men's basketball season
- 1980–81 Boston College Eagles men's basketball team
- 1980–81 Connecticut Huskies men's basketball team
- 1980–81 Georgetown Hoyas men's basketball team
- 1980–81 St. John's Redmen basketball team
- 1980–81 Syracuse Orangemen basketball team
- 1980–81 Villanova Wildcats men's basketball team
