= 1980–81 Villanova Wildcats men's basketball team =

American college basketball season

1980–81 Villanova Wildcats men's basketball

NCAA Men's Division I Tournament, Second round
- Conference: Big East Conference
- Record: 20–11 (8–6 Big East)
- Head coach: Rollie Massimino (9th season)
- Assistant coaches: Mitch Buonaguro (4th season); Marty Marbach (2nd season); Harry Booth
- Home arena: Villanova Field House

1980–81 Big East men's basketball standings
	Conf.				Overall
Team	W		L	PCT	W		L	PCT
Boston College	10	–	4	.714	23	–	7	.767
Georgetown	9	–	5	.643	20	–	12	.625
St. John's	8	–	6	.571	17	–	11	.607
Villanova	8	–	6	.571	20	–	11	.645
Connecticut	8	–	6	.571	20	–	9	.690
Syracuse †	6	–	8	.429	22	–	12	.647
Seton Hall	4	–	10	.286	11	–	16	.407
Providence	3	–	11	.214	10	–	18	.357
† 1981 Big East tournament winner Rankings from AP poll

The 1980–81 Villanova Wildcats men's basketball team represented Villanova University during the 1980–81 NCAA Division I men's basketball season. The head coach was Rollie Massimino. The team played its home games at Villanova Field House in Villanova, Pennsylvania, and was a member of the Big East Conference. The team finished tied for 3rd in the conference regular season standings and received a bid to the NCAA tournament before falling to No. 1 seed and eventual Final Four participant Virginia. Villanova finished with a 20–11 record (8–6 Big East).

== Roster ==
1980–81 Villanova Wildcats men's basketball team
Players
Coaches

Pos.	#	Name	Height	Weight	Year	Hometown
G	10	Stewart Granger	6 ft 3 in (1.91 m)	185 lb (84 kg)	So	Brooklyn, New York
F	45	John Pinone	6 ft 8 in (2.03 m)	225 lb (102 kg)	So	Hartford, Connecticut
G	14	Jeff Sherry	6 ft 3 in (1.91 m)	190 lb (86 kg)	Jr	Macungie, Pennsylvania

Head coach

- Rollie Massimino (Vermont)

Assistant coach(es)

- Mitch Buonaguro (Boston College)
- Marty Marbach (Saint Francis (PA))
- Harry Booth (Saint Joseph's)

Legend

- (C) Team captain
- (S) Suspended
- (I) Ineligible
- (W) Walk-on
- Injured
- Current redshirt

== Schedule and results ==
Date time, TV	Rank^{#}	Opponent^{#}	Result	Record	Site city, state
Regular season
*		Merrimack	W 90–61	1–0	Villanova Field House; Philadelphia, Pennsylvania
Dec 2, 1980*		St. Francis (NY)	W 95–73	2–0	Villanova Field House (2,200); Philadelphia, Pennsylvania
Dec 6, 1980		Providence	W 68–49	3–0 (1–0)	Villanova Field House; Philadelphia, Pennsylvania
Dec 9, 1980		at Seton Hall	W 66–65	4–0 (2–0)	Walsh Gymnasium; South Orange, New Jersey
Dec 13, 1980		Boston College	W 74–71	5–0 (3–0)	Villanova Field House; Philadelphia, Pennsylvania
Dec 6, 1980*		vs. La Salle	L 83–84	5–1	The Palestra; Philadelphia, Pennsylvania
Dec 28, 1980*		vs. San Francisco	W 93–66	6–1	Special Events Center; El Paso, Texas
Dec 29, 1980*		at UTEP	W 43–41	7–1	Special Events Center; El Paso, Texas
Jan 3, 1981		St. John's	L 78–90	7–2 (3–1)	Villanova Field House; Philadelphia, Pennsylvania
Jan 6, 1981*		Notre Dame	L 65–94	7–3	The Palestra; Philadelphia, Pennsylvania
Jan 10, 1981		at Syracuse	W 69–65	8–3 (4–1)	Carrier Dome; Syracuse, New York
Jan 14, 1981		at St. John's	L 54–56 ^{OT}	8–4 (4–2)	Alumni Hall; Queens, New York
Jan 17, 1981*		at Pennsylvania	W 68–55	9–4	The Palestra; Philadelphia, Pennsylvania
Jan 19, 1981*		Towson	W 84–64	10–4	Villanova Field House; Philadelphia, Pennsylvania
Jan 21, 1981		Connecticut	W 63–59	11–4 (5–2)	Villanova Field House; Philadelphia, Pennsylvania
Jan 24, 1981*		at Colgate	W 85–75	12–4	Cotterell Court; Hamilton, New York
Jan 26, 1981		at Boston College	L 60–73	12–5 (5–3)	Roberts Center; Chestnut Hill, Massachusetts
Jan 31, 1981*		vs. Temple	L 68–71	12–6	The Palestra; Philadelphia, Pennsylvania
Feb 4, 1981		at Georgetown	L 54–70	12–7 (5–4)	McDonough Gymnasium (4,504); Washington, D.C.
Feb 7, 1981*		at Maine	W 68–48	13–7	The Pit; Orono, Maine
Feb 11, 1981		Seton Hall	W 67–63	14–7 (6–4)	Villanova Field House; Philadelphia, Pennsylvania
Feb 14, 1981		at Providence	L 70–82	14–8 (6–5)	Providence Civic Center; Providence, Rhode Island
Feb 17, 1981		Syracuse	W 88–78	15–8 (7–5)	Villanova Field House; Philadelphia, Pennsylvania
Feb 21, 1981		vs. Georgetown	L 60–68	15–9 (7–6)	The Palestra (6,228); Philadelphia, Pennsylvania
Feb 23, 1981		at Connecticut	W 74–73	16–9 (8–6)	Hartford Civic Center; Storrs, Connecticut
Feb 28, 1981*		vs. Saint Joseph's	W 72–62	17–9	The Palestra; Philadelphia, Pennsylvania
Big East tournament
Mar 5, 1981*	(4)	vs. (5) Connecticut; Quarterfinals	W 65–54	18–9	Carrier Dome; Syracuse, New York
Mar 6, 1981*	(4)	vs. (8) Providence; Semifinals	W 58–49 ^{OT}	19–9	Carrier Dome; Syracuse, New York
Mar 7, 1981*	(4)	at (6) Syracuse; Championship game	L 80–83 ^{3OT}	19–10	Carrier Dome; Syracuse, New York
NCAA tournament
Mar 13, 1981*	(9 E)	vs. (8 E) Houston; First round	W 90–72	20–10	Charlotte Coliseum; Charlotte, North Carolina
Mar 15, 1981*	(9 E)	vs. (1 E) No. 5 Virginia; Second round	L 50–54	20–11	Charlotte Coliseum; Charlotte, North Carolina
*Non-conference game. ^{#}Rankings from AP poll. (#) Tournament seedings in parentheses. E=East.
