= 1980–81 St. John's Redmen basketball team =

American college basketball season

1980–81 St. John's Redmen men's basketball

Lapchick Memorial Champions

1981 NIT, First round
- Conference: Big East Conference (1979–2013)
- Record: 17–11 (8–6 Big East)
- Head coach: Lou Carnesecca
- Assistant coaches: Willis Reed; Al LoBalbo; Ron Rutledge
- Captains: Wayne McKoy; Frank Gilroy
- Home arena: Alumni Hall; Madison Square Garden

1980–81 Big East men's basketball standings
| | Conf. | | | | Overall |
| Team | W | | L | PCT | W | | L | PCT |
|---|---|---|---|---|---|---|---|---|
| Boston College | 10 | – | 4 | .714 | 23 | – | 7 | .767 |
| Georgetown | 9 | – | 5 | .643 | 20 | – | 12 | .625 |
| St. John's | 8 | – | 6 | .571 | 17 | – | 11 | .607 |
| Villanova | 8 | – | 6 | .571 | 20 | – | 11 | .645 |
| Connecticut | 8 | – | 6 | .571 | 20 | – | 9 | .690 |
| Syracuse † | 6 | – | 8 | .429 | 22 | – | 12 | .647 |
| Seton Hall | 4 | – | 10 | .286 | 11 | – | 16 | .407 |
| Providence | 3 | – | 11 | .214 | 10 | – | 18 | .357 |
† 1981 Big East tournament winner Rankings from AP poll

The 1980–81 St. John's Redmen basketball team represented St. John's University during the 1980–81 NCAA Division I men's basketball season. The team was coached by Lou Carnesecca in his thirteenth year at the school. St. John's home games are played at Alumni Hall and Madison Square Garden and the team is a member of the Big East Conference.

== Roster ==
1980–81 St. John's Red Storm men's basketball team
Players
Coaches

| Pos. | # | Name | Height | Weight | Year | Previous school | Hometown |
|---|---|---|---|---|---|---|---|
| F | - | Ray James (injured) | 6 ft 7 in (2.01 m) | — | Jr | Alexander Hamilton | Brooklyn, NY |
| F/C | - | Jeff Allen (redshirt) | 6 ft 10 in (2.08 m) | 235 lb (107 kg) | So | Norwalk/Rutgers | Norwalk, CT |
| G/F | - | Curtis Redding (S) | 6 ft 5 in (1.96 m) | — | RS Sr | Canarsie/Kansas State | Brooklyn, NY |
| G | 4 | George Garrison | 6 ft 1 in (1.85 m) | 170 lb (77 kg) | So | Bellport | Bellport, NY |
| G | 10 | Bob Kelly (redshirt) | 6 ft 2 in (1.88 m) | — | Jr | Delbarton/Holy Cross | South Orange, NJ |
| F | 11 | David Russell | 6 ft 6 in (1.98 m) | 205 lb (93 kg) | So | Bellport | Bellport, NY |
| G | 12 | Kevin Williams | 6 ft 3 in (1.91 m) | 170 lb (77 kg) | So | Charles E. Hughes | New York, NY |
| G | 14 | Mark Calzonetti | 6 ft 4 in (1.93 m) | 180 lb (82 kg) | Fr | Paul VI | Woodbury, NJ |
| G | 21 | Larry Washington | 6 ft 0 in (1.83 m) | 160 lb (73 kg) | RS Jr | Canarsie/Texas Tech | Brooklyn, NY |
| G/F | 22 | Ron Plair | 6 ft 4 in (1.93 m) | 190 lb (86 kg) | Sr | Bryant | East Elmhurst, NY |
| F/C | 32 | Trevor Jackson | 6 ft 8 in (2.03 m) | 200 lb (91 kg) | So | Springfield Gardens | Rosedale, NY |
| G/F | 35 | Billy Goodwin | 6 ft 5 in (1.96 m) | 200 lb (91 kg) | So | Columbus/San Jacinto | Bronx, NY |
| F | 42 | Mike Feigenbaum (redshirt) | 6 ft 6 in (1.98 m) | 205 lb (93 kg) | So | Lawrence/Ohio/Wagner | Cedarhurst, NY |
| F | 43 | Frank Gilroy (C) | 6 ft 6 in (1.98 m) | 215 lb (98 kg) | Sr | Holy Cross | Whitestone, NY |
| G/F | 44 | Tim Cluess | 6 ft 6 in (1.98 m) | — | Jr | St. Agnes | West Hempstead, NY |
| C | 55 | Wayne McKoy (C) | 6 ft 8 in (2.03 m) | 225 lb (102 kg) | Sr | Long Island Lutheran | Bayside, NY |

Head coach

- Lou Carnesecca (St. John's, '50)

Assistant coach(es)

- Carmine Calzonetti
- Al LoBalbo
- Ron Rutledge
- Willis Reed

Legend

- (C) Team captain
- (S) Suspended
- (I) Ineligible
- (W) Walk-on
- Injured
- Current redshirt

== Schedule and results ==
| Date time, TV | Rank^{#} | Opponent^{#} | Result | Record | Site city, state |
Regular season
| 11/28/80* | No. 17 | James Madison; Lapchick Tournament Opening Round | W 67-58 | 1-0 | Alumni Hall; Queens, NY |
| 11/29/80* | No. 17 | Pennsylvania; Lapchick Tournament Championship | W 63-62 | 2-0 | Alumni Hall; Queens, NY |
| 12/03/80* | No. 16 | at Manhattan | W 78-58 | 3-0 | Draddy Gymnasium; Bronx, NY |
| 12/06/80* | No. 16 | Princeton | L 46-47 | 3-1 | Alumni Hall; Queens, NY |
| 12/10/80* | | at Columbia | W 58-42 | 4-1 | Levien Gymnasium; New York, NY |
| 12/13/80* | | Rutgers | W 71-70 | 5-1 | Alumni Hall; Queens, NY |
| 12/23/80* | | Fairleigh Dickinson | W 82-67 | 6-1 | Alumni Hall; Queens, NY |
| 12/26/80* | | vs. Pennsylvania; ECAC Holiday Festival Semifinal | W 66-58 | 7-1 | Madison Square Garden; New York, NY |
| 12/27/80* | | vs. North Carolina State; ECAC Holiday Festival Championship | L 55-64 | 7-2 | Madison Square Garden; New York, NY |
| 01/03/81 | | at Villanova | W 90-78 | 8-2 (1-0) | Villanova Field House; Villanova, PA |
| 01/07/81 | | Georgetown | W 68-60 | 9-2 (2-0) | Alumni Hall (6,442); Queens, NY |
| 01/10/81 | | Providence | W 83-63 | 10-2 (3-0) | Alumni Hall; Queens, NY |
| 01/14/81 | | Villanova | W 56-54 ^{OT} | 11-2 (4-0) | Alumni Hall; Queens, NY |
| 01/17/81 | | at Connecticut | L 68-69 | 11-3 (4-1) | Hartford Civic Center; Hartford, CT |
| 01/21/81 | | Seton Hall | W 73-62 | 12-3 (5-1) | Alumni Hall; Queens, NY |
| 01/24/81 | | at Syracuse | L 71-79 | 12-4 (5-2) | Carrier Dome; Syracuse, NY |
| 01/28/81* | | Niagara | W 79-65 | 13-4 | Alumni Hall; Queens, NY |
| 01/31/81* | | at Fordham | W 80-69 | 14-4 | Rose Hill Gymnasium; Bronx, NY |
| 02/02/81 | | Boston College | W 76-71 | 15-4 (6-2) | Alumni Hall; Queens, NY |
| 02/07/81 | | at Georgetown | L 68-75 | 15-5 (6-3) | McDonough Gymnasium (4,607); Washington, D.C. |
| 02/11/81 | | Connecticut | W 72-65 | 16-5 (7-3) | Alumni Hall; Queens, NY |
| 02/14/81* | | vs. No. 2 Oregon State | L 45-57 | 16-6 | Nassau Coliseum; Uniondale, NY |
| 02/16/81 | | at Providence | L 57-73 | 16-7 (7-4) | Providence Civic Center; Providence, RI |
| 02/21/81 | | at Boston College | L 58-59 | 16-8 (7-5) | Roberts Center; Chestnut Hill, MA |
| 02/25/81 | | at Seton Hall | L 63-70 | 16-9 (7-6) | Walsh Gymnasium; South Orange, NJ |
| 02/28/81 | | Syracuse | W 82-73 | 17-9 (8-6) | Alumni Hall; Queens, NY |
Big East tournament
| 03/05/81 | (3) | at (6) Syracuse; Big East tournament Quarterfinal | L 66-71 | 17-10 | Carrier Dome; Syracuse, NY |
NIT tournament
| 03/12/81* | | Alabama; NIT First Round | L 69-73 ^{OT} | 17-11 | Alumni Hall; Queens, NY |
*Non-conference game. ^{#}Rankings from AP Poll. (#) Tournament seedings in parentheses.

== Team players drafted into the NBA ==
| Round | Pick | Player | NBA club | Ref. |
|---|---|---|---|---|
| 3 | 63 | Wayne McKoy | New York Knicks | |
| 8 | 169 | Curtis Redding | Denver Nuggets | |
| 8 | 183 | Frank Gilroy | Philadelphia 76ers | |
