= 1980–81 Connecticut Huskies men's basketball team =

American college basketball season

1980–81 Connecticut Huskies men's basketball

NIT, Second Round
- Conference: Big East Conference
- Record: 20–9 (8–6 Big East)
- Head coach: Dom Perno (4th season)
- Assistant coaches: Greg Ashford; Jim O’Brien; Bill Stuart
- Home arena: Hugh S. Greer Field House; New Haven Coliseum; Hartford Civic Center

1980–81 Big East men's basketball standings
	Conf.				Overall
Team	W		L	PCT	W		L	PCT
Boston College	10	–	4	.714	23	–	7	.767
Georgetown	9	–	5	.643	20	–	12	.625
St. John's	8	–	6	.571	17	–	11	.607
Villanova	8	–	6	.571	20	–	11	.645
Connecticut	8	–	6	.571	20	–	9	.690
Syracuse †	6	–	8	.429	22	–	12	.647
Seton Hall	4	–	10	.286	11	–	16	.407
Providence	3	–	11	.214	10	–	18	.357
† 1981 Big East tournament winner Rankings from AP poll

The 1980–81 Connecticut Huskies men's basketball team represented the University of Connecticut in the 1980–81 collegiate men's basketball season. The Huskies completed the season with a 20–9 overall record. The Huskies were members of the Big East Conference where they finished with an 8–6 record. They made it to the second round of the 1981 National Invitation Tournament. The Huskies played their home games at Hugh S. Greer Field House in Storrs, Connecticut, the New Haven Coliseum in New Haven, Connecticut, and the Hartford Civic Center in Hartford, Connecticut and were led by fourth-year head coach Dom Perno.

== Schedule ==
Date time, TV	Rank^{#}	Opponent^{#}	Result	Record	Site (attendance) city, state
Regular Season
12/6/1980*		at Yale	W 65–53	1–0	Payne Whitney Gymnasium; New Haven, CT
12/9/1980*		Fairfield	W 72–50	2–0	Hartford Civic Center; Hartford, CT
12/11/1980*		Maine	W 55–51	3–0	Hugh S. Greer Field House; Storrs, CT
12/13/1980*		Boston University	W 72–65	4–0	Hugh S. Greer Field House; Storrs, CT
12/29/1980*		Army; Connecticut Mutual Classic	W 81–60	5–0	Hartford Civic Center; Hartford, CT
12/30/1980*		Western Kentucky; Connecticut Mutual Classic	W 84–58	6–0	Hartford Civic Center; Hartford, CT
1/3/1981*		at Rhode Island	W 69–40	7–0	Providence Civic Center; Providence, RI
1/5/1981		Syracuse; Rivalry	W 78–59	8–0 (1–0)	New Haven Coliseum; New Haven, CT
1/8/1981*		Holy Cross	W 66–57	9–0	Hugh S. Greer Field House; Storrs, CT
1/10/1981		Seton Hall	W 57–47	10–0 (2–0)	Hugh S. Greer Field House; Storrs, CT
1/12/1981*		at New Hampshire	W 61–58	11–0	Lundholm Gym; Durham, NH
1/14/1981		at Boston College	L 57–58	11–1 (2–1)	Roberts Center; Boston, MA
1/17/1981		St. John's	W 69–68	12–1 (3–1)	Hartford Civic Center; Hartford, CT
1/21/1981		at Villanova	L 59–63	12–2 (3–2)	Jake Nevin Field House; Villanova, PA
1/24/1981		Georgetown; Rivalry	W 75–73 ^{OT}	13–2 (4–2)	Hugh S. Greer Field House; Storrs, CT
1/27/1981*		Massachusetts	W 98–64	14–2	Hugh S. Greer Field House; Storrs, CT
1/29/1981*		Rhode Island	L 75–78	14–3	Hartford Civic Center; Hartford, CT
1/31/1981*		at Manhattan	W 75–58	15–3	Draddy Gymnasium; New York, NY
2/4/1981		at Providence	W 79–70	16–3 (5–2)	Providence Civic Center; Providence, RI
2/7/1981		Boston College	L 71–76	16–4 (5–3)	Hugh S. Greer Field House; Storrs, CT
2/11/1981		at St. John's	L 65–72	16–5 (5–4)	Carnesecca Arena; New York, NY
2/14/1981		at Syracuse; Rivalry	W 65–63	17–5 (6–4)	Carrier Dome; Syracuse, NY
2/17/1981		at Seton Hall	W 77–70	18–5 (7–4)	Walsh Gymnasium; South Orange, NJ
2/21/1981		Providence	W 71–57	19–5 (8–4)	New Haven Coliseum; New Haven, CT
2/23/1981		Villanova	L 73–74	19–6 (8–5)	Hugh S. Greer Field House; Storrs, CT
2/28/1981		at Georgetown; Rivalry	L 58–60	19–7 (8–6)	McDonough Gymnasium; Washington, D.C.
Big East tournament
3/5/1981		vs. Villanova; Quarterfinals	L 54-65	19–8	Carrier Dome; Syracuse, NY
NIT
3/12/1981*		at South Florida; First Round	W 65–55	20–8	USF Sun Dome; Tampa, FL
3/16/1981*		Minnesota; Second Round	L 66–84	20–9	Hartford Civic Center; Hartford, CT
*Non-conference game. ^{#}Rankings from AP Poll. (#) Tournament seedings in parentheses. All times are in Eastern Time.

Schedule Source:
