= 1980–81 Boston College Eagles men's basketball team =

American college basketball season

1980–81 Boston College Eagles men's basketball

Big East regular season champions

NCAA tournament, Sweet Sixteen
- Conference: Big East Conference
- Record: 23–7 (10–4 Big East)
- Head coach: Tom Davis (4th season)
- Home arena: Roberts Center

1980–81 Big East men's basketball standings
	Conf.				Overall
Team	W		L	PCT	W		L	PCT
Boston College	10	–	4	.714	23	–	7	.767
Georgetown	9	–	5	.643	20	–	12	.625
St. John's	8	–	6	.571	17	–	11	.607
Villanova	8	–	6	.571	20	–	11	.645
Connecticut	8	–	6	.571	20	–	9	.690
Syracuse †	6	–	8	.429	22	–	12	.647
Seton Hall	4	–	10	.286	11	–	16	.407
Providence	3	–	11	.214	10	–	18	.357
† 1981 Big East tournament winner Rankings from AP poll

The 1980–81 Boston College Eagles men's basketball team represented Boston College as members of the Big East Conference during the 1980–81 NCAA Division I men's basketball season.

== Roster ==
1980–81 Boston College Eagles men's basketball team
Players
Coaches

Pos.	#	Name	Height	Weight	Year	Hometown
F	31	Burnett Adams	6 ft 5 in (1.96 m)	186 lb (84 kg)	So	Elizabeth, New Jersey
G	54	John Bagley	6 ft 0 in (1.83 m)	225 lb (102 kg)	So	Bridgeport, Connecticut
C	33	Joe Beaulieu	6 ft 8 in (2.03 m)	240 lb (109 kg)	Sr	Allston, Massachusetts
F	24	Vin Caraher	6 ft 7 in (2.01 m)	217 lb (98 kg)	Sr	East Meadow, New York
G	5	Dwan Chandler	6 ft 1 in (1.85 m)	175 lb (79 kg)	Jr	Boston, Massachusetts
G	23	Tim Chase	6 ft 2 in (1.88 m)	190 lb (86 kg)	Sr	Sudbury, Massachusetts
F	55	Martin Clark	6 ft 9 in (2.06 m)	218 lb (99 kg)	Fr	Dorchester, Massachusetts
F	44	Chris Foy	6 ft 3 in (1.91 m)	200 lb (91 kg)	Sr	Philadelphia, Pennsylvania
G	30	Peter Krause	6 ft 3 in (1.91 m)	190 lb (86 kg)	Fr	Dover, Massachusetts
F	42	Jay Murphy	6 ft 9 in (2.06 m)	208 lb (94 kg)	Fr	Meriden, Connecticut
G	21	Jeff Nocera	5 ft 11 in (1.8 m)	168 lb (76 kg)	So	Waltham, Massachusetts
G		Tim O'Shea	6 ft 0 in (1.83 m)	175 lb (79 kg)	Fr	Wayland, Massachusetts
F	20	Rich Shrigley	6 ft 5 in (1.96 m)	205 lb (93 kg)	Jr	Nashua, New Hampshire

Head coach

- Tom Davis

Assistant coach(es)

- Kevin Mackey

Legend

- (C) Team captain
- (S) Suspended
- (I) Ineligible
- (W) Walk-on
- Injured
- Current redshirt

Roster
Last update: 2018-Mar-17

== Schedule and results ==
Date time, TV	Rank^{#}	Opponent^{#}	Result	Record	Site (attendance) city, state
Regular Season
Nov 30, 1980*		Bentley	W 93–67	1–0	Roberts Center; Chestnut Hill, Massachusetts
Dec 2, 1980*		New Hampshire	W 72–58	2–0	Roberts Center; Chestnut Hill, Massachusetts
Dec 6, 1980*		Fordham	W 79–69	3–0	Roberts Center; Chestnut Hill, Massachusetts
Dec 10, 1980*		at Brown	W 70–56	4–0	Marvel Gymnasium; Providence, Rhode Island
Dec 13, 1980		at Villanova	L 71–74	4–1 (0–1)	Villanova Field House; Philadelphia, Pennsylvania
Dec 29, 1980*		vs. Penn State; Music City Tournament	W 74–67	5–1	Memorial Gymnasium; Nashville, Tennessee
Dec 30, 1980*		at Vanderbilt; Music City Tournament	W 87–72	6–1	Memorial Gymnasium; Nashville, Tennessee
Jan 3, 1981		at Providence	W 98–71	7–1 (1–1)	Providence Civic Center; Providence, Rhode Island
Jan 7, 1981*		at Vermont	W 65–56	8–1	Patrick Gym; Burlington, Vermont
Jan 10, 1981		at Georgetown	L 55–57	8–2 (1–2)	McDonough Gymnasium (4,510); Washington, D.C.
Jan 14, 1981		Connecticut	W 58–57	9–2 (2–2)	Roberts Center; Chestnut Hill, Massachusetts
Jan 17, 1981*		Merrimack			Roberts Center; Chestnut Hill, Massachusetts
Jan 21, 1981		Syracuse	W 66–63	11–2 (3–2)	Roberts Center; Chestnut Hill, Massachusetts
Jan 24, 1981		at Seton Hall	W 73–60	12–2 (4–2)	Walsh Gymnasium; South Orange, New Jersey
Jan 26, 1981		Villanova	W 73–60	13–2 (5–2)	Roberts Center; Chestnut Hill, Massachusetts
Jan 29, 1981*		vs. Boston University; Colonial Classic	W 57–52	14–2	Boston Garden; Boston, Massachusetts
Jan 30, 1981*		Holy Cross	W 48–43	15–2	Roberts Center; Chestnut Hill, Massachusetts
Feb 2, 1981		at St. John's	L 71–76	15–3 (5–3)	Alumni Hall; Queens, New York
Feb 4, 1981		Lowell			Roberts Center; Chestnut Hill, Massachusetts
Feb 7, 1981		at Connecticut	W 76–71	17–3 (6–3)	Hugh S. Greer Field House; Storrs, Connecticut
Feb 11, 1981		Providence	W 70–55	18–3 (7–3)	Roberts Center; Chestnut Hill, Massachusetts
Feb 14, 1981*		at Holy Cross	L 74–86	18–4	Hart Center; Worcester, Massachusetts
Feb 18, 1981		Georgetown	L 55–57	19–4 (8–3)	Roberts Center (4,400); Chestnut Hill, Massachusetts
Feb 21, 1981		St. John's	W 59–58	20–4 (9–3)	Roberts Center; Chestnut Hill, Massachusetts
Feb 25, 1981		at Syracuse	L 86–90	20–5 (9–4)	Carrier Dome; Syracuse, New York
Feb 28, 1981		Seton Hall	W 64–57	21–5 (10–4)	Roberts Center; Chestnut Hill, Massachusetts
Big East Tournament
Mar 5, 1981*	(1)	vs. (8) Providence; Quarterfinal	L 65–67	21–6	Carrier Dome; Syracuse, NY
NCAA Tournament
Mar 13, 1981*	(5 ME)	vs. (12 ME) Ball State; First Round	W 93–90	22–6	Memorial Coliseum; Tuscaloosa, AL
Mar 15, 1981*	(5 ME)	vs. (4 ME) No. 11 Wake Forest; Second Round	W 93–90	23–6	Memorial Coliseum; Tuscaloosa, AL
Mar 20, 1981*	(5 ME)	vs. (9 ME) Saint Joseph's; Sweet Sixteen	L 41–42	23–7	Assembly Hall; Bloomington, IN
*Non-conference game. ^{#}Rankings from AP Poll. (#) Tournament seedings in parentheses. ME=Mideast.

== Awards and honors ==
- John Bagley – Big East Player of the Year
