= 1980–81 Syracuse Orangemen basketball team =

American college basketball season

1980–81 Syracuse Orangemen basketball

Big East Tournament Champions

NIT tournament, Runner-Up
- Conference: Big East Conference
- Record: 22-12 (6-8 Big East)
- Head coach: Jim Boeheim (5th season)
- Home arena: Carrier Dome

1980–81 Big East men's basketball standings
	Conf.				Overall
Team	W		L	PCT	W		L	PCT
Boston College	10	–	4	.714	23	–	7	.767
Georgetown	9	–	5	.643	20	–	12	.625
St. John's	8	–	6	.571	17	–	11	.607
Villanova	8	–	6	.571	20	–	11	.645
Connecticut	8	–	6	.571	20	–	9	.690
Syracuse †	6	–	8	.429	22	–	12	.647
Seton Hall	4	–	10	.286	11	–	16	.407
Providence	3	–	11	.214	10	–	18	.357
† 1981 Big East tournament winner Rankings from AP poll

The 1980–81 Syracuse Orangemen men's basketball team represented Syracuse University in NCAA Division I men's competition in the 1980–81 academic year. They finished with an overall record of 22–12 (6–8 Big East) Syracuse was invited to the 1981 National Invitation Tournament and made it all the way to the championship game. But in the final they dropped a close matchup to Tulsa 86–84 in overtime.

== Personnel ==
1980–81 Syracuse Orange men's basketball team
Players	Coaches
Pos. / # / Name / Height / Weight / Year / Hometown; C / 44 / Danny Schayes / 6 ft 11 in (2.11 m) / 235 lb (107 kg) / Sr / Syracuse, New York	Head coach: Jim Boeheim; Assistant coach(es) Legend: (C) Team captain; (S) Suspended; (I) Ineligible; (W) Walk-on; Injured; Current redshirt; Roster

== Schedule ==
Date time, TV	Rank^{#}	Opponent^{#}	Result	Record	Site city, state
November 29*		Columbia	W 108–81	1–0	Carrier Dome; Syracuse, NY
December 5*		Kent State	W 81–65	2–0	Carrier Dome; Syracuse, NY
December 6*	No. 18	No. 4 Maryland; Carrier Classic	L 73–83	2–1	Carrier Dome; Syracuse, NY
December 10*		at Detroit	W 93–79	3–1	Joe Louis Arena; Detroit, Michigan
December 12*; 8:30 p.m.	No. 20	at Illinois State	W 64–52	4–1	Horton Field House (6,086); Normal, Illinois
December 16*		Penn State	W 77–63	5–1	Carrier Dome; Syracuse, NY
December 29*		Colgate	W 100–84	6–1	Carrier Dome; Syracuse, NY
January 3*		at Canisius	W 88–72	7–1	Buffalo Memorial Auditorium; Buffalo, NY
January 5		at Connecticut; Rivalry	L 59–78	7–2 (0–1)	New Haven Coliseum; New Haven, Connecticut
January 7*		Niagara	W 107–84	8–2 (0–1)	Carrier Dome; Syracuse, NY
January 10		Villanova	L 65–69	8–3 (0–2)	Carrier Dome; Syracuse, NY
January 14		Providence	W 84–66	9–3 (1–2)	Carrier Dome; Syracuse, NY
January 17		at Georgetown; Rivalry	L 57–62	9–4 (1–3)	McDonough Gymnasium; Washington, D. C.
January 21		at Boston College	L 63–66	9–5 (1–4)	Roberts Center; Chestnut Hill, Massachusetts
January 24		St. John's	W 79–71	10–5 (2–4)	Carrier Dome; Syracuse, NY
January 26*		at St. Bonaventure	L 71–74	10–6 (2–4)	Reilly Center; St. Bonaventure, NY
January 30*		Old Dominion	W 71–58	11–6 (2–4)	Carrier Dome; Syracuse, NY
February 1*		at DePaul	L 69–91	11–7 (2–4)	Rosemont Horizon; Rosemont, Illinois
February 4		Seton Hall	W 74–62	12–7 (3–4)	Carrier Dome; Syracuse, NY
February 7		at Providence	W 81–67	13–7 (4–4)	Providence Civic Center; Providence, RI
February 9		Georgetown; Rivalry	W 66–64	14–7 (5–4)	Carrier Dome; Syracuse, NY
February 14		Connecticut; Rivalry	L 63–65	14–8 (5–5)	Carrier Dome; Syracuse, NY
February 17		at Villanova	L 78–88	14–9 (5–6)	The Palestra; Philadelphia, Pennsylvania
February 21		at Seton Hall	L 65–66	14–10 (5–7)	Walsh Gymnasium; South Orange, NJ
February 25		Boston College	W 90–86	15–10 (6–7)	Carrier Dome; Syracuse, NY
February 28		at St. John's	L 73–82	15–11 (6–8)	Carnesecca Arena; New York, NY
Big East tournament
March 5	(6)	(3) St. John's; Quarterfinals	W 71–66	16–11 (6–8)	Carrier Dome; Syracuse, NY
March 6	(6)	(2) Georgetown; Semifinal/Rivalry	W 67–53	17–11 (6–8)	Carrier Dome; Syracuse, NY
March 7	(6)	(4) Villanova; Championship game	W 83–80 ^{3OT}	18–11 (6–8)	Carrier Dome; Syracuse, NY
NIT
March 13*		Marquette; First round	W 88–81	19–11 (6–8)	Carrier Dome; Syracuse, NY
March 16*		Holy Cross; Second round	W 77–57	20–11 (6–8)	Carrier Dome; Syracuse, NY
March 19*		Michigan; Quarterfinals	W 91–76	21–11 (6–8)	Carrier Dome; Syracuse, NY
March 23*		vs. Purdue; Semifinals	W 70–63	22–11 (6–8)	Madison Square Garden; New York, NY
March 25*		vs. Tulsa; Finals	L 84–86 ^{OT}	22–12 (6–8)	Madison Square Garden; New York, NY
*Non-conference game. ^{#}Rankings from AP Poll. (#) Tournament seedings in parentheses. All times are in Eastern Time.
