= 1980–81 Georgetown Hoyas men's basketball team =

American college basketball season

1980–81 Georgetown Hoyas men's basketball

NCAA tournament, First Round
- Conference: Big East
- Record: 20–12 (9–5 Big East)
- Head coach: John Thompson (9th season)
- Assistant coaches: Bill Stein (9th season); Norman Washington (1st season)
- Captains: Eric "Sleepy" Floyd; Eric Smith; Ed Spriggs
- Home arena: McDonough Gymnasium

1980–81 Big East men's basketball standings
	Conf.				Overall
Team	W		L	PCT	W		L	PCT
Boston College	10	–	4	.714	23	–	7	.767
Georgetown	9	–	5	.643	20	–	12	.625
St. John's	8	–	6	.571	17	–	11	.607
Villanova	8	–	6	.571	20	–	11	.645
Connecticut	8	–	6	.571	20	–	9	.690
Syracuse †	6	–	8	.429	22	–	12	.647
Seton Hall	4	–	10	.286	11	–	16	.407
Providence	3	–	11	.214	10	–	18	.357
† 1981 Big East tournament winner Rankings from AP poll

The 1980–81 Georgetown Hoyas men's basketball team represented Georgetown University in the 1980–81 NCAA Division I college basketball season. John Thompson, coached them in his ninth season as head coach. It was the last season in which they played all of their home games at McDonough Gymnasium on the Georgetown campus in Washington, D.C. They were members of the Big East Conference and finished the season with a record of 20–12 overall, 9–5 in Big East play. They advanced to the semifinals of the 1981 Big East tournament before losing to Syracuse. In the 1981 NCAA tournament, they lost in the first round to James Madison.

== Season recap ==
Junior guard and team co-captain Eric "Sleepy" Floyd had been Georgetown's top scorer in each of the two previous seasons, and his scoring prowess continued this season. In the first three games of the season in the Great Alaska Shootout, he scored a combined 52 points, which he followed up in the home opener against Saint Leo with a perfect 11-for-11 from the field. Except for a 7-for-29 performance against Pennsylvania on January 3, 1981, and 7-for-19 against St. John's four days later, Floyd was a strong scorer all season.

Junior guard and team co-captain Eric Smith joined the starting lineup this season and started every game for the rest of his collegiate career. He played a strong defense in 1980-81, shot 48% from the field, averaged 10.8 points per game, and twice scored 28 points in a game. In one of them, against Connecticut, he shot 13 for 21 (61.9%) from the field in what some observers considered the best individual effort seen in the Big East up to that time.

Freshman Fred Brown played both guard and small forward during the year and performed well all season long, starting all 32 games. In his second game, he scored a season-high 16 points against North Carolina in the Great Alaska Shootout. He also scored 14 points and had 10 assists in the win over Boston College and scored the winning tip-in in the overtime game at Seton Hall. He finished the season shooting a team-high 58.4% from the field and was first in assists and second in steals.

Freshman guard Gene Smith emerged as a defensive specialist during the season, earning a starting spot on the roster in the last eight games of the year. In the February 4, 1981, game against Villanova, he held Villanova's Stewart Granger scoreless and forced the Wildcats into committing several offensive fouls. Junior center Mike Hancock had his most productive season, scoring in 30 of 31 games and averaging 8.7 points per game.

The most unusual event of this season took place on February 28, 1981, during the final regular-season game. Big East rival Connecticut was visiting McDonough Gymnasium when, during a timeout, Connecticut's Jonathan the Husky mascot started a fistfight with Georgetown's Jack the Bulldog mascot, leading to Jonathan's ejection from McDonough. Thanks to senior center Mike Frazier's heroics, which included a block and rebound at the end of the game to preserve a 60–58 Georgetown victory, over a hundred Georgetown students gathered outside Frazier's on-campus apartment for an informal post-game pep rally.

The Hoyas advanced to the semifinals of the 1981 Big East men's basketball tournament before losing to Syracuse. They were the No. 7 seed in the East Region of the 1981 NCAA Division I men's basketball tournament – the third of 14 consecutive Georgetown NCAA tournament appearances – and were upset in the first round by the East Region No. 10 seed, James Madison. During the second half of the James Madison game, Sleepy Floyd passed Derrick Jackson as the leading scorer in Georgetown men's basketball history. He finished the season shooting better than 50 percent from the floor for the second straight year, scoring 607 points during the season, averaging 19 points per game, and, between shooting and assists, contributing over 35 percent of the 1980–81 team's offense. For the third straight year, he was Georgetown's top scorer.

One of the most important events of the season took place off the court when, on February 2, 1981, Patrick Ewing, a senior center at Cambridge Rindge and Latin School in Cambridge, Massachusetts, committed to play college basketball at Georgetown the following season. Ewing – destined to become Georgetown′s head coach in 2017 after a lengthy post-graduation career as a player and coach in the National Basketball Association – generally is considered the best men's basketball player in Georgetown history, and his arrival would transform the Georgetown men's basketball program into an established national power.

The 1980–81 team was the last one to use McDonough Gymnasium as its home court. Although McDonough had served in this capacity for 30 seasons, the school announced in August 1981 that the Hoyas were moving to the much larger Capital Centre in Landover, Maryland, for their home schedule the following season. Membership in the Big East and success on the court had increased Georgetown′s visibility, and the anticipation of Ewing's arrival caused the demand for tickets to spike. McDonough remained the Hoyas′ practice facility, and they continued to host occasional games there in future years, but it could no longer accommodate Georgetown′s growing fan base.

== Roster ==
#	Name	Height	Weight (lbs.)	Position	Class	Hometown	Previous Team(s)
10	Kurt Kaull	6'3"	N/A	G	So.	Wheaton, IL, U.S.	Wheaton Warrenville South HS
20	Fred Brown	6'5"	190	G	Fr.	Bronx, NY, U.S.	Adlai E. Stevenson HS
21	Eric "Sleepy" Floyd	6'3"	170	G	Jr.	Gastonia, NC, U.S.	Hunter Huss HS
22	Gene Smith	6'2"	170	G	Fr.	Washington, DC, U.S.	McKinley Technology HS
30	Ron Blaylock	6'3"	N/A	G	Jr.	Winston-Salem, NC, U.S.	East Forsyth HS
32	Eric Smith	6'5"	185	F	Jr.	Potomac, MD, U.S.	Winston Churchill HS
34	Jim Corcoran	6'0"	N/A	G	Jr.	Potomac, MD, U.S.	Georgetown Preparatory School
40	Mike Hancock	6'7"	180	F	Jr.	Washington, DC, U.S.	Roosevelt Senior HS
41	Jeff Bullis	6'7"	N/A	F	Jr.	Forest Hill, MD, U.S.	Bel Air HS
42	David Blue	6'7"	N/A	F	So.	Frederick, MD, U.S.	Prospect Hall HS
50	Ed Spriggs	6'9"	240	C/F	Jr.	North Brentwood, MD, U.S.	Northwestern HS
51	Mike Frazier	6'7"	N/A	F	Sr.	Cleveland, OH, U.S.	University School
55	Ray Knight	6'9"	N/A	C/F	Fr.	Washington, DC, U.S.	St. Anthony's HS

== Rankings ==
Ranking movement Legend: ██ Improvement in ranking. ██ Decrease in ranking. ██ Not ranked the previous week. RV=Others receiving votes.
Poll	Pre	Wk 1	Wk 2	Wk 3	Wk 4	Wk 5	Wk 6	Wk 7	Wk 8	Wk 9	Wk 10	Wk 11	Wk 12	Wk 13	Wk 14	Final
AP	16	19														
Coaches	16	(Note: No Coaches' Poll this week.)	18													

== Schedule and results ==
Sources

- All times are Eastern

Date time, TV	Rank^{#}	Opponent^{#}	Result	Record	Site (attendance) city, state
Regular Season
Fri., Nov. 28, 1980*	No. 16	vs. Nicholls State; Great Alaska Shootout	W 98–63	1–0	Buckner Fieldhouse (3,500); Fort Richardson, AK
Sat., Nov. 29, 1980*	No. 16	at No. 13 North Carolina; Great Alaska Shootout	L 71–83	1–1	Buckner Fieldhouse (2,500); Fort Richardson, AK
Sun., Nov. 30, 1980*	No. 16	vs. No. 12 Louisiana State; Great Alaska Shootout	L 61–76	1–2	Buckner Fieldhouse (2,000); Fort Richardson, AK
Thu., Dec. 4, 1980*	No. 19	Saint Leo	W 108–76	2–2	McDonough Gymnasium (N/A); Washington, DC
Sat., Dec. 6, 1980*	No. 19	Wheeling Jesuit	W 94–58	3–2	McDonough Gymnasium (4,106); Washington, DC
Wed., Dec. 10, 1980*		Southern-New Orleans	W 79–43	4–2	McDonough Gymnasium (3,810); Washington, DC
Sat., Dec. 13, 1980*		at George Washington	W 84–82 ^{2OT}	5–2	Charles E. Smith Athletic Center (4,600); Washington, DC
Sat., Dec. 20, 1980*		at Drake	L 57−73	5–3	Veterans Memorial Auditorium (N/A); Des Moines, IA
Tue., Dec. 23, 1980*		Texas Southern	W 80–61	6–3	McDonough Gymnasium (3,323); Washington, DC
Mon., Dec. 29, 1980*		vs. No. 1 DePaul; Cabrillo Classic	L 67−72	6–4	San Diego Sports Arena (N/A); San Diego, CA
Tue., Dec. 30, 1980*		vs. La Salle; Cabrillo Classic	W 79–63	7–4	San Diego Sports Arena (11,044); San Diego, CA
Sat, Jan. 3, 1981*		Pennsylvania	L 58–60	7–5	McDonough Gymnasium (4,403); Washington, DC
Wed., Jan. 7, 1981		at St. John's	L 60–68	7–6 (0–1)	Alumni Hall (6,442); Queens, NY
Sat., Jan. 10, 1981		Boston College	W 57–55	8–6 (1–1)	McDonough Gymnasium (4,510); Washington, DC
Mon., Jan. 12, 1981		at Seton Hall	W 52–51 ^{OT}	9–6 (2–1)	Walsh Gymnasium (3,000); South Orange, NJ
Sat., Jan. 17, 1981		Syracuse; Rivalry	W 62–57	10–6 (3–1)	McDonough Gymnasium (N/A); Washington, DC
Mon., Jan. 19, 1981		Providence	L 58–61	10–7 (3–2)	McDonough Gymnasium (4,419); Washington, DC
Wed., Jan. 21, 1981*		Southern Connecticut State	W 84–41	11–7	McDonough Gymnasium (3,321); Washington, DC
Sat., Jan. 24, 1981		at No. 20 Connecticut; Rivalry	L 73–75 ^{OT}	11–8 (3–3)	University of Connecticut Field House (4,660); Storrs, CT
Wed., Jan 28, 1981*		at American	W 74–72	12–8	Fort Myer Ceremonial Hall (4,250); Fort Myer, VA
Sat., Jan. 31, 1981*		at Nevada-Las Vegas	W 69–68	13–8	Las Vegas Convention Center (N/A); Las Vegas, NV
Wed., Feb. 4, 1981		Villanova	W 70–54	14–8 (4–3)	McDonough Gymnasium (4,504); Washington, DC
Sat., Feb. 7, 1981		St. John's	W 75–68	15–8 (5–3)	McDonough Gymnasium (4,607); Washington, DC
Mon., Feb. 9, 1981		at Syracuse; Rivalry	L 64–66	15–9 (5–4)	Carrier Dome (N/A); Syracuse, NY
Sat., Feb. 14, 1981		Seton Hall	W 58–56	16–9 (6–4)	McDonough Gymnasium (4,414); Washington, DC
Wed., Feb. 18, 1981		at Boston College	L 49–53	16–10 (6–5)	Roberts Center (4,400); Chestnut Hill, MA
Sat., Feb. 21, 1981		at Villanova	W 68–60	17–10 (7–5)	Palestra (6,228); Philadelphia, PA
Wed., Feb. 25, 1981		at Providence	W 71–63	18–10 (8–5)	Providence Civic Center (12,812); Providence, RI
Sat., Feb. 28, 1981		Connecticut; Rivalry	W 60–58	19–10 (9–5)	McDonough Gymnasium (4,528); Washington, DC
Big East tournament
Thu., Mar. 5, 1981	(2)	vs. (7) Seton Hall; Quarterfinal	W 58–52	20–10	Carrier Dome (11,713); Syracuse, NY
Fri., Mar. 6, 1981	(2)	vs. (6) Syracuse; Semifinal/Rivalry	L 53–57	20–11	Carrier Dome (N/A); Syracuse, NY
NCAA tournament
Thu., Mar. 12, 1981	(7 E)	vs. (10 E) James Madison; First round	L 55–61	20–12	Providence Civic Center (8,273); Providence, RI
*Non-conference game. ^{#}Rankings from AP Poll. (#) Tournament seedings in parentheses.
