= Jim Boeheim =

American basketball coach (born 1944)

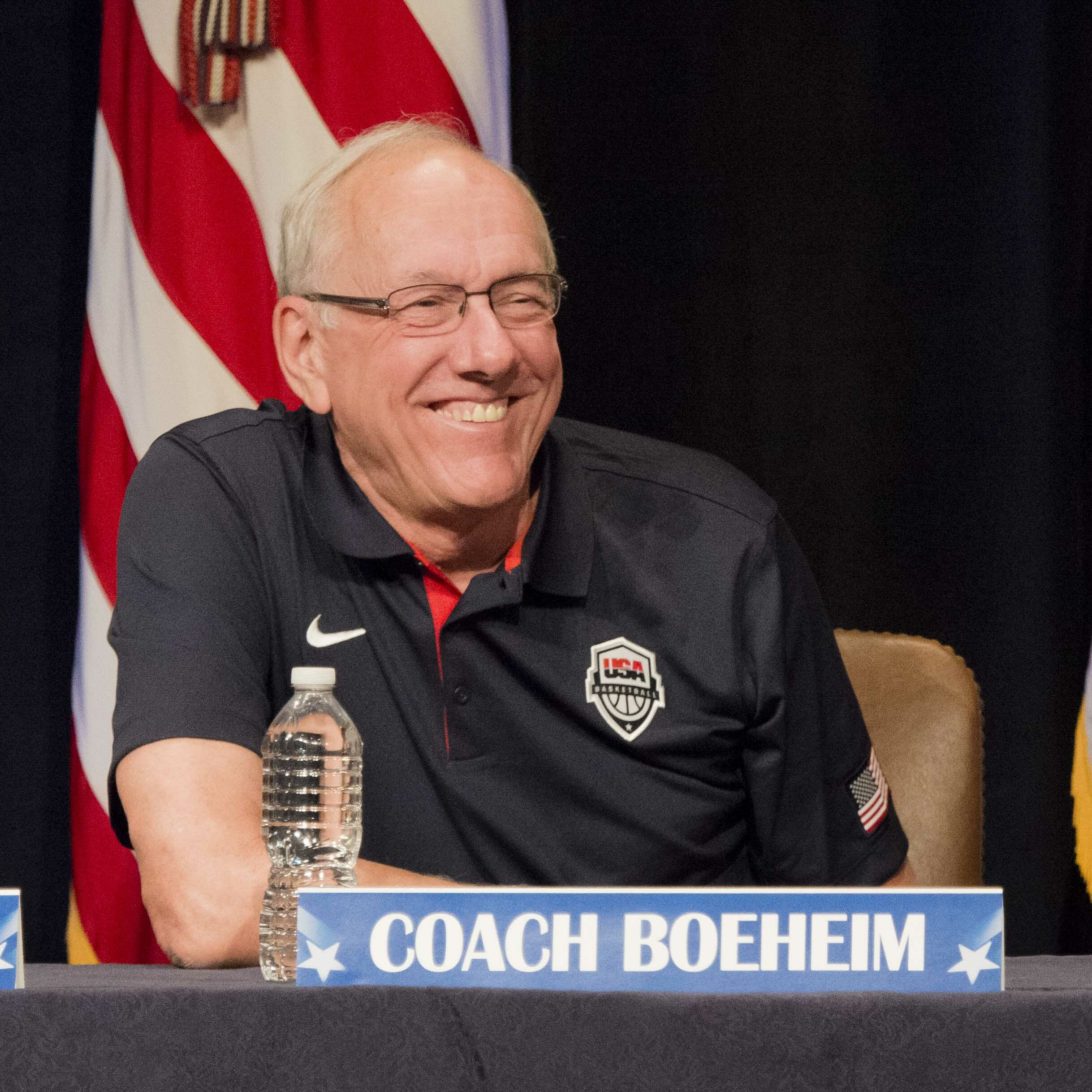
- Boeheim in 2014

Biographical details
- Born: November 17, 1944 (age 82); Lyons, New York, U.S.

Playing career
- 1963–1966: Syracuse
- 1966–1972: Scranton Miners / Apollos
- Position: Guard

Coaching career (HC unless noted)
- 1969–1976: Syracuse (assistant)
- 1976–2023: Syracuse

Head coaching record
- Overall: 1,015–441 (.697) (Note: Some websites list Boeheim's record at 1,116–441 (.717), which include the 101 wins later vacated by NCAA.)
- Tournaments: 48*–28 (NCAA Division I); 13–8 (NIT)

Accomplishments and honors

Championships
- NCAA Division I tournament (2003); 5 NCAA Division I tournament Final Four (1987, 1996, 2003, 2013, 2016); 10 Big East regular season (1980, 1986, 1987, 1990, 1991, 1998, 2000, 2003, 2010, 2012); 5 Big East tournament (1981, 1988, 1992, 2005, 2006); ECAC tournament (1977)

Awards
- Naismith College Coach of the Year (2010); AP Coach of the Year (2010); NABC Coach of the Year (2010) Henry Iba Award (2010); The Sporting News National Coach of the Year (2010); Hall of Fame The Mannie Jackson - Basketball's Human Spirit Award (2010); Clair Bee Coach of the Year (2000); USA Basketball National Coach of the Year (2001); 4× Big East Coach of the Year (1984, 1991, 2000, 2010); John R. Wooden Legends of Coaching Award (2006)
- Basketball Hall of Fame; Inducted in 2005 (profile)
- College Basketball Hall of Fame; Inducted in 2006
Medal record
Assistant coach for United States
men's national basketball team
Olympic Games
Gold medal – first place	2008 Beijing	Team
Gold medal – first place	2012 London	Team
Gold medal – first place	2016 Rio de Janeiro	Team
FIBA World Championship
Gold medal – first place	2010 Turkey	Team
Gold medal – first place	2014 Spain	Team
Bronze medal – third place	1990 Argentina	Team
Bronze medal – third place	2006 Japan	Team
FIBA Americas Championship
Gold medal – first place	2007 Las Vegas	Men's basketball

James Arthur Boeheim Jr. (/ˈbeɪhaɪm/ BAY-hyme; born November 17, 1944) is an American former college basketball coach and current Special Assistant to the Athletic Director at Syracuse University. From 1976 until 2023, he was the head coach of the Syracuse Orange men's team of the Atlantic Coast Conference (ACC). Boeheim guided the Orange to ten Big East Conference regular season championships, five Big East tournament championships, and 34 NCAA tournament appearances, including five Final Four appearances and three appearances in the national title game. In those games, the Orangemen lost to Indiana in 1987, and to Kentucky in 1996, before defeating Kansas in 2003 with All-American Carmelo Anthony.

Boeheim has served as the president of the National Association of Basketball Coaches (NABC), chairman of the USA Basketball committees, and on various board of directors. He served as an assistant coach for the United States men's national basketball team at the Summer Olympics (2008, 2012, 2016) and the FIBA World Championships (1990, 2006, 2010). He has been inducted into the Basketball Hall of Fame twice: in 2005 for his individual coaching career, and in 2025 as part of the coaching staff of the Redeem Team.

Boeheim intended to retire in 2018 but departure of expected successor Mike Hopkins for the head coaching position at Washington would keep him at Syracuse until his eventual retirement in 2023. During the 2021–22 season Boeheim coached both of his sons, Jimmy and Buddy Boeheim. Boeheim would become the winningest active coach in Division I basketball on April 2, 2022, after the retirement of Mike Krzyzewski. As a result of the Syracuse athletics scandal in 2015, the NCAA vacated 101 of his wins.

After suffering from cancer in 2001, Boeheim founded with his wife the Jim and Juli Boeheim Foundation, which is devoted to child welfare, cancer treatment, and prevention.

== Early life ==
Boeheim was born in 1944 in a German-American family to parents Janet and James Boeheim Sr. in Lyons, New York, a small town about 57 miles west of Syracuse. His family owned a funeral home, started by his great-grandfather in the mid-1800s. He graduated from Lyons Central High School, where he starred for coach Dick Blackwell's team.

== Career ==
=== Playing ===
Boeheim enrolled in Syracuse University as a student in 1962, and graduated with a bachelor's degree in social science. During his freshman year, Boeheim was a walk-on with the freshman basketball team. By his senior year, he was the varsity team captain and a teammate of All-American Dave Bing, his freshman roommate. The pair led coach Fred Lewis's Orangemen (Note: Syracuse did not change its nickname to "Orange" until the 2004–05 school year.) to a 22–6 overall win–loss record that earned the team's second-ever NCAA tournament berth. While at Syracuse, he joined the Delta Upsilon fraternity. He played as a student at SU for two seasons and in 1970s served as the university's last golf coach.

After graduating from Syracuse, Boeheim played professionally with the Scranton Miners of the Eastern Professional Basketball League, during which he won two championships and was a second-team all-star. While working as a graduate assistant, he earned a graduate degree from Syracuse in 1973.

=== Coaching ===
In 1969, Boeheim decided to coach basketball and was hired as a graduate assistant at Syracuse under Roy Danforth. Soon thereafter he was promoted to a full-time assistant coach and was a member of the coaching staff that helped guide the Orangemen to the 1975 NCAA tournament, where Syracuse University made its first Final Four appearance.

In 1976, Danforth left to become the head basketball coach and athletic director at Tulane University. A coaching search then led to naught, and Boeheim was promoted by athletic director Les Dye in a 3–2 split hiring decision to become Syracuse's seventh head coach. He won the first game against Harvard by 20 points, and finished the season with a 26–4 record and a Sweet 16 appearance.

Apart from his brief stint in the pros, Boeheim has spent his entire adult life at Syracuse, as either a student-athlete (1962–1966), assistant coach (1969–1976) or head coach (1976–2023), a rarity in modern-day major collegiate athletics. In 2018, CBSSports.com writer Matt Norlander emphasized this in a piece where he speculated on potential successors for Boeheim, stating:

Boeheim does not have a parallel in major college athletics. There has never been a Division I coach in men's basketball, women's basketball or football who has spent more than 40 years at their alma mater and never coached anywhere else. Boeheim's the only one. There is no coaching figure more synonymous and literally affiliated with only one school.

Norlander also noted that Boeheim entered the 2018–19 season with nearly as many wins on his official coaching record, and more when counting wins vacated by the NCAA, than all of his predecessors combined, and in his various roles at Syracuse had been involved in over half of all games in Syracuse's 114-year basketball history.

In 1986, Boeheim was offered the head coaching job at Ohio State but turned it down to stay at Syracuse.

During a Syracuse–Georgetown game on January 10, 1983, Hoyas star Patrick Ewing was nearly struck by an orange, and at times had endured racial taunts from the SU student section. Boeheim borrowed a microphone and threatened to forfeit the game if fans continued to throw objects at Ewing.

In his first 41 years as head coach at Syracuse, Boeheim guided the Orange to postseason berths, either in the NCAA or NIT tournaments, in every year in which the Orange have been eligible. The only times Syracuse missed the postseason were in 1993 when NCAA sanctions barred them from postseason play despite a 20–9 record and in 2015 when Syracuse University self-imposed a one-year postseason ban related to the 2015 NCAA sanctions against the university's sports programs. In 2022, he had his first losing season, and missed the postseason. During his tenure, the Orange have appeared in three NCAA national championship games (1987, 1996, and 2003) and won the national title in 2003.

Boeheim has been named Big East coach of the year four times, and has been named as District II Coach of the Year by the National Association of Basketball Coaches ten times. In 2004, Boeheim received two additional awards. The first was during the spring when he was awarded the Clair Bee Award in recognition of his contributions to the sport of basketball. During the fall of the same year Boeheim was presented with Syracuse University's Arents Award, the university's highest alumni honor.

Boeheim's coaching style at Syracuse is unusual in that, whereas many highly successful coaches prefer the man-to-man defense, he demonstrates a preference for the match-up 2–3 zone. Having been fond of the zone, he implemented the defensive style early on among other, but went almost exclusively to the zone only around 1996.

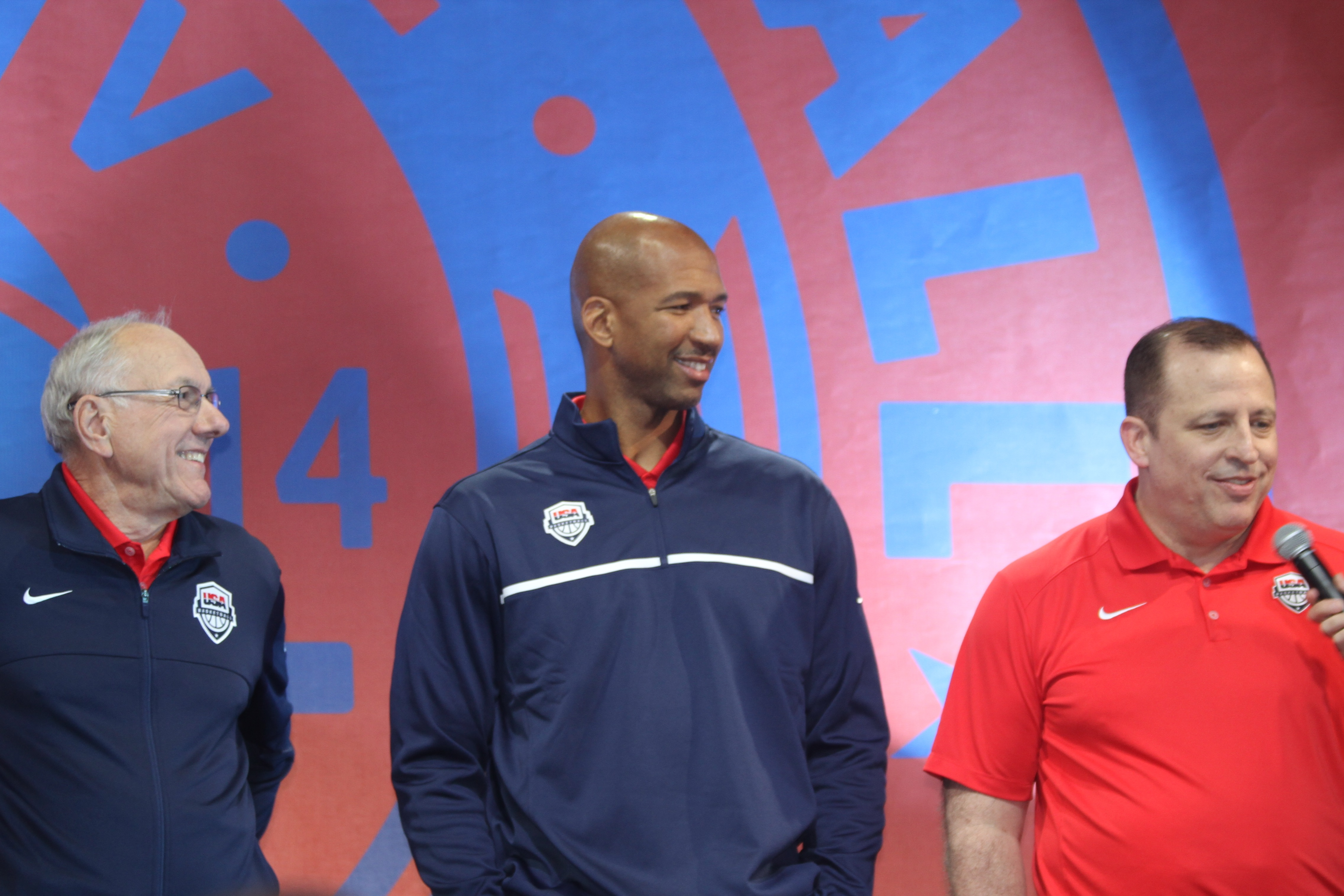
Boeheim, Monty Williams, and Tom Thibodeau served as assistant coaches for the 2014 United States FIBA World Cup team.

In an exhibition game on November 7, 2005, against Division II school Saint Rose from Albany, New York, Boeheim was ejected for the first time in his career after arguing a call late in the first half in the Orange's 86–73 victory. He was also ejected from Cameron Indoor Stadium on February 22, 2014, against Duke after arguing a player control foul call.

Boeheim has also been a coach for USA national teams. In 2001, during his seventh year as a USA basketball coach, Boeheim helped lead the Young Men's Team to a gold medal at the World Championship in Japan. During the fall of that year, he was named USA Basketball 2001 National Coach of the Year. He was an assistant coach under Mike Krzyzewski for the US national team in the 1990 FIBA World Championship and 2006 FIBA World Championship, winning the bronze medal both times. He returned as an assistant coach under Mike Krzyzewski for the 2008 Summer Olympics in Beijing, China, and again at the 2012 Summer Olympics in London, England, where the United States won the gold medal both times.

Boeheim has served as the chairman of the USA Basketball 2009–12 Men's Junior National Committee, as well as the 2007–08 President of the National Association of Basketball Coaches (NABC), where he also served on the board of directors.

In the 2012–13 season, Boeheim led Syracuse to its first Final Four appearance since its 2003 NCAA National Championship. The Orange lost 61–56 to Michigan. In the 2013–14 season, he led the Orange to the NCAA Tournament and lost in the third-round game to the Dayton Flyers.

After Syracuse sat out the 2015 tournament via a self-imposed postseason ban, Boeheim again led Syracuse to a surprise Final Four berth in the 2015–16 season. This included a 15-point comeback versus the No. 1 seeded Virginia Cavaliers. The team lost to North Carolina 83–66.

The following season Syracuse started ranked 19th in the AP Poll, but failed to make the NCAA tournament. In the 2017–18 season Syracuse would return to the NCAA tournament despite going 8–10 in conference play. In the tournament Syracuse upset 4-seeded Michigan State before losing to Duke in the Sweet 16. The next year saw the Orange make back-to-back NCAA tournament appearances for the first time since the 2013–14 season. On January 14, 2019, Syracuse upset Duke in Cameron Indoor Stadium, marking the first time that the Blue Devils had lost to an unranked team at home. They would lose to Baylor in the opening round of the NCAA tournament. Syracuse started the 2019–20 season slow, losing 48–34 to Virginia, the lowest amount ever scored by a team in Boeheim's career. SU would win its final game of the season in the ACC tournament beating North Carolina 81–53 and defeating the Tar Heels for the first time since 2014. This would be the last game played due to COVID-19/ In the 2020–21 season SU would once again upset its way to the Sweet 16 beating 3-seeded West Virginia before losing to eventual Final Four participant Houston.

The Syracuse basketball program has been investigated for major NCAA violations on two occasions during Boeheim's tenure.

=== NCAA violations and punishment ===
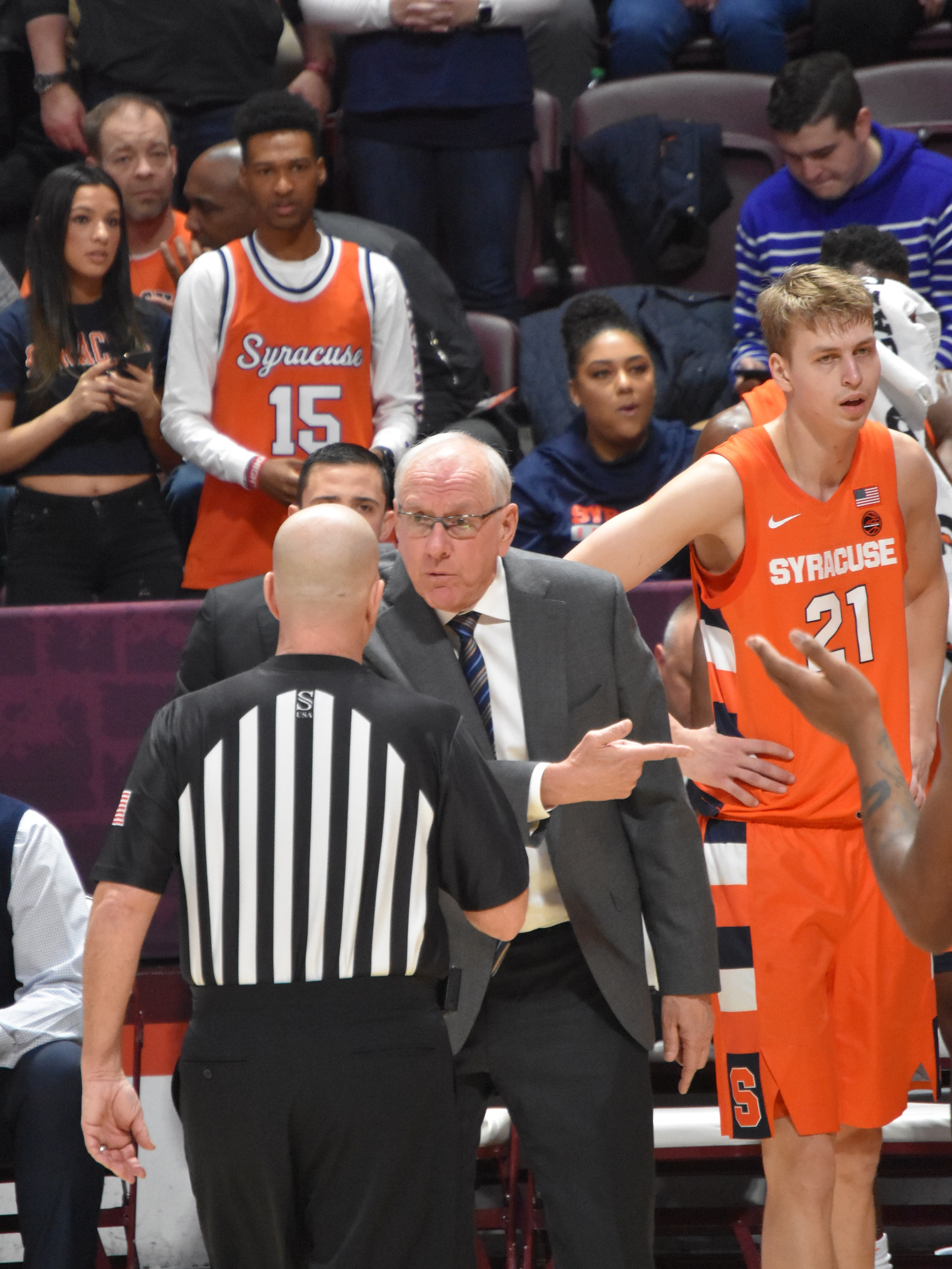
Boeheim seeks an explanation from a referee at Cassell Coliseum in 2020.

On March 6, 2015, the NCAA suspended Boeheim for the first nine games of 2015–16 ACC conference play and took away 12 scholarships over a four-year period, as a result of a multi-year investigation into the university's athletic programs. The program was forced to vacate a total of 101 wins from the 2004–2005, 2005–2006, 2006–2007, 2010–2011, and 2011–2012 seasons, which included any game during those years where one or more players deemed to have been ineligible played. This constitutes the third-most wins ever permanently vacated by one program, behind the 113 wins vacated by Michigan and 123 wins by Louisville. Ten of the vacated wins were NCAA tournament games. However, the NCAA confirmed that sanctions did not include the removal of any trophies or banners. Therefore, Syracuse displays banners for all of its NCAA appearances and conference titles from those years.

After two appeals, Boeheim's nine-game suspension was upheld, though he was permitted to begin the suspension prior to ACC conference play as dictated in the original penalty. Additionally, the permanent vacation and erasure of 101 wins was upheld. However, the number of scholarships lost by Syracuse was reduced to 8 over a four-year period, down from 12 over the same period.

=== Planned departure, reversal, and eventual retirement ===
Boeheim announced in 2015 that he would retire in March 2018. However, following the departure of his long-time assistant coach and expected successor Mike Hopkins in 2017, Boeheim's contract was extended by Syracuse beyond 2017 for an unknown period. In 2017, when his son Buddy committed to play at Syracuse starting in 2018, he extended his contract to beyond the 2017–18 season.

Boeheim was replaced following the 2022–23 season by former Syracuse point guard and assistant coach Adrian Autry. The New York Times reported that whether Boeheim had retired or been ousted was not immediately clear, but in a press conference a day later, Boeheim announced that he was thrilled to be retired.

Boeheim stayed at Syracuse, with a new job title of special assistant to the athletic director. Boeheim's legacy was noted by sports media; Pete Thamel noted that Boeheim left a complicated legacy and his exit was far more fitting, Pat Forde called him an ultimate loyalist, ESPN's McMenamin said his exit was an "end of a coaching generation", while Syracuse Post-Standard's editorial board opined that "Boeheim put Syracuse on the map". In November 2023 it was announced he would join the ACC Network's studio show Nothing But Net as analyst along with working with Wes Durham as analyst for games.

== Awards and honors ==
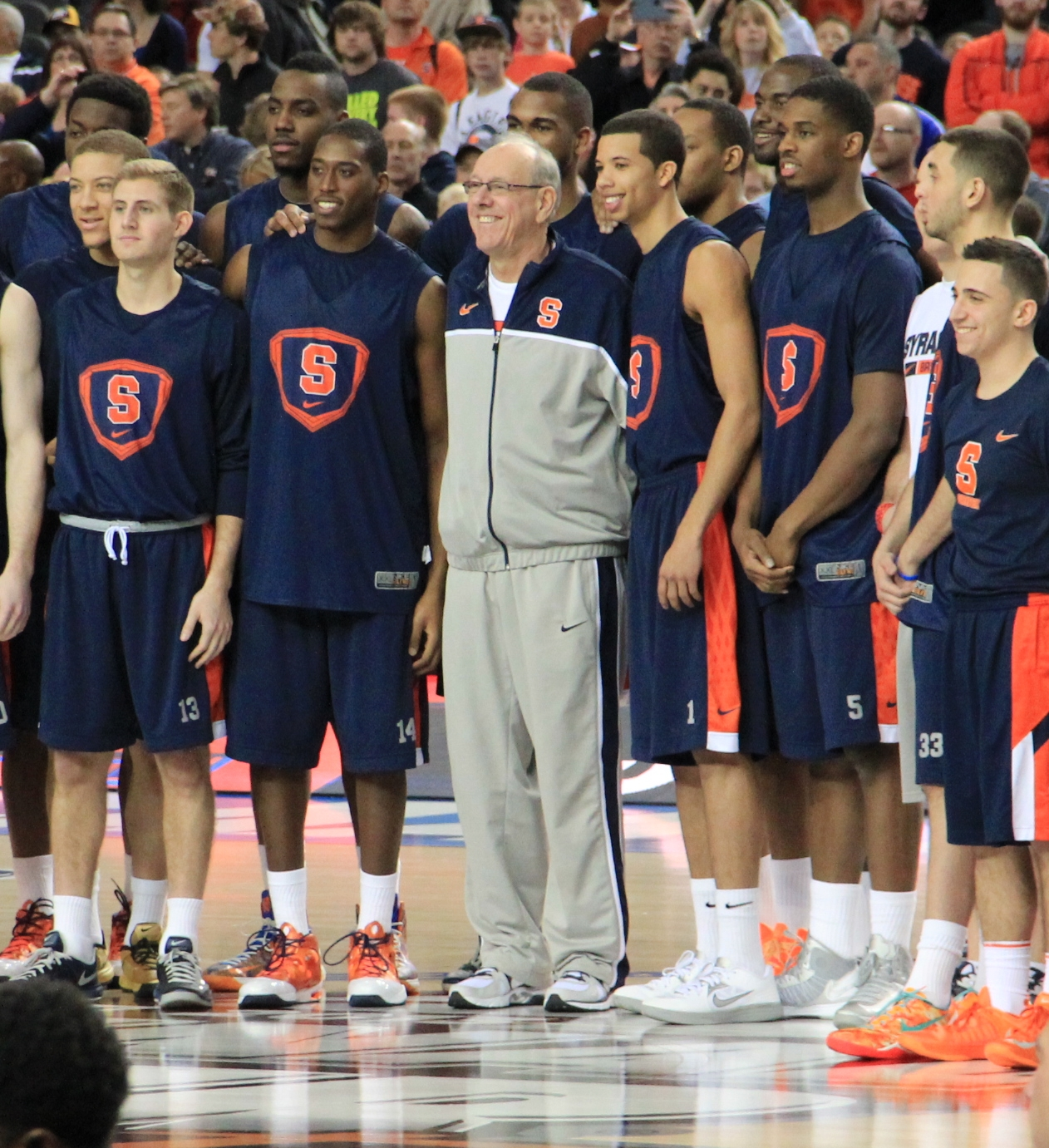
Boeheim with his team at the 2013 NCAA tournament

=== NCAA ===
Boeheim's notable accomplishments during his career include:

- National championship (2003)
- National championship game appearances (3): (1987, 1996, 2003)
- Final Four appearances (5): (1987, 1996, 2003, 2013, 2016)
- Elite Eight appearances (7): (1987, 1989, 1996, 2003, 2012, 2013, 2016)
- Sweet Sixteen appearances (20): (1977, 1979, 1980, 1984, 1987, 1989, 1990, 1994, 1996, 1998, 2000, 2003, 2004, 2009, 2010, 2012, 2013, 2016, 2018, 2021)
- NCAA tournament appearances (33): (1977, 1978, 1979, 1980, 1983, 1984, 1985, 1986, 1987, 1988, 1989, 1990, 1991, 1992, 1994, 1995, 1996, 1998, 1999, 2000, 2001, 2003, 2004, 2005, 2006, 2009, 2010, 2011, 2012, 2013, 2014, 2016, 2018, 2019, 2021)
- Big East regular season championships (10) : (1980, 1986, 1987, 1990, 1991, 1998*, 2000, 2003, 2010, 2012)
- Big East tournament championships (5): (1981, 1988, 1992, 2005, 2006)
- Big East Coach of the Year (4): (1984, 1991, 2000, 2010)
- NBA players produced: 49 in 47 seasons.

=== Halls of Fame ===
- Basketball Hall of Fame (2005) as a coach
- Named 2010 Naismith Coach of the Year (along with the same honor from the AP, Sporting News and many others) after leading Syracuse to an unexpected 30–5 record.
- The Mannie Jackson – Basketball's Human Spirit Award (2010)
- USA Basketball's National Coach of the Year (2001)

=== Win milestones ===
- 500: Boeheim reached the 500-win milestone in his 21st year as the coach. He was the 71st coach to reach the mark and second-fastest only after Jerry Tarkanian.
- 750: Became only the 14th coach ever to reach 750 wins (2007)
- 800: Joined Mike Krzyzewski and Jim Calhoun as the third active coach with 800 wins (2009)
- 900: On December 17, 2012, Boeheim became the third coach in NCAA men's basketball history to reach 900 wins, along with Bob Knight and Mike Krzyzewski. 101 of those wins were vacated in 2015 after an NCAA investigation. On February 7, 2017, Boeheim officially reached this milestone again.
- 1,000: On November 19, 2022, Boeheim achieved his 1,000th win (Note: Boeheim had already achieved the mark in terms of actual games on February 4, 2017 against #9 Virginia, but Syracuse and Boeheim under NCAA sanctions in 2015 were permanently vacated 101 wins, resulting in Mike Krzyzewski statistically becoming the first ever.) against Northeastern. He is the second coach after Mike Krzyzewski to pass that mark.

=== Other ===
- Leads all Big East coaches (past and present) in wins (366)
- Ranks sixth among active Division I coaches (min. 10 years) in winning percentage (.750)
- In 43 seasons at Syracuse, has compiled 34 20-win seasons, good for second most on the all-time list.
- Under Boeheim, the Orange only missed the NCAA tournament two years in a row twice.
- In recognition of Boeheim's numerous accomplishments as SU's head coach, the university named the Carrier Dome court "Jim Boeheim Court" on February 24, 2002.
- Coached the Orange to a 127–117 six-overtime win against the UConn Huskies, the longest game in the history of Big East Conference play.
- On March 19, 2021, Boeheim became the first men's coach to win an NCAA tournament game in six different decades (1970s–2020s).

== Coaching tree ==
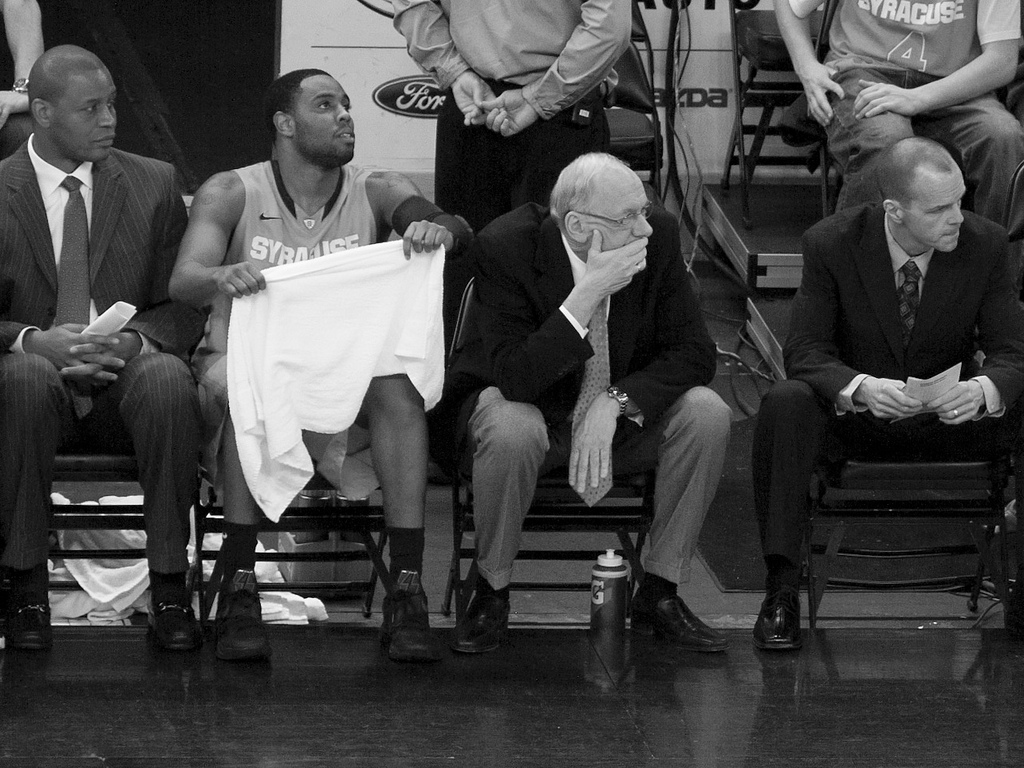
Boeheim with guard Scoop Jardine, and assistant coaches Adrian Autry and Mike Hopkins.

These former assistant coaches or players of Boeheim later became head coaches at the collegiate level or higher.

- Adrian Autry: Syracuse (2023–2026)
- Scott Hicks: Le Moyne (1992–1997); Albany (1997–2000); Loyola (MD) (2000–2004)
- Mike Hopkins: Washington (2017–2024)
- Brendan Malone: Rhode Island (1984–1986); Toronto Raptors (1995–1996); Cleveland Cavaliers (2005, interim)
- Gerry McNamara: Siena (2024–2026); Syracuse (2026-present)
- Wayne Morgan: Long Beach State (1996–2002); Iowa State (2003–2006)
- Rob Murphy: Eastern Michigan (2011–2021)
- Tim O'Toole: Fairfield (1998–2006)
- Louis Orr: Siena (2000–2001); Seton Hall (2001–2006); Bowling Green (2007–2014)
- Rick Pitino: Boston University (1978–1983); Providence (1985–1987); New York Knicks (1987–1989); Kentucky (1989–1997); Boston Celtics (1997–2001); Louisville (2001–2017); Iona (2020–2023); St. John's (2023–present)
- Stephen Thompson: Cal State Los Angeles (2005–2014)
- Tim Welsh: Iona (1995–1998); Providence (1998–2008)
- Troy Weaver: Detroit Pistons general manager (2020–present)

Additionally, all three assistants on Boeheim's 2022–23 coaching staff played at Syracuse under Boeheim: Adrian Autry, Gerry McNamara, and Allen Griffin.

== Personal life and charity ==
Boeheim appeared in the movie Blue Chips, with Nick Nolte and Shaquille O'Neal, playing himself. Boeheim also appeared in the Spike Lee movie He Got Game, again playing himself. Boeheim has appeared in numerous commercials throughout Central New York and also had a spot in a nationwide Nike Jordan ad featuring former Syracuse great Carmelo Anthony.

Boeheim had prostate cancer in 2001 and subsequently became a major fundraiser for Coaches vs. Cancer, a non-profit collaboration between the NABC and the American Cancer Society, through which he has helped raise more than US$4.5 million for ACS's Central New York chapter since 2000. In 2009, Boeheim and his wife, Juli, founded the Jim and Juli Boeheim Foundation to expand their charitable mission to organizations around Central New York concerned with child welfare, as well as cancer treatment and prevention.

Boeheim married his wife Juli in 1997, and they have three children together: Jimmy and a set of twins, son Buddy and daughter Jamie. Boeheim also has a daughter with former wife Elaine. His son Jimmy played forward for Cornell from 2017 to 2020, but did not get to play what would have been his senior season at Cornell because the Ivy League canceled its 2020–21 season due to COVID-19. He entered the NCAA transfer portal in the fall of 2020, transferred to Syracuse, and played the 2021–22 season for the Orange. Jamie played forward for the University of Rochester. Buddy played guard for his father at Syracuse and signed a two-way contract with the Detroit Pistons after going undrafted in the 2022 NBA draft.

Around 11:22 p.m. on February 20, 2019, Boeheim was driving his car on Interstate 690 in Syracuse when he struck and killed a 51-year-old man who was standing near the side of the road. The accident was reportedly a result of a disabled car being in the middle of the road in bad weather. When Boeheim maneuvered around the other car, he struck the man, who had been a passenger in the disabled car. Field, speed, and sobriety tests were administered by police. Boeheim was speeding, but Onondaga County District Attorney William Fitzpatrick determined the collision would have been fatal even if Boeheim was going the speed limit at the time. It was additionally found that the disabled vehicle did not have lights on and had non-operational rear marker lights, and that the passengers of the disabled car, including the man who was struck and killed, were wearing dark clothing. Boeheim was not charged relating to the incident. In April 2023, lawyers for Boeheim agreed to settle a lawsuit filed by the family of a man killed in the crash.

Boeheim has received criticism for his aggressive nature toward the press and often got into spats with beat writers. In March 2021, he was criticized for mocking a reporter's height during a postgame press conference following a win against Clemson.

== Head coaching record ==
Record table
Season	Team	Overall	Conference	Standing	Postseason
Syracuse Orangemen (NCAA Division I independent) (1976–1979)
1976–77 †	Syracuse	26–4			NCAA Division I Sweet 16
1977–78	Syracuse	22–6			NCAA Division I Round of 32
1978–79	Syracuse	26–4			NCAA Division I Sweet 16
Syracuse Orangemen/Orange (Big East Conference) (1979–2013)
1979–80	Syracuse	26–4	5–1	T–1st	NCAA Division I Sweet 16
1980–81	Syracuse	22–12	6–8	6th	NIT Runner-up
1981–82	Syracuse	16–13	7–7	T–5th	NIT Round of 32
1982–83	Syracuse	21–10	9–7	5th	NCAA Division I Round of 32
1983–84	Syracuse	23–9	12–4	T–2nd	NCAA Division I Sweet 16
1984–85	Syracuse	22–9	9–7	T–3rd	NCAA Division I Round of 32
1985–86	Syracuse	26–6	14–2	T–1st	NCAA Division I Round of 32
1986–87	Syracuse	31–7	12–4	T–1st	NCAA Division I Runner-up
1987–88	Syracuse	26–9	11–5	2nd	NCAA Division I Round of 32
1988–89	Syracuse	30–8	10–6	3rd	NCAA Division I Elite Eight
1989–90	Syracuse	26–7	12–4	T–1st	NCAA Division I Sweet 16
1990–91	Syracuse	26–6	12–4	1st	NCAA Division I Round of 64
1991–92	Syracuse	22–10	10–8	T–5th	NCAA Division I Round of 32
1992–93	Syracuse	20–9	10–8	3rd	Ineligible
1993–94	Syracuse	23–7	13–5	2nd	NCAA Division I Sweet 16
1994–95	Syracuse	20–10	12–6	3rd	NCAA Division I Round of 32
1995–96	Syracuse	29–9	12–6	2nd (BE 7)	NCAA Division I Runner-up
1996–97	Syracuse	19–13	9–9	T–4th (BE 7)	NIT Round of 64
1997–98	Syracuse	26–9	12–6	1st (BE 7)	NCAA Division I Sweet 16
1998–99	Syracuse	21–12	10–8	T–4th	NCAA Division I Round of 64
1999–00	Syracuse	26–6	13–3	T–1st	NCAA Division I Sweet 16
2000–01	Syracuse	25–9	10–6	T–2nd (West)	NCAA Division I Round of 32
2001–02	Syracuse	23–13	9–7	T–3rd (West)	NIT Fourth Place
2002–03	Syracuse	30–5	13–3	T–1st (West)	NCAA Division I champion
2003–04	Syracuse	23–8	11–5	T–3rd	NCAA Division I Sweet 16
2004–05	Syracuse	27–7*	11–5*	*	NCAA Division I Round of 64*
2005–06	Syracuse	23–12*	7–9*	*	NCAA Division I Round of 64*
2006–07	Syracuse	24–11*	10–6*	*	NIT Quarterfinal*
2007–08	Syracuse	21–14	9–9	T–8th	NIT Quarterfinal
2008–09	Syracuse	28–10	11–7	6th	NCAA Division I Sweet 16
2009–10	Syracuse	30–5	15–3	1st	NCAA Division I Sweet 16
2010–11	Syracuse	27–8*	12–6*	*	NCAA Division I Round of 32*
2011–12	Syracuse	34–3*	17–1*	*	NCAA Division I Elite Eight*
2012–13	Syracuse	30–10	11–7	5th	NCAA Division I Final Four
Syracuse Orange (Atlantic Coast Conference) (2013–2023)
2013–14	Syracuse	28–6	14–4	2nd	NCAA Division I Round of 32
2014–15	Syracuse	18–13	9–9	8th	Ineligible
2015–16	Syracuse	19–9**	9–6**	T–9th	NCAA Division I Final Four
2016–17	Syracuse	19–15	10–8	T–7th	NIT Second Round
2017–18	Syracuse	23–14	8–10	T–10th	NCAA Division I Sweet 16
2018–19	Syracuse	20–14	10–8	T-7th	NCAA Division I Round of 64
2019–20	Syracuse	18–14	10–10	T-6th	Postseason not held
2020–21	Syracuse	18–10	9–7	8th	NCAA Division I Sweet 16
2021–22	Syracuse	16–17	9–11	9th	
2022–23	Syracuse	17–15	10–10	T–8th	
Syracuse:		1,015*–441 (.697)***	432–275 (.611)		
Total:		1,015*–441 (.697)***			
National champion Postseason invitational champion Conference regular season champion Conference regular season and conference tournament champion Division regular season champion Division regular season and conference tournament champion Conference tournament champion

^{†} - From 1975 to 1982, the Eastern College Athletic Conference (ECAC) organized annual regional end-of-season men's basketball tournaments for independent Division I ECAC member colleges and universities in the Northeastern United States. The winner of each regional tournament was declared the ECAC regional champion for the season and received an automatic bid in the NCAA Division I men's basketball tournament.

* The NCAA vacated 15 wins from the 2004–05 season, 23 wins from the 2005–06 season, 22 wins from the 2006–07 season, 7 wins from the 2010–11 season, and 34 wins from the 2011–12 season as a result of the Syracuse athletics scandal.

** Boeheim was suspended for nine games during the 2015–16 season, during which Syracuse went 4–5 overall, and 0–3 in conference. So while the team's record was 23–14 overall, 9–9 in conference, Boeheim is credited with 19–9 overall, 9–6 in conference.

*** Boeheim's official NCAA record excludes the aforementioned 101 vacated wins as well as the games during his nine-game suspension in 2015–2016, however Syracuse claims all of its NCAA appearances and conference titles from those years.

== See also ==
- List of college men's basketball career coaching wins leaders
- List of NCAA Division I Men's Final Four appearances by coach
- Boeheim's Army
