= 1981 Big East men's basketball tournament =

- Classification: Division I
- Season: 1980–81
- Teams: 8
- Site: Carrier Dome; Syracuse, NY
- Champions: Syracuse (1st title)
- Winning coach: Jim Boeheim (1st title)
- MVP: Leo Rautins (Syracuse)

1980–81 Big East men's basketball standings
	Conf.				Overall
Team	W		L	PCT	W		L	PCT
Boston College	10	–	4	.714	23	–	7	.767
Georgetown	9	–	5	.643	20	–	12	.625
St. John's	8	–	6	.571	17	–	11	.607
Villanova	8	–	6	.571	20	–	11	.645
Connecticut	8	–	6	.571	20	–	9	.690
Syracuse †	6	–	8	.429	22	–	12	.647
Seton Hall	4	–	10	.286	11	–	16	.407
Providence	3	–	11	.214	10	–	18	.357
† 1981 Big East tournament winner Rankings from AP poll

The 1981 Big East men's basketball tournament took place at the Carrier Dome in Syracuse, NY. It was a single-elimination tournament with three rounds. Boston College had the best regular season conference record and received the #1 seed.

Syracuse defeated Villanova in the championship game by a score of 83–80 in triple overtime.

== Bracket ==
Quarterfinals
1	Boston College	65
8	Providence	67
4	Villanova	65
5	Connecticut	54
2	Georgetown	58
7	Seton Hall	52
3	St. John's	66
6	Syracuse	71

Semifinals
8	Providence	49
4	Villanova	58^{OT}
2	Georgetown	53
6	Syracuse	67

Championship Game
4	Villanova	80
6	Syracuse	83^{3OT}

== Awards ==
Most Valuable Player: Leo Rautins, Syracuse

All Tournament Team

- Alex Bradley, Villanova
- Tony Bruin, Syracuse
- Eric Floyd, Georgetown
- John Pinone, Villanova
- Leo Rautins, Syracuse
- Erich Santifer, Syracuse
