= Syracuse University athletics scandal =

Violations of NCAA rules

The Syracuse University athletics scandal involved violations of National Collegiate Athletic Association (NCAA) rules by the Syracuse University men's basketball and football programs.

== Investigation ==
The NCAA's investigation into violations by Syracuse athletics date back to May 2007, following an initial report by the university to the NCAA, after the university learned that local YMCA employees paid some football and men's basketball student-athletes; Syracuse claims the NCAA’s investigation of Syracuse has taken longer than any other investigation in NCAA history. On October 27, 2010, Syracuse formally submitted a written report detailing actual and potential NCAA violations to the NCAA, who in turn sent Syracuse a written notice of inquiry on December 2, 2010.

== Initial media reports ==
Prior to the NCAA's March 2015 infractions report, Syracuse and national media began reporting on potential rules violations by Syracuse athletics.

Yahoo! Sports reported on March 5, 2012, that Syracuse often failed to follow its own internal drug policy.

On March 20, 2013, CBS Sports and the Syracuse Post-Standard reported that the NCAA was investigating Syracuse in issues that CBS called "both major and wide-ranging in nature".

Brett McMurphy of ESPN revealed on October 24, 2014, that Syracuse had a hearing with the NCAA Committee on Infractions in Indianapolis scheduled for the next two days.

As the NCAA continued its investigation, The Post-Standard continued to reveal new areas of investigation. On November 17, 2014, the newspaper reported that the NCAA was investigating possible improper benefits offered by the YMCA of Oneida, New York to Syracuse student-athletes, including falsified internship hours for credit in the child and family services major.

== Findings ==
The NCAA found that men's basketball coach Jim Boeheim failed to promote compliance of NCAA rules within his program for nearly a decade.

=== Eligibility of Fab Melo ===
In the summer of 2012, Syracuse learned that men's basketball player Fab Melo (identified in the infractions report as "student-athlete 7") received improper assistance on coursework. After Melo was suspended for academic ineligibility in January 2012, Athletic Director Daryl Gross and the Syracuse University Provost office held a meeting with other academics and athletics officials to determine if in fact university and NCAA rules permitted a pathway to reinstate Melo. The Committee on Infractions agreed that the meeting was appropriate and the path proposed at the meeting, was a procedure that “if carried out appropriately by [the student-athlete] would have restored his eligibility within institutional and NCAA requirements”. Ultimately, it was decided that Melo would be allowed to re-submit a paper from a class taken two semesters prior to raise his grade for eligibility. Melo initially submitted his own work on January 27, 2012, but his professor considered Melo's work "inadequate"; within a few hours, Melo re-submitted his assignment and received sufficient credit to raise his grade in the class from a C+ to a B−. On January 30, two days before Melo was cleared to play basketball again, the Syracuse University College of Arts and Sciences questioned the grade change. The NCAA and university also investigated the circumstances behind Melo regaining eligibility and found that based on file metadata, staffers on the men's basketball team completed Melo's assignment.

=== Oneida YMCA ===
The NCAA found that the YMCA of Oneida, New York provided improper benefits to student-athletes and coaches. Jeff Cornish, the youth sports coordinator at the Oneida YMCA from 1996 to 2006, used a checking account to pay over $8,000 to three football and two basketball student-athletes in 14 months. Also, Oneida YMCA CEO Hank Leo hired three football players as interns for academic credit but falsified certifications that the student-athletes met their service requirements for said credit. The improper benefits were not restricted to student-athletes: The NCAA found that the YMCA gave an assistant coach a free gym membership, paid two trainers to volunteer at basketball clinics, and subsidized the rental payment for an administrative assistant.

== Penalties ==
Prior to the NCAA's final infractions report, Syracuse self-imposed a one-year postseason ban on February 4, 2015.

In March 2015, the NCAA released its infractions report which found that Syracuse had possibly violated rules. As a result, 101 wins were vacated by the NCAA from 2004–05, 2006–07 and from 2010–11, 2011-12 seasons. However, the NCAA confirmed that sanctions did not include the removal of any trophies or banners.

As a result, Syracuse can keep the banner for its 2012 team's run to the NCAA Elite 8 and 2011 advancement to the third round of the NCAA tournament. Also, a Big East Conference official confirmed that the conference's updated media guide continues to list Syracuse as its 2005 and 2006 tournament champion.

This reduced the number of Boeheim's career wins at the time from 966 to 858 and dropped Boeheim from second to sixth in all-time wins. Previous to the NCAA decision, Syracuse voluntarily vacated 24 men's basketball wins: 15 from the 2004–05 season and 9 from the 2011–12 season.

Following an appeal by Syracuse University, the NCAA reduced its scholarship reduction for Syracuse over the seasons from 2015–16 to 2018–19 from 12 to 8.

Syracuse voluntarily vacated all 11 wins from the 2004 to 2006 football seasons, and the NCAA placed Syracuse football on probation until 2020.
