= Wayne McKoy =

American basketball player (1958–2026)

Personal information
- Born: March 26, 1958 Elizabethtown, North Carolina, U.S.
- Died: August 18, 2026 (aged 68)
- Listed height: 6 ft 9 in (2.06 m)
- Listed weight: 235 lb (107 kg)

Career information
- High school: Long Island Lutheran (Brookville, New York)
- College: St. John's (1977–1981)
- NBA draft: 1981: 3rd round, 63rd overall pick
- Drafted by: New York Knicks
- Playing career: 1981–1984
- Position: Center

Career history
- 1981–1983: CB Estudiantes
- 1983–1984: CD Cajamadrid

Career highlights
- Second-team All-Big East (1980); Third-team All-Big East (1981); McDonald's All-American (1977); First-team Parade All-American (1977); Second-team Parade All-American (1976); Third-team Parade All-American (1975)
- Stats at Basketball Reference

Wayne McKoy (March 26, 1958 – August 18, 2026) was an American professional basketball player. He was a highly recruited high school player during his career at Long Island Lutheran in Brookville, New York, and earned comparisons to Kareem Abdul-Jabbar. McKoy played college basketball for the St. John's Redmen from 1977 to 1981 and was a two-time All-Big East Conference selection. He was drafted by his hometown New York Knicks but never played in the National Basketball Association (NBA) and instead spent his three-year professional career in Spain.

== Early life ==
McKoy was born in Elizabethtown, North Carolina on March 26, 1958. He did not know his birth father, and his birth mother abandoned him as an infant to her sister, Beatrice Wooten. McKoy moved with the Wooten family to Queens, New York, as a four-year-old. He was bullied as a child due to his height; he stood 6 ft 4 in (1.93 m) by the time he was in fifth grade.

Long Island Lutheran High School basketball coach Reverend Edward Visscher spotted McKoy during a church athletic dinner at Redeemer Lutheran Church in Queens. Visscher asked Redeemer pastor, Ernie Pflug, what high school McKoy attended and was informed he was still in the fifth grade; Visscher told McKoy to remember him.

== High school career ==
McKoy enrolled at Long Island Lutheran in Brookville, New York, under the advice of Pflug and Visscher. Standing 6 ft 8 in (2.03 m) as a 14-year-old, he received his first college recruitment letter before he had played on the varsity team. When he began to receive attention from National Basketball Association (NBA) scouts during his junior season, McKoy was considered to have the potential to enter the NBA draft without attending college and he became complacent with his schoolwork. After a series of tough games at the conclusion of his junior season that made McKoy doubt his preparedness for a professional career, McKoy requested a suspension from the Long Island Lutheran basketball team so he could concentrate on improving his schoolwork to enter college. McKoy and four other teammates with grade problems ultimately missed the final four games of the season. Cecil Watkins, who was the director of Elmhurst-Corona Youth Services and McKoy's closest advisor, believed that McKoy had also become disenchanted with basketball and his national fame.

He spent the offseason working for Watkins and returned to high school with a newfound desire to attend college. He had improved his limited reading ability to above-grade level and his maturation impressed college scouts. McKoy returned to the basketball team during his senior year and led the Long Island Lutheran team to a 17–1 record in the regular season. He was selected to play in the 1977 McDonald's All-American Game.

McKoy averaged 24.9 points and 13.2 rebounds per game during his high school career. In 1977, he set a Long Island high school scoring record with 70 points during a game against Our Saviour Lutheran School. McKoy was considered to be the best New York high school player since Kareem Abdul-Jabbar. With the expectation that he could single-handedly make a team successful, McKoy was one of the most sought-after high school players in the nation and received correspondence from 300 colleges.

== College career ==
McKoy committed to play for the Redmen of St. John's University which was the major college closest to his home in Bayside, Queens. McKoy had been concerned about news of players transferring from the NC State Wolfpack – his other option – and the ability of his mother to attend his games, who did not like to fly. McKoy admired head coach Lou Carnesecca and would team up with close friend and former high school teammate Reggie Carter, who had transferred from the Hawaii Rainbow Warriors to play for the Redmen that season.

Carnesecca said of McKoy after his recruitment: "He's not going to change the world—yet." McKoy had difficulty living up to his expectations and experienced frequent foul trouble during his freshman season. During his sophomore season, McKoy led the Redmen in rebounds per game with 7.7 and ranked second in scoring with 14.9 points per game. During the Eastern Regional final of the 1979 NCAA Division I Basketball Tournament against the Rutgers Scarlet Knights, McKoy banked in a rebound with five seconds remaining to win the game for the Redmen. The Redmen missed making the Final Four by just two points when they lost to the Penn Quakers the following game.

He was named team co-captain alongside Frank Gilroy for his senior season in 1980–81. He received tutoring from Willis Reed, who had joined the Redmen coaching staff as an unpaid volunteer assistant for the season. McKoy struggled as a senior and was "a model of inconsistency." He was the subject of jeers from fans during his final college game: a first-round loss to the Alabama Crimson Tide during the 1981 National Invitation Tournament in which he played tentatively. When McKoy had a shot blocked before it left his hands, the fans yelled, "Willis, you're overpaid!"

In Redmen (now Red Storm) program history, McKoy ranks 13th in points with 1,536, 9th in rebounds with 824, and 4th in blocks with 164. He was named to the All-Big East Conference team twice: on the second-team in 1980 and the third-team in 1981.

== Professional career ==
McKoy was selected by his hometown New York Knicks as the 63rd overall pick of the 1981 NBA draft. The Knicks believed that McKoy was not ready for the NBA after an underwhelming performance in the Southern California League. McKoy believed his reason for not making the NBA was that he was an undersized center and could not convert to playing forward.

He signed with CB Estudiantes of the Spanish Liga Española de Baloncesto. He had been recommended by Carnesecca to play in Spain and he ultimately accepted the only offer he received in the country. McKoy played for Estudiantes for two seasons and then signed with CD Cajamadrid of the Liga ACB. He averaged 16 points and 7 rebounds per game in his one season with Cajamadrid.

== Death ==
McKoy died on August 18, 2026, at the age of 68.
