= John Pinone =

American basketball player (born 1961)

Personal information
- Born: February 19, 1961 (age 65) Hartford, Connecticut, U.S.
- Listed height: 6 ft 8 in (2.03 m)
- Listed weight: 230 lb (104 kg)

Career information
- High school: South Catholic (Hartford, Connecticut)
- College: Villanova (1979–1983)
- NBA draft: 1983: 3rd round, 58th overall pick
- Drafted by: Atlanta Hawks
- Playing career: 1983–1993
- Position: Power forward
- Number: 33

Career history
- 1983: Atlanta Hawks
- 1983–1984: Ohio Mixers
- 1984–1993: Estudiantes

Career highlights
- Spanish King's Cup winner (1992); Spanish King's Cup MVP (1992); Spanish Prince's Cup winner (1986); No. 45 retired by Villanova Wildcats; Third-team All-American – AP, UPI (1983); 3× First-team All-Big East (1981–1983); 3× Robert V. Geasey Trophy winner (1981–1983)
- Stats at NBA.com
- Stats at Basketball Reference

John Gabriel Pinone Jr. (born February 19, 1961) is an American former professional basketball player.

== High school ==
Pinone played competitively at South Catholic High School in Hartford, leading the team to the Class L state championship in 1977 and 1979. Early in the 1978–79 season, Pinone and South Catholic defeated Middletown, ending their 80-game winning streak, longest in state history.

== College career ==
Pinone played collegiate basketball for Villanova's Wildcats from 1979 to 1983. He was named a third-team All-American as a senior. Pinone earned first-team All-Big East Conference honors three times, and was a first-team All-Philadelphia Big 5 selection four times. Pinone was the only freshman in Villanova history to lead the team in scoring, and Villanova retired his number 45 in 1995.

== Playing career ==
=== Clubs ===
A third-round draftee in 1983, Pinone played seven games in the National Basketball Association (NBA) for the Atlanta Hawks in the 1983–84 season. After spending the rest of the season in the Ohio Mixers, of the CBA, and earning a place in the 1984 CBA All-Star Game; he joined Estudiantes of the Spanish Liga ACB in the 1984–85 season, and played there through the 1992–93 season.

He won the Spanish Cup in the 1991–92 season, and contributed to Estudiantes reaching the 1992 EuroLeague Final Four. In his Liga ACB tenure with Estudiantes, Pinone played 12,306 minutes, played in 332 games, scored 6,175 points, secured 2,193 rebounds, and averaged 18.6 points per game. He was selected for the ACB All-Star Game in 1989 and 1991. During the nine seasons he played with Estudiantes, Pinone left a memorable mark in the history of the club, because of his solid team basketball playing style, and his competitive character.

=== National team ===
Pinone played for the US national team in the 1982 FIBA World Championship, where he won the silver medal.

== Coaching career ==
Pinone later became the Cromwell High School boys' basketball team coach, and coached them to state championships in the 2009, 2018, and 2023 seasons.

== Personal life ==
Pinone pleaded guilty, in October 2010, to a misdemeanor of filing a false tax return, and in December 2010, he was sentenced to six months of home confinement, six months probation, and a $10,000 fine.

== Career statistics ==
Legend
GP	Games played	GS	Games started	MPG	Minutes per game
FG%	Field goal percentage	3P%	3-point field goal percentage	FT%	Free throw percentage
RPG	Rebounds per game	APG	Assists per game	SPG	Steals per game
BPG	Blocks per game	PPG	Points per game	**Bold**	Career high

=== NBA ===
==== Regular season ====
Year	Team	GP	GS	MPG	FG%	3P%	FT%	RPG	APG	SPG	BPG	PPG
1983–84	Atlanta	7	0	9.3	.538	–	.600	1.4	.4	.3	.1	2.9
