= 1981 National Invitation Tournament =

Annual NCAA college basketball competition

- Season: 1980–81
- Teams: 32
- Finals site: Madison Square Garden, New York City
- Champions: Tulsa Golden Hurricane (1st title)
- Runner-up: Syracuse Orange (1st title game)
- Semifinalists: Purdue Boilermakers (3rd semifinal); West Virginia Mountaineers (4th semifinal)
- Winning coach: Nolan Richardson (1st title)
- MVP: Greg Stewart (Tulsa)

The 1981 National Invitation Tournament was the 1981 edition of the annual NCAA college basketball competition.

== Selected teams ==
Below is a list of the 32 teams selected for the tournament.

- Alabama
- American
- Clemson
- Connecticut
- Dayton
- Drake
- Duke
- Duquesne
- Fordham
- Georgia
- Holy Cross
- Marquette
- Michigan
- Minnesota
- North Carolina A&T
- Old Dominion
- Pan American
- Penn
- Purdue
- Rhode Island
- St. John's
- San Jose State
- South Alabama
- South Florida
- Southern Miss
- Syracuse
- Temple
- Texas–Arlington
- Toledo
- Tulsa
- UTEP
- West Virginia

== Bracket ==
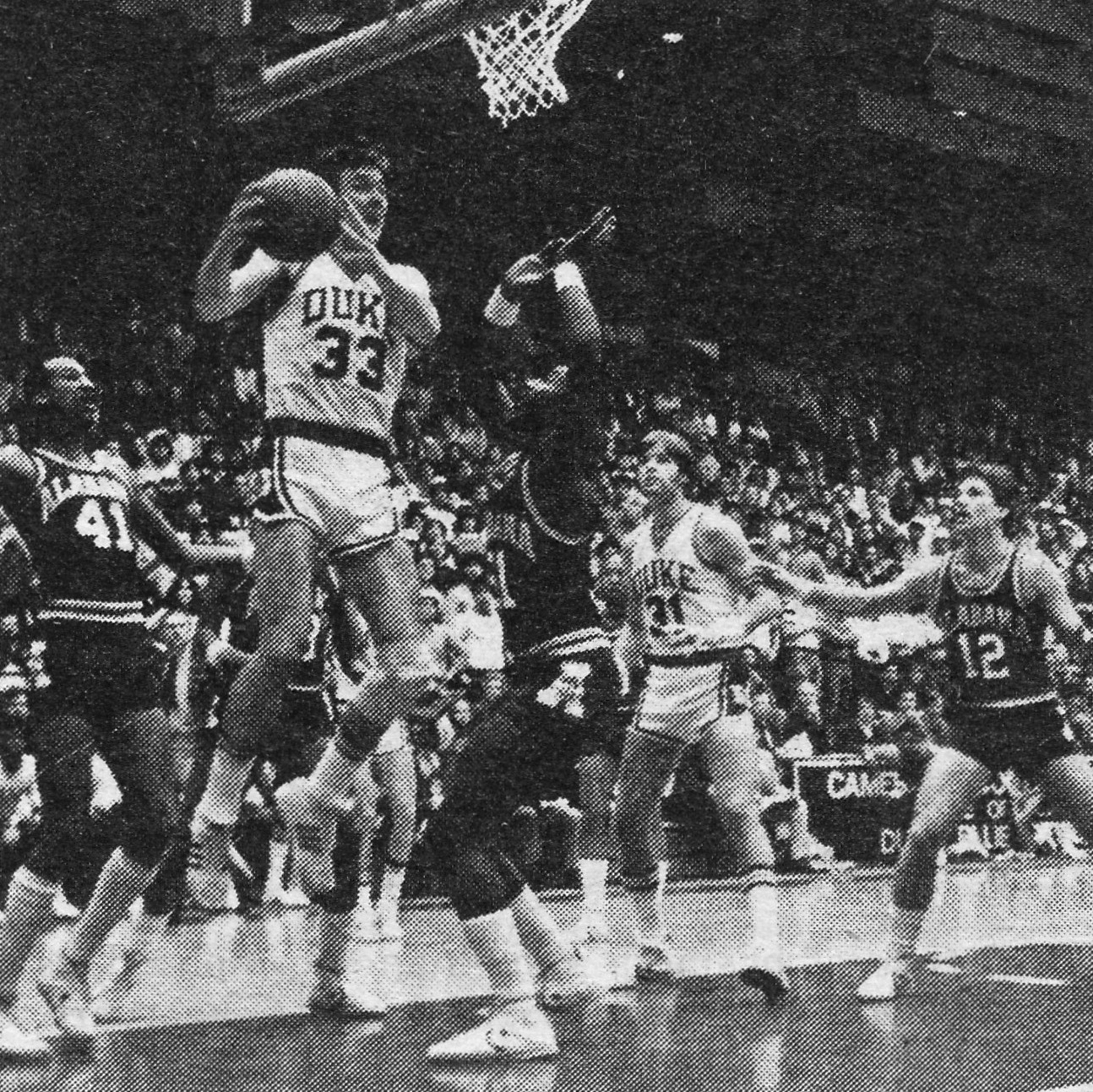
Duke's Kenny Dennard surrounded by Alabama players in a Second Round game.

Below are the four first round brackets, along with the four-team championship bracket.

First Round
Syracuse	88
Marquette	81
Holy Cross	56
Southern Miss	54
Michigan	74
Duquesne	58
Toledo	91
American	83

Second Round
Syracuse	77
Holy Cross	57
Michigan	80
Toledo	68

Quarterfinals
Syracuse	91
Michigan	76

First Round
Purdue	84
Rhode Island	58
Dayton	66
Fordham	65
Duke	79
North Carolina A&T	69
Alabama	73
St. John's	69

Second Round
Purdue	50
Dayton	46
Duke	75
Alabama	70

Quarterfinals
Purdue	81
Duke	69

First Round
Connecticut	65
South Florida	55
Minnesota	90
Drake	77
West Virginia	67
Penn	64
Temple	90
Clemson	82

Second Round
Connecticut	66
Minnesota	84
West Virginia	77
Temple	76

Quarterfinals
Minnesota	69
West Virginia	80

First Round
Tulsa	81
Pan American	71
UTEP	57
San Jose State	53
Georgia	74
Old Dominion	60
South Alabama	74
Texas–Arlington	71

Second Round
Tulsa	76
UTEP	72
Georgia	72
South Alabama	73

Quarterfinals
Tulsa	69
South Alabama	68

=== Semifinals & finals ===
Semifinals
Syracuse	70
Purdue	63
West Virginia	87
Tulsa	89

Final
Syracuse	84
Tulsa	86

Third place game
Purdue	75
West Virginia	72

== See also ==
- 1981 NCAA Division I basketball tournament
- 1981 NCAA Division II basketball tournament
- 1981 NCAA Division III basketball tournament
- 1981 NAIA Division I men's basketball tournament
- 1981 NAIA Division I women's basketball tournament
- 1981 National Women's Invitational Tournament
