= McDonough Gymnasium =

Arena on Georgetown University campus

McDonough Memorial Gymnasium
- "McDonough Arena"
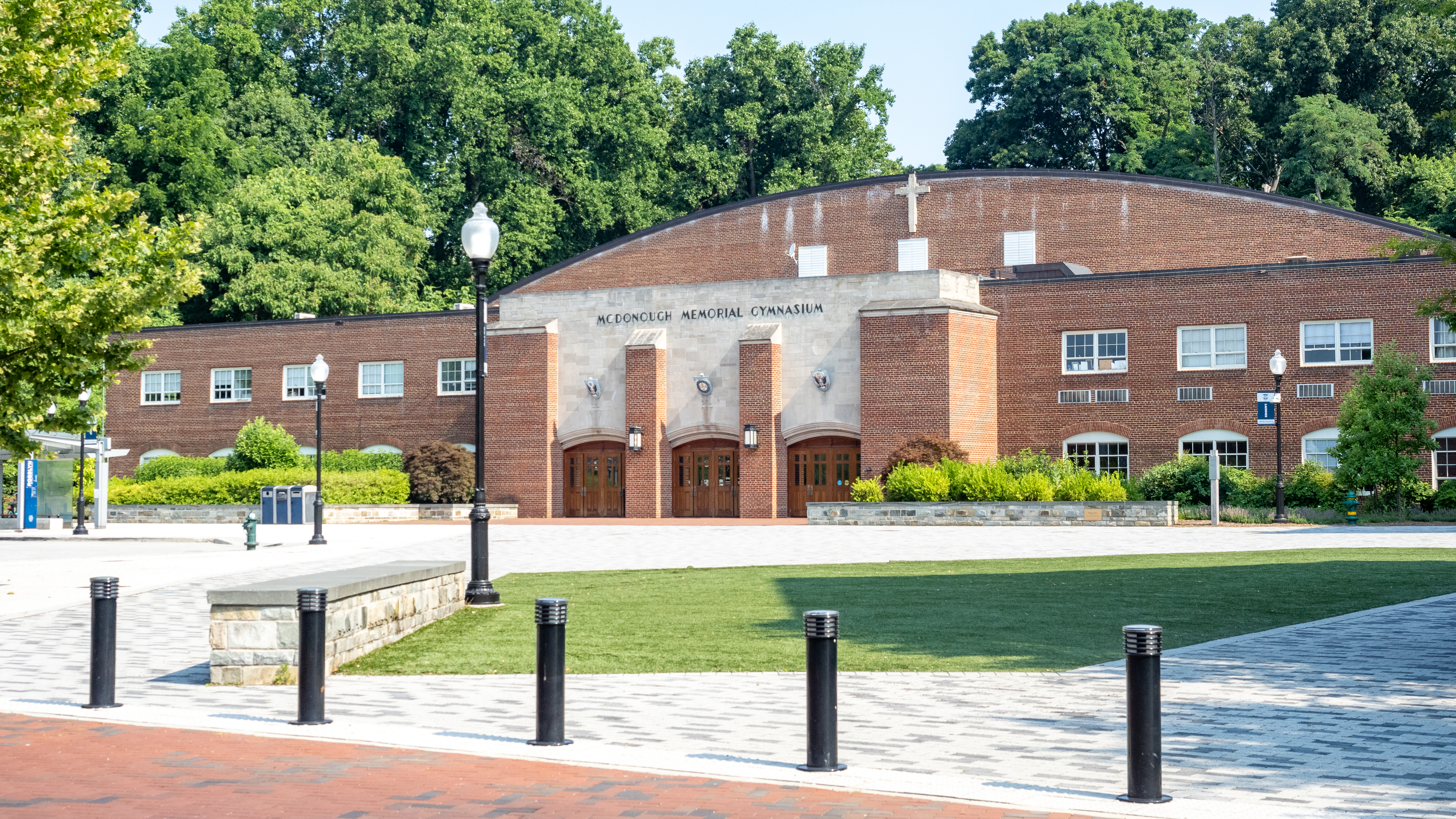
- McDonough Gymnasium in June 2024.

- McDonough Gymnasium′s location in Washington, D.C.
- Full name: McDonough Memorial Gymnasium
- Address: Georgetown University Washington, D.C. 20057
- Coordinates: 38°54′27″N 77°04′39″W
- Owner: Georgetown University
- Operator: Georgetown University
- Capacity: 2,200

Construction
- Groundbreaking: May 20, 1950
- Opened: December 8, 1951
- Cost: $250,000

Tenants
- Georgetown Hoyas men's basketball (NCAA) (1951–1981, 2020–2021, and occasional games since 1982); Georgetown Hoyas women's basketball Georgetown Hoyas women's volleyball James "Jabbo" Kenner League (1982–2019, 2022–2023)

McDonough Memorial Gymnasium, sometimes referred to as McDonough Arena when hosting a sports or entertainment event, is a multi-purpose arena on the campus of Georgetown University in Washington, D.C. The gymnasium opened in 1951 and can hold 2,200 spectators for sports events.

One source claims that "McDonough Gymnasium" refers to the building as a whole, while "McDonough Arena" refers only to the event space within the building where athletic and social events take place.

== Naming and construction ==
The building, first proposed in 1927, is named for Rev. Vincent J. McDonough, S.J., Georgetown's athletic director from 1916 to 1928. Legend has it that three days before his death on September 3, 1939, he was asked what he wanted for the 25th anniversary of his priesthood, to which he replied, "You give the boys a new gym and I'll be happy." Though he did not live to see it, ground was broken for construction of the new gymnasium on May 20, 1950, the cornerstone was laid on October 14, 1950, and the official ribbon-cutting and opening was held December 8, 1951. When it opened, McDonough Gymnasium's capacity was 3,500 to 4,000 for basketball and 5,500 for general events. Its seating capacity for events has varied greatly over the years. Air conditioning was installed in the building in 1988.

== Men's basketball ==
=== Georgetown Hoyas ===
Before McDonough opened, the Georgetown Hoyas men's basketball team had played its home games in an on-campus facility only from the 1914-15 season through the 1926-27 season, when the Hoyas played at Ryan Gymnasium. McDonough's opening allowed the Georgetown men's team to move back on campus, and it was the home court of the Hoyas for 30 seasons, from 1951-52 through 1980-81. Play at McDonough began with a 57–50 loss to Fordham on December 7, 1951 – the day before McDonough's official opening – but the team went on to post an 11–1 home record in McDonough's inaugural season. The Hoyas had a .500 or better home record in 29 of their 30 seasons at McDonough.

McDonough hosted a semifinal game of the NCAA Division I men's basketball ECAC South Region tournament, organized by the Eastern College Athletic Conference (ECAC), in both 1977 and 1978.

To accommodate its growing fan base, the men's basketball team moved to the Capital Centre (later known as USAir Arena and later still as US Airways Arena) in Landover, Maryland, beginning with the 1981-1982 season, and early in the 1997-1998 season it moved again to the MCI Center, a new downtown Washington, D.C., arena later renamed the Verizon Center and now known as Capital One Arena. However, McDonough remained the team's practice facility until 2016, and since 1981 it on occasion has hosted Georgetown preseason and regular-season games, generally against less-well-known opponents; Big East Conference rules did not permit Georgetown to host conference games there because of the gymnasium's small capacity, and no regular-season games against well-known opponents have been held at McDonough since Georgetown played there against No. 4 Missouri in February 1982 and Big East rival Providence in January 1984. The only exceptions have been postseason games Georgetown hosted during appearances in the National Invitation Tournament (NIT); under NIT rules, schools in the tournament were required to play games on campus or at campus-owned facilities, and so the Hoyas hosted 1993 and 2005 NIT games at McDonough. A scheduling conflict at the Verizon Center, which already had booked the Ringling Brothers and Barnum & Bailey Circus on game day, forced Georgetown to host a 2014 NIT game at McDonough. McDonough also hosted a 2019 NIT game on an evening when Capital One Arena – as the Verizon Center had been renamed in August 2017 – was in use for a Washington Capitals National Hockey League game.

To comply with public health restrictions in Washington, D.C., during the COVID-19 pandemic, the team played all of its home games during the 2020-2021 season at McDonough, the first time it had done so since the 1980-1981 season. The season included Georgetown's first home opener at McDonough since the 2001-2002 season, and by the time the team had played its first six home games it already had played more games at McDonough during a single season than any time since 1980-1981. No fans were allowed at the games, and 500 cardboard cut-outs of fans and their pets were placed in the stands instead.

=== Kenner League ===
The James "Jabbo" Kenner League — officially known as "Nike Pro City Summer League-Washington" since 2007 — provides a National Collegiate Athletic Association (NCAA)-structured environment in which Washington, D.C.-area high school and college players gain experience. It also includes "senior" games between teams consisting of former Georgetown players, visiting National Basketball Association players, and legendary players from Washington, D.C.-area playgrounds. It was the only NCAA-sponsored summer basketball league in Washington, D.C., from 1982 to 2023. Although the Kenner League operates independently of Georgetown University, McDonough Gymnasium hosted the league every summer from the league's founding in 1982 though 2019. In 2020 and 2021, the ongoing COVID-19 pandemic forced the Kenner League′s cancellation, but it returned to McDonough in 2022 and 2023. Over 200 Georgetown players participated in the Kenner League during its first three decades, and they continued to play in the league through 2023, when the Kenner League described itself as having a "deep tradition with Georgetown." However, disputes over money and a fraying relationship between Georgetown and Nike Pro City led Nike Pro City to move the 2024 Kenner League competition to A. C. Jordan Arena at Bowie State University in Prince George's County, Maryland, and no Georgetown players took part in 2024.

=== John Thompson Jr. Court ===
In the wake of the death on August 30, 2020, of John Thompson Jr. — Georgetown's men's basketball head coach from 1972 to 1999 — Georgetown University paid tribute to him by naming the men's team's home court "John Thompson Jr. Court" during a ceremony at McDonough Gymnasium prior to the men's basketball team's season-opening game on November 25, 2020. Plans called for the men's team eventually to honor Thompson with a court-naming ceremony at Capital One Arena once COVID-19 pandemic-related public-health restrictions in Washington, D.C., loosened enough to permit the team to resume playing its home games there.

== Other uses ==
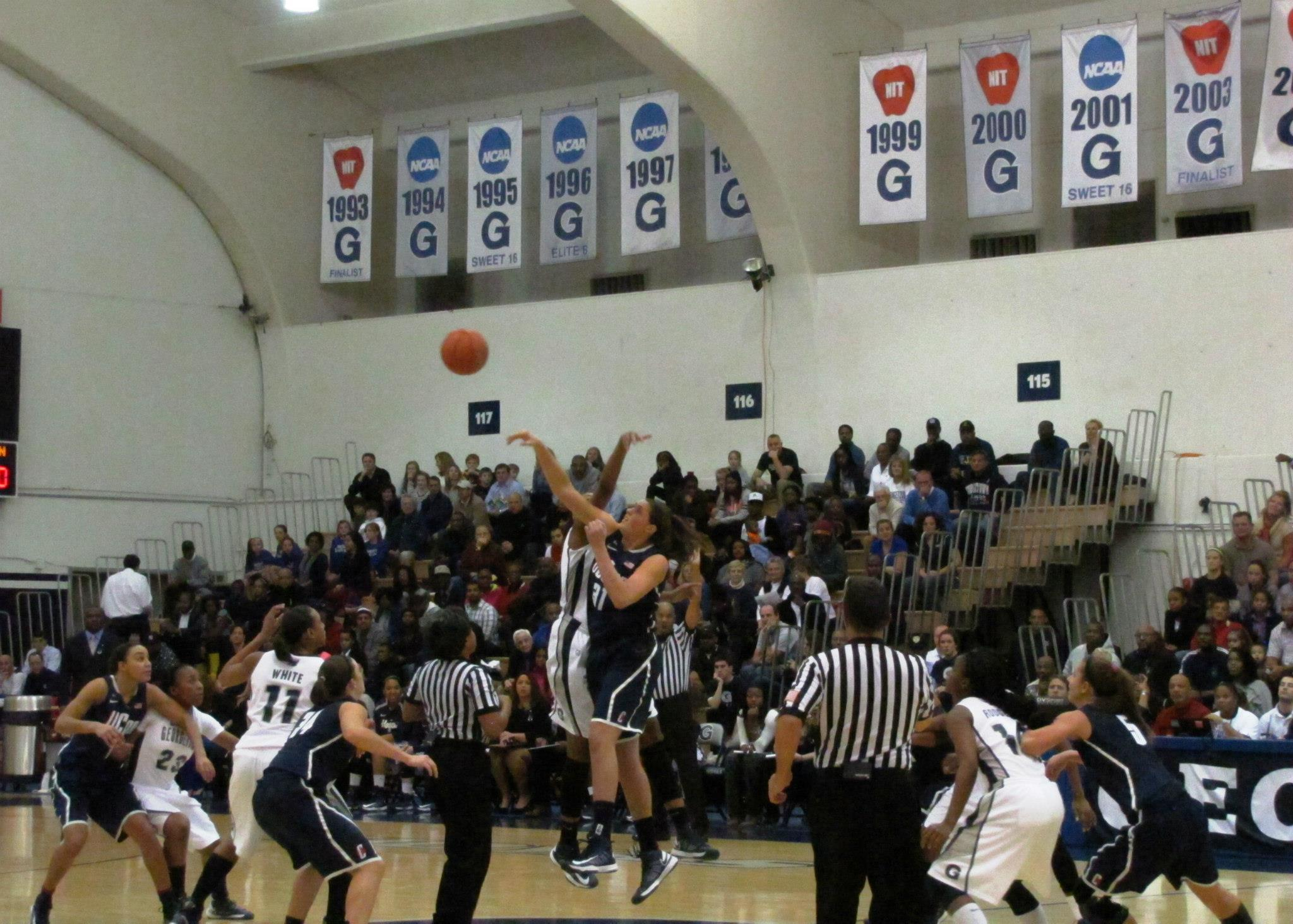
McDonough Gymnasium hosting the University of Connecticut Huskies in a women's basketball game against Georgetown on January 9, 2013

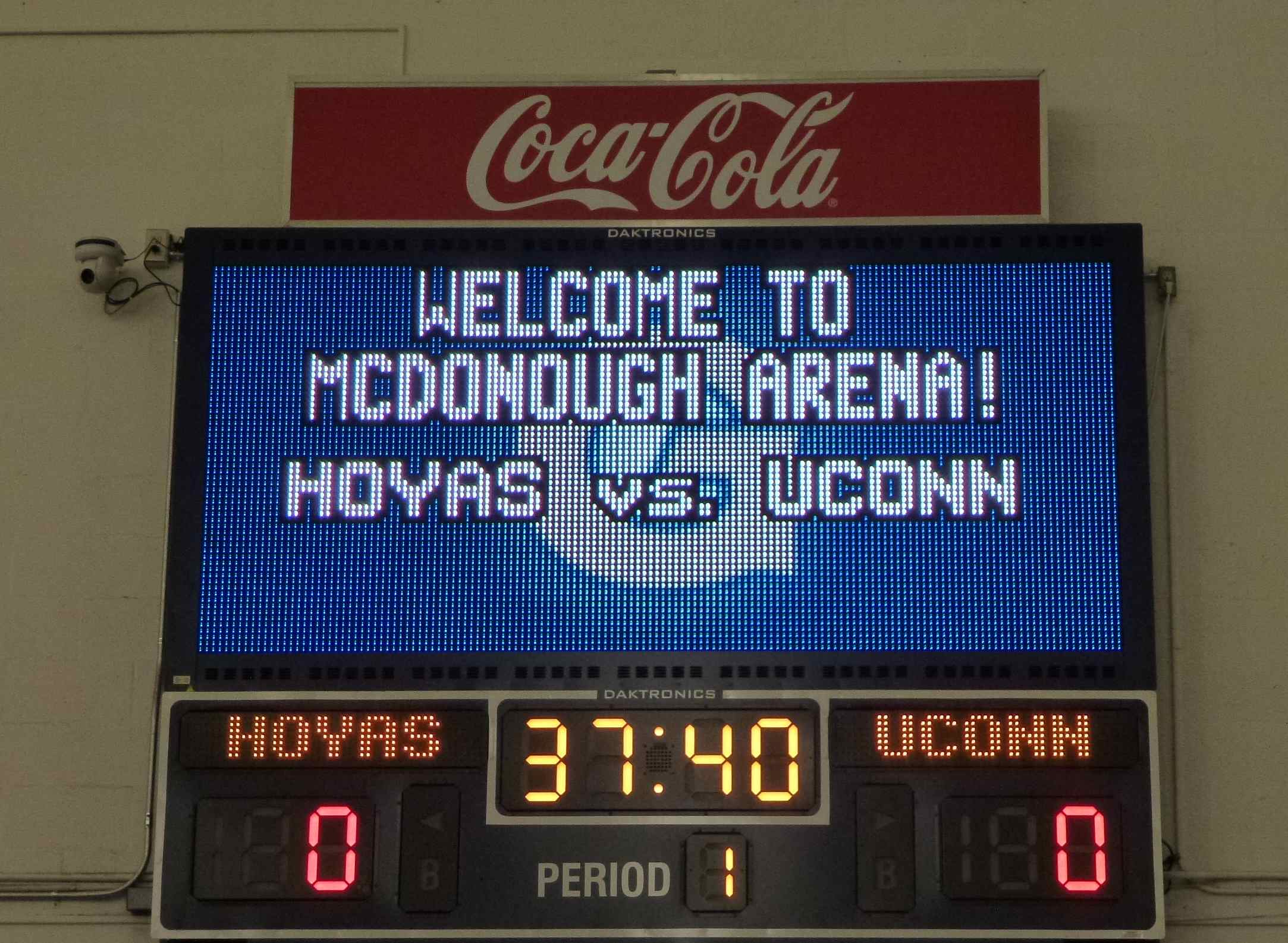
McDonough Gymnasium's scoreboard during the women's basketball game on January 9, 2013

When it opened in 1951, McDonough housed facilities for four intercollegiate teams, but it eventually served 29 of them. In addition to an occasional Georgetown Hoyas men's basketball game, McDonough Gymnasium continues to host Georgetown women's basketball and women's volleyball games.

Each year in mid-October, McDonough Gymnasium hosts Hoya Madness, a free event for Georgetown students and athletics donors which unofficially kicks off the upcoming college basketball season and introduces Georgetown's men's and women's basketball teams for that season. The event also includes performances by the Georgetown pep squad and band and by musical groups.

Many concerts have been held at McDonough Gymnasium, including shows by Count Basie, Chuck Berry, Ray Charles, Bruce Springsteen, The Who, and the Grateful Dead. It has also hosted the GE College Bowl, a professional tennis tournament, and protests against the Vietnam War. During its history, the building also has hosted a number of visiting foreign dignitaries, bishops, and academics, as well as graduation ceremonies.

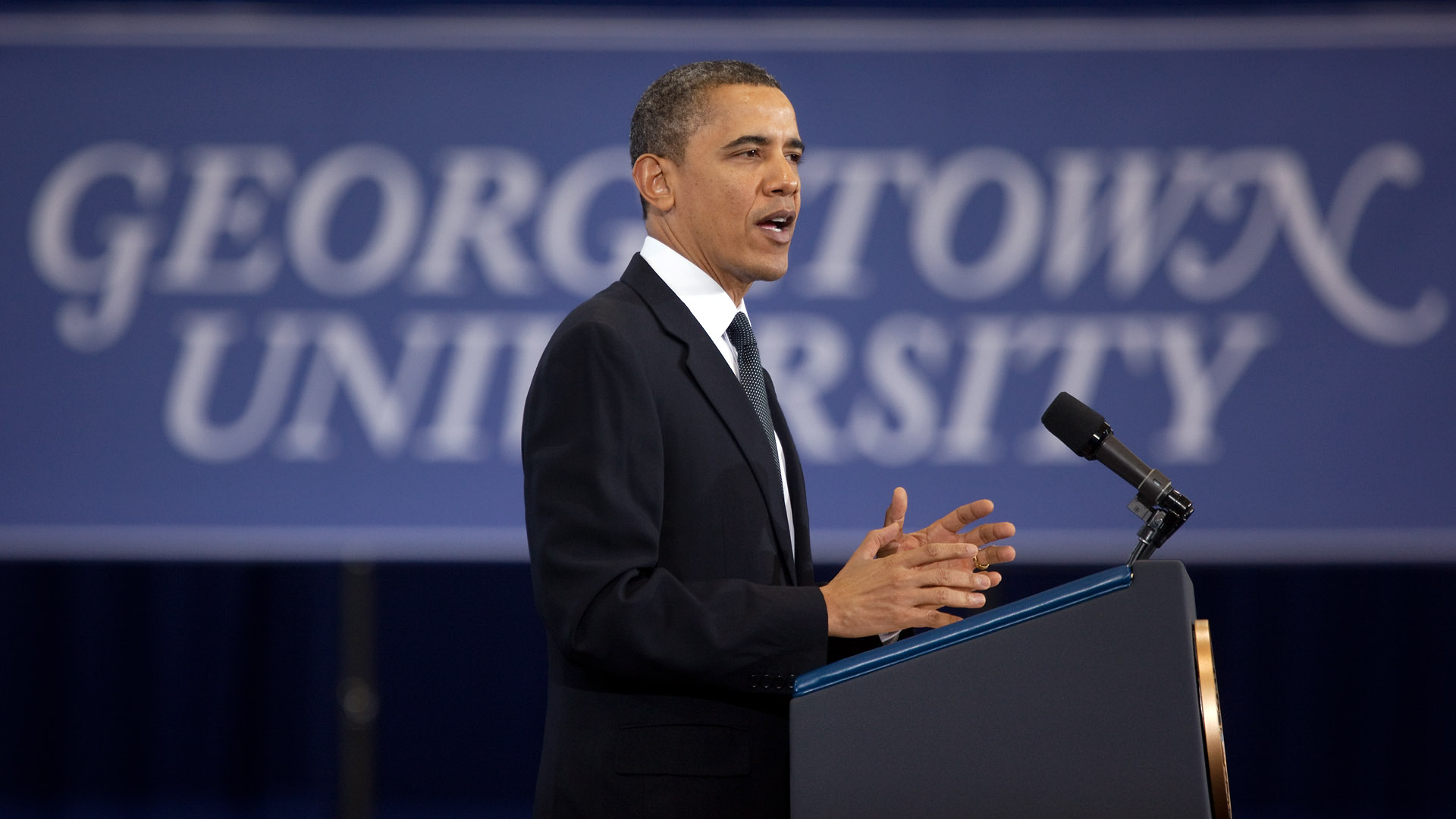
President Barack Obama speaks at McDonough Gymnasium on March 30, 2011.

McDonough Gymnasium was the site of one of President Dwight D. Eisenhower′s two inaugural balls in January 1953. In addition to Eisenhower, Presidents Richard Nixon and Bill Clinton visited McDonough Gymnasium, and on March 30, 2011, President Barack Obama gave a speech on U.S. energy security policy there.

McDonough Gymnasium hosts freshman convocation at the beginning of each academic year.

When it opened in 1951, McDonough Gymnasium had a stage for theatrical performances and housed coaches′ offices, weight rooms, a squash court, and the university's physical education and student health programs. In its early years, it also included dormitory rooms for students. Over the years, McDonough Gymnasium also has provided office space for the university's athletics administration offices and housed sports medicine and training room facilities and varsity locker rooms. Until Yates Field House opened in 1979, McDonough Gymnasium was the only facility for intramural sports on the Georgetown campus.

A portrait of the building's namesake, Rev. Vincent J. McDonough, hangs in McDonough Gymnasium's lobby, where dozens of Georgetown's national trophies and sports memorabilia, some dating as far back as the early 20th century, are on display.

== After opening of the Thompson Center ==
McDonough Gymnasium's aging practice and training facilities had long been considered overcrowded and obsolete when, on September 12, 2014, Georgetown held a groundbreaking ceremony for the four-story, 144,000-square-foot (13,378-square-meter) John R. Thompson Jr. Intercollegiate Athletics Center, whose northwest corner is adjacent to the southeast corner of McDonough. Construction of the new center began in November 2014. Officially opened with a ribbon-cutting ceremony on October 6, 2016 — the first new intercollegiate athletic facility constructed at Georgetown since McDonough — the Thompson Center serves all 29 of the university's varsity sports programs – providing them with locker rooms, practice courts, and other training facilities – and houses the offices of the men's and women's basketball programs.

The Thompson Center replaced McDonough as the university's primary athletic center, but McDonough Gymnasium remains in use. Physically connected to the Thompson Center, McDonough continues to house the administrative offices of the university's athletics department and the women's basketball and volleyball teams continue to play their home games there, as the men's basketball team occasionally does as well. McDonough Gymnasium continues to host various university and community special events and to serve as a venue in which Georgetown alumni, parents, and fans gather before and after Georgetown sporting events.

== Future plans ==
In 2000, Georgetown's athletic director unveiled a $22 million proposal to renovate McDonough Gymnasium, modernizing it to serve as a "convocation center" with an improved capability to host both athletic and social events, as well as provide an on-campus basketball venue that met the standards of the original Big East Conference. The proposal involved leaving the building's walls standing and avoiding any increase in its height, and digging down into McDonough's foundation to create a bowl-type basketball arena with a seating capacity of 6,000 to 7,000, with the basketball court rotated 90 degrees from its existing configuration, as well as the construction of a new practice facility adjacent to McDonough. The concept of a new practice center survived, resulting in the construction of the Thompson Center, but no work on McDonough itself took place. The university decided to prioritize other athletics projects in its plans between 2000 and 2010, and did not include the conversion of McDonough into a "convocation center" in its 2010–2020 plan for athletic facility improvements.

By February 2018, McDonough was the oldest gymnasium of its kind in Washington, D.C., and among the 20 oldest on-campus facilities in NCAA Division I. As of February 2018, however, Georgetown had no plans to renovate McDonough, and did not plan to construct any new indoor intercollegiate facilities through at least 2036.

== See also ==
- List of NCAA Division I basketball arenas
