= Roberts Center =

Now defunct multi-purpose arena

Coordinates: 42.3339°N 71.1670°W

Roberts Center was a 4,400-seat multi-purpose arena in Chestnut Hill, Massachusetts, United States. It opened in 1958 and was home to the Boston College Eagles men's basketball and women's basketball teams until the Conte Forum opened in 1988.
