= 1983 NCAA Division I men's basketball championship game =

NC State 54–52 Houston

1983 NCAA Tournament Championship Game
National championship game
NC State Wolfpack	Houston Cougars
ACC	SWC
(25–10)	(31–2)
54	52
Head coach: Jim Valvano	Head coach: Guy Lewis
- AP: 16
- Coaches: 14
- AP: 1
- Coaches: 1
	1st half	2nd half	Total
NC State Wolfpack	33	21	54
Houston Cougars	25	27	52
- Date: April 4, 1983
- Venue: The Pit, Albuquerque, New Mexico
- MVP: Hakeem Olajuwon, Houston
- Favorite: Houston by 7.5
- Referees: Hank Nichols, Paul Housman, Joe Forte
- Attendance: 17,327

United States TV coverage
- Network: CBS
- Announcers: Gary Bender (play-by-play); Billy Packer (color)

The 1983 NCAA Division I men's basketball championship game was the final game of the 1983 NCAA Division I men's basketball tournament. It determined the national champion for the 1982–83 NCAA Division I men's basketball season. The game was played on April 4, 1983, at The Pit in Albuquerque, New Mexico and paired top-ranked, #1 seed Midwest Regional Champions, the Houston Cougars, and sixteenth-ranked, #6 seed West Regional Champions, the NC State Wolfpack.

Hobbled by Clyde Drexler’s four first-half fouls, Houston trailed NC State at the end of the first half, 33–25. Houston opened the second half with a 17–2 run to seize a seven-point lead, 42–35. But NC State kept the game close, as Houston's star center Hakeem Olajuwon left the game multiple times to receive oxygen, leading the Cougars to slow the pace of the game in order to protect the lead. Tied at 52 with 44 seconds remaining, NC State held the ball for a final shot attempt. Houston's Benny Anders narrowly missed stealing the ball as the clock ticked down. After gathering the deflected ball nearly 30 feet from the basket, Dereck Whittenburg launched a desperation shot that fell short of the rim. Olajuwon hesitated in fear of a goaltending call, allowing Lorenzo Charles to catch the ball and dunk it for the 54–52 victory. One of the indelible images in tournament history is of winning coach Jim Valvano running onto the court after the game ended looking for Whittenburg.

NC State's postseason run and national championship win, highlighted by Charles' game-winning dunk, remain a well-known representation of the March Madness tournament.

== Participants ==
=== NC State Wolfpack ===
Despite a preseason ranking of #16 in the AP poll, the Wolfpack sputtered to a 9–7 record after losing at Maryland on January 29. Three close victories in the ACC Tournament saved NC State from missing the NCAA Tournament altogether. Three of the team's four victories on the road to the Final Four came by one or two points. The Wolfpack trailed with a minute or less to play in six of their eight postseason games before this game.

- West
  - (6) NC State 69, (11) Pepperdine 67
  - (6) NC State 71, (3) UNLV 70
  - (6) NC State 75, (10) Utah 56
  - (6) NC State 63, (1) Virginia 62
- Final Four
  - (W6) NC State 67, (E4) Georgia 60

=== Houston Cougars ===
Houston was ranked #14 in the AP poll to open the season, and fell to 5–2 after a 72–63 loss to #1 Virginia in Tokyo on December 16, 1982. The Cougars then ran off a 26-game winning streak, capturing the #1 ranking in the process, that was capped by a 94–81 victory over #2 Louisville to advance to the National Championship Game.

- Midwest
  - (1) Houston 60, (8) Maryland 50
  - (1) Houston 70, (4) Memphis 63
  - (1) Houston 89, (3) Villanova 71
- Final Four
  - (MW1) Houston 94, (ME1) Louisville 81

== Game summary ==
CBS

April 4

Box Score

#W6 NC State Wolfpack 54, #MW1 Houston Cougars 52
Scoring by half: 33–25, 21–27
Pts: Thurl Bailey 15; Rebs: Cozell McQueen 12; Asts: Sidney Lowe 8	Pts: Akeem Olajuwon 20; Rebs: Akeem Olajuwon 18; Asts: Alvin Franklin 3

The Pit - Albuquerque, New Mexico
Attendance: 17,327
Referees: Hank Nichols, Paul Housman, Joe Forte

NC State led at halftime by a score of 33–25. Houston was hampered by foul trouble that plagued star Clyde Drexler, who picked up three fouls early in the first half yet was begging to stay in the game. NC State sophomore guard Terry Gannon drew a controversial charging foul against Drexler to put him at four and leave him one foul away from disqualification; replays showed, and Drexler maintained later, that Gannon had appeared to grab Drexler's legs and pull him down with him and thus should have been called for a defensive foul.

In the second half, the Cougars came out with a second wind and established control of the game, eventually taking a seven-point lead at 52–45. Since the game was played in Albuquerque, players had to deal with the city's mile-high altitude. The Cougars' star center, Akeem Olajuwon, known as Akeem at the time, had problems adjusting to the environment and tired quickly, needing to check out of the game multiple times so he could put on an oxygen mask and recover. Houston head coach Guy Lewis decided that in order to protect the lead and Olajuwon's health at the same time, the Cougars would slow the game down and take as much time as they felt necessary on each possession; the NCAA did not introduce a shot clock until the 1985-86 season, which theoretically meant a team could keep possession for multiple minutes by simply passing the ball around.

North Carolina State, however, had been countering these situations throughout the postseason by stopping the clock with intentional fouls. Although their opponents could continue to score from the free throw line, the strategy enabled the Wolfpack to save time, gain more possessions, and extend the game. In this game, the strategy's effectiveness was increased as free throw shooting was one of the Cougars' deficiencies; as a team, they had only recorded a percentage of 60.9% from the line. The struggles continued in this game, as NC State was able to rally back and tie the score at 52.

On what would be the last Houston possession, Valvano called for his players to back off and let freshman guard Alvin Franklin bring the ball up the court and stand by while Houston passed the ball around before they committed their foul. Valvano's strategy was to foul Franklin once he got the ball back, and Whittenburg did exactly that with 1:05 left in regulation.

The move was largely psychological, according to Whittenburg. Since Franklin was the youngest player on the Houston squad, everyone on the NC State side felt he could not handle the pressure of the moment with a potential championship at stake. The theory proved correct as Franklin missed the free throw, and the Wolfpack grabbed the rebound.

Valvano called timeout with 44 seconds left and drew up a play. The Wolfpack would pass the ball around and take the clock down to ten seconds. Whoever had the ball at that point was to pass it to Whittenburg, who would then take the last shot.

Lewis, meanwhile, called for a half court trap defensive setup out of the timeout. This surprised the Wolfpack, as Houston had been running a man-to-man defense the entire game, and NC State had to resort to keep the ball moving so as not to lose possession. Senior forward Thurl Bailey ended up with possession of the basketball. Drawing a double team, he looked back toward Whittenburg, who was approximately thirty feet away from the hoop near midcourt. Bailey threw what Whittenburg would later call a "poor fundamental" overhanded pass which Houston's Benny Anders, guarding Whittenburg on the play, was in position to steal.

At this point, Whittenburg hearkened back to his high school days with Morgan Wootten at DeMatha Catholic High School, where he was taught to always catch the basketball with both hands. If Whittenburg had not attempted to do so in this case, Anders may have gotten the steal and a game-winning breakaway layup. In college basketball at the time, the game clock continued to run after a made field goal, and the Wolfpack likely would not have had time even to inbound the ball. As it was, Anders knocked the ball out of Whittenburg's hands, but Whittenburg quickly regained control.

The clock, meanwhile, had ticked down to five seconds and Whittenburg was still standing a significant distance from the goal. Once he regained control, Whittenburg turned and launched a desperation shot to try and win the game for NC State. The shot's trajectory took it to the front of the basket where Olajuwon was covering Wolfpack center Lorenzo Charles. As he watched the shot, Olajuwon said he knew the shot was going to come up short but he also did not want to go for the ball too early because of the potential for goaltending. Charles took advantage of the indecision by Olajuwon and went up for the air ball, then in one motion scored the go-ahead points with a two-handed tip-in dunk. The final two seconds ticked off the clock before Houston could inbound the ball, and with that the game ended and the Wolfpack were the national champions.

Despite the loss, Olajuwon was named Tournament MOP as he collected 41 points, 40 rebounds, and 15 blocked shots in the Final Four alone. To date, this remains the last time a player from the losing team was named Most Outstanding Player.

It was NC State's second NCAA championship. Their first championship was in 1974, when they defeated the Marquette Warriors. The Wolfpack became the first team to win the NCAA Tournament with at least 10 losses.

It also marked Drexler's final college game, as he entered the 1983 NBA draft with a year of eligibility remaining and was selected 14th overall by the Portland Trail Blazers. In 1995, he returned to Houston and rejoined Olajuwon after the defending champion Rockets traded Otis Thorpe to the Trail Blazers for him in the middle of the season, and he helped lead the Rockets to a second straight NBA championship.

Starters:			Pts	Reb	Ast
F	43	Lorenzo Charles	4	7	0
F	41	Thurl Bailey	15	5	0
G	35	Sidney Lowe	8	0	8
G	25	Dereck Whittenburg	14	5	1
C	45	Cozell McQueen	4	12	1
Reserves:					
G	24	Terry Gannon	7	1	2
F	33	Alvin Battle	2	1	1
G	31	Ernie Myers	0	1	0
Head coach:
Jim Valvano

NC State	Houston

NC State	Statistics	Houston
23/59 (39%)	Field goals	21/55 (38%)
8/11 (73%)	Free throws	10/19 (53%)
32	Total rebounds	43
13	Assists	9
6	Turnovers	13
7	Steals	0
2	Blocks	8
16	Fouls	16

Starters:			Pts	Reb	Ast
F	42	Michael Young	6	8	1
F/C	40	Larry Micheaux	4	6	0
G	22	Clyde Drexler	4	2	0
G	20	Alvin Franklin	4	0	3
C	34	Akeem Olajuwon	20	18	1
Reserves:					
G/F	44	Reid Gettys	4	2	2
G/F	32	Benny Anders	10	2	1
F	54	Bryan Williams	0	4	1
G	24	Dave Rose	0	1	0
Head coach:
Guy Lewis

== Broadcast call on the final shot ==
Packer: They've got to drive to the basket, it's down to seven seconds.
Bender: You can see the time. Whittenburg...oh that's a long ways. It's there!
Packer: OHHHHH! [overlapping Bender, voice breaking] They won it! [pause] On the dunk!

— CBS' Gary Bender and Billy Packer calling Charles' game-winning dunk
