= 1982–83 NC State Wolfpack men's basketball team =

American college basketball season

1982–83 NC State Wolfpack men's basketball

NCAA tournament National Champions ACC tournament champions

National Championship Game, W 54–52 vs. Houston
- Conference: Atlantic Coast Conference

Ranking
- Coaches: No. 14
- AP: No. 16
- Record: 26–10 (8–6 ACC)
- Head coach: Jim Valvano (3rd season)
- Assistant coaches: Tom Abatemarco (1st season); Ray Martin (3rd season); Ed McLean (1st season)
- Captains: Thurl Bailey; Sidney Lowe; Dereck Whittenburg
- Home arena: Reynolds Coliseum

1982–83 ACC men's basketball standings
	Conf.				Overall
Team	W		L	PCT	W		L	PCT
No. 8 North Carolina	12	–	2	.857	28	–	8	.778
No. 4 Virginia	12	–	2	.857	29	–	5	.853
Maryland	8	–	6	.571	20	–	10	.667
No. 16 NC State †	8	–	6	.571	26	–	10	.722
Wake Forest	7	–	7	.500	20	–	10	.667
Georgia Tech	4	–	10	.286	13	–	15	.464
Duke	3	–	11	.214	11	–	17	.393
Clemson	2	–	12	.143	11	–	20	.355
† 1983 ACC tournament winner Rankings from AP poll

The 1982–83 NC State Wolfpack men's basketball team represented North Carolina State University. The Wolfpack were a member of the Atlantic Coast Conference (ACC). The team went 26–10 on the year, winning the ACC tournament and the NCAA National Championship.

== Roster ==
1982–83 NC State Wolfpack men's basketball team
Players
Coaches

Pos.	#	Name	Height	Weight	Year	Hometown
F	41	Thurl Bailey	6 ft 11 in (2.11 m)	212 lb (96 kg)	Sr	Bladensburg, Maryland
F	33	Alvin Battle	6 ft 7 in (2.01 m)	225 lb (102 kg)	So	Rocky Mount, North Carolina
F	43	Lorenzo Charles	6 ft 7 in (2.01 m)	226 lb (103 kg)	So	Brooklyn, New York
F	40	Walt Densmore	6 ft 6 in (1.98 m)	195 lb (88 kg)	Fr	Tuscaloosa, Alabama
F	10	Tommy DiNardo (W)	6 ft 6 in (1.98 m)	194 lb (88 kg)	Jr	Jamesville, North Carolina
G	24	Terry Gannon	6 ft 0 in (1.83 m)	165 lb (75 kg)	So	Joliet, Illinois
F	34	Quinton Leonard	6 ft 8 in (2.03 m)	210 lb (95 kg)	Jr	Louisburg, North Carolina
G	35	Sidney Lowe	6 ft 0 in (1.83 m)	195 lb (88 kg)	Sr	Hyattsville, Maryland
G	12	George McClain	6 ft 0 in (1.83 m)	160 lb (73 kg)	So	Rocky Mount, North Carolina
C	45	Cozell McQueen	6 ft 11 in (2.11 m)	204 lb (93 kg)	So	Bennettsville, South Carolina
G	31	Ernie Myers	6 ft 4 in (1.93 m)	190 lb (86 kg)	Fr	Bronx, New York
F	15	Walter Proctor	6 ft 8 in (2.03 m)	212 lb (96 kg)	So	Somerset, New Jersey
F	30	Harold Thompson	6 ft 5 in (1.96 m)	212 lb (96 kg)	Fr	Raeford, North Carolina
F	42	Mike Warren	6 ft 7 in (2.01 m)	168 lb (76 kg)	So	Raleigh, North Carolina
G	25	Dereck Whittenburg	6 ft 1 in (1.85 m)	195 lb (88 kg)	Sr	Hyattsville, Maryland

Head coach

- Jim Valvano (Rutgers)

Assistant coach(es)

- Ray Martin (Notre Dame)
- Tom Abatemarco (Dowling)
- Ed McLean (Western Carolina)

Legend

- (C) Team captain
- (S) Suspended
- (I) Ineligible
- (W) Walk-on
- Injured
- Current redshirt

== Cinderella run ==
The Wolfpack entered the season ranked in the Top 20 and entered conference play ranked #19 in the nation. Their second conference game was against Virginia, ranked #2 in the country at the time and undefeated against the Wolfpack's senior class. NC State took a lead early behind the shooting of guard and senior captain Dereck Whittenburg. Later in the game, though, Whittenburg was being guarded by Cavalier guard Othell Wilson on a jump shot and when Whittenburg came down, he landed with one foot on the floor and the other stepping on Wilson's foot. Whittenburg was taken off the court with what was later diagnosed as a broken foot.

With Whittenburg injured and facing significant time out, the Wolfpack struggled for the remainder of the regular season. While NC State won ten of the seventeen games that Whittenburg was sidelined with his injury, including a win against rival and defending national champion North Carolina, the seven losses they incurred left them with a 17–10 record entering the ACC Tournament.

At the time, the NCAA had a 52-team field for its annual tournament; the expansion took place just in time for the 1983 tournament, meaning that there were four extra spots available for potential qualifiers. While this did leave the potential for the Wolfpack to get into the tournament as an at-large if they did not win the ACC, a loss in the tournament would make eleven for the year and there would not be much room for error in an era prior to the expansion of the field to 64 teams.

Thus, the only sure thing for NC State would be to win the ACC Tournament outright, which would garner them the conference's automatic bid to the NCAA tournament. They did just that, winning three games in the tournament to claim the title. The Wolfpack knocked off Wake Forest in the first game and North Carolina in the semifinals before recording their first victory over then-#2 Virginia in the finals.

On Selection Sunday, NC State found out it would be playing in the West Region of the tournament as the number six seed. This region presented the Wolfpack with a potentially difficult road to the Final Four, as its top three seeds were ranked in the top 10 in the final polls. Not only that, but the top seed in the region was their conference rival Virginia, which meant that the Wolfpack, should they both advance to the regional final, would have to find a way to beat the Cavaliers a second time.

At the time, the NCAA did not employ the “pod system” they use today to determine what teams play where to minimize travel costs and concerns for the first two rounds of the tournament. Instead, two venues per region were selected to host these games. In addition, since the field resulted in each region having an uneven number of teams (thirteen), the structure was different. The top four seeds in each region received byes into the second round of the tournament, and the teams seeded fifth and below played in the first round for the right to advance to face them (except for the team seeded twelfth, as that team would be determined in a game similar to the ones played in the modern tournament's First Four).

NC State was sent to Corvallis, Oregon's Gill Coliseum for their sub-regional. The #6 seed Wolfpack would face the #11 seed in their first matchup, which was Jim Harrick’s West Coast Conference champion Pepperdine; the winner of that matchup would advance to play the region’s #3 seed, the 28-2 PCAA champion UNLV coached by Jerry Tarkanian, for the right to advance to the Sweet Sixteen phase of the tournament in Ogden, Utah at the Dee Events Center.

Trailing late in the game against Pepperdine, the Wolfpack rallied to force overtime and then outlasted the Waves in a second overtime period to advance. There they rallied again against the favored UNLV squad to hand them only their third loss of the season and send the Wolfpack to the regionals.

The Wolfpack’s opponent in the regional semifinal was Western Athletic Conference champion Utah, who like NC State had entered the tournament needing to win their conference tournament to qualify as they had thirteen losses; led by coach Jerry Pimm, the #10 seed Utes defeated #7 seed Illinois and #2 seed UCLA in Boise.

NC State easily defeated Utah to claim a spot in the regional final, with their nineteen-point margin of victory their biggest since their regular season finale against Wake Forest. This set up the Wolfpack’s fourth meeting of the year with Virginia, who toppled #4 seeded Boston College, led by future national championship winner Gary Williams, in the other regional semifinal. For the third time in four games, NC State emerged with a close victory, winning 63-62 after Virginia star Ralph Sampson missed a shot as time expired.

At the Final Four in Albuquerque, New Mexico, the Wolfpack finished off their run to the championship game by defeating Georgia in the semifinals on Saturday, which set up a matchup with top-ranked and heavily-favored Houston on Monday night at The Pit. During this run, NC State earned the nickname "Cardiac Pack" based in part on their "Wolfpack" mascot and the series of close games that took them to the title.

== Fouling strategy ==
Head coach Jim Valvano was noted for employing a then-little used strategy late in games. The NCAA had yet to adopt a shot clock for college basketball, and as the games wore on some teams were just content to keep possession of the ball late in games to protect a lead, passing the ball around until the clock hit zero. Valvano would instruct his players to intentionally foul opposing players, thus putting them on the free-throw line. While this strategy was risky, as it allowed NC State's opponents a chance to increase their lead, it enabled the Wolfpack to extend the game as each foul stopped the clock and the team could also capitalize if the opponents missed their free throws. They used this to great effect in the ACC tournament, including against rival North Carolina and Virginia, and employed it again in four of their six NCAA victories. Nowhere was the strategy more widely seen, however, than in the national championship game.

== National championship game ==
In the final game on April 4 in Albuquerque, NC State led at halftime by a score of 33–25. Houston was hampered by foul trouble that plagued star Clyde Drexler, who picked up three fouls within the first few minutes. Drexler begged to remain in the game, but was forced to come out after Wolfpack sophomore guard Terry Gannon drew a charging foul on him. The foul was controversial as replays showed that Gannon appeared to grab Drexler's legs as he went down, and Drexler believed the foul should have gone against Gannon and not him (Gannon later said that Drexler never forgot the call; in the ESPN documentary about the team, he told his teammates that years later, by which time he had become a sports broadcaster, Gannon saw Drexler in the locker room at the 1991 NBA All-Star Game and once Drexler found out who he was he instantly cursed him out over the foul).

In the second half, the Cougars came out with a second wind and established control of the game. With Cougars coach Guy Lewis shifting his focus to getting center Hakeem Olajuwon the basketball on offense, using the advantage he had over NC State's big men Lorenzo Charles and Cozell McQueen, Houston outscored the Wolfpack 17–2 in the first ten minutes of the half to give themselves a 42–35 lead.

However, things were not all good for Houston. Albuquerque is located in New Mexico's Sandia Mountains at a 5,100-foot (1,550 m) elevation. Thus, as is the case with other high-altitude cities, athletes are tested by the effects of the elevation as well as their own physical capabilities. One of the players most affected by the altitude change was Olajuwon, who had taken on an increased workload to try and get his team back in the game. Eventually, Coach Lewis had to take Olajuwon out of the game so he could take oxygen and recover. He then decided that in order to preserve his star center's health, the Cougars needed to start slowing the game down. Thus, he called for his "Locomotion" offensive set to be put into play. This meant that instead of driving to the basket every possession, Houston would pass the ball around to wind down the clock before passing to one of the designated scorers.

The move, however, failed for two reasons. One, it deviated from Houston's strength by abandoning their strategy of pushing the ball up the court. Second, it enabled Valvano to go to his fallback option of extending the game by fouling. Exacerbating the situation was that Houston, as high powered offensively as it was, had not been a strong free-throw shooting team during the season. As such, the Wolfpack were able to both force the Cougars into mistakes and take advantage of the missed free throws to chip away at Houston's advantage. NC State outscored Houston 17–10 in the eight minutes that followed and tied the game at 52.

On what would be Houston's last possession, Valvano called for his defenders to sit back and let Cougars point guard Alvin Franklin advance the ball and begin passing it around. Lewis wanted to keep the ball in the hands of Drexler and sophomore forward Reid Gettys, his two best foul shooters, to try and force them to foul either one of those two players and for anyone else to quickly give it up once they had the ball. Valvano instead wanted Franklin, a freshman, to take the shots and instructed his players to foul him once he got the ball back. Franklin received the ball with 1:05 left but instead of immediately passing it, as he had done already on the play, he held the ball for an additional second. Wolfpack senior point guard Dereck Whittenburg took advantage of Franklin's momentary lapse in concentration and committed the foul to send Franklin, a 63% free throw shooter, to the line for a one-and-one. The idea, as later stated by Whittenburg and fellow senior Thurl Bailey years later, was to not only put a poor foul shooter on the line but force Franklin, as the youngest starter on the squad, to face the enormousness of the moment with a sellout crowd at The Pit and millions of viewers watching at home. Whatever the idea may have ultimately been, it worked as Franklin missed the shot. NC State took the rebound and with 44 seconds on the clock, Valvano called a time out and drew up a final play for his point guard Whittenburg to take the last shot.

Houston, meanwhile, needed a defensive stop to extend the game. Lewis decided to move from the man-to-man defense his team had been running the whole game to a half court trap with Benny Anders as the point man, with the goal being to force NC State to spread the ball around and force a turnover. The Wolfpack, who were not expecting the defensive adjustment, were forced to deviate and began passing the ball around just to keep the Cougars from stealing it. Houston nearly got the turnover it was looking for when Whittenburg made an errant pass to Gannon that Drexler nearly came away with before the sophomore regained control. The ball eventually found its way to Sidney Lowe, who found Bailey standing in the lower left-hand corner of the court and passed it his way so he could take the shot. Bailey, however, wanted no part of Lowe's idea as he had not had a good half shooting the ball and began looking back toward Whittenburg. With a pair of defenders on him, Bailey threw what his teammate later called a "poor fundamental" overhand pass that Anders could easily have stolen.

At that moment Whittenburg harkened back to his high school days with Morgan Wootten at DeMatha Catholic High School in the Maryland suburbs of Washington, D.C. One thing Wootten always taught his players was that when receiving the ball, bring it in with both hands. As Anders went for the ball, Whittenburg was able to put that lesson to use and by getting his other hand on the ball, he was able to get more control of it and prevent Anders from knocking it away. Anders was only able to get his fingertips on the ball, which temporarily stripped the ball from Whittenburg but did not enable him to take it away. Had Anders been able to steal, he would have likely had an uncontested breakaway to the other end of the court where he could have easily dunked the ball and given the Cougars the lead. Since the rules of the day dictated that the entire game be played with a running clock, the Wolfpack would most likely not have been able to get the ball up the court in time for a potential tying shot.

When Whittenburg regained control, five seconds were showing on the clock and he turned to try to get some sort of shot off from his position thirty-five feet from the goal. While the shot was in line with the basket, Whittenburg had not gotten enough on it and the ball was going to come up well short. At the foot of the goal stood Olajuwon and Wolfpack center Lorenzo Charles, who watched Whittenburg's air ball. Olajuwon hesitated briefly, as he was in position to grab the ball and likely force overtime but did not want to jump too soon and be called for goaltending. Charles took advantage of the hesitation and went up for the errant shot. With two seconds left on the clock Charles took the ball and drove it through the hoop with two hands for the decisive score and gave the Wolfpack its first national championship since 1974.

== 30 for 30 ==
The team's story was chronicled in "Survive and Advance", an episode in the ESPN 30 for 30 series. Dereck Whittenburg produced the documentary and was one of several players who appeared in it, alongside his teammates Thurl Bailey, Sidney Lowe, Terry Gannon, Cozell McQueen, and Ernie Myers. Valvano's widow, Pam Valvano Strasser, also appears in the documentary as do several of his assistants. Hakeem Olajuwon, David Rose, and Reid Gettys of the defeated Houston squad also appear to offer their take on their loss, as do then-North Carolina assistant Roy Williams and then-Pepperdine coach Jim Harrick, whose teams were defeated in the ACC and NCAA tournaments by the Wolfpack. Mike Krzyzewski is also featured prominently in the film, describing how his relationship with Valvano (who started at NC State the same year Krzyzewski took over at Duke) evolved over the years from an adversarial one to one where the two men became close friends.

In addition to the 1982–83 team's season (and their 30-year reunion, which is marked by the absence of the recently deceased Lorenzo Charles), Valvano's career after that season is a major focal point, including the scandal that led to his resignation from NC State in 1990.

The emotional impact Valvano's cancer diagnosis had on his players and coaches is also heavily featured. In addition to Valvano's famous speech at the 1993 ESPY Awards, special attention is paid to his appearance at the ceremony honoring the 1982–83 team held several weeks earlier. Valvano had not been expected to attend, partly due to his illness but also to lingering bad feelings present from his forced resignation three years earlier. However, in what would prove to be the last time many of his players would see him, Valvano made his appearance toward the end of the ceremony and spoke to the crowd about how the team never gave up and how it inspired him to continue his fight against cancer.

== Schedule ==
Date time, TV	Rank^{#}	Opponent^{#}	Result	Record	Site city, state
Regular season
November 29*	No. 16	Western Carolina	W 103–66	1–0	Reynolds Coliseum; Raleigh, NC
December 3*	No. 18	North Carolina A&T	W 100–70	2–0	Reynolds Coliseum; Raleigh, NC
December 8*	No. 18	East Carolina	W 57–49	3–0	Reynolds Coliseum; Raleigh, NC
December 11*	No. 18	Michigan State	W 45–41	4–0	Reynolds Coliseum; Raleigh, NC
December 21*; 8 pm, ESPN	No. 15	at No. 14 Louisville	L 52–57	4–1	Freedom Hall; Louisville, KY
December 28*	No. 17	vs. No. 20 West Virginia	W 67–59	5–1	Brendan Byrne Arena; East Rutherford, NJ
January 3*	No. 17	Farleigh Dickinson	W 111–76	6–1	Reynolds Coliseum; Raleigh, NC
January 7	No. 16	at Clemson	W 76–70	7–1 (1–0)	Littlejohn Coliseum; Clemson, SC
January 9*	No. 16	No. 15 Missouri	L 42–49	7–2	Hearnes Center; Columbia, MO
January 12; ESPN	No. 19	No. 2 Virginia	L 80–88	7–3 (1–1)	Reynolds Coliseum; Raleigh, NC
January 15	No. 19	Georgia Tech	W 81–61	8–3 (2–1)	Reynolds Coliseum; Raleigh, NC
January 19; ESPN		at No. 3 North Carolina	L 81–99	8–4 (2–2)	Carmichael Auditorium; Chapel Hill, NC
January 22		at Wake Forest	L 73–91	8–5 (2–3)	Greensboro Coliseum; Greensboro, NC
January 23*; 1 pm, CBS		No. 6 Memphis State	L 53–57	8–6	Reynolds Coliseum; Raleigh, NC
January 26		Duke	W 94–79	9–6 (3–3)	Reynolds Coliseum; Raleigh, NC
January 29		at Maryland	L 81–86	9–7 (3–4)	Cole Field House; College Park, MD
February 2		at Georgia Tech	W 74–64	10–7 (4–4)	Alexander Memorial Coliseum; Atlanta, GA
February 4*		vs. Furman; North-South Doubleheader	W 51–48	11–7	Charlotte Coliseum; Charlotte, NC
February 5*		vs. The Citadel; North-South Doubleheader	W 57–47	12–7	Charlotte Coliseum; Charlotte, NC
February 9		Clemson	W 90–83	13–7 (5–4)	Reynolds Coliseum; Raleigh, NC
February 12*; 3 pm, NBC		Notre Dame	L 42–43	13–8	Reynolds Coliseum; Raleigh, NC
February 16*		UNC Wilmington	W 90–69	14–8	Reynolds Coliseum; Raleigh, NC
February 19; 2:30 pm, ESPN		No. 3 North Carolina	W 70–63	15–8 (6–4)	Reynolds Coliseum; Raleigh, NC
February 23		at Duke	W 96–79	16–8 (7–4)	Cameron Indoor Stadium; Durham, NC
February 27; 2 pm, ESPN		at No. 3 Virginia	L 75–86	16–9 (7–5)	University Hall; Charlottesville, VA
March 3		Maryland	L 58–67	16–10 (7–6)	Reynolds Coliseum; Raleigh, NC
March 5; 1 pm, ESPN		Wake Forest	W 130–89	17–10 (8–6)	Reynolds Coliseum; Raleigh, NC
ACC Tournament
March 11*; 2:30 pm, ESPN	(4)	vs. (5) Wake Forest; ACC tournament	W 71–70	18–10	The Omni; Atlanta, GA
March 12*; 1:30 pm, ESPN	(4)	vs. (1) No. 5 North Carolina; ACC Tournament	W 91–84 ^{OT}	19–10	The Omni; Atlanta, GA
March 13*; 1 pm, NBC/ESPN	(4)	vs. (2) No. 2 Virginia; ACC Tournament	W 81–78	20–10	The Omni; Atlanta, GA
NCAA Tournament
March 18*; 11:30 pm, CBS	(6 W) No. 16	vs. (11 W) Pepperdine; NCAA tournament	W 69–67 ^{2OT}	21–10	Gill Coliseum; Corvallis, OR
March 20*; 3:45 pm, CBS	(6 W) No. 16	vs. (3 W) No. 6 UNLV; NCAA Tournament	W 71–70	22–10	Gill Coliseum; Corvallis, OR
March 24*; 9 pm, ESPN	(6 W) No. 16	vs. (10 W) Utah; NCAA Tournament	W 75–56	23–10	Dee Events Center; Ogden, UT
March 26*; 3 pm, CBS	(6 W) No. 16	vs. (1 W) No. 4 Virginia; NCAA Tournament	W 63–62	24–10	Dee Events Center; Ogden, UT
April 2*; 3:30 pm, CBS	(6 W) No. 16	vs. (4 E) No. 18 Georgia; NCAA Tournament	W 67–60	25–10	The Pit; Albuquerque, NM
April 4*; 9 pm, CBS	(6 W) No. 16	vs. (1 MW) No. 1 Houston; NCAA tournament championship	W 54–52	26–10	The Pit; Albuquerque, NM
*Non-conference game. ^{#}Rankings from AP Poll. (#) Tournament seedings in parentheses.

== Team players drafted into the NBA ==
Year	Round	Pick	Player	NBA club
1983	1	7	Thurl Bailey	Utah Jazz
1983	2	25	Sidney Lowe	Chicago Bulls
1983	3	51	Dereck Whittenburg	Phoenix Suns
1985	2	41	Lorenzo Charles	Atlanta Hawks
1985	4	91	Cozell McQueen	Milwaukee Bucks
