= Tom Abatemarco =

American basketball coach

Biographical details
- Born: October 3, 1949 (age 76)

Playing career
- 1971–1974: Dowling

Coaching career (HC unless noted)
- 1974–1975: NYIT (assistant)
- 1975–1977: Iona (assistant)
- 1977–1978: Davidson (assistant)
- 1978–1979: St. John's (assistant)
- 1979–1981: Maryland (assistant)
- 1981–1982: Virginia Tech (assistant)
- 1982–1986: NC State (assistant)
- 1986–1988: Lamar
- 1988–1990: Drake
- 1991–1994: Colorado (assistant)
- 1994–1997: Rutgers (assistant)
- 1997–2000: Sacramento State
- 2003–2008: Sacramento Monarchs (assistant)
- 2003–2004: Utah (assistant)
- 2008–2009: Reno Bighorns (assistant)
- 2010–2012: Colorado (assistant)
- 2013–2014: Loyola Marymount (assistant)
- 2014–2015: Tulsa (assistant)
- 2015–2018: Florida Gulf Coast (assistant)
- 2020–2023: Iona (assistant)

Head coaching record
- Overall: 70–121

Tom Abatemarco (born October 3, 1949) is an American college basketball coach, currently an assistant for the Iona Gaels of the Metro Atlantic Athletic Conference (MAAC). Abatemarco has previously been a head coach at Lamar, Drake and Sacramento State. He was also an assistant to Jim Valvano on the 1983 national champion NC State team and spent time as a professional assistant in the Women's National Basketball Association and the NBA Development League.

Abatemarco's best season as a head coach came with Lamar in the 1987–88 season where the team won 20 games. He then moved to Drake, but his tenure there was short. After a player revolt in his second season he resigned his post on February 20, 1990.

In 2020, Abatemarco was hired by Rick Pitino as an assistant at Iona, marking his 21st coaching stop.
