= 1983 ACC men's basketball tournament =

- Classification: Division I
- Season: 1982–83
- Teams: 8
- Site: Omni Coliseum; Atlanta, Georgia
- Champions: NC State (9th title)
- Winning coach: Jim Valvano (1st title)
- MVP: Sidney Lowe (NC State)
- Television: Raycom/Jefferson Productions (Entire Tournament); NBC (Championship game coverage outside the ACC footprint)

1982–83 ACC men's basketball standings
	Conf.				Overall
Team	W		L	PCT	W		L	PCT
No. 8 North Carolina	12	–	2	.857	28	–	8	.778
No. 4 Virginia	12	–	2	.857	29	–	5	.853
Maryland	8	–	6	.571	20	–	10	.667
No. 16 NC State †	8	–	6	.571	26	–	10	.722
Wake Forest	7	–	7	.500	20	–	10	.667
Georgia Tech	4	–	10	.286	13	–	15	.464
Duke	3	–	11	.214	11	–	17	.393
Clemson	2	–	12	.143	11	–	20	.355
† 1983 ACC tournament winner Rankings from AP poll

The 1983 Atlantic Coast Conference men's basketball tournament was held in Atlanta, Georgia, at the Omni Coliseum from March 11–13. NC State defeated Virginia, 81–78, to win the championship. Sidney Lowe of NC State was named tournament MVP. It was the first time the event was held in Atlanta.

== Bracket ==
Quarterfinals; March 11
1	#5 North Carolina	105
8	Clemson	79
4	NC State	71
5	Wake Forest	70
2	#2 Virginia	109
7	Duke	66
6	Georgia Tech	64^{OT}
3	Maryland	58

Semifinals; March 12
1	#5 North Carolina	84
4	NC State	91^{OT}
2	#2 Virginia	96
6	Georgia Tech	67

Championship Game; March 13
4	NC State	81
2	#2 Virginia	78
