= 1982–83 Virginia Cavaliers men's basketball team =

American college basketball season

1982–83 Virginia Cavaliers men's basketball

ACC regular season co–champions

NCAA tournament, Elite Eight
- Conference: Atlantic Coast Conference

Ranking
- Coaches: No. 4
- AP: No. 4
- Record: 29–5 (12–2 ACC)
- Head coach: Terry Holland (9th season)
- Assistant coaches: Jim Larrañaga (4th season); Jeff Jones (1st season); Dave Odom (1st season)
- Home arena: University Hall

1982–83 ACC men's basketball standings
	Conf.				Overall
Team	W		L	PCT	W		L	PCT
No. 8 North Carolina	12	–	2	.857	28	–	8	.778
No. 4 Virginia	12	–	2	.857	29	–	5	.853
Maryland	8	–	6	.571	20	–	10	.667
No. 16 NC State †	8	–	6	.571	26	–	10	.722
Wake Forest	7	–	7	.500	20	–	10	.667
Georgia Tech	4	–	10	.286	13	–	15	.464
Duke	3	–	11	.214	11	–	17	.393
Clemson	2	–	12	.143	11	–	20	.355
† 1983 ACC tournament winner Rankings from AP poll

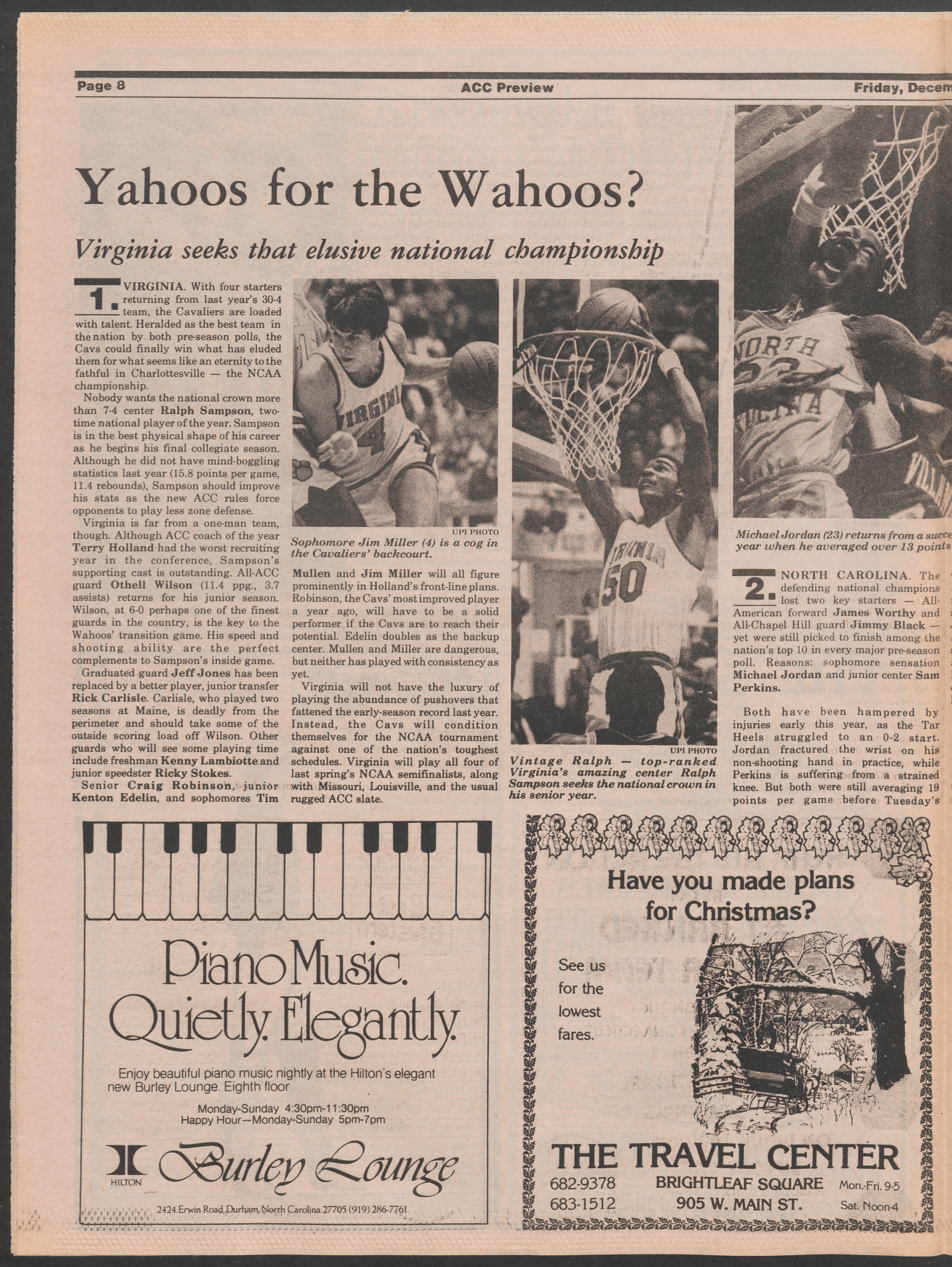
A Duke University student newspaper article on the Cavaliers.

The 1982–83 Virginia Cavaliers men's basketball team represented the University of Virginia and was a member of the Atlantic Coast Conference.

On November 17, 1982, in an exhibition game played in Richmond, Virginia at the Richmond Coliseum, preseason No. 1 Virginia defeated the USSR National Team, that was led by a then 17-year-old Arvydas Sabonis, 94-87 in double overtime. Ralph Sampson scored 13 points, 25 rebounds, and 9 blocked shots, and Othell Wilson scored 21 points.

On December 23, 1982, the Chaminade Silverswords of Honolulu defeated the No. 1 ranked Cavaliers 77–72. Silverswords player Tony Randolph scored 19 points, and Jim Dunham scored 17. Chaminade was ranked fourth in the NAIA rankings; center Ralph Sampson played the entire game and was held to twelve points.

Virginia's two losses in conference were to co-champion North Carolina, and their two losses in the postseason were to eventual national champion North Carolina State; by three points in the final of the ACC tournament and by one point in the West region finals of the NCAA tournament.

== Roster ==
1982–83 Virginia Cavaliers men's basketball team
Players
Coaches

Pos.	#	Name	Height	Weight	Year	Hometown
F	4	Jim Miller	6 ft 8 in (2.03 m)	—	So	Princeton, West Virginia
F	10	Craig Robinson	6 ft 8 in (2.03 m)	—	So	Montclair, New Jersey
G	11	Othell Wilson	6 ft 0 in (1.83 m)	—	Jr	Woodbridge, Virginia
G	15	Ricky Stokes	5 ft 10 in (1.78 m)	—	Jr	Richmond, Virginia
F	30	Kenton Edelin	6 ft 7 in (2.01 m)	—	Jr	Alexandria, Virginia
G	32	Doug Newburg	6 ft 2 in (1.88 m)	—	Sr	McLean, Virginia
G	33	Kenny Johnson	6 ft 0 in (1.83 m)	—	So	Baltimore, Maryland
G	34	Rick Carlisle	6 ft 5 in (1.96 m)	—	Jr	Ogdensburg, New York
C	42	Wingo Smith	6 ft 9 in (2.06 m)	—	Jr	Indialantic, Florida
G	44	Kenny Lambiotte	6 ft 4 in (1.93 m)	—	Fr	Woodstock, Virginia
G/F	45	Tim Mullen	6 ft 5 in (1.96 m)	—	So	Ridgewood, New Jersey
F	51	Dan Merrifield	6 ft 6 in (1.98 m)	—	So	Linwood, New Jersey
C	50	Ralph Sampson (C)	7 ft 4 in (2.24 m)	—	Sr	Harrisonburg, Virginia

Head coach

- Terry Holland (Davidson)

Assistant coach(es)

- Jim Larrañaga (Providence)
- Jeff Jones (Virginia)
- Dave Odom (Guilford)

Legend

- (C) Team captain
- (S) Suspended
- (I) Ineligible
- (W) Walk-on
- Injured
- Current redshirt

== Schedule ==
Date time, TV	Rank^{#}	Opponent^{#}	Result	Record	Site (attendance) city, state
Exhibition game
Mar. 10		Richmond YMCA	W 18–9		Richmond, Virginia
Regular season
Nov. 26*	No. 1	Johns Hopkins	W 124–60	1–0	University Hall (9,000); Charlottesville, Virginia
Nov. 27*	No. 1	VCU	W 69–63	2–0	University Hall (9,000); Charlottesville, Virginia
Dec. 1*	No. 1	at James Madison	W 51–34	3–0	JMU Convocation Center (7,700); Harrisonburg, Virginia
Dec. 4*	No. 1	VMI	W 86–41	4–0	University Hall (9,000); Charlottesville, Virginia
Dec. 8	No. 1	at Duke	W 104–91	5–0 (1–0)	Cameron Indoor Stadium (8,564); Durham, North Carolina
Dec. 11*	No. 1	at No. 3 Georgetown	W 68–63	6–0 (1–0)	Capital Centre (19,035); Landover, Maryland
Dec. 16*	No. 1	vs. No. 14 Houston	W 72–63	7–0 (1–0)	Aoyama Gakuin Memorial Hall (5,000); Tokyo, Japan
Dec. 18*	No. 1	vs. Utah	W 80–57	8–0 (1–0)	Aoyama Gakuin Memorial Hall (5,000); Tokyo, Japan
Dec. 23*	No. 1	at Chaminade	L 72–77	8–1 (1–0)	Neal S. Blaisdell Center (3,383); Honolulu, Hawaii
Dec. 29*	No. 4	vs. Richmond	W 102–85	9–1 (1–0)	Richmond Coliseum (10,716); Richmond, Virginia
Dec. 30*	No. 4	vs. Old Dominion	W 75–59	10–1 (1–0)	Richmond Coliseum (10,716); Richmond, Virginia
Jan. 8	No. 4	at Maryland	W 83–64	11–1 (2–0)	Cole Field House (14,500); College Park, Maryland
Jan. 12	No. 2	at No. 19 NC State	W 88–80	12–1 (3–0)	Reynolds Coliseum (12,400); Raleigh, North Carolina
Jan. 15	No. 2	No. 11 North Carolina	L 95–101	12–2 (3–1)	University Hall (9,000); Charlottesville, Virginia
Jan. 17	No. 2	at Georgia Tech	W 66–52	13–2 (4–1)	Alexander Memorial Coliseum (10,543); Atlanta, Georgia
Jan. 19*	No. 7	at No. 17 Virginia Tech	W 74–64	14–2 (4–1)	Richmond Coliseum (10,716); Richmond, Virginia
Jan. 22	No. 7	Clemson	W 105–87	15–2 (5–1)	University Hall (9,000); Charlottesville, Virginia
Jan. 26*	No. 6	George Washington	W 59–44	16–2 (5–1)	University Hall (9,000); Charlottesville, Virginia
Jan. 29*	No. 6	No. 8 Louisville	W 98–81	17–2 (5–1)	University Hall (9,000); Charlottesville, Virginia
Feb. 3	No. 3	Wake Forest	W 89–75	18–2 (6–1)	University Hall (9,000); Charlottesville, Virginia
Feb. 5	No. 3	Duke	W 105–84	19–2 (7–1)	University Hall (9,000); Charlottesville, Virginia
Feb. 10	No. 3	at No. 1 North Carolina	L 63–64	19–3 (7–2)	Carmichael Arena (10,000); Chapel Hill, North Carolina
Feb. 14	No. 3	Georgia Tech	W 92–69	20–3 (8–2)	University Hall (9,000); Charlottesville, Virginia
Feb. 20*	No. 5	vs. No. 12 Missouri	W 68–53	21–3	Byrne Meadowlands Arena (15,767); East Rutherford, New Jersey
Feb. 23	No. 3	at Clemson	W 85–83 ^{OT}	22–3 (9–2)	Littlejohn Coliseum (11,000); Clemson, South Carolina
Feb. 27	No. 3	NC State	W 86–75	23–3 (10–2)	University Hall (9,000); Charlottesville, Virginia
Mar. 2	No. 2	at Wake Forest	W 107–74	24–3 (11–2)	Greensboro Coliseum (15,300); Greensboro, North Carolina
Mar. 6	No. 2	Maryland	W 83–81	25–3 (12–2)	University Hall (9,000); Charlottesville, Virginia
ACC Tournament
Mar. 11	(2) No. 2	vs. (7) Duke; Quarterfinals	W 109–66	26–3	Omni Coliseum (16,723); Atlanta, Georgia
Mar. 12	(2) No. 2	vs. (6) Georgia Tech; Semifinals	W 96–67	27–3	Omni Coliseum (16,723); Atlanta, Georgia
Mar. 13	(2) No. 2	vs. (4) NC State; Championship	L 78–81	27–4	Omni Coliseum (16,723); Atlanta, Georgia
NCAA Tournament
Mar. 19	(1 W) No. 4	vs. (8 W) Washington State; Second Round	W 54–49	28–4	BSU Pavilion (12,177); Boise, Idaho
Mar. 24	(1 W) No. 4	vs. (4) No. 11 Boston College; Sweet Sixteen	W 95–92	29–4	Dee Events Center (12,084); Ogden, Utah
Mar. 26	(1 W) No. 4	vs. (6 W) No. 16 NC State; Elite Eight	L 62–63	29–5	Dee Events Center (12,087); Ogden, Utah
*Non-conference game. ^{#}Rankings from AP poll. (#) Tournament seedings in parentheses. All times are in Eastern time.

== Rankings ==
Ranking movements Legend: ██ Increase in ranking ██ Decrease in ranking — = Not ranked
	Week																
Poll	Pre	1	2	3	4	5	6	7	8	9	10	11	12	13	14	15	Final
AP	1	1	1	1	1	4	4	2	7	6	3	3	5	3	2	2	4
Coaches	1	—	1	1	1	3	4	2	6	4	2	2	5	3	2	2	4

== Awards and honors ==
- Ralph Sampson, Adolph Rupp Trophy
- Ralph Sampson, Naismith College Player of the Year
- Ralph Sampson, USBWA College Player of the Year
- Ralph Sampson, John R. Wooden Award

== NBA draft ==
Year	Round	Pick	Player	NBA club
1983	1	1	Ralph Sampson	Houston Rockets
1983	3	68	Craig Robinson	Boston Celtics
1984	2	35	Othell Wilson	Golden State Warriors
