= 1982–83 Maryland Terrapins men's basketball team =

American college basketball season

1982–83 Maryland Terrapins men's basketball
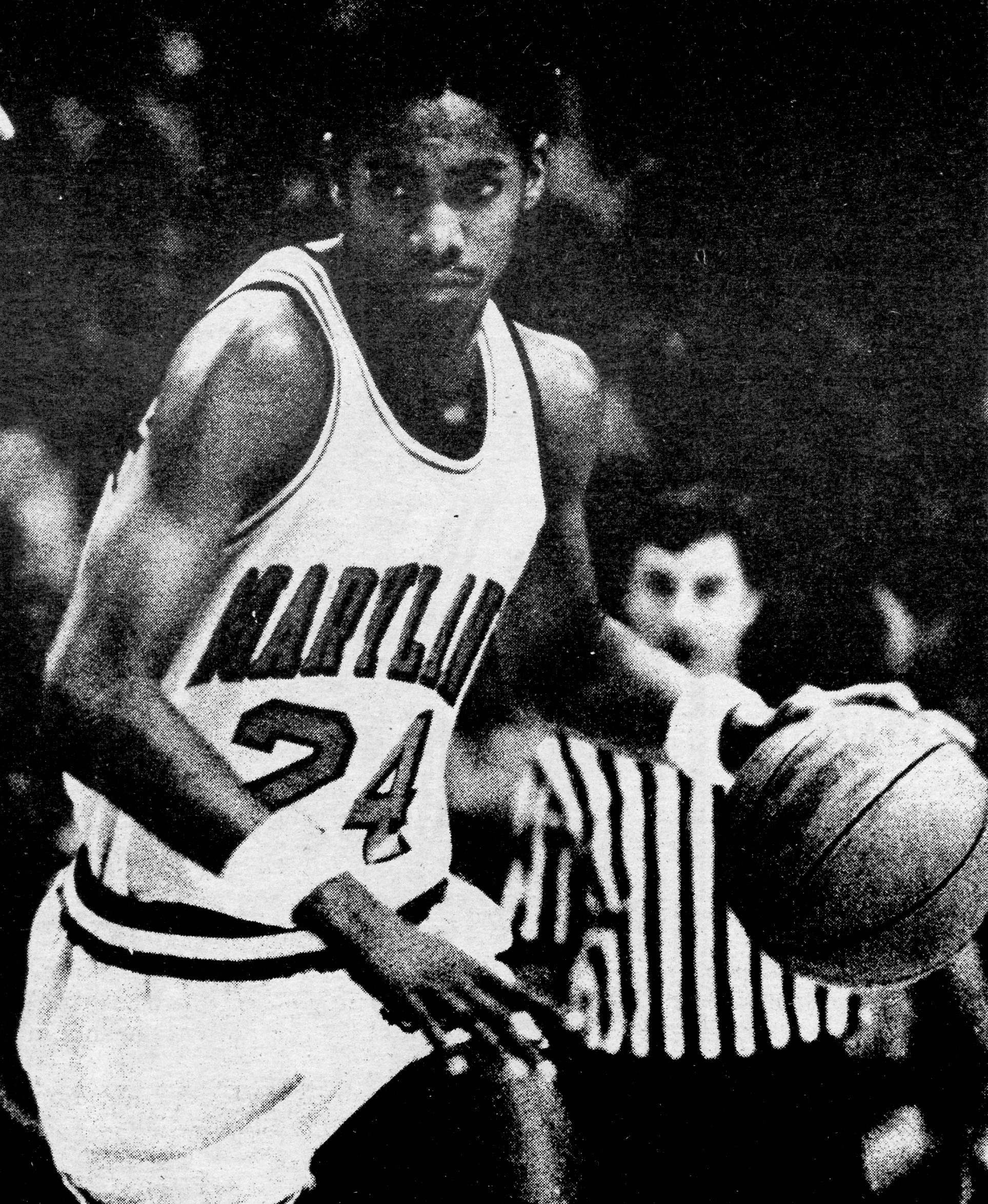
- Adrian Branch, 1983

NCAA tournament, Second Round
- Conference: Atlantic Coast Conference
- Record: 20–10 (8–6 ACC)
- Head coach: Lefty Driesell
- Home arena: Cole Field House

1982–83 ACC men's basketball standings
	Conf.				Overall
Team	W		L	PCT	W		L	PCT
No. 8 North Carolina	12	–	2	.857	28	–	8	.778
No. 4 Virginia	12	–	2	.857	29	–	5	.853
Maryland	8	–	6	.571	20	–	10	.667
No. 16 NC State †	8	–	6	.571	26	–	10	.722
Wake Forest	7	–	7	.500	20	–	10	.667
Georgia Tech	4	–	10	.286	13	–	15	.464
Duke	3	–	11	.214	11	–	17	.393
Clemson	2	–	12	.143	11	–	20	.355
† 1983 ACC tournament winner Rankings from AP poll

The 1982–83 Maryland Terrapins men's basketball team represented the University of Maryland as a member of the Atlantic Coast Conference during the 1982–83 men's college basketball season. The team was led by head coach Lefty Driesell and played their home games at Cole Field House in College Park, Maryland. The Terrapins finished the season with a 20–10 overall record (8–6 ACC) and reached the second round of the NCAA tournament before losing to No.1 ranked and eventual National runner-up Houston and Phi Slama Jama.

== Roster ==
1982–83 Maryland Terrapins men's basketball team
Players
Coaches

Pos.	#	Name	Height	Weight	Year	Hometown
G	10	Jeff Adkins	6 ft 5 in (1.96 m)	185 lb (84 kg)	So	Martinsville, VA
G	11	Chuck Driesell	6 ft 2 in (1.88 m)	170 lb (77 kg)	So	Silver Spring, MD
G	12	Jeff Baxter	6 ft 1 in (1.85 m)	165 lb (75 kg)	So	Washington, DC
G	14	Steve Rivers	6 ft 3 in (1.91 m)	170 lb (77 kg)	Jr	Uniondale, NY
F	22	Mark Fothergill	6 ft 9 in (2.06 m)	220 lb (100 kg)	Jr	Somerset, KY
F	24	Adrian Branch	6 ft 8 in (2.03 m)	185 lb (84 kg)	So	Largo, MD
C	31	Bryan Palmer	6 ft 10 in (2.08 m)	205 lb (93 kg)	Fr	Glen Rock, PA
F	33	Pete Hobert	6 ft 6 in (1.98 m)	190 lb (86 kg)	Jr	Fairfax, VA
F	34	Len Bias	6 ft 8 in (2.03 m)	195 lb (88 kg)	Fr	Landover, MD
F	42	Herman Veal	6 ft 6 in (1.98 m)	200 lb (91 kg)	Jr	Jackson, MS
C	54	Ben Coleman	6 ft 9 in (2.06 m)	220 lb (100 kg)	Jr	Minneapolis, MN

Head coach

- Charles "Lefty" Driesell

Assistant coach(es)

- Sherman Dillard
- Mel Cartwright
- Ron Bradley

Legend

- (C) Team captain
- (S) Suspended
- (I) Ineligible
- (W) Walk-on
- Injured
- Current redshirt

Roster

== Schedule ==
Date time, TV	Rank^{#}	Opponent^{#}	Result	Record	Site city, state
Regular season
November 27*		vs. Penn State	L 79–97	0–1	Baltimore Arena; Baltimore
December 1*		Maryland Eastern Shore	W 91–70	1–1	Cole Field House; College Park, Maryland
December 4*		at Canisius	W 67–66	2–1	
December 8*		St. Joseph's	L 56–64	2–2	Cole Field House; College Park, Maryland
December 11*		Duquesne	W 85–64	3–2	Cole Field House; College Park, Maryland
December 14*		Towson State	W 66–56	4–2	Cole Field House; College Park, Maryland
December 23*		UCLA	W 80–79 ^{2OT}	5–2	Cole Field House; College Park, Maryland
January 3*		American	W 73–71	6–2	Cole Field House; College Park, Maryland
January 5*		William & Mary	W 56–51	7–2	Cole Field House; College Park, Maryland
January 8		No. 4 Virginia	L 64–83	7–3 (0–1)	Cole Field House (14,500); College Park, Maryland
January 12		at No. 11 North Carolina	L 71–72	7–4 (0–2)	Carmichael Auditorium; Chapel Hill, North Carolina
January 15		Duke	L 67–86	7–5 (0–3)	Cole Field House; College Park, Maryland
January 19		at Clemson	W 80–61	8–5 (1–3)	Littlejohn Coliseum; Clemson, South Carolina
January 22*		Notre Dame	W 68–67	9–5	Cole Field House; College Park, Maryland
January 26*		at Holy Cross	W 55–53	10–5	Worcester Centrum; Worcester, Massachusetts
January 29		NC State	W 86–81	11–5 (2–3)	Cole Field House; College Park, Maryland
January 31*		Navy	W 98–73	12–5	Cole Field House; College Park, Maryland
February 2*		Old Dominion	W 87–67	13–5	Cole Field House; College Park, Maryland
February 5		Georgia Tech	W 77–68	14–5 (3–3)	Cole Field House; College Park, Maryland
February 9		at Wake Forest	L 66–79	14–6 (3–4)	Greensboro Coliseum; Greensboro, North Carolina
February 16		No. 3 North Carolina	W 106–94	15–6 (4–4)	Cole Field House; College Park, Maryland
February 19		Clemson	W 92–88	16–6 (5–4)	Cole Field House; College Park, Maryland
February 21		at Duke	W 101–90	17–6 (6–4)	Cameron Indoor Stadium; Durham, North Carolina
February 23		at Georgia Tech	L 60–70	17–7 (6–5)	Atlanta
February 26		Wake Forest	W 83–76	18–7 (7–5)	Cole Field House; College Park, Maryland
March 3		at NC State	W 67–58	19–7 (8–5)	Reynolds Coliseum; Raleigh, North Carolina
March 7		at No. 2 Virginia	L 81–83	19–8 (8–6)	University Hall (9,000); Charlottesville, Virginia
ACC Tournament
March 11*		Georgia Tech; ACC tournament Quarterfinal	L 58–64 ^{OT}	19–9	The Omni; Atlanta
NCAA Tournament
March 17*	(8 MW)	vs. (9 MW) No. 15 Chattanooga; NCAA tournament • First Round	W 52–51	20–9	The Summit; Houston
March 22*; CBS	(8 MW)	vs. (1 MW) No. 1 Houston; NCAA Tournament • Second Round	L 50–60	20–10	The Summit; Houston
*Non-conference game. ^{#}Rankings from AP poll. (#) Tournament seedings in parentheses. MW=Midwest. All times are in Eastern Time.
