= 1982–83 North Carolina Tar Heels men's basketball team =

American college basketball season

1982–83 North Carolina Tar Heels men's basketball

ACC Regular Season Co-Champions Rainbow Classic Champions

NCAA tournament, Elite Eight
- Conference: Atlantic Coast Conference

Ranking
- Coaches: No. 8
- AP: No. 8
- Record: 28–8 (12–2 ACC)
- Head coach: Dean Smith (22nd season)
- Assistant coaches: Bill Guthridge (16th season); Eddie Fogler (12th season); Roy Williams (5th season)
- Home arena: Carmichael Auditorium

1982–83 ACC men's basketball standings
	Conf.				Overall
Team	W		L	PCT	W		L	PCT
No. 8 North Carolina	12	–	2	.857	28	–	8	.778
No. 4 Virginia	12	–	2	.857	29	–	5	.853
Maryland	8	–	6	.571	20	–	10	.667
No. 16 NC State †	8	–	6	.571	26	–	10	.722
Wake Forest	7	–	7	.500	20	–	10	.667
Georgia Tech	4	–	10	.286	13	–	15	.464
Duke	3	–	11	.214	11	–	17	.393
Clemson	2	–	12	.143	11	–	20	.355
† 1983 ACC tournament winner Rankings from AP poll

The 1982–83 North Carolina Tar Heels men's basketball team represented University of North Carolina in the 1982–83 NCAA Division I men's basketball season as a member of the Atlantic Coast Conference. They finished the season 28–8 overall, tied for the ACC regular season title with a 12–2 record and made it to the Elite Eight of the 1983 NCAA Tournament. They were coached by Dean Smith in his twenty-second season as head coach of the Tar Heels. They played their home games at the Carmichael Auditorium in Chapel Hill, North Carolina.

== Roster ==
1982–83 North Carolina Tar Heels men's basketball team
Players
Coaches

Pos.	#	Name	Height	Weight	Year	Previous school	Hometown
G	4	Lynwood Robinson	6 ft 1 in (1.85 m)	—	So		Mount Olive, NC
PG	20	Cliff Morris	6 ft 3 in (1.91 m)	—	So		Durham, NC
PG	22	Buzz Peterson	6 ft 4 in (1.93 m)	—	So	Asheville	Asheville, NC
G/F	23	Michael Jordan	6 ft 6 in (1.98 m)	195 lb (88 kg)	So	Emsley A. Laney	Wilmington, NC
G	24	Jim Braddock	6 ft 2 in (1.88 m)	—	Sr	Baylor Prep	Chattanooga, TN
SG	25	Steve Hale	6 ft 4 in (1.93 m)	—	Fr		Jenks, OK
F/C	32	John Brownlee	6 ft 10 in (2.08 m)	—	So	Fort Worth, TX
F/C	41	Sam Perkins	6 ft 9 in (2.06 m)	235 lb (107 kg)	Jr	Shaker (Latham NY	Brooklyn, NY
C	42	Brad Daugherty	6 ft 11 in (2.11 m)	—	Fr	Owen	Black Mountain, NC
G/F	43	Curtis Hunter	6 ft 5 in (1.96 m)	—	Fr	Southern	Durham, NC
SF	44	Matt Doherty	6 ft 8 in (2.03 m)	—	Jr	Holy Trinity	East Meadow, NY
SF	50	Cecil Exum	6 ft 6 in (1.98 m)	—	Jr		Dudley, NC
C	51	Timo Makkonen	6 ft 11 in (2.11 m)	—	Jr		Lahti, Finland
C	54	Warren Martin	6 ft 11 in (2.11 m)	—	So		Axton, VA

Head coach

- Dean Smith (Kansas)

Assistant coach(es)

- Bill Guthridge (Kansas State)
- Eddie Fogler (North Carolina)
- Roy Williams (North Carolina)

Legend

- (C) Team captain
- (S) Suspended
- (I) Ineligible
- (W) Walk-on
- Injured
- Current redshirt

Roster

== Summary ==
Jordan frequently got into foul trouble early in his freshman year at North Carolina (1981–82). He frequently played the ends of games with four fouls.

He originally went by “Mike Jordan”, but media began using Michael in the middle of his freshman season at UNC. Late example of “Mike Jordan”: New York Times, UNC vs. St. John's, first game of 1982–83 season

PLAYER PROFILE When Jordan's shooting touch was off, he would defer to teammates and concentrate more on his defense.

Going into the 1982–83 season, UNC lost starters James Worthy, who left for the NBA after his junior year, and Jimmy Black, a senior, from the previous season's national championship team. Sophomore Michael Jordan and junior Sam Perkins missed preseason practices due to injuries, only to return at the start of the regular season. As a result, North Carolina started the season with a record of 0–2 for the first time since 1919. UNC's record went to 3–3, dropping out of the national rankings, before going on an 18-game winning streak.

=== Conference regular season ===
Taking full advantage of the 19-foot three-point line, newly adopted by the Atlantic Coast Conference and other conferences around the country, Jim Braddock made 6 of 7 three-point attempts in the opening game of conference play in an 86–69 romp over Rutgers.

January 8, 1983 - 17-year-old freshman Brad Daugherty scored 15 points and grabbed nine rebounds.

January 15, 1983 - Lynwood Robinson transferred from UNC to Olive.

January 29, 1983 - Michael Jordan scored his college career-high of 39 points against Georgia Tech, shooting 11–16 from the field, 11–13 from the free throw line and 6 of 7 from the three-point stripe including a four-point play that broke a 45–45 tie and gave UNC the lead for good. Aside from Jordan and Perkins, the rest of the Tar Heels shot 3 of 22 from the floor.

February 5, 1983 - With its win over Furman, North Carolina runs its record to 20–3, giving UNC head coach Dean Smith his record 12th straight 20-win season (a record he had previously shared with Jerry Tarkanian).

February 10, 1983 - #1 UNC won 64–63 over #3 Virginia. Both teams struggled from the field, with UNC shooting a paltry 41%. The Tar Heels managed to claw back from a 16-point second half deficit. Michael Jordan led the way with 16 points and a key steal-and-stuff with four personal fouls on him at the end of the game. Ralph Sampson of Virginia had 15 points and 12 rebounds but also six turnovers. Buzz Peterson suffered a right knee injury and is expected to be out for the season.

February 13, 1983 - With a 30–21 rebounding advantage, Villanova (#12, 17–4) snapped UNC's 18-game winning streak and became only the fourth non-ACC opponent to defeat UNC at Carmichael Auditorium, and the first to do so since 1973.

The Tar Heels suffered a three-game losing streak, partly attributable to Michael Jordan's difficulties with foul trouble.

February 27, 1983 - UNC's record against Clemson at Chapel Hill goes to 30–0 with another victory.

March 5, 1983 - In its regular season finale against Duke, UNC pounded the ball hard inside, making 57 percent of its shots from the floor, and 12 of 15 three-point baskets, in what turned into a three-point shootout. Michael Jordan scored 32 points in each game against Duke.

March 11, 1983 - UNC was led by Michael Jordan and Matt Doherty (career high 28 points) as the Tar Heels connected on 14 of 24 three-point shots to easily advance 105–79 over Clemson in the ACC Tournament.

March 12, 1983 - Michael Jordan fouled out of the close contest with 3:42 remaining in regulation. NC State got a 70–65 lead with 2:57 remaining, but did not score again, and UNC came back to tie it before the buzzer. Dereck Whittenburg carried the scoring load for the Wolfpack in overtime. Sam Perkins led North Carolina with 24 points, and Daugherty had 17 in the surprise loss.

== Schedule and results ==
Date time, TV	Rank^{#}	Opponent^{#}	Result	Record	Site (attendance) city, state
Regular season
Nov 20, 1982*	No. 3	vs. No. 19 St. John's; Tip-Off Classic	L 74–78 ^{OT}	0–1	Springfield Civic Center; Springfield, MA
Nov 27, 1982*	No. 3	vs. No. 15 Missouri	L 60–64	0–2	Checkerdome; St. Louis, MO
Nov 30, 1982	No. 15	Tulane	W 70–68	1–2	Carmichael Auditorium; Chapel Hill, NC
Dec 4, 1982*	No. 15	vs. LSU	W 47–43	2–2	East Rutherford, NJ
Dec 11, 1982*	No. 17	vs. Santa Clara	W 79–56	3–2	Greensboro Coliseum; Greensboro, NC
Dec 17, 1982*	No. 17	vs. Tulsa; Oil Capital Classic	L 74–84	3–3	Mabee Center; Tulsa, OK
Dec 18, 1982*	No. 17	vs. Texas–Rio Grande Valley; Oil Capital Classic – Consolation	W 106–50	4–3	Mabee Center; Tulsa, OK
Dec 21, 1982*		at Chattanooga	W 73–66	5–3	McKenzie Arena; Chattanooga, TN
Dec 29, 1982*		vs. Texas Tech; Rainbow Classic – Quarterfinal	W 79–47	6–3	Neal S. Blaisdell Center; Honolulu, HI
Dec 29, 1982*		vs. Oklahoma; Rainbow Classic – Semifinal	W 77–69	7–3	Neal S. Blaisdell Center; Honolulu, HI
Dec 30, 1982*		vs. No. 12 Missouri; Rainbow Classic – Championship	W 73–58	8–3	Neal S. Blaisdell Center; Honolulu, HI
Jan 5, 1983*	No. 18	vs. Rutgers	W 86–69	9–3	Greensboro Coliseum; Greensboro, NC
Jan 8, 1983*	No. 18	vs. No. 9 Syracuse	W 87–64	10–3	Charlotte Coliseum; Charlotte, NC
Jan 12, 1983	No. 11	Maryland	W 72–71	11–3 (1–0)	Carmichael Auditorium; Chapel Hill, NC
Jan 15, 1983	No. 11	at No. 2 Virginia	W 101–95	12–3 (2–0)	University Hall; Charlottesville, VA
Jan 19, 1983	No. 3	NC State; Carolina–State Game	W 99–81	13–3 (3–0)	Carmichael Auditorium; Chapel Hill, NC
Jan 22, 1983	No. 3	Duke; Rivalry	W 103–82	14–3 (4–0)	Carmichael Auditorium; Chapel Hill, NC
Jan 24, 1983	No. 3	Georgia State	W 99–55	15–3	Carmichael Auditorium; Chapel Hill, NC
Jan 27, 1983	No. 3	at No. 19 Wake Forest	W 80–78	16–3 (5–0)	Greensboro Coliseum; Greensboro, NC
Jan 29, 1983	No. 3	vs. Georgia Tech	W 72–65	17–3 (6–0)	Greensboro Coliseum; Greensboro, NC
Feb 2, 1983	No. 1	at Clemson	W 84–81	18–3 (7–0)	Littlejohn Coliseum; Clemson, SC
Feb 4, 1983	No. 1	vs. The Citadel; North-South Doubleheader	W 81–36	19–3	Charlotte Coliseum; Charlotte, NC
Feb 5, 1983	No. 1	vs. Furman; North-South Doubleheader	W 78–43	20–3	Charlotte Coliseum; Charlotte, NC
Feb 10, 1983	No. 1	No. 3 Virginia	W 64–63	21–3 (8–0)	Carmichael Auditorium; Chapel Hill, NC
Feb 13, 1983*	No. 1	No. 12 Villanova	L 53–56	21–4	Carmichael Auditorium; Chapel Hill, NC
Feb 16, 1983	No. 3	at Maryland	L 94–106	21–5 (8–1)	Cole Field House; College Park, MD
Feb 19, 1983	No. 3	at NC State	L 63–70	21–6 (8–2)	Reynolds Coliseum; Raleigh, NC
Feb 24, 1983	No. 11	Wake Forest	W 100–85	22–6 (9–2)	Carmichael Auditorium; Chapel Hill, NC
Feb 27, 1983	No. 11	Clemson	W 93–80	23–6 (10–2)	Carmichael Auditorium; Chapel Hill, NC
Mar 2, 1983	No. 8	at Georgia Tech	W 85–73	24–6 (11–2)	Omni Coliseum; Atlanta, GA
Mar 5, 1983	No. 8	at Duke; Rivalry	W 105–81	25–6 (12–2)	Cameron Indoor Stadium; Durham, NC
ACC Tournament
Mar 11, 1983*	No. 5	vs. Clemson; Quarterfinal	W 105–79	26–6	Omni Coliseum; Atlanta, GA
Mar 12, 1983*	No. 5	vs. NC State; Semifinal	L 84–91 ^{OT}	26–7	Omni Coliseum; Atlanta, GA
NCAA Tournament
Mar 19, 1983*	(2) No. 8	vs. (10) James Madison; Second Round	W 68–49	27–7	Greensboro Coliseum; Greensboro, NC
Mar 25, 1983*	(2) No. 8	vs. (3) Ohio State; East Regional semifinal	W 64–51	28–7	Carrier Dome; Syracuse, NY
Mar 27, 1983*	(2) No. 8	vs. (4) No. 18 Georgia; East Regional Final	L 77–82	28–8	Carrier Dome; Syracuse, NY
*Non-conference game. ^{#}Rankings from AP Poll. (#) Tournament seedings in parentheses. E=East Region. All times are in Eastern Time.

== Rankings ==
Ranking movements Legend: ██ Increase in ranking ██ Decrease in ranking — = Not ranked
	Week																
Poll	Pre	1	2	3	4	5	6	7	8	9	10	11	12	13	14	15	Final
AP	3	15	17	17	—	—	18	11	3	3	1	1	3	11	8	5	8
Coaches	2	2	17	16	—	—	16	11	3	3	1	1	3	11	10	6	8
