= 1982–83 Wake Forest Demon Deacons men's basketball team =

American college basketball season

1982–83 Wake Forest Demon Deacons men's basketball

National Invitation Tournament, Semifinal
- Conference: Atlantic Coast Conference
- Record: 20–12 (7–7 ACC)
- Head coach: Carl Tacy (11th season)
- Home arena: Winston-Salem Memorial Coliseum

1982–83 ACC men's basketball standings
	Conf.				Overall
Team	W		L	PCT	W		L	PCT
No. 8 North Carolina	12	–	2	.857	28	–	8	.778
No. 4 Virginia	12	–	2	.857	29	–	5	.853
Maryland	8	–	6	.571	20	–	10	.667
No. 16 NC State †	8	–	6	.571	26	–	10	.722
Wake Forest	7	–	7	.500	20	–	10	.667
Georgia Tech	4	–	10	.286	13	–	15	.464
Duke	3	–	11	.214	11	–	17	.393
Clemson	2	–	12	.143	11	–	20	.355
† 1983 ACC tournament winner Rankings from AP poll

The 1982–83 Wake Forest Demon Deacons men's basketball team represented Wake Forest University. Led by head coach Carl Tacy, the team finished the season with an overall record of 20-12 (7-7 ACC) and reached the semifinals of the 1983 National Invitation Tournament.

== Roster ==
1982–83 Wake Forest Demon Deacons men's basketball team
Players
Coaches

Pos.	#	Name	Height	Weight	Year	Hometown
G	12	Danny Young	6 ft 3 in (1.91 m)	170 lb (77 kg)	Jr	Raleigh, North Carolina
G	15	Delaney Rudd	6 ft 2 in (1.88 m)	175 lb (79 kg)	So	Hollister, North Carolina
SF	21	Kenny Green	6 ft 6 in (1.98 m)	205 lb (93 kg)	Fr	Eustis, Florida
C	55	Anthony Teachey	6 ft 9 in (2.06 m)	210 lb (95 kg)	Jr	Goldsboro, North Carolina

Head coach

- Carl Tacy (Davis & Elkins)

Assistant coach(es)

Legend

- (C) Team captain
- (S) Suspended
- (I) Ineligible
- (W) Walk-on
- Injured
- Current redshirt
