= 1982–83 Houston Cougars men's basketball team =

American college basketball season

1982–83 Houston Cougars men's basketball
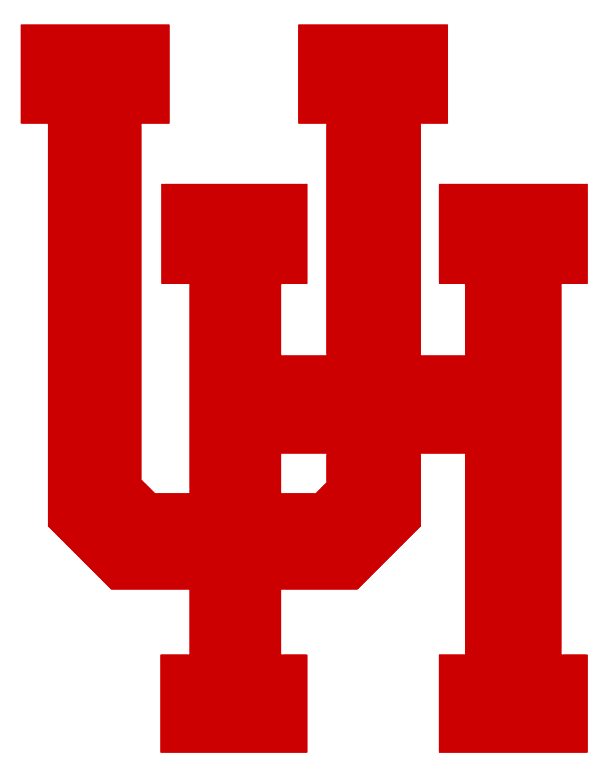

NCAA tournament, Runner-up NCAA Division I regular season champions SWC tournament champions SWC regular season champions

National Championship Game, L 52–54 vs. NC State
- Conference: Southwest Conference

Ranking
- Coaches: No. 1
- AP: No. 1
- Record: 31–3 (16–0 SWC)
- Head coach: Guy Lewis (27th season)
- Assistant coaches: Terry Kirkpatrick; Don Schverak
- Home arena: Hofheinz Pavilion

1982–83 Southwest Conference men's basketball standings
	Conf.				Overall
Team	W		L	PCT	W		L	PCT
No. 1 Houston †	16	–	0	1.000	31	–	3	.912
No. 9 Arkansas	14	–	2	.875	26	–	4	.867
Texas A&M	10	–	6	.625	17	–	14	.548
TCU	9	–	7	.563	23	–	11	.676
SMU	9	–	7	.563	19	–	11	.633
Texas Tech	7	–	9	.438	11	–	20	.355
Baylor	4	–	12	.250	12	–	16	.429
Rice	2	–	14	.125	8	–	20	.286
Texas	1	–	15	.063	6	–	22	.214
† 1983 SWC tournament winner Rankings from AP poll

The 1982–83 Houston Cougars men's basketball team represented the University of Houston. The team was led by head coach Guy Lewis, played their home games in the Hofheinz Pavilion in Houston, Texas, and was then a member of the Southwest Conference.

This was the second of Houston's famous Phi Slama Jama teams, led by Michael Young, Larry Micheaux, and future Hall of Famers Clyde Drexler and Akeem Olajuwon. The Cougars swept through the Southwest Conference schedule and were ranked #1 for the final three polls of the 1982–83 season. Riding a 26-game winning streak, they advanced to the 1983 National Championship Game, where they fell 54–52 to Jim Valvano's NC State Wolfpack. Despite the loss, Olajuwon was named Tournament MOP. To date, this remains the last time the MOP was from the losing team.

== Roster ==
1982–83 Houston Cougars men's basketball team
Players
Coaches

Pos.	#	Name	Height	Weight	Year	Previous school	Hometown
G/F	32	Benny Anders	6 ft 5 in (1.96 m)	188 lb (85 kg)	So	Bernice HS	Bernice, LA
C	50	Dan Bunce	7 ft 0 in (2.13 m)	235 lb (107 kg)	So	Conroe HS	Conroe, TX
C	52	David Bunce	6 ft 11 in (2.11 m)	225 lb (102 kg)	Sr	Conroe HS	Conroe, TX
G	14	Eric Dickens	6 ft 1 in (1.85 m)	168 lb (76 kg)	So	Madison HS	Houston, TX
F	22	Clyde Drexler	6 ft 6 in (1.98 m)	205 lb (93 kg)	Jr	Sterling HS	Houston, TX
G	20	Alvin Franklin	6 ft 2 in (1.88 m)	185 lb (84 kg)	Fr	La Marque HS	La Marque, TX
G/F	44	Reid Gettys	6 ft 6 in (1.98 m)	190 lb (86 kg)	So	Memorial HS	Houston, TX
G	10	Derek Giles	6 ft 3 in (1.91 m)	175 lb (79 kg)	Jr	Bayside HS	Queens, NY
F/C	40	Larry Micheaux	6 ft 9 in (2.06 m)	220 lb (100 kg)	Sr	Worthing HS	Houston, TX
C	34	Akeem Olajuwon	7 ft 0 in (2.13 m)	235 lb (107 kg)	So	Muslim Teachers College	Lagos, Nigeria
F	30	Gary Orsak	6 ft 7 in (2.01 m)	200 lb (91 kg)	So	Alvin HS	Alvin, TX
G	24	Dave Rose	6 ft 3 in (1.91 m)	185 lb (84 kg)	Sr	Dixie College	Houston, TX
G	12	Renaldo Thomas	6 ft 4 in (1.93 m)	215 lb (98 kg)	Fr	Roosevelt HS	Gary, IN
F	54	Bryan Williams	6 ft 7 in (2.01 m)	215 lb (98 kg)	Sr	Palisades HS	Inglewood, CA
F	42	Michael Young	6 ft 6 in (1.98 m)	210 lb (95 kg)	Jr	Yates HS	Houston, TX

Head coach

- Guy Lewis (Houston)

Assistant coach(es)

- Terry Kirkpatrick
- Don Schverak

Legend

- (C) Team captain
- (S) Suspended
- (I) Ineligible
- (W) Walk-on
- Injured
- Current redshirt

Roster
Last update: 2018-Mar-18

== Schedule and results ==
Date time, TV	Rank^{#}	Opponent^{#}	Result	Record	High points	High rebounds	High assists	Site (attendance) city, state
Regular season
Nov 26, 1982*	No. 14	Arizona; Kettle Classic	W 104–63	1–0	26 – Micheaux	16 – Micheaux	4 – Drexler	Hofheinz Pavilion (8,000); Houston, TX
Nov 27, 1982*	No. 14	Lamar; Kettle Classic	W 106–72	2–0	27 – Drexler	13 – Drexler	5 – Drexler	Hofheinz Pavilion (8,000); Houston, TX
Dec 1, 1982*	No. 11	Mississippi State	W 74–65	3–0	20 – Drexler, Young	–	–	Hofheinz Pavilion (6,800); Houston, TX
Dec 4, 1982*	No. 11	at Biscayne	W 78–59	4–0	24 – Micheaux	–	–	Unknown; Miami Gardens, FL
Dec 8, 1982*	No. 9	Auburn	W 77–65	5–0	22 – Young	12 – Olajuwon	–	Hofheinz Pavilion; Houston, TX
Dec 11, 1982*	No. 9	at Syracuse	L 87–92	5–1	28 – Drexler	12 – Drexler	5 – Gettys	Carrier Dome (19,430); Syracuse, NY
Dec 16, 1982*	No. 14	vs. No. 1 Virginia; Suntory Ball Tournament	L 63–72	5–2	–	–	–	Aoyama Gakuin University Gym (5,000); Tokyo, Japan
Dec 17, 1982*	No. 14	vs. Utah; Suntory Ball Tournament	W 82–57	6–2	30 – Olajuwon	18 – Olajuwon	–	Aoyama Gakuin University Gym (5,000); Tokyo, Japan
Dec 27, 1982*	No. 18	at Pepperdine	W 93–92	7–2	–	–	–	Firestone Fieldhouse; Malibu, CA
Jan 2, 1983*	No. 18	Pacific	W 112–58	8–2	–	–	–	Hofheinz Pavilion; Houston, TX
Jan 5, 1983	No. 19	Texas A&M	W 84–61	9–2 (1–0)	–	–	–	Hofheinz Pavilion; Houston, TX
Jan 8, 1983	No. 19	SMU	W 105–71	10–2 (2–0)	–	–	–	Hofheinz Pavilion; Houston, TX
Jan 10, 1983	No. 16	Southwestern Louisiana	W 79–78	11–2	–	–	–	Hofheinz Pavilion; Houston, TX
Jan 12, 1983	No. 16	at TCU	W 54–51	12–2 (3–0)	–	–	–	Daniel-Meyer Coliseum; Fort Worth, TX
Jan 15, 1983; 7:30 p.m.	No. 16	at Texas	W 77–52	13–2 (4–0)	–	–	–	Frank Erwin Center (6,396); Austin, TX
Jan 17, 1983	No. 14	Texas Tech	W 98–73	14–2 (5–0)	–	–	–	Hofheinz Pavilion; Houston, TX
Jan 22, 1983; 11:00 a.m.	No. 14	No. 4 Arkansas	W 75–60	15–2 (6–0)	26 – Micheaux	10 – Olajuwon	–	Hofheinz Pavilion (10,061); Houston, TX
Jan 26, 1983	No. 9	at Rice	W 76–40	16–2 (7–0)	–	–	–	Rice Gymnasium; Houston, TX
Feb 2, 1983	No. 8	Baylor	W 86–69	17–2 (8–0)	–	–	–	Hofheinz Pavilion; Houston, TX
Feb 5, 1983	No. 8	at Texas A&M	W 86–66	18–2 (9–0)	20 – Drexler, Young	11 – Young	5 – 3 tied	G. Rollie White Coliseum; College Station, TX
Feb 9, 1983	No. 6	at SMU	W 85–68	19–2 (10–0)	–	–	–	Moody Coliseum; University Park, TX
Feb 12, 1983	No. 6	TCU	W 74–66	20–2 (11–0)	–	–	–	Hofheinz Pavilion; Houston, TX
Feb 15, 1983; 7:35 p.m.	No. 4	Texas	W 106–63	21–2 (12–0)	21 – Drexler	13 – Olajuwon	11 – Gettys	Hofheinz Pavilion (7,500); Houston, TX
Feb 19, 1983	No. 4	at Texas Tech	W 84–75	22–2 (13–0)	–	–	–	Lubbock Municipal Coliseum; Lubbock, TX
Feb 26, 1983	No. 2	Rice	W 86–52	23–2 (14–0)	–	–	–	Hofheinz Pavilion; Houston, TX
Mar 3, 1983; 7:30 p.m.	No. 1	at No. 5 Arkansas	W 74–66	24–2 (15–0)	18 – Anders	12 – Micheaux	–	Barnhill Arena (9,512); Fayetteville, AR
Mar 5, 1983; NBC	No. 1	at Baylor	W 93–64	25–2 (16–0)	–	–	–	Heart O' Texas Coliseum; Waco, TX
SWC tournament
Mar 12, 1983*	(1) No. 1	(4) SMU; Semifinals	W 75–59	26–2	–	–	–	Reunion Arena; Dallas, TX
Mar 13, 1983*	(1) No. 1	(5) TCU; Championship	W 62–59	27–2	–	–	–	Reunion Arena (12,857); Dallas, TX
NCAA tournament
Mar 19, 1983*; CBS	(1 MW) No. 1	(8 MW) Maryland; Second round	W 60–50	28–2	16 – Young	8 – Drexler	7 – Gettys	The Summit; Houston, TX
Mar 25, 1983*; CBS	(1 MW) No. 1	vs. (4 MW) No. 17 Memphis State; Sweet Sixteen	W 70–63	29–2	21 – Olajuwon	7 – Drexler, Micheaux	4 – Drexler, Gettys	Kemper Arena; Kansas City, MO
Mar 27, 1983*; CBS	(1 MW) No. 1	vs. (3 MW) No. 13 Villanova; Elite Eight	W 89–71	30–2	30 – Micheaux	13 – Olajuwon	3 – 3 tied	Kemper Arena; Kansas City, MO
Apr 2, 1983*; CBS	(1 MW) No. 1	vs. (1 ME) No. 2 Louisville; Final Four	W 94–81	31–2	21 – Drexler, Olajuwon	22 – Olajuwon	6 – Drexler	The Pit (17,327); Albuquerque, NM
Apr 4, 1983*; CBS	(1 MW) No. 1	vs. (6 W) No. 16 NC State; National Championship	L 52–54	31–3	20 – Olajuwon	18 – Olajuwon	3 – Franklin	The Pit; Albuquerque, NM
*Non-conference game. ^{#}Rankings from AP Poll. (#) Tournament seedings in parentheses. MW=Midwest region. ME=Mideast region. W=West region.

== Rankings ==
Ranking movements Legend: ██ Increase in ranking ██ Decrease in ranking
	Week																	
Poll	Pre	1	2	3	4	5	6	7	8	9	10	11	12	13	14	15	16	Final
AP	14	14	11	9	14	19	18	19	16	14	9	8	6	4	2	1	1	1
Coaches	11	11	11	10	14	17	16	19	13	12	9	8	6	4	2	1	1	1

== Awards and honors ==
- Clyde Drexler, Consensus Second-Team All-American
- Akeem Olajuwon, NCAA basketball tournament Most Outstanding Player, Honorable Mention AP All-American
- Larry Micheaux, Honorable Mention AP All-American
- Michael Young, Honorable Mention AP All-American
- Guy Lewis, AP Coach of the Year

== Players drafted into the NBA ==
Year	Player	Round	Pick	NBA club
1983	Clyde Drexler	1	14	Portland Trail Blazers
1983	Larry Micheaux	2	29	Chicago Bulls
1984	Akeem Olajuwon	1	1	Houston Rockets
1984	Michael Young	1	24	Boston Celtics
1985	Reid Gettys	5	103	Chicago Bulls
1986	Alvin Franklin	4	80	Sacramento Kings
