= 1982–83 Georgia Tech Yellow Jackets men's basketball team =

American college basketball season

1982–83 Georgia Tech Yellow Jackets men's basketball
- Conference: Atlantic Coast Conference
- Record: 13-15 (4-10 ACC)
- Head coach: Bobby Cremins (2nd season)
- Assistant coaches: George Felton (2nd season); Perry Clark (1st season); Jimmy Hebron (2nd season)
- Home arena: Alexander Memorial Coliseum

1982–83 ACC men's basketball standings
	Conf.				Overall
Team	W		L	PCT	W		L	PCT
No. 8 North Carolina	12	–	2	.857	28	–	8	.778
No. 4 Virginia	12	–	2	.857	29	–	5	.853
Maryland	8	–	6	.571	20	–	10	.667
No. 16 NC State †	8	–	6	.571	26	–	10	.722
Wake Forest	7	–	7	.500	20	–	10	.667
Georgia Tech	4	–	10	.286	13	–	15	.464
Duke	3	–	11	.214	11	–	17	.393
Clemson	2	–	12	.143	11	–	20	.355
† 1983 ACC tournament winner Rankings from AP poll

The 1982-83 Georgia Tech Yellow Jackets men's basketball team represented the Georgia Institute of Technology. Led by head coach Bobby Cremins, the team finished the season with an overall record of 13-15 (4-10 ACC).

== Roster ==
1982–83 Georgia Tech Yellow Jackets men's basketball team
Players
Coaches

Pos.	#	Name	Height	Weight	Year	Hometown
C	22	John Salley	6 ft 11 in (2.11 m)	230 lb (104 kg)	Fr	Brooklyn, New York
G	25	Mark Price	6 ft 0 in (1.83 m)	170 lb (77 kg)	Fr	Enid, Oklahoma
C	54	Yvon Joseph	6 ft 11 in (2.11 m)	245 lb (111 kg)	So	Cap-Haïtien, Haiti

Head coach

- Bobby Cremins (South Carolina)

Assistant coach(es)

- George Felton (South Carolina)
- Perry Clark (Gettysburg)
- Jimmy Hebron

Legend

- (C) Team captain
- (S) Suspended
- (I) Ineligible
- (W) Walk-on
- Injured
- Current redshirt

== Schedule and results ==
Date time, TV	Rank^{#}	Opponent^{#}	Result	Record	Site city, state
Regular Season
Dec 2, 1982*		St. Francis (NY)	W 76–54	1–0	Alexander Memorial Coliseum; Atlanta, Georgia
Dec 4, 1982*		Georgia	L 67–82	1–1	The Omni; Atlanta, Georgia
Dec 18, 1982*		at Oklahoma	L 73–101	1–2	Lloyd Noble Center; Norman, Oklahoma
ACC Tournament
Mar 11, 1983*		Maryland; Quarterfinals	W 64–58 ^{OT}	9–14	The Omni; Atlanta, Georgia
Mar 12, 1983*		No. 2 Virginia; Semifinals	L 67–96	9–15	The Omni; Atlanta, Georgia
*Non-conference game. ^{#}Rankings from AP Poll. (#) Tournament seedings in parentheses.
