= 1982–83 Duke Blue Devils men's basketball team =

American college basketball season

1982–83 Duke Blue Devils men's basketball
- Conference: Atlantic Coast Conference
- Record: 11–17 (3–11 ACC)
- Head coach: Mike Krzyzewski (3rd season)
- Assistant coaches: Chuck Swenson; Bob Bender
- Home arena: Cameron Indoor Stadium

1982–83 ACC men's basketball standings
	Conf.				Overall
Team	W		L	PCT	W		L	PCT
No. 8 North Carolina	12	–	2	.857	28	–	8	.778
No. 4 Virginia	12	–	2	.857	29	–	5	.853
Maryland	8	–	6	.571	20	–	10	.667
No. 16 NC State †	8	–	6	.571	26	–	10	.722
Wake Forest	7	–	7	.500	20	–	10	.667
Georgia Tech	4	–	10	.286	13	–	15	.464
Duke	3	–	11	.214	11	–	17	.393
Clemson	2	–	12	.143	11	–	20	.355
† 1983 ACC tournament winner Rankings from AP poll

The 1982–83 Duke Blue Devils men's basketball team represented Duke University. The head coach was Mike Krzyzewski and the team finished the season with an overall record of 11–17 and did not qualify for the NCAA tournament.

== Schedule ==
Date time, TV	Rank^{#}	Opponent^{#}	Result	Record	Site city, state
Regular season
November 27, 1982*		East Carolina	W 70–65	1–0	Cameron Indoor Stadium; Durham, NC
November 29, 1982*		Appalachian State	W 73–57	2–0	Cameron Indoor Stadium; Durham, NC
December 2, 1982*		at Colorado	L 70–79	2–1	CU Events/Conference Center; Boulder, CO
December 4, 1982*		vs. California	L 71–76	2–2	Oracle Arena; Oakland, CA
December 8, 1982		No. 1 Virginia	L 91–104	2–3 (0–1)	Cameron Indoor Stadium; Durham, NC
December 11, 1982*		at Vanderbilt	L 65–74	2–4	Memorial Gymnasium; Nashville, TN
December 14, 1982*		Davidson	W 63–60	3–4	Cameron Indoor Stadium; Durham, NC
December 29, 1982*		New Hampshire	W 84–48	4–4	Cameron Indoor Stadium; Durham, NC
January 3, 1983*		George Mason	W 90–79	5–4	Cameron Indoor Stadium; Durham, NC
January 5, 1983*		Wagner	L 77–84	5–5	Cameron Indoor Stadium; Durham, NC
January 8, 1983*		at La Salle	W 61–60	6–5	Palestra; Philadelphia, PA
January 12, 1983*		No. 9 Louisville	L 76–91	6–6	Cameron Indoor Stadium; Durham, NC
January 15, 1983		at Maryland	W 86–67	7–6 (1–1)	Cole Field House; College Park, MD
January 19, 1983		Wake Forest	L 84–88	7–7 (1–2)	Cameron Indoor Stadium; Durham, NC
January 22, 1983		at No. 3 North Carolina; Rivalry	L 82–103	7–8 (1–3)	Carmichael Auditorium; Chapel Hill, NC
January 26, 1983		at NC State	L 79–94	7–9 (1–4)	Reynolds Coliseum; Raleigh, NC
January 29, 1983		Clemson	W 99–96	8–9 (2–4)	Cameron Indoor Stadium; Durham, NC
February 2, 1983		William & Mary	W 73–71	9–9	Cameron Indoor Stadium; Durham, NC
February 5, 1983		at No. 3 Virginia	L 84–105	9–10 (2–5)	University Hall; Charlottesville, VA
February 9, 1983		at Georgia Tech	L 66–67	9–11 (2–6)	Alexander Memorial Coliseum; Atlanta, GA
February 16, 1983		Stetson	W 89–80	10–11	Cameron Indoor Stadium; Durham, NC
February 19, 1983		at Wake Forest	L 104–110	10–12 (2–7)	Greensboro Coliseum; Greensboro, NC
February 21, 1983		Maryland	L 90–101	10–13 (2–8)	Cameron Indoor Stadium; Durham, NC
February 23, 1983		NC State	L 79–96	10–14 (2–9)	Cameron Indoor Stadium; Durham, NC
February 26, 1983		Georgia Tech	W 106–81	11–14 (3–9)	Cameron Indoor Stadium; Durham, NC
March 2, 1983		at Clemson	L 86–93	11–15 (3–10)	Littlejohn Coliseum; Clemson, SC
March 5, 1983		No. 8 North Carolina; Rivalry	L 81–105	11–16 (3–11)	Cameron Indoor Stadium; Durham, NC
ACC Tournament
March 11, 1983	(7)	vs. (2) No. 2 Virginia; Quarterfinals	L 66–109	11–17	Omni Coliseum; Atlanta, GA
*Non-conference game. ^{#}Rankings from AP Poll. (#) Tournament seedings in parentheses. Source: Duke media guide
