= Jim Valvano =

American basketball player, coach, and broadcaster (1946–1993)

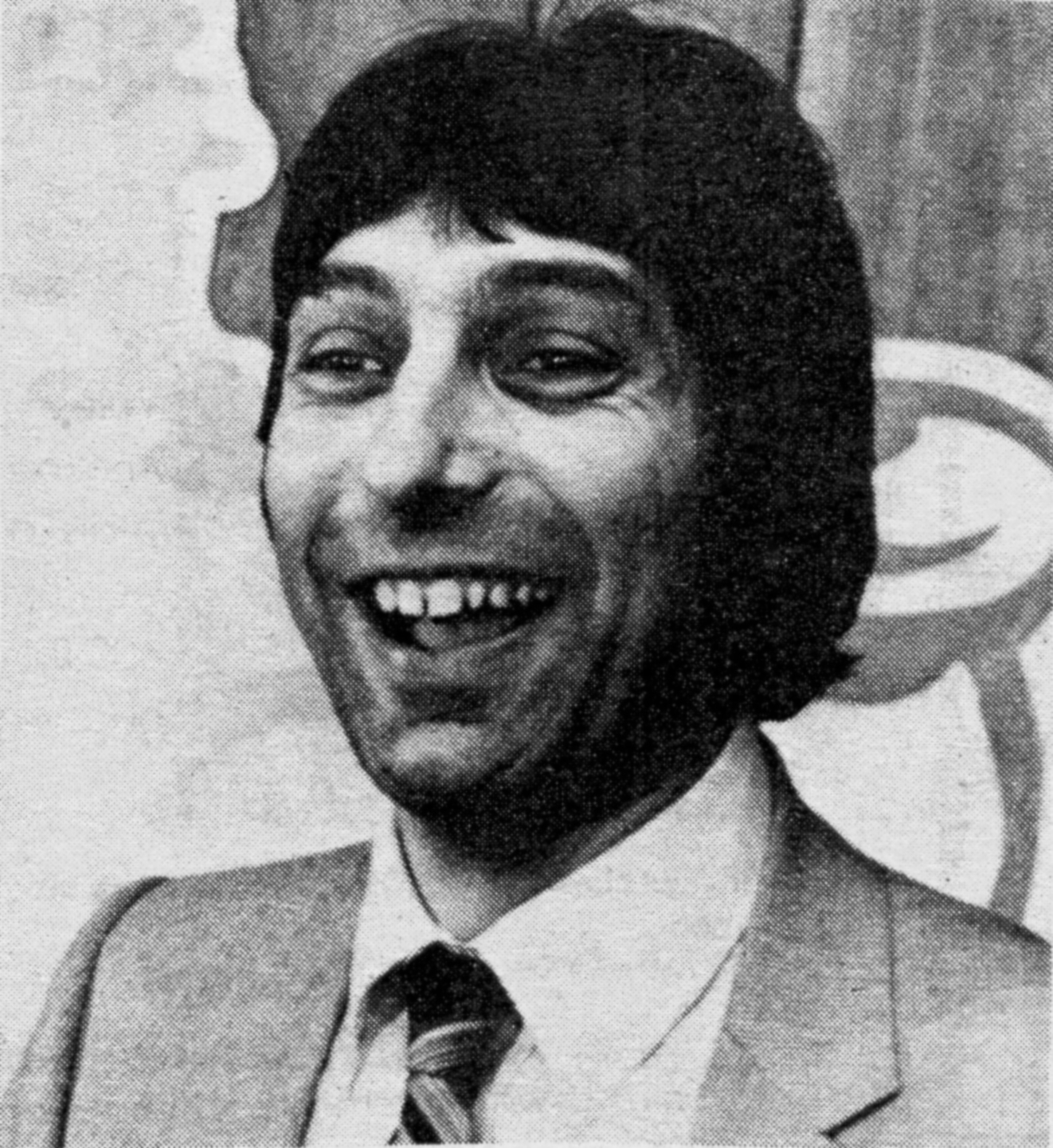
- Coach Jim Valvano in 1982

Biographical details
- Born: March 10, 1946; Queens, New York, U.S.
- Died: April 28, 1993 (aged 47); Durham, North Carolina, U.S.

Playing career
- 1964–1967: Rutgers
- Position: Point guard

Coaching career (HC unless noted)
- 1967–1969: Rutgers (assistant)
- 1969–1970: Johns Hopkins
- 1970–1972: Connecticut (assistant)
- 1972–1975: Bucknell
- 1975–1980: Iona
- 1980–1990: NC State

Administrative career (AD unless noted)
- 1977–1980: Iona
- 1986–1989: NC State

Head coaching record
- Overall: 346–210
- Tournaments: 12–8 (NCAA Division I); 0–1 (NIT)

Accomplishments and honors

Championships
- NCAA Division I tournament (1983); NCAA Division I Regional – Final Four (1983); 2 ACC tournament (1983, 1987); 2 ACC regular season (1985, 1989)

Awards
- ACC Coach of The Year (1989); Arthur Ashe Courage Award (1993); USBWA Most Courageous Award (1993)
- Basketball Hall of Fame; Inducted in 2023 (profile)

James Thomas Anthony Valvano (March 10, 1946 – April 28, 1993), nicknamed Jimmy V, was an American college basketball player, coach, and broadcaster. Valvano had a successful coaching career with multiple schools, culminating at NC State. While the head coach at NC State, his team won the 1983 NCAA Division I men's basketball title against improbable odds. Valvano is remembered for his ecstatic celebration after winning the national championship game against the heavily favored Houston Cougars.

Valvano is also remembered for an inspirational and memorable speech delivered at the 1993 ESPY Awards while terminally ill with cancer. Valvano implored the audience to laugh, think, and cry each day and announced the formation of The V Foundation for Cancer Research, whose motto would be "Don't give up. Don't ever give up". He gave the speech less than two months before his death from adenocarcinoma. The ESPY Awards have since incorporated the Jimmy V Award named in his honor. Each year, a college basketball event called the Jimmy V Classic is held in his honor and in support of cancer research.

== Early years ==
Valvano was the middle child of Rocco and Angelina Valvano and was of Italian descent. He was born in Corona, Queens, New York. Valvano was a three-sport athlete at Seaford High School in Seaford on Long Island and graduated in 1963.

Football coach Vince Lombardi was Valvano's role model. Valvano told an ESPY audience on March 4, 1993, that he took some of Lombardi's inspirational speeches from the book Commitment to Excellence and used them with his team. Valvano discussed how he planned to use Lombardi's speech to the Green Bay Packers in front of his Rutgers first-year basketball team prior to his first game as their coach. He also mentioned that he accidentally told his team to "fight for the Green Bay Packers."

== College playing career ==
Valvano was a point guard at Rutgers University in 1967, where he partnered with first-team All-American Bob Lloyd in the backcourt. Under the leadership of Valvano and Lloyd, Rutgers finished third in the 1967 National Invitation Tournament (NIT), which was the last basketball tournament held at the third Madison Square Garden. (The 1967 NCAA tournament field was just 23 teams and the NIT invited 14 teams.) He was named Senior Athlete of the Year at Rutgers in 1967, and graduated with a degree in English in 1967.

== Coaching career ==
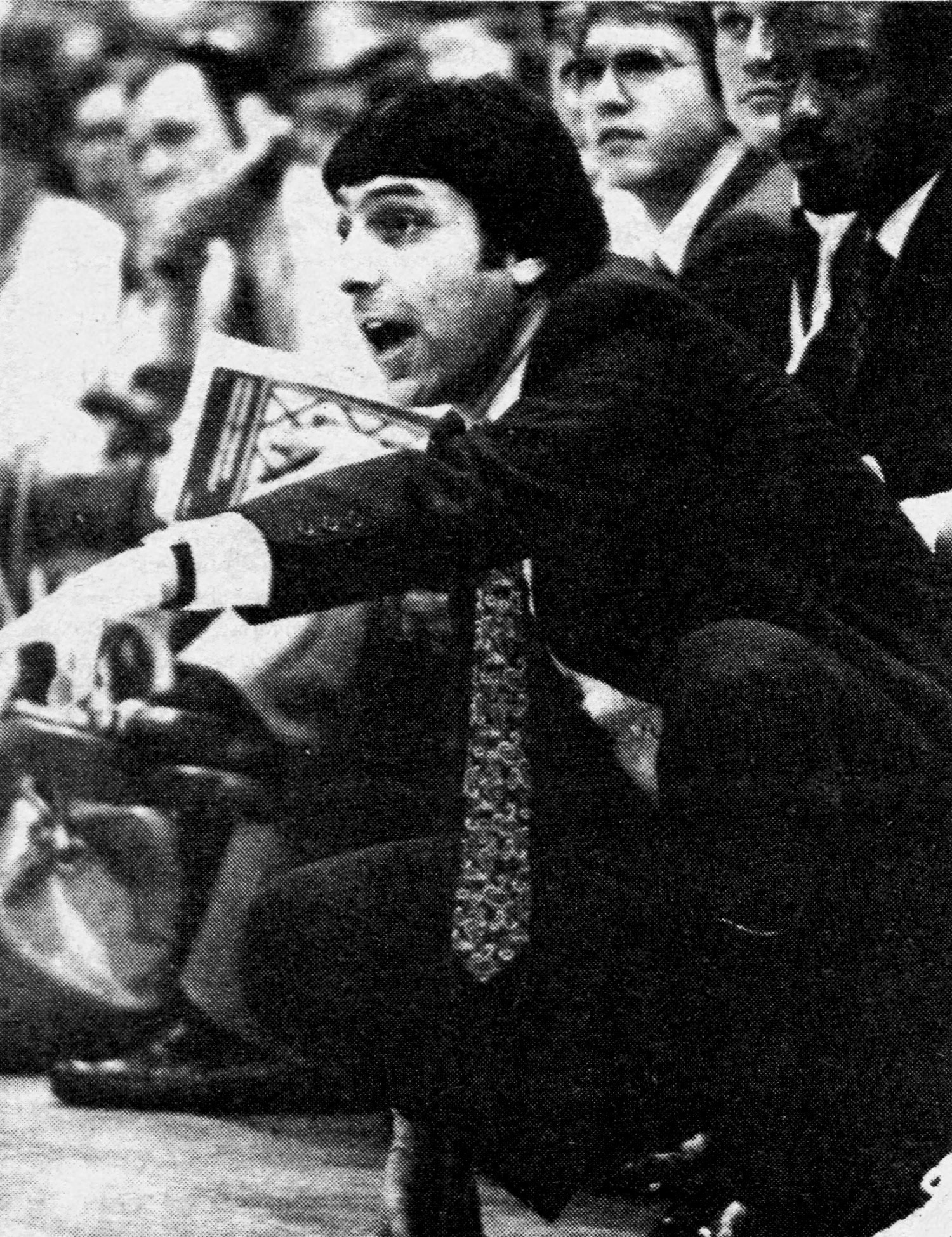
Valvano coaching NC State in 1983

Following graduation, Valvano began his coaching career at Rutgers as the freshman coach and assistant for the varsity. His 19-year career as a head basketball coach began at Johns Hopkins in Baltimore for a season; he was then an assistant at Connecticut for two years. Following that, he was the head coach at Bucknell, Iona, and North Carolina State. Valvano coached the Iona Gaels team during their highly successful 1979–80 season and a victory in the first round of the NCAA tournament, only to lose a close game to powerhouse Georgetown in the second game of the tournament. Following Norm Sloan's departure to Florida, Valvano was hired at NC State on March 27, 1980, and made his debut on November 29, when the Wolfpack defeated UNC-Wilmington 83–59. During his ten seasons at NC State, Valvano's teams were the ACC's tournament champions in 1983 and 1987 and its regular season champions in 1985 and 1989. The Wolfpack won the NCAA championship in 1983, in addition to advancing to the NCAA Elite 8 in 1985 and 1986. "Coach V" was voted ACC Coach of the Year in 1989. Valvano became NC State's athletic director in 1986. His overall record at NC State was 209–114 (.647) and his career record as a head coach was 346–210 (.622).

Valvano is most recognized for his reaction of running around on the court looking for somebody to hug in the moments after the Wolfpack victory came after the game-winning shot in the 1983 NCAA finals. Dereck Whittenburg heaved a last-second desperation shot that was caught short of the rim and dunked by Lorenzo Charles as time expired.

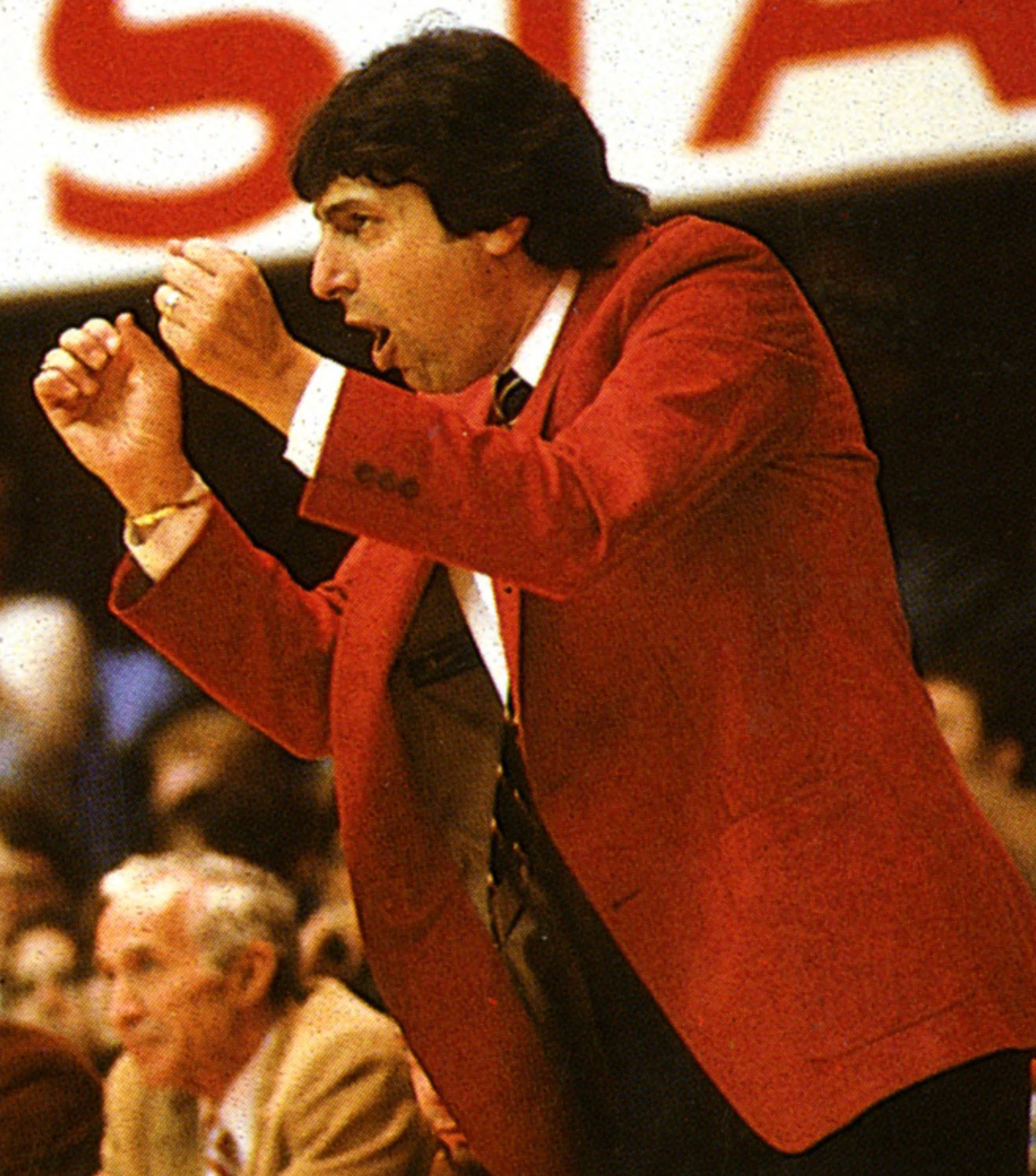
Valvano circa 1985

=== Accusations of rules violations ===
In 1989, accusations of rules violations surfaced in the book Personal Fouls by Peter Golenbock. These accusations centered mostly on high school All-American Chris Washburn, who managed only a 470 out of 1600 on his SAT (with 400 being the starting score). A 1989 NCAA investigation cleared Valvano, but found that players sold shoes and game tickets. As a result, NC State placed its basketball program on probation for two years (the maximum) and was banned from participating in the 1990 NCAA tournament. The state-appointed Poole Commission issued a 32-page report that concluded that there were no major violations of NCAA regulations, and that Valvano and his staff's inadequate oversight of players' academic progress violated "the spirit, not the letter of the law."

After this report, Valvano was forced to resign as the school's athletic director in October 1989, but remained as basketball coach through the 1989–90 season. Under subsequent pressure from the school's faculty and new chancellor, Valvano negotiated a settlement with NC State and resigned as basketball coach on April 7, 1990. Six separate entities investigated Valvano and the NC State basketball program including the NC State Faculty Senate, the North Carolina Attorney General, the University of North Carolina Board of Governors, the NC State Board of Trustees, and the NCAA. None of them found any evidence of recruiting violations or academic or financial impropriety on the part of Valvano or his staff. Dave Didion, the NCAA investigator handling Valvano's case, wrote a personal letter to Valvano, saying, among other things, "If I had a son, I would feel comfortable with you as his coach and encourage him to learn from you." A school investigation did reveal that Valvano's student-athletes did not perform well in the classroom, as only 11 of the players that he coached prior to 1988 had maintained an average of C or better.

Valvano's version of these events can be found in his 1991 autobiography, Valvano: They Gave Me a Lifetime Contract, and Then They Declared Me Dead.

== After coaching ==
After his coaching career, Valvano was a broadcaster for ESPN and ABC Sports, including a stint as a sideline reporter for the inaugural season of the World League of American Football. In 1992, Valvano won a Cable ACE Award for Commentator/Analyst for NCAA basketball broadcasts. From time to time he was paired with basketball analyst Dick Vitale, dubbed the "Killer Vees", with similar voices and exuberant styles. The two even made a cameo appearance, playing the role of professional movers (V&V Movers), on an episode of The Cosby Show.

Valvano created JTV enterprises to guide many of his entrepreneurial endeavors. He gave hundreds of motivational speeches across the country and was a featured guest on The Tonight Show Starring Johnny Carson and Late Night with David Letterman.

== Cancer diagnosis ==
In June 1992, Valvano was diagnosed with metastatic adenocarcinoma, a type of glandular cancer that can spread to the bones.

One of Valvano's most memorable motivational speeches was delivered at NC State's Reynolds Coliseum, less than 10 weeks before his death, during the 10-year commemoration of the 1983 NCAA championship. It was during this speech on February 21 that Valvano stressed the importance of hope, dreams, love, and persistence, and included his famous "Don't give up, don't ever give up" quotation.

=== ESPY Awards speech ===
Eleven days later on Thursday, March 4, 1993, he spoke at the first ESPY Awards at Madison Square Garden, presented by ESPN. While accepting the inaugural Arthur Ashe Courage and Humanitarian Award, he announced the creation of the V Foundation for Cancer Research, an organization dedicated to finding a cure for cancer. He announced that the foundation's motto would be "Don't Give Up...Don't Ever Give Up". During his speech, the teleprompter stated that he had thirty seconds left, to which Valvano responded, "That screen up there is flashing 30 seconds, like I care about that screen right now, huh? I got tumors all over my body, and I'm worried about some guy in the back going '30 seconds'". His speech included this statement:

To me, there are three things we all should do every day. We should do this every day of our lives. Number one is [to] laugh. You should laugh every day. Number two is [to] think. You should spend some time in thought. And number three is: you should have your emotions moved to tears; it could be happiness or joy. But think about it. If you laugh, you think, and you cry, that's a full day. That's a heck of a day. You do that seven days a week, you're going to have something special.

Valvano's ESPY acceptance speech became legendary. He closed by saying that "Cancer can take away all of my physical abilities. It cannot touch my mind, it cannot touch my heart, and it cannot touch my soul. And those three things are going to carry on forever. I thank you, and God bless you all." He received a standing ovation.

Valvano's hair was expected to fall out with chemotherapy treatment, but it did not. Along with his ever-positive outlook, this masked to the public how ill he was and the amount of cancer pain he was dealing with. He preemptively had his head shaved and was prepared to use a variety of whimsical wigs on his broadcasts, but his own hair remained.

=== New York Yankees ===
Valvano, a New York native, had always wanted to throw out the first pitch at Yankee Stadium. He had been given that honor for the 1993 New York Yankees home opener to be held on April 12, 1993, but he was too ill to do so. Coaching rival and friend Dean Smith, one week removed from leading North Carolina to the national championship, substituted for Valvano.

== Death ==
Valvano died at age 47 on April 28, 1993, at Duke University Medical Center in Durham, North Carolina, less than two months after his famous ESPY speech, following a nearly year-long battle with metastatic adenocarcinoma of unknown origin. He died 10 years to the month after winning the national championship in one of the biggest upsets in tournament history. He is buried in the Cedar Hill Section of Historic Oakwood Cemetery in Raleigh, North Carolina. His tombstone reads: "Take time every day to laugh, to think, to cry."

== Legacy ==
In 1983, Valvano coined the phrase "survive and advance". A 1996 television film titled Never Give Up: The Jimmy V Story, starred Anthony LaPaglia as Coach Valvano. The film was filmed in various locations including Wilmington, North Carolina, and on the campus of the University of North Carolina Wilmington.

In 1993, Valvano was inducted into the Rutgers Basketball Hall of Fame. In 1999, Valvano was inducted into both the Hall of Distinguished Alumni at Rutgers University and the New York City Basketball Hall of Fame. In 2004, Valvano was inducted into the National Italian American Sports Hall of Fame. In 2012, he was named to the first class of the NC State Athletics Hall of Fame.

On March 17, 2013, ESPN broadcast "Survive and Advance," a documentary on North Carolina State's 1983 championship run, as part of its 30 for 30 Volume II anthology series. Along with the 1983 season, it also covered the final months of his life during his battle with cancer. The documentary was first broadcast on the 30th anniversary of the Wolfpack's double overtime victory against Pepperdine in the first round of the 1983 NCAA tournament.

On March 1, 2016, a book by John Feinstein titled The Legends Club: Dean Smith, Mike Krzyzewski, Jim Valvano, and an Epic College Basketball Rivalry was released to glowing reviews. Krzyzewski arrived at Duke the same season as Valvano did at North Carolina State.

In 2018, North Carolina State University's William Neal Reynolds Coliseum was renamed James T. Valvano Arena at Renyolds Colisuem in honor of Valvano.

On August 12, 2023, Valvano was posthumously inducted into the Naismith Memorial Basketball Hall of Fame for his contributions to the game both on and off the court.

== Personal life ==
Valvano married his high school sweetheart Pam and they had three daughters. His younger brother, Bob, is a sportscaster and former basketball coach.

== Head coaching record ==
Record table
Season	Team	Overall	Conference	Standing	Postseason
Johns Hopkins Blue Jays (Middle Atlantic Conference) (1969–1970)
1969–70	Johns Hopkins	10–9			
Johns Hopkins:		10–9			
Bucknell Bison (Middle Atlantic Conference) (1972–1975)
1972–73	Bucknell	11–14	6–4	T–2nd	
1973–74	Bucknell	8–16	2–8	T–5th	
1974–75	Bucknell	14–12	4–4	T–3rd	
Bucknell:		33–42	12–16		
Iona Gaels (NCAA Division I independent) (1975–1980)
1975–76	Iona	11–15			
1976–77	Iona	15–10			
1977–78	Iona	17–10			
1978–79	Iona	23–6			NCAA Division I First Round
1979–80	Iona	28–4			NCAA Division I Second Round
Iona:		94–45			
NC State Wolfpack (Atlantic Coast Conference) (1980–1990)
1980–81	NC State	14–13	4–10	7th	
1981–82	NC State	22–10	7–7	4th	NCAA Division I First Round
1982–83	NC State	26–10	8–6	T–3rd	NCAA Division I champion
1983–84	NC State	19–14	4–10	7th	NIT First Round
1984–85	NC State	23–10	9–5	T–1st	NCAA Division I Elite Eight
1985–86	NC State	21–13	7–7	T–4th	NCAA Division I Elite Eight
1986–87	NC State	20–15	6–8	6th	NCAA Division I First Round
1987–88	NC State	24–8	10–4	2nd	NCAA Division I First Round
1988–89	NC State	22–9	10–4	1st	NCAA Division I Sweet 16
1989–90	NC State	18–12	6–8	T–5th	
NC State:		209–114	71–69		
Total:		346–210			
National champion Postseason invitational champion Conference regular season champion Conference regular season and conference tournament champion Division regular season champion Division regular season and conference tournament champion Conference tournament champion

== See also ==
- List of NCAA Division I Men's Final Four appearances by coach

== Bibliography ==
- Cairns, Bob (2005). V & Me: Everybody's Favorite Jim Valvano Story. Alexander, NC: Alexander Books. ISBN 978-1-57090-229-1.
- Cole, Marcus (Director); Greenman, Adam (Writer) (1996). Never Give Up: The Jimmy V Story (Motion picture (made for television)). Sherman Oaks, CA: Daniel H. Blatt Productions.
- ESPN (1993). ESPY Awards (Television). Bristol, CT: ESPN Original Entertainment.
- Towle, Mike (2001). I Remember Jim Valvano: Personal Reflections and Anecdotes About College Basketball's Most Exuberant Final Four Coach, As Told by the People and Players Who Knew Him. Nashville, TN: Cumberland House Publishing. ISBN 978-1-58182-219-9.
- Valvano, Bob (2001). The Gifts of Jimmy V: A Coach's Legacy. Chicago, IL: Triumph Books. ISBN 978-1-892049-30-8.
- Valvano, Jim; Kirkpatrick, Curry (1992). Valvano: They Gave Me a Lifetime Contract, and Then They Declared Me Dead. New York, NY: Pocket Books. ISBN 978-0-671-73254-7.
- Wojnarowski, Adrian (2008). Jimmy V: The Life and Death of Jim Valvano. New York, NY: Gotham Books. ISBN 978-1-59240-354-7.
