= Ernie Myers =

American basketball player

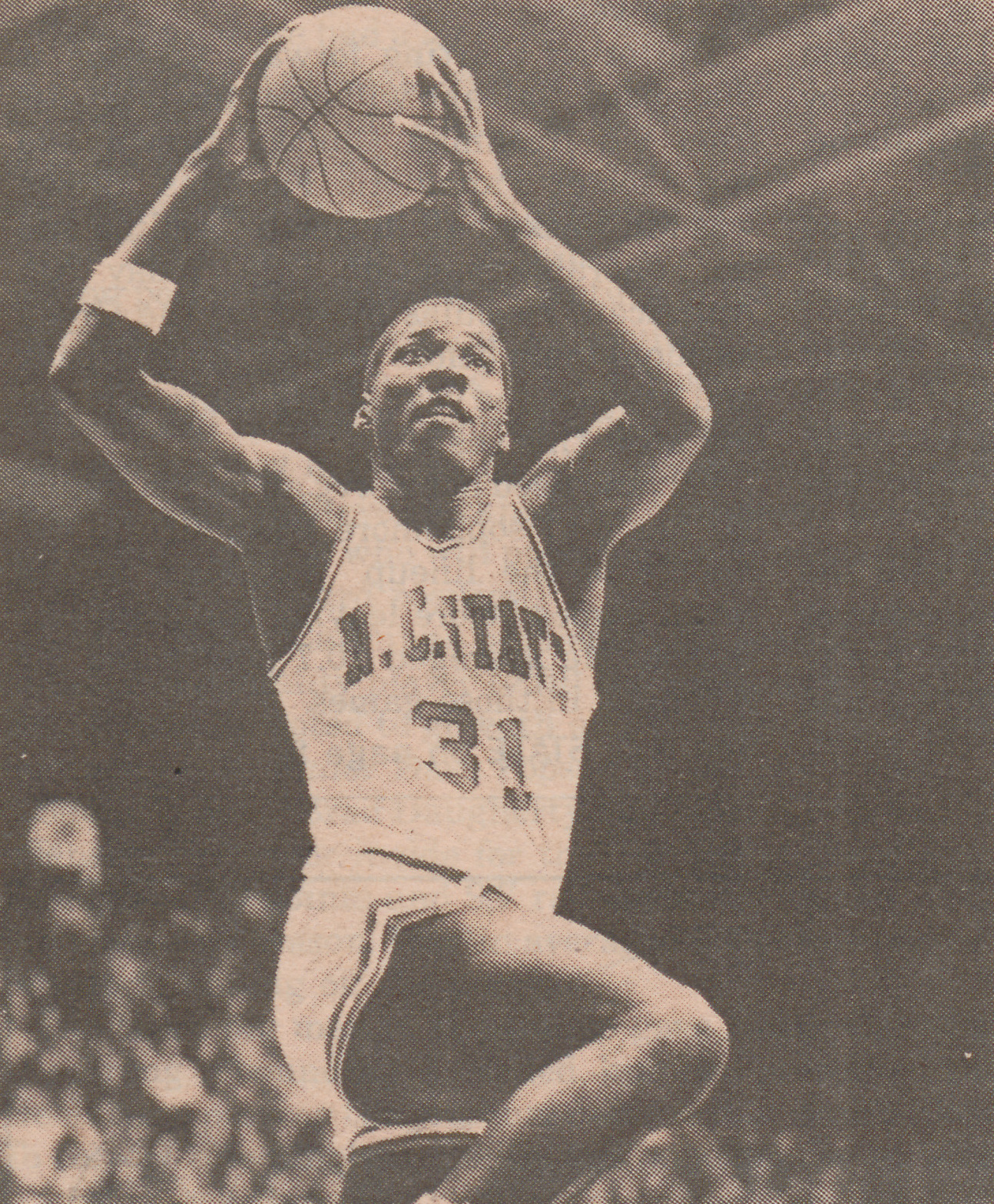
Ernie Myers captured by The Duke University Chronicle

Ernie Myers is an American former basketball player. Myers is originally from East Harlem, New York. Myers went to high school in New York at Tolentine High School. He was recruited by Jim Valvano as a sophomore in high school, while he was playing against Rice High School (Manhattan, New York).

== North Carolina State ==
Myers was the ACC freethrow champion. During this time he also played at Riverside Church. For a time, he led North Carolina State in scoring. In 1983, he was a true Freshman. He was part of the team that went 26-10. He teamed with Cozell McQueen, Terry Gannon, Alvin Battle, Lorenzo Charles, Thurl Bailey, Dereck Whittenburg and Sidney Lowe to lead North Carolina State to the National Championships in 1983.

== Personal life ==
Ernie acts as the NC State Women's Basketball radio color broadcaster. He is married to NC State's associate AD Annabelle Myers. He has two children, Ernest and Emerson.[9]
