= Sidney Lowe =

American basketball player and coach (born 1960)

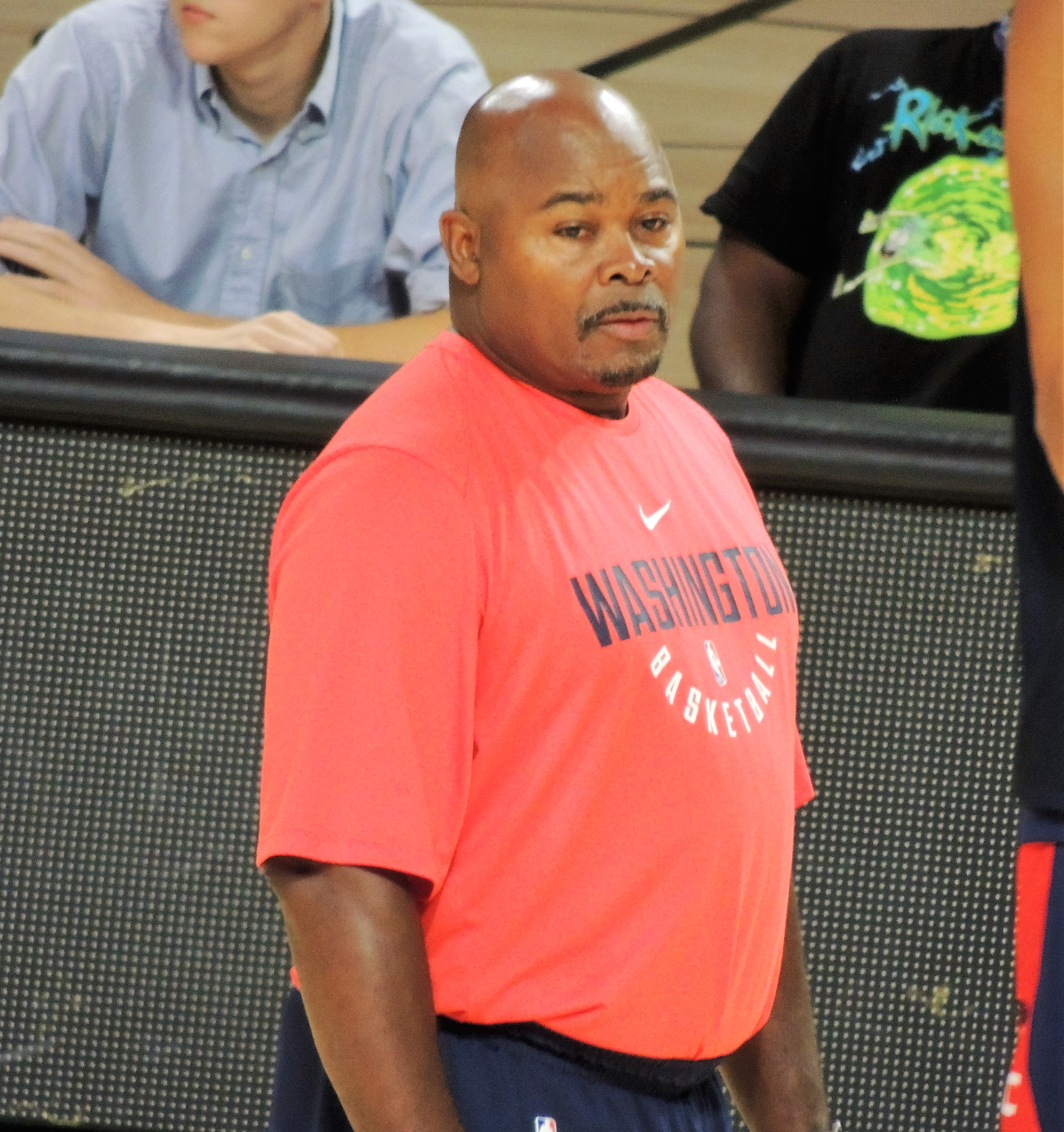
- Lowe at Washington Wizards training camp in 2017

Detroit Pistons
- Title: Assistant coach
- League: NBA

Personal information
- Born: January 21, 1960 (age 66) Washington, D.C., U.S.
- Listed height: 6 ft 0 in (1.83 m)
- Listed weight: 195 lb (88 kg)

Career information
- High school: DeMatha (Hyattsville, Maryland)
- College: NC State (1979–1983)
- NBA draft: 1983: 2nd round, 25th overall pick
- Drafted by: Chicago Bulls
- Playing career: 1983–1990
- Position: Point guard
- Number: 35, 34, 43
- Coaching career: 1991–present

Career history

Playing
- 1983–1984: Indiana Pacers
- 1984: Detroit Pistons
- 1984–1985: Atlanta Hawks
- 1985–1986: Tampa Bay Thrillers
- 1987–1988: Albany Patroons
- 1988: Calgary 88's
- 1989: Charlotte Hornets
- 1989: Rapid City Thrillers
- 1989–1990: Minnesota Timberwolves

Coaching
- 1991–1993: Minnesota Timberwolves (assistant)
- 1993–1994: Minnesota Timberwolves
- 1994–1999: Cleveland Cavaliers (assistant)
- 1999–2000: Minnesota Timberwolves (assistant)
- 2000–2002: Vancouver / Memphis Grizzlies
- 2004–2005: Minnesota Timberwolves (assistant)
- 2005–2006: Detroit Pistons (assistant)
- 2006–2011: NC State
- 2011–2014: Utah Jazz (assistant)
- 2014–2016: Minnesota Timberwolves (assistant)
- 2016–2018: Washington Wizards (assistant)
- 2018–2021: Detroit Pistons (assistant)
- 2021–2024: Cleveland Cavaliers (assistant)
- 2024–present: Detroit Pistons (assistant)

Career highlights
- 3× CBA champion (1985, 1986, 1988); CBA All-Star (1988); All-CBA First Team (1988); CBA All-Defensive Team (1988); CBA All-Defensive First Team (1986); CBA steals leader (1988); NCAA champion (1983); First-team All-ACC (1983); Second-team All-ACC (1981); No. 35 jersey honored by NC State Wolfpack; McDonald's All-American (1979)
- Stats at NBA.com
- Stats at Basketball Reference

Sidney Rochell Lowe (born January 21, 1960) is an American former basketball player and current assistant coach for the Detroit Pistons of the National Basketball Association (NBA). Lowe played college basketball and served as the head coach at North Carolina State University (NC State).

== Biography ==
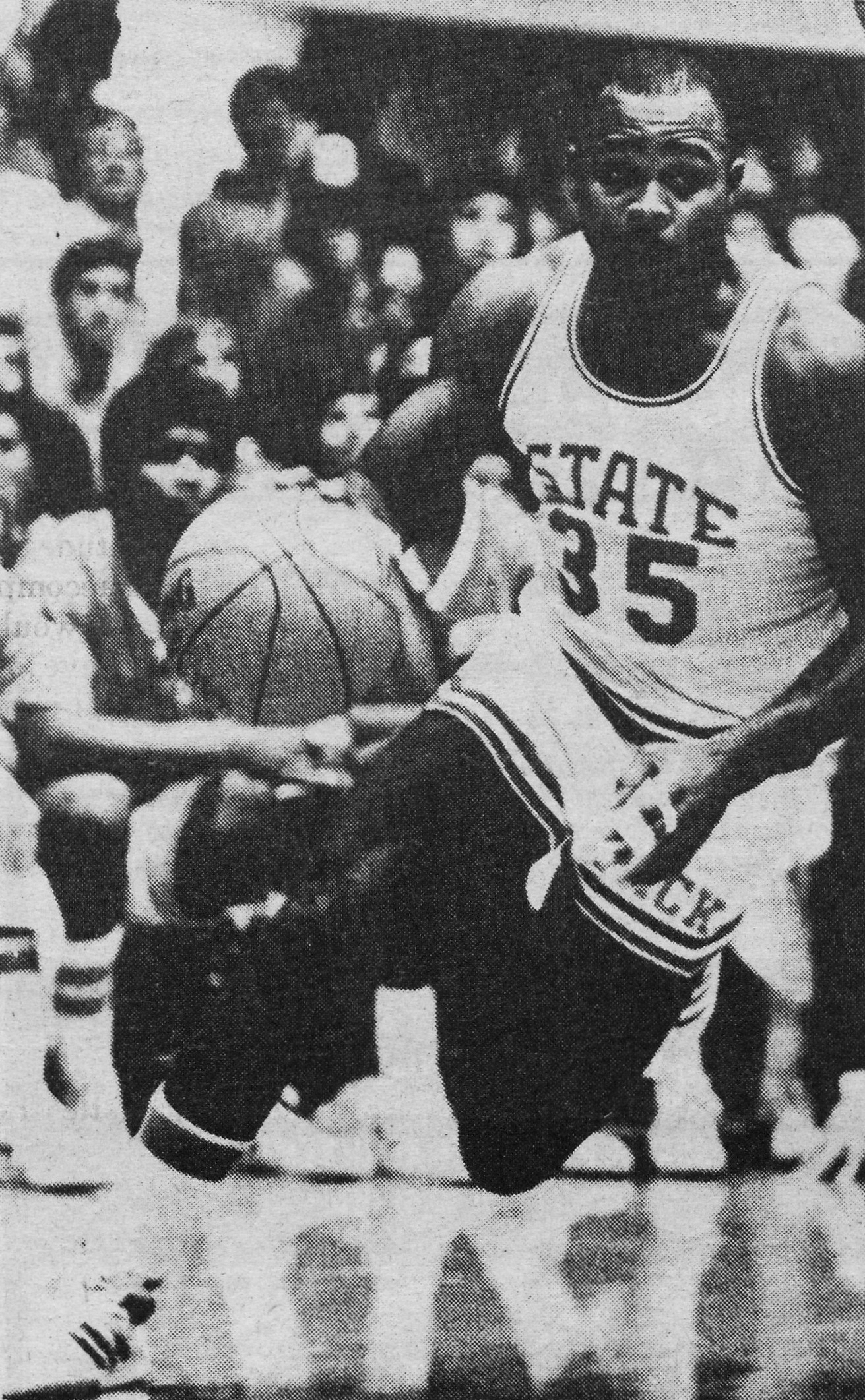
Lowe with NC State in 1983

Lowe began his career at DeMatha Catholic High School in Hyattsville, Maryland. He played collegiate basketball at NC State. He was the point guard for the Wolfpack's 1983 NCAA National Championship. Lowe was selected by the Chicago Bulls with the 1st pick of the second round in the 1983 NBA draft. He played a total of four seasons in the NBA, for five different teams. Lowe played in the Continental Basketball Association for the Tampa Bay / Rapid City Thrillers and Albany Patroons from 1984 to 1989. He won CBA championships with the Thrillers in 1985 and 1986, and the Patroons in 1988. He was selected to the All-CBA First Team in 1988, All-Defensive Team in 1988 and All-Defensive First Team in 1986. He was a CBA All-Star in 1988.

After retiring from basketball in 1991, Lowe took a job as an assistant coach with the Minnesota Timberwolves. Halfway through the 1992–93 season he took over as head coach of the struggling Timberwolves and remained in that position until the end of the 1993–94 season. From 1994 to 1999, Lowe served as an assistant coach to Mike Fratello with the Cleveland Cavaliers. Lowe returned to the Timberwolves organization in 1999 for one season as assistant coach.

The 2000–01 NBA season became Lowe's second stint as a head coach when he assumed the role for the Vancouver Grizzlies. He was the fifth head coach in the team's short history and led them to a franchise-best record of 23–59 in his first season and again the following season in 2001–02, when the Grizzlies relocated to Memphis. Sidney Lowe resigned from his coaching duties early in the 2002–03 season after starting 0–8, leaving his head coaching record at 79 wins against 228 losses (.257 winning percentage). In 2003, he returned to Minnesota once again to take an assistant position under then head coach Flip Saunders. Lowe followed Saunders to the Detroit Pistons in 2005 and remained an assistant coach there through the 2006 season.

To become eligible for employment as an NCAA head coach, he completed the final nine hours of his business administration degree online via St. Paul's College in Lawrenceville, Virginia. On May 6, 2006, Lowe was named the new head basketball coach of North Carolina State University, replacing Herb Sendek. Lowe was the first African American named head coach of the Wolfpack. One of Lowe's trademarks as a coach was a red blazer he wore to significant games in honor of his former NC State coach, Jim Valvano.

In his first season at the helm of the NC State program, Lowe became just the third Wolfpack coach, after Everett Case and Press Maravich, to win 20 games and defeat the other three North Carolina institutions in the ACC (Duke, North Carolina and Wake Forest). He is one of only four NC State coaches to have coached in the ACC Championship game in their first year.

In spite of the early success, Lowe failed to lead NC State to the NCAA tournament, and his teams only made two appearances in the NIT. He had an overall winning record (86–78) after five years but only a 25–55 conference record. Lowe resigned as head coach of NC State, accepting a buyout of the last two years of his contract, on March 15, 2011. Later that year, he joined the Utah Jazz as an assistant.

At the beginning of the 2014–15 season, Lowe rejoined the Minnesota Timberwolves as an assistant coach. On July 5, 2016, the Washington Wizards announced that Lowe had been hired as an assistant coach. Lowe was hired by the Detroit Pistons beginning the 2018–19 season.

On August 26, 2021, Lowe was hired by the Cleveland Cavaliers as an assistant coach.

== Personal life ==
In 1984, Lowe married Melonie Moultry in Winston-Salem, North Carolina. He had 20 groomsmen including Lorenzo Charles, Thurl Bailey, Dereck Whittenburg, Cozell McQueen and Clyde Austin.

== NBA playing career ==
Legend
GP	Games played	GS	Games started	MPG	Minutes per game
FG%	Field goal percentage	3P%	3-point field goal percentage	FT%	Free throw percentage
RPG	Rebounds per game	APG	Assists per game	SPG	Steals per game
BPG	Blocks per game	PPG	Points per game	**Bold**	Career high

=== Regular season ===
Year	Team	GP	GS	MPG	FG%	3P%	FT%	RPG	APG	SPG	BPG	PPG
1983–84	Indiana	78	2	15.9	.413	.111	.777	1.6	3.4	1.2	.1	4.2
1984–85	Detroit	6	0	5.2	.286	—	—	.2	1.3	.0	.0	.7
1984–85	Atlanta	15	0	10.6	.400	.000	1.000	1.0	2.8	.7	.0	1.6
1988–89	Charlotte	14	0	17.9	.320	.000	.636	2.4	6.6	1.0	.0	1.6
1989–90	Minnesota	80	38	21.8	.319	.222	.722	2.0	4.2	.9	.1	2.3
Career		193	40	17.7	.367	.133	.764	1.7	3.9	1.0	.0	2.9

== Head coaching record ==
=== NBA ===
Legend
Regular season	G	Games coached	W	Games won	L	Games lost	W–L %	Win–loss %
Playoffs	PG	Playoff games	PW	Playoff wins	PL	Playoff losses	PW–L %	Playoff win–loss %

Team	Year	G	W	L	W–L%	Finish	PG	PW	PL	PW–L%	Result
Minnesota	1992–93	53	13	40	.245	5th in Midwest	—	—	—	—	Missed playoffs
Minnesota	1993–94	82	20	62	.244	5th in Midwest	—	—	—	—	Missed playoffs
Vancouver	2000–01	82	23	59	.280	7th in Midwest	—	—	—	—	Missed playoffs
Memphis	2001–02	82	23	59	.280	7th in Midwest	—	—	—	—	Missed playoffs
Memphis	2002–03	8	0	8	.000	(resigned)	—	—	—	—	—
**Career**		307	79	228	.257		—	—	—	—	

=== College ===
Record table
Season	Team	Overall	Conference	Standing	Postseason
**NC State Wolfpack** (Atlantic Coast Conference) (2006–2011)
2006–07	NC State	20–16	5–11	T–10th	NIT Quarterfinals
2007–08	NC State	15–16	4–12	T–11th	
2008–09	NC State	16–14	6–10	10th	
2009–10	NC State	20–16	5–11	T–9th	NIT 2nd Round
2010–11	NC State	15–16	5–11	T–10th	
NC State:		86–78 (.524)	25–55 (.313)		
Total:		86–78 (.524)			
