= Cozell McQueen =

American basketball player (1962–2026)

Personal information
- Born: January 18, 1962 Paris, France
- Died: August 5, 2026 (aged 64) Raleigh, North Carolina, U.S.
- Listed height: 6 ft 11 in (2.11 m)
- Listed weight: 235 lb (107 kg)

Career information
- High school: Bennettsville (Bennettsville, South Carolina)
- College: NC State (1981–1985)
- NBA draft: 1985: 4th round, 91st overall pick
- Drafted by: Milwaukee Bucks
- Playing career: 1985–1996
- Position: Center / power forward
- Number: 40

Career history
- 1985–1986: Wisconsin Flyers
- 1986: Kansas City Sizzlers
- 1986–1987: La Crosse Catbirds
- 1987: Detroit Pistons
- 1987: La Crosse Catbirds
- 1987–1988: Tours
- 1988–1990: Paini Napoli
- 1990–1991: Philips Milano
- 1991–1992: CAI Zaragoza
- 1992–1993: Scaini Venezia
- 1994: Rochester Renegade
- 1996: Carolina Cardinals

Career highlights
- NCAA champion (1983)
- Stats at NBA.com
- Stats at Basketball Reference

Cozell McQueen Jr. (January 18, 1962 – August 5, 2026) was an American professional basketball player. He played college basketball for the NC State Wolfpack, winning the 1983 national championship.

Though he briefly played in the NBA for the Detroit Pistons, the majority of his professional career took place in the minor leagues and in Europe. He played as a center.

== College career ==
As a sophomore, McQueen took part in North Carolina State's 1983 NCAA title. He sank an off-balance shot to tie the overtime game against Pepperdine in the first round of the Tournament. In the semifinal against Georgia, McQueen – who had more playing time than usual as the Wolfpack dropped their three-guard lineup – posted a career-high 13 rebounds and added 8 points. In the final against favorites Houston, he had 12 rebounds and 4 points whilst also defending Hakeem Olajuwon as NC State earned an upset win to win the tournament.

McQueen finished his collegiate career in 1985 with 5.3 points and 6 rebounds per game on average.

== Professional career ==
McQueen was drafted by the Milwaukee Bucks in the 4th round of the 1985 NBA draft, but was waived by the Bucks a week later.

He signed with Spanish side Cacaolat Granollers the same year but was again released, having only played in the Catalan league.

McQueen then moved to the Continental Basketball Association, playing with the Wisconsin Flyers. He was signed as a free-agent by the New York Knicks in August 1986 but was released without playing a competitive game less than two months later. He then returned to play in the CBA.

He averaged 11.9 points and 10.2 rebounds for the La Crosse Catbirds in the CBA for the first half of the 1986–1987 season. McQueen was signed by the Detroit Pistons in January 1987 on a 10-day contract as an injury replacement for Rick Mahorn. Though he posted 6 points (on 3 for 3 shooting) and 8 rebounds in 7 minutes, he could not find space in a roster containing Adrian Dantley, John Salley and Dennis Rodman and left after 3 games, finishing the season with the Catbirds.

McQueen then moved abroad, returning to his birth country, France, to play for Tours in the Pro A. He had 12 points, 10.6 rebounds and 1.5 blocks in 37.3 minutes per game for 1987–88.

For the next season, he moved to the Italian Serie A, signing with Paini Napoli. He led the league in blocks with 2.1 per game in 1988–89, adding 16.3 points and 11.5 rebounds in 35.4 minutes. Joining Philips Milano in 1990, he had 10.2 points, 12.1 rebounds and 1.3 blocks in 32.7 minutes per game.

The American then signed with Spanish side CAI Zaragoza in 1991. He averaged 9 points, 11 rebounds and 1.3 blocks in 35 minutes on average in the Liga ACB during 1991–1992.

A return to Italy followed, signing a $800,000 contract with Scaini Venezia. He was replaced by Shelton Jones in February 1993 after posting 9.1 points, 10.2 rebounds and 1.2 blocks in nearly 33 minutes per game.

He finished his career in the American minor leagues, retiring in 1996.

== Death ==
McQueen died on August 5, 2026, aged 64, following a bout with brain cancer.

== Career statistics ==
Legend
GP	Games played	GS	Games started	MPG	Minutes per game
FG%	Field goal percentage	3P%	3-point field goal percentage	FT%	Free throw percentage
RPG	Rebounds per game	APG	Assists per game	SPG	Steals per game
BPG	Blocks per game	PPG	Points per game	**Bold**	Career high

=== NBA ===
==== Regular season ====
Year	Team	GP	GS	MPG	FG%	3P%	FT%	RPG	APG	SPG	BPG	PPG
1986–87	Detroit	3	0	2.3	1.000	–	–	2.7	.0	.0	.3	2.0
