= Alvin Franklin =

American basketball player (1962–2025)

Personal information
- Born: December 19, 1962 La Marque, Texas, U.S.
- Died: February 1, 2025 (aged 62)
- Listed height: 6 ft 2 in (1.88 m)
- Listed weight: 180 lb (82 kg)

Career information
- High school: La Marque (La Marque, Texas)
- College: Houston (1982–1986)
- NBA draft: 1986: 4th round, 80th overall pick
- Drafted by: Sacramento Kings
- Position: Guard
- Number: 20

Career history
- 1987–1988: Toulouse Spacer's

Career highlights
- First-team All-SWC (1986); 2× Second-team All-SWC (1984, 1985)
- Stats at Basketball Reference

Alvin Walter Franklin (December 19, 1962 – February 1, 2025) was an American college and professional basketball player. He is best known as the starting point guard for the last two Houston Cougars men's basketball Phi Slama Jama teams.
