= Lorenzo Charles =

American basketball player (1963–2011)

- Charles in 1987 wearing a Irge Desio jersey

Personal information
- Born: November 25, 1963 Brooklyn, New York, U.S.
- Died: June 27, 2011 (aged 47) Raleigh, North Carolina, U.S.
- Listed height: 6 ft 7 in (2.01 m)
- Listed weight: 225 lb (102 kg)

Career information
- High school: Brooklyn Tech (Brooklyn, New York)
- College: NC State (1981–1985)
- NBA draft: 1985: 2nd round, 41st overall pick
- Drafted by: Atlanta Hawks
- Playing career: 1985–2001
- Position: Small forward
- Number: 43

Career history
- 1985–1986: Atlanta Hawks
- 1986–1987: Arexons Cantù
- 1987–1988: Irge Desio
- 1988–1989: Quad City Thunder
- 1989: Rapid City Thrillers
- 1990–1991: Arapt Uppsala
- 1991: CB Llíria
- 1992–1993: Oyak Renault
- 1993–1994: Oklahoma City Cavalry
- 1994–1995: Cordon Atlético
- 1995–1996: Solna Vikings
- 1996: Atlanta Trojans
- 1997: Raleigh Cougars
- 1997–1998: Atenas Atletico
- 1998: Raleigh Cougars
- 1998–1999: Atenas Atletico
- 1999: Peñarol Mar del Plata
- 1999–2000: Nacional Montevideo
- 2000–2001: Fargo-Moorhead Beez

Career highlights
- NCAA champion (1983); Third-team All-American – AP (1984); 2× First-team All-ACC (1984, 1985); No. 43 jersey honored by NC State Wolfpack
- Stats at NBA.com
- Stats at Basketball Reference

Lorenzo Emile Charles (November 25, 1963 – June 27, 2011) was an American college and professional basketball player. A native of Brooklyn, New York, Charles played collegiately for the NC State Wolfpack and scored the game-winning points in the championship game of the 1983 NCAA Division I men's basketball tournament. He played briefly in the National Basketball Association (NBA) and for several professional teams in Europe. Charles died in a bus accident on June 27, 2011, at age 47.

== Basketball career ==
=== High school and college ===
Lorenzo Charles was born and raised in Starrett City, Brooklyn, New York City to Panamanian immigrants. He was a 1981 graduate of Brooklyn Technical High School and played college basketball at North Carolina State University in Raleigh. During his sophomore season with the Wolfpack, Charles scored the game-winning put-back dunk off an airball shot by Dereck Whittenburg in the final seconds of the championship game of the 1983 NCAA Tournament. The basket broke a 52–52 tie at The Pit in Albuquerque, New Mexico, as NC State scored the last eight points to defeat the top-ranked and heavily favored Houston Cougars, led by Hakeem "The Dream" Olajuwon, Clyde "The Glide" Drexler and the rest of Phi Slama Jama.

After packing on another 10 pounds (4.5 kg) of muscle, he averaged 18 points and more than eight rebounds a game in 1983–84, becoming a third-team All-American. As a senior, Charles averaged 18 points a game and grabbed more than six rebounds as NC State finished the regular season tied for first-place with a 9–5 conference record in the Atlantic Coast Conference. The Wolfpack advanced to the Elite Eight in the 1985 NCAA Tournament, but fell 69–60 in the West region finals to St. John's University, led by player of the year Chris Mullin. Charles' number 43 was honored by the NC State program in 2008, 25 years after his most-famous dunk.

=== Professional ===
Charles was the 41st selection in the 1985 NBA draft at age 21 and went on to play 36 regular season and four playoff games in the NBA with the Atlanta Hawks. He later played with several European teams, particularly in Italy for Arexons Cantù and Irge Desio.

== Death ==
Charles died at the age of 47 in a bus crash on Interstate 40 in Raleigh on June 27, 2011. He was at the controls of an Elite Coach rental bus, without passengers. Charles was interred at Oakwood Cemetery in Raleigh.

== Career statistics ==
Legend
GP	Games played	GS	Games started	MPG	Minutes per game
FG%	Field goal percentage	3P%	3-point field goal percentage	FT%	Free throw percentage
RPG	Rebounds per game	APG	Assists per game	SPG	Steals per game
BPG	Blocks per game	PPG	Points per game	**Bold**	Career high

=== NBA ===
==== Regular season ====
Year	Team	GP	GS	MPG	FG%	3P%	FT%	RPG	APG	SPG	BPG	PPG
1985–86	Atlanta	36	0	7.6	.557	–	.667	1.1	.2	.1	.2	3.4

==== Playoffs ====
Year	Team	GP	GS	MPG	FG%	3P%	FT%	RPG	APG	SPG	BPG	PPG
1986	Atlanta	4	0	3.8	.750	–	1.000	.5	.5	.0	.0	1.8
