= 1982–83 NCAA Division I men's basketball season =

Basketball season

- Preseason AP No. 1: Virginia Cavaliers
- NCAA Tournament: 1983
- Tournament dates: March 17 – April 4, 1983
- National Championship: The Pit; Albuquerque, New Mexico
- NCAA Champions: NC State Wolfpack
- Other champions: Fresno State Bulldogs (NIT)
- Player of the Year (Naismith, Wooden): Ralph Sampson, Virginia Cavaliers
- Player of the Year (Helms): Akeem Olajuwon, Houston Cougars

The 1982–83 NCAA Division I men's basketball season began in November 1982 and ended with the Final Four in Albuquerque, New Mexico on April 4, 1983. The NC State Wolfpack won their second NCAA national championship with a 54–52 victory over the No. 1-ranked and heavily favored Houston Cougars.

== Season headlines ==
- After expanding its membership from eight to ten schools, the Eastern Athletic Association, informally known as the "Eastern 8," renamed itself the Atlantic 10 Conference.
- The NCAA Tournament expanded from 48 to 52 teams.
- Jim Valvano led the NC State Wolfpack on an improbable run through the NCAA tournament. The team upset Houston's famed and high flying Phi Slama Jama in the championship game. Were it not for winning the ACC tournament, the Wolfpack likely would not have been in the NCAA Tournament.
- The Georgia Bulldogs advanced to the Final Four in the men's NCAA tournament and the Georgia Lady Bulldogs reached the Final Four of the NCAA women's tournament. It was the first time the men's and women's teams from the same school reached their respective Final Fours in the same year.
- Wayman Tisdale of Oklahoma became the first player to be named a consensus all-American during his freshman season.

== Major rule changes ==
The penalty for a player violating the five-second "closely guarded" count was changed from a jump ball to a turnover, with the defense getting the ball at the out-of-bounds spot closest to where the violation occurred.

== Season outlook ==
=== Pre-season polls ===
The top 20 from the AP and UPI (Coaches) Polls during the pre-season.

Associated Press
Ranking	Team
1	Virginia
2	Georgetown
3	North Carolina
4	Kentucky
5	Villanova
6	Memphis State
7	UCLA
8	Louisville
9	Indiana
10	Oregon State
11	Iowa
12	Alabama
13	Tennessee
14	Houston
15	Missouri
16	NC State
17	Arkansas
18	Marquette
19	St. John's
20	UNLV
20	Oklahoma

UPI Coaches
Ranking	Team
1	Virginia
2	North Carolina
3	Georgetown
4	Kentucky
5	Louisville
6	UCLA
7	Indiana
7	Villanova
9	Memphis State
10	Oregon State
11	Houston
12	Iowa
13	Alabama
14	Missouri
15	Tennessee
16	Marquette
17	DePaul
18	Oklahoma
19	St. John's
20	Arkansas

== Conference membership changes ==
School	Former conference	New conference
Alabama State Hornets	Division II independent	Southwest Athletic Conference
Brooklyn Bulldogs	Division III independent	Division I independent
Cleveland State Vikings	Division I independent	AMCU-8
Eastern Illinois Panthers	Division I independent	AMCU-8
Green Bay Phoenix	Division I independent	AMCU-8
Nicholls State Colonels	Division I independent	Trans America Athletic Conference (provisional)
North Texas State Mean Green	Division I independent	Southland Conference
Northeast Louisiana Indians	Trans America Athletic Conference	Southland Conference
Northern Iowa Panthers	Division I independent	AMCU-8
Old Dominion Monarchs	ECAC South Conference	Sun Belt Conference
Penn State Nittany Lions	Division I independent	Atlantic 10 Conference
Pittsburgh Panthers	Eastern Athletic Association (Eastern 8)	Big East Conference
Saint Joseph's Hawks	East Coast Conference	Atlantic 10 Conference
Saint Louis Billikens	Metro Conference	Midwestern City Conference
San Francisco Dons	West Coast Athletic Conference	No team
Southern Mississippi Golden Eagles	Division I independent	Metro Conference
Southwest Missouri State Bears	Division II independent	AMCU-8
Southwestern Louisiana Ragin' Cajuns	Southland Conference	Division I independent
Temple Owls	East Coast Conference	Atlantic 10 Conference
Towson State Tigers	ECAC Metro Conference	East Coast Conference
UIC Flames	Division I independent	AMCU-8
UNLV Runnin' Rebels	Division I independent	Pacific Coast Athletic Association
Valparaiso Crusaders	Division I independent	AMCU-8
West Chester Golden Rams	East Coast Conference	PSAC (D-II)
Western Illinois Leathernecks	Division I independent	AMCU-8
Western Kentucky Hilltoppers	Ohio Valley Conference	Sun Belt Conference

NOTE: Nicholls State began a two-season stint as a provisional member of the Trans America Athletic Conference, during which it played no conference games.

== Regular season ==
=== Conferences ===
==== Conference winners and tournaments ====
Conference	Regular season winner	Conference player of the year	Conference Coach of the Year	Conference tournament	Tournament venue (City)	Tournament winner
AMCU–8	Western Illinois	Joe Dykstra, Western Illinois	Jack Margenthaler, Western Illinois	No Tournament		
Atlantic 10 Conference	Rutgers (East); St. Bonaventure & West Virginia (West)	Roy Hinson, Rutgers & Greg Jones, West Virginia	Jim O'Brien, St. Bonaventure & Jim Satalin, Duquesne	1983 Atlantic 10 men's basketball tournament	The Spectrum (Philadelphia, Pennsylvania)	West Virginia
Atlantic Coast Conference	North Carolina & Virginia	Ralph Sampson, Virginia	Bobby Cremins, Georgia Tech	1983 ACC men's basketball tournament	Omni Coliseum (Atlanta, Georgia)	NC State
Big East Conference	Boston College, St. John's & Villanova	Chris Mullin, St. John's	Lou Carnesecca, St. John's	1983 Big East men's basketball tournament	Madison Square Garden (New York City, New York)	St. John's
Big Eight Conference	Missouri	Steve Stipanovich, Missouri & Wayman Tisdale, Oklahoma	Norm Stewart, Missouri	1983 Big Eight Conference men's basketball tournament	Kemper Arena (Kansas City, Missouri) (Semifinals and Finals)	Oklahoma State
Big Sky Conference	Weber State	Derrick Pope, Montana	Neil McCarthy, Weber State	1983 Big Sky Conference men's basketball tournament	Centennial Coliseum (Reno, Nevada)	Weber State
Big Ten Conference	Indiana	None Selected	Eldon Miller, Ohio State	No Tournament		
East Coast Conference	Rider (West); American, Hofstra & La Salle (East)	David Taylor, Hofstra	Dick Berg, Hofstra	1983 East Coast Conference men's basketball tournament	Kirby Sports Center (Easton, Pennsylvania)	La Salle
ECAC Metro	Robert Morris	Steve Smith, Marist	Matt Furjanic, Robert Morris	1983 ECAC Metro men's basketball tournament	John Jay Center (Moon Township, Pennsylvania)	Robert Morris
ECAC North	Boston University & New Hampshire	Jeff Cross, Maine	Gerry Friel, New Hampshire	1983 ECAC North men's basketball tournament	Case Gym (Boston, Massachusetts)	Boston University
ECAC South	William & Mary	Dan Ruland, James Madison & Carlos Yates, George Mason	Bruce Parkhill, William & Mary	1983 ECAC South men's basketball tournament	Robins Center (Richmond, Virginia)	James Madison
Ivy League	Princeton	Craig Robinson, Princeton	None selected	No Tournament		
Metro Atlantic Athletic Conference	Iona	Steve Burtt, Iona	Gordon Chiesa, Manhattan	1983 MAAC men's basketball tournament	Meadowlands Arena (East Rutherford, New Jersey)	Fordham
Metro Conference	Louisville	Rodney McCray, Louisville	Denny Crum, Louisville	1983 Metro Conference men's basketball tournament	Riverfront Coliseum (Cincinnati, Ohio)	Louisville
Mid-American Conference	Bowling Green	Ray McCallum, Ball State	Danny Nee, Ohio	1983 MAC men's basketball tournament	Anderson Arena (Bowling Green, Ohio)	Bowling Green
Mid-Eastern Athletic Conference	Howard	Joe Binion, North Carolina A&T		1983 MEAC men's basketball tournament	Greensboro Coliseum (Greensboro, North Carolina)	North Carolina A&T
Midwestern City Conference	Loyola (IL)	Mark Acres, Oral Roberts & Alfredrick Hughes, Loyola (IL)	Gene Sullivan, Loyola (IL)	1983 Midwestern City Conference men's basketball tournament	Roberts Municipal Stadium (Evansville, Indiana)	Xavier
Missouri Valley Conference	Wichita State	Antoine Carr, Wichita State	Weldon Drew, New Mexico State	1983 Missouri Valley Conference men's basketball tournament	Horton Field House (Normal, Illinois)	Illinois State
Ohio Valley Conference	Murray State	Glen Green, Murray State & Joe Jakubick, Akron	Ron Greene, Murray State	1983 Ohio Valley Conference men's basketball tournament	Racer Arena (Murray, Kentucky)	Morehead State
Pacific-10 Conference	UCLA	Kenny Fields, UCLA	George Raveling, Washington State	No Tournament		
Pacific Coast Athletic Association	UNLV	Sidney Green, UNLV	Jerry Tarkanian, UNLV	1983 Pacific Coast Athletic Association men's basketball tournament	The Forum (Inglewood, California)	UNLV
Southeastern Conference	Kentucky	Dale Ellis, Tennessee (AP) & Jeff Malone, Mississippi State (UPI)	Joe B. Hall, Kentucky & Lee Hunt, Ole Miss	1983 SEC men's basketball tournament	Birmingham–Jefferson Convention Complex (Birmingham, Alabama)	Georgia
Southern Conference	Tennessee–Chattanooga	Troy Lee Mikell, East Tennessee State	Murray Arnold, Tennessee–Chattanooga	1983 Southern Conference men's basketball tournament	Charleston Civic Center (Charleston, West Virginia)	Tennessee–Chattanooga
Southland Conference	Lamar	Karl Malone, Louisiana Tech	Andy Russo, Louisiana Tech	1983 Southland Conference men's basketball tournament	Beaumont Civic Center (Beaumont, Texas)	Lamar
Southwest Conference	Houston	Clyde Drexler, Houston & Darrell Walker, Arkansas	Guy Lewis, Houston	1983 Southwest Conference men's basketball tournament	Reunion Arena (Dallas, Texas)	Houston
Southwestern Athletic Conference	Alabama State & Texas Southern	Harry Kelly, Texas Southern	James Oliver, Alabama State	1983 SWAC men's basketball tournament		Alcorn State
Sun Belt Conference	Old Dominion & VCU	Charlie Bradley, South Florida & Calvin Duncan, VCU	J. D. Barnett, VCU	1983 Sun Belt Conference men's basketball tournament	Birmingham-Jefferson Convention Complex (Birmingham, Alabama)	UAB
Trans America Athletic Conference	Arkansas–Little Rock	Willie Jackson, Centenary	Frank Kerns, Georgia Southern	1983 TAAC men's basketball tournament	Barton Coliseum (Little Rock, Arkansas)	Georgia Southern
West Coast Athletic Conference	Pepperdine	Orlando Phillips, Pepperdine & Dane Suttle, Pepperdine	Jim Harrick, Pepperdine	No Tournament		
Western Athletic Conference	BYU, Utah & UTEP	Michael Cage, San Diego State, Devin Durrant, BYU & Pace Mannion, Utah	Don Haskins, UTEP	No Tournament		

==== Conference standings ====
1982–83 AMCU-8 Conference men's basketball standings
	Conf.				Overall
Team	W		L	PCT	W		L	PCT
Western Illinois	9	–	3	.750	20	–	11	.645
Eastern Illinois	8	–	4	.667	13	–	18	.419
Southwest Missouri State	6	–	3	.667	13	–	15	.464
UIC	7	–	4	.636	16	–	12	.571
Northern Iowa	6	–	5	.545	13	–	18	.419
Valparaiso	4	–	9	.308	13	–	15	.464
Cleveland State	1	–	4	.200	8	–	20	.286
Green Bay	2	–	11	.154	9	–	19	.321
Rankings from AP Poll

1982–83 Atlantic 10 men's basketball standings
	Conf.				Overall
Team	W		L	PCT	W		L	PCT
East
Rutgers	11	–	3	.786	23	–	8	.742
Saint Joseph's	8	–	6	.571	15	–	13	.536
Temple	5	–	9	.357	14	–	15	.483
UMass	4	–	10	.286	9	–	20	.310
Rhode Island	3	–	11	.214	9	–	19	.321
West
West Virginia †	10	–	4	.714	23	–	8	.742
St. Bonaventure	10	–	4	.714	20	–	10	.667
Penn State	9	–	5	.643	17	–	11	.607
Duquesne	6	–	8	.429	12	–	16	.429
George Washington	4	–	10	.286	14	–	15	.483
† 1983 Atlantic 10 Tournament winner Rankings from AP Poll

1982–83 ACC men's basketball standings
	Conf.				Overall
Team	W		L	PCT	W		L	PCT
No. 8 North Carolina	12	–	2	.857	28	–	8	.778
No. 4 Virginia	12	–	2	.857	29	–	5	.853
Maryland	8	–	6	.571	20	–	10	.667
No. 16 NC State †	8	–	6	.571	26	–	10	.722
Wake Forest	7	–	7	.500	20	–	10	.667
Georgia Tech	4	–	10	.286	13	–	15	.464
Duke	3	–	11	.214	11	–	17	.393
Clemson	2	–	12	.143	11	–	20	.355
† 1983 ACC tournament winner Rankings from AP poll

1982–83 Big East men's basketball standings
	Conf.				Overall
Team	W		L	PCT	W		L	PCT
No. 11 Boston College	12	–	4	.750	25	–	7	.781
No. 13 Villanova	12	–	4	.750	24	–	8	.750
No. 3 St. John's†	12	–	4	.750	28	–	5	.848
No. 20 Georgetown	11	–	5	.688	22	–	10	.688
Syracuse	9	–	7	.563	21	–	10	.677
Pittsburgh	6	–	10	.375	13	–	15	.464
Connecticut	5	–	11	.313	12	–	16	.429
Providence	4	–	12	.250	12	–	19	.387
Seton Hall	1	–	15	.063	6	–	23	.207
† 1983 Big East tournament winner Rankings from AP Poll

1982–83 Big Eight Conference men's basketball standings
	Conf.				Overall
Team	W		L	PCT	W		L	PCT
No. 10 Missouri	12	–	2	.857	26	–	8	.765
Oklahoma	10	–	4	.714	24	–	9	.727
No. 19 Oklahoma State †	9	–	5	.643	24	–	7	.774
Nebraska	9	–	5	.643	22	–	10	.688
Iowa State	5	–	9	.357	13	–	15	.464
Kansas State	4	–	10	.286	12	–	16	.429
Kansas	4	–	10	.286	13	–	16	.448
Colorado	3	–	11	.214	13	–	15	.464
† 1983 Big Eight tournament winner Rankings from AP Poll

1982–83 Big Sky Conference men's basketball standings
	Conf.				Overall
Team	W		L	PCT	W		L	PCT
Weber State †	10	–	4	.714	23	–	8	.742
Nevada	10	–	4	.714	18	–	11	.621
Montana	9	–	5	.643	21	–	8	.724
Idaho	9	–	5	.643	20	–	9	.690
Idaho State	7	–	7	.500	10	–	17	.370
Boise State	5	–	9	.357	10	–	17	.370
Northern Arizona	3	–	11	.214	10	–	16	.385
Montana State	3	–	11	.214	10	–	17	.370
† 1983 Big Sky tournament winner

1982–83 Big Ten Conference men's basketball standings
	Conf.				Overall
Team	W		L	PCT	W		L	PCT
No. 5 Indiana	13	–	5	.722	24	–	6	.800
Purdue	11	–	7	.611	21	–	9	.700
Ohio State	11	–	7	.611	20	–	10	.667
Illinois	11	–	7	.611	21	–	11	.656
Iowa	10	–	8	.556	21	–	10	.677
Minnesota	9	–	9	.500	18	–	11	.621
Michigan State	9	–	9	.500	17	–	13	.567
Northwestern	7	–	11	.389	17	–	13	.567
Michigan	6	–	12	.333	15	–	13	.536
Wisconsin	3	–	15	.167	8	–	20	.286
Rankings from AP Poll

1982–83 ECC men's basketball standings
	Conf.				Overall
Team	W		L	PCT	W		L	PCT
East
American	7	–	2	.778	20	–	10	.667
Hofstra	7	–	2	.778	18	–	9	.667
La Salle †	7	–	2	.778	18	–	14	.563
Drexel	5	–	4	.556	14	–	15	.483
Towson	2	–	7	.222	7	–	21	.250
West
Rider	10	–	3	.769	20	–	9	.690
Bucknell	8	–	5	.615	17	–	11	.607
Delaware	4	–	9	.308	11	–	14	.440
Lafayette	3	–	10	.231	7	–	21	.250
Lehigh	2	–	11	.154	10	–	16	.385
† 1983 ECC tournament winner Rankings from AP poll

1982–83 ECAC Metro men's basketball standings
	Conf.				Overall
Team	W		L	PCT	W		L	PCT
North
Long Island	11	–	3	.786	20	–	9	.690
Fairleigh Dickinson	9	–	5	.643	17	–	12	.586
St. Francis (NY)	7	–	7	.500	10	–	18	.357
Marist	7	–	7	.500	14	–	15	.483
Siena	6	–	8	.429	12	–	16	.429
Wagner	2	–	12	.143	10	–	18	.357
South
Robert Morris †	12	–	2	.857	23	–	8	.742
Saint Francis (PA)	7	–	7	.500	12	–	17	.414
Baltimore	4	–	10	.286	10	–	18	.357
Loyola (MD)	3	–	11	.214	4	–	24	.143
† 1983 ECAC Metro tournament winner Rankings from AP Poll

1982–83 ECAC North men's basketball standings
	Conf.				Overall
Team	W		L	PCT	W		L	PCT
Boston University †	8	–	2	.800	21	–	10	.677
New Hampshire	8	–	2	.800	16	–	12	.571
Holy Cross	5	–	3	.625	17	–	13	.567
Maine	6	–	4	.600	12	–	14	.462
Niagara	5	–	4	.556	11	–	18	.379
Northeastern	4	–	6	.400	13	–	15	.464
Canisius	3	–	6	.333	11	–	17	.393
Vermont	3	–	7	.300	10	–	19	.345
Colgate	0	–	8	.000	3	–	24	.111
† 1983 ECAC North tournament winner

1982–83 ECAC South men's basketball standings
	Conf.				Overall
Team	W		L	PCT	W		L	PCT
William & Mary	9	–	0	1.000	20	–	9	.690
James Madison †	6	–	3	.667	20	–	11	.645
Navy	3	–	3	.500	18	–	11	.621
George Mason	3	–	6	.333	15	–	12	.556
East Carolina	3	–	7	.300	16	–	13	.552
Richmond	2	–	7	.222	12	–	16	.429
† 1983 ECAC South tournament winner Rankings from AP Poll

1982–83 Ivy League men's basketball standings
	Conf.				Overall
Team	W		L	PCT	W		L	PCT
Princeton	12	–	2	.857	20	–	9	.690
Penn	11	–	3	.786	17	–	9	.654
Yale	7	–	7	.500	12	–	14	.462
Columbia	7	–	7	.500	10	–	16	.385
Cornell	6	–	8	.429	10	–	16	.385
Brown	6	–	8	.429	9	–	17	.346
Harvard	4	–	10	.286	12	–	14	.462
Dartmouth	3	–	11	.214	7	–	19	.269
Rankings from AP Poll

1982–83 Metro Conference men's basketball standings
	Conf.				Overall
Team	W		L	PCT	W		L	PCT
No. 2 Louisville †	12	–	0	1.000	32	–	4	.889
Virginia Tech	7	–	5	.583	23	–	11	.676
Tulane	7	–	5	.583	19	–	12	.613
No. 17 Memphis State	6	–	6	.500	23	–	8	.742
Florida State	5	–	7	.417	14	–	14	.500
Southern Miss	3	–	9	.250	14	–	14	.500
Cincinnati	1	–	11	.083	11	–	17	.393
† 1983 Metro Conference tournament winner Rankings from AP Poll

1982–83 MAAC men's basketball standings
	Conf.				Overall
Team	W		L	PCT	W		L	PCT
Iona	8	–	2	.800	22	–	9	.710
Fordham †	7	–	3	.700	19	–	11	.633
Saint Peter's	7	–	3	.700	22	–	5	.815
Manhattan	4	–	6	.400	15	–	13	.536
Army	2	–	8	.200	11	–	18	.379
Fairfield	2	–	8	.200	13	–	15	.464
† 1983 MAAC tournament winner Rankings from AP Poll

1982–83 Mid-American Conference men's basketball standings
	Conf.				Overall
Team	W		L	PCT	W		L	PCT
Bowling Green	15	–	3	.833	21	–	9	.700
Ohio†	12	–	6	.667	23	–	9	.719
Toledo	10	–	8	.556	17	–	12	.586
Ball State	10	–	8	.556	17	–	12	.586
Miami	10	–	8	.556	13	–	15	.464
Kent State	9	–	9	.500	15	–	13	.536
Eastern Michigan	8	–	10	.444	12	–	16	.429
Northern Illinois	8	–	10	.444	11	–	16	.407
Central Michigan	5	–	13	.278	10	–	17	.370
Western Michigan	3	–	15	.167	5	–	23	.179
† Mid-American Conference tournament winner Rankings from AP Poll

1982–83 MEAC men's basketball standings
	Conf.				Overall
Team	W		L	PCT	W		L	PCT
Howard	11	–	1	.917	18	–	8	.692
North Carolina A&T †	9	–	3	.750	23	–	8	.742
South Carolina State	5	–	7	.417	13	–	15	.464
Maryland Eastern Shore	5	–	7	.417	10	–	19	.345
Delaware State	5	–	7	.417	8	–	19	.296
Florida A&M	4	–	8	.333	7	–	21	.250
Bethune–Cookman	3	–	9	.250	5	–	21	.192
† 1983 MEAC tournament winner Rankings from AP Poll

1982–83 Midwestern City Conference men's basketball standings
	Conf.				Overall
Team	W		L	PCT	W		L	PCT
Loyola-Chicago	12	–	2	.857	19	–	10	.655
Xavier †	10	–	4	.714	22	–	8	.733
Oral Roberts	10	–	4	.714	14	–	14	.500
Butler	9	–	5	.643	15	–	13	.536
Evansville	6	–	8	.429	13	–	16	.448
Detroit	6	–	8	.429	12	–	17	.414
Saint Louis	2	–	12	.143	5	–	23	.179
Oklahoma City	1	–	13	.071	4	–	22	.154
† 1983 MCC tournament winner

1982–83 Missouri Valley Conference men's basketball standings
	Conf.				Overall
Team	W		L	PCT	W		L	PCT
No. 14 Wichita State	17	–	1	.944	25	–	3	.893
Illinois State †	13	–	5	.722	24	–	7	.774
New Mexico State	11	–	7	.611	18	–	11	.621
Tulsa	11	–	7	.611	19	–	12	.613
Bradley	10	–	8	.556	16	–	13	.552
Drake	9	–	9	.500	13	–	15	.464
Indiana State	5	–	13	.278	9	–	19	.321
West Texas State	5	–	13	.278	8	–	20	.286
Southern Illinois	5	–	13	.278	9	–	19	.321
Creighton	4	–	14	.222	8	–	19	.296
† 1983 MVC tournament winner Rankings from AP Poll

1982–83 Ohio Valley Conference men's basketball standings
	Conf.				Overall
Team	W		L	PCT	W		L	PCT
Murray State	11	–	3	.786	21	–	8	.724
Morehead State †	10	–	4	.714	19	–	11	.633
Tennessee Tech	9	–	5	.643	16	–	12	.571
Akron	7	–	7	.500	14	–	15	.483
Eastern Kentucky	7	–	7	.500	10	–	17	.370
Youngstown State	5	–	9	.357	15	–	12	.556
Austin Peay	4	–	10	.286	11	–	16	.407
Middle Tennessee	3	–	11	.214	7	–	20	.259
† OVC tournament winner Rankings from AP Poll

1982–83 Pacific Coast Athletic Association men's basketball standings
	Conf.				Overall
Team	W		L	PCT	W		L	PCT
No. 6 UNLV †	15	–	1	.938	28	–	3	.903
Cal State Fullerton	12	–	4	.750	21	–	8	.724
Utah State	10	–	6	.625	20	–	9	.690
Fresno State	9	–	7	.563	25	–	10	.714
UC Irvine	8	–	8	.500	16	–	12	.571
San Jose State	7	–	9	.438	14	–	15	.483
Long Beach State	6	–	10	.375	13	–	16	.448
Pacific	4	–	12	.250	7	–	21	.250
UC Santa Barbara	1	–	15	.063	7	–	20	.259
† 1983 PCAA tournament winner

1982–83 Pacific-10 Conference men's basketball standings
	Conf.				Overall
Team	W		L	PCT	W		L	PCT
No. 7 UCLA	15	–	3	.833	23	–	6	.793
Washington State	14	–	4	.778	23	–	7	.767
Oregon State	12	–	6	.667	20	–	11	.645
Arizona State	12	–	6	.667	19	–	14	.576
USC	11	–	7	.611	17	–	11	.607
Washington	7	–	11	.389	16	–	15	.516
California	7	–	11	.389	14	–	14	.500
Stanford	6	–	12	.333	14	–	14	.500
Oregon	5	–	13	.278	9	–	18	.333
Arizona	1	–	17	.056	4	–	24	.143
As of April 15, 1983; Rankings from AP Poll

1982–83 Southeastern Conference men's basketball standings
	Conf.				Overall
Team	W		L	PCT	W		L	PCT
No. 12 Kentucky	13	–	5	.722	23	–	8	.742
LSU	10	–	8	.556	19	–	13	.594
Ole Miss	10	–	8	.556	19	–	12	.613
Vanderbilt	9	–	9	.500	19	–	14	.576
Mississippi State	9	–	9	.500	17	–	12	.586
No. 18 Georgia †	9	–	9	.500	24	–	10	.706
Tennessee	9	–	9	.500	20	–	12	.625
Auburn	8	–	10	.444	15	–	13	.536
Alabama	8	–	10	.444	20	–	12	.625
Florida	5	–	13	.278	13	–	18	.419
† 1983 SEC tournament winner Rankings from AP Poll

1982–83 Southern Conference men's basketball standings
	Conf.				Overall
Team	W		L	PCT	W		L	PCT
No. 15 Chattanooga †	15	–	1	.938	26	–	4	.867
Marshall	13	–	3	.813	20	–	8	.714
East Tennessee State	12	–	4	.750	22	–	9	.710
Western Carolina	9	–	7	.563	17	–	12	.586
Davidson	8	–	8	.500	13	–	15	.464
The Citadel	7	–	9	.438	12	–	16	.429
Furman	4	–	12	.250	9	–	20	.310
Appalachian State	3	–	13	.188	6	–	21	.222
VMI	1	–	15	.063	2	–	25	.074
† 1983 Southern tournament winner As of April 30, 1983; Rankings from AP poll

1982–83 Southland Conference men's basketball standings
	Conf.				Overall
Team	W		L	PCT	W		L	PCT
Lamar †	9	–	3	.750	23	–	8	.742
Louisiana Tech	8	–	4	.667	19	–	9	.679
McNeese State	6	–	6	.500	16	–	13	.552
Northeast Louisiana	6	–	6	.500	14	–	14	.500
Arkansas State	5	–	7	.417	17	–	12	.586
North Texas State	5	–	7	.417	15	–	15	.500
Texas-Arlington	3	–	9	.250	9	–	19	.321
† 1983 Southland tournament winner Rankings from AP poll

1982–83 Southwest Conference men's basketball standings
	Conf.				Overall
Team	W		L	PCT	W		L	PCT
No. 1 Houston †	16	–	0	1.000	31	–	3	.912
No. 9 Arkansas	14	–	2	.875	26	–	4	.867
Texas A&M	10	–	6	.625	17	–	14	.548
TCU	9	–	7	.563	23	–	11	.676
SMU	9	–	7	.563	19	–	11	.633
Texas Tech	7	–	9	.438	11	–	20	.355
Baylor	4	–	12	.250	12	–	16	.429
Rice	2	–	14	.125	8	–	20	.286
Texas	1	–	15	.063	6	–	22	.214
† 1983 SWC tournament winner Rankings from AP poll

1982–83 SWAC men's basketball standings
	Conf.				Overall
Team	W		L	PCT	W		L	PCT
Texas Southern	12	–	2	.857	22	–	7	.759
Alabama State	12	–	2	.857	22	–	6	.786
Alcorn State †	10	–	4	.714	22	–	10	.688
Southern	7	–	7	.500	16	–	14	.533
Mississippi Valley State	6	–	8	.429	11	–	17	.393
Jackson State	4	–	10	.286	6	–	24	.200
Grambling State	3	–	11	.214	6	–	22	.214
Prairie View A&M	2	–	12	.143	4	–	22	.154
† 1983 SWAC tournament winner Rankings from AP Poll

1982–83 Sun Belt Conference men's basketball standings
	Conf.				Overall
Team	W		L	PCT	W		L	PCT
Old Dominion	12	–	2	.857	19	–	10	.655
VCU	12	–	2	.857	24	–	7	.774
UAB †	9	–	5	.643	19	–	14	.576
South Florida	8	–	6	.571	22	–	10	.688
South Alabama	6	–	8	.429	16	–	12	.571
UNC Charlotte	5	–	9	.357	8	–	20	.286
Western Kentucky	4	–	10	.286	12	–	16	.429
Jacksonville	0	–	14	.000	7	–	22	.241
† 1983 Sun Belt Conference tournament winner Rankings from AP Poll

1982–83 Trans America Athletic Conference men's basketball standings
	Conf.				Overall
Team	W		L	PCT	W		L	PCT
Arkansas–Little Rock	12	–	2	.857	23	–	6	.793
Houston Baptist	10	–	4	.714	20	–	9	.690
Georgia Southern †	8	–	6	.571	18	–	12	.600
Centenary	8	–	6	.571	16	–	13	.552
Mercer	6	–	8	.429	13	–	15	.464
Samford	6	–	8	.429	13	–	15	.464
Northwestern State	5	–	9	.357	9	–	19	.321
Hardin–Simmons	1	–	13	.071	3	–	25	.107
Nicholls State*	0	–	0	–	16	–	12	.571
† 1983 TAAC tournament winner *Provisional member; played no conference games. Rankings from AP Poll

1982–83 West Coast Athletic Conference men's basketball standings
	Conf.				Overall
Team	W		L	PCT	W		L	PCT
Pepperdine	10	–	2	.833	20	–	9	.690
Santa Clara	9	–	3	.750	21	–	7	.750
Saint Mary's	7	–	5	.583	14	–	12	.538
San Diego	5	–	7	.417	11	–	15	.423
Gonzaga	5	–	7	.417	13	–	14	.481
Portland	4	–	8	.333	10	–	18	.357
Loyola Marymount	2	–	10	.167	9	–	18	.333
Rankings from AP Poll

1982–83 WAC men's basketball standings
	Conf.				Overall
Team	W		L	PCT	W		L	PCT
UTEP	11	–	5	.688	19	–	10	.655
Utah	11	–	5	.688	18	–	14	.563
BYU	11	–	5	.688	15	–	14	.517
Hawaii	9	–	7	.563	17	–	11	.607
San Diego State	8	–	8	.500	18	–	10	.643
Wyoming	8	–	8	.500	16	–	13	.552
New Mexico	6	–	10	.375	14	–	15	.483
Colorado State	6	–	10	.375	11	–	17	.393
Air Force	2	–	14	.125	10	–	17	.370
Rankings from AP Poll

=== Division I independents ===
A total of 19 college teams played as Division I independents. Among them, New Orleans (23–7) had both the best winning percentage (.767) and the most wins.

1982–83 NCAA Division I men's basketball independents standings
	Conf.				Overall
Team	W		L	PCT	W		L	PCT
New Orleans		–		–	23	–	7	.767
Southwestern Louisiana		–		–	22	–	7	.759
South Carolina		–		–	22	–	9	.710
Stetson		–		–	19	–	9	.679
Southeastern Louisiana		–		–	18	–	9	.667
Marquette		–		–	19	–	10	.655
Notre Dame		–		–	19	–	10	.655
Dayton		–		–	18	–	10	.643
DePaul		–		–	21	–	12	.636
Baptist		–		–	13	–	14	.481
Utica		–		–	11	–	15	.423
Tennessee State		–		–	11	–	16	.407
UNC Wilmington		–		–	11	–	16	.407
Brooklyn		–		–	11	–	17	.393
Campbell		–		–	11	–	17	.393
UTSA		–		–	10	–	17	.370
Georgia State		–		–	9	–	19	.321
Texas–Pan American		–		–	7	–	21	.250
U.S. International		–		–	3	–	25	.107
Rankings from AP Poll

=== Informal championships ===
Conference	Regular season winner	Most Valuable Player
Philadelphia Big 5	Villanova	John Pinone, Villanova

Villanova finished with a 3–1 record in head-to-head competition among the Philadelphia Big 5.

=== Statistical leaders ===
Points per game			Rebounds per game			Field goal percentage			Free throw percentage		
Player	School	PPG	Player	School	RPG	Player	School	FG%	Player	School	FT%
Harry Kelly	Texas Southern	28.8	Xavier McDaniel	Wichita St.	14.4	Troy Lee Mikell	E. Tennessee St.	67.5	Rob Gonzalez	Colorado	91.5
Jeff Malone	Mississippi St.	26.8	Franklin Giles	S. Carolina St.	12.9	Orlando Phillips	Pepperdine	66.0	Charles Fisher	James Madison	91.3
Carlos Yates	George Mason	26.8	Michael Cage	San Diego St.	12.6	Eugene McDowell	Florida	64.6	Mike Waitkus	Brown	89.8
Charlie Bradley	S. Florida	26.7	Mark Halsel	Northeastern	12.5	Charles Barkley	Auburn	64.4	Phil Cox	Vanderbilt	89.7
Joe Jakubick	Akron	26.7	Jeff Cross	Maine	11.9	Tommy Best	Saint Peter's	64.2	William Hobdy	Grambling St.	89.7
			Sidney Green	UNLV	11.9						

== Postseason tournaments ==
=== NCAA tournament ===
==== Final Four - The Pit, Albuquerque, New Mexico ====
National semifinals
E4	Georgia	60
W6	NC State	67
ME1	Louisville	81
MW1	Houston	94

National championship game
W6	NC State	54
MW1	Houston	52

=== National Invitation tournament ===
==== NIT Semifinals and Final ====
Semifinals
Wake Forest	62
Fresno State	86
Nebraska	58
DePaul	68

Final
Fresno State	69
DePaul	60

== Award winners ==
=== Consensus All-American teams ===
Consensus First Team
Player	Position	Class	Team
Dale Ellis	F	Senior	Tennessee
Patrick Ewing	C	Sophomore	Georgetown
Michael Jordan	G	Sophomore	North Carolina
Keith Lee	F/C	Sophomore	Memphis State
Sam Perkins	F	Junior	North Carolina
Ralph Sampson	C	Senior	Virginia
Wayman Tisdale	F	Freshman	Oklahoma

Consensus Second Team
Player	Position	Class	Team
Clyde Drexler	G/F	Junior	Houston
Sidney Green	F/C	Senior	UNLV
John Paxson	G	Senior	Notre Dame
Steve Stipanovich	C	Senior	Missouri
Jon Sundvold	G	Senior	Missouri
Darrell Walker	G	Senior	Arkansas
Randy Wittman	F/G	Senior	Indiana

=== Major player of the year awards ===
- Wooden Award: Ralph Sampson, Virginia
- Naismith Award: Ralph Sampson, Virginia
- Helms Player of the Year: Akeem Olajuwon, Houston
- Associated Press Player of the Year: Ralph Sampson, Virginia
- UPI Player of the Year: Ralph Sampson, Virginia
- NABC Player of the Year: Ralph Sampson, Virginia
- Oscar Robertson Trophy (USBWA): Ralph Sampson, Virginia
- Adolph Rupp Trophy: Ralph Sampson, Virginia
- Sporting News Player of the Year: Michael Jordan, North Carolina

=== Major coach of the year awards ===
- Associated Press Coach of the Year: Guy Lewis, Houston
- UPI Coach of the Year: Jerry Tarkanian, UNLV
- Henry Iba Award (USBWA): Lou Carnesecca, St. John's
- NABC Coach of the Year: Lou Carnesecca, St. John's
- CBS/Chevrolet Coach of the Year: Lou Carnesecca, St. John's
- Sporting News Coach of the Year: Denny Crum, Louisville

=== Other major awards ===
- Frances Pomeroy Naismith Award (Best player under 6'0): Ray McCallum, Ball State
- Robert V. Geasey Trophy (Top player in Philadelphia Big 5): John Pinone, Villanova
- NIT/Haggerty Award (Top player in New York City metro area): Chris Mullin, St. John's

== Coaching changes ==
A number of teams changed coaches during the season and after it ended.

Team	Former Coach	Interim Coach	New Coach	Reason
Arizona	Ben Lindsey		Lute Olson	
Austin Peay	Ron Bargatze		Howard Johnson	
Baptist	Phil Carter		Tommy Gaither	
Boise State	Dave Leach		Bobby Dye	
Boston University	Rick Pitino		John Kuester	Pitino left to join the New York Knicks coach staff. Kuester, an assistant under Pitino, took over head coaching duties.
BYU	Frank Arnold		Ladell Anderson	
Campbell	Danny Roberts		Jerry Smith	
Cincinnati	Ed Badger		Tony Yates	Badger left to join the Cleveland Cavaliers coaching staff.
Cleveland State	Ray Dieringer		Kevin Mackey	Mackey was hired from the Boston College coaching staff.
Dartmouth	Tim Cohane		Reggie Minton	Minton was hired from the Air Force coaching staff.
Florida A&M	James Giles		Anthony Fields	
Georgia State	Jim Jarrett		Tom Pugliese	
Hardin–Simmons	Jim Hatfield		Dick Danford	
Kansas	Ted Owens		Larry Brown	
Idaho	Don Monson		Bill Trumbo	Monson left to coach Oregon.
Iowa	Lute Olson		George Raveling	Olson left to coach Arizona.
Lehigh	Brian Hill		Tom Schneider	Hill left to join the coaching staff at Penn State. Schneider was hired from the Penn coaching staff.
Long Beach State	Tex Winter		Dave Buss	Winter left to join the LSU coaching staff. Buss was hired from the UNLV coaching staff.
Marquette	Hank Raymonds		Rick Majerus	
Marshall	Bob Zuffelato		Rick Huckabay	
Mississippi Valley State	Jerry Lewis		Lafayette Stribling	
Montana State	Bruce Haroldson		Stu Starner	Starner was hired from the Minnesota coaching staff.
North Texas State	Bill Blakeley		Tommy Newman	
Northern Arizona	Gene Visscher		Jay Arnote	
Oregon	Jim Haney		Don Monson	Haney resigned after going 53–82 in five seasons with Oregon. He joined the Metro Conference as assistant commissioner.
Penn State	Dick Harter		Bruce Parkhill	Harter left to join the Detroit Pistons coaching staff.
Saint Francis	Dave Magarity		Kevin Porter	Magarity left to join the Iona coaching staff. Porter was hired after an 11 year playing career.
San Diego	John Block		Tom Marshall	
Southwest Missouri State	Bob Cleeland		Charlie Spoonhour	Spoonhour was hired from the Nebraska coaching staff.
Towson	Vince Angotti		Terry Truax	Truax was hired from the Mississippi State coaching staff.
UC Santa Barbara	Ed DeLacy		Jerry Pimm	
UMass	Tom McLaughlin		Ron Gerlufsen	
Utah	Jerry Pimm		Lynn Archibald	Pimm left to coach UC Santa Barbara.
Washington State	George Raveling		Len Stevens	Raveling left to coach Iowa.
William & Mary	Bruce Parkhill		Barry Parkhill	Bruce left to coach Penn State. Barry was promoted to head coach, taking over after his older brother left.

== See also ==
- 1983 All-Pacific Coast men's basketball team
