= List of Grand Canyon Antelopes men's basketball head coaches =

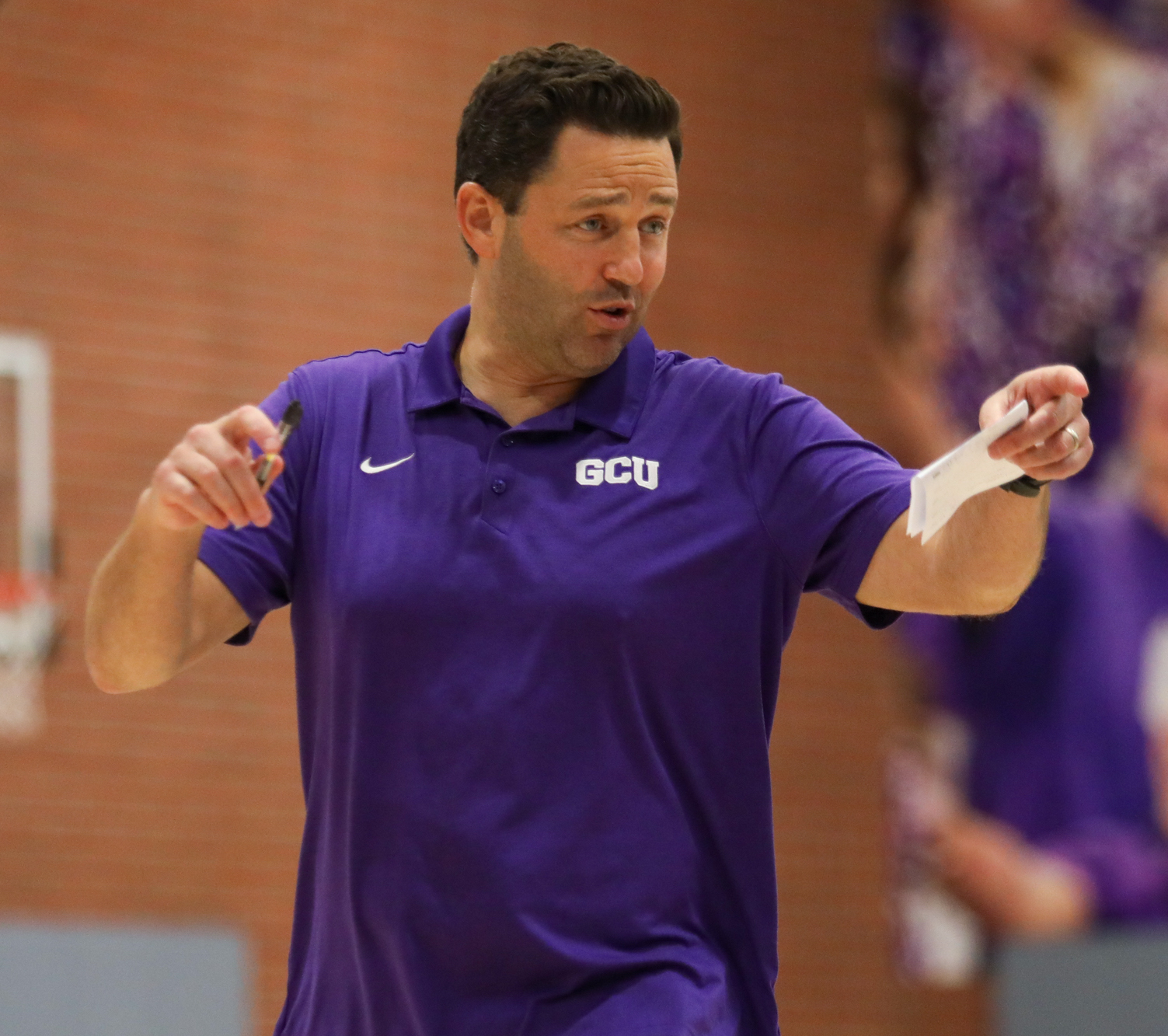
Bryce Drew, the current head coach of the Grand Canyon Antelopes.

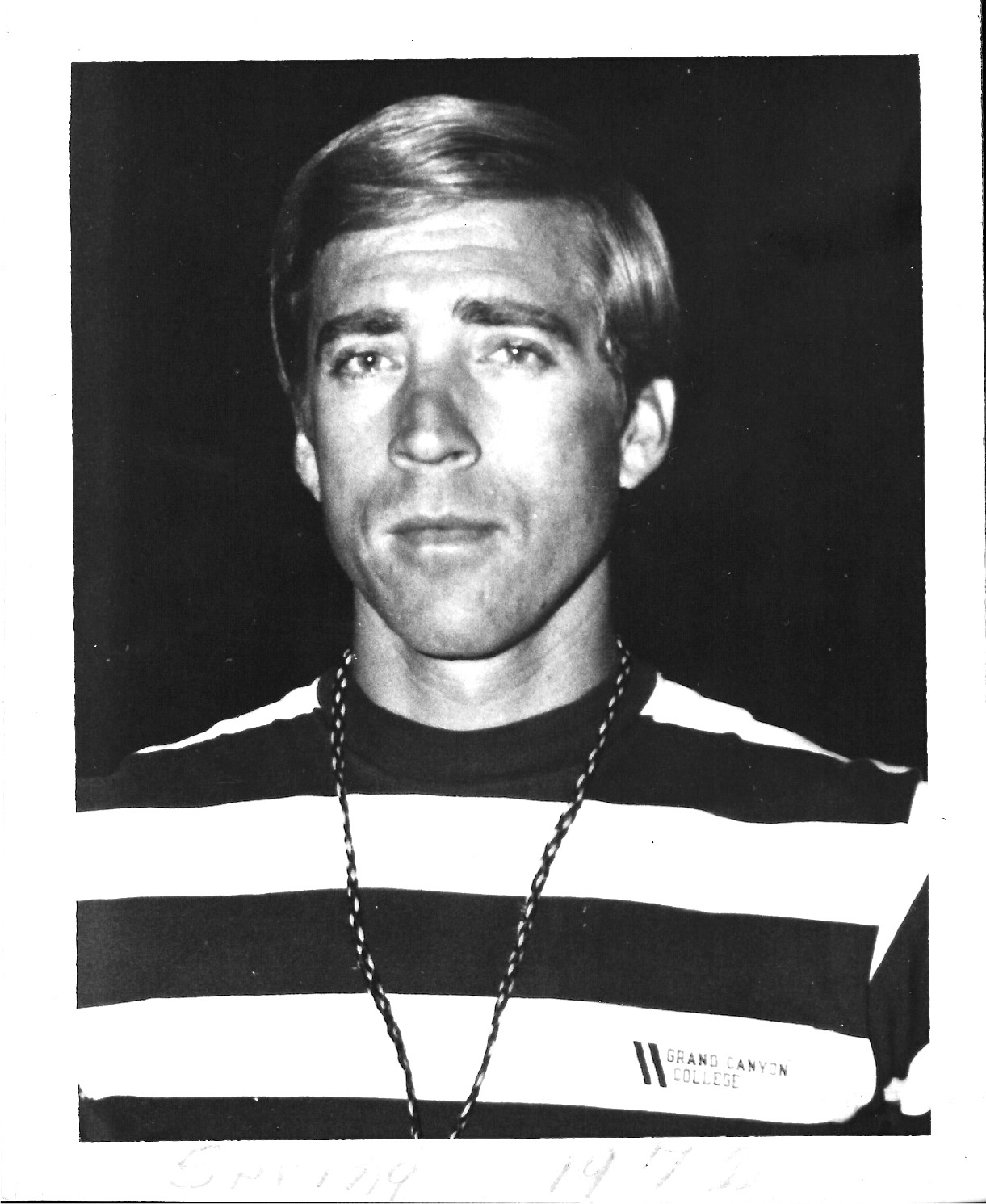
Ben Lindsey, the winningest head coach in Antelopes men's basketball history.

The following is a list of Grand Canyon Antelopes men's basketball head coaches. There have been 14 head coaches of the Antelopes in their 74-season history.

Grand Canyon's current head coach is Bryce Drew. He was hired as the Antelopes' head coach in March 2020, replacing Dan Majerle, who was fired after the 2019–20 season.

No.	Tenure	Coach	Years	Record	Pct.
1	1949–1951	Howard Mansfield	2	2–19	.095
2	1951–1960; 1961–1965	Dave Brazell	13	151–134	.530
3	1960–1961	Don Reed	1	12–10	.545
4	1965–1981	Ben Lindsey	16	317–137	.698
5	1981–1983	Jay Arnote	2	40–19	.678
6	1983–1986	John Shumate	3	58–33	.637
7	1986–1988	Paul Westphal	2	63–18	.778
8	1988–1990	Bill Westphal	2	51–15	.773
9	1990–2004	Leighton McCrary	14	216–178	.548
10	2004–2008	Scott Mossman	4	65–47	.580
11	2008–2009	Dan Nichols	1	13–14	.481
12	2009–2013	Russ Pennell	4	72–44	.621
13	2013–2020	Dan Majerle	7	136–89	.604
14	2020–present	Bryce Drew	3	64–27	.703
Totals		14 coaches	74 seasons	1,260–784	.616
Records updated through end of 2022–23 season Source
