= 1983 MEAC men's basketball tournament =

- Classification: Division I
- Season: 1982–83
- Teams: 7
- Site: Campus sites
- Finals site: Greensboro Coliseum; Greensboro, North Carolina
- Champions: North Carolina A&T (8th title)
- Winning coach: Don Corbett (2nd title)
- MVP: Joe Binion (North Carolina A&T)

1982–83 MEAC men's basketball standings
	Conf.				Overall
Team	W		L	PCT	W		L	PCT
Howard	11	–	1	.917	18	–	8	.692
North Carolina A&T †	9	–	3	.750	23	–	8	.742
South Carolina State	5	–	7	.417	13	–	15	.464
Maryland Eastern Shore	5	–	7	.417	10	–	19	.345
Delaware State	5	–	7	.417	8	–	19	.296
Florida A&M	4	–	8	.333	7	–	21	.250
Bethune–Cookman	3	–	9	.250	5	–	21	.192
† 1983 MEAC tournament winner Rankings from AP Poll

The 1983 Mid-Eastern Athletic Conference men's basketball tournament took place March 10–12 at Greensboro Coliseum in Greensboro, North Carolina. North Carolina A&T defeated Howard, 71–64 in the championship game, to win its second consecutive MEAC Tournament title.

The Aggies earned an automatic bid to the 1983 NCAA tournament as a No. 12 seed in the West region.

== Format ==
All seven conference members participated, with play beginning in the quarterfinal round. Teams were seeded based on their regular season conference record.

== Bracket ==
Quarterfinals; March 10
4	Delaware State	58
5	South Carolina State	65
3	Maryland Eastern Shore	73
6	Florida A&M	71
2	North Carolina A&T	80
7	Bethune–Cookman	73

Semifinals; March 11
1	Howard	67
5	South Carolina State	57
3	Maryland Eastern Shore	74
2	North Carolina A&T	81

Final; March 12
1	Howard	64
2	North Carolina A&T	71

* denotes overtime period
