= 1983 Midwestern City Conference men's basketball tournament =

- Classification: Division I
- Season: 1982–83
- Teams: 6
- Site: Roberts Municipal Stadium; Evansville, Indiana
- Champions: Xavier (1st title)
- Winning coach: Bob Staak (1st title)
- MVP: Alfredrick Hughes (Loyola Chicago)
- Midwestern City Conference men's basketball tournaments

1982–83 Midwestern City Conference men's basketball standings
| | Conf. | | | | Overall |
| Team | W | | L | PCT | W | | L | PCT |
|---|---|---|---|---|---|---|---|---|
| Loyola-Chicago | 12 | – | 2 | .857 | 19 | – | 10 | .655 |
| Xavier † | 10 | – | 4 | .714 | 22 | – | 8 | .733 |
| Oral Roberts | 10 | – | 4 | .714 | 14 | – | 14 | .500 |
| Butler | 9 | – | 5 | .643 | 15 | – | 13 | .536 |
| Evansville | 6 | – | 8 | .429 | 13 | – | 16 | .448 |
| Detroit | 6 | – | 8 | .429 | 12 | – | 17 | .414 |
| Saint Louis | 2 | – | 12 | .143 | 5 | – | 23 | .179 |
| Oklahoma City | 1 | – | 13 | .071 | 4 | – | 22 | .154 |
† 1983 MCC tournament winner

The 1983 Midwestern City Conference men's basketball tournament (now known as the Horizon League men's basketball tournament) was held March 10–12 at Roberts Municipal Stadium in Evansville, Indiana.

Xavier defeated Loyola-Chicago in the championship game, 82–76, to win their first MCC/Horizon League men's basketball tournament.

The Musketeers received an automatic bid to the 1983 NCAA tournament as the #12 seed in the Midwest region. Xavier lost the play-in game to fellow #12 seed Alcorn State.

== Format ==
Six of eight conference members participated in the tournament and were seeded based on regular season conference records.

== Bracket ==
Quarterfinals; Friday, March 10
5 | Evansville | 72
4 | Butler | 63
6 | Detroit | 78
3 | Oral Roberts | 77

Semifinals; Saturday, March 11
1 | Loyola Chicago | 80
5 | Evansville | 66
6 | Detroit | 70
2 | Xavier | 90

Championship; Sunday, March 12
1 | Loyola Chicago | 76
2 | Xavier | 82
