= Bob Staak =

American basketball player and coach (born 1947)

Biographical details
- Born: December 22, 1947 (age 78); Darien, Connecticut, U.S.

Playing career
- 1968–1971: UConn

Coaching career (HC unless noted)
- 1973–1975: UConn (assistant)
- 1975–1976: William & Mary (assistant)
- 1976–1979: Penn (assistant)
- 1979–1985: Xavier
- 1985–1989: Wake Forest
- 1989–1990: Los Angeles Clippers (assistant)
- 1990–1994: Miami Heat (assistant)
- 1994–1997: Washington Bullets (assistant)
- 1997: Washington Bullets (Interim HC)
- 1997–1999: Golden State Warriors (assistant)
- 2000–2002: Vancouver/Memphis Grizzlies (assistant)

Administrative career (AD unless noted)
- 1979–1984: Xavier

Head coaching record
- Overall: 133–155 (.462)
- Tournaments: 0–1 (NCAA Division I); 2–1 (NIT)

Accomplishments and honors

Championships
- MCC regular season (1981); MCC tournament (1983)

Awards
- MCC Coach of the Year (1981)

Robert John Staak (born December 22, 1947) is an American former college basketball and professional basketball coach.

== Early life ==
Staak was born in Darien, Connecticut. He attended Darien High School, where he played basketball and became the all-time leading scorer with 1,166 points, a mark that still stands. He graduated in 1966, and he was recruited by about 100 universities.

== College career ==
Staak attended St. John's University as a freshman, taking business courses. However, living off-campus didn't provide the atmosphere he was looking for, and when he decided that he wanted to someday be a basketball coach and St. John's didn't offer the academic concentration he sought, he transferred to the University of Connecticut. Due to transfer rules, he had to sit out a year before playing basketball for UConn. He played three years of varsity basketball for the Huskies, ending his career as the school's fourth all-time leading scorer. He was named All-New England and All-Yankee Conference. A two-year co-captain, he was named UConn's Most Valuable Player his senior year and he earned the UConn Club Award as the Outstanding Senior Athlete. He graduated in 1971.

== Professional career ==
After graduating, he signed to play professional basketball with the Pittsburgh Condors of the American Basketball Association (ABA), but was cut in preseason. He returned to Connecticut and played in the New York State Pro League on weekends for a year while also coaching at East Hartford High School. The following year, he was invited to tryout for the ABA's Kentucky Colonels, but they had a contract dispute and Staak decided to end his playing career.

== Coaching career ==
Staak became an assistant coach at UConn for two years under his college coach Dee Rowe. He then served as an assistant for one season at the College of William and Mary in Virginia. He then served as an assistant at the Ivy League's University of Pennsylvania under future Hall-of-Famer Chuck Daly. In 1979, the Quakers advanced to the NCAA Final Four.

After their tournament run, Staak got his first college basketball head coaching job when he was named head coach/athletic director at Xavier University in Cincinnati, where he coached from 1979 to 1985. Staak compiled an 88–86 record (.506) in six seasons as the Musketeers head coach. He worked to rebuild, compiling a 28-54 (.341) record in his first three years and a 60-32 (.652) record in his final three years.

He then became head coach at Wake Forest University from 1985 to 1989, where his teams posted a 45–69 record in four seasons.

For the next 12 seasons he was an assistant coach and/or scout in the National Basketball Association (NBA), for the Los Angeles Clippers, Miami Heat, Washington Bullets, Golden State Warriors, and Memphis Grizzlies. He spent two years (2003–05) as a referee observer with the NBA followed by one season as a scout for the Boston Celtics. He then spent seven-plus seasons with the Orlando Magic from January 2005 to July 2012.

== Head coaching record ==
=== NBA ===
Team	Year	G	W	L	W–L%	Finish	PG	PW	PL	PW–L%	Result
Washington	1996–97	1	0	1	.000	Interim coach	—	—	—	—	Interim
Career		1	0	1	–		0	0	0	–	

=== College ===
Record table
Season	Team	Overall	Conference	Standing	Postseason
Xavier Musketeers (Midwestern City Conference) (1979–1985)
1979–80	Xavier	8–18	0–5	6th	
1980–81	Xavier	12–16	8–3	1st	
1981–82	Xavier	8–20	1–11	7th	
1982–83	Xavier	22–8	10–4	T–2nd	NCAA Division I Preliminary Round
1983–84	Xavier	22–11	9–5	3rd	NIT Quarterfinals
1984–85	Xavier	16–13	7–7	5th	
Xavier:		88–86 (.506)	35–35 (.500)		
Wake Forest Demon Deacons (Atlantic Coast Conference) (1985–1989)
1985–86	Wake Forest	8–21	0–14	8th	
1986–87	Wake Forest	14–15	2–12	7th	
1987–88	Wake Forest	10–18	3–11	8th	
1988–89	Wake Forest	13–15	3–11	7th	
Wake Forest:		45–69 (.395)	8–48 (.143)		
Total:		133–155 (.462)			
National champion Postseason invitational champion Conference regular season champion Conference regular season and conference tournament champion Division regular season champion Division regular season and conference tournament champion Conference tournament champion

== Personal life ==
Staak was inducted into the Xavier Athletic Hall of Fame in 1990, the Greater Cincinnati Basketball Hall of Fame in 2002, the New England Basketball Hall of Fame in 2009, and the UConn Fairfield County Sports Hall of Fame in 2010.

He is married to Donna (Durant) and Staak has a grown son and stepdaughter.
