= Aaron Douglas =

Aaron Douglas may refer to:

- Aaron Douglas (actor) (born 1971), Canadian actor
- Aaron Douglas (artist) (1899–1979), American painter, illustrator and visual arts educator
- Aaron Douglas (basketball), American basketball player
- Aaron Douglas (rugby league), Australian rugby league footballer
