= Ben Lindsey =

Ben Lindsey may refer to:

- Ben B. Lindsey (1869–1943), American judge and social reformer
- Ben Lindsey (basketball) (born 1939 or 1940), American collegiate coach
- Ben Lindsey (discus thrower) (born 1977), American discus thrower and shot putter, 1998 All-American for the Washington Huskies track and field team

== See also ==
- Ben Lindsay, British runner (2007 European Cross Country Championships#Junior men teams)
- Ben Lindsay, Australian swimming medalist (2012 Australian Swimming Championships#Men's events 4×100 m medley relay)
