= 1982–83 La Salle Explorers men's basketball team =

American college basketball season

1982–83 La Salle Explorers men's basketball

ECC East co-champion ECC tournament champion

NCAA Division I tournament, First Round
- Conference: East Coast Conference
- Record: 18–14 (7–2 ECC)
- Head coach: Lefty Ervin (4th season)
- Assistant coaches: Joe Mihalich; Marcel Arribi; Sam Rines
- Home arena: Convention Hall

1982–83 ECC men's basketball standings
| | Conf. | | | | Overall |
| Team | W | | L | PCT | W | | L | PCT |
|---|---|---|---|---|---|---|---|---|
East
| American | 7 | – | 2 | .778 | 20 | – | 10 | .667 |
| Hofstra | 7 | – | 2 | .778 | 18 | – | 9 | .667 |
| La Salle † | 7 | – | 2 | .778 | 18 | – | 14 | .563 |
| Drexel | 5 | – | 4 | .556 | 14 | – | 15 | .483 |
| Towson | 2 | – | 7 | .222 | 7 | – | 21 | .250 |
West
| Rider | 10 | – | 3 | .769 | 20 | – | 9 | .690 |
| Bucknell | 8 | – | 5 | .615 | 17 | – | 11 | .607 |
| Delaware | 4 | – | 9 | .308 | 11 | – | 14 | .440 |
| Lafayette | 3 | – | 10 | .231 | 7 | – | 21 | .250 |
| Lehigh | 2 | – | 11 | .154 | 10 | – | 16 | .385 |
† 1983 ECC tournament winner Rankings from AP poll

The 1982–83 La Salle Explorers men's basketball team represented La Salle University as a member of the East Coast Conference during the 1982–83 NCAA Division I men's basketball season. The team was led by head coach Lefty Ervin and played their home games at The Palestra in Philadelphia, Pennsylvania. After finishing in a three-way tie atop the ECC East division standings, the Explorers won the ECC tournament to receive a bid to the NCAA tournament. As one of two No. 12 seeds in the East region, La Salle defeated Boston University in the Play-in round before losing to No. 5 seed VCU in the first round. The team finished with a record of 18–14 (7–2 ECC).

== Roster ==
1982–83 La Salle Explorers men's basketball team
Players
Coaches

| Pos. | # | Name | Height | Weight | Year | Previous school | Hometown |
|---|---|---|---|---|---|---|---|
| G/F | 10 | Phil Burton | 6 ft 5 in (1.96 m) | 175 lb (79 kg) | Jr | Benjamin Franklin | Philadelphia, Pennsylvania |
| G/F | 11 | Ralph Lewis | 6 ft 6 in (1.98 m) | 190 lb (86 kg) | So | Frankford | Philadelphia, Pennsylvania |
| G | 21 | Dallas Philson | 5 ft 11 in (1.8 m) | 170 lb (77 kg) | So | South Philadelphia | Philadelphia, Pennsylvania |
| G | 22 | Steve Black | 6 ft 3 in (1.91 m) | 185 lb (84 kg) | | Overbrook | Philadelphia, Pennsylvania |
| F/C | 24 | Albert Butts | 6 ft 9 in (2.06 m) | 210 lb (95 kg) | So | South Philadelphia | Philadelphia, Pennsylvania |
| C | 54 | Tom Piotrowski | 7 ft 1 in (2.16 m) | 235 lb (107 kg) | Sr | Great Valley | West Chester, Pennsylvania |

Head coach

- Lefty Ervin

Assistant coach(es)

Legend

- (C) Team captain
- (S) Suspended
- (I) Ineligible
- (W) Walk-on
- Injured
- Current redshirt

Roster

== Schedule and results ==
| Date time, TV | Rank^{#} | Opponent^{#} | Result | Record | Site city, state |
Regular season
| Dec 1, 1982* | | Bucknell | W 68–66 | 1–0 | The Palestra; Philadelphia, Pennsylvania |
| Dec 4, 1982* | | at Delaware | W 55–54 | 2–0 | Delaware Field House; Newark, Delaware |
| Dec 8, 1982* | | Rhode Island | L 82–84 | 2–1 | The Palestra; Philadelphia, Pennsylvania |
| Dec 10, 1982* | | vs. Texas A&M | L 74–82 | 2–2 | |
| Dec 11, 1982* | | vs. Brown | W 61–59 | 3–2 | |
| Dec 18, 1982* | | vs. Penn | L 72–78 | 3–3 | |
| Dec 22, 1982* | | Niagara | W 82–65 | 4–3 | The Palestra; Philadelphia, Pennsylvania |
| Dec 27, 1982* | | vs. Cincinnati | L 73–76 | 4–4 | |
| Dec 28, 1982* | | vs. Wisconsin–Green Bay | W 62–51 | 5–4 | |
| Jan 3, 1983* | | at Western Kentucky | W 62–56 | 6–4 | E.A. Diddle Arena; Bowling Green, Kentucky |
| Jan 8, 1983* | | Duke | L 60–61 | 6–5 | The Palestra; Philadelphia, Pennsylvania |
| Jan 12, 1983* | | Towson | W 79–78 | 7–5 | The Palestra; Philadelphia, Pennsylvania |
| Jan 15, 1983* | | Duquesne | W 67–61 | 8–5 | The Palestra; Philadelphia, Pennsylvania |
| Jan 22, 1983* | | vs. No. 13 Villanova | L 71–72 | 8–6 | |
| Jan 26, 1983* | | Hofstra | W 78–62 | 9–6 | The Palestra; Philadelphia, Pennsylvania |
| Jan 29, 1983* | | at Canisius | L 54–55 | 9–7 | Koessler Athletic Center; Buffalo, New York |
| Jan 31, 1983* | | Rider | L 69–71 | 9–8 | The Palestra; Philadelphia, Pennsylvania |
| Feb 2, 1983* | | at Notre Dame | L 56–68 | 9–9 | Joyce Center; Notre Dame, Indiana |
| Feb 5, 1983* | | vs. Saint Joseph's | W 79–60 | 10–9 | |
| Feb 9, 1983* | | at Xavier | L 85–109 | 10–10 | Schmidt Fieldhouse; Cincinnati, Ohio |
| Feb 14, 1983* | | Dayton | L 73–79 | 10–11 | The Palestra; Philadelphia, Pennsylvania |
| Feb 16, 1983* | | at Lehigh | W 46–44 | 11–11 | Stabler Arena; Bethlehem, Pennsylvania |
| Feb 19, 1983* | | at American | L 63–65 | 11–12 | Fort Myer Ceremonial Hall; Washington, D.C. |
| Feb 23, 1983* | | Lafayette | W 79–61 | 12–12 | The Palestra; Philadelphia, Pennsylvania |
| Feb 26, 1983* | | vs. Temple | L 79–84 | 12–13 | |
| Mar 3, 1983* | | at Drexel | W 63–61 | 13–13 | Daskalakis Athletic Center; Philadelphia, Pennsylvania |
| Mar 5, 1983* | | at Vermont | W 87–73 | 14–13 | Roy L. Patrick Gymnasium; Burlington, Vermont |
ECC Tournament
| Mar 9, 1983* | | Delaware; Quarterfinals | W 102–62 | 15–13 | Tom Gola Arena |
| Mar 11, 1983* | | vs. Rider; Semifinals | W 68–57 | 16–13 | Kirby Sports Center |
| Mar 12, 1983* | | vs. American; Championship game | W 75–73 | 17–13 | Kirby Sports Center |
NCAA Tournament
| Mar 15, 1983* | (12 MW) | vs. (12 MW) Boston University; Play-in game | W 70–58 | 18–13 | The Palestra; Philadelphia, Pennsylvania |
| Mar 17, 1983* | (12 E) | vs. (5 E) VCU; First round | L 67–76 | 18–14 | Greensboro Coliseum; Greensboro, North Carolina |
*Non-conference game. ^{#}Rankings from AP poll. (#) Tournament seedings in parentheses. E=East.
