= 1983 Ohio Valley Conference men's basketball tournament =

Men's Basketball Tournament

- Classification: Division I
- Season: 1982–83
- Teams: 4
- Site: Racer Arena; Murray, Kentucky
- Champions: Morehead State Eagles (1st title)
- Winning coach: Wayne Martin (1st title)

1982–83 Ohio Valley Conference men's basketball standings
	Conf.				Overall
Team	W		L	PCT	W		L	PCT
Murray State	11	–	3	.786	21	–	8	.724
Morehead State †	10	–	4	.714	19	–	11	.633
Tennessee Tech	9	–	5	.643	16	–	12	.571
Akron	7	–	7	.500	14	–	15	.483
Eastern Kentucky	7	–	7	.500	10	–	17	.370
Youngstown State	5	–	9	.357	15	–	12	.556
Austin Peay	4	–	10	.286	11	–	16	.407
Middle Tennessee	3	–	11	.214	7	–	20	.259
† OVC tournament winner Rankings from AP Poll

The 1983 Ohio Valley Conference men's basketball tournament was the postseason men's basketball tournament of the Ohio Valley Conference during the 1982–83 NCAA Division I men's basketball season. It was held March 10–11, 1983. The semifinals and finals took place at Racer Arena in Murray, Kentucky. Two seed Morehead State won the tournament, defeating Akron in the championship game, and received the Ohio Valley's automatic bid to the NCAA tournament. The Eagles drew an 11 seed in the East region, facing the 6 seed Syracuse Orangemen.

== Format ==
The top four eligible men's basketball teams in the Ohio Valley Conference received a berth in the conference tournament. After the 14-game conference season, teams were seeded by conference record. The bottom four teams in the standings did not participate.

== Bracket ==
Semifinals; March 10
1	Murray State	61
4	Akron	65
3	Tennessee Tech	53
2	Morehead State	54

Finals; March 11
4	Akron	65
2	Morehead State	81
