= 1982 MEAC men's basketball tournament =

- Classification: Division I
- Season: 1981–82
- Teams: 7
- Site: Campus sites
- Finals site: Winston-Salem Memorial Coliseum; Winston-Salem, North Carolina
- Champions: North Carolina A&T (7th title)
- Winning coach: Don Corbett (1st title)
- MVP: Eric Boyd (North Carolina A&T)

1981–82 MEAC men's basketball standings
	Conf.				Overall
Team	W		L	PCT	W		L	PCT
North Carolina A&T †	10	–	2	.833	19	–	9	.679
Howard	9	–	3	.750	17	–	11	.607
South Carolina State	7	–	5	.583	10	–	15	.400
Florida A&M	5	–	7	.417	10	–	17	.370
Delaware State	4	–	8	.333	13	–	13	.500
Bethune–Cookman	4	–	8	.333	10	–	18	.357
Maryland Eastern Shore	3	–	9	.250	6	–	20	.231
† 1982 MEAC tournament winner Rankings from AP Poll

The 1982 Mid-Eastern Athletic Conference men's basketball tournament took place March 5–7 at Winston-Salem Memorial Coliseum in Winston-Salem, North Carolina. North Carolina A&T defeated Howard, 79–67 in the championship game, to win the MEAC Tournament title.

The Aggies earned an automatic bid to the 1982 NCAA tournament as a No. 12 seed in the West region.

== Format ==
All seven conference members participated, with play beginning in the quarterfinal round. Teams were seeded based on their regular season conference record.

== Bracket ==
Quarterfinals; March 5
4	Florida A&M	47
5	Delaware State	42
3	South Carolina State	53
6	Bethune-Cookman	54
2	Howard	80
7	Maryland Eastern Shore	73

Semifinals; March 6
1	North Carolina A&T	47
4	Florida A&M	45
6	Bethune-Cookman	49
2	Howard	50

Final; March 7
1	North Carolina A&T	79
2	Howard	67
