= 1983 East Coast Conference (Division I) men's basketball tournament =

Basketball Tournament

- Classification: Division I
- Season: 1982–83
- Teams: 10
- First round site: Home Courts
- Quarterfinals site: Home Courts
- Semifinals site: Kirby Sports Center; Easton, PA
- Finals site: Kirby Sports Center; Easton, PA
- Champions: La Salle (4th title)
- Winning coach: Lefty Ervin (2nd title)

1982–83 ECC men's basketball standings
	Conf.				Overall
Team	W		L	PCT	W		L	PCT
East
American	7	–	2	.778	20	–	10	.667
Hofstra	7	–	2	.778	18	–	9	.667
La Salle †	7	–	2	.778	18	–	14	.563
Drexel	5	–	4	.556	14	–	15	.483
Towson	2	–	7	.222	7	–	21	.250
West
Rider	10	–	3	.769	20	–	9	.690
Bucknell	8	–	5	.615	17	–	11	.607
Delaware	4	–	9	.308	11	–	14	.440
Lafayette	3	–	10	.231	7	–	21	.250
Lehigh	2	–	11	.154	10	–	16	.385
† 1983 ECC tournament winner Rankings from AP poll

The 1983 East Coast Conference men's basketball tournament was held March 7–12, 1983. The champion gained and an automatic berth to the NCAA tournament.

== Bracket and results ==
First round Monday, March 7
7	Drexel	88
10	Towson	67
8	Lafayette	61
9	Lehigh	62

Quarterfinals; Wednesday, March 9
1	Rider	60
7	Drexel	51
4	La Salle	102
5	Delaware	62
3	Bucknell	56
6	Hofstra	55
2	American	77
9	Lehigh	59

Semifinals; Friday, March 11
1	Rider	57
4	La Salle	68
3	Bucknell	49
2	American	51

Championship; Saturday, March 12
4	La Salle	75
2	American	73

* denotes overtime game
