= 1982–83 Morehead State Eagles men's basketball team =

American college basketball season

1982–83 Morehead State Eagles men's basketball

Ohio Valley tournament champions

NCAA tournament, First round
- Conference: Ohio Valley Conference
- Record: 19–11 (10–4 OVC)
- Head coach: Wayne Martin
- Home arena: Ellis Johnson Arena

1982–83 Ohio Valley Conference men's basketball standings
	Conf.				Overall
Team	W		L	PCT	W		L	PCT
Murray State	11	–	3	.786	21	–	8	.724
Morehead State †	10	–	4	.714	19	–	11	.633
Tennessee Tech	9	–	5	.643	16	–	12	.571
Akron	7	–	7	.500	14	–	15	.483
Eastern Kentucky	7	–	7	.500	10	–	17	.370
Youngstown State	5	–	9	.357	15	–	12	.556
Austin Peay	4	–	10	.286	11	–	16	.407
Middle Tennessee	3	–	11	.214	7	–	20	.259
† OVC tournament winner Rankings from AP Poll

The 1982–83 Morehead State Eagles men's basketball team represented Morehead State University during the 1982–83 NCAA Division I men's basketball season. The Eagles, led by head coach Wayne Martin, played their home games at Ellis Johnson Arena and are members of the Ohio Valley Conference. They finished the season 19–11, 10–4 in Ohio Valley play and were champions of the 1983 Ohio Valley Conference men's basketball tournament to earn an automatic bid in the NCAA tournament. As an 11 seed, they fell to No. 6 seed Syracuse in the first round.

== Roster ==
1982–83 Morehead State Eagles men's basketball team
Players	Coaches
Pos. / # / Name / Height / Weight / Year / Hometown; F / / Earl Harrison / 6 ft 7 in (2.01 m) / — / Jr	Head coach: Wayne Martin; Assistant coach(es) Legend: (C) Team captain; (S) Suspended; (I) Ineligible; (W) Walk-on; Injured; Current redshirt

== Schedule and results ==
Date time, TV	Rank^{#}	Opponent^{#}	Result	Record	Site (attendance) city, state
Regular season
Nov 27, 1982*		at Western Kentucky	L 64–66	0–1	E.A. Diddle Arena; Bowling Green, Kentucky
Ohio Valley Conference Basketball tournament
Mar 10, 1983*		vs. Tennessee Tech; Semifinals	W 54–53	18–10	Racer Arena; Murray, Kentucky
Mar 11, 1983*		vs. Akron; Championship game	W 81–65	19–10	Racer Arena; Murray, Kentucky
NCAA tournament
Mar 18, 1983*	(11 E)	vs. (6 E) Syracuse; First Round	L 59–74	19–11	Hartford Civic Center; Hartford, Connecticut
*Non-conference game. ^{#}Rankings from AP Poll. (#) Tournament seedings in parentheses. All times are in Eastern Time.
