= 1982–83 Xavier Musketeers men's basketball team =

American college basketball season

1982–83 Xavier Musketeers men's basketball

MCC tournament champions

NCAA tournament, Play-in game
- Conference: Midwestern Collegiate Conference
- Record: 22–8 (10–4 MCC)
- Head coach: Bob Staak (4th season)
- Home arena: Cincinnati Gardens

1982–83 Midwestern City Conference men's basketball standings
| | Conf. | | | | Overall |
| Team | W | | L | PCT | W | | L | PCT |
|---|---|---|---|---|---|---|---|---|
| Loyola-Chicago | 12 | – | 2 | .857 | 19 | – | 10 | .655 |
| Xavier † | 10 | – | 4 | .714 | 22 | – | 8 | .733 |
| Oral Roberts | 10 | – | 4 | .714 | 14 | – | 14 | .500 |
| Butler | 9 | – | 5 | .643 | 15 | – | 13 | .536 |
| Evansville | 6 | – | 8 | .429 | 13 | – | 16 | .448 |
| Detroit | 6 | – | 8 | .429 | 12 | – | 17 | .414 |
| Saint Louis | 2 | – | 12 | .143 | 5 | – | 23 | .179 |
| Oklahoma City | 1 | – | 13 | .071 | 4 | – | 22 | .154 |
† 1983 MCC tournament winner

The 1982–83 Xavier Musketeers men's basketball team represented Xavier University from Cincinnati, Ohio in the 1982–83 season. Led by head coach Bob Staak, the Musketeers finished with a 22–8 record (10–4 MCC), and won the MCC tournament to receive an automatic bid to the NCAA tournament. In the NCAA tournament, the Musketeers lost to fellow No. 12 seed Alcorn State in the Play-in round.

== Roster ==
1982–83 Xavier Musketeers men's basketball team
| Players | Coaches |
|---|---|
| Pos. / # / Name / Height / Weight / Year / Hometown; G / 30 / Anthony Hicks / 6 ft 0 in (1.83 m) / — / Sr | Head coach: Bob Staak (Fairfield); Assistant coach(es) Legend: (C) Team captain; (S) Suspended; (I) Ineligible; (W) Walk-on; Injured; Current redshirt |

== Schedule and results ==
| Date time, TV | Rank^{#} | Opponent^{#} | Result | Record | Site city, state |
Regular season
| Nov 29, 1982* | | Union (KY) | W 75–62 | 1–0 | Schmidt Fieldhouse; Cincinnati, Ohio |
| Dec 4, 1982* | | Central State | W 67–57 | 2–0 | Schmidt Fieldhouse; Cincinnati, Ohio |
| Dec 7, 1982* | | at Texas | W 66–64 ^{OT} | 3–0 | Frank Erwin Center; Austin, Texas |
| Dec 11, 1982* | | at Dayton | L 53–63 | 3–1 | University of Dayton Arena; Dayton, Ohio |
| Dec 22, 1982* | | Miami (OH) | W 54–50 | 4–1 | Schmidt Fieldhouse; Cincinnati, Ohio |
| Dec 30, 1982* | | Thomas More | W 88–76 | 5–1 | Schmidt Fieldhouse; Cincinnati, Ohio |
| Jan 3, 1983* | | at Middle Tennessee State | W 58–57 | 6–1 | Murphy Center; Murfreesboro, Tennessee |
| Jan 8, 1983* | | at Marquette | L 64–72 | 6–2 | MECCA Arena; Milwaukee, WI |
| Jan 11, 1983* | | Eastern Kentucky | W 70–49 | 7–2 | Schmidt Fieldhouse; Cincinnati, Ohio |
| Jan 15, 1983 | | Evansville | W 85–65 | 8–2 (1–0) | Schmidt Fieldhouse; Cincinnati, Ohio |
| Jan 17, 1983 | | Butler | W 51–49 | 9–2 (2–0) | Schmidt Fieldhouse; Cincinnati, Ohio |
| Jan 22, 1983 | | at Detroit | W 70–56 | 10–2 (3–0) | |
| Jan 24, 1983 | | Loyola (IL) | W 84–78 | 11–2 (4–0) | Schmidt Fieldhouse; Cincinnati, Ohio |
| Jan 26, 1983* | | at Cincinnati | L 58–73 | 11–3 | |
| Jan 29, 1983 | | at Oklahoma City | W 76–58 | 12–3 (5–0) | |
| Jan 31, 1983 | | at Oral Roberts | L 71–87 | 12–4 (5–1) | |
| Feb 3, 1983* | | Cleveland State | W 102–72 | 13–4 | Schmidt Fieldhouse; Cincinnati, Ohio |
| Feb 5, 1983 | | Saint Louis | L 60–79 | 13–5 (5–2) | Schmidt Fieldhouse; Cincinnati, Ohio |
| Feb 7, 1983 | | at Butler | L 52–72 | 13–6 (5–3) | |
| Feb 9, 1983* | | La Salle | W 109–85 | 14–6 | Schmidt Fieldhouse; Cincinnati, Ohio |
| Feb 16, 1983 | | at Evansville | W 70–68 | 15–6 (6–3) | |
| Feb 19, 1983 | | Detroit | W 69–61 | 16–6 (7–3) | Schmidt Fieldhouse; Cincinnati, Ohio |
| Feb 21, 1983 | | at Loyola (IL) | L 85–86 | 16–7 (7–4) | |
| Feb 24, 1983 | | Oral Roberts | W 87–79 | 17–7 (8–4) | Schmidt Fieldhouse; Cincinnati, Ohio |
| Feb 26, 1983 | | Oklahoma City | W 79–53 | 18–7 (9–4) | Schmidt Fieldhouse; Cincinnati, Ohio |
| Mar 2, 1983* | | Niagara | W 76–73 | 19–7 | Schmidt Fieldhouse; Cincinnati, Ohio |
| Mar 5, 1983 | | at Saint Louis | W 94–72 | 20–7 (10–4) | |
Midwestern Collegiate Conference tournament
| Mar 11, 1983* | | vs. Detroit | W 90–70 | 21–7 | Roberts Municipal Stadium |
| Mar 12, 1983* | | vs. Loyola (IL) | W 82–76 | 22–7 | Roberts Municipal Stadium |
NCAA Tournament
| Mar 15, 1983* | (12 MW) | vs. (12 MW) Alcorn State; Play-in game | L 58–70 | 22–8 | University of Dayton Arena; Dayton, Ohio |
*Non-conference game. ^{#}Rankings from AP Poll. (#) Tournament seedings in parentheses. MW=Midwest. All times are in Eastern Time.
