= 1981–82 North Carolina A&T Aggies men's basketball team =

American college basketball season

1981–82 North Carolina A&T Aggies men's basketball

MEAC regular season champions MEAC tournament champions

NCAA tournament, First Round
- Conference: Mid-Eastern Athletic Conference
- Record: 19–9 (10–2 MEAC)
- Head coach: Don Corbett (3rd season)
- Home arena: Corbett Sports Center

1981–82 MEAC men's basketball standings
	Conf.				Overall
Team	W		L	PCT	W		L	PCT
North Carolina A&T †	10	–	2	.833	19	–	9	.679
Howard	9	–	3	.750	17	–	11	.607
South Carolina State	7	–	5	.583	10	–	15	.400
Florida A&M	5	–	7	.417	10	–	17	.370
Delaware State	4	–	8	.333	13	–	13	.500
Bethune–Cookman	4	–	8	.333	10	–	18	.357
Maryland Eastern Shore	3	–	9	.250	6	–	20	.231
† 1982 MEAC tournament winner Rankings from AP Poll

The 1981–82 North Carolina A&T Aggies men's basketball team represented North Carolina Agricultural and Technical State University during the 1981–82 NCAA Division I men's basketball season. The Aggies, led by third-year head coach Don Corbett, played their home games at the Corbett Sports Center as members of the Mid-Eastern Athletic Conference. They finished the season 19–9, 10–2 in MEAC play to finish in first place. They were champions of the MEAC tournament, winning the championship game over Morgan State, to earn an automatic bid to the 1982 NCAA tournament where they were defeated by West Virginia, 102–72, in the opening round. This marked the first appearance in the NCAA Tournament in program history and started a streak of seven consecutive NCAA Tournament appearances.

== Roster ==
1981–82 North Carolina A&T Aggies men's basketball team
Players
Coaches

Pos.	#	Name	Height	Weight	Year	Hometown
F	25	Joe Binion	6 ft 8 in (2.03 m)	230 lb (104 kg)	So	Rochester, New York
G	34	Eric Boyd	6 ft 4 in (1.93 m)	—	Fr

Head coach

- Don Corbett

Assistant coach(es)

Legend

- (C) Team captain
- (S) Suspended
- (I) Ineligible
- (W) Walk-on
- Injured
- Current redshirt

== Schedule and results ==
Date time, TV	Rank^{#}	Opponent^{#}	Result	Record	Site (attendance) city, state
Regular season
Dec 5, 1981*		at Grambling State	L 69–71	0–1	Tiger Memorial Gym; Grambling, Louisiana
1982 MEAC tournament
Mar 6, 1982*		vs. Florida A&M; Semifinals	W 47–45	18–8	Winston-Salem Memorial Coliseum; Winston-Salem, North Carolina
Mar 7, 1982*		vs. Howard; Championship game	W 79–67	19–8	Winston-Salem Memorial Coliseum; Winston-Salem, North Carolina
1982 NCAA tournament
Mar 11, 1982*		vs. No. 14 West Virginia; First Round	L 72–102	19–9	Dee Glen Smith Spectrum; Logan, Utah
*Non-conference game. ^{#}Rankings from AP Poll. (#) Tournament seedings in parentheses. ME=Mideast. All times are in Eastern Time.

== Awards and honors ==
- Joe Binion – MEAC Player of the Year
