= 1982–83 UNLV Runnin' Rebels basketball team =

American college basketball season

1982–83 UNLV Runnin' Rebels basketball

PCAA tournament champions PCAA Regular season champions

NCAA tournament, Second Round
- Conference: Pacific Coast Athletic Association

Ranking
- Coaches: No. 6
- AP: No. 6
- Record: 28–3 (15–1 PCAA)
- Head coach: Jerry Tarkanian (10th season)
- Assistant coaches: Tim Grgurich; Mark Warkentien; Ralph Readout
- Home arena: Las Vegas Convention Center

1982–83 Pacific Coast Athletic Association men's basketball standings
	Conf.				Overall
Team	W		L	PCT	W		L	PCT
No. 6 UNLV †	15	–	1	.938	28	–	3	.903
Cal State Fullerton	12	–	4	.750	21	–	8	.724
Utah State	10	–	6	.625	20	–	9	.690
Fresno State	9	–	7	.563	25	–	10	.714
UC Irvine	8	–	8	.500	16	–	12	.571
San Jose State	7	–	9	.438	14	–	15	.483
Long Beach State	6	–	10	.375	13	–	16	.448
Pacific	4	–	12	.250	7	–	21	.250
UC Santa Barbara	1	–	15	.063	7	–	20	.259
† 1983 PCAA tournament winner

The 1982–83 UNLV Runnin' Rebels basketball team represented the University of Nevada Las Vegas in NCAA Division I men's competition in the 1982–83 season under head coach Jerry Tarkanian. The team played its final season of home games at the Las Vegas Convention Center, and was a member of the Pacific Coast Athletic Association (PCAA), now known as the Big West Conference. The Rebels won the first 24 games of the season and ascended to No. 1 in both major polls. UNLV captured the regular season conference title, then defeated Fresno State in the championship game of the PCAA Tournament. The team finished with a record of 28–3 (15–1 PCAA). As No. 3 seed in the West region, the Rebels were beaten in the second round of the NCAA tournament by eventual National champion NC State, 71–70.

== Roster ==
1982–83 UNLV Runnin' Rebels men's basketball team
Players
Coaches

Pos.	#	Name	Height	Weight	Year	Hometown
G	14	Danny Tarkanian	6 ft 2 in (1.88 m)	190 lb (86 kg)	Jr	Las Vegas, Nevada
G/F	15	Eric Booker	6 ft 4 in (1.93 m)	185 lb (84 kg)	So	San Francisco, California
F/C	21	Sidney Green	6 ft 9 in (2.06 m)	215 lb (98 kg)	Sr	Brooklyn, New York
G	22	Larry Anderson	6 ft 7 in (2.01 m)	185 lb (84 kg)	Sr	Pittsburgh,PA
G	24	Jeff Collins	6 ft 2 in (1.88 m)	175 lb (79 kg)	Jr	Phoenix, Arizona
F	33	Eldridge Hudson	6 ft 6 in (1.98 m)	210 lb (95 kg)	Fr	Carson, California

Head coach

- Jerry Tarkanian (Fresno State)

Assistant coach(es)

- Tim Grgurich (Pittsburgh)
- Mark Warkentien (Cal State Fullerton)
- Ralph Readout (Ohio)

Legend

- (C) Team captain
- (S) Suspended
- (I) Ineligible
- (W) Walk-on
- Injured
- Current redshirt

Roster

== Schedule and results ==
Date time, TV	Rank^{#}	Opponent^{#}	Result	Record	Site (attendance) city, state
Regular season
Nov 27, 1982*	No. 20	Oklahoma	W 65–54	1–0	Las Vegas Convention Center (6,380); Las Vegas, Nevada
Nov 30, 1982*	No. 19 т	at Nevada	W 85–84	2–0	Centennial Coliseum (6,042); Reno, Nevada
Dec 3, 1982*	No. 19 т	at Duquesne	W 67–54	3–0	Civic Arena (4,654); Pittsburgh, Pennsylvania
Dec 6, 1982*	No. 19 т	Arizona	W 88–70	4–0	Las Vegas Convention Center (6,380); Las Vegas, Nevada
Dec 9, 1982*	No. 19 т	Nevada	W 85–75	5–0	Las Vegas Convention Center (6,380); Las Vegas, Nevada
Dec 21, 1982*	No. 17	Long Island University	W 101–78	6–0	Las Vegas Convention Center (6,380); Las Vegas, Nevada
Dec 22, 1982*	No. 17	Baylor	W 77–65	7–0	Las Vegas Convention Center (6,380); Las Vegas, Nevada
Dec 28, 1982*	No. 15	Wagner	W 120–70	8–0	Las Vegas Convention Center (6,380); Las Vegas, Nevada
Dec 29, 1982*	No. 15	No. 8 Tennessee	W 70–54	9–0	Las Vegas Convention Center (6,380); Las Vegas, Nevada
Jan 1, 1983*	No. 15	Utah	W 71–68	10–0	Las Vegas Convention Center (6,380); Las Vegas, Nevada
Jan 6, 1983	No. 11	at Utah State	W 89–77	11–0 (1–0)	Dee Glen Smith Spectrum (10,506); Logan, Utah
Jan 8, 1983	No. 11	vs. UC Irvine	W 68–64	12–0 (2–0)	Long Beach Arena (4,229); Long Beach, California
Jan 13, 1983	No. 8	Pacific	W 86–63	13–0 (3–0)	Las Vegas Convention Center (6,380); Las Vegas, Nevada
Jan 15, 1983	No. 8	Fresno State	W 56–48	14–0 (4–0)	Las Vegas Convention Center (6,380); Las Vegas, Nevada
Jan 20, 1983	No. 5	Long Beach State	W 95–83	15–0 (5–0)	Las Vegas Convention Center (6,380); Las Vegas, Nevada
Jan 22, 1983	No. 5	Cal State Fullerton	W 76–71	16–0 (6–0)	Las Vegas Convention Center (6,380); Las Vegas, Nevada
Jan 25, 1983	No. 4	at UC Santa Barbara	W 77–73	17–0 (7–0)	The Thunderdome (4,215); Santa Barbara, California
Jan 29, 1983	No. 4	at Long Beach State	W 78–74	18–0 (8–0)	Long Beach Arena (6,077); Long Beach, California
Feb 4, 1983	No. 2	UC Santa Barbara	W 85–79	19–0 (9–0)	Las Vegas Convention Center (6,380); Las Vegas, Nevada
Feb 5, 1983	No. 2	UC Irvine	W 70–68	20–0 (10–0)	Las Vegas Convention Center (6,380); Las Vegas, Nevada
Feb 10, 1983	No. 2	at Pacific	W 79–62	21–0 (11–0)	Alex G. Spanos Center (5,902); Stockton, California
Feb 12, 1983	No. 2	at Fresno State	W 66–59	22–0 (12–0)	Selland Arena (6,586); Fresno, California
Feb 18, 1983	No. 1	San Jose State	W 84–81	23–0 (13–0)	Las Vegas Convention Center (6,380); Las Vegas, Nevada
Feb 19, 1983	No. 1	Utah State	W 111–78	24–0 (14–0)	Las Vegas Convention Center (6,380); Las Vegas, Nevada
Feb 24, 1983	No. 1	at Cal State Fullerton	L 78–86	24–1 (14–1)	Titan Gym (5,015); Fullerton, California
Feb 27, 1983*	No. 1	at West Virginia	L 78–87	24–2	WVU Coliseum (15,638); Morgantown, West Virginia
Mar 3, 1983	No. 9	at San Jose State	W 67–61	25–2 (15–1)	San Jose Civic Auditorium (2,612); San Jose, California
PCAA tournament
Mar 10, 1983*	No. 9	vs. Pacific; Quarterfinals	W 74–67	26–2	The Forum (9,717); Inglewood, California
Mar 11, 1983*	No. 9	vs. Long Beach State; Semifinals	W 67–64	27–2	The Forum (12,053); Inglewood, California
Mar 12, 1983*	No. 9	vs. Fresno State; Championship game	W 66–63 ^{OT}	28–2	The Forum (11,022); Inglewood, California
NCAA tournament
Mar 20, 1983*	(3 W) No. 6	vs. (6 W) No. 16 NC State; Second Round	L 70–71	28–3	Gill Coliseum (8,700); Corvallis, Oregon
*Non-conference game. ^{#}Rankings from AP poll. (#) Tournament seedings in parentheses. W=West.

== Rankings ==
Ranking movements Legend: ██ Increase in ranking ██ Decrease in ranking — = Not ranked т = Tied with team above or below
	Week																
Poll	Pre	1	2	3	4	5	6	7	8	9	10	11	12	13	14	15	Final
AP	20	19 т	19 т	18	17	15	11	8	5	4	2	2	1	1	9	9	6
Coaches	—	—^	—	19	18	15	13	9	9	8	3	3	2	1	11	11	6

^Coaches did not release a Week 1 poll.

== Awards and honors ==
- Sidney Green – PCAA Player of the Year

== See also ==
- UNLV Runnin' Rebels basketball
- 1983 NCAA Division I men's basketball tournament
