= Aaron Douglas (basketball) =

American basketball player

Personal information
- Listed height: 6 ft 3 in (1.91 m)

Career information
- High school: West Florence (Florence, South Carolina)
- College: Anderson (1978–1980); East Tennessee State (1980–1982)
- NBA draft: 1982: undrafted
- Position: Guard

Career history
- 1985: Hobart Devils

Aaron Douglas is an American former professional basketball player. He played college basketball for the Anderson Trojans and East Tennessee State Buccaneers. Douglas played professionally for the Hobart Devils of the Australian National Basketball League in 1985.

== High school career ==
Douglas attended West Florence High School in his native Florence, South Carolina, where he played basketball and became the top scorer in school history. As a sophomore, he averaged 16 points per game en route to his first all-city selection. As a junior, he led the city in scoring with 21.1 points per game to earn his first all-state selection. He scored a school-record 38 points in a win over Conway High School in January 1977. As a senior, he averaged 21 points and 10 rebounds per game to earn his second straight all-state selection, leading his team to a 22–3 record. He committed to Anderson Junior College in Anderson, South Carolina.

== College career ==
He played his first two years of college basketball at Anderson Junior College. As a freshman, he was named the most valuable player of the WCJCC Tournament and a member of the all-WCJCC second-team. As a sophomore he averaged 18 points per game and led the Trojans to an appearance in the National Junior College Tournament, earning junior college honorable mention All-American and first-team all-WCJCC honors. He was selected to the Junior College All-American Game, where he recorded 10 points and 12 assists.

Douglas transferred to East Tennessee State University, playing for the Buccaneers from 1980 to 1982. Initially recruited as a point guard, he led the team with 52 assists during the 1980–81 season. However, he was converted to the shooting guard position to fill in for injured teammate Troy Lee Mikell, and became known for his outside shooting. He majored in physical education. He ended his time at East Tennessee State after 55 games and averaging: 10.9 points, 49% FG, 71% FT and 2.3 rebounds.

== Professional career ==
Douglas played for the Hobart Devils of the Australian National Basketball League (NBL) during the 1985 season. He averaged 24.7 points, 4.1 rebounds and 3.8 assists in 16 games played.

== Personal life ==
Douglas married Christine Schluter, an Australian, in 1993 and settled in Australia.
