= 1982–83 Drexel Dragons men's basketball team =

American college basketball season

1982–83 Drexel Dragons men's basketball
- Conference: East Coast Conference
- East
- Record: 14–15 (5–4 ECC)
- Head coach: Eddie Burke (6th season)
- Home arena: Daskalakis Athletic Center

1982–83 ECC men's basketball standings
	Conf.				Overall
Team	W		L	PCT	W		L	PCT
East
American	7	–	2	.778	20	–	10	.667
Hofstra	7	–	2	.778	18	–	9	.667
La Salle †	7	–	2	.778	18	–	14	.563
Drexel	5	–	4	.556	14	–	15	.483
Towson	2	–	7	.222	7	–	21	.250
West
Rider	10	–	3	.769	20	–	9	.690
Bucknell	8	–	5	.615	17	–	11	.607
Delaware	4	–	9	.308	11	–	14	.440
Lafayette	3	–	10	.231	7	–	21	.250
Lehigh	2	–	11	.154	10	–	16	.385
† 1983 ECC tournament winner Rankings from AP poll

The 1982–83 Drexel Dragons men's basketball team represented Drexel University during the 1982–83 NCAA Division I men's basketball season. The Dragons, led by 6th year head coach Eddie Burke, played their home games at the Daskalakis Athletic Center and were members of the East Coast Conference (ECC).

The team finished the season 14–15, and finished in 4th place in the ECC East in the regular season.

== Roster ==
1982–83 Drexel Dragons men's basketball team
Players	Coaches
Pos. / # / Name / Height / Weight / Year / Previous school / Hometown; / / / — / —	Head coach: Eddie Burke (La Salle); Assistant coach(es) Legend: (C) Team captain; (S) Suspended; (I) Ineligible; (W) Walk-on; Injured; Current redshirt

== Schedule ==
Date time, TV	Rank^{#}	Opponent^{#}	Result	Record	High points	High rebounds	High assists	Site (attendance) city, state
Regular season
November 27, 1982		Delaware	W 51–44	1–0 (1–0)	–	–	–	Daskalakis Athletic Center (1,425); Philadelphia, PA
November 30, 1982		at Towson State	W 72–62	2–0 (2–0)	–	–	–	Towson Center (1,071); Towson, MD
December 2, 1982*		Loyola (MD)	W 72–62	3–0	–	–	–	Daskalakis Athletic Center (1,360); Philadelphia, PA
December 4, 1982*		Maine	W 59–53	4–0	–	–	–	Daskalakis Athletic Center (1,020); Philadelphia, PA
December 7, 1982*		at Robert Morris	L 58–62	4–1	–	–	–	(2,600)
December 17, 1982*		vs. Bethune–Cookman ? semifinal	W 89–66	5–1	–	–	–	Jenkins Field House (1,000); Lakeland, FL
Unknown*		at Florida Southern ? championship	L 61–63	5–2	–	–	–	Jenkins Field House (1,525); Lakeland, FL
December 20, 1982*		at Wake Forest	L 60–89	5–3	–	–	–	Winston-Salem Memorial Coliseum (4,625); Winston-Salem, NC
January 5, 1983*		St. Francis (PA)	W 74–64	6–3	–	–	–	Daskalakis Athletic Center (2,400); Philadelphia, PA
January 7, 1983*		vs. Georgia State ? semifinal	W 73–58	7–3	–	–	–	Alumni Gym (1,600); Fairfield, CT
January 8, 1983*		at Fairfield ? championship	L 60–64 ^{OT}	7–4	–	–	–	Alumni Gym (2,700); Fairfield, CT
Unknown*		Ramapo	W 86–50	8–4	–	–	–	Daskalakis Athletic Center (750); Philadelphia, PA
January 12, 1983		at Lehigh	W 65–53	9–4 (3–0)	–	–	–	Stabler Arena (1,016); Bethlehem, PA
January 15, 1983*		Northeastern	W 63–57	10–4	–	–	–	Matthews Arena (1,457); Boston, MA
January 19, 1983		Temple	L 66–77	10–5 (3–1)	–	–	–	McGonigle Hall (2,500); Philadelphia, PA
January 22, 1983		Lafayette	W 49–47	11–5 (4–1)	–	–	–	Daskalakis Athletic Center (1,020); Philadelphia, PA
January 24, 1983*		Niagara	L 63–73	11–6	–	–	–	Buffalo Memorial Auditorium (1,400); Buffalo, NY
January 26, 1983*		Fairleigh Dickinson	L 69–70	11–7	–	–	–	Daskalakis Athletic Center (1,000); Philadelphia, PA
January 29, 1983*		at Dayton	L 60–82	11–8	–	–	–	UD Arena (10,673); Dayton, OH
February 2, 1983		at American	L 55–57	11–9 (4–2)	–	–	–	Fort Myer Ceremonial Hall (1,318); Arlington, VA
February 7, 1983*		at Southwestern Louisiana	L 64–86	11–10	–	–	–	Blackham Coliseum (4,506); Lafayette, LA
February 12, 1983		at Hofstra	L 58–74	11–11 (4–3)	–	–	–	Physical Fitness Center (1,314); Hempstead, NY
February 18, 1983*		Allentown	W 56–30	12–11	–	–	–	Daskalakis Athletic Center (500); Philadelphia, PA
February 21, 1983*		at Vermont	L 64–72	12–12	–	–	–	Patrick Gym (764); Burlington, VT
February 23, 1983		at Bucknell	W 72–60	13–12 (5–2)	–	–	–	Davis Gym (1,300); Lewisburg, PA
February 26, 1983		Rider	L 48–57	13–13 (5–3)	–	–	–	Daskalakis Athletic Center (1,300); Philadelphia, PA
March 3, 1983; 7:00 pm		La Salle	L 61–63	13–14 (5–4)	–	–	–	Daskalakis Athletic Center (2,500); Philadelphia, PA
ECC Tournament
March 7, 1983	(7)	(10) Towson State; First round	W 88–67	14–14	–	–	–	Daskalakis Athletic Center (850); Philadelphia, PA
March 9, 1983	(7)	at (1) Rider; Quarterfinal	L 51–60	14–15	–	–	–	Alumni Gym (1,832); Lawrenceville, NJ
*Non-conference game. ^{#}Rankings from AP. (#) Tournament seedings in parentheses. All times are in Eastern Time.

== Awards ==
Richard Congo

- ECC All-Conference Second Team
