= Ray Dieringer =

Ray Dieringer is a former head basketball coach at Cleveland State University. He coached at Cleveland State from 1969 through 1983. He graduated from University of Dayton in 1956. He was inducted into the Cleveland State Vikings hall of fame in 1998.

== Head coaching record ==
Record table
Season	Team	Overall	Conference	Standing	Postseason
Cleveland State (Independent) (1969–1983)
1969–70	Cleveland State	5–21			
1970–71	Cleveland State	5–20			
1971–72	Cleveland State	8–18			
1972–73	Cleveland State	9–14			
1973–74	Cleveland State	6–20			
1974–75	Cleveland State	13–11			
1975–76	Cleveland State	6–19			
1976–77	Cleveland State	10–17			
1977–78	Cleveland State	12–13			
1978–79	Cleveland State	15–10			
1979–80	Cleveland State	18–8			
1980–81	Cleveland State	18–9			
1981–82	Cleveland State	17–10			
1982–83	Cleveland State	8–20			
Cleveland State:		150–210			
Total:		150–210			
National champion Postseason invitational champion Conference regular season champion Conference regular season and conference tournament champion Division regular season champion Division regular season and conference tournament champion Conference tournament champion
