= 1983 SWAC men's basketball tournament =

Basketball Tournament March 1984 in Mississippi

- Classification: Division I
- Season: 1982–83
- Teams: 7
- First round site: Campus Sites
- Semifinals site: Mississippi Coliseum; Jackson, Mississippi
- Finals site: Mississippi Coliseum; Jackson, Mississippi
- Champions: Alcorn State (4th title)
- Winning coach: Davey Whitney (4th title)

1982–83 SWAC men's basketball standings
	Conf.				Overall
Team	W		L	PCT	W		L	PCT
Texas Southern	12	–	2	.857	22	–	7	.759
Alabama State	12	–	2	.857	22	–	6	.786
Alcorn State †	10	–	4	.714	22	–	10	.688
Southern	7	–	7	.500	16	–	14	.533
Mississippi Valley State	6	–	8	.429	11	–	17	.393
Jackson State	4	–	10	.286	6	–	24	.200
Grambling State	3	–	11	.214	6	–	22	.214
Prairie View A&M	2	–	12	.143	4	–	22	.154
† 1983 SWAC tournament winner Rankings from AP Poll

The 1983 SWAC men's basketball tournament was held March 10–12, 1983. The quarterfinal round was held at the home arena of the higher-seeded team, while the semifinal and championship rounds were held at the Mississippi Coliseum in Jackson, Mississippi. Alcorn State defeated Texas Southern, 81–69 in the championship game. The Braves received the conference's automatic bid to the 1983 NCAA tournament as one of two No. 12 seeds in the Midwest Region.

== Bracket and results ==
Quarterfinals; March 10
4	Mississippi Valley State	61
5	Jackson State	63
3	Southern	77
6	Grambling State	68
2	Alcorn State	98
7	Prairie View	55

Semifinals; March 11
1	Texas Southern	80
5	Jackson State	55
3	Southern	75
2	Alcorn State	87

Final; March 12
1	Texas Southern	69
2	Alcorn State	81
