= 1983 All-Pacific Coast men's basketball team =

The 1983 All-Pacific Coast men's basketball team consists of men's basketball players chosen by various organizations for the All-Pacific Coast teams in the 1982–83 NCAA Division I men's basketball season. Below are the UPI selections.

== Selections ==
=== First team ===
- Leon Wood Fullerton State 6–3, 185, Junior
- Byron Scott Arizona State 6–5, 195, Junior
- Sidney Green UNLV 6–9, 220, Senior
- Charlie Sitton Oregon State 6–8, 201, Junior
- Kenny Fields UCLA 6–7, 220, Junior

=== Second team ===
- Dane Suttle Pepperdine 6–3, 180, Senior
- Rod Foster UCLA 6–1, 152, Senior
- Michael Cage San Diego State 6–9, 225, Junior
- Steve Harriel Washington State 6-6, 215, Senior
- Chris McNealy San Jose State 6–7, Senior

=== Third team ===
- Danny Tarkanian UNLV 6–2, 185, Junior
- Billy Allen Nevada 6–1, 165, Senior
- Harold Keeling Santa Clara 6–3, 180, Sophomore
- Larry Anderson UNLV 6-6, 180, Senior
- Darren Daye UCLA 6–8, 220, Senior

== Coach of the Year ==
- Jerry Tarkanian UNLV

== Player of the Year ==
- Kenny Fields UCLA

== See also ==
- 1983 NCAA Men's Basketball All-Americans
