= 1983 MAAC men's basketball tournament =

- Classification: Division I
- Season: 1982–83
- Teams: 6
- First round site: Campus Sites; Campus Arenas
- Finals site: Meadowlands Arena; East Rutherford, NJ
- Champions: Fordham (1st title)
- Winning coach: Tom Penders (1st title)
- MVP: Mark Murphy (Fordham)

1982–83 MAAC men's basketball standings
	Conf.				Overall
Team	W		L	PCT	W		L	PCT
Iona	8	–	2	.800	22	–	9	.710
Fordham †	7	–	3	.700	19	–	11	.633
Saint Peter's	7	–	3	.700	22	–	5	.815
Manhattan	4	–	6	.400	15	–	13	.536
Army	2	–	8	.200	11	–	18	.379
Fairfield	2	–	8	.200	13	–	15	.464
† 1983 MAAC tournament winner Rankings from AP Poll

The 1983 MAAC men's basketball tournament was held March 10–12 at a combination of on-campus gymnasiums and the Meadowlands Arena in East Rutherford, New Jersey. This was the second edition of the tournament.

Fordham upset top-seeded Iona in the championship game, 54–53, to win their first MAAC men's basketball tournament.

No MAAC team was invited to the NCAA tournament this year.

== Format ==
All six of the conference's members participated in the tournament field. They were seeded based on regular season conference records, with the top two teams earning byes into the semifinal round. The other four teams entered into the preliminary first round. An additional third place game was also played on the last day of the tournament.

First Round games were played at the home court of the higher-seeded team. All remaining games were played at a neutral site at the Meadowlands Arena in East Rutherford, New Jersey.

== Bracket ==
First round Friday, March 10
4	Manhattan	69
5	Army	74
3	Saint Peter's	70
6	Fairfield	67

Semifinals; Saturday, March 11
1	Iona	65
5	Army	53
3	Saint Peter's	52
2	Fordham	66

Championship; Sunday, March 12
1	Iona	53
2	Fordham	54
