= 1982–83 UC Irvine Anteaters men's basketball team =

American college basketball season

1982–83 UC Irvine Anteaters men's basketball
- Conference: Pacific Coast Athletic Association
- Record: 16–12 (8–8 PCAA)
- Head coach: Bill Mulligan (3rd season)
- Assistant coaches: Mike Bokosky; Bob Schermerhorn
- Home arena: Crawford Hall

1982–83 Pacific Coast Athletic Association men's basketball standings
	Conf.				Overall
Team	W		L	PCT	W		L	PCT
No. 6 UNLV †	15	–	1	.938	28	–	3	.903
Cal State Fullerton	12	–	4	.750	21	–	8	.724
Utah State	10	–	6	.625	20	–	9	.690
Fresno State	9	–	7	.563	25	–	10	.714
UC Irvine	8	–	8	.500	16	–	12	.571
San Jose State	7	–	9	.438	14	–	15	.483
Long Beach State	6	–	10	.375	13	–	16	.448
Pacific	4	–	12	.250	7	–	21	.250
UC Santa Barbara	1	–	15	.063	7	–	20	.259
† 1983 PCAA tournament winner

The 1982–83 UC Irvine Anteaters men's basketball team represented the University of California, Irvine during the 1982–83 NCAA Division I men's basketball season. The Anteaters were led by third year head coach Bill Mulligan and played their home games at the Crawford Hall. They were members of the Pacific Coast Athletic Association. They finished the season 16–12 and 8–8 in PCAA play.

== Previous season ==
Led by All-American Kevin Magee, the 1981–82 Anteaters won a then program record 23 wins and finished 2nd in conference play, their best finish in program history. The anteaters were invited to the 1982 NIT tournament, their first division 1 post season invitation, where they defeated San Diego State in the first round and lost to Oklahoma in the second round.

== Off-season ==
=== Incoming transfers ===
Name	Pos.	Height	Weight	Year	Hometown	Notes
Michael Beans	G	6'2"	N/A	N/A	N/A	Junior College transfer from Long Beach City College
Jud Bearsley	G	6'5"	N/A	N/A	N/A	Junior College transfer from Cypress College
Troy Carmon	F	6'7"	N/A	N/A	N/A	Transfer from Colorado State
Mike Lopez	F	6'5"	N/A	Jr.	N/A	Junior College transfer from Los Angeles Valley College
George Turner	G	6'2"	N/A	Jr.	N/A	Junior College transfer from Saddleback College

=== 1981 recruiting class ===
College recruiting (1981)
Name	Hometown	School	Height	Weight	Commit date
Ken Bardsley; G	N/A	Costa Mesa High School (CA)	6 ft 4 in (1.93 m)	N/A	
Ken Bardsley; G	Recruit ratings: No ratings found				
Ronnie Grandison; F	Los Angeles, CA	St. Bernard High School (CA)	6 ft 7 in (2.01 m)	N/A	
Ronnie Grandison; F	Recruit ratings: No ratings found				
Tod Murphy; F	Lakewood, CA	Lakewood High School (CA)	6 ft 9 in (2.06 m)	220 lb (100 kg)	Apr 14, 1982
Tod Murphy; F	Recruit ratings: No ratings found				
Overall recruit ranking:
Note: In many cases, Scout, Rivals, 247Sports, On3, and ESPN may conflict in their listings of height and weight.; In these cases, the average was taken. ESPN grades are on a 100-point scale.; Sources:

== Roster ==
1981–82 UC Irvine Anteaters men's basketball team
Players
Coaches

Pos.	#	Name	Height	Weight	Year	Hometown
G		Ken Bardsley	6 ft 4 in (1.93 m)	—	Fr
G		Michael Beans	6 ft 2 in (1.88 m)	—	Jr
F		Troy Carmon	6 ft 6 in (1.98 m)	—
F		Ronnie Grandison	6 ft 6 in (1.98 m)	215 lb (98 kg)	Fr	Los Angeles, CA
F		Mike Lopez	6 ft 5 in (1.96 m)	—	Jr
F		Ben McDonald	6 ft 8 in (2.03 m)	210 lb (95 kg)	Jr	Torrance, CA
G		Brian Mulligan	5 ft 8 in (1.73 m)	—
C		Tod Murphy	6 ft 9 in (2.06 m)	220 lb (100 kg)	Fr	Lakewood, CA
		Mark Spinn	—	—
F		Bob Thornton	6 ft 10 in (2.08 m)	—
G		George Turner	6 ft 2 in (1.88 m)	—

Head coach

Bill Mulligan

Assistant coach(es)

- Bob Shermerhorn
- Mike Bokosky

Legend

- (C) Team captain
- (S) Suspended
- (I) Ineligible
- (W) Walk-on
- Injured
- Current redshirt

Roster
Last update: September 15, 2017

== Schedule ==
Date time, TV	Rank^{#}	Opponent^{#}	Result	Record	Site (attendance) city, state
Regular Season
November 29, 1982*		Oregon	W 46–44 ^{OT}	1–0	Anaheim Convention Center (2,198); Anaheim, CA
December 1, 1982*		San Diego	W 79–63	2–0	Crawford Hall (1,500); Irvine, CA
December 4, 1982*		Pepperdine	W 85–82	3–0	Anaheim Convention Center (2,495); Anaheim, CA
December 9, 1982*		at Loyola Marymount	W 85–73	4–0	Gersten Pavilion (1,656); Los Angeles, CA
December 14, 1982*		Chapman	W 104–88	5–0	Crawford Hall (1,339); Irvine, CA
December 18, 1982*		at Idaho	L 73–84	5–1	Cowan Spectrum (6,500); Moscow, ID
December 20, 1982		vs. Southwestern Louisiana; Wolf Pack Classic	L 67–81	5–2	Centennial Coliseum (1,800); Reno, NV
December 21, 1982*		vs. Gonzaga; Wolf Pack Classic	W 75–61	6–2	Centennial Coliseum (3,346); Reno, NV
December 29, 1982*		vs. Northern Arizona; KOA Classic	L 61–75	6–3	MetraPark Arena (4,108); Billings, MT
December 30, 1982*		vs. Eastern Montana; KOA Classic	W 89–73	7–3	MetraPark Arena (2,408); Billings, MT
January 6, 1983		at Cal State Fullerton	L 76–86	7–4 (0–1)	Titan Gym (4,310); Fullerton, CA
January 8, 1983		No. 11 UNLV	L 64–68	7–5 (0–2)	Long Beach Arena (4,229); Long Beach, CA
January 10, 1983*		Portland	W 90–74	8–5	Crawford Hall (1,032); Irvine, CA
January 15, 1983		San Jose State	L 78–81	8–6 (0–3)	San Jose Civic Auditorium (1,631); San Jose, CA
January 20, 1983		at UC Santa Barbara	W 82–76	9–6 (1–3)	UC Santa Barbara Events Center (2,102); Santa Barbara, CA
January 22, 1983		Fresno State	W 76–74	10–6 (2–3)	Anaheim Convention Center (2,744); Anaheim, CA
January 27, 1983		San Jose State	L 59–73	10–7 (2–4)	Crawford Hall (1,277); Irvine, CA
January 29, 1983		Utah State	W 78–76	11–7 (3–4)	Crawford Hall (1,469); Irvine, CA
February 3, 1983		at Long Beach State	L 87–95	11–8 (3–5)	Long Beach Arena (1,717); Long Beach, CA
February 5, 1983		at No. 2 UNLV	L 68–70	11–9 (3–6)	Las Vegas Convention Center (6,380); Winchester, NV
February 10, 1983		Cal State Fullerton	L 74–98	11–10 (3–7)	Anaheim Convention Center (3,967); Anaheim, CA
February 12, 1983		at Utah State	W 90–85	12–10 (4–7)	Smith Spectrum (9,302); Logan, UT
February 19, 1983		UC Santa Barbara	W 95–74	13–10 (5–7)	Crawford Hall (1,284); Irvine, CA
February 24, 1983		Pacific	W 78–76	14–10 (6–7)	Crawford Hall (1,171); Irvine, CA
February 26, 1983		Long Beach State	W 120–106	15–10 (7–7)	Crawford Hall (1,569); Irvine, CA
March 3, 1983		at Fresno State	L 57–67	15–11 (7–8)	Selland Arena (6,595); Fresno, CA
March 5, 1983		at Pacific	W 93–84	16–11 (8–8)	Alex G. Spanos Center (3,091); Stockton, CA
PCAA Conference tournament
March 10, 1983		vs. Fresno State; Quarterfinals	L 68–86	16–12	The Forum (9,717); Inglewood, CA
*Non-conference game. ^{#}Rankings from AP Poll. (#) Tournament seedings in parentheses. All times are in Pacific Time.

== Awards and honors ==
- Ben McDonald
  - PCAA First Team All-Conference
- Tod Murphy
  - PCAA All-Freshman Team

Source: Source
