= Don Corbett =

American basketball coach (1942–2018)

Biographical details
- Born: October 5, 1942; Columbus, Georgia, U.S.
- Died: September 12, 2018 (aged 75); Greensboro, North Carolina, U.S.
- Education: Lincoln University (MO)

Coaching career (HC unless noted)
- 1965–1967: Carver HS
- 1967–1968: South Carolina State (assistant)
- 1968–1971: Tennessee State (assistant)
- 1971–1979: Lincoln (MO)
- 1979–1993: North Carolina A&T

Head coaching record
- Overall: 413–204 (.669)
- Tournaments: 0–7 (NCAA Division I); 6–5 (NCAA Division II); 0–1 (NIT)

Accomplishments and honors

Championships
- 7 MEAC regular season (1981, 1982, 1984–1986, 1988, 1992); 7 MEAC tournament (1982–1988); 3 MIAA regular season (1972, 1975, 1977); MIAA tournament (1977)

Awards
- 6× MEAC Coach of the Year (1982–1986, 1988)

Don Corbett (October 5, 1942 – September 12, 2018) was an American college basketball coach for North Carolina A&T State University, where he led the program to seven NCAA tournament appearances from 1982 to 1988.

Corbett was born in Columbus, Georgia and raised in Thomasville. After graduating from Lincoln University in Jefferson City, Missouri and obtaining his master's degree from the University of Illinois at Urbana–Champaign, Corbett began his coaching career at Carver High School in Columbus, Georgia. After assistant coaching stints at South Carolina State and Tennessee State, he became head coach at Lincoln in 1971.

At NCAA Division II Lincoln, Corbett led his teams to an eight-year 159–59 record from 1971 to 1979. During that time, the Blue Tigers won three Mid-America Intercollegiate Athletics Association (MIAA) regular season championships (1972, 1975 and 1977) and one MIAA tournament title (1977). His teams earned five NCAA Division II tournament appearances (1972, 1975, 1976, 1977 and 1978) and never won fewer than 17 games in a season. Corbett's .729 winning percentage is the highest in program history. In 2014 he was named to the MIAA Hall of Fame.

In 1979, Corbett moved to Division I North Carolina A&T. After an initial rebuilding season where his Aggies went 8–19, Corbett's teams ran off a string of eight consecutive seasons winning either the Mid-Eastern Athletic Conference (MEAC) regular season or tournament championship (winning both in five seasons). The Aggies program won seven consecutive MEAC tournament titles between 1982 and 1988, a streak only equaled in Division I history by the Kentucky Wildcats. Corbett retired in 1993 with a 256–145 record in his thirteen seasons.

Corbett was inducted into several basketball halls of fame - including the MEAC Hall of Fame, the Guilford County Sports Hall of Fame, the MIAA Hall of Fame and the Lincoln University Athletic Hall of Fame. In 2006, North Carolina A&T named the court of the Corbett Sports Center after Corbett and fellow Aggie coaching great Cal Irvin.

Corbett died of cancer on September 12, 2018.

== Head coaching record ==
Record table
Season	Team	Overall	Conference	Standing	Postseason
Lincoln Blue Tigers (Mid-America Intercollegiate Athletics Association) (1971–1979)
1971–72	Lincoln	22–6	11–1	1st	NCAA College Division Sweet 16
1972–73	Lincoln	19–7	9–3		
1973–74	Lincoln	18–8	7–5		
1974–75	Lincoln	19–9	9–3	1st	NCAA Division II Sweet 16
1975–76	Lincoln	20–8	8–4		NCAA Division II First Round
1976–77	Lincoln	22–6	11–1	1st	NCAA Division II First Round
1977–78	Lincoln	22–6	9–3		NCAA Division II Elite Eight
1978–79	Lincoln	17–9	7–5		
Lincoln:		159–59 (.729)	71–25 (.740)		
North Carolina A&T Aggies (Mid-Eastern Athletic Conference) (1979–1993)
1979–80	North Carolina A&T	8–19	0–6	5th	
1980–81	North Carolina A&T	21–8	7–3	1st	NIT First Round
1981–82	North Carolina A&T	19–9	10–2	1st	NCAA Division I First Round
1982–83	North Carolina A&T	23–8	9–3	2nd	NCAA Division I Preliminary Round
1983–84	North Carolina A&T	22–7	9–1	1st	NCAA Division I Preliminary Round
1984–85	North Carolina A&T	19–10	10–2	1st	NCAA Division I First Round
1985–86	North Carolina A&T	22–8	12–2	1st	NCAA Division I First Round
1986–87	North Carolina A&T	24–6	12–2	2nd	NCAA Division I First Round
1987–88	North Carolina A&T	26–3	16–0	1st	NCAA Division I First Round
1988–89	North Carolina A&T	9–18	6–10	T–6th	
1989–90	North Carolina A&T	12–17	6–10	6th	
1990–91	North Carolina A&T	17–10	10–6	T–2nd	
1991–92	North Carolina A&T	18–9	11–4	T–1st	
1992–93	North Carolina A&T	14–13	9–7	T–2nd	
North Carolina A&T:		254–145 (.637)	127–58 (.686)		
Total:		413–204 (.669)			
National champion Postseason invitational champion Conference regular season champion Conference regular season and conference tournament champion Division regular season champion Division regular season and conference tournament champion Conference tournament champion
