= 1983 Pacific Coast Athletic Association men's basketball tournament =

- Classification: Division I
- Season: 1982–83
- Teams: 8
- Site: The Forum; Inglewood, CA
- Champions: UNLV (1st title)
- Winning coach: Jerry Tarkanian (1st title)
- MVP: Sidney Green (UNLV)
- Pacific Coast Athletic Association men's basketball tournaments

1982–83 Pacific Coast Athletic Association men's basketball standings
	Conf.				Overall
Team	W		L	PCT	W		L	PCT
No. 6 UNLV †	15	–	1	.938	28	–	3	.903
Cal State Fullerton	12	–	4	.750	21	–	8	.724
Utah State	10	–	6	.625	20	–	9	.690
Fresno State	9	–	7	.563	25	–	10	.714
UC Irvine	8	–	8	.500	16	–	12	.571
San Jose State	7	–	9	.438	14	–	15	.483
Long Beach State	6	–	10	.375	13	–	16	.448
Pacific	4	–	12	.250	7	–	21	.250
UC Santa Barbara	1	–	15	.063	7	–	20	.259
† 1983 PCAA tournament winner

The 1983 Pacific Coast Athletic Association men's basketball tournament (now known as the Big West Conference men's basketball tournament) was held March 10–12 at The Forum in Inglewood, California.

Top-seeded conference newcomers UNLV defeated two-time defending champions Fresno State in the final, 66–63 (OT), thus capturing the Runnin' Rebels' first PCAA/Big West title.

UNLV, in turn, received a bid to the 1983 NCAA tournament, the program's fourth appearance. PCAA third-place finisher Utah State also participated.

== Format ==
The tournament field increased by one from 1982 with the addition of UNLV to the PCAA. Nonetheless, conference member UC Santa Barbara again did not participate in the league tournament.

With eight teams participating, all eight teams were placed into the first round, with teams seeded and paired based on regular-season records. After the first round, teams were re-seeded so the highest-remaining team was paired with the lowest-remaining time in one semifinal with the other two teams slotted into the other semifinal.

== Bracket ==
First round Thursday, March 10
1	#9 UNLV	74
8	Pacific	67
5	UC Irvine	68
4	Fresno State	86
(Pairings are reseeded after the first round)
3	Utah State	66
6	San José State	80
7	Long Beach State	61
2	Cal State Fullerton	59

Semifinals; Friday, March 11
1	#9 UNLV	67
7	Long Beach State	64
6	San Jose State	47
4	Fresno State	53

Championship; Saturday, March 12
1	#9 UNLV	66*
4	Fresno State	63
