= 1982–83 North Carolina A&T Aggies men's basketball team =

American college basketball season

1982–83 North Carolina A&T Aggies men's basketball

MEAC tournament champions

NCAA tournament, Play-in Game
- Conference: Mid-Eastern Athletic Conference
- Record: 23–8 (9–3 MEAC)
- Head coach: Don Corbett (4th season)
- Home arena: Corbett Sports Center

1982–83 MEAC men's basketball standings
	Conf.				Overall
Team	W		L	PCT	W		L	PCT
Howard	11	–	1	.917	18	–	8	.692
North Carolina A&T †	9	–	3	.750	23	–	8	.742
South Carolina State	5	–	7	.417	13	–	15	.464
Maryland Eastern Shore	5	–	7	.417	10	–	19	.345
Delaware State	5	–	7	.417	8	–	19	.296
Florida A&M	4	–	8	.333	7	–	21	.250
Bethune–Cookman	3	–	9	.250	5	–	21	.192
† 1983 MEAC tournament winner Rankings from AP Poll

The 1982–83 North Carolina A&T Aggies men's basketball team represented North Carolina Agricultural and Technical State University during the 1982–83 NCAA Division I men's basketball season. The Aggies, led by fourth-year head coach Don Corbett, played their home games at the Corbett Sports Center as members of the Mid-Eastern Athletic Conference. They finished the season 23–8, 9–3 in MEAC play to finish in second place. They were champions of the MEAC tournament, winning the championship game over Morgan State, to earn an automatic bid to the 1983 NCAA tournament where they were defeated by Princeton, 53–41, in the play-in round.

== Roster ==
1982–83 North Carolina A&T Aggies men's basketball team
Players
Coaches

Pos.	#	Name	Height	Weight	Year	Hometown
F	25	Joe Binion	6 ft 8 in (2.03 m)	230 lb (104 kg)	Jr	Rochester, New York
G	34	Eric Boyd	6 ft 4 in (1.93 m)	—	So

Head coach

- Don Corbett

Assistant coach(es)

Legend

- (C) Team captain
- (S) Suspended
- (I) Ineligible
- (W) Walk-on
- Injured
- Current redshirt

== Schedule and results ==
Date time, TV	Rank^{#}	Opponent^{#}	Result	Record	Site (attendance) city, state
Regular season
Dec 3, 1982*		at No. 18 NC State	L 70–100	0–1	Reynolds Coliseum; Raleigh, North Carolina
Dec 6, 1982*		Mississippi Valley State	W 53–52	1–1	Corbett Sports Center; Greensboro, North Carolina
Dec 18, 1982*		at Jackson State	W 57–55	2–1	Williams Assembly Center; Jackson, Mississippi
Dec 20, 1982*		at Alabama State	L 70–77	2–2	Dunn Arena; Montgomery, Alabama
Jan 8, 1983		Howard	W 73–60	7–2 (1–0)	Corbett Sports Center; Greensboro, North Carolina
Jan 10, 1983		Delaware State	L 67–68	7–3 (1–1)	Corbett Sports Center; Greensboro, North Carolina
Jan 12, 1983*		at Tennessee State	W 67–58	8–3	Gentry Complex; Nashville, Tennessee
Jan 15, 1983		at Bethune-Cookman	W 67–59	9–3 (2–1)	Moore Gymnasium; Daytona Beach, Florida
Jan 17, 1983		at Florida A&M	L 57–59	9–4 (2–2)	Gaither Gymnasium; Tallahassee, Florida
Jan 20, 1983*		UNC Wilmington	W 65–53	10–4	Corbett Sports Center; Greensboro, North Carolina
Jan 22, 1983		South Carolina State	W 85–64	11–4 (3–2)	Corbett Sports Center; Greensboro, North Carolina
Jan 29, 1983*		Tennessee State	W 76–69	12–4	Corbett Sports Center; Greensboro, North Carolina
Jan 31, 1983		Maryland-Eastern Shore	W 79–70	13–4 (4–2)	Corbett Sports Center; Greensboro, North Carolina
Feb 4, 1983		at Howard	L 71–87	13–5 (4–3)	Burr Gymnasium; Washington, D.C.
Feb 5, 1983		at Delaware State	W 90–63	14–5 (5–3)	Memorial Hall; Dover, Delaware
Feb 7, 1983		at Maryland-Eastern Shore	W 87–73	15–5 (6–3)	Tawes Gymnasium; Princess Anne, Maryland
Feb 9, 1983*		at Virginia Tech	L 76–88	15–6	Cassell Coliseum; Blacksburg, Virginia
Feb 12, 1983		Florida A&M	W 94–67	16–6 (7–3)	Corbett Sports Center; Greensboro, North Carolina
Feb 14, 1983		Bethune-Cookman	W 73–68	17–6 (8–3)	Corbett Sports Center; Greensboro, North Carolina
Feb 18, 1983*		at UNC Wilmington	L 58–60	17–7	Trask Coliseum; Wilmington, North Carolina
Feb 19, 1983		at South Carolina State	W 97–68	18–7 (9–3)	SHM Memorial Center; Orangeburg, South Carolina
Feb 24, 1983*		Alabama State	W 105–86	19–7	Corbett Sports Center; Greensboro, North Carolina
Feb 28, 1983*		Jackson State	W 80–61	20–7	Corbett Sports Center; Greensboro, North Carolina
1983 MEAC tournament
Mar 10, 1983*		vs. Bethune-Cookman; Quarterfinals	W 80–73	21–7	Greensboro Coliseum; Greensboro, North Carolina
Mar 11, 1983*		vs. Maryland-Eastern Shore; Semifinals	W 81–74	22–7	Greensboro Coliseum; Greensboro, North Carolina
Mar 12, 1983*		vs. Howard; Championship game	W 71–64	23–7	Greensboro Coliseum; Greensboro, North Carolina
1983 NCAA tournament
Mar 15, 1983*	(12 W)	vs. (12 W) Princeton; Play-in Game	L 41–53	23–8	The Palestra; Philadelphia, Pennsylvania
*Non-conference game. ^{#}Rankings from AP Poll. (#) Tournament seedings in parentheses. ME=Mideast. All times are in Eastern Time.

== Awards and honors ==
- Joe Binion – MEAC Player of the Year
