= 1982–83 Utah State Aggies men's basketball team =

American college basketball season

1982–83 Utah State Aggies men's basketball

NCAA tournament, First Round
- Conference: Pacific Coast Athletic Association
- Record: 20–9 (10–6 PCAA)
- Head coach: Rod Tueller
- Home arena: Dee Glen Smith Spectrum

1982–83 Pacific Coast Athletic Association men's basketball standings
	Conf.				Overall
Team	W		L	PCT	W		L	PCT
No. 6 UNLV †	15	–	1	.938	28	–	3	.903
Cal State Fullerton	12	–	4	.750	21	–	8	.724
Utah State	10	–	6	.625	20	–	9	.690
Fresno State	9	–	7	.563	25	–	10	.714
UC Irvine	8	–	8	.500	16	–	12	.571
San Jose State	7	–	9	.438	14	–	15	.483
Long Beach State	6	–	10	.375	13	–	16	.448
Pacific	4	–	12	.250	7	–	21	.250
UC Santa Barbara	1	–	15	.063	7	–	20	.259
† 1983 PCAA tournament winner

The 1982–83 Utah State Aggies men's basketball team represented Utah State University as a member of the Pacific Coast Athletic Association during the 1982–83 men's college basketball season. They received an at-large bid to the NCAA Tournament where they lost in the first round to Iowa.

== Roster ==
1982–83 Utah State Aggies men's basketball team
Players
Coaches

Pos.	#	Name	Height	Weight	Year	Hometown
F	5	Greg Grant	6 ft 7 in (2.01 m)	195 lb (88 kg)	Fr	Salt Lake City, Utah
F	23	Ron Ence	6 ft 7 in (2.01 m)	—	Jr	Salt Lake City, Utah

Head coach

- Rod Tueller

Assistant coach(es)

Legend

- (C) Team captain
- (S) Suspended
- (I) Ineligible
- (W) Walk-on
- Injured
- Current redshirt

Roster

== Schedule and results ==
Date time, TV	Rank^{#}	Opponent^{#}	Result	Record	Site city, state
Regular season
Nov 30, 1982*		at BYU	W 75–69	1–0	Marriott Center; Provo, Utah
Dec 4, 1982*		at Weber State	L 57–83	1–1	Dee Events Center; Ogden, Utah
Dec 8, 1982*		Utah	W 86–65	2–1	Dee Glen Smith Spectrum; Logan, Utah
Mar 5, 1983		Long Beach State	W 81–76	20–7 (10–6)	Dee Glen Smith Spectrum; Logan, Utah
PCAA tournament
Mar 10, 1983*		vs. San Jose State; Quarterfinals	L 66–80	20–8	The Forum; Inglewood, California
NCAA Tournament
Mar 18, 1983*	(10 MW)	vs. (7 MW) Iowa; First round	L 59–64	20–9	Freedom Hall; Louisville, Kentucky
*Non-conference game. ^{#}Rankings from AP Poll. (#) Tournament seedings in parentheses.
