= 1982–83 Alcorn State Braves basketball team =

American college basketball season

1982–83 Alcorn State Braves basketball

SWAC tournament champions

NCAA tournament
- Conference: Southwestern Athletic Conference
- Record: 22–10 (10–4 SWAC)
- Head coach: Davey Whitney (14th season)
- Home arena: Physical Education Complex

1982–83 SWAC men's basketball standings
	Conf.				Overall
Team	W		L	PCT	W		L	PCT
Texas Southern	12	–	2	.857	22	–	7	.759
Alabama State	12	–	2	.857	22	–	6	.786
Alcorn State †	10	–	4	.714	22	–	10	.688
Southern	7	–	7	.500	16	–	14	.533
Mississippi Valley State	6	–	8	.429	11	–	17	.393
Jackson State	4	–	10	.286	6	–	24	.200
Grambling State	3	–	11	.214	6	–	22	.214
Prairie View A&M	2	–	12	.143	4	–	22	.154
† 1983 SWAC tournament winner Rankings from AP Poll

The 1982–83 Alcorn State Braves basketball team represented Alcorn State University during the 1982–83 NCAA Division I men's basketball season. The Braves, led by head coach Davey Whitney, played their home games at the Davey Whitney Complex and were members of the Southwestern Athletic Conference. They finished the season 22–10, 10–4 in SWAC. They won the SWAC tournament to receive an automatic bid to the NCAA tournament as one of two No. 12 seeds in the Midwest region. The Braves defeated Xavier 81–75, and then played No. 5 seed Georgetown tough before falling, 68–63.

== Roster ==
1982–83 Alcorn State Braves men's basketball team
Players	Coaches
Pos. / # / Name / Height / Weight / Year / Hometown; G / / Michael Phelps / 6 ft 4 in (1.93 m) / 180 lb (82 kg) / So / Vicksburg / Vicksburg, Mississippi	Head coach: Davey Whitney; Assistant coach(es) Legend: (C) Team captain; (S) Suspended; (I) Ineligible; (W) Walk-on; Injured; Current redshirt

== Schedule and results ==
Date time, TV	Rank^{#}	Opponent^{#}	Result	Record	Site (attendance) city, state
Regular season
Dec 3, 1982*		at Syracuse	L 77–110	0–1	Carrier Dome; Syracuse, New York
Dec 4, 1982*		vs. Boston University	W 74–72	1–1	Carrier Dome; Syracuse, New York
Dec 20, 1982*		at Kansas	L 72–86	3–3	Allen Fieldhouse; Lawrence, Kansas
SWAC tournament
Mar 10, 1983*		vs. Prairie View; Quarterfinals	W 98–55	17–9	Mississippi Coliseum; Jackson, Mississippi
Mar 11, 1983*		vs. Southern; Semifinals	W 87–75	18–9	Mississippi Coliseum; Jackson, Mississippi
Mar 12, 1983*		vs. Texas Southern; Championship game	W 81–69	19–9	Mississippi Coliseum; Jackson, Mississippi
NCAA tournament
Mar 15, 1983*	(12 MW)	vs. (12 MW) Xavier; Play-in game	W 81–75	22–9	University of Dayton Arena; Dayton, Ohio
Mar 18, 1983*	(12 MW)	vs. (5 MW) No. 20 Georgetown; First round	L 63–68	22–10	Freedom Hall (12,745); Louisville, Kentucky
*Non-conference game. ^{#}Rankings from AP Poll. (#) Tournament seedings in parentheses. MW=Midwest. All times are in Central Time.
