= Troy Lee Mikell =

American former basketball player (born 1960)

Personal information
- Born: 1960s Columbia, South Carolina, U.S.
- Listed height: 6 ft 1 in (1.85 m)
- Listed weight: 180 lb (82 kg)

Career information
- High school: Dreher (Columbia, South Carolina)
- College: East Tennessee State (1979–1983)
- NBA draft: 1983: 5th round, 105th overall pick
- Drafted by: New York Knicks
- Position: Shooting guard

Career highlights
- SoCon Player of the Year (1983); First-team All-SoCon (1983); 2× Second-team All-SoCon (1981, 1982); SoCon Freshman of the Year (1980)
- Stats at Basketball Reference

Troy Lee Mikell (born 1960s) is an American former basketball player. He was a draft pick in the 1983 NBA draft by the New York Knicks (5th round, 105th overall) after a four-year collegiate career at East Tennessee State University (ETSU). Mikell, at 6'1" and 180 pounds, played forward in high school but shooting guard in college.

During Mikell's ETSU career with the Buccaneers, he scored 1,684 points, made 637 field goals and shot 55% from the field. As a freshman in 1979–80 he averaged 16.5 points per game and was named the Southern Conference (SoCon) Freshman of the Year, narrowly edging out Western Carolina's Ronnie Carr for the honor. Over his final three seasons Mikell garnered two Second Team All-SoCon and one First Team All-SoCon honors; in his senior season of 1982–83 he was also named the Southern Conference Player of the Year. That year, he averaged 18.3 points per game behind 67.5% field goal shooting as he led ETSU to a berth in the 1983 National Invitation Tournament. He was also Sports Illustrated's national player of the week in March 1983.

After being drafted by the Knicks in the NBA Draft, Mikell was later cut prior to the start of the 1983–84 NBA season.
