= Jay Arnote =

American college basketball coach

Playing career
- 1968–1971: Arizona State

Coaching career (HC unless noted)
- 1981–1983: Grand Canyon
- 1983–1988: Northern Arizona

Head coaching record
- Overall: 70–72

Jay Arnote is an American college basketball coach. He was the head coach at Grand Canyon University from 1981 to 1983 and at Northern Arizona University from 1983 to 1988.
