= Ben Lindsey (basketball) =

American collegiate basketball coach

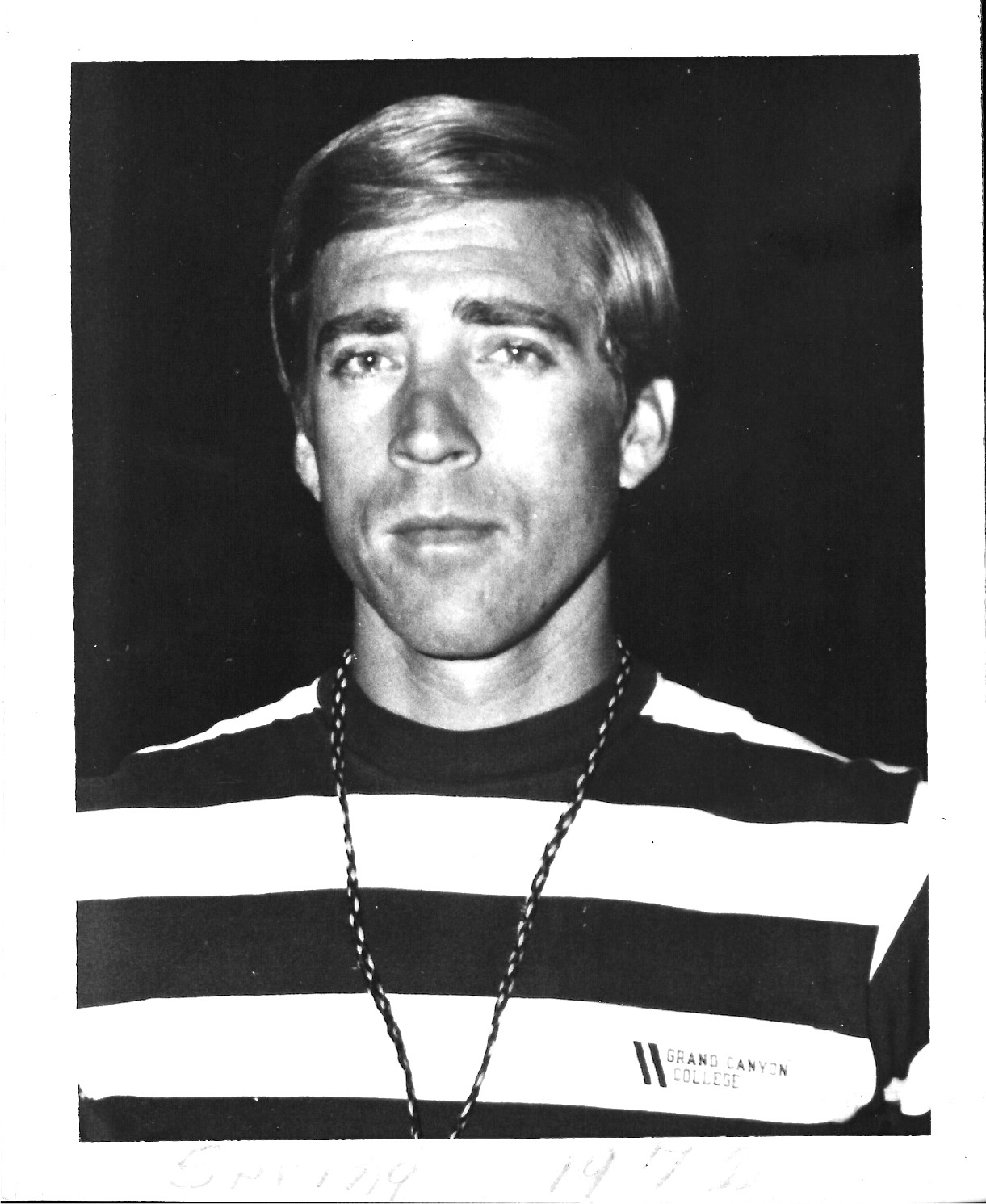
- Lindsey in 1972

Playing career
- ?–?: Pasadena Nazarene

Coaching career (HC unless noted)
- 1965–1980: Grand Canyon
- 1982–1983: Arizona

Head coaching record
- Overall: 321–161 (.666)

Accomplishments and honors

Championships
- 2× NAIA Division I (1975, 1978); 6× NAIA District VII (1973–1976, 1979, 1980)

Ben Lindsey (born c. 1939) is an American collegiate basketball coach. During his sixteen years (1965–1980 and 1982–83) as head coach of Grand Canyon College in Phoenix, Arizona, he accumulated a 317–137 (.698) record and won two NAIA championships.

== Playing career ==
=== High school ===
Lindsey attended Phoenix Union High School for two years where he was a three sport letterman (football, basketball and baseball). He transferred to Phoenix Christian High School for his final two years where he again was a three sport letterman.

=== College ===
In 1957, Lindsey began his college career at Pasadena Nazarene College where he played basketball and baseball and earned Freshman Athlete of the Year honors. In 1959, Lindsey transferred to Grand Canyon College (GCC) where he played three seasons of basketball and two seasons of baseball. Considered one of the top small college basketball players (Who's Who of Small College Basketball) at the time, he set five basketball scoring records, one of which remains to this day; that is, most field goals in a single game – 18.

== Coaching career ==
=== College ===
==== Grand Canyon College (GCC) ====
Lindsey was hired by GCC Athletic Director, Dave Brazell, as the Head Basketball Coach in the Spring of 1965. At the time, GCC was a small Southern Baptist college with an enrollment of approximately 500. The basketball program's total budget at the time was $2,000 with no recruiting budget. Coach Lindsey had no assistant coach and, in addition to head coach, was the trainer, statistician, recruiter, academic advisor, hired officials, arranged score and clock keepers, swept the gym floor, and performed every other necessary role. In fact, his wife Jerri washed the team uniforms. It was not uncommon to visit the Lindsey household and see stacks of GCC basketball uniforms and warm-ups. As part of his GCC job, he had to teach 12 hours of classes (e.g., archery, golf, and kinesiology) per semester and also coached the tennis team.

Lindsey's post-season record was 30–9. He won the NAIA District VII Championship in 1973, 1974, 1975, 1976, 1979, and 1980. He won two NAIA National Championships in 1975 and 1978. His team also earned the 1975 tournament Sportsmanship Award...the only team to ever win the championship and sportsmanship award in the same year. GCC was the smallest college to ever win the NAIA Championship.

Lindsey was the first head basketball coach at an Arizona college or university to win a national championship. He is the only head coach in Arizona history to win two national championships. In addition, he was the youngest college/university coach to reach 300 wins, which he accomplished at age 40.

Lindsey produced five All-Americans and had three NBA draft picks.

==== GCC Coaching Record ====
Record table
Season	Team	Overall	Conference	Standing	Postseason
1965–66	Grand Canyon	11–13			
1966–67	Grand Canyon	14–13			
1967–68	Grand Canyon	11–13			
1968–69	Grand Canyon	14–11			
1969–70	Grand Canyon	21–6			NAIA District VII Playoffs
1970–71	Grand Canyon	10–17			
1971–72	Grand Canyon	17–12			NAIA District VII Playoffs
1972–73	Grand Canyon	19–10		NAIA District VII Champs	NAIA National Tournament
1973–74	Grand Canyon	28–2		NAIA District VII Champs	NAIA National Tournament
1974–75	Grand Canyon	30–3		NAIA District VII Champs	NAIA Champion
1975–76	Grand Canyon	27–3		NAIA District VII Champs	NAIA National Tournament
1976–77	Grand Canyon	20–9			NAIA District VII Playoffs
1977–78	Grand Canyon	30–3		NAIA District VII Champs	NAIA Champion
1978–79	Grand Canyon	24–4		NAIA District VII Champs	NAIA National Tournament
1979–80	Grand Canyon	25–5		NAIA District VII Champs	NAIA National Tournament
Total:		301–128			
National champion Postseason invitational champion Conference regular season champion Conference regular season and conference tournament champion Division regular season champion Division regular season and conference tournament champion Conference tournament champion

==== Fort Hays State University (FHSU) ====
Lindsey was hired by Fort Hays State in Kansas in 1982 to a four-year contract, with the understanding that he would be released from it if he was offered and accepted the University of Arizona head coaching job.

==== University of Arizona (UA) ====
Lindsey was hired by the University of Arizona of the Pac-10 Conference in April 1982, just a few days prior to national letter of intent day. He inherited a 9–18 team from the prior season, and had just lost its best player (Jeff Collins) via transfer to UNLV. Lindsey remains the only native Arizonan ever to be hired as a head coach in basketball or football at the three state universities.

Lindsey was dismissed immediately after his first season; the Wildcats won just once in the Pac-10 and were 4–24 (.143) overall, the worst record in school history. He filed a $3 million wrongful termination suit against the school, claiming that he had received a verbal contract promising a minimum of four years to improve the school's basketball program. Lindsey prevailed in his legal battle and was awarded $695,000 in damages. This award was later trimmed and the former coach collected $215,000.

He was succeeded by Lute Olson, formerly the head coach at Iowa in the Big Ten Conference for nine seasons. Three years earlier, the 1980 Hawkeyes reached the Final Four of the NCAA tournament.

=== International experience ===
1975 – Assistant Coach for NAIA All Star team exhibition series with Mexican Olympic team in Mexico City.

1978 – GCC was chosen to represent the NAIA to play four exhibition games in Argentina.

1981 – Assistant coach for Philippines men's national basketball team.

== Honors ==
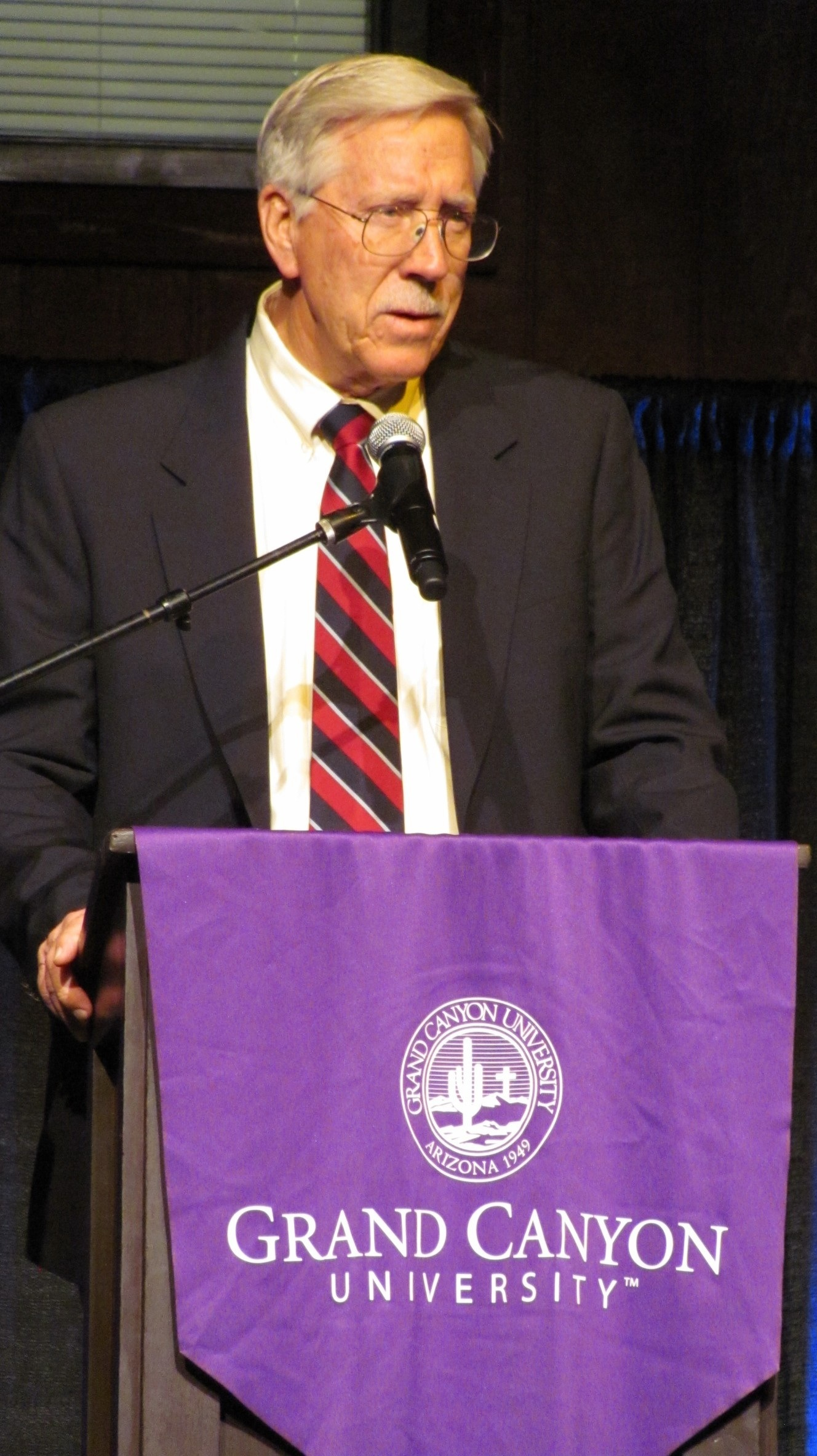
GCU Hall of Fame induction ceremony in 2010

- Charles Kriegel Award (1975) – given to the coach of the team that wins the sportsmanship award during the NAIA National Championship tournament.
- Kodak Basketball Coach of the Year Nominee – 1975
- Arizona Pressbox Association Coach of the Year – 1975
- Arizona Pressbox Association Coach of the Year – 1978
- National Basketball Coaches Association District VII Coach of the Year – 1975
- National Basketball Coaches Association District VII Coach of the Year – 1978
- Selected to coach West Basketball Team at the 1978 USA Olympic Festival
- NAIA District VII Basketball Coach of the Year – 1973, 1974
- NAIA Area II Basketball Coach of the Year – 1973, 1974
- Inducted into Grand Canyon University Athletics Hall of Fame – as a Coach and as a Student/Athlete – 2010
