= Oklahoma State Cowboys basketball statistical leaders =

The Oklahoma State Cowboys basketball statistical leaders are individual statistical leaders of the Oklahoma State Cowboys basketball program in various categories, including points, assists, blocks, rebounds, and steals. Within those areas, the lists identify single-game, single-season, and career leaders. The Cowboys represent Oklahoma State University in the NCAA's Big 12 Conference.

Oklahoma State began competing in intercollegiate basketball in 1907. However, the school's record book does not generally list records from before the 1950s, as records from before this period are often incomplete and inconsistent. Since scoring was much lower in this era, and teams played much fewer games during a typical season, it is likely that few or no players from this era would appear on these lists anyway.

The NCAA did not officially record assists as a stat until the 1983–84 season, and blocks and steals until the 1985–86 season, but Oklahoma State's record books includes players in these stats before these seasons. These lists are updated through the end of the 2020–21 season.

== Scoring ==
Career
Rk	Player	Points	Seasons
1	Byron Houston	2,379	1988–89 1989–90 1990–91 1991–92
2	Bryant Reeves	2,367	1991–92 1992–93 1993–94 1994–95
3	Adrian Peterson	1,866	1995–96 1996–97 1997–98 1998–99
4	Le'Bryan Nash	1,839	2011–12 2012–13 2013–14 2014–15
5	James Anderson	1,811	2007–08 2008–09 2009–10
6	Phil Forte	1,746	2012–13 2013–14 2014–15 2015–16 2016–17
7	Desmond Mason	1,702	1996–97 1997–98 1998–99 1999–00
8	Bob Kurland	1,669	1942–43 1943–44 1944–45 1945–46
9	Markel Brown	1,655	2010–11 2011–12 2012–13 2013–14
10	Keiton Page	1,651	2008–09 2009–10 2010–11 2011–12

Season
Rk	Player	Points	Season
1	Bryant Reeves	797	1994–95
2	James Anderson	735	2009–10
3	Byron Houston	726	1990–91
4	Randy Rutherford	724	1994–95
5	Bryant Reeves	713	1993–94
6	Byron Houston	688	1991–92
7	Ed Odom	654	1979–80
8	Mario Boggan	647	2006–07
9	Bob Kurland	643	1945–46
10	James Anderson	638	2008–09

Single game
Rk	Player	Points	Season	Opponent
1	Bob Kurland	58	1945–46	St. Louis
2	Randy Rutherford	45	1994–95	Kansas
3	Jawun Evans	42	2015–16	Oklahoma
	Arlen Clark	42	1958–59	Colorado
5	Ed Odom	41	1979–80	Texas-Pan American
6	Cade Cunningham	40	2020–21	Oklahoma
	Keiton Page	40	2011–12	Texas
	JamesOn Curry	40	2006–07	Baylor

== Rebounds ==
Career
Rk	Player	Rebounds	Seasons
1	Byron Houston	1,189	1988–89 1989–90 1990–91 1991–92
2	Bryant Reeves	1,152	1991–92 1992–93 1993–94 1994–95
3	Andy Hopson	1,020	1972–73 1973–74 1974–75
4	Ivan McFarlin	978	2001–02 2002–03 2003–04 2004–05
5	Olus Holder	900	1974–75 1975–76 1976–77 1977–78
6	Desmond Mason	795	1996–97 1997–98 1998–99 1999–00
7	Bob Mattick	772	1951–52 1952–53 1953–54
8	Leroy Combs	763	1979–80 1980–81 1981–82 1982–83
9	James King	761	1962–63 1963–64 1964–65
10	Fredrik Jönzén	744	1998–99 1999–00 2000–01 2001–02

Season
Rk	Player	Rebounds	Season
1	Andy Hopson	375	1973–74
2	Andy Hopson	352	1972–73
3	Bryant Reeves	350	1994–95
4	Byron Houston	336	1990–91
5	Bryant Reeves	329	1993–94
6	Bob Mattick	326	1953–54
7	Byron Houston	309	1989–90
8	Byron Houston	294	1991–92
9	Andy Hopson	293	1974–75
10	Bryant Reeves	291	1992–93

Single game
Rk	Player	Rebounds	Season	Opponent
1	Andy Hopson	27	1972–73	Missouri
2	Andy Hopson	25	1972–73	Oklahoma
3	Andy Hopson	24	1973–74	Nebraska

== Assists ==
Career
Rk	Player	Assists	Seasons
1	Doug Gottlieb	793	1997–98 1998–99 1999–00
2	Byron Eaton	545	2005–06 2006–07 2007–08 2008–09
3	Isaac Likekele	441	2018–19 2019–20 2020–21 2021–22
4	Matt Clark	432	1978–79 1979–80 1980–81 1981–82 1982–83
5	Joe Adkins	430	1996–97 1997–98 1998–99 1999–00
6	Randy Wright	427	1977–78 1978–79 1979–80 1980–81
7	Darwyn Alexander	420	1988–89 1989–90 1990–91 1991–92
8	Andre Owens	397	1994–95 1995–96
9	JamesOn Curry	356	2004–05 2005–06 2006–07
10	Corey Williams	349	1988–89 1989–90 1990–91 1991–92

Season
Rk	Player	Assists	Season
1	Doug Gottlieb	299	1998–99
2	Doug Gottlieb	293	1999–00
3	Andre Owens	256	1994–95
3	Jawun Evans	204	2016–17
5	Doug Gottlieb	201	1997–98
	Matt Clark	201	1982–83
7	Byron Eaton	199	2008–09
8	Brooks Thompson	195	1993–94
9	Sean Sutton	167	1991–92
10	John Lucas	158	2003–04

Single game
Rk	Player	Assists	Season	Opponent
1	Doug Gottlieb	18	1998–99	Florida Atlantic
2	Doug Gottlieb	16	1999–00	North Texas
	Randy Wright	16	1979–80	Texas-Pan American

== Steals ==
Career
Rk	Player	Steals	Seasons
1	Byron Eaton	267	2005–06 2006–07 2007–08 2008–09
2	Marcus Smart	188	2012–13 2013–14
3	Terrel Harris	173	2005–06 2006–07 2007–08 2008–09
4	Ivan McFarlin	170	2001–02 2002–03 2003–04 2004–05
5	Brooks Thompson	169	1992–93 1993–94
6	Darwyn Alexander	167	1988–89 1989–90 1990–91 1991–92
7	Phil Forte	164	2012–13 2013–14 2014–15 2015–16 2016–17
8	Isaac Likekele	160	2018–19 2019–20 2020–21 2021–22
9	Byron Houston	159	1988–89 1989–90 1990–91 1991–92
10	Victor Williams	158	2000–01 2001–02 2002–03
	Desmond Mason	158	1996–97 1997–98 1998–99 1999–00

Season
Rk	Player	Steals	Season
1	Marcus Smart	99	2012–13
	Brooks Thompson	99	1993–94
3	Marcus Smart	89	2013–14
4	Cornell Hatcher	86	1991–92
5	Arturo Dean	84	2024–25
6	Andre Owens	79	1994–95
7	Byron Eaton	77	2008–09
8	Tony Allen	72	2003–04
9	Brooks Thompson	70	1992–93
10	Byron Eaton	69	2007–08
	Randy Rutherford	69	1994–95
	Richard Dumas	69	1988–89

Single game
Rk	Player	Steals	Season	Opponent
1	Marcus Smart	9	2013–14	Utah Valley
2	Desmond Mason	8	1998–99	Houston Baptist
	Brooks Thompson	8	1992–93	Colorado

== Blocks ==
Career
Rk	Player	Blocks	Seasons
1	Byron Houston	222	1988–89 1989–90 1990–91 1991–92
2	Joe Atkinson	215	1981–82 1982–83 1983–84 1984–85
3	Andre Williams	214	1999–00 2000–01 2001–02 2002–03
4	Bryant Reeves	194	1991–92 1992–93 1993–94 1994–95
5	Leroy Combs	167	1979–80 1980–81 1981–82 1982–83
6	Michael Cobbins	164	2011–12 2012–13 2013–14 2014–15
7	Ivan McFarlin	156	2001–02 2002–03 2003–04 2004–05
8	Kalib Boone	147	2019–20 2020–21 2021–22 2022–23
9	Yor Anei	145	2018–19 2019–20
10	Moussa Cisse	116	2021–22 2022–23

Season
Rk	Player	Blocks	Season
1	Yor Anei	85	2018–19
	Andre Williams	85	2002–03
3	Joe Atkinson	80	1983–84
4	Bryant Reeves	70	1993–94
5	Joe Atkinson	67	1984–85
6	Andre Williams	65	2000–01
	Byron Houston	65	1989–90
	Byron Houston	65	1988–89
9	Moussa Cisse	62	2022–23
10	Bryant Reeves	60	1994–95
	Yor Anei	60	2019–20

Single game
Rk	Player	Blocks	Season	Opponent
1	Joe Atkinson	10	1984–85	New Orleans
2	Yor Anei	8	2019–20	Oral Roberts
	Yor Anei	8	2018–19	West Virginia
	Andre Williams	8	2002–03	Wichita State
