= List of Oklahoma State Cowboys basketball seasons =

This is a list of seasons completed by the Oklahoma State Cowboys men's college basketball team.

== Seasons ==
Statistics overview
Season	Team	Overall	Conference	Standing	Postseason
Boyd Hill (Independent) (1907–1908)
1907–08	Boyd Hill	2–3			
Boyd Hill:		2–3			
William Schreiber (Independent) (1908–1910)
1908–09	William Schreiber	1–2			
1909–10	William Schreiber	3–3			
William Schreiber:		4–5			
Paul Davis (Independent) (1911–1915)
1911–12	William Schreiber	2–6			
1912–13	William Schreiber	3–6			
1914–15	William Schreiber	10–4			
Paul Davis:		15–16			
John Griffith (Independent) (1915–1917)
1915–16	John Griffith	7–8			
1916–17	John Griffith	11–4			
John Griffith:		18–12			
Earl Pritchard (Southwest Conference) (1917–1918)
1917–18	Earl Pritchard	6–10	1–4	5th	
Earl Pritchard (Independent) (1918–1919)
1918–19	Earl Pritchard	5–5			
Earl Pritchard:		11–15	1–4		
James Pixlee (Independent) (1919–1921)
1919–20	James Pixlee	1–12			
1920–21	James Pixlee	2–9			
James Pixlee:		3–21			
John Maulbetsch (Southwest Conference) (1921–1925)
1921–22	John Maulbetsch	5–16	1–4	5th	
1922–23	John Maulbetsch	12–11	7–8	T–3rd	
1923–24	John Maulbetsch	14–6	9–5	T–3rd	
1924–25	John Maulbetsch	15–3	12–2	1st	
John Maulbetsch (Missouri Valley Conference) (1925–1929)
1925–26	John Maulbetsch	9–9	5–7	8th	
1926–27	John Maulbetsch	8–9	6–6	T–5th	
1927–28	John Maulbetsch	11–7	11–7	3rd	
1928–29	John Maulbetsch	1–14	0–4	4th	
John Maulbetsch:		75–74	51–43		
George Rody (Missouri Valley Conference) (1929–1931)
1929–30	George Rody	1–15	0–8	5th	
1930–31	George Rody	7–9	5–3	T–1st	
George Rody:		8–24	5–11		
Puny James (Missouri Valley Conference) (1931–1934)
1931–32	Puny James	4–15	2–6	T–4th	
1932–33	Puny James	5–12	3–7	T–4th	
1933–34	Puny James	4–14	1–9	6th	
Puny James:		13–42	6–22		
Henry Iba (Missouri Valley Conference) (1934–1958)
1934–35	Henry Iba	9–9	5–7	5th	
1935–36	Henry Iba	16–8	9–4	T–1st	
1936–37	Henry Iba	19–3	11–1	1st	
1937–38	Henry Iba	25–3	13–1	1st	NIT Third Place
1938–39	Henry Iba	19–8	11–3	1st	
1939–40	Henry Iba	26–3	12–0	1st	NIT Third Place
1940–41	Henry Iba	18–7	8–4	2nd	
1941–42	Henry Iba	20–6	9–1	T–1st	
1942–43	Henry Iba	14–10	7–3	T–2nd	
1943–44	Henry Iba	27–6		1st^{[Note A]}	NIT Fourth Place
1944–45	Henry Iba	27–4		1st^{[Note A]}	NCAA Champion
1945–46	Henry Iba	31–2	12–0	1st	NCAA Champion
1946–47	Henry Iba	24–8	8–4	T–2nd	
1947–48	Henry Iba	27–4	10–0	T–1st	
1948–49	Henry Iba	23–5	9–1	1st	NCAA Runner-Up
1949–50	Henry Iba	18–9	7–5	3rd	
1950–51	Henry Iba	29–6	12–2	1st	NCAA Final Four
1951–52	Henry Iba	19–8	9–3	2nd	
1952–53	Henry Iba	23–7	8–2	1st	NCAA Elite Eight
1953–54	Henry Iba	24–5	9–1	1st	NCAA Elite Eight
1954–55	Henry Iba	12–13	5–5	3rd	
1955–56	Henry Iba	18–9	8–4	2nd	NIT First Round
1956–57	Henry Iba	17–9	8–6	3rd	
1957–58	Henry Iba	21–8	–	–	NCAA University Division Elite Eight
Henry Iba (Big Eight Conference) (1958–1970)
1958–59	Henry Iba	11–14	5–9	5th	
1959–60	Henry Iba	10–15	4–10	7th	
1960–61	Henry Iba	14–11	8–6	3rd	
1961–62	Henry Iba	14–11	7–7	4th	
1962–63	Henry Iba	16–9	7–7	5th	
1963–64	Henry Iba	15–10	7–7	4th	
1964–65	Henry Iba	20–7	12–2	1st	NCAA University Division Elite Eight
1965–66	Henry Iba	4–21	2–12	7th	
1966–67	Henry Iba	7–18	2–12	7th	
1967–68	Henry Iba	10–16	3–11	7th	
1968–69	Henry Iba	12–13	5–9	6th	
1969–70	Henry Iba	14–12	5–9	7th	
Henry Iba:		655–317	257–152		
Sam Aubrey (Big Eight Conference) (1970–1973)
1970–71	Sam Aubrey	7–19	2–12	8th	
1971–72	Sam Aubrey	4–22	2–12	8th	
1972–73	Sam Aubrey	7–19	3–11	8th	
Sam Aubrey:		18–60	7–35		
Guy R. Strong (Big Eight Conference) (1973–1977)
1973–74	Guy R. Strong	9–17	3–11	7th	
1974–75	Guy R. Strong	10–16	5–9	6th	
1975–76	Guy R. Strong	10–16	4–10	6th	
1976–77	Guy R. Strong	6–21	4–10	7th	
Guy R. Strong:		35–70	16–40		
Jim Killingsworth (Big Eight Conference) (1977–1979)
1977–78	Jim Killingsworth	10–16	4–10	6th	
1978–79	Jim Killingsworth	12–15	5–9	7th	
Jim Killingsworth:		22–31	9–19		
Paul Hansen (Big Eight Conference) (1979–1986)
1979–80	Paul Hansen	10–17	4–10	8th	
1980–81	Paul Hansen	18–9	8–6	5th	
1981–82	Paul Hansen	15–12	7–7	5th	
1982–83	Paul Hansen	24–7	9–5	3rd	NCAA Division I First Round
1983–84	Paul Hansen	13–15	5–9	7th	
1984–85	Paul Hansen	12–16	3–11	8th	
1985–86	Paul Hansen	15–13	6–8	6th	
Paul Hansen:		107–89	42–56		
Leonard Hamilton (Big Eight Conference) (1986–1990)
1986–87	Leonard Hamilton	8–20	4–10	7th	
1987–88	Leonard Hamilton	14–16	4–10	6th	
1988–89	Leonard Hamilton	17–13	7–7	4th	
1989–90	Leonard Hamilton	17–14	6–8	5th	
Leonard Hamilton:		56–63	21–35		
Eddie Sutton (Big Eight Conference) (1990–1996)
1990–91	Eddie Sutton	24–8	9–4	1st	NCAA Division I Sweet Sixteen
1991–92	Eddie Sutton	28–8	8–6	2nd	NCAA Division I Sweet Sixteen
1992–93	Eddie Sutton	20–9	8–6	2nd	NCAA Division I Second Round
1993–94	Eddie Sutton	24–10	10–4	2nd	NCAA Division I Second Round
1994–95	Eddie Sutton	27–10	10–4	2nd	NCAA Division I Final Four
1995–96	Eddie Sutton	17–10	7–7	4th	
Eddie Sutton (Big 12 Conference) (1996–2006)
1996–97	Eddie Sutton	17–15	7–9	6th	NIT Second Round
1997–98	Eddie Sutton	22–7	11–5	T–2nd	NCAA Division I Second Round
1998–99	Eddie Sutton	23–11	10–6	5th	NCAA Division I Second Round
1999–00	Eddie Sutton	27–7	12–4	T–3rd	NCAA Division I Elite Eight
2000–01	Eddie Sutton	20–10	10–6	5th	NCAA Division I First Round
2001–02	Eddie Sutton	23–9	10–6	T–3rd	NCAA Division I First Round
2002–03	Eddie Sutton	22–10	10–6	4th	NCAA Division I Second Round
2003–04	Eddie Sutton	31–4	14–2	1st	NCAA Division I Final Four
2004–05	Eddie Sutton	26–7	11–5	3rd	NCAA Division I Sweet Sixteen
2005–06	Eddie Sutton	17–16	6–10	7th	NIT First Round
Eddie Sutton:		368–151	153–90		
Sean Sutton (Big 12 Conference) (2006–2008)
2006–07	Sean Sutton	22–13	6–10	T–7th	NIT First Round
2007–08	Sean Sutton	17–16	7–9	T–7th	NIT First Round
Sean Sutton:		39–29	13–26		
Travis Ford (Big 12 Conference) (2008–2016)
2008–09	Travis Ford	23–12	9–7	T–4th	NCAA Division I Second Round
2009–10	Travis Ford	22–11	9–7	T–6th	NCAA Division I First Round
2010–11	Travis Ford	20–13	6–10	9th	NIT Second Round
2011–12	Travis Ford	15–18	7–11	7th	
2012–13	Travis Ford	24–9	13–5	3rd	NCAA Division I Second Round
2013–14	Travis Ford	21–13	8–10	8th	NCAA Division I Second Round
2014–15	Travis Ford	18–14	8–10	6th	NCAA Division I Second Round
2015–16	Travis Ford	12–20	3–15	9th	
Travis Ford:		137–96	55–65		
Brad Underwood (Big 12 Conference) (2016–2017)
2016–17	Brad Underwood	20–13	9–9	5th	NCAA Division I First Round
Brad Underwood:		20–13	9–9		
Mike Boynton (Big 12 Conference) (2017–2024)
2017–18	Mike Boynton	21–15	8–10	6th	NIT Quarterfinals
2018–19	Mike Boynton	12–20	5–13	9th	
2019–20	Mike Boynton	18–14	7–11	T–7th	No postseason held
2020–21	Mike Boynton	21–9	11–7	5th	NCAA Division I Second Round
2021–22	Mike Boynton	15–15	8–10	T–5th	Ruled ineligible from postseason play by the NCAA
2022–23	Mike Boynton	20–16	8–10	7th	NIT Quarterfinals
2023–24	Mike Boynton	12–20	4–14	T–13th	
Mike Boynton:		119–109	51–75		
Steve Lutz (Big 12 Conference) (2024–present)
2024–25	Steve Lutz	17–18	7–13	12th	NIT Quarterfinals
2025–26	Steve Lutz	20–15	6–12	T–13th	NIT Second Round
Total:		1,746–1,251			
National champion Postseason invitational champion Conference regular season champion Conference regular season and conference tournament champion Division regular season champion Division regular season and conference tournament champion Conference tournament champion

^A. Voted 1st in Missouri Valley Conference in 1944 and 1945 as there was no league play due to World War II
