= List of Oklahoma State Cowboys basketball head coaches =

The following is a list of Oklahoma State Cowboys basketball head coaches. There have been 21 head coaches of the Cowboys in their 114-season history.

Oklahoma State's current head coach is Mike Boynton. He was hired in March 2017, replacing Brad Underwood, who left to become the head coach at Illinois.

| No. | Tenure | Coach | Years | Record | Pct. |
|---|---|---|---|---|---|
| 1 | 1907–1908 | Boyd Hill | 1 | 2–3 | .400 |
| 2 | 1908–1910 | William Schrieber | 2 | 4–5 | .444 |
| 3 | 1911–1915 (Note: Oklahoma State did not field a team for the 1913–14 season.) | Paul J. Davis | 3 | 15–16 | .484 |
| 4 | 1915–1917 | John G. Griffith | 2 | 18–12 | .600 |
| 5 | 1917–1919 | Earl A. Pritchard | 2 | 11–15 | .423 |
| 6 | 1919–1921 | Jim Pixlee | 2 | 3–21 | .125 |
| 7 | 1921–1929 | John Maulbetsch | 8 | 75–75 | .500 |
| 8 | 1929–1931 | George E. Rody | 2 | 8–24 | .250 |
| 9 | 1931–1934 | Harold James | 3 | 13–42 | .236 |
| 10 | 1934–1970 | Henry Iba | 36 | 653–317 | .673 |
| 11 | 1970–1973 | Sam Aubrey | 3 | 18–60 | .231 |
| 12 | 1973–1977 | Guy R. Strong | 4 | 39–66 | .371 |
| 13 | 1977–1979 | Jim Killingsworth | 2 | 22–31 | .415 |
| 14 | 1979–1986 | Paul Hansen | 7 | 107–89 | .546 |
| 15 | 1986–1990 | Leonard Hamilton | 4 | 56–63 | .471 |
| 16 | 1990–2006 | Eddie Sutton | 16 | 368–151 | .709 |
| 17 | 2006–2008 | Sean Sutton | 2 | 39–29 | .574 |
| 18 | 2008–2016 | Travis Ford | 8 | 155–111 | .583 |
| 19 | 2016–2017 | Brad Underwood | 1 | 20–13 | .606 |
| 20 | 2017–2024 | Mike Boynton | 6 | 107–89 | .546 |
| 21 | 2024–present | Steve Lutz | 0 | 0–0 | – |
| Totals | | 20 coaches | 114 seasons | 1,733–1,232 | .584 |
Records updated through end of 2022–23 season Source
