= 1983 Big Eight Conference men's basketball tournament =

- Classification: Division I
- Season: 1982–83
- Teams: 8
- First round site: Campus Sites; Campus Arenas
- Finals site: Kemper Arena; Kansas City, MO
- Champions: Oklahoma State (1st title)
- Winning coach: Paul Hansen (1st title)
- MVP: Leroy Combs (Oklahoma State)

1982–83 Big Eight Conference men's basketball standings
	Conf.				Overall
Team	W		L	PCT	W		L	PCT
No. 10 Missouri	12	–	2	.857	26	–	8	.765
Oklahoma	10	–	4	.714	24	–	9	.727
No. 19 Oklahoma State †	9	–	5	.643	24	–	7	.774
Nebraska	9	–	5	.643	22	–	10	.688
Iowa State	5	–	9	.357	13	–	15	.464
Kansas State	4	–	10	.286	12	–	16	.429
Kansas	4	–	10	.286	13	–	16	.448
Colorado	3	–	11	.214	13	–	15	.464
† 1983 Big Eight tournament winner Rankings from AP Poll

The 1983 Big Eight Conference men's basketball tournament was held March 8–12 at a combination of on-campus gymnasiums and Kemper Arena in Kansas City, Missouri.

Number 3 seed Oklahoma State defeated top-seeded Missouri in the championship game, 93–92 in double overtime, to win their first Big Eight men's basketball tournament.

The Cowboys received an automatic bid to the 1983 NCAA tournament. They were joined in the tournament by fellow Big Eight members Missouri and Oklahoma, who earned at-large bids.

== Format ==
All eight of the conference's members participated in the tournament field. They were seeded based on regular season conference records, with all teams placed and paired in the initial quarterfinal round.

All first-round games were played on the home court of the higher-seeded team. The semifinals and championship game were played at Kemper Arena in Kansas City, Missouri.

== Bracket ==
Quarterfinals; Tuesday, March 8
1	#12 Missouri	88
8	Colorado	73
5	Iowa State	71
4	Nebraska	94
3	Oklahoma State	75
6	Kansas State	61
7	Kansas	87
2	#19 Oklahoma	77

Semifinals; Friday, March 11
1	#12 Missouri	69
4	Nebraska	63
3	Oklahoma State	90
7	Kansas	83

Championship; Saturday, March 12
1	#12 Missouri	92
3	Oklahoma State	93**
