= 1982–83 Kansas Jayhawks men's basketball team =

American college basketball season

1982–83 Kansas Jayhawks men's basketball
- Conference: Big Eight Conference
- Record: 13–16 (4–10 Big 8)
- Head coach: Ted Owens (19th season)
- Assistant coaches: John Calipari (1st season); Bob Hill (4th season); Jo Jo White (1st season)
- Captains: Jeff Dishman; Mark Summers
- Home arena: Allen Fieldhouse

1982–83 Big Eight Conference men's basketball standings
	Conf.				Overall
Team	W		L	PCT	W		L	PCT
No. 10 Missouri	12	–	2	.857	26	–	8	.765
Oklahoma	10	–	4	.714	24	–	9	.727
No. 19 Oklahoma State †	9	–	5	.643	24	–	7	.774
Nebraska	9	–	5	.643	22	–	10	.688
Iowa State	5	–	9	.357	13	–	15	.464
Kansas State	4	–	10	.286	12	–	16	.429
Kansas	4	–	10	.286	13	–	16	.448
Colorado	3	–	11	.214	13	–	15	.464
† 1983 Big Eight tournament winner Rankings from AP Poll

The 1982–83 Kansas Jayhawks men's basketball team represented the University of Kansas during the 1982–83 NCAA Division I men's basketball season. They were coached by Ted Owens in his 19th and final season as head coach. The Jayhawks finished the season 13–16 and failed to qualify for the NCAA Tournament. The season remains, as of the 2024–25 season, the last season the Jayhawks had a losing season. It's also the last time that they failed to qualify for the NCAA Tournament for reasons other than disciplinary actions from the NCAA.

== Roster ==
1982–83 Kansas Jayhawks men's basketball team
Players
Coaches

Pos.	#	Name	Height	Weight	Year	Hometown
G	10	Tim Banks (redshirt)	6 ft 2 in (1.88 m)	180 lb (82 kg)	Jr
G/F	13	Carl Henry	6 ft 5 in (1.96 m)	200 lb (91 kg)	Jr	Oklahoma City, OK
G	14	Jeff Guiot	6 ft 2 in (1.88 m)	175 lb (79 kg)	Fr	Chanute, KS
G	15	Kerry Boagni	6 ft 8 in (2.03 m)	205 lb (93 kg)	Fr	Gardena, CA
F	20	Jeff Dishman	6 ft 6 in (1.98 m)	219 lb (99 kg)	Sr	Medicine Lodge, KS
C	22	Mark Ewing	6 ft 9 in (2.06 m)	195 lb (88 kg)	Sr	McPherson, KS
F	23	Mark Summers	6 ft 7 in (2.01 m)	212 lb (96 kg)	Sr	Dimmitt, TX
F/C	24	Kelly Knight	6 ft 8 in (2.03 m)	242 lb (110 kg)	RS Jr	Salina, KS
G/F	25	Lance Hill	6 ft 5 in (1.96 m)	204 lb (93 kg)	Sr	Baltimore, MD
C	30	Greg Dreiling (redshirt)	7 ft 1 in (2.16 m)	250 lb (113 kg)	Fr	Wichita, KS
G	33	Tad Boyle	6 ft 4 in (1.93 m)	180 lb (82 kg)	So	Greeley, CO
G	35	Calvin Thompson	6 ft 6 in (1.98 m)	205 lb (93 kg)	Fr	Kansas City, KS
G/F	44	Ron Kellogg	6 ft 5 in (1.96 m)	190 lb (86 kg)	Fr	Omaha, NE
F/C	45	Brian Martin	6 ft 9 in (2.06 m)	192 lb (87 kg)	Jr	Lawrence, KS

Head coach

- Ted Owens (Oklahoma)

Assistant coach(es)

- John Calipari (Clarion)
- Bob Hill (Bowling Green)
- Jo Jo White (Kansas)

Legend

- (C) Team captain
- (S) Suspended
- (I) Ineligible
- (W) Walk-on
- Injured
- Current redshirt

== Schedule ==
Date time, TV	Rank^{#}	Opponent^{#}	Result	Record	Site city, state
November 27*		U.S. International	W 91-74	1-0	Allen Fieldhouse; Lawrence, KS
November 29*		at Bowling Green State	W 97-68	2-0	Allen Fieldhouse; Lawrence, KS
December 2*		Mississippi Valley State	W 63-51	3-0	Allen Fieldhouse; Lawrence, KS
December 4*		Saint Louis	W 83-69	4-0	Allen Fieldhouse; Lawrence, KS
December 6*		at Michigan	L 74-86	4-1	Crisler Arena; Ann Arbor, MI
December 11*		at SMU	W 62-60	5-1	Moody Coliseum; University Park, TX
December 18*		No. 3 Memphis State	L 58-64	5-2	Allen Fieldhouse; Lawrence, KS
December 20*		Alcorn State	W 86-62	6-2	Allen Fieldhouse; Lawrence, KS
December 29*		vs. No. 3 Kentucky	L 62-83	6-3	Freedom Hall; Louisville, KY
January 2*		vs. Ohio State	L 61-64	6-4	Kemper Arena; Kansas City, MO
January 6*		at Oral Roberts	L 71-73	6-5	Mabee Center; Tulsa, OK
January 8*		at Evansville	W 59-54	7-5	Roberts Stadium; Evansville, IN
January 16		Maine	W 79-68	8-5	Allen Fieldhouse; Lawrence, KS
January 20		at Oklahoma	L 92-95	8-6 (0-1)	Lloyd Noble Center; Norman, OK
January 22		at No. 18 Oklahoma State	L 74-85	8-7 (0-2)	Gallagher-Iba Arena; Stillwater, OK
January 26		No. 13 Missouri; Border War	L 63-76	8-8 (0-3)	Allen Fieldhouse; Lawrence, KS
January 29		at Kansas State; Sunflower Showdown	L 57-58	8-9 (0-4)	Ahearn Field House; Manhattan, KS
February 2		Iowa State	W 75-69	9-9 (1-4)	Allen Fieldhouse; Lawrence, KS
February 5		at Nebraska	L 61-68	9-10 (1-5)	Bob Devaney Sports Center; Lincoln, NE
February 10		Colorado	L 74-75	9-11 (1-6)	Allen Fieldhouse; Lawrence, KS
February 12		Oklahoma State	L 69-75	9-12 (1-7)	Allen Fieldhouse; Lawrence, KS
February 17		at No. 12 Missouri; Border War	L 69-74	9-13 (1-8)	Hearnes Center; Columbia, MO
February 19		No. 19 Oklahoma	W 55-53	10-13 (2-8)	Allen Fieldhouse; Lawrence, KS
February 23		at Iowa State	W 74-60	11-13 (3-8)	Hilton Coliseum; Ames, IA
February 26		Kansas State; Sunflower Showdown	L 63-70	11-14 (3-9)	Allen Fieldhouse; Lawrence, KS
March 2		Nebraska	L 58-60	11-15 (3-10)	Allen Fieldhouse; Lawrence, KS
March 5		at Colorado	W 74-63	12-15 (4-10)	CU Events/Conference Center; Boulder, CO
March 10		at No. 19 Oklahoma; Big Eight Tournament quarterfinals	W 87-77	13-15	Lloyd Noble Center; Norman, OK
March 11		vs. Oklahoma State; Big Eight Tournament Semifinals	L 83-90	13-16	Kemper Arena; Kansas City, MO
*Non-conference game. ^{#}Rankings from AP Poll. (#) Tournament seedings in parentheses.
