= Ivan McFarlin =

American basketball player

Personal information
- Born: April 26, 1982 (age 43) Missouri City, Texas, U.S.
- Listed height: 6 ft 8 in (2.03 m)
- Listed weight: 231 lb (105 kg)

Career information
- High school: Willowridge (Houston, Texas)
- College: Oklahoma State (2001–2005)
- NBA draft: 2005: undrafted
- Playing career: 2005–2013
- Position: Power forward
- Number: 31

Career history
- 2005–2006: JSF Nanterre
- 2006: Philadelphia 76ers
- 2007: Beşiktaş
- 2007–2008: TED Ankara Kolejliler
- 2008–2009: BBC Nyon
- 2009: SKK Kotwica Kołobrzeg
- 2010: Hapoel Lev HaSharon
- 2010–2011: Bendigo Braves
- 2011–2012: Link Tochigi Brex
- 2012–2013: Amistad de Chuquisaca
- 2013: Bendigo Braves
- Stats at NBA.com
- Stats at Basketball Reference

Ivan McFarlin (born April 26, 1982) is an American former professional basketball player.

== Basketball career ==
McFarlin attended Willowridge High School in Houston, Texas, where he led his team to win the state championship in his senior year, as he averaged 15.9 points, 14.9 rebounds, 3.5 blocks and 3.2 steals. McFarlin played college basketball at Oklahoma State University, and helped the Cowboys to a Final Four appearance in 2004, where the team lost to Georgia Tech on a late-game basket. He is one of four Oklahoma State players to have over 1,000 points, 700 rebounds, and 100 blocks, the other three being Byron Houston, Leroy Combs and Bryant Reeves.

In the 2006-07 NBA season, McFarlin was a member of the Philadelphia 76ers, but was traded on December 19, 2006, along with NBA superstar Allen Iverson for two draft picks, Andre Miller and Joe Smith. He was immediately waived.

McFarlin later played in Poland with SKK Kotwica Kolobrzeg. In 2010, he played for the Bendigo Braves of the South East Australian Basketball League. He made the league's all star team and led the league in rebounds and rebounds per game.

Prior to the 2010/2011 season, he signed with Hapoel Lev HaSharon of the Israeli Liga Leumit.

In 2011 Ivan returned to the Bendigo Braves.

After spending 2012 playing in China, the Bendigo Braves announced that Ivan would be returning to play a third season with the Braves in 2013.

== Personal life ==
McFarlin is the son of Delphine and Tyrone Powell McFarlin, of Missouri City, Texas. He currently lives in Stillwater, Oklahoma, the town of his college alma mater, Oklahoma State University, and assists the Oklahoma State basketball program. McFarlin also works part-time elsewhere. On May 22, 2019, McFarlin was named the head coach of the Ponca City Boys High School basketball team in Oklahoma. In 2023 McFarlin was named the head coach of the Agra High school and Middle School basketball team.
