= 2000–01 Iowa State Cyclones men's basketball team =

American college basketball season

2000–01 Iowa State Cyclones men's basketball
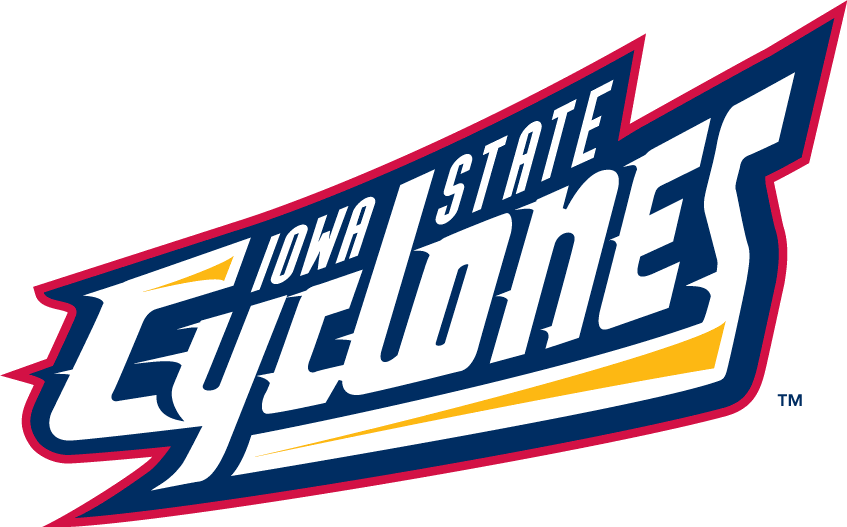

Big 12 regular season champions Yahoo! Sports Invitational champions

NCAA tournament, first round
- Conference: Big 12 Conference

Ranking
- Coaches: No. 15
- AP: No. 10
- Record: 25–6 (13–3 Big 12)
- Head coach: Larry Eustachy (3rd season)
- Assistant coaches: Terry Carroll; Leonard Perry; Randy Brown
- Home arena: Hilton Coliseum

2000–01 Big 12 men's basketball standings
	Conf.				Overall
Team	W		L	PCT	W		L	PCT
No. 10 Iowa State	13	–	3	.813	25	–	6	.806
No. 12 Kansas	12	–	4	.750	26	–	7	.788
No. 13 Oklahoma †	12	–	4	.750	26	–	7	.788
No. 18 Texas	12	–	4	.750	25	–	9	.735
Oklahoma State	10	–	6	.625	20	–	10	.667
Missouri	9	–	7	.563	20	–	13	.606
Nebraska	7	–	9	.438	14	–	16	.467
Baylor	6	–	10	.375	19	–	12	.613
Colorado	5	–	11	.313	15	–	15	.500
Kansas State	4	–	12	.250	11	–	18	.379
Texas A&M	3	–	13	.188	10	–	20	.333
Texas Tech	3	–	13	.188	9	–	19	.321
† 2001 Big 12 Tournament winner Rankings from AP poll

The 2000–01 Iowa State Cyclones men's basketball team represented Iowa State University during the 2000–01 NCAA Division I men's basketball season. The Cyclones were coached by Larry Eustachy, who was in his third season. They played their home games at Hilton Coliseum in Ames, Iowa and competed in the Big 12 Conference.

They finished the season 25–6, 13–3 in Big 12 play to finish in first place. They lost to Baylor in the quarterfinals of the Big 12 Conference tournament. They received an at-large bid as a No. 2 seed to the NCAA tournament, where they were upset by 15th-seeded Hampton.

== Previous season ==
The Cyclones finished the season 32–5, 14–2 in Big 12 play to finish in first place. They defeated Baylor, Oklahoma State, and Oklahoma to become champions of the Big 12 Conference tournament and earn an automatic bid to the NCAA tournament. This was their first regular season and conference tournament since joining the Big 12. In the NCAA Tournament, they defeated Central Connecticut State, Auburn, and UCLA to advance to the Elite Eight, where they lost to Michigan State.

The Cyclones saw individual success with Marcus Fizer being named a consensus First Team All-American and Big 12 Player of the Year, and Larry Eustachy being named AP Coach of the Year.

== Incoming players ==
Incoming players
Name	Position	Height	Weight	Previous school	Hometown
Omar Bynum	Forward	6'7	210 lbs.	Indian Hills CC	Omaha, Nebraska
Shane Power	Forward	6'5"	210 lbs.	Merrillville Andrean	Crown Point, Indiana
Tyray Pearson	Forward	6'7"	225 lbs.	Kankakee CC	Hammond, Indiana
Jake Sullivan	Guard	6'1"	195 lbs.	Tartan High	Oakdale, Minnesota
Zach Fortune	Guard	6'3"	185 lbs.	Bellevue West	Bellevue, Nebraska
Marcus Jefferson	Forward	6'5"	205 lbs.	Notre Dame Prep	East Chicago
Anderw Skoglund	Center	7'1"	250 lbs.	Hopkins High	Minnetonka, Minnesota

== Roster ==
2000–01 Iowa State Cyclones men's basketball team
Players
Coaches

Pos.	#	Name	Height	Weight	Year	Previous school	Hometown
G/F	00	Richard Evans	6 ft 5 in (1.96 m)	190 lb (86 kg)	Sr	Kimball	Dallas, Texas
G	3	Brandon Nicol	6 ft 3 in (1.91 m)	170 lb (77 kg)	So	Graettinger High	Graettinger, Iowa
G	4	Kantrail Horton (C)	6 ft 1 in (1.85 m)	225 lb (102 kg)	Sr	Middle Georgia JC	Covington, GA
F	10	Omar Bynum	6 ft 7 in (2.01 m)	210 lb (95 kg)	So	Indian Hills CC	Omaha, Nebraska
G	11	Jamaal Tinsley (C)	6 ft 3 in (1.91 m)	195 lb (88 kg)	Sr	Mt. San Jacinto CC	Brooklyn, New York
G	12	Brandon Hawkins	6 ft 3 in (1.91 m)	185 lb (84 kg)	So	St. Thomas More Academy	Fontana, California
F	21	Shane Power	6 ft 5 in (1.96 m)	210 lb (95 kg)	Fr	Merrillville Andrean	Crown Point, Indiana
F	23	Tyray Pearson	6 ft 7 in (2.01 m)	225 lb (102 kg)	Jr	Kankakee CC	Hammond, Indiana
G	24	Jake Sullivan	6 ft 1 in (1.85 m)	195 lb (88 kg)	Fr	Tartan High	Oakdale, Minnesota
G	30	Zach Fortune	6 ft 3 in (1.91 m)	185 lb (84 kg)	Fr	Bellevue West	Bellevue, Nebraska
F	33	Clint Varley	6 ft 4 in (1.93 m)	225 lb (102 kg)	So	Greenfield High	Menlo, Iowa
G/F	34	Marcus Jefferson	6 ft 5 in (1.96 m)	205 lb (93 kg)	RS Fr	Notre Dame Prep	East Chicago
G	40	Brad Davis	6 ft 2 in (1.88 m)	215 lb (98 kg)	Jr	Knoxville High	Knoxville, Iowa
G	42	Justin Fries	6 ft 2 in (1.88 m)	200 lb (91 kg)	So	Washington High	Sioux Falls, South Dakota
F	45	Paul Shirley (C)	6 ft 10 in (2.08 m)	230 lb (104 kg)	RS Sr	Jefferson West	Meriden, Kansas
F	51	Martin Rancik	6 ft 8 in (2.03 m)	230 lb (104 kg)	Sr	Saint Louis Parl	Nitra, SK
C	54	Andrew Skoglund	7 ft 1 in (2.16 m)	250 lb (113 kg)	Fr	Hopkins High	Minnetonka, Minnesota

Head coach

- Larry Eustachy (Long Beach State)

Assistant coach(es)

- Terry Carroll (Drake)
- Leonard Perry (Idaho)
- Randy Brown (Arizona)

Legend

- (C) Team captain
- (S) Suspended
- (I) Ineligible
- (W) Walk-on
- Injured
- Current redshirt

== Schedule and results ==
Date time, TV	Rank^{#}	Opponent^{#}	Result	Record	Site city, state
Exhibition
November 8, 2000; 7:00 pm		Next Level Sports	W 85–72		Hilton Coliseum (12,776); Ames, Iowa
November 15, 2000; 7:00 pm		Global Sports	W 91–85		Hilton Coliseum; Ames, Iowa
Regular season
November 21, 2000*; 8:00 pm, Cyclone Television Network		Morningside	W 102–97 ^{OT}	1–0	Hilton Coliseum; Ames, Iowa
November 24, 2000*; 7:00 pm, Cyclone Television Network		Texas Southern	W 109–70	2–0	Hilton Coliseum; Ames, Iowa
November 27, 2000*; 7:05 pm, KFXA/KFXB/KDSM		at Northern Iowa; Iowa Big Four	W 69–55	3–0	UNI-Dome; Cedar Falls, Iowa
December 1, 2000*; 8:00 pm, Cyclone Television Network		Southern; Tribune Cyclone Challenge	W 94–62	4–0	Hilton Coliseum; Ames, Iowa
December 2, 2000*; 8:00 pm, Cyclone Television Network		Southern Miss; Tribune Cyclone Challenge	W 69–67	5–0	Hilton Coliseum; Ames, Iowa
December 5, 2000*; 8:00 pm, Cyclone Television Network	No. 25	Tennessee Tech	W 89–74	6–0	Hilton Coliseum; Ames, Iowa
December 9, 2000*; 7:05 pm, ITN	No. 25	at Iowa; Rivalry	L 68–80	6–1	Carver–Hawkeye Arena; Iowa City, Iowa
December 17, 2000*; 12:00 pm, Cyclone Television Network		Drake; Iowa Big Four	W 75–55	7–1	Hilton Coliseum; Ames, Iowa
December 21, 2000*; 5:00 pm, Yahoo! Streaming		vs. Troy; Yahoo! Sports Invitational quarterfinal	W 66–56	8–1	Cannon Activities Center; Laie, HI
December 22, 2000*; 10:00 pm, Yahoo! Streaming		vs. BYU; Yahoo! Sports Invitational semifinal	W 77–71	9–1	Cannon Activities Center; Laie, HI
December 23, 2000*; 9:00 pm, Yahoo! Streaming		vs. No. 24 Ole Miss; Yahoo! Sports Invitational championship	W 73–68	10–1	Cannon Activities Center; Laie, HI
December 30, 2000*; 7:00 pm, Cyclone Television Network	No. 25	Western Carolina	W 91–53	11–1	Hilton Coliseum; Ames, Iowa
January 2, 2001*; 8:00 pm, Cyclone Television Network	No. 23	Illinois-Chicago	W 95–44	12–1	Hilton Coliseum; Ames, Iowa
January 6, 2001; 12:45 pm, ESPN Plus	No. 23	No. 15 Oklahoma	W 100–80	13–1 (1–0)	Hilton Coliseum; Ames, Iowa
January 8, 2001; 8:00 pm, ESPN	No. 18	at Oklahoma State	L 80–88 ^{OT}	13–2 (1–1)	Gallagher-Iba Arena; Stillwater, Oklahoma
January 13, 2001; 3:00 pm, ESPN Plus	No. 18	at Missouri	L 109–112 ^{4OT}	13–3 (1–2)	Hearnes Center; Columbia, Missouri
January 16, 2001; 7:00 pm, Cyclone Television Network	No. 23	Colorado	W 84–68	14–3 (2–2)	Hilton Coliseum; Ames, Iowa
January 20, 2001; 12:45 pm, ESPN Plus	No. 23	at Nebraska	W 60–59	15–3 (3–2)	Bob Devaney Center; Lincoln, Nebraska
January 25, 2001; 7:05 pm, Cyclone Television Network	No. 17	Baylor	W 72–51	16–3 (4–2)	Hilton Coliseum; Ames, Iowa
January 28, 2001; 12:00 pm, ESPN Plus	No. 17	at Texas A&M	W 72–53	17–3 (5–2)	Reed Arena; College Station, Texas
January 31, 2001; 8:00 pm, Cyclone Television Network	No. 15	at Colorado	W 71–61	18–3 (6–2)	Coors Events Center; Boulder, Colorado
February 3, 2001; 12:45 pm, ESPN Plus	No. 15	Kansas State	W 84–78	19–3 (7–2)	Hilton Coliseum; Ames, Iowa
February 5, 2001; 8:00 pm, ESPN	No. 12	at No. 3 Kansas	W 79–77	20–3 (8–2)	Allen Fieldhouse; Lawrence, Kansas
February 11, 2001; 3:00 pm, ABC	No. 12	Missouri	W 72–64	21–3 (9–2)	Hilton Coliseum; Ames, Iowa
February 17, 2001; 12:00 pm, CBS	No. 7	No. 6 Kansas	W 79–71	22–3 (10–2)	Hilton Coliseum; Ames, Iowa
February 21, 2001; 7:00 pm, Cyclone Television Network	No. 6	at Kansas State	W 62–51	23–3 (11–2)	Bramlage Coliseum; Manhattan, Kansas
February 24, 2001; 8:00 pm, ESPN	No. 6	at Texas	L 78–94	23–4 (11–3)	Frank Erwin Center; Austin, Texas
February 28, 2001; 6:30 pm, Cyclone Television Network	No. 8	Texas Tech	W 80–63	24–4 (12–3)	Hilton Coliseum; Ames, Iowa
March 3, 2001; 3:00 pm, ESPN Plus	No. 8	Nebraska	W 86–73	25–4 (13–3)	Hilton Coliseum; Ames, Iowa
Big 12 Tournament
March 9, 2001; 12:00 pm, ESPN Plus	(1) No. 7	vs. (8) Baylor; Quarterfinals	L 49–62	25–5	Kemper Arena; Kansas City, Missouri
NCAA Tournament
March 15, 2001; 9:07 pm, CBS	(2 W) No. 10	vs. (15 W) Hampton; First round	L 57–58	25–6	BSU Pavilion; Boise, Idaho
*Non-conference game. ^{#}Rankings from AP poll. (#) Tournament seedings in parentheses. All times are in Central Time.

== Rankings ==
Ranking movements Legend: ██ Increase in ranking ██ Decrease in ranking RV = Received votes
	Week																			
Poll	Pre	1	2	3	4	5	6	7	8	9	10	11	12	13	14	15	16	17	18	Final
AP	25	RV	RV	RV	25	RV	RV	25	23	18	23	17	15	12	7	6	8	7	10	Not released
Coaches	23	23^	RV	RV	RV	RV	RV	RV	RV	23	23	18	18	14	9	6	8	8	9	15

*AP does not release post-NCAA Tournament rankings.
^Coaches did not release a week 2 poll.

== Awards and honors ==
- All-American

Jamaal Tinsley (Consensus Second Team)

- Big 12 Player of the Year

Jamaal Tinsley

- Big 12 Freshman of the Year

Jake Sullivan

- Big 12 Coach of the Year

Larry Eustachy

- All-Conference Selections

Jamaal Tinsley (1st Team)
Kantrail Horton (2nd Team)
Martin Rancik (3rd Team)
Paul Shirley (Honorable Mention)

- Academic All American

Paul Shirley (Second Team)

- Academic All-Big 12 First Team

Paul Shirley

- Big 12 Player of the Week

Kantrail Horton (January 8)
Jamaal Tinsley (January 22)

- Big 12 Rookie of the Week

Jake Sullivan

- Ralph A. Olsen Award

Jamaal Tinsley
