= 2000–01 Missouri Tigers men's basketball team =

American college basketball season

2000–01 Missouri Tigers men's basketball

NCAA tournament, second round
- Conference: Big 12 Conference
- Record: 20–13 (9–7 Big 12)
- Head coach: Quin Snyder (2nd season)
- Assistant coaches: Tony Harvey (2nd season); Lane Odom (1st season); Marcus Perez (1st season)
- Home arena: Hearnes Center

2000–01 Big 12 men's basketball standings
	Conf.				Overall
Team	W		L	PCT	W		L	PCT
No. 10 Iowa State	13	–	3	.813	25	–	6	.806
No. 12 Kansas	12	–	4	.750	26	–	7	.788
No. 13 Oklahoma †	12	–	4	.750	26	–	7	.788
No. 18 Texas	12	–	4	.750	25	–	9	.735
Oklahoma State	10	–	6	.625	20	–	10	.667
Missouri	9	–	7	.563	20	–	13	.606
Nebraska	7	–	9	.438	14	–	16	.467
Baylor	6	–	10	.375	19	–	12	.613
Colorado	5	–	11	.313	15	–	15	.500
Kansas State	4	–	12	.250	11	–	18	.379
Texas A&M	3	–	13	.188	10	–	20	.333
Texas Tech	3	–	13	.188	9	–	19	.321
† 2001 Big 12 Tournament winner Rankings from AP poll

The 2000–01 Missouri Tigers men's basketball team represented the University of Missouri as a member of the Big 12 Conference during the 2000–01 NCAA men's basketball season. Led by second-year head coach Quin Snyder, the Tigers reached the second round of the NCAA tournament, and finished with an overall record of 20–13 (9–7 Big 12).

== Roster ==
2000–01 Missouri Tigers men's basketball team
Players
Coaches

Pos.	#	Name	Height	Weight	Year	Hometown
C	00	Uche Okafor	6 ft 11 in (2.11 m)	245 lb (111 kg)	So	Anambra State, Nigeria
G	2	Wesley Stokes	5 ft 10 in (1.78 m)	175 lb (79 kg)	Fr	Long Beach, California
G	4	Clarence Gilbert (C)	6 ft 2 in (1.88 m)	194 lb (88 kg)	Jr	Ft. Lauderdale, Florida
F	5	Travon Bryant	6 ft 9 in (2.06 m)	245 lb (111 kg)	Fr	Long Beach, California
G	10	Ryan Kiernan	6 ft 0 in (1.83 m)	195 lb (88 kg)	So	St. Charles, Missouri
F	12	Justin Gage	6 ft 4 in (1.93 m)	208 lb (94 kg)	So	Jefferson City, Missouri
F	15	Josh Kroenke	6 ft 4 in (1.93 m)	200 lb (91 kg)	Fr	Columbia, Missouri
F	21	Kareem Rush (C)	6 ft 6 in (1.98 m)	218 lb (99 kg)	So	Kansas City, Missouri
G	23	Rickey Paulding	6 ft 5 in (1.96 m)	210 lb (95 kg)	Fr	Detroit, Michigan
G	24	Jake Jackson	6 ft 2 in (1.88 m)	191 lb (87 kg)	So	DeSoto, Missouri
G	35	Michael Griffin	6 ft 3 in (1.91 m)	180 lb (82 kg)	Fr	Norcross, Georgia
F	50	Arthur Johnson	6 ft 9 in (2.06 m)	270 lb (122 kg)	Fr	Detroit, Michigan

Head coach

- Quin Snyder (Duke)

Assistant coach(es)

- Tony Harvey (Cameron)
- Lane Odom (High Point)
- Marcus Perez (Army)

Legend

- (C) Team captain
- (S) Suspended
- (I) Ineligible
- (W) Walk-on
- Injured
- Current redshirt

Roster

== Schedule and results ==
Date time, TV	Rank^{#}	Opponent^{#}	Result	Record	Site (attendance) city, state
Regular season
Nov 22, 2000*		vs. Rhode Island; Great Alaska Shootout	W 70–60	2–0	Sullivan Arena; Anchorage, Alaska
Nov 24, 2000*		vs. Valparaiso; Great Alaska Shootout	W 77–61	3–0	Sullivan Arena; Anchorage, Alaska
Nov 25, 2000*		vs. Syracuse; Great Alaska Shootout	L 62–84	3–1	Sullivan Arena; Anchorage, Alaska
Dec 16, 2000*; ESPN		at No. 22 Iowa	L 94–99 ^{2OT}	6–2	Carver-Hawkeye Arena; Iowa City, Iowa
Dec 18, 2000*		at Indiana	W 68–63	7–2	Assembly Hall; Bloomington, Indiana
Dec 21, 2000*		vs. No. 5 Illinois	L 81–86 ^{OT}	7–3	Scottrade Center; St. Louis, Missouri
Jan 6, 2001		Nebraska	W 68–66	10–3 (1–0)	Hearnes Center; Columbia, Missouri
Big 12 Conference tournament
Mar 8, 2001*		vs. Texas A&M; First Round	W 77–62	19–11	Kemper Arena; Kansas City, Missouri
Mar 9, 2001*		vs. No. 16 Oklahoma; Quarterfinals	L 65–67	19–12	Kemper Arena; Kansas City, Missouri
NCAA tournament
Mar 15, 2001*	(9 E)	vs. (8 E) Georgia; First Round	W 70–68	20–12	Greensboro Coliseum; Greensboro, North Carolina
Mar 17, 2001*	(9 E)	vs. (1 E) No. 1 Duke; Second Round	L 81–94	20–13	Greensboro Coliseum; Greensboro, North Carolina
*Non-conference game. ^{#}Rankings from AP poll. (#) Tournament seedings in parentheses. E=East. All times are in Central.
