= 2000–01 Oklahoma State Cowboys basketball team =

American college basketball season

2000–01 Oklahoma State Cowboys basketball

NCAA tournament, first round
- Conference: Big 12 Conference
- Record: 20–10 (10–6 Big 12)
- Head coach: Eddie Sutton (11th season)
- Assistant coaches: Sean Sutton; Kyle Keller (2nd season)
- Home arena: Gallagher-Iba Arena (Capacity: 6,381)

2000–01 Big 12 men's basketball standings
	Conf.				Overall
Team	W		L	PCT	W		L	PCT
No. 10 Iowa State	13	–	3	.813	25	–	6	.806
No. 12 Kansas	12	–	4	.750	26	–	7	.788
No. 13 Oklahoma †	12	–	4	.750	26	–	7	.788
No. 18 Texas	12	–	4	.750	25	–	9	.735
Oklahoma State	10	–	6	.625	20	–	10	.667
Missouri	9	–	7	.563	20	–	13	.606
Nebraska	7	–	9	.438	14	–	16	.467
Baylor	6	–	10	.375	19	–	12	.613
Colorado	5	–	11	.313	15	–	15	.500
Kansas State	4	–	12	.250	11	–	18	.379
Texas A&M	3	–	13	.188	10	–	20	.333
Texas Tech	3	–	13	.188	9	–	19	.321
† 2001 Big 12 Tournament winner Rankings from AP poll

The 2000–01 Oklahoma State Cowboys basketball team represented Oklahoma State University as a member of the Big 12 Conference during the 2000–01 NCAA Division I men's basketball season. They were led by 11th-year head coach Eddie Sutton and played their home games at Gallagher-Iba Arena in Stillwater, Oklahoma. They finished the season 20–10, 10–6 in Big 12 play to finish in fifth place. The Cowboys lost to Missouri in the quarterfinals of the Big 12 tournament. The team received an at-large bid to the NCAA tournament as the No. 11 seed in the East region. Oklahoma State lost to No. 6 seed USC in the opening round.

== Plane crash ==
On January 27, 2001 at 5:37 pm, following a road loss to the Colorado Buffaloes, a Beechcraft Super King Air 200 transporting two players and six Oklahoma State broadcasters and members of the team coaching staff, crashed into a field near Strasburg, Colorado. The crash killed all 8 passengers and both pilots onboard.

The plane was on-route from Jefferson County Airport to Stillwater Regional Airport. 20 minutes after takeoff, the pilot became disoriented by his equipment and instruments failing in the midst of a snow storm, resulting in the fatal crash.

Following the disaster, Oklahoma State erected a memorial inside Gallagher-Iba Arena, entitled "Remember the Ten", to commemorate the passing of all those involved in the crash. Additionally, a memorial was established in Strasburg, Colorado to honor and remember the tragedy.

== Roster ==
2000–01 Oklahoma State Cowboys men's basketball team
Players
Coaches

Pos.	#	Name	Height	Weight	Year	Previous school	Hometown
G	1	Maurice Baker	6 ft 1 in (1.85 m)	180 lb (82 kg)	Jr	Madison, Illinois
G	5	Victor Williams	5 ft 10 in (1.78 m)	—	So
G	34	Melvin Sanders	6 ft 5 in (1.96 m)	210 lb (95 kg)	Fr	Liberal, Kansas

Head coach

- Eddie Sutton

Assistant coach(es)

- Sean Sutton
- Kyle Keller

Legend

- (C) Team captain
- (S) Suspended
- (I) Ineligible
- (W) Walk-on
- Injured
- Current redshirt

== Schedule and results ==
Date time, TV	Rank^{#}	Opponent^{#}	Result	Record	Site city, state
Regular season
Nov 21, 2000*		vs. UMKC	W 69–46	1–0	Mabee Center; Tulsa, Oklahoma
Nov 28, 2000*		at North Texas	W 94–56	2–0	Super Pit; Denton, Texas
Dec 2, 2000*		UNLV	W 77–69 ^{OT}	3–0	Gallagher-Iba Arena; Stillwater, Oklahoma
Dec 6, 2000*		at Wichita State	L 59–61	3–1	Levitt Arena; Wichita, Kansas
Dec 9, 2000*		No. 21 Arkansas	W 74–73	4–1	Gallagher-Iba Arena; Stillwater, Oklahoma
Dec 16, 2000*		Northwestern State	W 73–59	5–1	Gallagher-Iba Arena; Stillwater, Oklahoma
Dec 19, 2000*		Arkansas–Little Rock	W 70–60	6–1	Gallagher-Iba Arena; Stillwater, Oklahoma
Dec 22, 2000*		Lamar	W 86–45	7–1	Gallagher-Iba Arena; Stillwater, Oklahoma
Dec 30, 2000*		at San Diego State	L 66–87	7–2	Cox Arena; San Diego, California
Jan 3, 2001*		UTSA	W 88–63	8–2	Gallagher-Iba Arena; Stillwater, Oklahoma
Jan 6, 2001		at No. 24 Texas	L 71–78	8–3 (0–1)	Frank Erwin Center; Austin, Texas
Jan 8, 2001; ESPN		No. 18 Iowa State	W 88–80 ^{OT}	9–3 (1–1)	Gallagher-Iba Arena; Stillwater, Oklahoma
Jan 13, 2001		Texas Tech	W 65–46	10–3 (2–1)	Gallagher-Iba Arena; Stillwater, Oklahoma
Jan 17, 2001		at Baylor	W 76–65	11–3 (3–1)	Ferrell Center; Waco, Texas
Jan 20, 2001*		St. Gregory's	W 74–58	12–3	Gallagher-Iba Arena; Stillwater, Oklahoma
Jan 24, 2001		Texas A&M	W 76–64	13–3 (4–1)	Gallagher-Iba Arena; Stillwater, Oklahoma
Jan 27, 2001		at Colorado	L 71–81	13–4 (4–2)	Coors Events Center; Boulder, Colorado
Feb 5, 2001		Missouri	W 69–66	14–4 (5–2)	Gallagher-Iba Arena; Stillwater, Oklahoma
Feb 7, 2001		at Nebraska	L 75–78 ^{OT}	14–5 (5–3)	Bob Devaney Sports Center; Lincoln, Nebraska
Feb 10, 2001		at No. 5 Kansas	L 61–77	14–6 (5–4)	Allen Fieldhouse; Lawrence, Kansas
Feb 14, 2001		No. 13 Oklahoma	W 72–44	15–6 (6–4)	Gallagher-Iba Arena; Stillwater, Oklahoma
Feb 17, 2001		Texas	L 69–80 ^{OT}	15–7 (6–5)	Gallagher-Iba Arena; Stillwater, Oklahoma
Feb 21, 2001		Texas A&M	W 82–76	16–7 (7–5)	Reed Arena; College Station, Texas
Feb 24, 2001		Kansas State	W 52–47	17–7 (8–5)	Gallagher-Iba Arena; Stillwater, Oklahoma
Feb 26, 2001		at Texas Tech	W 66–58	18–7 (9–5)	United Spirit Arena; Lubbock, Texas
Feb 28, 2001		Baylor	W 71–68	19–7 (10–5)	Gallagher-Iba Arena; Stillwater, Oklahoma
Mar 3, 2001		at No. 17 Oklahoma	L 56–68	19–8 (10–6)	Lloyd Noble Center; Norman, Oklahoma
Big 12 Tournament
Mar 8, 2001*		vs. Texas Tech; First round	W 71–59	20–8	Kemper Arena; Kansas City, Missouri
Mar 9, 2001*		vs. No. 20 Texas; Quarterfinals	L 54–55	20–9	Kemper Arena; Kansas City, Missouri
NCAA Tournament
Mar 15, 2001*; CBS	(11 E)	vs. (6 E) USC; First round	L 54–69	20–10	Nassau Coliseum (13,817); Uniondale, New York
*Non-conference game. ^{#}Rankings from AP poll. (#) Tournament seedings in parentheses. E=East.
