= 2000–01 Nebraska Cornhuskers men's basketball team =

American college basketball season

2000–01 Nebraska Cornhuskers men's basketball

Orange Bowl Classic champion
- Conference: Big 12 Conference
- Record: 14–16 (7–9 Big 12)
- Head coach: Barry Collier (1st season)
- Home arena: Bob Devaney Sports Center

2000–01 Big 12 men's basketball standings
	Conf.				Overall
Team	W		L	PCT	W		L	PCT
No. 10 Iowa State	13	–	3	.813	25	–	6	.806
No. 12 Kansas	12	–	4	.750	26	–	7	.788
No. 13 Oklahoma †	12	–	4	.750	26	–	7	.788
No. 18 Texas	12	–	4	.750	25	–	9	.735
Oklahoma State	10	–	6	.625	20	–	10	.667
Missouri	9	–	7	.563	20	–	13	.606
Nebraska	7	–	9	.438	14	–	16	.467
Baylor	6	–	10	.375	19	–	12	.613
Colorado	5	–	11	.313	15	–	15	.500
Kansas State	4	–	12	.250	11	–	18	.379
Texas A&M	3	–	13	.188	10	–	20	.333
Texas Tech	3	–	13	.188	9	–	19	.321
† 2001 Big 12 Tournament winner Rankings from AP poll

The 2000–01 Nebraska Cornhuskers men's basketball team represented the University of Nebraska–Lincoln during the 2000–01 NCAA Division I men's basketball season. Led by head coach Barry Collier, the Cornhuskers competed in the Big 12 Conference and played their home games at the Bob Devaney Sports Center.

On December 16, 2000, Nebraska defeated Miami 72–64 in the Orange Bowl Basketball Classic. Steffon Bradford led the Cornhuskers with 21 points and 9 rebounds.

Nebraska finished the season with a 14–16 record. The Cornhuskers season ended with a 62–58 loss to Kansas State in the Big 12 tournament on March 8, 2001.
