= Big Eight Conference men's basketball tournament =

Big Eight Conference men's basketball tournament (defunct)
- Conference basketball championship
- Sport: College basketball
- Conference: Big Eight Conference
- Format: Single-elimination tournament
- Played: 1977–1996
- Most championships: Missouri (6)

Host stadiums
- Kemper Arena (1977–96)

Host locations
- Kansas City, MO (1977–96)

The Big Eight Conference was an NCAA athletic conference that existed from 1907 to 1996, when it and the Southwest Conference disbanded to create the Big 12 Conference. The post-season conference tournament was instituted in 1977 and from that time the winner won the conference's automatic NCAA tournament bid. From 1977 until 1985, the quarterfinals were played on the campus sites of the higher seeded teams. The last Big Eight men's basketball tournament ran through the conference's final season in 1996. Missouri won the most Big Eight tournament titles with six. Colorado was the only conference member not to win at least one tournament title during its existence.

== Tournament champions by year ==
Year	Champion	Score	Runner-up	Most Valuable Player	Venue (and city)	Reference
1977	Kansas State	72–67 (OT)	Missouri	Mike Evans, Kansas State	Semifinals and final at Kemper Arena (Kansas City, Missouri)	
1978	Missouri	71–68 (OT)	Kansas State	Stan Ray, Missouri	Semifinals and final at Kemper Arena (Kansas City, Missouri)	
1979	Oklahoma	80–65	Kansas	Al Beal, Oklahoma	Semifinals and final at Kemper Arena (Kansas City, Missouri)	
1980	Kansas State	79–58	Kansas	Rolando Blackman, Kansas State	Semifinals and final at Kemper Arena (Kansas City, Missouri)	
1981	Kansas	80–68	Kansas State	Darnell Valentine, Kansas	Semifinals and final at Kemper Arena (Kansas City, Missouri)	
1982	Missouri	68–63	Oklahoma	Ricky Frazier, Missouri	Semifinals and final at Kemper Arena (Kansas City, Missouri)	
1983	Oklahoma State	93–92 (2OT)	Missouri	Leroy Combs, Oklahoma State	Semifinals and final at Kemper Arena (Kansas City, Missouri)	
1984	Kansas	79–78	Oklahoma	Wayman Tisdale, Oklahoma	Semifinals and final at Kemper Arena (Kansas City, Missouri)	
1985	Oklahoma	73–71	Iowa State	Wayman Tisdale, Oklahoma	Semifinals and final at Kemper Arena (Kansas City, Missouri)	
1986	Kansas	73–71	Iowa State	Danny Manning, Kansas	Kemper Arena (Kansas City, Missouri)	
1987	Missouri	67–65	Kansas	Danny Manning, Kansas	Kemper Arena (Kansas City, Missouri)	
1988	Oklahoma	88–83	Kansas State	Stacey King, Oklahoma	Kemper Arena (Kansas City, Missouri)	
1989	Missouri	98–86	Oklahoma	Doug Smith, Missouri	Kemper Arena (Kansas City, Missouri)	
1990	Oklahoma	92–80	Colorado	Shaun Vandiver, Colorado	Kemper Arena (Kansas City, Missouri)	
1991	Missouri	90–82	Nebraska	Doug Smith, Missouri	Kemper Arena (Kansas City, Missouri)	
1992	Kansas	66–57	Oklahoma State	Byron Houston, Oklahoma State	Kemper Arena (Kansas City, Missouri)	
1993	Missouri	68–56	Kansas State	Chris Heller, Missouri	Kemper Arena (Kansas City, Missouri)	
1994	Nebraska	77–68	Oklahoma State	Eric Piatkowski, Nebraska	Kemper Arena (Kansas City, Missouri)	
1995	Oklahoma State	62–53	Iowa State	Bryant Reeves, Oklahoma State	Kemper Arena (Kansas City, Missouri)	
1996	Iowa State	56–55	Kansas	Dedric Willoughby, Iowa State	Kemper Arena (Kansas City, Missouri)	

== Championships by school ==
Titles	School
6	Missouri
4	Kansas, Oklahoma
2	Kansas State, Oklahoma State
1	Iowa State, Nebraska
0	Colorado

== Television coverage ==
Year	Network	Play-by-play	Analyst
1996	CBS	Jim Nantz	Billy Packer
1994	Raycom	Dave Armstrong	Gary Thompson and Jimmy Dykes
1992	ESPN	Ron Franklin	Clark Kellogg
1989	ABC	Al Trautwig	Cheryl Miller
1988	ABC	Al Trautwig	David Robinson
1987	ABC	Al Trautwig	Digger Phelps
1985	CBS	Gary Bender	Doug Collins
1983	CBS	Gary Bender	Billy Packer

== See also ==
- Big 12 men's basketball tournament
