= 2001 Big 12 men's basketball tournament =

- Classification: Division I
- Season: 2000–01
- Teams: 12
- Site: Kemper Arena; Kansas City, Missouri
- Champions: Oklahoma (1st title)
- Winning coach: Kelvin Sampson (1st title)
- MVP: Nolan Johnson (Oklahoma)
- Attendance: 91,500 (overall); 11,500 (championship)
- Top scorer: DeMarcus Minor (Baylor) (67 points)
- Television: ESPN

2000–01 Big 12 men's basketball standings
	Conf.				Overall
Team	W		L	PCT	W		L	PCT
No. 10 Iowa State	13	–	3	.813	25	–	6	.806
No. 12 Kansas	12	–	4	.750	26	–	7	.788
No. 13 Oklahoma †	12	–	4	.750	26	–	7	.788
No. 18 Texas	12	–	4	.750	25	–	9	.735
Oklahoma State	10	–	6	.625	20	–	10	.667
Missouri	9	–	7	.563	20	–	13	.606
Nebraska	7	–	9	.438	14	–	16	.467
Baylor	6	–	10	.375	19	–	12	.613
Colorado	5	–	11	.313	15	–	15	.500
Kansas State	4	–	12	.250	11	–	18	.379
Texas A&M	3	–	13	.188	10	–	20	.333
Texas Tech	3	–	13	.188	9	–	19	.321
† 2001 Big 12 Tournament winner Rankings from AP poll

The 2001 Big 12 men's basketball tournament was the postseason men's basketball tournament for the Big 12 Conference. It was played from March 8 to 11 in Kansas City, Missouri at Kemper Arena. Oklahoma won the tournament for the 1st time and received the conference's automatic bid to the 2001 NCAA tournament.

== Seeding ==
The Tournament consisted of a 12 team single-elimination tournament with the top 4 seeds receiving a bye.

2001 Big 12 Men's Basketball Tournament seeds
Seed	School	Conf.	Over.	Tiebreaker
1	Iowa State ‡#	13–3	25–6	
2	Kansas #	12–4	26–7	
3	Oklahoma #	12–4	26–7	
4	Texas #	12–4	25–9	
5	Oklahoma State	10–6	20–10	
6	Missouri	9–7	20–13	
7	Nebraska	7–9	14–16	
8	Baylor	6–10	19–12	
9	Colorado	5–11	15–15	
10	Kansas State	4–12	11–18	
11	Texas A&M	3–13	10–20	
12	Texas Tech	3–13	9–19	
‡ – Big 12 Conference regular season champions, and tournament No. 1 seed. # – Received a single-bye in the conference tournament. Overall records include all games played in the Big 12 Conference tournament.

== Schedule ==
Session	Game	Time	Matchup	Television	Attendance
First Round – Thursday, March 8
1	1	12:00 PM	#8 Baylor 86 vs #9 Colorado 84 ^{OT}	Big 12	19,100
1	2	2:20 PM	#5 Oklahoma St 71 vs #12 Texas Tech 59	Big 12	19,100
2	3	6:00 PM	#10 Kansas State 62 vs #7 Nebraska 58	Big 12	6,200
2	4	8:20 PM	#6 Missouri 77 vs #11 Texas A&M 62	Big 12	6,200
Quarterfinals – Friday, March 9
3	5	12:00 PM	#8 Baylor 62 vs #1 Iowa State 49	Big 12	17,600
3	6	2:20 PM	#4 Texas 55 vs #5 Oklahoma State 54	Big 12	17,600
4	7	6:00 PM	#2 Kansas 94 vs #10 Kansas State 63	Big 12	18,000
4	8	8:20 PM	#3 Oklahoma 67 vs #6 Missouri 65	Big 12	18,000
Semifinals – Saturday, March 10
5	9	1:00 PM	#4 Texas 76 vs #8 Baylor 62	Big 12	19,100
5	10	3:20 PM	#3 Oklahoma 62 vs #2 Kansas 57	Big 12	19,100
Final – Sunday, March 11
6	11	2:00 PM	#3 Oklahoma 54 vs #4 Texas 45	ESPN	11,500
Game times in CT. #-Rankings denote tournament seed

== Bracket ==
First round
8	Baylor	86*
9	Colorado	84
5	Oklahoma State	71
12	Texas Tech	59
7	Nebraska	58
10	Kansas State	62
6	Missouri	77
11	Texas A&M	62

Second round
1	No. 7 Iowa State	49
8	Baylor	62
4	No. 20 Texas	55
5	Oklahoma St	54
2	No. 9 Kansas	94
10	Kansas St	63
3	No. 16 Oklahoma	67
6	Missouri	65

Semifinals
8	Baylor	62
4	No. 20 Texas	76
2	No. 9 Kansas	57
3	No. 16 Oklahoma	62

Finals
4	No. 20 Texas	45
3	No. 16 Oklahoma	54

* Indicates overtime game

== All-Tournament Team ==
Most Outstanding Player – Nolan Johnson, Oklahoma

Player	Team	Position	Class
Nolan Johnson	Oklahoma	Sr.	G
DeMarcus Minor	Baylor	Sr.	G
Kareem Rush	Missouri	So.	F
Hollis Price	Oklahoma	So.	G
Chris Owens	Texas	Jr.	F

== See also ==
- 2001 Big 12 Conference women's basketball tournament
- 2001 NCAA Division I men's basketball tournament
- 2000–01 NCAA Division I men's basketball rankings
