= 1982–83 Iowa State Cyclones men's basketball team =

American college basketball season

1982–83 Iowa State Cyclones men's basketball
- Conference: Big Eight Conference
- Record: 13–15 (5–9 Big Eight)
- Head coach: Johnny Orr (3rd season)
- Home arena: Hilton Coliseum

1982–83 Big Eight Conference men's basketball standings
	Conf.				Overall
Team	W		L	PCT	W		L	PCT
No. 10 Missouri	12	–	2	.857	26	–	8	.765
Oklahoma	10	–	4	.714	24	–	9	.727
No. 19 Oklahoma State †	9	–	5	.643	24	–	7	.774
Nebraska	9	–	5	.643	22	–	10	.688
Iowa State	5	–	9	.357	13	–	15	.464
Kansas State	4	–	10	.286	12	–	16	.429
Kansas	4	–	10	.286	13	–	16	.448
Colorado	3	–	11	.214	13	–	15	.464
† 1983 Big Eight tournament winner Rankings from AP Poll

The 1982–83 Iowa State Cyclones men's basketball team represented Iowa State University during the 1982–83 NCAA Division I men's basketball season. The Cyclones were coached by Johnny Orr, who was in his 3rd season. They played their home games at Hilton Coliseum in Ames, Iowa.

They finished the season 13–15, 5–9 in Big Eight play to finish in fifth. The Cyclones lost in the first round of the Big Eight tournament to Nebraska, falling 94–71.

== Roster ==
1982–83 Iowa State Cyclones men's basketball team
Players
Coaches

Pos.	#	Name	Height	Weight	Year	Hometown
G		Barry Stevens	6 ft 5 in (1.96 m)	—	So
F		Ron Harris (C)	6 ft 3 in (1.91 m)	—	Jr
G		Terrence Allen	6 ft 0 in (1.83 m)	—	Jr
C		Ron Falenschek	6 ft 11 in (2.11 m)	—	Sr
G		Jeff Hornacek	6 ft 3 in (1.91 m)	—	Fr
F		Ray Harris	—	—	So
C		David Moss	6 ft 9 in (2.06 m)	—	Fr
G		Paul Beene	5 ft 11 in (1.8 m)	—
F		Ron Virgil	6 ft 4 in (1.93 m)	—	Fr
F		Tom Peterson	—	—	So
G		Ted Burbach	6 ft 4 in (1.93 m)	—	Jr
		Wes Wallace	—	—	So
		Dave Rauker	—	—

Head coach

- Johnny Orr (Beloit)

Assistant coach(es)

Legend

- (C) Team captain
- (S) Suspended
- (I) Ineligible
- (W) Walk-on
- Injured
- Current redshirt

== Schedule and results ==
Date time, TV	Rank^{#}	Opponent^{#}	Result	Record	Site city, state
Exhibition
November 19, 1982*; 7:35 pm		Windsor (Canada); Exhibition	W 98–73		Hilton Coliseum; Ames, Iowa
Regular season
November 27, 1982*; 1:35 pm		Nebraska-Omaha	W 69–63	1–0	Hilton Coliseum; Ames, Iowa
December 2, 1982*; 7:35 pm, WOI/Iowa Cable Network		Minnesota	W 80–78 ^{OT}	2–0	Hilton Coliseum (9,138); Ames, Iowa
December 4, 1982*; 12:35 pm, WOI/Iowa Cable Network		Northeast Missouri State (Truman State)	W 81–57	3–0	Hilton Coliseum; Ames, Iowa
December 8, 1982*; 7:35 pm, WOI/Iowa Cable Network		Drake; Iowa Big Four	W 52–47	4–0	Hilton Coliseum; Ames, Iowa
December 11, 1982*; 8:35 pm		at Arizona	W 80–66	5–0	McKale Center; Tucson, Arizona
December 18, 1982*; 7:35 pm		TCU	L 66–74	5–1	Hilton Coliseum; Ames, Iowa
December 21, 1982*; 7:35 pm		Wisconsin-Oshkosh	W 78–72	6–1	Hilton Coliseum; Ames, Iowa
December 28, 1982*; 8:00 pm		at Jacksonville; Gator Bowl Classic Semifinals	L 60–78	6–2	Veterans Memorial Coliseum; Jacksonville, Florida
December 29, 1982*; 6:00 pm		vs. Penn State; Gator Bowl Classic Consolation	L 60–78	6–3	Veterans Memorial Coliseum; Jacksonville, Florida
January 3, 1983*; 7:30 pm		vs. Illinois	L 57–74	6–4	Rosemont Horizon; Rosemont, Illinois
January 8, 1983*; 1:38 pm, WOI/Iowa Cable Network		Chicago State	W 60–58	7–4	Hilton Coliseum; Ames, Iowa
January 11, 1983*; 7:35 pm		Northern Iowa; Iowa Big Four	W 73–50	8–4	Hilton Coliseum; Ames, Iowa
January 15, 1983*; 1:05 pm, Iowa Television Network		at No. 12 Iowa; CyHawk Rivalry	L 56–73	8–5	Carver–Hawkeye Arena; Iowa City, Iowa
January 18, 1983; 8:10 pm, WOI/ESPN		Nebraska	L 54–59	8–6 (0–1)	Hilton Coliseum; Ames, Iowa
January 22, 1983; 2:05 pm		at Kansas State	L 55–81	8–7 (0–2)	Ahearn Fieldhouse; Manhattan, Kansas
January 26, 1983; 7:35 pm		Colorado	W 82–78	9–7 (1–2)	Hilton Coliseum; Ames, Iowa
January 29, 1983; 12:05 pm, NBC-TVS Big Eight		No. 20 Oklahoma State	W 73–64	10–7 (2–2)	Hilton Coliseum; Ames, Iowa
February 2, 1983; 7:35 pm		at Kansas	L 69–75	10–8 (2–3)	Allen Fieldhouse; Lawrence, Kansas
February 5, 1983; 8:05 pm		at Oklahoma	L 74–102	10–9 (2–4)	Lloyd Noble Center; Norman, Oklahoma
February 8, 1983; 8:05 pm, KSHB/WOI/ESPN (delay)		No. 10 Missouri	W 73–72 ^{OT}	11–9 (3–4)	Hilton Coliseum; Ames, Iowa
February 12, 1983; 1:35 pm		Kansas State	W 59–40	12–9 (4–4)	Hilton Coliseum; Ames, Iowa
February 16, 1983; 9:05 pm		at Colorado	W 69–67	13–9 (5–4)	Coors Events Center; Boulder, Colorado
February 19, 1983; 7:35 pm		at Nebraska	L 66–67	13–10 (5–5)	Devaney Sports Center; Lincoln, Nebraska
February 23, 1983; 7:35 pm		Kansas	L 60–74	13–11 (5–6)	Hilton Coliseum; Ames, Iowa
February 26, 1983; 7:35 pm		at Oklahoma State	L 70–78	13–12 (5–7)	Gallagher Hall; Stillwater, Oklahoma
March 2, 1983; 7:35 pm		Oklahoma	L 67–69 ^{OT}	13–13 (5–8)	Hilton Coliseum; Ames, Iowa
March 5, 1983; 12:10 pm, NBC-TVS Big Eight		at No. 13 Missouri	L 66–84	13–14 (5–9)	Hearnes Center; Columbia, Missouri
Big Eight tournament
March 8, 1983; 7:30 pm	(5)	at (4) Nebraska; Big Eight tournament Quarterfinals	L 71–94	13–15	Devaney Sports Center; Lincoln, Nebraska
*Non-conference game. ^{#}Rankings from AP poll. (#) Tournament seedings in parentheses. All times are in Central Time.
