= 2000–01 Oklahoma Sooners men's basketball team =

American college basketball season

2000–01 Oklahoma Sooners men's basketball

Big 12 tournament champion

NCAA tournament, second round
- Conference: Big 12 Conference

Ranking
- Coaches: No. 19
- AP: No. 13
- Record: 26–7 (12–4 Big 12)
- Head coach: Kelvin Sampson (7th season)
- Home arena: Lloyd Noble Center (Capacity: 10,871)

2000–01 Big 12 men's basketball standings
	Conf.				Overall
Team	W		L	PCT	W		L	PCT
No. 10 Iowa State	13	–	3	.813	25	–	6	.806
No. 12 Kansas	12	–	4	.750	26	–	7	.788
No. 13 Oklahoma †	12	–	4	.750	26	–	7	.788
No. 18 Texas	12	–	4	.750	25	–	9	.735
Oklahoma State	10	–	6	.625	20	–	10	.667
Missouri	9	–	7	.563	20	–	13	.606
Nebraska	7	–	9	.438	14	–	16	.467
Baylor	6	–	10	.375	19	–	12	.613
Colorado	5	–	11	.313	15	–	15	.500
Kansas State	4	–	12	.250	11	–	18	.379
Texas A&M	3	–	13	.188	10	–	20	.333
Texas Tech	3	–	13	.188	9	–	19	.321
† 2001 Big 12 Tournament winner Rankings from AP poll

The 2000–01 Oklahoma Sooners men's basketball team represented the University of Oklahoma in competitive college basketball during the 2000–01 NCAA Division I men's basketball season. The Oklahoma Sooners men's basketball team played its home games in the Lloyd Noble Center and was a member of the National Collegiate Athletic Association's Big 12 Conference.

The team posted a 26–7 overall record (12–4 Big 12). The Sooners received a bid to the 2001 NCAA tournament as No. 4 seed in the South region. The team was upset by No. 13 seed Indiana State in the opening round, 70–68 in overtime.

== Roster ==
2000–01 Oklahoma Sooners men's basketball team
Players
Coaches

Pos.	#	Name	Height	Weight	Year	Previous school	Hometown
G	10	Hollis Price	6 ft 1 in (1.85 m)	160 lb (73 kg)	So	St. Augustine	New Orleans, Louisiana
F	44	Aaron McGhee	6 ft 8 in (2.03 m)	—	Jr

Head coach

- Kelvin Sampson

Assistant coach(es)

Legend

- (C) Team captain
- (S) Suspended
- (I) Ineligible
- (W) Walk-on
- Injured
- Current redshirt

Roster

== Schedule and results ==
Date time, TV	Rank^{#}	Opponent^{#}	Result	Record	Site (attendance) city, state
Non-conference regular season
Dec 2, 2000*	No. 14	at Ole Miss	L 55–60	5–1	Tad Smith Coliseum; Oxford, Mississippi
Dec 23, 2000*	No. 18	No. 25 Arkansas	W 88–79 ^{OT}	9–1	Lloyd Noble Center; Norman, Oklahoma
Big 12 Regular Season
Jan 6, 2001		at No. 23 Iowa State	L 80–100	11–2 (0–1)	Hilton Coliseum; Ames, Iowa
Mar 3, 2001	No. 17	Oklahoma State	W 68–56	23–6 (12–4)	Lloyd Noble Center; Norman, Oklahoma
Big 12 Tournament
Mar 9, 2001*	(3) No. 16	vs. (6) Missouri; Quarterfinals	W 67–65	24–6	Kemper Arena; Kansas City, Missouri
Mar 10, 2001*	(3) No. 16	vs. (2) No. 9 Kansas; Semifinals	W 62–57	25–6	Kemper Arena; Kansas City, Missouri
Mar 11, 2001*	(3) No. 16	vs. (4) No. 20 Texas; Championship game	W 54–45	26–6	Kemper Arena; Kansas City, Missouri
NCAA Tournament
Mar 16, 2001*	(4 S) No. 13	vs. (13 S) Indiana State; First Round	L 68–70 ^{OT}	26–7	The Pyramid; Memphis, Tennessee
*Non-conference game. ^{#}Rankings from AP poll. (#) Tournament seedings in parentheses. All times are in Central Time. (#) during NCAA Tournament is seed within region S=South.
