= 2000–01 Kansas Jayhawks men's basketball team =

American college basketball season

2000–01 Kansas Jayhawks men's basketball

Coaches Vs. Cancer Classic champions

NCAA tournament, Sweet Sixteen
- Conference: Big 12 Conference
- North

Ranking
- Coaches: No. 7
- AP: No. 12
- Record: 26–7 (12–4 Big 12)
- Head coach: Roy Williams (13th season)
- Assistant coaches: Neil Dougherty (6th season); Jerod Haase (2nd season); Joe Holladay (7th season); Ben Miller (1st season)
- Captains: Eric Chenowith; Kenny Gregory
- Home arena: Allen Fieldhouse

2000–01 Big 12 men's basketball standings
	Conf.				Overall
Team	W		L	PCT	W		L	PCT
No. 10 Iowa State	13	–	3	.813	25	–	6	.806
No. 12 Kansas	12	–	4	.750	26	–	7	.788
No. 13 Oklahoma †	12	–	4	.750	26	–	7	.788
No. 18 Texas	12	–	4	.750	25	–	9	.735
Oklahoma State	10	–	6	.625	20	–	10	.667
Missouri	9	–	7	.563	20	–	13	.606
Nebraska	7	–	9	.438	14	–	16	.467
Baylor	6	–	10	.375	19	–	12	.613
Colorado	5	–	11	.313	15	–	15	.500
Kansas State	4	–	12	.250	11	–	18	.379
Texas A&M	3	–	13	.188	10	–	20	.333
Texas Tech	3	–	13	.188	9	–	19	.321
† 2001 Big 12 Tournament winner Rankings from AP poll

The 2000–01 Kansas Jayhawks men's basketball team represented the University of Kansas in the 2000–01 NCAA Division I men's basketball season, which was the Jayhawks' 103rd basketball season. The head coach was Roy Williams, who served his 13th year at KU. The team played its home games in Allen Fieldhouse in Lawrence, Kansas. The Jayhawks were eliminated in the Sweet 16 of the NCAA tournament by Illinois, who were coached by future Kansas head coach Bill Self.

== Roster ==
Name	#	Position	Height	Weight	Year	Home Town
Luke Axtell	33	Guard/forward	6–10	220	Junior	Austin, Texas
Brett Ballard	3	Guard	6–0	175	Junior	Hutchinson, Kansas
Jeff Boschee	13	Guard	6–1	185	Junior	Valley City, North Dakota
Jeff Carey	22	Center	6–11	250	Junior	Camdenton, Missouri
Eric Chenowith	44	Center	7–1	270	Senior	Orange, California
Nick Collison	4	Forward	6–9	255	Sophomore	Iowa Falls, Iowa
Drew Gooden	0	Forward	6–10	230	Sophomore	Richmond, California
Kenny Gregory	20	Guard/forward	6–5	208	Senior	Columbus, Ohio
Lewis Harrison	2	Guard	6–0	165	Junior	Kansas City, Kansas
Kirk Hinrich	10	Guard	6–3	190	Sophomore	Sioux City, Iowa
Todd Kappelmann	50	Forward	6–9	230	Junior	Augusta, Kansas
Mario Kinsey	1	Guard	6–2	183	Freshman	Waco, Texas
Bryant Nash	15	Forward	6–6	200	Freshman	Carrollton, Texas
Chris Zerbe	34	Forward	6–5	235	Junior	Andover, Kansas

== Schedule ==
Date time, TV	Rank^{#}	Opponent^{#}	Result	Record	Site (attendance) city, state
Exhibition
11/1/2000*	No. 7	California All-Stars	W 98–80		Allen Fieldhouse (15,600); Lawrence, KS
11/4/2000*	No. 7	Emporia State	W 120–51		Allen Fieldhouse (16,000); Lawrence, KS
Coaches Vs. Cancer Classic
11/9/2000*; 5:30PM, ESPN2	No. 7	vs. No. 17 UCLA; Semifinals	W 99–98	1–0	Madison Square Garden (19,528); New York, NY
11/10/2000*; 8:00PM, ESPN	No. 7	vs. St. John's; Championship Game	W 82–74	2–0	Madison Square Garden (19,528); New York, NY
Regular season
11/17/2000*; 7:05PM, Jayhawk-TV	No. 4	North Dakota	W 92–61	3–0	Allen Fieldhouse (16,300); Lawrence, KS
11/20/2000*; 7:05PM, Jayhawk-TV	No. 4	Boise State	W 101–61	4–0	Allen Fieldhouse (15,600); Lawrence, KS
11/25/2000*; 7:05PM, Jayhawk-TV	No. 3	Washburn	W 99–56	5–0	Allen Fieldhouse (16,300); Lawrence, KS
11/27/2000*; 7:05PM, Jayhawk-TV	No. 3	Middle Tennessee State	W 92–66	6–0	Allen Fieldhouse (15,700); Lawrence, KS
11/30/2000*; 7:00PM, Jayhawk-TV	No. 2	Illinois State	W 80–61	7–0	Allen Fieldhouse (16,100); Lawrence, KS
12/7/2000*; 6:00PM, ESPN	No. 3	at No. 11 Wake Forest	L 53–84	7–1	Lawrence Joel Coliseum (12,143); Winston-Salem, NC
12/12/2000*; 8:00PM, ESPN	No. 10	at DePaul	W 75–69	8–1	United Center (10,134); Chicago, IL
12/16/2000*; 8:05PM, ESPN	No. 10	Tulsa	W 92–69	9–1	Allen Fieldhouse (16,300); Lawrence, KS
12/23/2000*; 3:00PM, CBS	No. 9	at Ohio State	W 69–68	10–1	Value City Arena (19,200); Columbus, OH
12/30/2000*; 8:00PM, Jayhawk-TV	No. 7	SW Missouri State	W 77–43	11–1	Kemper Arena (15,500); Kansas City, MO
1/6/2001; 8:00PM, Big 12 (ESPN+)	No. 7	at Texas Tech	W 94–82	12–1	United Spirit Arena (11,820); Lubbock, TX
1/13/2001; 12:00PM, ABC	No. 5	at No. 22 Oklahoma	W 69–61	13–1	Lloyd Noble Center (11,183); Norman, OK
1/17/2001; 8:00PM, Big 12 (ESPN+)	No. 5	Nebraska	W 84–62	14–1	Allen Fieldhouse (16,300); Lawrence, KS
1/20/2001; 3:00PM, Big 12 (ESPN+)	No. 5	Texas A&M	W 100–70	15–1	Allen Fieldhouse (16,300); Lawrence, KS
1/22/2001; 8:00PM, ESPN	No. 5	at Colorado	W 85–75	16–1	Coors Events Center (11,075); Boulder, CO
1/27/2001; 3:00PM, Big 12 (ESPN+)	No. 4	Kansas State; Sunflower Showdown	W 92–66	17–1	Allen Fieldhouse (16,300); Lawrence, KS
1/29/2001; 3:00PM, ESPN	No. 4	at Missouri; Border War	L 66–75	17–2	Hearnes Center (13,545); Columbia, MO
2/3/2001; 12:00PM, CBS	No. 3	Texas	W 82–66	18–2	Allen Fieldhouse (16,300); Lawrence, KS
2/5/2001; 8:00PM, ESPN	No. 5	No. 12 Iowa State	L 77–79	18–3	Allen Fieldhouse (16,300); Lawrence, KS
2/10/2001; 3:00PM, Big 12 (ESPN+)	No. 5	Oklahoma State	W 77–61	19–3	Allen Fieldhouse (16,300); Lawrence, KS
2/12/2001; 8:00PM, ESPN2	No. 6	at Baylor	L 77–85	19–4	Ferrell Center (9,523); Waco, TX
2/17/2001; 12:00PM, CBS	No. 6	at No. 7 Iowa State	L 71–79	19–5	James H. Hilton Coliseum (14,092); Ames, IA
2/21/2001; 7:00PM, Big 12 (ESPN+)	No. 11	Colorado	W 91–79	20–5	Allen Fieldhouse (16,100); Lawrence, KS
2/25/2001; 2:30PM, ABC	No. 11	at Nebraska	W 78–74	21–5	Bob Devaney Sports Center (12,104); Lincoln, NE
2/28/2001; 8:00PM, Big 12 (ESPN+)	No. 10	at Kansas State; Sunflower Showdown	W 77–65	22–5	Bramlage Coliseum (11,043); Manhattan, KS
3/4/2001; 1:00PM, CBS	No. 10	Missouri; Border War	W 75–59	23–5	Allen Fieldhouse (16,300); Lawrence, KS
Big 12 tournament
3/9/2001; 6:00PM, Big 12 (ESPN+)	No. 9	vs. Kansas State; Quarterfinals; Sunflower Showdown	W 94–63	24–5	Kemper Arena (18,000); Kansas City, MO
3/10/2001; 12:00PM, Big 12 (ESPN+)	No. 9	vs. No. 16 Oklahoma; Semifinals	L 57–62	24–6	Kemper Arena (19,100); Kansas City, MO
NCAA tournament
3/16/2001*; 6:35PM, CBS	No. 12 (4)	vs. (13) Cal State Northridge; First Round	W 99–75	25–6	University of Dayton Arena (13,133); Dayton, OH
3/18/2001*; 11:10AM, CBS	No. 12 (4)	vs. No. 17 (5) Syracuse; Second Round	W 87–58	26–6	University of Dayton Arena (13,159); Dayton, OH
3/23/2001*; 9:15PM, CBS	No. 12 (4)	vs. No. 4 (1) Illinois; Sweet Sixteen	L 64–80	26–7	Alamodome (28,962); San Antonio, TX
*Non-conference game. ^{#}Rankings from AP Poll, NCAA tournament seeds shown in parentheses. (#) Tournament seedings in parentheses. All times are in Central Standard Time.

== Rankings ==
Ranking movements Legend: ██ Increase in ranking ██ Decrease in ranking
	Week																			
Poll	Pre	1	2	3	4	5	6	7	8	9	10	11	12	13	14	15	16	17	18	Final
AP	7	4	3	2	3	10	9	7	7	5	5	4	3	5	6	11	10	9	12	Not released
Coaches	6	6*	4	4	4	8	9	8	7	5	5	4	3	5	6	10	11	10	12	7

*There was no week 2 coaches poll.

== See also ==
- 2001 NCAA Division I men's basketball tournament
- 2001 Big 12 men's basketball tournament
- 2000-01 NCAA Division I men's basketball season
- 2000–01 NCAA Division I men's basketball rankings
