= 1982–83 Missouri Tigers men's basketball team =

American college basketball season

1982–83 Missouri Tigers men's basketball

Big Eight Regular Season Champions

NCAA tournament, Second Round
- Conference: Big Eight Conference

Ranking
- Coaches: No. 12
- AP: No. 10
- Record: 26–8 (12–2 Big 8)
- Head coach: Norm Stewart (16th season)
- Home arena: Hearnes Center

1982–83 Big Eight Conference men's basketball standings
	Conf.				Overall
Team	W		L	PCT	W		L	PCT
No. 10 Missouri	12	–	2	.857	26	–	8	.765
Oklahoma	10	–	4	.714	24	–	9	.727
No. 19 Oklahoma State †	9	–	5	.643	24	–	7	.774
Nebraska	9	–	5	.643	22	–	10	.688
Iowa State	5	–	9	.357	13	–	15	.464
Kansas State	4	–	10	.286	12	–	16	.429
Kansas	4	–	10	.286	13	–	16	.448
Colorado	3	–	11	.214	13	–	15	.464
† 1983 Big Eight tournament winner Rankings from AP Poll

The 1982–83 Missouri Tigers men's basketball team represented the University of Missouri as a member of the Big Eight Conference during the 1982–83 NCAA men's basketball season. Led by head coach Norm Stewart, the Tigers won the Big Eight regular season title, reached the second round of the NCAA tournament, and finished with an overall record of 26–8 (12–2 Big Eight).

== Roster ==
- Steve Stipanovich, Sr.
- Jon Sundvold, Sr.
- Head coach: Norm Stewart

== Schedule and results ==
Date time, TV	Rank^{#}	Opponent^{#}	Result	Record	Site (attendance) city, state
Regular season
Nov 27, 1982*; CBS	No. 15	vs. No. 3 North Carolina	W 64–60	1–0	St. Louis Arena; St. Louis, MO
Nov 30, 1982*	No. 9	Augustana (SD)	W 85–55	2–0	Hearnes Center; Columbia, Missouri
Dec 6, 1982*	No. 8	Temple	W 76–68	3–0	Hearnes Center; Columbia, Missouri
Dec 8, 1982*	No. 8	Jackson State	W 86–51	4–0	Hearnes Center; Columbia, Missouri
Dec 11, 1982*	No. 8	Oregon State	W 87–59	5–0	Hearnes Center; Columbia, Missouri
Dec 13, 1982*	No. 8	Eastern Illinois	W 76–61	6–0	Hearnes Center; Columbia, Missouri
Dec 20, 1982*	No. 6	Tennessee-Martin	W 71–58	7–0	Hearnes Center; Columbia, Missouri
Dec 23, 1982*	No. 6	at Washington	L 48–55	7–1	Hec Edmundson Pavilion; Seattle, Washington
Dec 27, 1982*	No. 12	vs. Arizona State; Rainbow Classic	W 48–47	8–1	Neal S. Blaisdell Center; Honolulu, Hawaii
Dec 29, 1982*	No. 12	at Hawaii; Rainbow Classic	W 73–58	9–1	Neal S. Blaisdell Center; Honolulu, Hawaii
Dec 30, 1982*	No. 12	vs. North Carolina; Rainbow Classic	L 58–73	9–2	Neal S. Blaisdell Center; Honolulu, Hawaii
Jan 9, 1983*	No. 15	No. 16 NC State	W 49–42	10–2	Hearnes Center; Columbia, Missouri
Jan 12, 1983*	No. 14	Northern Iowa	W 91–62	11–2	Hearnes Center; Columbia, Missouri
Jan 15, 1983*	No. 14	Dayton	W 78–64	12–2	Hearnes Center; Columbia, Missouri
Jan 19, 1983	No. 12	No. 18 Oklahoma State	W 84–63	13–2 (1–0)	Hearnes Center; Columbia, Missouri
Jan 22, 1983	No. 12	Oklahoma	W 48–41	14–2 (2–0)	Hearnes Center; Columbia, Missouri
Jan 23, 1983*; NBC	No. 12	Marquette	L 59–60 ^{OT}	14–3	Hearnes Center; Columbia, Missouri
Jan 26, 1983	No. 13	at Kansas	W 76–63	15–3 (3–0)	Allen Fieldhouse; Lawrence, Kansas
Jan 29, 1983	No. 13	Nebraska	W 79–56	16–3 (4–0)	Hearnes Center; Columbia, Missouri
Feb 2, 1983	No. 10	at Colorado	W 68–65 ^{2OT}	17–3 (5–0)	Coors Events/Conference Center; Boulder, Colorado
Feb 5, 1983; NBC	No. 10	Kansas State	W 82–50	18–3 (6–0)	Hearnes Center; Columbia, Missouri
Feb 8, 1983; ESPN	No. 10	at Iowa State	L 72–73 ^{OT}	18–4 (6–1)	Hilton Coliseum; Ames, Iowa
Feb 12, 1983	No. 10	at Oklahoma	W 84–79 ^{OT}	19–4 (7–1)	Lloyd Noble Center; Norman, Oklahoma
Feb 17, 1983; ESPN	No. 12	Kansas	W 74–69	20–4 (8–1)	Hearnes Center; Columbia, Missouri
Feb 19, 1983	No. 12	at Oklahoma State	L 73–79	20–5 (8–2)	Gallagher-Iba Arena; Stillwater, Oklahoma
Feb 20, 1983*; CBS	No. 12	vs. No. 5 Virginia	L 53–68	20–6	Brendan Byrne Arena (15,767); East Rutherford, New Jersey
Feb 23, 1983*	No. 15	Colorado	W 88–53	21–6 (9–2)	Hearnes Center; Columbia, Missouri
Feb 26, 1983	No. 15	at Nebraska	W 54–51	22–6 (10–2)	Bob Devaney Sports Center; Lincoln, Nebraska
Mar 1, 1983; ESPN	No. 13	at Kansas State	W 49–47	23–6 (11–2)	Ahearn Field House; Manhattan, Kansas
Mar 5, 1983	No. 13	Iowa State	W 84–66	24–6 (12–2)	Hearnes Center; Columbia, MO
Big Eight Conference tournament
Mar 10, 1983*	No. 12	Colorado; Big Eight tournament quarterfinal	W 88–73	25–6	Hearnes Center; Columbia, MO
Mar 11, 1983*	No. 12	vs. Nebraska; Big Eight tournament semifinal	W 69–63	26–6	Kemper Arena; Kansas City, MO
Mar 12, 1983*; CBS	No. 12	vs. Oklahoma State; Big Eight tournament Championship	L 92–93 ^{2OT}	26–7	Kemper Arena; Kansas City, MO
NCAA tournament
Mar 20, 1983*	(2 MW) No. 10	vs. (7 MW) Iowa; Second Round	L 63–77	26–8	Freedom Hall; Louisville, KY
*Non-conference game. ^{#}Rankings from AP. (#) Tournament seedings in parentheses. MW=Midwest. All times are in Central.

== Rankings ==
Ranking movements Legend: ██ Increase in ranking ██ Decrease in ranking
	Week																
Poll	Pre	1	2	3	4	5	6	7	8	9	10	11	12	13	14	15	Final
AP	15	9	8	8	6	12	15	14	12	13	10	10	12	15	13	12	10
Coaches	14	14	8	8	6	12	15	15	11	13	10	8	10	12	9	9	12

== Awards ==
- Steve Stipanovich – co-Big Eight Player of the Year
