= 1982–83 Oklahoma Sooners men's basketball team =

American college basketball season

1982–83 Oklahoma Sooners men's basketball

NCAA Men's Division I Tournament, Second Round
- Conference: Big 8 Conference
- Record: 24–9 (10–4 Big 8)
- Head coach: Billy Tubbs (3rd season)
- Assistant coach: Mike Newell (3rd season)
- Home arena: Lloyd Noble Center (Capacity: 11,528)

1982–83 Big Eight Conference men's basketball standings
	Conf.				Overall
Team	W		L	PCT	W		L	PCT
No. 10 Missouri	12	–	2	.857	26	–	8	.765
Oklahoma	10	–	4	.714	24	–	9	.727
No. 19 Oklahoma State †	9	–	5	.643	24	–	7	.774
Nebraska	9	–	5	.643	22	–	10	.688
Iowa State	5	–	9	.357	13	–	15	.464
Kansas State	4	–	10	.286	12	–	16	.429
Kansas	4	–	10	.286	13	–	16	.448
Colorado	3	–	11	.214	13	–	15	.464
† 1983 Big Eight tournament winner Rankings from AP Poll

The 1982–83 Oklahoma Sooners men's basketball team represented the University of Oklahoma in competitive college basketball during the 1982–83 NCAA Division I season. The Oklahoma Sooners men's basketball team played its home games in the Lloyd Noble Center and was a member of the National Collegiate Athletic Association's (NCAA) former Big Eight Conference at that time. The team posted a 24–9 overall record and a 10–4 conference record to finish second in the Conference for head coach Billy Tubbs.

The team was led by All American and Big Eight Conference Men's Basketball Player of the Year Wayman Tisdale. Oklahoma lost in the quarterfinals of the Big Eight Tournament to Kansas. The team received a bid to the 1983 NCAA Division I men's basketball tournament as No. 7 seed in the Mideast region. After an opening round win over UAB, the Sooners lost to Indiana in the second round.

Over the course of the season, Wayman Tisdale established school records for single-game points (51) and single-season points (810).

== Roster ==
1982–83 Oklahoma Sooners men's basketball team
Players
Coaches

Pos.	#	Name	Height	Weight	Year	Previous school	Hometown
F	10	David Little	6 ft 7 in (2.01 m)	210 lb (95 kg)	Sr	Abilene	Abilene, Texas
G	11	Jan Pannell	6 ft 1 in (1.85 m)	175 lb (79 kg)	Jr	McKinley	Washington, D.C.
G	20	Bo Overton	6 ft 3 in (1.91 m)	—	Sr	Ada	Ada, Oklahoma
G	22	William Tisdale	6 ft 4 in (1.93 m)	210 lb (95 kg)	Fr	Booker T. Washington	Tulsa, Oklahoma
F	23	Wayman Tisdale	6 ft 9 in (2.06 m)	240 lb (109 kg)	Fr	Booker T. Washington	Tulsa, Oklahoma

Head coach

- Billy Tubbs (Lamar)

Assistant coach(es)

Legend

- (C) Team captain
- (S) Suspended
- (I) Ineligible
- (W) Walk-on
- Injured
- Current redshirt

Roster

== Schedule and results ==
Date time, TV	Rank^{#}	Opponent^{#}	Result	Record	Site city, state
Regular Season
November 27, 1982*		at No. 20 UNLV	L 54–65	0–1	Las Vegas Convention Center; Las Vegas, NV
November 30, 1982*		Auburn Montgomery	W 104–83	1–1	Lloyd Noble Center; Norman, OK
December 4, 1982*		Tulsa	L 76–79	1–2	Lloyd Noble Center; Norman, OK
December 6, 1982*		Abilene Christian	W 110–61	2–2	Lloyd Noble Center; Norman, OK
December 8, 1982*		Westmont	W 85–62	3–2	Lloyd Noble Center; Norman, OK
December 11, 1982*		West Texas State	W 117–85	4–2	Lloyd Noble Center; Norman, OK
December 13, 1982*		Idaho State	W 99–75	5–2	Lloyd Noble Center; Norman, OK
December 18, 1982*		Georgia Tech	W 101–73	6–2	Lloyd Noble Center; Norman, OK
December 23, 1982*		Illinois	W 101–75	7–2	Lloyd Noble Center; Norman, OK
December 28, 1982*		vs. Virginia Tech; Rainbow Classic	W 88–86 ^{OT}	8–2	Neal S. Blaisdell Center; Honolulu, HI
December 29, 1982*		vs. North Carolina; Rainbow Classic	L 69–77	8–3	Neal S. Blaisdell Center; Honolulu, HI
December 30, 1982*		at Hawaii; Rainbow Classic	W 96–85	9–3	Neal S. Blaisdell Center; Honolulu, HI
January 6, 1983*		Charleston Southern	W 78–56	10–3	Lloyd Noble Center; Norman, OK
January 8, 1983*		Rider	W 103–64	11–3	Lloyd Noble Center; Norman, OK
January 12, 1983*		Oklahoma City	W 104–58	12–3	Lloyd Noble Center; Norman, OK
January 15, 1983*		St. Mary's (TX)	W 83–69	13–3	Lloyd Noble Center; Norman, OK
January 20, 1983		Kansas	W 95–72	14–3 (1–0)	Lloyd Noble Center; Norman, OK
January 22, 1983		at No. 12 Missouri	L 41–48	14–4 (1–1)	Hearnes Center; Columbia, MO
January 27, 1983		No. 20 Oklahoma State; Bedlam Series	W 81–80	15–4 (2–1)	Lloyd Noble Center; Norman, OK
January 29, 1983		Colorado	W 97–79	16–4 (3–1)	Lloyd Noble Center; Norman, OK
February 2, 1983		at Nebraska	L 59–60	16–5 (3–2)	Bob Devaney Sports Center; Lincoln, NE
February 5, 1983		Iowa State	W 102–74	17–5 (4–2)	Lloyd Noble Center; Norman, OK
February 9, 1983		at Kansas State	W 64–62	18–5 (5–2)	Ahearn Field House; Manhattan, KS
February 12, 1983		No. 10 Missouri	L 79–84	18–6 (5–3)	Lloyd Noble Center; Norman, OK
February 16, 1983	No. 19	at Oklahoma State; Bedlam Series	W 64–63	19–6 (6–3)	Gallagher Hall; Stillwater, OK
February 19, 1983	No. 19	at Kansas	L 53–55	19–7 (6–4)	Allen Fieldhouse; Lawrence, KS
February 24, 1983*		Nebraska	W 84–71	20–7 (7–4)	Lloyd Noble Center; Norman, OK
February 26, 1983		at Colorado	W 94–84	21–7 (8–4)	CU Events Center; Boulder, CO
March 2, 1983		at Iowa State	W 67–65 ^{OT}	22–7 (9–4)	Hilton Coliseum; Ames, IA
March 5, 1983		Kansas State	W 72–70	23–7 (10–4)	Lloyd Noble Center; Norman, OK
Big Eight tournament
March 10, 1983*	(2) No. 19	(7) Kansas; Quarterfinal	L 77–87	23–8	Lloyd Noble Center; Norman, OK
NCAA tournament
March 18, 1983*	(7 ME)	vs. (10 ME) UAB; First round	W 71–63	24–8	Roberts Municipal Stadium; Evansville, IN
March 20, 1983*	(7 ME)	vs. (2 ME) No. 5 Indiana; Second round	L 49–63	24–9	Roberts Municipal Stadium; Evansville, IN
*Non-conference game. ^{#}Rankings from AP Poll. (#) Tournament seedings in parentheses. ME=Mideast.

== Honors ==
- All-American: Wayman Tisdale (1st of 3 times)
- Big Eight POY: Tisdale
