= Randy Rutherford =

American basketball coach and player

Personal information
- Born: December 4, 1971 (age 54) Idabel, Oklahoma, U.S.
- Listed height: 6 ft 3 in (1.91 m)
- Listed weight: 188 lb (85 kg)

Career information
- High school: Broken Bow (Broken Bow, Oklahoma)
- College: Bacone JC (1990–1991); Oklahoma State (1992–1995)
- NBA draft: 1995: undrafted
- Playing career: 1996–2003
- Position: Guard
- Coaching career: 2004–present

Career history

Playing
- 1996: Oklahoma City Cavalry
- 1996–1997: Andorra
- 1997–1998: KTP Basket
- 1998–1999: PAEEK
- 1999–2000: Canberra Cannons
- 2000–2003: Brisbane Bullets

Coaching
- 2004–2008: Oklahoma State (assistant)
- 2008–2009: Central HS
- 2009–2011: Murray State College
- 2018–2025: McLain HS
- 2025–present: Claremore HS

Career highlights
- As player: All-NBL Second Team (2002); NBL scoring champion (2002); All-Big Eight Team (1995); Big Eight All-Defensive Team (1995)

Randy Rutherford (born December 4, 1971) is an American basketball coach and former professional player. Rutherford had a three-year college career with Oklahoma State, where as a senior in 1995 he helped the Cowboys make their first Final Four appearance in 45 years. He went on to play professionally in Spain, Finland, Cyprus and Australia. With the Brisbane Bullets in Australia, he led the league in scoring and earned All-NBL Second Team honors in 2002.

== Early life ==
Born in Idabel, Oklahoma, Rutherford was raised in the nearby football-crazed town of Broken Bow. He grew up playing football, but gave it up to concentrate on basketball. He also played baseball as a child alongside his five brothers.

Rutherford attended Broken Bow High School, where he played three years of basketball for the Savages. He averaged 28.6 points and 14.6 rebounds as a senior in 1989–90, leading Class 4A in scoring while finishing second in rebounding. He had a 49-point performance during the season and was named the Oklahoma Basketball Coaches Association's 1990 Player of the Year. He was also a successful long jumper in high school.

== College career ==
In the fall of 1989, Rutherford signed a letter of intent with the Oklahoma State Cowboys. However, by the end of his senior year at Broken Bow, he had not qualified academically for Division I after not meeting Proposition 48 guidelines. Rutherford initially indicated he would attend OSU and sit out the 1990–91 season after learning he was only one point shy of the necessary 18 on his ACT. But two weeks after making his decision public, he changed his mind. Rather than miss a season of basketball, Rutherford enrolled at Bacone College. His plan was to graduate from Bacone in three semesters and then transfer to OSU midway through his sophomore year. During the 1990–91 season, Rutherford averaged 17 points and five rebounds for the Warriors.

In November 1991, Rutherford signed a financial aid agreement with OSU. He successfully transferred to OSU midterm and redshirted in the spring of 1992 to maintain three years of eligibility.

Rutherford was a three-year letterman for Oklahoma State from 1992–95. He had a memorable senior season, averaging 19.6 points and 8.4 rebounds per game during the Cowboys' 1994–95 campaign. He had 45 points with 11 3-pointers in a game against the Kansas Jayhawks on March 1, 1995. He finished as the Big Eight Conference record-holder for 3-pointers in a season and a career, while earning All-Big Eight honors and making the Big Eight's all-defensive team. He led the team to a Big Eight tournament championship and the Cowboys' first Final Four appearance in 45 years, helping the Cowboys put together a memorable NCAA tournament run, upsetting No. 1 Wake Forest and No. 2 UMass. In a Sweet Sixteen victory over Wake Forest, Rutherford had 23 points and 11 rebounds, and in the East Regional final, he scored 19 points in a win over UMass to earn Oklahoma State's first Final Four appearance since 1951. Oklahoma State lost to eventual national champion UCLA 74–61 in the semifinals, despite Rutherford's 15 points. He averaged 18.2 points in five NCAA Tournament games. In 99 collegiate games over his three-year career, Rutherford averaged 15.6 points, 5.9 rebounds, 2.4 assists and 1.2 steals per game.

== Professional career ==
A lack of height and poor performances in numerous NBA draft camps, combined with a court appearance in May 1995, led to Rutherford dropping to second-round pick contention in the 1995 NBA draft. He ultimately went undrafted and was picked up by the Oklahoma City Cavalry in the third round of the CBA draft in September 1995. He did not join the Cavalry however, deciding instead to return to OSU to complete his degree.

In October 1996, Rutherford signed with the Oklahoma City Cavalry. He began the 1996–97 season with the Cavalry, but left the team after just three games. He subsequently moved to Spain, where he played in the second division for Andorra. In 13 games during the 1996–97 LEB season, he averaged 14.9 points per game.

For the 1997–98 season, Rutherford played in Finland for KTP Basket. He moved to Cyprus for the 1998–99 season, where he played for PAEEK.

For the 1999–2000 season, Rutherford moved to Australia to play for the Canberra Cannons in the NBL. In 28 games for the Cannons, he averaged 23.9 points, 5.0 rebounds, 2.4 assists and 1.0 steals per game.

Rutherford remained in the NBL for the 2000–01 season, joining the Brisbane Bullets. In 27 games in his first season with the Bullets, he averaged 19.3 points, 5.2 rebounds, 3.3 assists and 1.1 steals per game. In his second season with the Bullets, Rutherford earned All-NBL Second Team honors and led the league in scoring with 25.0 points per game. In 30 games, he also averaged 5.9 rebounds, 2.8 assists and 1.2 steals per game. His third season with the Bullets ended prematurely after he was cut with three games to go. In 26 games, he averaged 17.4 points, 5.7 rebounds, 3.1 assists and 1.1 steals per game.

On July 22, 2003, Rutherford signed with APOEL of the Cyprus Basketball League. After failing to satisfy the coach, he was released on September 2, 2003, prior to the start of the season.

== Coaching career ==
After retiring from playing basketball, Rutherford returned to OSU and served as an assistant strength and conditioning coach for four years. He was on the coaching staff in 2004 when the Cowboys went back to the Final Four in the NCAA tournament.

In May 2008, Rutherford was appointed head coach of the boys basketball team at Tulsa Central. In his lone season as coach of the Braves, he guided Central to an area tournament championship and an appearance in the Class 4A State Tournament. The Braves, who played against many Class 5A and Class 6A teams during the regular season, finished 13–13.

In March 2009, Rutherford resigned as coach of Central to become the men's coach at Murray State College. He coached at Murray State for two years.

In July 2018, Rutherford was appointed head coach of the boys basketball team at McLain High School in Tulsa. He originally committed to a four-year plan with the Titans but went on to coach McLain for seven years. In the 2023–24 season, he helped the Titans reach the 20-win mark for just the second time since 1993–94.

In June 2025, Rutherford was appointed head coach of the boys basketball team and dean of students at Claremore High School in Claremore, Oklahoma.
