= Paul Hansen (basketball) =

American basketball coach (1928–1993)

Biographical details
- Born: December 6, 1928; Hull, Iowa, U.S.
- Died: January 18, 1993 (aged 64); Oklahoma City, Oklahoma, U.S.

Playing career
- 1947–1951: Oklahoma City

Coaching career (HC unless noted)
- 1951–1954: Noble HS
- 1955: Jackson JHS
- 1956–1973: Oklahoma City (assistant)
- 1973–1979: Oklahoma City
- 1979–1986: Oklahoma State
- 1986–1991: USAO

Accomplishments and honors

Championships
- Big Eight tournament (1983)

Paul Hansen (December 6, 1928 – January 18, 1993) was an American basketball coach. He was the head men's basketball coach at Oklahoma City University, Oklahoma State University–Stillwater, and University of Science and Arts of Oklahoma (USAO). Prior to the becoming a head coach, he acted as an assistant to iconic Oklahoma City University coach, Abe Lemons for 18 seasons. Hansen, born in Iowa, but raised in Oklahoma City, played college basketball at the Oklahoma City University. He began his coaching career at Noble High School, before returning to his alma mater. After Lemmons left OCU to coach Pan American, Hansen moved into the lead role. Hansen led Oklahoma City to three consecutive winning seasons, where he coached Allen Leavell who went onto 10 seasons in the NBA. Hansen then became Oklahoma State's head men's basketball coach in 1979. He led the Cowboys to their first 20 win season and NCAA tournament appearance since 1965. Hansen was let go from the Cowboys in 1986 and became the head coach at University of Science and Arts of Oklahoma in Chickasha, Oklahoma. He guided the USAO Drovers through 1991 before retiring. Hansen died on January 18, 1993; he was 64 years old. Paul Hansen was married and he and his wife, Carol, had five daughters, Elizabeth, Patti, Judith, Mary and Heidi.

== College Head Coaching Record ==
Record table
Season	Team	Overall	Conference	Standing	Postseason
Oklahoma City Chiefs (Independent) (1973–1978)
1973–74	Oklahoma City	13–13			
1974–75	Oklahoma City	12–14			
1975–76	Oklahoma City	9–18			
1976–77	Oklahoma City	14–12			
1977–78	Oklahoma City	16–11			
Oklahoma City Chiefs (Trans America Athletic Conference) (1978–1979)
1978–79	Oklahoma City	18–11	5–0	3rd	
Oklahoma City:		82–79 (.509)	5–0 (1.000)		
Oklahoma State Cowboys (Big Eight) (1979–1986)
1979–80	Oklahoma State	10–17	4–10	8th	
1980–81	Oklahoma State	18–9	8–6	5th	
1981–82	Oklahoma State	15–12	7–7	5th	
1982–83	Oklahoma State	24–7	9–5	3rd	NCAA Division I first round
1983–84	Oklahoma State	13–15	5–9	7th	
1984–85	Oklahoma State	12–16	3–11	8th	
1985–86	Oklahoma State	15–13	6–8	6th	
Oklahoma State:		107–89 (.546)	42–56 (.429)		
USAO Drovers (Sooner Athletic Conference) (1986–1991)
USAO:		77–66 (.538)			
Total:		266–234 (.532)			
