= 1982–83 Oklahoma State Cowboys basketball team =

American college basketball season

1982–83 Oklahoma State Cowboys basketball

Big Eight tournament champions

NCAA tournament
- Conference: Big Eight Conference

Ranking
- Coaches: No. 19
- AP: No. 19
- Record: 24–7 (9–5 Big Eight)
- Head coach: Paul Hansen (4th season)
- Assistant coaches: Darrel Johnson (1st season); John Gray (1st season)
- Home arena: Gallagher-Iba Arena (Capacity: 6,381)

1982–83 Big Eight Conference men's basketball standings
| | Conf. | | | | Overall |
| Team | W | | L | PCT | W | | L | PCT |
|---|---|---|---|---|---|---|---|---|
| No. 10 Missouri | 12 | – | 2 | .857 | 26 | – | 8 | .765 |
| Oklahoma | 10 | – | 4 | .714 | 24 | – | 9 | .727 |
| No. 19 Oklahoma State † | 9 | – | 5 | .643 | 24 | – | 7 | .774 |
| Nebraska | 9 | – | 5 | .643 | 22 | – | 10 | .688 |
| Iowa State | 5 | – | 9 | .357 | 13 | – | 15 | .464 |
| Kansas State | 4 | – | 10 | .286 | 12 | – | 16 | .429 |
| Kansas | 4 | – | 10 | .286 | 13 | – | 16 | .448 |
| Colorado | 3 | – | 11 | .214 | 13 | – | 15 | .464 |
† 1983 Big Eight tournament winner Rankings from AP Poll

The 1982–83 Oklahoma State Cowboys basketball team represented Oklahoma State University as a member of the Big Eight Conference during the 1982–83 NCAA Division I men's basketball season. The team was led by fourth-year head coach Paul Hansen and played their home games at Gallagher-Iba Arena. The Cowboys finished with a record of 24–7 (9–5 Big Eight) to finish tied for third in the Big Eight regular season standings.

Oklahoma State won the Big Eight tournament by prevailing over Missouri in double overtime in the championship game. The Cowboys received an automatic bid to the NCAA tournament as No. 5 seed in the West region, making their first appearance in the NCAA Tournament since 1965. The team was upset by No. 12 seed Princeton in the opening round.

== Roster ==
1982–83 Oklahoma State Cowboys men's basketball team
Players
Coaches

| Pos. | # | Name | Height | Weight | Year | Previous school | Hometown |
|---|---|---|---|---|---|---|---|
| G | 20 | Bill Self | 6 ft 2 in (1.88 m) | — | So | Edmond Memorial | Okmulgee, Oklahoma |
| F | 32 | Leroy Combs | 6 ft 8 in (2.03 m) | 205 lb (93 kg) | Sr | Star Spencer | Oklahoma City, Oklahoma |

Head coach

- Paul Hansen

Assistant coach(es)

- Darrel Johnson
- John Gray

Legend

- (C) Team captain
- (S) Suspended
- (I) Ineligible
- (W) Walk-on
- Injured
- Current redshirt

== Schedule and results ==
| Date time, TV | Rank^{#} | Opponent^{#} | Result | Record | Site (attendance) city, state |
Regular season
| Nov 29, 1982* | | Houston Baptist | W 73–51 | 1–0 | Gallagher-Iba Arena; Stillwater, Oklahoma |
| Dec 2, 1982* | | College of the Ozarks | W 80–61 | 2–0 | Gallagher-Iba Arena; Stillwater, Oklahoma |
| Dec 4, 1982* | | Dallas Baptist | W 83–56 | 3–0 | Gallagher-Iba Arena; Stillwater, Oklahoma |
| Dec 7, 1982* | | at Tulsa | W 93–75 | 4–0 | Tulsa Convention Center; Tulsa, Oklahoma |
| Dec 11, 1982* | | at Saint Louis | W 61–58 | 5–0 | Kiel Auditorium; St. Louis, Missouri |
| Dec 18, 1982* | | at No. 12 Louisville | L 66–67 | 5–1 | Freedom Hall; Louisville, Kentucky |
| Dec 20, 1982* | | vs. Michigan; Blade City Classic | W 78–70 ^{OT} | 6–1 | Centennial Hall; Toledo, Ohio |
| Dec 21, 1982* | | at Toledo; Blade City Classic | W 76–59 | 7–1 | Centennial Hall; Toledo, Ohio |
| Dec 28, 1982* | | vs. Houston Baptist | W 50–39 | 8–1 | Frederickson Fieldhouse; Oklahoma City, Oklahoma |
| Dec 29, 1982* | | at Oklahoma City | W 76–64 | 9–1 | Frederickson Fieldhouse; Oklahoma City, Oklahoma |
| Jan 8, 1983* | | Texas-Arlington | W 90–83 | 10–1 | Gallagher-Iba Arena; Stillwater, Oklahoma |
| Jan 11, 1983* | | Oral Roberts | W 108–82 | 11–1 | Gallagher-Iba Arena; Stillwater, Oklahoma |
| Jan 15, 1983* | | Centenary | W 78–65 | 12–1 | Gallagher-Iba Arena; Stillwater, Oklahoma |
| Jan 19, 1983 | No. 18 | at No. 12 Missouri | L 63–84 | 12–2 (0–1) | Hearnes Center; Columbia, Missouri |
| Jan 22, 1983 | No. 18 | Kansas | W 85–74 | 13–2 (1–1) | Gallagher-Iba Arena; Stillwater, Oklahoma |
| Jan 27, 1983 | No. 20 | at Oklahoma | L 80–81 | 13–3 (1–2) | Lloyd Noble Center; Norman, Oklahoma |
| Jan 29, 1983 | No. 20 | at Iowa State | L 64–73 | 13–4 (1–3) | Hilton Coliseum; Ames, Iowa |
| Feb 1, 1983 | | Kansas State | W 71–47 | 14–4 (2–3) | Gallagher-Iba Arena; Stillwater, Oklahoma |
| Feb 5, 1983 | | at Colorado | W 96–91 ^{4OT} | 15–4 (3–3) | Coors Events/Conference Center; Boulder, Colorado |
| Feb 9, 1983 | | Nebraska | W 71–63 ^{2OT} | 16–4 (4–3) | Gallagher-Iba Arena; Stillwater, Oklahoma |
| Feb 12, 1983 | | at Kansas | W 75–69 | 17–4 (5–3) | Allen Fieldhouse; Lawrence, Kansas |
| Feb 16, 1983 | | No. 19 Oklahoma | L 63–64 | 17–5 (5–4) | Gallagher-Iba Arena; Stillwater, Oklahoma |
| Feb 19, 1983 | | No. 12 Missouri | W 79–73 | 18–5 (6–4) | Gallagher-Iba Arena; Stillwater, Oklahoma |
| Feb 23, 1983 | | at Kansas State | W 76–58 | 19–5 (7–4) | Ahearn Field House; Manhattan, Kansas |
| Feb 26, 1983 | | Iowa State | W 78–70 | 20–5 (8–4) | Gallagher-Iba Arena; Stillwater, Oklahoma |
| Mar 2, 1983 | | Colorado | W 75–73 | 21–5 (9–4) | Gallagher-Iba Arena; Stillwater, Oklahoma |
| Mar 5, 1983 | | at Nebraska | L 68–77 | 21–6 (9–5) | Bob Devaney Sports Center; Lincoln, Nebraska |
Big Eight tournament
| Mar 10, 1983* | (3) | (6) Kansas State; Quarterfinals | W 75–61 | 22–6 | Gallagher-Iba Arena; Stillwater, Oklahoma |
| Mar 11, 1983* | (3) | vs. (7) Kansas; Semifinals | W 90–83 | 23–6 | Kemper Arena; Kansas City, Missouri |
| Mar 12, 1983* | (3) | vs. (1) No. 12 Missouri; Championship game | W 93–92 ^{2OT} | 24–6 | Kemper Arena; Kansas City, Missouri |
NCAA tournament
| Mar 18, 1983* | (5 W) No. 19 | vs. (12 W) Princeton; First round | L 53–56 | 24–7 | Gill Coliseum; Corvallis, Oregon |
*Non-conference game. ^{#}Rankings from AP Poll. (#) Tournament seedings in parentheses. W=West. All times are in Central Time.
