= Sam Aubrey =

American basketball player and coach (1922–2008)

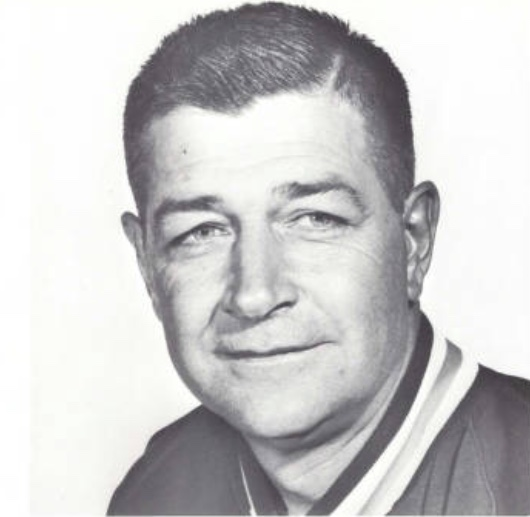
- Aubrey from the 1971 Redskin

Biographical details
- Born: June 15, 1922; Sapulpa, Oklahoma, U.S.
- Died: May 5, 2008 (aged 85)

Playing career
- 1940–1942, 1946: Oklahoma A&M

Coaching career (HC unless noted)
- 1947–1949: Pryor HS
- 1950–1954: Okmulgee Tech JC
- 1954–1970: Oklahoma A&M/Oklahoma State (assistant)
- 1970–1973: Oklahoma State

Head coaching record
- Overall: 18–60 (.231)

Sam Aubrey (June 15, 1922 – May 5, 2008) was the head coach of the Oklahoma State University men's basketball team between 1970 and 1973. Aubrey was the starting forward for the 1946 NCAA men's basketball champions, Oklahoma A&M University under coach Henry Iba.

== Early years, playing career, and military service ==
Aubrey was born in Sapulpa, Oklahoma, and attended Tulsa Central High School. He enrolled at Oklahoma A&M and was offered a partial scholarship by coach Iba. He won a letter as a sophomore for the 1941–42 Oklahoma A&M basketball team that won the Missouri Valley Conference championship. As a junior for the 1942–43 team, he again won a varsity letter as a guard.

Aubrey then enlisted in the Army and won a Silver Star for valor in combat during the Arno-Po campaign in Italy. He also received a Purple Heart after he was shot in the back in September 1944, with the bullet exiting near the front of his left hip. The wound resulted in extensive injuries, including destruction of the large muscle in his left hip, an inability to walk for two months, a cast from his waist down, and a lengthy hospitalization.

After the war, Aubrey returned to Oklahoma A&M and, despite his injuries, returned to the basketball team less than a year after being shot. He started every for the 1945–46 Oklahoma A&M Aggies men's basketball team that won the NCAA championship.

== Coaching career ==
After graduating from Oklahoma A&M in 1946, Aubrey began coaching basketball. He began as the basketball coach at Pryor High School, compiling a 46-29 in three years in that post. He then coached for four years at Oklahoma Tech where he compiled a record of 67-52.

He returned to Oklahoma A&M as the freshman coach in 1953. In 10 seasons as freshman coach, he compiled a record of 62-18. He then became a full-time assistant coach in 1964.

After serving for 16 years as an assistant under Iba, Aubrey succeeded Iba as head coach in February 1970. However, he resigned after winning only 18 games in three seasons, including only seven in Big Eight play.

== Head coaching record ==
Record table
| Season | Team | Overall | Conference | Standing | Postseason |
|---|---|---|---|---|---|
Oklahoma State Cowboys (Big Eight Conference) (1970–1973)
| 1970–71 | Oklahoma State | 7–19 | 2–12 | T–7th | |
| 1971–72 | Oklahoma State | 4–22 | 2–12 | 8th | |
| 1972–73 | Oklahoma State | 7–19 | 3–11 | 8th | |
| Oklahoma State: | | 18–60 (.231) | 7–35 (.167) | | |
| Total: | | 18–60 (.231) | | | |
National champion Postseason invitational champion Conference regular season champion Conference regular season and conference tournament champion Division regular season champion Division regular season and conference tournament champion Conference tournament champion

== Death ==
Aubrey died in May 2008 at a retirement center in Stillwater.
