= Guy R. Strong =

American basketball player and coach (1930–2024)

Biographical details
- Born: June 15, 1930; Irvine, Kentucky, U.S.
- Died: May 19, 2024 (aged 93); Lexington, Kentucky, U.S.
- Education: Eastern Kentucky University

Playing career
- 1949–1951: Kentucky
- 1952–1955: Eastern Kentucky
- Position: Guard

Coaching career (HC unless noted)
- 1963–1967: Kentucky Wesleyan
- 1967–1973: Eastern Kentucky
- 1973–1977: Oklahoma State
- 1983–1990: George Rogers Clark HS
- 1995–2001: George Rogers Clark HS

Head coaching record
- Overall: 186–165 (college)
- Tournaments: 10–2 (NCAA College Division); 0–1 (NCAA University Division)

Accomplishments and honors

Championships
- NCAA College Division champion (1966); OVC regular season champion (1972)

Awards
- OVC Coach of the Year (1972); Inducted into the Kentucky Athletic Hall of Fame (2002)

Guy R. Strong (June 15, 1930 – May 19, 2024) was an American college basketball player and coach. He played as a guard for both the University of Kentucky and Eastern Kentucky University basketball teams. Strong later served as head coach at several institutions, most notably leading Kentucky Wesleyan to a national championship in the 1966 NCAA College Division Tournament. Over his college coaching career, he compiled a record of 186–165 and also held coaching roles at Eastern Kentucky University and Oklahoma State University.

Strong also coached at the high school level, including two stints at George Rogers Clark High School in Winchester, Kentucky. In recognition of his contributions to basketball in the state, he was inducted into the Kentucky Athletic Hall of Fame in 2002.

== Early life ==
Strong was born in Irvine, Kentucky, on June 15, 1930. He graduated from Irvine High School in Estill County, Kentucky, in 1948.

== Career ==
After enrolling at the University of Kentucky, Strong was one of five players—alongside Bill Spivey—who made the final roster following a two-day tryout session. He played for two seasons with the Wildcats, including as a member of the 1951 national championship team. Following his third year, he served in the Korean War, and subsequently transferred to Eastern Kentucky University to complete his collegiate playing career.

As a coach at both the high school and collegiate levels, Strong compiled a combined record of 541–355. He became the first coach to win a national championship at Kentucky Wesleyan College, initiating a legacy that would see the school win seven additional titles—the most in NCAA Division II men's basketball history.

Strong died in Lexington, Kentucky, on May 19, 2024, at the age of 93.

== Head coaching record ==
=== College ===
Record table
| Season | Team | Overall | Conference | Standing | Postseason |
|---|---|---|---|---|---|
Kentucky Wesleyan Panthers (NCAA College Division independent) (1963–1967)
| 1963–64 | Kentucky Wesleyan | 15–8 | | | NCAA College Division Regional Third Place |
| 1964–65 | Kentucky Wesleyan | 9–12 | | | |
| 1965–66 | Kentucky Wesleyan | 24–6 | | | NCAA College Division Champion |
| 1966–67 | Kentucky Wesleyan | 25–4 | | | NCAA College Division Third Place |
| Kentucky Wesleyan: | | 73–30 | | | |
Eastern Kentucky (Ohio Valley Conference) (1967–1973)
| 1967–68 | Eastern Kentucky | 10–14 | 6–8 | 6th | |
| 1968–69 | Eastern Kentucky | 13–9 | 7–7 | 4th | |
| 1969–70 | Eastern Kentucky | 12–10 | 8–6 | T–3rd | |
| 1970–71 | Eastern Kentucky | 16–8 | 10–4 | T–2nd | |
| 1971–72 | Eastern Kentucky | 15–11 | 9–5 | T–1st | NCAA University Division First Round |
| 1972–73 | Eastern Kentucky | 12–13 | 7–7 | T–4th | |
| Eastern Kentucky: | | 78–65 | 47–37 | | |
Oklahoma State Cowboys (Big Eight Conference) (1973–1977)
| 1973–74 | Oklahoma State | 9–17 | 3–11 | 7th | |
| 1974–75 | Oklahoma State | 10–16 | 5–9 | 6th | |
| 1975–76 | Oklahoma State | 10–16 | 4–10 | 6th | |
| 1976–77 | Oklahoma State | 6–21 | 4–10 | 7th | |
| Oklahoma State: | | 35–70 | 16–40 | | |
| Total: | | 186–165 | | | |
National champion Postseason invitational champion Conference regular season champion Conference regular season and conference tournament champion Division regular season champion Division regular season and conference tournament champion Conference tournament champion
