= Sean Sutton =

American basketball player-coach

Biographical details
- Born: October 4, 1968 (age 58); Twin Falls, Idaho, U.S.

Playing career
- 1987–1989: Kentucky
- 1990–1992: Oklahoma State

Coaching career (HC unless noted)
- 1992–1993: Ole Miss (assistant)
- 1993–2006: Oklahoma State (assistant)
- 2006–2008: Oklahoma State
- 2011–2017: Oral Roberts (assistant)

Head coaching record
- Overall: 39–29
- Tournaments: 0–2 (NIT)

Sean Patrick Sutton (born October 4, 1968) is an American college basketball coach who last served as an advisor for Texas Tech. Sutton served as the head men's basketball coach Oklahoma State University–Stillwater from 2006 to 2008. As a college player and coach, Sutton has been part of over 400 victories, with 391 coming as a coach. As of April 2012, Sean has 39 wins as a head coach at Oklahoma State and 352 as an assistant coach at Mississippi, Oklahoma State and Oral Roberts. In 22 seasons, Sutton has played or coached in 23 NCAA Tournament victories. Oklahoma State advanced to the Final Four in 1995 and 2004 while Sutton was an assistant coach. Also, in 22 seasons as a player or coach, Sutton's teams have participated in postseason play 19 times.

Sean is one of three sons of college basketball coach Eddie Sutton. Sean's youngest brother Scott, formerly the men's basketball head coach at Oral Roberts University, is now an assistant coach at Oklahoma State.

== Playing career ==
Sutton was a two time letterwinner at the University of Kentucky before sitting out the 1989-90 season. In 1990, he enrolled at Oklahoma State University and was an instant starter for the Cowboys. As a point guard, he led Oklahoma State to back-to-back NCAA Sweet 16 appearances in 1991 and 1992. Sutton became the only player in OSU history to have advanced to three Sweet 16 appearances in his playing career with two trips as a Cowboy and one as a Wildcat.

During Sutton's two-year playing career at Oklahoma State, the Cowboys posted a 52-16 record and won a regular-season conference title. The Cowboys were ranked as high as No. 2 in the national polls during his senior season and won the Preseason NIT.

Sutton earned honorable mention All-Big Eight accolades as both a junior and a senior and made the All-District V team in 1992. Despite playing just two seasons at OSU, Sutton etched his name in the Cowboy record book several times. He is ranked 12th on the career assists list with 291 and first in career three-point percentage at 44.5 percent.

On the season listings, Sutton's 167 assists in 1992 rank seventh, while his 124 assists in 1991 are listed 19th. He averaged 10.2 points as a junior in 1990-91 and 11.7 points, second on the team behind only Byron Houston, as a senior. Sutton is the only player in OSU history to record at least 20 points and 10 assists in the same game; he tallied 21 points and 11 assists against Centenary on December 5, 1990.

== Coaching career ==
Sutton began his coaching career on the staff of Rob Evans at the University of Mississippi during the 1992-93 season. After that season, he returned to his alma mater as an assistant coach to replace Bill Self, who left to become the head coach at Oral Roberts University. In 1995, Oklahoma State reached the Final Four for the first time since 1951. Sean was named associate head coach at OSU on August 3, 2000. In April 2005, the OSU recruiting class was ranked the best in the country by Rivals.com. According to the website, "future Cowboy head coach Sean Sutton did his father proud this year by landing the nation's No. 1 player Gerald Green to go along with fellow five-star point guard Byron Eaton and Roderick Fleming."

Eddie Sutton was involved in a car accident on February 10, 2006. Oklahoma State announced on February 13, 2006, the 69-year-old Sutton would take medical leave following his DUI accident and that Sean will finish the remainder of the season as coach. On May 19, 2006, Eddie Sutton announced his retirement as head coach and designated his son, Sean, to become the official men's basketball head coach on June 30, 2006. Sean would coach the next two seasons, compiling 22–13 and 17–16 overall records, respectively, and losing in the first round of the NIT both seasons. On April 1, 2008, Sutton resigned under pressure as head coach of OSU with a record of 39-29. Athletic Director Mike Holder said Sean was a "victim of high expectations." Sean was two years into a five-year contract worth $750,000 a year that he had agreed to when he was still an assistant on his father's staff. It called for him to be the head coach-designate, meaning he would take over when his father left. A source told Doug Gottlieb that Sean would be paid for the remaining three years of the deal. Travis Ford, formerly the coach at UMass was hired as a replacement.

On October 7, 2010, Sutton was hired by Oral Roberts University as an advisor to his brother Scott Sutton in an unpaid capacity. In June 2011, he was promoted to assistant coach on his brother's staff. ORU men's basketball posted a 27-7 overall record and a 17-1 mark in the Summit League en route to winning a regular season conference championship during the 2011-12 campaign. The Golden Eagles advanced to the NIT.

== Personal ==
Sutton graduated from Oklahoma State with a degree in social studies in 1992. He and his wife, the former Trena Winters, have three sons: Hunter, Spencer and Sean Parker.

=== Battle with addiction ===
Sean Sutton was prescribed pain killers in early 2002 for migraines after the Oklahoma State plane crash in 2001. Over the next five or six years, Sutton was prescribed more medications to combat insomnia and lower back pain. Sutton was arrested on February 11, 2010, for trying to illegally obtain prescription painkillers. Sutton dates his sobriety from February 13, 2010 - two days after his arrest. He spent 115 days in a rehab facility and pleaded guilty to the charges in August 2010.

Sutton's record has since been expunged because he completed the requirements of his probation. He expressed "a strong passion to educate the youth of this state (Oklahoma) about the dangers of prescription medicine and where they can lead you in a short time." Today, he said, his real priorities are "the things that mean the most, and that's my faith, my relationship with my wife and kids (and extended family) ... and breaking the addiction cycle in my family." The drug case was dismissed in August 2011.

== Head coaching record ==
Record table
Season	Team	Overall	Conference	Standing	Postseason
Oklahoma State Cowboys (Big 12 Conference) (2006–2008)
2006–07	Oklahoma State	22–13	6–10	T–7th	NIT First Round
2007–08	Oklahoma State	17–16	7–9	T–7th	NIT First Round
Oklahoma State:		39–29 (.574)	13–19 (.406)		
Total:		39–29 (.574)			
