= Byron Houston =

American basketball player (born 1969)

Personal information
- Born: November 22, 1969 (age 56) Watonga, Oklahoma, U.S.
- Listed height: 6 ft 5 in (1.96 m)
- Listed weight: 250 lb (113 kg)

Career information
- High school: Star Spencer (Spencer, Oklahoma)
- College: Oklahoma State (1988–1992)
- NBA draft: 1992: 1st round, 27th overall pick
- Drafted by: Chicago Bulls
- Playing career: 1992–2001
- Position: Power forward
- Number: 21, 35

Career history
- 1992–1994: Golden State Warriors
- 1994–1995: Seattle SuperSonics
- 1995–1996: Sacramento Kings
- 1996–1997: León Caja España
- 1997–1998: Quad City Thunder
- 1998: VVS Samara
- 1998–1999: SSA Trefl Sopot
- 1999: Joventut Badalona
- 1999–2001: St. Louis Swarm

Career highlights
- CBA champion (1998); 2x IBL champion (2000, 2001); CBA Finals MVP (1998); Consensus second-team All-American (1992); Big Eight Player of the Year (1991); 3× First-team All-Big Eight (1990–1992)

Career NBA statistics
- Points: 835 (3.9 ppg)
- Rebounds: 648 (3.0 rpg)
- Stats at NBA.com
- Stats at Basketball Reference
Medals
Representing United States
Men's basketball
Pan American Games
Silver medal – second place	Winnipeg 1999	National team

Byron Dwight Houston (born November 22, 1969) is an American former professional basketball player. A 6'5", 250-pound power forward, he played collegiately for Oklahoma State University and was selected by the Chicago Bulls in the first round (27th pick overall) of the 1992 NBA draft. In an National Basketball Association (NBA) career that lasted four seasons, Houston played for the Golden State Warriors, Seattle SuperSonics and Sacramento Kings. He then played in the PBA in 1997. Houston played for the Quad City Thunder of the Continental Basketball Association (CBA) and was selected as the CBA Finals Most Valuable Player in 1998.

In Game 3 of a 1993-94 playoff series against the Phoenix Suns, Houston was one of the main assignments meant to guard Charles Barkley by coach Don Nelson. Nelson continued to not double team Barkley on his way to a 56-point performance believing Houston (among others) was strong enough to manage the matchup alone.

== Personal life ==
Houston's biological father is former NBA player Curtis Perry.

== Controversies ==
In June 2006, Houston was removed from a children's basketball camp in Oklahoma because he pleaded guilty in March 2003 to four counts of indecent exposure and was registered as a sex offender in that state for the next ten years. On June 13, 2007, Houston was arrested on counts of indecent exposure, engaging in a lewd act and driving with a canceled license. On September 16, 2007, he was sentenced to four years in prison for violating probation stemming from this offense. Defense witnesses have claimed that Houston has bipolar disorder and other conditions such as post-traumatic stress disorder as a result of suffering extreme abuse as a child.

== See also ==
- List of NCAA Division I men's basketball players with 2,000 points and 1,000 rebounds
- List of second-generation NBA players
