= Leroy Combs =

American basketball player (born 1961)

Personal information
- Born: January 1, 1961 (age 65) Oklahoma City, Oklahoma, U.S.
- Listed height: 6 ft 8 in (2.03 m)
- Listed weight: 210 lb (95 kg)

Career information
- High school: Star Spencer (Oklahoma City, Oklahoma)
- College: Oklahoma State (1979–1983)
- NBA draft: 1983: 2nd round, 26th overall pick
- Drafted by: Indiana Pacers
- Position: Small forward
- Number: 34

Career history
- 1983–1984: Indiana Pacers
- 1990: Gold Coast Cougars

Career highlights
- First-team All-Big Eight (1983)
- Stats at NBA.com
- Stats at Basketball Reference

Edwin Leroy Combs (born January 1, 1961, in Oklahoma City, Oklahoma) is an American former professional basketball player who was a small forward for one season in the National Basketball Association (NBA) as a member of the Indiana Pacers during the 1983–84 season. He was selected during the second round of the 1983 NBA draft by the Pacers.

In 1990, Combs played for the Gold Coast Cougars of the Australian National Basketball League.

== Career statistics ==
Legend
GP	Games played	GS	Games started	MPG	Minutes per game
FG%	Field goal percentage	3P%	3-point field goal percentage	FT%	Free throw percentage
RPG	Rebounds per game	APG	Assists per game	SPG	Steals per game
BPG	Blocks per game	PPG	Points per game	**Bold**	Career high

=== NBA ===
==== Regular season ====
Year	Team	GP	GS	MPG	FG%	3P%	FT%	RPG	APG	SPG	BPG	PPG
1983–84	Indiana	48	0	9.3	.497	.000	.615	1.2	.8	.5	.4	4.5
