= 1982–83 Notre Dame Fighting Irish men's basketball team =

NCAA Division I basketball team

1982–83 Notre Dame Fighting Irish men's basketball

NIT, First Round
- Conference: Independent
- Record: 19–10
- Head coach: Digger Phelps (12th season)
- Assistant coach: Pete Gillen (3rd season)
- Home arena: Joyce Center

1982–83 NCAA Division I men's basketball independents standings
	Conf.				Overall
Team	W		L	PCT	W		L	PCT
New Orleans		–		–	23	–	7	.767
Southwestern Louisiana		–		–	22	–	7	.759
South Carolina		–		–	22	–	9	.710
Stetson		–		–	19	–	9	.679
Southeastern Louisiana		–		–	18	–	9	.667
Marquette		–		–	19	–	10	.655
Notre Dame		–		–	19	–	10	.655
Dayton		–		–	18	–	10	.643
DePaul		–		–	21	–	12	.636
Baptist		–		–	13	–	14	.481
Utica		–		–	11	–	15	.423
Tennessee State		–		–	11	–	16	.407
UNC Wilmington		–		–	11	–	16	.407
Brooklyn		–		–	11	–	17	.393
Campbell		–		–	11	–	17	.393
UTSA		–		–	10	–	17	.370
Georgia State		–		–	9	–	19	.321
Texas–Pan American		–		–	7	–	21	.250
U.S. International		–		–	3	–	25	.107
Rankings from AP Poll

The 1982–83 Notre Dame Fighting Irish men's basketball team represented the University of Notre Dame during the 1982–83 NCAA Division I men's basketball season. The team was coached by Digger Phelps. The Fighting Irish finished the regular season with a record of 19–10.

== Roster ==
1982–83 Notre Dame Fighting Irish men's basketball team
Players
Coaches

Pos.	#	Name	Height	Weight	Year	Hometown
C	53	Tim Andree	6 ft 10 in (2.08 m)	230 lb (104 kg)	Sr	Farmington, Michigan
F/C	41	Tim Kempton	6 ft 10 in (2.08 m)	240 lb (109 kg)	Fr	Jamaica, New York
G	23	John Paxson	6 ft 2 in (1.88 m)	180 lb (82 kg)	Sr	Kettering, Ohio
		Joseph Price	6 ft 5 in (1.96 m)	200 lb (91 kg)	Fr	Marion, Indiana
G	33	Tom Sluby	6 ft 4 in (1.93 m)	200 lb (91 kg)	Jr	Washington, DC
F	34	Bill Varner	6 ft 6 in (1.98 m)	200 lb (91 kg)	Sr	New Kensington, Pennsylvania

Head coach

- Digger Phelps

Assistant coach(es)

Legend

- (C) Team captain
- (S) Suspended
- (I) Ineligible
- (W) Walk-on
- Injured
- Current redshirt

== Schedule ==
Date time, TV	Rank^{#}	Opponent^{#}	Result	Record	Site city, state
November 26		Stonehill	W 74–60	1–0	Joyce Center; Notre Dame, IN
November 27		Saint Francis (PA)	W 74–49	2–0	Joyce Center; Notre Dame, IN
December 1		vs. No. 3 Kentucky	L 45–58	2–1	Freedom Hall; Louisville, Kentucky
December 4		No. 6 UCLA	L 64–65	2–2	Joyce Center (11,345); Notre Dame, IN
December 7		No. 6 Indiana	L 52–68	2–3	Joyce Center; Notre Dame, IN
December 9		Fairfield	W 92–70	3–3	Joyce Center; Notre Dame, IN
December 11		Dartmouth	W 88–45	4–3	Joyce Center; Notre Dame, IN
December 22		Valparaiso	W 108–70	5–3	Joyce Center; Notre Dame, IN
December 30		William & Mary	W 83–60	6–3	Joyce Center; Notre Dame, IN
January 4		at Davidson	L 51–54 ^{OT}	6–4	Bojangles Coliseum; Charlotte, North Carolina
January 7		vs. No. 14 Villanova	L 55–61	6–5	Palestra; Philadelphia, Pennsylvania
January 12		Canisius	W 78–47	7–5	Joyce Center; Notre Dame, IN
January 15		at Marquette	W 59–57	8–5	MECCA Arena; Milwaukee, WI
January 17		Lafayette	W 51–40	9–5	Joyce Center; Notre Dame, IN
January 19		Bucknell	W 64–52	10–5	Joyce Center; Notre Dame, IN
January 22		at Maryland	L 67–68	10–6	Cole Field House; College Park, Maryland
January 30		at No. 1 UCLA	L 53–59	10–7	Pauley Pavilion (11,425); Los Angeles, CA
February 2		La Salle	W 68–56	11–7	Joyce Center; Notre Dame, IN
February 5		South Carolina	W 66–56	12–7	Joyce Center; Notre Dame, IN
February 10		vs. Fordham	L 69–75	12–8	Brendan Byrne Arena; East Rutherford, New Jersey
February 12		vs. NC State	W 43–42	13–8	Reynolds Coliseum; Raleigh, North Carolina
February 16		at Pittsburgh	W 60–54	14–8	Fitzgerald Field House; Pittsburgh, Pennsylvania
February 21		Akron	W 80–45	15–8	Joyce Center; Notre Dame, IN
February 22		Hofstra	W 61–50	16–8	Joyce Center; Notre Dame, IN
February 26		at DePaul	L 53–55	16–9	Rosemont Horizon; Rosemont, Illinois
March 3		Seton Hall	W 59–40	17–9	Joyce Center; Notre Dame, IN
March 5		Dayton	W 53–41	18–9	Joyce Center; Notre Dame, IN
March 10		Northern Iowa	W 75–51	19–9	Joyce Center; Notre Dame, IN
March 17		at Northwestern; NIT First round	L 57–71	19–10	Rosemont Horizon; Rosemont, Illinois
*Non-conference game. ^{#}Rankings from AP Poll. (#) Tournament seedings in parentheses. All times are in Eastern Time.

== Players selected in NBA drafts ==
Round	Pick	Player	NBA club
1	19	John Paxson	San Antonio Spurs
5	98	Tim Andree	Chicago Bulls
9	202	Bill Varner	Milwaukee Bucks
