= 1982–83 Michigan Wolverines men's basketball team =

American college basketball season

1982–83 Michigan Wolverines men's basketball
- Conference: Big Ten Conference
- Record: 15-13 (7–11 Big Ten)
- Head coach: Bill Frieder
- Assistant coaches: Steve Fisher; Mike Boyd; Bud VanDeWege
- MVP: Dion Harris

1982–83 Big Ten Conference men's basketball standings
	Conf.				Overall
Team	W		L	PCT	W		L	PCT
No. 5 Indiana	13	–	5	.722	24	–	6	.800
Purdue	11	–	7	.611	21	–	9	.700
Ohio State	11	–	7	.611	20	–	10	.667
Illinois	11	–	7	.611	21	–	11	.656
Iowa	10	–	8	.556	21	–	10	.677
Minnesota	9	–	9	.500	18	–	11	.621
Michigan State	9	–	9	.500	17	–	13	.567
Northwestern	7	–	11	.389	17	–	13	.567
Michigan	6	–	12	.333	15	–	13	.536
Wisconsin	3	–	15	.167	8	–	20	.286
Rankings from AP Poll

The 1982–83 Michigan Wolverines men's basketball team represented the University of Michigan in intercollegiate college basketball during the 1982–83 season. The team played its home games in the Crisler Arena in Ann Arbor, Michigan, and was a member of the Big Ten Conference. Under the direction of head coach Bill Frieder, the team finished ninth in the Big Ten Conference. The team failed to earn an invitation to either the 1983 National Invitation Tournament or the 1983 NCAA Men's Division I Basketball Tournament. The team was unranked for all eighteen weeks of Associated Press Top Twenty-Five Poll, and it also ended the season unranked in the final USA Today/CNN Poll.

== Schedule and results ==
Date time, TV	Rank^{#}	Opponent^{#}	Result	Record	Site city, state
Regular Season
November 27, 1982*		Akron	W 87–75	1–0	Crisler Arena; Ann Arbor, Michigan
December 1, 1982*		Central Michigan	W 71–66	2–0	Crisler Arena; Ann Arbor, Michigan
December 6, 1982*		Kansas	W 86–74	3–0	Crisler Arena; Ann Arbor, Michigan
December 8, 1982*		Cleveland State	W 95–72	4–0	Crisler Arena; Ann Arbor, Michigan
December 12, 1982*		at Detroit Mercy	W 65–63	5–0	Calihan Hall; Detroit, Michigan
December 20, 1982*		vs. Oklahoma State	L 70–78	5–1	Toledo, Ohio
December 21, 1982*		vs. Vermont	W 71–45	6–1	Toledo, Ohio
December 27, 1982*		Florida A&M	W 83–49	7–1	Crisler Arena; Ann Arbor, Michigan
December 30, 1982*		Penn	W 99–80	8–1	Crisler Arena; Ann Arbor, Michigan
January 6, 1983		at Northwestern	L 64–69	8–2 (0–1)	Welsh-Ryan Arena; Evanston, Illinois
January 8, 1983		at No. 8 Iowa	L 72–79	8–3 (0–2)	Carver-Hawkeye Arena; Iowa City, Iowa
January 12, 1983		Minnesota	W 63–58	9–3 (1–2)	Crisler Arena; Ann Arbor, Michigan
January 15, 1983		Wisconsin	W 62–57	10–3 (2–2)	Crisler Arena; Ann Arbor, Michigan
January 20, 1983		at Ohio State	L 68–75	10–4 (2–3)	St. John Arena; Columbus, Ohio
January 22, 1983		at No. 2 Indiana	L 76–93	10–5 (2–4)	Assembly Hall; Bloomington, Indiana
January 27, 1983		Purdue	L 77–80	10–6 (2–5)	Crisler Arena; Ann Arbor, Michigan
January 29, 1983		Illinois	L 74–87	10–7 (2–6)	Crisler Arena; Ann Arbor, Michigan
February 5, 1983		Michigan State	L 65–70	10–8 (2–7)	Crisler Arena; Ann Arbor, Michigan
February 12, 1983		at Michigan State	W 74–67	11–8 (3–7)	Jenison Fieldhouse; East Lansing, Michigan
February 17, 1983		at Illinois	L 71–91	11–9 (3–8)	Assembly Hall; Champaign, Illinois
February 19, 1983		at Purdue	L 68–71	11–10 (3–9)	Mackey Arena; West Lafayette, Indiana
February 24, 1983		No. 4 Indiana	W 69–56	12–10 (4–9)	Crisler Arena; Ann Arbor, Michigan
February 12, 1981		No. 15 Ohio State	L 71–81	12–11 (4–10)	Crisler Arena; Ann Arbor, Michigan
March 2, 1983		at Wisconsin	L 70–82	12–12 (4–11)	Wisconsin Field House; Madison, Wisconsin
March 5, 1983		at Minnesota	L 75–88	12–13 (4–12)	Williams Arena; Minneapolis, Minnesota
March 10, 1983		Iowa	W 66–60	13–13 (5–12)	Crisler Arena; Ann Arbor, Michigan
March 12, 1983		Northwestern	W 64–57	14–13 (6–12)	Crisler Arena; Ann Arbor, Michigan
*Non-conference game. ^{#}Rankings from AP poll. (#) Tournament seedings in parentheses. SE=Southeast.

== Team players drafted into the NBA ==
Eight players from this team were selected in the NBA draft.

Year	Round	Pick	Overall	Player	NBA Club
1983	10	7	213	Ike Person	Detroit Pistons
1984	1	12	12	Tim McCormick	Cleveland Cavaliers
1984	2	8	32	Eric Turner	Detroit Pistons
1984	10	19	225	Dan Pelekoudas	Detroit Pistons
1986	1	7	7	Roy Tarpley	Dallas Mavericks
1986	5	2	95	Richard Rellford	Indiana Pacers
1986	6	1	117	Butch Wade	New York Knicks
1986	7	5	144	Robert Henderson	Chicago Bulls
