= 1983 Southwest Conference men's basketball tournament =

- Classification: Division I
- Season: 1982–83
- Teams: 9
- Site: Reunion Arena; Dallas, Texas
- Champions: Houston (3rd title)
- Winning coach: Guy Lewis (3rd title)
- MVP: Michael Young (Houston)
- Television: NBC

1982–83 Southwest Conference men's basketball standings
	Conf.				Overall
Team	W		L	PCT	W		L	PCT
No. 1 Houston †	16	–	0	1.000	31	–	3	.912
No. 9 Arkansas	14	–	2	.875	26	–	4	.867
Texas A&M	10	–	6	.625	17	–	14	.548
TCU	9	–	7	.563	23	–	11	.676
SMU	9	–	7	.563	19	–	11	.633
Texas Tech	7	–	9	.438	11	–	20	.355
Baylor	4	–	12	.250	12	–	16	.429
Rice	2	–	14	.125	8	–	20	.286
Texas	1	–	15	.063	6	–	22	.214
† 1983 SWC tournament winner Rankings from AP poll

The 1983 Southwest Conference men's basketball tournament was held March 10–12 at Reunion Arena in Dallas, Texas. The first round took place March 7 at the higher seeded campus sites.

Number 1 seed Houston defeated 5 seed TCU 62-59 to win their 3rd championship and receive the conference's automatic bid to the 1983 NCAA tournament.

== Format and seeding ==
The tournament consisted of 9 teams in a single-elimination tournament. The 3 seed received a bye to the Quarterfinals and the 1 and 2 seed received a bye to the Semifinals.

Place	Seed	Team	Conference			Overall		
Place	Seed	Team	W	L	%	W	L	%
1	1	Houston	16	0	1.000	31	3	.912
2	2	Arkansas	14	2	.875	26	4	.867
3	3	Texas A&M	10	6	.625	17	14	.548
4	4	SMU	9	7	.563	19	11	.633
4	5	TCU	9	7	.563	23	11	.676
6	6	Texas Tech	7	9	.438	11	20	.355
7	7	Baylor	4	12	.250	12	16	.429
8	8	Rice	2	14	.125	8	20	.286
9	9	Texas	1	15	.063	6	22	.214

== Tournament ==
Date	Winner	Score	Loser	Notes
First Round
Mar 7	6 Texas Tech	57-55	7 Baylor	at Texas Tech
Mar 7	4 SMU	49-48	9 Texas	at SMU
Mar 7	5 TCU	74-49	8 Rice	at TCU
Quarterfinals
Mar 10	4 SMU	76-69	6 Texas Tech	
Mar 10	5 TCU	65-53	3 Texas A&M	
Semifinals
Mar 11	1 Houston	75-59	4 SMU	
Mar 11	5 TCU	61-59 (OT)	2 Arkansas	
Finals
Mar 12	1 Houston	62-59	5 TCU	
