= 1983 Metro Conference men's basketball tournament =

- Classification: Division I
- Season: 1982–83
- Teams: 7
- Site: Riverfront Coliseum; Cincinnati, OH
- Champions: Louisville (4th title)
- Winning coach: Denny Crum (4th title)
- MVP: Rodney McCray (Louisville)

1982–83 Metro Conference men's basketball standings
	Conf.				Overall
Team	W		L	PCT	W		L	PCT
No. 2 Louisville †	12	–	0	1.000	32	–	4	.889
Virginia Tech	7	–	5	.583	23	–	11	.676
Tulane	7	–	5	.583	19	–	12	.613
No. 17 Memphis State	6	–	6	.500	23	–	8	.742
Florida State	5	–	7	.417	14	–	14	.500
Southern Miss	3	–	9	.250	14	–	14	.500
Cincinnati	1	–	11	.083	11	–	17	.393
† 1983 Metro Conference tournament winner Rankings from AP Poll

The 1983 Metro Conference men's basketball tournament was held March 10–12 at Riverfront Coliseum in Cincinnati, Ohio.

Louisville defeated Tulane in the championship game, 66–51, to win their fourth Metro men's basketball tournament.

The Cardinals received an automatic bid to the 1983 NCAA Tournament, and would go on to reach the Final Four. Memphis State received an at-large bid.

== Format ==
All seven of the conference's members participated. They were seeded based on regular season conference records, with the top team earning a bye into the semifinal round. The other six teams entered into the preliminary first round.

This was the first tournament for Southern Miss, who joined the Metro Conference after playing as an Independent. They replaced Saint Louis, who departed for the Midwestern City Conference prior to the season.

== Bracket ==
Quarterfinals; Thursday, March 10
4	Memphis State	84
5	Florida State	74
3	Virginia Tech	79
6	Southern Miss	68
7	Cincinnati	65
2	Tulane	80

Semifinals; Friday, March 11
1	Louisville	71
4	Memphis State	68
3	Virginia Tech	73
2	Tulane	79

Championship; Saturday, March 12
1	Louisville	66
2	Tulane	51
