= 1982–83 Illinois Fighting Illini men's basketball team =

American college basketball season

1982–83 Illinois Fighting Illini men's basketball

Illini Classic, Champion

NCAA Men's Division I Tournament, First Round
- Conference: Big Ten Conference
- Record: 21–11 (11–7 Big Ten)
- Head coach: Lou Henson (8th season)
- Assistant coaches: Tony Yates (9th season); Dick Nagy (4th season); Bob Hull (3rd season)
- MVP: Derek Harper
- Captains: Kevin Bontemps; Derek Harper; Bryan Leonard
- Home arena: Assembly Hall

1982–83 Big Ten Conference men's basketball standings
	Conf.				Overall
Team	W		L	PCT	W		L	PCT
No. 5 Indiana	13	–	5	.722	24	–	6	.800
Purdue	11	–	7	.611	21	–	9	.700
Ohio State	11	–	7	.611	20	–	10	.667
Illinois	11	–	7	.611	21	–	11	.656
Iowa	10	–	8	.556	21	–	10	.677
Minnesota	9	–	9	.500	18	–	11	.621
Michigan State	9	–	9	.500	17	–	13	.567
Northwestern	7	–	11	.389	17	–	13	.567
Michigan	6	–	12	.333	15	–	13	.536
Wisconsin	3	–	15	.167	8	–	20	.286
Rankings from AP Poll

The 1982–83 Illinois Fighting Illini men's basketball team represented the University of Illiniois.

== Regular season ==
One of Illinois’ best groups arrived on campus for the 1982–83 season. Guards Bruce Douglas and Doug Altenberger, and forwards Scott Meents and Efrem Winters joined sophomores George Montgomery and Anthony Welch to form the nucleus for a team that would win 95 games during the next four seasons. During this season, the Fighting Illini became the nation's 25th team to cap the 1,000-win mark with a 72–70 victory over Texas A&M in the Great Alaska Shootout. Later that year, Derek Harper was selected First-Team All-Big Ten, falling one vote shy of being a unanimous pick, before leaving school early for the NBA draft. He was a first round selection of the Dallas Mavericks.

=== Roster ===
1982–83 Illinois Fighting Illini men's basketball team
Players
Coaches

Pos.	#	Name	Height	Weight	Year	Previous school	Hometown
G	11	Mike O'Brien	6 ft 2 in (1.88 m)	165 lb (75 kg)	Jr	Richwoods High School	Peoria, Illinois
G	12	Derek Harper (C)	6 ft 4 in (1.93 m)	185 lb (84 kg)	Jr	North Shore High School	West Palm Beach, Florida
G	20	Kevin Bontemps (C)	6 ft 2 in (1.88 m)	180 lb (82 kg)	Sr	Morton High School	Morton, Illinois
G	21	Quinn Richardson (injured) (redshirt)	5 ft 11 in (1.8 m)	175 lb (79 kg)	Sr	Eisenhower High School	Robbins, Illinois
G	22	Doug Altenberger	6 ft 4 in (1.93 m)	180 lb (82 kg)	Fr	Richwoods High School	Peoria, Illinois
F	23	George Montgomery	6 ft 8 in (2.03 m)	215 lb (98 kg)	So	Corliss High School	Chicago, Illinois
F	24	Efrem Winters	6 ft 9 in (2.06 m)	210 lb (95 kg)	Fr	King High School	Chicago, Illinois
G	25	Bruce Douglas	6 ft 3 in (1.91 m)	175 lb (79 kg)	Fr	Quincy Senior High School	Quincy, Illinois
F/C	30	Scott Meents	6 ft 9 in (2.06 m)	230 lb (104 kg)	Fr	Herscher High School	Kankakee, Illinois
F	31	Don Klusendorf	6 ft 6 in (1.98 m)	210 lb (95 kg)	Jr	Lyons Township High School	Western Springs, Illinois
F	32	Jay Daniels	6 ft 7 in (2.01 m)	185 lb (84 kg)	So	John I. Leonard High School	West Palm Beach, Florida
F	34	Dee Maras	6 ft 7 in (2.01 m)	225 lb (102 kg)	So	Antioch Community High School	Antioch, Illinois
G	35	Reggie Woodward	6 ft 2 in (1.88 m)	170 lb (77 kg)	Fr	King High School	Chicago, Illinois
F	43	Bryan Leonard (C)	6 ft 10 in (2.08 m)	230 lb (104 kg)	RS Sr	Belleville High School-East	Belleville, Illinois
F	44	Anthony Welch	6 ft 9 in (2.06 m)	180 lb (82 kg)	So	Creston High School	Grand Rapids, Michigan

Head coach

- Lou Henson (New Mexico State University) (8th year)

Assistant coach(es)

- Tony Yates (University of Cincinnati) (9th year)
- Dick Nagy (Hardin-Simmons University) (4th year)
- Bob Hull (3rd year)

Legend

- (C) Team captain
- (S) Suspended
- (I) Ineligible
- (W) Walk-on
- Injured
- Current redshirt

Roster

== Schedule and results ==
Date time, TV	Rank^{#}	Opponent^{#}	Result	Record	Site (attendance) city, state
Non-Conference regular season
11/26/1982*		vs. Vanderbilt; Great Alaska Shootout	L 47–58	0–1	Buckner Fieldhouse (3,500); Anchorage, AK
11/27/1982*		vs. Texas A&M; Great Alaska Shootout	W 72–70	1–1	Buckner Fieldhouse (3,500); Anchorage, AK
11/28/1982*		vs. Florida; Great Alaska Shootout	W 68–55	2–1	Buckner Fieldhouse (2,500); Anchorage, AK
12/2/1982*		Valparaiso	W 94–59	3–1	Assembly Hall (11,184); Champaign, IL
12/4/1982*		Western Michigan	W 75–59	4–1	Assembly Hall (12,874); Champaign, IL
12/19/1982*		at Kansas State	W 59–55	5–1	Ahearn Field House (11,220); Manhattan, KS
12/11/1982*		at No. 2 Kentucky	L 57–76	5–2	Rupp Arena (23,872); Lexington, KY
12/13/1982*		Vanderbilt	W 79–77 ^{2ot}	6–2	Assembly Hall (10,341); Champaign
12/17/1982*		Southern Illinois; Illini Classic	W 79–61	7–2	Assembly Hall (10,119); Champaign
12/18/1982*		Illinois State; Illini Classic	W 67–60	8–2	Assembly Hall (14,328); Champaign, IL
12/23/1982*		at Oklahoma	L 75–101	8–3	Lloyd Noble Center (8,713); Norman, OK
12/31/1982*		Loyola (Chicago)	W 73–72	9–3	Assembly Hall (10,152); Champaign, IL
1/3/1982*		vs. Iowa State	W 74–57	10–3	Rosemont Horizon (7,628); Rosemont, IL
Big Ten regular season
1/6/1983		at Minnesota	L 49–75	10–4 (0–1)	Williams Arena (15,543); Minneapolis, MN
1/8/1983		at Wisconsin	W 61–54	11–4 (1–1)	Wisconsin Field House (7,401); Madison, WI
1/13/1983		No. 4 Indiana; Rivalry	L 55–69	11–5 (1–2)	Assembly Hall (14,827); Champaign, IL
1/5/1983		No. 20 Ohio State	W 63–55	12–5 (2–2)	Assembly Hall (13,015); Champaign, IL
1/19/1983		at Purdue	L 62–63	12–6 (2–3)	Mackey Arena (13,502); West Lafayette, IN
1/27/1983		at Michigan State	W 78–71	13–6 (3–3)	Jenison Fieldhouse (7,018); East Lansing, MI
1/29/1983		at Michigan	W 87–74	14–6 (4–3)	Crisler Arena (12,876); Ann Arbor, MI
2/3/1983		No. 13 Iowa; Rivalry	W 62–61	15–6 (5–3)	Assembly Hall (15,181); Champaign, IL
2/5/1983		Northwestern; Rivalry	W 78–62	16–6 (6–3)	Assembly Hall (14,684); Champaign, IL
2/10/1983		at Northwestern; Rivalry	L 55–58	16–7 (6–4)	Alumni Hall (5,223); Chicago, IL
2/12/1983		at No. 20 Iowa; Rivalry	L 66–68	16–8 (6–5)	Carver–Hawkeye Arena (15,450); Iowa City, IA
2/17/1983		Michigan	W 91–71	17–8 (7–5)	Assembly Hall (12,716); Champaign, IL
2/19/1983		Michigan State	W 69–61	18–8 (8–5)	Assembly Hall (14,123); Champaign, IL
2/23/1983		Purdue	L 54–56	18–9 (8–6)	Assembly Hall (13,507); Champaign, IL
2/27/1983		at No. 14 Ohio State	W 74–73	19–9 (9–6)	St. John Arena (11,979); Columbus, OH
3/5/1983		at No. 11 Indiana; Rivalry	L 55–67	19–10 (9–7)	Assembly Hall (17,328); Bloomington, IN
3/10/1983		Wisconsin	W 71–64	20–10 (10–7)	Assembly Hall (12,947); Champaign, IL
3/13/1983		Minnesota	W 70–67 ^{2ot}	21–10 (11–7)	Assembly Hall (15,386); Champaign, IL
NCAA Tournament
3/17/1983*	(7 W)	vs. (10 W) Utah; First Round	L 49–52	21–11	BSU Pavilion (11,200); Boise, ID
*Non-conference game. ^{#}Rankings from AP Poll. (#) Tournament seedings in parentheses. All times are in Central Time.

== Player stats ==
Player	Games played	Minutes played	2 pt. Field Goals	3 pt. Field Goals	Free throws	Rebounds	Assists	Blocks	Steals	Points
Derek Harper	32	1182	185	13	83	112	118	18	72	792
Efrem Winters	31	977	159	0	67	213	20	31	14	385
Anthony Welch	32	1085	158	0	61	201	44	15	17	377
Bruce Douglas	32	1016	117	1	64	87	189	5	78	301
George Montgomery	32	643	72	0	40	146	22	7	15	184
Bryan Leonard	30	495	51	0	20	104	22	9	10	122
Doug Altenberger	31	428	29	1	35	40	23	0	15	96
Scott Meents	29	237	34	0	13	35	27	14	6	81
Jay Daniels	18	250	28	0	15	29	11	2	9	71
Kevin Bontemps	27	138	8	0	14	20	27	0	1	30
Reggie Woodward	14	29	5	1	3	5	4	0	2	16
Don Klusendorf	13	21	2	0	5	6	0	0	0	9
Dee Maras	12	24	2	0	0	9	1	0	1	4

== Awards and honors ==
- Derek Harper
  - Associated Press 2nd team All-American
  - Fighting Illini All-Century team (2005)
  - Team Most Valuable Player
- Bruce Douglas
  - Fighting Illini All-Century team (2005)

== Team players drafted into the NBA ==
Player	NBA club	Round	Pick
Derek Harper	Dallas Mavericks	1	11
