= 1982–83 Marquette Warriors men's basketball team =

American college basketball season

1982–83 Marquette Warriors men's basketball

NCAA tournament, First Round, L 56–57 vs. Tennessee
- Conference: Independent
- Record: 19–10
- Head coach: Hank Raymonds (6th season)
- Captains: Doc Rivers; Terrell Schlundt

1982–83 NCAA Division I men's basketball independents standings
	Conf.				Overall
Team	W		L	PCT	W		L	PCT
New Orleans		–		–	23	–	7	.767
Southwestern Louisiana		–		–	22	–	7	.759
South Carolina		–		–	22	–	9	.710
Stetson		–		–	19	–	9	.679
Southeastern Louisiana		–		–	18	–	9	.667
Marquette		–		–	19	–	10	.655
Notre Dame		–		–	19	–	10	.655
Dayton		–		–	18	–	10	.643
DePaul		–		–	21	–	12	.636
Baptist		–		–	13	–	14	.481
Utica		–		–	11	–	15	.423
Tennessee State		–		–	11	–	16	.407
UNC Wilmington		–		–	11	–	16	.407
Brooklyn		–		–	11	–	17	.393
Campbell		–		–	11	–	17	.393
UTSA		–		–	10	–	17	.370
Georgia State		–		–	9	–	19	.321
Texas–Pan American		–		–	7	–	21	.250
U.S. International		–		–	3	–	25	.107
Rankings from AP Poll

The 1982–83 Marquette Warriors men's basketball team represented Marquette University during the 1982–83 college basketball season.

== Roster ==
1982–83 Marquette Warriors men's basketball team
Players
Coaches

Pos.	#	Name	Height	Weight	Year	Hometown
G	20	Mandy Johnson	6 ft 0 in (1.83 m)	175 lb (79 kg)	So	Jersey City, NJ
F	52	Marc Marotta	6 ft 7 in (2.01 m)	210 lb (95 kg)	Jr	Pittsburgh, Pennsylvania
G	31	Doc Rivers	6 ft 4 in (1.93 m)	185 lb (84 kg)	Jr	Maywood, Illinois
F	33	Terrell Schlundt	6 ft 7 in (2.01 m)	205 lb (93 kg)	Sr	Antigo, Wisconsin

Head coach

- Hank Raymonds

Assistant coach(es)

Legend

- (C) Team captain
- (S) Suspended
- (I) Ineligible
- (W) Walk-on
- Injured
- Current redshirt

== Schedule ==
Date time, TV	Rank^{#}	Opponent^{#}	Result	Record	Site (attendance) city, state
Regular season
December 1	No. 17	Florida A&M	W 91–58	1–0	MECCA Arena; Milwaukee, WI
December 4	No. 17	Texas A&M	W 73–58	2–0	MECCA Arena; Milwaukee, WI
December 8	No. 16	at No. 7 Iowa	L 66–87	2–1	Iowa Field House (13,365); Iowa City, IA
December 11	No. 16	Northern Illinois	W 66–56	3–1	MECCA Arena; Milwaukee, WI
December 18		Marshall	W 79–72	4–1	MECCA Arena; Milwaukee, WI
December 20		at Minnesota	L 66–100	4–2	Minneapolis, MN
December 22		Kansas State	W 61–51	6–2	MECCA Arena; Milwaukee, WI
December 27		Wisconsin-Green Bay; Milwaukee Classic	W 57–47	6–2	Milwaukee, WI
December 28		Cincinnati; Milwaukee Classic	W 69–52	7–2	Milwaukee, WI
January 2		at Creighton	W 64–52	8–2	Omaha, NE
January 4		at Arizona State	W 71–65	9–2	Tempe, AZ
January 8		Xavier (OH)	W 72–64	10–2	MECCA Arena; Milwaukee, WI
January 11		Iona	W 85–78	11–2	MECCA Arena; Milwaukee, WI
January 15		Notre Dame	L 57–59	11–3	MECCA Arena; Milwaukee, WI
January 18		Tennessee Tech	W 78–59	12–3	MECCA Arena; Milwaukee, WI
January 23		at No. 12 Missouri	W 60–59 ^{OT}	13–3	Hearnes Center; Columbia, MO
January 25		at Duquesne	W 72–53	14–3	Pittsburgh, PA
January 29		at Virginia Tech	L 68–72	14–4	Blacksburg, VA
February 6		at Wake Forest	L 65–78	14–5	Winston-Salem, NC
February 8		Old Dominion	W 53–50	15–5	MECCA Arena; Milwaukee, WI
February 12		No. 11 Louisville	L 73–81	15–6	MECCA Arena; Milwaukee, WI
February 15		Loyola (IL)	W 97–85	16–6	MECCA Arena; Milwaukee, WI
February 17		at Wisconsin	W 68–62	17–6	UW Fieldhouse; Madison, WI
February 23		at Dayton	L 63–65	17–7	Dayton, OH
February 27		at South Carolina	L 64–66	17–8	Columbia, SC
March 1		Stetson	W 69–66 ^{OT}	18–8	MECCA Arena; Milwaukee, WI
March 6		at DePaul	L 62–74	18–9	Rosemont, IL
March 12		Louisiana-Lafayette	W 85–64	19–9	MECCA Arena; Milwaukee, WI
NCAA tournament
March 18	(9 ME)	vs. (8 ME) Tennessee; NCAA tournament • First Round	L 56–57	19–10	Roberts Municipal Stadium; Evansville, IN
*Non-conference game. ^{#}Rankings from AP poll. (#) Tournament seedings in parentheses. All times are in Central Time.
