= 1982–83 Michigan State Spartans men's basketball team =

American college basketball season

1982–83 Michigan State Spartans men's basketball

Spartan Cutlass Classic champions
- Conference: Big Ten Conference
- Record: 17–13 (9–9 Big Ten)
- Head coach: Jud Heathcote (7th season)
- Assistant coaches: Frank Rourke; Mike Deane; William Norton
- Captains: Bill Cawood; Derek Perry
- Home arena: Jenison Fieldhouse

1982–83 Big Ten Conference men's basketball standings
	Conf.				Overall
Team	W		L	PCT	W		L	PCT
No. 5 Indiana	13	–	5	.722	24	–	6	.800
Purdue	11	–	7	.611	21	–	9	.700
Ohio State	11	–	7	.611	20	–	10	.667
Illinois	11	–	7	.611	21	–	11	.656
Iowa	10	–	8	.556	21	–	10	.677
Minnesota	9	–	9	.500	18	–	11	.621
Michigan State	9	–	9	.500	17	–	13	.567
Northwestern	7	–	11	.389	17	–	13	.567
Michigan	6	–	12	.333	15	–	13	.536
Wisconsin	3	–	15	.167	8	–	20	.286
Rankings from AP Poll

The 1982–83 Michigan State Spartans men's basketball team represented Michigan State University in the 1982–83 NCAA Division I men's basketball season. The team played their home games at Jenison Field House in East Lansing, Michigan and were members of the Big Ten Conference. They were coached by Jud Heathcote in his seventh year at Michigan State. The Spartans finished with a record of 17–13, 9–9 to finish in a tie for sixth place in Big Ten play. The Spartans received an invitation to the National Invitation Tournament where they defeated Bowling Green State before losing to Fresno State.

== Previous season ==
The Spartans finished the 1981–82 season with a record of 11–17, 6–12 to finish in a tie for seventh place.

== Roster and statistics ==
1982–83 Michigan State Spartans men's basketball team
No	Name	Pos	Year	Height	Pts	Reb	Ast
10	Tim Gore	G	JR	6–4	0.3	0.2	0.2
11	Sam Vincent	G	SO	6–2	16.6	2.6	4.9
14	Matt Carrington	G	SO	6–1	0.3	0.1	0.3
15	Ralph Walker	F	FR	6–8	1.3	0.5	0.3
20	Ben Tower	F	JR	6–7	5.9	4.7	1.7
22	Bill Cawood	G/F	SR	6–7	1.2	0.7	0.3
24	Richard Mudd	F/C	JR	6–9	2.5	2.5	0.1
25	Scott Skiles	G	FR	6–1	12.5	2.1	4.9
35	Larry Polec	F	SO	6–8	4.5	2.8	1.4
40	Paul Horton	C	SO	6–9	–	–	–
41	Derek Perry	F	SR	6–6	9.1	3.9	0.8
42	Kevin Willis	C	JR	7–0	13.3	9.6	0.3
44	Patrick Ford	G/F	FR	6–5	4.7	1.7	1.0
45	Sterling William	F	JR	6–6	–	–	–

== Schedule and results ==
Date time, TV	Rank^{#}	Opponent^{#}	Result	Record	Site city, state
Non-conference regular season
Nov 26, 1982*		Western Michigan; Spartan Cutlass Classic semifinals	W 72–65	1–0	Jenison Field House; East Lansing, MI
Nov 27, 1982*		Central Michigan; Spartan Cutlass Classic championship	W 62–47	2–0	Jenison Field House; East Lansing, MI
Nov 29, 1982*		at Boise State	W 71–58	3–0	Taco Bell Arena; Boise, ID
Dec 4, 1982*		BYU	W 63–55	4–0	Jenison Field House; East Lansing, MI
Dec 11, 1982*		No. 18 NC State	L 41–45	4–1	Reynolds Coliseum; Raleigh, NC
Dec 13, 1982*		at Cincinnati	W 78–69	5–1	Riverfront Coliseum; Cincinnati, OH
Dec 18, 1982*		Detroit Mercy	W 75–72	6–1	Jenison Field House; East Lansing, MI
Dec 21, 1982*		Cleveland State	W 95–56	7–1	Jenison Field House; East Lansing, MI
Dec 28, 1982*		vs. Southwestern Louisiana; Sugar Bowl Tournament semifinals	L 66–71	7–2	Avron B. Fogelman Arena; New Orleans, LA
Dec 29, 1982*		at Tulane; Sugar Bowl Tournament third place game	L 58–81	7–3	Avron B. Fogelman Arena; New Orleans, LA
Big Ten regular season
Jan 5, 1983		at No. 8 Iowa	W 61–59	8–3 (1–0)	Iowa Field House; Iowa City, IA
Jan 8, 1983		at Northwestern	L 51–62	8–4 (1–1)	Alumni Hall; Evanston, IL
Jan 13, 1983		Wisconsin	W 86–66	9–4 (2–1)	Jenison Field House; East Lansing, MI
Jan 15, 1983		No. 17 Minnesota	L 67–69	9–5 (2–2)	Jenison Field House; East Lansing, MI
Jan 20, 1983		at No. 2 Indiana	L 85–89	9–6 (2–3)	Assembly Hall; Bloomington, IN
Jan 22, 1983		at Ohio State	L 69–74	9–7 (2–4)	St. John Arena; Columbus, OH
Jan 27, 1983		Illinois	L 71–78	9–8 (2–5)	Jenison Field House; East Lansing, MI
Jan 29, 1983		Purdue	W 83–67	10–8 (3–5)	Jenison Field House; East Lansing, MI
Feb 5, 1983		at Michigan; Rivalry	W 70–65	11–8 (4–5)	Crisler Arena; Ann Arbor, MI
Feb 12, 1983		Michigan; Rivalry	L 67–74	11–9 (4–6)	Jenison Field House; East Lansing, MI
Feb 17, 1983		at Purdue	L 55–61	11–10 (4–7)	Mackey Arena; West Lafayette, IN
Feb 19, 1983		at Illinois	L 61–69	11–11 (4–8)	Assembly Hall; Champaign, IL
Feb 24, 1983		No. 15 Ohio State	W 101–94	12–11 (5–8)	Jenison Field House; East Lansing, MI
Feb 26, 1983		No. 4 Indiana	W 62–54	13–11 (6–8)	Jenison Field House; East Lansing, MI
Mar 3, 1983		at Minnesota	W 79–67	14–11 (7–8)	Williams Arena; Minneapolis, MN
Mar 5, 1983		at Wisconsin	W 91–65	15–11 (8–8)	Wisconsin Field House; Madison, WI
Mar 9, 1983		Northwestern	W 63–58	16–11 (9–8)	Jenison Field House; East Lansing, MI
Mar 12, 1983		Iowa	L 57–75	16–12 (9–9)	Jenison Field House; East Lansing, MI
NIT
Mar 18, 1983		Bowling Green State first round	W 72–71	17–12	Jenison Field House; East Lansing, MI
Mar 21, 1983		Fresno State first round	L 58–72	17–13	Jenison Field House; East Lansing, MI
*Non-conference game. ^{#}Rankings from AP Poll,. (#) Tournament seedings in parentheses. All times are in Central Time Source.
