= 1982–83 Wisconsin Badgers men's basketball team =

American college basketball season

1982–83 Wisconsin Badgers men's basketball
- Conference: Big Ten Conference
- Record: 8–20 (3–15 Big Ten)
- Head coach: Steve Yoder
- Home arena: UW Fieldhouse

1982–83 Big Ten Conference men's basketball standings
	Conf.				Overall
Team	W		L	PCT	W		L	PCT
No. 5 Indiana	13	–	5	.722	24	–	6	.800
Purdue	11	–	7	.611	21	–	9	.700
Ohio State	11	–	7	.611	20	–	10	.667
Illinois	11	–	7	.611	21	–	11	.656
Iowa	10	–	8	.556	21	–	10	.677
Minnesota	9	–	9	.500	18	–	11	.621
Michigan State	9	–	9	.500	17	–	13	.567
Northwestern	7	–	11	.389	17	–	13	.567
Michigan	6	–	12	.333	15	–	13	.536
Wisconsin	3	–	15	.167	8	–	20	.286
Rankings from AP Poll

The 1982–83 Wisconsin Badgers men's basketball team represented University of Wisconsin–Madison. The head coach was Steve Yoder, coaching his first season with the Badgers. The team played their home games at the UW Fieldhouse in Madison, Wisconsin and was a member of the Big Ten Conference.

== Roster ==
1982–83 Wisconsin Badgers men's basketball team
Players
Coaches

Pos.	#	Name	Height	Weight	Year	Hometown
G	10	Greg Dandridge	6 ft 2 in (1.88 m)	175 lb (79 kg)	Sr	Milwaukee, Wisconsin
G	12	Rick Olson	6 ft 1 in (1.85 m)	165 lb (75 kg)	Fr	Madison, Wisconsin
F	30	Cory Blackwell	6 ft 6 in (1.98 m)	215 lb (98 kg)	So	Chicago, Illinois
F	31	Scott Roth	6 ft 7 in (2.01 m)	200 lb (91 kg)	So	Brecksville, Ohio
F	32	Brad Sellers	6 ft 11 in (2.11 m)	210 lb (95 kg)	So	Warrensville Heights, Ohio
G	33	David Miller	6 ft 4 in (1.93 m)	180 lb (82 kg)	Fr	Chicago, Illinois
F	34	Jim Smith	6 ft 6 in (1.98 m)	170 lb (77 kg)	Fr	Toledo, Ohio
F	43	Randy Maerz	6 ft 7 in (2.01 m)	180 lb (82 kg)	Fr	Stoughton, Wisconsin
C	44	John Ploss	6 ft 9 in (2.06 m)	220 lb (100 kg)	So	Antioch, Illinois
F	45	Jay Laszewski	6 ft 8 in (2.03 m)	190 lb (86 kg)	Fr	Stevens Point, Wisconsin
F	50	Gregg Steinhaus	6 ft 8 in (2.03 m)	185 lb (84 kg)	Fr	Portage, Wisconsin
F	51	Jack Hippen	6 ft 7 in (2.01 m)	205 lb (93 kg)	So	Chadwick, Illinois

Head coach

- Steve Yoder (Illinois Wesleyan)

Assistant coach(es)

- Rick Bowen (Indiana)
- Brad McNulty (Purdue)
- Bo Ryan (Wilkes)

Legend

- (C) Team captain
- (S) Suspended
- (I) Ineligible
- (W) Walk-on
- Injured
- Current redshirt

== Schedule ==
Date time, TV	Rank^{#}	Opponent^{#}	Result	Record	Site city, state
Regular Season
11/27/1982*		Washington State	L 64–66	0–1	UW Fieldhouse; Madison, WI
11/29/1982*		Toledo	W 79–71	1–1	UW Fieldhouse; Madison, WI
12/1/1982*		Northern Iowa	W 76–69	2–1	UW Fieldhouse; Madison, WI
12/4/1982*		Kansas State	W 64–52	3–1	UW Fieldhouse; Madison, WI
12/8/1982*		at Ball State	L 66–76	3–2	Irving Gymnasium; Muncie, IN
12/11/1982*		Central Michigan	W 83–67	4–2	UW Fieldhouse; Madison, WI
12/20/1982*		vs. Northern Illinois	W 58–55	5–2	MetroCentre; Rockford, IL
12/28/1982*		vs. No. 10 Georgetown; Winston Tire Classic	L 43–71	5–3	Los Angeles Memorial Sports Arena; Los Angeles, CA
12/29/1982*		vs. USC; Winston Tire Classic	L 76–86	5–4	Los Angeles Memorial Sports Arena; Los Angeles, CA
1/6/1982		No. 20 Purdue	L 64–80	5–5 (0–1)	UW Fieldhouse; Madison, WI
1/8/1983		Illinois	L 54–61	5–6 (0–2)	UW Fieldhouse; Madison, WI
1/13/1983		at Michigan State	L 66–86	5–7 (0–3)	Breslin Center; East Lansing, MI
1/15/1983		at Michigan	L 57–62	5–8 (0–4)	Crisler Arena; Ann Arbor, MI
1/20/1983		Northwestern	W 49–45	6–8 (1–4)	UW Fieldhouse; Madison, WI
1/22/1983		No. 10 Iowa	W 65–62	7–8 (2–4)	UW Fieldhouse; Madison, WI
1/29/1983		No. 16 Minnesota	L 58–65	7–9 (2–5)	UW Fieldhouse; Madison, WI
2/3/1983		at No. 6 Indiana	L 73–83	7–10 (2–6)	Assembly Hall; Bloomington, IN
2/5/1983		at Ohio State	L 69–82	7–11 (2–7)	St. John Arena; Columbus, OH
2/9/1983		Ohio State	L 65–68	7–12 (2–8)	UW Fieldhouse; Madison, WI
2/12/1983		No. 4 Indiana	L 56–75	7–13 (2–9)	UW Fieldhouse; Madison, WI
2/17/1983*		Marquette	L 62–68	7–14	UW Fieldhouse; Madison, WI
2/19/1983		at Minnesota	L 71–78	7–15 (2–10)	Williams Arena; Minneapolis, MN
2/24/1983		at No. 17 Iowa	L 63–93	7–16 (2–11)	Carver–Hawkeye Arena; Iowa City, IA
2/26/1983		vs. Northwestern	L 57–64	7–17 (2–12)	Alumni Hall; Chicago, IL
3/2/1983		Michigan	W 82–70	8–17 (3–12)	UW Fieldhouse; Madison, WI
3/5/1983		Michigan State	L 65–91	8–18 (3–13)	UW Fieldhouse; Madison, WI
3/10/1983		at Illinois	L 64–71	8–19 (3–14)	Assembly Hall; Champaign, IL
3/12/1983		at Purdue	L 64–79	8–20 (3–15)	Mackey Arena; West Lafayette, IN
*Non-conference game. ^{#}Rankings from AP Poll. (#) Tournament seedings in parentheses.
