= 1982–83 Arkansas Razorbacks men's basketball team =

American college basketball season

1982–83 Arkansas Razorbacks men's basketball

NCAA tournament, Sweet Sixteen
- Conference: Southwest Conference

Ranking
- Coaches: No. 9
- AP: No. 9
- Record: 26–4 (14–2 SWC)
- Head coach: Eddie Sutton (9th season)
- Assistant coaches: Bill Brown (3rd season); Doc Sadler (1st season)
- Home arena: Barnhill Arena

1982–83 Southwest Conference men's basketball standings
	Conf.				Overall
Team	W		L	PCT	W		L	PCT
No. 1 Houston †	16	–	0	1.000	31	–	3	.912
No. 9 Arkansas	14	–	2	.875	26	–	4	.867
Texas A&M	10	–	6	.625	17	–	14	.548
TCU	9	–	7	.563	23	–	11	.676
SMU	9	–	7	.563	19	–	11	.633
Texas Tech	7	–	9	.438	11	–	20	.355
Baylor	4	–	12	.250	12	–	16	.429
Rice	2	–	14	.125	8	–	20	.286
Texas	1	–	15	.063	6	–	22	.214
† 1983 SWC tournament winner Rankings from AP poll

The 1982–83 Arkansas Razorbacks men's basketball team represented the University of Arkansas during the 1982–83 NCAA Division I men's basketball season. The head coach was Eddie Sutton, serving for his ninth year. The team played its home games in Barnhill Arena in Fayetteville, Arkansas. This team finished second in the SWC regular season standings, and lost in the semifinals of the conference tournament. In the 1983 NCAA Tournament, the Hogs defeated Purdue before losing to No. 1 seed Louisville in the Mideast regional semifinal.

== Roster ==
1982–83 Arkansas Razorbacks men's basketball team
Players
Coaches

Pos.	#	Name	Height	Weight	Year	Previous school	Hometown
G	20	Darrell Walker	6 ft 4 in (1.93 m)	180 lb (82 kg)	Sr	Arkansas–Fort Smith	Chicago, Illinois
G	21	Alvin Robertson	6 ft 4 in (1.93 m)	200 lb (91 kg)	Jr	Crowder College	Barberton, Ohio
C	35	Joe Kleine	6 ft 11 in (2.11 m)	250 lb (113 kg)	So	Notre Dame	Slater, Missouri

Head coach

- Eddie Sutton

Assistant coach(es)

- Bill Brown
- Doc Sadler

Legend

- (C) Team captain
- (S) Suspended
- (I) Ineligible
- (W) Walk-on
- Injured
- Current redshirt

== Schedule and results ==
Date time, TV	Rank^{#}	Opponent^{#}	Result	Record	Site (attendance) city, state
Regular season
Nov 27, 1982*	No. 17	Southeast Missouri State	W 74–57	1–0	Barnhill Arena; Fayetteville, Arkansas
Dec 1, 1982*	No. 16	Texas-San Antonio	W 78–59	2–0	Barnhill Arena; Fayetteville, Arkansas
Dec 4, 1982*	No. 16	at Centenary	W 79–51	3–0	Gold Dome; Shreveport, Louisiana
Dec 6, 1982*	No. 13	vs. SW Missouri State	W 87–66	4–0	Barton Coliseum (7,690); Little Rock, Arkansas
Dec 15, 1982*	No. 13	Alabama State	W 108–65	4–0	Barnhill Arena; Fayetteville, Arkansas
Dec 18, 1982*	No. 13	Louisiana-Monroe	W 89–76	6–0	Barnhill Arena; Fayetteville, Arkansas
Dec 21, 1982*	No. 12	vs. Southern Miss	W 64–62	7–0	Pine Bluff Convention Center (7,041); Pine Bluff, Arkansas
Dec 28, 1982*	No. 11	vs. Saint Peter's	W 52–48	8–0	(8,871); Jersey City, New Jersey
Jan 3, 1983*	No. 11	vs. Nebraska	W 64–58	9–0	Barton Coliseum (7,920); Little Rock, Arkansas
Jan 5, 1983*	No. 10	vs. Mercer	W 83–62	10–0	Pine Bluff Convention Center (7,140); Pine Bluff, Arkansas
Jan 8, 1983	No. 10	Baylor	W 65–60	11–0 (1–0)	Barnhill Arena; Fayetteville, Arkansas
Jan 13, 1983	No. 7	at Texas A&M	W 66–64	12–0 (2–0)	G. Rollie White Coliseum; College Station, Texas
Jan 15, 1983	No. 7	at SMU	W 63–56	13–0 (3–0)	Moody Coliseum; Dallas, Texas
Jan 19, 1983	No. 4	at TCU	W 69–55	14–0 (4–0)	Daniel-Meyer Coliseum; Fort Worth, Texas
Jan 22, 1983	No. 4	at No. 14 Houston	L 60–75	14–1 (4–1)	Hofheinz Pavilion (10,061); Houston, Texas
Jan 24, 1983	No. 4	Texas	W 83–64	15–1 (5–1)	Barnhill Arena; Fayetteville, Arkansas
Jan 26, 1983	No. 12	at Texas Tech	W 62–59	16–1 (6–1)	Lubbock Municipal Coliseum; Lubbock, Texas
Jan 30, 1983*	No. 12	at No. 19 Wake Forest	W 68–65	17–1	Winston-Salem Memorial Coliseum; Winston-Salem, North Carolina
Feb 2, 1983	No. 9	Rice	W 70–43	18–1 (7–1)	Barnhill Arena; Fayetteville, Arkansas
Feb 7, 1983	No. 9	at Baylor	W 81–66	19–1 (8–1)	Heart O' Texas Coliseum; Waco, Texas
Feb 12, 1983	No. 8	Texas A&M	W 62–55	20–1 (9–1)	Barnhill Arena; Fayetteville, Arkansas
Feb 14, 1983	No. 8	SMU	W 71–61	21–1 (10–1)	Barnhill Arena; Fayetteville, Arkansas
Feb 19, 1983	No. 7	at TCU	W 64–56	22–1 (11–1)	Daniel-Meyer Coliseum; Fort Worth, Texas
Feb 23, 1983	No. 6	at Texas	W 84–67	23–1 (12–1)	Frank Erwin Center; Austin, Texas
Feb 26, 1983	No. 6	Texas Tech	W 77–63	24–1 (13–1)	Barnhill Arena (9,276); Fayetteville, Arkansas
Mar 3, 1983	No. 5	No. 1 Houston	L 66–74	24–2 (13–2)	Barnhill Arena (9,512); Fayetteville, Arkansas
Mar 5, 1983	No. 5	at Rice	W 82–55	25–2 (14–2)	Tudor Fieldhouse (2,000); Houston, Texas
SWC Tournament
Mar 12, 1983*	No. 6	vs. TCU; Semifinals	L 59–61 ^{OT}	25–3	Reunion Arena (17,059); Dallas, Texas
NCAA Tournament
Mar 19, 1983*	(4 ME) No. 9	vs. (5 ME) Purdue; Second Round	W 78–68	26–3	Sun Dome (10,146); Tampa, Florida
Mar 24, 1983*	(4 ME) No. 9	vs. (1 ME) No. 2 Louisville; Mideast Regional semifinal – Sweet Sixteen	L 63–65	26–4	Stokely Center (12,489); Knoxville, Tennessee
*Non-conference game. ^{#}Rankings from AP Poll. (#) Tournament seedings in parentheses. ME=Mideast.

== Rankings ==
Ranking movements Legend: ██ Increase in ranking ██ Decrease in ranking — = Not ranked
	Week																
Poll	Pre	1	2	3	4	5	6	7	8	9	10	11	12	13	14	15	Final
AP	17	16	15	13	12	11	10	7	4	12	9	8	7	6	5	6	9
Coaches	20	—	16	13	14	14	12	7	5	11	9	9	7	5	4	5	9

== Awards and honors ==
- Darrell Walker – Consensus Second-Team All-American

== 1983 NBA draft ==
Player	Round	Pick	NBA club
Darrell Walker	1	12	New York Knicks
