= 1982–83 Purdue Boilermakers men's basketball team =

American college basketball season

1982–83 Purdue Boilermakers men's basketball

NCAA tournament, Second round
- Conference: Big Ten Conference
- Record: 21–9 (11–7 Big Ten)
- Head coach: Gene Keady (3rd season)
- Assistant coach: Bruce Weber (3rd season)
- Home arena: Mackey Arena

1982–83 Big Ten Conference men's basketball standings
	Conf.				Overall
Team	W		L	PCT	W		L	PCT
No. 5 Indiana	13	–	5	.722	24	–	6	.800
Purdue	11	–	7	.611	21	–	9	.700
Ohio State	11	–	7	.611	20	–	10	.667
Illinois	11	–	7	.611	21	–	11	.656
Iowa	10	–	8	.556	21	–	10	.677
Minnesota	9	–	9	.500	18	–	11	.621
Michigan State	9	–	9	.500	17	–	13	.567
Northwestern	7	–	11	.389	17	–	13	.567
Michigan	6	–	12	.333	15	–	13	.536
Wisconsin	3	–	15	.167	8	–	20	.286
Rankings from AP Poll

The 1982–83 Purdue Boilermakers men's basketball team represented Purdue University as a member of the Big Ten Conference during the 1982–83 college basketball season. The Boilermakers were led by third-year head coach Gene Keady and played their home games at Mackey Arena in West Lafayette, Indiana. Purdue finished tied for second in the Big Ten standings and received an at-large bid to the NCAA tournament as No. 5 seed in the Mideast region. The Boilermakers were beaten by No. 4 seed Arkansas in the round of 32. The team finished with an overall record of 21–9 (11–7 Big Ten).

== Roster ==
1982–83 Purdue Boilermakers men's basketball team
Players
Coaches

Pos.	#	Name	Height	Weight	Year	Hometown
G	11	Mack Gadis	6 ft 1 in (1.85 m)	—	Fr	Indianapolis, Indiana
F	15	Jim Bullock	6 ft 6 in (1.98 m)	210 lb (95 kg)	So
G	21	Ricky Hall	6 ft 1 in (1.85 m)	—	Jr
C	40	Russell Cross	6 ft 10 in (2.08 m)	210 lb (95 kg)	Jr	Chicago, Illinois
C	41	Jim Rowinski	6 ft 8 in (2.03 m)	240 lb (109 kg)	Jr	Long Island, New York

Head coach

- Gene Keady (Kansas State)

Assistant coach(es)

- Bruce Weber (Milwaukee)

Legend

- (C) Team captain
- (S) Suspended
- (I) Ineligible
- (W) Walk-on
- Injured
- Current redshirt

== Schedule and results ==
Date time, TV	Rank^{#}	Opponent^{#}	Result	Record	Site city, state
Non-Conference Regular Season
Nov 27, 1982*		Eastern Illinois	W 83–54	1–0	Mackey Arena; West Lafayette, Indiana
Nov 29, 1982*		at Boston University	W 79–69	2–0	Case Gym; Boston, Massachusetts
Dec 1, 1982*		Fresno State	W 50–39	3–0	Mackey Arena; West Lafayette, Indiana
Dec 4, 1982*		at No. 7 Louisville	W 69–63	4–0	Freedom Hall; Louisville, Kentucky
Dec 6, 1982*	No. 20	Miami (OH)	W 71–58	5–0	Mackey Arena; West Lafayette, Indiana
Dec 11, 1982*	No. 20	at South Carolina	L 53–59	5–1	Carolina Coliseum; Columbia, South Carolina
Dec 20, 1982*		Evansville	W 95–68	6–1	Mackey Arena; West Lafayette, Indiana
Dec 22, 1982*		DePaul	W 65–63	7–1	Mackey Arena; West Lafayette, Indiana
Dec 30, 1982*		vs. Stetson	W 61–60	8–1	
Big Ten Regular Season
Jan 6, 1983	No. 20	at Wisconsin	W 80–64	10–1 (1–0)	Wisconsin Field House; Madison, Wisconsin
Jan 8, 1983	No. 20	at Minnesota	L 48–54	10–2 (1–1)	Williams Arena; Minneapolis, Minnesota
Jan 13, 1983		No. 20 Ohio State	W 64–57	10–2 (2–1)	Mackey Arena; West Lafayette, Indiana
Mar 12, 1983		Wisconsin	W 79–64	20–8 (11–7)	Mackey Arena; West Lafayette, Indiana
NCAA Tournament
Mar 17, 1983*	(5 ME)	vs. (12 ME) Robert Morris; First round	W 55–53	21–8	Sun Dome; Tampa, Florida
Mar 19, 1983*	(5 ME)	vs. (4 ME) No. 9 Arkansas; Second round	L 68–78	21–9	Sun Dome (10,146); Tampa, Florida
*Non-conference game. ^{#}Rankings from AP Poll. (#) Tournament seedings in parentheses. ME=Mideast. All times are in Eastern Time.
