= 1982–83 Memphis State Tigers men's basketball team =

American college basketball season

1982–83 Memphis State Tigers men's basketball

NCAA tournament, Sweet Sixteen (vacated)
- Conference: Metro Conference (1975–1995)
- Record: 22-7 (23–8 unadjusted) (6–6 Metro)
- Head coach: Dana Kirk (4th season)
- Assistant coaches: Larry Finch (3rd season); Lee Fowler
- Home arena: Mid-South Coliseum

1982–83 Metro Conference men's basketball standings
	Conf.				Overall
Team	W		L	PCT	W		L	PCT
No. 2 Louisville †	12	–	0	1.000	32	–	4	.889
Virginia Tech	7	–	5	.583	23	–	11	.676
Tulane	7	–	5	.583	19	–	12	.613
No. 17 Memphis State	6	–	6	.500	23	–	8	.742
Florida State	5	–	7	.417	14	–	14	.500
Southern Miss	3	–	9	.250	14	–	14	.500
Cincinnati	1	–	11	.083	11	–	17	.393
† 1983 Metro Conference tournament winner Rankings from AP Poll

The 1982–83 Memphis State Tigers men's basketball team represented Memphis State University as a member of the Metro Conference during the 1982–83 NCAA Division I men's basketball season.

The Tigers won Metro Conference regular season and conference tournament titles to receive an automatic bid to the 1983 NCAA tournament. As No. 4 seed in the East region, Memphis State beat No. 5 seed Georgetown to reach the Sweet Sixteen for the second of three straight seasons. The No. 1 Houston Cougars defeated Memphis State, 70–63, in the regional semifinal. The Tigers finished with a 23–8 record (6–6 Metro), though the NCAA tournament results would later be vacated.

== Roster ==
1982–83 Memphis State Tigers men's basketball team
Players
Coaches

Pos.	#	Name	Height	Weight	Year	Hometown
G	10	Andre Turner	5 ft 10 in (1.78 m)	165 lb (75 kg)	Fr	Memphis, Tennessee
G	11	Ricky McCoy	6 ft 2 in (1.88 m)	180 lb (82 kg)	So	Memphis, Tennessee
F	22	Bobby Parks	6 ft 5 in (1.96 m)	185 lb (84 kg)	Jr	Grand Junction, Tennessee
F	24	Keith Lee	6 ft 10 in (2.08 m)	220 lb (100 kg)	So	West Memphis, Arkansas
G	32	Phillip Haynes	6 ft 3 in (1.91 m)	185 lb (84 kg)	Jr	Memphis, Tennessee
F	43	Baskerville Holmes	6 ft 7 in (2.01 m)	190 lb (86 kg)	Fr	Memphis, Tennessee
F	45	Willie Becton	6 ft 5 in (1.96 m)	215 lb (98 kg)	So	Memphis, Tennessee

Head coach

- Dana Kirk

Assistant coach(es)

- Larry Finch (Memphis)
- Lee Fowler (Vanderbilt)

Legend

- (C) Team captain
- (S) Suspended
- (I) Ineligible
- (W) Walk-on
- Injured
- Current redshirt

Roster

== Schedule and results ==
Date time, TV	Rank^{#}	Opponent^{#}	Result	Record	Site city, state
Regular season
Dec 18, 1982*	No. 3	at Kansas	W 64–58	7–0	Allen Fieldhouse; Lawrence, Kansas
Jan 23, 1983*	No. 6	at NC State	W 57–53	13–1	Reynolds Coliseum; Raleigh, North Carolina
Jan 26, 1983*	No. 6	vs. Iona	W 94–88	14–1	
Feb 19, 1983*	No. 13	No. 9 Louisville	L 66–75	18–4	Mid-South Coliseum; Memphis, Tennessee
Metro Conference tournament
Mar 10, 1983*	No. 17	vs. Florida State	W 84–74	22–6	Riverfront Coliseum; Cincinnati, Ohio
Mar 11, 1983*	No. 17	vs. No. 3 Louisville	L 68–71	22–7	Riverfront Coliseum; Cincinnati, Ohio
NCAA Tournament
Mar 20, 1983*	(4 MW) No. 17	vs. (5 MW) No. 20 Georgetown; Second round	W 66–57	23–7	Freedom Hall (16,105); Louisville, Kentucky
Mar 25, 1983*	(4 MW) No. 17	vs. (1 MW) No. 1 Houston; Midwest Regional Final – Sweet Sixteen	L 63–70	23–8	Kemper Arena; Kansas City, Missouri
*Non-conference game. ^{#}Rankings from AP Poll. (#) Tournament seedings in parentheses. MW=Midwest region. All times are in Eastern Time.
