= 1982–83 Ohio State Buckeyes men's basketball team =

American college basketball season

1982–83 Ohio State Buckeyes men's basketball
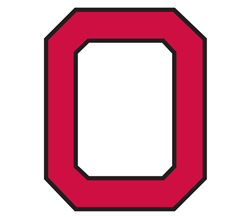

NCAA tournament, Sweet Sixteen
- Conference: Big Ten Conference
- Record: 20–10 (11–7 Big Ten)
- Head coach: Eldon Miller (7th season)
- Home arena: St. John Arena

1982–83 Big Ten Conference men's basketball standings
	Conf.				Overall
Team	W		L	PCT	W		L	PCT
No. 5 Indiana	13	–	5	.722	24	–	6	.800
Purdue	11	–	7	.611	21	–	9	.700
Ohio State	11	–	7	.611	20	–	10	.667
Illinois	11	–	7	.611	21	–	11	.656
Iowa	10	–	8	.556	21	–	10	.677
Minnesota	9	–	9	.500	18	–	11	.621
Michigan State	9	–	9	.500	17	–	13	.567
Northwestern	7	–	11	.389	17	–	13	.567
Michigan	6	–	12	.333	15	–	13	.536
Wisconsin	3	–	15	.167	8	–	20	.286
Rankings from AP Poll

The 1982–83 Ohio State Buckeyes men's basketball team represented Ohio State University during the 1982–83 NCAA Division I men's basketball season. Led by 7th-year head coach Eldon Miller, the Buckeyes finished 20–10 (11–7 Big Ten) and reached the Sweet Sixteen of the NCAA tournament.

== Roster ==
1982–83 Ohio State Buckeyes men's basketball team
Players
Coaches

Pos.	#	Name	Height	Weight	Year	Hometown
F	00	Tony Campbell	6 ft 7 in (2.01 m)	210 lb (95 kg)	Jr	Teaneck, New Jersey
C	13	Granville Waiters	6 ft 11 in (2.11 m)	220 lb (100 kg)	Sr	Columbus, Ohio

Head coach

- Eldon Miller (Wittenberg)

Assistant coach(es)

Legend

- (C) Team captain
- (S) Suspended
- (I) Ineligible
- (W) Walk-on
- Injured
- Current redshirt

== Schedule/results ==
Date time, TV	Rank^{#}	Opponent^{#}	Result	Record	Site (attendance) city, state
Non-conference regular season
Nov 30, 1982*		Chico State	W 78–58	1–0	St. John Arena; Columbus, Ohio
Dec 3, 1982*		at Florida	W 80–74	2–0	Stephen C. O'Connell Center; Gainesville, Florida
Dec 11, 1982*		West Virginia	L 67–69 ^{2OT}	2–1	St. John Arena; Columbus, Ohio
Dec 14, 1982*		at No. 16 Syracuse	L 85–91	2–2	Carrier Dome; Syracuse, New York
Dec 16, 1982*		Youngstown State	W 81–53	3–2	St. John Arena; Columbus, Ohio
Dec 18, 1982*		Arizona State	W 88–77	4–2	St. John Arena; Columbus, Ohio
Dec 21, 1982*		Holy Cross	W 81–60	5–2	St. John Arena; Columbus, Ohio
Dec 28, 1982*		Eastern Michigan	W 58–54	6–2	St. John Arena; Columbus, Ohio
Dec 30, 1982*		South Alabama	W 79–74	7–2	St. John Arena; Columbus, Ohio
Jan 2, 1983*		vs. Kansas	W 64–61	8–2	Kemper Arena; Kansas City, Missouri
Big Ten Regular season
Jan 8, 1983		No. 1 Indiana	W 70–67	9–2 (1–0)	St. John Arena; Columbus, Ohio
Jan 13, 1983		at Purdue	L 57–64	9–3 (1–1)	Mackey Arena; West Lafayette, Indiana
Jan 15, 1983		at Illinois	L 55–63	9–4 (1–2)	Assembly Hall; Champaign, Illinois
Jan 20, 1983		Michigan	W 75–68	10–4 (2–2)	St. John Arena; Columbus, Ohio
Jan 22, 1983		Michigan State	W 74–69	11–4 (3–2)	St. John Arena; Columbus, Ohio
Jan 27, 1983		at No. 14 Iowa	W 89–83	12–4 (4–2)	Carver-Hawkeye Arena; Iowa City, Iowa
Jan 29, 1983		at Northwestern	L 64–66	12–5 (4–3)	Alumni Hall; Evanston, Illinois
Feb 2, 1983		No. 17 Minnesota	L 80–89	12–6 (4–4)	St. John Arena; Columbus, Ohio
Feb 5, 1983		Wisconsin	W 82–69	13–6 (5–4)	St. John Arena; Columbus, Ohio
Feb 9, 1983		at Wisconsin	W 68–65	14–6 (6–4)	Wisconsin Field House; Madison, Wisconsin
Feb 12, 1983		at No. 19 Minnesota	W 74–69	15–6 (7–4)	Williams Arena; Minneapolis, Minnesota
Feb 17, 1983		Northwestern	W 71–55	16–6 (8–4)	St. John Arena; Columbus, Ohio
Feb 19, 1983		No. 16 Iowa	W 85–69	17–6 (9–4)	St. John Arena; Columbus, Ohio
Feb 24, 1983		at Michigan State	L 94–101	17–7 (9–5)	Jenison Field House; East Lansing, Michigan
Feb 26, 1983		at Michigan	W 81–71	18–7 (10–5)	Crisler Arena; Ann Arbor, Michigan
Mar 3, 1983		Illinois	L 73–74	18–8 (10–6)	St. John Arena; Columbus, Ohio
Mar 5, 1983		No. 20 Purdue	W 76–65	19–8 (11–6)	St. John Arena; Columbus, Ohio
Mar 12, 1983		at No. 7 Indiana	L 60–81	19–9 (11–7)	Assembly Hall; Bloomington, Indiana
NCAA tournament
Mar 20, 1983*		vs. Syracuse; Second round	W 79–74	20–9	Hartford Civic Center; Hartford, Connecticut
Mar 25, 1983*		vs. No. 8 North Carolina; East Regional semifinal – Sweet Sixteen	L 51–64	20–10	Carrier Dome; Syracuse, New York
*Non-conference game. ^{#}Rankings from AP Poll. (#) Tournament seedings in parentheses.
