= 1982–83 Iowa Hawkeyes men's basketball team =

American college basketball season

1982–83 Iowa Hawkeyes men's basketball

Amana-Hawkeye Classic Champions Rochester Classic Champions

NCAA tournament, Sweet Sixteen
- Conference: Big Ten Conference
- Record: 21–10 (10–8 Big Ten)
- Head coach: Lute Olson (9th season)
- Assistant coaches: Jim Rosborough; Ken Burmeister; Scott Thompson
- MVP: Bob Hansen
- Home arena: Iowa Field House (Capacity: 13,365); Carver–Hawkeye Arena (Capacity: 15,500) (opened January 1983)

1982–83 Big Ten Conference men's basketball standings
	Conf.				Overall
Team	W		L	PCT	W		L	PCT
No. 5 Indiana	13	–	5	.722	24	–	6	.800
Purdue	11	–	7	.611	21	–	9	.700
Ohio State	11	–	7	.611	20	–	10	.667
Illinois	11	–	7	.611	21	–	11	.656
Iowa	10	–	8	.556	21	–	10	.677
Minnesota	9	–	9	.500	18	–	11	.621
Michigan State	9	–	9	.500	17	–	13	.567
Northwestern	7	–	11	.389	17	–	13	.567
Michigan	6	–	12	.333	15	–	13	.536
Wisconsin	3	–	15	.167	8	–	20	.286
Rankings from AP Poll

The 1982–83 Iowa Hawkeyes men's basketball team represented the University of Iowa in the 1982–83 NCAA Division I men's basketball season as members of the Big Ten Conference. The team was led by head coach Lute Olson, coaching in his ninth and final season at the school, and played their home games at the Iowa Field House and Carver–Hawkeye Arena (opened January 1983) in Iowa City, Iowa.

The Hawkeyes finished the season at 21–10 overall, fifth in the Big Ten at 10–8, and received an at-large bid to the 52-team NCAA tournament as the seventh seed in the Midwest regional. After wins over Utah State and second seed Missouri, Iowa lost to third-seeded Villanova in the Sweet Sixteen.

Following the season, Olson left for Arizona, and was succeeded in April 1983 by George Raveling, who had led Washington State for eleven years.

== Previous season ==
The Hawkeyes finished the 1981–82 season at 21–8, 12–6 in Big Ten play to finish in a three-way tie for second place. They received an at-large bid to the 48-team NCAA tournament and were seeded sixth in West regional. Iowa defeated Northeast Louisiana in the first round, then lost in overtime to eighth-ranked Idaho, the third seed.

== Roster ==
1982–83 Iowa Hawkeyes men's basketball team
Players
Coaches

Pos.	#	Name	Height	Weight	Year	Hometown
G	14	Andre Banks	6 ft 4 in (1.93 m)	—	Fr	Chicago, Illinois
G	15	Steve Carfino	6 ft 2 in (1.88 m)	—	Jr	Los Angeles, California
G	24	Bob Hansen	6 ft 6 in (1.98 m)	—	Sr	Des Moines, Iowa
G	25	Todd Berkenpas	6 ft 2 in (1.88 m)	—	So	Mapleton, Iowa
F	32	Jerry Dennard	6 ft 9 in (2.06 m)	—	Sr	Chowchilla, California
F	34	Craig Anderson	6 ft 7 in (2.01 m)	—	Jr	Madison, Wisconsin
F/C	41	Greg Stokes	6 ft 10 in (2.08 m)	—	So	Hamilton, Ohio
C	42	Michael Payne	6 ft 11 in (2.11 m)	—	So	Quincy, Illinois
F	44	Mark Gannon	6 ft 7 in (2.01 m)	—	Sr	Iowa City, Iowa
G	10	Waymond King	6 ft 1 in (1.85 m)	—	Jr	Kansas City, Missouri
F/C	54	Brad Lohaus	6 ft 11 in (2.11 m)	—	Fr	Phoenix, Arizona

Head coach

- Lute Olson (Augsburg)

Assistant coach(es)

- Jim Rosborough (Iowa)
- Ken Burmeister (St. Mary's (TX))
- Scott Thompson (Iowa)

Legend

- (C) Team captain
- (S) Suspended
- (I) Ineligible
- (W) Walk-on
- Injured
- Current redshirt

== Schedule and results ==
Date time, TV	Rank^{#}	Opponent^{#}	Result	Record	Site city, state
Non-conference regular season
11/27/1982*	No. 11	at BYU	W 91–80	1–0	Marriott Center; Provo, Utah
11/29/1982*	No. 11	at Drake; Rivalry	W 68–63	2–0	Veterans Memorial Auditorium; Des Moines, IA
12/3/1982*	No. 10	Navy; Amana-Hawkeye Classic	W 76–56	3–0	Iowa Field House; Iowa City, IA
12/4/1982*	No. 10	Hawaii; Amana-Hawkeye Classic	W 99–67	4–0	Iowa Field House; Iowa City, IA
12/8/1982*	No. 7	No. 16 Marquette	W 87–66	5–0	Iowa Field House (13,365); Iowa City, IA
12/11/1982*	No. 7	USC	W 66–55	6–0	Iowa Field House (13,365); Iowa City, IA
12/18/1982*	No. 7	at No. 4 UCLA	L 66–75	6–1	Pauley Pavilion (10,867); Los Angeles
12/28/1982*	No. 9	vs. James Madison; Rochester Classic	W 47–45	7–1	War Memorial; Rochester, New York
12/29/1982*	No. 9	vs. Seton Hall; Rochester Classic	W 85–63	8–1	War Memorial; Rochester, New York
Big Ten regular season
1/5/1983	No. 8	Michigan State	L 59–61	8–2 (0–1)	Carver–Hawkeye Arena; Iowa City, IA
1/8/1983	No. 8	Michigan	W 79–72	9–2 (1–1)	Carver–Hawkeye Arena; Iowa City, IA
1/13/1983	No. 12	at Northwestern	W 66–57	10–2 (2–1)	Alumni Hall; Evanston, Illinois
1/15/1983*	No. 12	Iowa State; Rivalry	W 73–56	11–2 (2–1)	Carver–Hawkeye Arena; Iowa City, IA
1/20/1983	No. 10	at No. 16 Minnesota	W 68–52	12–2 (3–1)	Williams Arena (17,273); Minneapolis
1/22/1983	No. 10	at Wisconsin	L 62–65	12–3 (3–2)	Wisconsin Field House; Madison, Wisconsin
1/27/1983	No. 14	Ohio State	L 83–89	12–4 (3–3)	Carver–Hawkeye Arena; Iowa City, IA
1/29/1983	No. 14	No. 2 Indiana	W 63–48	13–4 (4–3)	Carver–Hawkeye Arena; Iowa City, IA
2/3/1983	No. 13	at Illinois	L 61–62	13–5 (4–4)	Assembly Hall (14,181); Champaign, Illinois
2/5/1983	No. 13	at Purdue	L 57–60	13–6 (4–5)	Mackey Arena (14,123); West Lafayette, Indiana
2/10/1983	No. 20	No. 18 Purdue	W 55–46	14–6 (5–5)	Carver–Hawkeye Arena; Iowa City, IA
2/12/1983	No. 20	Illinois	W 68–66	15–6 (6–5)	Carver–Hawkeye Arena; Iowa City, IA
2/16/1983	No. 16	at No. 2 Indiana	W 58–57	16–6 (7–5)	Assembly Hall; Bloomington, Indiana
2/19/1983	No. 16	at No. 20 Ohio State	L 69–85	16–7 (7–6)	St. John Arena (13,591); Columbus, Ohio
2/24/1983	No. 17	Wisconsin	W 93–63	17–7 (8–6)	Carver–Hawkeye Arena (15,450); Iowa City, IA
2/28/1983	No. 17	Minnesota	L 69–71	17–8 (8–7)	Carver–Hawkeye Arena; Iowa City, IA
3/3/1983		Northwestern	W 63–50	18–8 (9–7)	Carver–Hawkeye Arena; Iowa City, IA
3/10/1983		at Michigan	L 60–66	18–9 (9–8)	Crisler Arena; Ann Arbor, Michigan
3/12/1983		at Michigan State	W 75–57	19–9 (10–8)	Jenison Fieldhouse (10,004); East Lansing, Michigan
NCAA Tournament
3/18/1983*	(7 MW)	vs. (10 MW) Utah State; First Round	W 64–59	20–9	Freedom Hall; Louisville, Kentucky
3/20/1983*	(7 MW)	vs. (2 MW) No. 10 Missouri; Second Round	W 77–63	21–9	Freedom Hall; Louisville, Kentucky
3/25/1983*	(7 MW)	vs. (3 MW) No. 13 Villanova; Sweet Sixteen	L 54–55	21–10	Kemper Arena; Kansas City, Missouri
*Non-conference game. ^{#}Rankings from AP Poll Source. (#) Tournament seedings in parentheses.

== NBA draft ==
Round	Pick	Player	NBA club
3	54	Bob Hansen	Utah Jazz
