= 1982–83 Louisville Cardinals men's basketball team =

American college basketball season

1982–83 Louisville Cardinals men's basketball

Metro Conference regular season champions Metro Conference tournament champions

NCAA Men's Division I Tournament, Final Four
- Conference: Metro Conference (1975–1995)

Ranking
- Coaches: No. 2
- AP: No. 2
- Record: 32–4 (12–0 Metro)
- Head coach: Denny Crum (12th season)
- Home arena: Freedom Hall

1982–83 Metro Conference men's basketball standings
	Conf.				Overall
Team	W		L	PCT	W		L	PCT
No. 2 Louisville †	12	–	0	1.000	32	–	4	.889
Virginia Tech	7	–	5	.583	23	–	11	.676
Tulane	7	–	5	.583	19	–	12	.613
No. 17 Memphis State	6	–	6	.500	23	–	8	.742
Florida State	5	–	7	.417	14	–	14	.500
Southern Miss	3	–	9	.250	14	–	14	.500
Cincinnati	1	–	11	.083	11	–	17	.393
† 1983 Metro Conference tournament winner Rankings from AP Poll

The 1982–83 Louisville Cardinals men's basketball team represented the University of Louisville during the 1982–83 NCAA Division I men's basketball season, Louisville's 70th season of intercollegiate competition. The Cardinals competed in the Metro Conference and were coached by Denny Crum, who was in his twelfth season. The team played its home games at Freedom Hall.

The Cardinals won the Metro Conference tournament championship (their 4th), defeating Tulane 66–51. Louisville defeated Kentucky 80–68 (OT) to win the NCAA tournament Mideast Regional and advance to the Final Four (their 6th) where they fell to eventual runner-up Houston 94–81. The Cardinals finished with a 32–4 (11–0) record.

== Roster ==
1982–83 Louisville Cardinals men's basketball team
Players
Coaches

Pos.	#	Name	Height	Weight	Year	Previous school	Hometown
F	00	Robbie Valentine	6 ft 6 in (1.98 m)	200 lb (91 kg)	Fr	North Hardin	Radcliff, Kentucky
G	4	Lancaster Gordon	6 ft 3 in (1.91 m)	185 lb (84 kg)	Jr	Jim Hill	Jackson, Mississippi
G	12	Kent Jones	6 ft 2 in (1.88 m)	182 lb (83 kg)	So	East Kemper	Scooba, Mississippi
G	20	Milt Wagner	6 ft 5 in (1.96 m)	185 lb (84 kg)	So	Camden	Camden, New Jersey
F/C	21	Scooter McCray	6 ft 9 in (2.06 m)	215 lb (98 kg)	Sr	Mt. Vernon	Mount Vernon, New York
F	22	Rodney McCray	6 ft 7 in (2.01 m)	220 lb (100 kg)	Sr	Mt. Vernon	Mount Vernon, New York
G	23	Chris West	6 ft 3 in (1.91 m)	175 lb (79 kg)	Fr	Manual	Louisville, Kentucky
G	25	James Jeter	6 ft 2 in (1.88 m)	160 lb (73 kg)	So	North Hardin	Radcliff, Kentucky
F	30	Manuel Forrest	6 ft 7 in (2.01 m)	200 lb (91 kg)	So	Moore	Louisville, Kentucky
C	33	Charles Jones	6 ft 8 in (2.03 m)	215 lb (98 kg)	Jr	East Kemper	Scooba, Mississippi
G	42	Jeff Hall	6 ft 4 in (1.93 m)	180 lb (82 kg)	Fr	Fairview	Westwood, Kentucky
F	45	Danny Mitchell	6 ft 6 in (1.98 m)	185 lb (84 kg)	So	Crawford County	Eckerty, Indiana
C	55	Billy Thompson	6 ft 8 in (2.03 m)	195 lb (88 kg)	Fr	Camden	Camden, New Jersey

Head coach

- Denny Crum (UCLA)

Assistant coach(es)

- Jerry Jones (Valparaiso)
- Wade Houston (Louisville)
- Bobby Dotson (Western Kentucky)

Legend

- (C) Team captain
- (S) Suspended
- (I) Ineligible
- (W) Walk-on
- Injured
- Current redshirt

Roster
Last update: March 18, 2018

== Schedule ==
Date time, TV	Rank^{#}	Opponent^{#}	Result	Record	Site (attendance) city, state
Regular season
Nov 26, 1982*	No. 8	vs. Florida; Great Alaska Shootout	W 80–63	1–0	Sullivan Arena; Anchorage, Alaska
Nov 27, 1982*	No. 8	vs. Washington; Great Alaska Shootout	W 58–47	2–0	Sullivan Arena; Anchorage, Alaska
Nov 28, 1982*	No. 8	vs. Vanderbilt; Great Alaska Shootout	W 80–70	3–0	Sullivan Arena; Anchorage, Alaska
Dec 1, 1982*	No. 7	at Santa Clara	W 84–56	4–0	Toso Pavilion; Santa Clara, California
Dec 4, 1982*	No. 7	Purdue	L 63–69	4–1	Freedom Hall; Louisville, Kentucky
Dec 8, 1982*	No. 13	Eastern Kentucky	W 82–53	5–1	Freedom Hall; Louisville, Kentucky
Dec 15, 1982*	No. 12	South Alabama	W 94–77	6–1	Freedom Hall; Louisville, Kentucky
Dec 18, 1982*	No. 12	Oklahoma State	W 67–66	7–1	Freedom Hall; Louisville, Kentucky
Dec 21, 1982*	No. 14	No. 15 NC State	W 57–52	8–1	Freedom Hall; Louisville, Kentucky
Dec 29, 1982*	No. 13	at No. 5 UCLA	L 72–76	8–2	Pauley Pavilion; Los Angeles, California
Jan 3, 1983	No. 13	Cincinnati	W 65–58	9–2 (1–0)	Freedom Hall; Louisville, Kentucky
Jan 5, 1982*	No. 13	Kentucky Wesleyan	W 79–58	10–2	Freedom Hall; Louisville, Kentucky
Jan 8, 1983	No. 13	at Florida State	W 96–69	11–2 (2–0)	Tallahassee-Leon County Civic Center; Tallahassee, Florida
Jan 12, 1983*	No. 9	at Duke	W 91–76	12–2	Cameron Indoor Stadium; Durham, North Carolina
Jan 15, 1983*	No. 9	DePaul	W 63–58	13–2	Freedom Hall; Louisville, Kentucky
Jan 17, 1983	No. 9	at Tulane	W 63–55	14–2 (3–0)	Avron B. Fogelman Arena; New Orleans, Louisiana
Jan 22, 1983	No. 9	Southern Miss	W 63–48	15–2 (4–0)	Freedom Hall; Louisville, Kentucky
Jan 26, 1983*	No. 8	vs. Rutgers	W 54–49	16–2	Madison Square Garden; New York, New York
Jan 29, 1983*	No. 8	at No. 6 Virginia	L 81–98	16–3	University Hall; Charlottesville, Virginia
Feb 2, 1983	No. 12	at Cincinnati	W 79–73	17–3 (5–0)	Riverfront Coliseum; Cincinnati, Ohio
Feb 5, 1982*	No. 12	Lamar	W 85–60	18–3	Freedom Hall; Louisville, Kentucky
Feb 7, 1983	No. 11	Florida State	W 89–63	19–3 (6–0)	Freedom Hall; Louisville, Kentucky
Feb 9, 1983	No. 11	Tulane	W 73–56	20–3 (7–0)	Freedom Hall; Louisville, Kentucky
Feb 12, 1983*	No. 11	at Marquette	W 81–73	21–3	MECCA Arena; Milwaukee, Wisconsin
Feb 19, 1983	No. 9	at No. 13 Memphis State	W 75–66	22–3 (8–0)	Mid-South Coliseum; Memphis, Tennessee
Feb 22, 1982*	No. 5	Wright State	W 71–55	23–3	Freedom Hall; Louisville, Kentucky
Feb 26, 1982*	No. 5	at Western Kentucky	W 73–62	24–3	E. A. Diddle Arena; Bowling Green, Kentucky
Feb 28, 1982*	No. 3	Murray State	W 66–58	25–3	Freedom Hall; Louisville, Kentucky
Mar 2, 1983	No. 3	at Virginia Tech	W 73–64	26–3 (9–0)	Cassell Coliseum; Blacksburg, Virginia
Mar 6, 1983	No. 3	No. 17 Memphis State	W 64–62 ^{OT}	27–3 (10–0)	Freedom Hall; Louisville, Kentucky
Metro Conference tournament
Mar 11, 1983	No. 3	vs. No. 17 Memphis State; Semifinals	W 71–68	28–3 (11–0)	Riverfront Coliseum; Cincinnati, Ohio
Mar 12, 1983	No. 3	vs. Tulane; Championship	W 66–51	29–3 (12–0)	Riverfront Coliseum; Cincinnati, Ohio
NCAA Tournament
Mar 20, 1983*	(1 ME) No. 2	vs. (8 ME) Tennessee; Second round	W 70–57	30–3	Roberts Stadium; Evansville, Indiana
Mar 25, 1983*; CBS	(1 ME) No. 2	vs. (4 ME) No. 9 Arkansas; Sweet Sixteen	W 65–63	31–3	Stokely Athletic Center; Knoxville, TN
Mar 27, 1983*; CBS	(1 ME) No. 2	vs. (3 ME) No. 12 Kentucky; Elite Eight	W 80–68 ^{OT}	32–3	Stokely Athletic Center; Knoxville, TN
Apr 2, 1983*; CBS	(1 ME) No. 2	vs. (1 MW) No. 1 Houston; Final Four	L 81–94	32–4	The Pit; Albuquerque, NM
*Non-conference game. ^{#}Rankings from AP Poll. (#) Tournament seedings in parentheses.

== Rankings ==
Ranking movements Legend: ██ Increase in ranking ██ Decrease in ranking
	Week																
Poll	Pre	1	2	3	4	5	6	7	8	9	10	11	12	13	14	15	Final
AP	8	7	13	12	14	13	13	9	9	8	12	11	9	5	3	3	2
Coaches	5	5	12	11	11	9	10	8	8	7	12	11	8	6	3	3	2

== NCAA tournament ==
=== Mideast region ===
First round
8	Tennessee	57
9	Marquette	56
5	Purdue	55
12	Robert Morris	53
6	Illinois State	49
11	Ohio	51
7	Oklahoma	71
10	UAB	63

Second round
8	Tennessee	57
1	Louisville	70
4	Arkansas	78
5	Purdue	68
11	Ohio	40
3	Kentucky	57
2	Indiana	63
7	Oklahoma	49

Regional semifinals
1	Louisville	65
4	Arkansas	63
3	Kentucky	64
2	Indiana	59

Regional finals
1	Louisville	80
3	Kentucky	68

=== Final four ===
National semifinals
E4	Georgia	60
W6	N.C. State	67
ME1	Louisville	81
MW1	Houston	94

National championship game
W6	N.C. State	54
MW1	Houston	52
