= 1982–83 Indiana Hoosiers men's basketball team =

American college basketball season

1982–83 Indiana Hoosiers men's basketball

Big Ten Champions

NCAA Men's Division I Tournament, Sweet Sixteen
- Conference: Big Ten Conference

Ranking
- Coaches: No. 5
- AP: No. 5
- Record: 24–6 (13–5 Big Ten)
- Head coach: Bobby Knight (12th season)
- Captains: Ted Kitchel; Randy Wittman; Jim Thomas
- Home arena: Assembly Hall

1982–83 Big Ten Conference men's basketball standings
	Conf.				Overall
Team	W		L	PCT	W		L	PCT
No. 5 Indiana	13	–	5	.722	24	–	6	.800
Purdue	11	–	7	.611	21	–	9	.700
Ohio State	11	–	7	.611	20	–	10	.667
Illinois	11	–	7	.611	21	–	11	.656
Iowa	10	–	8	.556	21	–	10	.677
Minnesota	9	–	9	.500	18	–	11	.621
Michigan State	9	–	9	.500	17	–	13	.567
Northwestern	7	–	11	.389	17	–	13	.567
Michigan	6	–	12	.333	15	–	13	.536
Wisconsin	3	–	15	.167	8	–	20	.286
Rankings from AP Poll

The 1982–83 Indiana Hoosiers men's basketball team represented Indiana University. Their head coach was Bobby Knight, who was in his 12th year. The team played its home games in Assembly Hall in Bloomington, Indiana, and was a member of the Big Ten Conference.

The Hoosiers finished the regular season with an overall record of 24–6 and a conference record of 13–5, finishing 1st in the Big Ten Conference. As Big Ten Conference Champions, IU was invited to participate in the 1983 NCAA Tournament as a 2-seed. The Hoosiers advanced to the Sweet Sixteen, which was their first since 1981, but they lost to the 3-seed Kentucky Wildcats.

== Roster ==
1982–83 Indiana Hoosiers men's basketball team
Players
Coaches

Pos.	#	Name	Height	Weight	Year	Hometown
G	11	Dan Dakich	6 ft 5 in (1.96 m)	—	So	Merrillville, Indiana
G	20	Jim Thomas	6 ft 3 in (1.91 m)	—	Sr	Fort Lauderdale, Florida
G/F	21	Winston Morgan	6 ft 5 in (1.96 m)	—	So	Anderson, Indiana
G	22	Stew Robinson	6 ft 1 in (1.85 m)	—	Fr	Anderson, Indiana
G	23	Chuck Franz	6 ft 2 in (1.88 m)	—	RS Sr	Clarksville, Indiana
G/F	24	Randy Wittman	6 ft 6 in (1.98 m)	—	Sr	Indianapolis, Indiana
G	25	Cam Cameron	6 ft 2 in (1.88 m)	—	Sr	Terre Haute, Indiana
F	30	Ted Kitchel	6 ft 8 in (2.03 m)	—	Sr	Galveston, Indiana
G	31	Tony Brown	6 ft 2 in (1.88 m)	—	Sr	Chicago, Illinois
C	33	Uwe Blab	7 ft 2 in (2.18 m)	—	So	Munich, Germany
F	40	Tracy Foster	6 ft 4 in (1.93 m)	—	Fr	Fort Wayne, Indiana
F	41	Mike Giomi	6 ft 8 in (2.03 m)	—	Fr	Newark, Ohio
F	42	John Flowers	6 ft 9 in (2.06 m)	—	So	Fort Wayne, Indiana
F	54	Steve Bouchie	6 ft 8 in (2.03 m)	—	Sr	Washington, Indiana

Head coach

Bob Knight (Ohio State)

Assistant coach(es)

Legend

- (C) Team captain
- (S) Suspended
- (I) Ineligible
- (W) Walk-on
- Injured
- Current redshirt

== Schedule/results ==
Date time, TV	Rank^{#}	Opponent^{#}	Result	Record	Site city, state
Regular season
11/27/1982*	No. 9	Ball State	W 91–75	1–0	Assembly Hall; Bloomington, IN
11/29/1982*	No. 9	at Miami (OH)	W 75–59	2–0	Millett Hall; Oxford, OH
12/4/1982*	No. 8	UTEP	W 65–54	3–0	Assembly Hall; Bloomington, IN
12/7/1982*	No. 6	at Notre Dame	W 68–52	4–0	Joyce Center; Notre Dame, IN
12/10/1982*	No. 6	Eastern Michigan; Indiana Classic	W 85–48	5–0	Assembly Hall; Bloomington, IN
12/11/1982*	No. 6	Wyoming; Indiana Classic	W 78–65	6–0	Assembly Hall; Bloomington, IN
12/18/1982*	No. 5	at Kansas State	W 48–46	7–0	Ahearn Field House; Manhattan, KS
12/22/1982*	No. 5	No. 2 Kentucky; Indiana–Kentucky rivalry	W 62–59	8–0	Assembly Hall; Bloomington, IN
12/29/1982*	No. 1	vs. Grambling State; Hoosier Classic	W 110–62	9–0	Market Square Arena; Indianapolis, IN
12/30/1982*	No. 1	vs. Nebraska; Hoosier Classic	W 67–50	10–0	Market Square Arena; Indianapolis, IN
1/8/1983	No. 1	at Ohio State	L 67–70	10–1 (0–1)	St. John Arena; Columbus, OH
1/13/1983	No. 4	at Illinois; Rivalry	W 69–55	11–1 (1–1)	Assembly Hall; Champaign, IL
1/15/1983	No. 4	at Purdue; Rivalry	W 81–78	12–1 (2–1)	Mackey Arena; West Lafayette, IN
1/20/1983	No. 2	Michigan State	W 89–85	13–1 (3–1)	Assembly Hall; Bloomington, IN
1/22/1983	No. 2	Michigan	W 93–76	14–1 (4–1)	Assembly Hall; Bloomington, IN
1/26/1983	No. 2	at Northwestern	W 78–73	15–1 (5–1)	Welsh-Ryan Arena; Evanston, IL
1/29/1983	No. 2	at No. 14 Iowa	L 48–63	15–2 (5–2)	Carver-Hawkeye Arena; Iowa City, IA
2/3/1983	No. 6	Wisconsin	W 83–73	16–2 (6–2)	Assembly Hall; Bloomington, IN
2/3/1983	No. 6	No. 17 Minnesota	W 76–51	17–2 (7–2)	Assembly Hall; Bloomington, IN
2/10/1983	No. 4	at No. 19 Minnesota	W 63–59	18–2 (8–2)	Williams Arena; Minneapolis, MN
2/12/1983	No. 4	at Wisconsin	W 75–56	19–2 (9–2)	Wisconsin Field House; Madison, WI
2/16/1983	No. 2	No. 16 Iowa	L 57–58	19–3 (9–3)	Assembly Hall; Bloomington, IN
2/19/1983	No. 2	Northwestern	W 74–65	20–3 (10–3)	Assembly Hall; Bloomington, IN
2/24/1983	No. 4	at Michigan	L 56–69	20–4 (10–4)	Crisler Arena; Ann Arbor, MI
2/26/1983	No. 4	at Michigan State	L 54–62	20–5 (10–5)	Jenison Fieldhouse; East Lansing, MI
3/3/1983	No. 11	No. 20 Purdue; Rivalry	W 64–41	21–5 (11–5)	Assembly Hall; Bloomington, IN
3/5/1983	No. 11	Illinois; Rivalry	W 67–55	22–5 (12–5)	Assembly Hall; Bloomington, IN
3/12/1983	No. 7	No. 16 Ohio State	W 81–60	23–5 (13–5)	Assembly Hall; Bloomington, IN
NCAA tournament
3/20/1983*	(2) No. 5	vs. (7) Oklahoma; Second Round	W 63–49	24–5	Roberts Municipal Stadium; Evansville, IN
3/24/1983*	(2) No. 5	vs. (3) No. 12 Kentucky; Sweet Sixteen	L 59–64	24–6	Stokely Athletic Center; Knoxville, TN
*Non-conference game. ^{#}Rankings from AP Poll. (#) Tournament seedings in parentheses.
