= 1982–83 Southwestern Louisiana Ragin' Cajuns men's basketball team =

American college basketball season

1982–83 Southwestern Louisiana Ragin' Cajuns men's basketball

NCAA tournament
- Conference: Independent
- Record: 22–7
- Head coach: Bobby Paschal (6th season)
- Home arena: Blackham Coliseum

The 1982–83 Southwestern Louisiana Ragin' Cajuns men's basketball team represented the University of Southwestern Louisiana as an NCAA Independent during the 1982–83 NCAA Division I men's basketball season. The Ragin' Cajuns, led by 6th-year head coach Bobby Paschal, played their home games at Blackham Coliseum in Lafayette, Louisiana. The team received an at-large bid to the NCAA tournament. As the No. 8 seed in the East region, SW Louisiana was defeated by Rutgers in the opening round, 60–53.

== Roster ==
1982–83 Southwestern Louisiana Ragin' Cajuns men's basketball team
Players
Coaches

Pos.	#	Name	Height	Weight	Year	Hometown
F		Graylin Warner	6 ft 8 in (2.03 m)	—	Jr
F		Dion Brown	6 ft 7 in (2.01 m)	—	Jr

Head coach

- Bobby Paschal (Stetson)

Assistant coach(es)

Legend

- (C) Team captain
- (S) Suspended
- (I) Ineligible
- (W) Walk-on
- Injured
- Current redshirt

== Schedule and results ==
Date time, TV	Rank^{#}	Opponent^{#}	Result	Record	Site (attendance) city, state
Regular season
Dec 2, 1982*		New Orleans	W 70–68	1–0	Blackham Coliseum; Lafayette, Louisiana
Dec 4, 1982*		at Louisiana Tech	W 46–45	2–0	Thomas Assembly Center; Ruston, Louisiana
Dec 15, 1982*		UC Santa Barbara	W 97–84	3–0	Blackham Coliseum; Lafayette, Louisiana
Dec 17, 1982*		East Carolina	W 83–55	4–0	Blackham Coliseum; Lafayette, Louisiana
Dec 18, 1982*		New Mexico State	W 87–84	5–0	Blackham Coliseum; Lafayette, Louisiana
Dec 20, 1982*		vs. UC Irvine	W 81–67	6–0	Centennial Coliseum; Reno, Nevada
Dec 21, 1982*		at Nevada	W 69–63	7–0	Centennial Coliseum; Reno, Nevada
Dec 28, 1982*		vs. Michigan State; Sugar Bowl Tournament	W 71–66	8–0	Avron B. Fogelman Arena; New Orleans, Louisiana
Dec 29, 1982*		vs. Mississippi State; Sugar Bowl Tournament	L 56–65	8–1	Avron B. Fogelman Arena; New Orleans, Louisiana
Jan 10, 1983*		at No. 16 Houston	L 78–79	8–2	Hofheinz Pavilion; Houston, Texas
NCAA Tournament
Mar 18, 1983*	(8 E)	vs. (9 E) Rutgers; First round	L 53–60	22–7	Hartford Civic Center; Hartford, Connecticut
*Non-conference game. ^{#}Rankings from AP Poll. (#) Tournament seedings in parentheses. E=East. All times are in Central Time.
