= 1983 National Invitation Tournament =

Annual NCAA college basketball competition

- Season: 1982–83
- Teams: 32
- Finals site: Madison Square Garden, New York City
- Champions: Fresno State Bulldogs (1st title)
- Runner-up: DePaul Blue Demons (3rd title game)
- Semifinalists: Nebraska Cornhuskers (1st semifinal); Wake Forest Demon Deacons (1st semifinal)
- Winning coach: Boyd Grant (1st title)
- MVP: Ron Anderson (Fresno State)

The 1983 National Invitation Tournament was the 1983 edition of the annual NCAA college basketball competition.

== Selected teams ==
Thirty-two teams accepted invitations to the tournament.

- Alabama State
- Arizona State
- Bowling Green
- Cal State Fullerton
- DePaul
- East Tennessee State
- Fordham
- Fresno State
- Idaho
- Iona
- LSU
- Michigan State
- Minnesota
- Mississippi
- Murray State
- Nebraska
- New Orleans
- Northwestern
- Notre Dame
- Old Dominion
- Oregon State
- St. Bonaventure
- South Carolina
- South Florida
- TCU
- UTEP
- Tulane
- Tulsa
- Vanderbilt
- Virginia Tech
- Wake Forest
- William & Mary

== Bracket ==
Below are the four first round brackets, along with the four-team championship bracket.

First Round
Vanderbilt	79
East Tennessee State	73
Wake Forest	87
Murray State	80
South Carolina	100
Old Dominion	90
Virginia Tech	85
William & Mary	79

Second Round
Vanderbilt	68
Wake Forest	75
South Carolina	76
Virginia Tech	75

Quarterfinals
Wake Forest	78
South Carolina	61

First Round
Oregon State	77
Idaho	59
New Orleans	99
LSU	94
Michigan State	72
Bowling Green	71
Fresno State	71
UTEP	64

Second Round
Oregon State	88
New Orleans	71
Michigan State	58
Fresno State	72

Quarterfinals
Oregon State	67
Fresno State	76

First Round
Nebraska	72
Tulane	65
Iona	90
St. Bonaventure	76
Arizona State	87
Cal State Fullerton	83
TCU	64
Tulsa	62

Second Round
Nebraska	85
Iona	73
Arizona State	76
TCU	78

Quarterfinals
Nebraska	67
TCU	57

First Round
DePaul	76
Minnesota	73
Northwestern	71
Notre Dame	57
Mississippi	87
Alabama State	75
South Florida	81
Fordham	69

Second Round
DePaul	65
Northwestern	63
Mississippi	65
South Florida	57

Quarterfinals
DePaul	75
Mississippi	67

=== Semifinals & finals ===
Semifinals
Wake Forest	62
Fresno State	86
Nebraska	58
DePaul	68

Finals
Fresno State	69
DePaul	60

== See also ==
- 1983 National Women's Invitational Tournament
- 1983 NCAA Division I men's basketball tournament
- 1983 NCAA Division II men's basketball tournament
- 1983 NCAA Division III men's basketball tournament
- 1983 NCAA Division I women's basketball tournament
- 1983 NCAA Division II women's basketball tournament
- 1983 NCAA Division III women's basketball tournament
- 1983 NAIA Division I men's basketball tournament
- 1983 NAIA Division I women's basketball tournament
