= 1983 NCAA Division I men's basketball tournament =

Edition of USA college basketball tournament

- Season: 1982–83
- Teams: 52
- Finals site: The Pit, Albuquerque, New Mexico
- Champions: NC State Wolfpack (2nd title, 2nd title game, 3rd Final Four)
- Runner-up: Houston Cougars (1st title game, 4th Final Four)
- Semifinalists: Georgia Bulldogs (1st Final Four); Louisville Cardinals (6th Final Four)
- Winning coach: Jim Valvano (1st title)
- MOP: Akeem Olajuwon (Houston)
- Attendance: 364,356
- Top scorer: Dereck Whittenburg (NC State) (120 points)

The 1983 NCAA Division I men's basketball tournament involved 52 schools playing in single-elimination play to determine the national champion of men's NCAA Division I college basketball. The 45th annual edition of the tournament began on March 17, 1983, and ended with the championship game on April 4 at The Pit, then officially known as University Arena, on the campus of the University of New Mexico in Albuquerque. A total of 51 games were played.

North Carolina State, coached by Jim Valvano, won the national title with a 54–52 victory in the final game over Houston, coached by Guy Lewis. The ending of the final game is one of the most famous in college basketball history, with a buzzer-beating dunk by Lorenzo Charles off a desperation shot from 30 feet out by Dereck Whittenburg. This would also be NC State's last appearance in the Final Four until 2024.

Both Charles's dunk and Valvano's running around the court in celebration immediately after the game have been staples of NCAA tournament coverage ever since. North Carolina State's victory has often been considered one of the greatest upsets in college basketball history, and is the fourth biggest point-spread upset in Championship Game history.

Akeem Olajuwon of Houston was named the tournament's Most Outstanding Player, becoming the last player to date to earn this award while playing for a team that failed to win the national title.

== National championship game ==
In the final game, played in Albuquerque, New Mexico, NC State led at halftime by a score of 33–25. Houston was hampered by foul trouble that plagued star Clyde Drexler, who picked up four first half fouls. In the second half, the Cougars came out with a second wind and established control of the game, eventually taking a seven-point lead.

However, things were not all good for Houston. Since the game was played in Albuquerque, players had to deal with the city's mile-high altitude. The Cougars' star center, Akeem Olajuwon, had problems adjusting to the environment and tired quickly, needing to check out of the game multiple times so he could put on an oxygen mask and recover. With Olajuwon on the bench, Houston head coach Guy Lewis decided that in order to protect the lead and the health of his big man at the same time, the Cougars needed to start slowing the game down.

Once again, this enabled the Wolfpack to return to their standby strategy of extending the game. Houston's free throw shooting was very suspect entering the game, which worked greatly in NC State's favor as they were able to rally back and even the score at 52 in the final two minutes. On what would be the last Houston possession, Valvano called for his players to back off and let freshman guard Alvin Franklin bring the ball up the court. The Wolfpack defenders would let the Cougars employ their slowdown strategy of passing it around. Once the ball got back to Franklin he was to be fouled immediately. With 1:05 left, the freshman was fouled and sent to the line for a one-and-one. The idea to foul Franklin sprung from the enormity of the moment; NC State believed that the relatively inexperienced Franklin could not withstand the pressure of going to the line with the championship at stake and knowing that fifty million viewers were tuned in to watch the game. The theory proved correct as Franklin failed to convert and the Wolfpack grabbed the rebound. Valvano called timeout with 44 seconds left and drew up a play for senior guard Dereck Whittenburg during the timeout, which called for the team to pass him the ball with ten seconds left on the clock so he could take the final shot.

Houston needed a defensive stop so they could get another chance to close out the game. Lewis decided to move from the man-to-man defense his team had been running the whole game to a half court zone trap defense. The Wolfpack, who were not expecting the defensive adjustment, were forced to deviate and began passing the ball around just to keep the Cougars from stealing it. Houston nearly got the turnover it was looking for when Whittenburg made an errant pass to Terry Gannon that Drexler nearly came away with before the sophomore regained control of the ball. The ball eventually wound up in the hands of guard Sidney Lowe, who gave it to forward and fellow senior Thurl Bailey in the corner.

Trying to keep the ball moving, as he had been double teamed as soon as he received the pass, Bailey looked back toward Whittenburg, who was approximately thirty feet away from the hoop near midcourt. Bailey threw what Whittenburg would later call a "poor fundamental" overhanded pass which Houston's Benny Anders, guarding Whittenburg on the play, was in position to steal. At this point, Whittenburg hearkened back to his high school days with Morgan Wootten at DeMatha Catholic High School, where he was taught to always catch the basketball with both hands. If Whittenburg had not attempted to do so in this case, Anders may have gotten the steal and a game-winning breakaway layup. In college basketball at the time, the game clock continued to run after a made field goal, and the Wolfpack likely would not have had time even to inbound the ball. As it was, Anders knocked the ball out of Whittenburg's hands, but Whittenburg quickly regained control.

The clock, meanwhile, had ticked down to five seconds and Whittenburg was still standing a significant distance from the goal. Once he regained control, Whittenburg turned and launched a desperation shot, later claimed by Whittenburg to be a pass, to try and win the game for NC State. The shot's trajectory took it to the front of the basket where Olajuwon was covering Wolfpack center Lorenzo Charles. As he watched the shot, Olajuwon said he knew the shot was going to come up short but he also did not want to go for the ball too early because of the potential for goaltending. Charles took advantage of the indecision by Olajuwon and went up for the air ball, and, in one motion, he scored the go-ahead points with a two-handed dunk. The final second ticked off the clock before Houston could inbound the ball (the rule which stops the clock on a made basket in the last minute of the second half and any overtime period(s) was not adopted until the 1993–94 season), and with that, the game ended, and the Wolfpack were the national champions.

== Schedule and venues ==
1983 sites for play-in (orange) and first and second (green) rounds
1983 Regionals (blue) and Final Four (red)

The following are the sites that were selected to host each round of the 1983 tournament:

Opening Round

- March 15
  - East & West Regions
    - Palestra, Philadelphia, Pennsylvania (Hosts: University of Pennsylvania, Ivy League)
  - Mideast & Midwest Regions
    - University of Dayton Arena, Dayton, Ohio (Host: University of Dayton)

First and Second Rounds

- March 17 and 19
  - East Region
    - Greensboro Coliseum, Greensboro, North Carolina (Host: Atlantic Coast Conference)
  - Mideast Region
    - USF Sun Dome, Tampa, Florida (Host: University of South Florida)
  - Midwest Region
    - The Summit, Houston, Texas (Hosts: University of Houston, Rice University, Southwest Conference)
  - West Region
    - BSU Pavilion, Boise, Idaho (Host: Boise State University)
- March 18 and 20
  - East Region
    - Hartford Civic Center, Hartford, Connecticut (Host: University of Connecticut)
  - Mideast Region
    - Roberts Municipal Stadium, Evansville, Indiana (Hosts: University of Evansville, Midwestern City Conference)
  - Midwest Region
    - Freedom Hall, Louisville, Kentucky (Host: University of Louisville)
  - West Region
    - Gill Coliseum, Corvallis, Oregon (Host: Oregon State University)

Regional semifinals and finals (Sweet Sixteen and Elite Eight)

- March 24 and 26
  - Mideast Regional, Stokely Athletic Center, Knoxville, Tennessee (Host: University of Tennessee)
  - West Regional, Dee Events Center, Ogden, Utah (Host: Weber State University)
- March 25 and 27
  - East Regional, Carrier Dome, Syracuse, New York (Host: Syracuse University)
  - Midwest Regional, Kemper Arena, Kansas City, Missouri (Host: Big 8 Conference)

National semifinals and championship (Final Four and championship)

- April 2 and 4
  - University Arena ("The Pit"), Albuquerque, New Mexico (Host: University of New Mexico)

== Teams ==
Region	Seed	Team	Coach	Conference	Finished	Final Opponent	Score
East
East	1	St. John's	Lou Carnesecca	Big East	Sweet Sixteen	4 Georgia	L 70–67
East	2	North Carolina	Dean Smith	ACC	Regional Runner-up	4 Georgia	L 82–77
East	3	Ohio State	Eldon Miller	Big Ten	Sweet Sixteen	2 North Carolina	L 64–51
East	4	Georgia	Hugh Durham	SEC	Final Four	6 NC State	L 67–60
East	5	VCU	J.D. Barnett	Sun Belt	Second Round	4 Georgia	L 56–54
East	6	Syracuse	Jim Boeheim	Big East	Second Round	3 Ohio State	L 79–74
East	7	West Virginia	Gale Catlett	Atlantic 10	First round	10 James Madison	L 57–50
East	8	Southwestern Louisiana	Bobby Paschal	Independent	First round	9 Rutgers	L 60–53
East	9	Rutgers	Tom Young	Atlantic 10	Second Round	1 St. John's	L 66–55
East	10	James Madison	Lou Campanelli	ECAC South	Second Round	2 North Carolina	L 68–49
East	11	Morehead State	Wayne Martin	Ohio Valley	First round	6 Syracuse	L 74–59
East	12	Boston University	Rick Pitino	ECAC North	Preliminary Round	12 La Salle	L 70–58
East	12	La Salle	Lefty Ervin	East Coast	First round	5 VCU	L 76–67
Mideast
Mideast	1	Louisville	Denny Crum	Metro	Final Four	1 Houston	L 94–81
Mideast	2	Indiana	Bob Knight	Big Ten	Sweet Sixteen	3 Kentucky	L 64–59
Mideast	3	Kentucky	Joe B. Hall	SEC	Regional Runner-up	1 Louisville	L 80–68
Mideast	4	Arkansas	Eddie Sutton	Southwest	Sweet Sixteen	1 Louisville	L 65–63
Mideast	5	Purdue	Gene Keady	Big Ten	Second Round	4 Arkansas	L 78–68
Mideast	6	Illinois State	Bob Donewald	Missouri Valley	First round	11 Ohio	L 51–49
Mideast	7	Oklahoma	Billy Tubbs	Big Eight	Second Round	2 Indiana	L 63–49
Mideast	8	Tennessee	Don DeVoe	SEC	Second Round	1 Louisville	L 70–57
Mideast	9	Marquette	Hank Raymonds	Independent	First round	8 Tennessee	L 57–56
Mideast	10	UAB	Gene Bartow	Sun Belt	First round	7 Oklahoma	L 71–63
Mideast	11	Ohio	Danny Nee	MAC	Second Round	3 Kentucky	L 57–40
Mideast	12	Georgia Southern	Frank Kerns	Trans America	Preliminary Round	12 Robert Morris	L 64–54
Mideast	12	Robert Morris	Matt Furjanic	ECAC Metro	First round	5 Purdue	L 55–53
Midwest
Midwest	1	Houston	Guy Lewis	Southwest	Runner Up	6 NC State	L 54–52
Midwest	2	Missouri	Norm Stewart	Big Eight	Second Round	7 Iowa	L 77–63
Midwest	3	Villanova	Rollie Massimino	Big East	Regional Runner-up	1 Houston	L 89–71
Midwest	4	Memphis State (vacated)	Dana Kirk	Metro	Sweet Sixteen	1 Houston	L 70–63
Midwest	5	Georgetown	John Thompson	Big East	Second Round	4 Memphis State	L 66–57
Midwest	6	Alabama	Wimp Sanderson	SEC	First round	11 Lamar	L 73–50
Midwest	7	Iowa	Lute Olson	Big Ten	Sweet Sixteen	3 Villanova	L 55–54
Midwest	8	Maryland	Lefty Driesell	ACC	Second Round	1 Houston	L 60–50
Midwest	9	Chattanooga	Murray Arnold	Southern	First round	8 Maryland	L 52–51
Midwest	10	Utah State	Rod Tueller	Pacific Coast	First round	7 Iowa	L 64–59
Midwest	11	Lamar	Pat Foster	Southland	Second Round	3 Villanova	L 60–58
Midwest	12	Alcorn State	Davey Whitney	SWAC	First round	5 Georgetown	L 68–63
Midwest	12	Xavier	Bob Staak	Midwestern City	Preliminary Round	12 Alcorn State	L 81–75
West
West	1	Virginia	Terry Holland	ACC	Regional Runner-up	6 NC State	L 63–62
West	2	UCLA	Larry Farmer	Pacific-10	Second Round	10 Utah	L 67–61
West	3	UNLV	Jerry Tarkanian	Pacific Coast	Second Round	6 NC State	L 71–70
West	4	Boston College	Gary Williams	Big East	Sweet Sixteen	1 Virginia	L 95–92
West	5	Oklahoma State	Paul Hansen	Big Eight	First round	12 Princeton	L 56–53
West	6	NC State	Jim Valvano	ACC	Champion	1 Houston	W 54–52
West	7	Illinois	Lou Henson	Big Ten	First round	10 Utah	L 52–49
West	8	Washington State	George Raveling	Pacific-10	Second Round	1 Virginia	L 54–49
West	9	Weber State	Neil McCarthy	Big Sky	First round	8 Washington State	L 62–52
West	10	Utah	Jerry Pimm	WAC	Sweet Sixteen	6 NC State	L 75–56
West	11	Pepperdine	Jim Harrick	West Coast	First round	6 NC State	L 69–67
West	12	North Carolina A&T	Don Corbett	MEAC	Preliminary Round	12 Princeton	L 53–41
West	12	Princeton	Pete Carril	Ivy League	Second Round	4 Boston College	L 51–42

== Bracket ==
* – Denotes overtime period

=== Preliminary round ===
East #12 Seed; Philadelphia, Pennsylvania
12	La Salle	70
12	Boston University	58

Mideast #12 Seed; Dayton, Ohio
12	Robert Morris	64
12	Georgia Southern	54

Midwest #12 Seed; Dayton, Ohio
12	Alcorn State	81
12	Xavier	75

West #12 Seed; Philadelphia, Pennsylvania
12	Princeton	51
12	North Carolina A&T	42

=== East region ===
First round
8	Southwest Louisiana	53
9	Rutgers	60
5	VCU	76
12	La Salle	67
6	Syracuse	74
11	Morehead State	59
7	West Virginia	50
10	James Madison	57

Quarter-finals
9	Rutgers	55
1	St. John's	66
4	Georgia	56
5	VCU	54
6	Syracuse	74
3	Ohio State	79
2	North Carolina	68
10	James Madison	49

Regional semifinals
1	St. John's	67
4	Georgia	70
3	Ohio State	51
2	North Carolina	64

Regional Finals
4	Georgia	82
2	North Carolina	77

=== West region ===
First round
8	Washington State	62
9	Weber State	52
5	Oklahoma State	53
12	Princeton	56
6	NC State	69
11	Pepperdine	67**
7	Illinois	49
10	Utah	52

Quarter-finals
8	Washington State	49
1	Virginia	54
4	Boston College	51
12	Princeton	42
6	NC State	71
3	UNLV	70
2	UCLA	61
10	Utah	67

Regional semifinals
1	Virginia	95
4	Boston College	92
6	NC State	75
10	Utah	56

Regional Finals
1	Virginia	62
6	NC State	63

=== Mideast region ===
First round
8	Tennessee	57
9	Marquette	56
5	Purdue	55
12	Robert Morris	53
6	Illinois State	49
11	Ohio	51
7	Oklahoma	71
10	UAB	63

Quarter-finals
8	Tennessee	57
1	Louisville	70
4	Arkansas	78
5	Purdue	68
11	Ohio	40
3	Kentucky	57
2	Indiana	63
7	Oklahoma	49

Regional semifinals
1	Louisville	65
4	Arkansas	63
3	Kentucky	64
2	Indiana	59

Regional Finals
1	Louisville	80
3	Kentucky	68*

=== Midwest region ===
First round
8	Maryland	52
9	Chattanooga	51
5	Georgetown	68
12	Alcorn State	63
6	Alabama	50
11	Lamar	73
7	Iowa	64
10	Utah State	59

Quarter-finals
8	Maryland	50
1	Houston	60
4	Memphis State#	66
5	Georgetown	57
11	Lamar	58
3	Villanova	60
2	Missouri	63
7	Iowa	77

Regional semifinals
1	Houston	70
4	Memphis State#	63
3	Villanova	55
7	Iowa	54

Regional Finals
1	Houston	89
3	Villanova	71

# - Memphis State was forced to vacate its NCAA tournament appearance after a massive gambling scandal and a criminal investigation into head coach Dana Kirk. Unlike forfeiture, a vacated game does not result in the other school being credited with a win, only with Memphis removing the wins from its own record.

=== Final Four ===
National semifinals Saturday, April 2
E4	Georgia	60
W6	NC State	67
ME1	Louisville	81
MW1	Houston	94

National Final; Monday, April 4
W6	NC State	54
MW1	Houston	52

== Tournament notes ==
The Louisville vs. Houston semi-final was a matchup of the #1 vs. #2 team. The #1 ranked Houston Cougars (nicknamed Phi Slama Jama) vs. #2 the Louisville Cardinals (nicknamed "The Doctors of Dunk") was considered likely to produce the national champion. It featured two strong offensive teams that specialized in the slam dunk. Both teams put on a show of offense, with Houston winning out over Louisville 94–81.

Another historically significant game in this tournament was the Mideast Regional final between Kentucky and Louisville, in-state rivals that had not played one another in basketball since the 1959 NCAA tournament, and had not played in the regular season since 1922. After regulation time ended with Kentucky tying the game at the buzzer, Louisville dominated the overtime to advance to the Final Four. This result directly led to the start of the Battle for the Bluegrass annual basketball series between the two schools that November.

A historically significant run in the tournament was that of Georgia, who became the last team to date to advance to the Final Four in its first-ever NCAA Tournament appearance. But the NC State team led by Jim Valvano became the archetype of the "Cinderella team", the underdog that many fans look to as a possible spoiler over top-ranked teams. This label has, since then, been applied to many programs, including Villanova in 1985, Gonzaga in 1999, George Mason in 2006, Butler in 2010 and 2011, VCU in 2011, Wichita State in 2013, Loyola Chicago in 2018, UCLA in 2021, Saint Peter's in 2022, Florida Atlantic in 2023, and NC State in 2024. Not only did NC State beat Houston to win the championship, but they also beat #1 seeded Virginia on their way to the Final Four. The Wolfpack did not assure themselves of a tournament bid until they upset Virginia in the championship game of the ACC tournament. North Carolina State became the first team in tournament history to win six games en route to the title (the tournament being 32 teams or fewer prior to 1979, and all champions from 1979 to 1982 had first-round byes).

Christopher Cross' "All Right" accompanied the highlight montage at the end of CBS' broadcast of the championship game.

== Announcers ==
- Gary Bender and Billy Packer – First (Illinois–Utah) and Second (Virginia–Washington State, UCLA–Utah) Rounds at Boise, Idaho; Second Round at Evansville, Indiana (Indiana–Oklahoma, Louisville–Tennessee); Midwest Regional semifinal (Houston–Memphis State) at Kansas City, Missouri; Mideast Regional Final at Knoxville, Tennessee; Midwest Regional Final at Kansas City, Missouri; Final Four at Albuquerque, New Mexico
- Frank Glieber and Larry Conley – East Regional Final at Syracuse, New York
- Tom Hammond and Larry Conley – Preliminary Round at Dayton, Ohio; Mideast Regional semifinals at Knoxville, Tennessee
- Dick Stockton and Steve Grote – First (NC State–Pepperdine) and Second (UNLV–NC State, Boston College–Princeton) Rounds at Corvallis, Oregon; West Regional Final at Ogden, Utah
- Jim Thacker and Bill Raftery – East Regional semifinals at Syracuse, New York
- Fred White and Gary Thompson – Midwest Regional semifinal (Villanova–Iowa) at Kansas City, Missouri
- Dick Stockton and Billy Packer – West Regional semifinal (Virginia–Boston College) at Ogden, Utah
- Larry Zimmer and Irv Brown – West Regional semifinal (NC State–Utah) at Ogden, Utah
- Jim Thacker and Larry Conley – Second Round at Greensboro, North Carolina (North Carolina–James Madison, Georgia–VCU)
- Verne Lundquist and Bill Raftery – First (Syracuse–Morehead State, Southwestern Louisiana–Rutgers) and Second (Ohio State–Syracuse, St. John's–Rutgers) Rounds at Hartford, Connecticut
- Frank Herzog and James Brown – Second Round at Tampa, Florida (Kentucky–Ohio, Arkansas–Purdue)
- Tim Ryan and Lynn Shackelford – Second Round at Houston, Texas (Villanova–Lamar, Houston–Maryland)
- Frank Glieber and Irv Brown – Second Round at Louisville, Kentucky (Memphis State–Georgetown, Missouri–Iowa)
- Jim Thacker and Jeff Mullins – First round at Greensboro, North Carolina (West Virginia–James Madison, VCU–La Salle)
- Tom Hammond and Irv Brown - First round at Louisville, Kentucky (Georgetown–Alcorn State, Iowa–Utah State)

== See also ==
- 1983 NCAA Division II men's basketball tournament
- 1983 NCAA Division III men's basketball tournament
- 1983 NCAA Division I women's basketball tournament
- 1983 NCAA Division II women's basketball tournament
- 1983 NCAA Division III women's basketball tournament
- 1983 National Invitation Tournament
- 1983 National Women's Invitation Tournament
- 1983 NAIA Division I men's basketball tournament
- 1983 NAIA Division I women's basketball tournament
