= 1982–83 NCAA Division I men's basketball rankings =

- Season: 1982–83
- NCAA Tournament: 1983
- Preseason No. 1: Virginia
- NCAA Tournament Champions: NC State
NCAA Division I men's basketball rankings


The 1982–83 NCAA Division I men's basketball rankings was made up of two human polls, the AP Poll and the Coaches Poll, in addition to various other preseason polls.

== Legend ==
	Increase in ranking
	Decrease in ranking
	New to rankings from previous week
Italics	Number of first place votes
(#–#)	Win–loss record
т	Tied with team above or below also with this symbol

== AP Poll ==
	Preseason	Week 2 Nov. 29	Week 3 Dec. 6	Week 4 Dec. 13	Week 5 Dec. 20	Week 6 Dec. 27	Week 7 Jan. 3	Week 8 Jan. 10	Week 9 Jan. 17	Week 10 Jan. 24	Week 11 Jan. 31	Week 12 Feb. 7	Week 13 Feb. 14	Week 14 Feb. 21	Week 15 Feb. 28	Week 16 Mar. 7	Final Mar. 14	
1.	Virginia	Virginia (2–0)	Virginia (4–0)	Virginia (6–0)	Virginia (8–0)	Indiana (8–0)	Indiana (10–0)	Memphis State (11–1)	UCLA (11–1)	UCLA (13–1)	North Carolina (17–3)	North Carolina (20–3)	UNLV (22–0)	UNLV (24–0)	Houston (23–2)	Houston (25–2)	Houston (27–2)	1.
2.	Georgetown	Georgetown (2–0)	Kentucky (3–0)	Kentucky (5–0)	Kentucky (7–0)	Memphis State (8–0)	Memphis State (9–0)	Virginia (11–1)	Indiana (12–1)	Indiana (14–1)	UNLV (18–0)	UNLV (20–0)	Indiana (19–2)	Houston (22–2)	Virginia (23–3)	Virginia (25–3)	Louisville (29–3)	2.
3.	North Carolina	Kentucky (1–0)	Georgetown (5–0)	Memphis State (6–0)	UCLA (5–0)	Kentucky (7–1)	Kentucky (8–1)	St. John's (13–0)	North Carolina (12–3)	North Carolina (15–3)	Virginia (17–2)	Virginia (19–2)	North Carolina (21–4)	Virginia (21–3)	Louisville (24–3)	Louisville (27–3)	St. John's (27–4)	3.
4.	Kentucky	Villanova (1–0)	Memphis State (4–0)	UCLA (4–0)	Memphis State (7–0)	Virginia (8–1)	Virginia (10–1)	Indiana (10–1)	Arkansas (13–0)	UNLV (16–0)	Memphis State (16–1)	Indiana (16–2)	Houston (20–2)	Indiana (20–3)	Villanova (21–4)	UCLA (22–4)	Virginia (27–4)	4.
5.	Villanova	Memphis State (2–0)	UCLA (3–0)	Indiana (6–0) т	Indiana (7–0)	UCLA (6–1)	Alabama (8–0)	UCLA (9–1)	UNLV (14–0)	Memphis State (14–1)	St. John's (18–1)	UCLA (16–2)	Virginia (19–3)	Louisville (22–3)	Arkansas (24–1)	North Carolina (25–6)	Indiana (23–5)	5.
6.	Memphis State	UCLA (1–0)	Indiana (3–0)	Georgetown (6–1) т	Missouri (6–0)	Alabama (6–0)	UCLA (7–1)	Kentucky (11–2)	Memphis State (12–1)	Virginia (15–2)	Indiana (15–2)	Houston (18–2)	St. John's (20–2)	Arkansas (22–1)	UCLA (21–3)	Arkansas (25–2)	UNLV (28–2)	6.
7.	UCLA	Louisville (3–0)	Iowa (4–0)	Iowa (6–0)	St. John's (9–0)	St. John's (9–0)	St. John's (10–0)	Arkansas (11–0)	Virginia (12–2)	St. John's (17–1)	UCLA (14–2)	St. John's (19–2)	Arkansas (20–1)	Villanova (19–4)	Kentucky (20–5)	Indiana (22–5)	UCLA (23–5)	7.
8.	Louisville	Indiana (2–0)	Missouri (2–0)	Missouri (6–0)	Alabama (5–0)	Tennessee (7–0)	Iowa (8–1)	UNLV (12–0)	St. John's (14–1)	Louisville (15–2)	Houston (16–2)	Arkansas (19–1)	Villanova (17–4)	UCLA (19–3)	North Carolina (23–6)	St. John's (24–4)	North Carolina (26–7)	8.
9.	Indiana	Missouri (1–0)	Houston (4–0)	St. John's (7–0)	Tennessee (6–0)	Iowa (6–1)	Syracuse (10–0)	Louisville (11–2)	Louisville (13–2)	Houston (15–2)	Arkansas (17–1)	Memphis State (18–2)	Louisville (21–3)	St. John's (22–3)	UNLV (24–2)	UNLV (25–2)	Arkansas (25–3)	9.
10.	Oregon State	Iowa (2–0)	Villanova (1–1)	Alabama (4–0)	Iowa (6–1)	Georgetown (7–2)	Arkansas (7–0)	Alabama (9–2)	Iowa (10–2)	Kentucky (13–3)	Missouri (16–3)	Missouri (18–3)	UCLA (17–3)	Kentucky (18–5)	St. John's (23–4)	Kentucky (21–6)	Missouri (26–7)	10.
11.	Iowa	Houston (2–0)	Alabama (2–0)	Tennessee (4–0)	Georgetown (6–2)	Arkansas (6–0)	UNLV (10–0)	North Carolina (10–3)	Kentucky (11–3)	Villanova (12–3)	Villanova (13–3)	Louisville (19–3)	Kentucky (16–5)	North Carolina (21–6)	Indiana (20–5)	Wichita State (25–3)	Boston College (24–6)	11.
12.	Alabama	St. John's (3–0)	St. John's (5–0)	Louisville (5–1)	Arkansas (5–0)	Missouri (8–1)	Tennessee (8–1)	Iowa (9–2)	Missouri (12–2)	Arkansas (15–1)	Louisville (16–3)	Villanova (14–4)	Missouri (19–4)	Wichita State (21–3)	Wichita State (23–3)	Missouri (24–6)	Kentucky (21–7)	12.
13.	Tennessee	Alabama (1–0)	Louisville (4–1)	Arkansas (4–0)	Syracuse (8–0)	Louisville (8–1)	Louisville (8–2)	Syracuse (11–2)	Villanova (10–2)	Missouri (14–3)	Iowa (13–4)	Kentucky (14–5)	Memphis State (18–4)	Syracuse (18–5)	Missouri (22–6)	Villanova (21–6)	Villanova (22–7)	13.
14.	Houston	Tennessee (1–0)	Tennessee (2–0)	Houston (5–1)	Louisville (7–1)	Syracuse (9–0)	Villanova (6–2)	Missouri (10–2)	Houston (13–2)	Iowa (12–3)	Georgetown (15–4)	Georgetown (16–5)	Georgetown (16–6)	Memphis State (19–4)	Ohio State (18–7)	Boston College (22–5)	Wichita State (25–3)	14.
15.	Missouri	North Carolina (0–2)	Arkansas (3–0)	NC State (4–0)	NC State (4–0)	UNLV (7–0)	Missouri (9–2)	Villanova (8–2)	Syracuse (12–2)	Georgetown (13–4)	Kentucky (13–4)	Syracuse (15–5)	Wichita State (18–3)	Missouri (20–6) т	Boston College (20–5)	Georgetown (21–8)	Chattanooga (26–3)	15.
16.	NC State	Arkansas (1–0)	Marquette (2–0)	Syracuse (6–0)	West Virginia (8–0)	Villanova (4–2)	NC State (5–1)	Houston (11–2)	Minnesota (10–3)	Minnesota (12–3)	Illinois State (15–1)	Wichita State (17–3)	Iowa (15–6)	Ohio State (17–6) т	Georgetown (19–7)	Ohio State (19–8)	NC State (20–10)	16.
17.	Arkansas	Marquette (0–0)	North Carolina (2–2)	North Carolina (3–2)	UNLV (5–0)	NC State (4–1)	Georgetown (8–3)	Minnesota (10–1)	Virginia Tech (14–1)	Illinois State (14–1)	Minnesota (13–3)	Illinois State (17–2)	Syracuse (16–5)	Iowa (16–7)	Memphis State (19–5)	Memphis State (21–6)	Memphis State (22–7)	17.
18.	Marquette	NC State (1–0)	NC State (2–0) т	UNLV (5–0)	Villanova (3–2)	Houston (7–2)	North Carolina (8–3)	Tennessee (10–2)	Oklahoma State (12–1)	Syracuse (13–3)	Washington State (15–2)	Purdue (15–4)	Boston College (17–4)	Georgetown (17–7)	Syracuse (18–6)	Chattanooga (23–3)	Georgia (21–9)	18.
19.	St. John's	UNLV (1–0) т	UNLV (3–0) т	Villanova (2–2)	Houston (6–2)	Tulsa (5–1)	Houston (8–2)	NC State (7–2)	Georgetown (11–4)	Wake Forest (13–2)	Georgia (14–3)	Minnesota (14–4)	Oklahoma (18–6)	Boston College (18–5)	Chattanooga (21–3)	Oklahoma (23–7)	Oklahoma State (24–6)	19.
20.	UNLV	Oregon State (0–1) т	Purdue (4–0)	West Virginia (5–0)	Tulsa (5–1)	West Virginia (8–1)	Purdue (9–1)	Ohio State (9–2)	Auburn (10–3)	Oklahoma State (13–2)	Oklahoma State (13–2)	Iowa (13–6)	Ohio State (15–6)	Tennessee (16–7)	Purdue (18–6)	Syracuse (19–8)	Georgetown (21–9)	20.
	Preseason	Week 2 Nov. 29	Week 3 Dec. 6	Week 4 Dec. 13	Week 5 Dec. 20	Week 6 Dec. 27	Week 7 Jan. 3	Week 8 Jan. 10	Week 9 Jan. 17	Week 10 Jan. 24	Week 11 Jan. 31	Week 12 Feb. 7	Week 13 Feb. 14	Week 14 Feb. 21	Week 15 Feb. 28	Week 16 Mar. 7	Final Mar. 14	
		None	Dropped: Oregon State (1–2)	Dropped: Purdue (4–1)	Dropped: North Carolina (4–3)	None	Dropped: Tulsa (6–2); West Virginia (8–3)	Dropped: Georgetown (9–4); Purdue (9–3)	Dropped: Alabama (9–4); Tennessee (10–3); NC State (8–3); Ohio State (9–4)	Dropped: Virginia Tech (14–3); Auburn (10–5)	Dropped: Wake Forest (13–4); Oklahoma State (13–4)	Dropped: Washington State (15–4); Georgia (15–4)	Dropped: Illinois State (17–4); Purdue (15–6); Minnesota (14–6)	Dropped: Oklahoma (19–7)	Dropped: Iowa (17–8); Tennessee (17–8)	Dropped: Purdue (18–8)	Dropped: Ohio State (19–9); Oklahoma (23–8); Syracuse (19–9)	

== Coaches Poll ==
	Preseason	Week 3 Dec. 6	Week 4 Dec. 13	Week 5 Dec. 20	Week 6 Dec. 27	Week 7 Jan. 3	Week 8 Jan. 10	Week 9 Jan. 17	Week 10 Jan. 24	Week 11 Jan. 31	Week 12 Feb. 7	Week 13 Feb. 14	Week 14 Feb. 21	Week 15 Feb. 28	Week 16 Mar. 7	Final Mar. 14	
1.	Virginia	Virginia (4–0)	Virginia (6–0)	Virginia (8–0)	Indiana (8–0)	Indiana (10–0)	Memphis State (11–1)	UCLA (11–1)	UCLA (13–1)	North Carolina (17–3)	North Carolina (20–3)	Indiana (19–2)	UNLV (24–0)	Houston (23–2)	Houston (25–2)	Houston (27–2)	1.
2.	North Carolina	Kentucky (3–0)	Kentucky (5–0)	Kentucky (7–0)	Memphis State (8–0)	Memphis State (9–0)	Virginia (11–1)	Indiana (12–1)	Indiana (14–1)	Virginia (17–2)	Virginia (19–2)	UNLV (22–0)	Houston (22–2)	Virginia (23–3)	Virginia (25–3)	Louisville (29–3)	2.
3.	Georgetown	Georgetown (5–0)	UCLA (4–0)	UCLA (5–0)	Virginia (8–1)	Kentucky (8–1)	St. John's (13–0)	North Carolina (12–3) т	North Carolina (15–3)	UNLV (18–0)	UNLV (20–0)	North Carolina (21–4)	Virginia (21–3)	Louisville (24–3)	Louisville (27–3)	St. John's (27–4)	3.
4.	Kentucky	UCLA (3–0)	Memphis State (6–0)	Memphis State (7–0)	Kentucky (7–1)	Virginia (10–1)	Indiana (10–1)	Memphis State (12–1) т	Virginia (15–2)	St. John's (18–1)	Indiana (16–2)	Houston (20–2)	Indiana (20–3)	Arkansas (24–1)	UCLA (22–4)	Virginia (27–4)	4.
5.	Louisville	Memphis State (4–0)	Indiana (6–0)	Indiana (7–0)	UCLA (6–1)	Alabama (8–0)	UCLA (9–1)	Arkansas (13–0)	Memphis State (14–1)	Memphis State (16–1)	UCLA (16–2)	Virginia (19–3)	Arkansas (22–1)	Villanova (21–4)	Arkansas (25–2)	Indiana (23–5)	5.
6.	UCLA	Iowa (4–0)	Iowa (6–0)	Missouri (6–0)	Alabama (6–0)	UCLA (7–1)	Kentucky (11–2)	Virginia (12–2)	St. John's (17–1)	Indiana (15–2)	Houston (18–2)	St. John's (20–2)	Louisville (22–3)	Kentucky (20–5)	North Carolina (25–6)	UNLV (28–2)	6.
7.	Villanova т	Indiana (3–0)	Georgetown (6–1)	Alabama (5–0)	St. John's (9–0)	St. John's (10–0)	Arkansas (11–0)	St. John's (14–1)	Louisville (15–2)	UCLA (14–2)	St. John's (19–2)	Arkansas (20–1)	Villanova (19–4)	UCLA (21–3)	Indiana (22–5)	UCLA (23–5)	7.
8.	Indiana т	Missouri (2–0)	Missouri (6–0)	St. John's (9–0)	Tennessee (7–0)	Iowa (8–1)	Louisville (11–2)	Louisville (13–2)	UNLV (16–0)	Houston (16–2)	Missouri (18–3)	Louisville (21–3)	St. John's (22–3)	St. John's (23–4)	St. John's (24–4)	North Carolina (26–7)	8.
9.	Memphis State	Villanova (1–1)	Alabama (4–0)	Iowa (6–1)	Louisville (8–1)	Syracuse (10–0)	UNLV (12–0)	UNLV (14–0)	Houston (15–2)	Arkansas (17–1)	Arkansas (19–1)	Villanova (17–4)	UCLA (19–3)	Missouri (22–6)	Missouri (24–6)	Arkansas (25–3)	9.
10.	Oregon State	Houston (4–0)	St. John's (7–0)	Tennessee (6–0)	Iowa (6–1)	Louisville (8–2)	Alabama (9–2)	Iowa (10–2)	Kentucky (13–3)	Missouri (16–3)	Memphis State (18–2)	Missouri (19–4)	Kentucky (18–5)	North Carolina (23–6)	Kentucky (21–6)	Kentucky (21–7)	10.
11.	Houston	Alabama (2–0)	Louisville (5–1)	Louisville (7–1)	Syracuse (9–0)	Tennessee (8–1)	North Carolina (10–3)	Missouri (12–2)	Arkansas (15–1)	Villanova (13–3)	Louisville (19–3)	UCLA (17–3)	North Carolina (21–6)	UNLV (24–2)	UNLV (25–2)	Villanova (22–7)	11.
12.	Iowa	Louisville (4–1)	Tennessee (4–0)	Georgetown (6–2)	Missouri (8–1)	Arkansas (7–0)	Iowa (9–2)	Houston (13–2)	Villanova (12–3)	Louisville (16–3)	Kentucky (14–5)	Kentucky (16–5)	Missouri (20–6)	Indiana (20–5)	Villanova (21–6)	Missouri (26–7)	12.
13.	Alabama	St. John's (5–0)	Arkansas (4–0)	Syracuse (8–0)	Georgetown (7–2)	UNLV (10–0)	Houston (11–2)	Kentucky (11–3)	Missouri (14–3)	Iowa (13–4)	Georgetown (16–5)	Memphis State (18–4)	Memphis State (19–4)	Boston College (20–5)	Boston College (22–5)	Boston College (24–6)	13.
14.	Missouri	Tennessee (2–0)	Houston (5–1)	Arkansas (5–0)	Arkansas (6–0)	Villanova (6–2)	Syracuse (11–2)	Villanova (10–2)	Illinois State (14–1)	Illinois State (15–1)	Villanova (14–4)	Georgetown (16–6)	Syracuse (18–5)	Ohio State (18–7)	Georgetown (21–8)	NC State (20–10)	14.
15.	Tennessee	Purdue (4–0)	Syracuse (6–0)	NC State (4–0)	UNLV (7–0)	Missouri (9–2)	Missouri (10–2)	Syracuse (12–2)	Georgetown (13–4)	Kentucky (13–4)	Minnesota (14–4)	Iowa (15–6)	Ohio State (17–6)	Washington State (20–5)	Chattanooga (23–3)	Georgia (21–9)	15.
16.	Marquette	Arkansas (3–0)	North Carolina (3–2)	Villanova (3–2)	Houston (7–2)	North Carolina (8–3)	Minnesota (10–1)	Georgetown (11–4)	Iowa (12–3)	Georgetown (15–4)	Syracuse (15–5) т	Tennessee (15–7)	Boston College (18–5)	Georgetown (19–7)	Washington State (21–5)	Chattanooga (26–3)	16.
17.	DePaul	North Carolina (2–2)	NC State (4–0)	Houston (6–2)	Villanova (4–2)	Georgetown (8–3)	Villanova (8–2)	Illinois State (12–1)	Minnesota (12–3)	Washington State (15–2)	Illinois State (17–2) т	Syracuse (16–5)	Iowa (16–7)	Chattanooga (21–3)	Ohio State (19–8)	Memphis State (22–7)	17.
18.	Oklahoma	NC State (2–0)	Villanova (2–2)	UNLV (5–0)	NC State (4–1)	NC State (5–1)	Tennessee (10–2)	Minnesota (10–3)	Syracuse (13–3) т	Minnesota (13–3)	Purdue (15–4)	Boston College (17–4)	Georgetown (17–7)	Memphis State (19–5)	Memphis State (21–6)	Illinois State (24–6)	18.
19.	St. John's	Marquette (2–0)	UNLV (5–0)	San Diego State (6–0)	Louisiana-Lafayette (8–0)	Houston (8–2)	NC State (7–2)	Oklahoma State (12–1)	Washington State (13–2) т	Oklahoma (16–4)	Georgia (15–4)	Chattanooga (17–3)	Chattanooga (19–3)	Oklahoma (20–7)	Oklahoma (23–7)	Oklahoma State (24–6)	19.
20.	Arkansas	DePaul (3–1)	Minnesota (5–0)	West Virginia (8–0)	Tulsa (5–1)	Minnesota (7–1)	Illinois State (10–1)	NC State (8–3); Tennessee (10–3)	Wake Forest (13–2)	Auburn (12–5)	Tennessee (14–5)	Oklahoma State (17–4)	Tennessee (16–7)	Iowa (17–8)	Illinois State (21–6)	Georgetown (21–9)	20.
	Preseason	Week 3 Dec. 6	Week 4 Dec. 13	Week 5 Dec. 20	Week 6 Dec. 27	Week 7 Jan. 3	Week 8 Jan. 10	Week 9 Jan. 17	Week 10 Jan. 24	Week 11 Jan. 31	Week 12 Feb. 7	Week 13 Feb. 14	Week 14 Feb. 21	Week 15 Feb. 28	Week 16 Mar. 7	Final Mar. 14	
		Dropped: Oregon State (1–2); Oklahoma (2–2)	Dropped: Purdue (5–1); Marquette (3–1); DePaul (4–2)	Dropped: North Carolina (4–3); Minnesota	Dropped: West Virginia (8–1); San Diego State (6–1)	Dropped: Louisiana-Lafayette (8–2); Tulsa (6–2)	Dropped: Georgetown (9–4)	Dropped: Alabama (9–4)	Dropped: Oklahoma State (13–2); NC State (9–4); Tennessee (10–5)	Dropped: Syracuse (13–4); Wake Forest (13–4)	Dropped: Iowa (13–6); Washington State (15–4); Oklahoma (16–6); Auburn (12–6)	Dropped: Minnesota (14–6); Illinois State (17–4); Purdue (15–6); Georgia (15–6)	Dropped: Oklahoma State (17–6)	Dropped: Syracuse (18–6); Tennessee (17–8)	Dropped: Iowa (17–9)	Dropped: Washington State (21–7); Ohio State (19–9); Oklahoma (23–8)	
