= 1986–87 NCAA Division I men's basketball season =

Men's basketball season

- Preseason AP No. 1: North Carolina Tar Heels
- NCAA Tournament: 1987
- Tournament dates: March 12 – 30, 1987
- National Championship: Louisiana Superdome; New Orleans, Louisiana
- NCAA Champions: Indiana Hoosiers
- Other champions: Southern Miss Golden Eagles (NIT)
- Player of the Year (Naismith, Wooden): David Robinson, Navy Midshipmen

The 1986–87 NCAA Division I men's basketball season began in November 1986 and ended with the Final Four in New Orleans on March 30, 1987.

== Season headlines ==
- All NCAA tournament teams were subject to drug testing for the first time.

== Major rule changes ==
Beginning in 1986–87, the following rules changes were implemented:

- The three-point field goal was introduced and set at 19 feet 9 inches (6.02 m) from the center of the basket.
- A television replay could be used to prevent or rectify a scorer’s or timer’s mistake or a malfunction of the clock.

== Season outlook ==
=== Pre-season polls ===
The top 20 from the AP Poll during the pre-season.

Associated Press
Ranking	Team
1	North Carolina
2	Louisville
3	Indiana
4	Purdue
5	UNLV
6	Georgia Tech
7	Oklahoma
8	Kansas
9	Navy
10	Iowa
11	Kentucky
12	Auburn
13	Alabama
14	Illinois
15	Syracuse
16	Pittsburgh
17	NC State
18	Georgetown
19	Arizona
20	Cleveland State

== Conference membership changes ==
School	Former conference	New conference
Central Connecticut State Blue Devils	Division II independent	Division I independent
Florida A&M Rattlers	Division I independent	Mid-Eastern Athletic Conference
UMBC Retrievers	Division II independent	Division I independent
Northern Illinois Huskies	Mid-American Conference	Division I independent
Texas–San Antonio Roadrunners	Division I independent	Trans America Athletic Conference
West Texas State Buffaloes	Missouri Valley Conference	Lone Star Conference (D-II)

== Regular season ==
=== Conferences ===
==== Conference winners and tournaments ====
Conference	Regular season winner	Conference player of the year	Conference Coach of the Year	Conference tournament	Tournament venue (City)	Tournament winner
AMCU–8	Southwest Missouri State	Winston Garland, Southwest Missouri State	Charlie Spoonhour, Southwest Missouri State	1987 AMCU-8 men's basketball tournament	Hammons Student Center (Springfield, Missouri)	Southwest Missouri State
Atlantic 10 Conference	Temple	Nate Blackwell, Temple	John Chaney, Temple	1987 Atlantic 10 men's basketball tournament	McGonigle Hall (Philadelphia, Pennsylvania)	Temple
Atlantic Coast Conference	North Carolina	Horace Grant, Clemson	Cliff Ellis, Clemson	1987 ACC men's basketball tournament	Capital Centre (Landover, Maryland)	NC State
Big East Conference	Georgetown, Pittsburgh & Syracuse	Reggie Williams, Georgetown	John Thompson, Georgetown	1987 Big East men's basketball tournament	Madison Square Garden (New York City, New York)	Georgetown
Big Eight Conference	Missouri	Danny Manning, Kansas	Norm Stewart, Missouri	1987 Big Eight Conference men's basketball tournament	Kemper Arena (Kansas City, Missouri) (Semifinals and Finals)	Missouri
Big Sky Conference	Montana State	Tom Domako, Montana State	Bobby Dye, Boise State & Jim Boutin, Idaho State	1987 Big Sky Conference men's basketball tournament	Walkup Skydome (Flagstaff, Arizona)	Idaho State
Big South Conference	Baptist	Clarence Grier, Campbell	Billy Lee, Campbell	1987 Big South Conference men's basketball tournament	Savannah Civic Center (Savannah, Georgia)	Baptist
Big Ten Conference	Indiana & Purdue	Dennis Hopson, Ohio State	Tom Davis, Iowa	No Tournament		
Colonial Athletic Association	Navy	David Robinson, Navy	John Thurston, James Madison	1987 CAA men's basketball tournament	Hampton Coliseum (Hampton, Virginia)	Navy
East Coast Conference	Bucknell	Daren Queenan, Lehigh & Ron Simpson, Rider	Charlie Woollum, Bucknell	1987 East Coast Conference men's basketball tournament	Towson Center (Towson, Maryland)	Bucknell
ECAC Metro	Marist	Rik Smits, Marist	Dave Magarity, Marist	1987 ECAC Metro men's basketball tournament	McCann Field House (Poughkeepsie, New York)	Marist
ECAC North	Northeastern	Reggie Lewis, Northeastern	Karl Fogel, Northeastern	1987 ECAC North men's basketball tournament	Matthews Arena (Boston, Massachusetts)	Northeastern
Ivy League	Penn	Perry Bromwell, Penn	None selected	No Tournament		
Metro Atlantic Athletic Conference	Saint Peter's	Kevin Houston, Army	Ted Fiore, Saint Peter's	1987 MAAC men's basketball tournament	Meadowlands Arena (East Rutherford, New Jersey)	Fairfield
Metro Conference	Louisville	Herbert Crook, Louisville	Larry Finch, Memphis State	1987 Metro Conference men's basketball tournament	Freedom Hall (Louisville, Kentucky)	Memphis State
Mid-American Conference	Central Michigan	Booker James, Western Michigan	Charlie Coles, Central Michigan	1987 MAC men's basketball tournament	Centennial Hall (Toledo, Ohio)	Central Michigan
Mid-Eastern Athletic Conference	Howard	George Cale, North Carolina A&T	A. B. Williamson, Howard	1987 MEAC men's basketball tournament	Greensboro Coliseum (Greensboro, North Carolina)	North Carolina A&T
Midwestern Collegiate Conference	Evansville & Loyola (IL)	Andre Moore, Loyola (IL)	Jim Crews, Evansville	1987 Midwestern Collegiate Conference men's basketball tournament	Market Square Arena (Indianapolis, Indiana)	Xavier
Missouri Valley Conference	Tulsa	Hersey Hawkins, Bradley	Eddie Fogler, Wichita State	1987 Missouri Valley Conference men's basketball tournament	Tulsa Convention Center (Tulsa, Oklahoma)	Wichita State
Ohio Valley Conference	Middle Tennessee State	Bob McCann, Morehead State	Max Good, Eastern Kentucky	1987 Ohio Valley Conference men's basketball tournament	Murphy Center (Murfreesboro, Tennessee)	Austin Peay
Pacific-10 Conference	UCLA	José Ortiz, Oregon State	Walt Hazzard, UCLA	1987 Pacific-10 Conference men's basketball tournament	Pauley Pavilion (Los Angeles, California)	UCLA
Pacific Coast Athletic Association	UNLV	Armon Gilliam, UNLV	Jerry Tarkanian, UNLV	1987 Pacific Coast Athletic Association men's basketball tournament	The Forum (Inglewood, California)	UNLV
Southeastern Conference	Alabama	Derrick McKey, Alabama	Wimp Sanderson, Alabama	1987 SEC men's basketball tournament	Omni Coliseum (Atlanta, Georgia)	Alabama
Southern Conference	Marshall	Gay Elmore, VMI	Butch Estes, Furman	1987 Southern Conference men's basketball tournament	Asheville Civic Center (Asheville, North Carolina)	Marshall
Southland Conference	Louisiana Tech	Jerome Batiste, McNeese State	Tommy Joe Eagles, Louisiana Tech	1987 Southland Conference men's basketball tournament	Thomas Assembly Center (Ruston, Louisiana)	Louisiana Tech
Southwest Conference	TCU	Carven Holcombe, TCU	Jim Killingsworth, TCU	1987 Southwest Conference men's basketball tournament	Reunion Arena (Dallas, Texas)	Texas A&M
Southwestern Athletic Conference	Grambling State	George Ivory, Mississippi Valley State & Avery Johnson, Southern	Bob Hopkins, Grambling State	1987 SWAC men's basketball tournament		Southern
Sun Belt Conference	Western Kentucky	Tellis Frank, Western Kentucky	Murray Arnold, Western Kentucky	1987 Sun Belt Conference men's basketball tournament	E. A. Diddle Arena (Bowling Green, Kentucky)	UAB
Trans America Athletic Conference	Arkansas–Little Rock	Brian Newton, Georgia Southern	Frank Kerns, Georgia Southern	1987 TAAC men's basketball tournament	Barton Coliseum (Little Rock, Arkansas)	Georgia Southern
West Coast Athletic Conference	San Diego	Scott Thompson, San Diego	Hank Egan, San Diego	1987 West Coast Athletic Conference men's basketball tournament	War Memorial Gymnasium (San Francisco, California)	Santa Clara
Western Athletic Conference	UTEP	Fennis Dembo, Wyoming	Don Haskins, UTEP	1987 WAC men's basketball tournament	The Pit (Albuquerque, New Mexico)	Wyoming

==== Conference standings ====
1986–87 AMCU-8 Conference men's basketball standings
	Conf.				Overall
Team	W		L	PCT	W		L	PCT
Southwest Missouri State †	13	–	1	.929	28	–	6	.824
Cleveland State	10	–	4	.714	25	–	8	.758
Illinois–Chicago	9	–	5	.643	17	–	15	.531
Wisconsin–Green Bay	8	–	6	.571	15	–	14	.517
Northern Iowa	7	–	7	.500	13	–	15	.464
Valparaiso	4	–	10	.286	12	–	16	.429
Eastern Illinois	3	–	11	.214	9	–	19	.321
Western Illinois	2	–	12	.143	12	–	16	.429
† 1987 AMCU-8 tournament winner

1986–87 ACC men's basketball standings
	Conf.				Overall
Team	W		L	PCT	W		L	PCT
No. 2 North Carolina	14	–	0	1.000	32	–	4	.889
No. 13 Clemson	10	–	4	.714	25	–	6	.806
No. 17 Duke	9	–	5	.643	24	–	9	.727
Virginia	8	–	6	.571	21	–	10	.677
Georgia Tech	7	–	7	.500	16	–	13	.552
NC State †	6	–	8	.429	20	–	14	.588
Wake Forest	2	–	12	.143	14	–	15	.483
Maryland	0	–	14	.000	9	–	17	.346
† 1987 ACC tournament winner Rankings from AP Poll

1986–87 Atlantic 10 men's basketball standings
	Conf.				Overall
Team	W		L	PCT	W		L	PCT
No. 8 Temple †	17	–	1	.944	32	–	4	.889
West Virginia	15	–	3	.833	23	–	8	.742
Rhode Island	12	–	6	.667	20	–	10	.667
Penn State	9	–	9	.500	15	–	12	.556
Saint Joseph's	9	–	9	.500	16	–	13	.552
Duquesne	7	–	11	.389	12	–	17	.414
UMass	7	–	11	.389	11	–	16	.407
George Washington	6	–	12	.333	10	–	19	.345
Rutgers	5	–	13	.278	8	–	20	.286
St. Bonaventure	3	–	15	.167	5	–	23	.179
† 1987 Atlantic 10 Tournament winner Rankings from AP Poll

1986–87 Big East men's basketball standings
	Conf.				Overall
Team	W		L	PCT	W		L	PCT
No. 4 Georgetown†	12	–	4	.750	29	–	5	.853
No. 12 Pittsburgh	12	–	4	.750	25	–	8	.758
No. 10 Syracuse	12	–	4	.750	31	–	7	.816
Providence	10	–	6	.625	25	–	9	.735
St. John's	10	–	6	.625	21	–	9	.700
Villanova	6	–	10	.375	15	–	16	.484
Seton Hall	4	–	12	.250	15	–	14	.517
Boston College	3	–	13	.188	11	–	18	.379
Connecticut	3	–	13	.188	9	–	19	.321
† 1987 Big East tournament winner As of March 30, 1987; Rankings from AP Poll

1986–87 Big Eight Conference men's basketball standings
	Conf.				Overall
Team	W		L	PCT	W		L	PCT
No. 14 Missouri †	11	–	3	.786	24	–	10	.706
No. 20 Kansas	9	–	5	.643	25	–	11	.694
Oklahoma	9	–	5	.643	24	–	10	.706
Kansas State	8	–	6	.571	20	–	11	.645
Nebraska	7	–	7	.500	21	–	12	.636
Iowa State	5	–	9	.357	13	–	15	.464
Oklahoma State	4	–	10	.286	8	–	20	.286
Colorado	3	–	11	.214	9	–	19	.321
† 1987 Big Eight tournament winner Rankings from AP poll

1986–87 Big Sky men's basketball standings
	Conf.				Overall
Team	W		L	PCT	W		L	PCT
Montana State	12	–	2	.857	21	–	8	.724
Boise State	10	–	4	.714	22	–	8	.733
Montana	8	–	6	.571	18	–	11	.621
Nevada	7	–	7	.500	15	–	15	.500
Northern Arizona	5	–	9	.357	11	–	17	.393
Idaho	5	–	9	.357	16	–	14	.533
Idaho State †	5	–	9	.357	15	–	16	.484
Weber State	4	–	10	.286	7	–	22	.241
† Conference tournament winner

1986–87 Big South Conference men's basketball standings
	Conf.				Overall
Team	W		L	PCT	W		L	PCT
Baptist †	12	–	2	.857	21	–	9	.700
Campbell	10	–	4	.714	17	–	13	.567
UNC Asheville	5	–	3	.625	15	–	11	.577
Radford	7	–	7	.500	17	–	14	.548
Winthrop	1	–	7	.125	8	–	20	.286
Coastal Carolina	4	–	4	.500	12	–	16	.429
Armstrong State	2	–	6	.250	6	–	22	.214
Augusta State	3	–	11	.214	8	–	19	.296
† 1987 Big South tournament winner Rankings from AP Poll

1986–87 Big Ten Conference men's basketball standings
	Conf.				Overall
Team	W		L	PCT	W		L	PCT
No. 3 Indiana	15	–	3	.833	30	–	4	.882
No. 7 Purdue	15	–	3	.833	25	–	5	.833
No. 6 Iowa	14	–	4	.778	30	–	5	.857
No. 11 Illinois	13	–	5	.722	23	–	8	.742
Michigan	10	–	8	.556	20	–	12	.625
Ohio State	9	–	9	.500	20	–	13	.606
Michigan State	6	–	12	.333	11	–	17	.393
Wisconsin	4	–	14	.222	14	–	17	.452
Minnesota	2	–	16	.111	9	–	19	.321
Northwestern	2	–	16	.111	7	–	21	.250
As of March 30, 1987; Rankings from AP Poll

1986–87 CAA men's basketball standings
	Conf.				Overall
Team	W		L	PCT	W		L	PCT
Navy †	13	–	1	.929	26	–	6	.813
UNC Wilmington	9	–	5	.643	18	–	12	.600
Richmond	8	–	6	.571	15	–	14	.517
James Madison	8	–	6	.571	20	–	10	.667
George Mason	7	–	7	.500	15	–	13	.536
American	5	–	9	.357	13	–	14	.481
East Carolina	4	–	10	.286	12	–	16	.429
William & Mary	2	–	12	.143	5	–	22	.185
† 1987 CAA tournament winner Rankings from AP Poll

1986–87 East Coast Conference men's basketball standings
	Conf.				Overall
Team	W		L	PCT	W		L	PCT
Bucknell †	11	–	3	.786	22	–	9	.710
Lafayette	10	–	4	.714	16	–	13	.552
Rider	8	–	6	.571	12	–	16	.429
Lehigh	8	–	6	.571	15	–	14	.517
Drexel	7	–	7	.500	14	–	14	.500
Towson State	5	–	9	.357	14	–	16	.467
Hofstra	4	–	10	.286	9	–	19	.321
Delaware	3	–	11	.214	12	–	16	.429
† 1987 ECC tournament winner Rankings from AP poll

1986–87 ECAC Metro men's basketball standings
	Conf.				Overall
Team	W		L	PCT	W		L	PCT
Marist †	15	–	1	.938	20	–	10	.667
Fairleigh Dickinson	11	–	5	.688	19	–	10	.655
Loyola (MD)	10	–	6	.625	15	–	14	.517
Wagner	8	–	8	.500	16	–	13	.552
Robert Morris	7	–	9	.438	13	–	14	.481
St. Francis (PA)	7	–	9	.438	11	–	16	.407
Long Island	5	–	11	.313	13	–	14	.481
St. Francis (NY)	5	–	11	.313	11	–	16	.407
Monmouth	4	–	12	.250	8	–	19	.296
† 1987 ECAC Metro tournament winner Rankings from AP Poll

1986–87 ECAC North men's basketball standings
	Conf.				Overall
Team	W		L	PCT	W		L	PCT
Northeastern †	17	–	1	.944	27	–	7	.794
Niagara	14	–	4	.778	21	–	10	.677
Boston University	12	–	6	.667	18	–	12	.600
Canisius	12	–	6	.667	16	–	12	.571
Siena	12	–	6	.667	17	–	12	.586
Hartford	8	–	10	.444	14	–	14	.500
Maine	6	–	12	.333	10	–	18	.357
Vermont	3	–	15	.167	5	–	23	.179
New Hampshire	3	–	15	.167	4	–	24	.143
Colgate	3	–	15	.167	4	–	23	.148
† 1987 ECAC North tournament winner Rankings from AP Poll

1986–87 Gulf Star Conference men's basketball standings
	Conf.				Overall
Team	W		L	PCT	W		L	PCT
Stephen F. Austin	10	–	0	1.000	22	–	8	.733
Sam Houston State	6	–	4	.600	16	–	12	.571
Southwest Texas State	5	–	5	.500	13	–	15	.464
Northwestern State	4	–	6	.400	15	–	13	.536
Southeastern Louisiana	4	–	6	.400	10	–	21	.323
Nicholls State	1	–	9	.100	9	–	18	.333
Rankings from AP Poll

1986–87 Ivy League men's basketball standings
	Conf.				Overall
Team	W		L	PCT	W		L	PCT
Penn	10	–	4	.714	13	–	14	.481
Princeton	9	–	5	.643	16	–	9	.640
Cornell	9	–	5	.643	15	–	11	.577
Dartmouth	7	–	7	.500	15	–	11	.577
Yale	7	–	7	.500	14	–	12	.538
Columbia	6	–	8	.429	12	–	14	.462
Harvard	4	–	10	.286	9	–	17	.346
Brown	4	–	10	.286	9	–	18	.333
Rankings from AP Poll

1986–87 MAAC men's basketball standings
	Conf.				Overall
Team	W		L	PCT	W		L	PCT
Saint Peter's	11	–	3	.786	21	–	8	.724
La Salle	10	–	4	.714	20	–	13	.606
Army	8	–	6	.571	14	–	15	.483
Iona	8	–	6	.571	16	–	14	.533
Holy Cross	6	–	8	.429	9	–	19	.321
Fordham	6	–	8	.429	14	–	16	.467
Fairfield †	5	–	9	.357	15	–	16	.484
Manhattan	2	–	12	.143	6	–	21	.222
† 1987 MAAC tournament winner Rankings from AP Poll

1986–87 Metro Conference men's basketball standings
	Conf.				Overall
Team	W		L	PCT	W		L	PCT
Louisville	9	–	3	.750	18	–	14	.563
Memphis State †	8	–	4	.667	26	–	8	.765
Southern Miss	6	–	6	.500	23	–	11	.676
Florida State	6	–	6	.500	19	–	11	.633
South Carolina	5	–	7	.417	15	–	14	.517
Virginia Tech	5	–	7	.417	10	–	18	.357
Cincinnati	3	–	9	.250	12	–	16	.429
† 1987 Metro Conference tournament winner Rankings from AP Poll

1986–87 Mid-American Conference men's basketball standings
	Conf.				Overall
Team	W		L	PCT	W		L	PCT
Central Michigan†	14	–	2	.875	22	–	8	.733
Kent State	11	–	5	.688	19	–	10	.655
Bowling Green	10	–	6	.625	15	–	14	.517
Eastern Michigan	8	–	8	.500	14	–	15	.483
Miami	7	–	9	.438	14	–	14	.500
Ohio	7	–	9	.438	14	–	14	.500
Western Michigan	7	–	9	.438	12	–	16	.429
Toledo	4	–	12	.250	11	–	17	.393
Ball State	4	–	12	.250	9	–	18	.333
† Mid-American Conference tournament winner Rankings from AP Poll

1986–87 MEAC men's basketball standings
	Conf.				Overall
Team	W		L	PCT	W		L	PCT
Howard	13	–	1	.929	24	–	4	.857
North Carolina A&T †	12	–	2	.857	24	–	6	.800
South Carolina State	9	–	5	.643	14	–	15	.483
Coppin State	7	–	6	.538	8	–	19	.296
Bethune–Cookman	6	–	8	.429	10	–	19	.345
Morgan State	5	–	9	.357	8	–	20	.286
Delaware State	3	–	11	.214	4	–	24	.143
Maryland Eastern Shore	0	–	13	.000	2	–	24	.077
Florida A&M		–		–	12	–	16	.429
† 1987 MEAC tournament winner Rankings from AP Poll

1986–87 Midwestern Collegiate Conference men's basketball standings
	Conf.				Overall
Team	W		L	PCT	W		L	PCT
Evansville	8	–	4	.667	16	–	12	.571
Loyola (IL)	8	–	4	.667	16	–	13	.552
Xavier †	7	–	5	.583	19	–	13	.594
Saint Louis	7	–	5	.583	25	–	10	.714
Oral Roberts	5	–	7	.417	10	–	18	.357
Butler	2	–	10	.167	9	–	19	.321
Detroit Mercy	2	–	10	.167	7	–	21	.250
† 1987 MCC tournament winner

1986–87 Missouri Valley Conference men's basketball standings
	Conf.				Overall
Team	W		L	PCT	W		L	PCT
Tulsa	11	–	3	.786	22	–	8	.733
Bradley	10	–	4	.714	17	–	12	.586
Wichita State †	9	–	5	.643	22	–	11	.667
Illinois State	7	–	7	.500	19	–	13	.594
Drake	6	–	8	.429	17	–	14	.548
Southern Illinois	5	–	9	.357	12	–	17	.414
Indiana State	4	–	10	.286	9	–	20	.310
Creighton	4	–	10	.286	9	–	19	.321
† 1987 MVC tournament winner Rankings from AP Poll

1986–87 Ohio Valley Conference men's basketball standings
	Conf.				Overall
Team	W		L	PCT	W		L	PCT
Middle Tennessee	11	–	3	.786	22	–	7	.759
Akron	9	–	5	.643	21	–	9	.700
Eastern Kentucky	9	–	5	.643	19	–	11	.633
Austin Peay †	8	–	6	.571	14	–	14	.500
Morehead State	8	–	6	.571	14	–	14	.500
Murray State	6	–	8	.429	13	–	15	.464
Youngstown State	4	–	10	.286	11	–	17	.393
Tennessee Tech	1	–	13	.071	7	–	20	.259
† 1987 OVC tournament winner Rankings from AP poll

1986–87 Pacific-10 Conference men's basketball standings
	Conf.				Overall
Team	W		L	PCT	W		L	PCT
No. 15 UCLA †	14	–	4	.778	25	–	7	.781
Arizona	13	–	5	.722	18	–	12	.600
Washington	10	–	8	.556	20	–	15	.571
California	10	–	8	.556	20	–	15	.571
Oregon State	10	–	8	.556	19	–	11	.633
Stanford	9	–	9	.500	15	–	13	.536
Oregon	8	–	10	.444	16	–	14	.533
Arizona State	6	–	12	.333	11	–	17	.393
Washington State	6	–	12	.333	10	–	18	.357
USC	4	–	14	.222	9	–	19	.321
† 1987 Pacific-10 Tournament winner As of March 25, 1987; Rankings from AP poll

1986–87 PCAA men's basketball standings
	Conf.				Overall
Team	W		L	PCT	W		L	PCT
No. 1 UNLV †	18	–	0	1.000	37	–	2	.949
UC Santa Barbara	10	–	8	.556	16	–	12	.571
San Jose State	10	–	8	.556	16	–	14	.533
Cal State Fullerton	9	–	9	.500	17	–	13	.567
New Mexico State	9	–	9	.500	15	–	15	.500
UC Irvine	9	–	9	.500	14	–	14	.500
Utah State	8	–	10	.444	15	–	16	.484
Long Beach State	7	–	11	.389	10	–	17	.370
Pacific	6	–	12	.333	10	–	17	.370
Fresno State	4	–	14	.222	9	–	20	.310
† 1987 PCAA tournament winner Rankings from AP poll

1986–87 Southeastern Conference men's basketball standings
	Conf.				Overall
Team	W		L	PCT	W		L	PCT
No. 9 Alabama †	16	–	2	.889	28	–	5	.848
Florida	12	–	6	.667	23	–	11	.676
Georgia	10	–	8	.556	18	–	12	.600
Kentucky	10	–	8	.556	18	–	11	.621
Auburn	9	–	9	.500	18	–	13	.581
Ole Miss	8	–	10	.444	15	–	14	.517
LSU	8	–	10	.444	24	–	15	.615
Tennessee	7	–	11	.389	14	–	15	.483
Vanderbilt	7	–	11	.389	18	–	16	.529
Mississippi State	3	–	15	.167	7	–	21	.250
† 1987 SEC tournament winner Rankings from AP Poll

1986–87 Southern Conference men's basketball standings
	Conf.				Overall
Team	W		L	PCT	W		L	PCT
Marshall †	15	–	1	.938	25	–	6	.806
Chattanooga	14	–	2	.875	21	–	8	.724
Davidson	12	–	4	.750	20	–	10	.667
Furman	10	–	6	.625	17	–	12	.586
The Citadel	6	–	10	.375	13	–	15	.464
VMI	5	–	11	.313	11	–	17	.393
Western Carolina	4	–	12	.250	10	–	19	.345
Appalachian State	3	–	13	.188	7	–	21	.250
East Tennessee State	3	–	13	.188	7	–	21	.250
† 1987 Southern Conference tournament winner As of April 30, 1987; Rankings from AP poll

1986–87 Southland Conference men's basketball standings
	Conf.				Overall
Team	W		L	PCT	W		L	PCT
Louisiana Tech †	9	–	1	.900	22	–	8	.733
Arkansas State	5	–	5	.500	21	–	13	.618
McNeese State	5	–	5	.500	14	–	14	.500
Lamar	4	–	6	.400	14	–	15	.483
North Texas State	4	–	6	.400	11	–	17	.393
Northeast Louisiana	3	–	7	.300	13	–	15	.464
UT Arlington		–		–	12	–	18	.400
† 1987 Southland Conference tournament winner Rankings from AP Poll

1986–87 Southwest Conference men's basketball standings
	Conf.				Overall
Team	W		L	PCT	W		L	PCT
No. 19 TCU	14	–	2	.875	24	–	7	.774
Baylor	10	–	6	.625	18	–	13	.581
Houston	9	–	7	.563	18	–	12	.600
Texas Tech	9	–	7	.563	15	–	14	.517
Arkansas	8	–	8	.500	19	–	14	.576
SMU	7	–	9	.438	16	–	13	.552
Texas	7	–	9	.438	14	–	17	.452
Texas A&M †	6	–	10	.375	17	–	14	.548
Rice	2	–	14	.125	8	–	19	.296
† 1987 SWC tournament winner Rankings from AP Poll

1986–87 SWAC men's basketball standings
	Conf.				Overall
Team	W		L	PCT	W		L	PCT
Grambling	11	–	3	.786	16	–	14	.533
Southern †	9	–	5	.643	19	–	12	.613
Mississippi Valley State	9	–	5	.643	13	–	15	.464
Jackson State	8	–	6	.571	15	–	14	.517
Alabama State	7	–	7	.500	14	–	14	.500
Texas Southern	7	–	7	.500	11	–	11	.500
Alcorn State	8	–	6	.571	15	–	14	.517
Prairie View A&M	8	–	6	.571	15	–	14	.517
† 1987 SWAC tournament winner Rankings from AP Poll

1986–87 Sun Belt Conference men's basketball standings
	Conf.				Overall
Team	W		L	PCT	W		L	PCT
Western Kentucky	12	–	2	.857	29	–	9	.763
Jacksonville	11	–	3	.786	19	–	11	.633
UAB †	10	–	4	.714	21	–	11	.656
Virginia Commonwealth	7	–	7	.500	17	–	14	.548
UNC Charlotte	6	–	8	.429	18	–	14	.563
South Alabama	6	–	8	.429	14	–	14	.500
South Florida	3	–	11	.214	8	–	20	.286
Old Dominion	1	–	13	.071	6	–	22	.214
† 1987 Sun Belt Conference tournament winner Rankings from AP Poll

1986–87 Trans America Athletic Conference men's basketball standings
	Conf.				Overall
Team	W		L	PCT	W		L	PCT
Arkansas–Little Rock	16	–	2	.889	26	–	11	.703
Houston Baptist	13	–	5	.722	18	–	11	.621
Stetson	13	–	5	.722	18	–	13	.581
Georgia Southern †	12	–	6	.667	20	–	11	.645
Hardin–Simmons	9	–	9	.500	13	–	15	.464
Texas–San Antonio	7	–	11	.389	13	–	15	.464
Mercer	7	–	11	.389	12	–	16	.429
Georgia State	7	–	11	.389	11	–	17	.393
Centenary	5	–	13	.278	10	–	17	.370
Samford	1	–	17	.056	4	–	22	.154
† 1987 TAAC tournament winner Rankings from AP Poll

1986–87 West Coast Athletic Conference men's basketball standings
	Conf.				Overall
Team	W		L	PCT	W		L	PCT
San Diego	13	–	1	.929	24	–	6	.800
Gonzaga	9	–	5	.643	18	–	10	.643
Saint Mary's	7	–	7	.500	17	–	13	.567
Portland	6	–	8	.429	14	–	14	.500
Santa Clara †	6	–	8	.429	18	–	14	.563
San Francisco	6	–	8	.429	16	–	12	.571
Pepperdine	5	–	9	.357	12	–	18	.400
Loyola Marymount	4	–	10	.286	12	–	16	.429
† Conference tournament winner Rankings from AP poll

1986–87 WAC men's basketball standings
	Conf.				Overall
Team	W		L	PCT	W		L	PCT
UTEP	13	–	3	.813	25	–	7	.781
Brigham Young	12	–	4	.750	21	–	11	.656
New Mexico	11	–	5	.688	25	–	10	.714
Wyoming †	11	–	5	.688	24	–	10	.706
Utah	9	–	7	.563	17	–	13	.567
Colorado State	7	–	9	.438	13	–	16	.448
Air Force	5	–	11	.313	12	–	15	.444
Hawaii	2	–	14	.125	7	–	21	.250
San Diego State	2	–	14	.125	5	–	25	.167
† 1987 WAC tournament winner Rankings from AP Poll

=== Division I independents ===
A total of 18 college teams played as Division I independents. Among them, DePaul (28–3) had both the best winning percentage (.903) and the most wins.

1986–87 NCAA Division I men's basketball independents standings
	Conf.				Overall
Team	W		L	PCT	W		L	PCT
No. 5 DePaul	-	–	-	–	28	–	3	.903
No. 16 New Orleans	-	–	-	–	26	–	4	.867
No. 18 Notre Dame	-	–	-	–	24	–	8	.750
Texas–Pan American	-	–	-	–	16	–	12	.571
Tennessee State	-	–	-	–	15	–	12	.556
Marquette	-	–	-	–	16	–	13	.552
Miami (FL)	-	–	-	–	15	–	16	.484
Dayton	-	–	-	–	13	–	15	.464
Central Florida	-	–	-	–	12	–	15	.444
UMBC	-	–	-	–	12	–	15	.444
Chicago State	-	–	-	–	11	–	17	.393
Southwestern Louisiana	-	–	-	–	11	–	17	.393
U.S. International	-	–	-	–	11	–	17	.393
Utica	-	–	-	–	10	–	16	.385
Brooklyn	-	–	-	–	10	–	18	.357
Northern Illinois	-	–	-	–	9	–	19	.321
Central Connecticut State	-	–	-	–	8	–	21	.276
Eastern Washington	-	–	-	–	5	–	23	.179
Rankings from AP Poll

=== Informal championships ===
Conference	Regular season winner	Most Valuable Player
Philadelphia Big 5	Temple	Nate Blackwell, Temple

Temple finished with a 4–0 record in head-to-head competition among the Philadelphia Big 5.

=== Statistical leaders ===
Points per game			Rebounds per game			Assists per game			Steals per game		
Player	School	PPG	Player	School	RPG	Player	School	APG	Player	School	SPG
Kevin Houston	Army	32.9	Jerome Lane	Pittsburgh	13.5	Avery Johnson	Southern	10.7	Tony Fairley	Baptist	4.1
Dennis Hopson	Ohio St.	29.0	Chris Dudley	Yale	13.3	Mark Wade	UNLV	10.7	Doug Usitalo	Boise St.	3.5
David Robinson	Navy	28.2	Andre Moore	Loyola (IL)	12.4	Tony Fairley	Baptist	9.6	Joe Jeter	Delaware St.	3.4
Terrance Bailey	Wagner	28.1	David Robinson	Navy	11.8	Tyrone Bogues	Wake Forest	9.5	Roderick Ford	UT Arlington	3.4
Hersey Hawkins	Bradley	27.2	Brian Rowsom	UNC Wilmington	11.5	Andre Van Drost	Wagner	9.3	Duane Washington	Middle Tenn. St.	3.2

Blocked shots per game			Field goal percentage			Three-point field goal percentage			Free throw percentage		
Player	School	BPG	Player	School	FG%	Player	School	3FG%	Player	School	FT%
David Robinson	Navy	4.5	Alan Williams	Princeton	70.3	Reginald Jones	Prairie View	57.1	Kevin Houston	Army	91.2
Derrick Lewis	Maryland	4.4	Tyrone Howard	E. Kentucky	67.8	Eric Rhodes	SF Austin	54.7	Daryl Johnson	Michigan St.	91.0
Lester Fonville	Jackson St.	3.9	Horace Grant	Clemson	65.6	Anthony Davis	George Mason	53.6	Scott Haffner	Evansville	90.9
Dallas Comegys	DePaul	3.5	Robert Godbolt	Louisiana Tech	64.7	Scott Dimak	SF Austin	53.5	Nate Blackwell	Temple	90.4
Tim Perry	Temple	3.2	Claude Williams	NC A&T	63.7	Steve Alford	Indiana	53.0	Michael Smith	BYU	90.4

== Postseason tournaments ==
=== NCAA tournament ===
==== Final Four - Louisiana Superdome, New Orleans, Louisiana ====
National semifinals
E2	Syracuse	77
S6	Providence	63
M1	Indiana	97
W1	UNLV	93

National championship game
E2	Syracuse	73
M1	Indiana	74

=== National Invitation tournament ===
==== NIT Semifinals and Final ====
Semifinals (March 24)
La Salle	92
Arkansas–Little Rock	73
Southern Miss	82
Nebraska	75

Finals (March 26)
La Salle	80
Southern Miss	84

Third place game
Arkansas–Little Rock	67
Nebraska	76

== Award winners ==
=== Consensus All-American teams ===
Consensus First Team
Player	Position	Class	Team
Steve Alford	G	Senior	Indiana
Danny Manning	F	Junior	Kansas
David Robinson	C	Senior	Navy
Kenny Smith	G	Senior	North Carolina
Reggie Williams	F	Senior	Georgetown

Consensus Second Team
Player	Position	Class	Team
Armon Gilliam	F	Senior	UNLV
Horace Grant	F/C	Senior	Clemson
Dennis Hopson	G	Senior	Ohio State
Mark Jackson	G	Senior	St. John's
Ken Norman	F	Senior	Illinois

=== Major player of the year awards ===
- Wooden Award: David Robinson, Navy
- Naismith Award: David Robinson, Navy
- Associated Press Player of the Year: David Robinson, Navy
- UPI Player of the Year: David Robinson, Navy
- NABC Player of the Year: David Robinson, Navy
- Oscar Robertson Trophy (USBWA): David Robinson, Navy
- Adolph Rupp Trophy: David Robinson, Navy
- Sporting News Player of the Year: David Robinson, Navy

=== Major coach of the year awards ===
- Associated Press Coach of the Year: Tom Davis, Iowa
- UPI Coach of the Year: John Thompson, Georgetown
- Henry Iba Award (USBWA): John Chaney, Temple
- NABC Coach of the Year: Rick Pitino, Providence
- Naismith College Coach of the Year: Bob Knight, Indiana
- CBS/Chevrolet Coach of the Year: Joey Meyer, DePaul
- Sporting News Coach of the Year: Rick Pitino, Providence

=== Other major awards ===
- Frances Pomeroy Naismith Award (Best player under 6'0): Muggsy Bogues, Wake Forest
- Robert V. Geasey Trophy (Top player in Philadelphia Big 5): Nate Blackwell, Temple
- NIT/Haggerty Award (Top player in NYC): Mark Jackson, St. John's and Kevin Houston, Army

== Coaching changes ==
A number of teams changed coaches during the season and after it ended.

Team	Former Coach	Interim Coach	New Coach	Reason
Ball State	Al Brown		Rick Majerus	
Baptist	Tommy Gaither		Gary Edwards	Gaither left to coach Morehead State.
Canisius	Nick Macarchuk		Marty Marbach	Macarchuk left to coach Fordham.
Chicago State	Bob Hallberg		Tommy Suitts	
Colorado State	Tony McAndrews		Boyd Grant	
Columbia	Wayne Szoke		Wally Halas	Szoke left to coach Monmouth.
East Carolina	Charlie Harrison		Mike Steele	
Eastern Washington	Joe Folda		Bob Hofman	
Fordham	Bob Quinn		Nick Macarchuk	
George Mason	Joe Harrington		Rick Barnes	Harrington left to coach Long Beach State.
Hawaii	Frank Arnold		Riley Wallace	
Jacksonville	Bob Wenzel		Ric Haddad	Wenzel resigned and joined the New Jersey Nets coaching staff.
Long Beach State	Ron Palmer		Joe Harrington	
Maryland Eastern Shore	Howie Evans		Steve Williams	
McNeese State	Glenn Duhon		Steve Welch	
Monmouth	Ron Kornegay	Ron Krayl	Wayne Szoke	Kornegay resigned on December 19, 1986. Krayl served as interim head coach for the remainder of the season. Krayl's tenure as interim head coach ended with the end of the season. Szoke took over as permanent head coach for the following season.
Morehead State	Wayne Martin		Tommy Gaither	
Nevada	Sonny Allen		Lee Stevens	
New Orleans	Benny Dees		Art Tolis	Dees left to coach Wyoming.
Oral Roberts	Ted Owens		Ken Trickey	
Providence	Rick Pitino		Gordon Chiesa	Following a season in which he led Providence to the Final Four, Pitino accepted the head coaching position for the New York Knicks. He was replaced with top assistant Chiesa.
Rice	Tommy Suitts		Scott Thompson	
St. Francis (PA)	Kevin Porter		Jim Baron	Baron was an assistant with Notre Dame.
Sam Houston State	Stuck Tucker		Gary Moss	
Samford	Mel Hankinson		Ed McLean	
San Diego State	Smokey Gaines		Jim Brandenburg	
South Alabama	Mike Hanks		Ronnie Arrow	
South Carolina State	Chico Caldwell		Cy Alexander	
TCU	Jim Killingsworth		Moe Iba	
Toledo	Bob Nicols		Jay Eck	
UT Arlington	Snake LeGrand		Jerry Stone	
Virginia Tech	Charles Moir		Frankie Allen	Allen was an assistant under Moir.
Washington State	Lee Stevens		Kelvin Sampson	Stevens left to coach Nevada. Sampson was assistant under Stevens.
Western Carolina	Steve Cottrell		Herb Krusen	
Wyoming	Jim Brandenburg		Benny Dees	Brandenburg left to coach San Diego State.
Youngstown State	Mike Rice		Jim Cleamons	
