= List of Chicago State Cougars men's basketball head coaches =

The following is a list of Chicago State Cougars men's basketball head coaches. There have been 14 head coaches of the Cougars in their 57-season history.

Chicago State's current head coach is Gerald Gillion. He was hired as the Cougars' head coach in July 2021, replacing Lance Irvin, who was let go after the 2020–21 season.

No.	Tenure	Coach	Years	Record	Pct.
1	1966–1970	Isadoore Salario	4	48–45	.516
2	1970–1974	Robert Griggas	4	38–68	.358
3	1974–1977	Joseph Buckhalter	3	36–41	.468
4	1977–1987	Bob Hallberg	10	224–84	.727
5	1987–1990	Tommy Suitts	3	26–58	.310
6	1990–1994	Rick Pryor	4	19–91	.173
7	1994–1996 (Note: Hodges was fired on December 13, 1996, and was replaced by Gary on a permanent basis.)	Craig Hodges	3	8–51	.136
8	1996–1998	Phillip Gary	2	6–42	.125
9	1998–2003 (Note: Ellis was fired in January 2003, and was replaced by Jones on an interim basis.)	Bo Ellis	5	23–106	.178
10	2003–2007 (Note: After serving as interim coach for the end of the 2002–03 season, Jones was named permanent head coach in April 2003.)	Kevin Jones	5	41–90	.313
11	2007–2010	Benjy Taylor	3	39–72	.351
12	2010–2018	Tracy Dildy	8	55–200	.216
13	2018–2021	Lance Irvin	3	7–63	.100
14	2021–present	Gerald Gillion	2	18–45	.286
Totals		14 coaches	57 seasons	570–921	.382
Records updated through end of 2022–23 season Source
