= 1986–87 Michigan Wolverines men's basketball team =

American college basketball season

1986–87 Michigan Wolverines men's basketball

NCAA tournament, Round of 32
- Conference: Big Ten Conference
- Record: 20–12 (10–8 Big Ten)
- Head coach: Bill Frieder
- Assistant coaches: Mike Boyd; Steve Fisher; David Hammer
- MVP: Gary Grant
- Captains: Gary Grant; Antoine Joubert
- Home arena: Crisler Arena

1986–87 Big Ten Conference men's basketball standings
	Conf.				Overall
Team	W		L	PCT	W		L	PCT
No. 3 Indiana	15	–	3	.833	30	–	4	.882
No. 7 Purdue	15	–	3	.833	25	–	5	.833
No. 6 Iowa	14	–	4	.778	30	–	5	.857
No. 11 Illinois	13	–	5	.722	23	–	8	.742
Michigan	10	–	8	.556	20	–	12	.625
Ohio State	9	–	9	.500	20	–	13	.606
Michigan State	6	–	12	.333	11	–	17	.393
Wisconsin	4	–	14	.222	14	–	17	.452
Minnesota	2	–	16	.111	9	–	19	.321
Northwestern	2	–	16	.111	7	–	21	.250
As of March 30, 1987; Rankings from AP Poll

The 1986–87 Michigan Wolverines men's basketball team represented the University of Michigan in intercollegiate college basketball during the 1986–87 season. The team played its home games in the Crisler Arena in Ann Arbor, Michigan, and was a member of the Big Ten Conference. Under the direction of head coach Bill Frieder, the team finished fifth in the Big Ten Conference. The team earned the number nine seed in the 1987 NCAA Division I men's basketball tournament where it advanced one round before losing. The team was unranked all season in the Associated Press Top Twenty Poll. and it also ended the season unranked in the final UPI Coaches' Poll. Gary Grant and Antoine Joubert served as team co-captains and Grant earned team MVP.

On March 12, 1987, Garde Thompson set the Big Ten Conference single-game record for three-point field goals made with 9 against Navy. The record was unsurpassed until February 23, 2003. Thompson's performance continues to be the school record. Grant led the conference with a 2.67 steals average in conference games for the season. The team led the conference with an 86.7 points per game scoring average. Additionally, the team led the conference with a total of 89 three-point field goals made in 18 conference games. That season Thompson also set the current Michigan record for career three-point field goal percentage (48.08) as well as a single-game three-point field goal percentage record of 88.9% (8-for-9) against the UIC Flames on December 6, 1986, that would last until February 25, 1989. That night the team made 12 of 16 to set the team single-game three-point field goal percentage record, that stood until February 3, 1988, and that season the team shot 43.2% on its three-point shots which lasted two years as a school single-season record.

The team set a new school record by totaling 2821 points over the course of the season, surpassing the record of 2753 set in 1976. The record would be rebroken each of the following two seasons. For the third of five consecutive seasons, the team set the school record for single-season field goal percentage with a 52.4% (1139-for-2175) performance. Antoine Joubert's 539 career assists surpassed Eric Turner's 1984 total to set a school record that Gary Grant eclipsed the following season. For the first of three consecutive seasons, the team set the school single-season total assist record with a total of 652, surpassing the 1976 total of 600. Gary Grant's single-season steals total of 86 and average of 2.69 surpassed his own school records set the prior year and remain school records.

The team set the current school record for single-game field goal percentage on December 30, 1986, against Alaska–Anchorage Seawolves with a 69.2% (45–65) performance, surpassing the 66.2% mark set on February 23, 1978. The team also set a school single-season free throw percentage record of 75.0% that would last until 1999, surpassing the 74.8% set in 1986. On February 21, 1987, against Northwestern, the team set the school single-game free throw percentage record by making all fifteen of its free throws, which has only been outdone by the March 2, 2002 16-for-16 performance. The team set the school single-game assists record of 33 on March 7, 1987, against Purdue, surpassing the February 23, 1974, total of 32. This was surpassed twice the following December. Joubert's career total of 3960 minutes surpassed Mike McGee's school record total of 3941. Gary Grant would break the record the following season. Joubert ended his career with 127 games played and 115 games started, which surpassed Richard Rellford's 1986 school record of 124 games and Mike McGee's record of 112 starts. Gary Grant would surpass the record the following season.

In the 64-team NCAA Division I men's basketball tournament, number nine seeded Michigan advanced one round by defeating the eight-seeded Navy 97–82. In the second round the team was defeated by top-seeded North Carolina 109–97. Grant became the first Wolverine to post a triple double on against North Carolina with 24 points, 10 rebounds and 10 assists.

== Schedule ==
Date time, TV	Rank^{#}	Opponent^{#}	Result	Record	Site city, state
Regular Season
November 21, 1986*		Bradley	W 115–107	1–0	Crisler Arena; Ann Arbor, Michigan
November 22, 1986*		at Memphis State	L 76–82	1–1	Mid-South Coliseum; Memphis, Tennessee
December 1, 1986*		Ball State	W 90–57	2–1	Crisler Arena; Ann Arbor, Michigan
December 3, 1986*		Central Michigan	W 76–56	3–1	Crisler Arena; Ann Arbor, Michigan
December 6, 1986*		UIC	W 123–88	4–1	Crisler Arena; Ann Arbor, Michigan
December 8, 1986*		Western Michigan	L 59–62	4–2	Crisler Arena; Ann Arbor, Michigan
December 9, 1986*		Kent State	W 73–61	5–2	Crisler Arena; Ann Arbor, Michigan
December 15, 1986*		Bowling Green	W 76–64	6–2	Crisler Arena; Ann Arbor, Michigan
December 28, 1986*		vs. Middle Tennessee; UAB Classic	L 63–65	6–3	Birmingham-Jefferson Civic Center; Birmingham, Alabama
January 3, 1987		at No. 16 Illinois	L 84–95	6–4 (0–1)	Assembly Hall; Champaign, Illinois
January 5, 1987		at No. 6 Purdue	L 77–89	6–5 (0–2)	Mackey Arena; West Lafayette, Indiana
January 8, 1987		Ohio State	W 107–92	7–5 (1–2)	Crisler Arena; Ann Arbor, Michigan
January 12, 1987		No. 4 Indiana	L 84–85	7–6 (1–3)	Crisler Arena; Ann Arbor, Michigan
January 15, 1987		Michigan State	W 74–70	8–6 (2–3)	Crisler Arena; Ann Arbor, Michigan
January 18, 1987*		No. 5 Syracuse	W 91–88	9–6	Crisler Arena; Ann Arbor, Michigan
January 21, 1987		at Northwestern	W 87–73	10–6 (3–3)	Welsh-Ryan Arena; Evanston, Illinois
January 24, 1987		at Wisconsin	W 84–78	11–6 (4–3)	Wisconsin Field House; Madison, Wisconsin
January 29, 1987		Minnesota	W 84–78	12–6 (5–3)	Crisler Arena; Ann Arbor, Michigan
January 31, 1987		No. 2 Iowa	W 100–92	13–6 (6–3)	Crisler Arena; Ann Arbor, Michigan
February 5, 1987		at Ohio State	L 87–95	13–7 (6–4)	St. John Arena; Columbus, Ohio
February 8, 1987		at No. 2 Indiana	L 67–83	13–8 (6–5)	Assembly Hall; Bloomington, Indiana
February 15, 1987		at Michigan State	L 81–90	13–9 (6–6)	Jenison Fieldhouse; East Lansing, Michigan
February 18, 1987		Wisconsin	W 77–64	14–9 (7–6)	Crisler Arena; Ann Arbor, Michigan
February 21, 1987		Northwestern	W 101–73	15–9 (8–6)	Crisler Arena; Ann Arbor, Michigan
February 25, 1987		at Minnesota	W 95–70	16–9 (9–6)	Williams Arena; Minneapolis, Minnesota
February 28, 1987		at No. 7 Iowa	L 85–95	16–10 (9–7)	Carver-Hawkeye Arena; Iowa City, Iowa
March 4, 1987		No. 12 Illinois	L 75–89	16–11 (9–8)	Crisler Arena; Ann Arbor, Michigan
March 7, 1987		No. 3 Purdue	W 104–68	17–11 (10–8)	Crisler Arena; Ann Arbor, Michigan
NCAA Tournament
March 12, 1987*	(9 E)	(8 E) Navy; First Round	W 97–82	18–11	Charlotte Coliseum; Charlotte, North Carolina
March 14, 1987*	(9 E)	(1 E) No. 2 North Carolina; Second Round	L 97–109	18–12	Charlotte Coliseum; Charlotte, North Carolina
*Non-conference game. ^{#}Rankings from AP poll. (#) Tournament seedings in parentheses.

== Team players drafted into the NBA ==
Seven players from this team were selected in the NBA draft.

Year	Round	Pick	Overall	Player	NBA Club
1987	6	20	134	Antoine Joubert	Detroit Pistons
1988	1	15	15	Gary Grant	Seattle SuperSonics
1989	1	4	4	Glen Rice	Miami Heat
1990	1	10	10	Rumeal Robinson	Atlanta Hawks
1990	1	13	13	Loy Vaught	Los Angeles Clippers
1990	1	16	16	Terry Mills	Milwaukee Bucks

== See also ==
- NCAA men's Division I tournament bids by school
- NCAA men's Division I tournament bids by school and conference
- NCAA Division I men's basketball tournament all-time team records
