= 1986–87 Wisconsin Badgers men's basketball team =

American college basketball season

1986–87 Wisconsin Badgers men's basketball
- Conference: Big Ten Conference
- Record: 14–17 (4–14 Big Ten)
- Head coach: Steve Yoder (5th season)
- Assistant coaches: Brad McNulty (5th season); Ray McCallum (2nd season); Chris Benetti (1st season)
- Home arena: Wisconsin Field House

1986–87 Big Ten Conference men's basketball standings
	Conf.				Overall
Team	W		L	PCT	W		L	PCT
No. 3 Indiana	15	–	3	.833	30	–	4	.882
No. 7 Purdue	15	–	3	.833	25	–	5	.833
No. 6 Iowa	14	–	4	.778	30	–	5	.857
No. 11 Illinois	13	–	5	.722	23	–	8	.742
Michigan	10	–	8	.556	20	–	12	.625
Ohio State	9	–	9	.500	20	–	13	.606
Michigan State	6	–	12	.333	11	–	17	.393
Wisconsin	4	–	14	.222	14	–	17	.452
Minnesota	2	–	16	.111	9	–	19	.321
Northwestern	2	–	16	.111	7	–	21	.250
As of March 30, 1987; Rankings from AP Poll

The 1986–87 Wisconsin Badgers men's basketball team represented the University of Wisconsin as a member of the Big Ten Conference during the 1986–87 NCAA Division I men's basketball season. The team was coached by Steve Yoder, coaching his fifth season with Wisconsin. The Badgers finished 14–17, 4–14 in Big Ten play to finish in eighth place.

== Roster ==
1986–87 Wisconsin Badgers men's basketball team
Players
Coaches

Pos.	#	Name	Height	Weight	Year	Hometown
G	10	Mike Heineman (C)	6 ft 3 in (1.91 m)	185 lb (84 kg)	Sr	Connersville, Indiana
G	14	Rodney Tapp	6 ft 0 in (1.83 m)	165 lb (75 kg)	Jr	Evansville, Indiana
G	20	Byron Robinson (redshirt)	6 ft 4 in (1.93 m)	180 lb (82 kg)	Fr	Springfield, Illinois
G	22	Pollis Robertson	6 ft 7 in (2.01 m)	210 lb (95 kg)	So	Wayne, Michigan
G	24	Shelton Smith, Jr.	6 ft 0 in (1.83 m)	175 lb (79 kg)	Jr	Indianapolis, Indiana
G/F	30	Tom Molaski	6 ft 6 in (1.98 m)	205 lb (93 kg)	So	Grafton, Wisconsin
G	32	Trent Jackson	6 ft 1 in (1.85 m)	180 lb (82 kg)	So	Bolingbrook, Illinois
G	33	Sean Fleming	6 ft 2 in (1.88 m)	195 lb (88 kg)	Fr	Oakland, California
F	40	J.J. Weber (C)	6 ft 7 in (2.01 m)	240 lb (109 kg)	Sr	Wales, Wisconsin
F	41	Rob Willey (redshirt)	6 ft 9 in (2.06 m)	220 lb (100 kg)	So	Neenah, Wisconsin
F	42	Rod Ripley (C)	6 ft 8 in (2.03 m)	230 lb (104 kg)	Sr	Pulaski, Wisconsin
F	50	Danny Jones	6 ft 6 in (1.98 m)	235 lb (107 kg)	Fr	Rockford, Illinois
C	52	Darin Schubring	6 ft 10 in (2.08 m)	225 lb (102 kg)	So	Baraboo, Wisconsin
F	53	Kurt Portmann	6 ft 11 in (2.11 m)	215 lb (98 kg)	Fr	Sheboygan, Wisconsin

Head coach

- Steve Yoder (Illinois Wesleyan)

Assistant coach(es)

- Brad McNulty (Purdue)
- Ray McCallum (Ball State)
- Chris Benetti (MacMurray)

Legend

- (C) Team captain
- (S) Suspended
- (I) Ineligible
- (W) Walk-on
- Injured
- Current redshirt

== Schedule ==
Date time, TV	Rank^{#}	Opponent^{#}	Result	Record	Site city, state
Regular Season
11/28/1986*		Nebraska—Omaha	W 86–47	1–0	UW Fieldhouse; Madison, WI
11/29/1986*		South Florida	W 65–51	2–0	UW Fieldhouse; Madison, WI
12/1/1986*		at Marquette	L 71–84	2–1	Milwaukee Arena; Milwaukee, WI
12/4/1986*		South Carolina	W 47–45	3–1	UW Fieldhouse; Madison, WI
12/6/1986*		at Central Michigan	L 66–80	3–2	Rose Arena; Mount Pleasant, MI
12/8/1986*		at Miami (FL)	W 65–54	4–2	Knight Center Complex; Miami, FL
12/10/1986*		North Dakota State	W 81–76	5–2	UW Fieldhouse; Madison, WI
12/11/1986*		vs. Northern Illinois	W 95–63	6–2	Rockford MetroCentre; Rockford, IL
12/22/1986*		Eastern Illinois	W 72–68	7–2	UW Fieldhouse; Madison, WI
12/23/1986*		Kentucky State	W 87–59	8–2	UW Fieldhouse; Madison, WI
12/27/1986*		vs. Hawaii; Rainbow Classic	W 82–77	9–2	Neal S. Blaisdell Center; Honolulu, HI
12/29/1986*		vs. California; Rainbow Classic	W 66–63	10–2	Neal S. Blaisdell Center; Honolulu, HI
12/30/1986*		vs. No. 17 Pittsburgh; Rainbow Classic	L 82–98	10–3	Neal S. Blaisdell Center; Honolulu, HI
1/3/1987		at Minnesota	L 67–69	10–4 (0–1)	Williams Arena; Minneapolis, MN
1/5/1987		at No. 2 Iowa	L 63–78	10–5 (0–2)	Carver–Hawkeye Arena; Iowa City, IA
1/8/1987		No. 12 Illinois	L 66–68	10–6 (0–3)	UW Fieldhouse; Madison, WI
1/10/1987		No. 6 Purude	L 48–57	10–7 (0–4)	UW Fieldhouse; Madison, WI
1/15/1987		at No. 4 Indiana	L 65–103	10–8 (0–5)	UW Fieldhouse; Madison, WI
1/17/1987		at Ohio State	L 66–81	10–9 (0–6)	St. John Arena; Columbus, OH
1/22/1987		Michigan State	L 78–81	10–10 (0–7)	UW Fieldhouse; Madison, WI
1/24/1987		Michigan	L 78–84	10–11 (0–8)	UW Fieldhouse; Madison, WI
1/31/1987		at Northwestern	W 62–57	11–11 (1–8)	Welsh–Ryan Arena; Evanston, IL
2/5/1987		No. 7 Purdue	L 62–70	11–12 (1–9)	Mackey Arena; West Lafayette, IN
2/7/1987		at No. 14 Illinois	L 74–99	11–13 (1–10)	Assembly Hall; Champaign, IL
2/12/1987		Ohio State	L 69–83	11–14 (1–11)	UW Fieldhouse; Madison, WI
2/16/1987		No. 2 Indiana	L 85–86 ^{3OT}	11–15 (1–12)	UW Fieldhouse; Madison, WI
2/18/1987		at Michigan	L 64–77	11–16 (1–13)	Crisler Arena; Ann Arbor, MI
2/21/1987		at Michigan State	W 65–63	12–16 (2–13)	Breslin Center; East Lansing, MI
3/1/1987		Northwestern	W 76–59	13–16 (3–13)	UW Fieldhouse; Madison, WI
3/5/1987		Minnesota	W 69–52	14–16 (4–13)	UW Fieldhouse; Madison, WI
3/8/1987		No. 6 Iowa	L 71–81	14–17 (4–14)	UW Fieldhouse; Madison, WI
*Non-conference game. ^{#}Rankings from AP Poll. (#) Tournament seedings in parentheses.
