= 1987 Big South Conference men's basketball tournament =

- Classification: Division I
- Season: 1986–87
- Teams: 8
- Site: Savannah Civic Center; Savannah, GA
- Champions: Baptist College (2nd title)
- Winning coach: Tommy Gaither (2nd title)
- MVP: Ben Hinson (Charleston Southern)

1986–87 Big South Conference men's basketball standings
	Conf.				Overall
Team	W		L	PCT	W		L	PCT
Baptist †	12	–	2	.857	21	–	9	.700
Campbell	10	–	4	.714	17	–	13	.567
UNC Asheville	5	–	3	.625	15	–	11	.577
Radford	7	–	7	.500	17	–	14	.548
Winthrop	1	–	7	.125	8	–	20	.286
Coastal Carolina	4	–	4	.500	12	–	16	.429
Armstrong State	2	–	6	.250	6	–	22	.214
Augusta State	3	–	11	.214	8	–	19	.296
† 1987 Big South tournament winner Rankings from AP Poll

The 1987 Big South Conference men's basketball tournament took place February 26–28, 1987, at the Savannah Civic Center in Savannah, Georgia. For the second time in their school history, the Baptist College Buccaneers (now known as Charleston Southern) won the tournament, led by head coach Tommy Gaither.

== Format ==
All of the conference's eight members participated in the tournament, hosted at the Savannah Civic Center. Teams were seeded by conference winning percentage.

== Bracket ==
Quarterfinals; February 26
1	Baptist College	78
8	Augusta State	59
4	Radford	71
5	Winthrop	69
3	UNC Asheville	73
6	Coastal Carolina	68
2	Campbell	92
7	Armstrong	86

Semifinals; February 27
1	Baptist College	91
4	Radford	70
2	Campbell	79
3	UNC Asheville	76

Finals; February 28
1	Baptist College	64
2	Campbell	63

* Asterisk indicates overtime game

- Source

== All-Tournament Team ==
- Ben Hinson, Charleston Southern
- Oliver Johnson, Charleston Southern
- Heder Ambroise, Charleston Southern
- Clarence Grier, Campbell
- Henry Wilson, Campbell
- Van Wilkins, UNC Asheville
