= 1986–87 Northwestern Wildcats men's basketball team =

American college basketball season

1986–87 Northwestern Wildcats men's basketball
- Conference: Big Ten Conference
- Record: 7–21 (2–16 Big Ten)
- Head coach: Bill Foster (1st season)
- Home arena: Welsh–Ryan Arena

1986–87 Big Ten Conference men's basketball standings
	Conf.				Overall
Team	W		L	PCT	W		L	PCT
No. 3 Indiana	15	–	3	.833	30	–	4	.882
No. 7 Purdue	15	–	3	.833	25	–	5	.833
No. 6 Iowa	14	–	4	.778	30	–	5	.857
No. 11 Illinois	13	–	5	.722	23	–	8	.742
Michigan	10	–	8	.556	20	–	12	.625
Ohio State	9	–	9	.500	20	–	13	.606
Michigan State	6	–	12	.333	11	–	17	.393
Wisconsin	4	–	14	.222	14	–	17	.452
Minnesota	2	–	16	.111	9	–	19	.321
Northwestern	2	–	16	.111	7	–	21	.250
As of March 30, 1987; Rankings from AP Poll

The 1986–87 Northwestern Wildcats men's basketball team represented Northwestern University during the 1986–87 NCAA Division I men's basketball season.

== Roster ==
1986–87 Northwestern Wildcats men's basketball team
Players	Coaches
Pos. / # / Name / Height / Weight / Year / Hometown	Head coach: Bill Foster (Elizabethtown); Assistant coach(es) Legend: (C) Team captain; (S) Suspended; (I) Ineligible; (W) Walk-on; Injured; Current redshirt
