= 1986–87 Ohio State Buckeyes men's basketball team =

American college basketball season

1986–87 Ohio State Buckeyes men's basketball

NCAA tournament, second round
- Conference: Big Ten Conference
- Record: 20–13 (9–9 Big Ten)
- Head coach: Gary Williams (1st season)
- Assistant coaches: Randy Ayers (3rd season); Rick Barnes (1st season)
- Home arena: St. John Arena

1986–87 Big Ten Conference men's basketball standings
	Conf.				Overall
Team	W		L	PCT	W		L	PCT
No. 3 Indiana	15	–	3	.833	30	–	4	.882
No. 7 Purdue	15	–	3	.833	25	–	5	.833
No. 6 Iowa	14	–	4	.778	30	–	5	.857
No. 11 Illinois	13	–	5	.722	23	–	8	.742
Michigan	10	–	8	.556	20	–	12	.625
Ohio State	9	–	9	.500	20	–	13	.606
Michigan State	6	–	12	.333	11	–	17	.393
Wisconsin	4	–	14	.222	14	–	17	.452
Minnesota	2	–	16	.111	9	–	19	.321
Northwestern	2	–	16	.111	7	–	21	.250
As of March 30, 1987; Rankings from AP Poll

The 1986–87 Ohio State Buckeyes men's basketball team represented Ohio State University during the 1986–87 NCAA Division I men's basketball season. Led by first-year head coach Gary Williams, the Buckeyes finished 20–13 (9–9 Big Ten) and reached the second round of the NCAA tournament.

== Roster ==
1986–87 Ohio State Buckeyes men's basketball team
Players
Coaches

Pos.	#	Name	Height	Weight	Year	Hometown
G	12	Jay Burson	6 ft 0 in (1.83 m)	—	So	New Concord, Ohio
G/F	32	Dennis Hopson	6 ft 5 in (1.96 m)	200 lb (91 kg)	Sr	Toledo, Ohio

Head coach

- Gary Williams (Maryland)

Assistant coach(es)

- Randy Ayers

Legend

- (C) Team captain
- (S) Suspended
- (I) Ineligible
- (W) Walk-on
- Injured
- Current redshirt

== Schedule/results ==
Date time, TV	Rank^{#}	Opponent^{#}	Result	Record	High points	High rebounds	High assists	Site (attendance) city, state
Regular Season
Nov 29, 1986*		Bucknell	W 90–62	1–0	–	–	–	St. John Arena; Columbus, Ohio
Dec 2, 1986*		Western Michigan	W 98–92	2–0	–	–	–	St. John Arena; Columbus, Ohio
Dec 4, 1986*		Siena	W 101–57	3–0	–	–	–	St. John Arena; Columbus, Ohio
Dec 6, 1986*		Ohio	W 96–75	4–0	–	–	–	St. John Arena; Columbus, Ohio
Dec 8, 1986*		Bowling Green	W 89–52	5–0	–	–	–	St. John Arena; Columbus, Ohio
Dec 13, 1986*		Howard	W 82–63	6–0	–	–	–	St. John Arena; Columbus, Ohio
Dec 16, 1986*		at Dayton	L 86–89	6–1	–	–	–	University of Dayton Arena; Dayton, Ohio
Dec 19, 1986*		at Jacksonville; Gator Bowl Tournament	W 89–74	7–1	–	–	–	Jacksonville Memorial Coliseum; Jacksonville, Florida
Dec 20, 1986*		vs. No. Jacksonville, Florida Florida; Gator Bowl Tournament	L 72–82	7–2	–	–	–	Jacksonville Memorial Coliseum
Dec 27, 1986		vs. Arkansas; Rainbow Classic	L 94-97	7-3	–	–	–	Neal S. Blaisdell Center; Honolulu, HI
Dec 28, 1986		vs. No. 13 Kansas; Rainbow Classic	W 79-78 ^{OT}	8-3	–	–	–	Neal S. Blaisdell Center; Honolulu, HI
Dec 29, 1986		vs. No. 20 Florida; Rainbow Classic	W 88-84	9-3	–	–	–	Neal S. Blaisdell Center; Honolulu, HI
Jan 4, 1987		No. 6 Indiana	L 80-92	9-4 (0-1)	–	–	–	St. John Arena; Columbus, OH
Jan 8, 1987		at Michigan	L 92-107	9-5 (0-2)	–	–	–	Crisler Arena; Ann Arbor, MI
Jan 10, 1987		at Michigan State	L 80-90	9-6 (0-3)	–	–	–	Jenison Fieldhouse; East Lansing, MI
Jan 21, 1987		at Minnesota	W 93-78	12-6 (3-3)	–	–	–	Williams Arena; Minneapolis, MN
Jan 24, 1987; 4:05 pm		at No. 1 Iowa	W 80-76	13-6 (4-3)	36 – Hopson	–	–	Carver-Hawkeye Arena (15,500); Iowa City, IA
Jan 29, 1987		No. 4 Purdue	L 73-75	13-7 (4-4)	–	–	–	St. John Arena; Columbus, OH
Feb 2, 1987		No. 12 Illinois	L 65-82	13-8 (4-5)	–	–	–	St. John Arena; Columbus, OH
Feb 18, 1987		No. 7 Iowa	L 80-82	17-9 (8-6)	–	–	–	St. John Arena (13,541); Columbus, OH
Feb 21, 1987		Minnesota	W 88-73	19-9 (9-6)	–	–	–	St. John Arena; Columbus, OH
Feb 25, 1987		No. 14 Illinois	L 70-93	19-10 (9-7)	–	–	–	Assembly Hall; Champaign, IL
Feb 28, 1987		No. 6 Purdue	L 73-87	19-11 (9-8)	–	–	–	Mackey Arena; West Lafayette, IN
Mar 7, 1987		at No. 4 Indiana	L 81-90	19-12 (9-9)	–	–	–	Assembly Hall; Bloomington, IN
NCAA Tournament
Mar 13, 1987*	(9 SE)	vs. (8 SE) Kentucky; First Round	W 91-77	20-12	–	–	–	Omni Coliseum (15,128); Atlanta, GA
Mar 15, 1987*; CBS	(9 SE)	vs. (1 SE) No. 4 Georgetown; Second Round	L 79-82	20-13	–	–	–	Omni Coliseum (15,236); Atlanta, GA
*Non-conference game. ^{#}Rankings from AP Poll. (#) Tournament seedings in parentheses.

== Awards and honors ==
- Dennis Hopson – Big Ten Player of the Year
