= 1986–87 Indiana Hoosiers men's basketball team =

American college basketball season

1986–87 Indiana Hoosiers men's basketball

NCAA tournament National Champions Big Ten co-champions

National Championship Game, W 74–73 vs. Syracuse
- Conference: Big Ten Conference

Ranking
- Coaches: No. 2
- AP: No. 3
- Record: 30–4 (15–3 Big Ten)
- Head coach: Bobby Knight (16th season)
- Assistant coaches: Ron Felling; Kohn Smith; Royce Waltman; Joby Wright
- Captains: Steve Alford; Todd Meier; Daryl Thomas
- Home arena: Assembly Hall

1986–87 Big Ten Conference men's basketball standings
	Conf.				Overall
Team	W		L	PCT	W		L	PCT
No. 3 Indiana	15	–	3	.833	30	–	4	.882
No. 7 Purdue	15	–	3	.833	25	–	5	.833
No. 6 Iowa	14	–	4	.778	30	–	5	.857
No. 11 Illinois	13	–	5	.722	23	–	8	.742
Michigan	10	–	8	.556	20	–	12	.625
Ohio State	9	–	9	.500	20	–	13	.606
Michigan State	6	–	12	.333	11	–	17	.393
Wisconsin	4	–	14	.222	14	–	17	.452
Minnesota	2	–	16	.111	9	–	19	.321
Northwestern	2	–	16	.111	7	–	21	.250
As of March 30, 1987; Rankings from AP Poll

The 1986–87 Indiana Hoosiers men's basketball team represented Indiana University. Their head coach was Bobby Knight, who was in his 16th year. The team played its home games in Assembly Hall in Bloomington, Indiana, and was a member of the Big Ten Conference.

Despite being noted for a roster with relatively little NBA-bound talent, the Hoosiers finished the regular season with a 24–4 overall record and 15–3 in Big Ten play, claiming the conference title. The team's disciplined style and late-game resilience made it one of Bob Knight's most celebrated coaching efforts. As Big Ten Conference co-champions with Purdue, IU was named a one-seed in the 1987 NCAA Tournament.

== Roster ==
1986–87 Indiana Hoosiers men's basketball team
Players
Coaches

Pos.	#	Name	Height	Weight	Year	Hometown
G	10	Tony Freeman	5 ft 7 in (1.7 m)	144 lb (65 kg)	Fr	Westchester, Illinois
F/C	11	Todd Jadlow (redshirt)	6 ft 9 in (2.06 m)	238 lb (108 kg)	Jr	Salina, Kansas
G	12	Steve Alford	6 ft 2 in (1.88 m)	183 lb (83 kg)	Sr	New Castle, Indiana
C	14	Magnus Pelkowski	6 ft 10 in (2.08 m)	218 lb (99 kg)	Jr	Bogotá, Colombia
G/F	20	Rick Calloway	6 ft 6 in (1.98 m)	190 lb (86 kg)	So	Cincinnati, Ohio
C	22	Dean Garrett	6 ft 10 in (2.08 m)	222 lb (101 kg)	Jr	San Clemente, California
G	23	Keith Smart	6 ft 1 in (1.85 m)	175 lb (79 kg)	Jr	Baton Rouge, Louisiana
F/C	24	Daryl Thomas	6 ft 7 in (2.01 m)	236 lb (107 kg)	Sr	Westchester, Illinois
F/C	30	Todd Meier	6 ft 8 in (2.03 m)	222 lb (101 kg)	Sr	Oshkosh, Wisconsin
F	31	Dave Minor	6 ft 5 in (1.96 m)	203 lb (92 kg)	Fr	Cincinnati, Ohio
F	32	Steve Eyl	6 ft 6 in (1.98 m)	216 lb (98 kg)	Jr	Hamilton, Ohio
G	35	Jeff Oliphant	6 ft 5 in (1.96 m)	200 lb (91 kg)	So	Lyons, Indiana
G/F	42	Kreigh Smith	6 ft 7 in (2.01 m)	221 lb (100 kg)	Jr	Tipton, Indiana
G	44	Joe Hillman	6 ft 2 in (1.88 m)	184 lb (83 kg)	Jr	Glendale, California
F/C	45	Brian Sloan	6 ft 8 in (2.03 m)	210 lb (95 kg)	Jr	McLeansboro, Illinois

Head coach

- Bob Knight (Ohio State)

Assistant coach(es)

- Ron Felling (Indiana State)
- Kohn Smith (Southern Utah)
- Royce Waltman (Slippery Rock)
- Joby Wright (Indiana)

Legend

- (C) Team captain
- (S) Suspended
- (I) Ineligible
- (W) Walk-on
- Injured
- Current redshirt

Roster
Last update: 2019-Mar-16

== Schedule/results ==
Date time, TV	Rank^{#}	Opponent^{#}	Result	Record	Site city, state
Regular season
11/29/1986*	No. 3	Montana State Billings	W 90–55	1–0	Assembly Hall; Bloomington, Indiana
12/2/1986*	No. 3	at Notre Dame	W 67–62	2–0	Joyce Center; Notre Dame, Indiana
12/6/1986*	No. 3	No. 13 Kentucky; Indiana–Kentucky rivalry	W 71–66	3–0	Assembly Hall; Bloomington, Indiana
12/9/1986*	No. 2	at Vanderbilt	L 75–79	3–1	Memorial Gymnasium; Nashville, Tennessee
12/12/1986*	No. 2	UNC-Wilmington; Indiana Classic	W 73–72	4–1	Assembly Hall; Bloomington, Indiana
12/13/1986*	No. 2	East Carolina; Indiana Classic	W 96–68	5–1	Assembly Hall; Bloomington, Indiana
12/20/1986*	No. 8	Morehead State	W 84–62	6–1	Assembly Hall; Bloomington, Indiana
12/23/1986*	No. 8	Louisville	W 67–58	7–1	Assembly Hall; Bloomington, Indiana
12/26/1986*	No. 8	vs. Princeton; Hoosier Classic	W 83–54	8–1	Market Square Arena; Indianapolis
12/27/1986*	No. 8	vs. Illinois State; Hoosier Classic	W 82–58	9–1	Market Square Arena; Indianapolis
1/4/1987	No. 6	at Ohio State	W 92–80	10–1 (1–0)	St. John Arena; Columbus, Ohio
1/8/1987	No. 4	at Michigan State	W 79–60	11–1 (2–0)	Jenison Fieldhouse; East Lansing, Michigan
1/12/1987; ESPN	No. 4	at Michigan	W 85–84	12–1 (3–0)	Crisler Arena; Ann Arbor, Michigan
1/15/1987	No. 4	Wisconsin	W 103–65	13–1 (4–0)	Assembly Hall; Bloomington, Indiana
1/17/1987	No. 4	Northwestern	W 95–43	14–1 (5–0)	Assembly Hall; Bloomington, Indiana
1/22/1987	No. 3	at No. 1 Iowa	L 88–101	14–2 (5–1)	Carver–Hawkeye Arena; Iowa City, Iowa
1/24/1987	No. 3	at Minnesota	W 77–53	15–2 (6–1)	Williams Arena; Minneapolis
1/28/1987	No. 4	No. 12 Illinois; Rivalry	W 69–66	16–2 (7–1)	Assembly Hall; Bloomington, Indiana
1/31/1987	No. 4	No. 4 Purdue; Rivalry	W 88–74	17–2 (8–1)	Assembly Hall; Bloomington, Indiana
2/4/1987	No. 2	Michigan State	W 84–80	18–2 (9–1)	Assembly Hall; Bloomington, Indiana
2/8/1987	No. 2	Michigan	W 83–67	19–2 (10–1)	Assembly Hall; Bloomington, Indiana
2/11/1987	No. 2	at Northwestern	W 77–75	20–2 (11–1)	Welsh-Ryan Arena; Evanston, Illinois
2/16/1987	No. 2	at Wisconsin	W 86–85 ^{3OT}	21–2 (12–1)	Wisconsin Field House; Madison, Wisconsin
2/19/1987	No. 2	Minnesota	W 72–70	22–2 (13–1)	Assembly Hall; Bloomington, Indiana
2/21/1987	No. 2	No. 7 Iowa	W 84–75	23–2 (14–1)	Assembly Hall; Bloomington, Indiana
2/26/1987	No. 3	at No. 6 Purdue; Rivalry	L 64–75	23–3 (14–2)	Mackey Arena; West Lafayette, Indiana
3/1/1987	No. 3	at No. 14 Illinois; Rivalry	L 67–69	23–4 (14–3)	Assembly Hall; Champaign, Illinois
3/7/1987	No. 4	Ohio State	W 90–81	24–4 (15–3)	Assembly Hall; Bloomington, Indiana
NCAA Tournament
3/12/1987*	(1 MW) No. 3	vs. (16 MW) Fairfield; First Round	W 92–58	25–4 (15–3)	Hoosier Dome; Indianapolis
3/14/1987*	(1 MW) No. 3	vs. (8 MW) Auburn; Second Round	W 107–90	26–4 (15–3)	Hoosier Dome; Indianapolis
3/20/1987*	(1 MW) No. 3	vs. (5 MW) No. 17 Duke; Sweet Sixteen	W 88–82	27–4 (15–3)	Riverfront Coliseum; Cincinnati
3/22/1987*	(1 MW) No. 3	vs. (10 MW) LSU; Elite Eight	W 77–76	28–4 (15–3)	Riverfront Coliseum; Cincinnati
3/28/1987*	(1 MW) No. 3	vs. (1 W) No. 1 UNLV; Final Four	W 97–93	29–4 (15–3)	Louisiana Superdome; New Orleans
3/30/1987*	(1 MW) No. 3	vs. (2 E) No. 10 Syracuse; NCAA Championship Game	W 74–73	30–4 (15–3)	Louisiana Superdome; New Orleans
*Non-conference game. ^{#}Rankings from AP Poll. (#) Tournament seedings in parentheses. MW=Midwest.

== Rankings ==
Ranking movements Legend: ██ Increase in ranking ██ Decrease in ranking
	Week															
Poll	Pre	1	2	3	4	5	6	7	8	9	10	11	12	13	14	Final
AP	3	3	2	8	8	6	4	4	3	4	2	2	2	3	4	3
Coaches	Not released	3	2	6	6	5	4	4	4	4	2	2	2	2	4	2

== Awards and honors ==
- Steve Alford, Big Ten Player of the Year
- Dean Garrett, Big Ten Freshman of the Year
- Bobby Knight, Naismith College Coach of the Year
- Keith Smart, NCAA Men's MOP Award

== Team players drafted into the NBA ==
Year	Round	Pick	Player	NBA club
1987	2	26	Steve Alford	Dallas Mavericks
1987	6	116	Daryl Thomas	Sacramento Kings
1988	2	38	Dean Garrett	Phoenix Suns
1988	2	41	Keith Smart	Golden State Warriors
