= 1986–87 Michigan State Spartans men's basketball team =

American college basketball season

1986–87 Michigan State Spartans men's basketball
- Conference: Big Ten Conference
- Record: 11–17 (6–12 Big Ten)
- Head coach: Jud Heathcote (11th season)
- Assistant coaches: Tom Izzo; Herb Williams; Jim Boylan
- Captains: Darryl Johnson; Barry Fordham
- Home arena: Jenison Fieldhouse

1986–87 Big Ten Conference men's basketball standings
	Conf.				Overall
Team	W		L	PCT	W		L	PCT
No. 3 Indiana	15	–	3	.833	30	–	4	.882
No. 7 Purdue	15	–	3	.833	25	–	5	.833
No. 6 Iowa	14	–	4	.778	30	–	5	.857
No. 11 Illinois	13	–	5	.722	23	–	8	.742
Michigan	10	–	8	.556	20	–	12	.625
Ohio State	9	–	9	.500	20	–	13	.606
Michigan State	6	–	12	.333	11	–	17	.393
Wisconsin	4	–	14	.222	14	–	17	.452
Minnesota	2	–	16	.111	9	–	19	.321
Northwestern	2	–	16	.111	7	–	21	.250
As of March 30, 1987; Rankings from AP Poll

The 1986–87 Michigan State Spartans men's basketball team represented Michigan State University in the 1986–87 NCAA Division I men's basketball season. The team played their home games at Jenison Field House in East Lansing, Michigan and were members of the Big Ten Conference. They were coached by Jud Heathcote in his 11th year at Michigan State. The Spartans finished with a record of 11–17, 6–12 to finish in seventh place in Big Ten play.

== Previous season ==
The Spartans finished the 1985–86 season with a record of 23–8, 12–6 to finish in third place in Big Ten play. They received an at-large bid to the NCAA Tournament as the No. 5 seed in the Midwest region. There they defeated No. 12-seeded Washington and No. 4-seeded Georgetown to advance to the Sweet Sixteen where they lost to No. 1-seeded Kansas.

== Roster and statistics ==
1986–87 Michigan State Spartans men's basketball team
No	Name	Pos	Year	Height	Pts	Reb	Ast
13	Darryl Johnson	G	SR	6–2	22.1	3.7	4.0
23	Vernon Carr	G/F	SR	6–6	13.8	4.5	3.4
45	Carlton Valentine	F	JR	6–5	11.1	5.6	1.1
10	Kirk Manns	G	FR	6–1	7.3	1.3	1.4
40	Barry Fordham	F/C	SR	6–8	5.8	4.8	0.6
42	Todd Wolfe	G/F	SO	6–5	5.3	1.8	1.0
35	Ed Wright	G/F	JR	6–6	4.1	1.8	2.2
41	George Papadakos	C	JR	7–0	3.4	2.6	0.3
43	Bobby Worthington	F	JR	6–7	1.9	1.8	0.4
20	Ken Redfield	F	FR	6–7	1.4	1.1	0.6
44	Scott Sekal	F	SO	6–8	0.9	0.6	0.1
55	Mario Izzo	C	SO	6–11	0.6	0.7	0.1
30	Jim Sarkine	F	SO	6–9	0.3	0.4	0.0

== Schedule and results ==
Date time, TV	Rank^{#}	Opponent^{#}	Result	Record	Site city, state
Non-conference regular season
Nov 28, 1986*		Eastern Michigan; Spartan Cutlass Classic semifinal	W 99–83	1–0	Jenison Field House; East Lansing, MI
Nov 29, 1986*		No. 9 Navy; Spartan Cutlass Classic championship	L 90–91	1–1	Jenison Field House; East Lansing, MI
Dec 2, 1986*		Brooklyn	W 80–62	2–1	Jenison Field House; East Lansing, MI
Dec 4, 1986*		at Maine	L 81–84	2–2	Alfond Arena; Orono, ME
Dec 6, 1986*		at George Washington	W 77–62	3–2	Charles E. Smith Center; Washington, DC
Dec 13, 1986*		Iowa State	W 86–85	4–2	Jenison Field House; East Lansing, MI
Dec 16, 1986*		at Illinois–Chicago	L 65–74	4–3	UIC Pavilion; Chicago, IL
Dec 20, 1986*		at Texas Christian	L 47–66	4–4	Daniel–Meyer Coliseum; Fort Worth, TX
Dec 29, 1986*		vs. Brigham Young; Cable Car Classic semifinals	L 88–96	4–5	Toso Pavilion; Santa Clara, CA
Dec 30, 1986*		vs. Wake Forest; Cable Car Classic third place game	W 71–62	5–5	Toso Pavilion; Santa Clara, CA
Big Ten regular season
Jan 3, 1987		at No. 2 Purdue	L 72–87	5–6 (0–1)	Mackey Arena; West Lafayette, IN
Jan 5, 1987		at No. 16 Illinois	L 72–79	5–7 (0–2)	Assembly Hall; Champaign, IL
Jan 8, 1987		No. 4 Indiana	L 60–79	5–8 (0–3)	Jenison Field House; East Lansing, MI
Jan 10, 1987		Ohio State	W 90–80	6–8 (1–3)	Jenison Field House; East Lansing, MI
Jan 15, 1987		at Michigan; Rivalry	L 70–74	6–9 (1–4)	Crisler Arena; Ann Arbor, MI
Jan 22, 1987		at Wisconsin	L 71–78	7–9 (2–4)	Wisconsin Field House; Madison, WI
Jan 28, 1987		at Northwestern	L 65–67	7–10 (2–5)	Welsh-Ryan Arena; Evanston, IL
Jan 29, 1987		No. 2 Iowa	L 75–89	7–11 (2–6)	Jenison Field House; East Lansing, MI
Jan 31, 1987		Minnesota	W 72–60	8–11 (3–6)	Jenison Field House; East Lansing, MI
Feb 4, 1987		at No. 2 Indiana	L 80–84	8–12 (3–7)	Assembly Hall; Bloomington, IN
Feb 9, 1987		at Ohio State	L 72–90	8–13 (3–8)	St. John Arena; Columbus, OH
Feb 15, 1987		Michigan; Rivalry	W 90–81	9–13 (4–8)	Jenison Field House; East Lansing, MI
Feb 19, 1987		Northwestern	W 96–71	10–13 (5–8)	Jenison Field House; East Lansing, MI
Feb 21, 1987		Wisconsin	L 63–65	10–14 (6–8)	Jenison Field House; East Lansing, MI
Feb 26, 1987		at No. 7 Iowa	L 64–93	10–15 (6–9)	Carver-Hawkeye Arena; Iowa City, IA
Feb 28, 1987		at Minnesota	W 77–67	11–15 (7–9)	Williams Arena; Minneapolis, MN
Mar 4, 1987		No. 3 Purdue	L 59–69	11–16 (7–10)	Jenison Field House; East Lansing, MI
Mar 7, 1987		No. 12 Illinois	L 64–77	11–17 (7–11)	Jenison Field House; East Lansing, MI
*Non-conference game. ^{#}Rankings from AP Poll,. (#) Tournament seedings in parentheses. All times are in Eastern Time.
