= 1986–87 Purdue Boilermakers men's basketball team =

American college basketball season

1986–87 Purdue Boilermakers men's basketball

Big Ten Regular Season Co-Champions

NCAA tournament, second round
- Conference: Big Ten Conference

Ranking
- Coaches: No. 6
- AP: No. 7
- Record: 25–5 (15–3 Big Ten)
- Head coach: Gene Keady (7th season)
- Assistant coaches: Bruce Weber (7th season); Kevin Stallings (5th season); Tom Reiter (1st season)
- Captains: Tim Fisher; Doug Lee (basketball)
- Home arena: Mackey Arena

1986–87 Big Ten Conference men's basketball standings
| | Conf. | | | | Overall |
| Team | W | | L | PCT | W | | L | PCT |
|---|---|---|---|---|---|---|---|---|
| No. 3 Indiana | 15 | – | 3 | .833 | 30 | – | 4 | .882 |
| No. 7 Purdue | 15 | – | 3 | .833 | 25 | – | 5 | .833 |
| No. 6 Iowa | 14 | – | 4 | .778 | 30 | – | 5 | .857 |
| No. 11 Illinois | 13 | – | 5 | .722 | 23 | – | 8 | .742 |
| Michigan | 10 | – | 8 | .556 | 20 | – | 12 | .625 |
| Ohio State | 9 | – | 9 | .500 | 20 | – | 13 | .606 |
| Michigan State | 6 | – | 12 | .333 | 11 | – | 17 | .393 |
| Wisconsin | 4 | – | 14 | .222 | 14 | – | 17 | .452 |
| Minnesota | 2 | – | 16 | .111 | 9 | – | 19 | .321 |
| Northwestern | 2 | – | 16 | .111 | 7 | – | 21 | .250 |
As of March 30, 1987; Rankings from AP Poll

The 1986–87 Purdue Boilermakers men's basketball team represented Purdue University during the 1986–87 college basketball season.

== Roster ==
1986–87 Purdue Boilermakers men's basketball team
Players
Coaches

| Pos. | # | Name | Height | Weight | Year | Hometown |
|---|---|---|---|---|---|---|
| G/F | 20 | Doug Lee | 6 ft 5 in (1.96 m) | 195 lb (88 kg) | Sr | Washington, Illinois |
| G | 21 | Everette Stephens | 6 ft 2 in (1.88 m) | 175 lb (79 kg) | Jr | Evanston, Illinois |
| G | 23 | Troy Lewis | 6 ft 7 in (2.01 m) | 205 lb (93 kg) | Jr | Toledo, Ohio |
| F | 30 | Kip Jones | 6 ft 8 in (2.03 m) | — | So |
| F | 33 | Todd Mitchell | 6 ft 4 in (1.93 m) | 190 lb (86 kg) | Jr | Anderson, Indiana |
| F | 35 | Melvin McCants | 6 ft 8 in (2.03 m) | 240 lb (109 kg) | So | Chicago, Illinois |
| F/C | 55 | Steve Scheffler | 6 ft 9 in (2.06 m) | 250 lb (113 kg) | Fr | Grand Rapids, Michigan |

Head coach

- Gene Keady (Kansas State)

Assistant coach(es)

- Bruce Weber (Milwaukee)
- Kevin Stallings (Purdue)
- Tom Reiter

Legend

- (C) Team captain
- (S) Suspended
- (I) Ineligible
- (W) Walk-on
- Injured
- Current redshirt

== Schedule ==
| Date time, TV | Rank^{#} | Opponent^{#} | Result | Record | High points | High rebounds | High assists | Site city, state |
|---|---|---|---|---|---|---|---|---|
| November 21 | | Bulgaria; Exhibition | W 104–73 | | – | – | – | Mackey Arena; West Lafayette, IN |
Regular Season
| November 28* | No. 4 | vs. Stetson | W 97–65 | 1-0 | – | – | – | Daytona Beach, FL |
| December 1* | | Illinois State | W 96–64 | 2-0 | – | – | – | Mackey Arena; West Lafayette, IN |
| December 6* | No. 4 | at Connecticut | W 88–70 | 3-0 | – | – | – | Hartford Civic Center; Hartford, CT |
| December 8* | No. 3 | Wichita State | W 77–61 | 4-0 | – | – | – | Mackey Arena; West Lafayette, IN |
| December 13* | No. 3 | at Detroit | W 89–65 | 5-0 | – | – | – | Detroit, MI |
| December 20* | No. 2 | Tampa | W 79–48 | 6-0 | – | – | – | Mackey Arena; West Lafayette, IN |
| December 22* | No. 2 | at Toledo | W 89–67 | 7-0 | – | – | – | Toledo, OH |
| December 29* | No. 2 | vs. No. 4 North Carolina; Dallas Morning News Classic | L 81–94 | 7-1 | – | – | – | Dallas, TX |
| December 30* | No. 2 | vs. Towson State; Dallas Morning News Classic | W 94–58 | 8-1 | – | – | – | Dallas, TX |
| January 3 | No. 2 | Michigan State | W 87–72 | 9-1 (1-0) | – | – | – | Mackey Arena; West Lafayette, IN |
| January 5 | No. 2 | Michigan | W 89–77 | 10-1 (2-0) | – | – | – | Mackey Arena; West Lafayette, IN |
| January 8 | No. 6 | at Northwestern | W 85–67 | 11-1 (3-0) | – | – | – | Evanston, IL |
| January 10 | No. 6 | at Wisconsin | W 57–48 | 12-1 (4-0) | – | – | – | Madison, WI |
| January 14 | No. 6 | Minnesota | W 86–59 | 13-1 (5-0) | – | – | – | Mackey Arena; West Lafayette, IN |
| January 18* | No. 6 | Louisville | W 88–73 | 14-1 | – | – | – | Mackey Arena; West Lafayette, IN |
| January 19 | No. 6 | No. 2 Iowa | L 67–70 | 14-2 (5-1) | – | – | – | Mackey Arena; West Lafayette, IN |
| January 22 | No. 5 | No. 9 Illinois | W 87–86 ^{OT} | 15-2 (6-1) | – | – | – | Mackey Arena; West Lafayette, IN |
| January 29 | No. 4 | Ohio State | W 75–73 | 16-2 (7-1) | – | – | – | Columbus, OH |
| January 31 | No. 4 | at Indiana; Indiana–Purdue rivalry | L 77–88 | 16-3 (7-2) | – | – | – | Bloomington, IN |
| February 5 | No. 7 | Wisconsin | W 70–62 | 17-3 (8-2) | – | – | – | Mackey Arena; West Lafayette, IN |
| February 7 | No. 7 | Northwestern | W 86–60 | 18-3 (9-2) | – | – | – | Mackey Arena; West Lafayette, IN |
| February 12 | No. 7 | at No. 4 Iowa | W 80–73 | 19-3 (10-2) | – | – | – | Carver-Hawkeye Arena; Iowa City, IA |
| February 14 | No. 7 | at Minnesota | W 81–73 | 20-3 (11-2) | – | – | – | Minneapolis, MN |
| February 23 | No. 6 | at No. 14 Illinois | W 76–75 ^{OT} | 21-3 (12-2) | – | – | – | Champaign, IL |
| February 26 | No. 6 | No. 3 Indiana | W 75–64 | 22-3 (13-2) | – | – | – | Mackey Arena; West Lafayette, IN |
| February 28 | No. 6 | Ohio State | W 87–73 | 23-3 (14-2) | – | – | – | Mackey Arena; West Lafayette, IN |
| March 4 | No. 3 | at Michigan State | W 69–59 | 24-3 (15-2) | – | – | – | East Lansing, MI |
| March 7 | No. 3 | at Michigan | L 68–104 | 24-4 (15-3) | – | – | – | Crisler Arena; Ann Arbor, MI |
NCAA Tournament
| March 13* | (3) No. 7 | vs. (14) Northeastern; NCAA tournament • First Round | W 104–95 | 25-4 | 29 – Lee | – | – | Syracuse, NY |
| March 15* | (3) No. 7 | vs. (6) Florida; NCAA Tournament • Second Round | L 66–85 | 25-5 | 17 – Lewis/Stephens | – | – | Syracuse, NY |
*Non-conference game. ^{#}Rankings from AP Poll. (#) Tournament seedings in parentheses.

== Team players drafted into the NBA ==
| Round | Pick | Player | NBA club |
|---|---|---|---|
| 2 | 35 | Doug Lee | Houston Rockets |
