= 1986–87 Iowa Hawkeyes men's basketball team =

American college basketball season

1986–87 Iowa Hawkeyes men's basketball

Great Alaska Shootout champion Amana-Hawkeye Classic champion Anteater Classic champion

NCAA men's Division I tournament, Elite Eight
- Conference: Big Ten Conference

Ranking
- Coaches: No. 7
- AP: No. 6
- Record: 30–5 (14–4 Big Ten)
- Head coach: Tom Davis (1st season)
- Assistant coaches: Bruce Pearl; Gary Close; Rudy Washington
- MVPs: Kevin Gamble; Michael PayneRoy Marble
- Home arena: Carver-Hawkeye Arena

1986–87 Big Ten Conference men's basketball standings
	Conf.				Overall
Team	W		L	PCT	W		L	PCT
No. 3 Indiana	15	–	3	.833	30	–	4	.882
No. 7 Purdue	15	–	3	.833	25	–	5	.833
No. 6 Iowa	14	–	4	.778	30	–	5	.857
No. 11 Illinois	13	–	5	.722	23	–	8	.742
Michigan	10	–	8	.556	20	–	12	.625
Ohio State	9	–	9	.500	20	–	13	.606
Michigan State	6	–	12	.333	11	–	17	.393
Wisconsin	4	–	14	.222	14	–	17	.452
Minnesota	2	–	16	.111	9	–	19	.321
Northwestern	2	–	16	.111	7	–	21	.250
As of March 30, 1987; Rankings from AP Poll

The 1986–87 Iowa Hawkeyes men's basketball team represented the University of Iowa as members of the Big Ten Conference. The team was led by first-year head coach Tom Davis and played their home games at Carver-Hawkeye Arena. They finished the season 30–5 overall and 14–4 in Big Ten play to finish in third place. The Hawkeyes won their first 18 games and ascended to the first #1 ranking in school history in late January. The 30 overall wins and 14 conference wins remain single-season school records. Iowa received an at-large bid to the NCAA tournament as #2 seed in the West Region. After defeating Santa Clara in the first round, UTEP in the second round, and Oklahoma in a thrilling Sweet Sixteen matchup, they lost to #1 UNLV in the West Regional Final, 84–81.

== Roster ==
1986–87 Iowa Hawkeyes men's basketball team
Players
Coaches

Pos.	#	Name	Height	Weight	Year	Hometown
F/C	3	Gerry Wright	6 ft 7 in (2.01 m)	—	Sr	San Bernardino, California
G	5	Bart Casey	6 ft 5 in (1.96 m)	—	Jr	Iowa City, Iowa
G	10	B. J. Armstrong	6 ft 2 in (1.88 m)	—	So	Bloomfield Hills, Michigan
G	11	Michael Reaves	6 ft 3 in (1.91 m)	—	Jr	Milledgeville, Georgia
G/F	14	Bill Jones	6 ft 7 in (2.01 m)	—	Jr	Detroit, Michigan
G	20	Jeff Moe	6 ft 3 in (1.91 m)	—	Jr	Indianapolis, Indiana
G/F	23	Roy Marble	6 ft 6 in (1.98 m)	—	So	Flint, Michigan
G	24	Michael Morgan	6 ft 3 in (1.91 m)	—	Jr	Haughton, Louisiana
F	25	Ed Horton	6 ft 8 in (2.03 m)	—	So	Springfield, Illinois
F	32	Mark Jewell	6 ft 9 in (2.06 m)	—	Fr	Lafayette, Indiana
G/F	35	Kevin Gamble	6 ft 5 in (1.96 m)	—	Sr	Springfield, Illinois
F	40	Kent Hill	6 ft 6 in (1.98 m)	—	Jr	Wichita, Kansas
F	44	Al Lorenzen	6 ft 9 in (2.06 m)	—	Jr	Cedar Rapids, Iowa
C	51	Les Jepsen	7 ft 0 in (2.13 m)	—	Fr	Bowbells, North Dakota
F/C	54	Brad Lohaus	6 ft 11 in (2.11 m)	—	RS Sr	Phoenix, Arizona

Head coach

- Tom Davis (UW–Platteville)

Assistant coach(es)

- Bruce Pearl (Boston College)
- Gary Close (Arizona State)
- Rudy Washington (Redlands)

Legend

- (C) Team captain
- (S) Suspended
- (I) Ineligible
- (W) Walk-on
- Injured
- Current redshirt

== Schedule and results ==
Date time, TV	Rank^{#}	Opponent^{#}	Result	Record	High points	High rebounds	High assists	Site (attendance) city, state
Regular Season
11/28/1986*	No. 10	at Alaska-Anchorage; Great Alaska Shootout	W 91–81	1–0	18 – Marble	12 – Lohaus	–	Sullivan Arena (4,369); Anchorage, AK
11/29/1986*	No. 10	vs. No. 17 NC State; Great Alaska Shootout	W 90–89 ^{OT}	2–0	26 – Armstrong	10 – Horton	–	Sullivan Arena (3,780); Anchorage, AK
11/30/1986*	No. 10	vs. Northeastern; Great Alaska Shootout	W 103–80	3–0	29 – Marble	12 – Lohaus	–	Sullivan Arena (5,738); Anchorage, AK
12/3/1986*; 7:30 pm	No. 5	Missouri-St. Louis	W 89–64	4–0	14 – Moe	7 – Lohaus	–	Carver-Hawkeye Arena (15,341); Iowa City, IA
12/5/1986*	No. 5	Delaware; Amana-Hawkeye Classic	W 95–47	5–0	16 – Lohaus	9 – Horton	–	Carver-Hawkeye Arena (8,340); Iowa City, IA
12/6/1986*	No. 5	Loyola Marymount; Amana-Hawkeye Classic	W 103–80	6–0	21 – Armstrong	9 – Lohaus	–	Carver-Hawkeye Arena (9,225); Iowa City, IA
12/9/1986*	No. 4	BYU	W 86–75	7–0	28 – Moe	10 – Lohaus	–	Carver-Hawkeye Arena (15,416); Iowa City, IA
12/13/1986*	No. 4	Drake; Iowa Big Four	W 69–62	8–0	19 – Marble	10 – Horton	–	Veterans Memorial Auditorium (12,125); Des Moines, IA
12/20/1986*	No. 3	Iowa State; Rivalry	W 89–64	9–0	–	–	–	Carver-Hawkeye Arena (15,500); Iowa City, IA
12/22/1986*	No. 3	vs. Rider	W 104–71	10–0	–	–	–	Carver-Hawkeye Arena; Iowa City, IA
12/28/1986*	No. 3	vs. Portland; Anteater Classic	W 84–65	11–0	–	–	–	Long Beach Arena; Long Beach, CA
12/29/1986*	No. 3	vs. UC Irvine; Anteater Classic	W 105–103	12–0	–	–	–	Long Beach Arena; Long Beach, CA
1/3/1987	No. 3	Northwestern	W 80–44	13–0 (1–0)	11 – 3 tied	–	–	Carver-Hawkeye Arena; Iowa City, IA
1/5/1987	No. 3	Wisconsin	W 78–63	14–0 (2–0)	16 – Horton	8 – 2 tied	6 – Marble	Carver-Hawkeye Arena; Iowa City, IA
1/10/1987	No. 2	at Minnesota	W 78–57	15–0 (3–0)	17 – Gamble	7 – Horton	2 – 2 tied	Williams Arena (16,104); Minneapolis, MN
1/14/1987	No. 2	at No. 8 Illinois	W 91–88 ^{OT}	16–0 (4–0)	23 – Lohaus	12 – Lohaus	–	Assembly Hall (16,666); Champaign, IL
1/19/1987; 8:05 pm, ESPN	No. 2	at No. 6 Purdue	W 70–67	17–0 (5–0)	19 – Gamble	8 – 2 tied	–	Mackey Arena (14,123); West Lafayette, IN
1/22/1987	No. 1	No. 3 Indiana	W 101–88	18–0 (6–0)	17 – 2 tied	11 – Horton	–	Carver-Hawkeye Arena (15,570); Iowa City, IA
1/24/1987; 3:05 pm	No. 1	Ohio State	L 76–80	18–1 (6–1)	20 – Armstrong	16 – Lohaus	3 – 2 tied	Carver-Hawkeye Arena (15,500); Iowa City, IA
1/29/1987	No. 2	at Michigan State	W 89–75	19–1 (7–1)	19 – Gamble	8 – Wright	–	Jenison Fieldhouse (10,004); East Lansing, MI
1/31/1987	No. 2	at Michigan	L 92–100	19–2 (7–2)	22 – Gamble	8 – Lohaus	–	Crisler Arena (13,609); Ann Arbor, MI
2/4/1987	No. 4	Minnesota	W 78–47	20–2 (8–2)	14 – Marble	9 – Marble	–	Carver-Hawkeye Arena (15,500); Iowa City, IA
2/7/1987	No. 4	Arizona	W 89–80	21–2	20 – Gamble	9 – Lohaus	–	McKale Center (13,377); Tucson, AZ
2/12/1987; 7:35 pm	No. 4	No. 7 Purdue	L 73–80	21–3 (8–3)	14 – 2 tied	7 – 2 tied	–	Carver-Hawkeye Arena (15,500); Iowa City, IA
2/14/1987	No. 4	No. 11 Illinois	W 66–61	22–3 (9–3)	13 – Lohaus	8 – Lohaus	–	Carver-Hawkeye Arena (15,500); Iowa City, IA
2/18/1987	No. 7	at Ohio State	W 82–80	23–3 (10–3)	24 – Marble	9 – 2 tied	–	St. John Arena (13,541); Columbus, OH
2/21/1987	No. 7	at No. 2 Indiana	L 75–84	23–4 (10–4)	20 – Marble	8 – Wright	–	Assembly Hall (17,343); Bloomington, IN
2/26/1987	No. 7	Michigan State	W 93–64	24–4 (11–4)	18 – Marble	12 – Lohaus	–	Carver-Hawkeye Arena (15,500); Iowa City, IA
2/28/1987	No. 7	Michigan	W 95–85	25–4 (12–4)	22 – Moe	9 – Lohaus	–	Carver-Hawkeye Arena (15,500); Iowa City, IA
3/5/1987	No. 6	at Northwestern	W 103–76	26–4 (13–4)	21 – Gamble	10 – Lohaus	–	Welsh-Ryan Arena (8,117); Evanston, IL
3/8/1987	No. 6	at Wisconsin	W 81–71	27–4 (14–4)	20 – Marble	8 – Lohaus	–	Wisconsin Field House (11,866); Madison, WI
NCAA Tournament
3/13/1987*	(2 W) No. 6	vs. (15 W) Santa Clara; First round	W 99–76	28–4	18 – Gamble	–	–	McKale Center; Tucson, AZ
3/15/1987*; CBS	(2 W) No. 6	vs. (7 W) UTEP; Second Round	W 84–82	29–4	28 – Marble	7 – Marble	–	McKale Center; Tucson, AZ
3/20/1987*; CBS	(2 W) No. 6	vs. (6 W) Oklahoma; West Regional semifinal – Sweet Sixteen	W 93–91 ^{OT}	30–4	26 – Gamble	7 – Marble	–	Kingdome (23,035); Seattle, WA
3/22/1987*; CBS	(2 W) No. 6	vs. (1 W) No. 1 UNLV; West Regional Final – Elite Eight	L 81–84	30–5	18 – 2 tied	7 – Lohaus	–	Kingdome (22,914); Seattle, WA
*Non-conference game. ^{#}Rankings from AP Poll. (#) Tournament seedings in parentheses. W=West.

== Rankings ==
Ranking movements Legend: ██ Increase in ranking ██ Decrease in ranking ( ) = First-place votes
	Week															
Poll	Pre	1	2	3	4	5	6	7	8	9	10	11	12	13	14	Final
AP	10	5	4	3	3 (1)	3 (1)	2 (3)	2 (5)	1 (34)	2 (2)	4 (1)	4	7	7	6	6
Coaches	Not released	6	3	4	3	4	3	3	2 (10)	3	4	4	4	8	6	7

== Awards and honors ==
- Tom Davis, Big Ten Men's Basketball Coach of the Year and AP College Basketball Coach of the Year

== Team players in the 1987 NBA draft ==
Round	Pick	Player	NBA club
2	45	Brad Lohaus	Boston Celtics
3	63	Kevin Gamble	Portland Trail Blazers
5	111	Gerry Wright	Detroit Pistons

Overall, eight players from this team were selected in the NBA draft.
