= 1986–87 Northeastern Huskies men's basketball team =

American college basketball season

1986–87 Northeastern Huskies men's basketball

ECAC North Regular-season champion ECAC North Conference tournament champion

NCAA tournament, First Round
- Conference: Eastern College Athletic Conference-North
- Record: 27–7 (17–1 ECAC-North)
- Head coach: Karl Fogel (1st season)
- Assistant coaches: J. Keith Motley; Kevin Dunne; Dennis Walsh
- Home arena: Matthews Arena

1986–87 ECAC North men's basketball standings
	Conf.				Overall
Team	W		L	PCT	W		L	PCT
Northeastern †	17	–	1	.944	27	–	7	.794
Niagara	14	–	4	.778	21	–	10	.677
Boston University	12	–	6	.667	18	–	12	.600
Canisius	12	–	6	.667	16	–	12	.571
Siena	12	–	6	.667	17	–	12	.586
Hartford	8	–	10	.444	14	–	14	.500
Maine	6	–	12	.333	10	–	18	.357
Vermont	3	–	15	.167	5	–	23	.179
New Hampshire	3	–	15	.167	4	–	24	.143
Colgate	3	–	15	.167	4	–	23	.148
† 1987 ECAC North tournament winner Rankings from AP Poll

The 1986–87 Northeastern Huskies men's basketball team represented Northeastern University during the 1985–86 college basketball season. Led by first-year head coach Karl Fogel, the Huskies competed in the ECAC North Conference and played their home games at Matthews Arena. They finished the season 27–7 overall with a 17–1 mark in ECAC North play to win the regular season conference title. The Huskies one conference loss split two separate 11-game win streaks. They followed the regular season by winning the ECAC North Conference tournament to earn a bid to the NCAA tournament as No. 14 seed in the East region. The Huskies were defeated in the opening round by No. 3 seed Purdue, 104–95.

Senior Reggie Lewis was awarded the ECAC North Player of the Year for the third consecutive season. He would finish as the school's all-time leading scorer and was drafted by the Boston Celtics with the 22nd pick in the 1987 NBA draft.

== Roster ==
1986–87 Northeastern Huskies men's basketball team
Players
Coaches

Pos.	#	Name	Height	Weight	Year	Previous school	Hometown
G	20	Andre LaFleur	6 ft 3 in (1.91 m)	180 lb (82 kg)	Sr	Gov. Dummer Academy	Los Angeles, California
F	21	Wes Fuller	6 ft 5 in (1.96 m)	190 lb (86 kg)	Sr	Camden HS	Camden, New Jersey
F		Kevin Lee	6 ft 8 in (2.03 m)	—	Sr
G/F	35	Reggie Lewis	6 ft 7 in (2.01 m)	185 lb (84 kg)	Sr	Paul Laurence Dunbar HS	Baltimore, Maryland

Head coach

- Karl Fogel

Assistant coach(es)

- J. Keith Motley
- Kevin Dunne
- Dennis Walsh

Legend

- (C) Team captain
- (S) Suspended
- (I) Ineligible
- (W) Walk-on
- Injured
- Current redshirt

== Schedule and results ==
Date time, TV	Rank^{#}	Opponent^{#}	Result	Record	Site city, state
Regular season
Nov 28, 1986*		vs. No. 2 Louisville; Great Alaska Shootout	W 88–84 ^{OT}	1–0	Sullivan Arena; Anchorage, Alaska
Nov 29, 1986*		vs. Utah State; Great Alaska Shootout	W 96–91	2–0	Sullivan Arena; Anchorage, Alaska
Nov 30, 1986*		vs. No. 10 Iowa; Great Alaska Shootout	L 80–103	2–1	Sullivan Arena; Anchorage, Alaska
Dec 3, 1986*	No. 19	Saint Joseph's (Maine)	W 81–54	3–1	Matthews Arena; Boston, Massachusetts
Dec 5, 1986*	No. 19	vs. Jacksonville	W 76–70	4–1	Carrier Dome; Syracuse, New York
Dec 6, 1986*	No. 19	at No. 17 Syracuse	L 74–94	4–2	Carrier Dome; Syracuse, New York
Dec 8, 1986*		at East Carolina	L 70–74	4–3	Minges Coliseum; Greenville, North Carolina
Dec 13, 1986*		at UMass	W 78–70	5–3	Curry Hicks Cage; Amherst, Massachusetts
Dec 26, 1986*		vs. Bradley	L 105–110	5–4	Palestra; Philadelphia, Pennsylvania
Dec 27, 1986*		at La Salle	L 85–102	5–5	Palestra; Philadelphia, Pennsylvania
Jan 2, 1987		at Maine	W 72–64	6–5 (1–0)	Alfond Arena; Orono, Maine
Jan 4, 1987		at New Hampshire	W 91–64	7–5 (2–0)	Lundholm Gym; Durham, New Hampshire
Jan 6, 1987		Hartford	W 64–62	8–5 (3–0)	Matthews Arena; Boston, Massachusetts
Jan 8, 1987*		Tufts	W 99–72	9–5	Matthews Arena; Boston, Massachusetts
Jan 10, 1987		Canisius	W 89–61	10–5 (4–0)	Matthews Arena; Boston, Massachusetts
Jan 13, 1987		at Hartford	W 74–65	11–5 (5–0)	Hartford Civic Center; Hartford, Connecticut
Jan 17, 1987		Siena	W 93–64	12–5 (6–0)	Matthews Arena; Boston, Massachusetts
Jan 24, 1987		Maine	W 104–78	13–5 (7–0)	Matthews Arena; Boston, Massachusetts
Jan 26, 1987*		Quinnipiac	W 104–54	14–5	Matthews Arena; Boston, Massachusetts
Jan 28, 1987		at Vermont	W 68–66	15–5 (8–0)	Patrick Gym; Burlington, Vermont
Jan 31, 1987		Niagara	W 60–50	16–5 (9–0)	Matthews Arena; Boston, Massachusetts
Feb 5, 1987		at Niagara	L 87–88	16–6 (9–1)	Buffalo Memorial Auditorium; Lewiston, New York
Feb 7, 1987		at Canisius	W 72–68	17–6 (10–1)	Koessler Athletic Center; Buffalo, New York
Feb 9, 1987		at Colgate	W 96–79	18–6 (11–1)	Cotterell Court; Hamilton, New York
Feb 14, 1987		Boston University	W 68–65	19–6 (12–1)	Matthews Arena; Boston, Massachusetts
Feb 18, 1987		Colgate	W 97–73	20–6 (13–1)	Matthews Arena; Boston, Massachusetts
Feb 21, 1987		at Siena	W 90–83	21–6 (14–1)	Alumni Recreation Center; Loudonville, New York
Feb 23, 1987		New Hampshire	W 76–69	22–6 (15–1)	Matthews Arena; Boston, Massachusetts
Feb 25, 1987		Vermont	W 80–68	23–6 (16–1)	Matthews Arena; Boston, Massachusetts
Feb 28, 1987		at Boston University	W 84–77	24–6 (17–1)	Case Gym; Boston, Massachusetts
ECAC North tournament
Mar 5, 1987*		New Hampshire; Quarterfinals	W 85–71	25–6	Matthews Arena; Boston, Massachusetts
Mar 6, 1987*		Siena; Semifinals	W 89–79	26–6	Matthews Arena; Boston, Massachusetts
Mar 7, 1987*		Boston University; Championship game	W 71–68	27–6	Matthews Arena; Boston, Massachusetts
NCAA Tournament
Mar 13, 1987*	(14 E)	vs. (3 E) No. 7 Purdue	L 95–104	27–7	Carrier Dome; Syracuse, New York
*Non-conference game. ^{#}Rankings from AP poll. (#) Tournament seedings in parentheses. E=East.

== Awards and honors ==
- Reggie Lewis – ECAC North Player of the Year (3x)

== NBA draft ==
Round	Pick	Player	NBA club
1	22	Reggie Lewis	Boston Celtics
