= 1986–87 Illinois Fighting Illini men's basketball team =

American college basketball season

1986–87 Illinois Fighting Illini men's basketball

Illini Classic, Champion BYU-Hawaii Classic, Champion

NCAA men's Division I tournament, first round
- Conference: Big Ten Conference

Ranking
- Coaches: No. 11
- AP: No. 11
- Record: 23–8 (13–5 Big Ten)
- Head coach: Lou Henson (12th season)
- Assistant coaches: Dick Nagy (8th season); Jimmy Collins (4th season); Mark Coomes (2nd season)
- MVP: Ken Norman
- Captains: Doug Altenberger; Ken Norman; Tony Wysinger
- Home arena: Assembly Hall

1986–87 Big Ten Conference men's basketball standings
	Conf.				Overall
Team	W		L	PCT	W		L	PCT
No. 3 Indiana	15	–	3	.833	30	–	4	.882
No. 7 Purdue	15	–	3	.833	25	–	5	.833
No. 6 Iowa	14	–	4	.778	30	–	5	.857
No. 11 Illinois	13	–	5	.722	23	–	8	.742
Michigan	10	–	8	.556	20	–	12	.625
Ohio State	9	–	9	.500	20	–	13	.606
Michigan State	6	–	12	.333	11	–	17	.393
Wisconsin	4	–	14	.222	14	–	17	.452
Minnesota	2	–	16	.111	9	–	19	.321
Northwestern	2	–	16	.111	7	–	21	.250
As of March 30, 1987; Rankings from AP Poll

The 1986–87 Illinois Fighting Illini men's basketball team represented the University of Illinois.

== Regular season ==
The 1986–87 season saw the addition of a group of young players to the roster. Guards Steve Bardo, Kendall Gill and Larry Smith joined forward Nick Anderson in a highly touted recruiting class. This group produced another 20-win season (23–8) and a trip to the NCAA Tournament, where Illinois was beaten 68–67 by Austin Peay

This marked the first season in Big Ten Conference basketball history where two teams finished with 30 or more victories. This season also marks the NCAA's first unified 3-point line of 19 feet 9 inches after 5 years of experimentation.

=== Roster ===
1986–87 Illinois Fighting Illini men's basketball team
Players
Coaches

Pos.	#	Name	Height	Weight	Year	Previous school	Hometown
G	10	Tony Wysinger (C)	5 ft 10 in (1.78 m)	155 lb (70 kg)	Sr	Peoria Central High School	Peoria, Illinois
G	13	Kendall Gill	6 ft 3 in (1.91 m)	180 lb (82 kg)	Fr	Rich Central High School	Matteson, Illinois
G	21	Glynn Blackwell	6 ft 4 in (1.93 m)	175 lb (79 kg)	Jr	Highland Park Community High School	Highland Park, Michigan
G	22	Doug Altenberger (C)	6 ft 4 in (1.93 m)	200 lb (91 kg)	RS Sr	Richwoods High School	Peoria, Illinois
G/F	25	Nick Anderson	6 ft 6 in (1.98 m)	215 lb (98 kg)	Fr	Simeon High School	Chicago, Illinois
G	31	Larry Smith	6 ft 2 in (1.88 m)	185 lb (84 kg)	Fr	Alton High School	Alton, Illinois
F	32	Kenny Battle (redshirt)	6 ft 5 in (1.96 m)	210 lb (95 kg)	Jr	West Aurora High School	Aurora, Illinois
F	33	Ken Norman (C)	6 ft 8 in (2.03 m)	215 lb (98 kg)	Sr	Crane High School	Chicago, Illinois
G	34	Dave Wells	6 ft 5 in (1.96 m)	200 lb (91 kg)	Sr	Freeport High School	Freeport, Illinois
G/F	35	Stephen Bardo	6 ft 5 in (1.96 m)	215 lb (98 kg)	Fr	Carbondale Community High School	Carbondale, Illinois
C	40	Olaf Blab (redshirt)	7 ft 1 in (2.16 m)	235 lb (107 kg)	RS So	Charleston High School	Munich, West Germany
F	42	Jim Green	6 ft 4 in (1.93 m)	190 lb (86 kg)	Jr	Academy of Our Lady/Spalding Institute	Morton, Illinois
F	43	Jeff Finke	6 ft 6 in (1.98 m)	200 lb (91 kg)	Fr	Casey-Westfield High School	Casey, Illinois
F	44	Phil Kunz	6 ft 9 in (2.06 m)	230 lb (104 kg)	Fr	Carlyle High School	Carlyle, Illinois
F	45	Lowell Hamilton	6 ft 7 in (2.01 m)	210 lb (95 kg)	So	Providence St. Mel High School	Chicago, Illinois
F/C	50	Bryan Brickner	6 ft 6 in (1.98 m)	180 lb (82 kg)	Fr	Scales Mound High School	Scales Mound, Illinois
C	54	Jens Kujawa	7 ft 0 in (2.13 m)	245 lb (111 kg)	RS So	Taylorville High School	Braunschweig, West Germany

Head coach

- Lou Henson (New Mexico State University) (12th year)

Assistant coach(es)

- Jimmy Collins (New Mexico State) (4th year)
- Dick Nagy (Hardin-Simmons University) (8th year)
- Mark Coomes (New Mexico State) (2nd year)

Legend

- (C) Team captain
- (S) Suspended
- (I) Ineligible
- (W) Walk-on
- Injured
- Current redshirt

Roster

== Schedule ==
Date time, TV	Rank^{#}	Opponent^{#}	Result	Record	Site (attendance) city, state
Non-Conference regular season
11/28/1986*	No. 14	vs. New Mexico State; BYU-Hawaii Classic	W 67–65	1–0	BYU-Hawaii Campus (450); Laie, HI
11/29/1986*	No. 14	vs. Duke; BYU-Hawaii Classic	W 69–62	2–0	BYU-Hawaii Campus (1,887); Laie, HI
12/4/1986*	No. 9	Chicago State	W 92–78	3–0	Assembly Hall (13,986); Champaign, Illinois
12/6/1986*	No. 9	at No. 12 Pittsburgh	W 99–97	4–0	Civic Arena (6,689); Pittsburgh, Pennsylvania
12/8/1986*	No. 9	Eastern Illinois	W 85–51	5–0	Assembly Hall (13,578); Champaign, Illinois
12/12/1986*	No. 6	Baylor; Illini Classic	W 92–68	6–0	Assembly Hall (13,922); Champaign, Illinois
12/13/1986*	No. 6	Princeton; Illini Classic	W 81–55	7–0	Assembly Hall (14,543); Champaign, Illinois
12/20/1986*	No. 5	at No. 4 North Carolina	L 77–90	7–1	Dean Smith Center (21,444); Chapel Hill, North Carolina
12/23/1986*	No. 9	vs. Missouri; Braggin' Rights	W 92–74	8–1	St. Louis Arena (16,500); St. Louis, Missouri
12/27/1986*	No. 9	at Loyola (Chicago)	L 82–83	8–2	Alumni Gym (9,017); Chicago, Illinois
Big Ten regular season
1/3/1987	No. 16	Michigan	W 95–84	9–2 (1–0)	Assembly Hall (16,468); Champaign, Illinois
1/5/1987	No. 16	Michigan State	W 79–72	10–2 (2–0)	Assembly Hall (13,672); Champaign, Illinois
1/8/1987	No. 12	at Wisconsin	W 68–66	11–2 (3–0)	Wisconsin Field House (8,054); Madison, Wisconsin
1/10/1987	No. 12	at Northwestern; Rivalry	W 76–69	12–2 (4–0)	Welsh-Ryan Arena (8,117); Evanston, Illinois
1/14/1987	No. 8	No. 2 Iowa; Rivalry	L 88–91 ^{OT}	12–3 (4–1)	Assembly Hall (16,666); Champaign, Illinois
1/17/1987	No. 8	Minnesota	W 80–58	13–3 (5–1)	Assembly Hall (13,814); Champaign, Illinois
1/22/1987	No. 9	at No. 5 Purdue	L 86–87 ^{OT}	13–4 (5–2)	Mackey Arena (14,123); West Lafayette, Indiana
1/24/1987*	No. 9	Arizona	W 82–63	14–4	Assembly Hall (15,884); Champaign, Illinois
1/28/1987	No. 12	at No. 4 Indiana; Rivalry	L 66–69	14–5 (5–3)	Assembly Hall (17,249); Bloomington, Indiana
1/31/1987*	No. 12	Colorado	W 69–65	15–5	Assembly Hall (14,596); Champaign, Illinois
2/2/1987	No. 12	at Ohio State	W 93–70	16–5 (6–3)	St. John Arena (14,075); Columbus, Ohio
2/5/1987	No. 14	Northwestern; Rivalry	W 72–43	17–5 (7–3)	Assembly Hall (14,095); Champaign, Illinois
2/7/1987	No. 14	Wisconsin	W 99–74	18–5 (8–3)	Assembly Hall (16,682); Champaign, Illinois
2/12/1987	No. 11	at Minnesota	W 79–67	19–5 (9–3)	Williams Arena (11,183); Minneapolis, Minnesota
2/14/1987	No. 11	at No. 4 Iowa; Rivalry	L 61–66	19–6 (9–4)	Carver–Hawkeye Arena (15,500); Iowa City, IA
2/23/1987	No. 14	No. 6 Purdue	L 75–76 ^{OT}	19–7 (9–5)	Assembly Hall (16,667); Champaign, Illinois
2/25/1987	No. 14	Ohio State	W 93–70	20–7 (10–5)	Assembly Hall (14,075); Champaign, Illinois
3/1/1987	No. 14	No. 3 Indiana; Rivalry	W 69–67	21–7 (11–5)	Assembly Hall (16,793); Champaign, Illinois
3/4/1987	No. 12	at Michigan	W 89–75	22–7 (12–5)	Crisler Arena (13,145); Ann Arbor, Michigan
3/7/1987	No. 12	at Michigan State	W 77–64	23–7 (13–5)	Jenison Fieldhouse (10,004); East Lansing, Michigan
NCAA Tournament
3/12/1987*	(3 SE) No. 11	vs. (14 SE) Austin Peay; First Round	L 67–68	23–8	Birmingham–Jefferson Convention Complex (–); Birmingham, Alabama
*Non-conference game. ^{#}Rankings from AP Poll. (#) Tournament seedings in parentheses. All times are in Central Time.

== Player stats ==
Player	Games Played	Minutes Played	2 pt. Field Goals	3 pt. Field Goals	Free Throws	Rebounds	Assists	Blocks	Steals	Points
Ken Norman	31	1112	255	1	128	303	68	48	37	641
Doug Altenberger	30	996	63	76	55	138	91	6	41	409
Tony Wysinger	30	948	100	28	54	56	192	2	40	338
Lowell Hamilton	31	729	149	0	36	121	28	31	24	334
Glynn Blackwell	31	679	114	6	61	106	64	4	31	307
Jens Kujawa	31	499	53	0	35	109	22	14	14	141
Stephen Bardo	31	630	41	1	34	92	85	15	23	119
Kendall Gill	31	345	40	0	34	42	27	8	39	114
Larry Smith	20	108	12	0	14	13	16	2	6	38
Phil Kunz	23	161	13	0	10	30	3	11	4	36
Olaf Blab	8	15	2	0	2	5	0	2	0	4
Jeff Finke	6	25	1	0	2	5	1	0	1	4
Jim Green	12	16	1	0	1	3	0	1	0	3
Bryan Brickner	2	3	0	0	0	1	1	0	0	0
Dave Wells	4	5	0	0	0	1	0	0	0	0

== Awards and honors ==
- Ken Norman
  - Associated Press 2nd team All-American
  - United States Basketball Writers Association 2nd team All-American
  - National Association of Basketball Coaches 3rd team All-American
  - Team Most Valuable Player
  - Fighting Illini All-Century team (2005)
- Kendall Gill
  - Fighting Illini All-Century team (2005)

== Team players drafted into the NBA ==
Player	NBA club	Round	Pick
Ken Norman	Los Angeles Clippers	1	19
Doug Altenberger	Chicago Bulls	6	125
