= Daryl Thomas =

American basketball player and coach (1965–2018)

- Darryl Thomas

Personal information
- Born: May 25, 1965 Chicago, Illinois, U.S.
- Died: March 28, 2018 (aged 52)
- Listed height: 6 ft 7 in (2.01 m)
- Listed weight: 240 lb (109 kg)

Career information
- High school: St. Joseph (Westchester, Illinois)
- College: Indiana (1983–1987)
- NBA draft: 1987: 4th round, 120th overall pick
- Drafted by: Sacramento Kings
- Position: Power forward / center

Career history

Playing
- 1987–1989: Hemel & Watford Royals
- 1992: Fargo-Moorhead Fever
- 1992–1993: La Crosse Catbirds

Coaching
- 2015–2018: Montini Catholic HS

Career highlights
- NCAA champion (1987); Third-team Parade All-American (1983); McDonald's All-American (1983)
- Stats at Basketball Reference

Daryl Thomas (May 25, 1965 – March 28, 2018) was an American basketball player and coach from Chicago, Illinois.

== High school career ==
Thomas, a 6'7" forward, played high school basketball at Chicago-area St. Joseph High School in Westchester, Illinois, the same school that Isiah Thomas (no relation) had attended. He was both a McDonald's and Parade All-American in 1983.

== College career ==
Thomas was a starter for Indiana University under coach Bobby Knight from 1983 to 1987 scoring 1,095 points. Thomas was co-captain of the Indiana Hoosiers men's basketball team that won the 1987 NCAA Division I men's basketball tournament. Thomas scored 20 points and notably made the pass to Keith Smart, whose buzzer-beating shot gave the Hoosiers a one-point victory over Syracuse. Knight called Thomas' decision to pass the ball to Smart, who had a better shot, "the greatest single play I ever had a kid make."

== Professional career ==
The Sacramento Kings selected Thomas as the 120th pick in the 1987 NBA draft. He did not make the team and instead played professionally for 13 seasons in the UK, Poland and Dominican Republic. He also played one season in the Continental Basketball Association (CBA), splitting time with the Fargo-Moorhead Fever and La Crosse Catbirds in the 1992–93 CBA season.

== Coaching career and death ==
In later years Thomas was a basketball coach at Montini Catholic High School near Chicago. Thomas died of a heart attack on March 28, 2018.
