= Bob Hallberg =

American basketball player and coach (1944–2019)

Biographical details
- Born: February 10, 1944
- Died: November 19, 2019 (aged 75)

Playing career
- ?–?: Chicago State

Coaching career (HC unless noted)
- 1966–1971: Kennedy HS
- 1971–1977: Saint Xavier
- 1977–1987: Chicago State
- 1987–1996: UIC
- 2000–2019: Saint Xavier (women's)

Administrative career (AD unless noted)
- 2001–2019: Saint Xavier

Bob Hallberg (February 10, 1944 – November 19, 2019) was a college basketball coach, and the head coach of the St. Xavier University Women's Basketball team from 2000-2019.

Hallberg's career started at Kennedy High School, where he was the boys coach for five seasons from 1966-1971.

Hallberg then moved on to the college game, where he coached for the rest of his career. From 1971 until 1977, he led the men's basketball team at Saint Xavier and then moved on to his alma-mater, Chicago State University, where he coached from 1977 until 1987.

Hallberg moved to the University of Illinois at Chicago for nine years before coming back to SXU in 2000 and becoming the first coach of the school's newly formed women's basketball program.

In 2016, Hallberg became the first basketball coach at any collegiate level to lead both a men's and women's team to a No. 1 national ranking. Later that season, Hallberg led the Cougars to the NAIA National Championship Game for the first time in team history. In 2019, Hallberg amassed his 500th win as head coach of the program in a 73–44 win at Indiana University South Bend. Hallberg also served as Athletic Director during his time at St. Xavier.

Hallberg died on November 19, 2019, at age 75.

== Coaching Records ==
Here's a look at his basketball career by the numbers - information via SXU Athletics

- 1966-71 Kennedy High School (boys), 93-16 .833
- 1971-77 Saint Xavier College (men), 127-61 .676
- 1977-87 Chicago State University (men), 224-84 .727
- 1987-96 University of Illinois-Chicago (men), 134-128 .511
- 2000-19 Saint Xavier University (women), 502-131 .793

Career Record 1080 - 420 (.720)
