= Clarence Grier =

American basketball player

Personal information
- Born: 1960s Greensboro, North Carolina, U.S.
- Listed height: 6 ft 7 in (2.01 m)
- Listed weight: 190 lb (86 kg)

Career information
- High school: J. B. Dudley (Greensboro, North Carolina)
- College: Campbell (1983–1987)
- NBA draft: 1987: 7th round, 151st overall pick
- Drafted by: Houston Rockets
- Playing career: 1987–1988
- Position: Forward

Career history
- 1987–1988: Quad City Thunder

Career highlights
- Big South Player of the Year (1987); 2× First-team All-Big South (1986, 1987)
- Stats at Basketball Reference

Clarence Grier (born 1960s) is an American former basketball player who was selected by the Houston Rockets in the 1987 NBA draft, although he never ended up playing in the National Basketball Association. He is known for his collegiate career at Campbell University between 1983 and 1987. Grier was the holder of 30 school records at the time of his graduation and was named the Big South Conference Player of the Year as a senior in 1986–87.

Grier played the forward position and is 6'7". The year he was named the Big South's top player, Grier scored a school single season-record 739 points behind a 24.6 points per game average, which ranked 12th nationally. He finished his two-year career with 1,087 points.

After a stint playing for the Continental Basketball Association's Quad City Thunder, Grier retired from basketball and became a Certified Public Accountant in the city of High Point, North Carolina. In 2001, he was inducted into the Campbell University Hall of Fame.
