= Tommy Suitts =

American basketball coach

Biographical details
- Born: November 30, 1947 (age 78)

Playing career
- 1967–1969: Alabama

Coaching career (HC unless noted)
- 1979–1981: Rice (assistant)
- 1981–1987: Rice
- 1987–1990: Chicago State
- 2008–2009: Southeast Missouri State (assistant)

Head coaching record
- Overall: 89–157

Tommy Suitts (born November 30, 1947) is an American college basketball coach. He was the head coach at Rice University from 1981 to 1987 and at Chicago State University from 1987 to 1990.
