= 1986–87 NCAA Division I men's basketball rankings =

- Season: 1986–87
- NCAA Tournament: 1987
- Preseason No. 1: North Carolina
- NCAA Tournament Champions: Indiana
NCAA Division I men's basketball rankings
| |

The 1986–87 NCAA Division I men's basketball rankings was made up of two human polls, the AP Poll and the Coaches Poll, in addition to various other preseason polls.

== Legend ==
| | Increase in ranking |
| | Decrease in ranking |
| | New to rankings from previous week |
| Italics | Number of first place votes |
| (#–#) | Win–loss record |
| т | Tied with team above or below also with this symbol |

== AP Poll ==
| | Preseason Nov 17 | Week 2 Dec 1 | Week 3 Dec 8 | Week 4 Dec 15 | Week 5 Dec. 22 | Week 6 Dec. 29 | Week 7 Jan. 5 | Week 8 Jan. 12 | Week 9 Jan. 19 | Week 10 Jan. 26 | Week 11 Feb. 2 | Week 12 Feb. 9 | Week 13 Feb. 16 | Week 14 Feb. 23 | Week 15 Mar. 2 | Week 16 Mar. 9 | |
|---|---|---|---|---|---|---|---|---|---|---|---|---|---|---|---|---|---|
| 1. | North Carolina | North Carolina (2–0) | UNLV (5–0) | UNLV (6–0) | UNLV (9–0) | UNLV (10–0) | UNLV (12–0) | UNLV (14–0) | Iowa (16–0) | North Carolina (17–1) | UNLV (21–1) | UNLV (23–1) | UNLV (26–1) | UNLV (28–1) | UNLV (30–1) | UNLV (33–1) | 1. |
| 2. | Louisville | UNLV (4–0) | Indiana (3–0) | Purdue (5–0) | Purdue (6–0) | Purdue (7–0) | Iowa (13–0) | Iowa (15–0) | North Carolina (15–1) | Iowa (18–1) | Indiana (17–2) | Indiana (19–2) | Indiana (20–2) | North Carolina (25–2) | North Carolina (27–2) | North Carolina (29–3) | 2. |
| 3. | Indiana | Indiana (1–0) | Purdue (3–0) | Iowa (8–0) | Iowa (9–0) | Iowa (11–0) | North Carolina (11–1) | North Carolina (13–1) | Indiana (14–1) | UNLV (19–1) | North Carolina (18–2) | North Carolina (20–2) | North Carolina (23–2) | Indiana (23–2) | Purdue (23–3) | Indiana (24–4) | 3. |
| 4. | Purdue | Purdue (1–0) | Iowa (6–0) | North Carolina (5–1) | North Carolina (6–1) | North Carolina (8–1) | Indiana (10–1) | Indiana (12–1) | UNLV (15–1) | Indiana (15–2) | Iowa (19–2) | Iowa (21–2) | DePaul (22–1) | DePaul (25–1) | Indiana (23–4) | Georgetown (26–4) | 4. |
| 5. | UNLV | Iowa (3–0) | North Carolina (4–1) | Illinois (7–0) | Auburn (6–0) | Auburn (7–0) | Syracuse (12–0) | Syracuse (14–0) | Purdue (14–1) | Purdue (15–2) | DePaul (18–1) | DePaul (20–1) | Temple (25–2) | Temple (28–2) | DePaul (25–2) | DePaul (26–2) | 5. |
| 6. | Georgia Tech | Kansas (1–0) | Illinois (4–0) | Auburn (4–0) | Oklahoma (6–1) | Indiana (9–1) | Purdue (9–1) | Purdue (12–1) | DePaul (14–0) | Syracuse (17–2) | Temple (20–2) | Temple (23–2) | Purdue (20–3) | Purdue (20–3) | Iowa (25–4) | Iowa (27–4) | 6. |
| 7. | Oklahoma | Auburn (1–0) | Auburn (2–0) | Oklahoma (5–1) | Syracuse (8–0) | Syracuse (10–0) | DePaul (10–0) | DePaul (12–0) | Syracuse (15–1) | Temple (18–2) | Purdue (16–3) | Purdue (18–3) | Iowa (22–3) | Iowa (23–4) | Georgetown (23–4) | Purdue (24–4) | 7. |
| 8. | Kansas | Alabama (1–0) | Western Kentucky (6–1) | Indiana (4–1) | Indiana (6–1) | Georgetown (8–0) | Temple (11–1) | Illinois (12–2) | Temple (16–2) | DePaul (16–1) | Oklahoma (17–3) | Oklahoma (19–3) | Pittsburgh (21–4) | Georgetown (21–4) | Temple (29–3) | Temple (31–3) | 8. |
| 9. | Navy | Illinois (2–0) | Oklahoma (3–1) | Syracuse (7–0) | Illinois (7–1) | Navy (5–1) | Kentucky (7–2) | Georgetown (12–1) | Illinois (13–3) | Alabama (15–2) | Alabama (16–3) | Syracuse (19–3) | Syracuse (20–4) | Pittsburgh (22–5) | Alabama (23–4) | Alabama (26–4) | 9. |
| 10. | Iowa | Navy (2–1) | Navy (3–1) | Georgetown (5–0) | Georgetown (7–0) | St. John's (8–0) | St. John's (9–1) | Auburn (9–2) | Clemson (16–0) | Oklahoma (14–3) | Georgetown (15–3) | Pittsburgh (19–4) | Clemson (23–2) | Alabama (21–4) | Syracuse (24–5) | Syracuse (26–6) | 10. |
| 11. | Kentucky | Oklahoma (1–1) | UCLA (3–0) | Navy (4–1) | NC State (7–1) | Kentucky (6–1) | Oklahoma (9–2) | Temple (14–2) | Oklahoma (12–3) | Georgetown (14–2) | Syracuse (17–3) | Illinois (18–5) | Georgetown (19–4) | Syracuse (22–5) | Pittsburgh (23–6) | Illinois (23–7) | 11. |
| 12. | Auburn | Pittsburgh (1–0) | Syracuse (4–0) | NC State (6–1) | Navy (4–1) | Kansas (6–2) | Illinois (9–2) | Clemson (14–0) | Duke (13–2) | Illinois (14–4) | Clemson (19–2) | Clemson (21–2) | Alabama (19–4) | Oklahoma (21–5) | Illinois (21–7) | Pittsburgh (24–7) | 12. |
| 13. | Alabama | Kentucky (1–0) | Georgetown (4–0) | Kansas (4–1) | Kansas (5–1) | Oklahoma (7–2) | Auburn (7–2) | St. John's (10–2) | Alabama (13–2) | Duke (14–3) | Pittsburgh (17–4) | Georgetown (16–4) | Oklahoma (19–5) | Clemson (24–3) | Clemson (25–4) | Clemson (25–5) | 13. |
| 14. | Illinois | Western Kentucky (3–1) | Kansas (3–1) | Pittsburgh (4–1) | Pittsburgh (5–1) | Temple (8–1) | Pittsburgh (9–2) | Duke (11–2) | St. John's (12–2) | Clemson (17–1) | Illinois (15–5) | Alabama (17–4) | Illinois (19–6) | Illinois (19–6) | Duke (22–7) | Missouri (24–9) | 14. |
| 15. | Syracuse | Georgia Tech (1–1) | NC State (5–1) | St. John's (6–0) | St. John's (7–0) | DePaul (8–0) | Navy (6–2) | Alabama (10–2) | Georgetown (12–2) | St. John's (13–3) | TCU (18–3) | Duke (19–4) | Kansas (19–6) | TCU (22–4) | TCU (23–5) | UCLA (24–6) | 15. |
| 16. | Pittsburgh | Georgetown (2–0) | Georgia Tech (3–1) | Georgia Tech (3–2) | Temple (8–1) | Illinois (8–2) | Georgetown (9–1) | Oklahoma (10–3) | Pittsburgh (13–3) | TCU (16–3) | Duke (16–4) | St. John's (18–4) | TCU (20–4) | Kansas (21–7) | New Orleans (25–3) | New Orleans (25–3) | 16. |
| 17. | NC State | Syracuse (1–0) | Pittsburgh (2–1) | UCLA (3–1) | DePaul (7–0) | Pittsburgh (6–2) | Duke (9–1) | NC State (10–3) | Auburn (10–3) | Pittsburgh (14–4) | Providence (16–3) | Kansas (18–5) | Duke (20–5) | Duke (21–6) | Oklahoma (21–8) | Duke (22–8) | 17. |
| 18. | Georgetown | NC State (3–1) | Alabama (2–1) | Kentucky (3–1) | Kentucky (5–1) | Georgia Tech (6–2) | NC State (9–2) | Pittsburgh (11–3) | Navy (11–3) | Auburn (11–4) | Kansas (15–5) | TCU (19–4) | Florida (20–6) | Florida (21–7) | UCLA (21–6) | Notre Dame (22–7) | 18. |
| 19. | Arizona | Northeastern (2–1) | Kentucky (2–1) | DePaul (5–0) | Georgia Tech (5–2) | NC State (7–2) | Kansas (7–2) | Navy (9–3) | TCU (13–3) | Florida (15–4) | St. John's (14–4) | Florida (18–5) | Providence (17–5) | New Orleans (22–3) | Missouri (21–9) | TCU (23–6) | 19. |
| 20. | Cleveland State | Arizona (0–1) | Arkansas (4–0) | Temple (7–1) | Florida (8–1) | Duke (6–1) | Clemson (11–0) | Kansas (9–4) | NC State (11–4) | Kansas (13–5) | Auburn (12–6) | Providence (16–5) | St. John's (17–5) | Providence (18–6) | Notre Dame (19–7) | Kansas (23–10) | 20. |
| | Preseason Nov 17 | Week 2 Dec 1 | Week 3 Dec 8 | Week 4 Dec 15 | Week 5 Dec. 22 | Week 6 Dec. 29 | Week 7 Jan. 5 | Week 8 Jan. 12 | Week 9 Jan. 19 | Week 10 Jan. 26 | Week 11 Feb. 2 | Week 12 Feb. 9 | Week 13 Feb. 16 | Week 14 Feb. 23 | Week 15 Mar. 2 | Week 16 Mar. 9 | |
| | | Dropped: Louisville (0–3); Cleveland State (0–1) | Dropped: Arizona (2–2); Northeastern (3–3) | Dropped: Western Kentucky (7–3); Alabama (3–2); Arkansas (5–1) | Dropped: UCLA (3–4) | Dropped: Florida (9–3) | Dropped: Georgia Tech (7–3) | Dropped: Kentucky (7–4) | Dropped: Kansas (10–5) | Dropped: Navy (12–5); NC State (12–4) | Dropped: Florida (16–5) | Dropped: Auburn (12–8) | Dropped: None | Dropped: St. John's (19–6) | Dropped: Kansas (20–9); Florida (21–9); Providence (20–7) | Dropped: Oklahoma (22–9) | |

== Coaches Poll ==
| | Week 1 Dec 2 | Week 2 Dec 9 | Week 3 Dec 16 | Week 4 Dec. 23 | Week 5 Dec. 30 | Week 6 Jan. 6 | Week 7 Jan. 13 | Week 8 Jan. 20 | Week 9 Jan. 27 | Week 10 Feb. 3 | Week 11 Feb. 10 | Week 12 Feb. 17 | Week 13 Feb. 24 | Week 14 Mar. 3 | Week 15 Mar. 10 | |
|---|---|---|---|---|---|---|---|---|---|---|---|---|---|---|---|---|
| 1. | North Carolina (2–0) | UNLV (5–0) | UNLV (6–0) | UNLV (9–0) | UNLV (10–0) | UNLV (12–0) | UNLV (14–0) | North Carolina (15–1) | North Carolina (17–1) | UNLV (21–1) | UNLV (23–1) | UNLV (26–1) | UNLV (28–1) | UNLV (30–1) | UNLV (33–1) | 1. |
| 2. | UNLV (4–0) | Indiana (3–0) | Purdue (5–0) | Purdue (6–0) | Purdue (7–0) | North Carolina (11–1) | Iowa (15–0) | Iowa (16–0) | UNLV (19–1) | Indiana (17–2) | Indiana (19–2) | Indiana (20–2) | Indiana (23–2) | North Carolina (27–2) | Indiana (24–4) | 2. |
| 3. | Indiana (1–0) | Iowa (6–0) | North Carolina (5–1) | Iowa (9–0) | North Carolina (8–1) | Iowa (13–0) | North Carolina (13–1) | UNLV (15–1) | Iowa (18–1) | North Carolina (18–2) | North Carolina (20–2) | North Carolina (23–2) | North Carolina (25–2) | Purdue (23–3) | North Carolina (29–3) | 3. |
| 4. | Purdue (1–0) | Purdue (3–0) | Iowa (8–0) | North Carolina (6–1) | Iowa (11–0) | Indiana (10–1) | Indiana (12–1) | Indiana (14–1) | Indiana (15–2) | Iowa (19–2) | Iowa (21–2) | Iowa (22–3) | Temple (28–2) | Indiana (23–4) | Georgetown (26–4) | 4. |
| 5. | Kansas (1–0) | North Carolina (4–1) | Illinois (7–0) | Auburn (6–0) | Indiana (9–1) | Purdue (9–1) | Purdue (12–1) | Purdue (14–1) | Purdue (15–2) | Temple (20–2) | DePaul (20–1) | DePaul (22–1) | DePaul (25–1) | DePaul (25–2) | DePaul (26–2) | 5. |
| 6. | Iowa (3–0) | Illinois (4–0) | Indiana (4–1) | Indiana (6–1) | Auburn (7–0) | Syracuse (12–0) | Syracuse (14–0) | DePaul (14–0) | Syracuse (17–2) | Purdue (16–3) | Purdue (18–3) | Purdue (20–3) | Purdue (20–3) | Iowa (25–4) | Purdue (24–4) | 6. |
| 7. | Alabama (1–0) | UCLA (3–0) | Auburn (4–0) | Syracuse (8–0) | Syracuse (10–0) | Temple (11–1) | DePaul (12–0) | Syracuse (15–1) | Temple (18–2) | DePaul (18–1) | Temple (23–2) | Temple (25–2) | Georgetown (21–4) | Georgetown (23–4) | Iowa (27–4) | 7. |
| 8. | Auburn (1–0) | Auburn (2–0) | Georgetown (5–0) | Oklahoma (6–1) | Georgetown (8–0) | Kentucky (7–2) | Georgetown (12–1) | Temple (16–2) | DePaul (16–1) | Oklahoma (17–3) | Oklahoma (19–3) | Pittsburgh (21–4) | Iowa (23–4) | Temple (29–3) | Temple (31–3) | 8. |
| 9. | Oklahoma (1–1) | Kansas (3–1) | Oklahoma (5–1) | Georgetown (7–0) | Kentucky (6–1) | DePaul (10–0) | Auburn (9–2) | Oklahoma (12–3) | Oklahoma (14–3) | Alabama (16–3) | Syracuse (19–3) | Syracuse (20–4) | Pittsburgh (22–5) | Alabama (23–4) | Alabama (26–4) | 9. |
| 10. | Western Kentucky (3–1) | Western Kentucky (6–1) | Syracuse (7–0) | Illinois (7–1) | Navy (5–1) | Oklahoma (9–2) | Illinois (12–2) | Illinois (13–3) | Alabama (15–2) | Georgetown (15–3) | Georgetown (16–4) | Clemson (23–2) | Alabama (21–4) | Pittsburgh (23–6) | Syracuse (26–6) | 10. |
| 11. | Pittsburgh (1–0) | Georgetown (4–0) | Kansas (4–1) | Kansas (5–1) | St. John's (8–0) | Auburn (7–2) | Temple (14–2) | Alabama (13–2) | Duke (14–3) | Syracuse (17–3) | Clemson (21–2) | Alabama (19–4) | Syracuse (22–5) | Syracuse (24–5) | Illinois (23–7) | 11. |
| 12. | Georgetown (2–0) | Syracuse (4–0) | Navy (4–1) | Navy (4–1) | Oklahoma (7–2) | St. John's (9–1) | Clemson (14–0) | Clemson (16–0) | Illinois (14–4) | TCU (18–3) | Illinois (18–5) | Georgetown (19–4) | Clemson (24–3) | Illinois (21–7) | Pittsburgh (24–7) | 12. |
| 13. | Syracuse (1–0) | Oklahoma (3–1) | Pittsburgh (4–1) | NC State (7–1) | Illinois (8–2) | Illinois (9–2) | Duke (11–2) | Duke (13–2) | Georgetown (14–2) | Clemson (19–2) | Pittsburgh (19–4) | Illinois (19–6) | Illinois (19–6) | TCU (23–5) | UCLA (24–6) | 13. |
| 14. | Navy (2–1) | Navy (3–1) | St. John's (6–0) | Pittsburgh (5–1) | Kansas (6–2) | Navy (6–2) | St. John's (10–2) | St. John's (12–2) | Clemson (17–1) | Illinois (15–5) | Alabama (17–4) | Kansas (19–6) | Oklahoma (21–5) | Clemson (25–4) | Missouri (24–9) | 14. |
| 15. | Illinois (2–0) | Arkansas (4–0) | NC State (6–1) | DePaul (7–0) | Temple (8–1) | Pittsburgh (9–2) | Alabama (10–2) | Auburn (10–3) | TCU (16–3) | Duke (16–4) | TCU (19–4) | TCU (20–4) | TCU (22–4) | Duke (22–7) | Clemson (25–5) | 15. |
| 16. | Kentucky (1–0) | Alabama (2–1) | UCLA (3–1) | St. John's (7–0) | DePaul (8–0) | Duke (9–1) | Oklahoma (10–3) | Georgetown (12–2) | Florida (15–4) | Pittsburgh (17–4) | Duke (19–4) | Oklahoma (19–5) | Kansas (21–7) | UCLA (21–6) | TCU (23–6) | 16. |
| 17. | UCLA (2–0) | Pittsburgh (2–1) | DePaul (5–0) т | Temple (8–1) | Pittsburgh (6–2) | Georgetown (9–1) | NC State (10–3) | Pittsburgh (13–3) | Auburn (11–4) | Kansas (15–5) | Kansas (18–5) | Florida (20–6) | Florida (21–7) | Oklahoma (21–8) | Wyoming (22–9) | 17. |
| 18. | Louisville (0–3) | NC State (5–1) | Arkansas (5–1) т | Kentucky (5–1) | Duke (6–1) | Kansas (7–2) | Pittsburgh (11–3) | TCU (13–3) | St. John's (13–3) | Providence (16–3) | St. John's (18–4) | Duke (20–5) | UTEP (21–5) | Notre Dame (19–7) | Notre Dame (22–7) | 18. |
| 19. | NC State (3–1) | Kentucky (2–1) т | Temple (7–1) | Florida (8–1) | Cal State Fullerton (7–1) | TCU (10–3) | TCU (12–3) | Navy (11–3) | Pittsburgh (14–4) | Florida (16–5) | Florida (18–5) | UTEP (20–5) | Duke (21–6) | New Orleans (25–3) т | New Orleans (25–3) т UTEP (24–6) т | 19. |
| 20. | Temple (3–1) | Wyoming (3–0) т | Kentucky (3–1) | Duke (5–1) т Cal State Fullerton (6–1) т | TCU (9–3) | NC State (9–2) | Navy (9–3) | Kansas (10–5) | Kansas (13–5) | Auburn (12–6) | UTEP (18–5) | New Orleans (20–3) т Wyoming (18–6) т | UCLA (19–6) | Kansas (20–9) т | Oklahoma (22–9) т | 20. |
| | Week 1 Dec 2 | Week 2 Dec 9 | Week 3 Dec 16 | Week 4 Dec. 23 | Week 5 Dec. 30 | Week 6 Jan. 6 | Week 7 Jan. 13 | Week 8 Jan. 20 | Week 9 Jan. 27 | Week 10 Feb. 3 | Week 11 Feb. 10 | Week 12 Feb. 17 | Week 13 Feb. 24 | Week 14 Mar. 3 | Week 15 Mar. 10 | |
| | | Dropped: Louisville (2–3); Temple (6–1) | Dropped: Western Kentucky (7–3); Alabama (3–2); Wyoming (3–2) | Dropped: UCLA (3–4); Arkansas (6–3) | Dropped: Florida (9–3) | Dropped: Cal State Fullerton (7–3) | Dropped: Kentucky (7–4) | Dropped: NC State (11–4) | Dropped: Navy (12–5) | Dropped: St. John's (14–4) | Dropped: Providence (16–5) | Dropped: None | Dropped: New Orleans (22–3); Wyoming (18–7) | Dropped: Florida (21–9); UTEP (22–5) | Dropped: Duke (22–8); Kansas (23–10) | |
