= Southern Miss Golden Eagles basketball statistical leaders =

The Southern Miss Golden Eagles basketball statistical leaders are individual statistical leaders of the Southern Miss Golden Eagles basketball program in various categories, including points, assists, blocks, rebounds, and steals. Within those areas, the lists identify single-game, single-season, and career leaders. The Golden Eagles represent the University of Southern Mississippi in the NCAA Division I Sun Belt Conference.

Southern Miss began competing in intercollegiate basketball in 1912. However, the school's record book does not generally list records from before the 1950s, as records from before this period are often incomplete and inconsistent. Since scoring was much lower in this era, and teams played much fewer games during a typical season, it is likely that few or no players from this era would appear on these lists anyway.

The NCAA did not officially record assists as a stat until the 1983–84 season, and blocks and steals until the 1985–86 season, but Southern Miss's record books includes players in these stats before these seasons. These lists are updated through the end of the 2020–21 season.

== Scoring ==
Career
Rk	Player	Points	Seasons
1	Nick Revon	2,136	1950–51 1951–52 1952–53 1953–54
2	Clarence Weatherspoon	2,130	1988–89 1989–90 1990–91 1991–92
3	Tom Bishop	1,932	1949–50 1950–51 1951–52 1952–53
4	Joe Dawson	1,695	1978–79 1979–80 1980–81 1981–82
5	Jeremy Wise	1,691	2006–07 2007–08 2008–09
6	Darrin Chancellor	1,670	1987–88 1988–89 1989–90 1990–91
7	Randolph Keys	1,626	1984–85 1985–86 1986–87 1987–88
8	Casey Fisher	1,601	1984–85 1985–86 1986–87 1987–88
9	Glen Whisby	1,598	1991–92 1992–93 1993–94 1994–95
10	Bernard Haslett	1,596	1990–91 1991–92 1992–93 1993–94

Season
Rk	Player	Points	Season
1	Nick Revon	737	1953–54
2	Tylik Weeks	671	2025–26
3	Clarence Weatherspoon	647	1991–92
4	Nick Revon	629	1951–52
5	Jeremy Wise	617	2007–08
6	Tom Bishop	598	1950–51
7	Ronnie Malonne	597	1973–74
8	Bernard Haslett	593	1993–94
9	Gary Flowers	582	2010–11
10	Derrick Hamilton	574	1987–88

Single game
Rk	Player	Points	Season	Opponent
1	Berlin Ladner	45	1967–68	Samford
2	Damien Smith	41	1995–96	Ole Miss
	John White	41	1987–88	Virginia Tech
	Jerome Arnold	41	1978–79	UMKC
5	Mike Coleman	40	1974–75	Centenary
	Kourtlin Jackson	40	2015–16	Marshall
7	Mike Coleman	38	1974–75	Milwaukee
	Mike Coleman	38	1974–75	Georgia Southern
	Danny Thornsberry	38	1971–72	Ole Miss
	Wendell Ladner	38	1967–68	Northwestern State

== Rebounds ==
Career
Rk	Player	Rebounds	Seasons
1	Clarence Weatherspoon	1,317	1988–89 1989–90 1990–91 1991–92
2	Wendell Ladner	1,256	1967–68 1968–69 1969–70
3	Gary Hannan	1,191	1963–64 1964–65 1965–66 1966–67
4	Joe Dawson	1,069	1978–79 1979–80 1980–81 1981–82
5	Glen Whisby	1,009	1991–92 1992–93 1993–94 1994–95
6	Kelly McCarty	850	1994–95 1995–96 1996–97 1997–98
7	Bob Kinney	796	1955–56 1956–57
8	Vandarel Jones	734	1997–98 1998–99 1999–00 2000–01
9	Randolph Keys	721	1984–85 1985–86 1986–87 1987–88
10	Robert Boothe	715	1954–55 1955–56 1956–57 1957–58

Season
Rk	Player	Rebounds	Season
1	Wendell Ladner	436	1969–70
2	Wendell Ladner	411	1968–69
3	Wendell Ladner	409	1967–68
4	Bob Kinney	404	1955–56
5	Bob Kinney	392	1956–57
6	Clarence Weatherspoon	371	1989–90
7	Clarence Weatherspoon	352	1990–91
8	Denijay Harris	338	2024–25
9	Gary Hannan	331	1964–65
10	Ben Gantt	315	1960–61

Single game
Rk	Player	Rebounds	Season	Opponent
1	Wendell Ladner	32	1969–70	Pan American
2	Wendell Ladner	31	1969–70	Old Dominion
3	Wendell Ladner	30	1968–69	Louisville
4	Wendell Ladner	29	1969–70	Chattanooga
	Wendell Ladner	29	1967–68	Northwestern State
6	Wendell Ladner	28	1967–68	Louisiana Tech
7	Wendell Ladner	27	1969–70	New Orleans
8	Mike Coleman	26	1974–75	Wisconsin-Milwaukee
9	Wendell Ladner	25	1969–70	West Florida
	Wendell Ladner	25	1968–69	Louisiana Tech
	Wendell Ladner	25	1967–68	Delta State

== Assists ==
Career
Rk	Player	Assists	Seasons
1	Casey Fisher	612	1984–85 1985–86 1986–87 1987–88
2	Neil Watson	473	2011–12 2012–13 2013–14
3	Tyree Griffin	434	2017–18 2018–19
4	Dante Stiggers	418	2001–02 2002–03 2003–04 2004–05
5	Mel Cauthen	399	1997–98 1998–99 1999–00 2000–01
6	Curtis Green	386	1980–81 1981–82 1982–83 1983–84
7	Jeremy Wise	381	2006–07 2007–08 2008–09
8	Randy Pettus	379	1986–87 1987–88 1988–89
9	Cortez Edwards	368	2015–16 2016–17 2017–18 2018–19
10	Damien Smith	341	1993–94 1994–95 1995–96 1996–97

Season
Rk	Player	Assists	Season
1	Tyree Griffin	233	2018–19
2	Dallas Dale	222	1991–92
3	Tyree Griffin	201	2017–18
4	Casey Fisher	200	1986–87
5	Steve Greene	182	1973–74
6	Russell Johnson	180	1989–90
7	Neil Watson	177	2012–13
8	Randy Pettus	154	1987–88
9	Neil Watson	151	2011–12
	Casey Fisher	151	1987–88

Single game
Rk	Player	Assists	Season	Opponent
1	Neil Watson	17	2012–13	Dillard
2	Casey Fisher	16	1985–86	Oregon Tech
3	Tyree Griffin	15	2018–19	Marshall
4	Kenny Siler	14	1985–86	Florida State
	Steve Greene	14	1972–73	Louisiana-Lafayette
6	Terry Cameron	13	1992–93	Old Dominion
	Carey Martin	13	1992–93	Virginia Tech
	Dallas Dale	13	1991–92	USF
	Casey Fisher	13	1987–88	Virginia Tech
	Casey Fisher	13	1986–87	Samford
	Steve Fields	13	1977–78	UNC-Asheville

== Steals ==
Career
Rk	Player	Steals	Seasons
1	Cortez Edwards	200	2015–16 2016–17 2017–18 2018–19
2	Curtis Green	193	1980–81 1981–82 1982–83 1983–84
3	Casey Fisher	183	1984–85 1985–86 1986–87 1987–88
4	Neil Watson	160	2011–12 2012–13 2013–14
5	Clarence Weatherspoon	155	1988–89 1989–90 1990–91 1991–92
6	Dante Stiggers	150	2001–02 2002–03 2003–04 2004–05
7	Derrick Hamilton	147	1984–85 1985–86 1986–87 1987–88
8	John White	146	1984–85 1985–86 1986–87 1987–88
9	Damien Smith	141	1993–94 1994–95 1995–96 1996–97
	Courtney Beasley	141	2005–06 2006–07 2007–08 2008–09

Season
Rk	Player	Steals	Season
1	Cortez Edwards	71	2017–18
2	Cortez Edwards	68	2018–19
3	Tyree Griffin	65	2018–19
4	Neil Watson	64	2012–13
5	Austin Crowley	63	2022–23
6	Tyree Griffin	59	2017–18
	Casey Fisher	59	1985–86
8	Curtis Green	58	1982–83
	Kenny Smith	58	1979–80
10	Neil Watson	57	2013–14

Single game
Rk	Player	Steals	Season	Opponent
1	Neil Watson	8	2012–13	William Carey
	Edgar Eason	8	1981–82	Pomona-Pitzer
3	Tyree Griffin	7	2018–19	North Texas
	Kourtlin Jackson	7	2015–16	UAB
	Jason Forte	7	2005–06	Tulane
	Dante Stiggers	7	2004–05	Alcorn State
	Curtis Green	7	1982–83	Florida State
	Willie Brown	7	1985–86	Louisville
	Edgar Eason	7	1981–82	Missouri-St. Louis

== Blocks ==
Career
Rk	Player	Blocks	Seasons
1	Clarence Weatherspoon	227	1988–89 1989–90 1990–91 1991–92
2	Glen Whisby	222	1991–92 1992–93 1993–94 1994–95
3	Vandarel Jones	175	1997–98 1998–99 1999–00 2000–01
4	Carlos Booker	131	1998–99 1999–00
5	Kelly McCarty	127	1994–95 1995–96 1996–97 1997–98
6	Daron Jenkins	121	1989–90 1990–91
7	Gary Flowers	104	2009–10 2010–11
8	Ronald Jackson	102	1979–80 1980–81
9	Gjio Bain	100	2006–07 2007–08
10	Willie Brown	92	1985–86 1986–87 1987–88 1988–89

Season
Rk	Player	Blocks	Season
1	Daron Jenkins	86	1989–90
2	Clarence Weatherspoon	78	1991–92
3	Vandarel Jones	77	2000–01
4	Victor Iwuakor	74	2023–24
5	Carlos Booker	73	1999–00
6	Glen Whisby	67	1994–95
7	Glen Whisby	61	1992–93
8	Clarence Weatherspoon	60	1990–91
	Gary Flowers	60	2009–10
	Ronald Jackson	60	1979–80

Single game
Rk	Player	Blocks	Season	Opponent
1	Daron Jenkins	10	1989–90	Auburn
	Ronald Jackson	10	1979–80	Mercer
3	Glen Whisby	9	1991–92	Louisville
4	Gjio Bain	8	2007–08	Belhaven
	Vandarel Jones	8	2000–01	USF
	Carlos Booker	8	1999–00	New Orleans
	Clarence Weatherspoon	8	1991–92	USF
	Clarence Weatherspoon	8	1991–92	South Alabama
9	Gary Flowers	7	2009–10	New Orleans
	Glen Whisby	7	1992–93	Virginia Tech
	Daron Jenkins	7	1989–90	New Orleans
	Daron Jenkins	7	1989–90	Northwestern State
