= M. K. Turk =

American basketball player and coach (1942–2013)

Biographical details
- Born: May 20, 1942; Bardwell, Kentucky, U.S.
- Died: December 6, 2013 (aged 71); Hattiesburg, Mississippi, U.S.

Playing career
- 1960–1962: Copiah–Lincoln JC
- 1963–1964: Livingston State

Coaching career (HC unless noted)
- 1964–1965: Livingston State (grad. asst.)
- 1965–1967: Cobb County HS (GA)
- 1967–1968: Livingston (asst.)
- 1968–1974: Copiah–Lincoln JC
- 1974–1976: Memphis State (asst.)
- 1976–1996: Southern Miss

Administrative career (AD unless noted)
- 1968–1974: Copiah–Lincoln JC

Head coaching record
- Overall: 300–267 (.529) (college)
- Tournaments: 0–2 (NCAA Division I); 6–5 (NIT)

Accomplishments and honors

Championships
- NIT (1987); 2 MACJC regular season (1973, 1974); Metro regular season (1991)

Awards
- Metro Coach of the Year (1986)

M. K. Turk (May 20, 1942 – December 6, 2013) was an American college basketball player and coach.

A native of Bardwell, Kentucky, Turk played basketball at Carlisle County High School from 1957 to 1960. He was the junior captain and an all-state JUCO player at Copiah-Lincoln Community College from 1960 to 1962. Turk later played for Livingston University in the now-defunct Alabama Collegiate Conference from 1963 to 1964. He was the lead scorer on his team. Livingston University named him Most Valuable Player and Most Outstanding Athlete. He was also recognized by Who's Who Among Students in American Universities and Colleges.

After his graduation, he was the graduate assistant coach for Livingston University from 1964 to 1965. From 1965 to 1967, he coached at Cobb County High School in Cobb County, Georgia. He returned to Livingston University to be the assistant coach from 1967 to 1968. From 1968 to 1974, he was the athletic director and head basketball coach at Copiah-Lincoln Community College. His team was named third in the nation and were Region VII champions in 1973. The National Junior College Athletic Association named him the Regional Coach of the Year in 1973. He then acted as the assistant basketball coach at Memphis State University from 1974 to 1976.

He was head coach of the University of Southern Mississippi Golden Eagles from 1976 to 1996. In 1986, he was named the Metro Conference Coach of the Year. He appeared at the National Invitation Tournament (NIT) six times and took the championship in 1987. The same year, he was named the NIT Coach of the Year. He appeared at the NCAA Men's Division I Basketball Championship in 1990 and 1991. In 1991, the team was ranked among the top 25 college basketball teams in the United States, and Mississippi sportswriters named him Coach of the Year. The team won the Metro Conference Tournament championship in 1995. During his time coaching at Southern Mississippi, his teams accumulated a total of 300 wins and 267 losses, making him the winningest men's basketball coach in the history of the school.

In 1981, Turk was inducted to the Livingston University Athletic Hall of Fame, and then to the Copiah-Lincoln Community College Athletic Hall of Fame in 1987. In 1991, he was inducted to the Southern Mississippi Athletic Hall of Fame. In 2005, Turk was inducted to the Mississippi Sports Hall of Fame. Turk died on December 6, 2013, at the age of 71. He was survived by his wife, Katrina, and their two daughters.

== Head coaching record ==
=== College ===
Record table
Season	Team	Overall	Conference	Standing	Postseason
Southern Miss Golden Eagles (NCAA Division I Independent) (1976–1982)
1976–77	Southern Miss	11–16			
1977–78	Southern Miss	13–12			
1978–79	Southern Miss	13–14			
1979–80	Southern Miss	17–10			
1980–81	Southern Miss	20–7			NIT First Round
1981–82	Southern Miss	15–11			
Southern Miss Golden Eagles (Metro Conference) (1982–1995)
1982–83	Southern Miss	14–14	3–9	6th	
1983–84	Southern Miss	13–15	4–10	7th	
1984–85	Southern Miss	7–21	3–11	8th	
1985–86	Southern Miss	17–12	6–6	4th	NIT First Round
1986–87	Southern Miss	23–11	6–6	T–3rd	NIT Champion
1987–88	Southern Miss	19–11	5–7	6th	NIT Second Round
1988–89	Southern Miss	10–17	2–10	T–6th	
1989–90	Southern Miss	20–12	9–5	T–2nd	NCAA Division I First Round
1990–91	Southern Miss	21–8	10–4	1st	NCAA Division I First Round
1991–92	Southern Miss	13–16	5–7	T–5th	
1992–93	Southern Miss	10–17	6–6	T–4th	
1993–94	Southern Miss	15–15	5–7	T–5th	NIT First Round
1994–95	Southern Miss	17–13	6–6	T–4th	NIT First Round
Southern Miss Golden Eagles (Conference USA) (1995–1996)
1995–96	Southern Miss	12–15	6–8	T–2nd (Red)	
Southern Miss:		300–267 (.529)	76–102 (.427)		
Total:		300–267 (.529)			
National champion Postseason invitational champion Conference regular season champion Conference regular season and conference tournament champion Division regular season champion Division regular season and conference tournament champion Conference tournament champion
