= 1986–87 Southern Miss Golden Eagles basketball team =

American college basketball season

1986–87 Southern Miss Golden Eagles men's basketball

NIT, Champions
- Conference: Metro Conference (1975–1995)
- Record: 23–11 (6–6 Metro)
- Head coach: M. K. Turk (11th season)
- Home arena: Reed Green Coliseum

1986–87 Metro Conference men's basketball standings
	Conf.				Overall
Team	W		L	PCT	W		L	PCT
Louisville	9	–	3	.750	18	–	14	.563
Memphis State †	8	–	4	.667	26	–	8	.765
Southern Miss	6	–	6	.500	23	–	11	.676
Florida State	6	–	6	.500	19	–	11	.633
South Carolina	5	–	7	.417	15	–	14	.517
Virginia Tech	5	–	7	.417	10	–	18	.357
Cincinnati	3	–	9	.250	12	–	16	.429
† 1987 Metro Conference tournament winner Rankings from AP Poll

The 1986–87 Southern Miss Golden Eagles basketball team represented University of Southern Mississippi in the 1986–87 college basketball season.

== Roster ==
1986–87 Southern Miss Golden Eagles men's basketball team
Players
Coaches

Pos.	#	Name	Height	Weight	Year	Hometown
F		Randolph Keys	6 ft 7 in (2.01 m)	195 lb (88 kg)	Jr	Collins, Mississippi
F		Derreck Hamilton	6 ft 7 in (2.01 m)	225 lb (102 kg)	Jr	Mobile, Alabama
G		Casey Fisher	6 ft 2 in (1.88 m)	—	Jr
F		John White	6 ft 7 in (2.01 m)	—	Jr
G		Kenny Siler	6 ft 3 in (1.91 m)	—	Sr
G		Randy Pettus	6 ft 0 in (1.83 m)	—	So
F		Jurado Hinton	6 ft 6 in (1.98 m)	—	So
C		Willie Brown	6 ft 7 in (2.01 m)	—	So
G		Jimmy Smith	6 ft 5 in (1.96 m)	—	So
C		John Brown	6 ft 8 in (2.03 m)	—	So
F		Allen Chapman	6 ft 6 in (1.98 m)	—	So
G		Jay Ladner	6 ft 1 in (1.85 m)	—	So	Hattiesburg, Mississippi
F		D. J. Bowe	6 ft 7 in (2.01 m)	—	So

Head coach

- M. K. Turk

Assistant coach(es)

Legend

- (C) Team captain
- (S) Suspended
- (I) Ineligible
- (W) Walk-on
- Injured
- Current redshirt

Roster

== Schedule and results ==
Date time, TV	Rank^{#}	Opponent^{#}	Result	Record	Site city, state
Non-conference regular season
Dec 1, 1986*		Northeast Louisiana	W 84–69	1–0	Reed Green Coliseum; Hattiesburg, Mississippi
Dec 8, 1986*		vs. Arkansas State	L 72–85	1–1	Pine Bluff, Arkansas
Dec 11, 1986*		South Alabama	W 101–80	2–1	Reed Green Coliseum; Hattiesburg, Mississippi
Dec 13, 1986*		Central Arkansas	W 95–82	3–1	Reed Green Coliseum; Hattiesburg, Mississippi
Dec 15, 1986*		UC Riverside	W 87–66	4–1	Reed Green Coliseum; Hattiesburg, Mississippi
Dec 18, 1986*		Georgia College	W 100–87	5–1	Reed Green Coliseum; Hattiesburg, Mississippi
Dec 20, 1986*		North Texas	W 92–58	6–1	Reed Green Coliseum; Hattiesburg, Mississippi
Dec 22, 1986*		at Tennessee Tech	W 90–77	7–1	Hooper Eblen Center; Cookeville, Tennessee
Dec 27, 1986*		Illinois Wesleyan	W 92–90	8–1	Reed Green Coliseum; Hattiesburg, Mississippi
Dec 29, 1986*		vs. Samford; Tennessee-Chattanooga Classic	W 87–77 ^{OT}	9–1	McKenzie Arena; Chattanooga, Tennessee
Dec 30, 1986*		at Chattanooga; Tennessee-Chattanooga Classic	L 70–75	9–2	McKenzie Arena; Chattanooga, Tennessee
Metro Conference regular season
Jan 5, 1987		at Cincinnati	W 73–51	10–2 (1–0)	Riverfront Coliseum; Cincinnati, Ohio
Jan 7, 1987		at South Carolina	L 58–66	10–3 (1–1)	Carolina Coliseum; Columbia, South Carolina
Jan 14, 1987		Louisville	W 76–69	11–3 (2–1)	Reed Green Coliseum; Hattiesburg, Mississippi
Jan 17, 1987		at Virginia Tech	L 72–85	11–4 (2–2)	Cassell Coliseum; Blacksburg, Virginia
Jan 22, 1987*		Jackson State	W 79–68	12–4	Reed Green Coliseum; Hattiesburg, Mississippi
Jan 24, 1987		Florida State	L 74–94	12–5 (2–3)	Reed Green Coliseum; Hattiesburg, Mississippi
Jan 26, 1987*		at McNeese State	W 72–62	13–5	Burton Coliseum; Lake Charles, Louisiana
Jan 28, 1987*		at Southwestern Louisiana	L 72–73	13–6	Cajundome; Lafayette, Louisiana
Jan 31, 1987		South Carolina	W 71–57	14–6 (3–3)	Reed Green Coliseum; Hattiesburg, Mississippi
Feb 2, 1987		at Memphis State	W 84–77	15–6 (4–3)	Mid-South Coliseum; Memphis, Tennessee
Feb 14, 1987		Memphis State	L 72–76	15–7 (4–4)	Reed Green Coliseum; Hattiesburg, Mississippi
Feb 16, 1987		at Louisville	L 84–85 ^{OT}	15–8 (4–5)	Freedom Hall; Louisville, Kentucky
Feb 19, 1987		Cincinnati	W 76–64	16–8 (5–5)	Reed Green Coliseum; Hattiesburg, Mississippi
Feb 21, 1987		Virginia Tech	W 89–77	17–8 (6–5)	Reed Green Coliseum; Hattiesburg, Mississippi
Feb 23, 1987*		Arkansas State	L 73–75	17–9	Reed Green Coliseum; Hattiesburg, Mississippi
Feb 28, 1987		at Florida State	L 102–117	17–10 (6–6)	Tallahassee-Leon County Civic Center; Tallahassee, Florida
Metro Conference tournament
Mar 6, 1987*	(4)	vs. (5) Virginia Tech; First round	W 83–66	18–10	Freedom Hall; Louisville, Kentucky
Mar 7, 1987*	(4)	at (1) Louisville; Semifinals	L 71–78	18–11	Freedom Hall; Louisville, Kentucky
NIT
Mar 13, 1987*		Ole Miss; First round	W 93–75	19–11	Reed Green Coliseum; Hattiesburg, Mississippi
Mar 17, 1987*		at Saint Louis; Second round	W 83–78 ^{OT}	20–11	Kiel Auditorium; St. Louis, Missouri
Mar 21, 1987*		at Vanderbilt; Quarterfinals	W 95–88	21–11	Memorial Gymnasium; Nashville, Tennessee
Mar 24, 1987*		vs. Nebraska; Semifinals	W 82–75	22–11	Madison Square Garden; New York, New York
Mar 26, 1987*		vs. La Salle; Finals	W 84–80	23–11	Madison Square Garden; New York, New York
*Non-conference game. ^{#}Rankings from AP poll. (#) Tournament seedings in parentheses. All times are in Central Time.
