= 1993–94 Southern Miss Golden Eagles basketball team =

American college basketball season

1993–94 Southern Miss Golden Eagles men's basketball

NIT, First Round
- Conference: Metro Conference (1975–1995)
- Record: 15–15 (5–7 Metro)
- Head coach: M. K. Turk (18th season)
- Home arena: Reed Green Coliseum

1993–94 Metro Conference men's basketball standings
| | Conf. | | | | Overall |
| Team | W | | L | PCT | W | | L | PCT |
|---|---|---|---|---|---|---|---|---|
| No. 10 Louisville † | 10 | – | 2 | .833 | 28 | – | 6 | .824 |
| Tulane | 7 | – | 5 | .583 | 18 | – | 11 | .621 |
| Charlotte | 7 | – | 5 | .583 | 16 | – | 13 | .552 |
| Virginia Tech | 6 | – | 6 | .500 | 18 | – | 10 | .643 |
| VCU | 5 | – | 7 | .417 | 14 | – | 13 | .519 |
| Southern Miss | 5 | – | 7 | .417 | 15 | – | 15 | .500 |
| South Florida | 2 | – | 10 | .167 | 10 | – | 17 | .370 |
† 1994 Metro Conference tournament winner Rankings from AP Poll

The 1993–94 Southern Miss Golden Eagles basketball team represented University of Southern Mississippi in the 1993–94 college basketball season.

== Roster ==
1993–94 Southern Miss Golden Eagles men's basketball team
Players
Coaches

| Pos. | # | Name | Height | Weight | Year | Hometown |
|---|---|---|---|---|---|---|
| G | | Bernard Haslett | 6 ft 3 in (1.91 m) | — | Sr |
| C | | Glen Whisby | 6 ft 9 in (2.06 m) | — | Jr | Brookhaven, Mississippi |
| F | | Herman Myers | 6 ft 7 in (2.01 m) | — | Sr |
| F | | Maurice Morris | 6 ft 4 in (1.93 m) | — | Jr |
| G | | Damien Smith | 5 ft 10 in (1.78 m) | — | Fr |
| F | | Fred Williams | 6 ft 7 in (2.01 m) | — | Jr |
| G | | Avery Thomas | 6 ft 1 in (1.85 m) | — | Jr |
| G | | Sam Jones | 6 ft 4 in (1.93 m) | — | So |
| F | | John Lacey | 6 ft 7 in (2.01 m) | — | Sr |
| F | | Mike Jones | 6 ft 5 in (1.96 m) | — | Fr |
| F | | George Scott | 6 ft 4 in (1.93 m) | — | Fr |
| F | | A.J. Ashe | 6 ft 7 in (2.01 m) | — | Fr |
| G | | Jason Dunn | 6 ft 5 in (1.96 m) | — | Sr |
| G | | Carey Martin | 6 ft 0 in (1.83 m) | — | Sr |

Head coach

- M. K. Turk

Assistant coach(es)

Legend

- (C) Team captain
- (S) Suspended
- (I) Ineligible
- (W) Walk-on
- Injured
- Current redshirt

Roster

== Schedule and results ==
| Date time, TV | Rank^{#} | Opponent^{#} | Result | Record | Site city, state |
Non-conference regular season
| Nov 27, 1993* | | at Kansas State | W 74–60 | 1–0 | Bramlage Coliseum; Manhattan, Kansas |
| Dec 4, 1993* | | at Mississippi State | L 58–62 | 1–1 | Humphrey Coliseum; Starkville, Mississippi |
| Dec 6, 1993* | | Alcorn State | W 110–81 | 2–1 | Reed Green Coliseum; Hattiesburg, Mississippi |
| Dec 18, 1993* | | vs. Ole Miss; Cellular South Mississippi Beach Shootout | L 74–78 | 2–2 | Mississippi Coast Coliseum; Biloxi, Mississippi |
| Dec 21, 1993* | | Alabama | W 79–62 | 3–2 | Reed Green Coliseum; Hattiesburg, Mississippi |
| Dec 23, 1993* | | Northeast Louisiana | W 83–65 | 4–2 | Reed Green Coliseum; Hattiesburg, Mississippi |
| Dec 30, 1993* | | Kansas State | L 78–84 | 4–3 | Reed Green Coliseum; Hattiesburg, Mississippi |
| Jan 2, 1994* | | at Chattanooga | L 95–98 | 4–4 | UTC Arena; Chattanooga, Tennessee |
| Jan 5, 1994* | | Southwestern Louisiana | W 90–83 | 5–4 | Reed Green Coliseum; Hattiesburg, Mississippi |
| Jan 11, 1994* | | at South Alabama | L 82–83 | 5–5 | Jaguar Gym; Mobile, Alabama |
Metro Conference regular season
| Jan 15, 1994 | | VCU | W 69–64 | 6–5 (1–0) | Reed Green Coliseum; Hattiesburg, Mississippi |
| Jan 17, 1994* | | at Northeast Louisiana | W 75–72 | 7–5 | Fant–Ewing Coliseum; Monroe, Louisiana |
| Jan 20, 1994 | | Charlotte | L 63–64 | 7–6 (1–1) | Reed Green Coliseum; Hattiesburg, Mississippi |
| Jan 22, 1994 | | at No. 13 Louisville | L 69–70 | 7–7 (1–2) | Freedom Hall; Louisville, Kentucky |
| Jan 27, 1994 | | at VCU | L 76–79 | 7–8 (1–3) | Richmond Coliseum; Richmond, Virginia |
| Jan 29, 1994 | | at Virginia Tech | W 83–74 | 8–8 (2–3) | Cassell Coliseum; Blacksburg, Virginia |
| Feb 1, 1994* | | Mississippi Valley State | W 97–73 | 9–8 | Reed Green Coliseum; Hattiesburg, Mississippi |
| Feb 5, 1994 | | Virginia Tech | W 59–55 | 10–8 (3–3) | Reed Green Coliseum; Hattiesburg, Mississippi |
| Feb 10, 1994 | | at Charlotte | L 73–78 | 10–9 (3–4) | Charlotte Coliseum; Charlotte, North Carolina |
| Feb 12, 1994 | | at South Florida | W 73–68 | 11–9 (4–4) | USF Sun Dome; Tampa, Florida |
| Feb 16, 1994* | | Memphis State | W 76–67 | 12–9 | Reed Green Coliseum; Hattiesburg, Mississippi |
| Feb 19, 1994 | | at Tulane | L 79–84 | 12–10 (4–5) | Avron B. Fogelman Arena; New Orleans, Louisiana |
| Feb 22, 1994 | | at Auburn | L 73–89 | 12–11 | Joel H. Eaves Memorial Coliseum; Auburn, Alabama |
| Feb 26, 1994 | | South Florida | W 68–67 | 13–11 (5–5) | Reed Green Coliseum; Hattiesburg, Mississippi |
| Mar 2, 1994 | | No. 10 Louisville | L 75–82 | 13–12 (5–6) | Reed Green Coliseum; Hattiesburg, Mississippi |
| Mar 5, 1994 | | Tulane | L 82–83 | 13–13 (5–7) | Reed Green Coliseum; Hattiesburg, Mississippi |
Metro Conference tournament
| Mar 11, 1994* | (6) | vs. (3) Tulane; First round | W 79–60 | 14–13 | Mississippi Coast Coliseum; Biloxi, Mississippi |
| Mar 12, 1994* | (6) | vs. (2) Charlotte; Semifinals | W 68–64 | 15–13 | Mississippi Coast Coliseum; Biloxi, Mississippi |
| Mar 13, 1994* | (6) | vs. (1) Louisville; Championship | L 61–69 | 15–14 | Mississippi Coast Coliseum; Biloxi, Mississippi |
NIT
| Mar 17, 1994* | | at Clemson; First round | L 85–96 | 15–15 | Littlejohn Coliseum; Clemson, South Carolina |
*Non-conference game. ^{#}Rankings from AP poll. (#) Tournament seedings in parentheses. All times are in Central Time.
