= 1989–90 Louisville Cardinals men's basketball team =

American college basketball season

1989–90 Louisville Cardinals men's basketball

Metro Conference tournament champions Metro Conference regular season Champions

NCAA men's Division I tournament, Round of 32
- Conference: Metro Conference (1975–1995)

Ranking
- Coaches: No. 16
- AP: No. 16
- Record: 27–8 (12–2 Metro)
- Head coach: Denny Crum (19th season)
- Home arena: Freedom Hall

1989–90 Metro Conference men's basketball standings
	Conf.				Overall
Team	W		L	PCT	W		L	PCT
No. 16 Louisville †	12	–	2	.857	27	–	8	.771
Southern Miss	9	–	5	.643	20	–	12	.625
Cincinnati	9	–	5	.643	20	–	14	.588
Memphis State	8	–	6	.571	18	–	12	.600
Florida State	6	–	8	.429	16	–	15	.516
South Carolina	6	–	8	.429	14	–	14	.500
Virginia Tech	5	–	9	.357	13	–	18	.419
Tulane	1	–	13	.071	4	–	24	.143
† 1990 Metro Conference tournament winner Rankings from AP Poll

The 1989–90 Louisville Cardinals men's basketball team represented the University of Louisville in the 1989–90 NCAA Division I men's basketball season. The head coach was Denny Crum and the team finished the season with an overall record of 27–8.

== Roster ==
1989–90 Louisville Cardinals men's basketball team
Players
Coaches

Pos.	#	Name	Height	Weight	Year	Hometown
SG	23	LaBradford Smith	6 ft 3 in (1.91 m)	195 lb (88 kg)	Jr	Bay City	Bay City, Texas
C	50	Felton Spencer	7 ft 0 in (2.13 m)	255 lb (116 kg)	Sr	Eastern	Louisville, Kentucky

Head coach

- Denny Crum (UCLA)

Assistant coach(es)

Legend

- (C) Team captain
- (S) Suspended
- (I) Ineligible
- (W) Walk-on
- Injured
- Current redshirt

== NBA draft ==
Round	Pick	Player	NBA club
1	6	Felton Spencer	Minnesota Timberwolves
