= Basket Club Ferrara =

- Founded: 1999
- Dissolved: 2011
- History: Basket Club Ferrara; 1999–2011
- Arena: PalaSegest
- Capacity: 3,504
- Location: Ferrara, Emilia-Romagna, Italy
- Team colors: White, Silver and Black
Home	Away

Basket Club Ferrara was an Italian professional basketball team based in Ferrara, Emilia-Romagna.

For past club sponsorship names, see sponsorship names.

== History ==
Basket Club Ferrara was founded on 16 June 1999 and started playing in the third division Serie B d’Eccellenza that same season. It stayed another season in the league before moving up to the LegaDue in 2001.

Ferrara would win the LegaDue in 2007–08, obtaining a promotion to the first division Serie A where it stayed until 2010. After the 2010–11 season, club president Roberto Mascellani sold the LegaDue sporting rights of Ferrara to Biancoblù Basket Bologna (in Italian), effectively ending Ferrara's activity. Pallacanestro Ferrara was formed soon after by a group of entrepreneurs who bought the fourth division Serie B sporting rights of Pallacanestro Budrio. As of the 2015–16 season, this club plays in the second division Serie A2. In 2016 the Under 20 youth team of Pallacanestro Ferrara won the Under 20 National Championship, taking the first National title to newly formed club.

== Notable players ==
- (United States) Monty Mack 1 season: '01-'02
- (United States) Frantz Pierre-Louis 1 season: '01-'02
- (United States) Terence Black 1 season: '01-'02
- (United States) Venson Hamilton 1 season: '01-'02
- (United States) (Italy) Michael Williams 3 seasons: '02-'05
- (Italy) Cristiano Grappasonni 2 seasons: '02-'04
- (United States) Brian Tolbert 1 season: '02-'03
- (United States) Albert Burditt 1 season: '02-'03
- (United States) Geno Carlisle 1 season: '02-'03
- (Italy) Andrea Ghiacci 3 seasons: '03-'06
- (United States) Terrell McIntyre 1 season: '03-'04
- (United States) MC Mazique 1 season: '03-'04
- (United States) Jobey Thomas 2 seasons: '04-'06
- (United States) Glen Whisby 1 season: '04-'05
- (United States) Titus Ivory 1 season: '04-'05
- (Italy) Leonardo Busca 1 season: '04-'05
- (United States) Brent Darby 1 season: '05-'06
- (United States) Paul Marigney 1 season: '06-'07

== Sponsorship names ==
Throughout the years, due to sponsorship, the club had been known as:

- Sinteco Ferrara (1999-02)
- Carife Ferrara (2002–2010)
- NaturHouse Ferrara (2010–2011)
