= 1987 National Invitation Tournament =

Annual NCAA college basketball competition

- Season: 1986–87
- Teams: 32
- Finals site: Madison Square Garden, New York City
- Champions: Southern Miss Golden Eagles (1st title)
- Runner-up: La Salle Explorers (2nd title game)
- Semifinalists: Nebraska Cornhuskers (2nd semifinal); Arkansas-Little Rock Trojans (1st semifinal)
- Winning coach: M. K. Turk (1st title)
- MVP: Randolph Keys (Southern Miss)

The 1987 National Invitation Tournament was the 1987 edition of the annual NCAA college basketball competition. The tournament began on Wednesday, March 11, and ended when the Southern Miss Golden Eagles defeated the La Salle Explorers in the NIT championship game on Thursday, March 26, at Madison Square Garden.

== Selected teams ==
Below is a list of the 32 teams selected for the tournament.

- Akron
- Arkansas
- Arkansas–Little Rock
- Arkansas State
- Baylor
- Boise State
- California
- Cal State Fullerton
- Chattanooga
- Cleveland State
- Florida State
- Illinois State
- Jacksonville
- James Madison
- La Salle
- Marquette
- Mississippi
- Montana State
- Nebraska
- New Mexico
- Niagara
- Oregon State
- Rhode Island
- Saint Louis
- Saint Peter's
- Seton Hall
- Southern Miss
- Stephen F. Austin
- Utah
- Vanderbilt
- Villanova
- Washington

=== Louisville declines invitation ===
Louisville turned down an invitation to the 1987 NIT, the first team in history to decline an NIT bid. No team would do so again until Georgetown in 2002.

== Bracket ==
Below are the four first round brackets, along with the four-team championship bracket.

First Round
Niagara	74
Seton Hall	65
La Salle	86
Villanova	84
Cleveland State	92
Chattanooga	73
Illinois State	79
Akron	72

Second Round
Niagara	81
La Salle	89
Cleveland State	77
Illinois State	79

Quarterfinals
La Salle	70
Illinois State	50

First Round
Arkansas–Little Rock	42
Baylor	41
Stephen F. Austin	70
James Madison	63
Oregon State	85
New Mexico	82
California	72
Cal State Fullerton	68

Second Round
Arkansas–Little Rock	54
Stephen F. Austin	48
Oregon State	62
California	65

Quarterfinals
Arkansas–Little Rock	80
California	73

First Round
Vanderbilt	74
Jacksonville	72
Florida State	107
Rhode Island	92
Saint Louis	76
Saint Peter's	60
Southern Miss	93
Mississippi	75

Second Round
Vanderbilt	109
Florida State	92
Saint Louis	78
Southern Miss	83

Quarterfinals
Vanderbilt	88
Southern Miss	95

First Round
Nebraska	78
Marquette	76
Arkansas	67
Arkansas State	64
Washington	98
Montana State	90
Boise State	62
Utah	61

Second Round
Nebraska	78
Arkansas	71
Washington	73
Boise State	68

Quarterfinals
Nebraska	81
Washington	76

=== Semifinals & finals ===
Semifinals (March 24)
La Salle	92
Arkansas–Little Rock	73
Southern Miss	82
Nebraska	75

Finals (March 26)
La Salle	80
Southern Miss	84

Third place game
Arkansas–Little Rock	67
Nebraska	76

== See also ==
- 1987 National Women's Invitational Tournament
- 1987 NCAA Division I men's basketball tournament
- 1987 NCAA Division II men's basketball tournament
- 1987 NCAA Division III men's basketball tournament
- 1987 NCAA Division I women's basketball tournament
- 1987 NCAA Division II women's basketball tournament
- 1987 NCAA Division III women's basketball tournament
- 1987 NAIA Division I men's basketball tournament
- 1987 NAIA Division I women's basketball tournament
