= 1994 Metro Conference men's basketball tournament =

- Classification: Division I
- Season: 1993–94
- Teams: 7
- Site: Mississippi Coast Coliseum; Biloxi, MS
- Champions: Louisville (10th title)
- Winning coach: Denny Crum (10th title)
- MVP: Clifford Rozier (Louisville)

1993–94 Metro Conference men's basketball standings
	Conf.				Overall
Team	W		L	PCT	W		L	PCT
No. 10 Louisville †	10	–	2	.833	28	–	6	.824
Tulane	7	–	5	.583	18	–	11	.621
Charlotte	7	–	5	.583	16	–	13	.552
Virginia Tech	6	–	6	.500	18	–	10	.643
VCU	5	–	7	.417	14	–	13	.519
Southern Miss	5	–	7	.417	15	–	15	.500
South Florida	2	–	10	.167	10	–	17	.370
† 1994 Metro Conference tournament winner Rankings from AP Poll

The 1994 Metro Conference men's basketball tournament was held March 11–13 at the Mississippi Coast Coliseum in Biloxi, Mississippi.

Louisville defeated Southern Miss in the championship game, 69–61, to win their 10th Metro men's basketball tournament. The Cardinals received an automatic bid to the 1994 NCAA Tournament as the conference's lone representative.

== Format ==
All seven of the conference's members participated. They were seeded based on regular season conference records, with the top team earning a bye into the semifinal round. The other six teams entered into the preliminary first round.

== Bracket ==
First round Friday, March 11
4	Virginia Tech	65
5	VCU	64
6	Southern Miss	79
3	Tulane	60
7	South Florida	54
2	Charlotte	64

Semifinals; Saturday, March 12
1	Louisville	76
4	Virginia Tech	67
6	Southern Miss	68
2	UNC Charlotte	64

Championship; Sunday, March 13
1	Louisville	69
6	Southern Miss	61
