= 1980–81 Southern Miss Golden Eagles basketball team =

American college basketball season

1980–81 Southern Miss Golden Eagles men's basketball

NIT, First Round
- Conference: Independent
- Record: 20–7
- Head coach: M. K. Turk (5th season)
- Home arena: Reed Green Coliseum

1980–81 NCAA Division I men's basketball independents standings
| | Conf. | | | | Overall |
| Team | W | | L | PCT | W | | L | PCT |
|---|---|---|---|---|---|---|---|---|
| No. 1 DePaul | | – | | – | 27 | – | 2 | .931 |
| No. 7 Notre Dame | | – | | – | 23 | – | 6 | .793 |
| Southern Miss | | – | | – | 20 | – | 7 | .741 |
| James Madison | | – | | – | 21 | – | 9 | .700 |
| Fordham | | – | | – | 19 | – | 9 | .679 |
| Cleveland State | | – | | – | 18 | – | 9 | .667 |
| Stetson | | – | | – | 18 | – | 9 | .667 |
| Saint Peter's | | – | | – | 17 | – | 9 | .654 |
| Tennessee State | | – | | – | 17 | – | 9 | .654 |
| Marquette | | – | | – | 20 | – | 11 | .645 |
| Old Dominion | | – | | – | 18 | – | 10 | .643 |
| Penn State | | – | | – | 17 | – | 10 | .630 |
| St. Francis (Pa.) | | – | | – | 17 | – | 10 | .630 |
| Siena | | – | | – | 17 | – | 10 | .630 |
| South Carolina | | – | | – | 17 | – | 10 | .630 |
| Dayton | | – | | – | 18 | – | 11 | .621 |
| Long Island | | – | | – | 18 | – | 11 | .621 |
| Texas–Pan American | | – | | – | 18 | – | 11 | .621 |
| Illinois State | | – | | – | 16 | – | 11 | .593 |
| Wagner | | – | | – | 16 | – | 11 | .593 |
| UNLV | | – | | – | 16 | – | 12 | .571 |
| William & Mary | | – | | – | 16 | – | 12 | .571 |
| North Texas State | | – | | – | 15 | – | 12 | .556 |
| Southeastern Louisiana | | – | | – | 14 | – | 13 | .519 |
| Iona | | – | | – | 15 | – | 14 | .517 |
| Richmond | | – | | – | 15 | – | 14 | .517 |
| Fairfield | | – | | – | 13 | – | 13 | .500 |
| UNC Wilmington | | – | | – | 13 | – | 13 | .500 |
| New Orleans | | – | | – | 13 | – | 14 | .481 |
| Towson State | | – | | – | 13 | – | 14 | .481 |
| East Carolina | | – | | – | 12 | – | 14 | .462 |
| Fairleigh Dickinson | | – | | – | 12 | – | 14 | .462 |
| Valparaiso | | – | | – | 12 | – | 15 | .444 |
| Campbell | | – | | – | 11 | – | 16 | .407 |
| George Mason | | – | | – | 10 | – | 16 | .385 |
| St. Francis (N.Y.) | | – | | – | 10 | – | 16 | .385 |
| Navy | | – | | – | 9 | – | 16 | .360 |
| Robert Morris | | – | | – | 9 | – | 18 | .333 |
| Baptist | | – | | – | 8 | – | 19 | .296 |
| Northern Iowa | | – | | – | 8 | – | 19 | .296 |
| Army | | – | | – | 7 | – | 19 | .269 |
| Portland State | | – | | – | 7 | – | 20 | .259 |
| Manhattan | | – | | – | 6 | – | 20 | .231 |
| Nicholls State | | – | | – | 6 | – | 22 | .214 |
| Baltimore | | – | | – | 5 | – | 21 | .192 |
| Catholic | | – | | – | 4 | – | 20 | .167 |
Rankings from AP Poll

The 1980–81 Southern Miss Golden Eagles basketball team represented University of Southern Mississippi in the 1980–81 college basketball season.

== Roster ==
1980–81 Southern Miss Golden Eagles men's basketball team
Players
Coaches

| Pos. | # | Name | Height | Weight | Year | Hometown |
|---|---|---|---|---|---|---|
| G | 11 | Larry Boyd | 6 ft 3 in (1.91 m) | 180 lb (82 kg) | So | Columbus, Georgia |
| C | 44 | Paul Crowley | 6 ft 9 in (2.06 m) | 195 lb (88 kg) | Fr | Bardwell, Kentucky |
| F | 50 | Joe Dawson | 6 ft 5 in (1.96 m) | 221 lb (100 kg) | Jr | Tuscaloosa, Alabama |
| G | 24 | Edgar Eason | 6 ft 4 in (1.93 m) | 190 lb (86 kg) | Fr | Tuscaloosa, Alabama |
| F | 45 | Mike Funderburk | 6 ft 6 in (1.98 m) | 200 lb (91 kg) | Fr | Hattiesburg, Mississippi |
| G | 10 | Curtis Green | 6 ft 1 in (1.85 m) | 170 lb (77 kg) | Fr | Memphis, Tennessee |
| F | 41 | Eddie Jiles | 6 ft 4 in (1.93 m) | 185 lb (84 kg) | Sr | Ozark, Alabama |
| C | 33 | Ronald Jackson | 6 ft 8 in (2.03 m) | 195 lb (88 kg) | Sr | Selma, Alabama |
| G | 25 | George Johnson | 6 ft 3 in (1.91 m) | 175 lb (79 kg) | Sr | Joliet, Illinois |
| G | 22 | Deora Marsh | 6 ft 6 in (1.98 m) | 185 lb (84 kg) | Jr | Ashtabula, Ohio |
| G | 5 | Donald Stinchcomb | 6 ft 3 in (1.91 m) | 180 lb (82 kg) | Sr | College Park, Georgia |

Head coach

- M. K. Turk

Assistant coach(es)

- Micky Harrington
- Mike Jones
- Greg Lackey
- Robert McInnis

Legend

- (C) Team captain
- (S) Suspended
- (I) Ineligible
- (W) Walk-on
- Injured
- Current redshirt

== Schedule ==
| Date time, TV | Rank^{#} | Opponent^{#} | Result | Record | Site city, state |
|---|---|---|---|---|---|
| December 1 | | Louisiana-Lafayette | W 72–67 | 1–0 | Reed Green Coliseum; Hattiesburg, Mississippi |
| December 3 | | Eastern Kentucky | W 82–74 | 2–0 | Reed Green Coliseum; Hattiesburg, Mississippi |
| December 6 | | at Memphis State | L 65–70 | 2–1 | Mid-South Coliseum; Memphis, Tennessee |
| December 9 | | Oklahoma | W 74–66 | 3–1 | Reed Green Coliseum; Hattiesburg, Mississippi |
| December 15 | | vs. Mississippi State | W 68–53 | 4–1 | Jackson, Mississippi |
| December 22 | | vs. Arkansas | L 68–76 | 4–2 | Pine Bluff, Arkansas |
| December 27 | | Indiana State-Evansville | W 75–72 | 5–2 | Reed Green Coliseum; Hattiesburg, Mississippi |
| December 29 | | vs. Wagner | W 73–67 | 6–2 | BJCC Coliseum; Birmingham, Alabama |
| December 30 | | at UAB | L 55–60 ^{OT} | 6–3 | BJCC Coliseum; Birmingham, Alabama |
| January 3 | | Indiana-SE | W 68–64 | 7–3 | Reed Green Coliseum; Hattiesburg, Mississippi |
| January 7 | | at Marquette | W 84–72 | 8–3 | MECCA Arena; Milwaukee, Wisconsin |
| January 10 | | Biscayne | W 81–69 | 9–3 | Reed Green Coliseum; Hattiesburg, Mississippi |
| January 12 | | Louisiana Tech | W 62–57 | 10–3 | Reed Green Coliseum; Hattiesburg, Mississippi |
| January 15 | | at Louisiana-Lafayette | W 79–74 | 11–3 | Blackham Coliseum; Lafayette, Louisiana |
| January 22 | | at Northwestern State | L 65–67 | 11–4 | Prather Coliseum; Natchitoches, Louisiana |
| January 24 | | at North Texas | W 72–66 ^{OT} | 12–4 | UNT Coliseum; Denton, Texas |
| January 29 | | Texas-Pan American | W 81–68 | 13–4 | Reed Green Coliseum; Hattiesburg, Mississippi |
| February 2 | | at Eastern Kentucky | W 78–71 | 14–4 | Alumni Coliseum; Richmond, Kentucky |
| February 4 | | at Texas-Pan American | W 68–67 | 15–4 | UTRGV Fieldhouse; Edinburg, Texas |
| February 7 | | Tulane | W 71–61 | 16–4 | Reed Green Coliseum; Hattiesburg, Mississippi |
| February 9 | | New Orleans | L 79–82 ^{OT} | 16–5 | Reed Green Coliseum; Hattiesburg, Mississippi |
| February 11 | | Memphis State | W 90–66 | 17–5 | Reed Green Coliseum; Hattiesburg, Mississippi |
| February 14 | | North Texas | W 87–71 | 18–5 | Reed Green Coliseum; Hattiesburg, Mississippi |
| February 17 | | Northwestern State | W 81–71 | 19–5 | Reed Green Coliseum; Hattiesburg, Mississippi |
| February 20 | | at New Orleans | W 83–70 | 20–5 | Human Performance Center; New Orleans, Louisiana |
| March 2 | | at Tulane | L 80–84 | 20–6 | Devlin Fieldhouse; New Orleans, Louisiana |
NIT tournament
| March 12 | | Holy Cross; First round | L 54–56 | 20–7 | Reed Green Coliseum; Hattiesburg, Mississippi |
*Non-conference game. ^{#}Rankings from AP poll. (#) Tournament seedings in parentheses. All times are in Central Time.
