= 1980–81 DePaul Blue Demons men's basketball team =

American college basketball season

1980–81 DePaul Blue Demons men's basketball
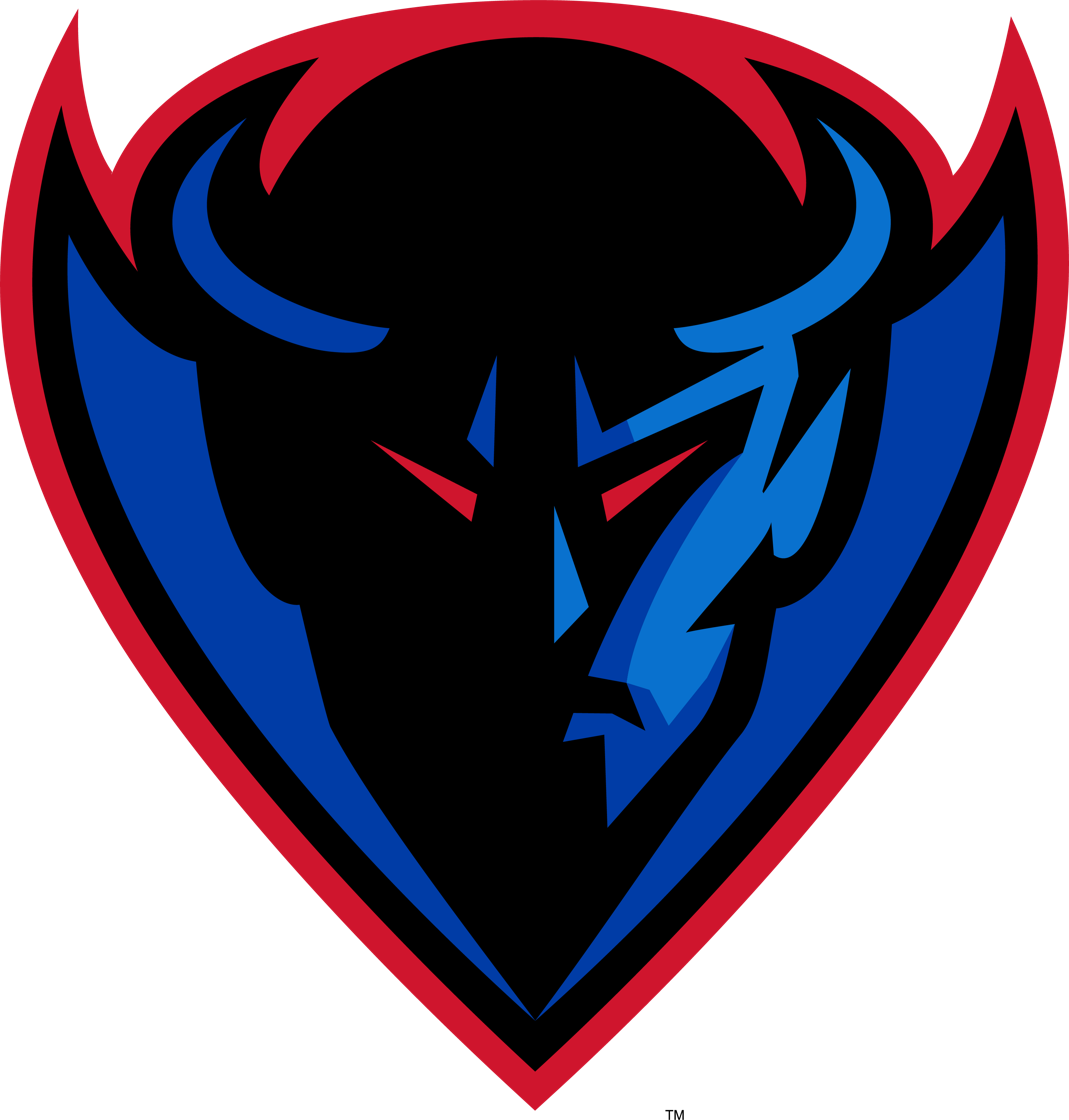

NCAA Division I regular season champions

NCAA Tournament, Second Round
- Conference: Independent

Ranking
- Coaches: No. 1
- AP: No. 1
- Record: 27–2
- Head coach: Ray Meyer (39th season)
- Assistant coaches: Joey Meyer (7th season); Jim Molinari (2nd season)
- Captain: Mark Aguirre
- Home arena: Rosemont Horizon

1980–81 NCAA Division I men's basketball independents standings
	Conf.				Overall
Team	W		L	PCT	W		L	PCT
No. 1 DePaul		–		–	27	–	2	.931
No. 7 Notre Dame		–		–	23	–	6	.793
Southern Miss		–		–	20	–	7	.741
James Madison		–		–	21	–	9	.700
Fordham		–		–	19	–	9	.679
Cleveland State		–		–	18	–	9	.667
Stetson		–		–	18	–	9	.667
Saint Peter's		–		–	17	–	9	.654
Tennessee State		–		–	17	–	9	.654
Marquette		–		–	20	–	11	.645
Old Dominion		–		–	18	–	10	.643
Penn State		–		–	17	–	10	.630
St. Francis (Pa.)		–		–	17	–	10	.630
Siena		–		–	17	–	10	.630
South Carolina		–		–	17	–	10	.630
Dayton		–		–	18	–	11	.621
Long Island		–		–	18	–	11	.621
Texas–Pan American		–		–	18	–	11	.621
Illinois State		–		–	16	–	11	.593
Wagner		–		–	16	–	11	.593
UNLV		–		–	16	–	12	.571
William & Mary		–		–	16	–	12	.571
North Texas State		–		–	15	–	12	.556
Southeastern Louisiana		–		–	14	–	13	.519
Iona		–		–	15	–	14	.517
Richmond		–		–	15	–	14	.517
Fairfield		–		–	13	–	13	.500
UNC Wilmington		–		–	13	–	13	.500
New Orleans		–		–	13	–	14	.481
Towson State		–		–	13	–	14	.481
East Carolina		–		–	12	–	14	.462
Fairleigh Dickinson		–		–	12	–	14	.462
Valparaiso		–		–	12	–	15	.444
Campbell		–		–	11	–	16	.407
George Mason		–		–	10	–	16	.385
St. Francis (N.Y.)		–		–	10	–	16	.385
Navy		–		–	9	–	16	.360
Robert Morris		–		–	9	–	18	.333
Baptist		–		–	8	–	19	.296
Northern Iowa		–		–	8	–	19	.296
Army		–		–	7	–	19	.269
Portland State		–		–	7	–	20	.259
Manhattan		–		–	6	–	20	.231
Nicholls State		–		–	6	–	22	.214
Baltimore		–		–	5	–	21	.192
Catholic		–		–	4	–	20	.167
Rankings from AP Poll

The 1980–81 DePaul Blue Demons men's basketball team represented DePaul University during the 1980–81 NCAA Division I men's basketball season. They were led by head coach Ray Meyer, in his 39th season, and played their home games at the brand new Rosemont Horizon in Rosemont. For the second year in a row the Blue Demons were a #1 seed in the NCAA Tournament. Once again DePaul lost in the second round, this time to St Joseph's 49–48.

== Roster ==
1980–81 DePaul Blue Demons men's basketball team
Players
Coaches

Pos.	#	Name	Height	Weight	Year	Previous school	Hometown
F	21	Dennis McGuire	6 ft 8 in (2.03 m)	195 lb (88 kg)	Sr	Holy Cross	River Grove, Illinois
G	23	Clyde Bradshaw	6 ft 0 in (1.83 m)	170 lb (77 kg)	Sr	East Orange	East Orange, NJ
F	24	Mark Aguirre	6 ft 7 in (2.01 m)	225 lb (102 kg)	Jr	Westinghouse	Chicago, IL
F	32	Terry Cummings	6 ft 9 in (2.06 m)	220 lb (100 kg)	So	Carver	Chicago, IL
G	44	Skip Dillard	6 ft 3 in (1.91 m)	200 lb (91 kg)	Jr

Head coach

- Ray Meyer

Assistant coach(es)

- Joey Meyer
- Jim Molinari

Legend

- (C) Team captain
- (S) Suspended
- (I) Ineligible
- (W) Walk-on
- Injured
- Current redshirt

Roster

== Schedule and results ==
Date time, TV	Rank^{#}	Opponent^{#}	Result	Record	Site city, state
Regular season
November 22	No. 2	vs. No. 3 Louisville	W 86–80	1–0	Springfield Civic Center (8,937); Springfield, Massachusetts
December 1	No. 2	Gonzaga	W 74–56	2–0	Rosemont Horizon (11,370); Rosemont, Illinois
December 6	No. 1	Santa Clara	W 88–71	3–0	Rosemont Horizon (15,556); Rosemont, Illinois
December 8	No. 1	Northern Illinois	W 93–56	4–0	Rosemont Horizon (14,711); Rosemont, Illinois
December 13	No. 1	at Texas	W 83–65	5–0	Frank Erwin Center (16,006); Austin, Texas
December 16	No. 1	at North Texas	W 92–86	6–0	Super Pit (9,100); Denton, Texas
December 19	No. 1	vs. Loyola (IL)	W 71–67	7–0	McGaw Memorial Hall (4,992); Evanston, Illinois
December 20	No. 1	vs. Northwestern	W 62–54	8–0	McGaw Memorial Hall (6,543); Evanston, Illinois
December 27	No. 1	No. 3 UCLA	W 93–77	9–0	Rosemont Horizon (16,702); Rosemont, Illinois
December 29	No. 1	vs. Georgetown	W 72–67	10–0	San Diego Sports Arena (8,825); San Diego, California
December 30	No. 1	at San Diego State	W 85–69	11–0	San Diego Sports Arena (11,044); San Diego, California
January 3	No. 1	Furman	W 78–65	12–0	Rosemont Horizon (14,557); Rosemont, Illinois
January 6	No. 1	at Maine	W 85–77	13–0	Alfond Arena (4,803); Orono, Maine
January 10	No. 1	Old Dominion	L 62–63	13–1	Rosemont Horizon (14,858); Rosemont, Illinois
January 13	No. 4	St. Louis	W 93–67	14–1	Rosemont Horizon (13,398); Rosemont, Illinois
January 18	No. 4	Wagner	W 90–75	15–1	Rosemont Horizon (16,168); Rosemont, Illinois
January 24	No. 3	at La Salle	W 69–62	16–1	The Palestra (8,558); Philadelphia, Pennsylvania
January 28	No. 3	at Illinois State	W 54–50	17–1	Horton Fieldhouse (8,529); Normal, Illinois
February 1	No. 3	Syracuse	W 91–69	18–1	Rosemont Horizon (16,020); Rosemont, Illinois
February 4	No. 3	Detroit	W 69–58	19–1	Rosemont Horizon (15,103); Rosemont, Illinois
February 7	No. 3	UAB	W 77–66	20–1	Rosemont Horizon (16,232); Rosemont, Illinois
February 9	No. 3	Creighton	W 83–57	21–1	Rosemont Horizon (16,473); Rosemont, Illinois
February 14	No. 3	at Evansville	W 61–53	22–1	Roberts Municipal Stadium (11,818); Evansville, Indiana
February 21	No. 3	Marquette	W 78–71	23–1	Rosemont Horizon (17,013); Rosemont, Illinois
February 23	No. 3	at Butler	W 89–64	24–1	Hinkle Fieldhouse (13,465); Indianapolis, Indiana
February 28	No. 4	Loyola (IL)	W 105–95	25–1	Rosemont Horizon (17,106); Rosemont, Illinois
March 4	No. 2	at Dayton	W 84–64	26–1	University of Dayton Arena (13,455); Dayton, Ohio
March 8	No. 2	No. 6 Notre Dame	W 74–64	27–1	Rosemont Horizon (17,579); Rosemont, Illinois
NCAA Tournament
March 14	(1 ME) No. 1	vs. (9 ME) Saint Joseph's; Second Round	L 48–49	27–2	University of Dayton Arena (13,455); Dayton, Ohio
*Non-conference game. ^{#}Rankings from AP Poll. (#) Tournament seedings in parentheses. ME=Mideast. All times are in Eastern Time.

== Team players drafted into the NBA ==
Round	Pick	Player	NBA Club
1	1	Mark Aguirre	Dallas Mavericks
2	38	Clyde Bradshaw	Atlanta Hawks
