= 1980–81 Illinois State Redbirds men's basketball team =

American college basketball season

1980–81 Illinois State Redbirds men's basketball
- Conference: Independent
- Record: 16–11
- Head coach: Bob Donewald (3rd season)
- Assistant coaches: Jim Platt; Sam Skarich; Terry Smith
- Home arena: Horton Field House

1980–81 NCAA Division I men's basketball independents standings
	Conf.				Overall
Team	W		L	PCT	W		L	PCT
No. 1 DePaul		–		–	27	–	2	.931
No. 7 Notre Dame		–		–	23	–	6	.793
Southern Miss		–		–	20	–	7	.741
James Madison		–		–	21	–	9	.700
Fordham		–		–	19	–	9	.679
Cleveland State		–		–	18	–	9	.667
Stetson		–		–	18	–	9	.667
Saint Peter's		–		–	17	–	9	.654
Tennessee State		–		–	17	–	9	.654
Marquette		–		–	20	–	11	.645
Old Dominion		–		–	18	–	10	.643
Penn State		–		–	17	–	10	.630
St. Francis (Pa.)		–		–	17	–	10	.630
Siena		–		–	17	–	10	.630
South Carolina		–		–	17	–	10	.630
Dayton		–		–	18	–	11	.621
Long Island		–		–	18	–	11	.621
Texas–Pan American		–		–	18	–	11	.621
Illinois State		–		–	16	–	11	.593
Wagner		–		–	16	–	11	.593
UNLV		–		–	16	–	12	.571
William & Mary		–		–	16	–	12	.571
North Texas State		–		–	15	–	12	.556
Southeastern Louisiana		–		–	14	–	13	.519
Iona		–		–	15	–	14	.517
Richmond		–		–	15	–	14	.517
Fairfield		–		–	13	–	13	.500
UNC Wilmington		–		–	13	–	13	.500
New Orleans		–		–	13	–	14	.481
Towson State		–		–	13	–	14	.481
East Carolina		–		–	12	–	14	.462
Fairleigh Dickinson		–		–	12	–	14	.462
Valparaiso		–		–	12	–	15	.444
Campbell		–		–	11	–	16	.407
George Mason		–		–	10	–	16	.385
St. Francis (N.Y.)		–		–	10	–	16	.385
Navy		–		–	9	–	16	.360
Robert Morris		–		–	9	–	18	.333
Baptist		–		–	8	–	19	.296
Northern Iowa		–		–	8	–	19	.296
Army		–		–	7	–	19	.269
Portland State		–		–	7	–	20	.259
Manhattan		–		–	6	–	20	.231
Nicholls State		–		–	6	–	22	.214
Baltimore		–		–	5	–	21	.192
Catholic		–		–	4	–	20	.167
Rankings from AP Poll

The 1980–81 Illinois State Redbirds men's basketball team represented Illinois State University during the 1980–81 NCAA Division I men's basketball season. The Redbirds, led by third year head coach Bob Donewald, played their home games at Horton Field House and competed as an independent (not a member of a conference). They finished the season 16–11.

== Roster ==
1980–81 Illinois State Redbirds men's basketball team
Players
Coaches

Pos.	#	Name	Height	Weight	Year	Hometown
C	35	Roy Herold	6 ft 8 in (2.03 m)	215 lb (98 kg)	Sr	Helsinki, Finland
F	43	Anthony Jones	6 ft 6 in (1.98 m)	190 lb (86 kg)	Sr	Chicago, IL
G	15	Dave Nussbaumer	6 ft 0 in (1.83 m)	175 lb (79 kg)	Sr	McLean, VA
G	24	McKay Smith	6 ft 6 in (1.98 m)	175 lb (79 kg)	Sr	Springfield, IL
G	32	Dale White	6 ft 5 in (1.96 m)	190 lb (86 kg)	Jr	Covington, IN
G	33	George Carter	6 ft 3 in (1.91 m)	180 lb (82 kg)	RS So	Middletown, OH
F	34	Mark Herron	6 ft 7 in (2.01 m)	200 lb (91 kg)	So	South Bend, IN
C	53	Rick Lamb	6 ft 7 in (2.01 m)	230 lb (104 kg)	So	Illiopolis, IL
F	40	Raynard Malaine	6 ft 6 in (1.98 m)	220 lb (100 kg)	So	Gary, IN
G	23	Dwayne Tyus	6 ft 2 in (1.88 m)	175 lb (79 kg)	So	Chicago, IL
F	52	Hank Cornley	6 ft 7 in (2.01 m)	220 lb (100 kg)	Fr	Columbus, OH
F	45	Mark Zwart	6 ft 8 in (2.03 m)	205 lb (93 kg)	Fr	Monona, WI

Head coach

- Bob Donewald (Hanover)

Assistant coach(es)

- Jim Platt (Concordia–Chicago)
- Sam Skarich (Notre Dame)
- Terry Smith (Marian (IN))

Legend

- (C) Team captain
- (S) Suspended
- (I) Ineligible
- (W) Walk-on
- Injured
- Current redshirt

== Schedule ==
Date time, TV	Rank^{#}	Opponent^{#}	Result	Record	High points	High rebounds	High assists	Site (attendance) city, state
Exhibition Season
November 14, 1980*		Team Fiat of England	W 77–71		17 – Tyus	–	–	Horton Field House; Normal, IL
Regular Season
November 29, 1980*; 2:30 pm		Carthage	W 96–40	1–0	20 – White	12 – Lamb	–	Horton Field House (3,190); Normal, IL
December 1, 1980*; 7:30 pm		Mississippi Valley State	W 94–72	2–0	30 – White	9 – Lamb	–	Horton Field House (4,384); Normal, IL
December 4, 1980*; 7:30 pm		Bradley	L 70–72	2–1	17 – Lamb	8 – Jones	–	Horton Field House (8,216); Normal, IL
December 8, 1980*		at Pepperdine	W 84–72	3–1	18 – White	15 – Lamb	–	Firestone Fieldhouse (1,483); Malibu, CA
December 12, 1980*; 7:30 pm		No. 20 Syracuse	L 52–64	3–2	15 – Lamb	6 – Cornley	–	Horton Field House (6,086); Normal, IL
December 15, 1980*		at Indiana State	L 85–88 ^{2OT}	3–3	24 – White	14 – Lamb	–	Hulman Center (4,975); Terre Haute, IN
December 19, 1980*		vs. Clemson; Milwaukee Classic [Semifinal]	L 56–67	3–4	22 – Lamb	8 – Lamb	–	MECCA Arena (10,034); Milwaukee, WI
December 20, 1980*		vs. California State–Bakersfield; Milwaukee Classic [Third Place]	L 47–48	3–5	13 – White	7 – Jones	–	MECCA Arena (10,599); Milwaukee, WI
December 22, 1980*; 7:30 pm		Pepperdine	W 74–64	4–5	18 – Tyus	9 – Jones	–	Horton Field House (3,591); Normal, IL
January 3, 1981*		at Northern Illinois	L 50–62	4–6	15 – Cornley	9 – Lamb	–	Chick Evans Field House (4,020); DeKalb, IL
January 7, 1981*; 7:30 pm		Quincy	W 70–59	5–6	18 – Jones	12 – Jones	–	Horton Field House (3,092); Normal, IL
January 13, 1981*		at Loyola–Chicago	W 81–73	6–6	26 – Jones	13 – Jones	–	Rosemont Horizon (1,623); Rosemont, IL
January 17, 1981*; 2:30 pm		Western Illinois	W 58–56	7–6	16 – Tyus	11 – Lamb	–	Horton Field House (4,547); Normal, IL
January 19, 1981*		at Valparaiso	W 72–58	8–6	18 – Jones	8 – Lamb	–	Hilltop Gym (2,700); Valparaiso, IN
January 22, 1981*		at McNeese State	L 59–61 ^{OT}	8–7	15 – Jones	8 – Tyus	–	Sudduth Coliseum (3,000); Lake Charles, LA
January 24, 1981*		at Oral Roberts	L 75–80	8–8	22 – Lamb	9 – Lamb	–	Mabee Center (4,750); Tulsa, OK
January 28, 1981*; 7:30 pm		No. 3 DePaul	L 50–54	8–9	20 – Lamb	9 – Lamb	–	Horton Field House (8,529); Normal, IL
January 31, 1981*; 2:30 pm		Eastern Illinois	W 72–58	9–9	21 – Lamb	5 – Tyus, Cornley	–	Horton Field House (4,402); Normal, IL
February 3, 1981*; 7:30 pm		Cleveland State	W 74–57	10–9	21 – Lamb	10 – Lamb	–	Horton Field House (3,552); Normal, IL
February 9, 1981*		at Northern Iowa	W 65–63	11–9	21 – Tyus	9 – Cornley	–	UNI Dome (2,250); Cedar Falls, IA
February 14, 1981*; 2:30 pm		Pan American	L 67–69	11–10	23 – Lamb	9 – Lamb	–	Horton Field House (4,030); Normal, IL
February 16, 1981*; 7:30 pm		Valparaiso	W 55–38	12–10	15 – Jones	8 – Jones	–	Horton Field House (3,628); Normal, IL
February 19, 1981*; 7:30 pm		South Alabama	L 44–50	12–11	12 – Jones	10 – Jones	–	Horton Field House (4,572); Normal, IL
February 21, 1981*		at Detroit	W 66–62	13–11	23 – Tyus	11 – Jones	–	Calihan Hall (2,022); Detroit, MI
February 23, 1981*		at Cleveland State	W 62–53	14–11	17 – Lamb	9 – Smith	–	Woodling Gymnasium (3,355); Cleveland, OH
February 28, 1981*; 2:30 pm		East Carolina	W 64–41	15–11	14 – White, Tyus	6 – Cornley	–	Horton Field House (4,052); Normal, IL
March 4, 1981*; 7:30 pm		Northern Iowa	W 64–44	16–11	15 – Jones	4 – Malaine, Tyus, Cornley	–	Horton Field House (3,930); Normal, IL
*Non-conference game. ^{#}Rankings from AP Poll. (#) Tournament seedings in parentheses. All times are in Central Standard Time.
