= 1980–81 Notre Dame Fighting Irish men's basketball team =

American college basketball season

1980–81 Notre Dame Fighting Irish men's basketball

NCAA Tournament, Sweet Sixteen
- Conference: Independent

Ranking
- Coaches: No. 9
- AP: No. 7
- Record: 23–6
- Head coach: Digger Phelps (10th season)
- Assistant coaches: Pete Gillen (1st season); Tom McLaughlin (3rd season)
- Captain: Kelly Tripucka
- Home arena: Joyce Center

1980–81 NCAA Division I men's basketball independents standings
	Conf.				Overall
Team	W		L	PCT	W		L	PCT
No. 1 DePaul		–		–	27	–	2	.931
No. 7 Notre Dame		–		–	23	–	6	.793
Southern Miss		–		–	20	–	7	.741
James Madison		–		–	21	–	9	.700
Fordham		–		–	19	–	9	.679
Cleveland State		–		–	18	–	9	.667
Stetson		–		–	18	–	9	.667
Saint Peter's		–		–	17	–	9	.654
Tennessee State		–		–	17	–	9	.654
Marquette		–		–	20	–	11	.645
Old Dominion		–		–	18	–	10	.643
Penn State		–		–	17	–	10	.630
St. Francis (Pa.)		–		–	17	–	10	.630
Siena		–		–	17	–	10	.630
South Carolina		–		–	17	–	10	.630
Dayton		–		–	18	–	11	.621
Long Island		–		–	18	–	11	.621
Texas–Pan American		–		–	18	–	11	.621
Illinois State		–		–	16	–	11	.593
Wagner		–		–	16	–	11	.593
UNLV		–		–	16	–	12	.571
William & Mary		–		–	16	–	12	.571
North Texas State		–		–	15	–	12	.556
Southeastern Louisiana		–		–	14	–	13	.519
Iona		–		–	15	–	14	.517
Richmond		–		–	15	–	14	.517
Fairfield		–		–	13	–	13	.500
UNC Wilmington		–		–	13	–	13	.500
New Orleans		–		–	13	–	14	.481
Towson State		–		–	13	–	14	.481
East Carolina		–		–	12	–	14	.462
Fairleigh Dickinson		–		–	12	–	14	.462
Valparaiso		–		–	12	–	15	.444
Campbell		–		–	11	–	16	.407
George Mason		–		–	10	–	16	.385
St. Francis (N.Y.)		–		–	10	–	16	.385
Navy		–		–	9	–	16	.360
Robert Morris		–		–	9	–	18	.333
Baptist		–		–	8	–	19	.296
Northern Iowa		–		–	8	–	19	.296
Army		–		–	7	–	19	.269
Portland State		–		–	7	–	20	.259
Manhattan		–		–	6	–	20	.231
Nicholls State		–		–	6	–	22	.214
Baltimore		–		–	5	–	21	.192
Catholic		–		–	4	–	20	.167
Rankings from AP Poll

The 1980–81 Notre Dame Fighting Irish men's basketball team represented the University of Notre Dame during the 1980–81 NCAA Division I men's basketball season. The team was coached by Digger Phelps and was ranked in the Associated Press poll for the entirety of the season. As a 2 seed, the Fighting Irish defeated the 10 seed James Madison in the second round, 54–45. Notre Dame would fall to BYU in the 1981 NCAA Division I Basketball Tournament.

== Roster ==
1980–81 Notre Dame Fighting Irish men's basketball team
Players
Coaches

Pos.	#	Name	Height	Weight	Year	Hometown
C	53	Tim Andree	6 ft 10 in (2.08 m)	230 lb (104 kg)	So	Farmington, Michigan
F	22	Kevin Hawkins	6 ft 5 in (1.96 m)	200 lb (91 kg)	Sr	Los Angeles, California
F	30	Tracy Jackson	6 ft 6 in (1.98 m)	210 lb (95 kg)	Sr	Silver Spring, Maryland
G	25	Marc Kelly	5 ft 10 in (1.78 m)	160 lb (73 kg)	Jr	La Crescenta, California
C	45	Joe Kleine	6 ft 11 in (2.11 m)	240 lb (109 kg)	Fr	Slater, Missouri
G	15	Mike Mitchell	6 ft 2 in (1.88 m)	175 lb (79 kg)	Jr	San Bruno, California
G	23	John Paxson	6 ft 2 in (1.88 m)	180 lb (82 kg)	So	Kettering, Ohio
C	55	Gilbert Salinas	6 ft 11 in (2.11 m)	215 lb (98 kg)	Sr	San Antonio, Texas
G	33	Tom Sluby	6 ft 4 in (1.93 m)	200 lb (91 kg)	Fr	Washington, DC
F	44	Kelly Tripucka	6 ft 6 in (1.98 m)	230 lb (104 kg)	Sr	Essex Fells, New Jersey
F	34	Bill Varner	6 ft 6 in (1.98 m)	200 lb (91 kg)	So	New Kensington, Pennsylvania
G	24	Stan Wilcox	6 ft 3 in (1.91 m)	180 lb (82 kg)	Sr	North Babylon, New York
F	32	Orlando Woolridge	6 ft 9 in (2.06 m)	215 lb (98 kg)	Sr	Mansfield, Louisiana

Head coach

- Digger Phelps

Assistant coach(es)

Legend

- (C) Team captain
- (S) Suspended
- (I) Ineligible
- (W) Walk-on
- Injured
- Current redshirt

== Schedule and results ==
Date time, TV	Rank^{#}	Opponent^{#}	Result	Record	Site city, state
Regular Season
November 29*	No. 10	No. 6 UCLA	L 81–94	0–1	Pauley Pavilion (12,321); Los Angeles, CA
December 2	No. 13	Montana State	W 89–68	1–1	Joyce Center; Notre Dame, IN
December 4	No. 13	TCU	W 79–63	2–1	Joyce Center; Notre Dame, IN
December 6	No. 13	Cal Poly (Pomona)	W 76–50	3–1	Joyce Center; Notre Dame, IN
December 9	No. 9	at No. 7 Indiana	W 68–64	4–1	Joyce Center; Notre Dame, IN
December 22	No. 8	Valparaiso	W 69–56	5–1	Joyce Center; Notre Dame, IN
December 27	No. 8	Kentucky	W 67–61	6–1	Freedom Hall; Louisville, Kentucky
January 4	No. 4	at Davidson	W 87–67	7–1	Johnston Gym; Davidson, NC
January 6	No. 5	at Villanova	W 94–65	8–1	Villanova Field House; Villanova, Pennsylvania
January 10	No. 5	at Marquette	L 52–54	8–2	MECCA Arena; Milwaukee, WI
January 13	No. 7	at San Francisco	L 63–66	8–3	War Memorial Gymnasium; San Francisco, California
January 17	No. 7	Hofstra	W 65–55	9–3	Joyce Center; Notre Dame, IN
January 19	No. 13	Fordham	W 67–61	10–3	Joyce Center; Notre Dame, IN
January 21	No. 13	San Francisco	W 80–75	11–3	Joyce Center; Notre Dame, IN
January 24	No. 13	at No. 10 Maryland	W 73–70	12–3	Cole Field House; College Park, Maryland
January 27	No. 8	Cornell	W 80–58	13–3	Joyce Center; Notre Dame, IN
January 31	No. 8	South Carolina	W 94–84	14–3	Joyce Center; Notre Dame, IN
February 2	No. 9	Saint Mary's	W 94–63	15–3	Joyce Center; Notre Dame, IN
February 4	No. 9	La Salle	W 60–59	16–3	Joyce Center; Notre Dame, IN
February 8	No. 9	UCLA	L 50–51	16–4	Joyce Center; Notre Dame, IN
February 10	No. 12	Boston	W 89–63	17–4	Joyce Center; Notre Dame, IN
February 14	No. 12	at N. C. State	W 71–55	18–4	Reynolds Coliseum; Raleigh, NC
February 16	No. 11	Fairfield	W 57–55	19–4	Joyce Center; Notre Dame, IN
February 22	No. 11	No. 1 Virginia	W 57–56	20–4	Rosemont Horizon; Rosemont, IL
February 26	No. 6	Saint Francis	W 87–71	21–4	Joyce Center; Notre Dame, IN
February 28*	No. 6	Dayton	W 70–57	22–4	Joyce Center; Notre Dame, IN
March 8	No. 6	at No. 2 DePaul	L 64–74	22–5	Rosemont Horizon; Rosemont, Illinois
NCAA Tournament
March 14	(2 E) No. 5	(10 E) James Madison; NCAA Tournament • Second Round	W 54–45	23–5	Providence Civic Center; Providence, RI
March 19	(2 E) No. 5	at (6 E) No. 16 BYU; NCAA Tournament • Sweet Sixteen	L 50–51	23–6	Omni Coliseum (15,461); Atlanta, Georgia
*Non-conference game. ^{#}Rankings from AP Poll. (#) Tournament seedings in parentheses. E=East.

== Players selected in NBA drafts ==
Round	Pick	Player	NBA club
1	6	Orlando Woolridge	Chicago Bulls
1	12	Kelly Tripucka	Detroit Pistons
2	25	Tracy Jackson	Boston Celtics
8	167	Gilbert Salinas	Atlanta Hawks
