= 1989–90 Southern Miss Golden Eagles basketball team =

American college basketball season

1989–90 Southern Miss Golden Eagles men's basketball

NCAA tournament
- Conference: Metro Conference (1975–1995)
- Record: 20–12 (9–5 Metro)
- Head coach: M. K. Turk
- Home arena: Reed Green Coliseum

1989–90 Metro Conference men's basketball standings
	Conf.				Overall
Team	W		L	PCT	W		L	PCT
No. 16 Louisville †	12	–	2	.857	27	–	8	.771
Southern Miss	9	–	5	.643	20	–	12	.625
Cincinnati	9	–	5	.643	20	–	14	.588
Memphis State	8	–	6	.571	18	–	12	.600
Florida State	6	–	8	.429	16	–	15	.516
South Carolina	6	–	8	.429	14	–	14	.500
Virginia Tech	5	–	9	.357	13	–	18	.419
Tulane	1	–	13	.071	4	–	24	.143
† 1990 Metro Conference tournament winner Rankings from AP Poll

The 1989–90 Southern Miss Golden Eagles basketball team represented the University of Southern Mississippi during the 1989–90 NCAA Division I men's basketball season. The Golden Eagles, led by head coach M. K. Turk, played their home games at Reed Green Coliseum and were members of the Metro Conference. They finished the season 20–12, 9–5 in Metro play to finish in second place behind Louisville. They lost in the championship game of the Metro tournament to top-seed Louisville. Southern Miss received an at-large bid to the 1990 NCAA basketball tournament where they lost in the opening round to La Salle and National Player of the Year Lionel Simmons.

== Roster ==
1989–90 Southern Miss Golden Eagles men's basketball team
Players
Coaches

Pos.	#	Name	Height	Weight	Year	Previous school	Hometown
G		Russell Johnson	6 ft 2 in (1.88 m)	210 lb (95 kg)	Jr
G	23	Darrin Chancellor	6 ft 5 in (1.96 m)	—	Jr
C	32	Daron Jenkins	6 ft 11 in (2.11 m)	—	Jr
F	35	Clarence Weatherspoon	6 ft 6 in (1.98 m)	230 lb (104 kg)	So	Motley	Crawford, Mississippi
F	42	Joe Courtney (redshirt)	6 ft 9 in (2.06 m)	230 lb (104 kg)	Jr	Mississippi State	Jackson, Mississippi

Head coach

- M.K. Turk

Assistant coach(es)

Legend

- (C) Team captain
- (S) Suspended
- (I) Ineligible
- (W) Walk-on
- Injured
- Current redshirt

== Schedule and results ==
Date time, TV	Rank^{#}	Opponent^{#}	Result	Record	Site (attendance) city, state
Regular season
Nov 15, 1989*		at No. 2 Louisiana State; Preseason NIT	L 80–91	0–1	Maravich Assembly Center; Baton Rouge, Louisiana
Nov 27, 1989*		Tennessee Tech	W 95–78	1–1	Reed Green Coliseum; Hattiesburg, Mississippi
Dec 9, 1989*		at Louisiana-Monroe	W 85–81	2–1	Fant-Ewing Coliseum; Monroe, Louisiana
Dec 18, 1989*		at Marshall	W 76–74	3–1	Cam Henderson Center; Huntington, West Virginia
Dec 21, 1989*		at Chattanooga	L 66–69	3–2	McKenzie Arena; Chattanooga, Tennessee
Dec 27, 1989*		vs. Bucknell	W 78–71	4–2	Pensacola Civic Center; Pensacola, Florida
Dec 28, 1989*		vs. Auburn	W 84–73	5–2	Pensacola Civic Center; Pensacola, Florida
Jan 3, 1990*		Northwestern State	W 96–67	6–2	Reed Green Coliseum; Hattiesburg, Mississippi
Jan 6, 1990		at Florida State	L 82–113	6–3 (0–1)	Donald L. Tucker Center; Tallahassee, Florida
Jan 8, 1990*		at South Alabama	L 83–91	6–4	Jaguar Gym; Mobile, Alabama
Jan 11, 1990		Virginia Tech	W 87–85	7–4 (1–1)	Reed Green Coliseum; Hattiesburg, Mississippi
Jan 13, 1990		at No. 20 Memphis State	L 77–93	7–5 (1–2)	Mid-South Coliseum; Memphis, Tennessee
Jan 15, 1990*		Arkansas State	W 85–65	8–5	Reed Green Coliseum; Hattiesburg, Mississippi
Jan 17, 1990*		Appalachian State	W 96–91	9–5	Reed Green Coliseum; Hattiesburg, Mississippi
Jan 20, 1990*		Louisiana-Lafayette	W 106–104	10–5	Reed Green Coliseum; Hattiesburg, Mississippi
Jan 22, 1990*		at New Orleans	L 75–77	10–6	Lakefront Arena; New Orleans, Louisiana
Jan 27, 1990		at Cincinnati	W 83–76	11–6 (2–2)	Fifth Third Arena; Cincinnati, Ohio
Jan 29, 1990		at No. 4 Louisville	L 88–105	11–7 (2–3)	Freedom Hall; Louisville, Kentucky
Jan 31, 1990		Florida State	W 84–72	12–7 (3–3)	Reed Green Coliseum; Hattiesburg, Mississippi
Feb 5, 1990		South Carolina	W 82–65	13–7 (4–3)	Reed Green Coliseum; Hattiesburg, Mississippi
Feb 7, 1990		at Virginia Tech	W 93–76	14–7 (5–3)	Cassell Coliseum; Blacksburg, Virginia
Feb 10, 1990		Memphis State	W 86–82	15–7 (6–3)	Reed Green Coliseum; Hattiesburg, Mississippi
Feb 14, 1990		Tulane	W 80–71	16–7 (7–3)	Reed Green Coliseum; Hattiesburg, Mississippi
Feb 17, 1990		at South Carolina	L 62–74	16–8 (7–4)	Carolina Coliseum; Columbia, South Carolina
Feb 19, 1990*		at McNeese State	L 60–62	16–9	Burton Coliseum; Lake Charles, Louisiana
Feb 22, 1990		Cincinnati	W 70–63	17–9 (8–4)	Reed Green Coliseum; Hattiesburg, Mississippi
Mar 1, 1990		at Tulane	W 92–88	18–9 (9–4)	Avron B. Fogelman Arena; New Orleans, Louisiana
Mar 3, 1990*		No. 21 Louisville	L 71–73	18–10 (11–5)	Reed Green Coliseum; Hattiesburg, Mississippi
Metro tournament
Mar 8, 1990*	(2)	vs. (7) Virginia Tech; Metro tournament Quarterfinal	W 81–67	19–10	Mississippi Coast Coliseum; Biloxi, Mississippi
Mar 9, 1990*	(2)	vs. (3) Cincinnati; Metro tournament Semifinal	W 75–63	20–10	Mississippi Coast Coliseum; Biloxi, Mississippi
Mar 10, 1990*	(2)	vs. (1) No. 18 Louisville; Metro tournament championship	L 80–83	20–11	Mississippi Coast Coliseum; Biloxi, Mississippi
1990 NCAA tournament
Mar 15, 1990*	(13 E)	vs. (4 E) No. 12 La Salle; First Round	L 63–79	20–12	Hartford Civic Center; Hartford, Connecticut
*Non-conference game. ^{#}Rankings from AP poll. (#) Tournament seedings in parentheses. E=East. All times are in Central Time.

== Awards and honors ==
- Clarence Weatherspoon – Metro Conference Player of the Year
