= 1980–81 Marquette Warriors men's basketball team =

American college basketball season

1980–81 Marquette Warriors men's basketball

NIT, First Round L 81–88 vs. Syracuse
- Conference: Independent
- Record: 20–11
- Head coach: Hank Raymonds (4th season)
- Home arena: MECCA Arena

1980–81 NCAA Division I men's basketball independents standings
	Conf.				Overall
Team	W		L	PCT	W		L	PCT
No. 1 DePaul		–		–	27	–	2	.931
No. 7 Notre Dame		–		–	23	–	6	.793
Southern Miss		–		–	20	–	7	.741
James Madison		–		–	21	–	9	.700
Fordham		–		–	19	–	9	.679
Cleveland State		–		–	18	–	9	.667
Stetson		–		–	18	–	9	.667
Saint Peter's		–		–	17	–	9	.654
Tennessee State		–		–	17	–	9	.654
Marquette		–		–	20	–	11	.645
Old Dominion		–		–	18	–	10	.643
Penn State		–		–	17	–	10	.630
St. Francis (Pa.)		–		–	17	–	10	.630
Siena		–		–	17	–	10	.630
South Carolina		–		–	17	–	10	.630
Dayton		–		–	18	–	11	.621
Long Island		–		–	18	–	11	.621
Texas–Pan American		–		–	18	–	11	.621
Illinois State		–		–	16	–	11	.593
Wagner		–		–	16	–	11	.593
UNLV		–		–	16	–	12	.571
William & Mary		–		–	16	–	12	.571
North Texas State		–		–	15	–	12	.556
Southeastern Louisiana		–		–	14	–	13	.519
Iona		–		–	15	–	14	.517
Richmond		–		–	15	–	14	.517
Fairfield		–		–	13	–	13	.500
UNC Wilmington		–		–	13	–	13	.500
New Orleans		–		–	13	–	14	.481
Towson State		–		–	13	–	14	.481
East Carolina		–		–	12	–	14	.462
Fairleigh Dickinson		–		–	12	–	14	.462
Valparaiso		–		–	12	–	15	.444
Campbell		–		–	11	–	16	.407
George Mason		–		–	10	–	16	.385
St. Francis (N.Y.)		–		–	10	–	16	.385
Navy		–		–	9	–	16	.360
Robert Morris		–		–	9	–	18	.333
Baptist		–		–	8	–	19	.296
Northern Iowa		–		–	8	–	19	.296
Army		–		–	7	–	19	.269
Portland State		–		–	7	–	20	.259
Manhattan		–		–	6	–	20	.231
Nicholls State		–		–	6	–	22	.214
Baltimore		–		–	5	–	21	.192
Catholic		–		–	4	–	20	.167
Rankings from AP Poll

The 1980–81 Marquette Warriors men's basketball team represented Marquette University during the 1980–81 men's college basketball season. The Warriors finished the regular season with a record of 19–11.

== Roster ==
1980–81 Marquette Warriors men's basketball team
Players
Coaches

Pos.	#	Name	Height	Weight	Year	Hometown
G	10	Tony Davis	6 ft 2 in (1.88 m)	170 lb (77 kg)	RS Sr	Argo, Illinois
G	21	Artie Green	6 ft 1 in (1.85 m)	180 lb (82 kg)	Sr	Bronx, New York
G	22	Larry Hatchett	6 ft 2 in (1.88 m)	175 lb (79 kg)	RS Sr	Aurora, Illinois
F	0	Oliver Lee	6 ft 6 in (1.98 m)	195 lb (88 kg)	Sr	DeLand, Florida
F	52	Marc Marotta	6 ft 7 in (2.01 m)	210 lb (95 kg)	Fr	Pittsburgh, Pennsylvania
C	45	Dean Marquardt	6 ft 9 in (2.06 m)	215 lb (98 kg)	Jr	Milwaukee, Wisconsin
C	34	Brian Nyenhuis	6 ft 10 in (2.08 m)	200 lb (91 kg)	RS Jr	Oostburg, Wisconsin
G	31	Doc Rivers	6 ft 4 in (1.93 m)	185 lb (84 kg)	Fr	Maywood, Illinois
F	33	Terrell Schlundt	6 ft 7 in (2.01 m)	205 lb (93 kg)	So	Antigo, Wisconsin
F	30	Greg Shimon	6 ft 5 in (1.96 m)	185 lb (84 kg)	RS Jr	Brookfield, Wisconsin
F	42	Don Smolinski	6 ft 5 in (1.96 m)	185 lb (84 kg)	Fr	Menasha, Wisconsin
G	23	Mike Wilson	6 ft 3 in (1.91 m)	175 lb (79 kg)	Jr	Memphis, Tennessee

Head coach

- Hank Raymonds

Assistant coach(es)

- Rick Majerus

Legend

- (C) Team captain
- (S) Suspended
- (I) Ineligible
- (W) Walk-on
- Injured
- Current redshirt

== Schedule ==
Date time, TV	Rank^{#}	Opponent^{#}	Result	Record	Site city, state
December 1		Charleston	W 106–58	1–0	MECCA Arena (11,052); Milwaukee, WI
December 6		Stanford	W 69–58	2–0	MECCA Arena (11,052); Milwaukee, WI
December 13		Illinois	L 68–69	2–1	MECCA Arena (11,052); Milwaukee, WI
December 17		at Minnesota	W 92–68	3–1	Williams Arena (16,715); Minneapolis, MN
December 19		Cal State Bakersfield; Milwaukee Classic	W 95–60	4–1	MECCA Arena (10,034); Milwaukee, WI
December 20		Clemson; Milwaukee Classic	W 68–67	5–1	MECCA Arena (10,599); Milwaukee, WI
December 23		Western Michigan	W 79–74	6–1	MECCA Arena (10,215); Milwaukee, WI
December 27*		vs. Pan American	L 70–71	6–2	Neal S. Blaisdell Center (6,520); Honolulu, Hawaii
December 28*		vs. Loyola Marymount	W 91–80	7–2	Neal S. Blaisdell Center (1,155); Honolulu, Hawaii
December 29*		vs. Louisiana Tech	W 80–66	8–2	Neal S. Blaisdell Center (1,238); Honolulu, Hawaii
January 7		Southern Mississippi	L 72–84	8–3	MECCA Arena (10,552); Milwaukee, WI
January 10		Notre Dame	W 54–52	9–3	MECCA Arena (11,052); Milwaukee, WI
January 13		Memphis	W 86–67	10–3	MECCA Arena (10,852); Milwaukee, WI
January 15		at Creighton	W 76–66	11–3	Omaha Civic Auditorium (8,908); Omaha, Nebraska
January 17		South Carolina	L 89–91	11–4	MECCA Arena (11,052); Milwaukee, WI
January 24		at Dayton	L 73–85	11–5	UD Arena (13,108); Dayton, OH
January 26		at Xavier	W 78–58	12–5	Riverfront Coliseum (4,109); Cincinnati, OH
January 29		at Cleveland State	W 58–54	13–5	Woodling Gym (7,441); Cleveland, OH
January 31		at Wake Forest	L 60–83	13–6	Winston-Salem Memorial Coliseum (8,400); Winston-Salem, NC
February 5		at St. Bonaventure	W 75–65	14–6	Reilly Center (4,150); St. Bonaventure, NY
February 7		Detroit	W 65–42	15–6	MECCA Arena (11,052); Milwaukee, WI
February 10		Xavier	W 78–62	16–6	MECCA Arena (10,106); Milwaukee, WI
February 14		Louisville	L 60–79	16–7	MECCA Arena (11,052); Milwaukee, WI
February 17		at Charlotte	L 58–61	16–8	Bojangles' Coliseum (3,517); Charlotte, NC
February 21		at DePaul	L 71–78	16–9	Allstate Arena (17,013); Rosemont, Illinois
February 24		Loyola	W 63–62	17–9	MECCA Arena (11,052); Milwaukee, WI
February 26		Valparaiso	W 73–58	18–9	MECCA Arena (11,052); Milwaukee, WI
March 1		at Florida State	L 78–81	18–10	Tully Gymnasium (1,512); Tallahassee, Florida
March 4		Stetson	W 91–58	19–10	MECCA Arena (11,052); Milwaukee, WI
March 10		at Wisconsin	W 64–53	20–10	Wisconsin Field House (12,204); Madison, WI
March 13		at Syracuse; NIT First round	L 81–88	20–11	Carrier Dome (20,123); Syracuse, NY
*Non-conference game. ^{#}Rankings from AP Poll. (#) Tournament seedings in parentheses.

== Team players drafted into the NBA ==
Round	Pick	Player	NBA club
4	84	Oliver Lee	Chicago Bulls
