= 1993–94 Louisville Cardinals men's basketball team =

American college basketball season

1993–94 Louisville Cardinals men's basketball

Rainbow Classic champions Metro Conference tournament champions Metro Conference regular season champions

NCAA tournament, Sweet Sixteen
- Conference: Metro Conference (1975–1995)

Ranking
- Coaches: No. 10
- AP: No. 10
- Record: 28–6 (10–2 Metro)
- Head coach: Denny Crum (23rd season)
- Home arena: Freedom Hall

1993–94 Metro Conference men's basketball standings
	Conf.				Overall
Team	W		L	PCT	W		L	PCT
No. 10 Louisville †	10	–	2	.833	28	–	6	.824
Tulane	7	–	5	.583	18	–	11	.621
Charlotte	7	–	5	.583	16	–	13	.552
Virginia Tech	6	–	6	.500	18	–	10	.643
VCU	5	–	7	.417	14	–	13	.519
Southern Miss	5	–	7	.417	15	–	15	.500
South Florida	2	–	10	.167	10	–	17	.370
† 1994 Metro Conference tournament winner Rankings from AP Poll

The 1993–94 Louisville Cardinals men's basketball team represented the University of Louisville in the 1993–94 NCAA Division I men's basketball season. The head coach was Denny Crum and the team finished the season with an overall record of 28–6.

== Roster ==
1993–94 Louisville Cardinals men's basketball team
Players
Coaches

Pos.	#	Name	Height	Weight	Year	Previous school	Hometown
G/F	23	Greg Minor	6 ft 6 in (1.98 m)	205 lb (93 kg)	Jr	Washington Co.	Sandersville, Georgia
F/C	44	Clifford Rozier	6 ft 11 in (2.11 m)	235 lb (107 kg)	Jr	Southeast	Bradenton, Florida
F	50	Dwayne Morton	6 ft 7 in (2.01 m)	190 lb (86 kg)	Jr	Central	Louisville, Kentucky

Head coach

- Denny Crum (UCLA)

Assistant coach(es)

Legend

- (C) Team captain
- (S) Suspended
- (I) Ineligible
- (W) Walk-on
- Injured
- Current redshirt

== Schedule and results ==
Date time, TV	Rank^{#}	Opponent^{#}	Result	Record	Site city, state
Regular season
Nov 27, 1993*	No. 7	at No. 2 Kentucky	L 70–78	0–1	Rupp Arena; Lexington, Kentucky
Dec 4, 1993*	No. 11	Michigan State	W 77–68	1–1	Freedom Hall; Louisville, Kentucky
Dec 8, 1993*	No. 10	Morehead State	W 107–81	2–1	Freedom Hall; Louisville, Kentucky
Dec 11, 1993*	No. 10	Eastern Kentucky	W 90–66	3–1	Freedom Hall; Louisville, Kentucky
Dec 18, 1993*	No. 10	at Wyoming	W 72–55	4–1	Arena-Auditorium; Laramie, Wyoming
Dec 22, 1993*	No. 11	No. 25 Western Kentucky	W 78–73 ^{OT}	5–1	Freedom Hall; Louisville, Kentucky
Dec 27, 1993*	No. 11	vs. UC Santa Barbara; Rainbow Classic	W 76–53	6–1	Neal S. Blaisdell Center; Honolulu, Hawaii
Dec 28, 1993*	No. 11	vs. Florida; Rainbow Classic	W 83–68	7–1	Neal S. Blaisdell Center; Honolulu, Hawaii
Dec 29, 1993*	No. 11	at Hawaii; Rainbow Classic	W 85–79	8–1	Neal S. Blaisdell Center; Honolulu, Hawaii
Jan 4, 1994*	No. 11	George Mason	W 132–87	9–1	Freedom Hall; Louisville, Kentucky
Jan 6, 1994	No. 11	South Florida	W 80–56	10–1 (1–0)	Freedom Hall; Louisville, Kentucky
Jan 8, 1994	No. 11	VCU	L 89–93 ^{OT}	10–2 (1–1)	Freedom Hall; Louisville, Kentucky
Jan 13, 1994	No. 15	Virginia Tech	W 95–76	11–2 (2–1)	Freedom Hall; Louisville, Kentucky
Jan 15, 1994*	No. 15	No. 17 Georgia Tech	W 88–68	12–2	Freedom Hall; Louisville, Kentucky
Jan 20, 1994	No. 13	at Tulane	W 83–76	13–2 (3–1)	Avron B. Fogelman Arena; New Orleans, Louisiana
Jan 22, 1994	No. 13	Southern Miss	W 70–69	14–2 (4–1)	Freedom Hall; Louisville, Kentucky
Jan 27, 1994	No. 12	at Virginia Tech	W 74–63	15–2 (5–1)	Cassell Coliseum; Blacksburg, Virginia
Jan 29, 1994	No. 12	at VCU	W 94–74	16–2 (6–1)	Richmond Coliseum; Richmond, Virginia
Feb 3, 1994	No. 9	Charlotte	W 76–55	17–2 (7–1)	Freedom Hall; Louisville, Kentucky
Feb 6, 1994*	No. 9	Vanderbilt	W 78–62	18–2	Freedom Hall; Louisville, Kentucky
Feb 10, 1994	No. 7	at South Florida	W 65–50	19–2 (8–1)	Sun Dome; Tampa, Florida
Feb 12, 1994	No. 7	Tulane	W 77–73	20–2 (9–1)	Freedom Hall; Louisville, Kentucky
Feb 17, 1994	No. 5	at Charlotte	L 62–64	20–3 (9–2)	Charlotte Coliseum; Charlotte, North Carolina
Feb 20, 1994*	No. 5	vs. No. 13 Temple	L 53–68	20–4	Orlando Arena; Orlando, Florida
Feb 23, 1994*	No. 13	LSU	W 82–64	21–4	Freedom Hall; Louisville, Kentucky
Feb 26, 1994*	No. 13	at Notre Dame	W 85–82 ^{OT}	22–4	Joyce Center; Notre Dame, Indiana
Feb 28, 1994*	No. 10	at Howard	W 108–65	23–4	Burr Gymnasium; Washington, D.C.
Mar 2, 1994	No. 10	at Southern Miss	W 82–75	24–4 (10–2)	Reed Green Coliseum; Hattiesburg, Mississippi
Mar 6, 1994*	No. 10	at No. 15 UCLA	L 72–75	24–5	Pauley Pavilion (12,243); Los Angeles, California
Metro Conference tournament
Mar 12, 1994*	No. 14	vs. Virginia Tech; Championship game	W 76–67	25–5	Mississippi Coast Coliseum; Biloxi, Mississippi
Mar 13, 1994*	No. 14	vs. Southern Miss; Championship game	W 69–61	26–5	Mississippi Coast Coliseum; Biloxi, Mississippi
NCAA Tournament
Mar 18, 1994*	(3 W) No. 10	vs. (14 W) Boise State; First Round	W 67–58	27–5	ARCO Arena (16,477); Sacramento, California
Mar 20, 1994*	(3 W) No. 10	vs. (6 W) No. 23 Minnesota; Second Round	W 60–55	28–5	ARCO Arena; Sacramento, California
Mar 24, 1994*	(3 W) No. 10	vs. (2 W) No. 9 Arizona; West Regional semifinal – Sweet Sixteen	L 70–82	28–6	L.A. Sports Arena; Los Angeles, California
*Non-conference game. ^{#}Rankings from AP poll. (#) Tournament seedings in parentheses. W=West. All times are in Eastern Time.

== Rankings ==
Ranking movements Legend: ██ Increase in ranking ██ Decrease in ranking
	Week																		
Poll	Pre	1	2	3	4	5	6	7	8	9	10	11	12	13	14	15	16	17	Final
AP	7	7	11	10	10	11	11	11	15	13	12	9	7	5	13	10	14	10	Not released
Coaches	6	11	15	15	13	13	12	12	15	14	12	10	9	6	10	9	9	9	10

*AP did not release post-NCAA Tournament rankings

== NBA draft ==
Round	Pick	Player	NBA club
1	16	Clifford Rozier	Golden State Warriors
1	25	Greg Minor	Los Angeles Clippers
2	45	Dwayne Morton	Golden State Warriors
