= 1990 Metro Conference men's basketball tournament =

- Classification: Division I
- Season: 1989–90
- Teams: 8
- Site: Mississippi Coast Coliseum; Biloxi, MS
- Champions: Louisville (8th title)
- Winning coach: Denny Crum (8th title)
- MVP: LaBradford Smith (Louisville)

1989–90 Metro Conference men's basketball standings
	Conf.				Overall
Team	W		L	PCT	W		L	PCT
No. 16 Louisville †	12	–	2	.857	27	–	8	.771
Southern Miss	9	–	5	.643	20	–	12	.625
Cincinnati	9	–	5	.643	20	–	14	.588
Memphis State	8	–	6	.571	18	–	12	.600
Florida State	6	–	8	.429	16	–	15	.516
South Carolina	6	–	8	.429	14	–	14	.500
Virginia Tech	5	–	9	.357	13	–	18	.419
Tulane	1	–	13	.071	4	–	24	.143
† 1990 Metro Conference tournament winner Rankings from AP Poll

The 1990 Metro Conference men's basketball tournament was held March 8–10 at the Mississippi Coast Coliseum in Biloxi, Mississippi.

Louisville defeated Southern Miss in the championship game, 83–80, to win their eighth Metro men's basketball tournament.

The Cardinals received the conference's automatic bid to the 1990 NCAA Tournament. Southern Miss received an at-large bid.

== Format ==
All eight members of the conference participated. Teams were seeded based on regular season conference records.

== Bracket ==
Quarterfinal; Thursday, March 8
1	Louisville	79
8	Tulane	58
4	Memphis State	71
5	South Carolina	56
3	Cincinnati	65
6	Florida State	64
7	Virginia Tech	67
2	Southern Miss	81

Semifinals; Friday, March 9
1	Louisville	76
4	Memphis State	73
3	Cincinnati	63
2	Southern Miss	75

Championship; Saturday, March 10
1	Louisville	83
2	Southern Miss	80
