= Neil Watson (basketball) =

American basketball player (born 1991)

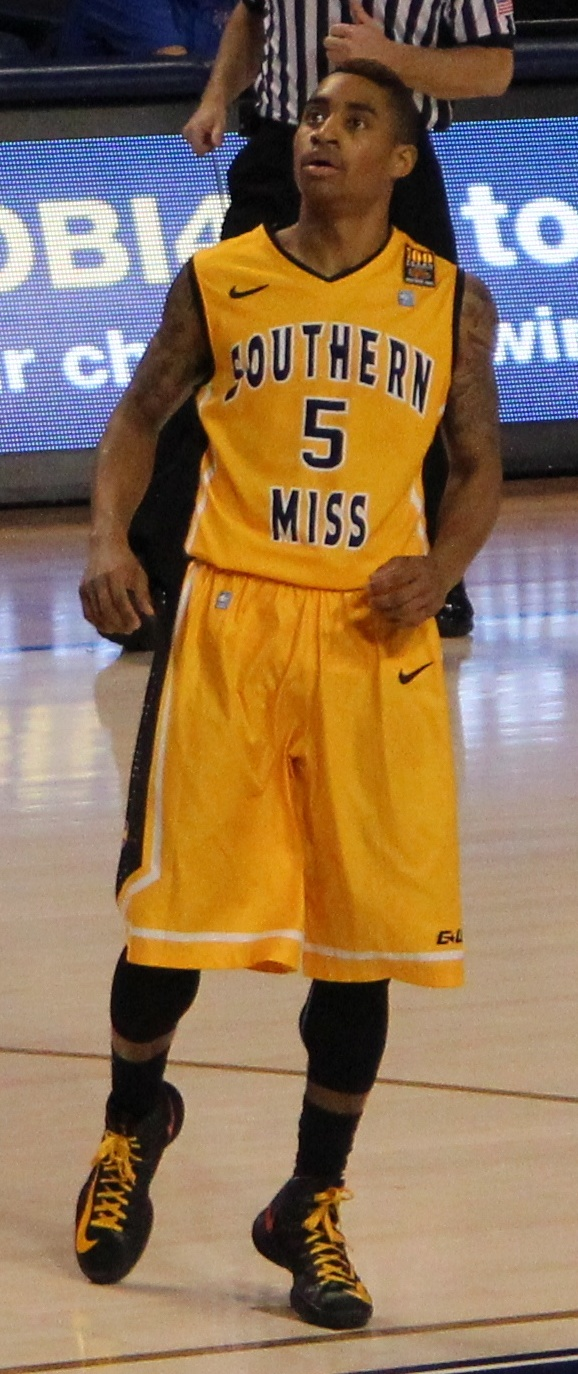
- Watson with Southern Miss in 2013

Personal information
- Born: February 2, 1991 (age 35) Kansas City, Kansas, U.S.
- Listed height: 5 ft 11 in (1.80 m)
- Listed weight: 161 lb (73 kg)

Career information
- High school: Sumner Academy (Kansas City, Kansas)
- College: Coffeyville CC (2010–2011); Southern Miss (2011–2014)
- NBA draft: 2014: undrafted
- Playing career: 2014–present
- Position: Point guard
- Number: 5

Career history
- 2014–2016: Leicester Riders
- 2016: Glasgow Rocks
- 2017: Plymouth Raiders

Neil Watson (born February 2, 1991) is an American former professional basketball player who is currently an assistant coach for Park University. He competed in college basketball for the University of Southern Mississippi.

== Early life and education ==
Watson was born on February 2, 1991, in Kansas City, Kansas. He attended college at Coffeyville Community College and the University of Southern Mississippi.

== Career ==
Out of high school, Watson tried out for the Toledo men's basketball team but was rejected. He transferred to the University of Southern Mississippi under coach Larry Eustachy. Watson's first season with the Golden Eagles resulted in an NCAA Tournament berth along with other starters Maurice Bolden (Sr.) Angelo Johnson (Sr.) Dwayne Davis (Jr.) and Johnathan Mills (Jr.). The Golden Eagles finished 25–9, losing in the first round to the Kansas State Wildcats in the NCAA Tournament.

In Watson's junior season, he carried the Golden Eagles with 9 points, 5 assists, and 2 steals per game. The Golden Eagles lost the Conference USA championship to the Memphis Tigers in double overtime. Watson led the Golden Eagles to the NIT quarterfinal, which they lost to the BYU Cougars. Watson had his best season in his senior year and led the Golden Eagles, averaging 11 points, 5 assists, and 2 steals per game. He was also fourth in the nation in free-throw percentage with 92%. The Golden Eagles made another NIT tournament but lost to the Minnesota Golden Gophers in the quarterfinals. After the loss, Watson was named a starter in the Reese's NCAA Basketball All-Star game.

Watson was not drafted or signed by any NBA or development league roster but was named on the U.K.'s oldest professional basketball team, the Leicester Riders. He departed the Riders at the end of the 2015–16 season eventually joining Glasgow Rocks also in the British Basketball League (BBL).

At the start of the 2017 season, Watson joined the Plymouth Raiders. On February 14, 2018, it was announced that Neil Watson had been released after testing positive for a banned substance.
