= 1986–87 Louisville Cardinals men's basketball team =

American college basketball season

1986–87 Louisville Cardinals men's basketball

Metro Conference Regular Season Champions
- Conference: Metro Conference (1975–1995)
- Record: 18–14 (9–3 Metro)
- Head coach: Denny Crum (16th season)
- Assistant coach: Wade Houston
- Home arena: Freedom Hall

1986–87 Metro Conference men's basketball standings
	Conf.				Overall
Team	W		L	PCT	W		L	PCT
Louisville	9	–	3	.750	18	–	14	.563
Memphis State †	8	–	4	.667	26	–	8	.765
Southern Miss	6	–	6	.500	23	–	11	.676
Florida State	6	–	6	.500	19	–	11	.633
South Carolina	5	–	7	.417	15	–	14	.517
Virginia Tech	5	–	7	.417	10	–	18	.357
Cincinnati	3	–	9	.250	12	–	16	.429
† 1987 Metro Conference tournament winner Rankings from AP Poll

The 1986–87 Louisville Cardinals men's basketball team represented the University of Louisville in the 1986–87 NCAA Division I men's basketball season. The head coach was Denny Crum and the team finished the season with an overall record of 18–14. The team declined an invitation to the 1987 National Invitation Tournament.

== Roster ==
1986–87 Louisville Cardinals men's basketball team
Players
Coaches

Pos.	#	Name	Height	Weight	Year	Previous school	Hometown
G	3	Keith Williams	6 ft 4 in (1.93 m)	180 lb (82 kg)	RS Fr	Seneca	Louisville, Kentucky
F	10	Mark McSwain	6 ft 7 in (2.01 m)	220 lb (100 kg)	Sr	St. Pius	Atlanta, Georgia
G	12	Craig Hawley	6 ft 5 in (1.96 m)	175 lb (79 kg)	Fr	Noblesville	Noblesville, Indiana
G	15	Kevin Walls	6 ft 1 in (1.85 m)	170 lb (77 kg)	So	Camden	Camden, New Jersey
SF	21	Kenny Payne	6 ft 8 in (2.03 m)	195 lb (88 kg)	So	Northeast Jones	Laurel, Mississippi
G	23	Chris West	6 ft 3 in (1.91 m)	175 lb (79 kg)	Sr	duPont Manual	Louisville, Kentucky
F	24	Will Olliges	6 ft 9 in (2.06 m)	205 lb (93 kg)	Jr	St. Xavier	Louisville, Kentucky
F	25	David Robinson	6 ft 8 in (2.03 m)	190 lb (86 kg)	So	Eastside	Gainesville, Florida
F/C	33	Avery Marshall	6 ft 7 in (2.01 m)	210 lb (95 kg)	RS Fr	Myrtle Beach	Myrtle Beach, South Carolina
F	41	Herbert Crook	6 ft 7 in (2.01 m)	190 lb (86 kg)	Jr	Eastern	Louisville, Kentucky
PF	42	Pervis Ellison	6 ft 9 in (2.06 m)	195 lb (88 kg)	So	Savannah	Savannah, Georgia
F	44	Tony Kimbro	6 ft 7 in (2.01 m)	190 lb (86 kg)	So	Seneca	Louisville, Kentucky
C	50	Felton Spencer	7 ft 1 in (2.16 m)	260 lb (118 kg)	Fr	Eastern	Louisville, Kentucky

Head coach

- Denny Crum (UCLA)

Assistant coach(es)

Legend

- (C) Team captain
- (S) Suspended
- (I) Ineligible
- (W) Walk-on
- Injured
- Current redshirt

Roster

== Schedule and results ==
Date time, TV	Rank^{#}	Opponent^{#}	Result	Record	Site city, state
Regular Season
Nov 28, 1986*	No. 2	vs. Northeastern; Great Alaska Shootout	L 84–88 ^{OT}	0–1	Sullivan Arena; Anchorage, Alaska
Nov 29, 1986*	No. 2	vs. Washington; Great Alaska Shootout	L 54–69	0–2	Sullivan Arena; Anchorage, Alaska
Nov 30, 1986*	No. 2	vs. Texas; Great Alaska Shootout	L 70–74	0–3	Sullivan Arena; Anchorage, Alaska
Dec 6, 1986*		Eastern Kentucky	W 98–86	1–3	Freedom Hall; Louisville, Kentucky
Dec 8, 1986*		Fairleigh Dickinson	W 82–74	2–3	Freedom Hall; Louisville, Kentucky
Dec 10, 1986*		at No. 8 Western Kentucky	W 60–58	3–3	E. A. Diddle Arena; Bowling Green, Kentucky
Dec 13, 1986*		DePaul	L 68–75	3–4	Freedom Hall (19,198); Louisville, Kentucky
Dec 17, 1986*		Tampa	W 68–60	4–4	Freedom Hall; Louisville, Kentucky
Dec 23, 1986*		at No. 8 Indiana	L 58–67	4–5	Assembly Hall; Bloomington, Indiana
Dec 27, 1986*		No. 18 Kentucky	L 51–85	4–6	Freedom Hall; Louisville, Kentucky
Jan 3, 1987*		Rutgers	W 79–49	5–6	Freedom Hall; Louisville, Kentucky
Jan 5, 1987*		Nevada–Reno	W 92–77	6–6	Freedom Hall; Louisville, Kentucky
Jan 7, 1987		at Florida State	W 73–64	7–6 (1–0)	Tallahassee-Leon County Civic Center; Tallahassee, Florida
Jan 10, 1987*		at Wyoming	W 67–64	8–6	Arena-Auditorium; Laramie, Wyoming
Jan 14, 1987		at Southern Miss	L 69–76	8–7 (1–1)	Reed Green Coliseum; Hattiesburg, Mississippi
Jan 18, 1987*		at No. 6 Purdue	L 73–88	8–8	Mackey Arena; West Lafayette, Indiana
Jan 20, 1987		Virginia Tech	W 84–62	9–8 (2–1)	Freedom Hall; Louisville, Kentucky
Jan 22, 1987		Cincinnati	W 81–69	10–8 (3–1)	Freedom Hall; Louisville, Kentucky
Jan 28, 1987		Memphis State	L 48–64	10–9 (3–2)	Freedom Hall; Louisville, Kentucky
Jan 31, 1987*		No. 20 Kansas	L 58–62	10–10	Freedom Hall; Louisville, Kentucky
Feb 2, 1987		South Carolina	W 90–62	11–10 (4–2)	Freedom Hall; Louisville, Kentucky
Feb 5, 1987		at Virginia Tech	W 90–71	12–10 (5–2)	Cassell Coliseum; Blacksburg, Virginia
Feb 7, 1987*		NC State	W 87–75	13–10	Freedom Hall; Louisville, Kentucky
Feb 11, 1987		at South Carolina	W 59–55	14–10 (6–2)	Carolina Coliseum; Columbia, South Carolina
Feb 14, 1987*		at No. 9 Syracuse	L 72–99	14–11	Carrier Dome; Syracuse, New York
Feb 16, 1987		Southern Miss	W 85–84 ^{OT}	15–11 (7–2)	Freedom Hall; Louisville, Kentucky
Feb 18, 1987		Florida State	W 87–71	16–11 (8–2)	Freedom Hall; Louisville, Kentucky
Feb 22, 1987		at Memphis State	L 57–58	16–12 (8–3)	Mid-South Coliseum; Memphis, Tennessee
Feb 25, 1987		at Cincinnati	W 81–69	17–12 (9–3)	Riverfront Coliseum; Cincinnati, Ohio
Feb 28, 1987*		at UCLA	L 86–99	17–13	Pauley Pavilion (11,578); Los Angeles, California
Metro Conference Tournament
Mar 7, 1987*	(1)	(4) Southern Miss; Semifinals	W 78–71	18–13	Freedom Hall; Louisville, Kentucky
Mar 8, 1987*	(1)	(2) Memphis State; Championship game	L 52–75	18–14	Freedom Hall; Louisville, Kentucky
*Non-conference game. ^{#}Rankings from AP Poll. (#) Tournament seedings in parentheses. All times are in Eastern Time.
