= 1987 Metro Conference men's basketball tournament =

- Classification: Division I
- Season: 1986–87
- Teams: 7
- Site: Freedom Hall; Louisville, KY
- Champions: Memphis State (4th title)
- Winning coach: Larry Finch (1st title)
- MVP: Marvin Alexander (Memphis State)

1986–87 Metro Conference men's basketball standings
| | Conf. | | | | Overall |
| Team | W | | L | PCT | W | | L | PCT |
|---|---|---|---|---|---|---|---|---|
| Louisville | 9 | – | 3 | .750 | 18 | – | 14 | .563 |
| Memphis State † | 8 | – | 4 | .667 | 26 | – | 8 | .765 |
| Southern Miss | 6 | – | 6 | .500 | 23 | – | 11 | .676 |
| Florida State | 6 | – | 6 | .500 | 19 | – | 11 | .633 |
| South Carolina | 5 | – | 7 | .417 | 15 | – | 14 | .517 |
| Virginia Tech | 5 | – | 7 | .417 | 10 | – | 18 | .357 |
| Cincinnati | 3 | – | 9 | .250 | 12 | – | 16 | .429 |
† 1987 Metro Conference tournament winner Rankings from AP Poll

The 1987 Metro Conference men's basketball tournament was held March 6–8 at Freedom Hall in Louisville, Kentucky.

Memphis State defeated Louisville in the championship game, 75–52, to win their fourth Metro men's basketball tournament.

Due to sanctions, the Tigers were ineligible to participate in the NCAA Tournament. No other conference teams received at-large bids, leaving the Metro Conference out of the 1987 NCAA Tournament.

== Format ==
All seven of the conference's members participated. They were seeded based on regular season conference records, with the top team earning a bye into the semifinal round. The other six teams entered into the preliminary first round.

== Bracket ==
First round Thursday, March 6
4 | Southern Miss | 83
5 | Virginia Tech | 66
3 | Florida State | 85
6 | South Carolina | 86
7 | Cincinnati | 58
2 | Memphis State | 87

Semifinals; Friday, March 7
1 | Louisville | 78
4 | Southern Miss | 71
6 | South Carolina | 64
2 | Memphis State | 74

Championship; Saturday, March 8
1 | Louisville | 52
2 | Memphis State | 75
