= 1980–81 Penn State Nittany Lions basketball team =

American college basketball season

1980–81 Penn State Nittany Lions men's basketball
- Conference: Independent
- Record: 17–10
- Head coach: Dick Harter (3rd season)
- Assistant coach: Perry Clark (3rd season)
- Home arena: Rec Hall

1980–81 NCAA Division I men's basketball independents standings
| | Conf. | | | | Overall |
| Team | W | | L | PCT | W | | L | PCT |
|---|---|---|---|---|---|---|---|---|
| No. 1 DePaul | | – | | – | 27 | – | 2 | .931 |
| No. 7 Notre Dame | | – | | – | 23 | – | 6 | .793 |
| Southern Miss | | – | | – | 20 | – | 7 | .741 |
| James Madison | | – | | – | 21 | – | 9 | .700 |
| Fordham | | – | | – | 19 | – | 9 | .679 |
| Cleveland State | | – | | – | 18 | – | 9 | .667 |
| Stetson | | – | | – | 18 | – | 9 | .667 |
| Saint Peter's | | – | | – | 17 | – | 9 | .654 |
| Tennessee State | | – | | – | 17 | – | 9 | .654 |
| Marquette | | – | | – | 20 | – | 11 | .645 |
| Old Dominion | | – | | – | 18 | – | 10 | .643 |
| Penn State | | – | | – | 17 | – | 10 | .630 |
| St. Francis (Pa.) | | – | | – | 17 | – | 10 | .630 |
| Siena | | – | | – | 17 | – | 10 | .630 |
| South Carolina | | – | | – | 17 | – | 10 | .630 |
| Dayton | | – | | – | 18 | – | 11 | .621 |
| Long Island | | – | | – | 18 | – | 11 | .621 |
| Texas–Pan American | | – | | – | 18 | – | 11 | .621 |
| Illinois State | | – | | – | 16 | – | 11 | .593 |
| Wagner | | – | | – | 16 | – | 11 | .593 |
| UNLV | | – | | – | 16 | – | 12 | .571 |
| William & Mary | | – | | – | 16 | – | 12 | .571 |
| North Texas State | | – | | – | 15 | – | 12 | .556 |
| Southeastern Louisiana | | – | | – | 14 | – | 13 | .519 |
| Iona | | – | | – | 15 | – | 14 | .517 |
| Richmond | | – | | – | 15 | – | 14 | .517 |
| Fairfield | | – | | – | 13 | – | 13 | .500 |
| UNC Wilmington | | – | | – | 13 | – | 13 | .500 |
| New Orleans | | – | | – | 13 | – | 14 | .481 |
| Towson State | | – | | – | 13 | – | 14 | .481 |
| East Carolina | | – | | – | 12 | – | 14 | .462 |
| Fairleigh Dickinson | | – | | – | 12 | – | 14 | .462 |
| Valparaiso | | – | | – | 12 | – | 15 | .444 |
| Campbell | | – | | – | 11 | – | 16 | .407 |
| George Mason | | – | | – | 10 | – | 16 | .385 |
| St. Francis (N.Y.) | | – | | – | 10 | – | 16 | .385 |
| Navy | | – | | – | 9 | – | 16 | .360 |
| Robert Morris | | – | | – | 9 | – | 18 | .333 |
| Baptist | | – | | – | 8 | – | 19 | .296 |
| Northern Iowa | | – | | – | 8 | – | 19 | .296 |
| Army | | – | | – | 7 | – | 19 | .269 |
| Portland State | | – | | – | 7 | – | 20 | .259 |
| Manhattan | | – | | – | 6 | – | 20 | .231 |
| Nicholls State | | – | | – | 6 | – | 22 | .214 |
| Baltimore | | – | | – | 5 | – | 21 | .192 |
| Catholic | | – | | – | 4 | – | 20 | .167 |
Rankings from AP Poll

The 1980–81 Penn State Nittany Lions basketball team represented Pennsylvania State University in the 1980–81 season.

== Roster ==
1980–81 Penn State Nittany Lions men's basketball team
Players
Coaches

| Pos. | # | Name | Height | Weight | Year | Hometown |
|---|---|---|---|---|---|---|
| F | 43 | Frank Brickowski | 6 ft 9 in (2.06 m) | 232 lb (105 kg) | Sr | Bayville, New York |
| G | 12 | Craig Buffie | 6 ft 3 in (1.91 m) | 185 lb (84 kg) | Jr | Bloomington, Indiana |
| G | 22 | Wally Choice | 6 ft 3 in (1.91 m) | 156 lb (71 kg) | Fr | Montclair, New Jersey |
| F | 24 | Brian Dean | 6 ft 5 in (1.96 m) | 212 lb (96 kg) | Fr | Harrisburg, Pennsylvania |
| G | 10 | Mike Edelman | 6 ft 2 in (1.88 m) | 180 lb (82 kg) | Jr | Havertown, Pennsylvania |
| F | 44 | Rich Fetter | 6 ft 7 in (2.01 m) | 215 lb (98 kg) | So | Riverton, Illinois |
| G | 23 | Jim Forjan | 6 ft 1 in (1.85 m) | 157 lb (71 kg) | Fr | York, Pennsylvania |
| F | 45 | David Griffin | 6 ft 7 in (2.01 m) | 188 lb (85 kg) | Fr | Cleveland, Ohio |
| C | 52 | Mike Lang | 6 ft 9 in (2.06 m) | 240 lb (109 kg) | So | Lombard, Illinois |
| F | 34 | Donnie Mays | 6 ft 5 in (1.96 m) | 193 lb (88 kg) | So | Rubonia, Florida |
| C | 42 | Dick Mumma | 6 ft 10 in (2.08 m) | 200 lb (91 kg) | Fr | Bedford, Pennsylvania |
| G | 20 | Tracy Peal | 6 ft 4 in (1.93 m) | 177 lb (80 kg) | So | Glen Mills, Pennsylvania |
| G | 33 | Jim Solic | 6 ft 4 in (1.93 m) | 193 lb (88 kg) | Jr | State College, Pennsylvania |
| F | 31 | Scott Wolz | 6 ft 7 in (2.01 m) | 208 lb (94 kg) | Jr | Silver Spring, Maryland |

Head coach

- Dick Harter

Assistant coach(es)

- Perry Clark

Legend

- (C) Team captain
- (S) Suspended
- (I) Ineligible
- (W) Walk-on
- Injured
- Current redshirt

== Schedule ==
| Date time, TV | Rank^{#} | Opponent^{#} | Result | Record | Site city, state |
|---|---|---|---|---|---|
| November 28 | | Ursinus | W 101–68 | 1–0 | Rec Hall; University Park, Pennsylvania |
| December 3 | | at Indiana State | W 61–54 | 2–0 | Hulman Center; Terre Haute, Indiana |
| December 6 | | SMU | W 72–50 | 3–0 | Rec Hall; University Park, Pennsylvania |
| December 9 | | at Nebraska | L 50–75 | 3–1 | Bob Devaney Sports Center; Lincoln, Nebraska |
| December 13 | | East Carolina | W 71–59 | 4–1 | Rec Hall; University Park, Pennsylvania |
| December 16 | | at Syracuse | L 63–77 | 4–2 | Carrier Dome; Syracuse, NY |
| December 20 | | at Rutgers | W 78–76 ^{OT} | 5–2 | Louis Brown Athletic Center; Piscataway, NJ |
| December 29 | | vs. Boston College; Music City Tournament | L 67–74 | 5–3 | Memorial Gymnasium; Nashville, Tennessee |
| December 30 | | vs. Tennessee Tech; Music City Tournament | W 69–47 | 6–3 | Memorial Gymnasium; Nashville, Tennessee |
| January 5 | | vs. Lafayette | W 53–42 | 7–3 | Hersheypark Arena; Hershey, Pennsylvania |
| January 6 | | vs. Temple | L 39–43 | 7–4 | Palestra; Philadelphia, Pennsylvania |
| January 10 | | Rider | W 67–59 | 8–4 | Rec Hall; University Park, Pennsylvania |
| January 17 | | Philadelphia Textile | W 87–61 | 9–4 | Rec Hall; University Park, Pennsylvania |
| January 19 | | at Army | W 63–52 | 10–4 | USMA Field House; West Point, NY |
| January 21 | | West Virginia | L 52–55 | 10–5 | Rec Hall; University Park, Pennsylvania |
| January 24 | | Northeastern | L 58–60 | 10–6 | Rec Hall; University Park, Pennsylvania |
| January 26 | | Loyola (PA) | W 88–47 | 11–6 | Rec Hall; University Park, Pennsylvania |
| January 28 | | Colgate | W 87–50 | 12–6 | Rec Hall; University Park, Pennsylvania |
| January 31 | | Westminster | W 65–47 | 13–6 | Rec Hall; University Park, Pennsylvania |
| February 1 | | New Hampshire | W 85–72 | 14–6 | Rec Hall; University Park, Pennsylvania |
| February 4 | | at South Carolina | L 60–70 | 14–7 | Carolina Coliseum; Columbia, SC |
| February 7 | | Navy | W 67–51 | 15–7 | Rec Hall; University Park, Pennsylvania |
| February 11 | | at Pittsburgh | L 63–70 | 15–8 | Fitzgerald Field House; Pittsburgh, Pennsylvania |
| February 14 | | Drexel | W 71–58 | 16–8 | Rec Hall; University Park, Pennsylvania |
| February 18 | | St. Bonaventure | W 64–53 | 17–8 | Rec Hall; University Park, Pennsylvania |
| February 23 | | at Memphis State | L 67–75 | 17–9 | Mid-South Coliseum; Memphis, Tennessee |
| February 25 | | Robert Morris | L 67–75 | 17–10 | Rec Hall; University Park, Pennsylvania |
*Non-conference game. ^{#}Rankings from AP Poll. (#) Tournament seedings in parentheses.
