= Geno Carlisle =

American basketball player (born 1976)

Personal information
- Born: August 13, 1976 (age 50) Grand Rapids, Michigan, U.S.
- Listed height: 6 ft 3 in (1.91 m)
- Listed weight: 200 lb (91 kg)

Career information
- High school: Ottawa Hills (Grand Rapids, Michigan)
- College: Northwestern (1994–1996); California (1997–1999)
- NBA draft: 1999: undrafted
- Playing career: 1999–2009
- Position: Point guard
- Number: 4

Career history
- 1999–2000: Rockford Lightning
- 2000–2001: San Diego Wildfire
- 2001: Pallacanestro Varese
- 2001: Estudiantes
- 2001: Las Vegas Slam
- 2001–2002: AO Dafni Athens
- 2002: Scandone Avellino
- 2002: Marinos de Oriente
- 2002: Mobile Revelers
- 2003: Carife Ferrara
- 2003–2004: Long Beach Jam
- 2004: Al Kuwait BC
- 2004: Portland Trail Blazers
- 2004–2005: Long Beach Jam
- 2005–2006: Yakama Sun Kings
- 2006: Sioux Falls Skyforce
- 2006–2007: Benfica
- 2008: Pınar Karşıyaka
- 2008–2009: Anaheim Arsenal

Career highlights
- First-team All-Big Ten (1996)
- Stats at NBA.com
- Stats at Basketball Reference

Geno Marcellus Carlisle (born August 13, 1976) is an American former professional basketball player. The 6' 3", 200-lb. point guard born in Grand Rapids, Michigan played in several leagues throughout the world.

== Collegiate career ==
Carlisle began his collegiate basketball career at Northwestern University in Evanston, Illinois in 1994. His stellar skills stood out despite the team's overall poor performance, as he started 20 of 26 games as a freshman during the 1994–95 season and led the team in scoring 14 times. As a sophomore, he averaged 19.7 points, 2.6 rebounds and 2.7 assists, and ranked second in the Big Ten Conference in scoring. He scored 39 points in one game against Wisconsin, and made a school-record 17 free throws (out of 20 attempted) in the process. He was named to the All-Big Ten First Team after the season, but the team's overall record during his two seasons was 12–42. After starting as the Wildcats point guard for two seasons, he left the school to transfer to the University of California, Berkeley.

During the summer of 1996, Carlisle was selected, along with the likes of Tim Duncan, Paul Pierce and Chauncey Billups, to participate in USA Basketball's Select 22-and-under team. The team competed against Dream Team III in an exhibition contest in advance of the 1996 Summer Olympics in Auburn Hills, Michigan on July 6, and lost 96–90. Carlisle was scoreless in 6 minutes of play.

Carlisle sat out the 1996–1997 season at Cal, as required by NCAA transfer rules. During his junior season (1997–1998), he led the team in scoring and was named to the Pac-10 All-Newcomer team. As a senior, he averaged 15.9 points and 3.9 assists, and led the California Golden Bears to the post-season National Invitation Tournament title in March 1999. Carlisle converted a three-point play with 4.7 seconds left to lift the Bears to a 61–60 victory over Clemson in the tournament's championship game. He led the team in assists, and set a career high with 10 against Southern California, and scored at least 25 points six times, with a season-high of 29 in a win over North Carolina. Carlisle made 27 consecutive free throws from February 29 to March 6. He was selected honorable mention All-Pac-10 and was team co-Most Valuable Player of the Year.

- While at Northwestern, Geno was quoted as saying: "It may sound cocky, but the only player in Chicago who is better than me is Michael Jordan."

== Professional career ==
Carlisle was not selected in the NBA draft, and instead began his professional career in basketball's minor leagues. He played in the 1999–2000 season for the Rockford Lightning of the CBA, where he averaged 10.6 points in a reserve role. In 2000, he moved to Venezuela to play for Marinos de Oriente. In 2000–01, he started the season with the San Diego Wildfire in the American Basketball Association, averaging 22.8 points, before moving on to Rooster Varese in Italy, where he averaged 24.7 points in 10 games, and later Adecco Estudiantes Madrid for the ACB playoffs. In 2001–02, he started the season with the ABA's Las Vegas Slam, but shortly moved back to Italy to play for De Vizia Scandone Avellino, where he appeared in 6 games and averaged 17.7 points.

During the 2002–2003 season, he played briefly for the Mobile Revelers of the NBDL, as well as Italy's Carife Ferrara (Serie A2). In 2003–2004, Carlisle played for the ABA's Long Beach Jam, as well as Venezuela's Guaiqueríes de Margarita and Kuwait's Al Kuwait SC. In 2005, he returned to the Jam and, in 2006, joined the Yakama Sun Kings of the CBA.

Though he spent many seasons with foreign teams and in the minor leagues, Carlisle continued to pursue his goal of making an NBA roster. He played for the Denver Nuggets in the 2001 Rocky Mountain Summer League and for the Orlando Magic in the 2004 Pepsi Pro Summer League. He also spent 6 games with the Portland Trail Blazers during the 2004-05 NBA season.

In 2006/07, he played in Portugal for Benfica.

== Personal life ==
Geno's father, Clarence, was selected by the Detroit Pistons in the 1973 NBA draft, but was cut from the team the day before the season began.
