= Glen Whisby =

American basketball player and coach

Personal information
- Born: June 29, 1972 Chicago, Illinois
- Died: September 21, 2017 (aged 44)
- Listed height: 6 ft 8 in (2.03 m)

Career information
- High school: Brookhaven (Brookhaven, Mississippi)
- College: Southern Miss (1991–1995)
- NBA draft: 1995: undrafted
- Playing career: 1995–2009
- Position: Center
- Number: 32, 7, 18

Career history

Playing
- 1995–1996: Gijón Baloncesto
- 1996: Florida Sharks
- 1996–1998: Estudiantes
- 1998–1999: Pallacanestro Cantù
- 1999: Gijón Baloncesto
- 2000: Aurora Basket Jesi
- 2000–2001: UNICS
- 2001–2002: Fenerbahçe
- 2002–2003: Polonia Warszawa
- 2003: JDA Dijon Basket
- 2003–2004: Tuborg Pilsener
- 2004–2005: Basket Club Ferrara
- 2005–2006: Galatasaray
- 2006–2007: Hyeres-Toulon
- 2008: Lappeenrannan NMKY
- 2008–2009: Basketbal Pezinok

Coaching
- 2014–2015: Seton Hill University (assistant)

Career highlights
- USBL champion (1996); Second-team Parade All-American (1991)

Glen Whisby Jr. (June 29, 1972 – September 21, 2017) was an American professional basketball player. Standing at 6 ft 8 in (2.03 m), he played the center position. He played college basketball at the University of Southern Mississippi.

== College career ==
Whisby attended Brookhaven High School and played for school team. After graduation from high school, he attended University of Southern Mississippi where he played for Golden Eagles from 1991 to 1995. Whisby averaged 13.8 points per game during his career at Southern Miss, and is ninth on the all-time points list with 1,598. He was a three-time All-Metro Conference selection during his Golden Eagle career. He ranks second to Clarence Weatherspoon for career blocks (222) and ninth in scoring (1,598 points).

== Professional career ==
Following graduation, Whisby was drafted by Fort Wayne Fury of the Continental Basketball Association in the second round (29th overall) of the 1995 CBA draft. Instead, he went overseas in 1995 to play for Gijon Baloncesto in Spain and following season, spent the summer playing for the USBL's Florida Sharks, before going back to Spain to join Estudiantes. In 1998–99, Whisby played with Pallacanestro Cantu of Italy, before heading back to Spain in 1999–00 to play for Gijon. In 2000, Whisby joined Aurora Basket Jesi of Italy.

In 2000–01, Whisby played in Russia with UNICS, and in 2001–02 he played in Turkey with Fenerbahçe. In 2002–03, he played in Poland with Polonia Warszawa and in France with JDA Dijon Basket. For the 2003–04 season he moved to Tuborg Pilsener of Turkey, then he played one season in Italian LegaDue Basket with Basket Club Ferrara, before returning to Turkey in 2005–06 to play with Galatasaray. In 2006–07, he played in France with Hyeres-Toulon. In 2008, he played with Lappeenrannan NMKY of Finland and his last club was Basketbal Pezinok of Slovakia.

== Post-playing career ==
He worked at Seton Hill University as assistant men's basketball coach during the 2014–15 season.

Whisby died on September 22, 2017, at the age of 45 after suffering a heart attack.
