= Randolph Keys =

American basketball player (born 1966)

Personal information
- Born: April 19, 1966 (age 60) Collins, Mississippi, U.S.
- Listed height: 6 ft 7 in (2.01 m)
- Listed weight: 195 lb (88 kg)

Career information
- High school: Collins (Collins, Mississippi)
- College: Southern Miss (1984–1988)
- NBA draft: 1988: 1st round, 22nd overall pick
- Drafted by: Cleveland Cavaliers
- Playing career: 1988–2000
- Position: Small forward / shooting guard
- Number: 31, 8

Career history
- 1988–1990: Cleveland Cavaliers
- 1990–1991: Charlotte Hornets
- 1991: Benetton Treviso
- 1991–1992: Paris Basket Racing
- 1992–1993: Taugrés Vitoria
- 1993–1995: Quad City Thunder
- 1995: Los Angeles Lakers
- 1995–1996: Milwaukee Bucks
- 1996–1999: Verona
- 1999: Panionios B.C.

Career highlights
- CBA champion (1994); All-CBA Second Team (1995); CBA All-Defensive Team (1995); 2× Second-team All-Metro Conference (1987, 1988); NIT champion (1987); NIT MVP (1987)

Career NBA statistics
- Points: 1,262 (5.2 ppg)
- Rebounds: 551 (2.3 rpg)
- Assists: 192 (0.8 apg)
- Stats at NBA.com
- Stats at Basketball Reference

Randolph Keys (born April 19, 1966) is an American former professional basketball player who played five National Basketball Association (NBA) seasons in his career for the Cleveland Cavaliers, Charlotte Hornets, Los Angeles Lakers and Milwaukee Bucks.

== Career ==
Keys was selected by the Cavaliers in the first round (22nd pick overall) of the 1988 NBA draft. His best year as a pro came during the 1989–90 season when he split time between the Cavaliers and Hornets, appearing in 80 games and averaging 8.8 points per game. Keys played collegiately at the University of Southern Mississippi. He was the last Laker to wear number #8 before Kobe Bryant.

Keys played for the Quad City Thunder of the Continental Basketball Association (CBA) from 1993 to 1995. He won a CBA championship with the Thunder in 1994. He was selected to the All-CBA Second Team and All-Defensive Team in 1995.

== Personal ==
His daughter Jasmine Keys played the 2020 Summer Olympics for Italy women's national basketball team.

== NBA career statistics ==
Legend
GP	Games played	GS	Games started	MPG	Minutes per game
FG%	Field goal percentage	3P%	3-point field goal percentage	FT%	Free throw percentage
RPG	Rebounds per game	APG	Assists per game	SPG	Steals per game
BPG	Blocks per game	PPG	Points per game	**Bold**	Career high

=== Regular season ===
Year	Team	GP	GS	MPG	FG%	3P%	FT%	RPG	APG	SPG	BPG	PPG
1988–89	Cleveland	42	0	7.9	.430	.100	.690	1.3	0.5	0.3	0.1	4.0
1989–90	Cleveland	48	**13**	18.6	.421	.200	.744	2.9	0.8	0.8	0.0	7.6
1989–90	Charlotte	32	5	**22.6**	**.445**	**.364**	.690	**3.6**	**1.5**	**0.9**	0.2	**10.5**
1990–91	Charlotte	44	0	10.8	.407	.214	.576	2.3	0.4	0.5	**0.3**	3.2
1994–95	Los Angeles	6	0	13.8	.346	.000	**1.000**	2.8	0.3	0.2	**0.3**	3.3
1995–96	Milwaukee	**69**	1	11.8	.418	.310	.837	1.8	0.9	0.5	0.2	3.4
Career		241	19	13.8	.425	.272	.721	2.3	0.8	0.6	0.2	5.2

=== Playoffs ===
Year	Team	GP	GS	MPG	FG%	3P%	FT%	RPG	APG	SPG	BPG	PPG
1988–89	Cleveland	1	0	12.0	.000	.000	.000	3.0	1.0	0.0	0.0	0.0
