= Southern Miss Golden Eagles basketball =

College basketball team

2026–27 Southern Miss Golden Eagles basketball team
- University: University of Southern Mississippi
- Head coach: Jay Ladner (8th season)
- Location: Hattiesburg, Mississippi
- Arena: Reed Green Coliseum (capacity: 8,095)
- Conference: Sun Belt Conference
- Nickname: Golden Eagles
- Colors: Black and gold

NCAA Division I tournament appearances
- 1990, 1991, 2012

Conference regular-season champions
- 1991, 2001, 2023

Conference division champions
- 2001

NIT champions
- 1987

Uniforms
Home	Away	Alternate

The Southern Miss Golden Eagles basketball program represents intercollegiate men's basketball at the University of Southern Mississippi. The school competes in the Sun Belt Conference in Division I of the NCAA and plays their home games at Reed Green Coliseum, which has a capacity of 8,095. The Golden Eagles have appeared three times in the NCAA Division I men's basketball tournament, most recently in 2012.

== History ==
From its first season (1912–13), when Coach R. G. Slay led the team to a 3–0 record, the men's basketball team has enjoyed its share of success. Coach A. B. Dille took over coaching duties the following year. The Golden Eagles have appeared in the NAIA National Tournament four times in a row (1952, 1953, 1954 and 1955). Southern Miss had a 2–4 record in the NAIA Tournament.

Over the years, the Golden Eagles have had three NCAA tournament teams (1990, 1991, 2012). The program has also had an NIT Championship team with its run in the 1987 postseason tournament. In all the Eagles have earned ten NIT bids: 1981, 1986, 1987, 1988, 1994, 1995, 1998, 2001, 2013, 2014 and 2023.

They also earned a CIT bid in 2010 and a CBI bid in 2019.

The team has had six players drafted including Clarence Weatherspoon. Southern Miss has won three conference championships in basketball including the 2023 outright regular-season title.

== Postseason ==
=== NCAA tournament results ===
Southern Miss Golden Eagles have appeared in three NCAA tournaments. They have an overall 0–3 record in tournament games. Darrin Chancellor holds the Southern Miss single-tournament scoring record with 24 points in 1991.

Year	Seed	Round	Opponent	Result
1990	#13	Round of 64	#4 LaSalle	L 63–79
1991	#11	Round of 64	#6 NC State	L 85–114
2012	#9	Round of 64	#8 Kansas State	L 64–70

=== NIT results ===
The Golden Eagles have appeared in the National Invitation Tournament (NIT) 11 times. Their combined record is 11–10 and they were NIT Champions in 1987.

Year	Round	Opponent	Result
1981	First Round	Holy Cross	L 54–58
1986	First Round	Florida	L 71–81
1987	First Round; Second Round; Quarterfinals; Semifinals; Finals	Mississippi; Saint Louis; Vanderbilt; Nebraska; La Salle	W 93–75; W 83–78; W 95–88; W 82–75; W 84–80
1988	First Round; Second Round	Clemson; VCU	W 74–69; L 89–93
1994	First Round	Clemson	L 85–96
1995	First Round	St. Bonaventure	L 70–75
1998	First Round	Auburn	L 62–77
2001	First Round	Mississippi State	L 68–75
2013	First Round; Second Round; Quarterfinals	Charleston Southern; Louisiana Tech; BYU	W 78–71; W 63–52; L 62–79
2014	First Round; Second Round; Quarterfinals	Toledo; Missouri; Minnesota	W 66–59; W 71–63; L 73–81
2023	First Round	UAB	L 60–88

=== CIT ===
The Golden Eagles have appeared in the CollegeInsider.com Postseason Tournament (CIT) one time. Their record is 0–1.

Year	Round	Opponent	Result
2010	First Round	Louisiana Tech	L 57–66

=== CBI ===
The Golden Eagles have appeared in the College Basketball Invitational (CBI) one time. Their record is 0–1

Year	Round	Opponent	Result
2019	First Round	Longwood	L 68–90

=== NAIA tournament results ===
The Golden Eagles have appeared in the NAIA Tournament four times. Their combined record is 2–4.

Year	Round	Opponent	Result
1952	First Round	New Mexico State	L 70–86
1953	First Round; Second Round; Quarterfinals	River Falls State; Loyola (MD); Hamline	W 106–72; W 94–83; L 92–102
1954	First Round	Gustavus Adolphus	L 64–104
1955	First Round	Steubenville	L 62–79

== Notable alumni ==
- Joe Dawson '82 – former professional basketball player, 1992 Israeli Basketball Premier League MVP
- Randolph Keys '88 – former NBA basketball player, 1st Round draft pick (retired)
- Wendell Ladner '70 – former ABA player (deceased)
- Don Maestri '68 – men's basketball head coach Troy University
- Kelly McCarty '98 – former professional basketball player
- Elvin Mims '02 – PBL, USBL, NBL player, 6x champion
- Clarence Weatherspoon '92 – former NBA basketball player
- Glen Whisby '95 – former professional basketball player (deceased)
