= 1986–87 Virginia Cavaliers men's basketball team =

American college basketball season

1986–87 Virginia Cavaliers men's basketball

NCAA tournament, Round of 64
- Conference: Atlantic Coast Conference
- Record: 21–10 (8–6 ACC)
- Head coach: Terry Holland (13th season)
- Assistant coaches: Jeff Jones (5th season); Dave Odom (5th season)
- Home arena: University Hall

1986–87 ACC men's basketball standings
	Conf.				Overall
Team	W		L	PCT	W		L	PCT
No. 2 North Carolina	14	–	0	1.000	32	–	4	.889
No. 13 Clemson	10	–	4	.714	25	–	6	.806
No. 17 Duke	9	–	5	.643	24	–	9	.727
Virginia	8	–	6	.571	21	–	10	.677
Georgia Tech	7	–	7	.500	16	–	13	.552
NC State †	6	–	8	.429	20	–	14	.588
Wake Forest	2	–	12	.143	14	–	15	.483
Maryland	0	–	14	.000	9	–	17	.346
† 1987 ACC tournament winner Rankings from AP Poll

The 1986–87 Virginia Cavaliers men's basketball team represented the University of Virginia during the 1986–87 NCAA Division I men's basketball season. The team was led by 13th-year head coach Terry Holland, and played their home games at University Hall in Charlottesville, Virginia as members of the Atlantic Coast Conference.

== Roster ==
1986–87 Virginia Cavaliers men's basketball team
Players
Coaches

Pos.	#	Name	Height	Weight	Year	Hometown
G	10	John Johnson	6 ft 0 in (1.83 m)	—	Jr	Brooklyn, New York
G	11	Richard Morgan	6 ft 3 in (1.91 m)	190 lb (86 kg)	So	Salem, Virginia
F	21	Mel Kennedy	6 ft 5 in (1.96 m)	—	Jr	Long Island, New York
C	22	Tom Sheehey	6 ft 9 in (2.06 m)	—	Sr	Rochester, New York
G	32	Lance Blanks	6 ft 4 in (1.93 m)	190 lb (86 kg)	So	The Woodlands, Texas
F	34	Bill Batts	6 ft 8 in (2.03 m)	—	So
F	42	Andrew Kennedy	6 ft 7 in (2.01 m)	205 lb (93 kg)	Sr	Kingston, Jamaica

Head coach

- Terry Holland (Davidson)

Assistant coach(es)

- Jeff Jones (Virginia)

Legend

- (C) Team captain
- (S) Suspended
- (I) Ineligible
- (W) Walk-on
- Injured
- Current redshirt

== Schedule and results ==
Date time, TV	Rank^{#}	Opponent^{#}	Result	Record	Site (attendance) city, state
Non-conference regular season
Nov 21, 1986*		Temple; Preseason NIT	L 75–79	0–1	University Hall; Charlottesville, Virginia
Dec 3, 1986*		VMI	W 81–69	1–1	University Hall; Charlottesville, Virginia
Dec 6, 1986*		Southern Illinois	W 94–82	2–1	University Hall; Charlottesville, Virginia
Dec 7, 1986*		George Mason	W 73–58	3–1	University Hall; Charlottesville, Virginia
Dec 10, 1986*		East Tennessee State	W 83–56	4–1	University Hall; Charlottesville, Virginia
Dec 20, 1986*		vs. Arkansas	W 78–66	5–1	
Dec 27, 1986*		at No. 15 St. John's; ECAC Holiday Festival	L 58–64	5–2	Madison Square Garden; New York, New York
Dec 28, 1986*		vs. Rutgers; ECAC Holiday Festival	W 74–56	6–2	Madison Square Garden; New York, New York
ACC regular season
Jan 3, 1987		No. 20 Duke	L 63–70	6–3 (0–1)	University Hall; Charlottesville, Virginia
Jan 5, 1987*		Brown	W 92–70	7–3	University Hall; Charlottesville, Virginia
Jan 7, 1987*		Missouri	W 66–50	8–3	University Hall; Charlottesville, Virginia
Jan 10, 1987		at Maryland	W 71–64	9–3 (1–1)	Cole Fieldhouse; College Park, Maryland
Jan 14, 1987*		No. 3 North Carolina	L 80–95	9–4 (1–2)	University Hall; Charlottesville, Virginia
Jan 17, 1987*		Villanova	W 88–59	10–4	University Hall; Charlottesville, Virginia
Jan 19, 1987*		at Jacksonville	W 82–81	11–4	Jacksonville Memorial Coliseum; Jacksonville, Florida
Jan 22, 1987*		at Georgia Tech	W 61–58	12–4 (2–2)	Alexander Memorial Coliseum; Atlanta, Georgia
Jan 24, 1987*		Wake Forest	W 78–63	13–4 (3–2)	University Hall; Charlottesville, Virginia
Jan 28, 1987		NC State	W 61–60	14–4 (4–2)	University Hall; Charlottesville, Virginia
Jan 31, 1987		at No. 14 Clemson	L 83–89	14–5 (4–3)	Littlejohn Coliseum; Clemson, South Carolina
Feb 4, 1987		at No. 16 Duke	L 61–75	14–6 (4–4)	Cameron Indoor Stadium; Durham, North Carolina
Feb 8, 1987		at No. 3 North Carolina	L 73–74	14–7 (4–5)	Dean Smith Center; Chapel Hill, North Carolina
Feb 11, 1987*		vs. Virginia Tech	W 91–73	15–7	
Feb 14, 1987		No. 12 Clemson	L 90–94	15–8 (4–6)	University Hall; Charlottesville, Virginia
Feb 16, 1987*		at Dayton	W 74–67	16–8	University of Dayton Arena; Dayton, Ohio
Feb 18, 1987		Georgia Tech	W 60–58	17–8 (5–6)	University Hall; Charlottesville, Virginia
Feb 22, 1987		at NC State	W 72–65	18–8 (6–6)	Reynolds Coliseum; Raleigh, North Carolina
Feb 25, 1987		at Wake Forest	W 59–45	19–8 (7–6)	Winston-Salem Memorial Coliseum; Winston-Salem, North Carolina
Mar 1, 1987		Maryland	W 82–77	20–8 (8–6)	University Hall; Charlottesville, Virginia
ACC Tournament
Mar 6, 1987*		vs. Georgia Tech; Quarterfinals	W 55–54	21–8	Capital Centre; Landover, Maryland
Mar 7, 1987*		vs. No. 2 North Carolina; Semifinals	L 82–84 ^{2OT}	21–9	Capital Centre; Landover, Maryland
NCAA Tournament
Mar 12, 1987*	(5 W)	vs. (12 W) Wyoming; First round	L 60–64	21–10	Jon M. Huntsman Center; Salt Lake City, Utah
*Non-conference game. ^{#}Rankings from AP Poll. (#) Tournament seedings in parentheses. W=West. All times are in Eastern time.
