= 1987 Pacific-10 Conference men's basketball tournament =

- Classification: Division I
- Season: 1986–87
- Teams: 10
- Site: Pauley Pavilion; Los Angeles, California
- Champions: UCLA (1st title)
- Winning coach: Walt Hazzard (1st title)
- MVP: Reggie Miller (UCLA)
- Attendance: 37,662 (5 sessions)
- Top scorer: Reggie Miller (UCLA) (83 points)

1986–87 Pacific-10 Conference men's basketball standings
	Conf.				Overall
Team	W		L	PCT	W		L	PCT
No. 15 UCLA †	14	–	4	.778	25	–	7	.781
Arizona	13	–	5	.722	18	–	12	.600
Washington	10	–	8	.556	20	–	15	.571
California	10	–	8	.556	20	–	15	.571
Oregon State	10	–	8	.556	19	–	11	.633
Stanford	9	–	9	.500	15	–	13	.536
Oregon	8	–	10	.444	16	–	14	.533
Arizona State	6	–	12	.333	11	–	17	.393
Washington State	6	–	12	.333	10	–	18	.357
USC	4	–	14	.222	9	–	19	.321
† 1987 Pacific-10 Tournament winner As of March 25, 1987; Rankings from AP poll

The 1987 Pacific-10 Conference men's basketball tournament was played March 5–8 at Pauley Pavilion in Los Angeles, California, on the UCLA campus. The champion of the tournament was host UCLA, which received the Pac-10's automatic bid to the NCAA tournament. The Most Outstanding Player was Reggie Miller of UCLA.

This was the inaugural Pac-10 tournament. The format ran for four years, through 1990.

== Seeds ==
All ten schools participated; teams were seeded by conference record, with a tiebreaker system used to seed teams with identical conference records.

== Bracket ==
Play-in Round; Thursday, March 5
8	Arizona State	76
9	Washington State	60
7	Oregon	51
10	USC	49

Quarterfinals; Friday, March 6
1	#18 UCLA	99
8	Arizona State	83
4	California	64
5	Oregon State	57
3	Washington	86
6	Stanford	71
2	Arizona	63
7	Oregon	72

Semifinals; Saturday, March 7
1	#18 UCLA	75
4	California	68
3	Washington	70
7	Oregon	56

Final; Sunday, March 8
1	#18 UCLA	76
3	Washington	64

There were no overtime games

== All tournament team ==
- Reggie Miller, UCLA
- Pooh Richardson, UCLA
- Anthony Taylor, Oregon
- Chris Welp, Washington
- Phil Zevenbergen, Washington

== Aftermath ==
- Oregon's win over #2 Arizona was the only upset of the 1987 tournament.
- UCLA defeated Washington, who had swept them in the regular season.
- The UCLA–Arizona State quarterfinal set a number of scoring records that still stand.
- UCLA received the automatic bid to the 1987 NCAA Division I men's basketball tournament. Arizona was the only other team that received an at-large bid to the NCAA tournament.
- Washington, California, and Oregon State were invited to the NIT.
- Attendance for the sessions peaked at 9,352 for the Saturday game session, which were the semi-finals.
- Sunday's championship game had an attendance of 9,117 in the 12,829-seat Pauley Pavilion.
- Reggie Miller scored an individual tournament record of 83 points (3 games) which still stands as of 2022. Miller also set the individual tournament record 27 field goals (49 attempts).
- During the selection show for the 1987 NCAA tournament, there was a spot left open for the #12 seed in the Southeast Region. Kansas, the 5th seed in the region, was due to face either Washington or Houston in the first round. Washington was facing UCLA in the finals of the Pac-10 tournament at the time the selections were announced. UCLA held on to defeat Washington 76-62, putting Houston into the field of 64.
