= 1986–87 Alabama Crimson Tide men's basketball team =

American college basketball season

1986–87 Alabama Crimson Tide men's basketball

SEC Regular Season Champions SEC tournament champions

NCAA tournament, Sweet Sixteen (vacated)
- Conference: Southeastern Conference

Ranking
- Coaches: No. 9
- AP: No. 9
- Record: 26–4, 2 wins vacated (16–2 SEC)
- Head coach: Wimp Sanderson (7th season)
- Home arena: Coleman Coliseum

1986–87 Southeastern Conference men's basketball standings
	Conf.				Overall
Team	W		L	PCT	W		L	PCT
No. 9 Alabama †	16	–	2	.889	28	–	5	.848
Florida	12	–	6	.667	23	–	11	.676
Georgia	10	–	8	.556	18	–	12	.600
Kentucky	10	–	8	.556	18	–	11	.621
Auburn	9	–	9	.500	18	–	13	.581
Ole Miss	8	–	10	.444	15	–	14	.517
LSU	8	–	10	.444	24	–	15	.615
Tennessee	7	–	11	.389	14	–	15	.483
Vanderbilt	7	–	11	.389	18	–	16	.529
Mississippi State	3	–	15	.167	7	–	21	.250
† 1987 SEC tournament winner Rankings from AP Poll

The 1986–87 Alabama Crimson Tide men's basketball team represented the University of Alabama in the 1986–87 NCAA Division I men's basketball season. The team's head coach was Wimp Sanderson, who was in his seventh season at Alabama. The team played their home games at Coleman Coliseum in Tuscaloosa, Alabama. They finished the season with a school-record 28 wins at 28–5 and won the Southeastern Conference regular season title with a 16–2 conference record. The 16 wins in conference were also a school record.

The team lost forward Buck Johnson to graduation, but signed freshman forward Keith Askins from Athens High School in Athens, Alabama.

The Tide also won the 1987 SEC men's basketball tournament, beating LSU in the final and earning an automatic bid to the 1987 NCAA Division I men's basketball tournament. They were seeded second in the Southeast Region, their highest ever in the NCAA tournament thus far. The Tide defeated North Carolina A&T and New Orleans before falling to Providence in the Sweet 16. It was the Tide's third straight Sweet 16 appearance. Alabama's participation in the NCAA Tournament was later vacated by the NCAA.

== Roster ==
1986–87 Alabama Crimson Tide men's basketball team
Players
Coaches

Pos.	#	Name	Height	Weight	Year	Previous school	Hometown
F	45	Michael Ansley	6 ft 7 in (2.01 m)	—	So	Jackson-Olin High School	Birmingham, Alabama
G	23	Mark Gottfried	6 ft 4 in (1.93 m)	—	Sr
F/C	31	Derrick McKey	6 ft 9 in (2.06 m)	—	Jr	Meridian High School	Meridian, MS
G	30	Terry Coner	6 ft 3 in (1.91 m)	—	Sr
G	24	Craig Dudley	6 ft 4 in (1.93 m)	—	Jr
F	21	Jim Farmer	6 ft 4 in (1.93 m)	—	Sr
G	11	James Jackson	5 ft 11 in (1.8 m)	—
F	41	Keith Askins	6 ft 6 in (1.98 m)	—	Fr	Athens High School	Athens, Alabama
	52	William DeVaughn	6 ft 9 in (2.06 m)	—	So

Head coach

- Wimp Sanderson

Assistant coach(es)

Legend

- (C) Team captain
- (S) Suspended
- (I) Ineligible
- (W) Walk-on
- Injured
- Current redshirt

== Schedule and results ==
Date time, TV	Rank^{#}	Opponent^{#}	Result	Record	Site city, state
Regular season
Nov 28, 1986*	No. 13	at Louisiana-Monroe	W 82–56	1–0	Fant-Ewing Coliseum; Monroe, Louisiana
Dec 1, 1986*	No. 13	Furman	W 96–69	2–0	Coleman Coliseum; Tuscaloosa, Alabama
Dec 6, 1986*	No. 8	at Florida State	L 71–72	2–1	Donald L. Tucker Center; Tallahassee, Florida
Dec 10, 1986*	No. 18	vs. No. 20 Arkansas	W 87–76	3–1	Birmingham-Jefferson Civic Center; Birmingham, Alabama
Dec 13, 1986*	No. 18	vs. Duke	L 67–76	3–2	Brendan Byrne Arena; East Rutherford, New Jersey
Dec 20, 1986*		Appalachian State	W 95–62	4–2	Coleman Coliseum; Tuscaloosa, Alabama
Dec 22, 1986		at Georgia	W 71–70	5–2 (1–0)	Stegeman Coliseum; Athens, Georgia
Dec 29, 1986*		vs. Penn; BMA Holiday Classic	W 110–68	6–2	Kemper Arena; Kansas City, Missouri
Dec 30, 1986*		vs. Missouri; BMA Holiday Classic	W 91–82	7–2	Kemper Arena; Kansas City, Missouri
Jan 3, 1987		Mississippi State	W 64–49	8–2 (2–0)	Coleman Coliseum; Tuscaloosa, Alabama
Jan 7, 1987; 7:00 p.m., JPT		at No. 9 Kentucky	W 69–55	9–2 (3–0)	Rupp Arena; Lexington, Kentucky
Jan 10, 1987*		Vanderbilt	W 75–71	10–2 (4–0)	Coleman Coliseum; Tuscaloosa, Alabama
Jan 12, 1987*		South Carolina	W 73–63	11–2	Coleman Coliseum; Tuscaloosa, Alabama
Jan 14, 1987	No. 15	LSU	W 69–65	12–2 (5–0)	Coleman Coliseum; Tuscaloosa, Alabama
Jan 17, 1987; 2:00 p.m., JPT	No. 15	at Ole Miss	W 71–62	13–2 (6–0)	Tad Smith Coliseum; Oxford, Mississippi
Jan 21, 1987	No. 13	No. 17 Auburn	W 88–82	14–2 (7–0)	Coleman Coliseum; Tuscaloosa, Alabama
Jan 24, 1987	No. 13	at Tennessee	W 82–71	15–2 (8–0)	Stokely Athletic Center; Knoxville, Tennessee
Jan 28, 1987	No. 9	at No. 19 Florida	L 80–90 ^{OT}	15–3 (8–1)	Stephen C. O'Connell Center; Gainesville, Florida
Jan 31, 1987	No. 9	Georgia	W 83–74 ^{OT}	16–3 (9–1)	Coleman Coliseum; Tuscaloosa, Alabama
Feb 4, 1987	No. 9	at Mississippi State	W 76–55	17–3 (10–1)	Humphrey Coliseum; Starkville, Mississippi
Feb 7, 1987*	No. 9	Kentucky	L 69–70	17–4 (10–2)	Coleman Coliseum; Tuscaloosa, Alabama
Feb 11, 1987; 7:00 p.m., JPT	No. 14	at Vanderbilt	W 71–67	18–4 (11–2)	Memorial Gymnasium; Nashville, Tennessee
Feb 14, 1987	No. 14	at LSU	W 60–52	19–4 (12–2)	Maravich Assembly Center; Baton Rouge, Louisiana
Feb 18, 1987	No. 12	Ole Miss	W 90–69	20–4 (13–2)	Coleman Coliseum; Tuscaloosa, Alabama
Feb 21, 1987; 2:00 p.m., JPT	No. 12	at Auburn	W 77–75	21–4 (14–2)	Beard-Eaves-Memorial Coliseum; Auburn, Alabama
Feb 25, 1987	No. 10	Tennessee	W 93–71	22–4 (15–2)	Coleman Coliseum; Tuscaloosa, Alabama
Feb 28, 1987; 2:00 p.m., JPT	No. 10	No. 18 Florida	W 86–85	23–4 (16–2)	Coleman Coliseum; Tuscaloosa, Alabama
SEC Tournament
Mar 6, 1987*; JPT	(1) No. 9	vs. (8) Tennessee; Quarterfinals	W 68–60	24–4	The Omni; Atlanta, Georgia
Mar 7, 1987*; JPT	(1) No. 9	vs. (5) Auburn; Semifinals	W 87–68	25–4	The Omni; Atlanta, Georgia
Mar 8, 1987*; ABC	(1) No. 9	vs. (7) LSU; Championship game	W 69–62	26–4	The Omni; Atlanta, Georgia
NCAA Tournament
Mar 12, 1987*	(2 SE) No. 9	vs. (15 SE) North Carolina A&T; First round	W 88–71	27–4	Birmingham-Jefferson Civic Center; Birmingham, Alabama
Mar 14, 1987*	(2 SE) No. 9	vs. (7 SE) No. 16 New Orleans; Second round	W 101–76	28–4	Birmingham-Jefferson Civic Center; Birmingham, Alabama
Mar 19, 1987*	(2 SE) No. 9	vs. (6 SE) Providence; Southeast Regional Final – Sweet Sixteen	L 82–103	28–5	Freedom Hall; Louisville, Kentucky
*Non-conference game. ^{#}Rankings from AP poll. (#) Tournament seedings in parentheses.

== Awards and honors ==
- Derrick McKey – SEC Player of the Year
