= 1986–87 BYU Cougars men's basketball team =

American college basketball season

1986–87 BYU Cougars men's basketball

NCAA tournament, first round
- Conference: Western Athletic Conference
- Record: 21–11 (12–4 WAC)
- Head coach: LaDell Andersen (4th season)
- Home arena: Marriott Center

1986–87 WAC men's basketball standings
	Conf.				Overall
Team	W		L	PCT	W		L	PCT
UTEP	13	–	3	.813	25	–	7	.781
Brigham Young	12	–	4	.750	21	–	11	.656
New Mexico	11	–	5	.688	25	–	10	.714
Wyoming †	11	–	5	.688	24	–	10	.706
Utah	9	–	7	.563	17	–	13	.567
Colorado State	7	–	9	.438	13	–	16	.448
Air Force	5	–	11	.313	12	–	15	.444
Hawaii	2	–	14	.125	7	–	21	.250
San Diego State	2	–	14	.125	5	–	25	.167
† 1987 WAC tournament winner Rankings from AP Poll

The 1986–87 BYU Cougars men's basketball team represented Brigham Young University as a member of the Western Athletic Conference during the 1986–87 basketball season. Led by head coach LaDell Andersen, the Cougars compiled a record of 21–11 (12–4 WAC) to finish second in the WAC regular season standings. The team played their home games at the Marriott Center in Provo, Utah. The Cougars received an at-large bid to the NCAA tournament. In the opening round, BYU was defeated by New Orleans, 83–79.

== Roster ==
1986–87 BYU Cougars men's basketball team
Players
Coaches

Pos.	#	Name	Height	Weight	Year	Hometown
F	4	Michael Smith	6 ft 10 in (2.08 m)	220 lb (100 kg)	So	Hacienda Heights, California
G	13	Andy Toolson	6 ft 6 in (1.98 m)	205 lb (93 kg)	Fr	Twin Falls, Idaho
F	24	Jeff Chatman	6 ft 6 in (1.98 m)	—	Jr

Head coach

- LaDell Andersen

Assistant coach(es)

Legend

- (C) Team captain
- (S) Suspended
- (I) Ineligible
- (W) Walk-on
- Injured
- Current redshirt

== Schedule and results ==
Date time, TV	Rank^{#}	Opponent^{#}	Result	Record	Site city, state
Regular Season
Nov 21, 1986*		at No. 7 Oklahoma; Preseason NIT	L 110–119	0–1	Lloyd Noble Center; Norman, Oklahoma
Dec 3, 1986*		Utah State	W 100–86	1–1	Marriott Center; Provo, Utah
Dec 6, 1986*		at Notre Dame	L 46–62	1–2	Joyce Center; Notre Dame, Indiana
Jan 3, 1987		Wyoming	W 77–74	10–4	Marriott Center; Provo, Utah
Jan 6, 1987*		SW Missouri State	L 61–62	10–5	Marriott Center; Provo, Utah
Jan 9, 1987		at UTEP	W 73–66	11–5	Special Events Center; El Paso, Texas
WAC Tournament
Mar 6, 1987*		vs. Air Force; Quarterfinals	W 92–79 ^{OT}	21–9	The Pit; Albuquerque, New Mexico
Mar 7, 1987*		at New Mexico; Semifinals	L 86–93	21–10	The Pit; Albuquerque, New Mexico
NCAA Tournament
Mar 12, 1987*	(10 SE)	vs. (7 SE) No. 16 New Orleans; First round	L 79–83	21–11	Birmingham-Jefferson Civic Center; Birmingham, Alabama
*Non-conference game. ^{#}Rankings from AP Poll. (#) Tournament seedings in parentheses. SE=Southeast.
