= 1987 SEC men's basketball tournament =

American college basketball postseason tournament

- Classification: Division I
- Season: 1986–87
- Teams: 10
- Site: Omni Coliseum; Atlanta, Georgia
- Champions: Alabama Crimson Tide (3rd title)
- Winning coach: Wimp Sanderson (1st title)
- MVP: Derrick McKey (Alabama)
- Attendance: 105,616
- Television: Jefferson-Pilot Teleproductions (First two rounds and semifinals); ABC (Championship Game)

1986–87 Southeastern Conference men's basketball standings
	Conf.				Overall
Team	W		L	PCT	W		L	PCT
No. 9 Alabama †	16	–	2	.889	28	–	5	.848
Florida	12	–	6	.667	23	–	11	.676
Georgia	10	–	8	.556	18	–	12	.600
Kentucky	10	–	8	.556	18	–	11	.621
Auburn	9	–	9	.500	18	–	13	.581
Ole Miss	8	–	10	.444	15	–	14	.517
LSU	8	–	10	.444	24	–	15	.615
Tennessee	7	–	11	.389	14	–	15	.483
Vanderbilt	7	–	11	.389	18	–	16	.529
Mississippi State	3	–	15	.167	7	–	21	.250
† 1987 SEC tournament winner Rankings from AP Poll

The 1987 SEC Men’s Basketball Tournament took place from March 5–8, 1987 at the Omni Coliseum in Atlanta, Georgia. Alabama won the tournament and received the SEC's automatic bid to the NCAA Men’s Division I Basketball tournament by defeating Louisiana State (LSU) by a score of 69–62.

Jefferson-Pilot Teleproductions, in its first season of producing regionally syndicated SEC basketball games, provided television coverage of the first round, the quarterfinals, and the semifinals. Coverage of the championship game was broadcast on ABC through its sports broadcasting division, ABC Sports.

== Bracket ==
First Round; Thursday, March 5 Jefferson-Pilot Teleproductions
8	Tennessee	74
9	Vanderbilt	57
7	LSU	68
10	Mississippi State	54

Second Round; Friday, March 6 Jefferson-Pilot
1	#9 Alabama	68
8	Tennessee	60
4	Kentucky	72
5	Auburn	79
2	Florida	66
7	LSU	72
3	Georgia	65
6	Mississippi	63

Semi-Finals; Saturday, March 7 Jefferson-Pilot
5	Auburn	68
1	#9 Alabama	87
7	LSU	89^{2OT}
3	Georgia	88

Championship game Sunday, March 8 ABC
1	#9 Alabama	69
7	LSU	62
