= 1986–87 New Orleans Privateers men's basketball team =

American college basketball season

1986–87 New Orleans Privateers men's basketball

NCAA tournament, Second round
- Conference: Independent

Ranking
- Coaches: No. 19 т
- AP: No. 16
- Record: 26–4
- Head coach: Benny Dees (2nd season)
- Assistant coach: Billy Kennedy (1st season)
- Home arena: Lakefront Arena

1986–87 NCAA Division I men's basketball independents standings
	Conf.				Overall
Team	W		L	PCT	W		L	PCT
No. 5 DePaul	-	–	-	–	28	–	3	.903
No. 16 New Orleans	-	–	-	–	26	–	4	.867
No. 18 Notre Dame	-	–	-	–	24	–	8	.750
Texas–Pan American	-	–	-	–	16	–	12	.571
Tennessee State	-	–	-	–	15	–	12	.556
Marquette	-	–	-	–	16	–	13	.552
Miami (FL)	-	–	-	–	15	–	16	.484
Dayton	-	–	-	–	13	–	15	.464
Central Florida	-	–	-	–	12	–	15	.444
UMBC	-	–	-	–	12	–	15	.444
Chicago State	-	–	-	–	11	–	17	.393
Southwestern Louisiana	-	–	-	–	11	–	17	.393
U.S. International	-	–	-	–	11	–	17	.393
Utica	-	–	-	–	10	–	16	.385
Brooklyn	-	–	-	–	10	–	18	.357
Northern Illinois	-	–	-	–	9	–	19	.321
Central Connecticut State	-	–	-	–	8	–	21	.276
Eastern Washington	-	–	-	–	5	–	23	.179
Rankings from AP Poll

The 1986–87 New Orleans Privateers men's basketball team represented the University of New Orleans during the 1986–87 NCAA Division I men's basketball season. The Privateers led by third-year head coach Benny Dees, played their home games at Lakefront Arena and played as an NCAA Independent for the last season before being a member of the American South Conference during the 1987–88 season. They finished the season 26–4 and earned a bid to the NCAA tournament as the No. 7 seed in the Southeast region. The Privateers beat BYU in the opening round and lost to No. 2 seed Alabama in the round of 32, 101–76.

== Roster ==
1986–87 New Orleans Privateers men's basketball team
Players
Coaches

Pos.	#	Name	Height	Weight	Year	Previous school	Hometown
G	24	Ledell Eackles	6 ft 5 in (1.96 m)	210 lb (95 kg)	Jr	Broadmoor HS	Baton Rouge, Louisiana
F		Ronnie Grandison	6 ft 6 in (1.98 m)	210 lb (95 kg)	Sr	St. Bernard HS; UC Irvine	Los Angeles, California

Head coach

- Benny Dees (Wyoming)

Assistant coach(es)

- Billy Kennedy (Southeastern Louisiana)

Legend

- (C) Team captain
- (S) Suspended
- (I) Ineligible
- (W) Walk-on
- Injured
- Current redshirt

== Schedule and results ==
Date time, TV	Rank^{#}	Opponent^{#}	Result	Record	Site (attendance) city, state
Regular Season
Nov 29, 1986*		Southern California	W 85–67	1–0	Lakefront Arena (5,495); New Orleans, Louisiana
Dec 6, 1986*		vs. George Mason	L 67–70	1–1	
Dec 7, 1986*		vs. Southern Illinois	W 93–77	2–1	
Dec 13, 1986*		at Houston	L 75–83	2–2	Hofheinz Pavilion; Houston, Texas
Dec 15, 1986*		Mankato State	W 97–85	3–2	Lakefront Arena (2,702); New Orleans, Louisiana
Dec 19, 1986*		vs. Northwestern State	W 71–57	4–2	LSU Assembly Center; Baton Rouge, Louisiana
Dec 20, 1986*		at LSU	W 82–71	5–2	LSU Assembly Center; Baton Rouge, Louisiana
Jan 3, 1987*		Oklahoma State	W 77–68	6–2	Lakefront Arena; New Orleans, Louisiana
Feb 23, 1987*	No. 19	Southwestern Louisiana	W 89–63	23–3	Lakefront Arena; New Orleans, Louisiana
Feb 25, 1987*	No. 19	Northern Illinois	W 91–76	24–3	Lakefront Arena; New Orleans, Louisiana
Feb 28, 1987*	No. 19	at Lamar	W 81–65	25–3	Montagne Center; Beaumont, Texas
NCAA Tournament
Mar 12, 1987*	(7 SE) No. 16	vs. (10 SE) Brigham Young; First round	W 83–79	26–3	Birmingham-Jefferson Civic Center; Birmingham, Alabama
Mar 14, 1987*	(7 SE) No. 16	vs. (2 SE) No. 9 Alabama; Second round	L 76–101	26–4	Birmingham-Jefferson Civic Center; Birmingham, Alabama
*Non-conference game. ^{#}Rankings from AP Poll. (#) Tournament seedings in parentheses. All times are in Central Time.
