= 1986–87 NC State Wolfpack men's basketball team =

American college basketball season

1986–87 NC State Wolfpack men's basketball

ACC tournament champions

NCAA tournament, Round of 64
- Conference: Atlantic Coast Conference
- Record: 20–15 (6–8 ACC)
- Head coach: Jim Valvano (7th season)
- Assistant coaches: Ray Martin (7th season); Ed McLean (5th season); Dick Stewart
- Home arena: Reynolds Coliseum

1986–87 ACC men's basketball standings
	Conf.				Overall
Team	W		L	PCT	W		L	PCT
No. 2 North Carolina	14	–	0	1.000	32	–	4	.889
No. 13 Clemson	10	–	4	.714	25	–	6	.806
No. 17 Duke	9	–	5	.643	24	–	9	.727
Virginia	8	–	6	.571	21	–	10	.677
Georgia Tech	7	–	7	.500	16	–	13	.552
NC State †	6	–	8	.429	20	–	14	.588
Wake Forest	2	–	12	.143	14	–	15	.483
Maryland	0	–	14	.000	9	–	17	.346
† 1987 ACC tournament winner Rankings from AP Poll

The 1986–87 NC State Wolfpack men's basketball team represented North Carolina State University during the 1986–87 men's college basketball season. It was Jim Valvano's seventh season as head coach.

== Roster ==
1986–87 NC State Wolfpack men's basketball team
Players
Coaches

Pos.	#	Name	Height	Weight	Year	Hometown
G	11	Kelsey Weems	6 ft 2 in (1.88 m)	180 lb (82 kg)	So	Atlanta, Georgia
G	14	Vinny Del Negro	6 ft 4 in (1.93 m)	180 lb (82 kg)	Jr	Springfield, Massachusetts
G	21	Andy Kennedy	6 ft 7 in (2.01 m)	190 lb (86 kg)	Fr	Louisville, Mississippi
F	22	Brian Howard	6 ft 6 in (1.98 m)	205 lb (93 kg)	Fr	Winston-Salem, North Carolina
F	23	Bennie Bolton	6 ft 8 in (2.03 m)	220 lb (100 kg)	Sr	Washington, District of Columbia
F	30	Kenny Poston	6 ft 6 in (1.98 m)	219 lb (99 kg)	So	Cherryville, North Carolina
F	32	Avie Lester	6 ft 9 in (2.06 m)	215 lb (98 kg)	Fr	Roxboro, North Carolina
C	33	Charles Shackleford	6 ft 10 in (2.08 m)	220 lb (100 kg)	Jr	Kinston, North Carolina
F	34	Walker Lambiotte	6 ft 7 in (2.01 m)	207 lb (94 kg)	So	Woodstock, Virginia
G	35	Quentin Jackson	6 ft 0 in (1.83 m)	187 lb (85 kg)	Jr	Annapolis, Maryland
F	52	Chucky Brown	6 ft 7 in (2.01 m)	210 lb (95 kg)	So	New York, New York

Head coach

- Jim Valvano (Rutgers)

Assistant coach(es)

- Ray Marti (Notre Dame)
- Ed McLean (Western Carolina)
- Dick Stewart (Rutgers)

Legend

- (C) Team captain
- (S) Suspended
- (I) Ineligible
- (W) Walk-on
- Injured
- Current redshirt

Roster

== Schedule ==
Date time, TV	Rank^{#}	Opponent^{#}	Result	Record	Site city, state
November 22*	No. 17	vs. No. 9 Navy; Hall of Fame Tip-off Classic	W 86–84	1–0	Springfield Civic Center; Springfield, MA
November 28*	No. 17	vs. Texas; Great Alaska Shootout	W 69-68	2–0	Sullivan Arena; Anchorage, AK
November 29*	No. 17	vs. No. 10 Iowa; Great Alaska Shootout	L 89-90 ^{OT}	2–1	Sullivan Arena (3,780); Anchorage, AK
November 30*	No. 17	vs. Utah State; Great Alaska Shootout	W 94-82	3–1	Sullivan Arena; Anchorage, AK
December 3*	No. 18	East Tennessee State	W 104–85	4–1	Reynolds Coliseum; Raleigh, NC
December 6*	No. 18	at Western Carolina	W 96-75	5–1	Ramsey Center; Cullowhee, NC
December 13*	No. 15	Duquesne	W 82-59	6–1	Reynolds Coliseum; Raleigh, NC
December 17*	No. 12	UNC-Asheville	W 81-65	7–1	Reynolds Coliseum; Raleigh, NC
December 27*	No. 11	at Tampa	L 62-67	7–2	Martinez Center; Tampa, FL
December 30*	No. 19	Loyola (Chicago)	W 97-85	8–2	Reynolds Coliseum; Raleigh, NC
January 3	No. 19	Maryland	W 69-47	9–2 (1–0)	Reynolds Coliseum; Raleigh, NC
January 7	No. 18	at No. 20 Clemson	L 69-73	9–3 (1–1)	Littlejohn Coliseum; Clemson, SC
January 10	No. 18	Georgia Tech	W 63-62	10–3 (2–1)	Reynolds Coliseum; Raleigh, NC
January 15	No. 17	Wake Forest	W 75-67	11–3 (3–1)	Reynolds Coliseum; Raleigh, NC
January 18	No. 17	at No. 3 North Carolina	L 78-96	11–4 (4–1)	Dean Smith Center; Chapel Hill, NC
January 21	No. 20	No. 12 Duke	W 87-74	12–4 (4–2)	Reynolds Coliseum; Raleigh, NC
January 25*	No. 20	vs. Kansas	L 60-74	12–5	Kemper Arena; Kansas City, KS
January 28		Virginia	L 60-61	12–6 (4–3)	University Hall; Charlottesville, VA
January 31*		Oklahoma	L 82-86	12–7	Reynolds Coliseum; Raleigh, NC
February 2*		at No. 5 DePaul	L 62-84	12–8	Rosemont Horizon; Rosemont, IL
February 5		No. 3 North Carolina	L 79-95	12–9 (4–4)	Reynolds Coliseum; Raleigh, NC
February 7*		Louisville	L 75-87	12–10	Freedom Hall; Louisville, KY
February 9*		Winthrop	W 85-58	13–10	Reynolds Coliseum; Raleigh, NC
February 11		Clemson	L 75-78	13–11 (4–5)	Reynolds Coliseum; Raleigh, NC
February 14		at Georgia Tech	L 76-87	13–12 (4–6)	Alexander Memorial Coliseum; Atlanta, GA
February 16*		Brooklyn College	W 107-79	14–12	Reynolds Coliseum; Raleigh, NC
February 19		at No. 17 Duke	L 50-65	14–13 (4–7)	Cameron Indoor Stadium; Durham, NC
February 22		Virginia	L 65-72	14–14 (4–8)	Reynolds Coliseum; Raleigh, NC
February 25		Maryland	W 85-72	15–14 (5–8)	Cole Field House; College Park, MD
February 28		Wake Forest	W 80-76 ^{OT}	16–14 (6–8)	Winston-Salem Memorial Coliseum; Winston-Salem, NC
March 2*		Chicago State	W 86-78	17–14	Reynolds Coliseum; Raleigh, NC
ACC Tournament
March 6*		vs. No. 14 Duke; ACC tournament Quarterfinal	W 71–64 ^{OT}	18–14	Capital Centre; Landover, MD
March 7*		vs. Wake Forest; ACC Tournament Semifinal	W 77–73 ^{2OT}	19–14	Capital Centre; Landover, MD
March 8*		vs. No. 2 North Carolina; ACC tournament championship Game	W 68–67	20–14	Capital Centre; Landover, MD
NCAA Tournament
March 13*; ESPN/NCAAP	(11 E)	vs. (6 E) Florida; NCAA tournament first round	L 70-82	20–15	Carrier Dome; Syracuse, NY
*Non-conference game. ^{#}Rankings from AP Poll. (#) Tournament seedings in parentheses. E=East.

== Rankings ==
Ranking movements Legend: ██ Increase in ranking ██ Decrease in ranking — = Not ranked
	Week																	
Poll	Pre	1	2	3	4	5	6	7	8	9	10	11	12	13	14	15	16	Final
AP	17	18	15	12	11	19	18	17	20	—	—	—	—	—	—	—	—	—
Coaches	Not released	19	18	15	13	—	20	17	—	—	—	—	—	—	—	—	—	—
