= 1986–87 Arizona Wildcats men's basketball team =

American college basketball season

1986–87 Arizona Wildcats men's basketball

Fiesta Bowl Classic Champions

NCAA tournament, first round
- Conference: Pacific-10
- Record: 18–12 (13–5 Pac-10)
- Head coach: Lute Olson (4th season)
- Assistant coaches: Tom Billeter (2nd season); Ricky Byrdsong (5th season); Kevin O'Neill (1st season); Scott Thompson (4th season)
- Home arena: McKale Center (Capacity: 14,545)

1986–87 Pacific-10 Conference men's basketball standings
	Conf.				Overall
Team	W		L	PCT	W		L	PCT
No. 15 UCLA †	14	–	4	.778	25	–	7	.781
Arizona	13	–	5	.722	18	–	12	.600
Washington	10	–	8	.556	20	–	15	.571
California	10	–	8	.556	20	–	15	.571
Oregon State	10	–	8	.556	19	–	11	.633
Stanford	9	–	9	.500	15	–	13	.536
Oregon	8	–	10	.444	16	–	14	.533
Arizona State	6	–	12	.333	11	–	17	.393
Washington State	6	–	12	.333	10	–	18	.357
USC	4	–	14	.222	9	–	19	.321
† 1987 Pacific-10 Tournament winner As of March 25, 1987; Rankings from AP poll

The 1986–87 Arizona Wildcats men's basketball team represented the University of Arizona during the 1986–87 NCAA Division I men's basketball season. The head coach was Lute Olson. The team played its home games in the McKale Center in Tucson, Arizona, and was a member of the Pacific-10 Conference. The Wildcats finished with an overall record of 18–12 (13–5 Pac-10) and reached the NCAA tournament, but lost in the opening round for the third consecutive year.

== Roster ==
1986–87 Arizona Wildcats men's basketball team
Players
Coaches

Pos.	#	Name	Height	Weight	Year	Previous school	Hometown
F	00	Anthony Cook	—	—	So	Van Nuys HS	Los Angeles, CA
PG	11	Kenny Lofton	6 ft 0 in (1.83 m)	180 lb (82 kg)	So	Washington HS	East Chicago, IN
G	13	Rolf Jacobs	6 ft 7 in (2.01 m)	—	Jr	Fountain Valley HS	Fountain Valley, CA
G	20	Craig McMillan	6 ft 6 in (1.98 m)	—	Jr	Cloverdale HS	Cloverdale, CA
G	21	Eric Cooper	6 ft 4 in (1.93 m)	—	So	Banning HS	Los Angeles, CA
G	22	Bruce Fraser	6 ft 5 in (1.96 m)	172 lb (78 kg)	Sr	Long Beach City College	Long Beach, CA
C	23	Tom Tolbert	6 ft 7 in (2.01 m)	225 lb (102 kg)	Jr	Cerritos College
G	25	Steve Kerr (injured) (redshirt)	6 ft 3 in (1.91 m)	175 lb (79 kg)	Sr	Palisades Charter HS	Los Angeles, CA
SF	32	Sean Elliott	6 ft 8 in (2.03 m)	210 lb (95 kg)	So	Cholla HS	Tucson, AZ
F	33	Joe Turner	6 ft 9 in (2.06 m)	—	Jr	Foothill HS	Bakersfield, CA
C	34	Brian David	6 ft 9 in (2.06 m)	—	So	Kuemper HS	Templeton, IA
SF	35	Jud Buechler	6 ft 6 in (1.98 m)	210 lb (95 kg)	Fr	Poway HS	Poway CA
G	44	Harvey Mason	6 ft 3 in (1.91 m)	—	Fr	Crescenta HS	La Crescenta, CA
C	45	Bruce Wheatley	6 ft 8 in (2.03 m)	—	So	Nogales HS	Los Angeles, CA

Head coach

- Lute Olson (Augsburg)

Assistant coach(es)

- Tom Billeter
- Ricky Byrdsong
- Kevin O'Neill
- Scott Thompson

Legend

- (C) Team captain
- (S) Suspended
- (I) Ineligible
- (W) Walk-on
- Injured
- Current redshirt

== Schedule and results ==
Date time, TV	Rank^{#}	Opponent^{#}	Result	Record	Site (attendance) city, state
Non-conference regular season
Nov 21, 1986*	No. 19	at No. 5 UNLV; Preseason NIT	L 87–92	0–1	Thomas & Mack Center; Las Vegas, NV
Dec 4, 1986*	No. 20	at San Diego State	W 110–78	1–1	Peterson Gym; San Diego, CA
Dec 6, 1986*	No. 20	Utah	L 67–68	1–2	McKale Center; Tucson, AZ
Dec 8, 1986*	No. 20	at Northern Arizona	W 76–69	2–2	Walkup Skydome; Flagstaff, AZ
Dec 10, 1986*		Hawaii Pacific	W 105–85	3–2	McKale Center; Tucson, AZ
Dec 13, 1986*		at No. 13 Georgetown	L 74–82	3–3	Capital Centre; Landover, MD
Dec 27, 1986*		St. Bonaventure; Fiesta Bowl Classic	W 70–64	4–3	McKale Center; Tucson, AZ
Dec 28, 1986*		Texas Tech; Fiesta Bowl Classic	W 53–40	5–3	McKale Center; Tucson, AZ
Pac-10 regular season
Jan 2, 1987		at Oregon State	W 54–48	6–3 (1–0)	Gill Coliseum; Corvallis, OR
Jan 4, 1987		at Oregon	L 54–55 ^{OT}	6–4 (1–1)	McArthur Court; Eugene, OR
Jan 8, 1987		USC	W 78–44	7–4 (2–1)	McKale Center; Tucson, AZ
Jan 10, 1987		UCLA; Rivalry	L 83–84	7–5 (2–2)	McKale Center; Tucson, AZ
Jan 15, 1987		at Washington State	W 96–59	8–5 (3–2)	Friel Court; Pullman, WA
Jan 17, 1987		at Washington	W 73–72	9–5 (4–2)	Hec Edmundson Pavilion; Seattle, WA
Jan 19, 1987		Stanford	W 77–70	10–5 (5–2)	McKale Center; Tucson, AZ
Jan 22, 1987		California	L 81–82 ^{2OT}	10–6 (5–3)	McKale Center; Tucson, AZ
Jan 24, 1987*		at No. 9 Illinois	L 63–67	10–7	Assembly Hall; Champaign, IL
Jan 29, 1987		at Arizona State; Rivalry	W 82–67	11–7 (6–3)	ASU Activity Center; Tempe, AZ
Feb 3, 1987		Arizona State; Rivalry	W 66–54	12–7 (7–3)	McKale Center; Tucson, AZ
Feb 5, 1987		Oregon	W 68–53	13–7 (8–3)	McKale Center; Tucson, AZ
Feb 7, 1987*		No. 4 Iowa	L 80–89	13–8	McKale Center; Tucson, AZ
Feb 12, 1987		at UCLA; Rivalry	L 65–81	13–9 (8–4)	Pauley Pavilion; Los Angeles, CA
Feb 14, 1987		Oregon State	W 71–61	14–9 (9–4)	McKale Center; Tucson, AZ
Feb 17, 1987		at USC	W 73–61	15–9 (10–4)	L.A. Sports Arena; Los Angeles, CA
Feb 19, 1987		Washington State	W 84–58	16–9 (11–4)	McKale Center; Tucson, AZ
Feb 21, 1987		Washington	W 81–70	17–9 (12–4)	McKale Center; Tucson, AZ
Feb 26, 1987		at Stanford	L 73–75	17–10 (12–5)	Maples Pavilion; Stanford, CA
Mar 1, 1987		at California	W 70–51	18–10 (13–5)	Harmon Gym; Berkeley, CA
Pac-10 Tournament
Mar 6, 1987*	(2)	vs. (7) Oregon; Pac-10 Tournament Quarterfinal	L 63–72	18–11	Pauley Pavilion; Los Angeles, CA
NCAA Tournament
Mar 13, 1987*	(10 W)	vs. (7 W) UTEP; First round	L 91–98 ^{OT}	18–12	McKale Center; Tucson, AZ
*Non-conference game. ^{#}Rankings from AP Poll. (#) Tournament seedings in parentheses.
