= Jim Brandenburg (basketball) =

American basketball coach (1935–2023)

Biographical details
- Born: December 10, 1935
- Died: June 18, 2023 (aged 87)

Playing career
- 1953–1958: Colorado State

Coaching career (HC unless noted)
- 1958–1963: Burbank HS (TX)
- 1963–1969: Hinkley HS (CO)
- 1969–1970: Flathead Valley CC
- 1970–1976: Montana (assistant)
- 1976–1978: Montana
- 1978–1987: Wyoming
- 1987–1992: San Diego State

Head coaching record
- Overall: 254–213 (.544) (college)
- Tournaments: 4–3 (NCAA Division I); 4–1 (NIT)

Accomplishments and honors

Championships
- Big Sky regular season (1978); 3 WAC regular season (1981, 1982, 1986); WAC tournament (1987)

Awards
- Big Sky Coach of the Year (1978); 3x WAC Coach of the Year (1981, 1982, 1986)

Jimmy Ray Brandenburg (December 10, 1935 – June 18, 2023) was an American college basketball coach. As the head coach at the University of Montana (1976–1978), the University of Wyoming (1978–1987), and San Diego State University (1987–1992), he compiled a career record of 254–213 (.544).

Brandenburg was the third winningest coach in the history of Wyoming Cowboys basketball and was inducted into the Wyoming Athletics Hall of Fame in September 2000. He joined the San Diego State Aztecs in 1987, replacing Smokey Gaines after a 5–25 season. Brandenburg was fired in his fifth season, compiling a 52–87 record without a winning season for the Aztecs.

Brandenburg died on June 18, 2023, at the age of 87.

== Head coaching record ==
Record table
Season	Team	Overall	Conference	Standing	Postseason
Montana Grizzlies (Big Sky Conference) (1976–1978)
1976–77	Montana	7–19	5–9	T–4th	
1977–78	Montana	20–9	12–2	1st	
Montana:		27–28 (.491)	17–11 (.607)		
Wyoming Cowboys (Western Athletic Conference) (1978–1987)
1978–79	Wyoming	15–12	5–7	4th	
1979–80	Wyoming	18–10	8–6	4th	
1980–81	Wyoming	24–6	13–3	T–1st	NCAA Division I second round
1981–82	Wyoming	23–7	14–2	1st	NCAA Division I second round
1982–83	Wyoming	16–13	8–8	6th	
1983–84	Wyoming	17–13	9–7	4th	
1984–85	Wyoming	15–14	7–9	7th	
1985–86	Wyoming	24–12	12–4	T–1st	NIT Runner-up
1986–87	Wyoming	24–10	11–5	4th	NCAA Division I Sweet 16
Wyoming:		176–97 (.645)	87–51 (.630)		
San Diego State Aztecs (Western Athletic Conference) (1987–1992)
1987–88	San Diego State	12–17	5–11	7th	
1988–89	San Diego State	12–17	4–12	9th	
1989–90	San Diego State	13–18	4–12	8th	
1990–91	San Diego State	13–16	6–10	T–7th	
1991–92	San Diego State	2–19	0–9	9th	
San Diego State:		52–87 (.374)	19–54 (.260)		
Total:		254–213 (.544)			
National champion Postseason invitational champion Conference regular season champion Conference regular season and conference tournament champion Division regular season champion Division regular season and conference tournament champion Conference tournament champion

== Award and honors ==
- Inducted into the University of Wyoming Athletics Hall of Fame in 2000.
- Three time Western Athletic Conference coach of the year (1980–81, 1981–82, 1985–86).
- Eastman Kodak NCAA Division I District 13 Coach of the year in 1986.
