= 1986–87 Georgia Bulldogs basketball team =

American college basketball season

1986–87 Georgia Bulldogs basketball

NCAA tournament, Round of 64
- Conference: Southeastern Conference
- Record: 18–12 (10–8 SEC)
- Head coach: Hugh Durham (9th season)
- Assistant coaches: Don Beasley; Larry Gay; Joe Cunningham
- Home arena: Stegeman Coliseum

1986–87 Southeastern Conference men's basketball standings
	Conf.				Overall
Team	W		L	PCT	W		L	PCT
No. 9 Alabama †	16	–	2	.889	28	–	5	.848
Florida	12	–	6	.667	23	–	11	.676
Georgia	10	–	8	.556	18	–	12	.600
Kentucky	10	–	8	.556	18	–	11	.621
Auburn	9	–	9	.500	18	–	13	.581
Ole Miss	8	–	10	.444	15	–	14	.517
LSU	8	–	10	.444	24	–	15	.615
Tennessee	7	–	11	.389	14	–	15	.483
Vanderbilt	7	–	11	.389	18	–	16	.529
Mississippi State	3	–	15	.167	7	–	21	.250
† 1987 SEC tournament winner Rankings from AP Poll

The 1986–87 Georgia Bulldogs basketball team represented the University of Georgia as a member of the Southeastern Conference during the 1986–87 NCAA men's basketball season. The team was led by head coach Hugh Durham, and played their home games at Stegeman Coliseum in Athens, Georgia. The Bulldogs finished third in the SEC regular season standings, and received an at-large bid to the NCAA tournament as No. 8 seed in the West region. They were defeated by No. 9 seed Kansas State, 82–79 in OT, in the opening round to finish the season at 18–12 (10–8 SEC).

== Roster ==
1986–87 Georgia Bulldogs men's basketball team
Players	Coaches
Pos. / # / Name / Height / Weight / Year / Hometown; C / 33 / Alec Kessler / 6 ft 11 in (2.11 m) / 220 lb (100 kg) / Fr / Roswell, Georgia	Head coach: Hugh Durham (Florida State); Assistant coach(es): Don Beasley (Northwestern State); Larry Gay (Florida State); Joe Cunningham; Legend: (C) Team captain; (S) Suspended; (I) Ineligible; (W) Walk-on; Injured; Current redshirt

== Schedule and results ==
Date time, TV	Rank^{#}	Opponent^{#}	Result	Record	Site city, state
Non-conference Regular season
Nov 28, 1986*		Seattle	W 103–58	1–0	Stegeman Coliseum; Athens, Georgia
Nov 30, 1986*		Armstrong State	W 79–62	2–0	Stegeman Coliseum; Athens, Georgia
Dec 3, 1986*		at No. 15 Georgia Tech; Cotton States Classic	L 66–72	2–1	Alexander Memorial Coliseum; Atlanta, Georgia
Dec 6, 1986*		Central Florida	W 91–68	3–1	Stegeman Coliseum; Athens, Georgia
Dec 13, 1986*		vs. Loyola–Chicago	W 81–69	4–1	Atlanta, Georgia
Dec 14, 1986*		vs. Memphis State	L 71–82	4–2	Atlanta, Georgia
Dec 19, 1986*		vs. La Salle; Hawaiian Tropic Classic	W 82–65	5–2	Daytona Beach, Florida
Dec 20, 1986*		vs. Stetson; Hawaiian Tropic Classic	W 94–83	6–2	Daytona Beach, Florida
SEC Regular season
Dec 22, 1986		Alabama	L 70–71	6–3 (0–1)	Stegeman Coliseum; Athens, Georgia
Dec 27, 1986*		Columbus	W 108–75	7–3	Stegeman Coliseum; Athens, Georgia
Dec 30, 1986		vs. No. 11 Kentucky	W 69–65	8–3 (1–1)	Freedom Hall; Louisville, Kentucky
Jan 3, 1987; 3:00 p.m., JPT		Florida	L 80–87	8–4 (1–2)	Stegeman Coliseum; Athens, Georgia
Jan 7, 1987		at No. 13 Auburn	L 58–62	8–5 (1–3)	Beard-Eaves-Memorial Coliseum; Auburn, Alabama
Jan 10, 1987		at LSU	W 64–63	9–5 (2–3)	LSU Assembly Center; Baton Rouge, Louisiana
Jan 14, 1987; 8:00 p.m., JPT		Vanderbilt	W 76–53	10–5 (3–3)	Stegeman Coliseum; Athens, Georgia
Jan 17, 1987		Mississippi State	W 48–41	11–5 (4–3)	Stegeman Coliseum; Athens, Georgia
Jan 21, 1987		at Ole Miss	L 68–80	11–6 (4–4)	Tad Smith Coliseum; Oxford, Mississippi
Jan 28, 1987*		Tennessee	W 60–55	12–6 (5–4)	Stegeman Coliseum; Athens, Georgia
Jan 31, 1987		at No. 9 Alabama	L 74–83	12–7 (5–5)	Coleman Coliseum; Tuscaloosa, Alabama
Feb 4, 1987		at Florida	L 52–66	12–8 (5–6)	Stephen C. O'Connell Center; Gainesville, Florida
Feb 7, 1987		No. 20 Auburn	W 75–71	13–8 (6–6)	Stegeman Coliseum; Athens, Georgia
Feb 11, 1987*; 8:00 p.m., JPT		LSU	W 63–57	14–8 (7–6)	Stegeman Coliseum; Athens, Georgia
Feb 14, 1987		at Vanderbilt	W 75–59	15–8 (8–6)	Memorial Gymnasium; Nashville, Tennessee
Feb 18, 1987		at Mississippi State	L 63–64	15–9 (8–7)	Humphrey Coliseum; Starkville, Mississippi
Feb 21, 1987		Ole Miss	W 69–65	16–9 (9–7)	Stegeman Coliseum; Athens, Georgia
Feb 25, 1987; 8:00 p.m., JPT		Kentucky	W 79–71	17–9 (10–7)	Stegeman Coliseum; Athens, Georgia
Feb 28, 1987; 3:00 p.m., JPT		at Tennessee	L 68–89	17–10 (10–8)	Stokely Athletic Center; Knoxville, Tennessee
SEC Tournament
Mar 6, 1987*; JPT		vs. Ole Miss; Quarterfinals	W 65–63	18–10	The Omni; Atlanta, Georgia
Mar 7, 1987*; JPT		vs. LSU; Semifinals	L 88–89 ^{2OT}	18–11	The Omni; Atlanta, Georgia
NCAA Tournament
Mar 12, 1987*	(8 W)	vs. (9 W) Kansas State; First round	L 79–82 ^{OT}	18–12	Jon M. Huntsman Center; Salt Lake City, Utah
*Non-conference game. ^{#}Rankings from AP Poll. (#) Tournament seedings in parentheses. W=West. All times are in Eastern Time.
