= 1986–87 UCLA Bruins men's basketball team =

American college basketball season

1986–87 UCLA Bruins men's basketball

Pac-10 tournament champions Pac-10 regular season champions

NCAA tournament, Round of 32
- Conference: Pacific-10

Ranking
- Coaches: No. 13
- AP: No. 15
- Record: 25–7 (14–4 Pac-10)
- Head coach: Walt Hazzard
- Assistant coaches: Sidney Wicks; Jack Hirsch; Andre McCarter
- Home arena: Pauley Pavilion

1986–87 Pacific-10 Conference men's basketball standings
	Conf.				Overall
Team	W		L	PCT	W		L	PCT
No. 15 UCLA †	14	–	4	.778	25	–	7	.781
Arizona	13	–	5	.722	18	–	12	.600
Washington	10	–	8	.556	20	–	15	.571
California	10	–	8	.556	20	–	15	.571
Oregon State	10	–	8	.556	19	–	11	.633
Stanford	9	–	9	.500	15	–	13	.536
Oregon	8	–	10	.444	16	–	14	.533
Arizona State	6	–	12	.333	11	–	17	.393
Washington State	6	–	12	.333	10	–	18	.357
USC	4	–	14	.222	9	–	19	.321
† 1987 Pacific-10 Tournament winner As of March 25, 1987; Rankings from AP poll

The 1986–87 UCLA Bruins men's basketball team represented the University of California, Los Angeles in the 1986–87 NCAA Division I men's basketball season. The team finished 1st in the conference, and also won the 1987 Pacific-10 Conference tournament. The Bruins competed in the 1987 NCAA Division I men's basketball tournament, losing to the Wyoming Cowboys in the round of 32.

== Starting lineup ==
Position	Player	Class
F	Reggie Miller	Sr.
F	Charles Rochelin	So.
C	Jack Haley	Sr.
G	Dave Immel	Jr.
G	Pooh Richardson	So.

== Roster ==
1986–87 UCLA Bruins men's basketball team
Players
Coaches

Pos.	#	Name	Height	Weight	Year	Hometown
F	42	Kelvin Butler	6 ft 7 in (2.01 m)	—	Jr
C	32	Greg Foster	6 ft 10 in (2.08 m)	—	Fr	Oakland, California
C	15	Jack Haley	6 ft 10 in (2.08 m)	—	Sr	Long Beach, California
F	15	Ike Hamilton	6 ft 9 in (2.06 m)	—	Sr
G	12	Montel Hatcher	6 ft 1 in (1.85 m)	—	Sr
G	30	Dave Immel	6 ft 4 in (1.93 m)	—	Jr
F	52	Craig Jackson	6 ft 8 in (2.03 m)	—	Jr
F	31	Reggie Miller (C)	6 ft 7 in (2.01 m)	—	Sr	Riverside, California
G	21	Rodney Palmer	6 ft 3 in (1.91 m)	—	So
G	24	Pooh Richardson	6 ft 1 in (1.85 m)	—	So	Philadelphia, Pennsylvania
F	45	Charles Rochelin	6 ft 7 in (2.01 m)	—	So
F	50	Kevin Walker	6 ft 10 in (2.08 m)	—	Fr
F	4	Trevor Wilson	6 ft 8 in (2.03 m)	—	Fr	Los Angeles, California

Head coach

Walt Hazzard (UCLA)

Assistant coach(es)

- Sidney Wicks (UCLA)
- Jack Hirsch (UCLA)
- Andre McCarter (UCLA)

Legend

- (C) Team captain
- (S) Suspended
- (I) Ineligible
- (W) Walk-on
- Injured
- Current redshirt

Roster
Last update: 30 January 2018

== Schedule ==
Date time, TV	Rank^{#}	Opponent^{#}	Result	Record	Site city, state
Regular Season
November 29, 1986		vs. Santa Clara	W 76–62	1–0	Pauley Pavilion (9,762); Los Angeles, CA
December 1, 1986		vs. No. 1 North Carolina	W 89–84	2–0	Pauley Pavilion (12,594); Los Angeles, CA
December 6, 1986	No. 11	Pepperdine	W 95–63	3–0	Pauley Pavilion (11,102); Los Angeles, CA
December 13, 1986	No. 11	at St. John's	L 63–70	3–1	Madison Square Garden (11,839); New York, NY
December 15, 1986	No. 11	at Temple	L 65–76	3–2	McGonigle Hall (4,500); Philadelphia, PA
December 19, 1986	No. 17	at Washington State	L 73–81	3–3 (0–1)	Beasley Coliseum (3,500); Pullman, WA
December 21, 1986	No. 17	at Washington	L 80–90	3–4 (0–2)	Hec Edmundson Pavilion (5,474); Seattle, WA
December 27, 1986		vs. Long Beach State	W 67–65	4–4	Pauley Pavilion (7,658); Los Angeles, CA
December 29, 1986		vs. Cal State Fullerton	W 72–71	5–4	Pauley Pavilion (12,352); Los Angeles, CA
January 2, 1987		Stanford	W 95–75	6–4 (1–2)	Pauley Pavilion (8,203); Los Angeles, CA
January 4, 1987		California	W 86–81	7–4 (2–2)	Pauley Pavilion (12,198); Los Angeles, CA
January 8, 1987		at Arizona State	W 61–51	8–4 (3–2)	ASU Activity Center (6,673); Tempe, AZ
January 11, 1987		at Arizona	W 84–83	9–4 (4–2)	McKale Center (13,024); Tucson, AZ
January 15, 1987		Oregon	W 64–59	10–4 (5–2)	Pauley Pavilion (9,076); Los Angeles, CA
January 18, 1987		Oregon State	W 69–67 ^{OT}	11–4 (6–2)	Pauley Pavilion (11,106); Los Angeles, CA
January 24, 1987		vs. Notre Dame	W 63–59	12–4	Pauley Pavilion (12,552); Los Angeles, CA
January 29, 1987		Washington	L 87–95	12–5 (6–3)	Pauley Pavilion (10,834); Los Angeles, CA
February 1, 1987		Washington State	W 61–60	13–5 (7–3)	Pauley Pavilion (8,172); Los Angeles, CA
February 5, 1987		at Stanford	W 93–62	14–5 (8–3)	Maples Pavilion (7,102); Stanford, CA
February 7, 1987		at California	W 77–72	15–5 (9–3)	Haas Pavilion (6,450); Berkeley, CA
February 12, 1987		Arizona	W 81–65	16–5 (10–3)	Pauley Pavilion (11,864); Los Angeles, CA
February 14, 1987		at USC	W 77–65	17–5 (11–3)	Los Angeles Memorial Sports Arena (7,145); Los Angeles, CA
February 16, 1987		Arizona State	L 64–67	17–6 (11–4)	Pauley Pavilion (7,681); Los Angeles, CA
February 19, 1987		at Oregon State	W 57–53	18–6 (12–4)	Gill Coliseum (10,400); Corvallis, OR
February 22, 1987		at Oregon	W 102–71	19–6 (13–4)	McArthur Court (10,003); Eugene, OR
February 26, 1987		USC	W 82–76	20–6 (14–4)	Pauley Pavilion (12,621); Los Angeles, CA
February 28, 1987		vs. Louisville	W 99–86	21–6	Pauley Pavilion (11,578); Los Angeles, CA
Pac-10 Tournament
March 6, 1987	(1) No. 18	vs. (8) Arizona State; Quarterfinals	W 99–83	22–6	Pauley Pavilion (8,918); Los Angeles, CA
March 7, 1987	(1) No. 18	vs. (4) California; Semifinals	W 75–68	23–6	Pauley Pavilion (9,352); Los Angeles, CA
March 8, 1987	(1) No. 18	vs. (3) Washington; Finals	W 76–64	24–6	Pauley Pavilion (9,117); Los Angeles, CA
NCAA Tournament
March 12, 1987	(4 W) No. 15	vs. (13 W) Central Michigan; First Round	W 92–73	25–6	Special Events Center (12,731); Salt Lake City, UT
March 14, 1987	(4 W) No. 15	vs. (12 W) Wyoming; Second Round	L 68–78	25–7	Special Events Center (14,944); Salt Lake City, UT
*Non-conference game. ^{#}Rankings from AP Poll. (#) Tournament seedings in parentheses. All times are in Pacific Time.

== Team players drafted into the NBA ==
Round	Pick	Player	NBA Team
1	11	Reggie Miller	Indiana Pacers
4	79	Jack Haley	Chicago Bulls
7	149	Montel Hatcher	Indiana Pacers
