= 1986–87 Kentucky Wildcats men's basketball team =

1986–87 season of University of Kentucky men's basketball team

1986–87 Kentucky Wildcats men's basketball
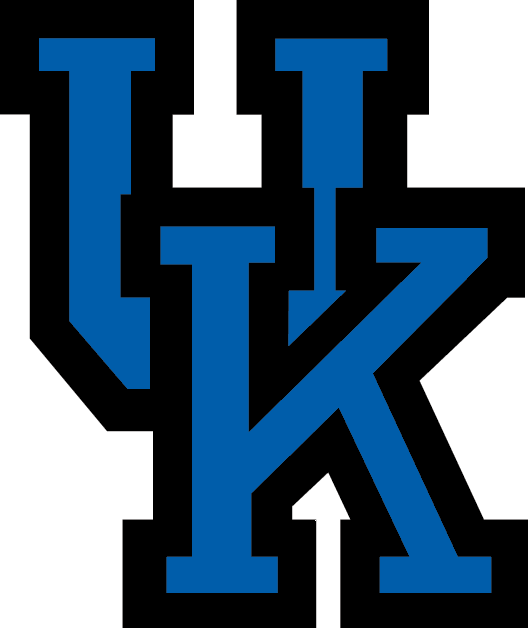

NCAA tournament, Round of 64
- Conference: Southeastern Conference
- Record: 18–11 (10–8 SEC)
- Head coach: Eddie Sutton (2nd season)
- Home arena: Rupp Arena

1986–87 Southeastern Conference men's basketball standings
	Conf.				Overall
Team	W		L	PCT	W		L	PCT
No. 9 Alabama †	16	–	2	.889	28	–	5	.848
Florida	12	–	6	.667	23	–	11	.676
Georgia	10	–	8	.556	18	–	12	.600
Kentucky	10	–	8	.556	18	–	11	.621
Auburn	9	–	9	.500	18	–	13	.581
Ole Miss	8	–	10	.444	15	–	14	.517
LSU	8	–	10	.444	24	–	15	.615
Tennessee	7	–	11	.389	14	–	15	.483
Vanderbilt	7	–	11	.389	18	–	16	.529
Mississippi State	3	–	15	.167	7	–	21	.250
† 1987 SEC tournament winner Rankings from AP Poll

The 1986–87 Kentucky Wildcats men's basketball team represented University of Kentucky in the 1986–87 NCAA Division I men's basketball season. The head coach was Eddie Sutton and the team finished the season with an overall record of 18–11. In the 1987 NCAA Tournament the Wildcats were invited as a #8 seed. But Kentucky would be one and done after dropping their opening contest to Ohio State 91–77.

== Schedule ==
Date time, TV	Rank^{#}	Opponent^{#}	Result	Record	High points	High rebounds	High assists	Site (attendance) city, state
November 29*	No. 11	Austin Peay	W 71–69	1–0	–	–	–	Rupp Arena; Lexington, KY
December 2*	No. 11	Texas Tech	W 66–60	2–0	–	–	–	Rupp Arena; Lexington, KY
December 6*	No. 13	at No. 3 Indiana; Indiana–Kentucky rivalry	L 66–71	2–1	–	–	–	Assembly Hall; Bloomington, IN
December 13*	No. 19	Lamar	W 71–56	3–1	–	–	–	Rupp Arena; Lexington, KY
December 19*	No. 19	Iona; UK Invitation Tournament	W 75–59	4–1	–	–	–	Rupp Arena; Lexington, KY
December 20*	No. 18	Boston University; UK Invitation Tournament	W 81–69	5–1	–	–	–	Rupp Arena; Lexington, KY
December 27*	No. 18	at Louisville	W 85–51	6–1	–	–	–	Freedom Hall; Louisville, KY
December 30	No. 11	vs. Georgia	L 65–69	6–2 (0–1)	–	–	–	Freedom Hall; Louisville, KY
January 3	No. 11	at No. 5 Auburn	W 63–60	7–2 (1–1)	–	–	–	Beard–Eaves–Memorial Coliseum; Auburn, AL
January 7 JPT	No. 9	Alabama	L 55–69	7–3 (1–2)	–	–	–	Rupp Arena; Lexington, KY
January 10	No. 9	at Tennessee	L 68–75	7–4 (1–3)	–	–	–	Stokely Athletics Center; Knoxville, TN
January 12	No. 9	at Mississippi State	W 57–49	8–4 (2–3)	–	–	–	Humphrey Coliseum; Starkville, MS
January 14		Florida	W 67–62	9–4 (3–3)	–	–	–	Rupp Arena; Lexington, KY
January 18; ABC		LSU	L 41–76	9–5 (3–4)	–	–	–	Rupp Arena; Lexington, KY
January 21; JPT		at Vanderbilt	W 71–65	10–5 (4–4)	–	–	–	Memorial Coliseum; Nashville, TN
January 25*		No. 18 Navy	W 80–69	11–5	–	–	–	Rupp Arena; Lexington, KY
January 28		at Ole Miss	L 65–76	11–6 (4–5)	–	–	–	Tad Smith Coliseum; Oxford, MS
January 31; JPT		Mississippi State	W 50–36	12–6 (5–5)	–	–	–	Rupp Arena; Lexington, KY
February 4 JPT		No. 20 Auburn	W 75–71	13–6 (6–5)	–	–	–	Rupp Arena; Lexington, KY
February 7		at No. 9 Alabama	W 70–69	14–6 (7–5)	–	–	–	Coleman Coliseum; Tuscaloosa, AL
February 11		Tennessee	W 91–84 ^{OT}	15–6 (8–5)	26 – Chapman	7 – Jenkins	6 – Davender	Rupp Arena (23,002); Lexington, KY
February 14; JPT		at No. 19 Florida	L 56–74	15–7 (8–6)	–	–	–	O'Connell Center; Gainesville, FL
February 19		Vanderbilt	W 65–54	16–7 (9–6)	–	–	–	Rupp Arena; Lexington, KY
February 21		at LSU	L 52–65	16–8 (9–7)	–	–	–	Maravich Assembly Center; Baton Rouge, LA
February 25; JPT		at Georgia	L 71–79	16–9 (9–8)	–	–	–	Stegeman Coliseum; Athens, GA
February 28		Ole Miss	W 64–63	17–9 (10–8)	–	–	–	Rupp Arena; Lexington, KY
March 1*		No. 12 Oklahoma	W 75–74	18–9	–	–	–	Rupp Arena; Lexington, KY
March 6 JPT	(4)	vs. (5) Auburn; SEC tournament	L 72–79	18–10	17 – Tie	6 – Madison	4 – Chapman	The Omni (13,279); Atlanta, GA
March 13*	(8 SE)	vs. (9 SE) Ohio State; NCAA tournament	L 77–91	18–11	23 – Davender	5 – Lock	5 – Davender	The Omni (15,128); Atlanta, GA
*Non-conference game. ^{#}Rankings from AP Poll. (#) Tournament seedings in parentheses. SE=Southeast.

== Roster ==
1986–87 Kentucky Wildcats men's basketball team
Players
Coaches

Pos.	#	Name	Height	Weight	Year	Previous school	Hometown
G	14	Paul Andrews (C)	6 ft 2 in (1.88 m)	180 lb (82 kg)	Sr	Laurel County	London, KY
F	25	Winston Bennett (redshirt)	6 ft 7 in (2.01 m)	210 lb (95 kg)	Jr	Male	Louisville, KY
G	10	James Blackmon (C)	6 ft 3 in (1.91 m)	180 lb (82 kg)	Sr	Marion	Marion, IN
G	20	Steve Bruce	6 ft 4 in (1.93 m)	175 lb (79 kg)	So	Woodford County	Versailles, KY
G	3	Rex Chapman	6 ft 5 in (1.96 m)	185 lb (84 kg)	Fr	Apollo	Owensboro, KY
G	15	Ed Davender	6 ft 2 in (1.88 m)	165 lb (75 kg)	Jr	Boys and Girls	Brooklyn, NY
F	55	Cedric Jenkins	6 ft 11 in (2.11 m)	185 lb (84 kg)	Jr	Terrell County	Dawson, GA
C	44	Rob Lock	6 ft 11 in (2.11 m)	235 lb (107 kg)	Jr	Reedley	Reedley, CA
F	42	Richard Madison	6 ft 6 in (1.98 m)	215 lb (98 kg)	Jr	Northside	Memphis, TN
G	4	Derrick Miller	6 ft 6 in (1.98 m)	170 lb (77 kg)	Fr	Baptist Bible	Savannah, GA
C	50	Mike Scott	6 ft 10 in (2.08 m)	230 lb (104 kg)	So	Greenup County	South Shore, KY
G	21	Terry Shigg	6 ft 2 in (1.88 m)	170 lb (77 kg)	Fr	Central	Rapid City, SD
F	30	Irving Thomas	6 ft 8 in (2.03 m)	220 lb (100 kg)	So	Carol City	Miami, FL

Head coach

- Eddie Sutton

Assistant coach(es)

- Doug Barnes
- Wayne Breeden
- Dwane Casey
- James Dickey

Legend

- (C) Team captain
- (S) Suspended
- (I) Ineligible
- (W) Walk-on
- Injured
- Current redshirt

Roster
Last update: 2016-01-10

== Season summary ==
- Feb. 11 vs. Tennessee: Kentucky rallied from 10 down with 1:13 left in the game. Rex Chapman hit a running 12-footer over Tennessee's Doug Roth with three seconds left to force overtime, where the Wildcats eventually won.

== Awards ==
Rex Chapman

- 1st Team All-SEC (Coaches)
- 2nd Team All-SEC (AP, UPI)
- Freshman All-SEC

Ed Davender

- 2nd Team All-SEC (UPI)
- 3rd Team All-SEC (AP)
