= 1986–87 Florida Gators men's basketball team =

American college basketball season

1986–87 Florida Gators men's basketball

NCAA tournament, Sweet Sixteen
- Conference: Southeastern Conference
- Record: 23–11 (12–6 SEC)
- Head coach: Norm Sloan (7th season)
- Assistant coach: Monte Towe (7th season)
- Home arena: O'Connell Center

1986–87 Southeastern Conference men's basketball standings
	Conf.				Overall
Team	W		L	PCT	W		L	PCT
No. 9 Alabama †	16	–	2	.889	28	–	5	.848
Florida	12	–	6	.667	23	–	11	.676
Georgia	10	–	8	.556	18	–	12	.600
Kentucky	10	–	8	.556	18	–	11	.621
Auburn	9	–	9	.500	18	–	13	.581
Ole Miss	8	–	10	.444	15	–	14	.517
LSU	8	–	10	.444	24	–	15	.615
Tennessee	7	–	11	.389	14	–	15	.483
Vanderbilt	7	–	11	.389	18	–	16	.529
Mississippi State	3	–	15	.167	7	–	21	.250
† 1987 SEC tournament winner Rankings from AP Poll

The 1986–87 Florida Gators men's basketball team represented the University of Florida as a member of the Southeastern Conference during the 1986–87 NCAA men's basketball season. Led by head coach Norm Sloan, the team played their home games at the O'Connell Center in Gainesville, Florida. After finishing second in the SEC regular season standings, Florida was bounced in the quarterfinal round of the SEC Tournament by LSU. The Gators received an at-large bid to the NCAA tournament, the school's (technically) first appearance in the tournament, where they made a run to the Sweet Sixteen. In the opening round, Florida defeated NC State and followed that by knocking off No. 3 seed Purdue. The run ended in the East Regional semifinal, where Florida was beaten by eventual National runner-up Syracuse, 87–81. The team finished with a record of 23–11 (12–6 SEC).

== Roster ==
1986–87 Florida Gators men's basketball team
Players
Coaches

Pos.	#	Name	Height	Weight	Year	Hometown
G	11	Vernon Maxwell	6 ft 4 in (1.93 m)	175 lb (79 kg)	Jr	Buchholz	Gainesville, Florida
G	23	Clifford Lett	6 ft 3 in (1.91 m)	165 lb (75 kg)	So	Pensacola	Pensacola, Florida
C	33	Dwayne Schintzius	7 ft 1 in (2.16 m)	235 lb (107 kg)	Fr	Brandon	Brandon, Florida
G	5	Andrew Moten	6 ft 0 in (1.83 m)	—	Sr

Head coach

- Norm Sloan

Assistant coach(es)

Legend

- (C) Team captain
- (S) Suspended
- (I) Ineligible
- (W) Walk-on
- Injured
- Current redshirt

== Schedule and results ==
Date time, TV	Rank^{#}	Opponent^{#}	Result	Record	Site city, state
Regular season
Nov 28, 1986*		at Florida State	L 76–80	0–1	Donald L. Tucker Center; Tallahassee, Florida
Dec 1, 1986*		vs. Stetson	W 98–75	1–1	
Dec 2, 1986*		Western Carolina	W 116–68	2–1	Stephen C. O'Connell Center; Gainesville, Florida
Dec 4, 1986*		vs. SMU	W 110–70	3–1	
Dec 10, 1986*		Central Florida	W 89–54	4–1	Stephen C. O'Connell Center; Gainesville, Florida
Dec 13, 1986*		at South Florida	W 68–62	5–1	Sun Dome; Tampa, Florida
Dec 16, 1986		LSU	W 96–75	6–1 (1–0)	Stephen C. O'Connell Center; Gainesville, Florida
Dec 19, 1986*		vs. Virginia Tech; Gator Bowl Tournament	W 82–60	7–1	Jacksonville Memorial Coliseum; Jacksonville, Florida
Dec 20, 1986*		vs. Ohio State; Gator Bowl Tournament	W 82–72	8–1	Jacksonville Memorial Coliseum; Jacksonville, Florida
Dec 27, 1986*	No. 20	vs. California; Rainbow Classic	L 80–83	8–2	Neal S. Blaisdell Center; Honolulu, Hawaii
Dec 29, 1986*	No. 20	at Hawaii; Rainbow Classic	W 110–83	9–2	Neal S. Blaisdell Center; Honolulu, Hawaii
Dec 30, 1986*	No. 20	vs. Ohio State; Rainbow Classic	L 84–88	9–3	Neal S. Blaisdell Center; Honolulu, Hawaii
Jan 3, 1987; 3:00 p.m., JPT		at Georgia	W 87–80	10–3 (2–0)	Stegeman Coliseum; Athens, Georgia
Jan 7, 1987		Mississippi State	W 100–56	11–3 (3–0)	Stephen C. O'Connell Center; Gainesville, Florida
Jan 10, 1987		at Ole Miss	W 80–72	12–3 (4–0)	Tad Smith Coliseum; Oxford, Mississippi
Jan 14, 1987		at Kentucky	L 62–67	12–4 (4–1)	Rupp Arena; Lexington, Kentucky
Jan 17, 1987		Tennessee	W 97–90	13–4 (5–1)	Stephen C. O'Connell Center; Gainesville, Florida
Jan 21, 1987		at LSU	W 75–51	14–4 (6–1)	Maravich Assembly Center; Baton Rouge, Louisiana
Jan 24, 1987		Vanderbilt	W 85–81	15–4 (7–1)	Stephen C. O'Connell Center; Gainesville, Florida
Jan 28, 1987	No. 19	No. 9 Alabama	W 90–80	16–4 (8–1)	Stephen C. O'Connell Center; Gainesville, Florida
Jan 31, 1987	No. 19	at No. 18 Auburn	L 68–81	16–5 (8–2)	Beard-Eaves-Memorial Coliseum; Auburn, Alabama
Feb 4, 1987		Georgia	W 66–52	17–5 (9–2)	Stephen C. O'Connell Center; Gainesville, Florida
Feb 7, 1987		at Mississippi State	W 84–56	18–5 (10–2)	Humphrey Coliseum; Starkville, Mississippi
Feb 9, 1987	No. 19	Auburn	L 70–84	18–6 (10–3)	Stephen C. O'Connell Center; Gainesville, Florida
Feb 11, 1987	No. 19	Ole Miss	W 85–62	19–6 (11–3)	Stephen C. O'Connell Center; Gainesville, Florida
Feb 14, 1987; 3:00 p.m., JPT	No. 19	Kentucky	W 74–56	20–6 (12–3)	Stephen C. O'Connell Center; Gainesville, Florida
Feb 18, 1987; 8:00 p.m., JPT	No. 18	at Tennessee	L 71–81	20–7 (12–4)	Stokely Athletics Center; Knoxville, Tennessee
Feb 21, 1987*	No. 18	Miami (FL)	W 99–60	21–7	Stephen C. O'Connell Center; Gainesville, Florida
Feb 25, 1987	No. 18	at Vanderbilt	L 76–84	21–8 (12–5)	Memorial Gymnasium; Nashville, Tennessee
Feb 28, 1987; 3:00 p.m., JPT	No. 18	at No. 10 Alabama	L 85–86	21–9 (12–6)	Coleman Coliseum; Tuscaloosa, Alabama
SEC Tournament
Mar 6, 1987*; JPT		vs. LSU; Quarterfinals	L 66–72	21–10	The Omni; Atlanta, Georgia
NCAA Tournament
Mar 13, 1987*	(6 E)	vs. (11 E) NC State; First round	W 82–70	22–10	Carrier Dome; Syracuse, New York
Mar 15, 1987*	(6 E)	vs. (3 E) No. 7 Purdue; Second round	W 85–66	23–10	Carrier Dome; Syracuse, New York
Mar 19, 1987*; CBS	(6 E)	vs. (2 E) No. 10 Syracuse; East Regional semifinal – Sweet Sixteen	L 81–87	23–11	Brendan Byrne Arena; East Rutherford, New Jersey
*Non-conference game. ^{#}Rankings from AP Poll. (#) Tournament seedings in parentheses. The NCAA tournament results were vacated.
