= 1987 ACC men's basketball tournament =

American college basketball postseason tournament

- Classification: Division I
- Season: 1986–87
- Teams: 8
- Site: Capital Centre; Landover, Maryland
- Champions: NC State (10th title)
- Winning coach: Jim Valvano (2nd title)
- MVP: Vinny Del Negro (NC State)
- Television: Raycom/Jefferson Pilot, NBC (Championship Game, Outside the ACC Footprint)

1986–87 ACC men's basketball standings
| | Conf. | | | | Overall |
| Team | W | | L | PCT | W | | L | PCT |
|---|---|---|---|---|---|---|---|---|
| No. 2 North Carolina | 14 | – | 0 | 1.000 | 32 | – | 4 | .889 |
| No. 13 Clemson | 10 | – | 4 | .714 | 25 | – | 6 | .806 |
| No. 17 Duke | 9 | – | 5 | .643 | 24 | – | 9 | .727 |
| Virginia | 8 | – | 6 | .571 | 21 | – | 10 | .677 |
| Georgia Tech | 7 | – | 7 | .500 | 16 | – | 13 | .552 |
| NC State † | 6 | – | 8 | .429 | 20 | – | 14 | .588 |
| Wake Forest | 2 | – | 12 | .143 | 14 | – | 15 | .483 |
| Maryland | 0 | – | 14 | .000 | 9 | – | 17 | .346 |
† 1987 ACC tournament winner Rankings from AP Poll

The 1987 Atlantic Coast Conference men's basketball tournament took place in Landover, Maryland, at the Capital Centre. NC State defeated North Carolina, 68–67 to win the championship. Vinny Del Negro of NC State was named tournament MVP. NC State defeated all three of their in-state rivals on their way to the tournament championship, beating Duke in the quarterfinal round, Wake Forest in the semifinal, and North Carolina in the championship game.

== Bracket ==
Quarterfinals; March 6
1 | #2 North Carolina | 82
8 | Maryland | 63
4 | Virginia | 55
5 | Georgia Tech | 54
3 | #14 Duke | 64
6 | NC State | 71^{OT}
2 | #13 Clemson | 62
7 | Wake Forest | 69

Semifinals; March 7
1 | #2 North Carolina | 84^{2OT}
4 | Virginia | 82
6 | NC State | 77^{2OT}
7 | Wake Forest | 73

Championship Game; March 8
1 | #2 North Carolina | 67
6 | NC State | 68
