= 1986–87 Auburn Tigers men's basketball team =

American college basketball season

1986–87 Auburn Tigers men's basketball

NCAA tournament, second round
- Conference: Southeastern Conference
- Record: 18–13 (9–9 SEC)
- Head coach: Sonny Smith (9th season)
- Home arena: Memorial Coliseum

1986–87 Southeastern Conference men's basketball standings
	Conf.				Overall
Team	W		L	PCT	W		L	PCT
No. 9 Alabama †	16	–	2	.889	28	–	5	.848
Florida	12	–	6	.667	23	–	11	.676
Georgia	10	–	8	.556	18	–	12	.600
Kentucky	10	–	8	.556	18	–	11	.621
Auburn	9	–	9	.500	18	–	13	.581
Ole Miss	8	–	10	.444	15	–	14	.517
LSU	8	–	10	.444	24	–	15	.615
Tennessee	7	–	11	.389	14	–	15	.483
Vanderbilt	7	–	11	.389	18	–	16	.529
Mississippi State	3	–	15	.167	7	–	21	.250
† 1987 SEC tournament winner Rankings from AP Poll

The 1986–87 Auburn Tigers men's basketball team represented Auburn University in the 1986–87 college basketball season. The team's head coach was Sonny Smith, who was in his ninth season at Auburn. The team played their home games at Memorial Coliseum in Auburn, Alabama. They finished the season 18–13, 9–9 in SEC play. They defeated Kentucky to advance to the semifinals of the SEC tournament where they lost to Alabama. They received an at-large bid to the NCAA tournament where they defeated San Diego to advance to the Second Round where they lost to Indiana.

The team lost Chuck Person to graduation and the NBA, and tried to offset the loss with sophomore transfer Aundrae Davis from West Virginia, but Davis was dismissed by coach Smith late in the season for violation of team rules.

Nevertheless, the team had a solid core with senior guards Gerald White and Frank Ford, junior forward Chris Morris, junior center Jeff Moore, and sophomore forward Mike Jones.

== Roster ==
1986–87 Auburn Tigers men's basketball team
Players
Coaches

Pos.	#	Name	Height	Weight	Year	Previous school	Hometown
G	15	Frank Ford	6 ft 4 in (1.93 m)	—	Sr	Osceola High School	Kissimmee, Florida
F	34	Chris Morris	6 ft 7 in (2.01 m)	—	Jr	Frederick Douglass High School	Atlanta, Georgia
F	13	Mike Jones	6 ft 7 in (2.01 m)	—	So	Columbus, Georgia
C	40	Jeff Moore	6 ft 8 in (2.03 m)	—	Jr	Midfield High School	Midfield, Alabama
G	12	Gerald White	6 ft 1 in (1.85 m)	—	Sr	Richmond Academy	Augusta, Georgia
G		Aundrae Davis	6 ft 5 in (1.96 m)	—	So	College Park, GA
G	10	Terrence Howard	6 ft 1 in (1.85 m)	—	Jr	Southwest High School	Southwest, AL
F	22	John Caylor	6 ft 6 in (1.98 m)	—	Fr	Morristown West High School	Talbott, Tennessee
G	24	Derrick Dennison	6 ft 4 in (1.93 m)	—	Fr	Douglass High School	Atlanta, Georgia
G	14	Johnny Lynn	6 ft 3 in (1.91 m)	—	Jr	Beech High School	Hendersonville, Tennessee
G	11	Melvin Haralson	6 ft 1 in (1.85 m)	—	So	Jackson, Mississippi

Head coach

- Sonny Smith (Milligan)

Assistant coach(es)

Legend

- (C) Team captain
- (S) Suspended
- (I) Ineligible
- (W) Walk-on
- Injured
- Current redshirt

== Schedule and results ==
Date time, TV	Rank^{#}	Opponent^{#}	Result	Record	Site (attendance) city, state
Regular season
Nov 28, 1986*	No. 12	at UAB	W 68-58	1-0	Birmingham-Jefferson Civic Center; Birmingham, AL
Dec 1, 1986*	No. 7	Armstrong	W 94-54	2-0	Beard-Eaves Memorial Coliseum; Auburn, AL
Dec 11, 1986*	No. 7	Austin Peay	W 115-93	3-0	Beard-Eaves Memorial Coliseum; Auburn, AL
Dec 13, 1986*	No. 7	Southwestern Louisiana	W 107-91	4-0	Beard-Eaves Memorial Coliseum; Auburn, AL
Dec 15, 1986*	No. 6	at Eastern Kentucky	W 97-82	5-0	McBrayer Arena; Richmond, KY
Dec 18, 1986*	No. 6	Augusta State	W 89-66	6-0	Beard-Eaves Memorial Coliseum; Auburn, AL
Dec 28, 1986*	No. 5	vs. Iowa State; Sun Bowl Tournament	W 89-87	7-0	Don Haskins Center; El Paso, TX
Dec 29, 1986*	No. 5	vs. Iowa State; Sun Bowl Tournament	L 82-87	7-1	Don Haskins Center; El Paso, TX
Jan 3, 1987	No. 5	No. 11 Kentucky	L 60-63	7-2 (0-1)	Beard-Eaves Memorial Coliseum; Auburn, AL
Jan 7, 1987	No. 13	Georgia	W 62-58	8-2 (1-1)	Beard-Eaves Memorial Coliseum; Auburn, AL
Jan 10, 1987; 2:00 p.m., JPT	No. 13	at Mississippi State	W 66-52	9-2 (2-1)	Humphrey Coliseum; Starkville, MS
Jan 14, 1987	No. 10	Tennessee	W 66-56	10-2 (3-1)	Beard-Eaves Memorial Coliseum; Auburn, AL
Jan 17, 1987	No. 10	at Vanderbilt	L 75-91	10-3 (3-2)	Memorial Gymnasium; Nashville, TN
Jan 21, 1987	No. 17	at No. 13 Alabama	L 82-88	10-4 (3-3)	Coleman Coliseum; Tuscaloosa, AL
Jan 24, 1987; 2:30 p.m., JPT	No. 17	Mississippi	W 85-61	11-4 (4-3)	Beard-Eaves Memorial Coliseum; Auburn, AL
Jan 28, 1987; 7:00 p.m., JPT	No. 18	at LSU	L 73-75	11-5 (4-4)	Maravich Assembly Center; Baton Rouge, LA
Jan 31, 1987	No. 18	No. 19 Florida	W 81-68	12-5 (5-4)	Beard-Eaves Memorial Coliseum; Auburn, AL
Feb 1, 1987	No. 18	No. 3 UNLV	L 85-104	12-6	Beard-Eaves Memorial Coliseum; Auburn, AL
Feb 7, 1987; 7:00 p.m., JPT	No. 20	at Kentucky	L 71-75	12-7 (5-5)	Rupp Arena; Lexington, KY
Feb 7, 1984	No. 20	at Georgia	L 71-75	12-8 (5-6)	Stegeman Coliseum; Athens, GA
Feb 9, 1987		at No. 19 Florida	W 84-70	13-8 (6-6)	Stephen C. O'Connell Center; Gainesville, FL
Feb 11, 1987		Mississippi State	W 59-45	14-8 (7-6)	Beard-Eaves Memorial Coliseum; Auburn, AL
Feb 14, 1987		at Tennessee	L 84-103	14-9 (7-7)	Stokley Center; Knoxville, TN
Feb 21, 1987; 2:00 p.m., JPT		No. 12 Alabama	L 75-77	14-10 (7-8)	Beard-Eaves Memorial Colisesum; Auburn, AL
Feb 23, 1987		Vanderbilt	W 91-83	15-10 (8-8)	Beard-Eaves Memorial Colliseum; Auburn, AL
Feb 25, 1987		at Mississippi	L 67-73	15-11 (8-9)	C.M. Tad Smith Coliseum; Oxford, MS
March 1, 1987; 2:00 p.m., JPT		LSU	W 100-62	16-11 (9-9)	Beard-Eaves Memorial Coliseum; Auburn, AL
SEC Tournament
March 6, 1987; JPT	(5)	vs. (4) Kentucky; Second round	W 79-72	17-11	The Omni; Atlanta, GA
March 7, 1987; JPT	(5)	vs. (1) No. 9 Alabama; Semifinals	L 68-87	17-12	The Omni; Atlanta, GA
NCAA Tournament
March 12, 1987*	(8 MW)	vs. (9 MW) San Diego; First round	W 62-61	18-12	Hoosier Dome; Indianapolis, IN
March 14, 1987*	(8 MW)	vs. (1 MW) No. 3 Indiana; Second round	L 90-107	18-13	Hoosier Dome; Indianapolis, IN
*Non-conference game. ^{#}Rankings from AP Poll. (#) Tournament seedings in parentheses. MW=Midwest. All times are in Central.
