= 1986–87 Washington State Cougars men's basketball team =

American college basketball season

1986–87 Washington State Cougars men's basketball
- Conference: Pacific-10
- Record: 10–18 (6–12 Pac-10)
- Head coach: Len Stevens (4th season)
- Assistant coaches: Kelvin Sampson; Prescott "Puck" Smith
- Home arena: Beasley Coliseum

1986–87 Pacific-10 Conference men's basketball standings
	Conf.				Overall
Team	W		L	PCT	W		L	PCT
No. 15 UCLA †	14	–	4	.778	25	–	7	.781
Arizona	13	–	5	.722	18	–	12	.600
Washington	10	–	8	.556	20	–	15	.571
California	10	–	8	.556	20	–	15	.571
Oregon State	10	–	8	.556	19	–	11	.633
Stanford	9	–	9	.500	15	–	13	.536
Oregon	8	–	10	.444	16	–	14	.533
Arizona State	6	–	12	.333	11	–	17	.393
Washington State	6	–	12	.333	10	–	18	.357
USC	4	–	14	.222	9	–	19	.321
† 1987 Pacific-10 Tournament winner As of March 25, 1987; Rankings from AP poll

The 1986–87 Washington State Cougars men's basketball team represented Washington State University for the 1986–87 NCAA Division I men's basketball season. Led by fourth-year head coach Len Stevens, the Cougars were members of the Pacific-10 Conference and played their home games on campus at Beasley Coliseum in Pullman, Washington.

The Cougars were 10–17 overall in the regular season and 6–12 in conference play, tied for eighth in the standings.

The conference tournament debuted this year; seeded ninth, WSU lost to eighth-seed Arizona State by sixteen points in the opening round.

A month after the season ended, Stevens resigned in early April to become head coach at Nevada, then a member of the Big Sky Conference; assistant Kelvin Sampson was soon promoted to head coach, and led the program for seven seasons.

== Postseason result ==
Date time, TV	Rank^{#}	Opponent^{#}	Result	Record	Site (attendance) city, state
Pacific-10 Tournament
Thu, March 5; 7:00 pm	(9)	vs. (8) Arizona State; First round	L 60–76	10–18	Pauley Pavilion (4,851); Los Angeles, California
*Non-conference game. ^{#}Rankings from AP poll. (#) Tournament seedings in parentheses. All times are in Pacific time.
