= 1986–87 North Carolina Tar Heels men's basketball team =

American college basketball season

1986–87 North Carolina Tar Heels men's basketball

ACC regular season champions

NCAA Tournament, Elite Eight
- Conference: Atlantic Coast Conference

Ranking
- Coaches: No. 3
- AP: No. 2
- Record: 32–4 (14–0 ACC)
- Head coach: Dean Smith (25th season)
- Assistant coaches: Bill Guthridge (19th season); Roy Williams (9th season); Dick Harp (1st season)
- Home arena: Dean Smith Center

1986–87 ACC men's basketball standings
	Conf.				Overall
Team	W		L	PCT	W		L	PCT
No. 2 North Carolina	14	–	0	1.000	32	–	4	.889
No. 13 Clemson	10	–	4	.714	25	–	6	.806
No. 17 Duke	9	–	5	.643	24	–	9	.727
Virginia	8	–	6	.571	21	–	10	.677
Georgia Tech	7	–	7	.500	16	–	13	.552
NC State †	6	–	8	.429	20	–	14	.588
Wake Forest	2	–	12	.143	14	–	15	.483
Maryland	0	–	14	.000	9	–	17	.346
† 1987 ACC tournament winner Rankings from AP Poll

The 1986–87 North Carolina Tar Heels men's basketball team represented the University of North Carolina at Chapel Hill.

Led by head coach Dean Smith, the Tar Heels won the ACC regular season title, reached the Elite Eight in the NCAA Tournament, and achieved a top-five ranking in the final AP poll.

== Roster ==
1986–87 North Carolina Tar Heels men's basketball team
Players
Coaches

Pos.	#	Name	Height	Weight	Year	Hometown
G	3	Jeff Denny	6 ft 4 in (1.93 m)	—	Fr	Rural Hall, North Carolina
G	11	Rodney Hyatt	5 ft 8 in (1.73 m)	—	Fr	Wadesboro, North Carolina
G	14	Jeff Lebo	6 ft 3 in (1.91 m)	180 lb (82 kg)	So	Carlisle, Pennsylvania
F	20	Steve Bucknall	6 ft 6 in (1.98 m)	215 lb (98 kg)	So	London, England
G	21	Michael Norwood	6 ft 3 in (1.91 m)	—	Sr	Henderson, North Carolina
F	24	Joe Wolf	6 ft 11 in (2.11 m)	230 lb (104 kg)	Sr	Kohler, Wisconsin
G	30	Kenny Smith	6 ft 3 in (1.91 m)	170 lb (77 kg)	Sr	New York City, New York
G	33	Ranzino Smith	6 ft 1 in (1.85 m)	—	Jr	Chapel Hill, North Carolina
F	34	J. R. Reid	6 ft 9 in (2.06 m)	245 lb (111 kg)	Fr	Virginia Beach, Virginia
F/C	35	Dave Popson	6 ft 10 in (2.08 m)	220 lb (100 kg)	Sr	Ashley, Pennsylvania
C	42	Scott Williams	6 ft 11 in (2.11 m)	230 lb (104 kg)	Fr	Hacienda Heights, California
F	43	Curtis Hunter	6 ft 5 in (1.96 m)	—	Sr	Durham, North Carolina
F	45	Marty Hensley	6 ft 10 in (2.08 m)	—	Fr	Marion, North Carolina

Head coach

- Dean Smith (Kansas)

Assistant coach(es)

- Bill Guthridge (Kansas State)
- Roy Williams (North Carolina)

Legend

- (C) Team captain
- (S) Suspended
- (I) Ineligible
- (W) Walk-on
- Injured
- Current redshirt

== Schedule and results ==
Date time, TV	Rank^{#}	Opponent^{#}	Result	Record	Site city, state
Regular season
Nov 28, 1986*	No. 1	at Hawaii	W 98–78	1–0	Neal S. Blaisdell Center; Honolulu, HI
Dec 1, 1986*	No. 1	at UCLA	L 84–89	1–1	Pauley Pavilion; Los Angeles, CA
Dec 3, 1986*	No. 1	Stetson	W 100–64	2–1	Dean Smith Center; Chapel Hill, NC
Dec 6, 1986*	No. 1	Miami	W 122–77	3–1	Dean Smith Center; Chapel Hill, NC
Dec 13, 1986*	No. 5	Jacksonville	W 98–69	4–1	Dean Smith Center; Chapel Hill, NC
Dec 20, 1986*	No. 4	No. 5 Illinois	W 90–77	5–1	Dean Smith Center; Chapel Hill, NC
Dec 22, 1986*	No. 4	Furman	W 95–65	6–1	Charlotte Coliseum; Charlotte, NC
Dec 27, 1986*	No. 4	Kansas State	W 81–62	7–1	Kemper Arena; Kansas City, MO
Dec 29, 1986*	No. 4	No. 2 Purdue; The Dallas Morning News Classic	W 94–81	8–1	Reunion Arena; Dallas, TX
Dec 30, 1986*	No. 4	at Southern Methodist; The Dallas Morning News Classic	W 88–86 ^{OT}	9–1	Reunion Arena; Dallas, TX
Jan 3, 1987*	No. 4	at La Salle	W 79–72	10–1	The Palestra; Philadelphia, PA
Jan 8, 1987	No. 3	vs. Maryland	W 98–65	11–1 (1-0)	Dean Smith Center; Chapel Hill, NC
Jan 10, 1987	No. 3	at No. 17 Duke	W 85–77	12–1 (2-0)	Cameron Indoor Stadium; Durham, NC
Jan 14, 1987	No. 3	at Virginia	W 95–80	13–1 (3-0)	University Hall; Charlottesville, VA
Jan 18, 1987	No. 2	vs. No. 17 NC State	W 96–78	14–1 (4-0)	Dean Smith Center; Chapel Hill, NC
Jan 22, 1987	No. 2	at Wake Forest	W 79–53	15–1 (5-0)	Greensboro Coliseum; Greensboro, NC
Jan 24, 1987	No. 2	vs. Georgia Tech	W 92–55	16–1 (6-0)	Dean Smith Center; Chapel Hill, NC
Jan 28, 1987	No. 1	at No. 14 Clemson	W 108–99	17–1 (7-0)	Littlejohn Coliseum; Clemson, SC
Feb 1, 1987*	No. 1	at Notre Dame	L 58–60	17–2	Joyce Center; Notre Dame, IN
Feb 5, 1987	No. 3	at NC State	W 96–79	18–2 (8-0)	Reynolds Coliseum; Raleigh, NC
Feb 8, 1987	No. 3	vs. Virginia	W 74–73	19–2 (9-0)	Dean Smith Center; Chapel Hill, NC
Feb 11, 1987	No. 3	vs. Wake Forest	W 94–85	20–2 (10-0)	Dean Smith Center; Chapel Hill, NC
Feb 14, 1987	No. 3	at Maryland	W 93–86	21–2 (11-0)	Cole Fieldhouse; College Park, MD
Feb 15, 1987*	No. 3	vs. Marquette	W 83–74	22–2	Dean Smith Center; Chapel Hill, NC
Feb 18, 1987*	No. 3	vs. East Tennessee State	W 118–65	23–2	Dean Smith Center; Chapel Hill, NC
Feb 21, 1987	No. 2	vs. No. 10 Clemson	W 96–80	24–2 (12–0)	Dean Smith Center; Chapel Hill, NC
Feb 26, 1987	No. 2	vs. No. 17 Duke	W 77–71	25–2 (13–0)	Dean Smith Center; Chapel Hill, NC
Mar 1, 1987	No. 2	vs. Georgia Tech	W 92–76	26–2 (14–0)	The Omni; Atlanta, GA
ACC Tournament
Mar 6, 1987	(1) No. 2	at (8) Maryland; Quarterfinals	W 82–63	27–2	Capital Centre; Landover, MD
Mar 7, 1987	(1) No. 2	vs. (4) Virginia; Semifinals	W 84–82 ^{2OT}	28–2	Capital Centre; Landover, MD
Mar 8, 1987	(1) No. 2	vs. (6) NC State; Championship	L 67–68	28–3	Capital Centre; Landover, MD
NCAA Tournament
Mar 12, 1987*	(1 E) No. 2	vs. (16 E) Penn; First round	W 113–82	29–3	Charlotte Coliseum; Charlotte, NC
Mar 14, 1987*	(1 E) No. 2	vs. (9 E) Michigan; Second Round	W 109–97	30–3	Charlotte Coliseum; Charlotte, NC
Mar 19, 1987*	(1 E) No. 2	vs. (5 E) No. 18 Notre Dame; Sweet Sixteen	W 74–68	31–3	Brendan Byrne Arena; East Rutherford, New Jersey
Mar 21, 1987*	(1 E) No. 2	vs. (2 E) No. 10 Syracuse; Elite Eight	L 75–79	31–4	Brendan Byrne Arena; East Rutherford, New Jersey
*Non-conference game. ^{#}Rankings from AP Poll. (#) Tournament seedings in parentheses. E=East region. All times are in Eastern Time.
