= 1986–87 Georgia Tech Yellow Jackets men's basketball team =

American college basketball season

1986–87 Georgia Tech Yellow Jackets men's basketball

NCAA tournament
- Conference: Atlantic Coast Conference
- Record: 16–13 (7–7 ACC)
- Head coach: Bobby Cremins (6th season)
- Assistant coaches: Perry Clark (5th season); Kevin Cantwell (1st season); Jimmy Hebron (6th season)
- Home arena: Alexander Memorial Coliseum

1986–87 ACC men's basketball standings
	Conf.				Overall
Team	W		L	PCT	W		L	PCT
No. 2 North Carolina	14	–	0	1.000	32	–	4	.889
No. 13 Clemson	10	–	4	.714	25	–	6	.806
No. 17 Duke	9	–	5	.643	24	–	9	.727
Virginia	8	–	6	.571	21	–	10	.677
Georgia Tech	7	–	7	.500	16	–	13	.552
NC State †	6	–	8	.429	20	–	14	.588
Wake Forest	2	–	12	.143	14	–	15	.483
Maryland	0	–	14	.000	9	–	17	.346
† 1987 ACC tournament winner Rankings from AP Poll

The 1986–87 Georgia Tech Yellow Jackets men's basketball team represented Georgia Institute of Technology during the 1986–87 NCAA Division I men's basketball season.

== Roster ==
1986–87 Georgia Tech Yellow Jackets men's basketball team
Players
Coaches

Pos.	#	Name	Height	Weight	Year	Hometown
G	10	Craig Neal	6 ft 4 in (1.93 m)	165 lb (75 kg)	Jr	Washington, Indiana
G	13	Brian Oliver	6 ft 4 in (1.93 m)	205 lb (93 kg)	Fr	Smyrna, Georgia
G	33	Duane Ferrell	6 ft 7 in (2.01 m)	205 lb (93 kg)	Jr	Baltimore, Maryland
G	45	Bruce Dalrymple	6 ft 4 in (1.93 m)	210 lb (95 kg)	Sr	Manhattan, New York

Head coach

- Bobby Cremins (South Carolina)

Assistant coach(es)

- Perry Clark (Gettysburg)
- Kevin Cantwell
- Jimmy Hebron

Legend

- (C) Team captain
- (S) Suspended
- (I) Ineligible
- (W) Walk-on
- Injured
- Current redshirt

== Schedule and results ==
Date time, TV	Rank^{#}	Opponent^{#}	Result	Record	Site city, state
Regular Season
Nov 28, 1986*	No. 6	vs. Stanford	W 67–65	1–0	Robins Center; Richmond, Virginia
Nov 29, 1986*	No. 6	at Richmond	L 62–67	1–1	Robins Center; Richmond, Virginia
Dec 1, 1986*	No. 15	Penn	W 84–57	2–1	Alexander Memorial Coliseum; Atlanta, Georgia
Dec 3, 1986*	No. 15	Georgia	W 72–66	3–1	Alexander Memorial Coliseum; Atlanta, Georgia
Dec 13, 1986*	No. 16	at LSU	L 49–52	3–2	LSU Assembly Center; Baton Rouge, Louisiana
Dec 20, 1986*		vs. Boston College	W 65–62	4–2	
Dec 21, 1986*		vs. SMU	W 63–54	5–2	
Dec 27, 1986*		vs. Rutgers	W 79–61	6–2	
Mar 1, 1987		vs. No. 2 North Carolina	L 76–92	16–11 (7–7)	The Omni; Atlanta, Georgia
ACC Tournament
Mar 6, 1987*		vs. Virginia; Quarterfinals	L 54–55	16–12	Capital Centre; Landover, Maryland
NCAA Tournament
Mar 13, 1987*	(7 MW)	vs. (10 MW) LSU; First round	L 79–85	16–13	Rosemont Horizon; Rosemont, Illinois
*Non-conference game. ^{#}Rankings from AP Poll. (#) Tournament seedings in parentheses. MW=Midwest.
