= 1986–87 UTEP Miners men's basketball team =

American college basketball season

1986–87 UTEP Miners men's basketball

WAC Regular Season champions

NCAA tournament, second round
- Conference: Western Athletic Conference

Ranking
- Coaches: No. 19
- Record: 25–7 (13–3 WAC)
- Head coach: Don Haskins (26th season)
- Assistant coaches: Rus Bradburd; Nate Archibald
- Home arena: Special Events Center

1986–87 WAC men's basketball standings
	Conf.				Overall
Team	W		L	PCT	W		L	PCT
UTEP	13	–	3	.813	25	–	7	.781
Brigham Young	12	–	4	.750	21	–	11	.656
New Mexico	11	–	5	.688	25	–	10	.714
Wyoming †	11	–	5	.688	24	–	10	.706
Utah	9	–	7	.563	17	–	13	.567
Colorado State	7	–	9	.438	13	–	16	.448
Air Force	5	–	11	.313	12	–	15	.444
Hawaii	2	–	14	.125	7	–	21	.250
San Diego State	2	–	14	.125	5	–	25	.167
† 1987 WAC tournament winner Rankings from AP Poll

The 1986–87 UTEP Miners men's basketball team represented the University of Texas at El Paso in the 1986–87 college basketball season. The team was led by head coach Don Haskins. The Miners finished 25–7 (13–3 in WAC), won the conference regular season title, and reached the second round of the NCAA tournament.

== Roster ==
1986–87 UTEP Miners men's basketball team
Players
Coaches

Pos.	#	Name	Height	Weight	Year	Hometown
G	10	Tim Hardaway	6 ft 0 in (1.83 m)	160 lb (73 kg)	So	Chicago, Illinois
F	34	Antonio Davis	6 ft 9 in (2.06 m)	220 lb (100 kg)	Fr	Oakland, California

Head coach

- Don Haskins

Assistant coach(es)

Legend

- (C) Team captain
- (S) Suspended
- (I) Ineligible
- (W) Walk-on
- Injured
- Current redshirt

== Schedule and results ==
Date time, TV	Rank^{#}	Opponent^{#}	Result	Record	Site city, state
Regular season
Feb 28, 1987		Wyoming	W 74–72	23–5 (13–3)	Special Events Center; El Paso, Texas
WAC tournament
Mar 6, 1987*		vs. San Diego State; WAC Tournament Quarterfinal	W 85–65	24–5	The Pit; Albuquerque, New Mexico
Mar 7, 1987*		vs. Wyoming; WAC Tournament Semifinal	L 74–77	24–6	The Pit; Albuquerque, New Mexico
NCAA tournament
Mar 13, 1987*	(7 W)	vs. (10 W) Arizona	W 98–91 ^{OT}	25–6	McKale Center; Tucson, Arizona
Mar 15, 1987*	(7 W)	vs. (2 W) No. 6 Iowa; Second Round	L 82–84	25–7	McKale Center; Tucson, Arizona
*Non-conference game. ^{#}Rankings from AP Poll. (#) Tournament seedings in parentheses. W=West.
