= 1986–87 Washington Huskies men's basketball team =

American college basketball season

1986–87 Washington Huskies men's basketball

National Invitation Tournament, Quarterfinal
- Conference: Pacific-10 Conference
- Record: 20–15 (10–8 Pac-10)
- Head coach: Andy Russo (2nd season)
- Home arena: Hec Edmundson Pavilion

1986–87 Pacific-10 Conference men's basketball standings
	Conf.				Overall
Team	W		L	PCT	W		L	PCT
No. 15 UCLA †	14	–	4	.778	25	–	7	.781
Arizona	13	–	5	.722	18	–	12	.600
Washington	10	–	8	.556	20	–	15	.571
California	10	–	8	.556	20	–	15	.571
Oregon State	10	–	8	.556	19	–	11	.633
Stanford	9	–	9	.500	15	–	13	.536
Oregon	8	–	10	.444	16	–	14	.533
Arizona State	6	–	12	.333	11	–	17	.393
Washington State	6	–	12	.333	10	–	18	.357
USC	4	–	14	.222	9	–	19	.321
† 1987 Pacific-10 Tournament winner As of March 25, 1987; Rankings from AP poll

The 1986–87 Washington Huskies men's basketball team represented the University of Washington for the 1986–87 NCAA Division I men's basketball season. Led by second-year head coach Andy Russo, the Huskies were members of the Pacific-10 Conference and played their home games on campus at Hec Edmundson Pavilion in Seattle, Washington.

The Huskies were 16–13 overall in the regular season and 10–8 in conference play, winning their final two games to tie for third in the standings. The conference tournament debuted this year and third-seeded Washington advanced to the final, but lost to host and top seed UCLA by twelve points.

Washington played in the National Invitation Tournament and advanced to the quarterfinals. They defeated Montana State in overtime in Bozeman, then Boise State in Seattle, but fell at Nebraska to end the season at 20–15.

== Postseason results ==
Date time, TV	Rank^{#}	Opponent^{#}	Result	Record	Site (attendance) city, state
Pacific-10 Tournament
Fri, March 6; 7:00 pm	(3)	vs. (6) Stanford; Quarterfinal	W 86–71	17–13	Pauley Pavilion; Los Angeles, California
Sat, March 7; 3:00 pm	(3)	vs. (7) Oregon; Semifinal	W 70–56	18–13	Pauley Pavilion (9,352); Los Angeles, California
Sun, March 8; 1:00 pm	(3)	at (1) No. 18 UCLA; Final	L 64–76	18–14	Pauley Pavilion (9,117); Los Angeles, California
National Invitation Tournament
Wed, March 11*; 6:30 pm		at Montana State; First round	W 98–90 ^{OT}	19–14	Brick Breeden Fieldhouse (7,848); Bozeman, Montana
Mon, March 16*; 7:30 pm		Boise State; Second round	W 73–68	20–14	Hec Edmundson Pavilion (4,480); Seattle, Washington
Sat, March 21*; 11:35 am		at Nebraska; Quarterfinal	L 76–81	20–15	Devaney Center (14,460); Lincoln, Nebraska
*Non-conference game. ^{#}Rankings from AP poll. (#) Tournament seedings in parentheses. All times are in Pacific time.
