= 1987 WAC men's basketball tournament =

- Classification: Division I
- Season: 1986–87
- Teams: 9
- Site: The Pit; Albuquerque, NM
- Champions: Wyoming (1st title)
- Winning coach: Jim Brandenburg (1st title)
- MVP: Eric Leckner (Wyoming)

1986–87 WAC men's basketball standings
	Conf.				Overall
Team	W		L	PCT	W		L	PCT
UTEP	13	–	3	.813	25	–	7	.781
Brigham Young	12	–	4	.750	21	–	11	.656
New Mexico	11	–	5	.688	25	–	10	.714
Wyoming †	11	–	5	.688	24	–	10	.706
Utah	9	–	7	.563	17	–	13	.567
Colorado State	7	–	9	.438	13	–	16	.448
Air Force	5	–	11	.313	12	–	15	.444
Hawaii	2	–	14	.125	7	–	21	.250
San Diego State	2	–	14	.125	5	–	25	.167
† 1987 WAC tournament winner Rankings from AP Poll

The 1987 Western Athletic Conference men's basketball tournament was held March 5–8 at the Pit at the University of New Mexico in Albuquerque, New Mexico.

Wyoming defeated tournament hosts New Mexico in the championship game, 64–62, to clinch their first WAC men's tournament championship.

The Cowboys, in turn, received an automatic bid to the 1987 NCAA tournament. The tournament's top two seeds, UTEP and BYU, also earned at-large bids to the tournament.

== Format ==
The tournament field remained fixed at nine teams, and teams were again seeded based on regular season conference records. All teams were entered into the quarterfinal round with the exception of the two lowest-seeded teams, who played in the preliminary first round to determine who would then play against the tournament's top seed.

== Bracket ==
First round Thursday, March 5
9	San Diego State	93
8	Hawaii	90

Quarterfinals; Friday, March 6
1	UTEP	85
9	San Diego State	65
5	Utah	54
4	Wyoming	56
3	New Mexico	92
6	Colorado State	77
7	Air Force	79
2	BYU	92

Semifinals; Saturday, March 7
1	UTEP	74
4	Wyoming	77
3	New Mexico	93
2	BYU	86

Championship; Sunday, March 8
4	Wyoming	64
3	New Mexico	62
