= 1986–87 LSU Tigers basketball team =

American college basketball season

1986–87 LSU Tigers basketball

NCAA tournament, Elite Eight
- Conference: Southeastern Conference
- Record: 24–15 (8–10 SEC)
- Head coach: Dale Brown (15th season)
- Assistant coaches: Ron Abernathy (11th season); Bo Bahnsen; Johnny Jones (3rd season)
- Home arena: LSU Assembly Center

1986–87 Southeastern Conference men's basketball standings
	Conf.				Overall
Team	W		L	PCT	W		L	PCT
No. 9 Alabama †	16	–	2	.889	28	–	5	.848
Florida	12	–	6	.667	23	–	11	.676
Georgia	10	–	8	.556	18	–	12	.600
Kentucky	10	–	8	.556	18	–	11	.621
Auburn	9	–	9	.500	18	–	13	.581
Ole Miss	8	–	10	.444	15	–	14	.517
LSU	8	–	10	.444	24	–	15	.615
Tennessee	7	–	11	.389	14	–	15	.483
Vanderbilt	7	–	11	.389	18	–	16	.529
Mississippi State	3	–	15	.167	7	–	21	.250
† 1987 SEC tournament winner Rankings from AP Poll

The 1986–87 LSU Tigers basketball team represented Louisiana State University in the Southeastern Conference (SEC) during the 1986–87 NCAA Division I men's basketball season. The team was coached by Dale Brown and played their home games at LSU Assembly Center in Baton Rouge, Louisiana.

A year after becoming the lowest seeded team (11th) in the NCAA tournament to reach the Final Four, the Tigers nearly reached the Final Four for the second straight season as a double-digit seed. The Tigers finished below .500 during SEC regular season play (8–10, tied for 6th), but played terrific basketball for four consecutive days in an attempt to earn the SEC's automatic bid by nearly winning the SEC tournament. They were beaten by Alabama in the championship game, but it was enough to secure an at-large bid to the NCAA tournament. As the No. 10 seed in the Midwest region, LSU beat No. 7 seed Georgia Tech, No. 2 seed Temple, and No. 3 seed DePaul to reach the Elite Eight – the 4th of Coach Brown’s tenure. In the Midwest regional final, eventual National champion Indiana got by LSU by a single point, 77–76. The Tigers finished with a record of 24–15.

== Roster ==
1986–87 LSU Tigers men's basketball team
Players
Coaches

Pos.	#	Name	Height	Weight	Year	Previous school	Hometown
G	11	Anthony Wilson	6 ft 4 in (1.93 m)	192 lb (87 kg)	Sr	Plain Dealing HS	Plain Dealing, LA
G	12	Darryl Joe	6 ft 1 in (1.85 m)	170 lb (77 kg)	Fr	Panola College	Dallas, TX
G	20	Neboisha Bukumirovich	6 ft 4 in (1.93 m)	181 lb (82 kg)	Jr	Medical HS, Belgrade	Nikšić, Yugoslavia
G	21	Dennis Brown	6 ft 0 in (1.83 m)	169 lb (77 kg)	Sr	Woodlawn HS	Baton Rouge, LA
F	30	Bernard Woodside	6 ft 6 in (1.98 m)	207 lb (94 kg)	Jr	St. Agnes Cathedral HS	Hempstead, NY
G	31	Oliver Brown	6 ft 6 in (1.98 m)	195 lb (88 kg)	Sr	University HS	Baton Rouge, LA
F	33	Ricky Blanton (injured)	6 ft 7 in (2.01 m)	215 lb (98 kg)	Jr	Miami Killian	Miami, FL
F	41	Nikita Wilson	6 ft 7 in (2.01 m)	200 lb (91 kg)	Sr	Leesville HS	Leesville, LA
F	42	Ben McDonald	6 ft 7 in (2.01 m)	205 lb (93 kg)	Fr	Denham Springs HS	Denham Springs, LA
C	43	José Vargas	6 ft 9 in (2.06 m)	225 lb (102 kg)	Jr	Evangelico Central	La Romana, Dominican Republic

Head coach

- Dale Brown (Minot State)

Assistant coach(es)

- Ron Abernathy (Morehead State)
- Bo Bahnsen (LSU)
- Johnny Jones (LSU)

Legend

- (C) Team captain
- (S) Suspended
- (I) Ineligible
- (W) Walk-on
- Injured
- Current redshirt

Roster

== Schedule and results ==
Date time, TV	Rank^{#}	Opponent^{#}	Result	Record	Site city, state
Regular season
Nov 21, 1986*		Texas Christian; Preseason NIT	L 74–83	0–1	LSU Assembly Center; Baton Rouge, Louisiana
Dec 4, 1986*		Arkansas State	W 73–61	1–1	LSU Assembly Center; Baton Rouge, Louisiana
Dec 6, 1986*		at McNeese State	W 77–62	2–1	Burton Coliseum; Lake Charles, Louisiana
Dec 13, 1986*		No. 16 Georgia Tech	W 52–49	3–1	LSU Assembly Center; Baton Rouge, Louisiana
Dec 16, 1986		at Florida	L 75–96	3–2 (0–1)	Stephen C. O'Connell Center; Gainesville, Florida
Dec 19, 1986*		Hardin-Simmons	W 77–71	4–2	LSU Assembly Center; Baton Rouge, Louisiana
Dec 20, 1986*		New Orleans	L 71–82	4–3	LSU Assembly Center; Baton Rouge, Louisiana
Dec 22, 1986		Vanderbilt	L 61–63	4–4 (0–2)	LSU Assembly Center; Baton Rouge, Louisiana
Dec 29, 1986*		vs. West Virginia State; Seasider Classic	W 93–76	5–4	Laie, Hawaii
Dec 30, 1986*		vs. Illinois-Chicago; Seasider Classic	W 117–84	6–4	Laie, Hawaii
Dec 31, 1986*		vs. BYU–Hawaii; Seasider Classic	W 85–70	7–4	Laie, Hawaii
Jan 1, 1987*		vs. Denison	W 99–45	8–4	Laie, Hawaii
Jan 5, 1987		at Ole Miss	L 63–73	8–5 (0–3)	Tad Smith Coliseum; Oxford, Mississippi
Jan 7, 1987		at Tennessee	W 79–78	9–5 (1–3)	Stokely Athletic Center; Knoxville, Tennessee
Jan 10, 1987		Georgia	L 63–64	9–6 (1–4)	LSU Assembly Center; Baton Rouge, Louisiana
Jan 12, 1987*		vs. No. 16 Oklahoma	L 85–94	9–7	Myriad Convention Center; Oklahoma City, Oklahoma
Jan 14, 1987		at No. 15 Alabama	L 65–69	9–8 (1–5)	Coleman Coliseum; Tuscaloosa, Alabama
Jan 18, 1987; ABC		at Kentucky	W 76–41	10–8 (2–5)	Rupp Arena; Lexington, Kentucky
Jan 21, 1987		Florida	L 51–75	10–9 (2–6)	Maravich Assembly Center; Baton Rouge, Louisiana
Jan 24, 1987*		Western Kentucky	W 67–62	11–9	LSU Assembly Center; Baton Rouge, Louisiana
Jan 25, 1987		at Mississippi State	W 52–50	12–9 (3–6)	Humphrey Coliseum; Starkville, Mississippi
Jan 28, 1987; 7:00 p.m., JPT		No. 18 Auburn	W 75–73	13–9 (4–6)	LSU Assembly Center; Baton Rouge, Louisiana
Jan 31, 1987		at Vanderbilt	L 65–66	13–10 (4–7)	Memorial Gymnasium; Nashville, Tennessee
Feb 4, 1987		Ole Miss	W 82–75	14–10 (5–7)	LSU Assembly Center; Baton Rouge, Louisiana
Feb 7, 1987; 2:00 p.m., JPT		Tennessee	W 60–58	15–10 (6–7)	LSU Assembly Center; Baton Rouge, Louisiana
Feb 9, 1987*		Northern Arizona	W 70–58	16–10	LSU Assembly Center; Baton Rouge, Louisiana
Feb 11, 1987; 7:00 p.m., JPT		at Georgia	L 57–63	16–11 (6–8)	Stegeman Coliseum; Athens, Georgia
Feb 14, 1987		No. 14 Alabama	L 52–60	16–12 (6–9)	LSU Assembly Center; Baton Rouge, Louisiana
Feb 21, 1987		Kentucky	W 65–52	17–12 (7–9)	LSU Assembly Center; Baton Rouge, Louisiana
Feb 25, 1987		Mississippi State	W 55–46	18–12 (8–9)	LSU Assembly Center; Baton Rouge, Louisiana
Mar 1, 1987; JPT		at Auburn	L 62–100	18–13 (8–10)	Beard-Eaves-Memorial Coliseum; Auburn, Alabama
SEC tournament
Mar 5, 1987*; JPT	(7)	vs. (10) Mississippi State; First round	W 68–54	19–13	The Omni; Atlanta, Georgia
Mar 6, 1987*; JPT	(7)	vs. (2) Florida; Quarterfinals	W 72–66	20–13	The Omni; Atlanta, Georgia
Mar 7, 1987*; JPT	(7)	vs. (3) Georgia; Semifinals	W 89–88 ^{2OT}	21–13	The Omni; Atlanta, Georgia
Mar 8, 1987*; ABC	(7)	vs. (1) No. 9 Alabama; Championship Game	L 62–69	21–14	The Omni; Atlanta, Georgia
NCAA tournament
Mar 13, 1987*	(10 MW)	vs. (7 MW) Georgia Tech; First round	W 85–79	22–14	Rosemont Horizon; Rosemont, Illinois
Mar 15, 1987*	(10 MW)	vs. (2 MW) No. 8 Temple; Second Round	W 72–62	23–14	Rosemont Horizon; Rosemont, Illinois
Mar 20, 1987*; CBS	(10 MW)	vs. (3 MW) No. 5 DePaul; Midwest Regional semifinal – Sweet Sixteen	W 63–58	24–14	Riverfront Coliseum; Cincinnati, Ohio
Mar 22, 1987*; CBS	(10 MW)	vs. (1 MW) No. 3 Indiana; Midwest Regional Final – Elite Eight	L 76–77	24–15	Riverfront Coliseum; Cincinnati, Ohio
*Non-conference game. ^{#}Rankings from AP poll. (#) Tournament seedings in parentheses. MW=Midwest. All times are in Central Time.
