= 1986–87 Oregon State Beavers men's basketball team =

American college basketball season

1986–87 Oregon State Beavers men's basketball

National Invitation Tournament
- Conference: Pac-10 Conference
- Record: 19–11 (10–8 Pac 10)
- Head coach: Ralph Miller (17th season)
- Home arena: Gill Coliseum

1986–87 Pacific-10 Conference men's basketball standings
	Conf.				Overall
Team	W		L	PCT	W		L	PCT
No. 15 UCLA †	14	–	4	.778	25	–	7	.781
Arizona	13	–	5	.722	18	–	12	.600
Washington	10	–	8	.556	20	–	15	.571
California	10	–	8	.556	20	–	15	.571
Oregon State	10	–	8	.556	19	–	11	.633
Stanford	9	–	9	.500	15	–	13	.536
Oregon	8	–	10	.444	16	–	14	.533
Arizona State	6	–	12	.333	11	–	17	.393
Washington State	6	–	12	.333	10	–	18	.357
USC	4	–	14	.222	9	–	19	.321
† 1987 Pacific-10 Tournament winner As of March 25, 1987; Rankings from AP poll

The 1986–87 Oregon State Beavers men's basketball team represented Oregon State University in Corvallis, Oregon in the 1986–87 season.

Led by Ralph Miller, in his 17th season at Oregon State, the Beavers would finish with a record of 19–11 (10–8 Pac-10). The Beavers were invited to the 1987 NIT, where they lost in the second round to Cal.

== Roster ==
1986–87 Oregon State Beavers men's basketball team
Players
Coaches

Pos.	#	Name	Height	Weight	Year	Previous school	Hometown
C	4	José Ortiz	6 ft 11 in (2.11 m)	250 lb (113 kg)	Sr	Benjamin Harrison
G	15	Eric Knox	6 ft 2 in (1.88 m)	—	So
G	20	Gary Payton	6 ft 3 in (1.91 m)	175 lb (79 kg)	Fr	Skyline HS	Oakland, California
F		Bill Sherwood	6 ft 6 in (1.98 m)	—	Jr

Head coach

- Ralph Miller (Kansas)

Assistant coach(es)

Legend

- (C) Team captain
- (S) Suspended
- (I) Ineligible
- (W) Walk-on
- Injured
- Current redshirt

== Schedule and results ==
Date time, TV	Rank^{#}	Opponent^{#}	Result	Record	Site (attendance) city, state
Non-conference regular season
Pac-10 regular season
Mar 1, 1987		at Washington	L 61–63	17–9 (10–8)	Hec Edmundson Pavilion; Seattle, WA
Pac-10 Tournament
Mar 6, 1987*	(5)	vs. (4) California; Pac-10 tournament Quarterfinal	L 57–64	17–10	Pauley Pavilion; Los Angeles, California
National Invitation Tournament
Mar 13, 1987*		at New Mexico	W 85–82	18–10	The Pit/Bob King Court; Albuquerque, NM
Mar 16, 1987*		California	L 62–65	18–11	Gill Coliseum; Corvallis, OR
*Non-conference game. ^{#}Rankings from AP Poll. (#) Tournament seedings in parentheses.

== Awards and honors ==
- José Ortiz – Pac-10 Player of the Year and AP All-American (Honorable Mention)
