= Pooh Richardson =

American basketball player (born 1966)

Personal information
- Born: May 14, 1966 (age 60) Philadelphia, Pennsylvania, U.S.
- Listed height: 6 ft 1 in (1.85 m)
- Listed weight: 180 lb (82 kg)

Career information
- High school: Benjamin Franklin (Philadelphia, Pennsylvania)
- College: UCLA (1985–1989)
- NBA draft: 1989: 1st round, 10th overall pick
- Drafted by: Minnesota Timberwolves
- Playing career: 1989–2000
- Position: Point guard
- Number: 24, 2
- Coaching career: 2017–present

Career history

Playing
- 1989–1992: Minnesota Timberwolves
- 1992–1994: Indiana Pacers
- 1994–1999: Los Angeles Clippers
- 1999–2000: Adecco Milano

Coaching
- 2017–present: College of the Desert (assistant)

Career highlights
- NBA All-Rookie First Team (1990); 3× First-team All-Pac-10 (1987–1989); Pac-10 Freshman of the Year (1986); Second-team Parade All-American (1985); McDonald's All-American (1985)

Career NBA statistics
- Points: 7,083 (11.1 ppg)
- Rebounds: 1,807 (2.8 rpg)
- Assists: 4,180 (6.5 apg)
- Stats at NBA.com
- Stats at Basketball Reference

Jerome "Pooh" Richardson Jr. (born May 14, 1966) is an American former basketball player who played 10 seasons in the National Basketball Association (NBA). He was selected in the first round of the 1989 NBA draft by the Minnesota Timberwolves, the first draft pick in franchise history. He would also play for the Indiana Pacers and Los Angeles Clippers during his 10-year NBA career from 1989 to 1999.

Richardson played college basketball for the UCLA Bruins from 1985 to 1989. A three-time first-team all-conference selection in the Pac-10 (now the Pac-12), he set school career records for assists and three-point field goal percentage.

His nickname came from his grandmother, who thought he resembled Winnie the Pooh.

== Early life ==
Richardson grew up in Philadelphia, and played basketball in the Sonny Hill League. He was a McDonald's All-American while playing at Ben Franklin High School. He led Ben Franklin to the Public League championship in 1984. The Philadelphia Tribune called Richardson "a basketball legend in [Philadelphia]." Franklin retired his jersey in 2023.

== College ==
Recruited by head coach Walt Hazzard to play at the University of California, Los Angeles, Richardson was a four-year starter for the Bruins from 1985 through 1989. In his freshman year in 1985–86, he was honored as the Pac-10 Freshman of the Year as well as team's most valuable freshman player and outstanding defensive player. The following season, he was named first-team All-Pac-10. In his junior year, he was named the team's most valuable player (MVP) In Richardson's senior year in 1988–89, he was the team's MVP for the second consecutive year, first-team All-Pac-10 for the third year in a row, and the Bruins' outstanding defensive player for the second time in his career.

Richardson finished his career with UCLA records for most assists in a career (833), most assists in a season (236), (Note: Surpassed by Larry Drew II in 2012–13.) and highest career three-point field goal percentage (46.4).

== Professional playing career ==
The 6-foot-1-inch (1.85 m) point guard was taken by the Minnesota Timberwolves with the tenth overall pick of the 1989 NBA draft out of UCLA. He was their first ever draft choice and played with them for their first three seasons. During the 1992 offseason, he was traded along with Sam Mitchell to the Indiana Pacers in exchange for Chuck Person and Micheal Williams. In 1994, the Pacers dealt him to the Los Angeles Clippers along with Malik Sealy and 1994 draft pick Eric Piatkowski in exchange for Mark Jackson and the draft rights to Greg Minor.

After he retired from playing in the NBA, Richardson played a year in Milan at the request of Joe and Kobe Bryant, who were co-owners of the team.

== Coaching career ==
Richardson became an Amateur Athletic Union (AAU) coach in Coachella Valley, California, where he purchased a home during his time with Minnesota. In 2017, he became an assistant coach at the College of the Desert.
