= 1986–87 Duke Blue Devils men's basketball team =

American college basketball season

1986–87 Duke Blue Devils men's basketball

NCAA tournament, Sweet Sixteen
- Conference: Atlantic Coast Conference

Ranking
- AP: No. 17
- Record: 24–9 (9–5 ACC)
- Head coach: Mike Krzyzewski (7th season)
- Assistant coach: Chuck Swenson
- Home arena: Cameron Indoor Stadium

1986–87 ACC men's basketball standings
	Conf.				Overall
Team	W		L	PCT	W		L	PCT
No. 2 North Carolina	14	–	0	1.000	32	–	4	.889
No. 13 Clemson	10	–	4	.714	25	–	6	.806
No. 17 Duke	9	–	5	.643	24	–	9	.727
Virginia	8	–	6	.571	21	–	10	.677
Georgia Tech	7	–	7	.500	16	–	13	.552
NC State †	6	–	8	.429	20	–	14	.588
Wake Forest	2	–	12	.143	14	–	15	.483
Maryland	0	–	14	.000	9	–	17	.346
† 1987 ACC tournament winner Rankings from AP Poll

The 1986–87 Duke Blue Devils men's basketball team represented Duke University. The head coach was Mike Krzyzewski and the team finished the season with an overall record of 24–9. In the 1987 NCAA Tournament Duke was invited as a #5 seed. After posting two wins, Duke lost 88–82 to Indiana, the eventual national champion.

== Schedule ==
Date time, TV	Rank^{#}	Opponent^{#}	Result	Record	Site city, state
Regular season
November 28, 1986*		at BYU-Hawaii; BYU-Hawaii Thanksgiving Classic	W 85–68	1–0	Cannon Activities Center; Laie, HI
November 29, 1986*		vs. No. 14 Illinois; BYU-Hawaii Thanksgiving Classic	L 62–69	1–1	Cannon Activities Center; Laie, HI
December 3, 1986*		East Carolina	W 103–65	2–1	Cameron Indoor Stadium; Durham, NC
December 6, 1986*		Vanderbilt	W 78–66	3–1	Cameron Indoor Stadium; Durham, NC
December 8, 1986*		Davidson	W 95–65	4–1	Cameron Indoor Stadium; Durham, Nc
December 13, 1986*		vs. No. 18 Alabama	W 76–67	5–1	Brendan Byrne Arena; East Rutherford, NJ
December 22, 1986*		at Miami (FL)	W 74–67	6–1	Knight Center; Miami, FL
December 29, 1986*		Appalachian State	W 80–50	7–1	Cameron Indoor Stadium; Durham, NC
December 30, 1986*	No. 20	Northwestern	W 106–55	8–1	Cameron Indoor Stadium; Durham, NC
January 3, 1987	No. 20	at Virginia	W 70–63	9–1	University Hall; Charlottesville, VA
January 5, 1987*	No. 20	William & Mary	W 82–46	10–1	Cameron Indoor Stadium; Durham, NC
January 7, 1987	No. 17	St. Joseph’s	W 93–83	11–1	Cameron Indoor Stadium; Durham, NC
January 10, 1987	No. 17	No. 3 North Carolina; Rivalry	L 77–85	11–2	Cameron Indoor Stadium; Durham, NC
January 14, 1987	No. 14	at Maryland	W 85–61	12–2	Cole Field House; College Park, MD
January 17, 1987	No. 14	Wake Forest	W 69–49	13–2	Cameron Indoor Stadium; Durham, NC
January 21, 1987	No. 12	at No. 20 NC State	L 74–87	13–3	Reynolds Coliseum; Raleigh, NC
January 24, 1987	No. 12	at No. 10 Clemson	W 105–103 ^{OT}	14–3	Littlejohn Coliseum; Clemson, SC
January 26, 1987*	No. 12	Cornell	W 85–59	15–3	Cameron Indoor Stadium; Durham, NC
January 29, 1987	No. 13	at Georgia Tech	L 66–75	15–4	Alexander Memorial Coliseum; Atlanta, GA
January 31, 1987	No. 13	at Wake Forest	W 62–60 ^{OT}	16–4	Greensboro Coliseum; Greensboro, NC
February 2, 1987	No. 13	Stetson	W 62–59	17–4	Cameron Indoor Stadium; Durham, NC
February 4, 1987	No. 16	Virginia	W 75–61	18–4	Cameron Indoor Stadium; Durham, NC
February 7, 1987	No. 16	Maryland	W 76–67	19–4	Cameron Indoor Stadium; Durham, NC
February 10, 1987*	No. 15	at Harvard	W 98–86	20–4	Lavietes Pavilion; Boston, MA
February 15, 1987*	No. 15	at Notre Dame	L 66–70 ^{OT}	20–5	Joyce Center; South Bend, IN
February 19, 1987	No. 17	NC State	W 66–50	21–5	Cameron Indoor Stadium; Durham, NC
February 21, 1987	No. 17	Georgia Tech	L 72–79	21–6	Cameron Indoor Stadium; Durham, NC
February 26, 1987	No. 17	at No. 2 North Carolina; Rivalry	L 71–77	21–7	Dean Smith Center; Chapel Hill, NC
February 28, 1987	No. 17	No. 13 Clemson	W 65–59	22–7	Cameron Indoor Stadium; Durham, NC
ACC Tournament
March 6, 1987	No. 14	vs. NC State; Quarterfinals	L 64–71 ^{OT}	22–8	Capital Centre; Landover, MD
NCAA Tournament
March 12, 1987*	No. 17	vs. Texas A&M; First Round	W 58–51	23–8	Hoosier Dome; Indianapolis, IN
March 14, 1987*	No. 17	vs. Xavier; Second Round	W 65–60	24–8	Hoosier Dome; Indianapolis, IN
March 20, 1987*	No. 17	vs. No. 3 Indiana; Sweet Sixteen	L 82–88	24–9	Riverfront Coliseum; Cincinnati, OH
*Non-conference game. ^{#}Rankings from AP Poll. (#) Tournament seedings in parentheses. Source: Duke media guide
