= 1986–87 Wyoming Cowboys basketball team =

American college basketball season

1986–87 Wyoming Cowboys basketball

WAC Tournament Champions

NCAA men's Division I tournament, Sweet Sixteen
- Conference: Western Athletic Conference

Ranking
- Coaches: No. 17
- Record: 24–10 (11–5 WAC)
- Head coach: Jim Brandenburg (9th season)
- Home arena: Arena-Auditorium

1986–87 WAC men's basketball standings
	Conf.				Overall
Team	W		L	PCT	W		L	PCT
UTEP	13	–	3	.813	25	–	7	.781
Brigham Young	12	–	4	.750	21	–	11	.656
New Mexico	11	–	5	.688	25	–	10	.714
Wyoming †	11	–	5	.688	24	–	10	.706
Utah	9	–	7	.563	17	–	13	.567
Colorado State	7	–	9	.438	13	–	16	.448
Air Force	5	–	11	.313	12	–	15	.444
Hawaii	2	–	14	.125	7	–	21	.250
San Diego State	2	–	14	.125	5	–	25	.167
† 1987 WAC tournament winner Rankings from AP Poll

The 1986–87 Wyoming Cowboys basketball team represented the University of Wyoming in the 1986–87 NCAA Division I men's basketball season. ("Cowboys" is solely used to refer to the university's men's sports; women's teams and athletes are known as "Cowgirls".) The Cowboys, then a member of the Western Athletic Conference, played their home games at the Arena-Auditorium.

The Cowboys were led by Fennis Dembo, who led the 1987 NCAA Tournament in scoring by averaging 27.8 points per game.

== Roster ==
1986–87 Wyoming Cowboys men's basketball team
Players
Coaches

Pos.	#	Name	Height	Weight	Year	Previous school	Hometown
F	34	Fennis Dembo	6 ft 5 in (1.96 m)	205 lb (93 kg)	Jr	Fox Tech HS	San Antonio, Texas
C	43	Eric Leckner	6 ft 11 in (2.11 m)	255 lb (116 kg)	Jr	Mira Costa HS	Manhattan Beach, California

Head coach

- Jim Brandenburg (Colorado State)

Assistant coach(es)

Legend

- (C) Team captain
- (S) Suspended
- (I) Ineligible
- (W) Walk-on
- Injured
- Current redshirt

== Regular season ==
=== Player stats ===
Player	Games	Field goals	Three Pointers	Free Throws	Rebounds	Blocks	Steals	Points
Fennis Dembo	34	1236	240	78	282	17	50	689
Eric Leckner	34	148	12	74	100	2	30	382

== NCAA basketball tournament ==
- West
  - Wyoming 64 (12), Virginia (5) 60
  - Wyoming 78, UCLA (4) 68
  - UNLV (1) 92, Wyoming 78

== Team players drafted into the NBA ==
No one from the Cowboys was selected in the 1987 NBA draft. Fennis Dembo would be drafted in the 1988 NBA draft by the Detroit Pistons.

== Awards and honors ==
- Fennis Dembo, First Team All-Western Athletic Conference
- Fennis Dembo, Western Athletic Conference Player of the Year
