= List of Wichita State Shockers men's basketball seasons =

The Wichita State Shockers men's basketball team has competed in college basketball since the 1905–06 season.

== Seasons ==
Statistics overview
Season	Coach	Overall	Conference	Standing	Postseason
Willis Bates (Independent & Kansas Collegiate Athletic Conference) (1905–1908)
1905–06	Willis Bates	2–4			
1906–07	Willis Bates	3–6			
1907–08	Willis Bates	2–3			
(Independent & Kansas Collegiate Athletic Conference) (1908–1909)
1908–09	No coach	4–6	1–2		
Roy Thomas (Independent & Kansas Collegiate Athletic Conference) (1909–1912)
1909–10	Roy Thomas	3–10			
1910–11	Roy Thomas	7–6			
1911–12	Roy Thomas	2–8			
E.V. Long (Independent & Kansas Collegiate Athletic Conference) (1912–1913)
1912–13	E.V. Long	1–11	0–10		
Willis Bates (Independent & Kansas Collegiate Athletic Conference) (1913–1914)
1913–14	Willis Bates	8–7	4–6		
Harry Buck (Independent & Kansas Collegiate Athletic Conference) (1914–1916)
1914–15	Harry Buck	4–10			
1915–16	Harry Buck	10–5			
Lamar Hoover (Independent & Kansas Collegiate Athletic Conference) (1916–1918)
1916–17	Lamar Hoover	2–11			
1917–18	Lamar Hoover	3–10			
(Independent & Kansas Collegiate Athletic Conference) (1918–1919)
1918–19	No coach	1–7			
Kenneth Cassidy (Independent & Kansas Collegiate Athletic Conference) (1919–1920)
1919–20	Kenneth Cassidy	8–8	6–8		
Wilmer Elfrink (Independent & Kansas Collegiate Athletic Conference) (1920–1921)
1920–21	Wilmer Elfrink	16–2	15–2	1st	
Lamar Hoover (Independent & Kansas Collegiate Athletic Conference) (1921–1923)
1921–22	Lamar Hoover	12–4		2nd	
1922–23	Lamar Hoover	13–7			
Sam Hill (Independent & Kansas Collegiate Athletic Conference) (1923–1925)
1923–24	Sam Hill	10–12			
1924–25	Sam Hill	9–9		11th	
Leonard Umnus (Independent & Kansas Collegiate Athletic Conference) (1925–1927)
1925–26	Leonard Umnus	14–6		5th	
1926–27	Leonard Umnus	19–2		2nd	
Leonard Umnus (Central Intercollegiate Athletic Conference) (1927–1928)
1927–28	Leonard Umnus	14–6	8–4	3rd	
Gene Johnson (Central Intercollegiate Athletic Conference) (1928–1933)
1928–29	Gene Johnson	16–6	9–3	2nd	
1929–30	Gene Johnson	14–4	9–3	2nd	
1930–31	Gene Johnson	18–5	9–3	2nd	
1931–32	Gene Johnson	13–7	7–5	3rd	
1932–33	Gene Johnson	14–2	10–2	T–1st	
1933–34	none	program suspended			
Lindsay Austin (Central Intercollegiate Athletic Conference) (1934–1935)
1934–35	Lindsay Austin	7–14	4–4	T–3rd	
Bill Hennigh (Central Intercollegiate Athletic Conference) (1935–1940)
1935–36	Bill Hennigh	12–12	8–8	T–3rd	
1936–37	Bill Hennigh	9–12	5–7	4th	
1937–38	Bill Hennigh	10–13	5–7	T–3rd	
1938–39	Bill Hennigh	9–12	3–7	5th	
1939–40	Bill Hennigh	10–8	5–5	4th	
Bill Hennigh (Independent) (1940–1941)
1940–41	Bill Hennigh	9–11			
Jack Sterrett (Independent) (1941–1942)
1941–42	Jack Sterrett	4–16			
Mel Binford (Independent) (1942–1945)
1942–43	Mel Binford	12–7			
1943–44	No season	No games	WWII		
1944–45	Mel Binford	14–9			
Mel Binford (Missouri Valley Conference) (1945–1948)
1945–46	Mel Binford	14–9	6–4	2nd	
1946–47	Mel Binford	8–17	2–10	7th	
1947–48	Mel Binford	12–13	1–9	6th	
Ken Gunning (Missouri Valley Conference) (1948–1951)
1948–49	Ken Gunning	10–16	3–7	5th	
1949–50	Ken Gunning	7–17	1–11	7th	
1950–51	Ken Gunning	9–16	5–9	5th	
Ralph Miller (Missouri Valley Conference) (1951–1964)
1951–52	Ralph Miller	11–19	2–8	6th	
1952–53	Ralph Miller	16–11	3–7	6th	
1953–54	Ralph Miller	27–4	8–2	2nd	NIT first round
1954–55	Ralph Miller	17–9	4–6	4th	
1955–56	Ralph Miller	14–12	7–5	4th	
1956–57	Ralph Miller	15–11	8–6	T–3rd	
1957–58	Ralph Miller	14–12	6–8	5th	
1958–59	Ralph Miller	14–12	7–7	4th	
1959–60	Ralph Miller	14–12	6–8	T–4th	
1960–61	Ralph Miller	18–8	6–6	5th	
1961–62	Ralph Miller	18–9	7–5	3rd	NIT first round
1962–63	Ralph Miller	19–8	7–5	2nd	NIT quarterfinal
1963–64	Ralph Miller	23–6	10–2	T–1st	NCAA University Division Elite Eight
Gary Thompson (Missouri Valley Conference) (1964–1971)
1964–65	Gary Thompson	21–9	11–3	1st	NCAA University Division Fourth Place
1965–66	Gary Thompson	17–10	9–5	T–2nd	NIT first round
1966–67	Gary Thompson	14–12	9–5	3rd	
1967–68	Gary Thompson	12–14	7–9	6th	
1968–69	Gary Thompson	11–15	7–9	T–6th	
1969–70	Gary Thompson	8–18	3–13	8th	
1970–71	Gary Thompson	10–16	3–11	8th	
Harry Miller (Missouri Valley Conference) (1971–1978)
1971–72	Harry Miller	16–10	6–8	5th	
1972–73	Harry Miller	10–16	6–8	T–5th	
1973–74	Harry Miller	11–15	6–7	5th	
1974–75	Harry Miller	11–15	6–8	5th	
1975–76	Harry Miller	18–10	10–2	1st	NCAA Division I first round
1976–77	Harry Miller	18–10	7–5	T–3rd	
1977–78	Harry Miller	13–14	8–8	T–5th	
Gene Smithson (Missouri Valley Conference) (1978–1986)
1978–79	Gene Smithson	14–14	8–8	T–3rd	
1979–80	Gene Smithson	17–12	9–7	T–2nd	NIT first round
1980–81	Gene Smithson	27–7	12–4	1st	NCAA Division I Elite Eight
1981–82	Gene Smithson	23–6	12–4	T–2nd	Ineligible
1982–83	Gene Smithson	25–3	17–1	1st	Ineligible
1983–84	Gene Smithson	18–4	11–5	3rd	
1984–85	Gene Smithson	18–13	11–5	T–2nd	NCAA Division I first round
1985–86	Gene Smithson	14–14	7–9	T–5th	
Eddie Fogler (Missouri Valley Conference) (1986–1989)
1986–87	Eddie Fogler	22–11	9–5	3rd	NCAA Division I first round
1987–88	Eddie Fogler	20–10	11–3	2nd	NCAA Division I first round
1988–89	Eddie Fogler	19–11	10–4	T–2nd	NIT second round
Mike Cohen (Missouri Valley Conference) (1989–1992)
1989–90	Mike Cohen	10–19	6–8	T–5th	
1990–91	Mike Cohen	14–17	7–9	6th	
1991–92	Mike Cohen	8–20	6–12	T–7th	
Scott Thompson (Missouri Valley Conference) (1992–1996)
1992–93	Scott Thompson	10–17	7–11	T–7th	
1993–94	Scott Thompson	9–18	6–12	T–7th	
1994–95	Scott Thompson	13–14	6–12	8th	
1995–96	Scott Thompson	8–21	4–14	10th	
Randy Smithson (Missouri Valley Conference) (1996–2000)
1996–97	Randy Smithson	14–13	8–10	7th	
1997–98	Randy Smithson	16–15	11–7	3rd	
1998–99	Randy Smithson	13–17	6–12	T–8th	
1999–00	Randy Smithson	12–17	6–12	T–9th	
Mark Turgeon (Missouri Valley Conference) (2000–2007)
2000–01	Mark Turgeon	9–19	4–14	9th	
2001–02	Mark Turgeon	15–15	9–9	5th	
2002–03	Mark Turgeon	18–12	12–6	3rd	NIT Opening Round
2003–04	Mark Turgeon	21–11	12–6	T–2nd	NIT first round
2004–05	Mark Turgeon	22–10	12–6	2nd	NIT second round
2005–06	Mark Turgeon	26–9	14–4	1st	NCAA Division I Sweet Sixteen
2006–07	Mark Turgeon	17–14	8–10	6th	
Gregg Marshall (Missouri Valley Conference) (2007–2017)
2007–08	Gregg Marshall	11–20	4–14	9th	
2008–09	Gregg Marshall	17–17	8–10	5th	CBI second round
2009–10	Gregg Marshall	25–10	12–6	2nd	NIT first round
2010–11	Gregg Marshall	29–8	14–4	2nd	NIT Champion
2011–12	Gregg Marshall	27–6	16–2	1st	NCAA Division I second round
2012–13	Gregg Marshall	30–9	12–6	2nd	NCAA Division I Final Four
2013–14	Gregg Marshall	35–1	18–0	1st	NCAA Division I third round
2014–15	Gregg Marshall	30–4	17–1	1st	NCAA Division I Sweet Sixteen
2015–16	Gregg Marshall	26–9	16–2	1st	NCAA Division I second round
2016–17	Gregg Marshall	31–5	17–1	T–1st	NCAA Division I second round
Gregg Marshall (American Athletic Conference) (2017–2020)
2017–18	Gregg Marshall	25–8	14–4	T–2nd	NCAA Division I first round
2018–19	Gregg Marshall	22–15	10–8	6th	NIT semifinal
2019–20	Gregg Marshall	23–8	11–7	4th	No postseason held
Isaac Brown (American Athletic Conference) (2020–2023)
2020–21	Isaac Brown	16–6	11–2	1st	NCAA Division I First Four
2021–22	Isaac Brown	15–13	6–9	7th	
2022–23	Isaac Brown	17–15	9–9	6th	
Paul Mills (American Athletic Conference) (2023–present)
2023–24	Paul Mills	15–19	5–13	T–10th	
2024–25	Paul Mills	19–15	8–10	8th	NIT first round
2025–26	Paul Mills	24–12	13–5	T–2nd	NIT Quarterfinals
Total:		1,632–1,297			
National champion Postseason invitational champion Conference regular season champion Conference regular season and conference tournament champion Division regular season champion Division regular season and conference tournament champion Conference tournament champion
