= 1986–87 Kansas State Wildcats men's basketball team =

American college basketball season

1986–87 Kansas State Wildcats men's basketball

NCAA tournament, second round
- Conference: Big Eight Conference
- Record: 20–11 (8–6 Big Eight)
- Head coach: Lon Kruger (1st season)
- Assistant coaches: Dana Altman (1st season); Greg Grensing
- Home arena: Ahearn Field House

1986–87 Big Eight Conference men's basketball standings
	Conf.				Overall
Team	W		L	PCT	W		L	PCT
No. 14 Missouri †	11	–	3	.786	24	–	10	.706
No. 20 Kansas	9	–	5	.643	25	–	11	.694
Oklahoma	9	–	5	.643	24	–	10	.706
Kansas State	8	–	6	.571	20	–	11	.645
Nebraska	7	–	7	.500	21	–	12	.636
Iowa State	5	–	9	.357	13	–	15	.464
Oklahoma State	4	–	10	.286	8	–	20	.286
Colorado	3	–	11	.214	9	–	19	.321
† 1987 Big Eight tournament winner Rankings from AP poll

The 1986–87 Kansas State Wildcats men's basketball team represented Kansas State University as a member of the Big 8 Conference during the 1986-87 NCAA Division I men's basketball season. The head coach was Lon Kruger who was in his first of four years at the helm of his alma mater. The team played its home games in Ahearn Field House in Manhattan, Kansas. The Wildcats finished 4th in the Big 8 regular season standings and fell to conference champion Missouri in the semifinal round of the Big 8 Tournament. K-State received an at-large bid to the NCAA tournament as No. 9 seed in the West region. After an opening round win over Georgia in overtime, the Wildcats were beaten by eventual Final Four participant and No. 1 ranked UNLV in the round of 32.

== Roster ==
1986–87 Kansas State Wildcats men's basketball team
Players
Coaches

Pos.	#	Name	Height	Weight	Year	Hometown
G	11	Lynn Smith	5 ft 11 in (1.8 m)	175 lb (79 kg)	Sr	Memphis, Tennessee
G	12	Steve Henson	5 ft 11 in (1.8 m)	170 lb (77 kg)	Fr	McPherson, Kansas
G	23	Mitch Richmond	6 ft 5 in (1.96 m)	210 lb (95 kg)	Jr	Fort Lauderdale, Florida

Head coach

- Lon Kruger (Kansas State)

Assistant coach(es)

- Dana Altman (Eastern New Mexico)

Legend

- (C) Team captain
- (S) Suspended
- (I) Ineligible
- (W) Walk-on
- Injured
- Current redshirt

Roster

== Schedule ==
Date time, TV	Rank^{#}	Opponent^{#}	Result	Record	Site city, state
Regular Season
Nov 29, 1986*		South Dakota	W 95–45	1–0	Ahearn Field House; Manhattan, Kansas
Dec 1, 1986*		Grand Canyon	W 93–57	2–0	Ahearn Field House; Manhattan, Kansas
Dec 4, 1986*		at Texas Tech	W 73–72	3–0	Lubbock Municipal Coliseum; Lubbock, Texas
Dec 6, 1986*		Texas State	W 98–83	4–0	Ahearn Field House; Manhattan, Kansas
Dec 9, 1986*		Creighton	W 81–64	5–0	Ahearn Field House; Manhattan, Kansas
Dec 11, 1986*		Abilene Christian	W 90–67	6–0	Ahearn Field House; Manhattan, Kansas
Dec 13, 1986*		at Wichita State	L 60–63	6–1	Levitt Arena; Wichita, Kansas
Dec 19, 1986*		vs. Illinois State; Music City Invitational	W 87–86	7–1	Memorial Gymnasium; Nashville, Tennessee
Dec 20, 1986*		at Vanderbilt; Music City Invitational	L 72–79	7–2	Memorial Gymnasium; Nashville, Tennessee
Dec 23, 1986*		at Northern Illinois	W 81–79	8–2	Rockford MetroCentre; Rockford, Illinois
Dec 27, 1986*		vs. No. 4 North Carolina	L 62–81	8–3	Kemper Arena; Kansas City, Missouri
Jan 7, 1987*		at Marquette	W 85–84	9–3	MECCA Arena; Milwaukee, Wisconsin
Jan 10, 1987		Nebraska	W 114–82	10–3 (1–0)	Ahearn Field House; Manhattan, Kansas
Jan 12, 1987*		Wichita State	W 79–67	11–3	Ahearn Field House; Manhattan, Kansas
Jan 17, 1987		Iowa State	W 68–65	12–3 (2–0)	Ahearn Field House; Manhattan, Kansas
Jan 21, 1987		at Colorado	W 92–61	13–3 (3–0)	Coors Events Center; Boulder, Colorado
Jan 24, 1987		No. 11 Oklahoma	L 78–81	13–4 (3–1)	Ahearn Field House; Manhattan, Kansas
Jan 28, 1987		at Oklahoma State	W 88–77	14–4 (4–1)	Gallagher-Iba Arena; Stillwater, Oklahoma
Feb 1, 1987		at Missouri	L 64–68	14–5 (4–2)	Hearnes Center; Columbia, Missouri
Feb 4, 1987		No. 18 Kansas	L 75–80 ^{2OT}	14–6 (4–3)	Ahearn Field House; Columbia, Missouri
Feb 7, 1987		at Iowa State	W 87–75	15–6 (5–3)	Hilton Coliseum; Ames, Iowa
Feb 11, 1987		at Colorado	W 74–56	16–6 (6–3)	Coors Events Center; Boulder, Colorado
Feb 14, 1987		at Nebraska	L 76–78	16–7 (6–4)	Bob Devaney Sports Center; Lincoln, Nebraska
Feb 17, 1987		Oklahoma State	W 81–60	17–7 (7–4)	Ahearn Field House; Columbia, Missouri
Feb 19, 1987		at No. 15 Kansas	L 67–84	17–8 (7–5)	Allen Fieldhouse; Lawrence, Kansas
Feb 25, 1987		Missouri	L 75–80	17–9 (7–6)	Ahearn Field House; Columbia, Missouri
Feb 27, 1987		at No. 12 Oklahoma	W 90–89	18–9 (8–6)	Lloyd Noble Center; Norman, Oklahoma
Big 8 Tournament
Mar 6, 1987*		vs. Nebraska; Quarterfinals	W 47–45	19–9	Kemper Arena; Kansas City, Missouri
Mar 7, 1987*		vs. No. 19 Missouri; Semifinals	L 69–72	19–10	Kemper Arena; Kansas City, Missouri
NCAA Tournament
Mar 12, 1987*	(9 W)	vs. (8 W) Georgia; First round	W 82–79 ^{OT}	20–10	Jon M. Huntsman Center; Salt Lake City, Utah
Mar 14, 1987*	(9 W)	vs. (1 W) No. 1 UNLV; Second round	L 61–80	20–11	Jon M. Huntsman Center; Salt Lake City, Utah
*Non-conference game. ^{#}Rankings from AP Poll. (#) Tournament seedings in parentheses.
