= 1986–87 Oklahoma Sooners men's basketball team =

American college basketball season

1986–87 Oklahoma Sooners men's basketball

NCAA men's Division I tournament, Sweet Sixteen
- Conference: Big Eight Conference

Ranking
- Coaches: No. 20
- Record: 24–10 (9–5 Big Eight)
- Head coach: Billy Tubbs (7th season)
- Assistant coaches: Mike Mims; Jim Kerwin (3rd season); Mike Anderson
- Home arena: Lloyd Noble Center (Capacity: 10,871)

1986–87 Big Eight Conference men's basketball standings
	Conf.				Overall
Team	W		L	PCT	W		L	PCT
No. 14 Missouri †	11	–	3	.786	24	–	10	.706
No. 20 Kansas	9	–	5	.643	25	–	11	.694
Oklahoma	9	–	5	.643	24	–	10	.706
Kansas State	8	–	6	.571	20	–	11	.645
Nebraska	7	–	7	.500	21	–	12	.636
Iowa State	5	–	9	.357	13	–	15	.464
Oklahoma State	4	–	10	.286	8	–	20	.286
Colorado	3	–	11	.214	9	–	19	.321
† 1987 Big Eight tournament winner Rankings from AP poll

The 1986–87 Oklahoma Sooners men's basketball team represented the University of Oklahoma in competitive college basketball during the 1986–87 NCAA Division I men's basketball season. The Oklahoma Sooners men's basketball team played its home games in the Lloyd Noble Center and was a member of the National Collegiate Athletic Association's (NCAA) former Big Eight Conference at that time.

After receiving a preseason top 10 ranking, the team posted a 24–10 overall record and a 9–5 conference record. Battle tested, the Sooners received a bid to the 1987 NCAA Tournament, and advanced to the Sweet Sixteen where they fell to Iowa in overtime.

== Roster ==
1986–87 Oklahoma Sooners men's basketball team
Players
Coaches

Pos.	#	Name	Height	Weight	Year	Previous school	Hometown
F	21	Mike Bell	6 ft 5 in (1.96 m)	201 lb (91 kg)	So	Robert E. Lee	Montgomery, AL
G	23	Chris Durley	6 ft 3 in (1.91 m)	210 lb (95 kg)	So	Douglass	Oklahoma City, OK
G	14	Ricky Grace	6 ft 1 in (1.85 m)	172 lb (78 kg)	Jr	Wilmer–Hutchins	Dallas, TX
F	25	Harvey Grant	6 ft 8 in (2.03 m)	200 lb (91 kg)	Jr	Independence CC	Sparta, GA
F/C	55	David Johnson	6 ft 7 in (2.01 m)	265 lb (120 kg)	Sr	Wyandotte	Kansas City, KS
F	22	Tyrone Jones	6 ft 5 in (1.96 m)	215 lb (98 kg)	So	Dunbar	Washington, D.C.
F	30	Darryl Kennedy	6 ft 5 in (1.96 m)	224 lb (102 kg)	Sr	NW Classen	Oklahoma City, OK
C	33	Stacey King	6 ft 10 in (2.08 m)	229 lb (104 kg)	So	Lawton	Lawton, OK
G	32	Tim McCalister	6 ft 3 in (1.91 m)	203 lb (92 kg)	Sr	West Side	Gary, IN
G	24	Terrence Mullins (redshirt)	6 ft 2 in (1.88 m)	198 lb (90 kg)	Fr	Riordan	San Francisco, CA
G	20	Art Pollard	6 ft 2 in (1.88 m)	184 lb (83 kg)	So	Roosevelt	East Chicago, IN
F	44	Dave Sieger	6 ft 5 in (1.96 m)	207 lb (94 kg)	Jr	San Gorgonio	San Bernardino, CA
F	32	Andre Wiley	6 ft 5 in (1.96 m)	197 lb (89 kg)	So	Southwestern	Flint, MI

Head coach

- Billy Tubbs

Assistant coach(es)

- Mike Mims
- Jim Kerwin
- Mike Anderson

Legend

- (C) Team captain
- (S) Suspended
- (I) Ineligible
- (W) Walk-on
- Injured
- Current redshirt

Roster

== Schedule ==
Date time, TV	Rank^{#}	Opponent^{#}	Result	Record	Site (attendance) city, state
Non-conference regular season
Nov 21, 1986*	No. 7	Brigham Young; Preseason NIT	W 119–110	1–0	Lloyd Noble Center; Norman, Oklahoma
Nov 24, 1986*	No. 7	at No. 5 UNLV; Preseason NIT	L 81–90	1–1	Thomas & Mack Center (14,836); Las Vegas, Nevada
Dec 2, 1986*	No. 11	Texas A&M	W 93–79	2–1	Lloyd Noble Center; Norman, Oklahoma
Dec 6, 1986*	No. 11	Texas-Arlington	W 101–76	3–1	Lloyd Noble Center; Norman, Oklahoma
Dec 10, 1986*	No. 9	at Texas	W 84–65	4–1	Frank Erwin Center; Austin, Texas
Dec 13, 1986*	No. 9	Florida State	W 109–92	5–1	Lloyd Noble Center; Norman, Oklahoma
Dec 20, 1986*	No. 7	Colorado State	W 108–62	6–1	Lloyd Noble Center; Norman, Oklahoma
Dec 26, 1986*	No. 6	vs. Creighton; All-College Tournament	W 106–90	7–1	Myriad Convention Center; Oklahoma City, Oklahoma
Dec 27, 1986*	No. 6	vs. TCU; All-College Tournament	L 82–95	7–2	Myriad Convention Center; Oklahoma City, Oklahoma
Jan 2, 1987*	No. 13	Arkansas State; Sooner Invitational	W 77–57	8–2	Lloyd Noble Center; Norman, Oklahoma
Jan 3, 1987*	No. 13	McNeese State; Sooner Invitational	W 68–63	9–2	Lloyd Noble Center; Norman, Oklahoma
Big 8 Regular season
Jan 10, 1987	No. 11	at Missouri	L 83–87	9–3 (0–1)	Hearnes Center; Columbia, Missouri
Jan 12, 1987*	No. 11	vs. Louisiana State	W 94–85	10–3	Myriad Convention Center; Oklahoma City, Oklahoma
Jan 15, 1987	No. 16	No. 20 Kansas	W 76–74	11–3 (1–1)	Lloyd Noble Center; Norman, Oklahoma
Jan 17, 1987*	No. 16	No. 1 UNLV	W 89–88	12–3	Lloyd Noble Center; Norman, Oklahoma
Jan 21, 1987	No. 11	Oklahoma State	W 94–67	13–3 (2–1)	Lloyd Noble Center; Norman, Oklahoma
Jan 24, 1987	No. 11	at Kansas State	W 81–78	14–3 (3–1)	Ahearn Field House; Manhattan, Kansas
Jan 27, 1987	No. 10	at Colorado	W 87–62	15–3 (4–1)	CU Events/Conference Center; Boulder, Colorado
Jan 29, 1987	No. 10	Iowa State	W 82–76	16–3 (5–1)	Lloyd Noble Center; Norman, Oklahoma
Jan 31, 1987*	No. 10	at North Carolina State	W 86–82	17–3	Reynolds Coliseum; Raleigh, North Carolina
Feb 4, 1987	No. 8	at Nebraska	W 80–66	18–3 (6–1)	Bob Devaney Sports Center; Lincoln, Nebraska
Feb 7, 1987*	No. 8	Missouri	W 81–78	19–3 (7–1)	Lloyd Noble Center; Norman, Oklahoma
Feb 11, 1987	No. 8	at Oklahoma State	L 74–75	19–4 (7–2)	Gallagher-Iba Arena; Stillwater, Oklahoma
Feb 14, 1987	No. 8	at No. 17 Kansas	L 84–86	19–5 (7–3)	Allen Fieldhouse; Lawrence, Kansas
Feb 18, 1987	No. 13	Colorado	W 108–84	20–5 (8–3)	Lloyd Noble Center; Norman, Oklahoma
Feb 21, 1987	No. 13	Nebraska	W 133–97	21–5 (9–3)	Lloyd Noble Center; Norman, Oklahoma
Feb 24, 1987	No. 12	at Iowa State	L 84–86	21–6 (9–4)	Hilton Coliseum; Ames, Iowa
Feb 27, 1987	No. 12	Kansas State	L 89–90	21–7 (9–5)	Lloyd Noble Center; Norman, Oklahoma
Mar 1, 1987*	No. 12	at Kentucky	L 74–75	21–8	Rupp Arena; Lexington, Kentucky
Big 8 Tournament
Mar 6, 1987*	(3) No. 17	vs. (6) Iowa State; Quarterfinal	W 83–73	22–8	Kemper Arena; Kansas City, Missouri
Mar 7, 1987*	(3) No. 17	vs. (2) Kansas; Semifinal	L 77–82	22–9	Kemper Arena; Kansas City, Missouri
NCAA Tournament
Mar 13, 1987*	(6 W)	vs. (11 W) Tulsa; First round	W 74–69	23–9	McKale Center; Tucson, Arizona
Mar 15, 1987*	(6 W)	vs. (3 W) No. 12 Pittsburgh; Second Round	W 96–93	24–9	McKale Center; Tucson, Arizona
Mar 20, 1987*; CBS	(6 W)	vs. (2 W) No. 6 Iowa; West Regional semifinal – Sweet Sixteen	L 91–93 ^{OT}	24–10	Kingdome (22,914); Seattle, Washington
*Non-conference game. ^{#}Rankings from AP Poll. (#) Tournament seedings in parentheses. All times are in Central Time. (#) during NCAA Tournament is seed within region W=West.

== After the season ==
=== NBA draft ===
The following Sooners were drafted in the 1987 NBA draft.

Round	Pick	Player	Position	NBA club
3	47	Tim McCalister	Guard	Los Angeles Clippers
4	89	David Johnson	Forward	Dallas Mavericks
4	91	Daryl Kennedy	Forward	Boston Celtics
