= 1986–87 Iowa State Cyclones men's basketball team =

American college basketball season

1986–87 Iowa State Cyclones men's basketball
- Conference: Big Eight Conference
- Record: 13–15 (5–9 Big Eight)
- Head coach: Johnny Orr (7th season)
- Assistant coach: Steve Antrim
- Home arena: Hilton Coliseum

1986–87 Big Eight Conference men's basketball standings
	Conf.				Overall
Team	W		L	PCT	W		L	PCT
No. 14 Missouri †	11	–	3	.786	24	–	10	.706
No. 20 Kansas	9	–	5	.643	25	–	11	.694
Oklahoma	9	–	5	.643	24	–	10	.706
Kansas State	8	–	6	.571	20	–	11	.645
Nebraska	7	–	7	.500	21	–	12	.636
Iowa State	5	–	9	.357	13	–	15	.464
Oklahoma State	4	–	10	.286	8	–	20	.286
Colorado	3	–	11	.214	9	–	19	.321
† 1987 Big Eight tournament winner Rankings from AP poll

The 1986–87 Iowa State Cyclones men's basketball team represented Iowa State University during the 1986–87 NCAA Division I men's basketball season. The Cyclones were coached by Johnny Orr, who was in his 7th season. They played their home games at Hilton Coliseum in Ames, Iowa.

They finished the season 13–15, 5–9 in Big Eight play to finish in 7th place.

== Roster ==
1986–87 Iowa State Cyclones men's basketball team
Players
Coaches

Pos.	#	Name	Height	Weight	Year	Hometown
G	44	Jeff Grayer (C)	6 ft 5 in (1.96 m)	—	Jr	Flint, Michigan
F		Tom Schafer	6 ft 7 in (2.01 m)	—
C	33	Sam Hill (C)	6 ft 9 in (2.06 m)	—	Sr
F		Elmer Robinson	6 ft 5 in (1.96 m)	—	So
G		Gary Thompkins	6 ft 3 in (1.91 m)	—	Jr
G		Terry Woods	5 ft 9 in (1.75 m)	—	Fr
G		Marc Urquhart	6 ft 4 in (1.93 m)	—	So
C		Darryl Spinks	6 ft 8 in (2.03 m)	—
F	5	Lafester Rhodes	6 ft 8 in (2.03 m)	—	Jr
G		Maurice Poole	6 ft 1 in (1.85 m)	—
F		Adrian Moore	6 ft 4 in (1.93 m)	—	Fr
G		Matt Margenthaler	6 ft 3 in (1.91 m)	—
F		Paul Doerrfeld	6 ft 7 in (2.01 m)	—	Fr
C		Bryan Heger	6 ft 9 in (2.06 m)	—	Fr

Head coach

- Johnny Orr (Beloit)

Assistant coach(es)

- Steve Antrim

Legend

- (C) Team captain
- (S) Suspended
- (I) Ineligible
- (W) Walk-on
- Injured
- Current redshirt

== Schedule and results ==
Date time, TV	Rank^{#}	Opponent^{#}	Result	Record	Site city, state
Exhibition
November 22, 1986*; 7:00 pm		Bulgaria; Exhibition	W 94–87		Hilton Coliseum; Ames, Iowa
Regular season
November 30, 1986*; 1:08 pm, Cyclone Television Network		Detroit Mercy	W 91–66	1–0	Hilton Coliseum; Ames, Iowa
December 2, 1986*; 7:35 pm		at Creighton	L 65–80	1–1	Omaha Civic Auditorium (8,995); Omaha, Nebraska
December 4, 1986*; 7:00 pm		Wisconsin-Green Bay	W 74–57	2–1	Hilton Coliseum; Ames, Iowa
December 6, 1986*; 1:08 pm, Cyclone Television Network		Drake; Iowa Big Four	W 55–51	3–1	Hilton Coliseum; Ames, Iowa
December 11, 1986*; 7:08 pm, Cyclone Television Network		Northern Iowa; Iowa Big Four	W 79–60	4–1	Hilton Coliseum; Ames, Iowa
December 13, 1986*; 7:00 pm, Cyclone Television Network		at Michigan State	L 85–86	4–2	Jenison Field House; East Lansing, Michigan
December 20, 1986*; 7:05 pm, Iowa Television Network		at No. 3 Iowa	L 64–89	4–3	Carver–Hawkeye Arena (15,500); Iowa City, Iowa
December 22, 1986*; 7:05 pm		Florida International	W 98–61	5–3	Hilton Coliseum; Ames, Iowa
December 29, 1986*; 10:00 pm		vs. No. 5 Auburn; Sun Bowl Classic	L 87–89	5–4	Special Events Center (11,512); El Paso, Texas
December 29, 1986*; 8:00 pm		vs. Texas; Sun Bowl Classic	W 58–57	6–4	Special Events Center (12,222); El Paso, Texas
January 3, 1987*; 1:08 pm, Cyclone Television Network		Illinois State	L 59–61	6–5	Hilton Coliseum; Ames, Iowa
January 5, 1987*; 7:05 pm		Texas–Arlington	W 103–73	7–5	Hilton Coliseum; Ames, Iowa
January 7, 1987*; 7:05 pm		Dayton	W 72–62	8–5	Hilton Coliseum; Ames, Iowa
January 14, 1987; 7:05 pm		Colorado	W 66–52	9–5 (1–0)	Hilton Coliseum; Ames, Iowa
January 17, 1987; 3:10 pm, Big Eight		at Kansas State	L 65–68	9–6 (1–1)	Ahearn Fieldhouse (10,025); Manhattan, Kansas
January 20, 1987; 7:00 pm, Big Eight		Nebraska	W 91–75	10–6 (2–1)	Hilton Coliseum; Ames, Iowa
January 24, 1987; 1:10 pm, Big Eight		Oklahoma State	L 71–73	10–7 (2–2)	Hilton Coliseum; Ames, Iowa
January 27, 1987; 8:05 pm, Score		at No. 20 Kansas	L 48–72	10–8 (2–3)	Allen Fieldhouse (15,600); Lawrence, Kansas
January 29, 1987; 7:30 pm, Closed Circuit (Iowa)		at No. 10 Oklahoma	L 76–82	10–9 (2–4)	Lloyd Noble Center; Norman, Oklahoma
February 4, 1987; 7:08 pm, Score		No. 10 Missouri	W 96–92	11–9 (3–4)	Hilton Coliseum; Ames, Iowa
February 7, 1987; 3:08 pm, Big Eight/Raycom		Kansas State	L 75–87	11–10 (3–5)	Hilton Coliseum; Ames, Iowa
February 11, 1987; 7:35 pm, Score		at Nebraska	L 65–66	11–11 (3–6)	Devaney Sports Center; Lincoln, Nebraska
February 14, 1987; 3:10 pm, Raycom		at Colorado	L 74–77	11–12 (3–7)	Coors Events Center; Boulder, Colorado
February 17, 1987; 7:00 pm, USA		No. 15 Kansas	W 95–86	12–12 (4–7)	Hilton Coliseum; Ames, Iowa
February 21, 1987; 1:10 pm, Cyclone Television Network		Oklahoma State	L 64–76	12–13 (4–8)	Gallagher-Iba Arena; Stillwater, Oklahoma
February 24, 1987; 7:00 pm, Cyclone Television Network		No. 12 Oklahoma	W 86–84	13–13 (5–8)	Hilton Coliseum (14,250); Ames, Iowa
February 28, 1987; 1:10 pm, Raycom		at Missouri	L 77–85	13–14 (5–9)	Hearnes Center; Columbia, Missouri
Big Eight tournament
March 6, 1987; 8:10 pm, Raycom		vs. No. 17 Oklahoma; Big Eight tournament Quarterfinal	L 73–83	13–15	Kemper Arena; Kansas City, Missouri
*Non-conference game. ^{#}Rankings from AP poll. (#) Tournament seedings in parentheses. All times are in Central Time.
