= 1986–87 Kansas Jayhawks men's basketball team =

American college basketball season

1986–87 Kansas Jayhawks men's basketball

NCAA men's Division I tournament, Sweet Sixteen
- Conference: Big 8 Conference

Ranking
- AP: No. 20
- Record: 25–11 (9–5 Big 8)
- Head coach: Larry Brown (4th season)
- Assistant coaches: Gregg Popovich (1st season); R. C. Buford (4th season); Alvin Gentry (1st season); Ed Manning (4th season); John Robic (1st season)
- Captains: Cedric Hunter; Mark Turgeon
- Home arena: Allen Fieldhouse

1986–87 Big Eight Conference men's basketball standings
	Conf.				Overall
Team	W		L	PCT	W		L	PCT
No. 14 Missouri †	11	–	3	.786	24	–	10	.706
No. 20 Kansas	9	–	5	.643	25	–	11	.694
Oklahoma	9	–	5	.643	24	–	10	.706
Kansas State	8	–	6	.571	20	–	11	.645
Nebraska	7	–	7	.500	21	–	12	.636
Iowa State	5	–	9	.357	13	–	15	.464
Oklahoma State	4	–	10	.286	8	–	20	.286
Colorado	3	–	11	.214	9	–	19	.321
† 1987 Big Eight tournament winner Rankings from AP poll

The 1986–87 Kansas Jayhawks men's basketball team represented the University of Kansas for the NCAA Division I men's intercollegiate basketball season of 1986–87. They were led by Larry Brown in his fourth season as head coach. The team played its home games in Allen Fieldhouse in Lawrence, Kansas.

== Roster ==
1986–87 Kansas Jayhawks men's basketball team
Players
Coaches

Pos.	#	Name	Height	Weight	Year	Previous school	Hometown
F	4	Robert Coyne	6 ft 8 in (2.03 m)	180 lb (82 kg)	Fr		Denver, Colorado
G	10	Scooter Barry	6 ft 2 in (1.88 m)	165 lb (75 kg)	So	De La Salle	Concord, California
G	11	Mark Turgeon	5 ft 10 in (1.78 m)	150 lb (68 kg)	Sr	Hayden	Topeka, Kansas
G	14	Kevin Pritchard	6 ft 3 in (1.91 m)	170 lb (77 kg)	Fr	Edison	Tulsa, Oklahoma
G/F	21	Milt Newton	6 ft 4 in (1.93 m)	180 lb (82 kg)	So	Coolidge	Washington, D.C.
G	22	Cedric Hunter	6 ft 0 in (1.83 m)	180 lb (82 kg)	Sr	Omaha South	Omaha, Nebraska
F	23	Archie Marshall (injured)	6 ft 6 in (1.98 m)	185 lb (84 kg)	RS Sr	Edison	Tulsa, Oklahoma
F	24	Chris Piper	6 ft 8 in (2.03 m)	195 lb (88 kg)	RS Jr	Lawrence	Lawrence, Kansas
F/C	25	Danny Manning	6 ft 10 in (2.08 m)	255 lb (116 kg)	Jr	Lawrence	Lawrence, Kansas
G	33	Jeff Gueldner	6 ft 5 in (1.96 m)	170 lb (77 kg)	Fr	Charleston	Charleston, Illinois
C	40	Mark Pellock	6 ft 9 in (2.06 m)	220 lb (100 kg)	So	Parsons	Parsons, Kansas
F	42	Mark Randall	6 ft 9 in (2.06 m)	200 lb (91 kg)	Fr	Cherry Creek	Englewood, Colorado
F	44	Keith Harris	6 ft 5 in (1.96 m)	195 lb (88 kg)	Fr	Santa Monica	Santa Monica, California
C	52	Sean Alvarado	6 ft 10 in (2.08 m)	210 lb (95 kg)	Jr	Dunbar	Washington, D.C.

Head coach

- Larry Brown

Assistant coach(es)

Legend

- (C) Team captain
- (S) Suspended
- (I) Ineligible
- (W) Walk-on
- Injured
- Current redshirt

Roster

== Schedule ==
Date time, TV	Rank^{#}	Opponent^{#}	Result	Record	Site city, state
Regular season
1986/11/29*	No. 8	Tennessee-Martin	W 88-69	1–0	Allen Fieldhouse; Lawrence, Kansas
1986/12/01*	No. 8	Southern	W 87-69	2-0	Allen Fieldhouse; Lawrence, Kansas
1986/12/04*	No. 6	Washington	W 82-68	3-0	Allen Fieldhouse; Lawrence, Kansas
1986/12/06*	No. 6	at Arkansas	L 86-103	3-1	Barnhill Arena; Fayetteville, Arkansas
1986/12/13	No. 14	Colorado	W 59-56	4-1 (1–0)	Allen Fieldhouse; Lawrence, Kansas
1986/12/19*	No. 13	Texas Tech	W 59-56	5-1	Allen Fieldhouse; Lawrence, Kansas
1986/12/22*	No. 13	The Citadel	W 74-71	6-1	Allen Fieldhouse; Lawrence, Kansas
1986/12/27*	No. 13	vs. No. 14 Pittsburgh; Rainbow Classic First Round	L 76-79	6–2	Neal S. Blaisdell Center; Honolulu, Hawaii
1986/12/28*	No. 13	vs. Ohio State; Rainbow Classic Loser's Bracket	L 78-79 ^{OT}	6-3	Neal S. Blaisdell Center; Honolulu, Hawaii
1986/12/29*	No. 14	vs. Hawaii; Rainbow Classic Seventh Place Game	W 81-80 ^{OT}	7-3	Neal S. Blaisdell Center; Honolulu, Hawaii
1987/01/05*	No. 12	at Wichita State	L 49-54	7-4	Levitt Arena; Wichita, Kansas
1987/01/08*	No. 19	No. 8 Temple	W 67–64	8-4	Allen Fieldhouse; Lawrence, Kansas
1987/01/11	No. 19	at Oklahoma State	W 66-63	9-4 (2–0)	Gallagher-Iba Arena; Stillwater, Oklahoma
1987/01/15	No. 20	at No. 16 Oklahoma	L 74-76	9-5 (2–1)	Lloyd Noble Center; Norman, Oklahoma
1987/01/17*	No. 20	No. 14 Miami	W 82-47	10-5	Allen Fieldhouse; Lawrence, Kansas
1987/01/21		Missouri; Border War	W 71-70	11-5 (3–1)	Allen Fieldhouse; Lawrence, Kansas
1987/01/22		Nebraska	W 86-65	12–5 (4–1)	Allen Fieldhouse; Lawrence, Kansas
1987/01/25*		vs. No. 20 NC State	W 74-60	13-5	Kemper Arena; Kansas City, Missouri
1987/01/27	No. 20	Iowa State	W 72-48	14-5 (5–1)	Allen Fieldhouse; Lawrence, Kansas
1987/01/31*	No. 20	at Louisville	W 62-58	15-5	Freedom Hall; Louisville, Kentucky
1987/02/04	No. 18	at Kansas State; Sunflower Showdown	W 80-75 ^{2OT}	16-5 (6–1)	Ahearn Field House; Manhattan, Kansas
1987/02/07	No. 18	Oklahoma State	W 88-63	17-5 (7–1)	Allen Fieldhouse; Lawrence, Kansas
1987/02/08*	No. 18	Notre Dame	W 70-60	18-5	Allen Fieldhouse; Lawrence, Kansas
1987/02/11	No. 17	at Missouri; Border War	L 60-63	18-6 (7–2)	Hearnes Center; Columbia, Missouri
1987/02/14	No. 17	No. 8 Oklahoma	W 86-84	19-6 (8–2)	Allen Fieldhouse; Lawrence, Kansas
1987/02/17	No. 15	at Iowa State	L 86-95	19-7 (8–3)	Hilton Coliseum; Ames, Iowa
1987/02/19	No. 15	Kansas State; Sunflower Showdown	W 84-67	20-7 (9–3)	Allen Fieldhouse; Lawrence, Kansas
1987/02/21*	No. 15	at No. 20 St. John's	W 62-60	21-7	Madison Square Garden; New York, New York
1987/02/24	No. 16	at Colorado	L 56-66	21-8 (9–4)	Coors Events Center; Boulder, Colorado
1987/02/28	No. 16	at Nebraska	L 81-83 ^{OT}	21-9 (9–5)	Bob Devaney Sports Center; Lincoln, Nebraska
Big 8 Tournament
1987/03/06		vs. Oklahoma State; Quarterfinals	W 67-58	22-9	Kemper Arena; Kansas City, Missouri
1987/03/07		vs. No. 17 Oklahoma; Semifinals	W 82-77	23-9	Kemper Arena; Kansas City, Missouri
1987/03/08		vs. No. 19 Missouri; Border War; Championship Game	L 65-67	23-10	Kemper Arena; Kansas City, Missouri
NCAA Tournament
1987/03/13*	(5 SE) No. 20	vs. (12 SE) Houston; First Round	W 66-55	24-10	Omni Coliseum; Atlanta, Georgia
1987/03/15*	(5 SE) No. 20	vs. (13 SE) Southwest Missouri State; Second Round	W 67-63	25-10	Omni Coliseum; Atlanta, Georgia
1987/03/19*	(5 SE) No. 20	vs. (1 SE) No. 4 Georgetown; Sweet Sixteen	L 57–70	25–11	Freedom Hall; Louisville, Kentucky
*Non-conference game. ^{#}Rankings from AP Poll. (#) Tournament seedings in parentheses.

== Rankings ==
Poll	Pre	Wk 1	Wk 2	Wk 3	Wk 4	Wk 5	Wk 6	Wk 7	Wk 8	Wk 9	Wk 10	Wk 11	Wk 12	Wk 13	Wk 14	Final
AP	8	6	14	13	13	12	19	20	NR	20	18	17	15	16	NR	20
