= 1986–87 UNLV Runnin' Rebels basketball team =

American college basketball season

1986–87 UNLV Runnin' Rebels basketball

NCAA Division I regular season champions PCAA tournament champions PCAA Regular Season Champions Preseason NIT champions

NCAA men's Division I tournament, Final Four
- Conference: Pacific Coast Athletic Association

Ranking
- Coaches: No. 1
- AP: No. 1
- Record: 37–2 (18–0 PCAA)
- Head coach: Jerry Tarkanian (14th season)
- Assistant coaches: Tim Grgurich; Mark Warkentien; Ralph Readout
- Home arena: Thomas & Mack Center

1986–87 PCAA men's basketball standings
	Conf.				Overall
Team	W		L	PCT	W		L	PCT
No. 1 UNLV †	18	–	0	1.000	37	–	2	.949
UC Santa Barbara	10	–	8	.556	16	–	12	.571
San Jose State	10	–	8	.556	16	–	14	.533
Cal State Fullerton	9	–	9	.500	17	–	13	.567
New Mexico State	9	–	9	.500	15	–	15	.500
UC Irvine	9	–	9	.500	14	–	14	.500
Utah State	8	–	10	.444	15	–	16	.484
Long Beach State	7	–	11	.389	10	–	17	.370
Pacific	6	–	12	.333	10	–	17	.370
Fresno State	4	–	14	.222	9	–	20	.310
† 1987 PCAA tournament winner Rankings from AP poll

The 1986–87 UNLV Runnin' Rebels basketball team represented the University of Nevada Las Vegas in NCAA Division I men's competition in the 1986–87 season under head coach Jerry Tarkanian. The team played its home games in the Thomas & Mack Center, and was a member of the Pacific Coast Athletic Association (PCAA), now known as the Big West Conference; it would join the Western Athletic Conference in 1996 and become a charter member of its current conference, the Mountain West Conference, in 1999.

The nickname "Runnin' Rebels" is unique to men's basketball at UNLV. The default nickname for men's sports teams at the school is simply "Rebels", while all women's teams are known as "Lady Rebels".

== Roster ==
1986–87 UNLV Runnin' Rebels men's basketball team
Players
Coaches

Pos.	#	Name	Height	Weight	Year	Hometown
C	00	Richard Robinson	6 ft 10 in (2.08 m)	205 lb (93 kg)	Jr	Granada Hills, California
G/F	3	Lawrence West	6 ft 7 in (2.01 m)	205 lb (93 kg)	Jr	San Diego, California
G	10	Mark Wade	6 ft 0 in (1.83 m)	160 lb (73 kg)	Sr	San Pedro, California
G	13	Freddie Banks	6 ft 2 in (1.88 m)	155 lb (70 kg)	Sr	Las Vegas, Nevada
F	23	Gerald Paddio	6 ft 8 in (2.03 m)	195 lb (88 kg)	Jr	Rayne, Louisiana
F	30	Leon Symanski	6 ft 7 in (2.01 m)	210 lb (95 kg)	Sr	Orange, California
G	31	Stacey Cvijanovich	6 ft 3 in (1.91 m)	185 lb (84 kg)	Fr	Oxnard, California
G	32	Gary Graham	6 ft 4 in (1.93 m)	185 lb (84 kg)	Sr	Baltimore, Maryland
G/F	33	Eldridge Hudson	6 ft 6 in (1.98 m)	215 lb (98 kg)	Sr	Carson, California
F/C	35	Armon Gilliam	6 ft 9 in (2.06 m)	230 lb (104 kg)	Sr	Pittsburgh, Pennsylvania
C	40	David Willard	6 ft 11 in (2.11 m)	195 lb (88 kg)	So	San Diego, California
F	44	Jarvis Basnight	6 ft 8 in (2.03 m)	190 lb (86 kg)	Jr	Detroit, Michigan

Head coach

- Jerry Tarkanian (Fresno State)

Assistant coach(es)

- Tim Grgurich (Pittsburgh)
- Mark Warkentien (Cal State Fullerton)
- Ralph Readout (Ohio)

Legend

- (C) Team captain
- (S) Suspended
- (I) Ineligible
- (W) Walk-on
- Injured
- Current redshirt

Roster
Last update: 2019-Mar-16

== Schedule and results ==
Date time, TV	Rank^{#}	Opponent^{#}	Result	Record	High points	High rebounds	High assists	Site (attendance) city, state
Regular season
11/21/1986*	No. 5	No. 19 Arizona; Preseason NIT	W 92–87	1–0	–	–	–	Thomas & Mack Center (15,065); Las Vegas, NV
11/24/1986*	No. 5	No. 7 Oklahoma; Preseason NIT	W 90–81	2–0	–	–	–	Thomas & Mack Center (14,836); Las Vegas, NV
11/28/1986*	No. 5	vs. Temple; Preseason NIT	W 78–76	3–0	–	–	–	Madison Square Garden; New York, NY
11/29/1986*	No. 5	vs. Western Kentucky; Preseason NIT Championship	W 96–95 ^{2OT}	4–0	–	–	–	Madison Square Garden; New York, NY
Dec 5, 1986*	No. 2	at Memphis State	W 80–77	5–0	26 – Paddio	–	–	Mid-South Coliseum; Memphis, Tennessee
12/19/1986*	No. 1	Ohio; Rebel Round-Up	W 105–81	8–0	–	–	–	Thomas & Mack Center; Las Vegas, NV
12/20/1986*	No. 1	Louisiana Tech	W 79–75	9–0	–	–	–	Thomas & Mack Center; Las Vegas, NV
12/27/1986*	No. 1	Old Dominion; UNLV Holiday Classic	W 103-83	10–0	35 – Gilliam	–	–	Thomas & Mack Center (19,320); Las Vegas, NV
12/28/1986*	No. 1	No. 12 Navy; UNLV Holiday Classic	W 104–79	11–0	27 – Gilliam	–	21 – Wade	Thomas & Mack Center (20,321); Las Vegas, NV
1/3/1987	No. 1	UC Irvine	W 114–72	12–0 (1–0)	–	–	–	Thomas & Mack Center (19,058); Las Vegas, NV
1/8/1987	No. 1	San Jose State	W 89–77	13–0 (2–0)	–	–	–	Thomas & Mack Center; Las Vegas, NV
1/10/1987	No. 1	Utah State	W 114–94	14–0 (3–0)	–	–	–	Thomas & Mack Center (19,418); Las Vegas, NV
Jan 15, 1987	No. 1	at UC Santa Barbara	W 88–74	15–0 (4–0)	–	–	–	The Thunderdome; Santa Barbara, CA
1/17/1987*	No. 1	at No. 16 Oklahoma	L 88–89	15–1	–	–	–	Lloyd Noble Center; Norman, OK
1/19/1987	No. 4	at Cal State Fullerton	W 73–65	16–1 (5–0)	–	–	–	Titan Gym; Fullerton, CA
1/22/1987	No. 4	Long Beach State	W 104–74	17–1 (6–0)	–	–	–	Thomas & Mack Center; Las Vegas, NV
1/24/1987	No. 4	New Mexico State	W 85–58	18–1 (7–0)	–	–	–	Thomas & Mack Center; Las Vegas, NV
1/26/1987	No. 3	Fresno State	W 106–58	19–1 (8–0)	–	–	–	Thomas & Mack Center (18,068); Las Vegas, NV
1/29/1987	No. 3	at UC Irvine	W 114–103	20–1 (9–0)	–	–	–	Bren Events Center (4,644); Irvine, CA
2/1/1987*	No. 3	at No. 18 Auburn	W 104–85	21–1	–	–	–	Beard–Eaves–Memorial Coliseum; Auburn, AL
2/5/1987	No. 1	at Utah State	W 113–78	22–1 (10–0)	–	–	–	Smith Spectrum (10,280); Logan, UT
2/7/1987	No. 1	at San Jose State	W 83–74	23–1 (11–0)	–	–	–	San Jose Civic Auditorium; San Jose, CA
2/9/1987	No. 1	at Pacific	W 73–59	24–1 (12–0)	–	–	–	Alex G. Spanos Center; Stockton, CA
2/12/1987	No. 1	Cal State Fullerton	W 74–64	25–1 (13–0)	–	–	–	Thomas & Mack Center; Las Vegas, NV
2/14/1987	No. 1	UC Santa Barbara	W 86–76	26–1 (14–0)	–	–	–	Thomas & Mack Center; Las Vegas, NV
2/19/1987	No. 1	at Long Beach State	W 86–66	27–1 (15–0)	–	–	–	Gold Mine (8,663); Long Beach, CA
2/21/1987	No. 1	at New Mexico State	W 80–69	28–1 (16–0)	–	–	–	Pan American Center; Las Cruces, NM
2/26/1987	No. 1	Pacific	W 82–55	29–1 (17–0)	–	–	–	Thomas & Mack Center; Las Vegas, NV
Mar 1, 1987	No. 1	at Fresno State	W 70–59	30–1 (18–0)	–	–	–	Selland Arena (10,132); Fresno, CA
PCAA tournament
3/5/1987*	(1) No. 1	vs. (8) Long Beach State; Quarterfinals	W 105–70	31–1	–	–	–	The Forum; Inglewood, CA
3/6/1987*	(1) No. 1	vs. (5) Cal State Fullerton; Semifinals	W 99–65	32–1	–	–	–	The Forum; Inglewood, CA
3/7/1987*	(1) No. 1	vs. (3) San Jose State; Championship Game	W 94–69	33–1	–	–	–	The Forum; Inglewood, CA
NCAA tournament
3/12/1987*; ESPN	(W1) No. 1	vs. (W16) Idaho State; First Round	W 95–70	34–1	23 – Banks	10 – Hudson	9 – Wade	Special Events Center (11,314); Salt Lake City, UT
3/14/1987*; CBS	(W1) No. 1	vs. (W9) Kansas State; Second Round	W 80–61	35–1	24 – Gilliam	11 – Gilliam	13 – Wade	Special Events Center (14,944); Salt Lake City, UT
3/20/1987*; CBS	(W1) No. 1	vs. (W12) Wyoming; Sweet Sixteen	W 92–78	36–1	38 – Gilliam	13 – Gilliam	9 – Wade	Kingdome (23,035); Seattle, WA
3/22/1987*; CBS	(W1) No. 1	vs. (W2) No. 6 Iowa; Elite Eight	W 84–81	37–1	27 – Gilliam	10 – Gilliam	12 – Wade	Kingdome (22,914); Seattle, WA
3/28/1987*; CBS	(W1) No. 1	vs. (MW1) No. 3 Indiana; Final Four	L 93–97	37–2	38 – Banks	10 – Gilliam	18 – Wade	Louisiana Superdome (64,959); New Orleans, LA
*Non-conference game. ^{#}Rankings from AP Poll. (#) Tournament seedings in parentheses.

== Rankings ==
Ranking movements Legend: ██ Increase in ranking ██ Decrease in ranking ( ) = First-place votes
	Week															
Poll	Pre	1	2	3	4	5	6	7	8	9	10	11	12	13	14	Final
AP	5	2	1	1	1	1	1	1	4	3	1	1	1	1	1	1
Coaches	Not released	2	1	1	1	1	1	1	3	2	1 (32)	1	1 (30)	1	1 (29)	1 (39)

== Awards and honors ==
- Armon Gilliam – PCAA Player of the Year, Consensus Second-team All-American

== Team players drafted into the NBA ==
Round	Pick	Player	NBA club
1	2	Armon Gilliam	Phoenix Suns
2	24	Freddie Banks	Detroit Pistons

== See also ==
- UNLV Runnin' Rebels basketball
- 1987 NCAA Division I men's basketball tournament
