= 1986–87 Nebraska Cornhuskers men's basketball team =

American college basketball season

1986–87 Nebraska Cornhuskers men's basketball

NIT, 3rd place
- Conference: Big Eight Conference
- Head coach: Danny Nee (1st season)
- Assistant coaches: Lynn Mitchem; Arden Reid
- Home arena: Bob Devaney Sports Center

1986–87 Big Eight Conference men's basketball standings
| | Conf. | | | | Overall |
| Team | W | | L | PCT | W | | L | PCT |
|---|---|---|---|---|---|---|---|---|
| No. 14 Missouri † | 11 | – | 3 | .786 | 24 | – | 10 | .706 |
| No. 20 Kansas | 9 | – | 5 | .643 | 25 | – | 11 | .694 |
| Oklahoma | 9 | – | 5 | .643 | 24 | – | 10 | .706 |
| Kansas State | 8 | – | 6 | .571 | 20 | – | 11 | .645 |
| Nebraska | 7 | – | 7 | .500 | 21 | – | 12 | .636 |
| Iowa State | 5 | – | 9 | .357 | 13 | – | 15 | .464 |
| Oklahoma State | 4 | – | 10 | .286 | 8 | – | 20 | .286 |
| Colorado | 3 | – | 11 | .214 | 9 | – | 19 | .321 |
† 1987 Big Eight tournament winner Rankings from AP poll

The 1986–87 Nebraska Cornhuskers men's basketball team represented the University of Nebraska–Lincoln during the 1986–87 college basketball season. Led by head coach Danny Nee (1st season), the Cornhuskers competed in the Big Eight Conference and played their home games at the Bob Devaney Sports Center.

They finished with a record of 21–12 overall and 7–7 in Big Eight Conference play. They played in the 1987 National Invitation Tournament, reaching the NIT Final Four and finishing 3rd place.

== Roster ==
1986–87 Nebraska Cornhuskers men's basketball team
Players
Coaches

| Pos. | # | Name | Height | Weight | Year | Previous school | Hometown |
|---|---|---|---|---|---|---|---|
| F | 4 | Jeff Rekeweg | 6 ft 6 in (1.98 m) | 185 lb (84 kg) | Jr | DeKalb | Kendallville, IN |
| G | 10 | Henry Buchanan | 6 ft 0 in (1.83 m) | 165 lb (75 kg) | Jr | Southside | Muncie, IN |
| C | 12 | Richard van Poelgeest | 6 ft 9 in (2.06 m) | 220 lb (100 kg) | Fr | Upenbare | Rijswijk, Netherlands |
| G | 14 | Anthony Bailous | 6 ft 3 in (1.91 m) | 185 lb (84 kg) | Sr | Canoga Park | Los Angeles, CA |
| G | 20 | Brian Carr | 6 ft 0 in (1.83 m) | 165 lb (75 kg) | Sr | Burris | Muncie, IN |
| G | 22 | Joel Sealer | 6 ft 2 in (1.88 m) | 180 lb (82 kg) | Jr | Millard South | Omaha, NE |
| F | 24 | Derrick Vick | 6 ft 6 in (1.98 m) | 200 lb (91 kg) | Jr | Corliss | Chicago, IL |
| G | 30 | Bernard Day | 6 ft 5 in (1.96 m) | 200 lb (91 kg) | Sr | Woodson | Washington, D.C. |
| F | 32 | Mike Martz | 6 ft 6 in (1.98 m) | 205 lb (93 kg) | Sr | Beatrice | Beatrice, NE |
| F | 35 | Bill Jackman | 6 ft 9 in (2.06 m) | 215 lb (98 kg) | Sr | Perkins County | Grant, NE |
| F | 40 | Beau Reid | 6 ft 7 in (2.01 m) | 200 lb (91 kg) | Fr | Lancaster | Lancaster, OH |
| F | 44 | Keith Neubert | 6 ft 7 in (2.01 m) | 235 lb (107 kg) | Jr | Fort Atkinson | Fort Atkinson, WI |

Head coach

Danny Nee

Assistant coach(es)

- Lynn Mitchem
- Arden Reid

Legend

- (C) Team captain
- (S) Suspended
- (I) Ineligible
- (W) Walk-on
- Injured
- Current redshirt

Roster
Last update: May 29, 2024

== Schedule and results ==
| Date time, TV | Rank^{#} | Opponent^{#} | Result | Record | Site city, state |
Regular season
| Nov 28, 1986* | | at UC Irvine | L 101-109 | 0-1 | Crawford Hall (1,458); Irvine, CA |
| Dec 1, 1986* | | Oregon | W 76-60 | 1-1 | Bob Devaney Sports Center; Lincoln, NE |
| Dec 6, 1986* | | at Creighton; Rivalry | L 66-78 | 1-2 | Omaha Civic Auditorium; Omaha, NE |
| Dec 10, 1986* | | at Southern Illinois | W 87-85 | 2-2 | Banterra Center; Carbondale, IL |
| Dec 14, 1986* | | at Texas A&M | L 64-66 | 2-3 | G. Rollie White Coliseum; College Station, TX |
| Dec 20, 1986* | | Wyoming | W 62-61 | 3-3 | Bob Devaney Sports Center; Lincoln, NE |
| Dec 22, 1986* | | Detroit | W 71-55 | 4-3 | Bob Devaney Sports Center; Lincoln, NE |
| Dec 27, 1986* | | Missouri–St. Louis | W 89-63 | 5-3 | Bob Devaney Sports Center; Lincoln, NE |
| Dec 29, 1986* | | vs. Butler; Rochester Classic | W 67-56 | 6-3 | Rochester, NY |
| Dec 30, 1986* | | vs. San Francisco; Rochester Classic | W 66-60 | 7-3 | Rochester, NY |
| Jan 3, 1987* | | Creighton | W 70-65 ^{OT} | 8-3 | Bob Devaney Sports Center; Lincoln, NE |
| Jan 5, 1987* | | NW Missouri State | W 105-64 | 9-3 | Bob Devaney Sports Center; Lincoln, NE |
| Jan 7, 1987* | | Brooklyn | W 62-46 | 10-3 | Bob Devaney Sports Center; Lincoln, NE |
| Jan 10, 1987 | | at Kansas State | L 82-114 | 10-4 (0-1) | Ahearn Field House; Manhattan, KS |
| Jan 17, 1987 | | Colorado | W 86-66 | 11-4 (1-1) | Bob Devaney Sports Center; Lincoln, NE |
| Jan 20, 1987; 7:00 p.m., Big Eight | | at Iowa State | L 75-91 | 11-5 (1-2) | Hilton Coliseum; Ames, IA |
| Jan 22, 1987 | | at Kansas | L 65-86 | 11-6 (1-3) | Allen Fieldhouse; Lawrence, KS |
| Jan 28, 1987 | | Missouri | L 71-87 | 11-7 (1-4) | Bob Devaney Sports Center; Lincoln, NE |
| Feb 1, 1987 | | Oklahoma State | W 73-66 | 12-7 (2-4) | Bob Devaney Sports Center; Lincoln, NE |
| Feb 4, 1987 | | No. 8 Oklahoma | L 66-80 | 12-8 (2-5) | Bob Devaney Sports Center; Lincoln, NE |
| Feb 7, 1987 | | at Colorado | W 68-65 | 13-8 (3-5) | Coors Event Center; Boulder, CO |
| Feb 11, 1987; 7:35 p.m., Score | | Iowa State | W 66-65 | 14-8 (4-5) | Bob Devaney Sports Center; Lincoln, NE |
| Feb 14, 1987 | | at Kansas State | W 78-76 | 15-8 (5-5) | Bob Devaney Sports Center; Lincoln, NE |
| Feb 18, 1987 | | at Missouri | L 64-80 | 15-9 (5-6) | Hearnes Center; Columbia, MO |
| Feb 21, 1987 | | at No. 13 Oklahoma | L 97-133 | 15-10 (5-7) | Lloyd Noble Center; Norman, OK |
| Feb 25, 1987 | | at Oklahoma State | W 79-77 ^{2OT} | 16-10 (6-7) | Gallagher-Iba Arena; Stillwater, OK |
| Feb 28, 1987 | | No. 16 Kansas | W 83-81 ^{OT} | 17-10 (7-7) | Bob Devaney Sports Center; Lincoln, NE |
Big 8 Tournament
| Mar 6, 1987 | (5) | vs. (4) Kansas State; Quarterfinals | L 45-47 | 17-11 | Kemper Arena; Kansas City, MO |
National Invitation Tournament
| Mar 11, 1987 | | Marquette; First Round | W 78-76 | 18-11 | Bob Devaney Sports Center; Lincoln, NE |
| Mar 17, 1987 | | Arkansas; Second Round | W 78-71 | 19-11 | Bob Devaney Sports Center; Lincoln, NE |
| Mar 21, 1987 | | Washington; Quarterfinals | W 81-76 | 20-11 | Bob Devaney Sports Center; Lincoln, NE |
| Mar 24, 1987 | | vs. Southern Miss; Semifinals | L 75-82 | 20-12 | Madison Square Garden; New York, NY |
| Mar 26, 1987 | | Arkansas–Little Rock; Third Place Game | W 76-67 ^{OT} | 21-12 | Madison Square Garden; New York, NY |
*Non-conference game. ^{#}Rankings from AP Poll. (#) Tournament seedings in parentheses. All times are in Central Time.
