= 1986–87 Missouri Tigers men's basketball team =

American college basketball season

1986–87 Missouri Tigers men's basketball

Big Eight Regular season champions Big Eight tournament champions

NCAA tournament, first round
- Conference: Big Eight Conference

Ranking
- Coaches: No. 14
- AP: No. 14
- Record: 24–10 (11–3 Big 8)
- Head coach: Norm Stewart (20th season)
- Assistant coaches: Bob Sundvold (6th season); Rich Daly (4th season); Anthony Smith (2nd season)
- Home arena: Hearnes Center

1986–87 Big Eight Conference men's basketball standings
	Conf.				Overall
Team	W		L	PCT	W		L	PCT
No. 14 Missouri †	11	–	3	.786	24	–	10	.706
No. 20 Kansas	9	–	5	.643	25	–	11	.694
Oklahoma	9	–	5	.643	24	–	10	.706
Kansas State	8	–	6	.571	20	–	11	.645
Nebraska	7	–	7	.500	21	–	12	.636
Iowa State	5	–	9	.357	13	–	15	.464
Oklahoma State	4	–	10	.286	8	–	20	.286
Colorado	3	–	11	.214	9	–	19	.321
† 1987 Big Eight tournament winner Rankings from AP poll

The 1986–87 Missouri Tigers men's basketball team represented the University of Missouri as a member of the Big Eight Conference during the 1986–87 NCAA men's basketball season. Led by head coach Norm Stewart, the Tigers won Big Eight regular season and tournament titles, and were the No. 4 seed in the Midwest region of the NCAA tournament. The Tigers were upset by Xavier, 70–69, in the opening round and finished with an overall record of 24–10 (11–3 Big Eight).

== Roster ==
1986–87 Missouri Tigers men's basketball team
Players
Coaches

Pos.	#	Name	Height	Weight	Year	Hometown
F	3	Derrick Chievous	6 ft 7 in (2.01 m)	190 lb (86 kg)	Jr	New York, New York
G	4	Lee Coward	6 ft 1 in (1.85 m)	—	Fr	Detroit, MI
F	33	Greg Church	6 ft 8 in (2.03 m)	221 lb (100 kg)	So
F	42	Mike Sandbothe	6 ft 8 in (2.03 m)	—	So
C	52	Gary Leonard	7 ft 1 in (2.16 m)	264 lb (120 kg)	So	Belleville, Illinois

Head coach

- Norm Stewart (Missouri)

Assistant coach(es)

- Bob Sundvold
- Rich Daly
- Anthony Smith

Legend

- (C) Team captain
- (S) Suspended
- (I) Ineligible
- (W) Walk-on
- Injured
- Current redshirt

== Schedule and results ==
Date time, TV	Rank^{#}	Opponent^{#}	Result	Record	Site (attendance) city, state
Regular season
Nov 28, 1986*		vs. Arkansas State; Maui Invitational tournament	W 79–63	1–0	Lahaina Civic Center; Lahaina, Hawaii
Nov 29, 1986*		vs. Vanderbilt; Maui Invitational Tournament	L 54–69	1–1	Lahaina Civic Center; Lahaina, Hawaii
Nov 30, 1986*		vs. Long Beach State; Maui Invitational Tournament	W 71–68	2–1	Lahaina Civic Center; Lahaina, Hawaii
Dec 2, 1986*		at California	L 63–64	2–2	Harmon Gym; Berkeley, California
Dec 5, 1986*		SW Missouri State	W 57–53	3–2	Hearnes Center; Columbia, Missouri
Dec 9, 1986*		Drake	W 63–59	4–2	Hearnes Center; Columbia, Missouri
Dec 15, 1986*		Centenary	W 97–64	5–2	Hearnes Center; Columbia, Missouri
Dec 16, 1986*		Austin Peay	W 79–73	6–2	Hearnes Center; Columbia, Missouri
Dec 23, 1986*		vs. No. 9 Illinois; Braggin' Rights	L 74–92	6–3	St. Louis Arena (16,500); St. Louis, Missouri
Dec 29, 1986*		vs. Oral Roberts; BMA Holiday Classic	W 84–57	7–3	Kemper Arena; Kansas City, Missouri
Dec 30, 1986*		vs. Alabama; BMA Holiday Classic	L 82–91	7–4	Kemper Arena; Kansas City, Missouri
Jan 3, 1987*		Memphis State	L 59–61	7–5	Hearnes Center; Columbia, Missouri
Jan 5, 1987*		at St. Bonaventure	W 83–62	8–5	Reilly Center; St. Bonaventure, New York
Jan 7, 1987*		at Virginia	L 50–66	8–6	University Hall; Charlottesville, Virginia
Jan 10, 1987		No. 11 Oklahoma	W 87–83	9–6 (1–0)	Hearnes Center; Columbia, Missouri
Jan 14, 1987*		Old Dominion	W 78–66	10–6	Hearnes Center; Columbia, Missouri
Jan 17, 1987		Oklahoma State	W 87–77	11–6 (2–0)	Hearnes Center; Columbia, Missouri
Jan 21, 1987		at Kansas; Border War	L 70–71	11–7 (2–1)	Allen Fieldhouse; Lawrence, Kansas
Jan 24, 1987		Colorado	W 77–56	12–7 (3–1)	Hearnes Center; Columbia, Missouri
Jan 28, 1987		at Nebraska	W 87–71	13–7 (4–1)	Bob Devaney Sports Center; Lincoln, Nebraska
Feb 1, 1987		Kansas State	W 68–64	14–7 (5–1)	Hearnes Center; Columbia, Missouri
Feb 4, 1987		at Iowa State	L 92–96	14–8 (5–2)	Hilton Coliseum; Ames, Iowa
Feb 7, 1987		at No. 8 Oklahoma	L 78–81	14–9 (5–3)	Lloyd Noble Center; Norman, Oklahoma
Feb 11, 1987		No. 17 Kansas	W 63–60	15–9 (6–3)	Hearnes Center; Columbia, Missouri
Feb 14, 1987		at Oklahoma State	W 69–68	16–9 (7–3)	Gallagher-Iba Arena; Stillwater, Oklahoma
Feb 18, 1987		Nebraska	W 80–64	17–9 (8–3)	Hearnes Center; Columbia, Missouri
Feb 21, 1987		at Colorado	W 76–68	18–9 (9–3)	Coors Events Center; Boulder, Colorado
Feb 25, 1987		at Kansas State	W 80–75	19–9 (10–3)	Ahearn Field House; Manhattan, Kansas
Feb 28, 1987		Iowa State	W 85–77	21–9 (11–3)	Hearnes Center; Columbia, Missouri
Big Eight Conference tournament
Mar 6, 1987*	No. 19	vs. Colorado; Quarterfinals	W 65–59	22–9	Kemper Arena; Kansas City, Missouri
Mar 7, 1987*	No. 19	vs. Kansas State; Semifinals	W 72–69	23–9	Kemper Arena; Kansas City, Missouri
Mar 8, 1987*	No. 19	vs. Kansas; Championship game	W 67–65	24–9	Kemper Arena; Kansas City, Missouri
NCAA tournament
Mar 12, 1987*	(4 MW) No. 14	vs. (13 MW) Xavier; First round	L 69–70	24–10	RCA Dome; Indianapolis, Indiana
*Non-conference game. ^{#}Rankings from AP poll. (#) Tournament seedings in parentheses. MW=Midwest. All times are in Central.
