= 1987 Missouri Valley Conference men's basketball tournament =

- Classification: Division I
- Season: 1986–87
- Teams: 7
- Site: Tulsa Convention Center; Tulsa, Oklahoma
- Champions: Wichita State (2nd title)
- Winning coach: Eddie Fogler (1st title)
- MVP: Gary Cundiff (Wichita State)

1986–87 Missouri Valley Conference men's basketball standings
	Conf.				Overall
Team	W		L	PCT	W		L	PCT
Tulsa	11	–	3	.786	22	–	8	.733
Bradley	10	–	4	.714	17	–	12	.586
Wichita State †	9	–	5	.643	22	–	11	.667
Illinois State	7	–	7	.500	19	–	13	.594
Drake	6	–	8	.429	17	–	14	.548
Southern Illinois	5	–	9	.357	12	–	17	.414
Indiana State	4	–	10	.286	9	–	20	.310
Creighton	4	–	10	.286	9	–	19	.321
† 1987 MVC tournament winner Rankings from AP Poll

The 1987 Missouri Valley Conference men's basketball tournament was played after the conclusion of the 1986–1987 regular season at the Tulsa Convention Center in Tulsa, Oklahoma.

The Wichita State Shockers defeated the Tulsa Golden Hurricane in the championship game, 79–74 in overtime, and as a result won their 2nd MVC Tournament title and earned an automatic bid to the 1987 NCAA tournament.

== Bracket ==
Quarterfinals; February 28, 1987
4	Drake	70
5	Southern Illinois	76
2	Wichita State	73
7	Creighton	70
3	Illinois State	70
6	Indiana State	55

Semifinals; March 1, 1987
1	Tulsa	61
5	Southern Illinois	56
2	Wichita State	56
3	Illinois State	53

Final; March 2, 1987
1	Tulsa	74^{OT}
2	Wichita State	79
