= 1986–87 Bradley Braves men's basketball team =

American college basketball season

1986–87 Bradley Braves men's basketball
- Conference: Missouri Valley Conference
- Record: 17–12 (10–4 MVC)
- Head coach: Stan Albeck (1st season)
- Assistant coaches: Morris McHone; Marty Gillespie
- Home arena: Carver Arena

1986–87 Missouri Valley Conference men's basketball standings
	Conf.				Overall
Team	W		L	PCT	W		L	PCT
Tulsa	11	–	3	.786	22	–	8	.733
Bradley	10	–	4	.714	17	–	12	.586
Wichita State †	9	–	5	.643	22	–	11	.667
Illinois State	7	–	7	.500	19	–	13	.594
Drake	6	–	8	.429	17	–	14	.548
Southern Illinois	5	–	9	.357	12	–	17	.414
Indiana State	4	–	10	.286	9	–	20	.310
Creighton	4	–	10	.286	9	–	19	.321
† 1987 MVC tournament winner Rankings from AP Poll

The 1986–87 Bradley Braves men's basketball team represented Bradley University during the 1986–87 NCAA Division I men's basketball season. The Braves were members of the Missouri Valley Conference (MVC) and played their home games at Carver Arena. Following the departure of former head coach Dick Versace, Bradley was banned from postseason play. The Braves were led by first year head coach Stan Albeck and AP Honorable mention All-American Hersey Hawkins, who averaged 27.2 points per game.

== Roster ==
1986–87 Bradley Braves men's basketball team
Players
Coaches

Pos.	#	Name	Height	Weight	Year	Previous school	Hometown
G	12	Anthony Manuel	5 ft 11 in (1.8 m)	185 lb (84 kg)	So	Crane	Chicago, IL
F	21	Jerry Thomas	6 ft 6 in (1.98 m)	210 lb (95 kg)	Jr	Collins	Chicago, IL
F	23	Paul Wilson	6 ft 6 in (1.98 m)	—	So	Lorain Catholic	Lorain, OH
F/C	24	Donald Powell	6 ft 8 in (2.03 m)	215 lb (98 kg)	Jr	Nowata	Nowata, OK
C	25	Keith Berry	6 ft 9 in (2.06 m)	193 lb (88 kg)	Sr	Dunbar	Chicago, IL
F	32	Greg Jones	6 ft 5 in (1.96 m)	—	Jr	Robeson	Chicago, IL
G	33	Hersey Hawkins	6 ft 3 in (1.91 m)	185 lb (84 kg)	Jr	Westinghouse	Chicago, IL
F	40	Trevor Trimpe	6 ft 7 in (2.01 m)	—	Jr	Havana	Havana, IL
G	41	Mike Cash	6 ft 3 in (1.91 m)	—	Fr	Lowell	Lowell, IN
G	44	Len Bertolini	6 ft 3 in (1.91 m)	—	Jr	St. Patrick's	Chicago, IL
G	50	Jeff Anthony	6 ft 0 in (1.83 m)	180 lb (82 kg)	Jr	East St. Louis	East St. Louis, IL
F	52	Bruce Mordini	6 ft 7 in (2.01 m)	—	Jr	Highland Park	Highland Park, IL
C	53	Luke Jackson	6 ft 8 in (2.03 m)	225 lb (102 kg)	Fr	Calvary Academy	Springfield, IL

Head coach

- Stan Albeck

Assistant coach(es)

- Willie Cox
- Marty Gillespie
- Morris McHone

Legend

- (C) Team captain
- (S) Suspended
- (I) Ineligible
- (W) Walk-on
- Injured
- Current redshirt

Roster

== Schedule ==
Date time, TV	Rank^{#}	Opponent^{#}	Result	Record	Site (attendance) city, state
Regular season
Nov 21, 1986*		at Michigan; Coca-Cola NIT Classic	L 107–115	0–1	Crisler Arena; Ann Arbor, MI
Dec 1, 1986*		at UC Irvine	L 111–121	0–2	Crawford Hall (1,229); Irvine, CA
Dec 3, 1986*		at Long Beach State	L 74–80	0–3	The Gold Mine; Long Beach, CA
Dec 6, 1986*		SIU Edwardsville	W 88–82	1–3	Carver Arena; Peoria, IL
Dec 13, 1986*		Northern Illinois	W 86–63	2–3	Carver Arena; Peoria, IL
Dec 20, 1986*		Marquette	W 73–70	3–3	Carver Arena; Peoria, IL
Dec 22, 1986*		at Evansville	L 68–77	3–4	Roberts Municipal Stadium; Evansville, IN
Dec 26, 1986*		vs. Northeastern; Jostens Tournament	W 110–105	4–4	The Palestra; Philadelphia, PA
Dec 27, 1986*		vs. Saint Joseph's; Jostens Tournament	L 77–86	4–5	The Palestra; Philadelphia, PA
Jan 3, 1987*		Detroit	W 75–59	5–5	Carver Arena; Peoria, IL
Jan 5, 1987*		Loyola (IL)	W 82–79	6–5	Carver Arena; Peoria, IL
Jan 7, 1987*		at Saint Louis	L 65–67	6–6	Kiel Auditorium; Saint Louis, MO
Jan 10, 1987		Southern Illinois	W 96–79	7–6 (1–0)	Carver Arena; Peoria, IL
Jan 15, 1987		at Indiana State	L 65–72	7–7 (1–1)	Hulman Center; Terre Haute, IN
Jan 17, 1987*		at UAB	L 69–80	7–8	BJCC Coliseum; Birmingham, AL
Jan 19, 1987; 7:30 pm		at Illinois State	W 73–65	8–8 (2–1)	Horton Fieldhouse (7,745); Normal, IL
Jan 22, 1987		Creighton	W 95–67	9–8 (3–1)	Carver Arena; Peoria, IL
Jan 26, 1987		Tulsa	W 92–83	10–8 (4–1)	Carver Arena; Peoria, IL
Jan 29, 1987		at Wichita State	L 64–66	10–9 (4–2)	Levitt Arena; Wichita, KS
Jan 31, 1987		at Drake	W 92–66	11–9 (5–2)	Veterans Memorial Auditorium; Des Moines, IA
Feb 4, 1987		at Southern Illinois	W 97–86	12–9 (6–2)	SIU Arena; Carbondale, IL
Feb 7, 1987*		Memphis	L 74–82	12–10	Carver Arena; Peoria, IL
Feb 9, 1987*		Dayton	W 90–79	13–10	Carver Arena; Peoria, IL
Feb 12, 1987		Indiana State	W 113–84	14–10 (7–2)	Carver Arena; Peoria, IL
Feb 14, 1987		Wichita State	W 79–78	15–10 (8–2)	Carver Arena; Peoria, IL
Feb 16, 1987		at Creighton	W 66–64	16–10 (9–2)	Omaha Civic Auditorium; Omaha, NE
Feb 18, 1987; 9:00 pm		Illinois State	W 93–81	17–10 (10–2)	Carver Arena (10,401); Peoria, IL
Feb 21, 1987		at Tulsa	L 70–74	17–11 (10–3)	Tulsa Convention Center; Tulsa, OK
Feb 26, 1987		Drake	L 77–79	17–12 (10–4)	Carver Arena; Peoria, IL
*Non-conference game. ^{#}Rankings from AP Poll. (#) Tournament seedings in parentheses. All times are in Central Time.

== Awards and honors ==
- Hersey Hawkins – MVC Player of the Year
