= 1987 Big Eight Conference men's basketball tournament =

- Classification: Division I
- Season: 1986–87
- Teams: 8
- Finals site: Kemper Arena; Kansas City, MO
- Champions: Missouri (3rd title)
- Winning coach: Norm Stewart (3rd title)
- MVP: Danny Manning (Kansas)
- Television: Raycom Sports (Quarterfinals, Semi-Finals and Championship); ABC (Championship game)

1986–87 Big Eight Conference men's basketball standings
	Conf.				Overall
Team	W		L	PCT	W		L	PCT
No. 14 Missouri †	11	–	3	.786	24	–	10	.706
No. 20 Kansas	9	–	5	.643	25	–	11	.694
Oklahoma	9	–	5	.643	24	–	10	.706
Kansas State	8	–	6	.571	20	–	11	.645
Nebraska	7	–	7	.500	21	–	12	.636
Iowa State	5	–	9	.357	13	–	15	.464
Oklahoma State	4	–	10	.286	8	–	20	.286
Colorado	3	–	11	.214	9	–	19	.321
† 1987 Big Eight tournament winner Rankings from AP poll

The 1987 Big Eight Conference men's basketball tournament was held March 6–8 at Kemper Arena in Kansas City, Missouri.

Top-seeded Missouri defeated #2 seed Kansas in the championship game, 67–65, to earn the conference's automatic bid to the 1987 NCAA tournament.

== Bracket ==
Quarterfinals; Friday, March 6
1	#19 Missouri	65
8	Colorado	59
4	Kansas State	47
5	Nebraska	45
3	#17 Oklahoma	83
6	Iowa State	73
7	Oklahoma State	58
2	Kansas	67

Semifinals; Saturday, March 7
1	#19 Missouri	72
4	Kansas State	69
3	#17 Oklahoma	77
2	Kansas	82

Championship; Sunday, March 8
1	#19 Missouri	67
2	Kansas	65
