= 1986–87 Wichita State Shockers men's basketball team =

American college basketball season

1986–87 Wichita State Shockers men's basketball

MVC tournament champions

NCAA tournament
- Conference: Missouri Valley Conference
- Record: 22–11 (9–5 MVC)
- Head coach: Eddie Fogler (1st season)
- Home arena: Levitt Arena (10,506)

1986–87 Missouri Valley Conference men's basketball standings
	Conf.				Overall
Team	W		L	PCT	W		L	PCT
Tulsa	11	–	3	.786	22	–	8	.733
Bradley	10	–	4	.714	17	–	12	.586
Wichita State †	9	–	5	.643	22	–	11	.667
Illinois State	7	–	7	.500	19	–	13	.594
Drake	6	–	8	.429	17	–	14	.548
Southern Illinois	5	–	9	.357	12	–	17	.414
Indiana State	4	–	10	.286	9	–	20	.310
Creighton	4	–	10	.286	9	–	19	.321
† 1987 MVC tournament winner Rankings from AP Poll

The 1986–87 Wichita State Shockers men's basketball team represented Wichita State University in the 1986–87 NCAA Division I men's basketball season. They played their home games at the University of Wichita Field House. They were in their 42nd season as a member of the Missouri Valley Conference and 81st season overall. They were led by head coach Eddie Fogler in his 1st season at the school. They finished the season 22–11, 9–5 in Missouri Valley play to finish in third place. They won the MVC tournament to receive an automatic bid to the 1987 NCAA tournament. As the No. 11 seed in the Midwest region, the Shockers lost in the opening round to St. John's, 57–55.

== Roster ==
1986–87 Wichita State Shockers men's basketball team
Players
Coaches

Pos.	#	Name	Height	Weight	Year	Hometown
F		Henry Carr	6 ft 9 in (2.06 m)	—	Sr	Wichita, Kansas
C	45	Sasha Radunovich	6 ft 10 in (2.08 m)	230 lb (104 kg)	So

Head coach

- Eddie Fogler

Assistant coach(es)

Legend

- (C) Team captain
- (S) Suspended
- (I) Ineligible
- (W) Walk-on
- Injured
- Current redshirt

== Schedule and results ==
Date time, TV	Rank^{#}	Opponent^{#}	Result	Record	Site (attendance) city, state
Regular season
Nov 29, 1986*		Pacific	W 71–60	1–0	Levitt Arena; Wichita, Kansas
Dec 3, 1986*		at Southwestern Louisiana	W 79–64	2–0	Cajundome; Lafayette, Louisiana
Dec 5, 1986*		Northern Illinois	W 67–54	3–0	Levitt Arena; Wichita, Kansas
Dec 6, 1986*		Fordham	L 88–91	3–1	Levitt Arena; Wichita, Kansas
Dec 8, 1986*		at No. 3 Purdue	L 61–77	3–2	Mackey Arena; West Lafayette, Indiana
Dec 10, 1986*		at Mississippi State	W 61–48	4–2	Humphrey Coliseum; Starkville, Mississippi
Dec 13, 1986*		Kansas State	W 63–60	5–2	Levitt Arena; Wichita, Kansas
Dec 22, 1986*		at Minnesota	L 66–91	5–3	Williams Arena; Minneapolis, Minnesota
Dec 26, 1986*		vs. No. 7 Syracuse	L 69–83	5–4	
Dec 30, 1986*		Northern Arizona	W 68–49	6–4	Levitt Arena; Wichita, Kansas
Jan 3, 1987*		Texas-Rio Grande Valley	W 79–72	7–4	Levitt Arena; Wichita, Kansas
Jan 6, 1987*		No. 19 Kansas	W 54–49	8–4	Levitt Arena; Wichita, Kansas
Jan 10, 1987		Creighton	W 71–49	9–4 (1–0)	Levitt Arena; Wichita, Kansas
Jan 12, 1987*		at Kansas State	L 67–79	9–5	Ahearn Field House; Manhattan, Kansas
Jan 15, 1987		at Drake	L 51–61	9–6 (1–1)	Veterans Memorial Auditorium; Des Moines, Iowa
MVC Tournament
Feb 28, 1987*		Creighton; Quarterfinals	W 73–70	19–10	Levitt Arena; Wichita, Kansas
Mar 1, 1987*		Illinois State; Semifinals	W 56–53	21–10	Levitt Arena; Wichita, Kansas
Mar 2, 1987*		at Tulsa; Championship game	W 79–74 ^{OT}	22–10	Tulsa Convention Center; Tulsa, Oklahoma
NCAA tournament
Mar 13, 1987*	(11 MW)	vs. (6 MW) St. John's; First round	L 55–57	22–11	Rosemont Horizon; Rosemont, Illinois
*Non-conference game. ^{#}Rankings from AP poll. (#) Tournament seedings in parentheses. MW=Midwest. All times are in Central Time.
