= 1986–87 UC Irvine Anteaters men's basketball team =

American college basketball season

1986–87 UC Irvine Anteaters men's basketball
- Conference: Pacific Coast Athletic Association
- Record: 14–14 (9–9 PCAA)
- Head coach: Bill Mulligan (7th season)
- Home arena: Crawford Hall/Bren Events Center

1986–87 PCAA men's basketball standings
| | Conf. | | | | Overall |
| Team | W | | L | PCT | W | | L | PCT |
|---|---|---|---|---|---|---|---|---|
| No. 1 UNLV † | 18 | – | 0 | 1.000 | 37 | – | 2 | .949 |
| UC Santa Barbara | 10 | – | 8 | .556 | 16 | – | 12 | .571 |
| San Jose State | 10 | – | 8 | .556 | 16 | – | 14 | .533 |
| Cal State Fullerton | 9 | – | 9 | .500 | 17 | – | 13 | .567 |
| New Mexico State | 9 | – | 9 | .500 | 15 | – | 15 | .500 |
| UC Irvine | 9 | – | 9 | .500 | 14 | – | 14 | .500 |
| Utah State | 8 | – | 10 | .444 | 15 | – | 16 | .484 |
| Long Beach State | 7 | – | 11 | .389 | 10 | – | 17 | .370 |
| Pacific | 6 | – | 12 | .333 | 10 | – | 17 | .370 |
| Fresno State | 4 | – | 14 | .222 | 9 | – | 20 | .310 |
† 1987 PCAA tournament winner Rankings from AP poll

The 1986–87 UC Irvine Anteaters men's basketball team represented the University of California, Irvine during the 1986–87 NCAA Division I men's basketball season. The Anteaters were led by sixth year head coach Bill Mulligan. UCI played their first three home games at Crawford Hall until the new Bren Events Center was opened on January 8. They were members of the Pacific Coast Athletic Association. They finished the season 14–14 and 9–9 in PCAA play.

== Previous season ==
The 1985–86 Anteaters featured only one returning starter and the rest of the starting line-up was made up of transfers, including future NBA head coach Scott Brooks. Despite a slow start, the anteaters finished with an overall record of 16–11 which included an upset of #6 UNLV. They were invited to the 1986 National Invitation Tournament where they defeated UCLA and lost to BYU.

== Roster ==
1986–87 UC Irvine Anteaters men's basketball team
Players
Coaches

| Pos. | # | Name | Height | Weight | Year | Hometown |
|---|---|---|---|---|---|---|
| G | 12 | Scott Brooks | 5 ft 11 in (1.8 m) | 165 lb (75 kg) | Sr | French Camp, CA |
| G | 23 | Joe Buchanan | 6 ft 1 in (1.85 m) | 175 lb (79 kg) | Sr | Seattle, WA |
| C | | Mike Doktorczyk | 6 ft 9 in (2.06 m) | — | So |
| F | 22 | Rob Doktorczyk | 6 ft 9 in (2.06 m) | 175 lb (79 kg) | So | San Pedro, CA |
| F | 30 | Wayne Engelstad | 6 ft 8 in (2.03 m) | 245 lb (111 kg) | Jr | Rosemead, CA |
| F | | Steve Florentine | 6 ft 7 in (2.01 m) | — | Fr |
| G | | Kevin Floyd | 6 ft 5 in (1.96 m) | — | So |
| G | 25 | Mike Hess | 6 ft 1 in (1.85 m) | — | Jr |
| C | | Arthur Phillips | 6 ft 10 in (2.08 m) | — | Fr |
| G | 25 | Peter Strauss | 6 ft 5 in (1.96 m) | 180 lb (82 kg) | Jr | Hilton Head, SC |
| G | | Jason Turner | 6 ft 0 in (1.83 m) | — | Fr |
| F | | Mike Warren | 6 ft 8 in (2.03 m) | — | So |
| F | | Frank Woods | 6 ft 5 in (1.96 m) | — | Jr |

Head coach

Bill Mulligan

Assistant coach(es)

Legend

- (C) Team captain
- (S) Suspended
- (I) Ineligible
- (W) Walk-on
- Injured
- Current redshirt

Roster
Last update: September 19, 2017

== Schedule ==
| Date time, TV | Rank^{#} | Opponent^{#} | Result | Record | Site (attendance) city, state |
Non-Conference Season
| November 28, 1986* | | Nebraska | W 109–101 | 1–0 | Crawford Hall (1,458); Irvine, CA |
| December 1, 1986* | | Bradley | W 121–111 | 2–0 | Crawford Hall (1,229); Irvine, CA |
| December 4, 1986* | | at Tulsa | L 66–84 | 2–1 | Tulsa Convention Center (7,135); Tulsa, OK |
| December 6, 1986* | | at Oral Roberts | W 92–91 ^{OT} | 3–1 | Mabee Center (3,569); Tulsa, OK |
| December 16, 1986* | | at Boise State | L 71–81 | 3–2 | BSU Pavilion (4,129); Boise, ID |
| December 18, 1986* | | at Montana | L 80–101 | 3–3 | Dahlberg Arena (5,604); Missoula, MT |
| December 20, 1986* | | Pepperdine | W 103–91 | 4–3 | Crawford Hall (1,247); Irvine, CA |
| December 28, 1986* | | Eastern Washington; Anteater Classic | W 97–68 | 5–3 | Long Beach Arena (3,467); Long Beach, CA |
| December 29, 1986* | | No. 3 Iowa; Anteater Classic | L 103–105 | 5–4 | Long Beach Arena (4,380); Long Beach, CA |
Conference Season
| January 3, 1987 | | at No. 1 UNLV | L 72–114 | 5–5 (0–1) | Thomas & Mack Center (19,058); Paradise, NV |
| January 5, 1987 | | at Fresno State | T 66–66 | 5–6 (0–2) | Selland Arena (10,132); Fresno, CA |
| January 8, 1987 | | Utah State | W 118–96 | 6–6 (1–2) | Bren Events Center (4,542); Irvine, CA |
| January 10, 1987 | | San Jose State | W 89–84 | 7–6 (2–2) | Bren Events Center (2,743); Irvine, CA |
| January 12, 1987 | | Pacific | W 83–77 | 8–6 (3–2) | Bren Events Center (1,777); Irvine, CA |
| January 15, 1987 | | at Cal State Fullerton | W 76–70 | 9–6 (4–2) | Titan Gym (3,354); Fullerton, CA |
| January 17, 1987 | | at UC Santa Barbara | L 75–93 | 9–7 (4–3) | UC Santa Barbara Events Center (1,441); Santa Barbara, CA |
| January 19, 1987 | | at Long Beach State | L 71–78 | 9–8 (4–4) | Gold Mine (1,862); Long Beach, CA |
| January 22, 1987 | | New Mexico State | W 86–80 | 10–8 (5–4) | Bren Events Center (1,531); Irvine, CA |
| January 24, 1987 | | Long Beach State | W 81–66 | 11–8 (6–4) | Bren Events Center (3,244); Irvine, CA |
| January 29, 1987 | | No. 3 UNLV | L 103–114 | 11–9 (6–5) | Bren Events Center (4,644); Irvine, CA |
| February 5, 1987 | | at San Jose State | L 70–95 | 11–10 (6–6) | San Jose Civic Auditorium (2,481); San Jose, CA |
| February 7, 1987 | | at Utah State | L 103–106 | 11–11 (6–7) | Smith Spectrum (6,540); Logan, UT |
| February 12, 1987 | | UC Santa Barbara | L 85–92 | 11–12 (6–8) | Bren Events Center (2,563); Irvine, CA |
| February 14, 1987 | | Cal State Fullerton | W 78–69 ^{OT} | 12–12 (7–8) | Bren Events Center (4,522); Irvine, CA |
| February 19, 1987 | | at New Mexico State | L 66–70 ^{OT} | 12–13 (7–9) | Pan American Center (7,258); Las Cruces, NM |
| February 21, 1987 | | at Pacific | W 90–79 | 13–13 (8–9) | Alex G. Spanos Center (3,800); Stockton, CA |
| February 26, 1987 | | Fresno State | W 92–82 | 14–13 (9–9) | Bren Events Center (3,204); Irvine, CA |
PCAA tournament
| March 5, 1987 | | vs. Cal State Fullerton; Quarterfinals | L 81–92 | 14–14 | The Forum (11,338); Inglewood, CA |
*Non-conference game. ^{#}Rankings from AP Poll. (#) Tournament seedings in parentheses. All times are in Pacific Time.

== Awards and honors ==
- Scott Brooks
  - AP Honorable Mention All-American
  - PCAA First Team All-Conference
