= 1986–87 Tulsa Golden Hurricane men's basketball team =

American college basketball season

1986–87 Tulsa Golden Hurricane men's basketball

MVC Regular Season champion

NCAA tournament
- Conference: Missouri Valley Conference
- Record: 22–8 (11–3 MVC)
- Head coach: J. D. Barnett (2nd season)
- Home arena: Tulsa Convention Center

1986–87 Missouri Valley Conference men's basketball standings
	Conf.				Overall
Team	W		L	PCT	W		L	PCT
Tulsa	11	–	3	.786	22	–	8	.733
Bradley	10	–	4	.714	17	–	12	.586
Wichita State †	9	–	5	.643	22	–	11	.667
Illinois State	7	–	7	.500	19	–	13	.594
Drake	6	–	8	.429	17	–	14	.548
Southern Illinois	5	–	9	.357	12	–	17	.414
Indiana State	4	–	10	.286	9	–	20	.310
Creighton	4	–	10	.286	9	–	19	.321
† 1987 MVC tournament winner Rankings from AP Poll

The 1986–87 Tulsa Golden Hurricane men's basketball team represented the University of Tulsa as a member of the Missouri Valley Conference during the 1986–87 college basketball season. The Golden Hurricane played their home games at the Tulsa Convention Center. Led by head coach J. D. Barnett, they finished the season 22–8 overall and 11–3 in conference play to finish atop the MVC standings. The Golden Hurricane lost in the championship game of the MVC tournament, but did receive an at-large bid to the NCAA tournament as the No. 11 seed in the West region. Tulsa lost to No. 6 seed Oklahoma in the opening round.

== Roster ==
1986–87 Tulsa Golden Hurricane men's basketball team
Players
Coaches

Pos.	#	Name	Height	Weight	Year	Hometown
G	21	Byron Boudreaux	6 ft 4 in (1.93 m)	—	Sr
G	35	Tracy Moore	6 ft 5 in (1.96 m)	195 lb (88 kg)	Jr	Oklahoma City, Oklahoma

Head coach

J. D. Barnett

Assistant coach(es)

Legend

- (C) Team captain
- (S) Suspended
- (I) Ineligible
- (W) Walk-on
- Injured
- Current redshirt

== Schedule and results ==
Date time, TV	Rank^{#}	Opponent^{#}	Result	Record	Site (attendance) city, state
Regular season
Nov 28, 1986*		vs. Xavier; Fleet Classic	W 70–60	1–0	Providence Civic Center (8,464); Providence, Rhode Island
Nov 29, 1986*		at Providence; Fleet Classic	W 80–74	2–0	Providence Civic Center (10,511); Providence, Rhode Island
Dec 2, 1986*		Oral Roberts	W 71–44	3–0	Tulsa Convention Center (8,143); Tulsa, Oklahoma
Dec 4, 1986*		UC Irvine	W 84–66	4–0	Tulsa Convention Center (7,135); Tulsa, Oklahoma
Dec 6, 1986*		at Baylor	W 84–74	5–0	Heart O' Texas Coliseum (3,815); Waco, Texas
Dec 8, 1986*		at TCU	L 65–71	5–1	Daniel-Meyer Coliseum (4,884); Fort Worth, Texas
MVC Tournament
Mar 1, 1987*		Southern Illinois	W 61–56	21–6	Tulsa Convention Center (5,405); Tulsa, Oklahoma
Mar 2, 1987*		Wichita State	L 74–79 ^{OT}	21–7	Tulsa Convention Center (7,427); Tulsa, Oklahoma
NCAA Tournament
Mar 13, 1987*	(11 W)	vs. (6 W) Oklahoma; First round	L 69–74	22–8	McKale Center (11,082); Tucson, Arizona
*Non-conference game. ^{#}Rankings from AP. (#) Tournament seedings in parentheses. W=West. All times are in Central.
