= 1987 Pacific Coast Athletic Association men's basketball tournament =

- Classification: Division I
- Season: 1986–87
- Teams: 8
- Site: The Forum; Inglewood, CA
- Champions: UNLV (4th title)
- Winning coach: Jerry Tarkanian (4th title)
- MVP: Freddie Banks (UNLV)
- Pacific Coast Athletic Association men's basketball tournaments

1986–87 PCAA men's basketball standings
	Conf.				Overall
Team	W		L	PCT	W		L	PCT
No. 1 UNLV †	18	–	0	1.000	37	–	2	.949
UC Santa Barbara	10	–	8	.556	16	–	12	.571
San Jose State	10	–	8	.556	16	–	14	.533
Cal State Fullerton	9	–	9	.500	17	–	13	.567
New Mexico State	9	–	9	.500	15	–	15	.500
UC Irvine	9	–	9	.500	14	–	14	.500
Utah State	8	–	10	.444	15	–	16	.484
Long Beach State	7	–	11	.389	10	–	17	.370
Pacific	6	–	12	.333	10	–	17	.370
Fresno State	4	–	14	.222	9	–	20	.310
† 1987 PCAA tournament winner Rankings from AP poll

The 1987 Pacific Coast Athletic Association men's basketball tournament (now known as the Big West Conference men's basketball tournament) was held March 5–7 at The Forum in Inglewood, California.

Top-seeded, two-time defending champions UNLV defeated San José State in the final, 94–69, and captured their fourth PCAA/Big West championship (and fourth in five seasons).

The Runnin' Rebels, in turn, received a bid to the 1987 NCAA tournament, where they advanced to the Final Four.

== Format ==
The tournament field remained the same as 1986, with eight total teams. Again, only the top eight teams, out of ten, from the regular season standings qualified for the tournament.

All eight participating teams were placed into the first round, with teams seeded and paired based on regular-season records. After the first round, teams were re-seeded so the highest-remaining team was paired with the lowest-remaining time in one semifinal with the other two teams slotted into the other semifinal.

== Bracket ==
First round Thursday, March 5
1	#1 UNLV	105
8	Long Beach State	70
5	Cal State Fullerton	92
4	UC Irvine	81
(Pairings are reseeded after the first round)
3	San José State	71
6	New Mexico State	54
7	Utah State	79
2	UC Santa Barbara	87

Semifinals; Friday, March 6
1	#1 UNLV	99
5	Cal State Fullerton	65
2	UC Santa Barbara	69
3	San José State	70

Championship; Saturday, March 7
1	#1 UNLV	94
3	San José State	69
