= 1986 Maui Invitational =

1986 Maui Invitational Tournament
- Season: 1986–87
- Teams: 8
- Finals site: Lahaina Civic Center; Maui, Hawaii
- Champions: Vanderbilt (1st title)
- Runner-up: New Mexico (1st title game)
- Semifinalists: Missouri; Long Beach State
- Winning coach: C. M. Newton (1st title)
- MVP: Will Perdue (Vanderbilt)

The 1986 Maui Invitational Tournament was an early-season college basketball tournament that was played, for the 3rd time (and first in the 8-team bracket format), from November 28 to November 30, 1986. The tournament, which began two years prior in 1984, was part of the 1986-87 NCAA Division I men's basketball season. The tournament was played at the Lahaina Civic Center in Maui, Hawaii and was won by the Vanderbilt Commodores. It was the first title for the program and its head coach C. M. Newton.

== Bracket ==
5th Place Game; Sunday, November 30
UNC Charlotte	87
VCU	75
7th Place Game
Chaminade	54
Arkansas State	69

Consolation 2nd Round; Saturday, November 29
Chaminade	55
UNC Charlotte	79
Arkansas State	57
VCU	65

First Round; Friday, November 28
Chaminade	67
Long Beach State	70
UNC Charlotte	72
New Mexico	74
Arkansas State	63
Missouri	79
VCU	67
Vanderbilt	75

Semifinals; Saturday, November 29
Long Beach State	88
New Mexico	92
Missouri	54
Vanderbilt	69

Championship; Sunday, November 30
New Mexico	81
Vanderbilt	87
3rd Place Game
Long Beach State	68
Missouri	71
