= Eddie Fogler =

American basketball player and coach

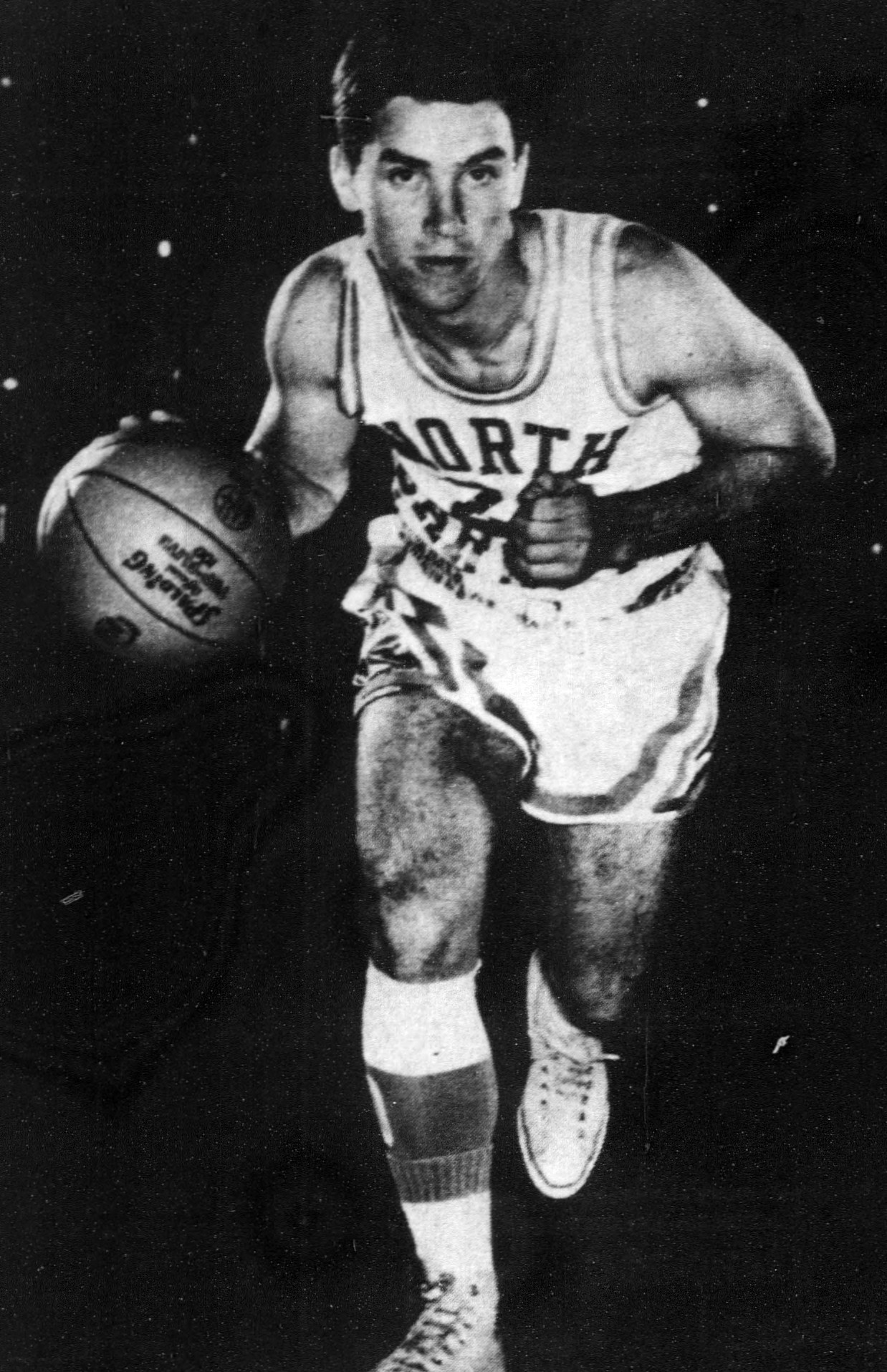
- Fogler, circa 1968

Biographical details
- Born: June 12, 1948 (age 78); Queens, New York, U.S.

Playing career
- 1967–1970: North Carolina
- Position: Point guard

Coaching career (HC unless noted)
- 1970–1971: DeMatha Catholic HS (assistant)
- 1971–1986: North Carolina (assistant)
- 1986–1989: Wichita State
- 1989–1993: Vanderbilt
- 1993–2001: South Carolina

Head coaching record
- Overall: 265–197
- Tournaments: 2–6 (NCAA Division I); 8–4 (NIT)

Accomplishments and honors

Championships
- NIT (1990); MVC tournament (1987); 2 SEC regular season (1993, 1997)

Awards
- Henry Iba Award (1993); AP Coach of the Year (1993); NABC Coach of the Year (1993); Sporting News Coach of the Year (1993); UPI Coach of the Year (1993); MVC Coach of the Year (1987); 2× SEC Coach of the Year (1993, 1997); Fourth-team Parade All-American (1966)

Eddie Fogler (born June 12, 1948) is an American former college basketball player and coach. He played for the University of North Carolina from 1967 to 1970 where he played as a point guard on two NCAA Final Four teams. Fogler was an All-City guard at Flushing High School in Flushing, New York.

== Background ==
“I was a pretty good high school player growing up and did pretty well,” said Fogler. “North Carolina always had a tradition of looking in New York for players from Coach (Frank) McGuire who passed that down to Coach Smith. “I went to a summer camp in North Carolina before my senior year. I loved it and they felt I might be good enough to help their program. It worked out for me to become a student-athlete at Chapel Hill in 1966–1970. We played freshman ball and my freshman coach was Larry Brown.” As a junior, Fogler was a solid starter at guard and the Tar Heels reached the Final Four again as ACC Champions and ACC Tournament champions finishing with a 27–5 record. North Carolina lost in a semifinals game to Purdue (92–65) who was led by All-American Rick Mount.

After graduating from UNC with a degree in Mathematics, Fogler spent the next year teaching and coaching at DeMatha Catholic High School in Hyattsville, Maryland, under prep legend Morgan Wootten. After one year in Hyattsville, Fogler would return to Chapel Hill as a graduate assistant for two seasons under Smith. He would spend 15 years as a Tar Heel assistant where the university won eight ACC Championships, five ACC Tournament Titles and made the Final Four four times with a national title in 1982 over Georgetown. Coaching for his mentor Smith was an experience of a lifetime for a young college coach.

Fogler served as an assistant college basketball coach at UNC and then served as the head basketball coach at Wichita State University, Vanderbilt University, and University of South Carolina.

From 1986 to 1989, he served as head coach at Wichita State University where he compiled a 61–32 (.656) record which included two NCAA Tournament appearances and one NIT berth for the Shockers.

From 1989 to 1994, Fogler served as the head coach at Vanderbilt where his Commodores compiled an 81–48 record. His 1989–90 team captured the NIT Championship with a 74–72 victory over St. Louis University. His 1992–93 team was ranked as high as #5 in the country and finished 28–6, including a 14–2 record in the SEC, a trip to the NCAA Tournament's "Sweet Sixteen", and he was named National Coach of the Year after winning the SEC championship. In the four years that he coached Vanderbilt, the Commodores achieved two NIT berths and two NCAA Tournament bids. Fogler's move from Vanderbilt to South Carolina, following the success of the team's 1992–93 season, left many Vanderbilt fans embittered toward the school's Athletic Director, Paul Hoolahan, and his handling of the matter.

From 1994 to 2001, Fogler coached at South Carolina. He coached the Gamecocks to two NCAA Tournament appearances. His best team was the 1996–97 unit, which went 15–1 in conference play to win the school's only outright Southeastern Conference title, while finishing sixth in the final AP Poll—the highest final ranking in school history. That team, however, was upset by Coppin State in the first round. The Gamecocks were seeded second in the East Regional, their highest-ever seeding in an NCAA Tournament; their defeat at the hands of Coppin State was only the third time a #2 seed had lost in the first round. The following year, the Gamecocks battled back for 23 wins and a 3-seed in the NCAA tournament, but fell again in the first round to 14th-seeded Richmond by a point. South Carolina did not achieve another winning record during his tenure, and he retired after the 2000–01 season, having compiled a 123–117 (.513) overall record at South Carolina in 8 seasons. Commenting after his final game as a head coach, Fogler stated "It is very difficult with college athletics being the way it is today and the pressures. You are darned if you do, darned if you don't," Fogler said. "I'm leaving college basketball with my dignity, my integrity and my sanity."

Fogler now serves as an analyst for Fox Sports Network, guest hosts a one-hour, weekly, NCAA Basketball show on WGFX "104.5 FM The Zone" (sports talk) in Nashville, Tennessee, serves as an advisor to schools seeking new basketball coaches, and resides in Elgin, South Carolina with his wife, Robin, daughter, Emma, and son, Ben.

== Head coaching record ==
Record table
Season	Team	Overall	Conference	Standing	Postseason
Wichita State Shockers (Missouri Valley Conference) (1986–1989)
1986–87	Wichita State	22–11	9–5	3rd	NCAA Division I First Round
1987–88	Wichita State	20–10	11–3	2nd	NCAA Division I First Round
1988–89	Wichita State	19–11	10–4	T–2nd	NIT Second Round
Wichita State:		61–32	30–12		
Vanderbilt Commodores (Southeastern Conference) (1989–1993)
1989–90	Vanderbilt	21–14	7–11	T–8th	NIT Champion
1990–91	Vanderbilt	17–13	11–7	5th	NCAA Division I First Round
1991–92	Vanderbilt	15–15	6–10	5th (East)	NIT First Round
1992–93	Vanderbilt	28–6	14–2	1st (East)	NCAA Division I Sweet 16
Vanderbilt:		81–48	38–30		
South Carolina Gamecocks (Southeastern Conference) (1993–2001)
1993–94	South Carolina	9–19	4–12	5th (East)	
1994–95	South Carolina	10–17	5–11	5th (East)	
1995–96	South Carolina	19–12	8–8	3rd (East)	NIT Quarterfinal
1996–97	South Carolina	24–8	15–1	1st (East)	NCAA Division I First Round
1997–98	South Carolina	23–8	11–5	2nd (East)	NCAA Division I First Round
1998–99	South Carolina	8–21	3–13	6th (East)	
1999–00	South Carolina	15–17	5–11	5th (East)	
2000–01	South Carolina	15–15	6–10	5th (East)	NIT First Round
South Carolina:		123–117	57–71		
Total:		265–197			
National champion Postseason invitational champion Conference regular season champion Conference regular season and conference tournament champion Division regular season champion Division regular season and conference tournament champion Conference tournament champion
