= Freddie Banks =

American basketball player (born 1965)

Personal information
- Born: March 6, 1965 (age 61) Las Vegas, Nevada, U.S.
- Listed height: 6 ft 2 in (1.88 m)
- Listed weight: 185 lb (84 kg)

Career information
- High school: Valley (Las Vegas, Nevada)
- College: UNLV (1983–1987)
- NBA draft: 1987: 2nd round, 24th overall pick
- Drafted by: Detroit Pistons
- Playing career: 1987–1991
- Position: Point guard / shooting guard
- Number: 13

Career history
- 1987: Mississippi Jets
- 1988–1991: San Jose Jammers

Career highlights
- 2× First-team All-PCAA (1986, 1987); PCAA tournament MVP (1987); No. 13 retired by UNLV Runnin' Rebels; McDonald's All-American (1983)
- Stats at Basketball Reference

Freddie Banks (born March 6, 1965) is an American former collegiate and professional basketball player. Banks played college basketball for the UNLV Runnin' Rebels and is a member of the UNLV Athletics Hall of Fame. Banks was the first pick of the second round (24th pick overall) of the 1987 NBA draft by the Detroit Pistons.

== Early life ==
Banks attended Valley High School in Las Vegas, where he was a 1983 McDonald's All-American

== College career ==
Banks chose to stay home to attend and play collegiate basketball at the University of Nevada-Las Vegas under Hall of Fame Coach Jerry Tarkanian. Banks played for UNLV from 1983 to 1987 and helped lead the Rebels to the 1987 Final Four.

As a Senior in 1986–1987 Banks averaged 19.5 points per game, alongside teammates Armen Gilliam and Gerald Paddio in leading the UNLV Runnin' Rebels to a 37–2 record and the 1987 NCAA Division I men's basketball tournament Final 4. Banks scored 38 points and hit 10 3-point shots in his final game, a 97–93 loss to the eventual Champion Indiana Hoosiers in the semi-final game. “He was the most clutch shooter I ever coached,” UNLV Coach Jerry Tarkanian said. Overall, Banks averaged 13.7 points, 3.5 assists and 2.2 rebounds in his 144-game UNLV career, making 42% of his 3-point shots and scoring 2,007 career points.

== Professional career ==
A 6' 2" Guard, Banks was selected 23rd overall by the Detroit Pistons in the 1987 NBA draft. Banks then played in the Continental Basketball Association for the Mississippi Jets and San Jose Jammers, in the World Basketball League (6'5" and under) for the Las Vegas Silver Streaks and in Greece.

== Personal ==
As of 2023, Banks was Head Boys' Basketball Coach at Canyon Springs High School, in Las Vegas. Banks has a wife and seven children.

At his UNLV Hall of Fame induction, Banks said: "It really is an honor. I feel really blessed to be a hometown kid that got to play for coach Tarkanian and win so many games here. For those of you who watched me during my fours at UNLV, just remember, Freddie Banks is still behind that three-point line."

== Honors ==
Banks was inducted into the UNLV Athletics Hall of Fame on February 7, 2005.

In 2010, Banks was also inducted into the Southern Nevada Sports Hall of Fame.

On Saturday, November 27, 2021, Banks had his number 13 jersey retired during halftime of UNLV's game against UCLA.
