= 1986–87 Illinois State Redbirds men's basketball team =

American college basketball season

1986–87 Illinois State Redbirds men's basketball

NIT, Quarterfinal
- Conference: Missouri Valley Conference
- Record: 19–13 (7–7 MVC)
- Head coach: Bob Donewald (9th season)
- Assistant coaches: Pat Cunningham; Anthony Jones; Bill Zuiker; Dave Hall; Parker Laketa
- Home arena: Horton Field House

1986–87 Missouri Valley Conference men's basketball standings
	Conf.				Overall
Team	W		L	PCT	W		L	PCT
Tulsa	11	–	3	.786	22	–	8	.733
Bradley	10	–	4	.714	17	–	12	.586
Wichita State †	9	–	5	.643	22	–	11	.667
Illinois State	7	–	7	.500	19	–	13	.594
Drake	6	–	8	.429	17	–	14	.548
Southern Illinois	5	–	9	.357	12	–	17	.414
Indiana State	4	–	10	.286	9	–	20	.310
Creighton	4	–	10	.286	9	–	19	.321
† 1987 MVC tournament winner Rankings from AP Poll

The 1986–87 Illinois State Redbirds men's basketball team represented Illinois State University during the 1986–87 NCAA Division I men's basketball season. The Redbirds, led by ninth year head coach Bob Donewald, played their home games at Horton Field House and were a member of the Missouri Valley Conference.

The Redbirds finished the season 19–13, 7–7 in conference play to finish in fourth place. They were the number three seed in the Missouri Valley Conference tournament as Bradley University was on probation and therefore banned from postseason competition. They were victorious in a quarterfinal game versus Indiana State University and lost in a semifinal game versus Wichita State University.

The Redbirds received an at-large bid to the 1987 National Invitation Tournament. They defeated the University of Akron in the first round, Cleveland State University in the second round, and lost to the La Salle University in the quarterfinal round.

== Roster ==
1986–87 Illinois State Redbirds men's basketball team
Players
Coaches

Pos.	#	Name	Height	Weight	Year	Hometown
F	35	Derrick Sanders	6 ft 6 in (1.98 m)	205 lb (93 kg)	Sr	Chicago, IL
G	23	Jeff Harris	6 ft 4 in (1.93 m)	180 lb (82 kg)	Jr	Indianapolis, IN
F	45	Tony Holifield	6 ft 7 in (2.01 m)	212 lb (96 kg)	Jr	Oak Park, MI
F	32	Cliff Peterson	6 ft 8 in (2.03 m)	200 lb (91 kg)	Jr	Detroit, MI
G	34	Matt Taphorn	6 ft 5 in (1.96 m)	200 lb (91 kg)	Jr	Pekin, IL
G	10	Sean Morros	5 ft 10 in (1.78 m)	155 lb (70 kg)	So	Ridgefield, CT
C	53	Jon Pemberton (redshirt)	6 ft 9 in (2.06 m)	218 lb (99 kg)	So	Bloomingdale, IL
G	33	Todd Starks	6 ft 3 in (1.91 m)	175 lb (79 kg)	So	Fort Wayne, IN
F	42	Kevin DeCraene	6 ft 8 in (2.03 m)	220 lb (100 kg)	RS Fr	Granger, IN
G	25	Randy Blair	6 ft 3 in (1.91 m)	178 lb (81 kg)	Fr	Peoria, IL
F	52	Jarrod Coleman	6 ft 7 in (2.01 m)	200 lb (91 kg)	Fr	North Chicago, IL
G	43	Rickey Jackson	6 ft 5 in (1.96 m)	192 lb (87 kg)	Fr	Mount Morris, MI
F	44	Sonny Roberts	6 ft 7 in (2.01 m)	205 lb (93 kg)	Fr	South Beloit, IL
G	24	Sam Skarich	6 ft 5 in (1.96 m)	190 lb (86 kg)	Fr	St. Cloud, MN

Head coach

- Bob Donewald (Hanover)

Assistant coach(es)

- Pat Cunningham (Kalamazoo)
- Anthony Jones (Illinois State)
- Bill Zuiker (UW–Stevens Point)
- Dave Hall (Iowa)
- Parker Laketa (Kansas State)

Legend

- (C) Team captain
- (S) Suspended
- (I) Ineligible
- (W) Walk-on
- Injured
- Current redshirt

== Schedule ==
Date time, TV	Rank^{#}	Opponent^{#}	Result	Record	High points	High rebounds	High assists	Site (attendance) city, state
Exhibition Season
November 19, 1986*; 7:30 pm		Bulgaria National "B"	W 77–74		22 – Sanders	–	–	Horton Field House; Normal, IL
Regular Season
November 29, 1986*; 7:30 pm		Wisconsin–Green Bay	W 63–44	1–0	24 – Sanders	9 – Sanders	–	Horton Field House (6,876); Normal, IL
December 1, 1986*; 8:00 pm, SportsVision		at No. 4 Purdue	L 54–96	1–1	11 – Sanders, Peterson	6 – Peterson	–	Mackey Arena (14,123); West Lafayette, IN
December 6, 1986*; 2:30 pm, WGN		DePaul	L 53–61	1–2	24 – Sanders	15 – Sanders	–	Horton Field House (7,628); Normal, IL
December 13, 1986*; 7:35 pm		at Saint Louis	W 80–69	2–2	16 – Sanders, Taphorn, Starks	7 – Holifield, Peterson	–	Kiel Auditorium (6,348); St. Louis, MO
December 15, 1986*; 7:30 pm		Armstrong State	W 90–69	3–2	25 – Harris	11 – Holifield	–	Horton Field House (4,005); Normal, IL
December 19, 1986*		vs. Kansas State; Music City Invitational [Semifinal]	L 86–87 ^{OT}	3–3	22 – Harris	11 – Sanders	–	Memorial Gymnasium (6,559); Nashville, TN
December 20, 1986*; 6:00 pm		vs. Tennessee Tech; Music City Invitational [Third Place]	W 101–84	4–3	24 – Holifield	9 – Holifield	–	Memorial Gymnasium (7,016); Nashville, TN
December 26, 1986*		vs. Fresno State; Hoosier Classic [Semifinal]	W 60–44	5–3	16 – Sanders	8 – Holifield	–	Market Square Arena (15,976); Indianapolis, IN
December 27, 1986*; 9:00 pm		vs. No. 4 Indiana; Hoosier Classic [Final]	L 58–82	5–4	13 – Sanders	9 – Sanders	–	Market Square Arena (16,585); Indianapolis, IN
December 30, 1986*; 7:30 pm		Southwest Missouri State	W 59–55	6–4	25 – Sanders	11 – Peterson	–	Horton Field House (5,603); Normal, IL
January 3, 1987*; 1:00 pm		at Iowa State	W 61–59	7–4	17 – Harris	8 – Peterson	–	James H. Hilton Coliseum (14,010); Ames, IA
January 8, 1987; 7:35 pm		at Drake	L 52–53	7–5 (0–1)	17 – Sanders	11 – Holifield	–	Veterans Memorial Auditorium (7,250); Des Moines, IA
January 10, 1987; 2:30 pm		Indiana State	W 86–57	8–5 (1–1)	16 – Harris	9 – Sanders	–	Horton Field House (5,538); Normal, IL
January 12, 1987; 7:35 pm		at Southern Illinois	W 81–70	9–5 (2–1)	24 – Sanders	9 – Holifield	5 – Peterson	SIU Arena (2,724); Carbondale, IL
January 15, 1987; 7:35 pm		at Creighton	W 70–61	10–5 (3–1)	25 – Harris	10 – Holifield	10 – Starks	Omaha Civic Auditorium (5,378); Omaha, NE
January 19, 1987; 7:30 pm, WHOI		Bradley	L 65–73	10–6 (3–2)	–	–	–	Horton Field House (7,745); Normal, IL
January 22, 1987; 7:35 pm		at Tulsa	L 69-71	10–7 (3–3)	–	–	–	Tulsa Convention Center (7,565); Tulsa, OK
January 24, 1987; 2:00 pm		at Wichita State	L 57–66	10–8 (3–4)	16 – Holifield	8 – Sanders	6 – Starks	Henry Levitt Arena (8,976); Wichita, KS
January 29, 1987; 7:30 pm		Drake	W 52–50	11–8 (4–4)	–	–	–	Horton Field House (5,898); Normal, IL
January 31, 1987; 12:00 pm		Southern Illinois	L 73–76	11–9 (4–5)	24 – Harris	17 – Sanders	6 – Starks	Horton Field House (6,406); Normal, IL
February 2, 1987*; 8:15 pm, SportsVision		at Illinois–Chicago	W 94–85	12–9	–	–	–	UIC Pavilion (2,149); Chicago, IL
February 8, 1987; 11:00 am		at Indiana State	L 73–74	12–10 (4–6)	–	–	–	Hulman Center (3,909); Terre Haute, IN
February 12, 1987; 7:30 pm		Wichita State	W 66–63	13–10 (5–6)	16 – Harris	6 – Holifield	9 – Starks	Horton Field House (6,095); Normal, IL
February 15, 1987; 3:05 pm		Tulsa	W 75–70	14–10 (6–6)	–	–	–	Horton Field House (6,538); Normal, IL
February 18, 1987; 9:00 pm, ESPN		at Bradley	L 81–93	14–11 (6–7)	–	–	–	Carver Arena (10,401); Peoria, IL
February 21, 1987*; 2:30 pm		Chicago State	W 82–65	15–11	–	–	–	Horton Field House (7,520); Normal, IL
February 26, 1987; 7:30 pm		Creighton	W 83–68	16–11 (7–7)	26 – Harris	–	8 – Starks	Horton Field House (7,231); Normal, IL
Missouri Valley Conference {MVC} tournament
February 28, 1987	(3)	(6) Indiana State; Quarterfinal	W 70–55	17–11	26 – Coleman	10 – Holifield	12 – Starks	Horton Field House (3,898); Normal, IL
March 1, 1987	(3)	at (2) Wichita State; Semifinal	L 53–56	17–12	22 – Holifield	10 – Peterson	9 – Starks	Henry Levitt Arena (6,572); Wichita, KS
National Invitation {NIT} tournament
March 12, 1987		Akron; First Round	W 59–52	18–12	23 – Holifield	9 – Sanders	11 – Starks	Horton Field House (4,115); Normal, IL
March 16, 1987		at Cleveland State; Second Round	W 79–77	19–12	27 – Sanders	10 – Sanders, Peterson	7 – Starks	Woodling Gymnasium (7,443); Cleveland, OH
March 18, 1987		at La Salle; Quarterfinal	L 50–70	19–13	26 – Sanders	8 – Sanders	6 – Starks	The Palestra (4,128); Philadelphia, PA
*Non-conference game. ^{#}Rankings from AP Poll. (#) Tournament seedings in parentheses. All times are in Central Standard Time.
