= Ahearn Field House =

Sports venue in Manhattan, Kansas

Coordinates: 39°11′20.4″N 96°35′02.5″W

Mike Ahearn Field House
- "The Old Barn"
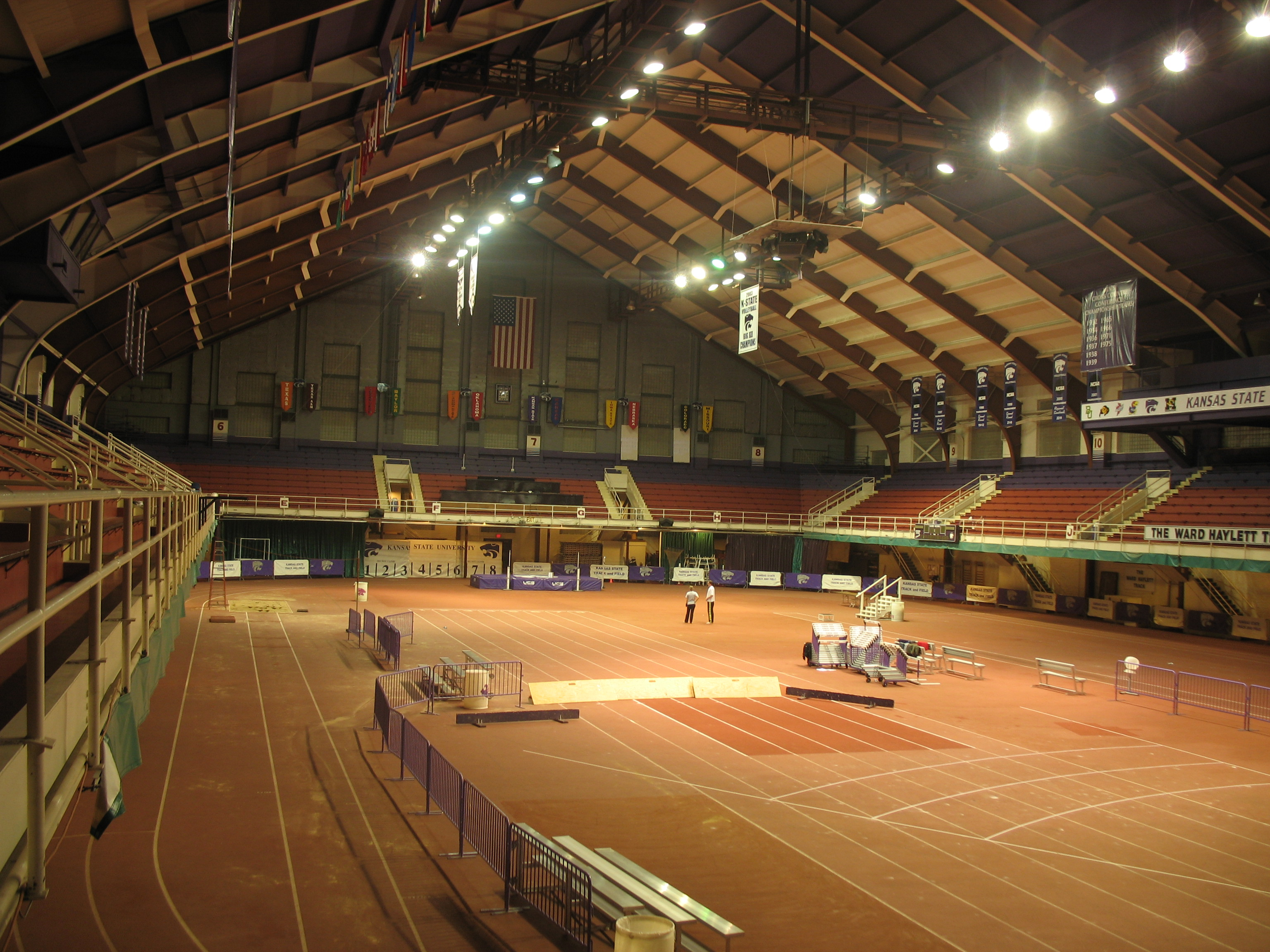
- Interactive map of Mike Ahearn Field House
- Location: 1700 College Heights Road; Manhattan, Kansas 66506
- Owner: Kansas State University
- Operator: Kansas State University
- Capacity: 5,000 (volleyball); 12,220 (basketball, 1987)
- Record attendance: 5,287 (volleyball, 2003); 14,028 (basketball, 1951)

Construction
- Groundbreaking: 1949
- Opened: December 9, 1950
- Cost: $2 million

Tenant
- Kansas State Wildcats

Ahearn Field House is one of the athletic buildings on the campus of Kansas State University in Manhattan, Kansas. It is the former home of the Wildcats men's basketball and volleyball teams and is currently home to the indoor track and field squad. It also houses facilities for the Department of Kinesiology and the Department of Intercollegiate Athletics.

The facility was named in honor of Michael F. "Mike" Ahearn. In 42 years at K-State, Ahearn served in a variety of roles, including as a coach, professor, Head of the Department of Physical Education, and Director of Athletics. Kansas State's men's basketball team posted an all-time record in Ahearn Field House of 369-96 (.793), including six undefeated seasons.

== History ==
By the late 1940s, it was obvious that Kansas State's 30-year-old gym, Nichols Hall, was inadequate for the increasingly popular basketball team. After the Wildcats advanced to the Final Four in 1948, it was not unheard of for students to climb into the rafters in order to watch the game. Not only was this situation uncomfortable, it was also unsafe. In the late-1940s, the Kansas State Legislature approved the construction of a new and much larger basketball facility, designed to overcome the capacity and safety shortcomings of Nichols Hall.

Opened in 1950 with a seating capacity of more than 14,000, Ahearn Field House was one of the first and largest purpose-built basketball arenas in the country. It was the largest arena in the state of Kansas until the construction of Allen Fieldhouse at the University of Kansas in 1955. Changing fire codes over the years forced changes to the seating arrangements that eventually reduced seating capacity to 12,220 for the 1987–1988 season, the final season of men's basketball at Ahearn.

Ahearn Field House hosted the men's NCAA basketball tournament regional finals six times (1953, 1955, 1960, 1962, 1965, and 1969). It also hosted the national championship match for the 1974 AIAW women's basketball tournament, as well as a quarterfinal game in the 1976 NIT.

Ahearn Field House provided a legendary homecourt advantage for K-State. Former Kansas State coach Tex Winter said in his biography Trial By Basketball: "Kansas State won a lot of ballgames because of that crowd. Many times during timeouts you couldn't hear yourself talk. All I could do was scribble a play on the floor. The crowd there never died, even in one of our lulls – the crowd would come alive and pick us up."

The total men's basketball attendance from 1950 to 1988 was over 4,839,796.

== Ahearn today ==
By the mid-1970s, it was obvious that the basketball team had outgrown Ahearn, and KSU administration decided that the basketball teams needed a new home. In 1979, KSU began raising money for what would become Bramlage Coliseum, which became the new home of the basketball teams in 1988.

Over the years Ahearn has been modified to accommodate a variety of other activities, ranging from additional classroom space to providing venues for other intercollegiate sports such as indoor track and field and volleyball. Ahearn has also hosted NCAA volleyball tournament games four times since 1996.

== See also ==
- David Smale, The Ahearn Tradition (1988)
- Mark Bender, Trial By Basketball: The Life and Times of Tex Winter (2000) ISBN 1-886110-90-5
