= Everett Gay =

American football player (born 1964)

No. 80
- Position: Wide receiver

Personal information
- Born: October 23, 1964 (age 62); Houston, Texas, U.S.
- Listed height: 6 ft 2 in (1.88 m)
- Listed weight: 209 lb (95 kg)

Career information
- High school: Wheatley (Houston)
- College: Texas
- NFL draft: 1987: 5th round, 124th overall pick

Career history
- Dallas Cowboys (1987–1988); Tampa Bay Buccaneers (1989); Cleveland Browns (1990)*
- * Offseason or practice squad member only

Career NFL statistics
- Receptions: 15
- Receiving yards: 205
- Touchdowns: 1
- Stats at Pro Football Reference

Everett Carlton Gay (born October 23, 1964) is an American former professional football player who was a wide receiver in the National Football League (NFL) for the Dallas Cowboys and Tampa Bay Buccaneers. He played college football at the Texas Longhorns.

== Early life ==
Gay attended Phillis Wheatley High School, where he was a basketball star. He earned the nickname "Little Glide" because of his acrobatic dunks while playing basketball with Clyde Drexler, Akeem Olajuwon and Moses Malone at the Fonde Recreation Center during the summer.

To avoid extra conditioning work, he went out for football as a senior and had a standout season. He also practiced track.

== College career ==
Gay accepted a football scholarship from the University of Texas at Austin. He played in a run-oriented offense that limited his productivity. As a sophomore, he was a backup wide receiver, making one reception for 17 yards. As a junior, he led the team with 22 receptions for 431 yards (19.6 yards per catch) and one touchdown.

As a senior, he missed two games, finishing third on the team with 26 receptions for 341 yards and one touchdown. In his college career, he posted 49 receptions for 789 yards and 2 touchdowns.

== Professional career ==
Pre-draft measurables
Height	Weight	Arm length	Hand span	40-yard dash	10-yard split	20-yard split	20-yard shuttle	Vertical jump	Broad jump	Bench press
6 ft 2 1/8 in (1.88 m)	204 lb (93 kg)	32 1/2 in (0.83 m)	10 1/2 in (0.27 m)	4.60 s	1.58 s	2.64 s	4.38 s	37.5 in (0.95 m)	10 ft 3 in (3.12 m)	2 reps
All values from NFL Combine

=== Dallas Cowboys ===
Gay was selected by the Dallas Cowboys in the fifth round (124th overall) of the 1987 NFL draft. As a rookie, he suffered a severe right ankle sprain in training camp and was placed on the injured reserve list.

In 1988, he was one of the early training camp surprises until suffering a knee injury on July 21 that required surgery. After undergoing arthroscopy surgery, he was able to return and play in all 16 games, registering 15 receptions for 205 yards and one touchdown.

In 1989, he missed the June minicamp after having arthroscopy surgery in his right knee, which contributed to a slow start. He was waived on August 22.

=== Tampa Bay Buccaneers ===
On August 23, 1989, he was signed as a free agent by the Tampa Bay Buccaneers. On August 30, he was cut after playing in the final two preseason games. On September 26, he was re-signed. On October 13, he was released to make room for quarterback Kerwin Bell.

=== Cleveland Browns ===
On February 27, 1990, he was signed by the Cleveland Browns. He was released before the start of the season.
