= 1984 Southwest Conference men's basketball tournament =

- Classification: Division I
- Season: 1983–84
- Teams: 9
- Site: The Summit; Houston, Texas
- Champions: Houston (4th title)
- Winning coach: Guy Lewis (4th title)
- MVP: Akeem Olajuwon (Houston)
- Television: NBC

1983–84 Southwest Conference men's basketball standings
	Conf.				Overall
Team	W		L	PCT	W		L	PCT
No. 5 Houston †	15	–	1	.938	32	–	5	.865
No. 8 Arkansas	14	–	2	.875	25	–	7	.781
SMU	12	–	4	.750	25	–	8	.758
Texas Tech	10	–	6	.625	17	–	12	.586
Texas A&M	7	–	9	.438	16	–	14	.533
Rice	6	–	10	.375	13	–	17	.433
TCU	4	–	12	.250	11	–	17	.393
Texas	3	–	13	.188	7	–	21	.250
Baylor	1	–	15	.063	5	–	23	.179
† 1984 SWC tournament winner Rankings from AP poll

The 1984 Southwest Conference men's basketball tournament was held March 9–11, 1984 at The Summit in Houston, Texas. The first round took place March 6 at the higher seeded campus sites.

Number 1 seed Houston defeated 2 seed Arkansas 57-56 to win their 4th championship and receive the conference's automatic bid to the 1984 NCAA tournament.

== Format and seeding ==
The tournament consisted of 9 teams in a single-elimination tournament. The 3 seed received a bye to the Quarterfinals and the 1 and 2 seed received a bye to the Semifinals.

Place	Seed	Team	Conference			Overall		
Place	Seed	Team	W	L	%	W	L	%
1	1	Houston	15	1	.938	32	5	.865
2	2	Arkansas	14	2	.875	25	7	.781
3	3	SMU	12	4	.750	25	8	.758
4	4	Texas Tech	10	6	.625	17	12	.586
5	5	Texas A&M	7	9	.438	16	14	.533
6	6	Rice	6	10	.375	13	17	.433
7	7	TCU	4	12	.250	11	17	.393
8	8	Texas	3	13	.188	7	21	.250
9	9	Baylor	1	15	.063	5	23	.179

== Tournament ==
Date	Winner	Score	Loser	Notes
First Round
Mar 6	6 Rice	64-52	7 TCU	at Rice
Mar 6	4 Texas Tech	63-48	9 Baylor	at Texas Tech
Mar 6	5 Texas A&M	75-54	8 Texas	at Texas A&M
Quarterfinals
Mar 9	6 Rice	53-48	4 Texas Tech	
Mar 9	5 Texas A&M	59-57	3 SMU	
Semifinals
Mar 10	1 Houston	53-50	6 Rice	
Mar 10	2 Arkansas	49-47	5 Texas A&M	
Finals
Mar 11	1 Houston	57-56	2 Arkansas	
