= 1984 SEC men's basketball tournament =

Annual college basketball tournament

- Classification: Division I
- Season: 1983–84
- Teams: 10
- Site: Memorial Gymnasium; Nashville, Tennessee
- Champions: Kentucky (14th title)
- Winning coach: Joe B. Hall (1st title)
- MVP: Charles Barkley (Auburn)
- Attendance: 136,046 (sellout)
- Television: Sports Productions, Inc. (Entire tournament); NBC (Championship game coverage outside the SEC footprint)

1983–84 Southeastern Conference men's basketball standings
	Conf.				Overall
Team	W		L	PCT	W		L	PCT
No. 3 Kentucky †	14	–	4	.778	29	–	5	.853
Auburn	12	–	6	.667	20	–	11	.645
Florida	11	–	7	.611	16	–	13	.552
LSU	11	–	7	.611	18	–	11	.621
Alabama	10	–	8	.556	18	–	12	.600
Tennessee	9	–	9	.500	21	–	14	.600
Vanderbilt	8	–	10	.444	14	–	15	.483
Georgia	8	–	10	.444	17	–	13	.567
Mississippi State	4	–	14	.222	9	–	19	.321
Ole Miss	3	–	15	.167	8	–	20	.286
† 1984 SEC tournament winner Rankings from AP Poll

The 1984 SEC Men’s Basketball Tournament took place from March 7–10, 1984 at the Memorial Gymnasium on Vanderbilt University’s campus located in Nashville, Tennessee. The Kentucky Wildcats won the tournament and received the SEC's automatic bid to the 1984 NCAA Division I Men’s Basketball tournament by defeating the Auburn Tigers by a score of 51–49 in the championship game on March 10. Kentucky’s tournament championship win marked the first time a regular season champion won the tournament championship since the revival of the SEC Tournament in 1979.

== Television coverage ==
Television coverage of the entire tournament was produced and regionally syndicated by the now-defunct Sports Productions, Inc. (SPI), a division of Lorimar Productions. The broadcast crew consisted of Tom Hammond with the play-by-play announcing, and Joe Dean with the color analogy. However, the championship game on Sunday, March 10, was televised by NBC in areas outside the SEC’s geographical footprint (with Don Criqui and Bucky Waters calling the action.), with the SPI broadcast being shown within the SEC footprint.

== Bracket ==
First Round; Wednesday, March 7 Sports Productions, Inc.
8	Georgia	52
9	Mississippi State	49
7	Vanderbilt	77
10	Ole Miss	57

Second Round; Thursday, March 8 SPI
1	#3 Kentucky	92
8	Georgia	79
4	LSU	70^{OT}
5	Alabama	72
2	Auburn	59
7	Vanderbilt	58
3	Florida	74
6	Tennessee	80

Semi-Finals; Friday, March 9 SPI
1	#3 Kentucky	48
5	Alabama	46
2	Auburn	60
6	Tennessee	58

Finals; Saturday, March 10; SPI, NBC
1	#3 Kentucky	51
2	Auburn	49
