= 1983–84 Houston Cougars men's basketball team =

American college basketball season

1983–84 Houston Cougars men's basketball
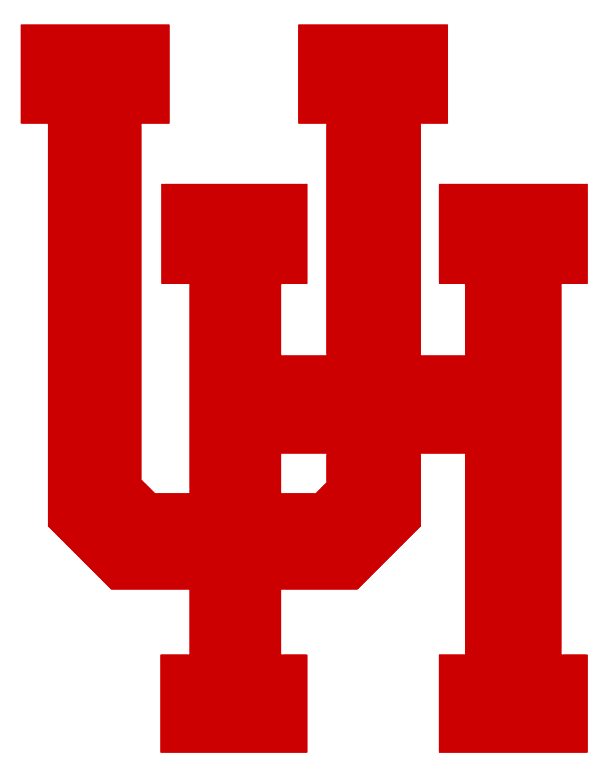

NCAA tournament, Runner-up SWC tournament champions SWC regular season champions

National Championship Game, L 75–84 vs. Georgetown
- Conference: Southwest Conference

Ranking
- Coaches: No. 5
- AP: No. 5
- Record: 32–5 (15–1 SWC)
- Head coach: Guy Lewis (28th season)
- Assistant coaches: Terry Kirkpatrick; Don Schverak
- Home arena: Hofheinz Pavilion

1983–84 Southwest Conference men's basketball standings
	Conf.				Overall
Team	W		L	PCT	W		L	PCT
No. 5 Houston †	15	–	1	.938	32	–	5	.865
No. 8 Arkansas	14	–	2	.875	25	–	7	.781
SMU	12	–	4	.750	25	–	8	.758
Texas Tech	10	–	6	.625	17	–	12	.586
Texas A&M	7	–	9	.438	16	–	14	.533
Rice	6	–	10	.375	13	–	17	.433
TCU	4	–	12	.250	11	–	17	.393
Texas	3	–	13	.188	7	–	21	.250
Baylor	1	–	15	.063	5	–	23	.179
† 1984 SWC tournament winner Rankings from AP poll

The 1983–84 Houston Cougars men's basketball team represented the University of Houston during the 1983–84 NCAA Division I men's basketball season. The head coach was Guy Lewis. The team played its home games in the Hofheinz Pavilion in Houston, Texas, and was then a member of the Southwest Conference.

The third of Houston's famous Phi Slama Jama teams, this squad was led by Michael Young, Alvin Franklin, and future Hall of Famer Akeem Olajuwon. The Cougars played in the Final Four for the third consecutive season, appeared in their second straight National Championship Game, and completed a three-year run with an overall record of 88–16.

The next Cougar season to end with a national title game appearance would come 41 years later, though their next Final Four appearance would be four years before that.

== Roster ==
1983–84 Houston Cougars men's basketball team
Players
Coaches

Pos.	#	Name	Height	Weight	Year	Previous school	Hometown
G/F	22	Marvin Alexander	6 ft 4 in (1.93 m)	190 lb (86 kg)	Jr	Worthing HS	Houston, TX
G/F	32	Benny Anders	6 ft 5 in (1.96 m)	188 lb (85 kg)	Jr	Bernice HS	Bernice, LA
F/C	54	Greg Anderson	6 ft 9 in (2.06 m)	220 lb (100 kg)	Fr	Worthing HS	Houston, TX
F	50	Stacey Belcher	6 ft 6 in (1.98 m)	210 lb (95 kg)	Fr	Yates HS	Houston, TX
F	52	Braxton Clark	6 ft 8 in (2.03 m)	230 lb (104 kg)	Jr	De Anza College	San Francisco, CA
G	14	Eric Dickens	6 ft 1 in (1.85 m)	170 lb (77 kg)	Jr	Madison HS	Houston, TX
G	20	Alvin Franklin	6 ft 2 in (1.88 m)	185 lb (84 kg)	So	La Marque HS	La Marque, TX
G/F	44	Reid Gettys	6 ft 6 in (1.98 m)	200 lb (91 kg)	Jr	Memorial HS	Houston, TX
G	10	Derek Giles	6 ft 3 in (1.91 m)	175 lb (79 kg)	Sr	Bayside HS	Queens, NY
C	34	Akeem Olajuwon	7 ft 0 in (2.13 m)	255 lb (116 kg)	Jr	Muslim Teachers College	Lagos, Nigeria
F	30	Gary Orsak	6 ft 7 in (2.01 m)	220 lb (100 kg)	Jr	Alvin HS	Alvin, TX
G	12	Renaldo Thomas	6 ft 4 in (1.93 m)	200 lb (91 kg)	So	Roosevelt HS	Gary, IN
G	24	James Weaver	6 ft 4 in (1.93 m)	190 lb (86 kg)	Fr	Nederland HS	Nederland, TX
F	40	Rickie Winslow	6 ft 8 in (2.03 m)	215 lb (98 kg)	Fr	Yates HS	Houston, TX
F	42	Michael Young	6 ft 6 in (1.98 m)	210 lb (95 kg)	Sr	Yates HS	Houston, TX

Head coach

- Guy Lewis (Houston)

Assistant coach(es)

- Terry Kirkpatrick
- Don Schverak

Legend

- (C) Team captain
- (S) Suspended
- (I) Ineligible
- (W) Walk-on
- Injured
- Current redshirt

Roster
Last update: 2018-Mar-18

== Schedule and results ==
Date time, TV	Rank^{#}	Opponent^{#}	Result	Record	High points	High rebounds	High assists	Site (attendance) city, state
Regular season
November 19, 1983*	No. 3	vs. NC State; Hall of Fame Classic	L 64–76	0–1	20 – Young	–	–	Springfield Civic Center; Springfield, MA
November 26, 1983*	No. 3	No. 17 Kansas	W 91–76	1–1	–	–	–	Hofheinz Pavilion; Houston, TX
November 30, 1983*	No. 8	at Mississippi State	W 68–62	2–1	–	–	–	Humphrey Coliseum; Starkville, MS
December 3, 1983*	No. 8	Biscayne	W 69–51	3–1	19 – Anders	18 – Olajuwon	4 – Gettys	Hofheinz Pavilion; Houston, TX
December 6, 1983*	No. 6	at No. 9 LSU	W 100–91	4–1	–	–	–	LSU Assembly Center; Baton Rouge, LA
December 10, 1983*	No. 6	St. Mary's	W 71–55	5–1	–	–	–	Hofheinz Pavilion; Houston, TX
December 16, 1983*	No. 3	Stetson; Kettle Classic	W 92–71	6–1	–	–	–	Hofheinz Pavilion; Houston, TX
December 17, 1983*	No. 3	Princeton; Kettle Classic	W 65–40	7–1	–	–	–	Hofheinz Pavilion; Houston, TX
December 19, 1983*	No. 3	Texas Lutheran; Kettle Classic	W 129–65	8–1	–	–	–	Hofheinz Pavilion; Houston, TX
December 21, 1983*	No. 3	at UC Santa Barbara	W 89–79	9–1	–	–	–	Campus Events Center; Santa Barbara, California
December 25, 1983*	No. 3	vs. No. 10 Louisville; Chaminade Classic	W 76–73	10–1	–	–	–	Neal S. Blaisdell Center; Honolulu, HI
December 26, 1983*	No. 3	vs. Fresno State; Chaminade Classic	L 61–68	10–2	–	–	–	Neal S. Blaisdell Center; Honolulu, HI
January 5, 1984	No. 7	at SMU	W 60–59	11–2 (1–0)	–	–	–	Moody Coliseum; University Park, TX
January 7, 1984	No. 7	TCU	W 81–67	12–2 (2–0)	–	–	–	Hofheinz Pavilion; Houston, TX
January 10, 1984	No. 7	Texas	W 69–58	13–2 (3–0)	–	–	–	Hofheinz Pavilion; Houston, TX
January 12, 1984	No. 7	at Texas Tech	W 88–66	14–2 (4–0)	–	–	–	Lubbock Municipal Coliseum; Lubbock, TX
January 14, 1984	No. 7	at Texas A&M	W 70–64	15–2 (5–0)	–	–	–	G. Rollie White Coliseum; College Station, TX
January 20, 1984	No. 4	Rice	W 72–42	16–2 (6–0)	–	–	–	Hofheinz Pavilion; Houston, TX
January 22, 1984*	No. 4	at No. 3 Kentucky	L 67–74	16–3	–	–	–	Rupp Arena; Lexington, KY
January 28, 1984	No. 7	at Baylor	W 84–58	17–3 (7–0)	–	–	–	Heart O' Texas Coliseum; Waco, TX
February 2, 1984	No. 6	Texas A&M	W 87–65	18–3 (8–0)	–	–	–	Hofheinz Pavilion; Houston, TX
February 4, 1984	No. 6	SMU	W 76–57	19–3 (9–0)	–	–	–	Hofheinz Pavilion; Houston, TX
February 9, 1984	No. 5	at TCU	W 76–60	20–3 (10–0)	–	–	–	Daniel-Meyer Coliseum; Fort Worth, TX
February 11, 1984	No. 5	at Texas	W 74–63	21–3 (11–0)	–	–	–	Frank Erwin Center; Austin, TX
February 16, 1984	No. 4	Texas Tech	W 78–53	22–3 (12–0)	–	–	–	Hofheinz Pavilion; Houston, TX
February 18, 1984*	No. 4	Virginia	W 74–65	23–3	–	–	–	Hofheinz Pavilion; Houston, TX
February 22, 1984	No. 3	at Rice	W 70–54	24–3 (13–0)	–	–	–	Rice Gymnasium; Houston, TX
February 26, 1984	No. 3	No. 11 Arkansas	W 64–61	25–3 (14–0)	19 – Olajuwon	10 – Olajuwon	–	Hofheinz Pavilion; Houston, TX
February 29, 1984	No. 2	Baylor	W 80–65	26–3 (15–0)	–	–	–	Hofheinz Pavilion; Houston, TX
March 4, 1984	No. 2	at No. 12 Arkansas	L 68–73	26–4 (15–1)	22 – Young	6 – Olajuwon	3 – Tied	Barnhill Arena (9,438); Fayetteville, AR
SWC tournament
March 10, 1984*	(1) No. 5	vs. (6) Rice; Semifinals	W 53–50	27–4	–	–	–	The Summit; Houston, TX
March 11, 1984*	(1) No. 5	vs. (2) No. 8 Arkansas; Championship	W 57–56	28–4	23 – Young	11 – Olajuwon	12 – Gettys	The Summit (14,930); Houston, TX
NCAA tournament
March 17, 1984*	(2 MW) No. 5	vs. (10 MW) Louisiana Tech; Second round	W 77–69	29–4	21 – Franklin	12 – Olajuwon	4 – Tied	Mid-South Coliseum; Memphis, TN
March 23, 1984*	(2 MW) No. 5	vs. (6 MW) No. 16 Memphis State; Sweet Sixteen	W 78–71	30–4	25 – Olajuwon	13 – Olajuwon	9 – Gettys	St. Louis Arena; St. Louis, MO
March 25, 1984*	(2 MW) No. 5	vs. (4 MW) No. 19 Wake Forest; Elite Eight	W 68–63	31–4	29 – Olajuwon	12 – Olajuwon	10 – Gettys	St. Louis Arena; St. Louis, MO
March 31, 1984*	(2 MW) No. 5	(7 E) Virginia; Final Four	W 49–47 ^{OT}	32–4	17 – Young	11 – Olajuwon	7 – Franklin	Kingdome; Seattle, WA
April 2, 1984*; 8:12 p.m., CBS	(2 MW) No. 5	vs. (1 W) No. 2 Georgetown; National Championship	L 75–84	32–5	21 – Franklin	9 – Olajuwon	9 – Franklin	Kingdome (38,471); Seattle, WA
*Non-conference game. ^{#}Rankings from AP Poll. (#) Tournament seedings in parentheses. MW=Midwest region. E=East region. W=West region. All times are in Central Time.

== Rankings ==
Ranking movements Legend: ██ Increase in ranking ██ Decrease in ranking
	Week																
Poll	Pre	1	2	3	4	5	6	7	8	9	10	11	12	13	14	15	Final
AP	3	8	6	3	3	3	7	7	4	7	6	5	4	3	2	5	5
Coaches	Not released		6	3	3	3	5	5	5	6	5	4	4	3	2	5	5

== Awards and honors ==
- Akeem Olajuwon – Consensus First-team All-American, SWC Player of the Year
- Michael Young – Third-team All-American

== Team players drafted into the NBA ==
Year	Player	Round	Pick	NBA club
1984	Akeem Olajuwon	1	1	Houston Rockets
1984	Michael Young	1	24	Boston Celtics
1985	Reid Gettys	5	103	Chicago Bulls
1986	Alvin Franklin	4	80	Sacramento Kings
1987	Greg Anderson	1	23	San Antonio Spurs
1987	Rickie Winslow	2	28	Chicago Bulls
