= 1983–84 LSU Tigers basketball team =

American college basketball season

1983–84 LSU Tigers basketball

NCAA tournament
- Conference: Southeastern Conference
- West Division
- Record: 18–11 (11–7 SEC)
- Head coach: Dale Brown (12th season)
- Assistant coaches: Ron Abernathy (8th season); Bo Bahnsen
- Home arena: LSU Assembly Center

1983–84 Southeastern Conference men's basketball standings
	Conf.				Overall
Team	W		L	PCT	W		L	PCT
No. 3 Kentucky †	14	–	4	.778	29	–	5	.853
Auburn	12	–	6	.667	20	–	11	.645
Florida	11	–	7	.611	16	–	13	.552
LSU	11	–	7	.611	18	–	11	.621
Alabama	10	–	8	.556	18	–	12	.600
Tennessee	9	–	9	.500	21	–	14	.600
Vanderbilt	8	–	10	.444	14	–	15	.483
Georgia	8	–	10	.444	17	–	13	.567
Mississippi State	4	–	14	.222	9	–	19	.321
Ole Miss	3	–	15	.167	8	–	20	.286
† 1984 SEC tournament winner Rankings from AP Poll

The 1983-84 LSU Tigers men's basketball team represented Louisiana State University during the 1983–84 NCAA men's college basketball season. The head coach was Dale Brown. The team was a member of the Southeastern Conference and played their home games at LSU Assembly Center.

The Tigers finished tied for third place in the SEC regular season standings, and lost to Alabama (in OT) in the quarterfinals of the SEC Tournament. LSU received an at-large bid to the NCAA tournament as No. 7 seed in the West region where they lost in the opening round to Dayton. The team finished with an 18–11 record (11–7 SEC).

== Roster ==
1983–84 LSU Tigers men's basketball team
Players
Coaches

Pos.	#	Name	Height	Weight	Year	Previous school	Hometown
G	10	Derrick Taylor	6 ft 0 in (1.83 m)	185 lb (84 kg)	RS So	Redemptorist HS	Baton Rouge, LA
G	11	Anthony Wilson	6 ft 4 in (1.93 m)	192 lb (87 kg)	Fr	Plain Dealing HS	Plain Dealing, LA
G	12	Johnny Jones	6 ft 2 in (1.88 m)	170 lb (77 kg)	Sr	DeRidder, Louisiana
G	20	John Tudor	6 ft 6 in (1.98 m)	202 lb (92 kg)	Sr	Pineville HS	Pineville, Louisiana
G	21	Dennis Brown	6 ft 0 in (1.83 m)	169 lb (77 kg)	Fr	Woodlawn HS	Baton Rouge, LA
F	24	Leonard Mitchell	6 ft 7 in (2.01 m)	190 lb (86 kg)	Sr	St. Martinville, Louisiana
G	31	Oliver Brown	6 ft 6 in (1.98 m)	195 lb (88 kg)	Fr	University HS	Baton Rouge, LA
F/C	33	Steffond Johnson	6 ft 8 in (2.03 m)	212 lb (96 kg)	Jr	Longview HS	Longview, TX
F	35	Jerry Reynolds	6 ft 8 in (2.03 m)	198 lb (90 kg)	So	Alexander Hamilton HS	Brooklyn, NY
F	41	Nikita Wilson	6 ft 7 in (2.01 m)	200 lb (91 kg)	Fr	Leesville HS	Leesville, LA
G/F	44	Don Redden	6 ft 6 in (1.98 m)	213 lb (97 kg)	So	Ouachita HS	Monroe, LA

Head coach

- Dale Brown (Minot State)

Assistant coach(es)

Legend

- (C) Team captain
- (S) Suspended
- (I) Ineligible
- (W) Walk-on
- Injured
- Current redshirt

Roster

== Schedule and results ==
Date time, TV	Rank^{#}	Opponent^{#}	Result	Record	Site city, state
Exhibition
Non-conference regular season
Nov 26, 1983*	No. 11	at New Orleans	W 67–59	1–0	Lakefront Arena; New Orleans, Louisiana
Nov 28, 1983*	No. 12	at UNC Wilmington	W 94–59	2–0	Trask Coliseum; Wilmington, North Carolina
Dec 1, 1983*	No. 12	Washington	W 51–48	3–0	LSU Assembly Center; Baton Rouge, Louisiana
Dec 3, 1983*	No. 12	vs. Texas A&M	W 75–65	4–0	
Dec 6, 1983*	No. 9	No. 6 Houston	L 91–100	4–1	LSU Assembly Center; Baton Rouge, Louisiana
Dec 19, 1983*	No. 11	Houston Baptist	W 60–59	5–1	LSU Assembly Center (11,713); Baton Rouge, Louisiana
Dec 21, 1983*	No. 11	Texas-Rio Grande Valley	W 81–70	6–1	LSU Assembly Center; Baton Rouge, Louisiana
SEC regular season
Jan 1, 1984	No. 9	Vanderbilt	W 73–66	7–1 (1–0)	LSU Assembly Center; Baton Rouge, Louisiana
Jan 5, 1984	No. 9	at No. 11 Georgia	W 81–77	8–1 (2–0)	Stegeman Coliseum; Athens, Georgia
Jan 7, 1984	No. 9	No. 2 Kentucky	L 80–96	8–2 (2–1)	LSU Assembly Center; Baton Rouge, Louisiana
Jan 10, 1984	No. 11	at Tennessee	L 69–70	8–3 (2–2)	Stokely Athletic Center; Knoxville, Tennessee
Jan 14, 1984	No. 11	Ole Miss	W 93–70	9–3 (3–2)	LSU Assembly Center; Baton Rouge, Louisiana
Jan 16, 1984*	No. 15	U.S. International	W 104–66	10–3	LSU Assembly Center; Baton Rouge, Louisiana
Jan 21, 1984	No. 15	Alabama	W 85–84	11–3 (4–2)	LSU Assembly Center; Baton Rouge, Louisiana
Jan 23, 1984	No. 10	Mississippi State	W 80–64	12–3 (5–2)	LSU Assembly Center; Baton Rouge, Louisiana
Jan 27, 1984	No. 10	at Auburn	L 78–80	12–4 (5–3)	Beard–Eaves–Memorial Coliseum; Auburn, Alabama
Jan 29, 1984*	No. 10	at No. 1 North Carolina	L 79–90	12–5	Carmichael Auditorium; Chapel Hill, North Carolina
Feb 1, 1984	No. 14	at Florida	L 60–78	12–6 (5–4)	Stephen C. O'Connell Center; Gainesville, Florida
Feb 4, 1984	No. 14	Georgia	W 69–68	13–6 (6–4)	LSU Assembly Center; Baton Rouge, Louisiana
Feb 6, 1984	No. 20	Tennessee	W 61–59	14–6 (7–4)	LSU Assembly Center; Baton Rouge, Louisiana
Feb 12, 1984	No. 20	at Ole Miss	W 65–61	15–6 (8–4)	Tad Smith Coliseum; Oxford, Mississippi
Feb 17, 1984	No. 17	at Alabama	L 49–51	15–7 (8–5)	Coleman Coliseum; Tuscaloosa, Alabama
Feb 20, 1984		at Mississippi State	W 85–70	16–7 (9–5)	Humphrey Coliseum; Starkville, Mississippi
Feb 25, 1984		No. 19 Auburn	W 81–80	17–7 (10–5)	LSU Assembly Center; Baton Rouge, Louisiana
Feb 27, 1984		Florida	W 77–73	18–7 (11–5)	LSU Assembly Center; Baton Rouge, Louisiana
Mar 1, 1984		at Vanderbilt	L 68–74	18–8 (11–6)	Memorial Gymnasium; Nashville, Tennessee
Mar 3, 1984		at No. 3 Kentucky	L 68–90	18–9 (11–7)	Rupp Arena; Lexington, Kentucky
SEC Tournament
Mar 8, 1984*		vs. Alabama	L 70–72 ^{OT}	18–10	Memorial Gymnasium; Nashville, Tennessee
NCAA Tournament
Mar 15, 1984*	(7 W)	vs. (10 W) Dayton; First round	L 66–74	18–11	Jon M. Huntsman Center; Salt Lake City, Utah
*Non-conference game. ^{#}Rankings from AP Poll. (#) Tournament seedings in parentheses. W=West.
