= 1983–84 SMU Mustangs men's basketball team =

American college basketball season

1983–84 SMU Mustangs men's basketball

NCAA tournament, Second Round
- Conference: Southwest Conference
- Record: 25–8 (12–4 SWC)
- Head coach: Dave Bliss (4th season)
- Assistant coaches: Doug Ash; Paul Graham; John Underwood
- Home arena: Moody Coliseum

1983–84 Southwest Conference men's basketball standings
	Conf.				Overall
Team	W		L	PCT	W		L	PCT
No. 5 Houston †	15	–	1	.938	32	–	5	.865
No. 8 Arkansas	14	–	2	.875	25	–	7	.781
SMU	12	–	4	.750	25	–	8	.758
Texas Tech	10	–	6	.625	17	–	12	.586
Texas A&M	7	–	9	.438	16	–	14	.533
Rice	6	–	10	.375	13	–	17	.433
TCU	4	–	12	.250	11	–	17	.393
Texas	3	–	13	.188	7	–	21	.250
Baylor	1	–	15	.063	5	–	23	.179
† 1984 SWC tournament winner Rankings from AP poll

The 1983–84 SMU Mustangs men's basketball team represented Southern Methodist University as a member of the Southwest Conference during the 1983–84 men's college basketball season. The team was led by fourth-year head coach Dave Bliss and played their home games at Moody Coliseum.

== Roster ==
1984–85 SMU Mustangs men's basketball team
Players
Coaches

Pos.	#	Name	Height	Weight	Year	Previous school	Hometown
G	20	Butch Moore	5 ft 10 in (1.78 m)	—	So
F	42	Kevin Lewis	6 ft 6 in (1.98 m)	—	So
G	44	Carl Wright	6 ft 5 in (1.96 m)	—	So
C	53	Jon Koncak	7 ft 0 in (2.13 m)	240 lb (109 kg)	Jr	Center	Kansas City, Missouri
F	54	Larry Davis	6 ft 7 in (2.01 m)	—	Jr

Head coach

- Dave Bliss (Cornell)

Assistant coach(es)

- Doug Ash
- John Underwood
- Paul Graham

Legend

- (C) Team captain
- (S) Suspended
- (I) Ineligible
- (W) Walk-on
- Injured
- Current redshirt

Roster

== Schedule and results ==
Date time, TV	Rank^{#}	Opponent^{#}	Result	Record	Site city, state
Regular season
Nov 26, 1983*		St. Edward's	W 95–88	1–0	Moody Coliseum; Dallas, Texas
Nov 26, 1983*		Southwestern	W 90–71	2–0	Moody Coliseum; Dallas, Texas
Nov 30, 1983*		at Centenary	W 86–76	3–0	Gold Dome; Shreveport, Louisiana
Dec 3, 1983*		at Louisville	L 65–89	3–1	Freedom Hall; Louisville, Kentucky
Dec 6, 1983*		Penn	W 98–66	4–1	Moody Coliseum; Dallas, Texas
Dec 10, 1983*		Georgia State	W 92–67	5–1	Moody Coliseum; Dallas, Texas
Dec 16, 1983*		New Orleans; Dallas Morning News Classic	W 82–78	6–1	Reunion Arena; Dallas, Texas
Dec 17, 1983*		Centenary; Dallas Morning News Classic	W 85–64	7–1	Reunion Arena; Dallas, Texas
Dec 19, 1983*		U.S. International	W 91–70	8–1	Moody Coliseum; Dallas, Texas
Dec 22, 1983*		at Nevada-Las Vegas; Las Vegas Rebel Roundup	L 64–74	8–2	Thomas & Mack Center; Las Vegas, Nevada
Dec 23, 1983*		vs. James Madison; Las Vegas Rebel Roundup	W 56–53	9–2	Thomas & Mack Center; Las Vegas, Nevada
Dec 27, 1983*		vs. Duke; Rainbow Classic	W 78–76	10–2	Neal S. Blaisdell Center; Honolulu, Hawaii
Dec 28, 1983*		vs. Alabama-Birmingham; Rainbow Classic	W 77–63	11–2	Neal S. Blaisdell Center; Honolulu, Hawaii
Dec 29, 1983*		at Hawaii; Rainbow Classic	W 82–73	12–2	Neal S. Blaisdell Center; Honolulu, Hawaii
Jan 4, 1984*		No. 7 Houston	L 59–60	12–3 (0–1)	Moody Coliseum; Dallas, Texas
Jan 7, 1984		Rice	W 71–60	13–3 (1–1)	Moody Coliseum; Dallas, Texas
Jan 11, 1984		at Arkansas	L 69–70	13–4 (1–2)	Barnhill Arena; Fayetteville, Arkansas
Jan 14, 1984		at Baylor	W 89–70	14–4 (2–2)	Heart O' Texas Coliseum; Waco, Texas
Jan 19, 1984		Texas A&M	W 68–62	15–4 (3–2)	Moody Coliseum; Dallas, Texas
Jan 26, 1984		at Texas Christian	W 61–59	16–4 (4–2)	Daniel-Meyer Coliseum; Fort Worth, Texas
Jan 28, 1984		Texas	W 105–81	17–4 (5–2)	Moody Coliseum; Dallas, Texas
Feb 1, 1984		Texas Tech	W 70–60	18–4 (6–2)	Moody Coliseum; Dallas, Texas
Feb 4, 1984		at No. 6 Houston	L 57–76	18–5 (6–3)	Hofheinz Pavilion; Houston, Texas
Feb 8, 1984		at Rice	W 58–54	19–5 (7–3)	Tudor Fieldhouse; Houston, Texas
Feb 11, 1984		Arkansas	L 71–80	19–6 (7–4)	Moody Coliseum; Dallas, Texas
Feb 15, 1984		Baylor	W 74–57	20–6 (8–4)	Moody Coliseum; Dallas, Texas
Feb 18, 1984		at Texas A&M	W 60–58	21–6 (9–4)	G. Rollie White Coliseum; College Station, Texas
Feb 25, 1984		Texas Christian	W 73–65	22–6 (10–4)	Moody Coliseum; Dallas, Texas
Mar 1, 1984		at Texas	W 86–78	23–6 (11–4)	Frank Erwin Center; Austin, Texas
Mar 3, 1984		at Texas Tech	W 103–72	24–6 (12–4)	Lubbock Municipal Coliseum; Lubbock, Texas
Southwest Conference tournament
Mar 9, 1984*	(3)	vs. (5) Texas A&M; Quarterfinals	L 57–59	24–7	Hofheinz Pavilion; Houston, Texas
1985 NCAA tournament
Mar 16, 1984*	(8 W)	vs. (9 W) Miami (OH); First round	W 83–69	25–7	Friel Court; Pullman, Washington
Mar 18, 1984*; 3:30 pm, CBS	(8 W)	vs. (1 W) No. 2 Georgetown; Second round	L 36–37	25–8	Friel Court (11,300); Pullman, Washington
*Non-conference game. ^{#}Rankings from AP Poll. (#) Tournament seedings in parentheses. W=West. All times are in Central Time.
