= 1983–84 UAB Blazers men's basketball team =

American college basketball season

1983–84 UAB Blazers men's basketball

Sun Belt tournament champions

NCAA tournament
- Conference: Sun Belt Conference
- Record: 23–11 (8–6 Sun Belt)
- Head coach: Gene Bartow (6th season)
- Home arena: BJCC Coliseum

1983–84 Sun Belt Conference men's basketball standings
	Conf.				Overall
Team	W		L	PCT	W		L	PCT
VCU	11	–	3	.786	23	–	7	.767
Old Dominion	9	–	5	.643	19	–	12	.613
South Florida	9	–	5	.643	17	–	11	.607
South Alabama	9	–	5	.643	22	–	8	.733
UAB †	8	–	6	.571	23	–	11	.676
Western Kentucky	5	–	9	.357	12	–	17	.414
Jacksonville	3	–	11	.214	12	–	16	.429
UNC Charlotte	2	–	12	.143	9	–	19	.321
† 1984 Sun Belt Conference tournament winner Rankings from AP Poll

The 1983–84 UAB Blazers men's basketball team represented the University of Alabama at Birmingham as a member of the Sun Belt Conference during the 1983–84 NCAA Division I men's basketball season. This was head coach Gene Bartow's sixth season at UAB, and the Blazers played their home games at BJCC Coliseum. They finished the season 23–11, 8–6 in Sun Belt play and won the Sun Belt tournament. They received an automatic bid to the NCAA tournament as No. 9 seed in the Mideast region. The Blazers fell to BYU in the opening round, 84–68.

== Roster ==
1983–84 UAB Blazers men's basketball team
Players
Coaches

Pos.	#	Name	Height	Weight	Year	Hometown
G	10	McKinley Singleton	6 ft 5 in (1.96 m)	170 lb (77 kg)	Sr	Memphis, Tennessee
G	11	Murry Bartow	5 ft 10 in (1.78 m)	160 lb (73 kg)	Jr	Birmingham, Alabama
F	12	Marvin Ray Johnson	6 ft 7 in (2.01 m)	—	Jr	Birmingham, Alabama
G	14	Steve Mitchell	6 ft 5 in (1.96 m)	195 lb (88 kg)	So	Memphis, Tennessee
G	15	Luellen Foster	6 ft 4 in (1.93 m)	165 lb (75 kg)	Sr	Birmingham, Alabama
F	40	Jerome Mincy	6 ft 6 in (1.98 m)	215 lb (98 kg)	So	Memphis, Tennessee

Head coach

- Gene Bartow

Assistant coach(es)

Legend

- (C) Team captain
- (S) Suspended
- (I) Ineligible
- (W) Walk-on
- Injured
- Current redshirt

Roster

== Schedule and results ==
Date time, TV	Rank^{#}	Opponent^{#}	Result	Record	Site (attendance) city, state
Regular season
Nov 25, 1983*		Saint Mary's (MN)	W 105–53	1–0	Birmingham-Jefferson Civic Center (6,688); Birmingham, Alabama
Nov 26, 1983*		Charleston Southern	W 73–55	2–0	Birmingham-Jefferson Civic Center (4,538); Birmingham, Alabama
Nov 29, 1983*		Mississippi Valley State	W 87–73	3–0	Birmingham-Jefferson Civic Center (5,101); Birmingham, Alabama
Dec 2, 1983*		Auburn	W 69–62 ^{OT}	4–0	Birmingham-Jefferson Civic Center (16,803); Birmingham, Alabama
Dec 6, 1983		Old Dominion	W 83–73	5–0 (1–0)	Birmingham-Jefferson Civic Center (6,553); Birmingham, Alabama
Dec 10, 1983*		at Chattanooga	L 70–79	5–1	McKenzie Arena (6,323); Chattanooga, Tennessee
Dec 12, 1983*		at Mississippi State	W 55–53	6–1	Humphrey Coliseum (2,245); Starkville, Mississippi
Dec 15, 1983*		U.S. International	W 71–56	7–1	Birmingham-Jefferson Civic Center (2,777); Birmingham, Alabama
Dec 17, 1983*		Baylor	W 73–61	8–1	Birmingham-Jefferson Civic Center (7,873); Birmingham, Alabama
Dec 22, 1983*		Valparaiso	W 64–49	9–1	Birmingham-Jefferson Civic Center (4,232); Birmingham, Alabama
Dec 23, 1983*		Villanova	W 81–76 ^{3OT}	10–1	Birmingham-Jefferson Civic Center (5,885); Birmingham, Alabama
Dec 27, 1983*		vs. Pacific; Rainbow Classic	W 57–48	11–1	Neal S. Blaisdell Center (3,059); Honolulu, Hawaii
Dec 28, 1983*		vs. Southern Methodist; Rainbow Classic	L 63–77 ^{OT}	11–2	Neal S. Blaisdell Center (4,911); Honolulu, Hawaii
Dec 29, 1983*		vs. Tennessee; Rainbow Classic	W 84–66	12–2	Neal S. Blaisdell Center (6,358); Honolulu, Hawaii
Jan 5, 1984*		MacMurray	W 71–43	13–2	Birmingham-Jefferson Civic Center (2,891); Birmingham, Alabama
Jan 7, 1984		Western Kentucky	W 71–56	14–2 (1–0)	Birmingham-Jefferson Civic Center (8,897); Birmingham, Alabama
Jan 14, 1984*		at No. 3 DePaul	L 63–98	14–3	Rosemont Horizon (13,431); Rosemont, Illinois
Jan 19, 1984		VCU	L 61–63	14–4 (1–1)	Birmingham-Jefferson Civic Center (7,887); Birmingham, Alabama
Jan 21, 1984		at South Alabama	W 80–79	15–4 (2–1)	Jaguar Gym (11,106); Mobile, Alabama
Jan 26, 1984		UNC Charlotte	W 74–60	16–4 (3–1)	Birmingham-Jefferson Civic Center (6,886); Birmingham, Alabama
Jan 28, 1984		Jacksonville	W 75–74 ^{OT}	17–4 (4–1)	Birmingham-Jefferson Civic Center (12,056); Birmingham, Alabama
Jan 31, 1984		South Florida	L 46–65	17–5 (4–2)	Birmingham-Jefferson Civic Center (6,881); Birmingham, Alabama
Feb 2, 1984		at Jacksonville	W 68–45	18–5 (5–2)	Jacksonville Coliseum (3,320); Jacksonville, Florida
Feb 4, 1984*		at Memphis State	L 51–53 ^{OT}	18–6	Mid-South Coliseum (11,200); Memphis, Tennessee
Feb 6, 1984		at VCU	L 43–49	18–7 (5–3)	Richmond Coliseum (7,017); Richmond, Virginia
Feb 9, 1984		at UNC Charlotte	W 79–70	19–7 (6–3)	Belk Gymnasium (2,387); Charlotte, North Carolina
Feb 11, 1984		South Alabama	W 51–50	20–7 (7–3)	Birmingham-Jefferson Civic Center (8,489); Birmingham, Alabama
Feb 18, 1984		at Old Dominion	L 55–76	20–8 (7–4)	ODU Fieldhouse (5,584); Norfolk, Virginia
Feb 20, 1984		at South Florida	L 57–58	20–9 (7–5)	USF Sun Dome (3,445); Tampa, Florida
Feb 25, 1984		at Western Kentucky	L 76–89	20–10 (7–6)	Diddle Arena (8,200); Bowling Green, Kentucky
Sun Belt tournament
Mar 2, 1984*	(5)	(4) South Alabama; Quarterfinals	W 76–68	21–10	Birmingham-Jefferson Civic Center (10,621); Birmingham, Alabama
Mar 3, 1984*	(5)	(1) VCU; Semifinals	W 54–52	22–10	Birmingham-Jefferson Civic Center (11,575); Birmingham, Alabama
Mar 4, 1984*	(5)	(2) Old Dominion; Championship Game	W 62–60	23–10	Birmingham-Jefferson Civic Center (9,240); Birmingham, Alabama
NCAA tournament
Mar 15, 1984*	(9 ME)	(8 ME) Brigham Young; First round	L 68–84	23–11	Birmingham-Jefferson Civic Center (7,105); Birmingham, Alabama
*Non-conference game. ^{#}Rankings from AP poll. (#) Tournament seedings in parentheses. ME=Mideast.

== NBA draft ==
Round	Pick	Player	NBA club
6	120	McKinley Singleton	Milwaukee Bucks
