= 1983–84 South Alabama Jaguars basketball team =

American college basketball season

1983–84 South Alabama Jaguars men's basketball

NIT tournament, second round
- Conference: Sun Belt Conference
- East Division
- Record: 22–8 (9–5 Sun Belt)
- Head coach: Cliff Ellis (9th season)
- Assistant coach: Eugene Harris (1st season)
- Home arena: Jaguar Gym; Mobile Municipal Auditorium

1983–84 Sun Belt Conference men's basketball standings
	Conf.				Overall
Team	W		L	PCT	W		L	PCT
VCU	11	–	3	.786	23	–	7	.767
Old Dominion	9	–	5	.643	19	–	12	.613
South Florida	9	–	5	.643	17	–	11	.607
South Alabama	9	–	5	.643	22	–	8	.733
UAB †	8	–	6	.571	23	–	11	.676
Western Kentucky	5	–	9	.357	12	–	17	.414
Jacksonville	3	–	11	.214	12	–	16	.429
UNC Charlotte	2	–	12	.143	9	–	19	.321
† 1984 Sun Belt Conference tournament winner Rankings from AP Poll

The 1983–84 South Alabama Jaguars basketball team represented the University of South Alabama during the 1983–84 NCAA Division I men's basketball season. The Jaguars were led by head coach Cliff Ellis, in his ninth year as head coach. They played their home games at the Mobile Civic Center, and were members of the Sun Belt Conference. South Alabama finished the season 22–8, 9–5 in Sun Belt play to finish in a three-way tie for second place. They were invited to the NIT tournament, where they lost to Virginia Tech in the second round.

== Roster ==
1983–84 South Alabama Jaguars men's basketball team
Players
Coaches

Pos.	#	Name	Height	Weight	Year	Hometown
F		Terry Catledge	6 ft 8 in (2.03 m)	220 lb (100 kg)	Jr	Houston, Mississippi
G		Dexter Shouse	6 ft 2 in (1.88 m)	200 lb (91 kg)	Jr	Terre Haute, Indiana
F		José Waitman	6 ft 8 in (2.03 m)	—	So	Milton, Florida

Head coach

- Cliff Ellis (Florida State)

Assistant coach(es)

- Eugene Harris (Florida State)

Legend

- (C) Team captain
- (S) Suspended
- (I) Ineligible
- (W) Walk-on
- Injured
- Current redshirt

Roster

== Schedule and results ==
Date time, TV	Rank^{#}	Opponent^{#}	Result	Record	Site (attendance) city, state
Regular season
Nov 29, 1983*; 7:30 p.m.		Illinois State	L 70–84	0–1	Jaguar Gym (3,122); Mobile, Alabama
Dec 3, 1983*		Prairie View A&M	W 84–55	1–1	Jaguar Gym (2,812); Mobile, Alabama
Dec 6, 1983*		Mississippi Valley State	W 91–71	2–1	Jaguar Gym (2,940); Mobile, Alabama
Dec 8, 1983*		Florida A&M; Colonial Classic	W 81–70	3–1	Jaguar Gym (4,286); Mobile, Alabama
Dec 9, 1983*		Auburn; Colonial Classic	W 95–73	4–1	Jaguar Gym (6,236); Mobile, Alabama
Dec 12, 1983*		at New Orleans	W 72–68 ^{OT}	5–1	UNO Lakefront Arena (4,150); New Orleans, Louisiana
Dec 17, 1983*		Texas Southern	W 86–72	6–1	Jaguar Gym (2,801); Mobile, Alabama
Dec 19, 1983*		Southern Miss	W 73–71	7–1	Jaguar Gym (3,744); Mobile, Alabama
Dec 21, 1983*		at FIU; Orange Bowl Classic	W 89–48	8–1	(1,351); Miami, Florida
Dec 22, 1983*		vs. Oklahoma State; Orange Bowl Classic	W 78–72	9–1	(1,351); Miami, Florida
Jan 2, 1984*		Roosevelt	W 106–57	10–1	Jaguar Gym (2,310); Mobile, Alabama
Jan 4, 1984		VCU	W 97–73	11–1 (1–0)	Jaguar Gym (7,017); Mobile, Alabama
Jan 10, 1984		South Florida	W 59–58	12–1 (2–0)	Jaguar Gym (5,635); Mobile, Alabama
Jan 14, 1984		at Old Dominion	L 75–88	12–2 (2–1)	ODU Fieldhouse (5,561); Norfolk, Virginia
Jan 16, 1984		at VCU	L 55–84	12–3 (2–2)	Richmond Coliseum (6,630); Richmond, Virginia
Jan 21, 1984		UAB	L 79–80	12–4 (2–3)	Jaguar Gym (11,106); Mobile, Alabama
Jan 26, 1984		Old Dominion	W 87–82	13–4 (3–3)	Jaguar Gym (4,104); Mobile, Alabama
Jan 29, 1984		UNC Charlotte	W 82–77	14–4 (4–3)	Jaguar Gym (6,186); Mobile, Alabama
Jan 31, 1984		Jacksonville	W 91–76	15–4 (5–3)	Jaguar Gym (4,240); Mobile, Alabama
Feb 4, 1984		at Western Kentucky	W 66–65	16–4 (6–3)	Diddle Arena (7,000); Bowling Green, Kentucky
Feb 7, 1984*		New Orleans	W 81–74	17–4	Jaguar Gym (3,679); Mobile, Alabama
Feb 11, 1984		at UAB	L 50–51	17–5 (6–4)	Birmingham-Jefferson Civic Center (8,489); Birmingham, Alabama
Feb 16, 1984		Western Kentucky	W 73–71	18–5 (7–4)	Jaguar Gym (5,191); Mobile, Alabama
Feb 18, 1984		at South Florida	W 67–57	19–5 (8–4)	USF Sun Dome (5,547); Tampa, Florida
Feb 21, 1984		at Jacksonville	L 58–63	19–6 (8–5)	Jacksonville Coliseum (3,921); Jacksonville, Florida
Feb 25, 1984		at UNC Charlotte	W 101–91	20–6 (9–5)	Belk Gymnasium (4,582); Charlotte, North Carolina
Feb 27, 1984*		Bethune–Cookman	W 110–75	21–6	Jaguar Gym (2,817); Mobile, Alabama
Sun Belt Conference tournament
Mar 2, 1981*	(4)	at (5) UAB; Quarterfinals	L 68–76	21–7	Birmingham-Jefferson Civic Center (10,621); Birmingham, Alabama
NIT tournament
Mar 14, 1981*		vs. Florida; First round	W 88–87	22–7	(5,300); Biloxi, Mississippi
Mar 18, 1981*		vs. Virginia Tech; Second round	L 66–68	22–8	Greensboro Coliseum (2,892); Greensboro, North Carolina
*Non-conference game. ^{#}Rankings from AP Poll. (#) Tournament seedings in parentheses. All times are in Central Time.
