= 1983–84 Arkansas Razorbacks men's basketball team =

American college basketball season

1983–84 Arkansas Razorbacks men's basketball

NCAA tournament, Second round
- Conference: Southwest Conference

Ranking
- Coaches: No. 7
- AP: No. 8
- Record: 25–7 (14–2 SWC)
- Head coach: Eddie Sutton (10th season)
- Assistant coaches: Bill Brown (4th season); Doc Sadler (2nd season)
- Home arena: Barnhill Arena

1983–84 Southwest Conference men's basketball standings
	Conf.				Overall
Team	W		L	PCT	W		L	PCT
No. 5 Houston †	15	–	1	.938	32	–	5	.865
No. 8 Arkansas	14	–	2	.875	25	–	7	.781
SMU	12	–	4	.750	25	–	8	.758
Texas Tech	10	–	6	.625	17	–	12	.586
Texas A&M	7	–	9	.438	16	–	14	.533
Rice	6	–	10	.375	13	–	17	.433
TCU	4	–	12	.250	11	–	17	.393
Texas	3	–	13	.188	7	–	21	.250
Baylor	1	–	15	.063	5	–	23	.179
† 1984 SWC tournament winner Rankings from AP poll

The 1983–84 Arkansas Razorbacks men's basketball team represented the University of Arkansas during the 1983–84 NCAA Division I men's basketball season. The head coach was Eddie Sutton, serving for his 10th year. The team played its home games in Barnhill Arena in Fayetteville, Arkansas. This team finished second in the SWC regular season standings, ending Houston's 39-game conference winning streak in the regular season finale. The Cougars avenged that loss to the Hogs in the championship game of the conference tournament. Earlier in the season, Arkansas upset #1 North Carolina to hand the Tar Heels their first loss after opening with 21 consecutive wins. As #2 seed in the East region of the 1984 NCAA Tournament, the Razorbacks were defeated by eventual Final Four participant Virginia in the second round in OT.

== Roster ==
1983–84 Arkansas Razorbacks men's basketball team
Players
Coaches

Pos.	#	Name	Height	Weight	Year	Previous school	Hometown
G	21	Alvin Robertson	6 ft 4 in (1.93 m)	200 lb (91 kg)	Sr	Crowder College	Barberton, Ohio
G	32	Tommy Johnson	6 ft 1 in (1.85 m)	150 lb (68 kg)	Fr	Cy-Fair	Houston, Texas
C	35	Joe Kleine	6 ft 11 in (2.11 m)	250 lb (113 kg)	Jr	Notre Dame	Slater, Missouri

Head coach

- Eddie Sutton

Assistant coach(es)

- Bill Brown
- Doc Sadler

Legend

- (C) Team captain
- (S) Suspended
- (I) Ineligible
- (W) Walk-on
- Injured
- Current redshirt

== Schedule and results ==
Date time, TV	Rank^{#}	Opponent^{#}	Result	Record	Site (attendance) city, state
Regular Season
Nov 25, 1983*	No. 14	vs. Fordham; Great Alaska Shootout	W 62–61	1–0	Sullivan Arena; Anchorage, Alaska
Nov 26, 1983*	No. 14	vs. No. 20 Oklahoma; Great Alaska Shootout	W 84–78	2–0	Sullivan Arena; Anchorage, Alaska
Nov 27, 1983*	No. 14	vs. NC State; Great Alaska Shootout	L 60–65	2–1	Sullivan Arena; Anchorage, Alaska
Dec 1, 1983*	No. 14	Southeast Missouri State	W 79–50	3–1	Barnhill Arena; Fayetteville, Arkansas
Dec 5, 1983*	No. 14	East Tennessee State	W 79–50	4–1	Barnhill Arena; Fayetteville, Arkansas
Dec 8, 1983*	No. 15	at SW Missouri State	W 56–41	5–1	Hammons Student Center; Springfield, Missouri
Dec 10, 1983*	No. 15	at Nebraska	L 54–67	5–2	Bob Devaney Sports Center; Lincoln, Nebraska
Dec 15, 1983*		vs. North Texas	W 93–64	6–2	Pine Bluff Convention Center; Pine Bluff, Arkansas
Dec 21, 1983*		Alabama State	W 86–80	7–2	Barnhill Arena; Fayetteville, Arkansas
Dec 28, 1983*		vs. Saint Peter's	W 82–49	8–2	Barton Coliseum; Little Rock, Arkansas
Dec 30, 1983*		vs. Austin Peay	W 68–63	9–2	Barton Coliseum; Little Rock, Arkansas
Jan 4, 1984		at Baylor	W 57–50	10–2 (1–0)	Heart O' Texas Coliseum; Waco, Texas
Jan 7, 1984		Texas A&M	W 77–54	11–2 (2–0)	Barnhill Arena; Fayetteville, Arkansas
Jan 11, 1984		SMU	W 70–69	12–2 (3–0)	Barnhill Arena; Fayetteville, Arkansas
Jan 14, 1984		at TCU	W 70–62	13–2 (4–0)	Daniel-Meyer Coliseum; Fort Worth, Texas
Jan 17, 1984		at Texas	W 70–66	14–2 (5–0)	Frank Erwin Center; Austin, Texas
Jan 21, 1984		Texas Tech	W 67–57	15–2 (6–0)	Barnhill Arena; Fayetteville, Arkansas
Jan 27, 1984	No. 16	at Rice	L 62–65	15–3 (6–1)	Tudor Fieldhouse; Houston, Texas
Jan 29, 1984*	No. 16	vs. Villanova	L 54–58	15–4	Palestra; Philadelphia, Pennsylvania
Feb 4, 1984		Baylor	W 63–44	16–4 (7–1)	Barnhill Arena; Fayetteville, Arkansas
Feb 9, 1984		at Texas A&M	W 59–58	17–4 (8–1)	G. Rollie White Coliseum; College Station, Texas
Feb 11, 1984		at SMU	W 80–71	18–4 (9–1)	Moody Coliseum; Dallas, Texas
Feb 12, 1984*		vs. No. 1 North Carolina	W 65–64	19–4	Pine Bluff Convention Center; Pine Bluff, Arkansas
Feb 15, 1984	No. 14	TCU	W 55–48	20–4 (10–1)	Barnhill Arena; Fayetteville, Arkansas
Feb 18, 1984	No. 14	Texas	W 59–41	21–4 (11–1)	Barnhill Arena; Fayetteville, Arkansas
Feb 23, 1984	No. 11	at Texas Tech	W 55–49	22–4 (12–1)	Lubbock Municipal Coliseum; Lubbock, Texas
Feb 25, 1984	No. 11	at No. 3 Houston	L 61–64	22–5 (12–2)	Hofheinz Pavilion; Houston, Texas
Feb 29, 1984	No. 12	Rice	W 79–54	23–5 (13–2)	Barnhill Arena; Fayetteville, Arkansas
Mar 4, 1984*	No. 12	No. 2 Houston	W 73–68	24–5 (14–2)	Barnhill Arena; Fayetteville, Arkansas
SWC Tournament
Mar 10, 1984*	No. 8	vs. Texas A&M; Semifinals	W 49–47	25–5	Hofheinz Pavilion; Houston, Texas
Mar 11, 1984*	No. 8	at No. 5 Houston; Championship game	L 56–57	25–6	Hofheinz Pavilion; Houston, Texas
NCAA Tournament
Mar 18, 1984*	(2 E) No. 8	vs. (7 E) Virginia; Second Round	L 51–53 ^{OT}	25–7	Brendan Byrne Arena; East Rutherford, New Jersey
*Non-conference game. ^{#}Rankings from AP Poll. (#) Tournament seedings in parentheses. E=East.

== Rankings ==
Ranking movements Legend: ██ Increase in ranking ██ Decrease in ranking — = Not ranked
	Week																
Poll	Pre	1	2	3	4	5	6	7	8	9	10	11	12	13	14	15	Final
AP	14	14	15	—	—	—	—	—	—	16	—	—	14	11	12	8	8
Coaches	—	—	16	—	—	20	—	19	19	11	18	19	13	11	12	8	7

== Awards and honors ==
- Alvin Robertson – All-American
- Joe Kleine – Honorable Mention AP All-American

== 1984 NBA draft ==
Player	Round	Pick	NBA club
Alvin Robertson	1	7	San Antonio Spurs
