= 1983–84 Kentucky Wildcats men's basketball team =

1983–84 season of University of Kentucky men's basketball team

1983–84 Kentucky Wildcats men's basketball

SEC Tournament champions SEC regular season champions

NCAA men's Division I tournament, Final Four
- Conference: Southeast Conference

Ranking
- Coaches: No. 3
- AP: No. 3
- Record: 29–5 (14–4 SEC)
- Head coach: Joe B. Hall (12th season)
- Assistant coach: Jim Hatfield; Leonard Hamilton; Lake Kelly
- Captain: Dickey Beal
- Home arena: Rupp Arena

1983–84 Southeastern Conference men's basketball standings
	Conf.				Overall
Team	W		L	PCT	W		L	PCT
No. 3 Kentucky †	14	–	4	.778	29	–	5	.853
Auburn	12	–	6	.667	20	–	11	.645
Florida	11	–	7	.611	16	–	13	.552
LSU	11	–	7	.611	18	–	11	.621
Alabama	10	–	8	.556	18	–	12	.600
Tennessee	9	–	9	.500	21	–	14	.600
Vanderbilt	8	–	10	.444	14	–	15	.483
Georgia	8	–	10	.444	17	–	13	.567
Mississippi State	4	–	14	.222	9	–	19	.321
Ole Miss	3	–	15	.167	8	–	20	.286
† 1984 SEC tournament winner Rankings from AP Poll

The 1983–84 Kentucky Wildcats men's basketball team represented University of Kentucky and went to the 1984 Final Four. The head coach was Joe B. Hall. The team was a member of the Southeast Conference and played their home games at Rupp Arena. Because the Wildcats played the regional final on their home court, the following season the NCAA enacted a rule not allowing any school to play in a tournament game on its home court. However, the ruling did not take effect until after the 1986–87 season.

In the 1984 NCAA Tournament the Kentucky Wildcats were invited to participate as a #1 seed. After wins vs BYU, Louisville and Illinois The Wildcats advanced to their 9th Final Four. In the semifinal match up Kentucky would fall to the eventual National Champion Georgetown Hoyas 53–40.

== Roster ==
1983–84 Kentucky Wildcats men's basketball team
Players
Coaches

Pos.	#	Name	Height	Weight	Year	Hometown
G	10	James Blackmon	6 ft 3 in (1.91 m)	180 lb (82 kg)	Fr	Marion, Indiana
G	11	Dicky Beal	5 ft 11 in (1.8 m)	170 lb (77 kg)	Sr	Covington, Kentucky
G	12	Leroy Byrd	5 ft 5 in (1.65 m)	145 lb (66 kg)	So	Lexington, Kentucky
G	14	Paul Andrews	6 ft 3 in (1.91 m)	180 lb (82 kg)	Fr	London, Kentucky
G	20	Jim Master	6 ft 5 in (1.96 m)	180 lb (82 kg)	Sr	Fort Wayne, Indiana
G	23	Roger Harden	6 ft 1 in (1.85 m)	165 lb (75 kg)	So	Valparaiso, Indiana
F	24	Bret Bearup	6 ft 9 in (2.06 m)	230 lb (104 kg)	Jr	Centerport, New York
F	25	Winston Bennett	6 ft 7 in (2.01 m)	210 lb (95 kg)	Fr	Louisville, Kentucky
F/C	31	Sam Bowie	7 ft 1 in (2.16 m)	235 lb (107 kg)	Sr	Lebanon, Pennsylvania
F/C	33	Tom Heitz	6 ft 9 in (2.06 m)	220 lb (100 kg)	Sr	Hamilton, Indiana
F	34	Kenny Walker	6 ft 8 in (2.03 m)	190 lb (86 kg)	So	Roberta, Georgia
F	40	Troy McKinley	6 ft 6 in (1.98 m)	195 lb (88 kg)	Jr	Independence, Kentucky
C	54	Melvin Turpin	6 ft 11 in (2.11 m)	240 lb (109 kg)	Sr	Lexington, Kentucky

Head coach

- Joe B. Hall (Kentucky)

Assistant coach(es)

- Leonard Hamilton (UT Martin)
- Lake Kelly (Georgia Tech)
- Jim Hatfield (East Tennessee State)

Legend

- (C) Team captain
- (S) Suspended
- (I) Ineligible
- (W) Walk-on
- Injured
- Current redshirt

== Schedule ==
Date time, TV	Rank^{#}	Opponent^{#}	Result	Record	Site city, state
Regular Season
November 26*; WTBS	No. 2	No. 6 Louisville; Rivalry	W 65–44	1–0	Rupp Arena; Lexington, KY
December 3* CBS	No. 1	Indiana; Rivalry	W 59–54	2–0	Rupp Arena; Lexington, KY
December 10*	No. 2	at Kansas	W 72–50	3–0	Allen Fieldhouse; Lawrence, KS
December 16*	No. 2	Wyoming; UK Invitation Tournament	W 66–40	4–0	Rupp Arena; Lexington, KY
December 17*	No. 2	BYU; UK Invitation Tournament	W 93–59	5–0	Rupp Arena; Lexington, KY
December 20*; SPI	No. 2	at Cincinnati	W 24–11	6–0	Riverfront Coliseum; Cincinnati, OH
December 24*	No. 2	at Illinois	W 56–54	7–0	Assembly Hall (10,732); Champaign, IL
December 28*	No. 2	vs. No. 18 Purdue	W 86–67	8–0	Freedom Hall; Louisville, KY
January 2	No. 2	at Ole Miss	W 68–55	9–0 (1–0)	Tad Smith Coliseum; Oxford, MS
January 7	No. 2	at No. 9 LSU	W 96–80	10–0 (2–0)	LSU Assembly Center; Baton Rouge, LA
January 9	No. 2	Alabama	W 76–66	11–0 (3–0)	Rupp Arena; Lexington, KY
January 11	No. 2	Mississippi State	W 51–42	12–0 (4–0)	Rupp Arena; Lexington, KY
January 13; WTBS	No. 2	at Auburn	L 63–82	12–1 (4–1)	Beard-Eaves Memorial Coliseum; Auburn, AL
January 17	No. 3	at Florida	L 57–69	12–2 (4–2)	Stephen C. O'Connell Center; Gainesville, FL
January 20	No. 3	Vanderbilt	W 67–46	13–2 (5–2)	Rupp Arena; Lexington, KY
January 22*; CBS	No. 3	No. 4 Houston	W 74–67	14–2	Rupp Arena; Lexington, KY
January 28	No. 3	No. 18 Georgia	W 64–40	15–2 (6–2)	Rupp Arena; Lexington, KY
January 30	No. 3	Tennessee; Rivalry	W 93–74	16–2 (7–2)	Rupp Arena; Lexington, KY
February 4	No. 3	at Alabama	L 62–69	16–3 (7–3)	Coleman Coliseum; Tuscaloosa, AL
February 6	No. 3	at Mississippi State	W 77–58	17–3 (8–3)	Humphrey Coliseum; Starkville, MS
February 11	No. 6	No. 16 Auburn	W 84–64	18–3 (9–3)	Rupp Arena; Lexington, KY
February 13	No. 6	Florida	W 67–65	19–3 (10–3)	Rupp Arena; Lexington, KY
February 19; SPI	No. 6	at Vanderbilt	W 58–54	20–3 (11–3)	Memorial Gymnasium; Nashville, TN
February 25; NBC	No. 4	at Georgia	W 66–64	21–3 (12–3)	Georgia Coliseum; Athens, GA
February 27	No. 4	at Tennessee; Rivalry	L 58–63	21–4 (12–4)	Stokely Athletics Center; Knoxville, TN
March 1	No. 3	Ole Miss	W 76–57	22–4 (13–4)	Rupp Arena; Lexington, KY
March 3	No. 3	LSU	W 90–68	23–4 (14–4)	Rupp Arena; Lexington, KY
SEC Tournament
March 8*	(1) No. 3	vs. (8) Georgia; Second Round	W 92–79	24–4	Memorial Gymnasium; Nashville, TN
March 9*	(1) No. 3	vs. (5) Alabama; Semifinals	W 48–46	25–4	Memorial Gymnasium; Nashville, TN
March 10*	(1) No. 3	vs. (2) Auburn; Championship Game	W 51–49	26–4	Memorial Gymnasium; Nashville, TN
NCAA Tournament
March 17*	(1 ME) No. 3	vs. (8 ME) BYU; Second Round	W 93–68	27–4	Birmingham-Jefferson Civic Center; Birmingham, AL
March 22*; NCAAP	(1 ME) No. 3	vs. (5 ME) Louisville; Sweet Sixteen	W 72–67	28–4	Rupp Arena; Lexington, KY
March 24*; CBS	(1 ME) No. 3	vs. (2 ME) No. 6 Illinois; Elite Eight	W 54–51	29–4	Rupp Arena (23,525); Lexington, KY
March 31*; 6:12 p.m., CBS	(1 ME) No. 3	vs. (1 W) No. 2 Georgetown; Final Four	L 40–53	29–5	Kingdome (38,471); Seattle, WA
*Non-conference game. ^{#}Rankings from AP Poll. (#) Tournament seedings in parentheses. ME=Mideast. All times are in Eastern Time.

== Statistics ==
- C Melvin Turpin (6–11, Sr) 15.2 ppg
- F Kenny Walker (6–8, So) 12.4 ppg
- F Sam Bowie (7–1, Sr) 10.5 ppg
- G Jim Master (6–5, Sr) 9.6 ppg
- F Winston Bennett (6–7, Fr) 6.5 ppg

== Team players drafted into the NBA ==
Year	Round	Pick	Player	NBA club
1984	1	2	Sam Bowie	Portland Trail Blazers
1984	1	6	Melvin Turpin	Washington Bullets
1984	4	81	Dicky Beal	Atlanta Hawks
1984	6	127	Jim Master	Atlanta Hawks
1984	8	163	Tom Heitz	Indiana Pacers
1986	1	5	Kenny Walker	New York Knicks
1986	5	115	Roger Harden	Los Angeles Lakers
1987	5	94	James Blackmon	New Jersey Nets
1988	3	64	Winston Bennett	Cleveland Cavaliers
