= 1983–84 Auburn Tigers men's basketball team =

American college basketball season

1983–84 Auburn Tigers men's basketball

NCAA tournament, First Round
- Conference: Southeastern Conference

Ranking
- Coaches: No. 19
- Record: 20–11 (12–6 SEC)
- Head coach: Sonny Smith (6th season)
- Home arena: Memorial Coliseum

1983–84 Southeastern Conference men's basketball standings
	Conf.				Overall
Team	W		L	PCT	W		L	PCT
No. 3 Kentucky †	14	–	4	.778	29	–	5	.853
Auburn	12	–	6	.667	20	–	11	.645
Florida	11	–	7	.611	16	–	13	.552
LSU	11	–	7	.611	18	–	11	.621
Alabama	10	–	8	.556	18	–	12	.600
Tennessee	9	–	9	.500	21	–	14	.600
Vanderbilt	8	–	10	.444	14	–	15	.483
Georgia	8	–	10	.444	17	–	13	.567
Mississippi State	4	–	14	.222	9	–	19	.321
Ole Miss	3	–	15	.167	8	–	20	.286
† 1984 SEC tournament winner Rankings from AP Poll

The 1983–84 Auburn Tigers men's basketball team represented Auburn University in the 1983–84 college basketball season. The team's head coach was Sonny Smith, who was in his sixth season at Auburn. The team played their home games at Memorial Coliseum in Auburn, Alabama. They finished the season 20–11, 12–6 in SEC play. They defeated Vanderbilt and Tennessee to advance to the championship game of the SEC tournament where they lost to Kentucky. They received an at-large bid to the NCAA tournament where they lost to Richmond in the first round.

Notable freshman signees were guards Gerald White and Frank Ford, along with junior college transfers Vern Strickland and Carey Holland for frontcourt help. Junior Charles Barkley suffered a back injury in the first game of the season and missed time, but returned for a January 13 home date with then #1-ranked Kentucky. Auburn upset the Wildcats 82-63, their first victory ever over a #1-ranked team.

After the first-round NCAA loss to Richmond, Barkley left Auburn and entered the NBA draft.

== Roster ==
1983–84 Auburn Tigers men's basketball team
Players
Coaches

Pos.	#	Name	Height	Weight	Year	Previous school	Hometown
F/C	34	Charles Barkley	6 ft 6 in (1.98 m)	—	Jr	Leeds High School	Birmingham, AL
F	45	Chuck Person	6 ft 8 in (2.03 m)	—	So	Brantley High School	Brantley, AL
F	11	Greg Turner	6 ft 7 in (2.01 m)	—	Sr	Tuskegee High School	Tuskegee, Alabama
G	12	Gerald White	6 ft 1 in (1.85 m)	—	Fr	Richmond Academy	Augusta, Georgia
G	15	Frank Ford	6 ft 4 in (1.93 m)	—	Fr	Osceola High School	Kissimmee, Florida
F	31	Vern Strickland	6 ft 5 in (1.96 m)	—	Jr	Emma Sansom High School	Gadsden, Alabama
F	00	Paul Daniels	6 ft 0 in (1.83 m)	—	Sr	Warner Christian	Ormond Beach, Florida
C	33	Carey Holland	6 ft 7 in (2.01 m)	—	So	Baldwin High School	Baldwin, Florida
F	21	Mark Cahill	6 ft 7 in (2.01 m)	—	So	Stone Mountain High School	Stone Mountain, Georgia
F	25	Terry Martin	6 ft 6 in (1.98 m)	—	So	Douglass High School	Atlanta, Georgia

Head coach

- Sonny Smith (Milligan)

Assistant coach(es)

Legend

- (C) Team captain
- (S) Suspended
- (I) Ineligible
- (W) Walk-on
- Injured
- Current redshirt

== Schedule and results ==
Date time, TV	Rank^{#}	Opponent^{#}	Result	Record	Site (attendance) city, state
Regular season
Nov 28, 1983*		Columbus College	W 58–54	1–0	Beard–Eaves–Memorial Coliseum; Auburn, Alabama
Dec 2, 1983*; ESPN		at Alabama-Birmingham	L 62–69 ^{OT}	1–1	Birmingham-Jefferson Civic Center (16,803); Birmingham, Alabama
Dec 5, 1983*		at Florida State	W 76–69	2–1	Donald L. Tucker Center; Tallahassee, Florida
Dec 8, 1983*		vs. Youngstown State; Colonial Classic	W 78–52	3–1	Jaguar Gym; Mobile, Alabama
Dec 9, 1983*		at South Alabama; Colonial Classic	L 73–95	3–2	Jaguar Gym (6,236); Mobile, Alabama
Dec 14, 1983*		at Mercer	W 65–63	4–2	Porter Gymnasium; Macon, Georgia
Dec 19, 1983*		Eastern Kentucky	W 100–60	5–2	Beard–Eaves–Memorial Coliseum; Auburn, Alabama
Dec 22, 1983		at Mississippi State	W 73–55	6–2 (1–0)	Humphrey Coliseum; Starkville, Mississippi
Dec 27, 1983*; ESPN		vs. No. 10 Wake Forest; Gator Bowl Tournament	L 67–76	6–3	Jacksonville Memorial Coliseum; Jacksonville, Florida
Dec 28, 1983*		vs. Villanova; Gator Bowl Tournament	W 95–83	7–3	Jacksonville Memorial Coliseum; Jacksonville, Florida
Jan 5, 1984		at Alabama	W 91–86	8–3 (2–0)	Coleman Coliseum; Tuscaloosa, Alabama
Jan 7, 1984; SPI		Florida	W 82–66	9–3 (3–0)	Beard–Eaves–Memorial Coliseum; Auburn, Alabama
Jan 13, 1984; WTBS		No. 2 Kentucky	W 82–63	10–3 (4–0)	Beard–Eaves–Memorial Coliseum; Auburn, Alabama
Jan 17, 1984		Vanderbilt	L 71–73	10–4 (4–1)	Beard–Eaves–Memorial Coliseum; Auburn, Alabama
Jan 22, 1984; SPI		at Georgia	L 86–90	10–5 (4–2)	Stegeman Coliseum; Athens, Georgia
Jan 24, 1984		at Tennessee	W 79–72	11–5 (5–2)	Stokely Athletic Center; Knoxville, Tennessee
Jan 27, 1984; WTBS		No. 10 LSU	W 80–78	12–5 (6–2)	Beard–Eaves–Memorial Coliseum; Auburn, Alabama
Jan 31, 1984*; USA	No. 19	Ole Miss	W 60–50	13–5 (7–2)	Beard–Eaves–Memorial Coliseum; Auburn, Alabama
Feb 5, 1984; SPI	No. 19	at Florida	W 67–65	14–5 (8–2)	Stephen C. O'Connell Center; Gainesville, Florida
Feb 11, 1984; SPI	No. 16	at No. 6 Kentucky	L 64–84	14–6 (8–3)	Rupp Arena; Lexington, Kentucky
Feb 13, 1984; ESPN		at Vanderbilt	W 73–67	15–6 (9–3)	Memorial Gymnasium; Nashville, Tennessee
Feb 18, 1984		Georgia	W 81–63	16–6 (10–3)	Beard–Eaves–Memorial Coliseum; Auburn, Alabama
Feb 20, 1984		Tennessee	L 54–57	16–7 (10–4)	Beard–Eaves–Memorial Coliseum; Auburn, Alabama
Feb 25, 1984; CBS	No. 19	at LSU	L 80–81	16–8 (10–5)	LSU Assembly Center; Baton Rouge, Louisiana
Feb 27, 1984		at Ole Miss	L 71–72	16–9 (10–6)	Tad Smith Coliseum; Oxford, Mississippi
Mar 1, 1984; WTBS		Mississippi State	W 68–53	17–9 (11–6)	Beard–Eaves–Memorial Coliseum; Auburn, Alabama
Mar 3, 1984; SPI		Alabama	W 83–70	18–9 (12–6)	Beard–Eaves–Memorial Coliseum; Auburn, Alabama
SEC Tournament
Mar 8, 1984*; SPI		at Vanderbilt; Quarterfinal	W 59–58	19–9	Memorial Gymnasium; Nashville, Tennessee
Mar 9, 1984*; SPI		vs. Tennessee; Semifinal	W 60–58	20–9	Memorial Gymnasium; Nashville, Tennessee
Mar 10, 1984*; SPI		vs. No. 3 Kentucky; Championship Game	L 49–51	20–10	Memorial Gymnasium; Nashville, Tennessee
NCAA Tournament
Mar 15, 1984*	(5)	vs. (12) Richmond; NCAA tournament	L 71–72	20–11	Charlotte Coliseum; Charlotte, North Carolina
*Non-conference game. ^{#}Rankings from AP Poll. (#) Tournament seedings in parentheses.

== Team players in the NBA draft ==
Year	Round	Pick	Player	NBA club
1984	1	5	Charles Barkley	Philadelphia 76ers
1986	1	4	Chuck Person	Indiana Pacers
