= 1984 Sun Belt Conference men's basketball tournament =

- Classification: Division I
- Season: 1983–84
- Teams: 8
- Site: Birmingham–Jefferson Civic Center; Birmingham, AL
- Champions: UAB (3rd title)
- Winning coach: Gene Bartow (3rd title)
- MVP: McKinley Singleton (UAB)

1983–84 Sun Belt Conference men's basketball standings
	Conf.				Overall
Team	W		L	PCT	W		L	PCT
VCU	11	–	3	.786	23	–	7	.767
Old Dominion	9	–	5	.643	19	–	12	.613
South Florida	9	–	5	.643	17	–	11	.607
South Alabama	9	–	5	.643	22	–	8	.733
UAB †	8	–	6	.571	23	–	11	.676
Western Kentucky	5	–	9	.357	12	–	17	.414
Jacksonville	3	–	11	.214	12	–	16	.429
UNC Charlotte	2	–	12	.143	9	–	19	.321
† 1984 Sun Belt Conference tournament winner Rankings from AP Poll

The 1984 Sun Belt Conference men's basketball tournament was held March 2–4 at the Birmingham–Jefferson Civic Center in Birmingham, Alabama.

Hosts UAB upset Old Dominion in the championship game, 62–60, to win their third overall, as well as third consecutive, Sun Belt men's basketball tournament.

The Blazers, in turn, received an automatic bid for the 1984 NCAA tournament. They were joined in the tournament by fellow Sun Belt member VCU, who received an at-large bid.

== Format ==
There were no changes made to the tournament format from the previous year. All eight conference members were placed into the initial quarterfinal round, with each team being seeded based on its regular season conference record.

== Bracket ==
Quarterfinals; Friday, March 2
1	VCU	64
8	UNC Charlotte	52
5	UAB	76
4	South Alabama	68
3	South Florida	53
6	Western Kentucky	57
7	Jacksonville	68
2	Old Dominion	79

Semifinals; Saturday, March 3
1	VCU	52
5	UAB	54
6	Western Kentucky	72
2	Old Dominion	78

Championship; Sunday, March 4
5	UAB	62
2	Old Dominion	60

== See also ==
- Sun Belt Conference women's basketball tournament
