= 1983–84 Alabama Crimson Tide men's basketball team =

American college basketball season

1983–84 Alabama Crimson Tide men's basketball

NCAA tournament, First Round
- Conference: Southeastern Conference
- Record: 18–12 (10–8 SEC)
- Head coach: Wimp Sanderson (4th season)
- Home arena: Coleman Coliseum

1983–84 Southeastern Conference men's basketball standings
	Conf.				Overall
Team	W		L	PCT	W		L	PCT
No. 3 Kentucky †	14	–	4	.778	29	–	5	.853
Auburn	12	–	6	.667	20	–	11	.645
Florida	11	–	7	.611	16	–	13	.552
LSU	11	–	7	.611	18	–	11	.621
Alabama	10	–	8	.556	18	–	12	.600
Tennessee	9	–	9	.500	21	–	14	.600
Vanderbilt	8	–	10	.444	14	–	15	.483
Georgia	8	–	10	.444	17	–	13	.567
Mississippi State	4	–	14	.222	9	–	19	.321
Ole Miss	3	–	15	.167	8	–	20	.286
† 1984 SEC tournament winner Rankings from AP Poll

The 1983–84 Alabama Crimson Tide men's basketball team represented the University of Alabama in the 1983–84 NCAA Division I men's basketball season. The team's head coach was Wimp Sanderson, who was in his fourth season at Alabama. The team played their home games at Coleman Coliseum in Tuscaloosa, Alabama. They finished the season 18–12, 10–8 in SEC play, finishing in fifth place.

The Tide had to deal with the loss of backcourt mates Ennis Whatley, who declared for the NBA draft after his sophomore season, and Mike Davis, who graduated. To offset the loss, the Tide signed freshmen Terry Coner and Craig Dudley.

The Tide lost to Kentucky in the SEC tournament semifinals. They received an at-large bid to the 1984 NCAA Division I men's basketball tournament, and lost in the first round to Illinois State.

== Roster ==
1983–84 Alabama Crimson Tide men's basketball team
Players
Coaches

Pos.	#	Name	Height	Weight	Year	Previous school	Hometown
F/C	34	Bobby Lee Hurt	6 ft 9 in (2.06 m)	—	Jr	S. R. Butler High School	Huntsville, Alabama
F	24	Buck Johnson	6 ft 7 in (2.01 m)	—	So	Hayes High School	Birmingham, Alabama
G	11	Eric Richardson	6 ft 3 in (1.91 m)	—	Sr
G	30	Terry Coner	6 ft 3 in (1.91 m)	—	Fr	Phillips High School	Birmingham, Alabama
G	24	Craig Dudley	6 ft 4 in (1.93 m)	—	Fr
F	41	Terry Williams	6 ft 8 in (2.03 m)	—	Sr	Elkmont High School	Elkmont, Alabama
F		Darrell Neal	6 ft 8 in (2.03 m)	—
G	23	Rex Jones	6 ft 4 in (1.93 m)	—	Jr
C	51	Mark Farmer	6 ft 11 in (2.11 m)	—	Jr
F	21	Jim Farmer	6 ft 4 in (1.93 m)	—	Fr	Houston Academy	Dothan, Alabama

Head coach

- Wimp Sanderson

Assistant coach(es)

Legend

- (C) Team captain
- (S) Suspended
- (I) Ineligible
- (W) Walk-on
- Injured
- Current redshirt

== Schedule and results ==
Date time, TV	Rank^{#}	Opponent^{#}	Result	Record	Site city, state
Regular Season
November 26, 1983*		Rider	W 70–50	1–0	Memorial Coliseum; Tuscaloosa, Alabama
November 28, 1983*		Cincinnati	W 83–64	2–0	Memorial Coliseum; Tuscaloosa, Alabama
December 1, 1983*		McNeese State	W 93–77	3–0	Memorial Coliseum; Tuscaloosa, Alabama
December 7, 1983*		East Tennessee State	W 87–64	4–0	Memorial Coliseum; Tuscaloosa, Alabama
December 15, 1983*		No. 4 DePaul; Suntory Ball	L 76–77	4–1	Osaka, Japan
December 17, 1983*		Texas Tech; Suntory Ball	W 76–56	5–1	Osaka, Japan
December 28, 1983*		Michigan State	W 81–69	6–1	The Omni; Atlanta, Georgia
December 29, 1983*		Georgia Tech	L 54–57	6–2	The Omni; Atlanta, Georgia
January 2, 1984		Florida	W 63–61	7–2 (1–0)	Memorial Coliseum; Tuscaloosa, Alabama
January 5, 1984		Auburn	L 86–91	7–3 (1–1)	Memorial Coliseum; Tuscaloosa, Alabama
January 9, 1984		at No. 2 Kentucky	L 66–76	7–4 (1–2)	Rupp Arena; Lexington, Kentucky
January 11, 1984		at Vanderbilt	L 67–69	7–5 (1–3)	Memorial Gymnasium; Nashville, Tennessee
January 16, 1984		Tennessee	W 82–72	8–5 (2–3)	Memorial Coliseum; Tuscaloosa, Alabama
January 19, 1984		Georgia	W 65–60	9–5 (3–3)	Memorial Coliseum; Tuscaloosa, Alabama
January 21, 1984		at No. 15 LSU	L 84–85	9–6 (3–4)	Maravich Assembly Center; Baton Rouge, Louisiana
January 23, 1984		at Ole Miss	W 69–56	10–6 (4–4)	Tad Smith Coliseum; Oxford, Mississippi
January 28, 1984		Mississippi State	W 74–57	11–6 (5–4)	Memorial Coliseum; Tuscaloosa, Alabama
February 4, 1984		No. 3 Kentucky	W 69–62	12–6 (6–4)	Memorial Coliseum; Tuscaloosa, Alabama
February 6, 1984		Vanderbilt	W 80–73	13–6 (7–4)	Memorial Coliseum; Tuscaloosa, Alabama
February 10, 1984		at Georgia	L 69–82	13–7 (7–5)	Stegeman Coliseum; Athens, Georgia
February 13, 1984		at Tennessee	W 72–66	14–7 (8–5)	Stokely Center; Knoxville, Tennessee
February 17, 1984		No. 17 LSU	W 51–49	15–7 (9–5)	Memorial Coliseum; Tuscaloosa, Alabama
February 20, 1984		Ole Miss	W 74–65	16–7 (10–5)	Memorial Coliseum; Tuscaloosa, Alabama
February 26, 1984		at Mississippi State	L 70–74	16–8 (10–6)	Humphrey Coliseum; Starkville, Mississippi
March 1, 1984		Florida	L 62–81	16–9 (10–7)	O'Connell Center; Gainesville, Florida
March 3, 1984		at Auburn	L 70–83	16–10 (10–8)	Memorial Coliseum; Auburn, Alabama
SEC Tournament
March 8, 1984	(5)	(4) LSU; Second Round	W 72–70 ^{OT}	17–10	Memorial Gymnasium; Nashville, Tennessee
March 9, 1984	(5)	(1) No. 3 Kentucky	L 46–48	17–11	Memorial Gymnasium; Nashville, Tennessee
NCAA Tournament
March 16, 1984*	(9 MW)	(8 MW) Illinois State; First round	L 48–49	17–12	Bob Devaney Sports Center; Lincoln, Nebraska
*Non-conference game. ^{#}Rankings from AP poll. (#) Tournament seedings in parentheses. SE=Southeast.
