= Hakeem Olajuwon =

Nigerian-American basketball player (born 1963)

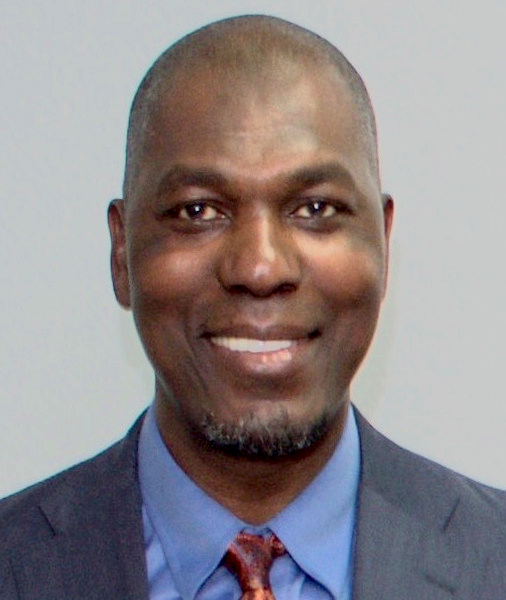
- Olajuwon in 2015

Personal information
- Born: January 21, 1963 (age 63) Lagos, Nigeria
- Listed height: 7 ft 0 in (2.13 m)
- Listed weight: 255 lb (116 kg)

Career information
- High school: Muslim Teachers College (Lagos, Nigeria)
- College: Houston (1981–1984)
- NBA draft: 1984: 1st round, 1st overall pick
- Drafted by: Houston Rockets
- Playing career: 1984–2002
- Position: Center
- Number: 34

Career history
- 1984–2001: Houston Rockets
- 2001–2002: Toronto Raptors

Career highlights
- 2× NBA champion (1994, 1995); 2× NBA Finals MVP (1994, 1995); NBA Most Valuable Player (1994); 12× NBA All-Star (1985–1990, 1992–1997); 6× All-NBA First Team (1987–1989, 1993, 1994, 1997); 3× All-NBA Second Team (1986, 1990, 1996); 3× All-NBA Third Team (1991, 1995, 1999); 2× NBA Defensive Player of the Year (1993, 1994); 5× NBA All-Defensive First Team (1987, 1988, 1990, 1993, 1994); 4× NBA All-Defensive Second Team (1985, 1991, 1996, 1997); NBA All-Rookie First Team (1985); 2× NBA rebounding leader (1989, 1990); 3× NBA blocks leader (1990, 1991, 1993); No. 34 retired by Houston Rockets; NBA anniversary team (50th, 75th); NCAA Final Four Most Outstanding Player (1983); Helms Foundation Player of the Year (1983); Consensus first-team All-American (1984); NCAA rebounding leader (1984); SWC Player of the Year (1984); First-team All-SWC (1984); Second-team All-SWC (1983); No. 34 retired by Houston Cougars

Career NBA statistics
- Points: 26,946 (21.8 ppg)
- Rebounds: 13,747 (11.1 rpg)
- Blocks: 3,830 (3.1 bpg)
- Stats at NBA.com
- Stats at Basketball Reference
- Basketball Hall of Fame
- FIBA Hall of Fame
Medals
Men's basketball
Representing the United States
Olympic Games
Gold medal – first place	1996 Atlanta	Team competition

Hakeem Abdul Olajuwon (Note: English: /həˈkiːm əˈlaɪʒu.ɒn/ hə-KEEM ə-LY-zhoo-on, Yoruba: [ɔ̄lád͡ʒùwɔ̃̀].) (Note: Known until 1991 as Akeem Olajuwon) (born January 21, 1963), nicknamed "the Dream", is a Nigerian and American former professional basketball player who played 18 seasons in the National Basketball Association (NBA), primarily with the Houston Rockets. He is a two-time NBA champion, two-time NBA Finals MVP, two-time NBA Defensive Player of the Year, and the 1994 NBA MVP. He is widely regarded as one of the greatest players and centers of all time.

Born in Lagos, Nigeria, Olajuwon traveled from his home country to play for the University of Houston under head coach Guy Lewis. His college career for the Cougars included three trips to the Final Four. Olajuwon was drafted by the Houston Rockets with the first overall selection of the 1984 NBA draft, a draft well known for its immense talent, which also included players such as Michael Jordan, Charles Barkley, and John Stockton. He combined with the 7-foot-4-inch (224 cm) Ralph Sampson to form a duo dubbed the "Twin Towers". The two led the Rockets to the 1986 NBA Finals, where they lost in six games to the Boston Celtics. After Sampson was traded to the Golden State Warriors in 1988, Olajuwon became the Rockets' undisputed leader. He led the league in rebounding twice (1989, 1990) and blocks three times (1990, 1991, 1993).

Despite very nearly being traded during a bitter contract dispute before the 1992–93 season, he remained in Houston. He became the first non-American to be an NBA All-Star and start in an NBA All-Star Game, the first non-American to win the NBA MVP, the first non-American to win NBA Defensive Player of the Year, and in the 1993–94 season, he became and remains the only player in NBA history to win the NBA MVP, Defensive Player of the Year, and Finals MVP awards in the same season. His Rockets won back-to-back championships. The Rockets' 1994 championship against the New York Knicks was the first in franchise history, with Olajuwon avenging his college championship loss to Patrick Ewing. The following year, after a lackluster regular season, Olajuwon's Rockets swept Shaquille O'Neal's Orlando Magic in 4 games in the NBA Finals.

Olajuwon was a member of the 1996 Olympic gold medal-winning United States national basketball team, and was selected as one of the 50 Greatest Players in NBA History. He was inducted into the Naismith Memorial Basketball Hall of Fame in 2008 and the FIBA Hall of Fame in 2016. In October 2021, Olajuwon was honored as one of the league's greatest players of all time by being named to the NBA 75th Anniversary Team. He ended his career as the league's all-time leader in blocks (3,830), is one of four NBA players to record a quadruple-double, and is the all-time leader in 5x5 games (when a player has at least 5 points, 5 rebounds, 5 assists, 5 steals and 5 blocks) with six.

== Early life ==
Olajuwon was born to Salim and Abike Olajuwon, working-class Yoruba owners of a cement business in Lagos, Nigeria. He was the third of eight children. He credits his parents with instilling virtues of hard work and discipline into him and his siblings: "They taught us to be honest, work hard, respect our elders, and believe in ourselves." Olajuwon has expressed displeasure at his childhood in Nigeria being characterized as backward. "Lagos is a very cosmopolitan city ... There are many ethnic groups. I grew up in an environment at schools where there were all different types of people."

During his youth, Olajuwon was a soccer goalkeeper which helped give him the footwork and agility to balance his size and strength in basketball, and also contributed to his shot-blocking ability. Olajuwon did not play basketball until the age of 15 in high school, when he entered a local tournament while at the Muslim Teachers College in Lagos, Nigeria. It has been said that a coach in Nigeria once asked him to dunk and demonstrated while standing on a chair. Olajuwon then tried to stand on the chair himself. When redirected by staff not to use the chair, he could initially not dunk the basketball.

Despite early struggles, Olajuwon said, "Basketball is something that is so unique. That immediately I pick up the game and, you know, realize that this is the life for me. All the other sports just become obsolete."

== College career ==
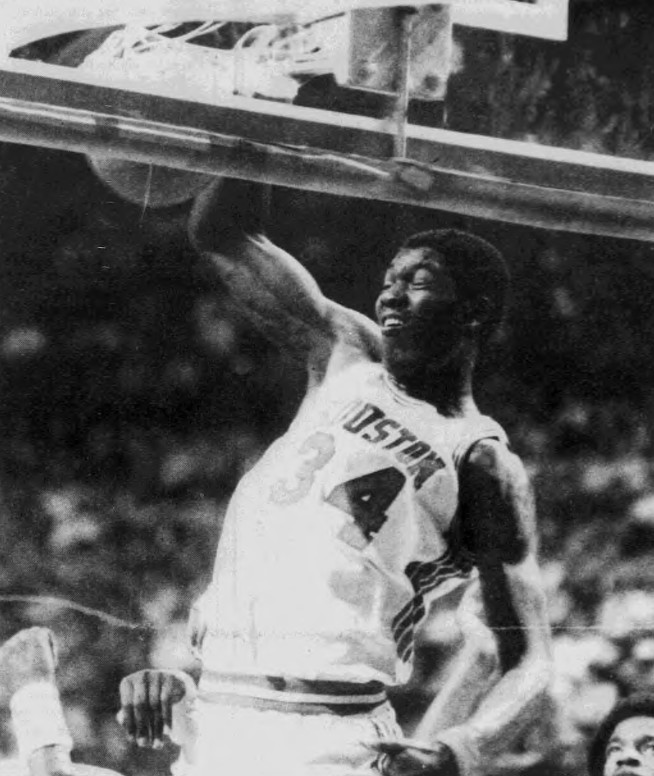
Olajuwon playing for the Houston Cougars in 1984

Olajuwon emigrated from Nigeria to play basketball at the University of Houston under Cougars coach Guy Lewis. Olajuwon was not highly recruited and was merely offered a visit to the university to work out for the coaching staff, based on a recommendation from a friend of Lewis who had seen Olajuwon play. He later recalled that when he originally arrived at the airport in 1980 for the visit, no representative of the school was there to greet him. When he called the staff, they told him to take a taxi out to the university.

After redshirting his freshman year in 1980–81 because he could not yet get clearance from the NCAA to play, Olajuwon came mostly off the bench and served as the Cougars' sixth man as a redshirt freshman in 1981–82, averaging 8.3 points, 6.2 rebounds and 2.5 blocks, shooting 60% from the field in 18 minutes per game as Houston was eliminated in the Final Four by the eventual NCAA champion, North Carolina. Olajuwon sought advice from the coaching staff about how to increase his playing time, and they advised him to work out with local Houston resident and multiple NBA MVP winner, Moses Malone. Malone, who was then a center on the NBA's Houston Rockets, played games every off-season with several NBA players at the Fonde Recreation Center. Olajuwon joined the workouts and went head to head with Malone in several games throughout the summer. Olajuwon credited this experience with rapidly improving his game: "The way Moses helped me is by being out there playing and allowing me to go against that level of competition. He was the best center in the NBA at the time, so I was trying to improve my game against the best."

Olajuwon returned from that summer a different player. He was nicknamed "the Dream" during his basketball career after he dunked so effortlessly that his college coach said it "looked like a dream." He and his teammates (including Clyde Drexler) formed what was dubbed "Phi Slama Jama", the first slam-dunking "fraternity", so named because of its above-the-rim prowess. In his sophomore and junior years he helped the Cougars advance to consecutive NCAA championship games, where they lost to North Carolina State on a last-second tip-in in 1983 and a Patrick Ewing-led Georgetown team in 1984. He averaged 13.9 points, 11.4 rebounds, and 5.1 blocks in 1982–83 and 16.8 points, 13.5 rebounds, and 5.6 blocks in 1983–84. Olajuwon was voted the NCAA Tournament Most Outstanding Player in 1983, when he was also named the Helms Foundation Player of the Year. He was named a consensus first-team All-American in 1984.

After the 1983–84 season, Olajuwon debated whether to stay in college or declare early for the NBA draft. At that time, before the NBA draft lottery was introduced in 1985, the first pick was awarded by coin flip. Olajuwon recalled: "I really believed that Houston was going to win the coin flip and pick the first draft choice, and I really wanted to play in Houston so I had to make that decision (to leave early)." His intuition proved correct, and the toss placed Houston ahead of the Portland Trail Blazers.

== Professional career ==
=== Houston Rockets (1984–2001) ===
==== Olajuwon–Sampson duo (1984–1987) ====
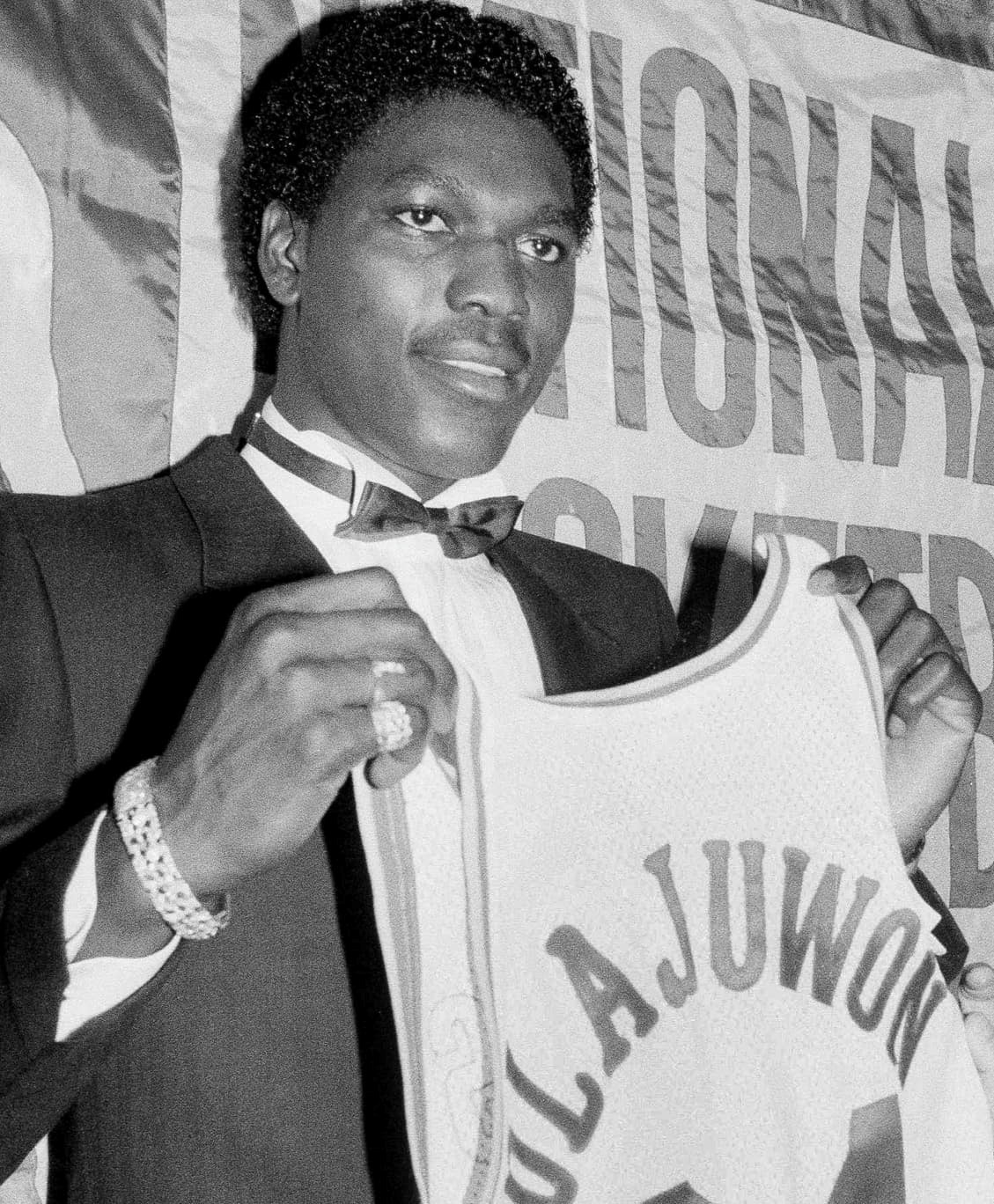
Olajuwon holding his Houston Rockets jersey at conference announcing his signing.

Olajuwon was selected first overall by the Rockets in the 1984 NBA draft. In his autobiography Living the Dream, Olajuwon mentions an intriguing draft trade offered to the Rockets that would have sent Clyde Drexler and the number two pick in the 1984 NBA draft from Portland in exchange for Ralph Sampson. Had the Rockets made the deal, Olajuwon states the Rockets could have selected Michael Jordan with the number two pick to play alongside Olajuwon and Drexler, who had established chemistry playing together during their Phi Slama Jama days in college. Sportswriter Sam Smith speculates that such a trade "would have changed league history and maybe the entire Michael Jordan legend." From 1991 to 1998, every NBA championship team included either Jordan or Olajuwon; furthermore, at least one of Drexler, Jordan, and Olajuwon was involved in every NBA Finals from 1990 to 1998.

Teaming with the 1984 Rookie of the Year, 7 ft 4 in (2.24 m) Ralph Sampson, the "Twin Towers" duo brought immediate success during Olajuwon's rookie season, as their win–loss record improved from a 29–53 record in 1983–84 to 48–34 in 1984–85, and they qualified for the playoffs for the first time in three years. Olajuwon averaged 20.6 points, 11.9 rebounds and 2.68 blocks in his rookie season. He finished as runner-up to Michael Jordan in the 1985 Rookie of the Year voting, and was the only other rookie to receive any votes. The Rockets lost in the first round of the playoffs, three games to two, to the Utah Jazz.

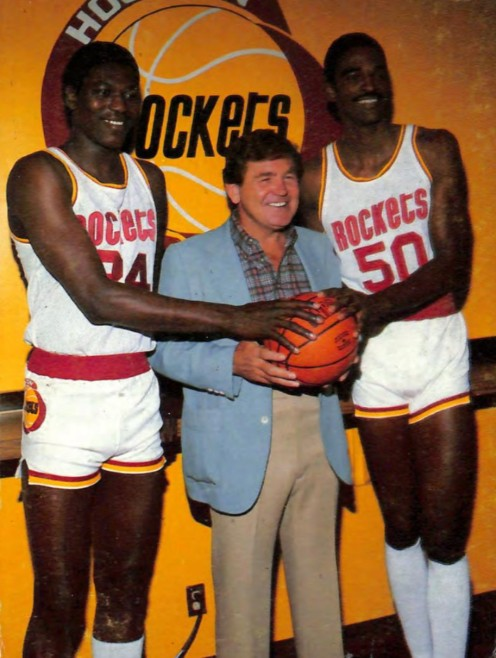
Olajuwon (left) and Ralph Sampson (right) with Rockets head coach Bill Fitch

The Rockets began 1985–86 with a 9–2 record and finished 51–31. Olajuwon averaged 23.5 points, 11.5 rebounds, and 3.4 blocks per game during his second season and was selected to his first All-NBA Team. The team advanced all the way to the Western Conference Finals where they faced the defending champion Los Angeles Lakers. The Rockets won the series fairly easily, four games to one, shocking the sports world and landing Olajuwon on the cover of Sports Illustrated. Olajuwon scored 75 points in victories in games three and four, and after the series Lakers coach Pat Riley remarked "We tried everything. We put four bodies on him. We helped from different angles. He's just a great player." The Rockets advanced to the 1986 NBA Finals where they lost in six games to the Boston Celtics, whose 1986 team is often considered one of the best teams in NBA history.

On March 10, 1987, Olajuwon came remarkably close to recording the first quintuple-double in NBA history that was tracked. In a dominant performance against the Golden State Warriors, Olajuwon recorded 38 points, 17 rebounds, 12 blocks, 7 steals, and 6 assists. The game is widely regarded as one of the most complete individual efforts in basketball history, showcasing Olajuwon's rare two-way dominance. While he fell just four assists and three steals short of the unprecedented feat, his performance remains one of the closest any player has ever come to achieving a quintuple-double in an official NBA game. The Rockets were eliminated in the second round of the 1987 NBA playoffs by the Seattle SuperSonics, but Olajuwon managed to accomplish one feat, putting up a playoff career-high 49 points and 25 rebounds in their final game.

==== Franchise player (1987–1993) ====
Midway through the 1987–88 season, Sampson (who was struggling with knee injuries that would eventually end his career prematurely) was traded to the Golden State Warriors, leaving Olajuwon as the Rockets' undisputed leader. He finished the season averaging 22.8 points, 12.1 rebounds and 2.7 blocks, and placed third in Defensive Player of the Year voting. The Rockets entered the playoffs as the 6th-seed in the West and fell short to the Dallas Mavericks in the first round. The 1988–89 season was the first of Olajuwon's career without head coach Bill Fitch, who was fired in the offseason and replaced by Don Chaney. The Rockets ended the regular season with a record of 45–37, and Olajuwon finished the season as the league leader in rebounds (13.5 per game) by a full rebound per game over Charles Barkley. This performance was consistent with his averages of 24.8 points and 3.4 blocks. Olajuwon posted exceptional playoff numbers of 37.5 ppg and 16.8 rpg, plus a record for points in a four-game playoff series (150). Nevertheless, the Rockets were eliminated in the first round by the Seattle SuperSonics, 3 games to 1.

The 1989–90 season was a disappointment for the Rockets. They finished the season with a 41–41 record, and though they made the playoffs, were eliminated in four games by Los Angeles. Olajuwon put up one of the most productive defensive seasons by an interior player in the history of the NBA. He won the NBA rebounding crown (14.0 per game) again, this time by an even larger margin; a full two rebounds per game over David Robinson, and led the league in blocks by averaging 4.6 per game. He is the only player since the NBA started recording blocked shots in 1973–74 to average 14+ rebounds and 4.5+ blocked shots per game in the same season. In doing so he joined Kareem Abdul-Jabbar and Bill Walton as the only players in NBA history (at that point) to lead the league in rebounding and shot-blocking in the same season. During the season, Olajuwon became the third player in NBA history to record a quadruple-double, when on March 29, 1990, he put up 18 points, 16 rebounds, 11 blocks and 10 assists in a 120–94 win over the Milwaukee Bucks. He also, on April 19, 1990, scored a career-high 52 points in a 130–127 overtime loss to the Denver Nuggets.

Citing Olajuwon's unhappiness with the franchise's management, he was the subject of trade rumors during the 1990 offseason. A Los Angeles radio station cited an unknown source which claimed that Olajuwon requested a trade to the Lakers, which would have sparked a block-buster trade package where the Rockets receive James Worthy, Byron Scott and A.C. Green. However, Rockets owner Charlie Thomas denied any trade to the Lakers was in discussion. He added that if Olajuwon were to be traded, he would be heading to the Eastern Conference. Olajuwon ultimately stayed with the Rockets, who finished the 1990–91 season with a record of 52–30 under NBA Coach of the Year Chaney. Olajuwon averaged 21.8 points per game in 1990–91, but due to an injury to his eyesocket caused by an elbow from Bill Cartwright, did not play in enough games (56) to qualify for the rebounding title. Otherwise, he would have won it for a third consecutive year, averaging 13.8 a game (league leader Robinson averaged 13.0 rpg). He also averaged a league-leading 3.95 blocks per game. However, the Rockets were swept in the playoffs by the LA Lakers.

The following season was a low point for the Rockets during Olajuwon's tenure. They finished 42–40, and missed the playoffs for the first time in Olajuwon's career. He missed two weeks early in the season due to an accelerated heartbeat. Despite his usual strong numbers, he could not lift his team out of mediocrity. Since making the Finals in 1986, the Rockets had made the playoffs five times, but their record in those playoff series was 1–5 and they were eliminated in the first round four times. Following the season, Olajuwon requested a trade in part because of his bad contract; his salary was considerably low for a top center, and his contract specifically forbade re-negotiation. He also expressed displeasure with the organization's efforts to surround him with quality players. He felt the Rockets had cut corners at every turn, and were more concerned with the bottom line than winning. Management had also infuriated Olajuwon during the season when they accused him of faking a hamstring injury because of his unhappiness over his contract situation. His agent cited his differences with the organization as being "irreconcilable", and Olajuwon publicly insulted owner Charlie Thomas and the team's front office. With the 1992–93 season approaching, a reporter for the Houston Chronicle said that Olajuwon being dealt was "as close to a sure thing as there is."

Nonetheless, he was not traded and the Rockets began the season with a new coach, Rudy Tomjanovich. Olajuwon improved his passing in 1992–93, setting a new career-high of 3.5 assists per game. This willingness to pass the ball increased his scoring, making it more difficult for opposing teams to double and triple-team him. Olajuwon set a new career-high with 26.1 points per game. The Rockets set a new franchise record with 55 wins, and advanced to the second round of the playoffs, pushing the Seattle SuperSonics to a seventh game before losing in overtime, 103–100. He earned his first Defensive Player of the Year award and finished as the runner-up in the MVP race to Charles Barkley. The team rewarded him with a four-year contract extension toward the end of the regular season.

==== MVP and championship years (1993–1995) ====
Olajuwon gained a reputation as a clutch performer and as one of the top centers in history based on his performances in the 1993–94 and 1994–95 seasons. He outplayed centers such as Patrick Ewing, David Robinson, Shaquille O'Neal, and Dikembe Mutombo, and other defensive stalwarts such as Dennis Rodman and Karl Malone. Many of his battles were with his fellow Texas-based rival David Robinson of the San Antonio Spurs. In the 30 head–to–head match-ups during the seven seasons from 1989 to 1996, when both Olajuwon and Robinson were in their primes, Olajuwon averaged 26.3 points per game, shooting 47.6% from the field, while Robinson averaged 22.1 and 46.8%.

Olajuwon was crowned league MVP for the 1993–94 season as he led the Rockets to a 58–24 record, making him the first foreign-born player to win the league's MVP award. He also earned his second Defensive Player of the Year award, joining Michael Jordan as the only NBA players at the time to be named MVP and Defensive Player of the Year in the same season. In the 1994 NBA playoffs, the Rockets initially suffered a 0–2 series deficit against the Phoenix Suns in the Western Conference semifinals. The Rockets overcame the Suns and defeated them in a pivotal Game 7 in which Olajuwon put up 37 points. They would go on to defeat the Utah Jazz in five games in the conference finals to make the NBA Finals, where they faced the Eastern Conference champion New York Knicks, led by one of Olajuwon's perennial rivals since his collegiate days, Patrick Ewing. The Rockets initially took a 2–1 series lead before the Knicks took a 3–2 lead into Game 6. The Rockets were defending an 86–84 lead when in the last second, Knicks guard John Starks (who had already scored 27 points) went up for what would have been a Finals-winning three. Olajuwon pulled off a clutch play by blocking the shot as time expired. In Game 7, Olajuwon posted a game–high 25 points and 10 rebounds, which helped defeat the Knicks, bringing the first professional sports championship to Houston since the Houston Oilers won the American Football League championship in 1961. Olajuwon dominated Ewing in their head–to–head match-up, outscoring him in every game of the series and averaging 26.9 points per game on 50% shooting, compared to Ewing's 18.9 and 36.3%. For his efforts Olajuwon was named NBA Finals Most Valuable Player. He thus became the only player in NBA history to win the MVP, the Championship, the Finals MVP, and Defensive Player of the Year awards in the same season.

On December 1, 1994, Olajuwon recorded a triple-double 37 points, 13 rebounds and 12 assists in a 113–109 win over the Golden State Warriors. But despite a slow start by the team, and Olajuwon missing eight games toward the end of the season with anemia, the Rockets repeated as champions in 1995. They were bolstered in part by the acquisition of Clyde Drexler, Olajuwon's former University of Houston "Phi Slama Jama" teammate, in a mid-season trade from the Portland Trail Blazers. Olajuwon averaged 27.8 points, 10.8 rebounds, and 3.4 blocks per game during the regular season. Olajuwon displayed perhaps the most impressive moments of his career during the playoffs in which the Rockets defeated the 3rd–seeded Utah Jazz in the first round, overcame a 3–1 series deficit against the Phoenix Suns in the conference semifinals (the seventh team in NBA history to do so) and defeated the league MVP David Robinson-led San Antonio Spurs in the conference finals. Robinson struggled against Olajuwon's average of 35.3 points on .560 shooting (Robinson's numbers were 23.8 and .449) and was outscored 81–41 in the final two games. In the series-clinching game, Olajuwon recorded 39 points, 17 rebounds and 5 blocks. When asked later what a team could do to "solve" Olajuwon, Robinson told LIFE magazine: "Hakeem? You don't solve Hakeem." The Rockets won every road game that series.

In the first game of the NBA Finals, Olajuwon recorded 31 points and six rebounds as he and Drexler led the Rockets to overcome a 20-point late second quarter deficit and defeat the Orlando Magic, led by a young Shaquille O'Neal, in overtime 120–118, decided by Olajuwon's game-winning tip in off a missed Drexler layup. The Rockets won the series to complete the sixth Finals sweep in NBA history. Olajuwon outscored O'Neal in every game, scoring more than 30 points in each and raising his regular-season rate by five while O'Neal's production dropped by one. Olajuwon was again named Finals MVP. He averaged 33.0 points on .531 shooting, 10.3 rebounds, and 2.81 blocks in the 1995 Playoffs. His combined 131 points were at the time the most-ever points a player amassed in a four-game Finals series (since surpassed by O'Neal in 2002). As in 1994, Olajuwon was the only Rockets All-Star.

==== Post-championship period (1995–2001) ====
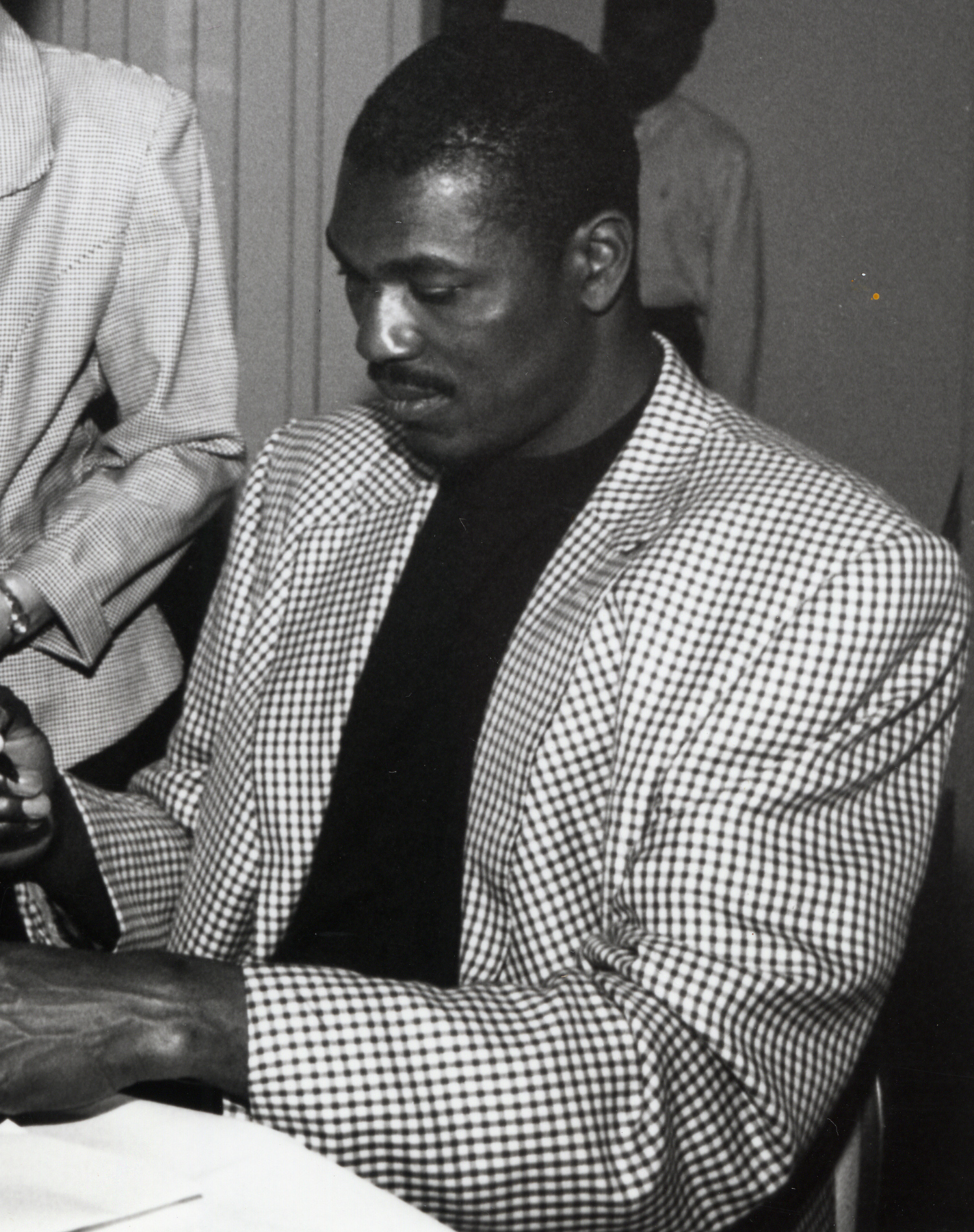
Olajuwon signing autographs

On January 18, 1996, Olajuwon put up a season-high 51 points in a 108–106 loss to the Boston Celtics. In the 1995–96 season, the Rockets won 48 games to place fifth in the Western Conference. Entering the playoffs, they defeated the Los Angeles Lakers in the first round three games to one, with Olajuwon making three pivotal blocks during the final minutes of Game 4 as the Rockets led by single digits. Facing the Seattle SuperSonics in the conference semifinals, the Rockets were criticized for rough play, and Olajuwon was fined $5,000 after elbowing Detlef Schrempf in Game 2. Despite putting up reasonable numbers, Olajuwon struggled to overcome the SuperSonics and the Rockets were swept in four games. Michael Jordan had returned from an 18-month hiatus in March 1995, and his Chicago Bulls dominated the league for the next three years (1996–98). The Bulls and Rockets never met in the NBA Playoffs.

The Rockets saw major improvement in the 1996–97 season when they added Charles Barkley to their roster. They started the season 21–2 and ended 57–25. Olajuwon was named to his sixth All-NBA First Team (his eleventh All-NBA Team altogether). The Rockets swept the Minnesota Timberwolves in the first round of the playoffs and, in a rematch of the prior year's conference semifinals, defeated the SuperSonics in seven games. The Rockets were defeated in the Western Conference Finals by the Utah Jazz in six games. After averaging 26.9 and 23.2 points in 1995–96 and 1996–97 respectively, Olajuwon's point production dipped to 16.4 in 1997–98. He missed much of the season after undergoing knee surgery in November 1997. After the Rockets lost in the first round in five games to the Jazz, Drexler retired. In January 1999, the Rockets acquired veteran All-Star Scottie Pippen and finished 31–19 in the lockout-shortened regular season. Olajuwon's scoring production rose to 18.9 points per game, and he made his twelfth and final All-NBA Team. However, they lost in the first round again, this time to the Lakers.

Pippen was traded to the Portland Trail Blazers shortly before the start of the 1999–2000 season. Houston began to rebuild, bringing in fast-paced league newcomers Shandon Anderson, Cuttino Mobley, and Steve Francis to attempt to stabilize an aging Olajuwon–Barkley duo, both of whom preferred a slower paced offence. Despite this, the Rockets began the season 2–10, including a 0–6 home stretch, and ended the season with their first losing record since 1984. Olajuwon missed 38 games due to recovery from a sports hernia and respiratory issues. Barkley, who missed a majority of the season due to injury, retired thereafter. With his contract expiring, Olajuwon initially opted to retire at the end of the 2000–01 season. He missed 12 games following a December 21, 2000 injury he sustained to his right knee during a matchup against the Lakers. A blood condition he was dealt in March 2001 threatened to end his career, but was cleared to return later that month. The Rockets improved from the previous season with the addition of Maurice Taylor, and finished 45–37. Despite the improvement, they again missed the playoffs as they were two-games short of the 8th-seed claimed by the Timberwolves.

=== Toronto Raptors (2001–2002) ===
On August 2, 2001, after refusing a $13 million deal with the Rockets, Olajuwon was traded to the Toronto Raptors for draft picks (the highest of which was used by Houston to draft Boštjan Nachbar at #15 in the 2002 NBA draft), with the player having a three-year contract that would give him $18 million. In his first game with the Raptors, he scored 11 points in just 22 minutes of playing time against the Magic. Olajuwon averaged career lows of 7.1 points and 6.0 rebounds per game in what would be his final season in the NBA, as he decided to retire in the fall of 2002, due to a back injury. Olajuwon retired as the all–time league leader in total blocked shots with 3,830, although shot-blocking did not become an official statistic until the 1973–74 NBA season.

Shortly after his retirement, his No. 34 jersey was retired by the Rockets. For his NBA career, Olajuwon averaged 21.8 points on 51% shooting, 11.1 rebounds, 2.5 assists, and 3.1 blocks in 1,238 career games.

== National team career ==
In 1980, before arriving in the US, Olajuwon played for a Nigerian junior team in the All-Africa Games. This created some problems when he tried to play for the United States men's national basketball team initially. FIBA rules prohibit players from representing more than one country in international competition, and players must go through a three-year waiting period for any nationality change. Olajuwon was ineligible for selection to the "Dream Team" as he hadn't become a US citizen.

Olajuwon became a naturalized American citizen on April 2, 1993. For the 1996 Olympics, he received a FIBA exemption and was eligible to play for Dream Team III. The team went on to win the gold medal in Atlanta. During the tournament, he shared his minutes with Shaquille O'Neal and David Robinson. He played 7 out of the 8 games and started 2. He averaged 5 points and 3.1 rebounds and had 8 assists and 6 steals in seven games.

== Player profile ==
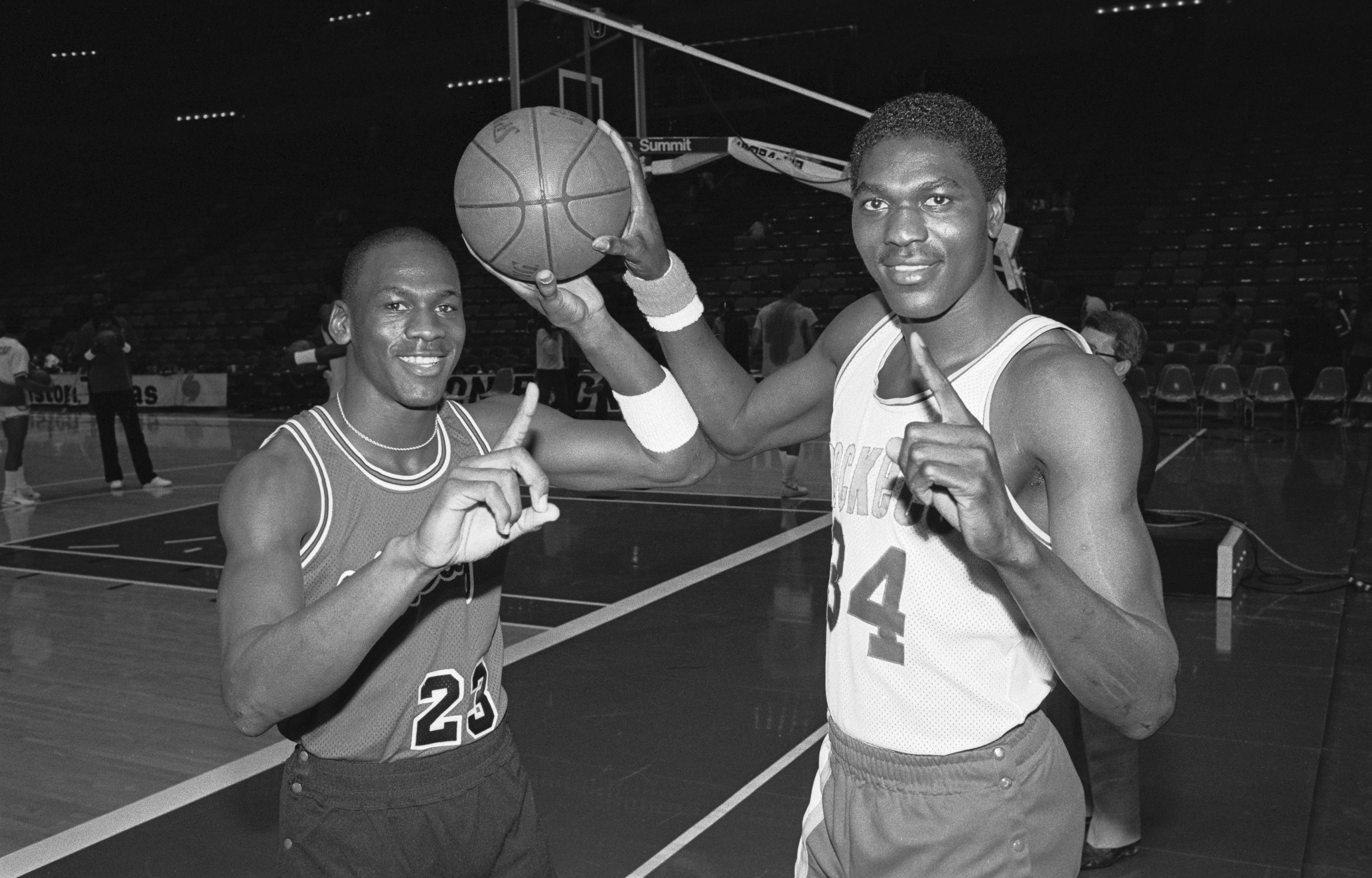
Olajuwon and Michael Jordan in 1985

If I had to pick a center [for an all-time best team], I would take Olajuwon. That leaves out Shaq, Patrick Ewing. It leaves out Wilt Chamberlain. It leaves out a lot of people. And the reason I would take Olajuwon is very simple: he is so versatile because of what he can give you from that position. It's not just his scoring, not just his rebounding or not just his blocked shots. People don't realize he was in the top seven [in NBA history] in steals. He always made great decisions on the court. For all facets of the game, I have to give it to him.

— Michael Jordan

Olajuwon was highly skilled as both an offensive and defensive player. On defense, his rare combination of quickness and strength allowed him to guard a wide range of players effectively. He was noted for both his outstanding shot-blocking ability and his unique talent (for a frontcourt player) for stealing the ball. Olajuwon is the only player in NBA history to record more than 200 blocks and 200 steals in the same season. He averaged 3.09 blocks and 1.75 steals per game for his career. He is the only center to rank among the top ten all-time in steals. Olajuwon was also an outstanding rebounder, with a career average of 11.1 rebounds per game. He led the NBA in rebounding twice, during the 1989 and 1990 seasons. He was twice named the NBA Defensive Player of the Year, and was a five-time NBA All-Defensive First Team selection. In 2022, the NBA renamed its Defensive Player of the Year award as The Hakeem Olajuwon Trophy.

On offense, Olajuwon was famous for his deft shooting touch around the basket and his nimble footwork in the low post. With the ball, Olajuwon displayed a vast array of fakes and spin moves, highlighted in his signature "Dream Shake" (see below). He was a prolific scorer, averaging 21.8 points per game for his career, and an above-average offensive rebounder, averaging 3.3 offensive rebounds per game. Additionally, Olajuwon became a skilled dribbler with an ability to score in "face-up" situations like a perimeter player. He is one of only four players to have recorded a quadruple-double in the NBA, which have only been possible since the 1973–74 season, when blocked shots and steals were first kept as statistics in the NBA. In 2022, to commemorate the NBA's 75th Anniversary The Athletic ranked their top 75 players of all time, and named Olajuwon as the 11th greatest player in NBA history.

=== Dream Shake ===
The best footwork I've ever seen from a big man.

— Pete Newell

Olajuwon established himself as an unusually skilled offensive player for a big man, perfecting a set of fakes and spin moves that became known as his trademark Dream Shake. Executed with uncanny speed and power, they are still regarded as the pinnacle of "big man" footwork. Shaquille O'Neal stated: "Hakeem has five moves, then four countermoves – that gives him 20 moves." Olajuwon himself traced the move back to the soccer-playing days of his youth. "The Dream Shake was actually one of my soccer moves which I translated to basketball. It would accomplish one of three things: one, to misdirect the opponent and make him go the opposite way; two, to freeze the opponent and leave him devastated in his tracks; three, to shake off the opponent and giving him no chance to contest the shot." The Dream Shake was very difficult to defend, much like Kareem Abdul-Jabbar's sky-hook.

One notable Dream Shake happened in Game 2 of the 1995 Western Conference Finals against the Spurs. With David Robinson guarding him, Olajuwon performed a cross-over, drove to the basket and faked a layup. Robinson, an excellent defender, kept up with Olajuwon and remained planted. Olajuwon spun counterclockwise and faked a jump shot. Robinson, who was voted the 1995 NBA MVP, fell for the fake and jumped to block the shot. With Robinson in the air, Olajuwon performed an up-and-under move and made an easy layup.

Olajuwon has referred to basketball as a science, and described his signature move in vivid detail: "When the point guard throws me the ball, I jump to get the ball. But this jump is the set-up for the second move, the baseline move. I call it the 'touch landing.' The defender is waiting for me to come down because I jumped but I'm gone before I land. Defenders say 'Wow, he's quick,' but they don't know that where I'm going is predetermined. He's basing it on quickness, but the jump is to set him up. Before I come down, I make my move. When you jump, you turn as you land. Boom! The defender can't react because he's waiting for you to come down to defend you. Now, the first time when you showed that quickness, he has to react to that quickness, so you can fake baseline and go the other way with your jump hook. All this is part of the Dream Shake. The Dream Shake is you dribble and then you jump; now you don't have a pivot foot. When I dribble I move it so when I come here, I jump. By jumping, I don't have a pivot foot now. I dribble so now I can use either foot. I can go this way or this way. So he's frozen, he doesn't know which way I'm going to go. That is the shake. You put him in the mix and you jump stop and now you have choice of pivot foot. He doesn't know where you're gonna turn and when."

== Personal life ==
Olajuwon married Dalia Asafi on August 8, 1996, in Houston. The couple have four children together. Olajuwon also has an older daughter, Abisola, from a previous relationship with Lita Spencer, whom he met in college. Abisola represented the West Girls in the McDonald's All-American Game and played in the WNBA. Two of his sons, Abdullah and Abdulrahman, represent Jordan in international basketball, making their debut in the 2025 FIBA Asia Cup. Olajuwon is also a cousin of Nigerian Olympic runner and bobsledder Seun Adigun.

In addition to English, Olajuwon is fluent in French, Arabic, and Yoruba. He wrote his autobiography, Living the Dream, with co-author Peter Knobler in 1996. During his 18-year NBA career, Olajuwon earned more than $110 million in salary.

After Olajuwon's rookie year he signed a five-year agreement for $2.5 million, to endorse Etonic Shoes with a Signature line, the Dream Shoe. Later in his career, he signed a shoe endorsement deal with LA Gear, and became the face of Spalding's athletic shoe line and endorsed a sneaker that retailed in various outlets (such as Payless ShoeSource) for $34.99. This made him one of the very few well-known players in any professional sport to endorse a sneaker not from Nike, Reebok, Adidas, or other high-visibility retail brands. As Olajuwon declared: "How can a poor working mother with three boys buy Nikes or Reeboks that cost $120? ... She can't. So kids steal these shoes from stores and from other kids. Sometimes they kill for them."

=== Higher education ===
Attending college was also an important priority for Olajuwon. At the University of Houston, Olajuwon was a physical education major.

=== Muslim faith ===
In Olajuwon's college career and early years in the NBA, he was often undisciplined, talking back to officials, getting into minor fights with other players, and amassing technical fouls. Later, Olajuwon took an active interest in spirituality, becoming a more devout Muslim. On March 9, 1991, he altered his name from Akeem to the more conventional spelling of Hakeem, saying, "I'm not changing the spelling of my name, I'm correcting it". He later recalled, "I studied the Qur'an every day. At home, at the mosque ... I would read it in airplanes, before games and after them. I was soaking up the faith and learning new meanings each time I turned a page. I didn't dabble in the faith, I gave myself over to it." "His religion dominates his life", Drexler said in 1995. Olajuwon was recognized as one of the league's elite centers even while observing Ramadan (i.e., abstaining from food and drink from dawn to sunset during the lunar month of Ramadan on the Islamic calendar), which occurred during the playing season throughout his career. Olajuwon was noted as sometimes playing better during the month of Ramadan, and in 1995 he was named NBA Player of the Month in February, even though Ramadan began on February 1 of that year.

== Post-NBA life ==
Olajuwon played for 20 consecutive seasons in Houston, first collegiately for the University of Houston Cougars and then professionally with the Houston Rockets. He is considered a Houston icon and one of the city's most beloved citizens. Olajuwon has had great success in the Houston real estate market, with his estimated profits exceeding $100 million. He buys in cash-only purchases, as it is against Islamic law to pay interest. Olajuwon splits his time between Jordan, where he moved with his family to pursue Islamic studies, and his ranch near Houston.

In the 2006 NBA offseason, Olajuwon opened his first Big Man Camp, where he teaches young frontcourt players the finer points of playing in the post. While Olajuwon never expressed an interest in coaching a team, he wishes to give back to the game by helping younger players. When asked whether the league was becoming more guard-oriented and big men were being de-emphasized, Olajuwon responded, "For a big man who is just big, maybe. But not if you play with speed, with agility. It will always be a big man's game if the big man plays the right way. On defense, the big man can rebound and block shots. On offense, he draws double-teams and creates opportunities. He can add so much, make it easier for the entire team." He runs the camp for free. Olajuwon has worked with several NBA players, including power forward Emeka Okafor, and center Yao Ming. In September 2009, he also worked with Kobe Bryant on the post moves and the Dream Shake. In 2010, Olajuwon worked with Dwight Howard, helping him diversify his post moves and encouraging more mental focus. In the 2011 offseason, LeBron James flew to Houston and spent time working with Olajuwon. Olajuwon has also worked with Ömer Aşık, Donatas Motiejūnas, Amar'e Stoudemire, Carmelo Anthony, JaVale McGee, and Kenneth Faried. In an interview with the Sporting News in April 2016, Olajuwon said that Kobe Bryant was his best low-post student. He stated, "I’ve worked with a lot of players, but the one who really capitalized on it the most is Kobe Bryant. When I watch him play, he’ll go down in the post comfortably, naturally, and he’ll execute it perfectly."

Olajuwon was inducted into the Naismith Memorial Basketball Hall of Fame as a member of the class of 2008. On April 10, 2008, the Rockets unveiled a sculpture in honor of him outside the Toyota Center.

Olajuwon attended the 2013 NBA draft to bid farewell to retiring commissioner David Stern as Stern made his announcement for the final pick of the first round. Olajuwon was the first pick announced by Stern back in 1984.

On August 1, 2015, Olajuwon made a special appearance for Team Africa at the 2015 NBA Africa exhibition game. He became a member of the FIBA Hall of Fame in 2016.

== Awards and achievements ==
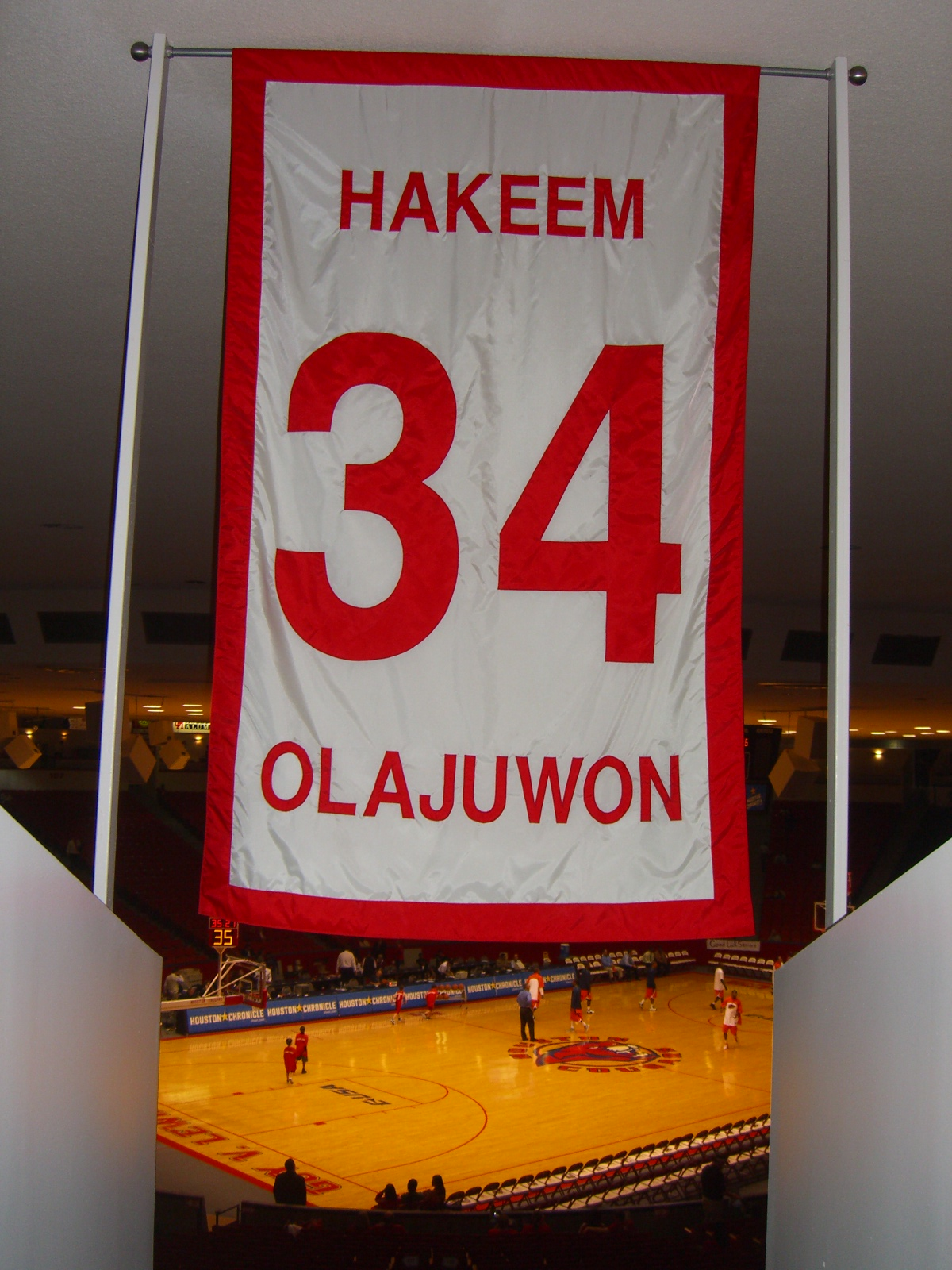
One of only five numbers retired by the University of Houston men's basketball team, Olajuwon's No. 34 hangs in Fertitta Center.

NBA

- 2× NBA champion (1994, 1995)
- 2× NBA Finals MVP (1994, 1995)
- NBA Most Valuable Player (1994)
- 2× NBA Defensive Player of the Year (1993, 1994)
- 12× NBA All-Star (1985–1990, 1992–1997)
- 12x All-NBA Team selections:
  - 6× All-NBA First Team (1987–1989, 1993, 1994, 1997)
  - 3× All-NBA Second Team (1986, 1990, 1996)
  - 3× All-NBA Third Team (1991, 1995, 1999)
- 9x NBA All-Defensive Team selections:
  - 5× NBA All-Defensive First Team (1987, 1988, 1990, 1993, 1994)
  - 4× NBA All-Defensive Second Team (1985, 1991, 1996, 1997)
- NBA All-Rookie First Team (1985)
- 2× NBA rebounding leader (1989, 1990)
- 3× NBA blocks leader (1990, 1991, 1993)
- IBM Award (1992–93)
- Named one of the 50 Greatest Players in NBA History (1996).
- Named to the NBA 75th Anniversary Team
- No. 34 retired by Houston Rockets
- The NBA Defensive Player of the Year award was renamed The Hakeem Olajuwon Trophy (2022)

USA Basketball

- Olympic Gold Medal (1996)

NCAA

- 2× SWC Regular Season Champion (1983, 1984)
- 2× SWC Tournament Champion (1983, 1984)
- NCAA Final Four Most Outstanding Player (1983)
- Helms Foundation Player of the Year (1983)
- Consensus first-team All-American (1984)
  - AP first-team All-American (1984)
  - USBWA first-team All-American (1984)
  - NABC first-team All-American (1984)
  - UPI second-team All-American (1984)
- NCAA rebounding leader (1984)
- SWC Player of the Year (1984)
- First-team All-SWC (1984)
- Second-team All-SWC (1983)
- No. 34 retired by Houston Cougars

Media

- Sporting News NBA MVP (1994)
- Sporting News 1990s NBA All-Decade First Team
- AP 1990s NBA All-Decade Team

Halls of Fame

- Naismith Memorial Basketball Hall of Fame – Class of 2008
- FIBA Hall of Fame – Class of 2016
- Texas Sports Hall of Fame – Class of 1998
- Houston Sports Hall of Fame – Inaugural Class of 2018

NBA Records

- Most blocks in NBA history with 3,830
- Most blocks per game in NBA playoff history with 3.26
- Most blocks in a single NBA playoff with 92
- Only player in NBA history to retire in the top eleven all-time in career blocks, points, rebounds, and steals
- Only player in NBA history to record more than 3,000 blocks and 2,000 steals in a career
- Only player in NBA history to record 200 blocks and 200 steals in the same season (1988–89)
- One of four players in NBA history to record a quadruple-double

Media Rankings

- Ranked #10 in ESPN's All-Time #NBArank: Counting down the greatest players ever (published in 2016)
- Ranked #12 in SLAM Magazine's 2018 revision of the top 100 greatest players of all time (published in the January 2018 issue)

== Career statistics ==
Legend
GP	Games played	GS	Games started	MPG	Minutes per game
FG%	Field goal percentage	3P%	3-point field goal percentage	FT%	Free throw percentage
RPG	Rebounds per game	APG	Assists per game	SPG	Steals per game
BPG	Blocks per game	PPG	Points per game	**Bold**	Career high
†	Won an NBA championship	*	Led the league	‡	NBA record

=== NBA ===
==== Regular season ====
Year	Team	GP	GS	MPG	FG%	3P%	FT%	RPG	APG	SPG	BPG	PPG
1984–85	Houston	**82***	**82***	35.5	**.538**	—	.613	11.9	1.4	1.2	2.7	20.6
1985–86	Houston	68	68	36.3	.526	—	.645	11.5	2.0	2.0	3.4	23.5
1986–87	Houston	75	75	36.8	.508	.200	.702	11.4	2.9	1.9	3.4	23.4
1987–88	Houston	79	79	35.8	.514	.000	.695	12.1	2.1	2.1	2.7	22.8
1988–89	Houston	**82***	**82***	36.9	.508	.000	.696	13.5*	1.8	**2.6**	3.4	24.8
1989–90	Houston	**82***	**82***	38.1	.501	.167	.713	**14.0***	2.9	2.1	**4.6***	24.3
1990–91	Houston	56	50	36.8	.508	.000	.769	13.8	2.3	2.2	3.9*	21.2
1991–92	Houston	70	69	37.7	.502	.000	.766	12.1	2.2	1.8	4.3	21.6
1992–93	Houston	**82**	**82***	39.5	.529	.000	.779	13.0	3.5	1.8	4.2*	26.1
1993–94†	Houston	80	80	**41.0**	.528	**.421**	.716	11.9	**3.6**	1.6	3.7	27.3
1994–95†	Houston	72	72	39.6	.517	.188	.756	10.8	3.5	1.8	3.4	**27.8**
1995–96	Houston	72	72	38.8	.514	.214	.724	10.9	**3.6**	1.6	2.9	26.9
1996–97	Houston	78	78	36.6	.510	.313	**.787**	9.2	3.0	1.5	2.2	23.2
1997–98	Houston	47	45	34.7	.483	.000	.755	9.8	3.0	1.8	2.0	16.4
1998–99	Houston	50*	50*	35.7	.514	.308	.717	9.6	1.8	1.6	2.5	18.9
1999–00	Houston	44	28	23.8	.458	.000	.616	6.2	1.4	.9	1.6	10.3
2000–01	Houston	58	55	26.6	.498	.000	.621	7.4	1.2	1.2	1.5	11.9
2001–02	Toronto	61	37	22.6	.464	.000	.560	6.0	1.1	1.2	1.5	7.1
Career		1,238	1,186	35.7	.512	.202	.712	11.1	2.5	1.7	3.1	21.8
All-Star		12	8	23.2	.409	1.000	.520	7.8	1.4	1.3	1.9	9.8

==== Playoffs ====
Year	Team	GP	GS	MPG	FG%	3P%	FT%	RPG	APG	SPG	BPG	PPG
1985	Houston	5	5	37.4	.477	—	.1000	13.0	1.4	1.4	2.6	21.2
1986	Houston	20	20	38.3	.530	.000	.638	11.8	2.0	2.0	3.5	26.9
1987	Houston	10	10	38.9	**.615**	.000	.742	11.3	2.5	1.3	4.3	29.2
1988	Houston	4	4	40.5	.571	.000	**.884**	**16.8**	1.8	2.3	2.8	**37.5**
1989	Houston	4	4	40.5	.519	—	.680	13.0	3.0	**2.5**	2.8	25.3
1990	Houston	4	4	40.3	.443	—	.706	11.5	2.0	**2.5**	**5.8**	18.5
1991	Houston	3	3	43.0	.578	.000	.824	14.7	2.0	1.3	2.7	22.0
1993	Houston	12	12	**43.2**	.517	.000	.827	14.0	**4.8**	1.8	4.9	25.7
1994†	Houston	**23**	**23**	43.0	.519	**.500**	.795	11.0	4.3	1.7	4.0	28.9
1995†	Houston	22	22	42.2	.531	**.500**	.681	10.3	4.5	1.2	2.8	33.0
1996	Houston	8	8	41.1	.510	.000	.725	9.1	3.9	1.9	2.1	22.4
1997	Houston	16	16	39.3	.590	.000	.731	10.9	3.4	2.1	2.6	23.1
1998	Houston	5	5	38.0	.394	.000	.727	10.8	2.4	1.0	3.2	20.4
1999	Houston	4	4	30.8	.426	—	.875	7.3	0.5	1.3	0.8	13.3
2002	Toronto	5	0	17.2	.545	—	.667	3.8	0.4	1.4	0.8	5.6
Career		145	140	39.6	.528	.222	.719	11.2	3.2	1.7	3.3‡	25.9

=== College ===
Year	Team	GP	GS	MPG	FG%	3P%	FT%	RPG	APG	SPG	BPG	PPG
1981–82	Houston	29	6	18.2	.607	.000	.563	6.2	.4	.9	2.5	8.3
1982–83	Houston	34	34	27.4	.611	.000	**.595**	11.4	.9	1.4	5.1	13.9
1983–84	Houston	**37**	**37**	**34.1**	**.675**	.000	.526	**13.5**	**1.3**	**1.6**	**5.6**	**16.8**
Career		100	77	27.2	.639	.000	.555	10.7	.9	1.3	4.5	13.3

== See also ==
- List of NBA career scoring leaders
- List of NBA franchise career scoring leaders
- List of NBA career rebounding leaders
- List of NBA career steals leaders
- List of NBA career blocks leaders
- List of NBA career turnovers leaders
- List of NBA career personal fouls leaders
- List of NBA career free throw scoring leaders
- List of NBA career games played leaders
- List of NBA career minutes played leaders
- List of NBA career playoff scoring leaders
- List of NBA career playoff rebounding leaders
- List of NBA career playoff steals leaders
- List of NBA career playoff blocks leaders
- List of NBA career playoff turnovers leaders
- List of NBA career playoff free throw scoring leaders
- List of NBA annual rebounding leaders
- List of NBA annual blocks leaders
- List of NBA single-game blocks leaders
- List of NBA single-season blocks per game leaders
- List of NCAA Division I men's basketball season rebounding leaders
- Islam in Houston

== Sources ==
- Harris, Othello, Nolte, Claire Elaine, and Kirsch, George B. Encyclopedia of Ethnicity and Sports in the United States, Greenwood Press. 2000 ISBN 0-313-29911-0
- Heisler, Mark. Big Men Who Shook the NBA. Triumph Books. 2003 ISBN 1-57243-766-9
- Olajuwon, Hakeem with Knobler, Peter. Living the Dream: My Life and Basketball. Little, Brown and Company. 1996 ISBN 0-316-09427-7
- Simmons, Bill, The Book of Basketball: The NBA According to the Sports Guy, ESPN 2009 ISBN 0-345-51176-X
