= Fonde =

Public gym in Houston, Texas, U.S.

Coordinates: 29.7630°N 95.3750°W

The Fonde Recreation Center, often known simply as Fonde (pronounced "fon-DEE") or Fonde Rec, is a public gym near downtown Houston, Texas. Fonde is known for its basketball courts, which have been the proving ground for numerous NCAA and NBA basketball players during the summertime. Among the basketball legends that have played at Fonde are all-time greats such as Hakeem Olajuwon, Moses Malone and Clyde Drexler. Among the most oft-cited anecdotes of Fonde are the Malone–Olajuwon duels during the early 1980s, in which the two future Basketball Hall of Fame centers squared off, with the elder Malone, formerly of the Houston Rockets, testing the skills of the younger Olajuwon, then just a college player with the University of Houston. Fonde has been featured as a playable location in several NBA video games, including the NBA Live series, along with other well-known underground hoops hotbeds such as New York's Rucker Park, Goat Park, and The Cage, Chicago's Jackson Park Cages and Venice Beach.

While many NBA players still play in Houston during the summer, many now play at the privately owned Westside Tennis Club. However, Fonde remains a mecca of basketball, with the Nike Houston Pro City Summer Basketball League being the signature event of the summer, recently featuring NBA stars such as Sam Cassell, Rashard Lewis, Steve Francis, Emeka Okafor and T. J. Ford.
