= San Diego Toreros men's basketball statistical leaders =

The San Diego Toreros men's basketball statistical leaders are individual statistical leaders of the San Diego Toreros men's basketball program in various categories, including points, assists, blocks, rebounds, and steals. Within those areas, the lists identify single-game, single-season, and career leaders. The Toreros represent the University of San Diego in the NCAA's West Coast Conference.

San Diego began competing in intercollegiate basketball in 1955. The NCAA did not officially record assists as a stat until the 1983–84 season, and blocks and steals until the 1985–86 season, but San Diego's record books includes players in these stats before these seasons. These lists are updated through the end of the 2020–21 season.

== Scoring ==
Career
Rk	Player	Points	Seasons
1	Johnny Dee	2,046	2011–12 2012–13 2013–14 2014–15
2	Brandon Johnson	1,790	2005–06 2006–07 2007–08 2008–09 2009–10
3	Gyno Pomare	1,725	2005–06 2006–07 2007–08 2008–09
4	Olin Carter III	1,558	2015–16 2016–17 2017–18 2018–19
5	Stan Washington	1,472	1971–72 1972–73 1973–74
6	Nick Lewis	1,453	2001–02 2002–03 2003–04 2004–05 2005–06
7	Bob Bartholomew	1,394	1977–78 1978–79 1979–80 1980–81
8	Scott Thompson	1,379	1983–84 1984–85 1985–86 1986–87
9	Andre Laws	1,337	1998–99 1999–00 2000–01 2001–02
10	Ryan Williams	1,318	1994–95 1995–96 1997–98 1998–99

Season
Rk	Player	Points	Season
1	Isaiah Pineiro	677	2018–19
2	Brandon Johnson	590	2007–08
3	Johnny Dee	582	2013–14
4	Jason Keep	540	2002–03
	John Jerome	540	1989–90
6	Isaiah Pineiro	533	2017–18
7	Nick Lewis	529	2005–06
	Andre Laws	529	2001–02
9	Johnny Dee	527	2014–15
10	Mike Whitmarsh	525	1983–84

Single game
Rk	Player	Points	Season	Opponent
1	Eric Williams	43	2022–23	Utah State
2	Robert “Pinky” Smith	40	1972–73	Chapman
3	Marty Munn	37	1987–88	Loyola Marymount
	Mike Whitmarsh	37	1982–83	Loyola Marymount
5	Andre Laws	36	2001–02	Washington
6	Doug Harris	35	1994–95	CS Northridge
	Kody Clouet	35	2024–25	Portland
8	Deuce Turner	34	2023–24	Saint Mary's
	Jase Townsend	34	2022–23	Pacific
	Olin Carter III	34	2016–17	Bethesda
	Brandon Gay	34	2004–05	Pepperdine
	Ryan Williams	34	1995–96	Sacramento State

== Rebounds ==
Career
Rk	Player	Rebounds	Seasons
1	Gus Magee	1,000	1966–67 1967–68 1968–69 1969–70
2	Gyno Pomare	864	2005–06 2006–07 2007–08 2008–09
3	Bob Bartholomew	797	1977–78 1978–79 1979–80 1980–81
	Robert “Pinky” Smith	797	1971–72 1972–73 1973–74
5	Scott Thompson	740	1983–84 1984–85 1985–86 1986–87
6	Richard “Buzz” Harnett	723	1974–75 1975–76 1976–77 1977–78
7	Ryan Williams	653	1994–95 1995–96 1997–98 1998–99
8	Chris Manresa	652	2009–10 2010–11 2011–12 2012–13
9	Paul Reynolds	638	1956–57 1957–58
10	Gylan Dottin	595	1988–89 1990–91 1991–92 1992–93

Season
Rk	Player	Rebounds	Season
1	Paul Reynolds	349	1956–57
2	Gus Magee	344	1968–69
3	Isaiah Pineiro	339	2018–19
4	Gus Magee	306	1969–70
5	Robert “Pinky” Smith	292	1972–73
6	Robert “Pinky” Smith	290	1971–72
7	Paul Reynolds	289	1957–58
8	Neil Traub	277	1973–74
9	Jason Keep	274	2002–03
10	Gyno Pomare	265	2006–07
	Gyno Pomare	265	2007–08

Single game
Rk	Player	Rebounds	Season	Opponent
1	Gus Magee	24	1968–69	Trinity

== Assists ==
Career
Rk	Player	Assists	Seasons
1	Christopher Anderson	757	2011–12 2012–13 2013–14 2014–15
2	Brandon Johnson	525	2005–06 2006–07 2007–08 2008–09 2009–10
3	David Fizdale	465	1992–93 1993–94 1994–95 1995–96
4	Stan Washington	451	1971–72 1972–73 1973–74
5	Wayman Strickland	408	1988–89 1989–90 1990–91 1991–92
6	Mike Stockapler	374	1977–78 1978–79 1979–80 1980–81
7	Isaiah Wright	326	2017–18 2018–19
8	Dana White	325	1997–98 1998–99 1999–00 2000–01
9	Brock Jacobsen	311	1995–96 1996–97 1997–98 1998–99
10	Ross DeRogatis	307	2004–05 2005–06 2006–07
	Mike McGrain	307	2001–02 2002–03 2003–04

Season
Rk	Player	Assists	Season
1	Christopher Anderson	216	2013–14
2	Christopher Anderson	197	2014–15
3	David Fizdale	195	1995–96
4	Christopher Anderson	188	2012–13
5	Isaiah Wright	181	2017–18
6	Mike Whitmarsh	169	1983–84

Single game
Rk	Player	Assists	Season	Opponent
1	Mike McGrain	14	2003–04	Winthrop
	Stan Washington	14	1973–74	NA
3	Christopher Anderson	13	2011–12	Portland
	David Fizdale	13	1995–96	UC Irvine
5	Isaiah Wright	12	2017–18	Life Pacific
	Christopher Anderson	12	2014–15	W. Michigan
	Christopher Anderson	12	2013–14	Loyola Marymount
	Christopher Anderson	12	2013–14	New Mexico
	Christopher Anderson	12	2013–14	Grand Canyon
	Roy Morris	12	2002–03	UCSD
	David Fizdale	12	1994–95	Cal Poly - SLO
	Wayman Strickland	12	1989–90	LMU
	Wayman Strickland	12	1989–90	LMU
	Mike Whitmarsh	12	1983–84	Gonzaga

== Steals ==
Career
Rk	Player	Steals	Seasons
1	Christopher Anderson	254	2011–12 2012–13 2013–14 2014–15
2	Brandon Johnson	240	2005–06 2006–07 2007–08 2008–09 2009–10
3	Wayman Strickland	154	1988–89 1989–90 1990–91 1991–92
4	David Fizdale	150	1992–93 1993–94 1994–95 1995–96
5	Andre Laws	144	1998–99 1999–00 2000–01 2001–02
6	Corey Belser	141	2001–02 2002–03 2004–05 2005–06
7	Dana White	131	1997–98 1998–99 1999–00 2000–01
8	Wayne McKinney III	109	2021–22 2022–23 2023–24
9	DeJon Jackson	105	2006–07 2007–08 2008–09 2009–10
10	Gylan Dottin	103	1988–89 1990–91 1991–92 1992–93

Season
Rk	Player	Steals	Season
1	Brandon Johnson	77	2007–08
2	Christopher Anderson	69	2012–13
3	Christopher Anderson	64	2013–14
4	Christopher Anderson	63	2011–12
5	Brandon Johnson	62	2006–07
	Alex Davis	62	1996–97
7	Wayman Strickland	60	1989–90
8	David Fizdale	59	1995–96
9	Christopher Anderson	58	2014–15
10	Corey Belser	57	2004–05

Single game
Rk	Player	Steals	Season	Opponent
	Christopher Anderson	7	2012–13	Tulsa
	Brandon Johnson	7	2007–08	Gonzaga
	Corey Belser	7	2004–05	Creighton
	Mike Whitmarsh	7	1982–83	Gonzaga
5	Ty-Laur Johnson	6	2025–26	Pacific
	Christopher Anderson	6	2011–12	San Francisco
	Trumaine Johnson	6	2008–09	Mississippi State
	Brandon Johnson	6	2007–08	San Jose State
	Brice Vounang	6	2003–04	Santa Clara
	Corey Belser	6	2004–05	UCSD
	Alex Parker	6	1997–98	Northern Arizona
	Alex Davis	6	1996–97	Kansas
	Wayman Strickland	6	1988–89	LMU
	Mike Whitmarsh	6	1983–84	SMC

== Blocks ==
Career
Rk	Player	Blocks	Seasons
1	Jito Kok	269	2012–13 2013–14 2014–15 2015–16
2	Scott Thompson	183	1983–84 1984–85 1985–86 1986–87
3	Gyno Pomare	158	2005–06 2006–07 2007–08 2008–09
4	Yauhen Massalski	144	2017–18 2018–19 2019–20 2020–21
5	Dondi Bell	129	1987–88 1988–89 1989–90 1990–91
6	Dennis Kramer	99	2010–11 2011–12 2012–13 2013–14
7	Nick Lewis	78	2001–02 2002–03 2003–04 2004–05 2005–06
8	Chris Manresa	70	2009–10 2010–11 2011–12 2012–13
	Roberto Mafra	70	2008–09 2009–10
10	Brooks Barnhard	68	1989–90 1991–92 1992–93 1993–94

Season
Rk	Player	Blocks	Season
1	Jito Kok	76	2015–16
2	Jito Kok	75	2014–15
3	Terrell Brown	64	2021–22
4	Jito Kok	63	2013–14
5	Jito Kok	55	2012–13
	Dondi Bell	55	1988–89
7	Scott Thompson	52	1985–86
8	Yauhen Massalski	49	2018–19
	Scott Thompson	49	1984–85
10	Gyno Pomare	48	2007–08

Single game
Rk	Player	Blocks	Season	Opponent
1	Jito Kok	8	2014–15	Loyola Marymount
