= 1983–84 Gonzaga Bulldogs men's basketball team =

American college basketball season

1983–84 Gonzaga Bulldogs men's basketball
- Conference: West Coast Athletic Conference
- Record: 17–11 (6–6 WCAC)
- Head coach: Jay Hillock (3rd season)
- Assistant coaches: Bruce Wilson; Joe Hillock; Rich Alvari
- Home arena: John F. Kennedy; Memorial Pavilion

1983–84 West Coast Athletic Conference men's basketball standings
	Conf.				Overall
Team	W		L	PCT	W		L	PCT
San Diego	9	–	3	.750	18	–	10	.643
Santa Clara	7	–	5	.583	22	–	10	.688
Saint Mary's	7	–	5	.583	12	–	16	.429
Gonzaga	6	–	6	.500	17	–	10	.630
Pepperdine	6	–	6	.500	15	–	13	.536
Loyola Marymount	5	–	7	.417	12	–	15	.444
Portland	2	–	10	.167	11	–	17	.393
Rankings from AP Poll

The 1983–84 Gonzaga Bulldogs men's basketball team represented Gonzaga University of Spokane, Washington, in the 1983–84 NCAA Division I men's basketball season. Led by third-year head coach Jay Hillock, the Bulldogs managed a 17–11 (.607) overall record (6–6 in WCAC, 4th), and played their home games on campus at the John F. Kennedy Memorial Pavilion.

Without a conference tournament, Gonzaga's season was not quite enough to qualify for the 53-team NCAA tournament, the WCAC berth went to champion San Diego (9–3). In earlier non-conference games, Gonzaga met Inland Empire rival Washington State of the Pac-10 at the Spokane Coliseum in December and the Cougars made a late basket and won by a point. Two weeks later, Gonzaga outscored WSU by a point in overtime at the Far West Classic in Portland to halt their losing streak to the Cougars at eleven games. A week later, Gonzaga broke a four-game losing streak to the other Palouse rival, the Idaho Vandals.

Two key senior scorers were lost to injury early in the season: swingman Bryce McPhee played in only six games due to a broken leg (right fibula), and forward Jason Van Nort was sidelined in early January with ongoing issues after knee surgeries. Both redshirted and returned as fifth-year seniors in the following season.

With the active roster depleted to eight players, the coaching staff dipped into the intramural ranks for help and added sophomore Gino Cerchai to the Zags' bench. The 5 ft 11 in (1.80 m) guard saw action in two home games and made both of his free throw attempts, met with great appreciation from the student section.

This Gonzaga team is largely remembered for Spokane native John Stockton; the senior point guard from Gonzaga Prep was a three-year starter and the team leader throughout the season, and was the conference player of the year. Despite flying well below the national radar for the majority of his collegiate career, Stockton was selected 16th overall in the 1984 NBA draft by the Utah Jazz, where he played nineteen seasons. He was named to the NBA All-Star Game ten times, made two appearances in the NBA Finals, and was enshrined in the Naismith Memorial Basketball Hall of Fame in 2009.

== Roster ==
1983–84 Gonzaga Bulldogs men's basketball team
Players
Coaches

Pos.	#	Name	Height	Weight	Year	Previous school	Hometown
G	12	John Stockton	6 ft 1 in (1.85 m)	170 lb (77 kg)	Sr	Gonzaga Prep	Spokane, WA
G	14	Jeff Condill	6 ft 3 in (1.91 m)	175 lb (79 kg)	So	SIU-Edwardsville	Barrington. IL
F	22	Jeff Reinert	6 ft 7 in (2.01 m)	200 lb (91 kg)	Jr	New Mexico	Bellingham, WA
G	23	Mark Matthews	6 ft 4 in (1.93 m)	185 lb (84 kg)	Jr	Ricks JC	Rexburg, ID
G/F	24	Bryce McPhee (injured) (redshirt)	6 ft 3 in (1.91 m)	—	Sr	Bellarmine Prep	Tacoma, WA
F	25	Danny Roe	6 ft 6 in (1.98 m)	195 lb (88 kg)	Fr	St. Maries HS	St. Maries, ID
C	32	Tim Ruff	6 ft 10 in (2.08 m)	245 lb (111 kg)	Jr	Acalanes HS	Walnut Creek, CA
F	33	Jason Van Nort (injured) (redshirt)	6 ft 9 in (2.06 m)	—	Sr
F	34	Dave Clement	6 ft 6 in (1.98 m)	220 lb (100 kg)	Jr	Highline HS	Seattle, WA
F/C	35	Blair Anderson	6 ft 9 in (2.06 m)	215 lb (98 kg)	Sr	Bella Vista HS	Fair Oaks, CA
G	11	Gino Cerchai (W)	5 ft 11 in (1.8 m)	175 lb (79 kg)	So	St. Ignatius Prep	San Francisco, CA

Head coach

- Jay Hillock (Gonzaga)

Assistant coach(es)

- Bruce Wilson
- Joe Hillock
- Rich Alvari

Legend

- (C) Team captain
- (S) Suspended
- (I) Ineligible
- (W) Walk-on
- Injured
- Current redshirt

Roster

== Schedule and results ==
Date time, TV	Rank^{#}	Opponent^{#}	Result	Record	Site city, state
Non-conference regular season
Nov 25, 1983*		Carroll	W 100–57	1–0	John F. Kennedy Memorial Pavilion; Spokane, Washington
Nov 28, 1983*		Central Washington	W 86–54	2–0	John F. Kennedy Memorial Pavilion; Spokane, Washington
Dec 1, 1983*		at Idaho State	W 65–63 ^{OT}	3–0	Holt Arena; Pocatello, Idaho
Dec 3, 1983*		at Boise State	L 54–72	3–1	BSU Pavilion; Boise, Idaho
Dec 7, 1983*		Eastern Washington	W 86–57	4–1	John F. Kennedy Memorial Pavilion; Spokane, Washington
Dec 9, 1983*		at Montana State	W 78–68	5–1	Worthington Arena; Havre, Montana
Dec 12, 1983*		Washington State	L 72–73	5–2	Spokane Coliseum; Spokane, Washington
Dec 17, 1983*		Weber State	L 84–94	5–3	John F. Kennedy Memorial Pavilion; Spokane, Washington
Dec 27, 1983*		vs. Robert Morris; Far West Classic	W 73–57	6–3	Portland, Oregon
Dec 28, 1983*		vs. Oregon; Far West Classic	L 52–72	6–4	Portland, Oregon
Dec 29, 1983*		vs. Washington State; Far West Classic	W 71–70 ^{OT}	7–4	Portland, Oregon
Jan 2, 1984*		at Loyola Marymount	L 68–70 ^{OT}	7–5	Gersten Pavilion; Los Angeles, California
Jan 7, 1984*		at Idaho; Rivalry	W 59–52	8–5	Kibbie Dome (4,100); Moscow, Idaho
Jan 10, 1984*		at Eastern Washington	W 91–80	9–5	Reese Court; Cheney, Washington
Jan 13, 1984*		Seattle Pacific	W 84–67	10–5	John F. Kennedy Memorial Pavilion; Spokane, Washington
WCAC Regular Season
Jan 19, 1984		at San Diego	W 60–58	11–5 (1–0)	USD Sports Center; San Diego, California
Jan 21, 1984		at Saint Mary's	L 51–52	11–6 (1–1)	McKeon Pavilion; Moraga, California
Jan 26, 1984		Pepperdine	L 56–57	11–7 (1–2)	John F. Kennedy Memorial Pavilion; Spokane, Washington
Jan 28, 1984		Loyola Marymount	W 84–66	12–7 (2–2)	John F. Kennedy Memorial Pavilion; Spokane, Washington
Feb 2, 1984		at Santa Clara	L 55–56	12–8 (2–3)	Leavey Center; Santa Clara, California
Feb 7, 1984*		Whitworth	W 66–57	13–8	John F. Kennedy Memorial Pavilion; Spokane, Washington
Feb 11, 1984		Portland	W 73–54	14–8 (3–3)	John F. Kennedy Memorial Pavilion; Spokane, Washington
Feb 18, 1984		Santa Clara	W 73–63	15–8 (4–3)	John F. Kennedy Memorial Pavilion; Spokane, Washington
Feb 24, 1984		at Loyola Marymount	W 73–70	16–8 (5–3)	Gersten Pavilion; Los Angeles, California
Feb 25, 1984		at Pepperdine	L 62–69	16–9 (5–4)	Firestone Fieldhouse; Malibu, California
Mar 1, 1984		Saint Mary's	L 70–72	16–10 (5–5)	John F. Kennedy Memorial Pavilion; Spokane, Washington
Mar 3, 1984		San Diego	L 69–71	16–11 (5–6)	John F. Kennedy Memorial Pavilion; Spokane, Washington
Mar 6, 1984		at Portland	W 56–55	17–11 (6–6)	Howard Hall; Portland, Oregon
*Non-conference game. ^{#}Rankings from AP Poll. (#) Tournament seedings in parentheses.
