= 1983–84 Fresno State Bulldogs men's basketball team =

American college basketball season

1983–84 Fresno State Bulldogs men's basketball

PCAA tournament champion

NCAA tournament
- Conference: Pacific Coast Athletic Association Conference
- Record: 25–8 (13–5 PCAA)
- Head coach: Boyd Grant (7th season)
- Home arena: Selland Arena

1983–84 Pacific Coast Athletic Association men's basketball standings
	Conf.				Overall
Team	W		L	PCT	W		L	PCT
No. 13 UNLV	16	–	2	.889	29	–	6	.829
UC Irvine	14	–	4	.778	19	–	10	.655
Fresno State†	13	–	5	.722	25	–	8	.758
Utah State	12	–	6	.667	19	–	11	.633
New Mexico State	9	–	9	.500	13	–	15	.464
Cal State Fullerton	8	–	10	.444	17	–	13	.567
San Jose State	6	–	12	.333	10	–	18	.357
Long Beach State	6	–	12	.333	9	–	19	.321
UC Santa Barbara	5	–	13	.278	10	–	17	.370
Pacific	1	–	17	.056	3	–	27	.100
† 1984 PCAA tournament winner

The 1983–84 Fresno State Bulldogs men's basketball team represented California State University, Fresno during the 1983–84 NCAA Division I men's basketball season. This was head coach Boyd Grant's 7th season at Fresno State. The Bulldogs played their home games at Selland Arena and were members of the Pacific Coast Athletic Association. They finished the season 25–8, 13–5 in PCAA play to finish 3rd in the conference regular standings. They defeated Cal State Fullerton to win the PCAA tournament and earn the conference's automatic bid to the NCAA tournament. The Bulldogs lost in the opening round to future Hall of Famer Karl Malone and Louisiana Tech, 66–56.

== Roster ==
1983–84 Fresno State Bulldogs men's basketball team
Players	Coaches
Pos. / # / Name / Height / Weight / Year / Previous school / Hometown; F / 34 / Bernard Thompson / 6 ft 6 in (1.98 m) / 200 lb (91 kg) / RS Sr / South Mountain HS / Phoenix, Arizona	Head coach: Boyd Grant (Colorado State); Assistant coach(es) Legend: (C) Team captain; (S) Suspended; (I) Ineligible; (W) Walk-on; Injured; Current redshirt; Roster

== Schedule and results ==
Date time, TV	Rank^{#}	Opponent^{#}	Result	Record	Site city, state
Regular season
Nov 25, 1983*	No. 13	North Dakota State; Sun Met Classic	W 83–54	1–0	Selland Arena; Fresno, California
Nov 26, 1983*	No. 13	Purdue; Sun Met Classic	L 55–56	1–1	Selland Arena; Fresno, California
Nov 29, 1983*	No. 17	Abilene Christian	W 74–55	2–1	Selland Arena; Fresno, California
Dec 1, 1983*	No. 17	UC Davis	W 92–49	3–1	Selland Arena; Fresno, California
Dec 8, 1983*	No. 20	at Portland	W 70–45	4–1	Howard Hall; Portland, Oregon
Dec 10, 1983*	No. 20	at Boise State	L 52–60	4–2	BSU Pavilion; Boise, Idaho
Dec 19, 1983*		No. 15 Oregon State	W 60–47	5–2	Selland Arena; Fresno, California
Dec 22, 1983*		Southwestern Louisiana	W 81–66	6–2	Selland Arena; Fresno, California
Dec 25, 1983*		at Chaminade; Chaminade Classic	W 66–59	7–2	Honolulu, Hawaii
Dec 26, 1983*		vs. No. 3 Houston; Chaminade Classic	W 68–61	8–2	Honolulu, Hawaii
Jan 7, 1984		Pacific	W 65–47	9–2 (1–0)	Selland Arena; Fresno, California
Jan 12, 1984		UC Santa Barbara	W 69–51	10–2 (2–0)	Selland Arena; Fresno, California
Mar 3, 1984		at Long Beach State	W 79–58	22–7 (13–5)	Long Beach Arena; Long Beach, California
PCAA Tournament
Mar 8, 1984*		vs. Cal State Fullerton; Quarterfinals	W 53–51	23–7	The Forum; Inglewood, California
Mar 9, 1984*		vs. UC Irvine; Semifinals	W 71–57	24–7	The Forum; Inglewood, California
Mar 10, 1984*		vs. No. 10 UNLV; Championship game	W 51–49	25–7	The Forum; Inglewood, California
NCAA Tournament
Mar 15, 1984*	(7 MW)	vs. (10 MW) Louisiana Tech; First round	L 56–66	25–8	Mid-South Coliseum; Memphis, Tennessee
*Non-conference game. ^{#}Rankings from AP poll. (#) Tournament seedings in parentheses. MW=Midwest.

== NBA draft ==
Round	Pick	Player	NBA club
1	19	Bernard Thompson	Portland Trail Blazers
