= Henry Egan =

Henry Egan may refer to:

- Henry Chandler Egan or Chandler Egan (1884–1936), American golfer
- Henry Patrick Egan Jr. or Hank Egan (born 1937), American basketball coach
