= Corey Alexander =

Corey Alexander may refer to:

- Corey Alexander Belser (born 1982), former American professional basketball player
- Cory Alexander (born 1973), American former professional basketball player
