= 1986–87 San Diego Toreros men's basketball team =

American college basketball season

1986–87 San Diego Toreros men's basketball

WCAC regular season champions

NCAA tournament, first round
- Conference: West Athletic Coast Conference
- Record: 24–6 (13–1 WCAC)
- Head coach: Hank Egan (3rd season)
- Home arena: USD Sports Center

1986–87 West Coast Athletic Conference men's basketball standings
	Conf.				Overall
Team	W		L	PCT	W		L	PCT
San Diego	13	–	1	.929	24	–	6	.800
Gonzaga	9	–	5	.643	18	–	10	.643
Saint Mary's	7	–	7	.500	17	–	13	.567
Portland	6	–	8	.429	14	–	14	.500
Santa Clara †	6	–	8	.429	18	–	14	.563
San Francisco	6	–	8	.429	16	–	12	.571
Pepperdine	5	–	9	.357	12	–	18	.400
Loyola Marymount	4	–	10	.286	12	–	16	.429
† Conference tournament winner Rankings from AP poll

1986–87 San Diego Toreros men's basketball team represented University of San Diego during the 1986–87 men's college basketball season. The Toreros were led by head coach Hank Egan and played their home games at USD Sports Center. After winning the regular season conference title, they received an at-large bid to the NCAA tournament where they lost in the first round to Auburn.

== Roster ==
1986–87 San Diego Toreros men's basketball team
Players	Coaches
Pos. / # / Name / Height / Weight / Year / Hometown; C / 33 / Scott Thompson / 7 ft 0 in (2.13 m) / 255 lb (116 kg) / Sr / Citrus Heights, California	Head coach: Hank Egan (Navy); Assistant coach(es) Legend: (C) Team captain; (S) Suspended; (I) Ineligible; (W) Walk-on; Injured; Current redshirt; Roster

== Schedule and results ==
Date time, TV	Rank^{#}	Opponent^{#}	Result	Record	Site city, state
Regular season
Nov 28, 1986*		at Utah	W 60–57	1–0	Jon M. Huntsman Center; Salt Lake City, Utah
Dec 4, 1986*		Boise State	W 54–52	2–0	USD Sports Center; San Diego, California
Dec 6, 1986*		at Nevada	L 80–81 ^{OT}	2–1	Lawlor Events Center; Reno, Nevada
Dec 8, 1986*		at Montana State	L 66–76	2–2	Worthington Arena; Havre, Montana
Dec 11, 1986*		at San Diego State	W 83–67	3–2	San Diego Sports Arena; San Diego, California
Dec 13, 1986*		at UC Santa Barbara	W 77–71	4–2	The Thunderdome; Santa Barbara, California
Dec 19, 1986*		vs. Long Beach State	W 60–55	5–2	
Dec 20, 1986*		at Boise State	L 56–71	5–3	BSU Pavilion; Boise, Idaho
Dec 23, 1986*		Rice	W 48–47	6–3	USD Sports Center; San Diego, California
Dec 27, 1986*		Loyola (MD)	W 87–60	7–3	USD Sports Center; San Diego, California
Dec 31, 1986*		Colorado	W 61–51	8–3	USD Sports Center; San Diego, California
Dec 29, 1986*		Ohio Northern	W 54–28	9–3	USD Sports Center; San Diego, California
Jan 8, 1987		at Portland	W 61–59	10–3 (1–0)	Chiles Center; Portland, Oregon
Jan 10, 1987		at Gonzaga	L 46–58	10–4 (1–1)	The Kennel; Spokane, Washington
Jan 15, 1987		Santa Clara	W 73–51	11–4 (2–1)	USD Sports Center; San Diego, California
Jan 17, 1987		San Francisco	W 68–56	12–4 (3–1)	USD Sports Center; San Diego, California
Jan 23, 1987		at San Francisco	W 77–74	13–4 (4–1)	War Memorial Gymnasium; San Francisco, California
Jan 24, 1987		at Santa Clara	W 80–61	14–4 (5–1)	Leavey Center; Santa Clara, California
Jan 29, 1987		Loyola Marymount	W 82–48	15–4 (6–1)	USD Sports Center; San Diego, California
Jan 31, 1987		Pepperdine	W 69–66	16–4 (7–1)	USD Sports Center; San Diego, California
Feb 6, 1987		at Pepperdine	W 78–73	17–4 (8–1)	Firestone Fieldhouse; Malibu, California
Feb 7, 1987		at Loyola Marymount	W 88–82	18–4 (9–1)	Gersten Pavilion; Los Angeles, California
Feb 12, 1987*		U.S. International	W 113–72	19–4	USD Sports Center; San Diego, California
Feb 14, 1987		Saint Mary's	W 54–42	20–4 (10–1)	USD Sports Center; San Diego, California
Feb 19, 1987		Gonzaga	W 61–48	21–4 (11–1)	USD Sports Center; San Diego, California
Feb 21, 1987		Portland	W 64–44	22–4 (12–1)	USD Sports Center; San Diego, California
Feb 25, 1987		at Saint Mary's	W 61–50	23–4 (13–1)	McKeon Pavilion; Moraga, California
West Coast Conference tournament
Feb 28, 1987*	(1)	(8) Loyola Marymount; Quarterfinals	W 99–84	24–4	USD Sports Center; San Diego, California
Mar 1, 1987*	(1)	vs. (7) Pepperdine; Semifinals	L 63–64	24–5	War Memorial Gymnasium; San Francisco, California
NCAA tournament
Mar 12, 1987*	(9 MW)	vs. (8 MW) Auburn; First round	L 61–62	24–6	RCA Dome; Indianapolis, Indiana
*Non-conference game. ^{#}Rankings from AP Poll. (#) Tournament seedings in parentheses. MW=Midwest.

== Awards and honors ==
- Scott Thompson – WCAC Player of the Year
- Hank Egan – WCAC Coach of the Year
