= 1983–84 San Diego Toreros men's basketball team =

American college basketball season

1983–84 San Diego Toreros men's basketball

West Coast Athletic Conference champions

NCAA tournament
- Conference: West Athletic Coast Conference
- Record: 18–10 (9–3 WCAC)
- Head coach: Jim Brovelli (11th season)
- Assistant coaches: John Cosentino (6th season); Gus Magee (11th season); David Babcock (2nd season)
- Home arena: USD Sports Center

1983–84 West Coast Athletic Conference men's basketball standings
	Conf.				Overall
Team	W		L	PCT	W		L	PCT
San Diego	9	–	3	.750	18	–	10	.643
Santa Clara	7	–	5	.583	22	–	10	.688
Saint Mary's	7	–	5	.583	12	–	16	.429
Gonzaga	6	–	6	.500	17	–	10	.630
Pepperdine	6	–	6	.500	15	–	13	.536
Loyola Marymount	5	–	7	.417	12	–	15	.444
Portland	2	–	10	.167	11	–	17	.393
Rankings from AP Poll

1983–84 San Diego Toreros men's basketball team represented University of San Diego during the 1983–84 men's college basketball season. The Toreros were led by head coach Jim Brovelli and played their home games at USD Sports Center. After having just a .500 conference winning percentage after six conference games, the team won their final six WCAC games to secure the regular season conference title. San Diego received a bid to the NCAA tournament where they lost in the play-in round to Princeton. It was the first time in program history the Toreros won the WCAC (now WCC) title as well as their first appearance in the NCAA Tournament. The team was led by all-conference forward Mike Whitmarsh, who was a runner-up that year for the conference player of the year award. Brovelli was named the conference coach of the year.

== Roster ==
1983–84 San Diego Toreros men's basketball team
Players
Coaches

Pos.	#	Name	Height	Weight	Year	Hometown
F	32	Mike Whitmarsh	6 ft 7 in (2.01 m)	205 lb (93 kg)	Sr	San Diego, California
C	33	Scott Thompson	7 ft 0 in (2.13 m)	245 lb (111 kg)	Fr	Citrus Heights, California
F	34	Anthony Reuss	6 ft 7 in (2.01 m)	200 lb (91 kg)	Jr	El Cajon, California

Head coach

- Jim Brovelli (San Francisco)

Assistant coach(es)

Legend

- (C) Team captain
- (S) Suspended
- (I) Ineligible
- (W) Walk-on
- Injured
- Current redshirt

Roster

== Schedule and results ==
Date time, TV	Rank^{#}	Opponent^{#}	Result	Record	Site city, state
Regular season
Nov ?, 1983*		Saint John's (MN)	W 94–59	1–0	USD Sports Center; San Diego, California
Nov 26, 1983*		Army	W 87–57	2–0	USD Sports Center; San Diego, California
Nov 28, 1983*		Long Beach State	L 65–73	2–1	USD Sports Center; San Diego, California
Dec 1, 1983*		at Texas Tech	L 53–64	2–2	Lubbock Municipal Coliseum; Lubbock, Texas
Dec 3, 1983*		at Northern Arizona	L 63–70	2–3	Walkup Skydome; Flagstaff, Arizona
Dec ?, 1983*		Spring Arbor (MI)	W 83–54	3–3	USD Sports Center; San Diego, California
Dec 17, 1983*		UC Irvine	W 85–77	4–3	USD Sports Center; San Diego, California
Dec 19, 1983*		at UC Santa Barbara	L 66–75	4–4	The Thunderdome; Santa Barbara, California
Dec 22, 1983*		Idaho State	W 81–69	5–4	USD Sports Center; San Diego, California
Dec 28, 1983*		vs. Florida A&M	W 78–52	6–4	Lawlor Events Center; Reno, Nevada
Dec 29, 1983*		at Nevada	L 66–70	6–5	Lawlor Events Center; Reno, Nevada
Jan 2, 1984*		Idaho	W 92–64	7–5	USD Sports Center; San Diego, California
Jan 5, 1984*		at San Diego State	L 47–61	7–6	San Diego Sports Arena; San Diego, California
Jan 7, 1984*		Western Illinois	W 81–62	8–6	USD Sports Center; San Diego, California
Jan ?, 1984*		Mount Marty	W 70–48	9–6	USD Sports Center; San Diego, California
Jan 19, 1984		Gonzaga	L 58–60	9–7 (0–1)	USD Sports Center; San Diego, California
Jan 21, 1984		Portland	W 65–63	10–7 (1–1)	USD Sports Center; San Diego California
Jan 28, 1984		Santa Clara	W 69–62	11–7 (2–1)	USD Sports Center; San Diego, California
Feb 3, 1984		at Loyola Marymount	W 75–73	12–7 (3–1)	Gersten Pavilion; Los Angeles, California
Feb 4, 1984		at Pepperdine	L 64–67	12–8 (3–2)	Firestone Fieldhouse; Malibu, California
Feb 11, 1984		at Saint Mary's	L 71–79	12–9 (3–3)	McKeon Pavilion; Moraga, California
Feb 16, 1984		Pepperdine	W 56–55	13–9 (4–3)	USD Sports Center; San Diego, California
Feb 18, 1984		Loyola Marymount	W 60–56	14–9 (5–3)	USD Sports Center; San Diego, California
Feb 23, 1984		at Santa Clara	W 63–61	15–9 (6–3)	Leavey Center; Santa Clara, California
Mar 1, 1984		at Portland	W 63–56	16–9 (7–3)	Memorial Coliseum; Portland, Oregon
Mar 3, 1984		at Gonzaga	W 71–69 ^{2OT}	17–9 (8–3)	John F. Kennedy Memorial Pavilion; Spokane, Washington
Mar 6, 1984		Saint Mary's	W 68–59	18–9 (9–3)	USD Sports Center; San Diego, California
NCAA Tournament
Mar 13, 1984*	(12 W)	vs. (12 W) Princeton; Play-in game	L 56–65	18–10	The Palestra; Philadelphia, Pennsylvania
*Non-conference game. ^{#}Rankings from AP Poll. (#) Tournament seedings in parentheses. W=West.

== Awards and honors ==
- Scott Thompson – WCAC Newcomer of the Year
- Jim Brovelli – WCAC Coach of the Year
