= Mike Whitmarsh =

American volleyball and basketball player

Personal information
- Born: Michael John Whitmarsh; May 18, 1962; San Diego, California, U.S.
- Died: February 17, 2009 (aged 46); Solana Beach, California, U.S.
- Height: 6 ft 7 in (2.01 m)
- Education: University of San Diego
Medal record
Men's beach volleyball
Representing the United States
Olympic Games
| Silver medal – second place | 1996 Atlanta | Beach |
World Championships
| Silver medal – second place | 1997 Los Angeles | Beach |
World Tour
| Bronze medal – third place | 2003 Carson | Beach |

Michael John Whitmarsh (May 18, 1962 – February 17, 2009) was an American volleyball and basketball player. He won the silver medal in the men's inaugural beach volleyball tournament at the 1996 Summer Olympics in Atlanta, partnering with Mike Dodd. Throughout his volleyball career, Whitmarsh earned over $1.6 million as well as 28 tournament wins.

Whitmarsh played college basketball for the San Diego Toreros. He was a two-time all-conference player in the West Coast Athletic Conference (WCAC), known now as the West Coast Conference, and led San Diego to their first-ever conference title in 1984. He played professional basketball for three years in Europe before turning to volleyball.

== Early life ==
Whitmarsh was born in San Diego. He played basketball at Monte Vista High in Spring Valley, California, and later Grossmont College in El Cajon. He did not take academics seriously as a freshman at Grossmont and did not think he had a chance to get an athletic scholarship until Toreros coach Jim Brovelli showed interest in him. Lacking the units to be admitted into the University of San Diego (USD), Whitmarsh committed himself to studying.

== College career ==
The 6-foot-7-inch (2.01 m) Whitmarsh played college basketball at USD. He started all 24 games as a junior, averaging 15.3 points and 5.3 rebounds per game and earning all-conference honors in the WCAC. As a senior in 1983–84, he averaged 18.8 points and 7.3 rebounds and led the Toreros to an 18–10 record and the 1984 NCAA tournament. In the final game of the regular season against Saint Mary's, he had 24 points and six rebounds in a 68–59 win to clinch the Torreros' first-ever WCAC title. He was named All-WCAC again, and was runner-up to John Stockton in the voting for the WCAC Player of the Year.

== Professional career ==
Whitmarsh was drafted by the NBA's Portland Trail Blazers in the fifth round in 1984. He also narrowly missed making the roster of the Minnesota Timberwolves, and played professionally in Germany for three years before abandoning basketball in favor of beach volleyball. Transitioning from the indoor hard court to the soft sand of beach volleyball (which is often played under hot and humid conditions) was not easy, and he developed a reputation for cramping late in tournaments.

Whitmarsh quickly adapted to the beach with his powerful blocks at the net and won over the fans. In 1990, he was selected as Rookie of the Year by the AVP. In 2001, he was ranked number 1 in the AVP. In 2002, he was named the Best Blocker by the AVP. He retired from beach volleyball in 2004.

== Death ==
Whitmarsh was in the midst of a divorce from his wife Cindy and was found dead in a friend's garage on Wednesday, February 17, 2009, leaving behind two young daughters. According to the San Diego County medical examiner, he died of suicide from inhalation of carbon monoxide from automobile exhaust.

== Awards and honors ==
- AVP Rookie of the Year 1990
- AVP King of the Beach 2000
- AVP Best Blocker 2002
- AVP Lifetime Achievement 2004
- AVP Role Model Award 2003
- AVP Special Achievement 2003
