= 1984 Big Sky Conference men's basketball tournament =

- Classification: Division I
- Season: 1983–84
- Teams: 8
- Site: Dee Events Center; Ogden, Utah
- Champions: Nevada (1st title)
- Winning coach: Sonny Allen (1st title)
- MVP: Curtis High (Nevada)

1983–84 Big Sky men's basketball standings
	Conf.				Overall
Team	W		L	PCT	W		L	PCT
Weber State	12	–	2	.857	23	–	8	.742
Montana	9	–	5	.643	23	–	7	.767
Montana State	7	–	7	.500	14	–	15	.483
Nevada †	7	–	7	.500	17	–	14	.548
Idaho State	6	–	8	.429	12	–	19	.387
Boise State	6	–	8	.429	15	–	12	.556
Northern Arizona	5	–	9	.357	13	–	14	.481
Idaho	4	–	10	.286	9	–	19	.321
† 1984 Big Sky tournament winner

The 1984 Big Sky Conference men's basketball tournament was held March 9–10 at the Dee Events Center at Weber State College in Ogden, Utah.

Fourth-seeded Nevada defeated Montana in the championship game, 71–69, to clinch their first Big Sky tournament title. In the semifinals, the Wolf Pack shocked regular season champion, defending tournament champion, and host Weber State by seventeen points.

== Format ==
For the first time, all eight Big Sky members participated in the conference tournament. Teams were again seeded based on regular season conference records, and all were entered into the quarterfinal round, which was held on the home courts of the top four seeds on Tuesday. The semifinals (Friday) and finals (Saturday) were hosted by the highest remaining seed; the top four seeds all advanced.

== Bracket ==
Quarterfinals; Tuesday, March 6 (four sites)
1	Weber State	67
8	Idaho	58
5	Idaho State	59
4	Nevada	64
3	Montana State	65
6	Boise State	64
7	Northern Arizona	54
2	Montana	69

Semifinals; Friday, March 9
1	Weber State	68
4	Nevada	85
3	Montana State	64
2	Montana	76

Championship; Saturday, March 10
4	Nevada	71
2	Montana	69

== NCAA tournament ==
Nevada (17–13) received an automatic bid to the 53-team NCAA tournament, their first Division I tournament appearance. Seeded eleventh in the West regional, the Wolf Pack lost by ten points to sixth seed Washington in the first round in Pullman, Washington. Weber State played in the 32-team NIT, winning the opener at home over Fordham by twelve, then fell by two in double overtime at Southwestern Louisiana.
