= 1983–84 UC Irvine Anteaters men's basketball team =

American college basketball season

1983–84 UC Irvine Anteaters men's basketball
- Conference: Pacific Coast Athletic Association
- Record: 19–10 (14–4 PCAA)
- Head coach: Bill Mulligan (4th season)
- Assistant coaches: Mike Bokosky; Herb Livsey
- Home arena: Crawford Hall

1983–84 Pacific Coast Athletic Association men's basketball standings
	Conf.				Overall
Team	W		L	PCT	W		L	PCT
No. 13 UNLV	16	–	2	.889	29	–	6	.829
UC Irvine	14	–	4	.778	19	–	10	.655
Fresno State†	13	–	5	.722	25	–	8	.758
Utah State	12	–	6	.667	19	–	11	.633
New Mexico State	9	–	9	.500	13	–	15	.464
Cal State Fullerton	8	–	10	.444	17	–	13	.567
San Jose State	6	–	12	.333	10	–	18	.357
Long Beach State	6	–	12	.333	9	–	19	.321
UC Santa Barbara	5	–	13	.278	10	–	17	.370
Pacific	1	–	17	.056	3	–	27	.100
† 1984 PCAA tournament winner

The 1983–84 UC Irvine Anteaters men's basketball team represented the University of California, Irvine during the 1983–84 NCAA Division I men's basketball season. The Anteaters were led by fourth year head coach Bill Mulligan and played their home games at the Crawford Hall. They were members of the Pacific Coast Athletic Association. They finished the season 19–10 and 14–4 in PCAA play.

== Previous season ==
The 1982–83 Anteaters returned only two players from the 1981–82 Anteaters team that won 23 wins and finished with a record of 16–12 and 8–8 in PCAA play.

== Off-season ==
=== Incoming transfers ===
Name	Pos.	Height	Weight	Year	Hometown	Notes
Johnny Rogers	F	6'10"	225	Jr	Fullerton, CA	Transfer from Stanford

== Roster ==
1983–84 UC Irvine Anteaters men's basketball team
Players
Coaches

Pos.	#	Name	Height	Weight	Year	Hometown
G		Michael Beans	6 ft 2 in (1.88 m)	—	Sr
F		Troy Carmon	6 ft 6 in (1.98 m)	—	Jr
C		Rick Ciaccio	6 ft 10 in (2.08 m)	—	So
F		Ronnie Grandison	6 ft 6 in (1.98 m)	215 lb (98 kg)	So	Los Angeles, CA
G		Jerome Lee	6 ft 1 in (1.85 m)	—	Jr
F		Ben McDonald	6 ft 8 in (2.03 m)	210 lb (95 kg)	Sr	Torrance, CA
G		Brian Mulligan	5 ft 8 in (1.73 m)	—	Jr
C		Tod Murphy	6 ft 9 in (2.06 m)	220 lb (100 kg)	So	Lakewood, CA
F		Bob Thornton	6 ft 10 in (2.08 m)	225 lb (102 kg)	Sr	Los Angeles, CA
G		George Turner	6 ft 2 in (1.88 m)	—	Sr

Head coach

Bill Mulligan

Assistant coach(es)

- Mike Bokosky

Legend

- (C) Team captain
- (S) Suspended
- (I) Ineligible
- (W) Walk-on
- Injured
- Current redshirt

Roster
Last update: September 15, 2017

== Schedule ==
Date time, TV	Rank^{#}	Opponent^{#}	Result	Record	Site (attendance) city, state
Non-Conference Season
November 28, 1983*		Idaho	W 91–71	1–0	Anaheim Convention Center (1,980); Anaheim, CA
November 30, 1983*		at Pepperdine	L 81–83	1–1	Firestone Fieldhouse (2,122); Malibu, CA
December 3, 1983*		at San Diego State	W 79–76	2–1	Peterson Gym (3,590); San Diego, CA
December 10, 1983*		Colorado	L 86–95	2–2	Anaheim Convention Center (1,722); Anaheim, CA
December 13, 1983*		at USC	W 78–66	3–2	Los Angeles Memorial Sports Arena (2,812); Los Angeles, CA
December 17, 1983*		at San Diego	L 77–86	3–3	USD Sports Center (570); San Diego, CA
December 21, 1983*		Montana	W 91–83	4–3	Crawford Hall (1,279); Irvine, CA
December 29, 1983*		vs. Weber State; Utah Classic	L 65–83	4–4	Special Events Center (12,608); Salt Lake City, UT
December 30, 1983*		vs. Utah; Utah Classic	L 80–84	4–5	Special Events Center (12,020); Salt Lake City
Conference Season
January 05, 1984		New Mexico State	W 110–78	5–5 (1–0)	Crawford Hall (1,173); Irvine, CA
January 7, 1984		Long Beach State	W 82–67	6–5 (2–0)	Crawford Hall (1,392); Irvine, CA
January 9, 1984		at No. 18 UNLV	L 68–83	6–6 (2–1)	Thomas & Mack Center (14,103); Paradise, NV
January 12, 1984		at Utah State	L 68–71	6–7 (2–2)	Smith Spectrum (8,465); Logan, UT
January 14, 1984		at San Jose State	W 77–72	7–7 (3–2)	Jose Jose Civic Auditorium (612); San Jose, CA
January 19, 1984		No. 17 Fresno State	W 63–57	8–7 (4–2)	Crawford Hall (1,467); Irvine, CA
January 21, 1984		Pacific	W 93–72	9–7 (5–2)	Crawford Hall (1,157); Irvine, CA
January 26, 1984		at Cal State Fullerton	W 81–80	10–7 (6–2)	Titan Gym (4,014); Fullerton, CA
January 29, 1984		at UC Santa Barbara	W 78–67	11–7 (7–2)	UC Santa Barbara Events Center (660); Santa Barbara, CA
February 2, 1984		at Long Beach State	W 100–84	12–7 (8–2)	Long Beach Arena (1,648); Long Beach, CA
February 5, 1984		at New Mexico State	L 77–102	12–8 (8–3)	Pan American Center (8,893); Las Cruces, NM
February 9, 1984		San Jose State	W 64–53	13–8 (9–3)	Crawford Hall (1,328); Irvine, CA
February 11, 1984		Utah State	W 69–67	14–8 (10–3)	Crawford Hall (1,467); Irvine, CA
February 16, 1984		at Fresno State	L 56–65	14–9 (10–4)	Selland Arena (6,582); Fresno, CA
February 20, 1984		at Pacific	W 97–66	15–9 (11–4)	Alex G. Spanos Center (1,858); Stockton, CA
February 23, 1984		UC Santa Barbara	W 58–56	16–9 (12–4)	Crawford Hall (1,249); Irvine, CA
March 1, 1984		No. 7 UNLV	W 77–74	17–9 (13–4)	Crawford Hall (1,467); Irvine, CA
March 3, 1984		Cal State Fullerton	W 72–69	18–9 (14–4)	Crawford Hall (1,467); Irvine, CA
PCAA tournament
March 8, 1984		vs. Long Beach State; Quarterfinals	W 77–65	19–9	The Forum (11,791); Inglewood, CA
March 9, 1984		vs. Fresno State; Semifinals	L 57–71	19–10	The Forum (13,951); Inglewood, CA
*Non-conference game. ^{#}Rankings from AP Poll. (#) Tournament seedings in parentheses. All times are in Pacific Time.

== Awards and honors ==
- Ben McDonald
  - AP Honorable Mention All-American
  - PCAA First Team All-Conference
- George Turner
  - PCAA All-Freshman Team
