= 1987 West Coast Athletic Conference men's basketball tournament =

- Classification: Division I
- Season: 1986–87
- Teams: 8
- Site: War Memorial Gymnasium; San Francisco, CA
- Champions: Santa Clara (1st title)
- Winning coach: Carroll Williams (1st title)
- MVP: Jens Gordon (Santa Clara)
- West Coast Athletic Conference men's basketball tournaments

1986–87 West Coast Athletic Conference men's basketball standings
	Conf.				Overall
Team	W		L	PCT	W		L	PCT
San Diego	13	–	1	.929	24	–	6	.800
Gonzaga	9	–	5	.643	18	–	10	.643
Saint Mary's	7	–	7	.500	17	–	13	.567
Portland	6	–	8	.429	14	–	14	.500
Santa Clara †	6	–	8	.429	18	–	14	.563
San Francisco	6	–	8	.429	16	–	12	.571
Pepperdine	5	–	9	.357	12	–	18	.400
Loyola Marymount	4	–	10	.286	12	–	16	.429
† Conference tournament winner Rankings from AP poll

The 1987 West Coast Athletic Conference men's basketball tournament (now West Coast Conference) was held from February 28 to March 7, with the semifinals and finals at the War Memorial Gymnasium at the University of San Francisco in San Francisco, California. This was the first edition of the conference tournament and included all eight teams.

The first round quarterfinals were held on the home courts of the top four seeds, and two of the hosts were defeated. In the semifinals on a neutral court in San Francisco, the lower seeds won both semifinals; both had losing conference records.

Fifth-seeded Santa Clara defeated #7 Pepperdine in the championship game 77–65 to gain the automatic bid to the 64-team NCAA tournament, and were seeded fifteenth in the West regional. Regular season champion San Diego, upset by a point in the conference semifinals, received an at-large bid and were the ninth seed in the Midwest regional; both WCAC teams lost in the first round.

== Bracket ==
Quarterfinals; Saturday, February 28; Sunday, March 1 (four sites)
1	San Diego *	99
8	Loyola Marymount	84
5	Santa Clara	91
4	Portland *	60
(Pairings are reseeded after the first round)
3	Saint Mary's *	62
6	San Francisco	57
7	Pepperdine	76
2	Gonzaga *	73

Semifinals; Friday, March 6 San Francisco
1	San Diego	63
7	Pepperdine	64
3	Saint Mary's	50
5	Santa Clara	55

Championship; Saturday, March 7 San Francisco
7	Pepperdine	65
5	Santa Clara	77

* denotes host team
