= 1983–84 UNLV Runnin' Rebels basketball team =

American college basketball season

1983–84 UNLV Runnin' Rebels basketball

PCAA regular season champions

NCAA men's Division I tournament, Sweet Sixteen
- Conference: Pacific Coast Athletic Association

Ranking
- Coaches: No. 13
- AP: No. 13
- Record: 29–6 (16–2 PCAA)
- Head coach: Jerry Tarkanian (11th season)
- Assistant coaches: Tim Grgurich; Mark Warkentien; Ralph Readout
- Home arena: Thomas & Mack Center

1983–84 Pacific Coast Athletic Association men's basketball standings
	Conf.				Overall
Team	W		L	PCT	W		L	PCT
No. 13 UNLV	16	–	2	.889	29	–	6	.829
UC Irvine	14	–	4	.778	19	–	10	.655
Fresno State†	13	–	5	.722	25	–	8	.758
Utah State	12	–	6	.667	19	–	11	.633
New Mexico State	9	–	9	.500	13	–	15	.464
Cal State Fullerton	8	–	10	.444	17	–	13	.567
San Jose State	6	–	12	.333	10	–	18	.357
Long Beach State	6	–	12	.333	9	–	19	.321
UC Santa Barbara	5	–	13	.278	10	–	17	.370
Pacific	1	–	17	.056	3	–	27	.100
† 1984 PCAA tournament winner

The 1983–84 UNLV Runnin' Rebels basketball team represented the University of Nevada Las Vegas in NCAA Division I men's competition in the 1983–84 season under head coach Jerry Tarkanian. The team played its home games in the Thomas & Mack Center, and was a member of the Pacific Coast Athletic Association (PCAA), now known as the Big West Conference. The Rebels won the regular season conference title, but fell to Fresno State in the championship game of the PCAA Tournament. The team finished with a record of 29–6 (16–2 PCAA).

== Roster ==
1983–84 UNLV Runnin' Rebels men's basketball team
Players
Coaches

Pos.	#	Name	Height	Weight	Year	Hometown
G	13	Freddie Banks	6 ft 2 in (1.88 m)	155 lb (70 kg)	Fr	Las Vegas, Nevada
G	14	Danny Tarkanian	6 ft 2 in (1.88 m)	190 lb (86 kg)	Sr	Las Vegas, Nevada
F	20	Ed Catchings	6 ft 7 in (2.01 m)	205 lb (93 kg)	Jr
C	31	Richie Adams	6 ft 9 in (2.06 m)	215 lb (98 kg)	Jr	Harlem, New York

Head coach

- Jerry Tarkanian (Fresno State)

Assistant coach(es)

- Tim Grgurich (Pittsburgh)
- Mark Warkentien (Cal State Fullerton)
- Ralph Readout (Ohio)

Legend

- (C) Team captain
- (S) Suspended
- (I) Ineligible
- (W) Walk-on
- Injured
- Current redshirt

Roster

== Schedule and results ==
Date time, TV	Rank^{#}	Opponent^{#}	Result	Record	Site (attendance) city, state
Regular season
Nov 26, 1983*		Nevada	W 92–71	1–0	Thomas & Mack Center (15,227); Las Vegas, Nevada
Dec 5, 1983*		at Hawaii Pacific	W 107–58	2–0	(800); Honolulu, Hawaii
Dec 7, 1983*		at Hawaii	W 90–87	3–0	Neal S. Blaisdell Center (1,640); Honolulu, Hawaii
Dec 10, 1983*		West Virginia	W 86–72	4–0	Thomas & Mack Center (15,876); Las Vegas, Nevada
Dec 13, 1983*		at Nevada	W 74–69	5–0	Lawlor Events Center (5,465); Reno, Nevada
Dec 17, 1983*		Kansas State	W 84–78	6–0	Thomas & Mack Center (15,659); Las Vegas, Nevada
Dec 22, 1983*		SMU; Las Vegas Rebel Roundup	W 74–64	7–0	Thomas & Mack Center (14,885); Las Vegas, Nevada
Dec 23, 1983*		Southern Illinois; Las Vegas Rebel Roundup	W 91–68	8–0	Thomas & Mack Center (14,900); Las Vegas, Nevada
Dec 27, 1983*		Clemson; Las Vegas Classic	W 69–55	9–0	Thomas & Mack Center (16,465); Las Vegas, Nevada
Dec 30, 1983*		No. 5 Georgetown; Las Vegas Classic	L 67–69 ^{OT}	9–1	Thomas & Mack Center (18,500); Las Vegas, Nevada
Jan 5, 1984	No. 18	Long Beach State	W 103–66	10–1 (1–0)	Thomas & Mack Center (15,525); Las Vegas, Nevada
Jan 7, 1984	No. 18	New Mexico State	W 87–66	11–1 (2–0)	Thomas & Mack Center (14,553); Las Vegas, Nevada
Jan 9, 1984	No. 14	UC Irvine	W 83–68	12–1 (3–0)	Thomas & Mack Center (14,500); Las Vegas, Nevada
Jan 12, 1984	No. 14	at San Jose State	W 105–77	13–1 (4–0)	San Jose Civic Auditorium (2,412); San Jose, California
Jan 14, 1984	No. 14	at Utah State	W 93–88	14–1 (5–0)	Dee Glen Smith Spectrum (10,326); Logan, Utah
Jan 19, 1984	No. 8	Pacific	W 117–78	15–1 (6–0)	Thomas & Mack Center (14,325); Las Vegas, Nevada
Jan 21, 1984	No. 8	No. 17 Fresno State	W 64–62	16–1 (7–0)	Thomas & Mack Center (18,500); Las Vegas, Nevada
Jan 26, 1984	No. 6	at UC Santa Barbara	W 100–68	17–1 (8–0)	The Thunderdome (4,327); Santa Barbara, California
Jan 28, 1984	No. 6	at Cal State Fullerton	W 82–75	18–1 (9–0)	Titan Gym (4,226); Fullerton, California
Feb 2, 1984	No. 5	at New Mexico State	W 89–81	19–1 (10–0)	Pan American Center (12,752); Las Cruces, New Mexico
Feb 4, 1984	No. 5	at Long Beach State	W 79–65	20–1 (11–0)	Long Beach Arena (4,165); Long Beach, California
Feb 9, 1984	No. 4	Utah State	W 97–75	21–1 (12–0)	Thomas & Mack Center (17,200); Las Vegas, Nevada
Feb 12, 1984	No. 4	San Jose State	W 86–76	22–1 (13–0)	Thomas & Mack Center (14,300); Las Vegas, Nevada
Feb 16, 1984	No. 5	at Pacific	W 92–52	23–1 (14–0)	Alex G. Spanos Center (4,773); Stockton, California
Feb 19, 1984	No. 5	at Fresno State	L 43–68	23–2 (14–1)	Selland Arena (6,582); Fresno, California
Feb 23, 1984	No. 7	Cal State Fullerton	W 74–62	24–2 (15–1)	Thomas & Mack Center (17,400); Las Vegas, Nevada
Feb 25, 1984	No. 7	UC Santa Barbara	W 97–69	25–2 (16–1)	Thomas & Mack Center (14,650); Las Vegas, Nevada
Mar 1, 1984	No. 7	at UC Irvine	L 74–77	25–3 (16–2)	Crawford Hall (1,467); Irvine, California
Mar 3, 1984*	No. 7	at No. 6 Oklahoma	L 70–78	25–4	Lloyd Noble Center (11,524); Norman, Oklahoma
PCAA tournament
Mar 8, 1984*	(1) No. 10	vs. San Jose State; Quarterfinals	W 70–55	26–4	The Forum (10,791); Inglewood, California
Mar 9, 1984*	(1) No. 10	vs. Utah State; Semifinals	W 91–78	27–4	The Forum (13,951); Inglewood, California
Mar 10, 1984*	(1) No. 10	vs. Fresno State; Championship Game	L 49–51	27–5	The Forum (13,816); Inglewood, California
NCAA tournament
Mar 15, 1984*	(5 W) No. 13	vs. Princeton	W 68–56	28–5	Jon M. Huntsman Center (6,978); Salt Lake City, Utah
Mar 17, 1984*	(5 W) No. 13	vs. (4 W) No. 9 UTEP	W 73–60	29–5	Jon M. Huntsman Center (8,110); Salt Lake City, Utah
Mar 23, 1984*; 9:10 p.m., CBS	(5 W) No. 13	vs. (1 W) No. 2 Georgetown; West Regional semifinal – Sweet Sixteen	L 48–62	29–6	Pauley Pavilion (12,542); Los Angeles, California
*Non-conference game. ^{#}Rankings from AP poll. (#) Tournament seedings in parentheses. W=West. All times are in Pacific Time.

== Rankings ==
Ranking movements Legend: ██ Increase in ranking ██ Decrease in ranking — = Not ranked
	Week																
Poll	Pre	1	2	3	4	5	6	7	8	9	10	11	12	13	14	15	Final
AP	—	—	—	—	—	—	18	14	8	6	5	4	5	7	7	10	13
Coaches	Not released		—	—	—	—	18	12	8	9	6	5	5	7	6	10	13

== Awards and honors ==
- Richie Adams – PCAA Player of the Year

== See also ==
- UNLV Runnin' Rebels basketball
- 1984 NCAA Division I men's basketball tournament
