= Stan Washington =

American basketball player (born 1952)

Personal information
- Born: January 23, 1952 (age 74) Washington, D.C., U.S.
- Listed height: 6 ft 4 in (1.93 m)
- Listed weight: 190 lb (86 kg)

Career information
- High school: Spingarn (Washington, D.C.)
- College: San Diego (1971–1974)
- NBA draft: 1974: 4th round, 66th overall pick
- Drafted by: Capital Bullets
- Playing career: 1970–1974
- Position: Point guard
- Number: 20

Career history
- 1970–1971: Camden Bullets
- 1974: Washington Bullets
- Stats at NBA.com
- Stats at Basketball Reference

Stanley Washington (born January 23, 1952) is an American former professional basketball player for the Washington Bullets of the National Basketball Association (NBA). He played college basketball for the San Diego Toreros, and left as the school's career scoring leader with 1,472 points, a record that stood for 34 years until it was broken by Gyno Pomare in 2008. Washington's career total of 451 assists was also a Toreros record until 1996, when it was broken by David Fizdale.

Washington played high school ball in Washington, D.C., where he was recruited by Marquette, Detroit and Loyola Chicago. He instead chose to attend the University of San Diego (USD), believing that he could contribute more as a guard at a small-college school, which did not depend as much on big, dominant centers. Wanting to improve his skills to play professionally, he also thought that a large school would only value his shooting and not allow him to improve on defense. At the time, USD was an NCAA Division II affiliate. Washington played on the freshman team and then three years of varsity under Toreros coach Bernie Bickerstaff. As a senior in 1974, he broke the school career scoring record of 1,234 set by Russ Cravens over four seasons (1959–1963).

After college, Washington was selected by the Washington Bullets in the fourth round of the 1974 NBA draft with the 66th overall pick (the franchise changed its name from the Capital Bullets prior to the start of the 1974–75 season). He was reunited with Bickerstaff, who had left USD to become an assistant coach for the Bullets in 1973–74. Washington appeared in one regular season game for the Bullets on October 19, 1974, when he was scoreless in four minutes while attempting one shot. Four days later, he was released by the team so that they could sign Jimmy Jones, who had been a seven-year veteran and All-Star in the rival American Basketball Association (ABA). After a few tryouts with ABA teams later that season, Washington retired from basketball.

Washington appeared in three games with the Camden Bullets of the Eastern Basketball Association (EBA) during the 1970–71 season.

Washington is the only Torero to have played in the NBA. He was inducted into USD's athletics hall of fame in 2010.

== Career statistics ==
Legend
GP	Games played	GS	Games started	MPG	Minutes per game
FG%	Field goal percentage	3P%	3-point field goal percentage	FT%	Free throw percentage
RPG	Rebounds per game	APG	Assists per game	SPG	Steals per game
BPG	Blocks per game	PPG	Points per game	**Bold**	Career high

=== NBA ===
==== Regular season ====
Year	Team	GP	MPG	FG%	FT%	RPG	APG	SPG	BPG	PPG
1974–75	Washington	1	4.0	.000	–	.0	.0	.0	.0	.0
