= 1986–87 Santa Clara Broncos men's basketball team =

American college basketball season

1986–87 Santa Clara Broncos men's basketball

WCAC tournament champions

NCAA tournament, first round
- Conference: West Coast Athletic Conference
- Record: 18–14 (6–8 WCAC)
- Head coach: Carroll Williams (17th season)
- Home arena: Toso Pavilion

1986–87 West Coast Athletic Conference men's basketball standings
	Conf.				Overall
Team	W		L	PCT	W		L	PCT
San Diego	13	–	1	.929	24	–	6	.800
Gonzaga	9	–	5	.643	18	–	10	.643
Saint Mary's	7	–	7	.500	17	–	13	.567
Portland	6	–	8	.429	14	–	14	.500
Santa Clara †	6	–	8	.429	18	–	14	.563
San Francisco	6	–	8	.429	16	–	12	.571
Pepperdine	5	–	9	.357	12	–	18	.400
Loyola Marymount	4	–	10	.286	12	–	16	.429
† Conference tournament winner Rankings from AP poll

The 1986–87 Santa Clara Broncos men's basketball team represented Santa Clara University as a member of the West Coast Athletic Conference during the 1986-87 Season. Led by head coach Carroll Williams, the Broncos finished with a record of 18–14, and a WCC record of 6–8. The Broncos beat Portland, Saint Mary's, and Pepperdine to win the West Coast Athletic Conference tournament, and received an automatic bid into the NCAA tournament. Santa Clara was beaten by No. 2 seed Iowa in the opening round.

== Roster ==
1986–87 Santa Clara Broncos men's basketball team
Players	Coaches
Pos. / # / Name / Height / Weight / Year / Previous school / Hometown; F / / Jens Gordon / 6 ft 9 in (2.06 m) / — / So	Head coach: Carroll Williams; Assistant coach(es) Legend: (C) Team captain; (S) Suspended; (I) Ineligible; (W) Walk-on; Injured; Current redshirt

== Schedule and results ==
Date time, TV	Rank^{#}	Opponent^{#}	Result	Record	Site city, state
Regular season
Nov 29, 1986*		at UCLA	L 62–76	1–1	Pauley Pavilion; Los Angeles, California
WCAC Tournament
Mar 1, 1987*	(5)	at (4) Portland; Quarterfinals	W 91–60	16–13	Chiles Center; Portland, Oregon
Mar 6, 1987*	(5)	vs. (3) Saint Mary's; Semifinals	W 55–50	17–13	War Memorial Gymnasium; San Francisco, California
Mar 7, 1987*	(5)	vs. (7) Pepperdine; Championship game	W 77–65	18–13	War Memorial Gymnasium; San Francisco, California
NCAA Tournament
Mar 13, 1987*	(15 W)	vs. (2 W) No. 6 Iowa; First round	L 76–99	18–14	McKale Center; Tucson, Arizona
*Non-conference game. ^{#}Rankings from AP Poll. (#) Tournament seedings in parentheses. W=West.
