= 1986–87 Gonzaga Bulldogs men's basketball team =

American college basketball season

1986–87 Gonzaga Bulldogs men's basketball
- Conference: West Coast Athletic Conference
- Record: 18–10 (9–5 WCAC)
- Head coach: Dan Fitzgerald (5th season)
- Home arena: Martin Centre

1986–87 West Coast Athletic Conference men's basketball standings
	Conf.				Overall
Team	W		L	PCT	W		L	PCT
San Diego	13	–	1	.929	24	–	6	.800
Gonzaga	9	–	5	.643	18	–	10	.643
Saint Mary's	7	–	7	.500	17	–	13	.567
Portland	6	–	8	.429	14	–	14	.500
Santa Clara †	6	–	8	.429	18	–	14	.563
San Francisco	6	–	8	.429	16	–	12	.571
Pepperdine	5	–	9	.357	12	–	18	.400
Loyola Marymount	4	–	10	.286	12	–	16	.429
† Conference tournament winner Rankings from AP poll

The 1986–87 Gonzaga Bulldogs men's basketball team represented Gonzaga University in the West Coast Athletic Conference (WCAC) during the 1986–87 NCAA Division I men's basketball season. Led by fifth-year head coach Dan Fitzgerald, the Bulldogs were 18–9 (.667) overall in the regular season (9–5 in WCAC, 2nd), and played their home games on campus at the newly renamed Charlotte Y. Martin Centre (formerly Kennedy Pavilion) in Spokane, Washington.

After four years away from the bench, athletic director Fitzgerald had resumed his former role as head coach the previous season.

The conference tournament made its debut this year; the Zags were upset at home by seventh-seeded Pepperdine in the quarterfinals to finish at 18–10 (.643). Their first tournament wins came five years later in 1992 when they advanced to the final, but fell by three to the top-seeded Waves.

Gonzaga's previous postseason appearance was a decade earlier, in the four-team tournament of the Big Sky Conference.

== Postseason results ==
Date time, TV	Rank^{#}	Opponent^{#}	Result	Record	Site (attendance) city, state
WCAC tournament
Sat, Feb 28; 7:30 pm	(2)	(7) Pepperdine; Quarterfinal	L 73–76	18–10	Martin Centre; Spokane, Washington
*Non-conference game. ^{#}Rankings from AP poll. (#) Tournament seedings in parentheses. All times are in Pacific time.
