= 1984 Pacific Coast Athletic Association men's basketball tournament =

- Classification: Division I
- Season: 1983–84
- Teams: 8
- Site: The Forum; Inglewood, CA
- Champions: Fresno State (3rd title)
- Winning coach: Boyd Grant (3rd title)
- MVP: Richie Adams (UNLV)
- Pacific Coast Athletic Association men's basketball tournaments

1983–84 Pacific Coast Athletic Association men's basketball standings
	Conf.				Overall
Team	W		L	PCT	W		L	PCT
No. 13 UNLV	16	–	2	.889	29	–	6	.829
UC Irvine	14	–	4	.778	19	–	10	.655
Fresno State†	13	–	5	.722	25	–	8	.758
Utah State	12	–	6	.667	19	–	11	.633
New Mexico State	9	–	9	.500	13	–	15	.464
Cal State Fullerton	8	–	10	.444	17	–	13	.567
San Jose State	6	–	12	.333	10	–	18	.357
Long Beach State	6	–	12	.333	9	–	19	.321
UC Santa Barbara	5	–	13	.278	10	–	17	.370
Pacific	1	–	17	.056	3	–	27	.100
† 1984 PCAA tournament winner

The 1984 Pacific Coast Athletic Association men's basketball tournament (now known as the Big West Conference men's basketball tournament) was held March 8–10 at The Forum in Inglewood, California.

Third-seeded Fresno State upset top-seeded, defending champions UNLV in the final, 51–49, thus capturing their third PCAA/Big West title (and third in four seasons).

The Bulldogs, in turn, received a bid to the 1984 NCAA tournament, the program's third overall. UNLV, PCAA tournament runners-up, were also included in the NCAA field.

== Format ==
The tournament field remained the same as 1983, with eight total teams, despite the addition of one new team (New Mexico State, from the Missouri Valley) to the PCAA. Instead, only the top eight teams, out of ten, from the regular season standings qualified for the conference tournament.

All eight teams were placed into the first round, with teams seeded and paired based on regular-season records. After the first round, teams were re-seeded so the highest-remaining team was paired with the lowest-remaining time in one semifinal with the other two teams slotted into the other semifinal.

== Bracket ==
First round Thursday, March 8
1	#10 UNLV	70
8	San José State	55
5	New Mexico State	77
4	Utah State	79
(Pairings are reseeded after the first round)
3	Fresno State	53
6	Cal State Fullerton	51
7	Long Beach State	65
2	UC Irvine	72

Semifinals; Friday, March 9
1	#10 UNLV	91
4	Utah State	78
3	Fresno State	71
2	UC Irvine	57

Championship; Saturday, March 10
1	#10 UNLV	49
3	Fresno State	51
