= 1983–84 Princeton Tigers men's basketball team =

American college basketball season

1983–84 Princeton Tigers men's basketball

Ivy League Champion

1984 NCAA Division I men's basketball tournament, First round
- Conference: Ivy League
- Record: 18–10 (10–4, 1st Ivy)
- Head coach: Pete Carril (17th season)
- Captain: Bill Ryan
- Home arena: Jadwin Gymnasium

1983–84 Ivy League men's basketball standings
	Conf.				Overall
Team	W		L	PCT	W		L	PCT
Princeton	10	–	4	.714	18	–	10	.643
Cornell	9	–	5	.643	16	–	10	.615
Harvard	9	–	5	.643	15	–	11	.577
Penn	7	–	7	.500	10	–	16	.385
Brown	6	–	8	.429	11	–	15	.423
Dartmouth	6	–	8	.429	11	–	15	.423
Columbia	5	–	9	.357	8	–	18	.308
Yale	4	–	10	.286	7	–	19	.269
Rankings from AP Poll

The 1983–84 Princeton Tigers men's basketball team represented Princeton University in intercollegiate college basketball during the 1983–84 NCAA Division I men's basketball season. The head coach was Pete Carril and the team captains was Bill Ryan. The team played its home games in the Jadwin Gymnasium on the University campus in Princeton, New Jersey. The team was the champion of the Ivy League, which earned it an invitation to the 53-team 1984 NCAA Division I men's basketball tournament.

The team posted an 18–10 overall record and a 10–4 conference record. During the season, the team faced NCAA basketball tournament entrants Northeastern and eventual champion Houston in December tournaments. In a 1984 NCAA Division I men's basketball tournament preliminary round game on March 13 at The Palestra in Philadelphia, Pennsylvania, the team defeated San Diego Toreros 65–56. Then, in the March 15 West Regional first-round game at the Huntsman Center in Salt Lake City, Utah against the UNLV Runnin' Rebels, it lost by a 68–56 margin.

The team was led by first team All-Ivy League selections Kevin Mullin and Bill Ryan. That season, Ryan led the Ivy League in assists for the second time. Mullin was drafted by the Boston Celtics in the 1984 NBA draft with the 93rd overall selection in the fourth round, while Ryan was selected by the New Jersey Nets with the 200th selection in the ninth round.

The team was the national statistical champion in scoring defense with an average of 52.0 points allowed.

== Schedule and results ==
The team posted a 18–10 (10–4 Ivy League) record.

Date time, TV	Rank^{#}	Opponent^{#}	Result	Record	Site city, state
Regular season
Nov 26, 1983*		Bucknell	L 58–60	0–1	Jadwin Gymnasium; Princeton, New Jersey
Nov 29, 1983*		Rutgers	W 52–40	1–1	Jadwin Gymnasium; Princeton, New Jersey
Dec 3, 1983*		Lafayette	W 56–38	2–1	Jadwin Gymnasium; Princeton, New Jersey
Dec 10, 1983*		Delaware	W 68–44	3–1	Jadwin Gymnasium; Princeton, New Jersey
Dec 16, 1983*		vs. Santa Clara; Christmas Kettle Classic	W 75–53	4–1	Hofheinz Pavilion; Houston, Texas
Dec 17, 1983*		at No. 3 Houston; Christmas Kettle Classic	L 40–65	4–2	Hofheinz Pavilion; Houston, Texas
Dec 28, 1983*		vs. Northeastern; Rochester Classic	L 34–55	4–3	Rochester, New York
Dec 29, 1983*		vs. American; Rochester Classic	W 71–36	5–3	Rochester, New York
Jan 3, 1984*		Lehigh	W 49–47	6–3	Jadwin Gymnasium; Princeton, New Jersey
Jan 6, 1984		at Harvard	L 50–52	6–4 (0–1)	Lavietes Pavilion; Cambridge, Massachusetts
Jan 7, 1984		at Dartmouth	L 46–47	6–5 (0–2)	Alumni Gym; Hanover, New Hampshire
Jan 10, 1984*		Hartford	W 80–66	7–5	Jadwin Gymnasium; Princeton, New Jersey
Jan 25, 1984*		at No. 2 DePaul	L 39–50	7–6	Rosemont Horizon; Rosemont, Illinois
Jan 28, 1984		at Penn	W 63–51	8–6 (1–2)	The Palestra; Philadelphia, Pennsylvania
Feb 3, 1984		at Yale	W 62–60	9–6 (2–2)	Payne Whitney Gymnasium; New Haven, Connecticut
Feb 4, 1984		at Brown	W 66–52	10–6 (3–2)	Marvel Gymnasium; Providence, Rhode Island
Feb 10, 1984		Columbia	W 34–28	11–6 (4–2)	Jadwin Gymnasium; Princeton, New Jersey
Feb 11, 1984		Cornell	W 63–43	12–6 (5–2)	Jadwin Gymnasium; Princeton, New Jersey
Feb 14, 1984		Penn	W 45–41	13–6 (6–2)	Jadwin Gymnasium; Princeton, New Jersey
Feb 17, 1984		Dartmouth	W 61–49	14–6 (7–2)	Jadwin Gymnasium; Princeton, New Jersey
Feb 18, 1984		Harvard	L 50–55	14–7 (7–3)	Jadwin Gymnasium; Princeton, New Jersey
Feb 22, 1984*		New Hampshire	L 45–58	14–8	Jadwin Gymnasium; Princeton, New Jersey
Feb 24, 1984		at Cornell	L 31–33	14–9 (7–4)	Barton Hall; Ithaca, New York
Feb 25, 1984		at Columbia	W 75–51	15–9 (8–4)	Levien Gymnasium; New York, New York
Mar 2, 1984		Brown	W 65–57	16–9 (9–4)	Jadwin Gymnasium; Princeton, New Jersey
Mar 3, 1984		Yale	W 61–48	17–9 (10–4)	Jadwin Gymnasium; Princeton, New Jersey
NCAA tournament
Mar 13, 1984*	(12 W)	vs. (12 W) San Diego; Preliminary round	W 65–56	18–9	The Palestra; Philadelphia, Pennsylvania
Mar 15, 1984*	(12 W)	vs. (5 W) No. 13 UNLV; First round	L 56–68	18–10	Jon M. Huntsman Center; Salt Lake City, Utah
*Non-conference game. ^{#}Rankings from AP Poll. (#) Tournament seedings in parentheses. W=West.
