= 1983–84 Nevada Wolf Pack men's basketball team =

American college basketball season

1983–84 Nevada Wolf Pack men's basketball

Big Sky tournament champion

NCAA tournament
- Conference: Big Sky Conference
- Record: 17–14 (7–7 Big Sky)
- Head coach: Sonny Allen (2nd season)
- Home arena: Lawlor Events Center

1983–84 Big Sky men's basketball standings
	Conf.				Overall
Team	W		L	PCT	W		L	PCT
Weber State	12	–	2	.857	23	–	8	.742
Montana	9	–	5	.643	23	–	7	.767
Montana State	7	–	7	.500	14	–	15	.483
Nevada †	7	–	7	.500	17	–	14	.548
Idaho State	6	–	8	.429	12	–	19	.387
Boise State	6	–	8	.429	15	–	12	.556
Northern Arizona	5	–	9	.357	13	–	14	.481
Idaho	4	–	10	.286	9	–	19	.321
† 1984 Big Sky tournament winner

The 1983–84 Nevada Wolf Pack men's basketball team represented the University of Nevada, Reno during the 1983–84 NCAA Division I men's basketball season. The Wolf Pack, led by second year head coach Sonny Allen, played their home games at the new Lawlor Events Center on their campus in Reno, Nevada as members of the Big Sky Conference.

After finishing third in the conference regular season standings, Nevada won the Big Sky tournament to receive an automatic bid to the NCAA tournament as No. 11 seed in the West Region. The Wolf Pack was beaten by No. 6 seed Washington in the opening round, 64–54. The team finished with a record of 17–14 (7–7 Big Sky).

== Roster ==
1983–84 Nevada Wolf Pack men's basketball team
Players	Coaches
Pos. / # / Name / Height / Weight / Year / Hometown; G / / Curtis High / 6 ft 0 in (1.83 m) / — / Jr	Head coach: Sonny Allen (Marshall); Assistant coach(es) Legend: (C) Team captain; (S) Suspended; (I) Ineligible; (W) Walk-on; Injured; Current redshirt; Roster

== Schedule and results ==
Date time, TV	Rank^{#}	Opponent^{#}	Result	Record	Site city, state
Regular season
Nov 26, 1983*		at UNLV	L 71–92	0–1	Thomas & Mack Center; Las Vegas, Nevada
Nov 29, 1983*		Portland	L 75–76	0–2	Lawlor Events Center; Reno, Nevada
Dec 3, 1983*		Utah	L 90–102	0–3	Lawlor Events Center; Reno, Nevada
Dec 6, 1983*		at Saint Mary's	L 61–87	0–4	McKeon Pavilion; Moraga, California
Dec 7, 1983*		at California	W 57–54	1–4	Harmon Gym; Berkeley, California
Dec 13, 1983*		UNLV	L 69–74	1–5	Lawlor Events Center; Reno, Nevada
Dec 15, 1983*		Southern Oregon	W 94–82	2–5	Lawlor Events Center; Reno, Nevada
Dec 17, 1983*		San Jose State	W 79–75	3–5	Lawlor Events Center; Reno, Nevada
Dec 20, 1983*		at Pepperdine	W 78–77	4–5	Firestone Fieldhouse; Malibu, California
Dec 28, 1983*		UC Davis; Wolf Pack Classic	W 81–64	5–5	Lawlor Events Center; Reno, Nevada
Dec 29, 1983*		San Diego; Wolf Pack Classic	W 70–66	6–5	Lawlor Events Center; Reno, Nevada
Jan 3, 1984*		Regis College	W 72–70	7–5	Lawlor Events Center; Reno, Nevada
Jan 7, 1984*		Santa Clara	L 66–76	7–6	Lawlor Events Center; Reno, Nevada
Jan 12, 1984		at Weber State	L 62–80	7–7 (0–1)	Dee Events Center; Ogden, Utah
Jan 14, 1984		at Idaho State	L 60–69	7–8 (0–2)	Holt Arena; Pocatello, Idaho
Jan 19, 1984		Montana	W 61–59	8–8 (1–2)	Lawlor Events Center; Reno, Nevada
Jan 21, 1984		Montana State	L 59–63	8–9 (1–3)	Lawlor Events Center; Reno, Nevada
Jan 26, 1984		at Boise State	L 69–81	8–10 (1–4)	BSU Pavilion; Boise, Idaho
Jan 28, 1984		at Idaho	W 83–70	9–10 (2–4)	Cowan Spectrum; Moscow, Idaho
Feb 4, 1984		at Northern Arizona	W 69–57	10–10 (3–4)	Walkup Skydome; Flagstaff, Arizona
Feb 9, 1984		Idaho State	W 76–49	11–10 (4–4)	Lawlor Events Center; Reno, Nevada
Feb 11, 1984		Weber State	L 56–62	11–11 (4–5)	Lawlor Events Center; Reno, Nevada
Feb 16, 1984		at Montana State	L 73–90	11–12 (4–6)	Worthington Arena; Havre, Montana
Feb 18, 1984		at Montana	L 62–79	11–13 (4–7)	Dahlberg Arena; Missoula, Montana
Feb 23, 1984		Idaho	W 74–67	12–13 (5–7)	Lawlor Events Center; Reno, Nevada
Feb 25, 1984		Boise State	W 52–50	13–13 (6–7)	Lawlor Events Center; Reno, Nevada
Mar 3, 1984		Northern Arizona	W 85–65	14–13 (7–7)	Lawlor Events Center; Reno, Nevada
Big Sky tournament
Mar 8, 1984*		Idaho State; Quarterfinals	W 64–59	15–13	Lawlor Events Center; Reno, Nevada
Mar 9, 1984*		at Weber State; Semifinals	W 85–68	16–13	Dee Events Center; Ogden, Utah
Mar 10, 1984*		vs. Montana; Championship game	W 71–69	17–13	Dee Events Center; Ogden, Utah
NCAA tournament
Mar 16, 1984*		vs. No. 15 Washington; First round	L 54–64	17–14	Beasley Coliseum (6,500); Pullman, Washington
*Non-conference game. (#) Tournament seedings in parentheses. W=West. All times are in Pacific Time.
