= Bill Trumbo =

American basketball player, coach, and athletics director

Biographical details
- Born: September 17, 1939; LaRue County, Kentucky, U.S.
- Died: October 28, 2018 (aged 79); Kona, Hawaii, U.S.

Playing career
- 1957–1961: Chapman
- Positions: Forward - (basketball); Catcher - (baseball)

Coaching career (HC unless noted)
- 1961–1962: Chapman (asst.)
- 1962–1966: Garden Grove HS
- 1966–1970: Culver–Stockton
- 1972–1974: Sonoma State
- 1974–1983: Santa Rosa JC
- 1983–1986: Idaho
- 198x: Kenyan national team
- 1989–1990: Santa Barbara CC
- 2003–2006: Cal State–Monterey Bay

Administrative career (AD unless noted)
- 1966–1970: Culver–Stockton
- 1970–1974: Sonoma State
- 1990–2000: Hawaii–Hilo
- 2000–2006: Cal State–Monterey Bay
- 2008–2009: Diablo Valley (interim)
- 2009–2016: Konawaena HS

William Roy Trumbo (September 17, 1939 – October 28, 2018) was an American college basketball coach and athletics director in the western United States, primarily in California and Hawaii, and coached at the Division I level for three seasons at Idaho. His first collegiate head coaching position was at Culver–Stockton College in Missouri.

== Early years ==
Born in LaRue County, Kentucky, Trumbo attended Chapman College in Orange, California, and was a two-sport athlete for four years: a forward in basketball and a catcher on the baseball team from 1957 to 1961. He was team captain and student body president.

== Coaching career ==
Following graduation from Chapman in 1961, Trumbo was an assistant coach at his alma mater for a year, then became the head coach at nearby Garden Grove High School in 1962 for four years. In 1966, he became a college head coach and athletic director at Culver–Stockton College, an NAIA program in Canton, Missouri.

Trumbo moved back west to northern California in 1970 to Sonoma State in Rohnert Park as athletic director, and added basketball coaching duties after the Cossacks went 3–24 in 1972, winless in a dozen conference games. Under Trumbo, Sonoma State was 16–8 overall in 1973 with ten conference wins, and went 18–10 the following season. The basketball program was dropped in 1974 for financial reasons and Trumbo departed for nearby Santa Rosa Junior College and was the head coach for nine seasons, posting a 212–68 (.757) record with seven conference titles.

=== Idaho ===
Moving up to Division I, Trumbo was hired at resurgent Idaho in April 1983, replacing Don Monson, a charismatic alumnus from Coeur d'Alene who departed after five seasons for Oregon in the Pac-10 Conference. The Vandals had been a last place team in the Big Sky Conference for five straight seasons in the late 1970s, but rose to second in 1980 and then won consecutive conference titles (regular season and tournament) in 1981 and 1982. The latter finished the regular season at 24–2 with a #6 ranking in both national polls, and advanced to the Sweet Sixteen in the NCAA tournament. The 1983 team slipped back slightly, but was 20–7 in the regular season and was invited to the NIT, a first for the Big Sky. In Monson's last four seasons, the best stretch in program history, Idaho was 54–2 (.964) at home, with a 43-game home winning streak; attendance had twice topped 11,000 in the Kibbie Dome during the 1983 season.

As an outsider following a hero, Trumbo recognized that his task in Moscow to continue the recent success would be difficult; with less talent and experience, Idaho slipped back into the Big Sky cellar in 1984 and attendance plummeted. His teams went 27–59 (.314) overall (9–33 (.214) in conference) and he was relieved of his duties after three seasons in March 1986, succeeded by Tim Floyd, an assistant under hall of fame head coach Don Haskins at Texas-El Paso.

== Later career ==
Returning to lower profile programs, Trumbo was later the athletic director at Hawaii–Hilo (1990–2000), Cal State–Monterey Bay (2000–2006), Diablo Valley College (interim, 2008–2009), and back on Hawaii (Big Island) at Konawaena High School from 2009 to 2016. At Monterey Bay, he was also the basketball coach for his final three years there.

Trumbo died in Kona at age 79 in 2018 from complications of Alzheimer's disease.

== Head coaching record ==
=== College ===
Record table
Season	Team	Overall	Conference	Standing	Postseason
Idaho Vandals (Big Sky Conference) (1983–1986)
1983–84	Idaho	9–19	4–10	8th	
1984–85	Idaho	8–22	1–13	8th	
1985–86	Idaho	10–18	4–10	8th	
Idaho:		27–59 (.314)	9–33 (.214)		
Total:		27–59			
