= 1983–84 UCLA Bruins men's basketball team =

American college basketball season

1983–84 UCLA Bruins men's basketball
- Conference: Pacific-10
- Record: 17–11 (10–8, 4th Pac-10)
- Head coach: Larry Farmer
- Assistant coaches: Craig Impelman; Kevin O'Connor
- Home arena: Pauley Pavilion

1983–84 Pacific-10 Conference men's basketball standings
	Conf.				Overall
Team	W		L	PCT	W		L	PCT
No. 15 Washington	15	–	3	.833	24	–	7	.774
No. 17 Oregon State	15	–	3	.833	22	–	7	.759
Oregon	11	–	7	.611	16	–	13	.552
UCLA	10	–	8	.556	17	–	11	.607
Stanford	8	–	10	.444	19	–	12	.613
Arizona State	8	–	10	.444	13	–	15	.464
Arizona	8	–	10	.444	11	–	17	.393
USC	6	–	12	.333	11	–	20	.355
California	5	–	13	.278	12	–	16	.429
Washington State	4	–	14	.222	10	–	18	.357
As of April 15, 1984; Rankings from AP Poll

The 1983–84 UCLA Bruins men's basketball team represented the University of California, Los Angeles in the 1983–84 NCAA Division I men's basketball season. The Bruins started the season ranked 9th in the nation (AP Poll). On January 28, the Bruins hosted #2 DePaul, losing 84–68. UCLA beat the #13 (AP Poll) Washington Huskies 73–59, on March 1 for their biggest win of the season. UCLA's team finished 4th in the Pac-10 and was unranked in the final AP and coaches polls. This was Larry Farmer's third and final year as head coach of the UCLA Bruins. The team did not qualify for the NCAA Division I Men's Basketball Championship, and declined an invitation to the National Invitation Tournament.

== Starting lineup ==
Position	Player	Class
F	Kenny Fields	Sr.
F	Gary Maloncon	Jr.
C	Stuart Gray	Jr.
G	Ralph Jackson	Sr.
G	Montel Hatcher	Fr.

== Roster ==
1983–84 UCLA Bruins men's basketball team
Players
Coaches

Pos.	#	Name	Height	Weight	Year	Hometown
F	54	Kenny Fields	6 ft 7 in (2.01 m)	—	Sr	Iowa City, Iowa
G	4	Corey Gaines	6 ft 3 in (1.91 m)	—	Fr	Los Angeles, California
C	55	Stuart Gray	7 ft 0 in (2.13 m)	—	Jr	Panama Canal Zone, Panama
G	12	Montel Hatcher	6 ft 1 in (1.85 m)	—	Fr
G	30	Dave Immel	6 ft 3 in (1.91 m)	—	Fr
G	3	Ralph Jackson (C)	6 ft 2 in (1.88 m)	—	Sr
F	11	Curtis Knight	6 ft 5 in (1.96 m)	—	Sr
F	53	Gary Maloncon	6 ft 8 in (2.03 m)	—	Jr
G	25	Nigel Miguel	6 ft 5 in (1.96 m)	—	Jr
F	31	Reggie Miller	6 ft 6 in (1.98 m)	—	Fr	Riverside, California
C	32	Brad Wright	6 ft 11 in (2.11 m)	—	Jr	Hollywood, California

Head coach

Larry Farmer (UCLA)

Assistant coach(es)

- Craig Impelman
- Kevin O'Connor

Legend

- (C) Team captain
- (S) Suspended
- (I) Ineligible
- (W) Walk-on
- Injured
- Current redshirt

Roster

== Schedule ==
Date time, TV	Rank^{#}	Opponent^{#}	Result	Record	Site city, state
Regular Season
November 25, 1983	No. 9	Idaho State	W 85–58	1–0	Pauley Pavilion (9,823); Los Angeles, CA
November 26, 1983	No. 9	Long Beach State	W 65–59	2–0	Pauley Pavilion (7,738); Los Angeles, CA
December 3, 1983	No. 9	at Notre Dame	W 51–47	3–0	Athletic & Convocation Center (11,345); Notre Dame, IN
December 10, 1983	No. 7	New Mexico	L 60–65	3–1	Pauley Pavilion (8,215); Los Angeles, CA
December 17, 1983	No. 15	Memphis	W 65–51	4–1	Pauley Pavilion (12,338); Los Angeles, CA
December 19, 1983	No. 15	Howard	W 63–52	5–1	Pauley Pavilion (5,312); Los Angeles, CA
December 22, 1983	No. 9	St. Mary's	W 63–54	6–1	Pauley Pavilion (5,871); Los Angeles, CA
December 28, 1983	No. 7	BYU	W 82–73	7–1	Pauley Pavilion (12,548); Los Angeles, CA
January 5, 1984	No. 6	Arizona State	W 79–57	8–1 (1–0)	Pauley Pavilion (10,117); Los Angeles, CA
January 7, 1984	No. 6	at Arizona	W 61–58	9–1 (2–0)	McKale Center (7,683); Tucson, AZ
January 10, 1984	No. 6	Stanford	W 71–66	10–1 (3–0)	Pauley Pavilion (12,418); Los Angeles, CA
January 14, 1984	No. 6	at Oregon	L 51–62	10–2 (3–1)	McArthur Court (9,946); Eugene, OR
January 19, 1984	No. 9	California	W 76–54	11–2 (4–1)	Pauley Pavilion (9,318); Los Angeles, CA
January 22, 1984	No. 9	at Louisville	L 78–86	11–3	Freedom Hall (16,613); Louisville, KY
January 26, 1984	No. 15	USC	W 75–69 ^{OT}	12–3 (5–1)	Pauley Pavilion (10,238); Los Angeles, CA
January 28, 1984	No. 15	No. 2 DePaul	L 68–84	12–4	Pauley Pavilion (10,264); Los Angeles, CA
February 2, 1984	No. 20	at Washington State	W 73–59	13–4 (6–1)	Beasley Coliseum (9,000); Pullman, WA
February 4, 1984	No. 20	at Washington	L 81–89 ^{3OT}	13–5 (6–2)	Hec Edmundson Pavilion (7,814); Seattle, WA
February 9, 1984		Oregon	L 83–87 ^{OT}	13–6 (6–3)	Pauley Pavilion (9,334); Los Angeles, CA
February 11, 1984		Oregon State	L 63–72	13–7 (6–4)	Pauley Pavilion (7,841); Los Angeles, CA
February 16, 1984		at California	W 70–62 ^{OT}	14–7 (7–4)	Harmon Gym (6,656); Berkeley, CA
February 18, 1984		at Stanford	L 64–75	14–8 (7–5)	Maples Pavilion (7,750); Stanford, CA
February 25, 1984		at USC	L 72–80	14–9 (7–6)	Los Angeles Memorial Sports Arena (8,000); Los Angeles, CA
February 27, 1984		at Arizona State	L 67–76	14–10 (7–7)	ASU Activity Center (4,978); Tempe, AZ
March 1, 1984		No. 13 Washington	W 73–59	15–10 (8–7)	Pauley Pavilion (6,572); Los Angeles, CA
March 3, 1984		Washington State	W 83–64	16–10 (9–7)	Pauley Pavilion (4,865); Los Angeles, CA
March 8, 1984		Arizona	W 68–60	17–10 (10–7)	Pauley Pavilion (7,424); Los Angeles, CA
March 10, 1984		at Oregon State	L 65–70	17–11 (10–8)	Gill Coliseum (10,000); Corvallis, OR
*Non-conference game. ^{#}Rankings from AP Poll. (#) Tournament seedings in parentheses. All times are in Pacific Time.
