= 1983–84 Arizona Wildcats men's basketball team =

American college basketball season

1983–84 Arizona Wildcats men's basketball
- Conference: Pacific-10
- Record: 11–17 (8–10 Pac-10)
- Head coach: Lute Olson (1st season)
- Assistant coaches: Ricky Byrdsong (2nd season); Scott Thompson (1st season); Ken Burmeister (1st season)
- Home arena: McKale Center (Capacity: 14,545)

1983–84 Pacific-10 Conference men's basketball standings
	Conf.				Overall
Team	W		L	PCT	W		L	PCT
No. 15 Washington	15	–	3	.833	24	–	7	.774
No. 17 Oregon State	15	–	3	.833	22	–	7	.759
Oregon	11	–	7	.611	16	–	13	.552
UCLA	10	–	8	.556	17	–	11	.607
Stanford	8	–	10	.444	19	–	12	.613
Arizona State	8	–	10	.444	13	–	15	.464
Arizona	8	–	10	.444	11	–	17	.393
USC	6	–	12	.333	11	–	20	.355
California	5	–	13	.278	12	–	16	.429
Washington State	4	–	14	.222	10	–	18	.357
As of April 15, 1984; Rankings from AP Poll

The 1983–84 Arizona Wildcats men's basketball team represented the University of Arizona during the 1983–84 NCAA Division I men's basketball season. The team was led by new head coach Lute Olson, hired in March after nine seasons at Iowa.

The Wildcats played their home games on campus at the McKale Center in Tucson, and were a member of the Pacific-10 Conference. In the only season under Olson in which the Wildcats missed the NCAA tournament, Arizona finished with an overall record of 11–17 (8–10 in Pac-10, tied for fifth).

== Roster ==
1983–84 Arizona Wildcats men's basketball team
Players
Coaches

Pos.	#	Name	Height	Weight	Year	Previous school	Hometown
G	10	Brock Brunkhorst	6 ft 2 in (1.88 m)	—	Jr	East HS	Phoenix, AZ
G	11	Michael Tait	6 ft 2 in (1.88 m)	—	Fr	St. John Bosco HS	Compton, CA
F	14	Eddie Smith	6 ft 7 in (2.01 m)	—	Jr	Wichita West HS	Wichita, KS
G	20	Troy Cooke	6 ft 5 in (1.96 m)	—	Sr	Flowing Wells HS	Tucson, AZ
F	21	Keith Jackson	6 ft 5 in (1.96 m)	—	Jr	Willow Run HS	Ypsilanti, MI
G	22	Ken Ensor	6 ft 4 in (1.93 m)	—	Sr	Chrisman HS	Independence, MO
F	24	David Haskin	6 ft 5 in (1.96 m)	—	Sr	Sahuaro HS	Tucson, AZ
G	25	Steve Kerr	6 ft 3 in (1.91 m)	175 lb (79 kg)	Fr	Palisades Charter HS	Los Angeles, CA
F	32	Pete Williams	6 ft 7 in (2.01 m)	190 lb (86 kg)	Jr	Mt. San Antonio College	Harbor City, CA
G	34	Harvey Thompson	6 ft 4 in (1.93 m)	—	Sr	Cholla HS	Tucson, AZ
C	44	Andy Woodtli	6 ft 10 in (2.08 m)	—	Fr	Normal HS	Normal, IL
F	52	Greg Taylor	6 ft 6 in (1.98 m)	—	Sr	Brophy College Preparatory	Phoenix, AZ
C	54	Van Beard	6 ft 9 in (2.06 m)	—	Fr	Garfield HS	Seattle, WA

Head coach

- Lute Olson (Augsburg)

Assistant coach(es)

- Ricky Byrdsong (Iowa State)
- Scott Thompson (Iowa)
- Ken Burmeister (St. Mary's (TX))

Legend

- (C) Team captain
- (S) Suspended
- (I) Ineligible
- (W) Walk-on
- Injured
- Current redshirt

== Schedule and results ==
Date time, TV	Rank^{#}	Opponent^{#}	Result	Record	Site (attendance) city, state
Non-conference regular season
Nov 25, 1983*		Northern Arizona	W 72–65	1–0	McKale Center; Tucson, Arizona
Dec 1, 1983*		Cal State Fullerton	L 66–67	1–1	McKale Center; Tucson, Arizona
Dec 3, 1983*		at Providence	L 69–72	1–2	Providence Civic Center; Providence, Rhode Island
Dec 5, 1983*		at Iowa State	L 63–75	1–3	Hilton Coliseum; Ames, Iowa
Dec 10, 1983*		Pan American	L 60–65	1–4	McKale Center; Tucson, Arizona
Dec 17, 1983*		at San Diego State	L 80–90	1–5	San Diego Sports Arena; San Diego, California
Dec 23, 1983*		Tennessee	L 49–61	1–6	McKale Center; Tucson, Arizona
Dec 27, 1983*		vs. Texas Tech; Sun Bowl Tournament	W 51–49 ^{OT}	2–6	Special Events Center; El Paso, Texas
Dec 28, 1983*		at No. 16 UTEP; Sun Bowl Tournament	L 49–51 ^{OT}	2–7	Special Events Center; El Paso, Texas
Dec 30, 1983*		Fort Hays State	W 81–64	3–7	McKale Center; Tucson, Arizona
Pac-10 regular season
Jan 5, 1984		at Southern California	L 61–71	3–8 (0–1)	L.A. Sports Arena; Los Angeles, California
Jan 7, 1984		No. 6 UCLA; Rivalry	L 58–61	3–9 (0–2)	McKale Center; Tucson, Arizona
Jan 12, 1984		Washington	L 53–55	3–10 (0–3)	McKale Center; Tucson, Arizona
Jan 14, 1984		Washington State	L 49–51	3–11 (0–4)	McKale Center; Tucson, Arizona
Jan 20, 1984		Arizona State; Rivalry	W 71–49	4–11 (1–4)	McKale Center; Tucson, Arizona
Jan 28, 1984		at Oregon	L 55–69	4–12 (1–5)	McArthur Court; Eugene, Oregon
Feb 2, 1984		California	W 56–50	5–12 (2–5)	McKale Center; Tucson, Arizona
Feb 4, 1984		Stanford	L 66–74	5–13 (2–6)	McKale Center; Tucson, Arizona
Feb 11, 1984		at No. 17 Washington	L 51–56	5–14 (2–7)	Hec Edmundson Pavilion; Seattle, Washington
Feb 13, 1984		at Oregon State	L 48–53	5–15 (2–8)	Gill Coliseum; Corvallis, Oregon
Feb 17, 1984		at Arizona State	W 65–64	6–15 (3–8)	ASU Activity Center; Tempe, Arizona
Feb 23, 1984		Oregon	W 75–67	7–15 (4–8)	McKale Center; Tucson, Arizona
Feb 25, 1984*		No. 20 Oregon State	W 69–58	8–15 (5–8)	McKale Center; Tucson, Arizona
Feb 27, 1984*		USC	W 55–49	9–15 (6–8)	McKale Center; Tucson, Arizona
Mar 1, 1984		at Stanford	W 87–76	10–15 (7–8)	Maples Pavilion; Stanford, California
Mar 3, 1984		at California	L 62–70	10–16 (7–9)	Harmon Gym; Berkeley, California
Mar 8, 1984		at UCLA	L 60–68	10–17 (7–10)	Pauley Pavilion; Los Angeles, California
Mar 10, 1984		at Washington State	W 86–68	11–17 (8–10)	Friel Court; Pullman, Washington
*Non-conference game. ^{#}Rankings from AP Poll. (#) Tournament seedings in parentheses.
