= Jeff Reinert =

American basketball player and coach

Current position
- Title: Head coach
- Team: Southern Idaho

Biographical details
- Born: May 10, 1962 (age 64); Bellingham, Washington, U.S.

Playing career

Basketball
- 1980–1982: New Mexico
- 1983–1985: Gonzaga

Coaching career (HC unless noted)

Basketball
- 1987–1991: Simpson (assistant)
- 1989–1991: Nebraska (assistant)
- 1991–1994: BYU (assistant)
- 1994–2002: Utah Valley
- 2002–2007: Oregon State (assistant)
- 2007–2011: Fresno State (assoc. HC)
- 2012–2019: Santa Margarita Catholic HS
- 2019–present: Southern Idaho

Accomplishments and honors

Championships
- Scenic West Athletic Conference (1996)

Jeff Reinert (born May 10, 1962) is an American basketball coach and former collegiate basketball player. On May 21, 2019, Reinert became the 18th head coach in program history at the College of Southern Idaho.

From Bellingham, Washington, Reinert played college basketball for the University of New Mexico in Albuquerque, then transferred to Gonzaga University in Spokane in 1982 and played for the Bulldogs from 1983-85. He was a teammate of future Basketball Hall of Famer John Stockton during the 1983–84 season.

In 1985–86, he played professional basketball in Australia for the Ipswich Eagles before beginning his coaching career.

== Head coaching record ==
=== High school ===
Record table
Season	Team	Overall	Conference	Standing	Postseason
Santa Margarita Eagles (Trinity League) (2012–2019)
2012–13	Santa Margarita	16–16	0–10	6th	
2013–14	Santa Margarita	26–9	5–5	3rd	CIF SS 3AA Champions
2014–15	Santa Margarita	19–8	5–5	3rd	
2015–16	Santa Margarita	18–12	6–4	3rd	
2016–17	Santa Margarita	21–9	7–3	2nd	
2017–18	Santa Margarita	20–10	7–3	2nd	
2018–19	Santa Margarita	25–11	2–3	4th	CIF SS Division 1 Champions
Santa Margarita:		145–75 (.659)	32–33 (.492)		
Total:		145–75 (.659)			

=== College ===
Record table
Season	Team	Overall	Conference	Standing	Postseason
Utah Valley Wolverines (Scenic West Athletic Conference) (1994–2002)
1994–95	Utah Valley				
1995–96	Utah Valley				
1996–97	Utah Valley				
1997–98	Utah Valley				
1998–99	Utah Valley				
1999–00	Utah Valley	18–12	9–9		
2000–01	Utah Valley	19–13	9–9		
2001–02	Utah Valley	21–10	10–8		
Utah Valley:		179–77 (.699)			
Southern Idaho Golden Eagles (Scenic West Athletic Conference) (2019–Present)
2019-20	Southern Idaho	16-15	5-7	3rd	No
2020-21	Southern Idaho	21-4	13-2	1st	Yes
2021-22	Southern Idaho	24-9	12-6	3rd	Yes
2022-23	Southern Idaho	29-2	17-0	1st	Yes
2023-24	Southern Idaho	23-9	9-3	2nd	No
2024-25	Southern Idaho	22-10	9-6	2nd	No
Southern Idaho:		135–49 (.734)	65-24		
Total:		314–126 (.714)			
