= Gyno Pomare =

American-Panamanian basketball player

Gyno (g-no) Pomare
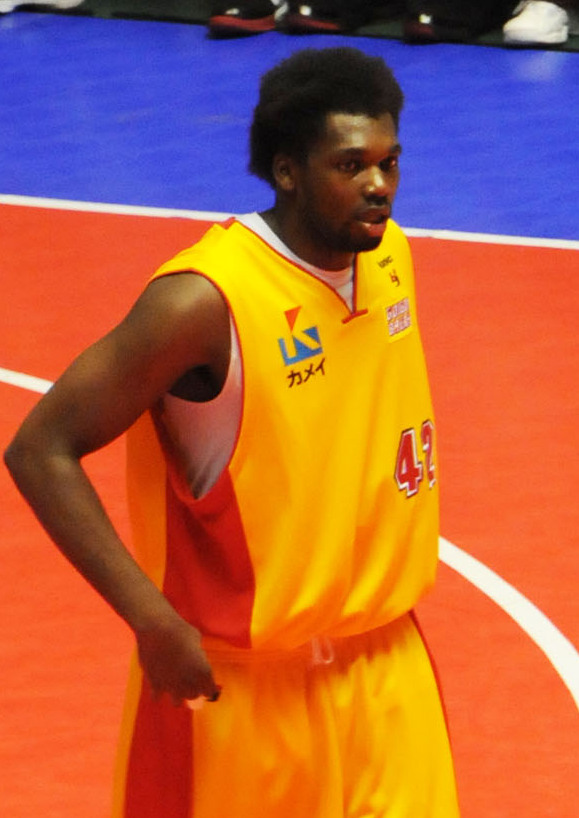

Free agent
- Position: Power forward

Personal information
- Born: April 5, 1986 (age 40) Oceanside, California
- Listed height: 6 ft 8 in (2.03 m)
- Listed weight: 240 lb (109 kg)

Career information
- High school: El Camino (Oceanside, California)
- College: San Diego (2005–2009)
- NBA draft: 2009: undrafted
- Playing career: 2009–2019

Career history
- 2009–2010: Sendai 89ers
- 2010: 9 de Julio de Río Tercero
- 2010–2011: Quilmes de Mar del Plata
- 2011–2012: Hamamatsu Higashimikawa Phoenix
- 2012–2013: Kyoto Hannaryz
- 2013–2014: Iwate Big Bulls
- 2014–2015: Aomori Wat's
- 2015–2017: Kanazawa Samuraiz
- 2017–2018: Osaka Evessa
- 2018: Iwate Big Bulls
- 2018: Shimane Susanoo Magic
- 2019: Passlab Yamagata Wyverns

Career highlights
- 2× bj League All-Star (2014, 2015)
Medals
Men's basketball
Representing Panama
Centrobasket
| Bronze medal – third place | 2010 Santo Domingo |

Gyno Pomare (born April 5, 1986) is an American-Panamanian professional basketball player. He is last played professionally with the Yamagata Wyverns of the B.League

== College career ==
Gyno (g-no) Pomare was a four-year player with the University of San Diego. He originally committed to the Toreros out of El Camino High School for the 2004 season, but sat out the 2004–05 season as a redshirt. In his first full season with the school, 2005–06, he averaged 10.4 points and 5 rebounds per game en route to being named to the All-West Coast Conference Freshman Team.

Pomare had a prolific career with the Toreros, eventually ending as the school's all-time leading scorer. He was the first player San Diego player since Scott Thompson (1985–87) to be named to the All-Conference Team three times. He also led the team to the 2008 NCAA Men's Division I Basketball Tournament where he scored a game-high 22 points on 10-12 shooting for the #13 seed Toreros in a first round upset over the University of Connecticut.

== Professional career ==
Although Pomare was a dark horse candidate for the 2009 NBA draft, he went undrafted. On August 18, 2009, the Sendai 89ers of the Japanese bj league, the top flight of Japanese basketball, announced that had signed Pomare for the 2009–10 season.

== National team career ==
Pomare, was eligible to play for the Panama men's national basketball team. He first participated with the team at the 2009 COCABA Championship. He also participated with the team at the FIBA Americas Championship 2009. In 2011, he was signed by Quilmes de Mar del Plata in the Torneo Nacional de Ascenso (Argentina).
