= 1983–84 Idaho Vandals men's basketball team =

American college basketball season

1983–84 Idaho Vandals men's basketball
- Conference: Big Sky Conference
- Record: 9–19 (4–10 Big Sky)
- Head coach: Bill Trumbo (1st season)
- Assistant coaches: Jim Halm; Garry Mendenhall
- Home arena: Kibbie Dome

1983–84 Big Sky men's basketball standings
	Conf.				Overall
Team	W		L	PCT	W		L	PCT
Weber State	12	–	2	.857	23	–	8	.742
Montana	9	–	5	.643	23	–	7	.767
Montana State	7	–	7	.500	14	–	15	.483
Nevada †	7	–	7	.500	17	–	14	.548
Idaho State	6	–	8	.429	12	–	19	.387
Boise State	6	–	8	.429	15	–	12	.556
Northern Arizona	5	–	9	.357	13	–	14	.481
Idaho	4	–	10	.286	9	–	19	.321
† 1984 Big Sky tournament winner

The 1983–84 Idaho Vandals men's basketball team represented the University of Idaho during the 1983–84 NCAA Division I men's basketball season. Members of the Big Sky Conference, the Vandals were led by first-year head coach Bill Trumbo and played their home games on campus at the Kibbie Dome in Moscow, Idaho.

The Vandals were 9–18 overall in the regular season and 4–10 in conference play; after four consecutive years in the top half of the standings (with two titles), Idaho returned to last place in the Big Sky. The conference tournament previously included only the top four teams; it was expanded this year to include all eight. The quarterfinals were at campus sites on Tuesday, and eighth-seeded Idaho fell to league champion Weber State.

Two Inland Empire winning streaks ended this season: after three straight wins over Washington State in the Battle of the Palouse, the Cougars beat the Vandals by thirteen points in Pullman in December. Gonzaga broke a four-game losing streak to Idaho with a seven-point win in Moscow in January; it was senior point guard John Stockton's sole win in the series.

No Vandals were named to the all-conference team; senior center Pete Prigge was honorable mention. Two years earlier as a sophomore, he was the sixth man on the successful 1982 team.

Hired in early April, Trumbo was previously the head coach at Santa Rosa Junior College in northern California; he succeeded alumnus Don Monson, who departed after five seasons for Oregon of the Pac-10 Conference.

== Roster ==
1983–84 Idaho Vandals men's basketball team
Players
Coaches

Pos.	#	Name	Height	Weight	Year	Previous school	Hometown
G	10	Stan Arnold	6 ft 0 in (1.83 m)	185 lb (84 kg)	Sr	San Jose CC	San Jose, CA
F	13	Tom Stalick	6 ft 7 in (2.01 m)	211 lb (96 kg)	Fr	West Albany HS	Albany, OR
G	14	Ernest Sanders	6 ft 2 in (1.88 m)	185 lb (84 kg)	Fr	Pasco HS	Pasco, WA
G	21	Chris Carey	5 ft 10 in (1.78 m)	172 lb (78 kg)	Fr	West Albany HS	Albany, OR
C	24	Pete Prigge	6 ft 8 in (2.03 m)	209 lb (95 kg)	Sr	Fort Vancouver HS	Vancouver, WA
F	30	Zane Frazier	6 ft 5 in (1.96 m)	206 lb (93 kg)	Jr	Fairfax HS	Los Angeles, CA
G	32	Ulf Spears	6 ft 4 in (1.93 m)	194 lb (88 kg)	Fr	Benson Poly HS	Portland, OR
F	33	Dan Wright (S)	6 ft 5 in (1.96 m)	—	Jr	Fullerton JC
G	34	Matt Haskins	6 ft 3 in (1.91 m)	185 lb (84 kg)	So	Columbia HS	Richland, WA
F	40	Mark Hoke	6 ft 7 in (2.01 m)	201 lb (91 kg)	Jr	Columbia HS	Richland, WA
G	42	Freeman Watkins	6 ft 3 in (1.91 m)	187 lb (85 kg)	Sr	Eisenhower HS	Utica, MI
F	44	Steve Adams	6 ft 6 in (1.98 m)	190 lb (86 kg)	Fr		Portland, OR
C	52	Pete Reitz	6 ft 11 in (2.11 m)	220 lb (100 kg)	So	Placer HS	Auburn, CA
F	55	Frank Garza	6 ft 6 in (1.98 m)	210 lb (95 kg)	Jr	Santa Rosa JC	Anacortes, WA

Head coach

- Bill Trumbo (Chapman)

Assistant coach(es)

- Jim Halm (Hawaiʻi)
- Garry Mendenhall (Santa Clara)

Legend

- (C) Team captain
- (S) Suspended
- (I) Ineligible
- (W) Walk-on
- Injured
- Current redshirt

== Postseason result ==
Date time, TV	Rank^{#}	Opponent^{#}	Result	Record	Site (attendance) city, state
Big Sky tournament
Tue, March 6; 6:30 pm	(8)	at (1) No. 19 Weber State; Quarterfinal	L 58–67	9–19	Dee Events Center (5,146); Ogden, Utah
*Non-conference game. ^{#}Rankings from UPI coaches poll. (#) Tournament seedings in parentheses. All times are in Pacific time.
