= Jim Brovelli =

American basketball player and coach

Personal information
- Born: April 15, 1942 (age 84) San Francisco, California, U.S.

Career information
- High school: St. Ignatius (San Francisco, California)
- College: San Francisco (1961–1964)
- NBA draft: 1964: undrafted
- Position: Point guard
- Coaching career: 1973–2000

Career history

Coaching
- 1973–1984: San Diego
- 1985–1995: San Francisco
- 1996–1997: Denver Nuggets (assistant)
- 1997–1999: Washington Wizards (assistant)
- 1999: Washington Wizards (interim)
- 1999–2000: Sioux Falls Skyforce

James Mario Brovelli (born April 15, 1942) is the former men's basketball head coach of the University of San Francisco (USF) Dons and hall of fame player.

== Biography ==
As a player Brovelli was a three-year letterman for USF, helping lead the Dons to the NCAA Western Regional in 1963 and 1964. He earned All-WCC honorable mention honors in 1964. Later, he was named the 1965 AAU Athlete of the Year.

He became the Dons head coach in 1984. Starting from scratch after USF's self-imposed three-year hiatus stemming from various NCAA recruiting violations incurred during the Quintin Dailey era, Brovelli led the Dons for ten seasons, including a 19-win campaign in 1993. His greatest victory as USF head coach came in 1988 when USF achieved a stunning upset of Digger Phelps and Notre Dame in front of a sellout crowd in USF's Memorial Gymnasium. He finished with 131 career victories at USF.

Prior to his USF stint he was the head coach for the University of San Diego Toreros from 1973 to 1984, successfully guiding their transition from NCAA Division II power to the Division I ranks. He took the Division II program to three NCAA Western Regionals, winning the championship in 1977–1978 and advancing to the Final Four while earning District VIII Coach of the Year honors. His final three years of coaching the Division II program saw the teams go 20–7, 22–7, and 19–7. Brovelli guided USD's move to the Division I West Coast Conference in 1979. His programs improved each year in the win column, and during his final year (1983–1984) at USD, he directed the Toreros to the program's first WCC championship and first appearance in the NCAA Division I Tournament. That season the Toreros finished 18–10 overall and 9–3 in league play, and Brovelli earned WCC Coach of the Year honors. At the time of his departure from San Diego he had 160 career victories and was the winningest men's basketball coach in USD history (since surpassed by Brad Holland).

After departing USF he was named director of player development with the Denver Nuggets on February 1, 1996. Later that following season he added assistant coach duties for the Nuggets.

Brovelli joined long-time friend, Bernie Bickerstaff, in 1998–99 as assistant coach, and on April 6, 1999, was named interim head coach of the Washington Wizards. He coached the final 18 games of the 1999 lockout-shortened season.

He next coached the Sioux Falls Skyforce in the Continental Basketball Association from 1999 to 2000, where he led the 'Force to a record of 30–26 and a playoff appearance.

Brovelli then signed on as a scout with the NBA's Charlotte Bobcats.

He has also coached the Japanese National Team and was a volunteer coach for the Minnesota Timberwolves for a season, in addition to serving as a member of the NCAA Recruiting Committee and Academic Committee.

More recently he was named director of athletics at College of Marin, while simultaneously providing radio color commentary for the USF Dons men's basketball home games.

Brovelli was inducted into the University of San Francisco Athletics Hall of Fame in 1982.

== Head coaching record ==
=== NBA ===
Team	Year	G	W	L	W–L%	Finish	PG	PW	PL	PW–L%	Result
Washington	1998–99	18	5	13	.278	6th in Atlantic	—	—	—	—	Missed playoffs
Career		18	5	13	.278		0	0	0	–	

=== NCAA ===
Record table
Season	Team	Overall	Conference	Standing	Postseason
San Diego Toreros (Division II Independent) (1973–1979)
1973–74	San Diego	16–11	–		Division II First Round
1974–75	San Diego	11–15	–		
1975–76	San Diego	15–10	–		
1976–77	San Diego	20–7	–		
1977–78	San Diego	22–7	–		Division II Quarterfinals
1978–79	San Diego	19–7	–		Division II Regional Semifinals
San Diego Toreros (West Coast Athletic Conference) (1979–1984)
1979–80	San Diego	6–19	2–14	9th	
1980–81	San Diego	10–16	3–11	T–7th	
1981–82	San Diego	11–15	4–10	6th	
1982–83	San Diego	12–14	5–7	4th	
1983–84	San Diego	18–10	9–3	1st	NCAA Division I Preliminary Round
San Diego:		160–131 (.550)	23–45 (.338)		
San Francisco Dons (West Coast Athletic Conference/ West Coast Conference) (1985–1995)
1985–86	San Francisco	7–21	2–12	8th	
1986–87	San Francisco	16–12	6–8	T–4th	
1987–88	San Francisco	13–15	5–9	6th	
1988–89	San Francisco	16–12	8–6	4th	
1989–90	San Francisco	8–20	4–10	T–6th	
1990–91	San Francisco	12–17	4–10	7th	
1991–92	San Francisco	13–16	4–10	T–6th	
1992–93	San Francisco	19–12	8–6	4th	
1993–94	San Francisco	17–11	8–6	T–2nd	
1994–95	San Francisco	11–18	4–10	T–6th	
San Francisco:		132–154 (.462)	53–87 (.379)		
Total:		292–285 (.506)			
National champion Postseason invitational champion Conference regular season champion Conference regular season and conference tournament champion Division regular season champion Division regular season and conference tournament champion Conference tournament champion

== Personal life ==
Brovelli received his degree in Business Administration from the University of San Francisco in 1964 and his master's from the University of the Pacific in 1966.

Brovelli is a long-time resident of San Rafael, CA with his wife, Nada. Their son, Mike (USF '95), was a Dons basketball standout, and their daughter, Michele (USD '96), was a Toreros basketball standout.
