= Corey Belser =

American basketball player (born 1982)

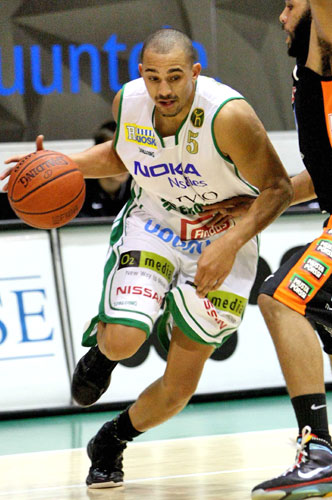

Personal information
- Born: November 22, 1982 (age 43) Nurnberg, Germany
- Listed height: 6 ft 6.75 in (2.00 m)
- Listed weight: 210 lb (95 kg)

Career information
- High school: Bethel (Spanaway, Washington)
- College: San Diego (2001–2006)
- NBA draft: 2006: undrafted
- Playing career: 2006–2012
- Position: Small forward / shooting guard
- Coaching career: 2012–present

Career history

Playing
- 2006–2009: Olympia Larissa
- 2009: Aris Thessaloniki
- 2009–2010: Espoon Honka
- 2010: Politekhnika-Halychyna
- 2010–2011: Espoon Honka
- 2011–2012: Charleville-Mézières

Coaching
- 2012–2013: Cleveland Cavaliers (assistant VC)
- 2013–2014: Miami Heat (assistant VC)
- 2014–2016: Sioux Falls Skyforce (assistant)
- 2017–2018: Reno Bighorns (assistant)
- 2018–present: Maldives

Career highlights
- As coach: NBA D-League champion (2016)

Corey Alexander Belser (born November 22, 1982) is a former American professional basketball player, who is currently the head coach for the Maldives Senior National Basketball Team. Standing at 6 ft 6.75 in (2.00 m), Belser played at the shooting guard and small forward positions. He played college basketball for the University of San Diego.

== College career ==
The 2.00 m (6 ft 6 ¾ in) swingman played college basketball with the University of San Diego and in 2006 he was voted as the College Insider NCAA Defensive Player of the Year. He was also voted to the All Mid-Majors First Team in both 2005 and 2006, and to the All West Coast Conference First Team and named the All West Coast Conference Defensive Player of the Year. He was also an NCAA Arthur Ashe Academic All-American, graduating from the University of San Diego with a Masters in the Science of Leadership.

== Professional career ==
After graduating from college in 2006, Belser went undrafted in the 2006 NBA draft. However, he was invited to try out for the Dallas Mavericks. He played for the Mavericks' summer league roster in both the Las Vegas Summer League and the Rocky Mountain Revue. Despite playing well, Belser was not chosen for the Mavericks' final NBA roster, but he was immediately offered a spot playing for Olympia Larissa in the Greek League. He helped his team reach the Greek League playoffs for their 1st ever appearance in 2007 and 2008, and he earned a league honorable mention in 2007. Summer 2010 Belser shined in the Dolphin Park Classic in Vancouver, B.C., on team "Reign" with good friend and semi-pro player Virgil Matthews. Belser put on a "clinic" as said by many Canadian basketball pundits going on several shooting sprees having multiple defenders thrown at him without any effect. The Reign made a deep playoff run, losing to eventual champs the X-falcons led by Randy Nohr former Team Canada All-Star. In late 2010 he played for Aris in A1 Greek League but finished in his season in Ukraine.

== Coaching career ==
In 2012, Corey Belser was hired by the NBA’s Cleveland Cavaliers to work on the coaching staff. The following year, he went on to coach for the Miami Heat. In 2014, he served as an assistant coach to the Miami Heat's development team, the Sioux Falls Skyforce. The next season, the Skyforce finished with a D League-best 40–10 record, and went on to win the league championship with a 2–1 Finals series win over the Los Angeles D-Fenders.

In September 2017, Belser was named assistant coach for the Sacramento Kings NBA G League team, the Reno Bighorns. The Bighorns finished the season taking first in the Pacific Division.
