= 1983–84 Washington Huskies men's basketball team =

American college basketball season

1983–84 Washington Huskies men's basketball

Pacific-10 Conference Co-champions

NCAA tournament, Sweet Sixteen
- Conference: Pacific-10 Conference

Ranking
- Coaches: No. 15
- AP: No. 15
- Record: 24–7 (15–3 Pac-10)
- Head coach: Marv Harshman (13th season)
- Assistant coach: Bob Johnson
- Home arena: Hec Edmundson Pavilion

1983–84 Pacific-10 Conference men's basketball standings
| | Conf. | | | | Overall |
| Team | W | | L | PCT | W | | L | PCT |
|---|---|---|---|---|---|---|---|---|
| No. 15 Washington | 15 | – | 3 | .833 | 24 | – | 7 | .774 |
| No. 17 Oregon State | 15 | – | 3 | .833 | 22 | – | 7 | .759 |
| Oregon | 11 | – | 7 | .611 | 16 | – | 13 | .552 |
| UCLA | 10 | – | 8 | .556 | 17 | – | 11 | .607 |
| Stanford | 8 | – | 10 | .444 | 19 | – | 12 | .613 |
| Arizona State | 8 | – | 10 | .444 | 13 | – | 15 | .464 |
| Arizona | 8 | – | 10 | .444 | 11 | – | 17 | .393 |
| USC | 6 | – | 12 | .333 | 11 | – | 20 | .355 |
| California | 5 | – | 13 | .278 | 12 | – | 16 | .429 |
| Washington State | 4 | – | 14 | .222 | 10 | – | 18 | .357 |
As of April 15, 1984; Rankings from AP Poll

The 1983–84 Washington Huskies men's basketball team represented the University of Washington for the 1983–84 NCAA Division I men's basketball season. Led by thirteenth-year head coach Marv Harshman, the Huskies were members of the Pacific-10 Conference and played their home games on campus at Hec Edmundson Pavilion in Seattle, Washington.

The Huskies were 22–6 overall in the regular season and 15–3 in conference play, co-champions with Oregon State, and ranked fifteenth in both polls. There was no conference tournament this season; it debuted three years later. Nearing the end of the regular season in late February, Harshman's contract was extended for one more year.

Washington made the NCAA tournament for the first time in eight years and was seeded sixth in the West regional of the 53-team field, with the first two rounds at Beasley Coliseum in Pullman. The Huskies defeated Nevada and #14 Duke to advance to the Sweet Sixteen, but fell to upstart Dayton at Pauley Pavilion in Los Angeles to finish at 24–7 (.774).

This year's Final Four was in Seattle at the Kingdome.

== Postseason results ==
| Date time, TV | Rank^{#} | Opponent^{#} | Result | Record | Site (attendance) city, state |
NCAA Tournament
| Fri, March 16*; 6:10 pm | (6W) No. 15 | vs. (11W) Nevada; First round | W 64–54 | 23–6 | Beasley Coliseum (6,500); Pullman, Washington |
| Sun, March 18*; 4:00 pm, CBS | (6W) No. 15 | vs. (3W) No. 14 Duke; Second round | W 80–78 | 24–6 | Beasley Coliseum (10,504); Pullman, Washington |
| Fri, March 23*; 6:40 pm, ESPN | (6W) No. 15 | vs. (10W) Dayton; Sweet Sixteen | L 58–64 | 24–7 | Pauley Pavilion (12,542); Los Angeles, California |
*Non-conference game. ^{#}Rankings from AP poll. (#) Tournament seedings in parentheses. All times are in Pacific time.
