= 1983–84 Oregon State Beavers men's basketball team =

American college basketball season

1983–84 Oregon State Beavers men's basketball

Pac-10 regular season co-champions

NCAA tournament
- Conference: Pac-10 Conference

Ranking
- Coaches: No. 20
- AP: No. 17
- Record: 22–7 (15–3 Pac-10)
- Head coach: Ralph Miller (14th season)
- Assistant coach: Bob Gottlieb (1st season)
- Home arena: Gill Coliseum

1983–84 Pacific-10 Conference men's basketball standings
	Conf.				Overall
Team	W		L	PCT	W		L	PCT
No. 15 Washington	15	–	3	.833	24	–	7	.774
No. 17 Oregon State	15	–	3	.833	22	–	7	.759
Oregon	11	–	7	.611	16	–	13	.552
UCLA	10	–	8	.556	17	–	11	.607
Stanford	8	–	10	.444	19	–	12	.613
Arizona State	8	–	10	.444	13	–	15	.464
Arizona	8	–	10	.444	11	–	17	.393
USC	6	–	12	.333	11	–	20	.355
California	5	–	13	.278	12	–	16	.429
Washington State	4	–	14	.222	10	–	18	.357
As of April 15, 1984; Rankings from AP Poll

The 1983–84 Oregon State Beavers men's basketball team represented the Oregon State University as a member of the Pacific 10 Conference during the 1983–84 NCAA Division I men's basketball season. They were led by 14th-year head coach Ralph Miller, and played their home games on campus at Gill Coliseum in Corvallis, Oregon.

Oregon State finished the regular season at 22–7 (15–3 Pac-10) and won a share of the conference title with Washington.

== Roster ==
1983–84 Oregon State Beavers men's basketball team
Players
Coaches

Pos.	#	Name	Height	Weight	Year	Hometown
F	52	Charlie Sitton	6 ft 8 in (2.03 m)	205 lb (93 kg)	Sr	McMinnville, Oregon
F	45	A.C. Green	6 ft 9 in (2.06 m)	215 lb (98 kg)	Jr	Portland, Oregon

Head coach

- Ralph Miller

Assistant coach(es)

- Bob Gottlieb

Legend

- (C) Team captain
- (S) Suspended
- (I) Ineligible
- (W) Walk-on
- Injured
- Current redshirt

== Schedule and results ==
Date time, TV	Rank^{#}	Opponent^{#}	Result	Record	Site city, state
Regular season
Dec 2, 1983*	No. 10	vs. Arkansas State; Amana-Hawkeye Classic	W 49–40	1–0	Carver-Hawkeye Arena; Iowa City, Iowa
Dec 3, 1983*	No. 10	at No. 5 Iowa; Amana-Hawkeye Classic	L 45–56	1–1	Carver-Hawkeye Arena (15,450); Iowa City, Iowa
Dec 10, 1983*	No. 18	No. 5 Iowa	W 53–49	2–1	Gill Coliseum (10,000); Corvallis, Oregon
Dec 16, 1983*		Utah	W 62–49	3–1	Gill Coliseum; Corvallis, Oregon
Dec 17, 1983*		at Portland	W 65–49	4–1	Howard Hall; Portland, Oregon
Mar 10, 1984		UCLA	W 70–65	22–6 (15–3)	Gill Coliseum; Corvallis, Oregon
NCAA Tournament
Mar 15, 1984*	(6 ME) No. 17	vs. (11 ME) West Virginia; First round	L 62–64	22–7	Birmingham-Jefferson Civic Center; Birmingham, Alabama
*Non-conference game. ^{#}Rankings from AP Poll. (#) Tournament seedings in parentheses. ME=Mideast. All times are in Pacific.

== NBA draft ==
Round	Pick	Player	NBA club
2	38	Charlie Sitton	Dallas Mavericks
