= Scott Thompson (basketball player) =

American former basketball player

Personal information
- Born: Citrus Heights, California
- Listed height: 7 ft 0 in (2.13 m)
- Listed weight: 260 lb (118 kg)

Career information
- High school: Mesa Verde (Citrus Heights, California)
- College: San Diego (1983–1987)
- NBA draft: 1987: 4th round, 81st overall pick
- Drafted by: Washington Bullets
- Position: Center

Career history
- 1987–1988: Mississippi Jets

Career highlights
- WCAC Player of the Year (1987); 3× First-team All-WCAC (1985–1987); WCAC Freshman of the Year (1984)
- Stats at Basketball Reference

Scott Thompson is an American former basketball player. He is one of the best players in University of San Diego history and was named the conference player of the year of the West Coast Athletic Conference (WCAC) in 1987.

== College career ==
Thompson, a 7-foot (2.1 m) center from Mesa Verde High School in Citrus Heights, California, played basketball for coach Hank Egan at San Diego, where he was friends and teammates with future NBA coach Eric Musselman. Thompson was an immediate impact player for the Toreros, helping the team to the first NCAA tournament berth in program history in 1984. He was also named WCAC freshman of the year.

For the next three seasons, Thompson was named first-team WCAC All-Conference, becoming the first player in school history to be so honored. As a senior in 1986–87, Thompson led USD to a 24–6 record, its best in program history. The team drew more interest than their crosstown counterparts at San Diego State, and they managed to sell out home games while students were off during Christmas break. The Toreros lost a heart-breaking first-round game in the 1987 NCAA tournament to Auburn, 62–61. Thompson had a big individual year, averaging 15.9 points, 7.4 rebounds and 1.4 blocks per game and becoming the first player in school history to be named WCAC player of the year. Still, the Toreros played together as a team and were not solely dependent on Thompson.

Thompson finished his career with 1,379 points (12.1 per game) and graduated as the school's leading Division I career scoring leader. He also left as the school's all time Division I rebounding leader with 740 (6.5 per game). Both marks have since been surpassed. Thompson was named to the USD athletic hall of fame in 2000.

== Professional career ==
After graduating from USD, Thompson was drafted by the Washington Bullets in the fourth round (81st pick) of the 1987 NBA draft, however he never played in the league. Thompson played one season in the Continental Basketball Association for the Mississippi Jets.
