= Hank Egan =

American basketball player-coach

Biographical details
- Born: August 17, 1937 (age 89)

Playing career
- 1957–1960: Navy

Coaching career (HC unless noted)
- 1966–1971: Air Force (assistant)
- 1971–1984: Air Force
- 1984–1994: San Diego
- 1994–2002: San Antonio Spurs (assistant)
- 2002–2003: Golden State Warriors (assistant)
- 2005–2010: Cleveland Cavaliers (assistant)

Head coaching record
- Overall: 304–311
- Tournaments: 0–1 (NCAA Division I)

Accomplishments and honors

Championships
- NBA champion (1999); WCAC regular season (1987)

Awards
- 2× WCAC Coach of the Year (1986, 1987)

Henry Patrick Egan Jr. (born August 17, 1937) is an American former basketball coach. He served as the head basketball coach at the United States Air Force Academy from 1971 to 1984 and the University of San Diego from 1984 to 1994, compiling a career college basketball record of 304–311. Egan subsequently worked an assistant coach in the National Basketball Association (NBA) with the San Antonio Spurs from 1994 to 2002, the Golden State Warriors in 2002–03, and the Cleveland Cavaliers from 2005 to 2010. Gregg Popovich was an assistant coach under Egan at Air Force, while Egan was an assistant coach under Popovich with the Spurs.

== Head coaching record ==
Record table
Season	Team	Overall	Conference	Standing	Postseason
Air Force Falcons (NCAA University Division / Division I independent) (1971–1980)
1971–72	Air Force	12–13			
1972–73	Air Force	14–10			
1973–74	Air Force	11–13			
1974–75	Air Force	13–12			
1975–76	Air Force	16–9			
1976–77	Air Force	12–15			
1977–78	Air Force	15–10			
1978–79	Air Force	12–13			
1979–80	Air Force	8–17			
Air Force Falcons (Western Athletic Conference) (1980–1984)
1980–81	Air Force	9–18	3–13	8th	
1981–82	Air Force	8–19	3–13	8th	
1982–83	Air Force	10–17	2–14	9th	
1983–84	Air Force	8–19	3–13	9th	
Air Force:		148–185	11–53		
San Diego Toreros (West Coast Conference) (1984–1994)
1984–85	San Diego	16–11	5–7	4th	
1985–86	San Diego	19–9	9–5	3rd	
1986–87	San Diego	24–6	13–1	1st	NCAA Division I First Round
1987–88	San Diego	11–17	3–11	7th	
1988–89	San Diego	8–20	2–12	T–7th	
1989–90	San Diego	16–12	9–5	3rd	
1990–91	San Diego	17–12	8–6	3rd	
1991–92	San Diego	14–14	6–8	5th	
1992–93	San Diego	13–14	7–7	5th	
1993–94	San Diego	18–11	7–7	4th	
San Diego:		156–126	69–69		
Total:		304–311			
