= 1983–84 Boise State Broncos men's basketball team =

American college basketball season

1983–84 Boise State Broncos men's basketball
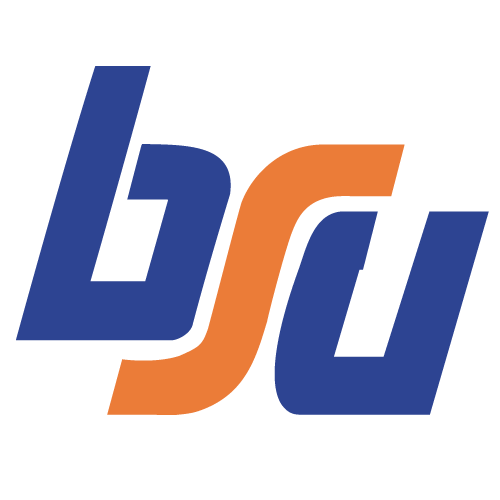
- Conference: Big Sky Conference
- Record: 15–12 (6–8 Big Sky)
- Head coach: Bobby Dye (1st season)
- Home arena: BSU Pavilion

1983–84 Big Sky men's basketball standings
	Conf.				Overall
Team	W		L	PCT	W		L	PCT
Weber State	12	–	2	.857	23	–	8	.742
Montana	9	–	5	.643	23	–	7	.767
Montana State	7	–	7	.500	14	–	15	.483
Nevada †	7	–	7	.500	17	–	14	.548
Idaho State	6	–	8	.429	12	–	19	.387
Boise State	6	–	8	.429	15	–	12	.556
Northern Arizona	5	–	9	.357	13	–	14	.481
Idaho	4	–	10	.286	9	–	19	.321
† 1984 Big Sky tournament winner

The 1983–84 Boise State Broncos men's basketball team represented Boise State University during the 1983–84 NCAA Division I men's basketball season. The Broncos were led by first-year head coach Bobby Dye and played their home games on campus at the BSU Pavilion in Boise, Idaho.

They finished the regular season at 15–11 overall, with a 6–8 record in the Big Sky Conference, tied for fifth in the standings. The conference tournament was expanded to include all eight teams this season, with the quarterfinals at four campus sites. Boise State met third seed Montana State in Bozeman and lost by a point.

Dye was hired in late March, after two years at Cal State Bakersfield. Winless in the season prior to his arrival, he led the Roadrunners to the Division II Final Four in 1983. He had earlier led Cal State Fullerton for seven years.

Senior swingman Vince Hinchen was named to the all-conference team and junior guard Frank Jackson was honorable mention. Hinchen was an honorable mention Associated Press All-American, and a fifth-round selection (96th overall) of the Cleveland Cavaliers in the 1984 NBA draft.

== Postseason results ==
Date time, TV	Rank^{#}	Opponent^{#}	Result	Record	Site (attendance) city, state
Big Sky tournament
Tue, March 6; 7:30 pm	(6)	at (3) Montana State; Quarterfinal	L 64–65	15–12	Brick Breeden Fieldhouse (3,758); Bozeman, Montana
*Non-conference game. ^{#}Rankings from AP poll. (#) Tournament seedings in parentheses. All times are in Mountain time.
