= David Fizdale =

American professional basketball coach (born 1974)

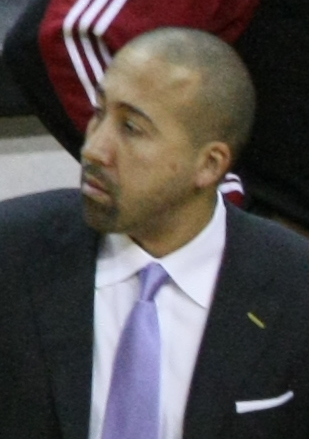
- Fizdale in 2009

Personal information
- Born: June 16, 1974 (age 52) Los Angeles, California, U.S.
- Listed height: 6 ft 2 in (1.88 m)

Career information
- High school: John C. Fremont (Los Angeles, California)
- College: San Diego (1992–1996)
- NBA draft: 1996: undrafted
- Position: Point guard
- Coaching career: 1998–present

Career history

Coaching
- 1998–2002: San Diego (assistant)
- 2002–2004: Fresno State (assistant)
- 2003–2004: Golden State Warriors (assistant)
- 2004–2008: Atlanta Hawks (assistant)
- 2008–2016: Miami Heat (assistant)
- 2016–2017: Memphis Grizzlies
- 2018–2019: New York Knicks
- 2021–2022: Los Angeles Lakers (assistant)
- 2023–2025: Phoenix Suns (assistant)

Career highlights
- As player: All-WCC (1996); As assistant coach: 2× NBA champion (2012, 2013)

David Sean Fizdale (born June 16, 1974) is an American professional basketball coach who last was an assistant coach for the Phoenix Suns of the National Basketball Association (NBA). He previously was an associate general manager for the Utah Jazz, an assistant coach for the Los Angeles Lakers, the head coach for the New York Knicks and Memphis Grizzlies, and was an assistant coach for the Atlanta Hawks, Golden State Warriors and the Miami Heat. He won two championships with the Heat in 2012 and 2013.

== Career ==
Born in Los Angeles, Fizdale attended Fremont High School in Los Angeles, where he played as a point guard for the school's basketball team. He subsequently attended college at the University of San Diego, where he graduated with a B.A. in communications and a minor in sociology. During his senior year, he was also named a member of the All-WCC Team. After a couple years removed from graduating, Fizdale would begin his coaching career by first being an assistant coach for his alma mater from 1998 until 2002 before joining Fresno State University as an assistant coach there for a couple of seasons afterward.

Between 2003 and 2016, Fizdale was an assistant coach for the Golden State Warriors, Atlanta Hawks, and Miami Heat. During his tenure with the Heat, Fizdale coached "Team Shaq", a squad selected by Shaquille O'Neal, at the 2013 Rising Stars Challenge during the NBA All-Star Weekend. His team was defeated 163–135, by Charles Barkley's "Team Chuck", coached by then San Antonio Spurs' assistant coach Mike Budenholzer. After the reshuffle of the Heat's coaching staff, Fizdale became an associate head coach after Ron Rothstein decided to retire from his coaching career and Bob McAdoo was assigned to the scouting staff.

On May 29, 2016, Fizdale was named as the head coach of the Memphis Grizzlies. He led the Grizzlies to a 43–39 record in the 2016–17 season, reaching the Western Conference playoffs. After a 7–12 start to the 2017–18 season, including eight consecutive losses, and a publicized fourth-quarter benching of Marc Gasol, Fizdale was fired from the team on November 27, 2017.

On May 7, 2018, Fizdale was named as the head coach of the New York Knicks signing a four-year deal with the organization. On December 6, 2019, he was fired by the Knicks after a 4–18 start to their season.

On September 15, 2021, Fizdale was hired by the Los Angeles Lakers as an assistant coach.

On June 29, 2022, Fizdale was hired as the associate general manager for the Utah Jazz.

On June 21, 2023, Fizdale was hired by the Phoenix Suns as an assistant coach. Fizdale would later get removed from the team's coaching staff on May 12, 2024, alongside the rest of Frank Vogel's coaching staff following their hiring of new head coach Mike Budenholzer. However, after an attempt to promote him into a front office position later in the month, as well as receive interest in joining the Chicago Bulls, Fizdale was reported to return to his role as an assistant coach for the Phoenix Suns on May 29. His return to the Suns would be made official on August 6. On August 12, 2025, months after head coach Mike Budenholzer was fired and Cleveland Cavaliers assistant coach Jordan Ott was hired over Fizdale to the team's newest head coach due to a stated desire for a change in direction regarding head coaching statuses, it was confirmed that Fizdale would not return to the Phoenix Suns for a third season under a third straight coaching change.

== Head coaching record ==
Legend
Regular season	G	Games coached	W	Games won	L	Games lost	W–L %	Win–loss %
Playoffs	PG	Playoff games	PW	Playoff wins	PL	Playoff losses	PW–L %	Playoff win–loss %

Team	Year	G	W	L	W–L%	Finish	PG	PW	PL	PW–L%	Result
Memphis	2016–17	82	43	39	.524	3rd in Southwest	6	2	4	.333	Lost in First round
Memphis	2017–18	19	7	12	.368	(fired)	—	—	—	—	—
New York	2018–19	82	17	65	.207	5th in Atlantic	—	—	—	—	Missed playoffs
New York	2019–20	22	4	18	.182	(fired)	—	—	—	—	—
Career		205	71	134	.346		6	2	4	.333	

== Personal life ==
Fizdale is married to marketer Natasha Sen and has one son from a prior relationship.
