= 1983–84 Washington State Cougars men's basketball team =

American college basketball season

1983–84 Washington State Cougars men's basketball
- Conference: Pacific-10
- Record: 10–18 (4–14 Pac-10)
- Head coach: Len Stevens (1st season)
- Assistant coaches: Stu Jackson; Prescott "Puck" Smith
- Home arena: Beasley Coliseum

1983–84 Pacific-10 Conference men's basketball standings
	Conf.				Overall
Team	W		L	PCT	W		L	PCT
No. 15 Washington	15	–	3	.833	24	–	7	.774
No. 17 Oregon State	15	–	3	.833	22	–	7	.759
Oregon	11	–	7	.611	16	–	13	.552
UCLA	10	–	8	.556	17	–	11	.607
Stanford	8	–	10	.444	19	–	12	.613
Arizona State	8	–	10	.444	13	–	15	.464
Arizona	8	–	10	.444	11	–	17	.393
USC	6	–	12	.333	11	–	20	.355
California	5	–	13	.278	12	–	16	.429
Washington State	4	–	14	.222	10	–	18	.357
As of April 15, 1984; Rankings from AP Poll

The 1983–84 Washington State Cougars men's basketball team represented Washington State University for the 1983–84 NCAA Division I men's basketball season. Led by first-year head coach Len Stevens, the Cougars were members of the Pacific-10 Conference and played their home games on campus at Beasley Coliseum in Pullman, Washington.

The Cougars were 10–18 overall in the regular season and 4–14 in conference play, last in the standings. There was no conference tournament this season; it debuted three years later.

In early April 1983, Stevens was quickly promoted to head coach when George Raveling left Pullman for Iowa in the Big Ten. Prior to his two years as a Cougar assistant, Stevens was the head coach for three seasons at St. Martin's College in Lacey.

As they had two years earlier, WSU hosted the first two rounds in the West regional of the 53-team NCAA tournament at Beasley Coliseum. This was the third and most recent NCAA Tournament in Pullman; the Spokane Arena opened in 1995 and has hosted several times.

The court surface at Beasley Coliseum was tartan (polyurethane) for its first decade; a traditional hardwood floor debuted at the start of this season.
