= San Diego Toreros men's basketball =

American college basketball team in California

2026–27 San Diego Toreros men's basketball team
- University: University of San Diego
- Head coach: JR Blount (1st season)
- Location: San Diego, California
- Arena: Jenny Craig Pavilion (capacity: 5,100)
- Conference: West Coast Conference
- Nickname: Toreros
- Colors: Navy, white, and Toreros blue

NCAA Division I tournament Elite Eight
- 1978*
Other NCAA Division I tournament results
Sweet Sixteen	1978*
Appearances	1966*, 1973*, 1974*, 1978*, 1979*, 1984, 1987, 2003, 2008

Conference tournament champions
- 2003, 2008

Conference regular-season champions
- 1984, 1987

Uniforms
Home	Away
- * at Division II level

For information on all University of San Diego sports, see San Diego Toreros

The San Diego Toreros men's basketball team is the men's college basketball program that represents the University of San Diego (USD). The Toreros compete in NCAA Division I as a member of the West Coast Conference (WCC). The team plays its home games at the Jenny Craig Pavilion.

The Toreros won their first WCC title in 1983–84, when the conference was known as the West Coast Athletic Conference. Jim Brovelli was named the conference coach of the year. The team played in the NCAA Division I men's basketball tournament in 2008.

== Rivalries ==
University of San Diego's biggest rival is cross town, out of conference, San Diego State University. USD trails 14-23 all-time with both programs at the Division I level. Since the 2001–02 season the Toreros have been 3–15 against the Aztecs, but led the series 10–9 prior to that. As of the 2022–23 season, the last Toreros win came during the 2018–19 season at SDSU. They also won against them during a game at Petco Park during the 2015–16 season, at the time the fifth game since 2011 to be played outside; it was also the first time Petco Park hosted a basketball game. The Toreros won 53–48.

== College admissions scandal ==
Lamont Smith, who coached the team from 2015 to 2018, was accused of accepting a bribe as part of the 2019 college admissions bribery scandal while he was coach of the team, allegedly illegally helping a Beverly Hills real estate developer's children gain admission to the university.

== Postseason results ==
=== NCAA Division I ===
The Toreros have appeared in four NCAA Division I Tournaments. Their combined record is 1–4.

Year	Seed	Round	Opponent	Result
1984	12	Preliminary Round	(12) Princeton	L 56–65
1987	9	First Round	(8) Auburn	L 61–62
2003	13	First Round	(4) Stanford	L 69–77
2008	13	First Round; Second Round	(4) Connecticut (12) Western Kentucky	W 70–69^{OT} L 63–72

=== NCAA Division II ===
The Toreros appeared in five NCAA Division II Tournaments. Their combined record was 4–6.

Year	Round	Opponent	Result
1966	Regional Semifinals; Regional Third Place	Seattle Pacific; Nevada	L 63–69; L 71–74
1973	Regional Semifinals; Regional Third Place	Cal State Bakersfield; Puget Sound	L 44–50; W 80–73
1974	Round of 44	Sonoma State	L 54–60
1978	Regional Semifinals; Regional Finals; Elite Eight	Puget Sound; Cal State Northridge; Florida Tech	W 91–85; W 70–67; L 71–77
1979	Regional Semifinals; Regional Third Place	UC Riverside; Cal State Northridge	L 48–62; W 74–69 (OT)

=== NIT results ===
The Toreros have appeared in the National Invitation Tournament (NIT) once, in 2019.

Year	Round	Opponent	Result
2019	First Round	Memphis	L 60–74

=== CIT results ===
The Toreros have appeared in the CollegeInsider.com Postseason Tournament (CIT) two times. Their combined record is 4–2.

Year	Round	Opponent	Result
2014	First Round; Second Round; Quarterfinals	Portland State; Sam Houston State; Pacific	W 87–65; W 77–72; L 60–75
2018	First Round; Second Round; Quarterfinals	Hartford; Portland State; Northern Colorado	W 88–72; W 67–64; L 75–86

== Record by coach ==
Data at conclusion of 2021–22 WCC tournament
Coach	Years	Seasons	Won	Lost	Pct.	Conference Titles	NCAA¹	NIT¹	CIT¹
Fon Johnson	1955–1957	2	24	31	.436	0	0	0	0
Bob McCutcheon	1957–1958	1	14	11	.560	0	0	0	0
Les Harvey	1958–1960	2	15	36	.294	0	0	0	0
Ken Leslie	1960–1961	1	11	16	.407	0	0	0	0
Ed Baron	1961–1962	1	6	20	.231	0	0	0	0
Phil Woolpert	1962–1969	7	90	90	.500	0	0	0	0
Bernie Bickerstaff	1969–1973	4	55	49	.529	0	0	0	0
Jim Brovelli	1973–1984	11	160	131	.550	1	1	0	0
Hank Egan	1984–1994	10	156	126	.553	1	1	0	0
Brad Holland	1994–2007	13	200	176	.532	1	1	0	0
Bill Grier	2007–2015	8	117	144	.448	1	1	0	1
Lamont Smith	2015–2018	3	40	52	.435	0	0	0	0
Sam Scholl	2018–2022	4	50	66	.431	0	0	1	1
Steve Lavin	2022-present	3	35	52	.402	0	0	0	0
Totals		66	973	1000	(.493)				

¹ Invitations

== Results by Season, Last 12 Years ==
2024–2025 (6-27) (2-16 Conference)
2023–2024 (18-15) (7-9 Conference)
2022–2023 (11-20) (4–12 Conference)
2021–2022 (15-16) (7–9 Conference)
2020–2021 (3-11) (2-7 Conference)
2018–2019 (21–14) (7–9 Conference)
2017–2018 (20–14) (9–9 Conference)
2016–2017 (13–18) (6–12 Conference)
2015–2016 (9–21) (4–14 Conference)
2014–2015 (15–16) (8–10 Conference)
2013–2014 (18–17) (7–11 Conference)
2012–2013 (16–18) (7–9 Conference)

== Toreros in the NBA ==
- Stan Washington
- Eric Musselman
- Mike Brown
- Bernie Bickerstaff
- David Fizdale
- James Borrego
- Chris Grant
