= 1983–84 NCAA Division I men's basketball season =

Basketball season

- Preseason AP No. 1: North Carolina Tar Heels
- NCAA Tournament: 1984
- Tournament dates: March 13 – April 2, 1984
- National Championship: Kingdome; Seattle, Washington
- NCAA Champions: Georgetown Hoyas
- Other champions: Michigan Wolverines (NIT)
- Player of the Year (Naismith, Wooden): Michael Jordan, North Carolina Tar Heels

The 1983–84 NCAA Division I men's basketball season began in November 1983 and ended with the Final Four in Seattle, Washington on April 2, 1984. The Georgetown Hoyas won their first NCAA national championship with an 84–75 victory over the Houston Cougars, who were making their third consecutive appearance in the Final Four.

== Season headlines ==
- The NCAA implemented a significant change in Division I statistical recordkeeping, officially recording individual assists for the first time since the 1951–52 season.
- Under head coach John Thompson, Georgetown defeated Houston 84–75 to win the NCAA tournament, giving Georgetown its first national championship. Thompson became the first African-American head coach to win the NCAA championship.
- The NCAA Tournament expanded from 52 to 53 teams. The 53-team 1984 NCAA Tournament was the last to be contested with fewer than 64 teams.
- For the first time, the NCAA presented awards to all teams participating in the NCAA tournament.
- The National Invitation Tournament (NIT) restored its third-place game between the teams which lost in the semifinals. The third-place game previously had been part of the NIT from 1938 through 1981.

== Major rule changes ==
Beginning in 1983–84, the following rules changes were implemented:

- If a team was in the bonus situation within the last two minutes of the game and all of overtime, common fouls resulted in two free throws. This rule was changed back to the one-and-one free throw situation after a month due to its unpopularity.
- Several conferences were granted permission to experiment with a 45-second shot clock (either for the entire game or shut off in the last 4:00 of the second half) the three-point shot from 19 feet, and coaching boxes to limit coaches to their bench areas.

== Season outlook ==
=== Pre-season polls ===
The top 20 from the AP Poll during the pre-season.

Associated Press
Ranking	Team
1	North Carolina
2	Kentucky
3	Houston
4	Georgetown
5	Memphis State
6	Louisville
7	Iowa
8	Maryland
9	UCLA
10	Oregon State
11	LSU
12	Michigan State
13	Fresno State
14	Arkansas
15	Boston College
16	Georgia
17	Kansas
18	DePaul
19	Indiana
20	Oklahoma

== Conference membership changes ==
School	Former conference	New conference
Baltimore Super Bees	ECAC Metro Conference	Discontinued athletic programs
Eastern Washington Eagles	Division II independent	Division I independent
Holy Cross Crusaders	ECAC North Conference	Metro Atlantic Athletic Conference
Monmouth Hawks	Big Apple Conference (Division II)	Division I independent
La Salle Explorers	East Coast Conference	Metro Atlantic Athletic Conference
New Mexico State Aggies	Missouri Valley Conference	Pacific Coast Athletic Association
South Carolina Gamecocks	Division I independent	Metro Conference

== Regular season ==
=== Conferences ===
==== Conference winners and tournaments ====
Conference	Regular season winner	Conference player of the year	Conference Coach of the Year	Conference tournament	Tournament venue (City)	Tournament winner
AMCU–8	Illinois–Chicago	Craig Lathen, Illinois–Chicago	Willie Little, Illinois–Chicago & Charlie Spoonhour, Southwest Missouri State	1984 AMCU-8 men's basketball tournament	Hammons Student Center (Springfield, Missouri)	Western Illinois
Atlantic 10 Conference	Temple	Terence Stansbury, Temple	John Chaney, Temple	1984 Atlantic 10 men's basketball tournament	WVU Coliseum (Morgantown, West Virginia)	West Virginia
Atlantic Coast Conference	North Carolina	Michael Jordan, North Carolina	Mike Krzyzewski, Duke	1984 ACC men's basketball tournament	Greensboro Coliseum (Greensboro, North Carolina)	Maryland
Big East Conference	Georgetown	Patrick Ewing, Georgetown & Chris Mullin, St. John's	Jim Boeheim, Syracuse	1984 Big East men's basketball tournament	Madison Square Garden (New York City, New York)	Georgetown
Big Eight Conference	Oklahoma	Wayman Tisdale, Oklahoma	Billy Tubbs, Oklahoma	1984 Big Eight Conference men's basketball tournament	Kemper Arena (Kansas City, Missouri) (Semifinals and Finals)	Kansas
Big Sky Conference	Weber State	Larry Krystkowiak, Montana	Sonny Allen, Nevada–Reno	1984 Big Sky Conference men's basketball tournament	Dee Events Center (Ogden, Utah)	Nevada–Reno
Big Ten Conference	Illinois & Purdue	None Selected	Gene Keady, Purdue	No Tournament		
East Coast Conference	Bucknell	Richard Congo, Drexel	Charlie Woollum, Bucknell	1984 East Coast Conference men's basketball tournament	Towson Center (Towson, Maryland)	Rider
ECAC Metro	Long Island & Robert Morris	Chipper Harris, Robert Morris, Robert Jackson, St. Francis (NY) & Carey Scurry, Long Island	Mark Amatucci, Loyola (MD)	1984 ECAC Metro men's basketball tournament	McCann Arena (Poughkeepsie, New York)	Long Island
ECAC North	Northeastern	Mark Halsel, Northeastern	Nick Macarchuk, Canisius	1984 ECAC North men's basketball tournament	Matthews Arena (Boston, Massachusetts)	Northeastern
ECAC South	Richmond	Johnny Newman, Richmond	Dick Tarrant, Richmond	1984 ECAC South men's basketball tournament	JMU Convocation Center (Harrisonburg, Virginia)	Richmond
Ivy League	Princeton	Joe Carrabino, Harvard	None selected	No Tournament		
Metro Atlantic Athletic Conference	Iona, St. Peter's & La Salle	Steve Burtt, Iona	Pat Kennedy, Iona	1984 MAAC men's basketball tournament	Meadowlands Arena (East Rutherford, New Jersey)	Iona
Metro Conference	Memphis State & Louisville	John Williams, Tulane	Dana Kirk, Memphis State	1984 Metro Conference men's basketball tournament	Mid-South Coliseum (Memphis, Tennessee)	Memphis State
Mid-American Conference	Miami (OH)	John Devereaux, Ohio	Darrell Hedric, Miami (OH)	1984 MAC men's basketball tournament	Rockford MetroCentre (Rockford, Illinois)	Miami (OH)
Mid-Eastern Athletic Conference	North Carolina A&T	Joe Binion, North Carolina A&T	Don Corbett, North Carolina A&T	1984 MEAC men's basketball tournament	Greensboro Coliseum (Greensboro, North Carolina)	North Carolina A&T
Midwestern City Conference	Oral Roberts	Alfredrick Hughes, Loyola (IL)	Joe Sexson, Butler & Dick Acres, Oral Roberts	1984 Midwestern City Conference men's basketball tournament	UIC Pavilion (Chicago, Illinois)	Oral Roberts
Missouri Valley Conference	Illinois State & Tulsa	Xavier McDaniel, Wichita State	Bob Donewald, Illinois State	1984 Missouri Valley Conference men's basketball tournament	Tulsa Convention Center (Tulsa, Oklahoma)	Tulsa
Ohio Valley Conference	Morehead State	Joe Jakubick, Akron	Wayne Martin, Morehead State	1984 Ohio Valley Conference men's basketball tournament	E. A. Diddle Arena (Bowling Green, Kentucky)	Middle Tennessee State
Pacific-10 Conference	Oregon State & Washington	A.C. Green, Oregon State	Marv Harshman, Washington	No Tournament		
Pacific Coast Athletic Association	UNLV	Richie Adams, UNLV	Jerry Tarkanian, UNLV	1984 Pacific Coast Athletic Association men's basketball tournament	The Forum (Inglewood, California)	Fresno State
Southeastern Conference	Kentucky	Charles Barkley, Auburn	Sonny Smith, Auburn	1984 SEC men's basketball tournament	Memorial Gymnasium (Nashville, Tennessee)	Kentucky
Southern Conference	Marshall	Regan Truesdale, The Citadel	Rick Huckabay, Marshall	1984 Southern Conference men's basketball tournament	Asheville Civic Center (Asheville, North Carolina)	Marshall
Southland Conference	Lamar	Tom Sewell, Lamar	Pat Foster, Lamar	1984 Southland Conference men's basketball tournament	Beaumont Civic Center (Beaumont, Texas)	Louisiana Tech
Southwest Conference	Houston	Akeem Olajuwon, Houston	Guy Lewis, Houston	1984 Southwest Conference men's basketball tournament	The Summit (Houston, Texas)	Houston
Southwestern Athletic Conference	Alabama State & Alcorn State	Lewis Jackson, Alabama State	James Oliver, Alabama State	1984 SWAC men's basketball tournament	Mississippi Coliseum (Jackson, Mississippi)	Alcorn State
Sun Belt Conference	VCU	Terry Catledge, South Alabama	J. D. Barnett, VCU	198 Sun Belt Conference men's basketball tournament	Birmingham-Jefferson Convention Complex (Birmingham, Alabama)	UAB
Trans America Athletic Conference	Houston Baptist	Willie Jackson, Centenary	Mike Hanks, Samford	1984 TAAC men's basketball tournament	Don Coleman Coliseum (Houston, Texas)	Houston Baptist
West Coast Athletic Conference	San Diego	John Stockton, Gonzaga	Jim Brovelli, San Diego	No Tournament		
Western Athletic Conference	UTEP	Michael Cage, San Diego State	Gary Colson, New Mexico	1984 WAC men's basketball tournament	Special Events Center (El Paso, Texas)	UTEP

==== Conference standings ====
1983–84 AMCU-8 Conference men's basketball standings
	Conf.				Overall
Team	W		L	PCT	W		L	PCT
Illinois–Chicago	12	–	2	.857	22	–	7	.759
Northern Iowa	10	–	4	.714	18	–	10	.643
Southwest Missouri State	9	–	5	.643	18	–	10	.643
Eastern Illinois	7	–	7	.500	15	–	13	.536
Western Illinois †	6	–	8	.429	17	–	13	.567
Wisconsin–Green Bay	5	–	9	.357	9	–	19	.321
Cleveland State	4	–	10	.286	14	–	16	.467
Valparaiso	3	–	11	.214	9	–	19	.321
† 1984 AMCU-8 tournament winner Rankings from AP Poll

1983–84 Atlantic 10 men's basketball standings
	Conf.				Overall
Team	W		L	PCT	W		L	PCT
No. 20 Temple	18	–	0	1.000	26	–	5	.839
Saint Joseph's	13	–	5	.722	20	–	9	.690
George Washington	11	–	7	.611	17	–	12	.586
West Virginia †	9	–	9	.500	20	–	12	.625
Rutgers	9	–	9	.500	15	–	13	.536
St. Bonaventure	8	–	10	.444	18	–	13	.581
Duquesne	8	–	10	.444	10	–	18	.357
UMass	6	–	12	.333	12	–	17	.414
Rhode Island	5	–	13	.278	6	–	22	.214
Penn State	3	–	15	.167	5	–	22	.185
† 1984 Atlantic 10 Tournament winner Rankings from AP Poll

1983–84 ACC men's basketball standings
	Conf.				Overall
Team	W		L	PCT	W		L	PCT
No. 1 North Carolina	14	–	0	1.000	28	–	3	.903
No. 11 Maryland †	9	–	5	.643	24	–	8	.750
No. 19 Wake Forest	7	–	7	.500	23	–	9	.719
No. 14 Duke	7	–	7	.500	24	–	10	.706
Georgia Tech	6	–	8	.429	18	–	11	.621
Virginia	6	–	8	.429	21	–	12	.636
NC State	4	–	10	.286	19	–	14	.576
Clemson	3	–	11	.214	14	–	14	.500
† 1984 ACC tournament winner Rankings from AP Poll

1983–84 Big East men's basketball standings
	Conf.				Overall
Team	W		L	PCT	W		L	PCT
No. 2 Georgetown†	14	–	2	.875	34	–	3	.919
No. 18 Syracuse	12	–	4	.750	23	–	9	.719
Villanova	12	–	4	.750	19	–	12	.613
Boston College	8	–	8	.500	18	–	12	.600
St. John's	8	–	8	.500	18	–	12	.600
Pittsburgh	6	–	10	.375	18	–	13	.581
Connecticut	5	–	11	.313	13	–	15	.464
Providence	5	–	11	.313	15	–	14	.517
Seton Hall	2	–	14	.125	9	–	19	.321
† 1984 Big East tournament winner As of April 2, 1984; Rankings from AP Poll

1983–84 Big Eight Conference men's basketball standings
	Conf.				Overall
Team	W		L	PCT	W		L	PCT
No. 7 Oklahoma	13	–	1	.929	29	–	5	.853
Kansas †	9	–	5	.643	22	–	10	.688
Nebraska	7	–	7	.500	18	–	12	.600
Iowa State	6	–	8	.429	16	–	13	.552
Colorado	6	–	8	.429	16	–	13	.552
Kansas State	5	–	9	.357	14	–	15	.483
Oklahoma State	5	–	9	.357	13	–	15	.464
Missouri	5	–	9	.357	16	–	14	.533
† 1984 Big Eight tournament winner Rankings from AP Poll

1983–84 Big Sky men's basketball standings
	Conf.				Overall
Team	W		L	PCT	W		L	PCT
Weber State	12	–	2	.857	23	–	8	.742
Montana	9	–	5	.643	23	–	7	.767
Montana State	7	–	7	.500	14	–	15	.483
Nevada †	7	–	7	.500	17	–	14	.548
Idaho State	6	–	8	.429	12	–	19	.387
Boise State	6	–	8	.429	15	–	12	.556
Northern Arizona	5	–	9	.357	13	–	14	.481
Idaho	4	–	10	.286	9	–	19	.321
† 1984 Big Sky tournament winner

1983–84 Big Ten Conference men's basketball standings
	Conf.				Overall
Team	W		L	PCT	W		L	PCT
No. 6 Illinois	15	–	3	.833	26	–	5	.839
No. 10 Purdue	15	–	3	.833	22	–	7	.759
Indiana	13	–	5	.722	22	–	9	.710
Michigan	10	–	8	.556	24	–	9	.727
Michigan State	8	–	10	.444	15	–	13	.536
Ohio State	8	–	10	.444	15	–	14	.517
Northwestern	5	–	13	.278	14	–	14	.500
Minnesota	6	–	12	.333	15	–	13	.536
Iowa	6	–	12	.333	13	–	15	.464
Wisconsin*	0	–	18	.000	0	–	28	.000
Rankings from AP Poll; *Wisconsin forfeited all games due to NCAA sanctions. Disputed record (4–14, 8–20)

1983–84 ECC men's basketball standings
	Conf.				Overall
Team	W		L	PCT	W		L	PCT
Bucknell	14	–	2	.875	24	–	5	.828
Rider †	11	–	5	.688	20	–	11	.645
Drexel	10	–	6	.625	17	–	12	.586
Lafayette	9	–	7	.563	12	–	17	.414
Hofstra	9	–	7	.563	14	–	14	.500
Delaware	6	–	10	.375	11	–	16	.407
American	5	–	11	.313	6	–	22	.214
Towson	5	–	11	.313	10	–	19	.345
Lehigh	3	–	13	.188	4	–	23	.148
† 1984 ECC tournament winner Rankings from AP poll

1983–84 ECAC Metro men's basketball standings
	Conf.				Overall
Team	W		L	PCT	W		L	PCT
Long Island †	11	–	5	.688	20	–	11	.645
Robert Morris	11	–	5	.688	17	–	13	.567
Fairleigh Dickinson	10	–	6	.625	17	–	12	.586
Loyola (MD)	10	–	6	.625	16	–	12	.571
Marist	8	–	8	.500	14	–	15	.483
Siena	8	–	8	.500	15	–	13	.536
Saint Francis (PA)	8	–	8	.500	12	–	15	.444
Wagner	5	–	11	.313	8	–	20	.286
St. Francis (NY)	1	–	15	.063	2	–	26	.071
† 1984 ECAC Metro tournament winner Rankings from AP Poll

1983–84 ECAC North men's basketball standings
	Conf.				Overall
Team	W		L	PCT	W		L	PCT
Northeastern †	14	–	0	1.000	27	–	5	.844
Canisius	9	–	5	.643	19	–	11	.633
Boston University	9	–	5	.643	16	–	13	.552
New Hampshire	8	–	6	.571	15	–	13	.536
Maine	7	–	7	.500	17	–	10	.630
Niagara	5	–	9	.357	10	–	18	.357
Vermont	3	–	11	.214	7	–	21	.250
Colgate	1	–	13	.071	5	–	22	.185
† 1984 ECAC North tournament winner

1983–84 ECAC South men's basketball standings
	Conf.				Overall
Team	W		L	PCT	W		L	PCT
Richmond †	7	–	3	.700	22	–	10	.688
Navy	6	–	4	.600	24	–	8	.750
William & Mary	6	–	4	.600	14	–	14	.500
George Mason	5	–	5	.500	21	–	7	.750
James Madison	5	–	5	.500	15	–	14	.517
East Carolina	1	–	9	.100	4	–	24	.143
† 1984 ECAC South tournament winner Rankings from AP Poll

1983–84 Ivy League men's basketball standings
	Conf.				Overall
Team	W		L	PCT	W		L	PCT
Princeton	10	–	4	.714	18	–	10	.643
Cornell	9	–	5	.643	16	–	10	.615
Harvard	9	–	5	.643	15	–	11	.577
Penn	7	–	7	.500	10	–	16	.385
Brown	6	–	8	.429	11	–	15	.423
Dartmouth	6	–	8	.429	11	–	15	.423
Columbia	5	–	9	.357	8	–	18	.308
Yale	4	–	10	.286	7	–	19	.269
Rankings from AP Poll

1983–84 Metro Conference men's basketball standings
	Conf.				Overall
Team	W		L	PCT	W		L	PCT
No. 16 Memphis State †	11	–	3	.786	26	–	7	.788
Louisville	11	–	3	.786	24	–	11	.686
Florida State	9	–	5	.643	20	–	11	.645
Virginia Tech	8	–	6	.571	22	–	13	.629
Tulane	7	–	7	.500	17	–	11	.607
South Carolina	5	–	9	.357	12	–	16	.429
Southern Miss	4	–	10	.286	13	–	15	.464
Cincinnati	0	–	14	.000	3	–	25	.107
† 1984 Metro Conference tournament winner Rankings from AP Poll

1983–84 MAAC men's basketball standings
	Conf.				Overall
Team	W		L	PCT	W		L	PCT
La Salle	11	–	3	.786	20	–	11	.645
Saint Peter's	11	–	3	.786	23	–	6	.793
Iona †	11	–	3	.786	23	–	8	.742
Fordham	7	–	7	.500	19	–	15	.559
Fairfield	5	–	9	.357	10	–	18	.357
Holy Cross	5	–	9	.357	12	–	18	.400
Army	4	–	10	.286	11	–	17	.393
Manhattan	2	–	12	.143	9	–	19	.321
† 1984 MAAC tournament winner Rankings from AP Poll

1983–84 Mid-American Conference men's basketball standings
	Conf.				Overall
Team	W		L	PCT	W		L	PCT
Miami†	16	–	2	.889	24	–	6	.800
Ohio	14	–	4	.778	20	–	8	.714
Bowling Green	11	–	7	.611	18	–	10	.643
Toledo	11	–	7	.611	18	–	11	.621
Northern Illinois	9	–	9	.500	12	–	15	.444
Eastern Michigan	8	–	10	.444	12	–	17	.414
Kent State	8	–	10	.444	15	–	14	.517
Central Michigan	6	–	12	.333	11	–	16	.407
Ball State	5	–	13	.278	8	–	19	.296
Western Michigan	2	–	16	.111	4	–	22	.154
† Mid-American Conference tournament winner Rankings from AP Poll

1983–84 MEAC men's basketball standings
	Conf.				Overall
Team	W		L	PCT	W		L	PCT
North Carolina A&T †	9	–	1	.900	22	–	7	.759
Howard	7	–	3	.700	14	–	13	.519
South Carolina State	6	–	4	.600	13	–	16	.448
Delaware State	3	–	7	.300	12	–	16	.429
Maryland Eastern Shore	3	–	7	.300	7	–	21	.250
Bethune–Cookman	2	–	8	.200	6	–	22	.214
Florida A&M		–		–	7	–	19	.269
† 1984 MEAC tournament winner Rankings from AP Poll

1983–84 Midwestern City Conference men's basketball standings
	Conf.				Overall
Team	W		L	PCT	W		L	PCT
Oral Roberts †	11	–	3	.786	21	–	10	.677
Loyola-Chicago	10	–	4	.714	20	–	9	.690
Xavier	9	–	5	.643	22	–	11	.667
Butler	7	–	7	.500	13	–	15	.464
Evansville	7	–	7	.500	15	–	14	.517
Saint Louis	5	–	9	.357	12	–	16	.429
Detroit	4	–	10	.286	8	–	20	.286
Oklahoma City	3	–	11	.214	8	–	19	.296
† 1984 MCC tournament winner

1983–84 Missouri Valley Conference men's basketball standings
	Conf.				Overall
Team	W		L	PCT	W		L	PCT
Illinois State	13	–	3	.813	23	–	8	.742
No. 12 Tulsa †	13	–	3	.813	27	–	4	.871
Wichita State	11	–	5	.688	18	–	12	.600
Creighton	8	–	8	.500	17	–	14	.548
Bradley	7	–	9	.438	15	–	13	.536
Southern Illinois	7	–	9	.438	15	–	13	.536
Indiana State	6	–	10	.375	14	–	14	.500
Drake	4	–	12	.250	8	–	20	.286
West Texas State	3	–	13	.188	8	–	19	.296
† 1984 MVC tournament winner Rankings from AP Poll

1983–84 Ohio Valley Conference men's basketball standings
	Conf.				Overall
Team	W		L	PCT	W		L	PCT
Morehead State †	12	–	2	.857	25	–	6	.806
Tennessee Tech	11	–	3	.786	18	–	10	.643
Youngstown State	9	–	5	.643	18	–	11	.621
Murray State	7	–	7	.500	15	–	13	.536
Austin Peay	5	–	9	.357	11	–	16	.407
Eastern Kentucky	5	–	9	.357	11	–	16	.407
Middle Tennessee	4	–	10	.286	11	–	16	.407
Akron	3	–	11	.214	8	–	19	.296
† 1984 OVC tournament winner Rankings from AP Poll

1983–84 Pacific Coast Athletic Association men's basketball standings
	Conf.				Overall
Team	W		L	PCT	W		L	PCT
No. 13 UNLV	16	–	2	.889	29	–	6	.829
UC Irvine	14	–	4	.778	19	–	10	.655
Fresno State†	13	–	5	.722	25	–	8	.758
Utah State	12	–	6	.667	19	–	11	.633
New Mexico State	9	–	9	.500	13	–	15	.464
Cal State Fullerton	8	–	10	.444	17	–	13	.567
San Jose State	6	–	12	.333	10	–	18	.357
Long Beach State	6	–	12	.333	9	–	19	.321
UC Santa Barbara	5	–	13	.278	10	–	17	.370
Pacific	1	–	17	.056	3	–	27	.100
† 1984 PCAA tournament winner

1983–84 Pacific-10 Conference men's basketball standings
	Conf.				Overall
Team	W		L	PCT	W		L	PCT
No. 15 Washington	15	–	3	.833	24	–	7	.774
No. 17 Oregon State	15	–	3	.833	22	–	7	.759
Oregon	11	–	7	.611	16	–	13	.552
UCLA	10	–	8	.556	17	–	11	.607
Stanford	8	–	10	.444	19	–	12	.613
Arizona State	8	–	10	.444	13	–	15	.464
Arizona	8	–	10	.444	11	–	17	.393
USC	6	–	12	.333	11	–	20	.355
California	5	–	13	.278	12	–	16	.429
Washington State	4	–	14	.222	10	–	18	.357
As of April 15, 1984; Rankings from AP Poll

1983–84 Southeastern Conference men's basketball standings
	Conf.				Overall
Team	W		L	PCT	W		L	PCT
No. 3 Kentucky †	14	–	4	.778	29	–	5	.853
Auburn	12	–	6	.667	20	–	11	.645
Florida	11	–	7	.611	16	–	13	.552
LSU	11	–	7	.611	18	–	11	.621
Alabama	10	–	8	.556	18	–	12	.600
Tennessee	9	–	9	.500	21	–	14	.600
Vanderbilt	8	–	10	.444	14	–	15	.483
Georgia	8	–	10	.444	17	–	13	.567
Mississippi State	4	–	14	.222	9	–	19	.321
Ole Miss	3	–	15	.167	8	–	20	.286
† 1984 SEC tournament winner Rankings from AP Poll

1983–84 Southern Conference men's basketball standings
	Conf.				Overall
Team	W		L	PCT	W		L	PCT
Marshall†	13	–	3	.813	25	–	6	.806
Chattanooga	12	–	4	.750	24	–	7	.774
Western Carolina	9	–	7	.563	15	–	13	.536
Appalachian State	8	–	8	.500	13	–	16	.448
The Citadel	8	–	8	.500	14	–	14	.500
Furman	7	–	9	.438	12	–	17	.414
East Tennessee State	6	–	10	.375	9	–	19	.321
Davidson	5	–	11	.313	9	–	19	.321
VMI	4	–	12	.250	8	–	19	.296
† Tournament winner As of April 30, 1984; Rankings from AP poll

1983–84 Southland Conference men's basketball standings
	Conf.				Overall
Team	W		L	PCT	W		L	PCT
Lamar	11	–	1	.917	26	–	5	.839
Northeast Louisiana	9	–	3	.750	17	–	12	.586
Louisiana Tech †	8	–	4	.667	26	–	7	.788
McNeese State	6	–	6	.500	16	–	15	.516
Arkansas State	4	–	8	.333	13	–	15	.464
North Texas	3	–	9	.250	9	–	19	.321
Texas-Arlington	1	–	11	.083	5	–	23	.179
† 1984 Southland tournament winner Rankings from AP poll

1983–84 Southwest Conference men's basketball standings
	Conf.				Overall
Team	W		L	PCT	W		L	PCT
No. 5 Houston †	15	–	1	.938	32	–	5	.865
No. 8 Arkansas	14	–	2	.875	25	–	7	.781
SMU	12	–	4	.750	25	–	8	.758
Texas Tech	10	–	6	.625	17	–	12	.586
Texas A&M	7	–	9	.438	16	–	14	.533
Rice	6	–	10	.375	13	–	17	.433
TCU	4	–	12	.250	11	–	17	.393
Texas	3	–	13	.188	7	–	21	.250
Baylor	1	–	15	.063	5	–	23	.179
† 1984 SWC tournament winner Rankings from AP poll

1983–84 SWAC men's basketball standings
	Conf.				Overall
Team	W		L	PCT	W		L	PCT
Alcorn State †	11	–	3	.786	21	–	10	.677
Alabama State	11	–	3	.786	22	–	6	.786
Southern	10	–	4	.714	16	–	12	.571
Grambling State	7	–	7	.500	17	–	12	.586
Mississippi Valley State	6	–	8	.429	15	–	13	.536
Texas Southern	6	–	8	.429	12	–	17	.414
Jackson State	5	–	9	.357	10	–	18	.357
Prairie View A&M	0	–	14	.000	2	–	26	.071
† 1984 SWAC tournament winner Rankings from AP Poll

1983–84 Sun Belt Conference men's basketball standings
	Conf.				Overall
Team	W		L	PCT	W		L	PCT
VCU	11	–	3	.786	23	–	7	.767
Old Dominion	9	–	5	.643	19	–	12	.613
South Florida	9	–	5	.643	17	–	11	.607
South Alabama	9	–	5	.643	22	–	8	.733
UAB †	8	–	6	.571	23	–	11	.676
Western Kentucky	5	–	9	.357	12	–	17	.414
Jacksonville	3	–	11	.214	12	–	16	.429
UNC Charlotte	2	–	12	.143	9	–	19	.321
† 1984 Sun Belt Conference tournament winner Rankings from AP Poll

1983–84 Trans America Athletic Conference men's basketball standings
	Conf.				Overall
Team	W		L	PCT	W		L	PCT
Houston Baptist †	11	–	3	.786	24	–	7	.774
Samford	10	–	4	.714	22	–	8	.733
Georgia Southern	8	–	6	.571	16	–	12	.571
Arkansas–Little Rock	7	–	7	.500	14	–	15	.483
Centenary	7	–	7	.500	12	–	16	.429
Mercer	6	–	8	.429	14	–	14	.500
Hardin–Simmons	5	–	9	.357	9	–	22	.290
Northwestern State	2	–	12	.143	6	–	22	.214
Nicholls State*	0	–	0	–	19	–	7	.731
† 1984 TAAC tournament winner *Provisional member; played no conference games. Rankings from AP Poll

1983–84 West Coast Athletic Conference men's basketball standings
	Conf.				Overall
Team	W		L	PCT	W		L	PCT
San Diego	9	–	3	.750	18	–	10	.643
Santa Clara	7	–	5	.583	22	–	10	.688
Saint Mary's	7	–	5	.583	12	–	16	.429
Gonzaga	6	–	6	.500	17	–	10	.630
Pepperdine	6	–	6	.500	15	–	13	.536
Loyola Marymount	5	–	7	.417	12	–	15	.444
Portland	2	–	10	.167	11	–	17	.393
Rankings from AP Poll

1983–84 WAC men's basketball standings
	Conf.				Overall
Team	W		L	PCT	W		L	PCT
No. 9 UTEP †	13	–	3	.813	27	–	4	.871
BYU	12	–	4	.750	20	–	11	.645
New Mexico	10	–	6	.625	24	–	11	.686
Wyoming	9	–	7	.563	17	–	13	.567
Colorado State	9	–	7	.563	16	–	14	.533
Hawaii	6	–	10	.375	12	–	16	.429
San Diego State	6	–	10	.375	15	–	13	.536
Utah	4	–	12	.250	11	–	19	.367
Air Force	3	–	13	.188	8	–	19	.296
† 1984 WAC tournament winner Rankings from AP poll

=== Division I independents ===
A total of 20 college teams played as Division I independents. Among them, DePaul (27–3) had both the best winning percentage (.900) and the most wins.

1983–84 NCAA Division I men's basketball independents standings
	Conf.				Overall
Team	W		L	PCT	W		L	PCT
No. 4 DePaul		–		–	27	–	3	.900
UTSA		–		–	20	–	8	.714
Southwestern Louisiana		–		–	23	–	10	.697
Stetson		–		–	19	–	9	.679
Dayton		–		–	21	–	11	.656
Notre Dame		–		–	21	–	12	.636
Marquette		–		–	17	–	13	.567
Baptist		–		–	15	–	13	.536
New Orleans		–		–	14	–	14	.500
Texas–Pan American		–		–	13	–	14	.481
Tennessee State		–		–	12	–	15	.444
Utica		–		–	11	–	15	.423
Southeastern Louisiana		–		–	11	–	17	.393
UNC Wilmington		–		–	11	–	17	.393
Campbell		–		–	10	–	18	.357
Brooklyn		–		–	8	–	20	.286
Monmouth		–		–	6	–	21	.222
Georgia State		–		–	6	–	22	.214
Eastern Washington		–		–	4	–	22	.154
U.S. International		–		–	2	–	26	.071
Rankings from AP Poll

=== Informal championships ===
Conference	Regular season winner	Most Valuable Player
Philadelphia Big 5	La Salle & Temple	Ralph Lewis, La Salle

La Salle and Temple both finished with 3–1 records in head-to-head competition among the Philadelphia Big 5.

=== Statistical leaders ===
Points per game			Rebounds per game			Assists per game			Field-goal percentage		
Player	School	PPG	Player	School	RPG	Player	School	APG	Player	School	FG%
Joe Jakubick	Akron	30.1	Akeem Olajuwon	Houston	13.5	Craig Lathen	UIC	9.4	Akeem Olajuwon	Houston	67.5
Lewis Jackson	Alabama St.	29.0	Carey Scurry	Long Island	13.5	Danny Tarkanian	UNLV	8.5	Bobby Lee Hurt	Alabama	66.4
Devin Durrant	BYU	27.9	Xavier McDaniel	Wichita St.	13.1	Reid Gettys	Houston	8.4	Keith Walker	Utica	66.0
Alfredrick Hughes	Loyola (IL)	27.6	Donald Newman	Ark.–Little Rock	12.9	Andre LaFleur	Northeastern	7.9	Patrick Ewing	Georgetown	65.8
Wayman Tisdale	Oklahoma	27.0	Michael Cage	San Diego St.	12.6	Tony William	Florida St.	7.7	A.C. Green	Oregon St.	65.7
			Jeff Cross	Maine	12.6						

Free-throw percentage
Player	School	FT%
Steve Alford	Indiana	91.3
Joe Carrabino	Harvard	90.5
Chris Mullin	St. John's	90.4
Bob Ferry	Harvard	90.3
Vince Cunningham	UTSA	87.9

== Postseason tournaments ==
=== NCAA tournament ===
==== Final Four - Kingdome, Seattle, Washington ====
National semifinals
E7	Virginia	47*
MW2	Houston	49
ME1	Kentucky	40
W1	Georgetown	53

National championship game
W1	Georgetown	84
MW2	Houston	75

=== National Invitation tournament ===
==== NIT Semifinals and Final ====
Semifinals
Southwestern Louisiana	59
Notre Dame	65
Michigan	78
Virginia Tech	75

Finals
Notre Dame	63
Michigan	83

Third place game
Southwestern Louisiana	70
Virginia Tech	71

== Award winners ==
=== Consensus All-American teams ===
Consensus First Team
Player	Position	Class	Team
Patrick Ewing	C	Junior	Georgetown
Michael Jordan	G	Junior	North Carolina
Akeem Olajuwon	C	Junior	Houston
Sam Perkins	F	Senior	North Carolina
Wayman Tisdale	F	Sophomore	Oklahoma

Consensus Second Team
Player	Position	Class	Team
Michael Cage	F	Senior	San Diego State
Devin Durrant	F	Senior	Brigham Young
Keith Lee	F/C	Junior	Memphis State
Chris Mullin	F/G	Junior	St. John's
Melvin Turpin	C/F	Senior	Kentucky
Leon Wood	G	Senior	Cal State Fullerton

=== Major player of the year awards ===
- Wooden Award: Michael Jordan, North Carolina
- Naismith Award: Michael Jordan, North Carolina
- Associated Press Player of the Year: Michael Jordan, North Carolina
- UPI Player of the Year: Michael Jordan, North Carolina
- NABC Player of the Year: Michael Jordan, North Carolina
- Oscar Robertson Trophy (USBWA): Michael Jordan, North Carolina
- Adolph Rupp Trophy: Michael Jordan, North Carolina
- Sporting News Player of the Year: Michael Jordan, North Carolina

=== Major coach of the year awards ===
- Associated Press Coach of the Year: Ray Meyer, DePaul
- UPI Coach of the Year: Ray Meyer, DePaul
- Henry Iba Award (USBWA): Gene Keady, Purdue
- NABC Coach of the Year: Marv Harshman, Washington
- CBS/Chevrolet Coach of the Year: Gene Keady, Purdue
- Sporting News Coach of the Year: John Thompson, Georgetown

=== Other major awards ===
- Frances Pomeroy Naismith Award (Best player under 6'0): Ricky Stokes, Virginia
- Robert V. Geasey Trophy (Top player in Philadelphia Big 5): Ralph Lewis, La Salle
- NIT/Haggerty Award (Top player in New York City metro are): Chris Mullin, St. John's and Steve Burtt, Iona

== Coaching changes ==
A number of teams changed coaches during the season and after it ended.

Team	Former Coach	Interim Coach	New Coach	Reason
Air Force	Hank Egan		Reggie Minton	Minton left Dartmouth after one season to take over coaching duties.
Akron	Bob Rupert		Bob Huggins	Huggins was hired from the UCF coaching staff.
Arkansas State	Marin Adams		Nelson Catalina	
Arkansas–Little Rock	Ron Kestenbaum		Mike Newell	
Clemson	Bill Foster		Cliff Ellis	Foster left to restart the basketball program at Miami. Ellis was hired from South Alabama after 9 seasons going 171–84.
Columbia	Buddy Mahar		Wayne Szoke	After being fired, Mahar joined the Fordham coaching staff.
Dartmouth	Reggie Minton		Paul Cormier	Minton left to coach Air Force.
DePaul	Ray Meyer		Joey Meyer	
Florida A&M	Anthony Fields		Willie Booker	
Lafayette	Will Rackley		Butch van Breda Kolff	
Long Beach State	Dave Buss		Ron Palmer	
Marist	Ron Petro		Matt Furjanic	
Miami (OH)	Darrell Hedric		Jerry Peirson	Hedric left to become the associate athletic director at Miami (OH).
Middle Tennessee	Stan Simpson		Bruce Stewart	
Rhode Island	Claude English		Brendan Malone	English left to coach and be the athletic director at Park University. Malone was hired from the Syracuse coaching staff.
Robert Morris	Matt Furjanic		Jarrett Durham	Furjanic left to coach Marist. Durham was an assistant under Furjanic, he was promoted to head coach.
Samford	Mike Hanks		Mel Hankinson	Hanks left to coach South Alabama.
Southeastern Louisiana	Ken Fortenberry		Newton Chelette	
South Alabama	Cliff Ellis		Mike Hanks	
Southern	Andy Stoglin		Bob Hopkins	
St. Francis (NY)	Gene Roberti		Bob Valvano	
UCLA	Larry Farmer		Walt Hazzard	
San Diego	Jim Brovelli		Han Egan	
West Texas A&M	Ken Edwards		Gary Moss	
