= 1983–84 NCAA Division I men's basketball rankings =

- Season: 1983–84
- NCAA Tournament: 1984
- Preseason No. 1: North Carolina
- NCAA Tournament Champions: Georgetown
NCAA Division I men's basketball rankings


The 1983–84 NCAA Division I men's basketball rankings was made up of two human polls, the AP Poll and the Coaches Poll, in addition to various other preseason polls.

== Legend ==
	Increase in ranking
	Decrease in ranking
	New to rankings from previous week
Italics	Number of first place votes
(#–#)	Win–loss record
т	Tied with team above or below also with this symbol

== AP Poll ==
	Preseason	Week 1 Nov. 28	Week 2 Dec. 5	Week 3 Dec. 12	Week 4 Dec. 19	Week 5 Dec. 26	Week 6 Jan. 2	Week 7 Jan. 9	Week 8 Jan. 16	Week 9 Jan. 23	Week 10 Jan. 30	Week 11 Feb. 6	Week 12 Feb. 13	Week 13 Feb. 20	Week 14 Feb. 27	Week 15 Mar. 5	Final Mar. 12	
1.	North Carolina	Kentucky (1–0)	North Carolina (4–0)	North Carolina (5–0)	North Carolina (5–0) (36)	North Carolina (6–0)	North Carolina (8–0)	North Carolina (10–0)	North Carolina (12–0)	North Carolina (14–0)	North Carolina (17–0)	North Carolina (20–0)	North Carolina (21–1)	North Carolina (23–1)	North Carolina (24–1)	North Carolina (26–1)	North Carolina (27–2)	1.
2.	Kentucky	North Carolina (1–0)	Kentucky (2–0)	Kentucky (3–0)	Kentucky (5–0) (27)	Kentucky (7–0)	Kentucky (8–0)	Kentucky (10–0)	DePaul (13–0)	DePaul (14–0)	DePaul (16–0)	DePaul (17–0)	Georgetown (21–2)	Georgetown (23–2)	Houston (25–3)	Georgetown (26–3)	Georgetown (29–3)	2.
3.	Houston	Georgetown (2–0)	Georgetown (4–0)	Houston (5–1)	Houston (7–1)	Houston (10–1)	DePaul (9–0)	DePaul (11–0)	Kentucky (12–1)	Kentucky (14–2)	Kentucky (15–2)	Georgetown (19–2)	DePaul (18–1)	Houston (23–3)	Kentucky (20–3)	Kentucky (23–4)	Kentucky (26–4)	3.
4.	Georgetown	Memphis State (2–0)	Memphis State (4–0)	DePaul (5–0)	DePaul (7–0)	DePaul (8–0)	Georgetown (10–1)	Georgetown (12–1)	Houston (16–2)	Georgetown (15–2)	Georgetown (17–2)	UNLV (20–1)	Houston (21–3)	Kentucky (20–3)	Georgetown (24–3)	DePaul (24–2)	DePaul (26–2)	4.
5.	Memphis State	Iowa (1–0)	Iowa (3–0)	Georgetown (5–1)	Georgetown (7–1)	Georgetown (8–1)	Maryland (8–1)	Maryland (10–1)	UTEP (14–0)	Maryland (13–2)	UNLV (18–1)	Houston (19–3)	UNLV (22–1)	DePaul (19–2)	DePaul (21–2)	Houston (26–4)	Houston (28–4)	5.
6.	Louisville	Maryland (1–0)	Houston (3–1)	NC State (7–1) т	Boston College (7–0)	Maryland (6–1)	UCLA (7–1)	UCLA (9–1)	Georgetown (13–2)	UNLV (16–1)	Houston (17–3)	Kentucky (16–3)	Kentucky (18–3)	Illinois (20–3)	Oklahoma (24–3)	Oklahoma (27–3)	Illinois (24–4)	6.
7.	Iowa	NC State (4–0)	UCLA (3–0)	Memphis State (4–1) т	Purdue (7–0)	UCLA (6–1)	Houston (10–2)	Houston (12–2)	Maryland (11–2)	Houston (16–3)	UTEP (18–1)	UTEP (20–1)	Illinois (19–2)	UNLV (23–2)	UNLV (25–2)	Illinois (22–4)	Oklahoma (29–4)	7.
8.	Maryland	Houston (1–1)	NC State (5–1)	Boston College (5–0)	Maryland (5–1)	St. John's (7–0)	Wake Forest (9–0)	UTEP (13–0)	UNLV (14–1)	UTEP (16–1)	Illinois (15–2)	Illinois (17–2)	Memphis State (17–3)	Oklahoma (22–3)	UTEP (24–2)	Arkansas (24–5)	Arkansas (24–6)	8.
9.	UCLA	UCLA (2–0)	LSU (4–0)	Maryland (4–1)	UCLA (4–1)	LSU (6–1)	LSU (7–1)	Illinois (11–1)	UCLA (10–2)	Illinois (13–2)	Memphis State (14–3)	Memphis State (16–3)	Oklahoma (20–3)	UTEP (22–2)	Tulsa (23–2)	UTEP (25–3)	UTEP (27–3)	9.
10.	Oregon State	Oregon State (0–0)	Georgia (3–0)	LSU (4–1)	Louisville (4–2)	Wake Forest (6–0)	UTEP (11–0)	St. John's (10–1)	Illinois (12–2)	LSU (11–3)	Maryland (13–3)	Oklahoma (18–3)	UTEP (21–2)	Tulsa (22–2)	Illinois (20–4)	UNLV (25–4)	Purdue (22–6)	10.
11.	LSU	Michigan State (2–0)	Maryland (2–1)	Purdue (6–0)	LSU (4–1)	Georgia (7–1)	Georgia (7–1)	LSU (8–2)	Oregon State (9–2)	Oklahoma (15–2)	Tulsa (17–1)	Purdue (15–4)	Purdue (17–4)	Arkansas (21–4)	Purdue (19–5)	Purdue (20–6)	Maryland (23–7)	11.
12.	Michigan State	LSU (1–0)	Boston College (3–0)	Georgia (5–1)	St. John's (6–0)	Boston College (7–1)	NC State (10–2)	Wake Forest (10–1)	Wake Forest (11–2)	Tulsa (16–1)	Oklahoma (16–3)	Tulsa (18–2)	Tulsa (20–2)	Memphis State (19–4)	Arkansas (22–5)	Tulsa (24–3)	Tulsa (27–3)	12.
13.	Fresno State	Georgia (2–0)	DePaul (3–0)	St. John's (4–0)	NC State (7–2)	NC State (8–2)	St. John's (8–1)	Fresno State (11–2)	Tulsa (15–0)	Memphis State (12–3)	Syracuse (14–3)	Maryland (14–4)	Wake Forest (17–4)	Purdue (18–5)	Washington (20–5)	Washington (21–6)	UNLV (27–5)	13.
14.	Arkansas	Arkansas (2–1)	Wichita State (4–0)	Oregon State (2–1)	Georgia (6–1)	Louisville (4–3)	Illinois (9–1)	UNLV (10–1)	St. John's (11–3)	Louisville (11–4)	LSU (12–5)	Wake Forest (15–4)	Arkansas (19–4)	Duke (21–5)	Memphis State (20–5)	Maryland (20–7)	Duke (24–9)	14.
15.	Boston College	Boston College (0–0)	Arkansas (3–1)	UCLA (3–1)	Oregon State (4–1)	Michigan (8–0)	Oregon State (7–2)	Georgia (8–2)	LSU (10–3)	UCLA (11–3)	Wake Forest (13–4)	Louisville (15–5)	Washington (17–4)	Wake Forest (18–5)	Duke (22–6)	Temple (24–3)	Washington (22–6)	15.
16.	Georgia	DePaul (1–0)	St. John's (3–0)	Louisville (2–2)	Memphis State (5–2)	UTEP (8–0)	Fresno State (10–2)	Oregon State (8–2)	Boston College (11–3)	Arkansas (15–2)	Purdue (13–4)	Auburn (14–5)	Syracuse (15–5)	Syracuse (17–5)	Syracuse (18–6)	Duke (22–8)	Memphis State (24–6)	16.
17.	Kansas	Fresno State (1–1)	Michigan State (3–1)	Michigan State (3–1)	Wake Forest (5–0)	Memphis State (6–2)	Boston College (8–2)	Oklahoma (12–1)	Fresno State (12–2)	Wake Forest (12–3)	Louisville (12–5)	Washington (15–4)	Indiana (16–5)	Temple (20–2)	Wake Forest (19–6)	Memphis State (21–6)	Oregon State (22–6)	17.
18.	DePaul	Wichita State (1–0)	Oregon State (1–1)	Iowa (3–2)	UTEP (6–0)	Purdue (7–2)	UNLV (9–1)	Boston College (10–2)	Memphis State (11–3)	Georgia (12–3)	Georgia Tech (14–3)	Georgia Tech (15–5)	LSU (15–5)	Washington (18–5)	Temple (21–3)	Louisville (21–9)	Syracuse (22–8)	18.
19.	Indiana	St. John's (2–0)	Purdue (5–0)	Wake Forest (5–0)	Michigan State (5–1)	Oregon State (4–2)	Memphis State (8–3)	Memphis State (10–3)	Purdue (11–3)	Virginia (12–2)	Auburn (12–5)	Syracuse (14–5)	Duke (19–5)	Auburn (16–6)	Maryland (18–7)	Wake Forest (20–7)	Wake Forest (21–8)	19.
20.	Oklahoma	VCU (0–0)	Fresno State (3–1)	UTEP (5–0)	Michigan (7–0)	Illinois (8–1)	Virginia (9–0)	Tulsa (13–0)	Oklahoma (13–2)	Syracuse (12–3)	UCLA (12–4)	LSU (13–5)	Temple (18–2)	Oregon State (18–5)	Oregon State (19–6)	Oregon State (20–6)	Temple (25–4)	20.
	Preseason	Week 1 Nov. 28	Week 2 Dec. 5	Week 3 Dec. 12	Week 4 Dec. 19	Week 5 Dec. 26	Week 6 Jan. 2	Week 7 Jan. 9	Week 8 Jan. 16	Week 9 Jan. 23	Week 10 Jan. 30	Week 11 Feb. 6	Week 12 Feb. 13	Week 13 Feb. 20	Week 14 Feb. 27	Week 15 Mar. 5	Final Mar. 12	
		Dropped: Louisville; Kansas; Indiana; Oklahoma	Dropped: VCU (2–0)	Dropped: Wichita State; Arkansas; Fresno State	Dropped: Iowa (3–2)	Dropped: Michigan State (5–2)	Dropped: Louisville (5–4); Michigan; Purdue	Dropped: NC State; Virginia	Dropped: Georgia	Dropped: Oregon State (9–4); St. John's; Boston College; Fresno State; Purdue	Dropped: Arkansas (15–4); Georgia; Virginia	Dropped: UCLA	Dropped: Maryland (14–6); Louisville; Auburn (14–6); Georgia Tech	Dropped: Indiana; LSU	Dropped: Auburn	Dropped: Syracuse	Dropped: Louisville	

== Coaches Poll ==
	Week 2 Dec. 5	Week 3 Dec. 12	Week 4 Dec. 19	Week 5 Dec. 26	Week 6 Jan. 2	Week 7 Jan. 9	Week 8 Jan. 16	Week 9 Jan. 23	Week 10 Jan. 30	Week 11 Feb. 6	Week 12 Feb. 13	Week 13 Feb. 20	Week 14 Feb. 27	Week 15 Mar. 5	Final Mar. 12	
1.	Kentucky (2–0)	Kentucky (3–0)	Kentucky (5–0)	Kentucky (7–0)	Kentucky (8–0)	Kentucky (10–0)	North Carolina (12–0)	North Carolina (14–0)	North Carolina (17–0)	North Carolina (20–0)	North Carolina (21–1)	North Carolina (23–1)	North Carolina (24–1)	North Carolina (26–1)	North Carolina (27–2)	1.
2.	North Carolina (4–0)	North Carolina (5–0)	North Carolina (5–0)	North Carolina (6–0)	North Carolina (8–0)	North Carolina (10–0)	DePaul (13–0)	DePaul (14–0)	DePaul (16–0)	DePaul (17–0)	Georgetown (21–2)	Georgetown (23–2)	Houston (25–3)	Georgetown (26–3)	Georgetown (29–3)	2.
3.	Georgetown (4–0)	Houston (5–1)	Houston (7–1)	Houston (10–1)	DePaul (9–0)	DePaul (11–0)	Kentucky (12–1)	Kentucky (14–2)	Kentucky (15–2)	Georgetown (19–2)	DePaul (18–1)	Houston (23–3)	Kentucky (21–3)	Kentucky (23–4)	Kentucky (26–4)	3.
4.	Memphis State (4–0)	DePaul (5–0)	DePaul (7–0)	DePaul (8–0)	Georgetown (10–1)	Georgetown (12–1)	UTEP (14–0)	Georgetown (15–2)	Georgetown (17–2)	Houston (19–3)	Houston (21–3)	Kentucky (20–3)	Georgetown (24–3)	DePaul (24–2)	DePaul (26–2)	4.
5.	Iowa (3–0)	Georgetown (5–1)	Georgetown (7–1)	Georgetown (8–1)	Houston (10–2)	Houston (12–2)	Houston (16–2)	Maryland (13–2)	Houston (17–3)	UNLV (20–1)	UNLV (22–1)	DePaul (19–2)	DePaul (21–2)	Houston (26–4)	Houston (28–4)	5.
6.	Houston (3–1)	NC State (7–1)	Boston College (7–0)	Maryland (6–1)	Maryland (8–1)	Maryland (10–1)	Georgetown (13–2)	Houston (16–3)	UNLV (18–1)	UTEP (20–1) т	Kentucky (18–3)	Illinois (20–3)	UNLV (25–2)	Oklahoma (27–3)	Illinois (24–4)	6.
7.	UCLA (3–0)	Purdue (6–0)	Purdue (7–0)	St. John's (7–0)	UTEP (11–0)	UCLA (9–1)	Maryland (11–2)	Illinois (13–2)	Illinois (15–2)	Illinois (17–2) т	Illinois (19–2)	UNLV (23–2)	Oklahoma (24–3)	Illinois (22–4)	Arkansas (24–6)	7.
8.	Georgia (3–0)	Memphis State (4–1)	Louisville (4–2)	UCLA (6–1)	UCLA (7–1)	UTEP (13–0)	UNLV (14–1)	UTEP (16–1)	UTEP (18–1)	Kentucky (16–3)	UTEP (21–2)	Oklahoma (22–3)	UTEP (24–2)	Arkansas (24–5)	Oklahoma (29–4)	8.
9.	LSU (4–0)	Boston College (5–0)	UCLA (4–1)	LSU (6–1)	Wake Forest (9–0)	St. John's (10–1)	Illinois (12–2)	UNLV (16–1)	Maryland (13–3)	Memphis State (16–3)	Memphis State (17–3)	UTEP (22–2)	Purdue (19–5)	UTEP (25–3)	UTEP (27–3)	9.
10.	St. John's (3–0)	Georgia (5–1)	St. John's (6–0)	UTEP (8–0)	St. John's (8–1)	Illinois (11–1)	Oregon State (9–2)	Louisville (11–4)	Tulsa (17–1)	Oklahoma (18–3)	Oklahoma (20–3)	Tulsa (22–2)	Illinois (20–4)	UNLV (25–4)	Maryland (23–7)	10.
11.	Purdue (5–0)	Maryland (4–1)	Maryland (5–1)	Wake Forest (6–0) т	Georgia (7–1)	Fresno State (11–2)	UCLA (10–2)	Arkansas (15–2)	Memphis State (14–3)	Purdue (15–4)	Purdue (17–4)	Arkansas (21–4)	Tulsa (23–2)	Purdue (20–6)	Purdue (22–6)	11.
12.	Boston College (3–0)	St. John's (4–0)	Georgia (6–1)	Memphis State (6–2) т	NC State (10–2)	UNLV (10–1)	Tulsa (15–0)	Oklahoma (15–2)	Syracuse (14–3)	Tulsa (18–2)	Tulsa (20–2)	Purdue (18–5)	Arkansas (22–5)	Washington (21–6)	Tulsa (27–3)	12.
13.	NC State (5–1)	LSU (4–1)	LSU (4–1)	Georgia (7–1)	Illinois (9–1)	Wake Forest (10–1)	Wake Forest (11–2)	Tulsa (16–1)	Oklahoma (16–3)	Maryland (14–4)	Arkansas (19–4)	Memphis State (19–4)	Washington (20–5)	Tulsa (24–3)	UNLV (27–5)	13.
14.	DePaul (3–0)	Oregon State (2–1)	Oregon State (4–1)	Louisville (4–3) т	LSU (7–1)	Oregon State (8–2)	Purdue (11–3)	LSU (11–3)	Purdue (13–4)	Auburn (14–5)	Washington (17–4)	Washington (18–5)	Memphis State (20–5)	Maryland (20–7)	Duke (24–9)	14.
15.	Maryland (2–1)	UTEP (5–0)	Michigan (7–0)	Michigan (8–0) т	Fresno State (10–2)	Oklahoma (12–1)	Fresno State (12–2)	Memphis State (12–3)	Wake Forest (13–4)	Louisville (15–5)	Wake Forest (17–4)	Oregon State (18–5)	Temple (21–3)	Temple (24–3)	Washington (22–6)	15.
16.	Arkansas (3–1)	Louisville (2–2)	UTEP (6–0)	Illinois (8–1)	Oregon State (7–2)	Tulsa (13–0)	St. John's (11–3)	UCLA (11–3)	LSU (12–5)	Washington (15–4)	Auburn (14–6)	Syracuse (17–5)	Wake Forest (19–6)	Illinois State (21–6)	Memphis State (24–6) т	16.
17.	Oregon State (1–1)	UCLA (3–1)	Memphis State (5–2)	NC State (8–2)	Iowa (7–2)	LSU (8–2)	Oklahoma (13–2)	Wake Forest (12–3)	Auburn (12–5)	Wake Forest (15–4)	Temple (18–2) т	Temple (20–2)	Syracuse (18–6)	Oregon State (20–6)	Syracuse (22–8) т	17.
18.	Wichita State (4–0)	Michigan (6–0)	NC State (7–2)	Boston College (7–1)	UNLV (9–1)	Georgia (8–2)	LSU (10–3)	Georgia (12–3)	Arkansas (15–4)	Syracuse (14–5)	Illinois State (17–4) т	Auburn (16–6)	Duke (22–6)	Louisville (21–9)	Indiana (20–8)	18.
19.	Ohio State (3–0)	Michigan State (3–1)	Michigan State (5–1)	Purdue (7–2)	Memphis State (8–3)	Arkansas (11–2)	Arkansas (13–2)	Washington (13–3)	Louisville (12–5)	Arkansas (16–4)	Maryland (14–6) т	Duke (21–5)	Maryland (18–7)	Weber State (21–6)	Auburn (20–10)	19.
20.	Michigan State (3–1)	Iowa (3–2)	Wake Forest (5–0)	Arkansas (7–2)	Louisville (5–4)	Boston College (10–2)	Boston College (11–3)	Oregon State (9–4)	Oregon State (12–4)	Temple (16–2)	Indiana (16–5)	Illinois State (19–4)	Oregon State (19–6)	Memphis State (21–6)	Oregon State (22–6)	20.
	Week 2 Dec. 5	Week 3 Dec. 12	Week 4 Dec. 19	Week 5 Dec. 26	Week 6 Jan. 2	Week 7 Jan. 9	Week 8 Jan. 16	Week 9 Jan. 23	Week 10 Jan. 30	Week 11 Feb. 6	Week 12 Feb. 13	Week 13 Feb. 20	Week 14 Feb. 27	Week 15 Mar. 5	Final Mar. 12	
		Dropped: Arkansas; Wichita State; Ohio State	Dropped: Iowa	Dropped: Oregon State (4–2); Michigan State	Dropped: Michigan; Boston College (8–2); Purdue; Arkansas	Dropped: NC State; Iowa; Memphis State (10–3); Louisville	Dropped: Georgia	Dropped: Purdue; Fresno State; St. John's; Boston College	Dropped: UCLA (12–4); Georgia; Washington	Dropped: LSU (13–5); Oregon State	Dropped: Louisville; Syracuse (15–5)	Dropped: Wake Forest (18–5); Maryland; Indiana	Dropped: Auburn; Illinois State	Dropped: Wake Forest (20–7); Syracuse; Duke (22–8); Maryland	Dropped: Temple; Illinois State; Louisville; Weber State	
