= 1984 MEAC men's basketball tournament =

- Classification: Division I
- Season: 1983–84
- Teams: 6
- Site: Campus sites
- Finals site: Greensboro Coliseum; Greensboro, North Carolina
- Champions: North Carolina A&T (9th title)
- Winning coach: Don Corbett (3rd title)
- MVP: Eric Boyd (North Carolina A&T)

1983–84 MEAC men's basketball standings
	Conf.				Overall
Team	W		L	PCT	W		L	PCT
North Carolina A&T †	9	–	1	.900	22	–	7	.759
Howard	7	–	3	.700	14	–	13	.519
South Carolina State	6	–	4	.600	13	–	16	.448
Delaware State	3	–	7	.300	12	–	16	.429
Maryland Eastern Shore	3	–	7	.300	7	–	21	.250
Bethune–Cookman	2	–	8	.200	6	–	22	.214
Florida A&M		–		–	7	–	19	.269
† 1984 MEAC tournament winner Rankings from AP Poll

The 1984 Mid-Eastern Athletic Conference men's basketball tournament took place March 8–10, 1984 at Greensboro Coliseum in Greensboro, North Carolina. North Carolina A&T defeated Howard, 65–58 in the championship game, to win its third consecutive MEAC Tournament title.

The Aggies earned an automatic bid to the 1984 NCAA tournament as a No. 12 seed in the Mideast region.

== Format ==
Six of seven conference members participated, with play beginning in the quarterfinal round. Teams were seeded based on their regular season conference record.

== Bracket ==
Quarterfinals; March 8
4	Delaware State	67
5	Maryland Eastern Shore	52
3	South Carolina State	71
6	Bethune–Cookman	65

Semifinals; March 9
1	North Carolina A&T	70
4	Delaware State	62
3	South Carolina State	59
2	Howard	73

Final; March 10
1	North Carolina A&T	65
2	Howard	58
