= 1983–84 DePaul Blue Demons men's basketball team =

American college basketball season

1983–84 DePaul Blue Demons men's basketball
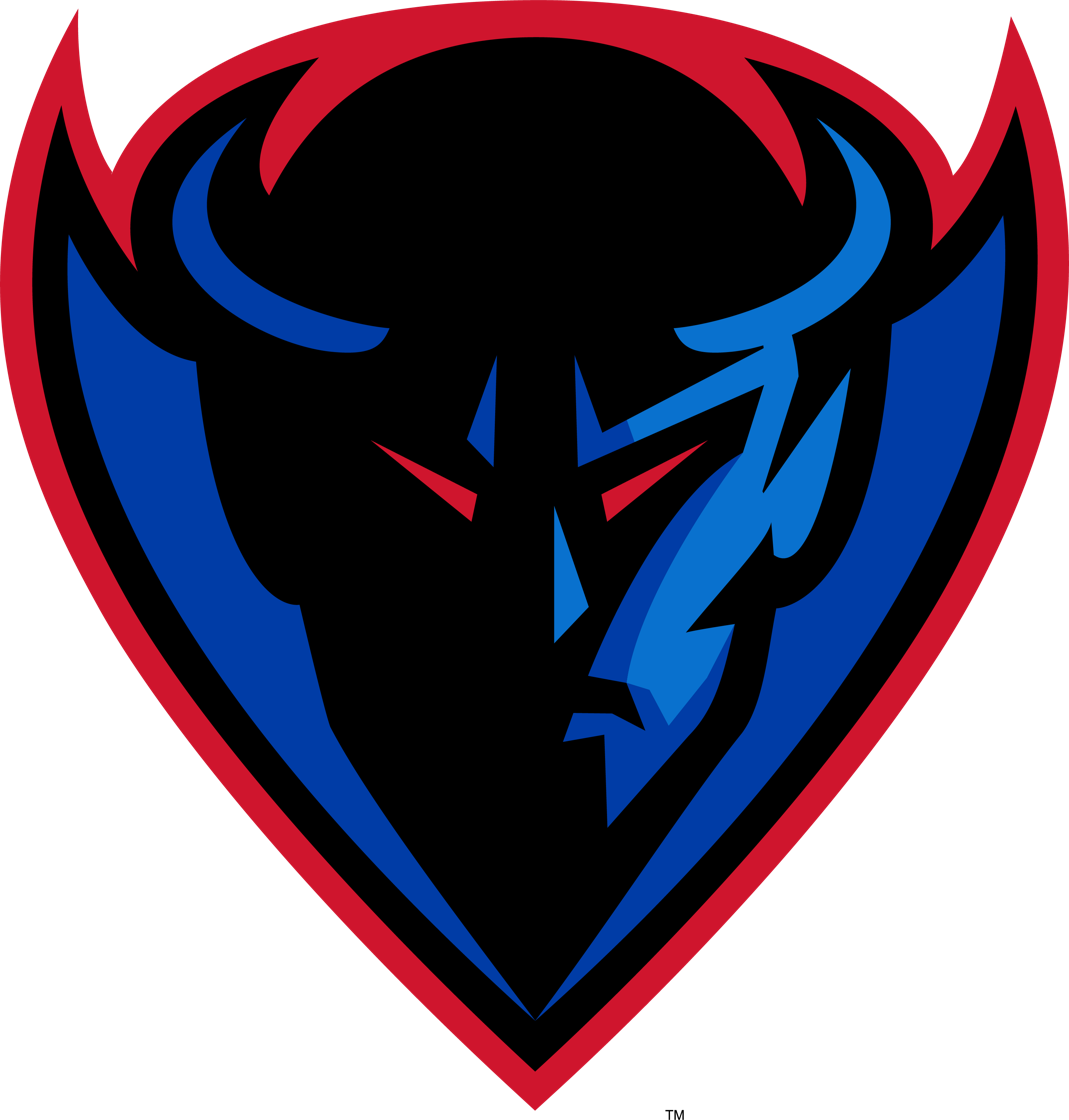

NCAA tournament, Sweet Sixteen
- Conference: Independent

Ranking
- Coaches: No. 4
- AP: No. 4
- Record: 27–3
- Head coach: Ray Meyer (42nd season)
- Assistant coaches: Kenny McReynolds; Joey Meyer (10th season); Jim Molinari (5th season)
- Home arena: Rosemont Horizon

1983–84 NCAA Division I men's basketball independents standings
	Conf.				Overall
Team	W		L	PCT	W		L	PCT
No. 4 DePaul		–		–	27	–	3	.900
UTSA		–		–	20	–	8	.714
Southwestern Louisiana		–		–	23	–	10	.697
Stetson		–		–	19	–	9	.679
Dayton		–		–	21	–	11	.656
Notre Dame		–		–	21	–	12	.636
Marquette		–		–	17	–	13	.567
Baptist		–		–	15	–	13	.536
New Orleans		–		–	14	–	14	.500
Texas–Pan American		–		–	13	–	14	.481
Tennessee State		–		–	12	–	15	.444
Utica		–		–	11	–	15	.423
Southeastern Louisiana		–		–	11	–	17	.393
UNC Wilmington		–		–	11	–	17	.393
Campbell		–		–	10	–	18	.357
Brooklyn		–		–	8	–	20	.286
Monmouth		–		–	6	–	21	.222
Georgia State		–		–	6	–	22	.214
Eastern Washington		–		–	4	–	22	.154
U.S. International		–		–	2	–	26	.071
Rankings from AP Poll

The 1983–84 DePaul Blue Demons men's basketball team represented DePaul University during the 1983–84 NCAA Division I men's basketball season. They were led by head coach Ray Meyer, in his 42nd and final season at the school, and played their home games at the Rosemont Horizon in Rosemont.

After opening the season with a No. 18 ranking in the AP poll, the Blue Demons won their first 16 games – including victories over No. 3 Georgetown, No. 7 Purdue, and at No. 15 UCLA – to vault to No. 2. DePaul received a bid to the 1984 NCAA Tournament as the No. 1 seed in the Midwest region. In the second round, DePaul beat Illinois State to advance to the Sweet Sixteen where they were upset by Wake Forest in overtime, 73–71. The Blue Demons finished the season 27–3 and ranked No. 4 in both major polls.

As of 2025, this is the last time DePaul has, officially, made the second weekend of the NCAA tournament. Further appearances in 1986 and 1987, the latest DePaul Sweet Sixteen appearances in actuality, have been vacated by the NCAA.

== Roster ==
1983–84 DePaul Blue Demons men's basketball team
Players
Coaches

Pos.	#	Name	Height	Weight	Year	Previous school	Hometown
G	10	Kenny Patterson	6 ft 2 in (1.88 m)	175 lb (79 kg)	Jr	Forest Hills	Queens, NY
G	11	Raymond McCoy	6 ft 1 in (1.85 m)	180 lb (82 kg)	Sr	Bloom	Chicago Heights, IL
G	14	Jerry McMillan	6 ft 4 in (1.93 m)	175 lb (79 kg)	Sr	Barringer	Newark, NJ
G	20	Tony Jackson	6 ft 5 in (1.96 m)	195 lb (88 kg)	So	Bishop O'Dowd	San Francisco, CA
F	23	Tyrone Corbin	6 ft 6 in (1.98 m)	210 lb (95 kg)	Jr	Carver	Columbia, SC
C	32	Lemone Lampley	6 ft 11 in (2.11 m)	200 lb (91 kg)	So	Chicago Vocational	Chicago, IL
F	33	Lawrence West	6 ft 7 in (2.01 m)	195 lb (88 kg)	Fr	Morse	San Diego, CA
F	34	Kevin Holmes	6 ft 8 in (2.03 m)	215 lb (98 kg)	So	Cleveland	Los Angeles, CA
F	35	Dallas Comegys	6 ft 9 in (2.06 m)	195 lb (88 kg)	Fr	Roman Catholic	Philadelphia, PA
G	44	Jack Lattner	6 ft 2 in (1.88 m)	185 lb (84 kg)	Sr	Fenwick	Oak Park, IL
C	51	Marty Embry	6 ft 9 in (2.06 m)	230 lb (104 kg)	So	Flint Central	Flint, MI

Head coach

- Ray Meyer

Assistant coach(es)

- Kenny McReynolds
- Joey Meyer (DePaul)
- Jim Molinari (Illinois Wesleyan)

Legend

- (C) Team captain
- (S) Suspended
- (I) Ineligible
- (W) Walk-on
- Injured
- Current redshirt

Roster

== Schedule and results ==
Date time, TV	Rank^{#}	Opponent^{#}	Result	Record	Site city, state
Regular season
Nov 26, 1983*	No. 18	at Northern Illinois	W 73–58	1–0	Chick Evans Field House (5,057); Dekalb, Illinois
Nov 30, 1983*	No. 16	Ohio	W 69–45	2–0	Rosemont Horizon (10,255); Rosemont, Illinois
Dec 3, 1983*	No. 16	Illinois State	W 69–66	3–0	Rosemont Horizon (13,057); Rosemont, Illinois
Dec 6, 1983*	No. 13	Western Michigan	W 84–60	4–0	Rosemont Horizon (9,074); Rosemont, Illinois
Dec 10, 1983*	No. 13	No. 3 Georgetown	W 63–61	5–0	Rosemont Horizon (17,499); Rosemont, Illinois
Dec 15, 1983*	No. 4	vs. Alabama; Suntory Ball tournament	W 77–76	6–0	Aoyama Gakuin Memorial Hall (15,500); Tokyo, Japan
Dec 16, 1983*	No. 4	vs. Texas Tech; Suntory Ball tournament	W 50–47	7–0	Aoyama Gakuin Memorial Hall (5,000); Tokyo, Japan
Dec 22, 1983*	No. 4	No. 7 Purdue	W 68–61	8–0	Rosemont Horizon (15,555); Rosemont, Illinois
Dec 31, 1983*	No. 4	at Creighton	W 59–57	9–0	Omaha Civic Auditorium (7,208); Omaha, Nebraska
Jan 2, 1984*	No. 4	Biscayne College	W 78–50	10–0	Rosemont Horizon (6,418); Rosemont, Illinois
Jan 5, 1984*	No. 3	at Pepperdine	W 81–73	11–0	Firestone Fieldhouse (4,305); Malibu, California
Jan 9, 1984*	No. 3	at Saint Mary's	W 76–74	12–0	McKeon Pavilion (3,759); Moraga, California
Jan 14, 1984*	No. 3	UAB	W 98–63	13–0	Rosemont Horizon (13,431); Rosemont, Illinois
Jan 20, 1984*	No. 3	at South Florida	W 59–50	14–0	Sun Dome (10,259); Tampa, Florida
Jan 25, 1984*	No. 2	Princeton	W 50–39	15–0	Rosemont Horizon (11,590); Rosemont, Illinois
Jan 28, 1984*	No. 2	at No. 15 UCLA	W 84–68	16–0	Pauley Pavilion (10,264); Los Angeles, California
Feb 4, 1984*	No. 2	St. John's	W 59–57	17–0	Rosemont Horizon (17,499); Rosemont, Illinois
Feb 7, 1984*	No. 3	at Saint Joseph's	L 45–58	17–1	The Palestra (8,421); Philadelphia, Pennsylvania
Feb 11, 1984*	No. 3	at Notre Dame	W 62–54	18–1	Joyce Center (11,345); Notre Dame, Indiana
Feb 15, 1984*	No. 3	Loyola (IL)	W 93–77	19–1	Rosemont Horizon (16,065); Rosemont, Illinois
Feb 18, 1984*	No. 3	at Dayton	L 71–72	19–2	University of Dayton Arena (12,723); Dayton, Ohio
Feb 22, 1984*	No. 3	Dayton	W 79–59	20–2	Rosemont Horizon (13,029); Rosemont, Illinois
Feb 26, 1984*	No. 5	Louisville	W 73–63	21–2	Rosemont Horizon (17,499); Rosemont, Illinois
Feb 28, 1984*	No. 5	Evansville	W 96–65	22–2	Rosemont Horizon (11,922); Rosemont, Illinois
Mar 1, 1984*	No. 4	South Carolina	W 65–56	23–2	Rosemont Horizon (13,446); Rosemont, Illinois
Mar 4, 1984*	No. 4	at Detroit	W 66–47	24–2	Calihan Hall (7,664); Detroit, Michigan
Mar 6, 1984*	No. 4	Texas-Rio Grande Valley	W 62–29	25–2	Rosemont Horizon (11,652); Rosemont, Illinois
Mar 10, 1984*	No. 4	Marquette	W 64–49	26–2	Rosemont Horizon (17,559); Rosemont, Illinois
NCAA Tournament
Mar 18, 1984*	(1 MW) No. 4	vs. (8 MW) Illinois State	W 75–61	27–2	Bob Devaney Sports Center (13,440); Lincoln, Nebraska
Mar 23, 1984*	(1 MW) No. 4	vs. (4 MW) No. 19 Wake Forest; Regional semifinal – Sweet Sixteen	L 71–73 ^{OT}	27–3	St. Louis Arena (20,143); St. Louis, Missouri
*Non-conference game. ^{#}Rankings from AP Poll. (#) Tournament seedings in parentheses. MW=Midwest.

== Rankings ==
Ranking movements Legend: ██ Increase in ranking ██ Decrease in ranking
	Week																
Poll	Pre	1	2	3	4	5	6	7	8	9	10	11	12	13	14	15	Final
AP	18	16	13	4	4	4	3	3	2	2	2	2	3	5	5	4	4
Coaches	Not released		14	4	4	4	3	3	2	2	2	2	3	5	5	4	4
