= 1983–84 Michigan Wolverines men's basketball team =

American college basketball season

1983–84 Michigan Wolverines men's basketball

National Invitational Tournament champions
- Conference: Big Ten Conference
- Record: 24-9 (10–8 Big Ten)
- Head coach: Bill Frieder
- Assistant coaches: Steve Fisher; Mike Boyd; Bud VanDeWege
- MVP: Roy Tarpley
- Captains: Tim McCormick; Eric Turner
- Home arena: Crisler Arena

1983–84 Big Ten Conference men's basketball standings
	Conf.				Overall
Team	W		L	PCT	W		L	PCT
No. 6 Illinois	15	–	3	.833	26	–	5	.839
No. 10 Purdue	15	–	3	.833	22	–	7	.759
Indiana	13	–	5	.722	22	–	9	.710
Michigan	10	–	8	.556	24	–	9	.727
Michigan State	8	–	10	.444	15	–	13	.536
Ohio State	8	–	10	.444	15	–	14	.517
Northwestern	5	–	13	.278	14	–	14	.500
Minnesota	6	–	12	.333	15	–	13	.536
Iowa	6	–	12	.333	13	–	15	.464
Wisconsin*	0	–	18	.000	0	–	28	.000
Rankings from AP Poll; *Wisconsin forfeited all games due to NCAA sanctions. Disputed record (4–14, 8–20)

The 1983–84 Michigan Wolverines men's basketball team represented the University of Michigan in intercollegiate college basketball during the 1983–84 season. The team played its home games in the Crisler Arena in Ann Arbor, Michigan, and was a member of the Big Ten Conference. Under the direction of head coach Bill Frieder, the team finished tied for fourth in the Big Ten Conference. The team earned an invitation to the 1984 National Invitation Tournament (NIT) where it was crowned champion. Although during the seventeen weeks of Associated Press Top Twenty Poll the team was ranked twice, including a peak of number fifteen, it began and finished the season unranked and it also ended the season unranked in the final UPI Coaches' Poll. Dan Pelekoudas earned honorable mention Academic All-American recognition. Tim McCormick and Eric Turner served as team captains, while Roy Tarpley earned team MVP. Turner's career assist total of 421 eclipsed Steve Grote's 358 and would stand until Antoine Joubert tied him as a junior and then totaled 539 in 1987, while his career average of 5.00 per game, which surpassed Rickey Green's 4.05 would stand until Gary Grant's career ended in 1988 with 5.67 per game. Tarpley 69 blocked shots and 2.09 blocked shot average were school records that he would break himself in subsequent seasons. Turner ended his career with an average of 35.3 minutes per game, which surpassed Mike McGee's 1981 record and continues to be the school's best. On January 28, 1984, against Illinois Turner played 56 minutes for the highest single game total in school history, surpassing his 55-minute effort the prior year. The record still stands.

In the 32-team National Invitation Tournament, Michigan advanced to the final four by defeating the Wichita State Shockers 94–70, the Marquette Golden Eagles 83–70 and the Xavier Musketeers 63–62. At the final four in Madison Square Garden the team defeated the Louisiana-Lafayette Ragin' Cajuns 65–59 before beating the Notre Dame Fighting Irish 83–63. McCormick was awarded the 1984 NIT Most valuable player award.

== Schedule ==
Date time, TV	Rank^{#}	Opponent^{#}	Result	Record	Site city, state
Regular Season
November 25, 1983*		Toledo	W 55–52	1–0	Crisler Arena (13,042); Ann Arbor, Michigan
November 28, 1983*		North Carolina A&T	W 71–55	2–0	Crisler Arena (10,805); Ann Arbor, Michigan
November 30, 1983*		Central Michigan	W 58–39	3–0	Crisler Arena (10,158); Ann Arbor, Michigan
December 3, 1983*		Northern Michigan	W 96–78	4–0	Crisler Arena (10,033); Ann Arbor, Michigan
December 5, 1983*		at No. 10 Georgia	W 76–70	5–0	The Omni (4,160); Atlanta, Georgia
December 10, 1983*		Dayton	W 82–60	6–0	Crisler Arena (10,972); Ann Arbor, Michigan
December 17, 1983*		Detroit Mercy	W 84–63	7–0	Crisler Arena (13,079); Ann Arbor, Michigan
December 21, 1983*	No. 20	at Rutgers	W 97–69	8–0	Byrne Meadowlands Arena (5,144); East Rutherford, New Jersey
December 27, 1983*	No. 15	vs. No. 16 UTEP	L 71–72	8–1	Special Events Center (11,539); El Paso, Texas
December 28, 1983*	No. 15	vs. Texas Tech	L 58–59	8–2	Special Events Center (11,907); El Paso, Texas
January 5, 1984		Northwestern	W 68–51	9–2 (1–0)	Crisler Arena (11,715); Ann Arbor, Michigan
January 7, 1984		Iowa	W 53–49	10–2 (2–0)	Crisler Arena (13,609); Ann Arbor, Michigan
January 12, 1984		at Minnesota	W 66–62	11–2 (3–0)	Williams Arena (14,366); Minneapolis, Minnesota
January 14, 1984		at Wisconsin	L 64–71	11–3 (3–1)	Wisconsin Field House (8,646); Madison, Wisconsin
January 18, 1984		Ohio State	L 60–62	11–4 (3–2)	Crisler Arena (13,011); Ann Arbor, Michigan
January 21, 1984		Indiana	W 55–50	12–4 (4–2)	Crisler Arena (13,609); Ann Arbor, Michigan
January 26, 1984		at Purdue	L 57–61	12–5 (4–3)	Mackey Arena (13,610); West Lafayette, Indiana
January 28, 1984		at No. 9 Illinois	L 66–75	12–6 (4–4)	Assembly Hall (15,952); Champaign, Illinois
February 2, 1984		at Michigan State	L 67–72	12–7 (4–5)	Jenison Fieldhouse (10,004); East Lansing, Michigan
February 11, 1984		Michigan State	W 71–61	13–7 (5–5)	Crisler Arena (13,609); Ann Arbor, Michigan
February 16, 1984		No. 7 Illinois	W 62–60	14–7 (6–5)	Crisler Arena (13,511); Ann Arbor, Michigan
February 18, 1984		No. 11 Purdue	L 64–67	14–8 (6–6)	Crisler Arena (13,609); Ann Arbor, Michigan
February 23, 1984		at Indiana	L 57–72	14–9 (6–7)	Assembly Hall (16,723); Bloomington, Indiana
February 25, 1984		at Ohio State	W 62–59	15–9 (7–7)	St. John Arena (13,591); Columbus, Ohio
March 1, 1984		Wisconsin	W 84–75	16–9 (8–7)	Crisler Arena (13,109); Ann Arbor, Michigan
March 3, 1984		Minnesota	W 51–50	17–9 (9–7)	Crisler Arena (13,485); Ann Arbor, Michigan
March 7, 1984		at Iowa	W 53–46	18–9 (10–7)	Carver-Hawkeye Arena (15,450); Iowa City, Iowa
March 10, 1984		at Northwestern	L 52–54	19–9 (10–8)	Welsh-Ryan Arena (8,092); Evanston, Illinois
NIT
March 15, 1984		vs. Wichita State; First Round	W 94–70	20–9	Crisler Arena (7,043); Ann Arbor, Michigan
March 19, 1984		vs. Marquette; Second Round	W 83–70	21–9	Crisler Arena (11,529); Ann Arbor, Michigan
March 22, 1984		vs. Xavier; Quarterfinals	W 63–62	22–9	Crisler Arena (12,178); Ann Arbor, Michigan
March 26, 1984		vs. Virginia Tech; Semifinals	W 78–75	23–9	Madison Square Garden; New York, New York
March 28, 1984		vs. Notre Dame; Championship	W 83–63	24–9	Madison Square Garden (13,123); New York, New York
*Non-conference game. ^{#}Rankings from AP poll. (#) Tournament seedings in parentheses.

== Statistics ==
The team posted the following statistics:

Name	GP	GS	Min	Avg	FG	FGA	FG%	3FG	3FGA	3FG%	FT	FTA	FT%	OR	DR	RB	Avg	Ast	Avg	PF	DQ	TO	Stl	Blk	Pts	Avg
Roy Tarpley	33	20	930	28.2	165	315	0.524	--	--		81	102	0.794			265	8.0	29	0.9	94	3	58	19	69	411	12.4
Tim McCormick	32	29	978	30.6	132	226	0.584	--	--		124	186	0.667			189	5.9	31	1.0	87	3	52	13	15	388	12.1
Eric Turner	31	30	1021	32.9	123	292	0.421	--	--		88	113	0.779			65	2.1	141	4.5	57	2	96	32	0	334	10.8
Antoine Joubert	33	22	875	26.5	118	263	0.449	--	--		60	81	0.741			68	2.1	102	3.1	80	0	73	23	1	296	9.0
Richard Rellford	33	28	695	21.1	105	185	0.568	--	--		49	63	0.778			107	3.2	12	0.4	96	1	37	24	13	259	7.8
Leslie Rockymore	29	18	609	21.0	93	219	0.425	--	--		27	34	0.794			41	1.4	42	1.5	45	1	30	20	1	213	7.3
Butch Wade	33	12	661	20.0	75	159	0.472	--	--		28	59	0.475			181	5.5	14	0.4	93	2	27	22	8	178	5.4
Dan Pelekoudas	33	1	552	16.7	21	49	0.429	--	--		26	32	0.813			25	0.8	73	2.2	85	4	53	30	1	68	2.1
Robert Henderson	23	3	180	7.8	11	27	0.407	--	--		15	27	0.556			45	2.0	4	0.2	10	0	10	0	2	37	1.6
Paul Jokisch	13	0	71	5.5	10	25	0.400	--	--		7	13	0.538			8	0.6	1	0.1	13	0	6	1	2	27	2.1
Garde Thompson	18	2	126	7.0	9	26	0.346	--	--		7	8	0.875			11	0.6	14	0.8	12	0	13	6	0	25	1.4
Gerard Rudy	13	0	25	1.9	3	4	0.750	--	--		5	6	0.833			7	0.5	3	0.2	1	0	3	0	0	11	0.9
Quincy Turner	5	0	18	3.6	2	6	0.333	--	--		7	8	0.875			0	0.0	2	0.4	4	0	2	0	0	11	2.2
Jon Antnoides	6	0	9	1.5	0	2	0.000	--	--		3	4	0.750			5	0.8	0	0.0	3	0	3	1	1	3	0.5
Team	33														69	101	3.1									
Season total	33				867	1798	0.482				527	736	0.716			1118	33.9	468	14.2	680	16	463	191	113	2261	68.5
Opponents	33				775	1714	0.452	--	--		504	710	0.710			1002	30.4	350	10.6	654	32	472	177	86	2054	62.2

== National Invitation Tournament ==
Michigan won the 1984 National Invitation Tournament.

- First Round
  - Michigan 94, Wichita State 70, at Ann Arbor, Mich
- Second Round
  - Michigan 83, Marquette 70, at Ann Arbor, Mich
- Quarterfinal
  - Michigan 63, Xavier 62, at Ann Arbor, Mich
- Semifinal
  - Michigan 78, Virginia Tech 75
- Final
  - Michigan 83, Notre Dame 63

== Awards and honors ==
During the season team members earned the following honors:

- Tim McCormick
  - NIT Most Valuable Player
  - Academic All-Big Ten
  - All-Big Ten Conference, 3rd team
- Dan Pelekoudas
  - Academic All-American, honorable mention
  - Academic All-Big Ten
- Eric Turner
  - All-Big Ten Conference, 2nd team
- Roy Tarpley
  - All-Big Ten Conference, 3rd team

== Rankings ==
Ranking movements Legend: ██ Increase in ranking ██ Decrease in ranking
	Week																
Poll	Pre	1	2	3	4	5	6	7	8	9	10	11	12	13	14	15	Final
AP Poll					20	15											

== Team players drafted into the NBA ==
Eight players from this team were selected in the NBA draft.

Year	Round	Pick	Overall	Player	NBA club
1984	1	12	12	Tim McCormick	Cleveland Cavaliers
1984	2	8	32	Eric Turner	Detroit Pistons
1984	10	19	225	Dan Pelekoudas	Detroit Pistons
1986	1	7	7	Roy Tarpley	Dallas Mavericks
1986	5	2	95	Richard Rellford	Indiana Pacers
1986	6	1	117	Butch Wade	New York Knicks
1986	7	5	144	Robert Henderson	Chicago Bulls
1987	6	20	135	Antoine Joubert	Detroit Pistons

== See also ==
- NIT all-time team records
- NIT bids by school and conference
- NIT championships and semifinal appearances
