= 1983–84 Purdue Boilermakers men's basketball team =

American college basketball season

1983–84 Purdue Boilermakers men's basketball

Big Ten champions

NCAA tournament
- Conference: Big Ten Conference

Ranking
- Coaches: No. 11
- AP: No. 10
- Record: 22–7 (15–3 Big Ten)
- Head coach: Gene Keady (4th season)
- Assistant coach: Bruce Weber (4th season)
- Home arena: Mackey Arena

1983–84 Big Ten Conference men's basketball standings
	Conf.				Overall
Team	W		L	PCT	W		L	PCT
No. 6 Illinois	15	–	3	.833	26	–	5	.839
No. 10 Purdue	15	–	3	.833	22	–	7	.759
Indiana	13	–	5	.722	22	–	9	.710
Michigan	10	–	8	.556	24	–	9	.727
Michigan State	8	–	10	.444	15	–	13	.536
Ohio State	8	–	10	.444	15	–	14	.517
Northwestern	5	–	13	.278	14	–	14	.500
Minnesota	6	–	12	.333	15	–	13	.536
Iowa	6	–	12	.333	13	–	15	.464
Wisconsin*	0	–	18	.000	0	–	28	.000
Rankings from AP Poll; *Wisconsin forfeited all games due to NCAA sanctions. Disputed record (4–14, 8–20)

The 1983–84 Purdue Boilermakers men's basketball team represented Purdue University as a member of the Big Ten Conference during the 1983–84 college basketball season. The Boilermakers were led by fourth-year head coach Gene Keady and played their home games at Mackey Arena in West Lafayette, Indiana. Purdue won the Big Ten title to receive an automatic bid to the NCAA tournament as No. 3 seed in the Midwest region. The Boilermakers – playing a true road game despite being the higher seed – were upset by Memphis State in the round of 32. The team finished with an overall record of 22–7 (15–3 Big Ten).

== Roster ==
1983–84 Purdue Boilermakers men's basketball team
Players
Coaches

Pos.	#	Name	Height	Weight	Year	Hometown
G	11	Mack Gadis	6 ft 1 in (1.85 m)	—	So	Indianapolis, Indiana
F	15	Jim Bullock	6 ft 6 in (1.98 m)	210 lb (95 kg)	Jr
G	21	Ricky Hall	6 ft 1 in (1.85 m)	—	Sr
C	41	Jim Rowinski	6 ft 8 in (2.03 m)	240 lb (109 kg)	Sr	Long Island, New York

Head coach

- Gene Keady (Kansas State)

Assistant coach(es)

- Bruce Weber (Milwaukee)

Legend

- (C) Team captain
- (S) Suspended
- (I) Ineligible
- (W) Walk-on
- Injured
- Current redshirt

== Schedule and results ==
Date time, TV	Rank^{#}	Opponent^{#}	Result	Record	Site city, state
Non-Conference Regular Season
Nov 25, 1983*		vs. Northeastern; Sun Met Classic	W 83–64	1–0	Selland Arena; Fresno, California
Nov 26, 1983*		at No. 13 Fresno State; Sun Met Classic	W 56–55	2–0	Selland Arena; Fresno, California
Nov 30, 1983*		Louisville	W 90–83	3–0	Mackey Arena; West Lafayette, Indiana
Dec 3, 1983*		at Miami (OH)	W 67–58	4–0	Millett Hall; Oxford, Ohio
Dec 5, 1983*		Boston University	W 77–65	5–0	Mackey Arena; West Lafayette, Indiana
Dec 10, 1983*	No. 19	Tampa	W 106–50	6–0	Mackey Arena; West Lafayette, Indiana
Dec 17, 1983*	No. 11	Youngstown State	W 65–54	7–0	Mackey Arena; West Lafayette, Indiana
Dec 19, 1983*	No. 11	at Evansville	L 65–80	7–1	Roberts Stadium; Evansville, Indiana
Dec 22, 1983*	No. 7	at No. 4 DePaul	L 61–68	7–2	Rosemont Horizon; Rosemont, Illinois
Dec 28, 1983*	No. 18	vs. No. 2 Kentucky	L 67–86	7–3	Freedom Hall; Louisville, Kentucky
Big Ten Regular Season
Jan 5, 1984		Wisconsin	W 84–65	8–3 (1–0)	Mackey Arena; West Lafayette, Indiana
Jan 7, 1984		Minnesota	W 72–69	9–3 (2–0)	Mackey Arena; West Lafayette, Indiana
Jan 12, 1984		at Ohio State	W 63–52	10–3 (3–0)	St. John Arena; Columbus, Ohio
Jan 14, 1984		at Indiana	W 74–66	11–3 (4–0)	Assembly Hall; Bloomington, Indiana
Jan 21, 1984	No. 19	at No. 10 Illinois	L 52–76	11–4 (4–1)	Assembly Hall; Champaign, Illinois
Jan 26, 1984		Michigan	W 61–57	12–4 (5–1)	Mackey Arena; West Lafayette, Indiana
Jan 28, 1984		Michigan State	W 72–54	13–4 (6–1)	Mackey Arena; West Lafayette, Indiana
Feb 1, 1984	No. 16	at Northwestern	W 52–44	14–4 (7–1)	Welsh-Ryan Arena; Evanston, Illinois
Feb 4, 1984	No. 16	at Iowa	W 48–46	15–4 (8–1)	Carver-Hawkeye Arena; Iowa City, Iowa
Feb 9, 1984	No. 11	Iowa	W 79–58	16–4 (9–1)	Mackey Arena; West Lafayette, Indiana
Feb 11, 1984	No. 11	Northwestern	W 66–56	17–4 (10–1)	Mackey Arena; West Lafayette, Indiana
Feb 16, 1984	No. 11	at Michigan State	L 53–63	17–5 (10–2)	Jenison Fieldhouse; East Lansing, Michigan
Feb 18, 1984	No. 11	at Michigan	W 67–64	18–5 (11–2)	Crisler Arena; Ann Arbor, Michigan
Feb 25, 1984	No. 13	No. 6 Illinois	W 59–55	19–5 (12–2)	Mackey Arena; West Lafayette, Indiana
Feb 29, 1984	No. 11	Indiana	L 59–78	19–6 (12–3)	Mackey Arena; West Lafayette, Indiana
Mar 3, 1984	No. 11	Ohio State	W 85–63	20–6 (13–3)	Mackey Arena; West Lafayette, Indiana
Mar 6, 1984	No. 11	at Wisconsin	W 61–48	21–6 (14–3)	Wisconsin Field House; Madison, Wisconsin
Mar 10, 1984	No. 11	at Minnesota	W 63–62	22–6 (15–3)	Williams Arena; Minneapolis, Minnesota
NCAA Tournament
Mar 17, 1984*	(3 MW) No. 10	vs. (6 MW) No. 16 Memphis State; Second round	L 48–66	22–7	Mid-South Coliseum; Memphis, Tennessee
*Non-conference game. ^{#}Rankings from AP Poll. (#) Tournament seedings in parentheses. All times are in Eastern Time.

== Awards and honors ==
- Gene Keady – Big Ten Coach of the Year
