= 1983–84 North Carolina A&T Aggies men's basketball team =

American college basketball season

1983–84 North Carolina A&T Aggies men's basketball

MEAC regular season champions MEAC tournament champions

NCAA tournament, Play-in game
- Conference: Mid-Eastern Athletic Conference
- Record: 22–7 (9–1 MEAC)
- Head coach: Don Corbett (5th season)
- Home arena: Corbett Sports Center

1983–84 MEAC men's basketball standings
	Conf.				Overall
Team	W		L	PCT	W		L	PCT
North Carolina A&T †	9	–	1	.900	22	–	7	.759
Howard	7	–	3	.700	14	–	13	.519
South Carolina State	6	–	4	.600	13	–	16	.448
Delaware State	3	–	7	.300	12	–	16	.429
Maryland Eastern Shore	3	–	7	.300	7	–	21	.250
Bethune–Cookman	2	–	8	.200	6	–	22	.214
Florida A&M		–		–	7	–	19	.269
† 1984 MEAC tournament winner Rankings from AP Poll

The 1983–84 North Carolina A&T Aggies men's basketball team represented North Carolina Agricultural and Technical State University during the 1983–84 NCAA Division I men's basketball season. The Aggies, led by fifth-year head coach Don Corbett, played their home games at the Corbett Sports Center as members of the Mid-Eastern Athletic Conference. They finished the season 22–7, 9–1 in MEAC play to finish in first place. They were champions of the MEAC tournament, winning the championship game over Morgan State, to earn an automatic bid to the 1984 NCAA tournament where they were defeated by Morehead State, 70–69, in the play-in round.

== Roster ==
1983–84 North Carolina A&T Aggies men's basketball team
Players
Coaches

Pos.	#	Name	Height	Weight	Year	Hometown
G		George Cale	6 ft 6 in (1.98 m)	—	Fr
F	25	Joe Binion	6 ft 8 in (2.03 m)	230 lb (104 kg)	Sr	Rochester, New York
G	34	Eric Boyd	6 ft 4 in (1.93 m)	—	Jr

Head coach

- Don Corbett

Assistant coach(es)

Legend

- (C) Team captain
- (S) Suspended
- (I) Ineligible
- (W) Walk-on
- Injured
- Current redshirt

== Schedule and results ==
Date time, TV	Rank^{#}	Opponent^{#}	Result	Record	Site (attendance) city, state
Regular season
Nov 28, 1983*		at Michigan	L 55–71	0–1	Crisler Arena (10,805); Ann Arbor, Michigan
Nov 30, 1983*		at Detroit Mercy	L 66–75	0–2	Calihan Hall; Detroit, Michigan
Dec 10, 1983*		at UNC Wilmington	W 70–58	1–2	Trask Coliseum; Wilmington, North Carolina
Dec 20, 1983*		at No. 13 NC State	L 71–84	1–3	Reynolds Coliseum; Raleigh, North Carolina
Dec 28, 1983*		vs. Appalachian State	W 75–63	2–3	
Dec 29, 1983*		vs. UNC Wilmington	W 65–54	3–3	
1984 MEAC tournament
Mar 9, 1984*		vs. Delaware State; Semifinals	W 70–62	21–6	Greensboro Coliseum; Greensboro, North Carolina
Mar 10, 1984*		vs. Howard; Championship game	W 65–58	22–6	Greensboro Coliseum; Greensboro, North Carolina
1984 NCAA tournament
Mar 13, 1984*	(12 ME)	vs. (12 ME) Morehead State; Play-in Game	L 69–70	22–7	University of Dayton Arena; Dayton, Ohio
*Non-conference game. ^{#}Rankings from AP Poll. (#) Tournament seedings in parentheses. ME=Mideast. All times are in Eastern Time.

== Awards and honors ==
- Joe Binion – MEAC Player of the Year
