= 1984 AMCU-8 men's basketball tournament =

1984 Association of Mid-Continent Universities men's basketball tournament
- Classification: Division I
- Season: 1983–84
- Teams: 8
- Site: John Q. Hammons Student Center; Springfield, Missouri
- Champions: Western Illinois (1st title)
- Winning coach: Jack Margenthaler (1st title)
- MVP: Todd Hutcheson (Western Illinois)
- Association of Mid-Continent Universities men's basketball tournaments

1983–84 AMCU-8 Conference men's basketball standings
	Conf.				Overall
Team	W		L	PCT	W		L	PCT
Illinois–Chicago	12	–	2	.857	22	–	7	.759
Northern Iowa	10	–	4	.714	18	–	10	.643
Southwest Missouri State	9	–	5	.643	18	–	10	.643
Eastern Illinois	7	–	7	.500	15	–	13	.536
Western Illinois †	6	–	8	.429	17	–	13	.567
Wisconsin–Green Bay	5	–	9	.357	9	–	19	.321
Cleveland State	4	–	10	.286	14	–	16	.467
Valparaiso	3	–	11	.214	9	–	19	.321
† 1984 AMCU-8 tournament winner Rankings from AP Poll

The 1984 AMCU-8 men's basketball tournament was held March 8–10, 1984 at the John Q. Hammons Student Center at Southwest Missouri State University in Springfield, Missouri. This was the first edition of the tournament for the Association of Mid-Continent Universities, now known as the Summit League.

Western Illinois defeated Cleveland State in the title game, 73–64, to win their first AMCU-8 League championship. However, the Leathernecks did not earn a bid to the 1984 NCAA Division I men's basketball tournament.

== Format ==
All eight conference members qualified for the tournament. First round seedings were based on regular season record.

== Bracket ==
Quarterfinals; Thursday, March 8
1	Illinois–Chicago	66
8	Valparaiso	46
4	Eastern Illinois	65
5	Western Illinois	81
2	Northern Iowa	79
7	Cleveland State	93
3	Southwest Missouri State	58
6	Wisconsin–Green Bay	51

Semifinals; Friday, March 9
1	Illinois–Chicago	67
5	Western Illinois	87
7	Cleveland State	59
3	Southwest Missouri State	58

Final; Saturday, March 10
5	Western Illinois	73
7	Cleveland State	64
