= Reggie Minton =

American basketball coach (born 1941)

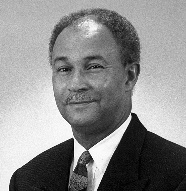

Biographical details
- Born: June 10, 1941 (age 85)

Playing career
- 1959–1963: Wooster
- Position: Forward

Coaching career (HC unless noted)
- 1969–1983: Air Force (assistant)
- 1983–1984: Dartmouth
- 1984–2000: Air Force

Head coaching record
- Overall: 161–311

William Reginald Minton (born June 10, 1941) is an American retired basketball coach. He served as the men's basketball head coach at Dartmouth College in 1984 and at the United States Air Force Academy from 1985 to 2000. From 2000 to 2020, he was deputy executive director of the National Association of Basketball Coaches.

== Head coaching record ==
Record table
Season	Team	Overall	Conference	Standing	Postseason
Dartmouth Big Green (Ivy League) (1983–1984)
1983–84	Dartmouth	11–15	6–8	T–5th	
Air Force Falcons (Western Athletic Conference) (1984–1999)
1984–85	Air Force	8–20	2–14	9th	
1985–86	Air Force	10–19	3–13	8th	
1986–87	Air Force	12–15	5–11	7th	
1987–88	Air Force	11–17	4–12	8th	
1988–89	Air Force	14–14	6–10	T–6th	
1989–90	Air Force	12–20	3–13	9th	
1990–91	Air Force	9–20	2–14	9th	
1991–92	Air Force	9–20	3–13	8th	
1992–93	Air Force	9–19	3–15	T–9th	
1993–94	Air Force	8–18	3–15	10th	
1994–95	Air Force	8–20	4–14	10th	
1995–96	Air Force	5–23	1–17	10th	
1996–97	Air Force	7–19	2–14	8th (Pacific)	
1997–98	Air Force	10–16	2–12	8th (Mountain)	
1998–99	Air Force	10–16	2–12	8th (Mountain)	
Air Force Falcons (Mountain West Conference) (1999–2000)
1999–00	Air Force	8–20	4–10	7th	
Air Force:		150–296	49–299		
Total:		161–311			
