= 1984 National Invitation Tournament =

Annual NCAA college basketball competition

- Season: 1983–84
- Teams: 32
- Finals site: Madison Square Garden, New York City
- Champions: Michigan Wolverines (1st title)
- Runner-up: Notre Dame Fighting Irish (2nd title game)
- Semifinalists: Virginia Tech Hokies (2nd semifinal); Southwestern Louisiana Ragin' Cajuns (1st semifinal)
- Winning coach: Bill Frieder (1st title)
- MVP: Tim McCormick (Michigan)

The 1984 National Invitation Tournament was the 1984 edition of the annual NCAA college basketball competition.

== Selected teams ==
Below is a list of the 32 teams selected for the tournament.

- Boston College
- Chattanooga
- Creighton
- Florida
- Florida State
- Fordham
- Georgia
- Georgia Tech
- Iowa State
- Lamar
- La Salle
- Marquette
- Michigan
- Nebraska
- New Mexico
- North Carolina State
- Notre Dame
- Ohio State
- Old Dominion
- Oregon
- Pittsburgh
- Saint Joseph's
- Saint Peter's
- Santa Clara
- South Alabama
- Southwestern Louisiana
- Tennessee
- Utah State
- Virginia Tech
- Weber State
- Wichita State
- Xavier

== Bracket ==
The four first-round brackets, along with the four-team championship bracket:

First Round
Southwestern Louisiana	94
Utah State	92
Weber State	75
Fordham	63
Lamar	64
New Mexico	61
Santa Clara	66
Oregon	53

Second Round
Southwestern Louisiana	74
Weber State	72
Lamar	74
Santa Clara	76

Quarterfinals
Southwestern Louisiana	97
Santa Clara	76

First Round
Florida State	74
NC State	71
Pittsburgh	95
La Salle	91
Boston College	75
Saint Joseph's	63
Notre Dame	67
Old Dominion	62

Second Round
Florida State	63
Pittsburgh	66
Boston College	52
Notre Dame	66

Quarterfinals
Pittsburgh	64
Notre Dame	72

First Round
Michigan	94
Wichita State	70
Marquette	73
Iowa State	53
Xavier	60
Ohio State	57
Nebraska	56
Creighton	54

Second Round
Michigan	83
Marquette	70
Xavier	58
Nebraska	57

Quarterfinals
Michigan	63
Xavier	62

First Round
Virginia Tech	77
Georgia Tech	74
South Alabama	88
Florida	87
Tennessee	54
Saint Peter's	40
Chattanooga	74
Georgia	69

Second Round
Virginia Tech	68
South Alabama	66
Tennessee	68
Chattanooga	66

Quarterfinals
Virginia Tech	72
Tennessee	68

=== Semifinals & finals ===
Semifinals
Southwestern Louisiana	59
Notre Dame	65
Michigan	78
Virginia Tech	75

Finals
Notre Dame	63
Michigan	83

Third place game
Southwestern Louisiana	70
Virginia Tech	71

== See also ==
- 1984 National Women's Invitational Tournament
- 1984 NCAA Division I men's basketball tournament
- 1984 NCAA Division II men's basketball tournament
- 1984 NCAA Division III men's basketball tournament
- 1984 NCAA Division I women's basketball tournament
- 1984 NCAA Division II women's basketball tournament
- 1984 NCAA Division III women's basketball tournament
- 1984 NAIA Division I men's basketball tournament
- 1984 NAIA Division I women's basketball tournament
