= 1983–84 Michigan State Spartans men's basketball team =

American college basketball season

1983–84 Michigan State Spartans men's basketball

Spartan Cutlass Classic champions
- Conference: Big Ten Conference
- Record: 16–12 (9–9 Big Ten)
- Head coach: Jud Heathcote (8th season)
- Assistant coaches: Tom Izzo; Silas Taylor; Mike Deane
- Captains: Ben Tower; Kevin Willis
- Home arena: Jenison Fieldhouse

1983–84 Big Ten Conference men's basketball standings
	Conf.				Overall
Team	W		L	PCT	W		L	PCT
No. 6 Illinois	15	–	3	.833	26	–	5	.839
No. 10 Purdue	15	–	3	.833	22	–	7	.759
Indiana	13	–	5	.722	22	–	9	.710
Michigan	10	–	8	.556	24	–	9	.727
Michigan State	8	–	10	.444	15	–	13	.536
Ohio State	8	–	10	.444	15	–	14	.517
Northwestern	5	–	13	.278	14	–	14	.500
Minnesota	6	–	12	.333	15	–	13	.536
Iowa	6	–	12	.333	13	–	15	.464
Wisconsin*	0	–	18	.000	0	–	28	.000
Rankings from AP Poll; *Wisconsin forfeited all games due to NCAA sanctions. Disputed record (4–14, 8–20)

The 1983–84 Michigan State Spartans men's basketball team represented Michigan State University in the 1983–84 NCAA Division I men's basketball season. The team played their home games at Jenison Field House in East Lansing, Michigan and were members of the Big Ten Conference. They were coached by Jud Heathcote in his eighth year at Michigan State. The Spartans finished with a record of 15–13, 8–10 to finish in a tie for fifth place in Big Ten play.

Due to NCAA sanctions against Wisconsin for providing improper benefits for players, MSU's official record for the year is 16–12, 9–9.

The season is notable as the first season future Spartan head coach Tom Izzo was an official assistant coach under Heathcote.

== Previous season ==
The Spartans finished the 1982–83 season with a record of 17–13, 9–9 to finish in sixth place in Big Ten play. The Spartans received an invitation to the National Invitation Tournament where they defeated Bowling Green State before losing to Fresno State.

== Roster and statistics ==
1983–84 Michigan State Spartans men's basketball team
No	Name	Pos	Year	Height	Pts	Reb	Ast
4	Scott Skiles	G	SO	6–1	14.5	2.2	4.6
11	Sam Vincent	G	JR	6–2	15.6	2.7	3.0
42	Kevin Willis	C	SR	7–0	11.0	7.7	0.3
35	Larry Polec	F	JR	6–8	6.0	3.9	0.9
13	Darryl Johnson	G	FR	6–2	6.0	1.1	1.2
00	Ken Johnson	F	JR	6–8	8.5	6.9	0.2
20	Ben Tower	F	SR	6–8	5.8	4.5	1.4
44	Patrick Ford	G/F	SO	6–5	6.1	2.2	0.5
15	Ralph Walker	F	SO	6–8	1.7	1.1	0.3
24	Richard Mudd	F/C	SR	6–9	1.0	2.2	0.1
21	Greg Pedro	G	FR	6–4	1.0	0.3	0.2
40	Barry Fordham	F	FR	6–8	0.5	0.4	0.0
10	Tim Gore	G	SR	6–4	0.2	0.3	0.2

== Schedule and results ==
Date time, TV	Rank^{#}	Opponent^{#}	Result	Record	Site city, state
Regular season
Nov 25, 1983*	No. 12	Central Michigan; Spartan Cutlass Classic	W 73–52	1–0	Jenison Field House; East Lansing, MI
Nov 26, 1983*	No. 12	Western Michigan; Spartan Cutlass Classic	W 81–52	2–0	Jenison Field House; East Lansing, MI
Dec 1, 1983*	No. 11	vs. Saint Peter's	L 66–73	2–1	
Dec 3, 1983*	No. 11	Illinois-Chicago	W 99–82	3–1	Jenison Field House; East Lansing
Dec 12, 1983*	No. 17	at Cleveland State	W 71–62	4–1	Woodling Gym; Cleveland, OH
Dec 15, 1983*	No. 17	Brooklyn	W 85–72	5–1	Jenison Field House; East Lansing. MI
Dec 22, 1983*	No. 19	at Missouri	L 66–79	5–2	Hearnes Center; Columbia, MO
Dec 28, 1983*		vs. Alabama; Cotton States Classic semifinal	L 69–81	5–3	The Omni; Atlanta, GA
Dec 29, 1983*		vs. Nebraska; Cotton States Classic third place game	W 58–45	6–3	The Omni; Atlanta, GA
Jan 4, 1984		Iowa	W 73–72	7–3 (1–0)	Jenison Field House; East Lansing, MI
Jan 7, 1984		Northwestern	L 69–76	7–4 (1–1)	Jenison Field House; East Lansing, MI
Jan 12, 1984		at Wisconsin	L 74–81†	7–5 (1–2)	Wisconsin Field House; Madison, WI
Jan 14, 1984		at Minnesota	L 61–69	7–6 (1–3)	Williams Arena; Minneapolis, MN
Jan 19, 1984		Indiana	L 62–70 ^{OT}	7–7 (1–4)	Jenison Field House; East Lansing, MI
Jan 21, 1984		Ohio State	L 68–82	7–8 (1–5)	Jenison Field House; East Lansing, MI
Jan 26, 1984		No. 9 Illinois	L 40–46	7–9 (1–6)	Assembly Hall; Champaign, IL
Jan 28, 1984		Purdue	L 54–72	7–10 (1–7)	Mackey Arena; West Lafayette, IN
Feb 2, 1984		Michigan; Rivalry	W 72–67	8–10 (2–7)	Jenison Field House; East Lansing, MI
Feb 5, 1984*		Oregon State	W 56–55	9–10	Jenison Field House; East Lansing, MI
Feb 11, 1984		Michigan; Rivalry	L 61–71	9–11 (2–8)	Crisler Arena; Ann Arbor, MI
Feb 16, 1984		No. 11 Purdue	W 63–42	10–11 (3–8)	Jenison Field House; East Lansing, MI
Feb 19, 1984		No. 7 Illinois	L 53–70	10–12 (3–9)	Jenison Field House; East Lansing, MI
Feb 22, 1984		Ohio State	L 70–86	10–13 (3–10)	St. John Arena; Columbus, OH
Feb 26, 1984		Indiana	W 57–54	11–13 (4–10)	Assembly Hall; Bloomington, IN
Mar 1, 1984		Minnesota	W 83–62	12–13 (5–10)	Jenison Field House; East Lansing, MI
Mar 3, 1984		Wisconsin	W 78–59	13–13 (6–10)	Jenison Field House; East Lansing, MI
Mar 8, 1984		Northwestern	W 63–55	14–13 (7–10)	Welsh-Ryan Arena; Evanston, IL
Mar 11, 1984		Iowa	W 51–44	15–13 (8–10)	Carver-Hawkeye Arena; Iowa City, IA
*Non-conference game. ^{#}Rankings from AP Poll,. (#) Tournament seedings in parentheses. All times are in Central Time Source †Game forfeited by Wisconsin due to NCAA violations at a later date.

== Awards and honors ==
- Sam Vincent – All-Big Ten First Team
