= Mike Hanks =

American college basketball coach

Biographical details
- Born: 1952 or 1953 (age 73–74)
- Education: Southern Methodist University

Coaching career (HC unless noted)
- 1981–1984: Samford
- 1984–1987: South Alabama
- 1994–1996: Manchester Giants
- 1996–2001: Saint Leo

Mike Hanks (born 1952 or 1953) is an American college basketball coach. He was head coach for Saint Leo University, Manchester Giants, University of South Alabama and Samford University. He also served as an assistant under Bob Knight at Indiana University.

== Coaching career ==
=== Indiana University ===
Hanks served as a graduate assistant basketball coach for Indiana University from 1975 to 1976. Indiana was coached by the Hall of Fame coach, Bob Knight. Indiana won the NCAA tournament, compiling an undefeated season.

=== University of Mississippi ===
Hanks served as an assistant basketball coach for the Ole Miss Rebels and head coach Bob Weltlich from 1976 to 1981. During this time Ole Miss competed in the school's first-ever postseason NIT Tournament in school history (1980), first-ever NCAA Tournament (1981) and won the school's first-ever and only SEC Tournament Championship (1981).

=== Samford ===
Hanks was head coach at Samford from 1981 to 1984. During his tenure as head coach, Samford won 20 games for the first time in school history (1984). Hanks was named as the Trans America Conference Coach of the Year and the Birmingham Tip-Off Club Coach of the Year (1984). He compiled a 46–38 (.548) record.

=== USA Select Basketball Team, Head Basketball Coach 1983 ===
This was a Pre-Olympic (1984) team selected to compete in tournaments in Korea, South Pacific and versus the Pan American Basketball Team in Manhattan, Kansas. The USA Team won championships in both tournaments.

=== USA Assistant Basketball Coach IX FIBA World Championships ===
Silver Medalist, Cali, Colombia, South America

=== South Alabama ===
From 1984 to 1987, Hanks prowled the sidelines as head coach at South Alabama and garnered a 45–43 (.511) record.

In March 1987, Mike Hanks refused to resign as South Alabama's basketball coach with two years remaining in his contract and refused other options offered by the school. He was dismissed by Joe Gottfried, the school's athletic director. Hanks was in the third year of a five-year contract. In Hanks's three seasons at South Alabama his teams finished 15–13, 16–16 and 14–14.

=== UAB (University of Alabama at Birmingham) ===
Hanks served as an assistant basketball coach (1987–1988) under Hall of Fame coach Gene Bartow

=== Florida International University ===
Hanks served as an assistant basketball coach (1989–1990) under head coach Bob Weltlich

=== Cocodrilos de Caracas ===
Hanks served as head coach and director of sports for the Crocodiles of Caracas, Venezuela. He compiled a franchise record wins (39–16), league championship and tournament championship (1992). The Cocodrilos were selected to compete in the South American Cup (1993)

=== Manchester Giants ===
The owners of the British Basketball League Manchester Giants were putting together a new look team and brought in United States college coach Mike Hanks for the start of the '94–95 season. Although they only finished fourth and fifth in Coach Hanks' two seasons, the Giants were play-off runners-up, losing the Wembley Championship Final to Worthing by a narrow 77–73 (1995). The Giants were semi-finalist, Wembley Championship (1996). The Giants were selected for the European Cup in both 1995 and advancing to the second round (1996)

=== Saint Leo ===
Hanks distinguished himself as the school's most successful basketball coach, setting school records for the most wins in a season, highest conference finish and most wins to start a season. For five seasons (1996–2001) Hanks was the head coach at Saint Leo and compiled a 66–70 (.485) record. Hanks tendered his resignation in March 2001.

=== US National Team ===
On temporary assignment from Samford, Hanks served as an assistant coach to then Texas coach, Bob Weltlich for the US national team in the 1982 FIBA World Championship, winning the silver medal in Cali, Colombia.

In 1983 Hanks coached the USA Select Basketball Team to a 12–0 record in Asia.
