= 1983–84 Wisconsin Badgers men's basketball team =

American college basketball season

1983–84 Wisconsin Badgers men's basketball
- Conference: Big Ten Conference
- Record: 8–20 (4–14 Big Ten)
- Head coach: Steve Yoder (2nd season)
- Home arena: UW Fieldhouse

1983–84 Big Ten Conference men's basketball standings
| | Conf. | | | | Overall |
| Team | W | | L | PCT | W | | L | PCT |
|---|---|---|---|---|---|---|---|---|
| No. 6 Illinois | 15 | – | 3 | .833 | 26 | – | 5 | .839 |
| No. 10 Purdue | 15 | – | 3 | .833 | 22 | – | 7 | .759 |
| Indiana | 13 | – | 5 | .722 | 22 | – | 9 | .710 |
| Michigan | 10 | – | 8 | .556 | 24 | – | 9 | .727 |
| Michigan State | 8 | – | 10 | .444 | 15 | – | 13 | .536 |
| Ohio State | 8 | – | 10 | .444 | 15 | – | 14 | .517 |
| Northwestern | 5 | – | 13 | .278 | 14 | – | 14 | .500 |
| Minnesota | 6 | – | 12 | .333 | 15 | – | 13 | .536 |
| Iowa | 6 | – | 12 | .333 | 13 | – | 15 | .464 |
| Wisconsin* | 0 | – | 18 | .000 | 0 | – | 28 | .000 |
Rankings from AP Poll; *Wisconsin forfeited all games due to NCAA sanctions. Disputed record (4–14, 8–20)

The 1983–84 Wisconsin Badgers men's basketball team represented University of Wisconsin–Madison. The head coach was Steve Yoder, coaching his second season with the Badgers. The team played their home games at the UW Fieldhouse in Madison, Wisconsin and was a member of the Big Ten Conference.

== Roster ==
1983–84 Wisconsin Badgers men's basketball team
Players
Coaches

| Pos. | # | Name | Height | Weight | Year | Hometown |
|---|---|---|---|---|---|---|
| G | 10 | Mike Heineman | 6 ft 3 in (1.91 m) | 185 lb (84 kg) | Fr | Connersville, Indiana |
| G | 12 | Rick Olson | 6 ft 1 in (1.85 m) | 165 lb (75 kg) | So | Madison, Wisconsin |
| G | 20 | David Miller | 6 ft 4 in (1.93 m) | 180 lb (82 kg) | So | Chicago, Illinois |
| F | 22 | Jack Hippen | 6 ft 7 in (2.01 m) | 205 lb (93 kg) | Jr | Chadwick, Illinois |
| F | 30 | Cory Blackwell | 6 ft 6 in (1.98 m) | 215 lb (98 kg) | Jr | Chicago, Illinois |
| F | 32 | Scott Roth | 6 ft 7 in (2.01 m) | 200 lb (91 kg) | Jr | Brecksville, Ohio |
| G/F | 34 | Jim Smith | 6 ft 6 in (1.98 m) | 170 lb (77 kg) | So | Toledo, Ohio |
| F | 40 | J.J. Weber | 6 ft 7 in (2.01 m) | 215 lb (98 kg) | Fr | Wales, Wisconsin |
| F | 41 | Don Peterson | 6 ft 6 in (1.98 m) | 210 lb (95 kg) | So | Mt. Horeb, Wisconsin |
| F | 42 | Rod Ripley | 6 ft 7 in (2.01 m) | 175 lb (79 kg) | Fr | Pulaski, Wisconsin |
| F | 44 | Gregg Steinhaus | 6 ft 8 in (2.03 m) | 185 lb (84 kg) | So | Portage, Wisconsin |
| C | 50 | John Ploss | 6 ft 9 in (2.06 m) | 220 lb (100 kg) | Jr | Antioch, Illinois |
| F/C | 52 | Scott Plondke | 6 ft 10 in (2.08 m) | 225 lb (102 kg) | Fr | Prairie du Chien, Wisconsin |
| F | 54 | Jay Laszewski | 6 ft 8 in (2.03 m) | 190 lb (86 kg) | So | Stevens Point, Wisconsin |

Head coach

- Steve Yoder (Illinois Wesleyan)

Assistant coach(es)

- Rick Bowen (Indiana)
- Brad McNulty (Purdue)
- Bo Ryan (Wilkes)

Legend

- (C) Team captain
- (S) Suspended
- (I) Ineligible
- (W) Walk-on
- Injured
- Current redshirt

== Schedule ==
| Date time, TV | Rank^{#} | Opponent^{#} | Result | Record | Site city, state |
Regular Season
| 11/26/1983* | | Florida A&M | W 100–56 | 1–0 | UW Fieldhouse; Madison, WI |
| 12/1/1983* | | Northern Iowa | L 59–60 | 1–1 | UNI-Dome; Cedar Falls, IA |
| 12/3/1983* | | Southern Illinois | W 78–72 | 2–1 | UW Fieldhouse; Madison, WI |
| 12/5/1983* | | Nebraska | L 69–71 ^{2OT} | 2–2 | UW Fieldhouse; Madison, WI |
| 12/7/1983* | | Northern Illinois | W 90–68 | 3–2 | UW Fieldhouse; Madison, WI |
| 12/10/1983* | | at Kansas State | L 64–71 | 3–3 | Ahearn Field House; Manhattan, KS |
| 12/20/1983* | | at Toledo | L 60–73 | 3–4 | Centennial Hall; Toledo, OH |
| 12/29/1983* | | vs. Oklahoma State; Merrill Lynch Classic | L 84–89 | 3–5 | UD Arena; Dayton, OH |
| 12/30/1983* | | vs. Yale; Merrill Lynch Classic | W 87–77 | 4–5 | UD Arena; Dayton, OH |
| 1/5/1983 | | Purdue | L 65–84 | 4–6 (0–1) | Mackey Arena; West Lafayette, IN |
| 1/7/1984 | | No. 14 Illinois | L 62–63 ^{OT} | 4–7 (0–2) | UW Fieldhouse; Madison, WI |
| 1/12/1984 | | Michigan State | W 81–74 | 5–7 (1–2) | UW Fieldhouse; Madison, WI |
| 1/14/1984 | | Michigan | W 71–64 | 6–7 (2–2) | UW Fieldhouse; Madison, WI |
| 1/19/1984 | | at Northwestern | W 61–60 ^{OT} | 7–7 (3–2) | Welsh–Ryan Arena; Evanston, IL |
| 1/21/1984 | | at Iowa | L 62–75 | 7–8 (3–3) | Carver–Hawkeye Arena; Iowa City, IA |
| 1/25/1984 | | at Minnesota | L 62–75 | 7–9 (3–4) | Williams Arena; Minneapolis, MN |
| 2/2/1984 | | Ohio State | L 74–85 | 7–10 (3–5) | UW Fieldhouse; Madison, WI |
| 2/4/1984 | | Indiana | L 67–81 | 7–11 (3–6) | UW Fieldhouse; Madison, WI |
| 2/9/1984 | | at Indiana | L 64–74 | 7–12 (3–7) | Assembly Hall; Bloomington, IN |
| 2/11/1984 | | at Ohio State | L 65–71 | 7–13 (3–8) | St. John Arena; Columbus, OH |
| 2/15/1984 | | Minnesota | L 67–68 | 7–14 (3–9) | UW Fieldhouse; Madison, WI |
| 2/16/1984* | | at Marquette | L 59–74 | 7–15 | MECCA Arena; Milwaukee, WI |
| 2/23/1984 | | Iowa | L 55–63 | 7–16 (3–10) | UW Fieldhouse; Madison, WI |
| 2/26/1984 | | Northwestern | W 54–47 | 8–16 (4–10) | UW Fieldhouse; Madison, WI |
| 3/1/1984 | | at Michigan | L 75–84 | 8–17 (4–11) | Crisler Arena; Ann Arbor, MI |
| 3/3/1984 | | at Michigan State | L 59–78 | 8–18 (4–12) | Breslin Center; East Lansing, MI |
| 3/6/1984 | | No. 11 Purdue | L 48–61 | 8–19 (4–13) | UW Fieldhouse; Madison, WI |
| 3/10/1984 | | at No. 7 Illinois | L 57–81 | 8–20 (4–14) | Assembly Hall; Champaign, IL |
*Non-conference game. ^{#}Rankings from AP Poll. (#) Tournament seedings in parentheses.
