= Nelson Catalina =

American college basketball coach

Biographical details
- Born: December 9, 1950 (age 75)

Coaching career (HC unless noted)
- 1979–1984: Arkansas State (assistant)
- 1984–1995: Arkansas State

Head coaching record
- Overall: 188–139

Nelson Catalina (born December 9, 1950) is an American college basketball coach. He was the head coach at Arkansas State University from 1984 to 1995.
