= 1983–84 Iowa Hawkeyes men's basketball team =

American college basketball season

1983–84 Iowa Hawkeyes men's basketball

Amana-Hawkeye Classic Champions Winston Tire Classic Champions
- Conference: Big Ten Conference
- Record: 13–15 (6–12 Big Ten)
- Head coach: George Raveling (1st season)
- Assistant coach: Joedy Gardner
- MVP: Steve Carfino
- Home arena: Carver-Hawkeye Arena (Capacity: 15,500)

1983–84 Big Ten Conference men's basketball standings
	Conf.				Overall
Team	W		L	PCT	W		L	PCT
No. 6 Illinois	15	–	3	.833	26	–	5	.839
No. 10 Purdue	15	–	3	.833	22	–	7	.759
Indiana	13	–	5	.722	22	–	9	.710
Michigan	10	–	8	.556	24	–	9	.727
Michigan State	8	–	10	.444	15	–	13	.536
Ohio State	8	–	10	.444	15	–	14	.517
Northwestern	5	–	13	.278	14	–	14	.500
Minnesota	6	–	12	.333	15	–	13	.536
Iowa	6	–	12	.333	13	–	15	.464
Wisconsin*	0	–	18	.000	0	–	28	.000
Rankings from AP Poll; *Wisconsin forfeited all games due to NCAA sanctions. Disputed record (4–14, 8–20)

The 1983–84 Iowa Hawkeyes men's basketball team represented the University of Iowa as members of the Big Ten Conference. The team was led by first-year head coach George Raveling and played their home games at Carver-Hawkeye Arena. They finished the season 13–15 and 6–12 in Big Ten play, tied for eighth place.

== Previous season ==
The Hawkeyes finished the 1982–83 season at 21–10 overall, fifth in the Big Ten at 10–8. Iowa received an at-large bid to the NCAA tournament as the seventh seed in the Midwest regional. After wins over Utah State and second seed Missouri, they lost to third-seeded Villanova in the Sweet Sixteen.

Following the season, ninth-year head coach Lute Olson left for Arizona, and was succeeded in April 1983 by Raveling, who had led Washington State for eleven years.

== Roster ==
1983–84 Iowa Hawkeyes men's basketball team
Players
Coaches

Pos.	#	Name	Height	Weight	Year	Hometown
F/C	3	Gerry Wright	6 ft 7 in (2.01 m)	—	Fr	San Bernardino, California
G	4	Andre Banks	6 ft 4 in (1.93 m)	—	So	Chicago, Illinois
G	11	Kenny Fullard	5 ft 11 in (1.8 m)	—	Jr	Raytown, Missouri
G	15	Steve Carfino	6 ft 2 in (1.88 m)	—	Sr	Los Angeles, California
G	25	Todd Berkenpas	6 ft 2 in (1.88 m)	—	Jr	Mapleton, Iowa
F	32	Dave Snedeker	6 ft 8 in (2.03 m)	—	Fr	Springfield, Illinois
F	34	Craig Anderson	6 ft 7 in (2.01 m)	—	Sr	Madison, Wisconsin
F	35	Bryan Boyle	—	—	So
F/C	41	Greg Stokes	6 ft 10 in (2.08 m)	—	Jr	Hamilton, Ohio
C	42	Michael Payne	6 ft 11 in (2.11 m)	—	Jr	Quincy, Illinois
G		Waymond King	6 ft 1 in (1.85 m)	—	Sr	Kansas City, Missouri
F/C	54	Brad Lohaus	6 ft 11 in (2.11 m)	—	So	Phoenix, Arizona

Head coach

- George Raveling (Villanova)

Assistant coach(es)

- Joedy Gardner (West Virginia)

Legend

- (C) Team captain
- (S) Suspended
- (I) Ineligible
- (W) Walk-on
- Injured
- Current redshirt

== Schedule/results ==
Date time, TV	Rank^{#}	Opponent^{#}	Result	Record	Site city, state
Non-conference regular season
11/26/1983*	No. 7	Illinois Wesleyan	W 86–60	1–0	Carver-Hawkeye Arena (15,450); Iowa City, IA
12/2/1983*	No. 5	Baylor; Amana-Hawkeye Classic	W 67–44	2–0	Carver-Hawkeye Arena (15,450); Iowa City, IA
12/3/1983*	No. 5	No. 10 Oregon State; Amana-Hawkeye Classic	W 56–45	3–0	Carver-Hawkeye Arena (15,450); Iowa City, IA
12/7/1983*	No. 5	at Louisville	L 58–79	3–1	Freedom Hall; Louisville, KY
12/10/1983*	No. 5	at No. 18 Oregon State	L 49–53	3–2	Gill Coliseum (10,000); Corvallis, OR
12/19/1983*	No. 18	Colorado	W 72–56	4–2	Carver-Hawkeye Arena; Iowa City, IA
12/21/1983*		Drake	W 66–43	5–2	Carver-Hawkeye Arena; Iowa City, IA
12/29/1983*		at USC; Winston Tire Classic	W 62–61	6–2	Los Angeles Memorial Sports Arena; Los Angeles, CA
12/30/1983*		vs. No. 17 Memphis State; Winston Tire Classic	W 56–45	7–2	Los Angeles Memorial Sports Arena; Los Angeles, CA
Big Ten regular season
1/4/1984		at Michigan State	L 72–73	7–3 (0–1)	Jenison Fieldhouse; East Lansing, MI
1/7/1984		at Michigan	L 49–53	7–4 (0–2)	Crisler Arena; Ann Arbor, MI
1/12/1984		Northwestern	W 42–39	8–4 (1–2)	Iowa Field House; Iowa City, IA
1/14/1984*		Iowa State; Rivalry	L 72–76 ^{2OT}	8–5 (1–2)	Hilton Coliseum (14,408); Ames, IA
1/19/1984		Minnesota	L 49–56	8–6 (1–3)	Iowa Field House; Iowa City, IA
1/21/1984		Wisconsin	W 75–62	9–6 (2–3)	Iowa Field House; Iowa City, IA
1/26/1984		at Ohio State	L 54–65	9–7 (2–4)	St. John Arena; Columbus, OH
1/28/1984		at Indiana	L 47–54	9–8 (2–5)	Assembly Hall; Bloomington, IN
2/2/1984		No. 8 Illinois	L 52–54	9–9 (2–6)	Iowa Field House; Iowa City, IA
2/4/1984		No. 16 Purdue	L 46–48	9–10 (2–7)	Iowa Field House; Iowa City, IA
2/9/1984		No. 11 Purdue	L 58–79	9–11 (2–8)	Mackey Arena; West Lafayette, IN
2/12/1984		at No. 8 Illinois	L 53–73	9–12 (2–9)	Assembly Hall; Champaign, IL
2/16/1984		No. 17 Indiana	L 45–49	9–13 (2–10)	Carver-Hawkeye Arena; Iowa City, IA
2/18/1984		Ohio State	W 74–60	10–13 (3–10)	Carver-Hawkeye Arena; Iowa City, IA
1/21/1984		at Wisconsin	W 63–55	11–13 (4–10)	Wisconsin Field House; Madison, WI
2/25/1984		at Minnesota	W 62–50	12–13 (5–10)	Williams Arena; Minneapolis, MN
3/1/1984		at Northwestern	W 57–48	13–13 (6–10)	Welsh-Ryan Arena; Evanston, IL
3/7/1984		Michigan	L 46–53	13–14 (6–11)	Iowa Field House; Iowa City, IA
3/11/1984		Michigan State	L 44–51	13–15 (6–12)	Iowa Field House; Iowa City, IA
*Non-conference game. ^{#}Rankings from AP Poll. (#) Tournament seedings in parentheses.
