= 1983–84 Illinois Fighting Illini men's basketball team =

American college basketball season

1983–84 Illinois Fighting Illini men's basketball

Big Ten Conference co-champions

NCAA men's Division I tournament, Elite Eight
- Conference: Big Ten Conference

Ranking
- Coaches: No. 6
- AP: No. 6
- Record: 26–5 (15–3 Big Ten)
- Head coach: Lou Henson (9th season)
- Assistant coaches: Dick Nagy (5th season); Jimmy Collins (1st season); Bob Hull (4th season)
- MVPs: Bruce Douglas; Quinn Richardson
- Captain: Quinn Richardson
- Home arena: Assembly Hall

1983–84 Big Ten Conference men's basketball standings
	Conf.				Overall
Team	W		L	PCT	W		L	PCT
No. 6 Illinois	15	–	3	.833	26	–	5	.839
No. 10 Purdue	15	–	3	.833	22	–	7	.759
Indiana	13	–	5	.722	22	–	9	.710
Michigan	10	–	8	.556	24	–	9	.727
Michigan State	8	–	10	.444	15	–	13	.536
Ohio State	8	–	10	.444	15	–	14	.517
Northwestern	5	–	13	.278	14	–	14	.500
Minnesota	6	–	12	.333	15	–	13	.536
Iowa	6	–	12	.333	13	–	15	.464
Wisconsin*	0	–	18	.000	0	–	28	.000
Rankings from AP Poll; *Wisconsin forfeited all games due to NCAA sanctions. Disputed record (4–14, 8–20)

The 1983–84 Illinois Fighting Illini men's basketball team represented the University of Illiniois.

== Regular season ==
The 1983–84 season brought Illinois its 12th Big Ten Conference championship in a season where Illinois had four overtime games including an epic four-overtime 75–66 victory over Michigan. The next game was a two-overtime win at Iowa, Lou Henson’s 400th victory as a college head coach. The Illini recorded a 26-5 mark and were 15-3 in Big Ten play, tying Purdue for the league title. This season also marked Illinois’ first back-to-back 20 win seasons since 1951–52. The Illini would go on to record a total of nine consecutive 20-win seasons from 1982–83 to 1990–91. Illinois advanced to the NCAA Regional Finals before dropping a heart-breaking 54–51 loss to Kentucky on its home court, causing the NCAA to put a rule in place not allowing a school to play in a tournament game on its home court. Rumors also were floated that the outcome was predetermined, with home team time clock operations being implicated in part.

=== Roster ===
1983–84 Illinois Fighting Illini men's basketball team
Players
Coaches

Pos.	#	Name	Height	Weight	Year	Previous school	Hometown
G	10	Tony Wysinger	5 ft 10 in (1.78 m)	155 lb (70 kg)	Fr	Peoria Central High School	Peoria, Illinois
F	11	Tom Schafer	6 ft 7 in (2.01 m)	205 lb (93 kg)	Fr	Harry D. Jacobs High School	Algonquin, Illinois
F	15	B.J. Jenkins	6 ft 4 in (1.93 m)	175 lb (79 kg)	Fr	Palatine High School	Palatine, Illinois
G	21	Quinn Richardson (C)	5 ft 11 in (1.8 m)	175 lb (79 kg)	RS Sr	Eisenhower High School	Robbins, Illinois
G	22	Doug Altenberger	6 ft 4 in (1.93 m)	180 lb (82 kg)	So	Richwoods High School	Peoria, Illinois
F	23	George Montgomery	6 ft 8 in (2.03 m)	215 lb (98 kg)	Jr	Corliss High School	Chicago, Illinois
F	24	Efrem Winters	6 ft 9 in (2.06 m)	210 lb (95 kg)	So	King High School	Chicago, Illinois
G	25	Bruce Douglas	6 ft 3 in (1.91 m)	175 lb (79 kg)	So	Quincy Senior High School	Quincy, Illinois
F/C	30	Scott Meents	6 ft 9 in (2.06 m)	230 lb (104 kg)	So	Herscher High School	Kankakee, Illinois
F	31	Don Klusendorf	6 ft 6 in (1.98 m)	210 lb (95 kg)	Sr	Lyons Township High School	Western Springs, Illinois
F	32	Dragomir Marinkovich	6 ft 4 in (1.93 m)	195 lb (88 kg)	Jr	Lane Tech High School	Chicago, Illinois
G	33	Stephan Freeman	6 ft 2 in (1.88 m)	180 lb (82 kg)	So	Chicago Public Schools	Chicago, Illinois
F	34	Dee Maras	6 ft 7 in (2.01 m)	225 lb (102 kg)	Jr	Antioch Community High School	Antioch, Illinois
G	35	Reggie Woodward	6 ft 2 in (1.88 m)	170 lb (77 kg)	Jr	King High School	Chicago, Illinois
F	43	Tom Siegel	6 ft 5 in (1.96 m)	200 lb (91 kg)	Jr	Belleville High School-East	Belleville, Illinois
F	44	Anthony Welch (injured) (redshirt)	6 ft 9 in (2.06 m)	200 lb (91 kg)	Jr	Creston High School	Grand Rapids, Michigan

Head coach

- Lou Henson (New Mexico State University) (9th year)

Assistant coach(es)

- Jimmy Collins (New Mexico State) (1st year)
- Dick Nagy (Hardin-Simmons University) (5th year)
- Bob Hull (4th year)

Legend

- (C) Team captain
- (S) Suspended
- (I) Ineligible
- (W) Walk-on
- Injured
- Current redshirt

Roster

== Schedule ==
Date time, TV	Rank^{#}	Opponent^{#}	Result	Record	Site (attendance) city, state
Non-Conference regular season
11/25/1983*		vs. Utah; Tribune Charities Holiday Classic	W 99-65	1-0	Rosemont Horizon (5,463); Rosemont, IL
11/26/1983*		vs. Loyola (Chicago); Tribune Charities Holiday Classic	W 70-53	2-0	Rosemont Horizon (5,854); Rosemont, IL
12/2/1983*		Western Illinois; Illini Classic	W 65-49	3-0	Assembly Hall (10,365); Champaign, IL
12/3/1983*		Southern Mississippi; Illini Classic	W 78-47	4-0	Assembly Hall (11,841); Champaign, IL
12/6/1983*		at Vanderbilt	W 69-55	5-0	Memorial Gymnasium (15,204); Nashville, TN
12/10/1983*		West Texas State	W 69-58	6-0	Assembly Hall (10,430); Champaign, IL
12/12/1983*		Loyola (Chicago)	W 74-69	7-0	Assembly Hall (10,488); Champaign, IL
12/21/1983*		Cal State Northridge	W 78-57	8-0	Assembly Hall (8,253); Champaign, IL
12/24/1983*		No. 2 Kentucky	L 54-56	8-1	Assembly Hall (10,732); Champaign, IL
12/28/1983*	No. 20	vs. Missouri; Braggin' Rights	W 66-60	9-1	St. Louis Arena (17,844); St. Louis, MO
Big Ten regular season
1/5/1984	No. 14	Minnesota	W 80-53	10-1 (1-0)	Assembly Hall (11,012); Champaign, IL
1/7/1984	No. 14	at Wisconsin	W 63-62 ^{OT}	11-1 (2-0)	Wisconsin Field House (7,569); Madison, WI
1/11/1984	No. 9	at Indiana; Rivalry	L 68-73 ^{OT}	11-2 (2-1)	Assembly Hall (17,223); Bloomington, IN
1/14/1984	No. 9	at Ohio State	W 55-53	12-2 (3-1)	St. John Arena (12,657); Columbus, OH
1/21/1984	No. 10	No. 19 Purdue	W 76-52	13-2 (4-1)	Assembly Hall (16,166); Champaign, IL
1/26/1984	No. 9	Michigan State	W 46-40	14-2 (5-1)	Assembly Hall (14,035); Champaign, IL
1/28/1984	No. 9	Michigan	W 75-66 ^{4OT}	15-2 (6-1)	Assembly Hall (15,952); Champaign, IL
2/2/1984	No. 8	at Iowa; Rivalry	W 54-52 ^{2OT}	16-2 (7-1)	Carver-Hawkeye Arena (15,450); Iowa City, IA
2/4/1984	No. 8	at Northwestern; Rivalry	W 71-52	17-2 (8-1)	Welsh-Ryan Arena (8,117); Evanston, IL
2/8/1984	No. 8	Northwestern; Rivalry	W 73-49	18-2 (9-1)	Assembly Hall (11,513); Champaign, IL
2/12/1984	No. 8	Iowa; Rivalry	W 73-53	19-2 (10-1)	Assembly Hall (16,166); Champaign, IL
2/16/1984	No. 7	at Michigan	L 60-62	19-3 (10-2)	Crisler Center (13,511); Ann Arbor, MI
2/19/1984	No. 8	at Michigan State	W 70-53	20-3 (11-2)	Jenison Fieldhouse (10,004); East Lansing, MI
2/25/1984	No. 6	at No. 13 Purdue	L 55-59	20-4 (11-3)	Mackey Arena (14,123); West Lafayette, IN
3/1/1984	No. 10	Ohio State	W 73-58	21-4 (12-3)	Assembly Hall (14,911); Champaign, IL
3/4/1984	No. 10	Indiana; Rivalry	W 70-53	22-4 (13-3)	Assembly Hall (16,166); Champaign, IL
3/8/1984	No. 7	at Minnesota	W 53-41	23-4 (14-3)	Williams Arena (14,729); Minneapolis, MN
3/10/1984	No. 7	Wisconsin	W 81-57	24-4 (15-3)	Assembly Hall (16,116); Champaign, IL
NCAA Tournament
3/18/1984*	(2 ME) No. 6	vs. (7 ME) Villanova; Second Round	W 64-56	25-4	U.S. Cellular Arena (10,788); Milwaukee, WI
3/22/1984*	(2 ME) No. 6	vs. (3 ME) No. 11 Maryland; Regional semifinals	W 72-70	26-4	Rupp Arena (23,525); Lexington, KY
3/24/1984*	(2 ME) No. 6	at (1 ME) No. 3 Kentucky; Regional Finals	L 51-54	26-5	Rupp Arena (23,525); Lexington, KY
*Non-conference game. ^{#}Rankings from AP Poll. (#) Tournament seedings in parentheses. All times are in Central Time.

== Player stats ==
Player	Games Played	Minutes played	Field Goals	Free Throws	Rebounds	Assists	Blocks	Steals	Points
Efrem Winters	31	1039	182	92	205	54	21	19	456
Bruce Douglas	31	1113	159	81	136	177	5	73	399
Doug Altenberger	31	1125	143	66	15	68	4	39	352
George Montgomery	31	967	124	53	224	53	17	27	301
Quinn Richardson	31	1029	94	50	61	93	0	23	238
Scott Meents	28	465	61	23	91	33	25	9	145
Tom Schafer	29	302	28	23	43	9	1	6	79
Tony Wysinger	30	192	15	27	14	23	0	11	57
Reggie Woodward	14	43	12	4	10	5	0	3	28
Don Klusendorf	19	55	4	10	10	6	0	1	18
Anthony Welch	2	25	6	2	2	0	0	0	14
Dee Maras	6	30	3	0	11	2	0	1	6
Drag Marinkovich	4	6	2	2	0	0	0	0	6
Joe Klauke	2	2	1	0	0	0	0	0	2
Tom Siegel	3	3	1	0	1	0	0	0	2
Stephan Freeman	2	3	0	0	0	0	0	0	0

== Awards and honors ==
- Bruce Douglas
  - United Press International 3rd team All-American
  - Big Ten Player of the Year
  - Team Co-Most Valuable Player
  - Fighting Illini All-Century team (2005)
- Quinn Richardson
  - Team Co-Most Valuable Player

== Team players drafted into the NBA ==
- No one from the Fighting Illini was selected in the 1984 NBA draft.
