= 1983–84 Indiana Hoosiers men's basketball team =

American college basketball season

1983–84 Indiana Hoosiers men's basketball

NCAA men's Division I tournament, Elite Eight
- Conference: Big Ten Conference

Ranking
- Coaches: No. 18
- Record: 22–9 (13–5 Big Ten)
- Head coach: Bobby Knight (13th season)
- Captain: Dan Dakich
- Home arena: Assembly Hall

1983–84 Big Ten Conference men's basketball standings
	Conf.				Overall
Team	W		L	PCT	W		L	PCT
No. 6 Illinois	15	–	3	.833	26	–	5	.839
No. 10 Purdue	15	–	3	.833	22	–	7	.759
Indiana	13	–	5	.722	22	–	9	.710
Michigan	10	–	8	.556	24	–	9	.727
Michigan State	8	–	10	.444	15	–	13	.536
Ohio State	8	–	10	.444	15	–	14	.517
Northwestern	5	–	13	.278	14	–	14	.500
Minnesota	6	–	12	.333	15	–	13	.536
Iowa	6	–	12	.333	13	–	15	.464
Wisconsin*	0	–	18	.000	0	–	28	.000
Rankings from AP Poll; *Wisconsin forfeited all games due to NCAA sanctions. Disputed record (4–14, 8–20)

The 1983–84 Indiana Hoosiers men's basketball team represented Indiana University. Their head coach was Bobby Knight, who was in his 13th year. The team played its home games in Assembly Hall in Bloomington, Indiana, and was a member of the Big Ten Conference.

The Hoosiers finished the regular season with an overall record of 22–9 and a conference record of 13–5, finishing 3rd in the Big Ten Conference. IU was invited to participate in the 1984 NCAA Tournament as a 4-seed. On their way to the Elite Eight, IU beat 12-seed Richmond and 1-seed North Carolina. The Hoosiers eventually lost to 7-seed Virginia in the Elite Eight.

== Roster ==
No.	Name	Position	Ht.	Year	Hometown
11	Dan Dakich	G	6–5	Jr.	Merrillville, Indiana
12	Steve Alford	G	6–2	Fr.	New Castle, Indiana
21	Winston Morgan	G/F	6–5	RS Jr.	Anderson, Indiana
22	Stew Robinson	G	6–1	So.	Anderson, Indiana
23	Chuck Franz	G	6–2	Sr.	Clarksville, Indiana
24	Daryl Thomas	F/C	6–7	Fr.	Westchester, Illinois
30	Todd Meier	F/C	6–8	Fr.	Oshkosh, Wisconsin
33	Uwe Blab	C	7–2	Jr.	Munich, Germany
40	Tracy Foster	F	6–4	So.	Fort Wayne, Indiana
41	Mike Giomi	F	6–8	So.	Newark, Ohio
50	Marty Simmons	G/F	6–5	Fr.	Lawrenceville, Illinois
52	Courtney Witte	F/C	6–8	Jr.	Vincennes, Indiana

== Schedule/results ==
Date time, TV	Rank^{#}	Opponent^{#}	Result	Record	Site city, state
Regular season
11/26/1983*	No. 19	Miami (OH)	L 57–63	0–1	Assembly Hall; Bloomington, IN
11/29/1983*		Notre Dame	W 80–72	1–1	Assembly Hall; Bloomington, IN
12/3/1983*		at No. 1 Kentucky; Indiana–Kentucky rivalry	L 54–59	1–2	Rupp Arena; Lexington, KY
12/6/1983*		Tennessee Tech	W 81–66	2–2	Assembly Hall; Bloomington, IN
12/10/1983*		at UTEP	L 61–65	2–3	Special Events Center; El Paso, TX
12/16/1983*		Texas A&M; Indiana Classic	W 73–48	3–3	Assembly Hall; Bloomington, IN
12/17/1983*		Illinois State; Indiana Classic	W 54–44	4–3	Assembly Hall; Bloomington, IN
12/21/1983*		Kansas State	W 56–53	5–3	Assembly Hall; Bloomington, IN
12/29/1983*		vs. Ball State; Hoosier Classic	W 86–43	6–3	Market Square Arena; Indianapolis, IN
12/30/1983*		vs. No. 12 Boston College; Hoosier Classic	W 72–66	7–3	Market Square Arena; Indianapolis, IN
1/7/1984		at Ohio State	W 73–62	8–3 (1–0)	St. John Arena; Columbus, OH
1/11/1984		No. 9 Illinois; Rivalry	W 73–68	9–3 (2–0)	Assembly Hall; Bloomington, IN
1/14/1984		Purdue; Rivalry	L 66–74	9–4 (2–1)	Assembly Hall; Bloomington, IN
1/19/1984		at Michigan State	W 70–62	10–4 (3–1)	Jenison Fieldhouse; East Lansing, MI
1/21/1984		at Michigan	L 50–55	10–5 (3–2)	Crisler Arena; Ann Arbor, MI
1/26/1984		Northwestern	W 57–44	11–5 (4–2)	Assembly Hall; Bloomington, IN
1/28/1984		Iowa	W 54–47	12–5 (5–2)	Assembly Hall; Bloomington, IN
2/2/1984		at Minnesota	W 67–54	13–5 (6–2)	Williams Arena; Minneapolis, MN
2/4/1984		at Wisconsin	W 81–67	14–5 (7–2)	Wisconsin Field House; Madison, WI
2/9/1984		Wisconsin	W 74–64	15–5 (8–2)	Assembly Hall; Bloomington, IN
2/11/1984		Minnesota	W 74–72	16–5 (9–2)	Assembly Hall; Bloomington, IN
2/16/1984	No. 17	at Iowa	W 49–45	17–5 (10–2)	Carver-Hawkeye Arena; Iowa City, IA
2/18/1984	No. 17	at Northwestern	L 51–63	17–6 (10–3)	Welsh-Ryan Arena; Evanston, IL
2/23/1984		Michigan	W 72–57	18–6 (11–3)	Assembly Hall; Bloomington, IN
2/26/1984		Michigan State	L 54–57	18–7 (11–4)	Assembly Hall; Bloomington, IN
2/29/1984		at No. 11 Purdue; Rivalry	W 78–59	19–7 (12–4)	Mackey Arena; West Lafayette, IN
3/4/1984		at No. 10 Illinois; Rivalry	L 53–70	19–8 (12–5)	Assembly Hall; Champaign, IL
3/10/1984		Ohio State	W 53–49	20–8 (13–5)	Assembly Hall; Bloomington, IN
NCAA tournament
3/17/1984*	(4 E)	vs. (12 E) Richmond; Second Round	W 75–67	21–8	Charlotte Coliseum; Charlotte, NC
3/22/1984*	(4 E)	vs. (1 E) No. 1 North Carolina; East Regional semifinal – Sweet Sixteen	W 72–68	22–8	Omni Coliseum; Atlanta, GA
3/24/1984*	(4 E)	vs. (7 E) Virginia; East Regional Final – Elite Eight	L 48–50	22–9	Omni Coliseum; Atlanta, GA
*Non-conference game. ^{#}Rankings from AP Poll. (#) Tournament seedings in parentheses. E=East.
