= UTEP Miners men's basketball statistical leaders =

The UTEP Miners men's basketball statistical leaders are individual statistical leaders of the UTEP Miners men's basketball program in various categories, including points, assists, blocks, rebounds, and steals. Within those areas, the lists identify single-game, single-season, and career leaders. The Miners represent the University of Texas at El Paso in the NCAA Division I Mountain West Conference.

UTEP began competing in intercollegiate basketball in 1914. However, the school's record book does not generally list records from before the 1950s, as records from before this period are often incomplete and inconsistent. Since scoring was much lower in this era, and teams played much fewer games during a typical season, it is likely that few or no players from this era would appear on these lists anyway.

The NCAA did not officially record assists as a stat until the 1983–84 season, and blocks and steals until the 1985–86 season, but UTEP's record books includes players in these stats before these seasons. These lists are updated through the end of the 2020–21 season.

== Scoring ==
Career
Rk	Player	Points	Seasons
1	Stefon Jackson	2,456	2005–06 2006–07 2007–08 2008–09
2	Randy Culpepper	2,338	2007–08 2008–09 2009–10 2010–11
3	Brandon Wolfram	1,831	1997–98 1998–99 1999–00 2000–01
4	Antoine Gillespie	1,706	1992–93 1993–94 1994–95
5	Tim Hardaway	1,586	1985–86 1986–87 1987–88 1988–89
6	Julian Washburn	1,526	2011–12 2012–13 2013–14 2014–15
7	Nate Archibald	1,459	1967–68 1968–69 1969–70
8	Souley Boum	1,456	2019–20 2020–21 2021–22
9	Dave Feitl	1,442	1982–83 1983–84 1984–85 1985–86
10	Omega Harris	1,407	2014–15 2015–16 2016–17 2017–18

Season
Rk	Player	Points	Season
1	Stefon Jackson	908	2008–09
2	Jim Barnes	816	1963–64
3	Stefon Jackson	778	2007–08
4	Tim Hardaway	727	1988–89
5	Omar Thomas	716	2004–05
6	Brandon Wolfram	714	2000–01
7	Antoine Gillespie	710	1993–94
8	Randy Culpepper	674	2010–11
9	Randy Culpepper	648	2008–09
10	Antoine Gillespie	607	1994–95

Single game
Rk	Player	Points	Season	Opponent
1	Jim Barnes	51	1963–64	Western New Mexico
2	Antoine Gillespie	45	1993–94	Hawaii
	Randy Culpepper	45	2009–10	East Carolina
4	Stefon Jackson	44	2008–09	Santa Clara
5	Jim Barnes	42	1963–64	Long Beach State
	Jim Barnes	42	1963–64	Texas A&M
7	Jim Barnes	41	1963–64	Missouri State
	Stefon Jackson	41	2007–08	East Carolina
9	Jim Barnes	40	1963–64	West Texas State
10	Randy Culpepper	39	2009–10	UCF

== Rebounds ==
Career
Rk	Player	Rebounds	Seasons
1	Jim Barnes	965	1962–63 1963–64
2	Terry White	948	1978–79 1979–80 1980–81 1981–82
3	Anthony Burns	923	1977–78 1978–79 1979–80 1980–81
4	Harry Flournoy	836	1963–64 1964–65 1965–66
5	John Bohannon	825	2010–11 2011–12 2012–13 2013–14
6	John Tofi	774	2002–03 2003–04 2004–05 2005–06
7	Roy Smallwood	755	1999–00 2000–01 2001–02 2002–03 2003–04
8	Antonio Davis	744	1986–87 1987–88 1988–89 1989–90
	Julyan Stone	744	2007–08 2008–09 2009–10 2010–11
10	Brandon Wolfram	734	1997–98 1998–99 1999–00 2000–01

Season
Rk	Player	Rebounds	Season
1	Jim Barnes	537	1963–64
2	Jim Barnes	428	1962–63
3	Harry Flournoy	309	1965–66
4	Harry Flournoy	306	1964–65
5	Vince Hunter	305	2014–15
6	Arnett Moultrie	302	2008–09
7	Jim Forbes	290	1971–72
8	Terry White	288	1981–82
9	Ed Haller	277	1955–56
	Al Tolen	277	1960–61

Single game
Rk	Player	Rebounds	Season	Opponent
1	Jim Barnes	36	1963–64	Western New Mexico
2	Jim Barnes	28	1963–64	Missouri State
3	Jim Barnes	27	1962–63	Hardin-Simmons
	Jim Barnes	27	1963–64	Centenary
5	Jim Barnes	26	1963–64	Tennessee Tech
	Jim Barnes	26	1963–64	West Texas A&M
7	Jim Barnes	25	1963–64	Long Beach State
8	Al Tolen	24	1960–61	Arizona State
	Al Tolen	24	1960–61	West Texas A&M
	Jim Barnes	24	1962–63	Wisconsin
	Jim Barnes	24	1962–63	Los Angeles State
	Jim Barnes	24	1963–64	Tarleton State
	Terry White	24	1981–82	Texas Southern

== Assists ==
Career
Rk	Player	Assists	Seasons
1	Julyan Stone	714	2007–08 2008–09 2009–10 2010–11
2	Tim Hardaway	563	1985–86 1986–87 1987–88 1988–89
3	Prince Stewart	481	1987–88 1988–89 1989–90 1991–92
4	Filiberto Rivera	381	2003–04 2004–05
5	Dominic Artis	357	2015–16 2016–17
6	Eddie Rivera	323	1991–92 1992–93
7	Jason Williams	321	2003–04 2004–05 2005–06
8	Jeep Jackson	313	1983–84 1984–85 1985–86 1986–87
9	Jacques Streeter	311	2011–12 2012–13
10	Kent Lockhart	279	1981–82 1982–83 1983–84 1984–85

Season
Rk	Player	Assists	Season
1	Julyan Stone	236	2008–09
2	Filiberto Rivera	229	2004–05
3	Dominic Artis	187	2016–17
4	Julyan Stone	184	2010–11
5	Tim Hardaway	183	1987–88
6	Prince Stewart	180	1989–90
	Julyan Stone	180	2009–10
8	Tim Hardaway	179	1988–89
9	Eddie Rivera	178	1992–93
10	Jacques Streeter	171	2012–13

Single game
Rk	Player	Assists	Season	Opponent
1	Filiberto Rivera	18	2004–05	Louisiana Tech
2	Joe Griffin	14	1989–90	Sam Houston State
3	Eddie Rivera	13	1992–93	Mississippi College
	Dominic Artis	13	2016–17	Louisiana College
5	Tim Hardaway	12	1988–89	San Diego State
	Joe Griffin	12	1989–90	Austin Peay State
	Filiberto Rivera	12	2004–05	Alabama State
	Filiberto Rivera	12	2004–05	Fresno State
	Julyan Stone	12	2009–10	New Mexico State
	Jacques Streeter	12	2012–13	Houston
	Dominic Artis	12	2016–17	New Mexico
	Dominic Artis	12	2016–17	Northern Arizona

== Steals ==
Career
Rk	Player	Steals	Seasons
1	Tim Hardaway	262	1985–86 1986–87 1987–88 1988–89
2	Randy Culpepper	251	2007–08 2008–09 2009–10 2010–11
3	Julyan Stone	209	2007–08 2008–09 2009–10 2010–11
4	Otis Frazier	177	2022–23 2023–24 2024–25
5	Jeep Jackson	165	1983–84 1984–85 1985–86 1986–87
6	Prince Stewart	154	1987–88 1988–89 1989–90 1991–92
	Johnny Melvin	154	1988–89 1990–91 1991–92 1992–93
8	Stefon Jackson	140	2005–06 2006–07 2007–08 2008–09
9	Jason Williams	135	2003–04 2004–05 2005–06
10	Roy Smallwood	132	1999–00 2000–01 2001–02 2002–03 2003–04

Season
Rk	Player	Steals	Season
1	Tim Hardaway	93	1988–89
2	Tim Hardaway	77	1987–88
3	Otis Frazier	75	2023–24
	Otis Frazier	75	2024–25
5	Randy Culpepper	71	2010–11
6	Tim Hardaway	68	1986–87
7	Randy Culpepper	67	2008–09
8	Calvin Solomon	64	2022–23
9	Jeep Jackson	63	1986–87
10	Shamar Givance	62	2022–23

Single game
Rk	Player	Steals	Season	Opponent
1	Edgar Moreno	8	2005–06	UT-Permian Basin
	Otis Frazier	8	2023–24	Middle Tennessee
	Otis Frazier	8	2024–25	Kennesaw State
4	Tim Hardaway	7	1986–87	Colorado State
	Tim Hardaway	7	1987–88	New Mexico State
	Tim Hardaway	7	1988–89	Fort Lewis
	Tim Hardaway	7	1988–89	South Carolina State
	Gym Bice	7	1990–91	Hawaii
	Sharif Fajardo	7	1998–99	Hawaii
	Filiberto Rivera	7	2004–05	San Jose State
	Kevin Henderson	7	2005–06	Pacific
	Shamar Givance	7	2022–23	UAB
	Otis Frazier	7	2023–24	Jacksonville State
	Otis Frazier	7	2024–25	Northern New Mexico

== Blocks ==
Career
Rk	Player	Blocks	Seasons
1	David Van Dyke	336	1988–89 1989–90 1990–91 1991–92
2	John Bohannon	163	2010–11 2011–12 2012–13 2013–14
3	Dave Feitl	137	1982–83 1983–84 1984–85 1985–86
4	Matt Willms	125	2013–14 2014–15 2015–16 2016–17 2017–18
5	George Banks	122	1993–94 1994–95
6	Roy Smallwood	119	1999–00 2000–01 2001–02 2002–03 2003–04
7	John Tofi	110	2002–03 2003–04 2004–05 2005–06
8	Ralph Davis	107	1990–91 1991–92 1992–93 1993–94
9	Antonio Davis	104	1986–87 1987–88 1988–89 1989–90
10	Brian Stewart	87	2000–01 2001–02

Season
Rk	Player	Blocks	Season
1	David Van Dyke	116	1991–92
2	David Van Dyke	90	1988–89
3	David Van Dyke	82	1990–91
4	George Banks	65	1994–95
5	George Banks	57	1993–94
6	John Bohannon	53	2013–14
7	Dave Feitl	51	1984–85
8	John Bohannon	50	2012–13
9	Brian Stewart	48	2000–01
	David Van Dyke	48	1989–90

Single game
Rk	Player	Blocks	Season	Opponent
1	Wayne Campbell	8	1987–88	Northern Illinois
	David Van Dyke	8	1991–92	San Diego State
	Brian Stewart	8	2000–01	Florida A&M
4	David Van Dyke	7	1988–89	Fort Lewis
	David Van Dyke	7	1988–89	Alcorn State
	David Van Dyke	7	1991–92	Southern Utah
	David Van Dyke	7	1991–92	Colorado State
	John Bohannon	7	2013–14	Middle Tennessee
9	David Van Dyke	6	1988–89	Cleveland State
	David Van Dyke	6	1989–90	South Carolina
	David Van Dyke	6	1990–91	New Mexico State
	David Van Dyke	6	1990–91	Colorado State
	David Van Dyke	6	1991–92	Houston Baptist
	David Van Dyke	6	1991–92	Texas Wesleyan
	David Van Dyke	6	1991–92	Utah
	George Banks	6	1994–95	Wyoming
	George Banks	6	1994–95	Colorado State
	George Banks	6	1994–95	BYU
	George Banks	6	1994–95	Utah
	Brian Stewart	6	2001–02	New Mexico State
	Hooper Vint	6	2015–16	UAB
