= Nevada Wolf Pack men's basketball statistical leaders =

The Nevada Wolf Pack men's basketball statistical leaders are individual statistical leaders of the Nevada Wolf Pack men's basketball program in various categories, including points, three-pointers, assists, blocks, rebounds, and steals. Within those areas, the lists identify single-game, single-season, and career leaders. The Wolf Pack represent the University of Nevada, Reno in the NCAA's Mountain West Conference.

Nevada began competing in intercollegiate basketball in 1912. However, the school's record book does not generally list records from before the 1950s, as records from before this period are often incomplete and inconsistent. Since scoring was much lower in this era, and teams played much fewer games during a typical season, it is likely that few or no players from this era would appear on these lists anyway.

The NCAA did not officially record assists as a stat until the 1983–84 season, and blocks and steals until the 1985–86 season, but Nevada's record books includes players in these stats before these seasons. These lists are updated through the end of the 2021–22 season.

== Scoring ==
Career
Rk	Player	Points	Seasons
1	Nick Fazekas	2,464	2003–04 2004–05 2005–06 2006–07
2	Deonte Burton	2,102	2010–11 2011–12 2012–13 2013–14
3	Marcelus Kemp	1,939	2003–04 2005–06 2006–07 2007–08
4	Edgar Jones	1,877	1975–76 1976–77 1977–78 1978–79
5	Jordan Caroline	1,742	2016–17 2017–18 2018–19
6	Alex Boyd	1,731	1967–68 1968–69 1969–70
7	Terrance Green	1,646	1999–00 2000–01 2001–02 2002–03
8	Pete Padgett	1,642	1972–73 1973–74 1974–75 1975–76
9	Ric Herrin	1,512	1989–90 1990–91 1991–92 1992–93
10	Darryl Owens	1,504	1986–87 1987–88 1988–89

Season
Rk	Player	Points	Season
1	Luke Babbitt	743	2009–10
2	Nick Fazekas	721	2005–06
3	Ken Green	697	1982–83
4	Marcus Marshall	689	2016–17
5	Caleb Martin	680	2017–18
6	Alex Boyd	688	1967–68
7	Nick Fazekas	662	2004–05
8	Marcelus Kemp	659	2007–08
9	Jordan Caroline	656	2017–18
10	Nick Fazekas	652	2006–07

Single game
Rk	Player	Points	Season	Opponent
1	Alex Boyd	49	1967–68	Willamette
2	Kevin Franklin	48	1989–90	LMU
3	Jordan Caroline	45	2016–17	UNM
4	Gabriel Parizzia	43	1988–89	NAU
5	Kevin Franklin	40	1989–90	EWU

== Rebounds ==
Career
Rk	Player	Rebounds	Seasons
1	Pete Padgett	1,464	1972–73 1973–74 1974–75 1975–76
2	Nick Fazekas	1,254	2003–04 2004–05 2005–06 2006–07
3	Edgar Jones	1,120	1975–76 1976–77 1977–78 1978–79
4	Dario Hunt	1,032	2008–09 2009–10 2010–11 2011–12
5	Jordan Caroline	958	2016–17 2017–18 2018–19
6	Alex Boyd	924	1967–68 1968–69 1969–70
7	Nap Montgomery	890	1963–64 1964–65 1965–66
8	Ric Herrin	815	1989–90 1990–91 1991–92 1992–93
9	Lindsey Drew	654	2015–16 2016–17 2017–18 2019–20
10	Matt Williams	653	1987–88 1988–89 1989–90 1990–91

Season
Rk	Player	Rebounds	Season
1	Pete Padgett	462	1972–73
2	Pete Padgett	395	1973–74
3	Alex Boyd	364	1967–68
4	Edgar Jones	355	1976–77
5	Nick Fazekas	354	2006–07
6	Cameron Oliver	345	2015–16
7	Nick Fazekas	342	2005–06
8	Dario Hunt	338	2011–12
9	Alex Boyd	333	1968–69
10	AJ West	331	2014–15

Single game
Rk	Player	Rebounds	Season	Opponent
1	Pete Padgett	30	1972–73	LMU
2	Edgar Jones	26	1977–78	Doane
3	Dave Webber	25	1972–73	St. Mary's
	Pete Padgett	25	1972–73	St. Mary's
	Dave Webber	25	1973–74	Portland

== Assists ==
Career
Rk	Player	Assists	Seasons
1	Kevin Soares	716	1988–89 1989–90 1990–91 1991–92
2	Deonte Burton	515	2010–11 2011–12 2012–13 2013–14
3	Lindsey Drew	508	2015–16 2016–17 2017–18 2019–20
4	Ramon Sessions	478	2004–05 2005–06 2006–07
5	Billy Allen	468	1981–82 1982–83
6	Armon Johnson	445	2007–08 2008–09 2009–10
7	Eathan O’Bryant	438	1993–94 1994–95
8	Darryl Owens	437	1986–87 1987–88 1988–89
9	Kenan Blackshear	395	2021–22 2022–23 2023–24
10	Pete Padgett	389	1972–73 1973–74 1974–75 1975–76

Season
Rk	Player	Assists	Season
1	Billy Allen	240	1981–82
2	Billy Allen	228	1982–83
3	Kevin Soares	227	1991–92
	Eathan O’Bryant	227	1993–94
5	Eathan O’Bryant	210	1994–95
6	Curtis High	189	1983–84
	Armon Johnson	189	2009–10
8	James Fontenet	188	1980–81
9	Kevin Soares	181	1990–91
10	Grant Sherfield	179	2021–22

Single game
Rk	Player	Assists	Season	Opponent
1	Billy Allen	16	1981–82	South Dakota St.
	Billy Allen	16	1982–83	Detroit
	Eathan O’Bryant	16	1994–95	UC Irvine
4	Mike Mardian	14	1975–76	CSU Hayward
	Billy Allen	14	1982–83	KWC
	Curtis High	14	1983–84	San Diego
	Eathan O’Bryant	14	1993–94	CSU Stan.
	Eathan O’Bryant	14	1994–95	UNLV
	Eathan O’Bryant	14	1994–95	UC Irvine
	Grant Sherfield	14	2020–21	Boise State

== Steals ==
Career
Rk	Player	Steals	Seasons
1	Kevin Soares	255	1988–89 1989–90 1990–91 1991–92
2	Johnny High	205	1977–78 1978–79
3	Darryl Owens	196	1986–87 1987–88 1988–89
4	Deonte Burton	169	2010–11 2011–12 2012–13 2013–14
5	Lindsey Drew	168	2015–16 2016–17 2017–18 2019–20
6	Matt Williams	162	1987–88 1988–89 1989–90 1990–91
7	Tre Coleman	158	2020–21 2021–22 2022–23 2023–24 2024–25
8	Curtis High	154	1983–84 1984–85
9	Eathan O’Bryant	140	1993–94 1994–95
10	Kenan Blackshear	134	2021–22 2022–23 2023–24

Season
Rk	Player	Steals	Season
1	Johnny High	115	1978–79
2	Johnny High	90	1977–78
	Kevin Soares	90	1991–92
4	Curtis High	84	1983–84
5	Gene Ransom	80	1979–80
6	Kevin Soares	76	1990–91
7	Eathan O’Bryant	74	1993–94
8	Darryl Owens	73	1987–88
9	Curtis High	70	1984–85
10	Paul Culbertson	68	1997–98

Single game
Rk	Player	Steals	Season	Opponent
1	Curtis High	9	1983–84	Pepperdine
2	Johnny High	8	1978–79	Chico State
	Johnny High	8	1978–79	SOU
	Gene Ransom	8	1979–80	NAU

== Blocks ==
Career
Rk	Player	Blocks	Seasons
1	Dario Hunt	275	2008–09 2009–10 2010–11 2011–12
2	Nick Fazekas	192	2003–04 2004–05 2005–06 2006–07
3	Cameron Oliver	190	2015–16 2016–17
4	Edgar Jones	180	1975–76 1976–77 1977–78 1978–79
5	AJ West	145	2013–14 2014–15 2015–16
6	Matt Williams	135	1987–88 1988–89 1989–90 1990–91
7	JaVale McGee	116	2006–07 2007–08
8	Sean Paul	107	2000–01 2001–02 2002–03 2003–04
9	Lindsey Drew	106	2015–16 2016–17 2017–18 2019–20
10	Greg Palm	103	1980–81 1981–82

Season
Rk	Player	Blocks	Season
1	Cameron Oliver	99	2015–16
2	Edgar Jones	96	1977–78
3	JaVale McGee	92	2007–08
4	Cameron Oliver	91	2016–17
5	Dario Hunt	83	2011–12
6	AJ West	79	2014–15
7	Dario Hunt	67	2008–09
8	Dario Hunt	66	2009–10
9	Elijah Price	62	2025–26
10	Dario Hunt	59	2010–11

Single game
Rk	Player	Blocks	Season	Opponent
1	Edgar Jones	10	1977–78	Doane
2	Van Beard	8	1985–86	Santa Clara
	AJ West	8	2013–14	Fresno State
	AJ West	8	2014–15	Fresno State
5	Edgar Jones	7	1976–77	Houston
	Edgar Jones	7	1978–79	UC Davis
	Edgar Jones	7	1978–79	Portland
