= Trent Johnson =

American basketball coach (born 1956)

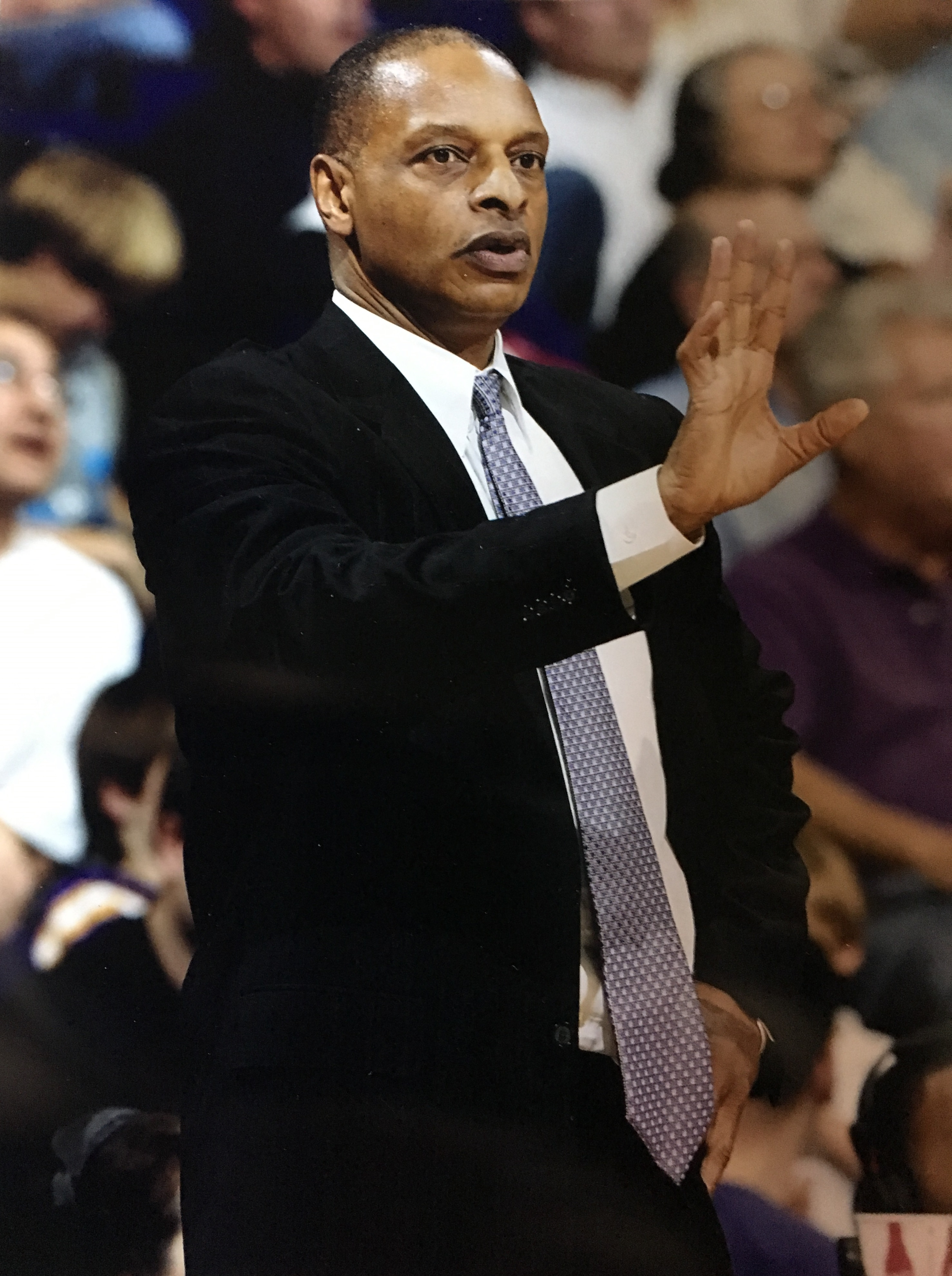

Biographical details
- Born: September 12, 1956 (age 70); Berkeley, California, U.S.

Playing career
- 1974–1978: Boise State

Coaching career (HC unless noted)
- 1980–1985: Boise HS (ID)
- 1986–1989: Utah (assistant)
- 1989–1992: Washington (assistant)
- 1992–1996: Rice (assistant)
- 1996–1999: Stanford (assistant)
- 1999–2004: Nevada
- 2004–2008: Stanford
- 2008–2012: LSU
- 2012–2016: TCU
- 2017–2018: Louisville (assistant)
- 2019–2021: California (assistant)
- 2021–2023: Cal State Northridge

Head coaching record
- Overall: 290–313 (.481) (college)
- Tournaments: 5–5 (NCAA Division I); 1–3 (NIT)

Accomplishments and honors

Championships
- WAC tournament (2004); WAC regular season (2004); SEC regular season (2009)

Awards
- Pac-10 Coach of the Year (2008); SEC Coach of the Year (2009)

Trent Aubrey Johnson (born September 12, 1956) is an American former college basketball coach. Johnson had previously been the head coach at Cal State University Northridge, Texas Christian University, Louisiana State University, Stanford University, and University of Nevada.

== Early life and education ==
Johnson was born in Berkeley, California. He graduated from Franklin High School in Seattle, Washington in 1974 and played at Boise State University from 1974 to 1978. He received his bachelor's degree in physical education from Boise State in 1983.

== Coaching career ==
=== Nevada ===
The University of Nevada, Reno hired Johnson as head coach for Nevada Wolf Pack men's basketball on March 7, 1999. This culminated in the 2003–04 season, when Johnson guided the Wolf Pack to a 25–9 record and its first NCAA tournament appearance since 1985. Led by stars Kirk Snyder, Marcelus Kemp, and Nick Fazekas, Nevada defeated Michigan State and Gonzaga in the opening rounds of the tournament, before falling to eventual tournament runner-up Georgia Tech in the Sweet 16.

=== Stanford ===
Stanford University hired Johnson as head coach of Cardinal men's basketball on May 25, 2004. In his four seasons at Stanford, Trent Johnson had a record of 80–48 (.625). He led the Cardinal to three appearances in the NCAA tournament and one NIT appearance. Johnson's 2007–08 team advanced to the Sweet 16 as a No. 3 seed before finishing with a 28–8 overall record. He was named Pac-10 Coach of the Year following the regular season. Johnson's teams also reached NCAA Tournament in 2005 and 2007.

=== LSU ===
On April 10, 2008, Johnson left Stanford and was named the 20th head coach of LSU Tigers men's basketball. Johnson would go on to win the SEC Coach of the Year award during his first season after compiling a 13–3 regular season record and outright SEC regular season title. His 26–7 overall record, along with the SEC title, would be enough to earn his team its first NCAA tournament berth since 2006. The next two years resulted in poor finishes with 11–20 records both seasons. The 2011–12 season was better as LSU finished 18–14 and received an NIT bid.

=== TCU ===
Johnson resigned as head coach at LSU to be named head coach at Texas Christian University (TCU) on April 9, 2012, heading into TCU's inaugural season in the Big 12 Conference after moving from the Mountain West Conference.

In four seasons, Johnson went 50–79 at TCU, and his teams never finished higher than ninth in the Big 12. TCU went winless in Big 12 play in the 2013–14 season. However, Johnson's tenure at TCU included some upsets of top-25 teams, including a 62–55 home upset of #5 Kansas on February 6, 2013. In the 2014–15 season, TCU began the season 13–0 and made the 25th spot on the AP Poll for the week of December 22, for the program's first top-25 ranking in 16 years. TCU finished 18–15 that season after going 4–14 in Big 12 play. This would be Johnson's only winning season at TCU.

On March 13, 2016, TCU fired Johnson.

=== Louisville ===
On October 11, 2017, the University of Louisville hired Johnson to fill the assistant coach opening created by new Louisville head coach David Padgett's promotion.

Trent Johnson signed a nine-month contract to join David Padgett's interim staff. Louisville will pay Johnson $300,000 in salary in a deal that runs through June 30, the customary last day of men's basketball contracts at Louisville.

Johnson was not retained as assistant coach by new head coach Chris Mack following the season.

=== California ===
Johnson served as the Deputy Analyst and Director of Player Development at Cal from 2019 to 2021.

=== Cal State Northridge ===
Following Mark Gottfried and his staff being placed on leave, Johnson was named the interim head coach of the Matadors. After the season, Cal State Northridge removed the "interim" tag and officially named Johnson the seventh head coach in school history. On March 30, 2023, Johnson announced his resignation as head coach of the program.

== Head coaching record ==
Record table
Season	Team	Overall	Conference	Standing	Postseason
Nevada Wolf Pack (Big West Conference) (1999–2000)
1999–00	Nevada	9–20	6–10	T–3rd (East)	
Nevada Wolf Pack (Western Athletic Conference) (2000–2004)
2000–01	Nevada	10–18	3–13	9th	
2001–02	Nevada	17–13	9–9	T–5th	
2002–03	Nevada	18–14	10–6	T–3rd	NIT first round
2003–04	Nevada	25–9	13–5	T–1st	NCAA Division I Sweet 16
Nevada:		79–74 (.516)	41–43 (.488)		
Stanford Cardinal (Pacific-10 Conference) (2004–2008)
2004–05	Stanford	18–13	11–7	T–3rd	NCAA Division I First Round
2005–06	Stanford	16–14	11–7	T–4th	NIT second round
2006–07	Stanford	18–13	10–8	6th	NCAA Division I First Round
2007–08	Stanford	28–8	13–5	2nd	NCAA Division I Sweet 16
Stanford:		80–48 (.625)	45–27 (.625)		
LSU Tigers (Southeastern Conference) (2008–2012)
2008–09	LSU	27–8	13–3	1st	NCAA Division I Second Round
2009–10	LSU	11–20	2–14	6th (West)	
2010–11	LSU	11–20	3–13	6th (West)	
2011–12	LSU	18–14	7–9	8th	NIT first round
LSU:		67–62 (.519)	25–39 (.391)		
TCU Horned Frogs (Big 12 Conference) (2012–2016)
2012–13	TCU	11–21	2–16	10th	
2013–14	TCU	9–22	0–18	10th	
2014–15	TCU	18–15	4–14	9th	
2015–16	TCU	12–21	2–16	10th	
TCU:		50–79 (.388)	8–64 (.111)		
Cal State Northridge Matadors (Big West Conference) (2021–2023)
2021–22	Cal State Northridge	7–23	3–13	8th	
2022–23	Cal State Northridge	7–25	4–16	10th	
Cal State Northridge:		14–48 (.226)	7–29 (.194)		
Total:		290–313 (.481)			
National champion Postseason invitational champion Conference regular season champion Conference regular season and conference tournament champion Division regular season champion Division regular season and conference tournament champion Conference tournament champion
