= Mario Kasun =

Croatian basketball player (born 1980)

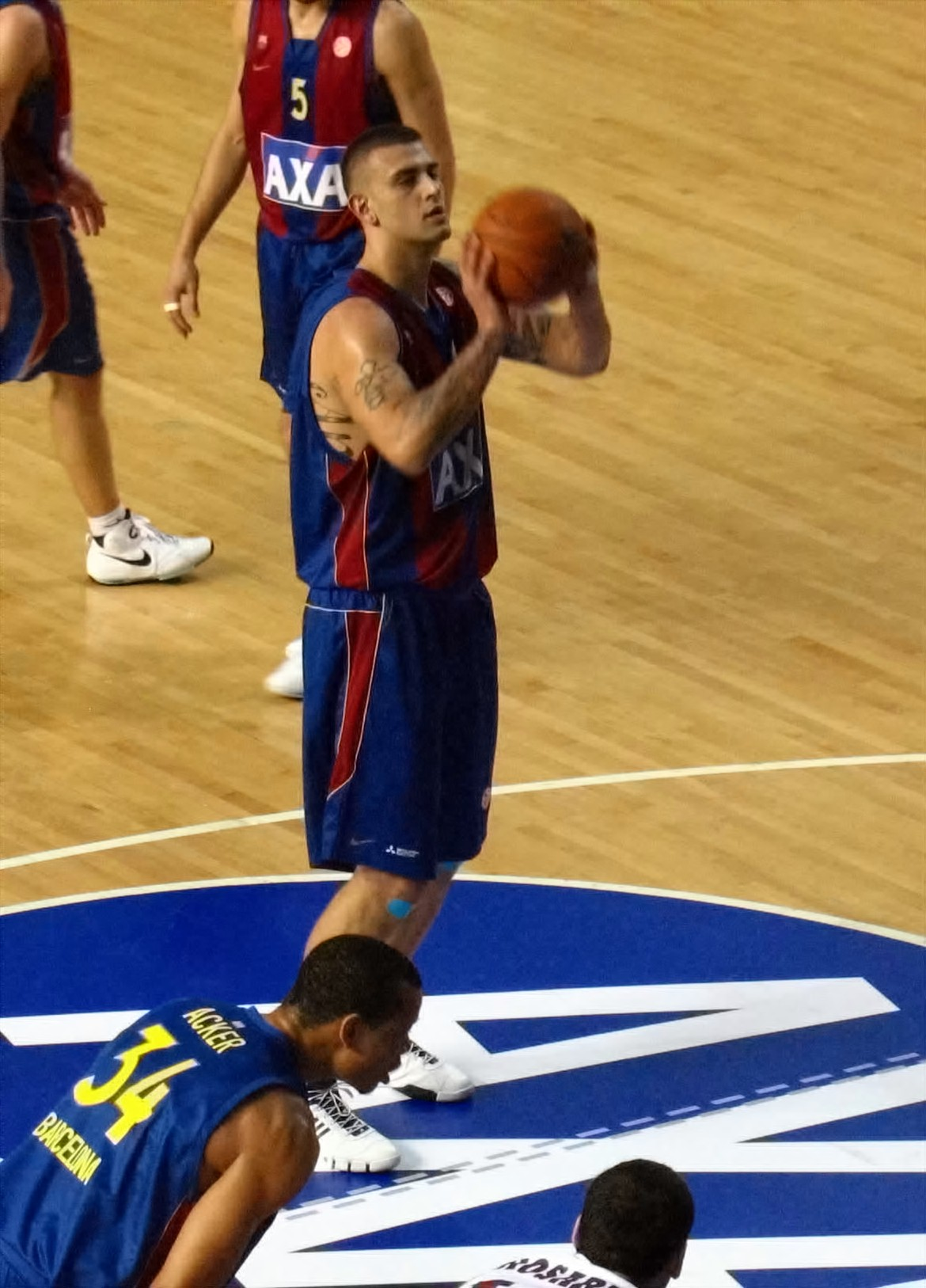
- Kasun with FC Barcelona in 2008

Personal information
- Born: April 5, 1980 (age 46) Vinkovci, SR Croatia, SFR Yugoslavia
- Listed height: 7 ft 1 in (2.16 m)
- Listed weight: 260 lb (118 kg)

Career information
- NBA draft: 2002: 2nd round, 41st overall pick
- Drafted by: Los Angeles Clippers
- Playing career: 1996–2014
- Position: Center
- Number: 41

Career history
- 1996–1997: KK Gorica
- 1997–2000: KK Zrinjevac
- 2002: RheinEnergie Köln
- 2002–2004: Frankfurt Opel Skyliners
- 2004–2006: Orlando Magic
- 2006–2008: FC Barcelona
- 2008–2010: Efes Pilsen
- 2010–2012: Zagreb
- 2012: Montepaschi Siena
- 2013–2014: Al Wasl Dubai

Career highlights
- Bundesliga champion (2004); Turkish League champion (2009); Copa del Rey winner (2007); Turkish Cup winner (2009); Krešimir Ćosić Cup winner (2011); Krešimir Ćosić Cup MVP (2011); Croatian All-Star (2012); Bundesliga All-Star (2004)
- Stats at NBA.com
- Stats at Basketball Reference

Mario Kasun (born April 5, 1980) is a Croatian former professional basketball player. He played at the center position.

== Professional career ==
Kasun started playing basketball at a local club in Delnice when he was 14, before he started playing professionally with BC Zrinjevac in Zagreb. He was part of the 1998–99 Croatian junior team and the Croatian under-21 team in 2000.

After two seasons in the Zagreb club, and winning the Croatian Cup, in 2000 he moved to Gonzaga University in the NCAA, but was subsequently suspended by the Croatian Basketball Federation for this abrupt move, and spent two seasons on the bench.

Kasun played at 2002 NBA pre-draft camp in Chicago, being one of the tallest players, and showing some center skills. During 50 minutes over three games, he totalled 20 points and had 14 rebounds and six blocked shots, converting nine of 17 shots (52.9%). In 2002, he was initially selected by the National Basketball Association's (NBA) Los Angeles Clippers in the second round (41st overall) of the 2002 NBA draft. On June 26, he was traded by the Clippers to the Orlando Magic in exchange for future considerations. Regardless of this, he then moved to Germany to play for the Deutsche Bank Skyliners, based in Frankfurt. With them he won the German championship and also appeared in the 2003–04 ULEB Cup.

=== Orlando Magic ===
In 2004, he returned to the US to play for the Orlando Magic. In the 2004–05 season he played in 45 games for Orlando and averaged 7.9 minutes per game. In 2005–06, he appeared in 28 games. Kasun's final NBA game was played on March 4, 2006, in a 94–110 loss to the Denver Nuggets where he recorded 4 points in 4 minutes of playing time. Kasun averaged 2.7 points and 2.6 rebounds in a total of 73 games in his NBA career.

=== FC Barcelona ===
In July 2006 he returned to Europe again, signing a three-year contract with FC Barcelona led by head coach Duško Ivanović and general manager Zoran Savić.

On 19 January 2008, during a Spanish League game away at Gran Canaria, Kasun left the floor in a near-collapsed state while complaining of chest pain and laboured breathing. He was immediately admitted to the Perpetuo Socorro Private Hospital in Las Palmas de Gran Canaria where he underwent a series of tests and was diagnosed with cardiac arrhythmia. The following day, he was discharged and cleared to travel back to Barcelona, where he was again admitted to a hospital for more tests. Within days, he was scheduled for a surgery. Following a 9-hour surgery and several weeks of recovery, Kasun resumed his professional basketball pursuits.

=== Efes Pilsen ===
During the summer 2008 off-season, Kasun signed with Efes Pilsen.

In August 2010 he returned to Croatia and signed a one-year contract with KK Zagreb.

In August 2012 he signed a two-year contract with Montepaschi Siena. In December 2012, Kasun left the team for personal reasons. In September 2013, he signed with Al Wasl Dubai for the 2013–14 season.

In 2014 he had to play for Levski Sofia another two seasons before retiring, but the club president was arrested for tax evasions just as he was due to sign for the club, so he never played for them.

In February 2018 he played one match for KK Samobor, a regional division club from Croatia.

== Euroleague career statistics ==
Legend
GP	Games played	GS	Games started	MPG	Minutes per game
FG%	Field-goal percentage	3P%	3-point field-goal percentage	FT%	Free-throw percentage
RPG	Rebounds per game	APG	Assists per game	SPG	Steals per game
BPG	Blocks per game	PPG	Points per game	PIR	Performance index rating
**Bold**	Career high

Year	Team	GP	GS	MPG	FG%	3P%	FT%	RPG	APG	SPG	BPG	PPG	PIR
2006–07	FC Barcelona	8	7	15.9	.569	.000	**.875**	4.3	.5	.4	.5	11.9	12.1
2007–08	FC Barcelona	**21**	**12**	17.6	.620	.000	.661	3.9	.7	.4	.6	9.6	9.8
2008–09	Efes Pilsen	1	0	10.3	.600	.000	.667	1.0	.0	.0	.0	8.0	5.0
2009–10	Efes Pilsen	16	**12**	15.8	**.655**	.000	.643	5.8	.5	.4	.5	8.0	10.3
2011–12	KK Zagreb	9	9	**25.1**	.536	.000	.800	**6.6**	**.9**	**.7**	**.9**	**12.2**	**13.3**
2012–13	Montepaschi	8	4	10.9	.500	.000	.556	4.0	.3	.4	.6	5.0	5.6
Career		63	44	17.0	.592	.000	.700	4.7	.6	.4	.6	9.2	10.1

== Croatian national team ==
Kasun was part of the Croatia national basketball team at EuroBasket 2005, EuroBasket 2007 and EuroBasket 2009. After a disappointing result for Croatia in the Eurobasket 2009, Mario Kasun announced his retirement from the national team with this words: "This was my last game for the national team. Every time I gave everything on the court, but it seems that is not enough. I need the summer to rest and not be injured. Obviously I am not stable in the head anymore."

== Personal life ==
In a March 2005 interview with Inside Hoops, Kasun referred to Dražen Petrović as one of his favorite players and number one idol.

In 2007, while playing professionally for FC Barcelona, Kasun began dating the Spanish photographer Raquel Expósito, having reportedly met her at a Barcelona nightclub. The couple was engaged during summer 2008 and in early 2012 had a daughter, named Sade after the famous singer. In 2017, after more than a decade together, the two split up.

Kasun is famous for his tattoos, of which he has 30, having gotten his first when he was only 15. His tattoos are mostly related with his faith and family. On his right forearm and wrist he has an angel and four letters: E, D, M and A. Those represent the first letter on the name of every member in his family: E for his sister "Eva", D for his father, "Drago" (angels, inner side of right biceps), M is meant for his own name, "Mario" and A for mother "Ankica" (right rib). On his back he has a big tattoo of another angel, which he describes as "watching my back".
