= 1988–89 Colorado State Rams men's basketball team =

American college basketball season

1988–89 Colorado State Rams men's basketball
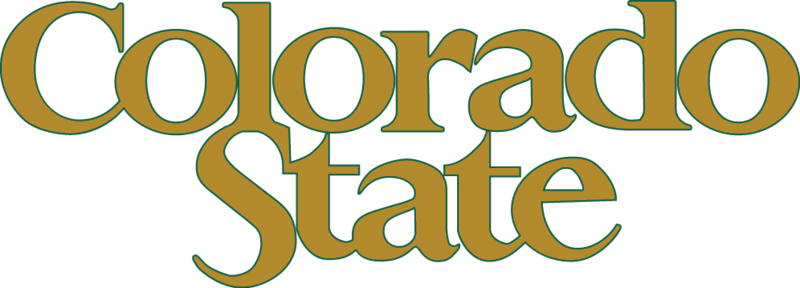

WAC Regular Season champions

NCAA tournament, second round
- Conference: Western Athletic Conference
- Record: 23–10 (12–4 WAC)
- Head coach: Boyd Grant (2nd season)
- Home arena: Moby Arena

1988–89 WAC men's basketball standings
	Conf.				Overall
Team	W		L	PCT	W		L	PCT
Colorado State	12	–	4	.750	23	–	10	.697
UTEP †	11	–	5	.688	26	–	7	.788
New Mexico	11	–	5	.688	22	–	11	.667
Hawaii	9	–	7	.563	17	–	13	.567
BYU	7	–	9	.438	14	–	15	.483
Air Force	6	–	10	.375	14	–	14	.500
Wyoming	6	–	10	.375	14	–	17	.452
Utah	6	–	10	.375	16	–	17	.485
San Diego State	4	–	12	.250	12	–	17	.414
† 1989 WAC tournament winner Rankings from AP Poll

The 1988–89 Colorado State Rams men's basketball team represented Colorado State University as a member of the Western Athletic Conference during the 1988–89 college basketball season. The team was led by head coach Boyd Grant. The Rams finished 23–10 and won the WAC regular season title with a 12–4 conference record. After falling to UTEP in the finals of the WAC tournament, the team received an at-large bid to the NCAA tournament as the No. 10 seed in the Midwest region. After defeating Florida in the opening round, the Rams were beaten by No. 2 seed Syracuse in the second round.

== Roster ==
1988–89 Colorado State Rams men's basketball team
Players
Coaches

Pos.	#	Name	Height	Weight	Year	Hometown
SF	20	Pat Durham	6 ft 7 in (2.01 m)	210 lb (95 kg)	Sr	Dallas, Texas
F/C		Mike Mitchell (redshirt)	6 ft 8 in (2.03 m)	225 lb (102 kg)	Sr	Los Angeles, California

Head coach

- Boyd Grant (Colorado State)

Assistant coach(es)

Legend

- (C) Team captain
- (S) Suspended
- (I) Ineligible
- (W) Walk-on
- Injured
- Current redshirt

== Schedule and results ==
Date time, TV	Rank^{#}	Opponent^{#}	Result	Record	Site city, state
Regular season
Nov 26, 1988*		Northern Colorado	W 70–50	1–0	Moby Arena; Fort Collins, Colorado
Nov 30, 1988*		Colorado	W 73–72	2–0	Moby Arena; Fort Collins, Colorado
Dec 2, 1988*		vs. Pacific; Apple Invitational	W 74–66	3–0	Maples Pavilion; Stanford, California
Dec 3, 1988*		at Stanford; Apple Invitational	L 49–63	3–1	Maples Pavilion; Stanford, California
Dec 6, 1988*		at North Texas	L 50–52	3–2	Super Pit; Denton, Texas
Dec 10, 1988*		Idaho State	W 71–50	4–2	Moby Arena; Fort Collins, Colorado
Dec 17, 1988*		Oral Roberts	W 102–89	5–2	Moby Arena; Fort Collins, Colorado
Dec 20, 1988*		at Baylor	W 62–53	6–2	Ferrell Center; Waco, Texas
Dec 27, 1988*		at Wisconsin-Green Bay	L 43–58	6–3	Brown County Arena; Green Bay, Wisconsin
Dec 29, 1988*		Texas Tech	L 61–71	6–4	Moby Arena; Fort Collins, Colorado
Dec 30, 1988*		Montana	W 68–66	7–4	Moby Arena; Fort Collins, Colorado
Jan 5, 1989		at San Diego State	L 57–62	7–5 (0–1)	Peterson Gym; San Diego, California
Jan 7, 1989		at Hawaii	W 62–55	7–5 (1–1)	Neal S. Blaisdell Center; Honolulu, Hawaii
Jan 12, 1989		New Mexico	W 64–62	9–5 (2–1)	Moby Arena; Fort Collins, Colorado
Jan 16, 1989		at Air Force	W 69–59	10–5 (3–1)	Clune Arena; Colorado Springs, Colorado
Jan 19, 1989		Utah	W 63–49	11–5 (4–1)	Moby Arena; Fort Collins, Colorado
Jan 21, 1989		BYU	L 69–84	11–6 (4–2)	Moby Arena; Fort Collins, Colorado
Jan 24, 1989		at UTEP	L 53–69	11–7 (4–3)	Special Events Center; El Paso, Texas
Jan 26, 1989		at New Mexico	L 62–65	11–8 (4–4)	The Pit; Albuquerque, New Mexico
Feb 2, 1989		San Diego State	W 67–47	12–8 (5–4)	Moby Arena; Fort Collins, Colorado
Feb 4, 1989		Wyoming	W 55–48	13–8 (6–4)	Moby Arena; Fort Collins, Colorado
Feb 11, 1989*		at Oral Roberts	W 76–70	14–8	Mabee Center; Tulsa, Oklahoma
Feb 18, 1989		Hawaii	W 57–56	15–8 (7–4)	Moby Arena; Fort Collins, Colorado
Feb 20, 1989		Air Force	W 58–53	16–8 (8–4)	Moby Arena; Fort Collins, Colorado
Feb 23, 1989		UTEP	W 81–68	17–8 (9–4)	Moby Arena; Fort Collins, Colorado
Feb 25, 1989		at Wyoming	W 62–59	18–8 (10–4)	Arena-Auditorium; Laramie, Wyoming
Mar 2, 1989		at Utah	W 75–64	19–8 (11–4)	Jon M. Huntsman Center; Salt Lake City, Utah
Mar 4, 1989		at BYU	W 89–72	20–8 (12–4)	Marriott Center; Provo, Utah
WAC tournament
Mar 8, 1989*	(1)	vs. (8) Utah; Quarterfinals	W 52–50	21–8	Jon M. Huntsman Center; Salt Lake City, Utah
Mar 9, 1989*	(1)	vs. (4) Hawaii; Semifinals	W 50–46	22–8	Jon M. Huntsman Center; Salt Lake City, Utah
Mar 11, 1989*	(1)	vs. (2) UTEP; Championship	L 60–73	22–9	Jon M. Huntsman Center; Salt Lake City, Utah
NCAA tournament
Mar 17, 1989*	(10 MW)	vs. (7 MW) Florida; First Round	W 68–46	23–9	Reunion Arena; Dallas, Texas
Mar 19, 1989*	(10 MW)	vs. (2 MW) No. 7 Syracuse; Second Round	L 50–65	23–10	Reunion Arena; Dallas, Texas
*Non-conference game. ^{#}Rankings from AP Poll. (#) Tournament seedings in parentheses. MW=Midwest.

== NBA draft ==
Round	Pick	Player	NBA Club
2	35	Pat Durham	Dallas Mavericks
