= 1983–84 BYU Cougars men's basketball team =

American college basketball season

1983–84 BYU Cougars men's basketball

NCAA tournament, Second round
- Conference: Western Athletic Conference
- Record: 20–11 (12–4 WAC)
- Head coach: LaDell Andersen (5th season)
- Home arena: Marriott Center

1983–84 WAC men's basketball standings
	Conf.				Overall
Team	W		L	PCT	W		L	PCT
No. 9 UTEP †	13	–	3	.813	27	–	4	.871
BYU	12	–	4	.750	20	–	11	.645
New Mexico	10	–	6	.625	24	–	11	.686
Wyoming	9	–	7	.563	17	–	13	.567
Colorado State	9	–	7	.563	16	–	14	.533
Hawaii	6	–	10	.375	12	–	16	.429
San Diego State	6	–	10	.375	15	–	13	.536
Utah	4	–	12	.250	11	–	19	.367
Air Force	3	–	13	.188	8	–	19	.296
† 1984 WAC tournament winner Rankings from AP poll

The 1983–84 BYU Cougars men's basketball team represented Brigham Young University as a member of the Western Athletic Conference during the 1983–84 basketball season. Led by head coach LaDell Andersen, the Cougars compiled a record of 20–11 (12–4 WAC) to finish second in the WAC regular season standings. The team played their home games at the Marriott Center in Provo, Utah. The Cougars received an at-large bid to the NCAA tournament as No. 8 seed in the Mideast region. In the opening round, BYU defeated UAB before losing to No. 1 seed Kentucky 93–68 in the round of 32.

== Roster ==
1983–84 BYU Cougars men's basketball team
Players
Coaches

Pos.	#	Name	Height	Weight	Year	Hometown
F	4	Michael Smith	6 ft 10 in (2.08 m)	220 lb (100 kg)	Fr	Hacienda Heights, California
F	35	Devin Durrant	6 ft 7 in (2.01 m)	200 lb (91 kg)	Sr	Provo, Utah
F		Brett Applegate	6 ft 8 in (2.03 m)	—	Sr

Head coach

- LaDell Andersen

Assistant coach(es)

Legend

- (C) Team captain
- (S) Suspended
- (I) Ineligible
- (W) Walk-on
- Injured
- Current redshirt

== Schedule and results ==
Date time, TV	Rank^{#}	Opponent^{#}	Result	Record	Site city, state
Regular Season
Nov 26, 1983*		at Utah State	L 78–90	0–1	Dee Glen Smith Spectrum; Logan, Utah
Nov 30, 1983*		Hofstra	W 119–84	1–1	Marriott Center; Provo, Utah
Dec 9, 1983*		Utah State	L 81–83	1–2	Marriott Center; Provo, Utah
Dec 10, 1983*		Saint Mary's	W 106–74	2–2	Marriott Center; Provo, Utah
Dec 16, 1983*		vs. VCU; UK Invitational	W 81–77	3–2	Rupp Arena; Lexington, Kentucky
Dec 17, 1983*		at No. 2 Kentucky; UK Invitational	L 59–93	3–3	Rupp Arena; Lexington, Kentucky
Dec 21, 1983*		Oregon	W 79–78	4–3	Marriott Center; Provo, Utah
Dec 23, 1983*		Boise State	W 66–54	5–3	Marriott Center; Provo, Utah
Dec 28, 1983*		at No. 7 UCLA	L 73–82	5–4	Pauley Pavilion; Los Angeles, California
Jan 7, 1984*		Weber State	W 86–81	6–4	Marriott Center; Provo, Utah
Jan 14, 1984		Utah	W 113–105	7–4 (1–0)	Marriott Center; Provo, Utah
Mar 3, 1984		New Mexico	W 80–73	19–9 (12–4)	Marriott Center; Provo, Utah
WAC Tournament
Mar 9, 1984*		vs. New Mexico; Quarterfinals	L 55–64	19–10	Special Events Center; El Paso, Texas
NCAA tournament
Mar 15, 1984*	(8 ME)	at (9 ME) UAB; First round	W 84–68	20–10	Birmingham-Jefferson Civic Center (7,105); Birmingham, Alabama
Mar 17, 1984*	(8 ME)	vs. (1 ME) No. 3 Kentucky; Second round	L 68–93	20–11	Birmingham-Jefferson Civic Center; Birmingham, Alabama
*Non-conference game. ^{#}Rankings from AP Poll. (#) Tournament seedings in parentheses. ME=Mideast.

== Players in the 1993 NBA draft ==
Round	Pick	Player	NBA club
2	25	Devin Durrant	Phoenix Suns
