= 1984 WAC men's basketball tournament =

- Classification: Division I
- Season: 1983–84
- Teams: 8
- Site: Special Events Center; El Paso, TX
- Champions: UTEP (1st title)
- Winning coach: Don Haskins (1st title)
- MVP: Juden Smith (UTEP)

1983–84 WAC men's basketball standings
	Conf.				Overall
Team	W		L	PCT	W		L	PCT
No. 9 UTEP †	13	–	3	.813	27	–	4	.871
BYU	12	–	4	.750	20	–	11	.645
New Mexico	10	–	6	.625	24	–	11	.686
Wyoming	9	–	7	.563	17	–	13	.567
Colorado State	9	–	7	.563	16	–	14	.533
Hawaii	6	–	10	.375	12	–	16	.429
San Diego State	6	–	10	.375	15	–	13	.536
Utah	4	–	12	.250	11	–	19	.367
Air Force	3	–	13	.188	8	–	19	.296
† 1984 WAC tournament winner Rankings from AP poll

The 1984 Western Athletic Conference men's basketball tournament was held March 7–10 at the Special Events Center in El Paso, Texas. This was the first edition of the tournament.

Top-seeded UTEP defeated New Mexico in the inaugural championship game, 44–38, to clinch their first WAC men's tournament championship.

The Miners, in turn, received an automatic bid to the 1984 NCAA tournament while second-seeded BYU, who fell in the semifinal round, received an at-large bid.

== Bracket ==
First round Wednesday, March 7
5	Colorado State	61
8	Air Force	56
6	Hawaii	65
7	Utah	69

Quarterfinals; Thursday, March 8
4	Wyoming	40
5	Colorado State	36
3	New Mexico	56
7	Utah	45

Semifinals; Friday, March 9
1	#9 UTEP	62
4	Wyoming	55
2	BYU	55
3	New Mexico	64

Championship; Saturday, March 10
1	#9 UTEP	44
3	New Mexico	38
