= 2004 WAC men's basketball tournament =

- Classification: Division I
- Season: 2003–04
- Teams: 10
- Site: Save Mart Center at Fresno State; Fresno, California
- Champions: Nevada (1st title)
- Winning coach: Trent Johnson (1st title)
- MVP: Kirk Snyder (Nevada)

2003–04 WAC men's basketball standings
	Conf.				Overall
Team	W		L	PCT	W		L	PCT
Nevada †	13	–	5	.722	25	–	9	.735
UTEP	13	–	5	.722	24	–	8	.750
Boise State	12	–	6	.667	23	–	10	.697
Rice	12	–	6	.667	22	–	11	.667
Hawaii	11	–	7	.611	21	–	12	.636
Fresno State	10	–	8	.556	14	–	15	.483
Louisiana Tech	8	–	10	.444	15	–	15	.500
SMU	5	–	13	.278	12	–	18	.400
Tulsa	5	–	13	.278	9	–	20	.310
San Jose State	1	–	17	.056	6	–	23	.207
† 2004 WAC tournament winner

The 2004 WAC men's basketball tournament was held in the Save Mart Center at Fresno State in Fresno, California. The winners of the tournament were the #1 seeded Nevada Wolf Pack.

== Bracket ==
Play-in Round
8	SMU	79
9	Tulsa	60
10	San Jose State	51
7	Louisiana Tech	57

Quarterfinals
8	SMU	60
1	Nevada	75
5	Hawaii	68
4	Rice	70
6	Fresno State	54
3	Boise State	71
2	UTEP	62
7	Louisiana Tech	55

Semifinals
1	Nevada	67
4	Rice	59
3	Boise State	75
2	UTEP	83

Finals
1	Nevada	66
2	UTEP	60
