= David Padgett =

American basketball player-coach

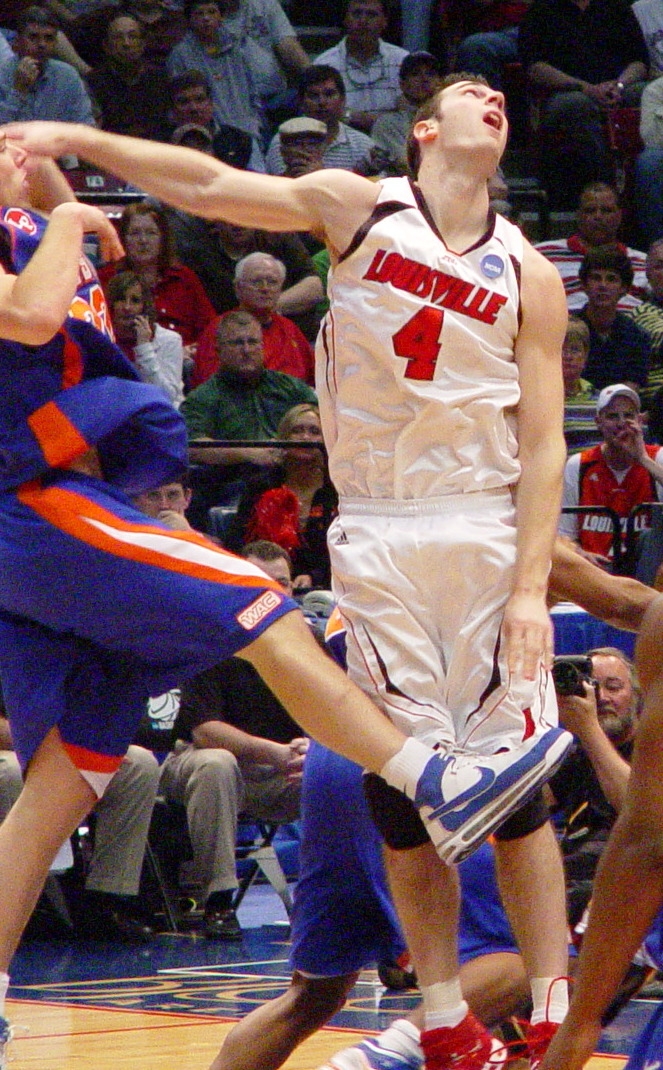

Personal information
- Born: February 13, 1985 (age 41) Reno, Nevada, U.S.
- Listed height: 6 ft 11 in (2.11 m)
- Listed weight: 245 lb (111 kg)

Career information
- High school: Reno (Reno, Nevada)
- College: Kansas (2003–2004); Louisville (2005–2008)
- NBA draft: 2008: undrafted
- Playing career: 2008–2010
- Position: Power forward / center
- Number: 4
- Coaching career: 2011–2018

Career history

Playing
- 2008–2009: CB Canarias
- 2009–2010: UB La Palma

Coaching
- 2011–2014: IUPUI (assistant)
- 2014–2015: Louisville (DBO)
- 2015–2017: Louisville (assistant)
- 2017–2018: Louisville (Interim HC)

Career highlights
- First-team All-Big East (2008); Second-team All-Big East (2007); First-team Parade All-American (2003); McDonald's All-American (2003)
Medals
Men's basketball
Representing the United States
FIBA Americas U18 Championship
Bronze medal – third place	2002 Isla Margarita	National team
FIBA Americas U20 Championship
Gold medal – first place	2004 Halifax	National team

David Christopher Padgett (born February 13, 1985) is an American former basketball coach and player. As a college basketball player, he played at Louisville after transferring from Kansas. He was the interim head coach at Louisville for the 2017–2018 season.

== High school ==
Born in Reno, Nevada, Padgett attended Reno High School, where he averaged 27 points and 14 rebounds per game his senior year. He was a McDonald's High School and a first-team Parade All-American. He also was a member of the 2004 USA Basketball Junior World Championship Qualifying Team, earning a gold medal at the event.

As a high school senior, he was the top-rated center and considered the fourth-rated prospect overall by Inside Hoops, the seventh overall by Rivals Hoops, and fifteenth overall by ESPN.com. In 2003, he was the Nevada player of the year.

== College career ==
=== Kansas (2003–2004) ===
Padgett committed to the University of Kansas in 2003 in Roy Williams' last season as the head coach. He decided to remain at Kansas after Williams left for the University of North Carolina and Bill Self became the head coach. His most memorable moment at Kansas came when he made the game winning shot in an 84–82 victory against Missouri in what turned out to be the last basketball game at the Hearnes Center.

=== Louisville (2005–2008) ===
After his freshman year, Padgett decided to transfer to the University of Louisville. NCAA rules dictated that he redshirted and would sit out for the 2004–2005 season, during which the Cardinals made it to the Final Four.

Padgett served as team captain with Taquan Dean. His team debut against Prairie View A&M was the third-highest scoring debut of any Cardinal at 17 points. He scored a career-high 27 points and eight rebounds against UConn.

Padgett scored in double-figures in 14 games in the 2006-2007 season. The Cardinals' leader in field goal percentage (59.7%, fourth in the Big East Conference), Padgett averaged 9.5 points and 5.6 rebounds per game. He was named to the All-Big East Conference Second Team.

At the beginning of his senior year, Padgett broke his kneecap in the season opener against Jackson State. He recovered quicker than expected and rejoined the team against Cincinnati on January 1, 2008. Padgett was a unanimous first-team selection for All-Big East.

Padgett's final year with Louisville came to end in the Elite Eight of the 2008 NCAA Men's Division I Basketball Tournament. Though the #3 Cardinals lost to the #1 Tar Heels 83–73, Padgett was the Cardinals' top all around performer, finishing the game with 6 points, 8 rebounds, and 6 assists.

== Professional career ==
Though undrafted by an NBA team, Padgett was signed on July 2, 2008, by the Miami Heat, and added to its summer league team. However, Padgett was waived by the Heat on October 26, 2008.

After spending the 2008–09 season in Spain, Padgett was named to the Portland Trail Blazers 2009 summer league team. However, Padgett was not invited to training camp, and proceeded to play the next year in Spain with U.B. La Palma.

== Coaching career ==
Following his second season in Spain, Padgett unofficially retired and returned to Louisville as the team's assistant strength coach, working under his former head coach Rick Pitino. After spending the 2010–11 season in that position, he left to become a full-time assistant at IUPUI, serving in that role until IUPUI head coach Todd Howard was fired at the end of the 2013–14 season.

Padgett then returned to the Louisville program, and was initially hired in the 2014 offseason as assistant video coordinator. Shortly after he was hired at U of L, he was promoted to director of basketball operations when Andre McGee left to become an assistant with UMKC. Padgett was promoted to an assistant coach position at U of L, in March 2015. Padgett was named acting head coach at Louisville on September 29, 2017, amid FBI investigations of various basketball programs that ultimately led to the firings of both Pitino and athletic director Tom Jurich.

Following Louisville's loss in the NIT, they announced that Padgett would not be retained as head coach.

== Head coaching record ==
=== College ===
Record table
Season	Team	Overall	Conference	Standing	Postseason
Louisville Cardinals (Atlantic Coast Conference) (2017–2018)
2017–18	Louisville	22–14	9–9	T–8th	NIT Quarterfinals
Louisville:		22–14 (.611)	9–9 (.500)		
Total:		22–14 (.611)			
National champion Postseason invitational champion Conference regular season champion Conference regular season and conference tournament champion Division regular season champion Division regular season and conference tournament champion Conference tournament champion

== Personal ==
Padgett's father, Pete, played for the University of Nevada, his uncle played for the University of New Mexico, his grandfather, Jim, played for Oregon State, and his sister, Melissa, played for the University of San Diego.

He has a wife, Megan, and two sons, Nolan and Gavin. He resides in Louisville.

Padgett left coaching following the 2017–18 season and now works as a financial advisor for Farnsley Advisors in Louisville. He also serves as a commentator for college basketball telecasts on ESPN.
