= 1983–84 UTEP Miners men's basketball team =

American college basketball season

1983–84 UTEP Miners men's basketball

WAC Regular Season Champions WAC Tournament champions

NCAA tournament, Second Round
- Conference: Western Athletic Conference

Ranking
- Coaches: No. 9
- AP: No. 9
- Record: 27–4 (13–3 WAC)
- Head coach: Don Haskins (23rd season)
- Assistant coaches: Tim Floyd; Jim Forbes; Rus Bradburd
- Home arena: Special Events Center

1983–84 WAC men's basketball standings
	Conf.				Overall
Team	W		L	PCT	W		L	PCT
No. 9 UTEP †	13	–	3	.813	27	–	4	.871
BYU	12	–	4	.750	20	–	11	.645
New Mexico	10	–	6	.625	24	–	11	.686
Wyoming	9	–	7	.563	17	–	13	.567
Colorado State	9	–	7	.563	16	–	14	.533
Hawaii	6	–	10	.375	12	–	16	.429
San Diego State	6	–	10	.375	15	–	13	.536
Utah	4	–	12	.250	11	–	19	.367
Air Force	3	–	13	.188	8	–	19	.296
† 1984 WAC tournament winner Rankings from AP poll

The 1983–84 UTEP Miners men's basketball team represented the University of Texas at El Paso as a member of the Western Athletic Conference during the 1983–84 college basketball season. The team was led by head coach Don Haskins. The Miners finished 27–4 (13–3 in WAC), won the conference tournament title, and reached the NCAA tournament.

== Roster ==
1983–84 UTEP Miners men's basketball team
Players
Coaches

Pos.	#	Name	Height	Weight	Year	Hometown
G	10	Luster Goodwin	6 ft 1 in (1.85 m)	—	Jr
G/F	21	Juden Smith	6 ft 6 in (1.98 m)	190 lb (86 kg)	Jr	New Orleans, Louisiana
F	32	Fred Reynolds	6 ft 6 in (1.98 m)	205 lb (93 kg)	Sr	Houston, Texas
PF	31	Kevin Hamilton	6 ft 7 in (2.01 m)	210 lb (95 kg)	So	Los Angeles, California
C	33	Dave Feitl	6 ft 11 in (2.11 m)	230 lb (104 kg)	So	Tucson, Arizona
G/F	25	Kent Lockhart	6 ft 5 in (1.96 m)	190 lb (86 kg)	Jr	Palo Alto, California
	43	Paul Cunningham	6 ft 7 in (2.01 m)	195 lb (88 kg)	Jr	Houston, Texas
F	11	Quinten Gates	6 ft 7 in (2.01 m)	200 lb (91 kg)	So	Los Angeles, California
PF	20	Wayne Campbell	6 ft 7 in (2.01 m)	190 lb (86 kg)	So	New Orleans, Louisiana
PF	42	Rod Nealy	6 ft 7 in (2.01 m)	205 lb (93 kg)	Sr	Detroit, Michigan
SG	24	Anthony Bailey	6 ft 0 in (1.83 m)	190 lb (86 kg)	Sr	Los Angeles, California
SF	30	Jeff Roberson	6 ft 4 in (1.93 m)	200 lb (91 kg)	Sr	Houston, Texas
		Lemuel Clanton	6 ft 2 in (1.88 m)	180 lb (82 kg)	Jr	New Orleans, Louisiana

Head coach

- Don Haskins

Assistant coach(es)

- Tim Floyd
- Rus Bradburd

Legend

- (C) Team captain
- (S) Suspended
- (I) Ineligible
- (W) Walk-on
- Injured
- Current redshirt

== Schedule and results ==
Date time, TV	Rank^{#}	Opponent^{#}	Result	Record	Site city, state
Non-conference Regular Season
Nov 26, 1983*		Texas Southern	W 91–61	1–0	Special Events Center (11,127); El Paso, Texas
Nov 29, 1983*		New Mexico State	W 62–49	2–0	Special Events Center (12,222); El Paso, Texas
Dec 3, 1983*		at New Mexico State	W 60–59	3–0	Pan American Center (13,691); Las Cruces, New Mexico
Dec 6, 1983*		Southern	W 83–67	4–0	Special Events Center (10,321); El Paso, Texas
Dec 10, 1983*		Indiana	W 65–61	5–0	Special Events Center (12,222); El Paso, Texas
Dec 16, 1983*	No. 20	St. Mary's	W 64–57	6–0	Special Events Center (9,321); El Paso, Texas
Dec 19, 1983*	No. 18	Louisiana Tech	W 82–70	7–0	Special Events Center (11,221); El Paso, Texas
Dec 22, 1983*	No. 18	at Arizona State	W 60–55	8–0	Wells Fargo Arena (5,774); Tempe, Arizona
Dec 27, 1983*	No. 16	No. 15 Michigan; Sun Carnival Classic Tournament	W 72–71	9–0	Special Events Center (11,539); El Paso, Texas
Dec 28, 1983*	No. 16	Arizona; Sun Carnival Classic Tournament	W 51–49 ^{OT}	10–0	Special Events Center (11,984); El Paso, Texas
Dec 30, 1983*	No. 16	Alcorn State	W 70–57	11–0	Special Events Center (11,313); El Paso, Texas
Jan 5, 1984*	No. 10	U.S. International	W 85–59	12–0	Special Events Center (9,211); El Paso, Texas
WAC Regular Season
Jan 7, 1984	No. 10	Air Force	W 72–50	13–0 (1–0)	Special Events Center (11,341); El Paso, Texas
Jan 12, 1984	No. 8	San Diego State	W 75–59	14–0 (2–0)	Special Events Center (12,222); El Paso, Texas
Jan 14, 1984	No. 5	Hawaii	W 74–54	15–0 (3–0)	Special Events Center (12,222); El Paso, Texas
Jan 19, 1984	No. 5	at Colorado State	L 51–63	15–1 (3–1)	Moby Arena (6,927); Fort Collins, Colorado
Jan 21, 1984	No. 8	at Wyoming	W 54–46	16–1 (4–1)	Arena-Auditorium (12,436); Laramie, Wyoming
Jan 23, 1984	No. 8	at Air Force	W 65–52	17–1 (5–1)	Clune Arena (2,500); Colorado Springs, Colorado
Jan 28, 1984	No. 7	at New Mexico	W 60–59	18–1 (6–1)	The Pit (arena) (18,372); Albuquerque, New Mexico
Feb 2, 1984	No. 7	Utah	W 74–54	19–1 (7–1)	Special Events Center (12,222); El Paso, Texas
Feb 4, 1984	No. 7	Brigham Young	W 85–77	20–1 (8–1)	Special Events Center (12,222); El Paso, Texas
Feb 9, 1984	No. 7	at San Diego State	L 62–73	20–2 (8–2)	Peterson Gymnasium (3,866); San Diego, California
Feb 11, 1984	No. 10	at Hawaii	W 77–58	21–2 (9–2)	Neal S. Blaisdell Center (3,574); Honolulu, Hawaii
Feb 18, 1984	No. 10	Wyoming	W 73–66 ^{OT}	22–2 (10–2)	Special Events Center (12,222); El Paso, Texas
Feb 20, 1984	No. 9	Colorado State	W 62–55	23–2 (11–2)	Special Events Center (12,222); El Paso, Texas
Feb 25, 1984	No. 8	New Mexico	W 75–66	24–2 (12–2)	Special Events Center (12,222); El Paso, Texas
Mar 1, 1984	No. 8	at Brigham Young	L 65–83	24–3 (12–3)	Marriott Center (22,793); Provo, Utah
Mar 3, 1984	No. 8	at Utah	W 55–54	25–3 (13–3)	Jon M. Huntsman Center (12,069); Salt Lake City, Utah
WAC tournament
Mar 9, 1984*	No. 9	Wyoming; Semifinals	W 62–55	26–3	Special Events Center (12,010); El Paso, Texas
Mar 10, 1984*	No. 9	New Mexico; Championship game	W 44–38	27–3	Special Events Center (12,010); El Paso, Texas
NCAA tournament
Mar 17, 1984*	(4 W) No. 9	vs. (5 W) No. 13 UNLV; Second round	L 60–73	27–4	Jon M. Huntsman Center (8,523); Salt Lake City, Utah
*Non-conference game. ^{#}Rankings from AP Poll. (#) Tournament seedings in parentheses. W=West.

== NBA draft ==
Round	Pick	Player	NBA club
2	44	Fred Reynolds	Washington Bullets
