= 2003–04 Hawaii Rainbow Warriors basketball team =

American college basketball season

2003–04 Hawaii Rainbow Warriors basketball

NIT, Quarterfinals
- Conference: Western Athletic Conference
- Record: 21–12 (11–7 WAC)
- Head coach: Riley Wallace (17th season)
- Associate head coach: Bob Nash (17th season)
- Assistant coaches: Jackson Wheeler (14th season); Bob Burke (2nd season)
- Home arena: Stan Sheriff Center

2003–04 WAC men's basketball standings
| | Conf. | | | | Overall |
| Team | W | | L | PCT | W | | L | PCT |
|---|---|---|---|---|---|---|---|---|
| Nevada † | 13 | – | 5 | .722 | 25 | – | 9 | .735 |
| UTEP | 13 | – | 5 | .722 | 24 | – | 8 | .750 |
| Boise State | 12 | – | 6 | .667 | 23 | – | 10 | .697 |
| Rice | 12 | – | 6 | .667 | 22 | – | 11 | .667 |
| Hawaii | 11 | – | 7 | .611 | 21 | – | 12 | .636 |
| Fresno State | 10 | – | 8 | .556 | 14 | – | 15 | .483 |
| Louisiana Tech | 8 | – | 10 | .444 | 15 | – | 15 | .500 |
| SMU | 5 | – | 13 | .278 | 12 | – | 18 | .400 |
| Tulsa | 5 | – | 13 | .278 | 9 | – | 20 | .310 |
| San Jose State | 1 | – | 17 | .056 | 6 | – | 23 | .207 |
† 2004 WAC tournament winner

The 2003–04 Hawaii Rainbow Warriors basketball team represented the University of Hawaiʻi at Mānoa in the 2003–04 NCAA Division I men's basketball season. The Rainbow Warriors, led by head coach Riley Wallace, played their home games at the Stan Sheriff Center in Honolulu, Hawaii, as members of the Western Athletic Conference. Hawaii finished 5th in the WAC during the regular season, and lost in the first round in the WAC tournament to Rice.

Hawaii failed to qualify for the NCAA tournament, but was selected to participate in the NIT, the school's fourth consecutive appearance in the postseason. The Rainbow Warriors won their first game against #25 Utah State, the first road victory over a ranked opponent in school history. Hawaii won again to advance to the NIT quarterfinals, but were eliminated by eventual NIT champion Michigan, 88–73.

== Roster ==
2003–04 Hawaii Rainbow Warriors men's basketball team
Players
Coaches

| Pos. | # | Name | Height | Weight | Year | Hometown |
|---|---|---|---|---|---|---|
| F | 2 | Phil Martin | 6 ft 8 in (2.03 m) | — | Sr | Hamilton, Ontario, Canada |
| G | 3 | Jake Sottos | 6 ft 4 in (1.93 m) | — | Jr | Monmouth, Illinois |
| C | 12 | Milos Zivanovic | 6 ft 11 in (2.11 m) | — | RS So | Belgrade, Serbia and Montenegro |
| G | 13 | Jason Carter | 5 ft 10 in (1.78 m) | — | Sr | Gary, Indiana |
| F/C | 14 | Haim Shimonovich | 6 ft 10 in (2.08 m) | — | Sr | Rishon LeZion, Israel |
| G | 20 | Logan Lee | 6 ft 2 in (1.88 m) | — | So | San Antonio, Texas |
| G/F | 22 | Vaidotas Peciukas | 6 ft 7 in (2.01 m) | — | Jr | Joniškis, Lithuania |
| G/F | 24 | Michael Kuebler | 6 ft 5 in (1.96 m) | — | Sr | Salem, Oregon |
| G/F | 33 | Bobby Nash | 6 ft 6 in (1.98 m) | — | Fr | Honolulu, Hawaii |
| F | 34 | Jeff Blackett | 6 ft 8 in (2.03 m) | — | Jr | Ogden, Utah |
| F | 40 | Paul Jesinskis | 6 ft 8 in (2.03 m) | — | RS Sr | Assagay, South Africa |
| F | 41 | Julian Sensley | 6 ft 9 in (2.06 m) | — | So | Kailua, Hawaii |
| F | 54 | Nkeruwem Akpan | 6 ft 8 in (2.03 m) | — | Jr | Akwa Ibom, Nigeria |

Head coach

- Riley Wallace (Centenary)

Assistant coach(es)

- Bob Nash (Hawaiʻi)
- Jackson Wheeler (Marymount (KS))
- Bob Burke (Campbell)

Legend

- (C) Team captain
- (S) Suspended
- (I) Ineligible
- (W) Walk-on
- Injured
- Current redshirt

Roster
Last update: January 19, 2023

== Schedule and results ==
| Date time, TV | Rank^{#} | Opponent^{#} | Result | Record | Site (attendance) city, state |
Preseason
| November 17, 2003*; 7:05 pm | | BYU–Hawaii; Exhibition | W 63–56 | — | Stan Sheriff Center; Honolulu, HI |
Regular season
| November 21, 2003*; 7:05 pm | | UC Santa Barbara | L 51–57 | 0–1 | Stan Sheriff Center (6,058); Honolulu, HI |
| November 24, 2003*; 6:30 pm, ESPN2 | | vs. Santa Clara; Maui Invitational | W 56–43 | 1–1 | Lahaina Civic Center (2,500); Lahaina, HI |
| November 25, 2003*; 5:00 pm, ESPN2 | | vs. Chaminade; Maui Invitational | W 68–54 | 2–1 | Lahaina Civic Center (2,500); Lahaina, HI |
| November 26, 2003*; 4:30 pm | | vs. Dayton; Maui Invitational | L 72–82 | 2–2 | Lahaina Civic Center (2,500); Lahaina, HI |
| December 7, 2003*; 4:05 pm | | EA Sports All-Stars; Exhibition | W 69–67 | — | Stan Sheriff Center; Honolulu, HI |
| December 15, 2003*; 7:05 pm | | Oregon State | W 70–67 ^{OT} | 3–2 | Stan Sheriff Center (5,752); Honolulu, HI |
| December 19, 2003*; 7:05 pm | | Texas Southern; Adidas Festival | W 97–67 | 4–2 | Stan Sheriff Center (5,694); Honolulu, HI |
| December 20, 2003*; 7:05 pm | | New Orleans; Adidas Festival | W 92–64 | 5–2 | Stan Sheriff Center (6,954); Honolulu, HI |
| December 27, 2003*; 7:35 pm | | Lamar; Rainbow Classic | W 94–88 | 6–2 | Stan Sheriff Center (6,997); Honolulu, HI |
| December 29, 2003*; 7:35 pm | | IUPUI; Rainbow Classic | W 82–64 | 7–2 | Stan Sheriff Center (6,892); Honolulu, HI |
| December 30, 2003*; 7:05 am | | Fairfield; Rainbow Classic | W 50–49 ^{OT} | 8–2 | Stan Sheriff Center (7,384); Honolulu, HI |
| January 3, 2004; 7:05 pm | | Fresno State | L 58–69 | 8–3 (0–1) | Stan Sheriff Center (7,798); Honolulu, HI |
| January 5, 2004; 7:05 pm | | Nevada | W 60–53 | 9–3 (1–1) | Stan Sheriff Center (6,155); Honolulu, HI |
| January 10, 2004; 4:00 pm | | at San Jose State | W 83–76 | 10–3 (2–1) | Event Center Arena (1,354); San Jose, CA |
| January 15, 2004; 3:05 pm | | at SMU | W 66–65 | 11–3 (3–1) | Moody Coliseum (2,743); Dallas, TX |
| January 17, 2004; 3:00 pm | | at Louisiana Tech | W 67–60 | 12–3 (4–1) | Thomas Assembly Center (2,679); Ruston, LA |
| January 22, 2004; 7:05 pm | | UTEP | W 85–63 | 13–3 (5–1) | Stan Sheriff Center (6,903); Honolulu, HI |
| January 24, 2004; 7:05 pm | | Boise State | W 64–58 | 14–3 (6–1) | Stan Sheriff Center (8,962); Honolulu, HI |
| January 28, 2004; 3:05 pm | | at Rice | L 73–76 | 14–4 (6–2) | Rice Gymnasium (2,923); Houston, TX |
| January 31, 2004; 10:05 am | | at Tulsa | W 73–71 ^{2OT} | 15–4 (7–2) | Reynolds Center (7,604); Tulsa, OK |
| February 7, 2004; 7:05 pm | | San Jose State | W 56–55 | 16–4 (8–2) | Stan Sheriff Center (8,337); Honolulu, HI |
| February 12, 2004; 7:05 pm | | Louisiana Tech | L 61–62 | 16–5 (8–3) | Stan Sheriff Center (7,476); Honolulu, HI |
| February 14, 2004; 7:05 pm | | SMU | W 62–59 | 17–5 (9–3) | Stan Sheriff Center (7,883); Honolulu, HI |
| February 18, 2004; 4:30 pm | | at Boise State | L 57–74 | 17–6 (9–4) | BSU Pavilion (5,033); Boise, ID |
| February 21, 2004*; 7:00 pm | | at No. 20 Southern Illinois; ESPN BracketBusters | L 62–66 | 17–7 | SIU Arena (9,628); Carbondale, IL |
| February 23, 2004; 4:05 pm | | at UTEP | L 62–71 | 17–8 (9–5) | Don Haskins Center (12,000); El Paso, TX |
| February 27, 2004; 7:05 pm | | Tulsa | W 92–62 | 18–8 (10–5) | Stan Sheriff Center (7,780); Honolulu, HI |
| February 29, 2004; 3:05 pm | | Rice | W 91–77 | 19–8 (11–5) | Stan Sheriff Center (9,214); Honolulu, HI |
| March 4, 2004; 5:05 pm | | at Nevada | L 64–77 | 19–9 (11–6) | Lawlor Events Center (10,153); Reno, NV |
| March 6, 2004; 5:00 pm | | at Fresno State | L 60–69 | 19–10 (11–7) | Save Mart Center (14,222); Fresno, CA |
WAC tournament
| March 11, 2004; 12:35 pm | (5) | vs. (4) Rice; WAC Quarterfinals | L 68–70 | 19–11 | Save Mart Center (5,303); Fresno, CA |
NIT
| March 17, 2004; 4:05 pm | | at No. 25 Utah State; NIT First Round | W 85–74 | 20–11 | Smith Spectrum (8,976); Logan, UT |
| March 22, 2004; 6:00 pm | | Nebraska; NIT Second Round | W 84–83 | 21–11 | Stan Sheriff Center (10,300); Honolulu, HI |
| March 24, 2004; 4:05 pm | | at Michigan; NIT Quarterfinals | L 73–88 | 21–12 | Crisler Arena (10,306); Ann Arbor, MI |
*Non-conference game. ^{#}Rankings from AP Poll. (#) Tournament seedings in parentheses. All times are in Hawaiian Time.
