= 1989 WAC men's basketball tournament =

- Classification: Division I
- Season: 1988–89
- Teams: 9
- Site: Jon M. Huntsman Center; Salt Lake City, UT
- Champions: UTEP (3rd title)
- Winning coach: Don Haskins (3rd title)
- MVP: Tim Hardaway (UTEP)

1988–89 WAC men's basketball standings
	Conf.				Overall
Team	W		L	PCT	W		L	PCT
Colorado State	12	–	4	.750	23	–	10	.697
UTEP †	11	–	5	.688	26	–	7	.788
New Mexico	11	–	5	.688	22	–	11	.667
Hawaii	9	–	7	.563	17	–	13	.567
BYU	7	–	9	.438	14	–	15	.483
Air Force	6	–	10	.375	14	–	14	.500
Wyoming	6	–	10	.375	14	–	17	.452
Utah	6	–	10	.375	16	–	17	.485
San Diego State	4	–	12	.250	12	–	17	.414
† 1989 WAC tournament winner Rankings from AP Poll

The 1989 Western Athletic Conference men's basketball tournament was held March 8–11 at the Jon M. Huntsman Center at the University of Utah in Salt Lake City, Utah.

UTEP defeated top-seeded Colorado State in the championship game, 73–60, to clinch their third WAC men's tournament championship

The Miners, in turn, received an automatic bid to the 1989 NCAA tournament. They were joined in the tournament by regular season champions Colorado State, who earned an at-large bid.

== Format ==
The tournament field remained fixed at nine teams, and teams were again seeded based on regular season conference records. All teams were entered into the quarterfinal round with the exception of the two lowest-seeded teams, who played in the preliminary first round to determine who would then play against the tournament's top seed.

== Bracket ==
First round Wednesday, March 8
9	San Diego State	57
8	Utah	70

Quarterfinals; Wednesday, March 8 Thursday, March 9
1	Colorado State	52
8	Utah	50
5	BYU	69
4	Hawaii	72
3	New Mexico	74
6	Air Force	60
7	Wyoming	81
2	UTEP	88**

Semifinals; Thursday, March 9 Friday, March 10
1	Colorado State	50
4	Hawaii	46
3	New Mexico	57
2	UTEP	89

Championship; Saturday, March 11
1	Colorado State	60
2	UTEP	73
