= Johnny High =

American basketball player (1957–1987)

Personal information
- Born: April 25, 1957 Birmingham, Alabama, U.S.
- Died: June 13, 1987 (aged 30) Phoenix, Arizona, U.S.
- Listed height: 6 ft 3 in (1.91 m)
- Listed weight: 185 lb (84 kg)

Career information
- High school: Jones Valley (Birmingham, Alabama)
- College: Lawson State CC (1975–1977); Nevada (1977–1979)
- NBA draft: 1979: 2nd round, 24th overall pick
- Drafted by: Phoenix Suns
- Playing career: 1979–1986
- Position: Point guard / shooting guard
- Number: 12, 22, 11

Career history
- 1979–1981, 1982–1984: Phoenix Suns
- 1984: Wyoming Wildcatters
- 1984–1985: Cincinnati Slammers
- 1985–1986: Baltimore Lightning

Career NBA statistics
- Points: 1,396 (5.1 ppg)
- Rebounds: 617 (1.9 rpg)
- Assists: 525 (1.2 apg)
- Stats at NBA.com
- Stats at Basketball Reference

Johnny Harold "Sky" High (April 25, 1957 – June 13, 1987) was an American professional basketball player. He played four seasons in the National Basketball Association (NBA) with the Phoenix Suns.

Born in Birmingham, Alabama, High attended high school at Birmingham's Jones Valley High School. He went on to play college basketball at Lawson State Community College and University of Nevada and was selected by Phoenix in the second round of the 1979 NBA draft. As of February 2018, he is the last Nevada Wolf Pack player to achieve a triple double in a game. During an NBA game against Washington on January 28, 1981, High recorded nine steals.

In October 1981, High was traded to the Chicago Bulls for a third round draft pick. He failed to make the Bulls roster and played in an industrial league during the 1981–82 season. High returned to the Suns in July 1982 and was waived in December 1983. He signed two 10-day contracts with the Suns in January 1984 that marked his final stint with the team. High played in the Continental Basketball Association for the Wyoming Wildcatters, Cincinnati Slammers and Baltimore Lightning from 1984 to 1986.

In 1987, High testified before a Maricopa County grand jury that indicted 11 people – including five then-current or former Phoenix Suns players – on cocaine and drug charges.

High died in an early-morning automobile accident on June 13, 1987, in Phoenix, Arizona. He was working as a shoe salesman in Phoenix at the time of his death.

== Career statistics ==
Legend
GP	Games played	GS	Games started	MPG	Minutes per game
FG%	Field goal percentage	3P%	3-point field goal percentage	FT%	Free throw percentage
RPG	Rebounds per game	APG	Assists per game	SPG	Steals per game
BPG	Blocks per game	PPG	Points per game	**Bold**	Career high

=== NBA ===
==== Regular season ====
Year	Team	GP	GS	MPG	FG%	3P%	FT%	RPG	APG	SPG	BPG	PPG
1979–80	Phoenix	**82**		13.7	.446	.143	.674	2.1	1.5	.9	.2	5.0
1980–81	Phoenix	81		**21.6**	.427	.083	**.693**	**2.8**	**2.5**	**1.6**	.3	**8.4**
1982–83	Phoenix	**82**	2	14.1	**.461**	**.200**	.463	1.8	1.9	1.0	**.4**	3.2
1983–84	Phoenix	29	**9**	17.7	.346	.000	.345	2.3	1.8	1.4	**.4**	1.6
Career		274	11	16.6	.435	.105	.619	2.3	1.9	1.2	.3	5.1

==== Playoffs ====
Year	Team	GP	MPG	FG%	3P%	FT%	RPG	APG	SPG	BPG	PPG
1980	Phoenix	**8**	15.0	.387	.000	.500	3.1	**2.5**	.8	**.3**	4.0
1981	Phoenix	7	**16.7**	.424	–	**.643**	2.7	.9	.9	**.3**	**5.3**
1983	Phoenix	3	15.0	**.455**	.000	.000	**3.3**	2.0	**1.0**	**.3**	3.3
Career		18	15.7	.413	.000	.531	3.0	1.8	.8	.3	4.4

== See also ==
- List of National Basketball Association players with most steals in a game
