= Eddie Rivera =

Puerto Rican basketball player

Personal information
- Full name: Heriberto Rivera
- Nationality: Puerto Rican
- Born: 18 July 1970 (age 54); New York, New York, United States

Sport
- Sport: Basketball

Heriberto "Eddie" Rivera (born 7 July 1970) is a Puerto Rican basketball player. He competed in the men's tournament at the 1996 Summer Olympics.
