= Stefon Jackson =

American basketball player (born 1985)

Personal information
- Born: May 7, 1985 (age 41) Philadelphia, Pennsylvania, U.S.
- Listed height: 6 ft 5 in (1.96 m)
- Listed weight: 185 lb (84 kg)

Career information
- High school: Martin Luther King (Philadelphia, Pennsylvania); Lutheran Christian Academy (Philadelphia, Pennsylvania)
- College: UTEP (2005–2009)
- NBA draft: 2009: undrafted
- Playing career: 2009–2014
- Position: Shooting guard

Career history
- 2009: Darüşşafaka
- 2010: Olympia Larissa
- 2010–2011: Verviers-Pepinster
- 2011–2012: Generali Okapi Aalstar
- 2012–2014: Eisbären Bremerhaven
- 2014: S.Oliver Baskets

Career highlights
- Ethias League season scoring leader (2011)

Stefon Jackson (born May 7, 1985) is an American former professional basketball player. He is 6'5" tall and played shooting guard. While playing college basketball at UTEP between 2005 and 2009, Jackson scored a Conference USA-record 2,456 points (since broken by Marshall's Jon Elmore).

== High School ==
Jackson is from Philadelphia, Pennsylvania. He played at Martin Luther King High School for two years and was a first team all-Philadelphia Public League selection in 2002–03. His final two years he played at Lutheran Christian Academy, and as a senior in 2004–05 he helped lead the team to a 35–3 record and a #5 national ranking.

== College ==
In college, he played for the University of Texas at El Paso Miners and became the most prolific scorer in Conference USA history (later broken in 2019). He scored 2,456 points and set myriad C-USA records in the process. Through 2010–11, Jackson holds conference records for free throws made (21), attempted (27) and percentage (1.000; 20-for-20) in a game; free throws made (312) and attempted (374) in a season; free throws made (726) and attempted (945) in a career; three-pointers attempted in a game (27); points in a season (908); field goals attempted in a season (660); field goals made (810) and attempted (1,807) in a career; and the Conference USA men's basketball tournament championship game single game scoring record (38) among others. He finished fifth in the nation in points in 2008–09 while averaging 24.5 per game. Jackson was twice named to the All-Conference USA First Team and garnered some national All-America recognition his senior year.

=== Arrest ===
At the end of Jackson's junior season in 2007–08 he was arrested on a charge of hindering apprehension or prosecution. His cousin, Willie Harden, was allegedly responsible for a shooting in New Castle, Pennsylvania that wounded five people.

== Professional ==
Jackson went undrafted in the 2009 NBA draft and consequently signed with Turkish club Darüşşafaka SK. He only played four total games with the team, however, before signing with G.S. Olympia Larissa B.C.

In June 2014, he signed with S.Oliver Baskets.

== See also ==
- List of NCAA Division I men's basketball career free throw scoring leaders
