= Kent Lockhart =

American basketball player (1963–2023)

Personal information
- Born: April 25, 1963 Los Angeles County, California, U.S.
- Died: January 28, 2023 (aged 59)
- Listed height: 6 ft 5 in (1.96 m)
- Listed weight: 190 lb (86 kg)

Career information
- College: UTEP (1981–1985)
- NBA draft: 1985: 6th round, 119th overall pick
- Drafted by: New York Knicks
- Playing career: 1985–1991
- Position: Guard

Career history
- 1985–1986: Albany Patroons
- 1989–1991: Eastside Spectres

Career highlights
- All-NBL First Team (1989); All-NBL Second Team (1990)
- Stats at Basketball Reference

Kent Alexander Lockhart (April 25, 1963 – January 28, 2023) was an American professional basketball player. He played college basketball for the UTEP Miners and was drafted by the New York Knicks in the 1985 NBA draft. He had a three-year career in the National Basketball League (NBL) in Australia for the Eastside Spectres, where he was a two-time All-NBL Team recipient.

== Early life ==
Lockhart was born Los Angeles County, California, and hailed from Palo Alto, California.

== College career ==
Lockhart played four years of college basketball for the UTEP Miners. In 120 games between 1981 and 1985, he averaged 8.1 points, 2.9 rebounds and 2.3 assists in 26.5 minutes per game. As of 2022, his 279 career assists is ranked tenth all-time in UTEP Miners history.

== Professional career ==
=== NBA draft and CBA ===
Lockhart was selected by the New York Knicks in the sixth round of the 1985 NBA draft with the 119th overall pick. He went on to play four games for the Albany Patroons of the Continental Basketball Association (CBA) during the 1985–86 season.

=== Australia ===
Lockhart later moved to Australia and played for the Sandringham Sabres in the Victorian Basketball Association.

In 1989, Lockhart joined the Eastside Spectres and made his debut in the National Basketball League (NBL). He recorded a career-high 47 points during his first season and was named to the All-NBL First Team. He earned All-NBL Second Team honours in 1990 and played a starring role in the Spectres' run to the NBL Grand Final series against the Perth Wildcats in 1991. He averaged 24.3 points, 6.6 rebounds, 3.8 assists and 1.5 steals in his three-year NBL career, going at 51 per cent from the field across 81 games.

== Death ==
Lockhart died on January 28, 2023, at the age of 59.
