= 2003–04 UTEP Miners men's basketball team =

American college basketball season

2003–04 UTEP Miners men's basketball

WAC Regular season co-champions

NCAA tournament
- Conference: Western Athletic Conference
- Record: 24–8 (13–5 WAC)
- Head coach: Billy Gillispie (2nd season)
- Assistant coach: Doc Sadler (1st season)
- Home arena: Don Haskins Center

2003–04 WAC men's basketball standings
	Conf.				Overall
Team	W		L	PCT	W		L	PCT
Nevada †	13	–	5	.722	25	–	9	.735
UTEP	13	–	5	.722	24	–	8	.750
Boise State	12	–	6	.667	23	–	10	.697
Rice	12	–	6	.667	22	–	11	.667
Hawaii	11	–	7	.611	21	–	12	.636
Fresno State	10	–	8	.556	14	–	15	.483
Louisiana Tech	8	–	10	.444	15	–	15	.500
SMU	5	–	13	.278	12	–	18	.400
Tulsa	5	–	13	.278	9	–	20	.310
San Jose State	1	–	17	.056	6	–	23	.207
† 2004 WAC tournament winner

The 2003–04 UTEP Miners men's basketball team represented the University of Texas at El Paso as a member of the Western Athletic Conference during the 2004–05 college basketball season. The team was led by second-year head coach Billy Gillispie and played their home games at the Don Haskins Center in El Paso, Texas.

== Roster ==
2003–04 UTEP Miners men's basketball team
Players
Coaches

Pos.	#	Name	Height	Weight	Year	Hometown
F	1	Jason Williams	6 ft 6 in (1.98 m)	205 lb (93 kg)	So	New Orleans, Louisiana
G	4	Giovanni St. Amant	6 ft 3 in (1.91 m)	190 lb (86 kg)	So	Bellflower, California
F	5	Roy Smallwood	6 ft 6 in (1.98 m)	210 lb (95 kg)	Sr	Houston, Texas
G	10	Chris Craig	6 ft 1 in (1.85 m)	180 lb (82 kg)	Sr	Scottsdale, Arizona
G	21	Filiberto Rivera	6 ft 2 in (1.88 m)	175 lb (79 kg)	Jr	Carolina, Puerto Rico
F	33	Omar Thomas	6 ft 5 in (1.96 m)	205 lb (93 kg)	Jr	Philadelphia, Pennsylvania
C	40	John Tofi	6 ft 10 in (2.08 m)	250 lb (113 kg)	So	San Francisco, California

Head coach

- Billy Gillispie

Assistant coach(es)

- Doc Sadler

Legend

- (C) Team captain
- (S) Suspended
- (I) Ineligible
- (W) Walk-on
- Injured
- Current redshirt

== Schedule and results ==
Date time, TV	Rank^{#}	Opponent^{#}	Result	Record	Site city, state
Regular Season
Dec 3, 2003*		at Texas Tech	L 57–70	3–1	United Spirit Arena; Lubbock, Texas
Dec 6, 2003*		at New Mexico State	W 83–74	4–1	Pan American Center; Las Cruces, New Mexico
Dec 8, 2003*		Houston	W 88–61	5–1	Don Haskins Center; El Paso, Texas
Dec 17, 2003*		New Mexico State	W 85–60	6–1	Don Haskins Center; El Paso, Texas
Dec 28, 2003*		Rutgers	W 94–68	9–1	Don Haskins Center; El Paso, Texas
Jan 3, 2004		Boise State	L 94–98	9–2 (0–1)	Don Haskins Center; El Paso, Texas
WAC tournament
Mar 11, 2004*		vs. Louisiana Tech; Quarterfinals	W 62–55	23–6	Save Mart Center; Fresno, California
Mar 12, 2004*		vs. Boise State; Semifinals	W 85–73	24–6	Save Mart Center; Fresno, California
Mar 13, 2004*		vs. Nevada; Championship game	L 60–66	24–7	Save Mart Center; Fresno, California
NCAA tournament
Mar 18, 2004*	(13 PHX)	vs. (4 PHX) No. 19 Maryland; First round	L 83–86	24–8	The Pepsi Center; Denver, Colorado
*Non-conference game. ^{#}Rankings from AP Poll. (#) Tournament seedings in parentheses. PHX=Phoenix.
