= Pete Padgett =

American basketball coach

Personal information
- Born: June 8, 1954 (age 72) San Jose, California, U.S.
- Listed height: 6 ft 8 in (2.03 m)
- Listed weight: 220 lb (100 kg)

Career information
- High school: Del Valle Continuation (Livermore, California)
- College: Nevada (1972–1976)
- NBA draft: 1976: 6th round, 88th overall pick
- Drafted by: Atlanta Hawks
- Position: Power forward
- Coaching career: 1977–2003

Career history

Coaching
- 1977–1980: Carson HS (assistant)
- 1980–1995: Carson HS
- 1995–2000: Reno HS
- 2000–2001: UC Santa Barbara (assistant)
- 2001–2003: Reno HS

Career highlights
- 3× First-team All-WCC (1974–1976); Second-team All-WCC (1973); WCC Rookie of the Year (1973)
- Stats at Basketball Reference

Peter L. Padgett (born June 15, 1954) is an American former basketball player and coach. He is best known, however, for his playing career between 1972–73 and 1975–76 while on the Nevada Wolf Pack men's basketball team.

== Playing career ==
Pete Padgett played for his father, Jim Padgett, the head coach at Nevada. Padgett, who is 6 ft 8 in (2.03 m), played the power forward position and became one of the most statistically accomplished players in school history. Padgett was selected to the all-conference second team during his freshman year, then was subsequently picked as a first team all-conference member for his final three seasons. Padgett led the West Coast Athletic Conference in rebounding all four seasons and finished his career with 1,464 total, a sum good enough to place him in the top ten all-time in the NCAA's modern era.

Although rebounding was his specialty, Padgett finished his career with 1,642 points, which at the time was the third-highest in school history. He also set a conference-record by accumulating 784 assists (in conference games only). As a senior he was honored with the Doc Martie Award, given annually to the University of Nevada's top male athlete. Padgett was then chosen in the sixth round (88th overall) by the Atlanta Hawks in the 1976 NBA draft, but he never played in the league.

Padgett was a two-sport star who also played baseball.

== Coaching career ==
After college, Padgett stayed at school for one additional year to earn his master's degree in education administration. In 1977, he began his coaching career at Carson High School in Carson City, Nevada. He served as an assistant coach from 1977 to 1980, and then took over head coaching duties in 1980. For the next 15 years he guided the school's boys' basketball program before leaving to coach at Reno High School. Padgett spent five years at the school, and then prior to the 2000–01 NCAA Division I season he joined the staff at UC Santa Barbara. However, his time as an assistant coach at the college level was short-lived, and he left after one year to return to Reno High School where he coached for another two years before retiring.

== Personal ==
Pete and his wife, Debra A. Padgett, have one daughter, Melissa, and one son, David C. Padgett. David played basketball for Kansas and Louisville; he later went on to become an assistant at IUPUI and Louisville before being named interim head coach at Louisville in 2017 following revelations of the possible involvement of previous Louisville head coach Rick Pitino in a pay-for-play scandal.

== See also ==
- List of NCAA Division I men's basketball career rebounding leaders
