= 1988–89 UTEP Miners men's basketball team =

American college basketball season

1988–89 UTEP Miners men's basketball

WAC tournament champions

NCAA tournament, second round
- Conference: Western Athletic Conference
- Record: 26–7 (11–5 WAC)
- Head coach: Don Haskins (28th season)
- Home arena: Special Events Center

1988–89 WAC men's basketball standings
	Conf.				Overall
Team	W		L	PCT	W		L	PCT
Colorado State	12	–	4	.750	23	–	10	.697
UTEP †	11	–	5	.688	26	–	7	.788
New Mexico	11	–	5	.688	22	–	11	.667
Hawaii	9	–	7	.563	17	–	13	.567
BYU	7	–	9	.438	14	–	15	.483
Air Force	6	–	10	.375	14	–	14	.500
Wyoming	6	–	10	.375	14	–	17	.452
Utah	6	–	10	.375	16	–	17	.485
San Diego State	4	–	12	.250	12	–	17	.414
† 1989 WAC tournament winner Rankings from AP Poll

The 1988–89 UTEP Miners men's basketball team represented the University of Texas at El Paso in the 1988–89 college basketball season. The team was led by head coach Don Haskins. The Miners finished 26–7 (11–5 in WAC), won the WAC tournament championship, and reached the second round of the NCAA tournament.

Senior Tim Hardaway completed his eligibility as the school's career leading in scoring, assists, and steals.

== Roster ==
1988–89 UTEP Miners men's basketball team
Players
Coaches

Pos.	#	Name	Height	Weight	Year	Hometown
G	10	Tim Hardaway (C)	6 ft 0 in (1.83 m)	160 lb (73 kg)	Sr	Chicago, Illinois
F	34	Antonio Davis	6 ft 9 in (2.06 m)	220 lb (100 kg)	Jr	Oakland, California
F/C	44	Greg Foster	6 ft 11 in (2.11 m)	230 lb (104 kg)	Jr	Oakland, California

Head coach

- Don Haskins

Assistant coach(es)

Legend

- (C) Team captain
- (S) Suspended
- (I) Ineligible
- (W) Walk-on
- Injured
- Current redshirt

== Schedule and results ==
Date time, TV	Rank^{#}	Opponent^{#}	Result	Record	Site city, state
Regular season
Nov 26, 1988*		Fort Lewis	W 109–47	1–0	Special Events Center (7,559); El Paso, Texas
Nov 28, 1988*		Texas Southern	W 90–82	2–0	Special Events Center (8,119); El Paso, Texas
Nov 30, 1988*		at New Mexico State	W 59–51	3–0	Pan American Center (11,652); Las Cruces, New Mexico
Dec 2, 1988*		Alcorn State	W 84–53	4–0	Special Events Center (6,691); El Paso, Texas
Dec 3, 1988*		Jackson State	W 85–54	5–0	Special Events Center (9,875); El Paso, Texas
Dec 6, 1988*		Prairie View	W 72–54	6–0	Special Events Center (7,661); El Paso, Texas
Dec 13, 1988*		New Mexico State	W 82–74	7–0	Special Events Center (12,222); El Paso, Texas
Dec 17, 1988*		at Indiana	L 63–81	7–1	Assembly Hall (14,823); Bloomington, Indiana
Dec 21, 1988*		Mississippi Valley State	W 69–56	8–1	Special Events Center (6,491); El Paso, Texas
Dec 27, 1988*		South Carolina State	W 91–68	9–1	Special Events Center (8,199); El Paso, Texas
Dec 29, 1988*		Cleveland State	W 96–54	10–1	Special Events Center (9,078); El Paso, Texas
Dec 30, 1988*		Maryland	W 69–51	11–1	Special Events Center (11,071); El Paso, Texas
Jan 5, 1989		Utah	W 82–66	12–1 (1–0)	Special Events Center (12,222); El Paso, Texas
Jan 7, 1989		BYU	W 91–76	13–1 (2–0)	Special Events Center (12,222); El Paso, Texas
Jan 12, 1989		at Wyoming	L 75–81	13–2 (2–1)	Arena-Auditorium (7,842); Laramie, Wyoming
Jan 14, 1989		at Air Force	W 81–71	14–2 (3–1)	Clune Arena (4,469); Fort Collins, Colorado
Jan 19, 1989		at San Diego State	W 76–65	15–2 (4–1)	Peterson Gym (5,675); San Diego, California
Jan 21, 1989		at Hawaii	L 72–87	15–3 (4–2)	Neal S. Blaisdell Center (3,703); Honolulu, Hawaii
Jan 24, 1989		Colorado State	W 69–53	16–3 (5–2)	Special Events Center (12,222); El Paso, Texas
Jan 28, 1989		at New Mexico	L 67–70	16–4 (5–3)	The Pit (18,100); Albuquerque, New Mexico
Feb 4, 1989		New Mexico	W 73–60	17–4 (6–3)	Special Events Center (12,222); El Paso, Texas
Feb 9, 1989		Air Force	W 67–62	18–4 (7–3)	Special Events Center (12,222); El Paso, Texas
Feb 11, 1989		Wyoming	W 79–72	19–4 (8–3)	Special Events Center (12,222); El Paso, Texas
Feb 16, 1989		at BYU	L 76–84	19–5 (8–4)	Marriott Center (16,136); Provo, Utah
Feb 18, 1989		at Utah	W 81–68	20–5 (9–4)	Jon M. Huntsman Center (10,669); Salt Lake City, Utah
Feb 23, 1989		at Colorado State	L 68–81	20–6 (9–5)	Moby Arena (9,314); Colorado Springs, Colorado
Mar 2, 1989		Hawaii	W 65–62	21–6 (10–5)	Special Events Center (12,222); El Paso, Texas
Mar 4, 1989		San Diego State	W 93–69	22–6 (11–5)	Special Events Center (12,222); El Paso, Texas
WAC tournament
Mar 8, 1989*	(2)	vs. (7) Wyoming; Quarterfinals	W 88–81 ^{2OT}	23–6	Jon M. Huntsman Center; Salt Lake City, Utah
Mar 9, 1989*	(2)	vs. (3) New Mexico; Semifinals	W 89–57	24–6	Jon M. Huntsman Center; Salt Lake City, Utah
Mar 11, 1989*	(2)	vs. (1) Colorado State; Championship	W 73–60	25–6	Jon M. Huntsman Center; Salt Lake City, Utah
NCAA tournament
Mar 17, 1989*	(7 W)	vs. (10 W) LSU; First Round	W 85–74	26–6	McKale Center; Tucson, Arizona
Mar 19, 1989*	(7 W)	vs. (2 W) No. 8 Indiana; Second Round	L 69–92	26–7	McKale Center; Tucson, Arizona
*Non-conference game. ^{#}Rankings from AP Poll. (#) Tournament seedings in parentheses. W=West.

== Awards and honors ==
- Tim Hardaway – WAC Player of the Year, Honorable Mention AP All-American

== NBA draft ==
Round	Pick	Player	NBA Club
1	14	Tim Hardaway	Golden State Warriors
