= George Banks (basketball) =

American basketball player (born 1972)

Personal information
- Born: October 9, 1972 (age 54) Rillito, Arizona, U.S.
- Listed height: 6 ft 9 in (2.06 m)
- Listed weight: 210 lb (95 kg)

Career information
- High school: Marana (Marana, Arizona)
- College: Central Arizona (1991–1993); UTEP (1993–1995)
- NBA draft: 1995: 2nd round, 46th overall pick
- Drafted by: Miami Heat
- Playing career: 1995–2010
- Position: Forward

Career history

Playing
- 1995: Shreveport Storm
- 1995–1996: Rockford Lightning
- 1996–1997: Dinamo Basket Sassari
- 1997: Perth Wildcats
- 1998: Cocodrilos de Caracas
- 1998–1999: Ironi Ramat Gan
- 1999–2000: Dinamo Basket Sassari
- 2000: New Mexico Slam
- 2001–2002: Canberra Cannons
- 2002: Shell Turbo Chargers
- 2002–2003: Elma APOEL
- 2003–2004: Keravnos
- 2004–2005: Banvit B.K.
- 2005–2006: Keravnos
- 2006–2007: Albacomp
- 2008–2009: Lami-Véd Körmend
- 2009–2010: Albacomp

Coaching
- 2010–2011: Webb School (assistant)
- 2011–2013: Chino HS
- 2013–2015: Chino Hills HS (assistant)
- 2015–2016: Colony HS (girls')

Career highlights
- All-NBL Third Team (2002); First-team All-WAC (1995)
- Stats at Basketball Reference

George Banks (born October 9, 1972) is an American former professional basketball player who was selected in the 1995 NBA draft by the Miami Heat.
