= 2003–04 Nevada Wolf Pack men's basketball team =

American college basketball season

2003–04 Nevada Wolf Pack men's basketball

WAC Regular season champion WAC tournament champion

NCAA tournament, Sweet Sixteen
- Conference: Western Athletic Conference

Ranking
- Coaches: No. 21
- Record: 25–9 (13–5 WAC)
- Head coach: Trent Johnson (5th season)
- Assistant coach: Mark Fox (4th season)
- Home arena: Lawlor Events Center

2003–04 WAC men's basketball standings
| | Conf. | | | | Overall |
| Team | W | | L | PCT | W | | L | PCT |
|---|---|---|---|---|---|---|---|---|
| Nevada † | 13 | – | 5 | .722 | 25 | – | 9 | .735 |
| UTEP | 13 | – | 5 | .722 | 24 | – | 8 | .750 |
| Boise State | 12 | – | 6 | .667 | 23 | – | 10 | .697 |
| Rice | 12 | – | 6 | .667 | 22 | – | 11 | .667 |
| Hawaii | 11 | – | 7 | .611 | 21 | – | 12 | .636 |
| Fresno State | 10 | – | 8 | .556 | 14 | – | 15 | .483 |
| Louisiana Tech | 8 | – | 10 | .444 | 15 | – | 15 | .500 |
| SMU | 5 | – | 13 | .278 | 12 | – | 18 | .400 |
| Tulsa | 5 | – | 13 | .278 | 9 | – | 20 | .310 |
| San Jose State | 1 | – | 17 | .056 | 6 | – | 23 | .207 |
† 2004 WAC tournament winner

The 2003–04 Nevada Wolf Pack men's basketball team represented the University of Nevada, Reno during the 2003–04 NCAA Division I men's basketball season. The Wolf Pack, led by fifth-year head coach Trent Johnson, played their home games at the Lawlor Events Center on their campus in Reno, Nevada as members of the Western Athletic Conference (WAC).

After finishing atop the conference regular season standings, Nevada won the WAC tournament to receive an automatic bid to the NCAA tournament as No. 10 seed in the St. Louis Region. The Wolf Pack defeated Michigan State and No. 2 seed Gonzaga to reach the first Sweet Sixteen in program history. In the Regional semifinal, No. 3 seed and eventual national runner-up Georgia Tech ended Nevada's run, 72–67. The team finished with a record of 25–9 (13–5 WAC).

== Roster ==
2003–04 Nevada Wolf Pack men's basketball team
Players
Coaches

| Pos. | # | Name | Height | Weight | Year | Previous school | Hometown |
|---|---|---|---|---|---|---|---|
| G | 1 | Kirk Snyder | 6 ft 6 in (1.98 m) | 225 lb (102 kg) | Jr | Upland | Upland, CA |
| G | 3 | Todd Okeson | 6 ft 0 in (1.83 m) | 165 lb (75 kg) | Sr | Weskan, KS |
| F | 21 | Kevinn Pinkney | 6 ft 10 in (2.08 m) | 245 lb (111 kg) | Jr | Colton | Colton, CA |
| F | 22 | Nick Fazekas | 6 ft 11 in (2.11 m) | 235 lb (107 kg) | Fr | Ralston Valley | Arvada, CO |
| G | 23 | Garry Hill-Thomas | 6 ft 4 in (1.93 m) | 200 lb (91 kg) | Sr | Oakland, CA |

Head coach

- Trent Johnson (Boise State)

Assistant coach(es)

Legend

- (C) Team captain
- (S) Suspended
- (I) Ineligible
- (W) Walk-on
- Injured
- Current redshirt

Roster

== Schedule and results ==
| Date time, TV | Rank^{#} | Opponent^{#} | Result | Record | Site city, state |
Regular season
| Nov 17, 2003* | | Vermont; Preseason NIT | W 69–49 | 1–0 | Lawlor Events Center; Reno, Nevada |
| Nov 19, 2003* | | at No. 1 Connecticut; Preseason NIT | L 79–93 | 1–1 | Harry A. Gampel Pavilion; Storrs, Connecticut |
| Nov 24, 2003* | | at UNLV | W 74–62 | 2–1 | Thomas & Mack Center; Las Vegas, Nevada |
| Dec 4, 2003* | | at Portland | L 70–86 | 2–2 | Chiles Center; Portland, Oregon |
| Dec 6, 2003* | | at Pacific | L 76–82 | 2–3 | Alex G. Spanos Center; Stockton, California |
| Dec 13, 2003* | | Weber State | W 74–62 | 3–3 | Lawlor Events Center; Reno, Nevada |
| Dec 20, 2003* | | Alabama State; Wolf Pack Holiday Classic | W 70–43 | 4–3 | Lawlor Events Center; Reno, Nevada |
| Dec 21, 2003* | | No. 6 Kansas; Wolf Pack Holiday Classic | W 75–61 | 5–3 | Lawlor Events Center; Reno, Nevada |
| Dec 27, 2003 | | UC Davis | W 84–62 | 6–3 | Lawlor Events Center; Reno, Nevada |
| Jan 3, 2004 | | at San Jose State | W 74–45 | 7–3 (1–0) | The Event Center; San Jose, California |
| Jan 5, 2004 | | at Hawaii | L 53–60 | 7–4 (1–1) | Stan Sheriff Center; Honolulu, Hawaii |
| Jan 8, 2004 | | Louisiana Tech | W 71–67 | 8–4 (2–1) | Lawlor Events Center; Reno, Nevada |
| Jan 10, 2004 | | SMU | W 84–74 | 9–4 (3–1) | Lawlor Events Center; Reno, Nevada |
| Jan 15, 2004 | | at UTEP | L 76–79 | 9–5 (3–2) | Don Haskins Center; El Paso, Texas |
| Jan 17, 2004 | | at Boise State | L 75–79 | 9–6 (3–3) | BSU Pavilion; Boise, Idaho |
| Jan 22, 2004 | | Tulsa | W 80–71 | 10–6 (4–3) | Lawlor Events Center; Reno, Nevada |
| Jan 24, 2004 | | Rice | W 101–76 | 11–6 (5–3) | Lawlor Events Center; Reno, Nevada |
| Jan 31, 2004 | | Fresno State | W 84–65 | 12–6 (6–3) | Lawlor Events Center; Reno, Nevada |
| Feb 2, 2004 | | at Tulsa | W 89–67 | 13–6 (7–3) | Donald W. Reynolds Center; Tulsa, Oklahoma |
| Feb 5, 2004 | | at SMU | L 70–71 ^{OT} | 13–7 (7–4) | Moody Coliseum; Dallas, Texas |
| Feb 7, 2004 | | at Louisiana Tech | W 79–64 | 14–7 (8–4) | Thomas Assembly Center; Ruston, Louisiana |
| Feb 12, 2004 | | Boise State | W 92–78 | 15–7 (9–4) | Lawlor Events Center; Reno, Nevada |
| Feb 14, 2004 | | UTEP | W 92–63 | 16–7 (10–4) | Lawlor Events Center; Reno, Nevada |
| Feb 18, 2004 | | at Rice | L 75–87 | 16–8 (10–5) | Tudor Fieldhouse; Houston, Texas |
| Feb 21, 2004* | | Toledo | W 60–58 | 17–8 | Lawlor Events Center; Reno, Nevada |
| Feb 28, 2004 | | at Fresno State | W 64–55 | 18–8 (11–5) | Save Mart Center; Fresno, California |
| Mar 4, 2004 | | Hawaii | W 77–64 | 19–8 (12–5) | Lawlor Events Center; Reno, Nevada |
| Mar 6, 2004 | | San Jose State | W 74–45 | 20–8 (13–5) | Lawlor Events Center; Reno, Nevada |
WAC tournament
| Mar 11, 2004* | | vs. SMU; Quarterfinals | W 75–60 | 21–8 | Save Mart Center; Fresno, California |
| Mar 12, 2004* | | vs. Rice; Semifinals | W 67–59 | 22–8 | Save Mart Center; Fresno, California |
| Mar 13, 2004* | | vs. UTEP; Championship Game | W 66–60 | 23–8 | Save Mart Center; Fresno, California |
NCAA tournament
| Mar 18, 2004* | (10) | vs. (7) Michigan State; First Round | W 72–66 | 24–8 | KeyArena; Seattle, Washington |
| Mar 20, 2004* | (10) | vs. (2) No. 3 Gonzaga; Second Round | W 91–72 | 25–8 | KeyArena; Seattle, Washington |
| Mar 26, 2004* | (10) | vs. (3) No. 14 Georgia Tech; Sweet Sixteen | L 67–72 | 25–9 | Edward Jones Dome; St. Louis, Missouri |
*Non-conference game. (#) Tournament seedings in parentheses. STL=St. Louis. All times are in Pacific Time.
