= Inside Hoops =

- Owner: InsideHoops Media Inc.
- Founder: Jeff Lenchiner
- Website: www.insidehoops.com
- Launched: 1999; 27 years ago

InsideHoops.com, or Inside Hoops, is a basketball news website that was founded in 1999 by Jeff Lenchiner. The site, which updates several times a day, primarily delivers NBA basketball coverage. The site also features basic daily college basketball coverage, WNBA news roundups, and coverage of top high school and street basketball events in the United States, as well as minor league and international hoops.

== Staff ==
A professional media outlet with press credential access to every level of basketball, Inside Hoops' staff is small and only consists of respected professional sports journalists. Editorial contributors to the website number in the hundreds. Former writers for InsideHoops.com went on to have jobs at New York Newsday, SportsTicker, Deadspin, CSTV, ESPN radio and other well-known outlets. Other writers went on to contribute to the New York Daily News, Slam Magazine and the Orlando Sentinel.

== Interviews ==
InsideHoops.com has over the years published interviews with several NBA stars, including LeBron James, Tim Duncan, Steve Nash, Vince Carter, Jason Kidd, Paul Pierce, Chris Paul, Dwight Howard, Kevin Garnett, Yao Ming, Chris Webber, Elton Brand, Tracy McGrady, Shawn Marion, Ron Artest, Jermaine O'Neal, Pat Riley, and Kareem Abdul-Jabbar.

Many players recorded audio welcomes for the website, which were found on the lower right corner of the front page. NBA Commissioner David Stern even recorded a greeting, welcoming readers to Inside Hoops.

== Media coverage ==
InsideHoops.com was called "a haven for pro basketball junkies" by Sports Illustrated in their December 25, 2000 issue. The InsideHoops.com NBA Rumors page was praised by Yahoo Internet Life back in 2001. Newsweek magazine recommended InsideHoops.com in March 2005, citing its "clever analysis." In April 2005, it was listed on Forbes weekly "Best of the Web".

InsideHoops.com and the NBA basketball analysis of Jeff Lenchiner have been quoted as a source by leading sports journalists and major newspapers, magazines and radio shows. The website has been referenced in basketball articles by the New York Times, New York Post, Boston Globe, Philadelphia Daily News, Seattle Post-Intelligencer, Chicago Tribune, Chicago Sun-Times, Los Angeles Times, Associated Press, SportsTicker, NBA.com, CNNSI.com, ESPN Insider, Kansas City Star, Indianapolis Star, Boston Globe, Philadelphia Daily News, Jerusalem Post and dozens of other major newspapers and magazines.

== Internet forum ==
The Inside Hoops message boards have over 100,000 members and features an NBA forum with thousands of posts a day . They have personal forums for all NBA teams, as well as forums for college basketball, high school basketball, the NBA draft, streetball, international basketball, video games, the NFL and sneakers.
