= WBL All-Star Game =

World Basketball League All-Star Game
- Status: Inactive
- Frequency: Annually
- Inaugurated: 1988
- Most recent: 1991
- Organizer: World Basketball League

The WBL All-Star Game was an annual basketball event in the United States, organised by the World Basketball League. It was launched in 1988 and lasted until 1991. The event was held annually and consisted of an all-star game, a three-point shoot contest and slam-dunk exhibition.

Many former NBA players including Mario Elie, Vincent Askew, Fred Cofield, and Craig Neal played in the All-Star Game. The event was televised by the SportsChannel.

== History ==
The first edition took place at the Olympic Saddledome of Calgary in Canada on July 7, 1988, in front of 7,000 spectators. The second edition was held in Las Vegas in front of 10.550 fans on July 12, 1989. The event was held in Halifax, Nova Scotia in 1991 for its fourth and final edition.

== List of games ==
Bold: Team that won the game.

Year	Date	Location	Team 1	Score	Team 2	MVP	Club
1988	July 7	Calgary	**West**	**131**-120	East	(United States) Jose Slaughter	(Canada) Vancouver Nighthawks
1989	July 17	Las Vegas	Las Vegas Silver Streaks	144-**148**	**WBL All-Stars**	(United States) Darryl Kennedy	(United States) Las Vegas Silver Streaks
1990	July 1	Youngstown	**West**	**150**-123	East	(United States) Vincent Askew	(United States) Memphis Rockers
1991	July 10	Halifax	**South**	**130**-120	North	(United States) Craig Neal	(United States) Florida Jades

== Events ==
=== Three-Point Shoot Contest ===
Year	Player	Team
1988	(United States) Chip Engelland	(Canada) Calgary 88's
1989	(United States) Chip Engelland (2)	(Canada) Calgary 88's
1990	(United States) Fred Cofield	(United States) Youngstown Pride
1991	(United States) Fred Cofield (2)	(United States) Youngstown Pride

=== Slam-Dunk champions ===
Year	Player	Team
1988	(United States) Jeff Collins	(United States) Las Vegas Silver Streaks
1989	(United States) Willie Bland (United States) Tim Legler (Note: In the 1989 the competition were between duos.)	(United States) Youngstown Pride (United States) Youngstown Pride
1990	(United States) Mario Donaldson	(Canada) Saskatchewan Storm
1991	(United States) Milt Newton	(Canada) Halifax Windjammers

== Topscorers ==
Year	Player	Points	Team
1998	(Croatia) Zoran Kalpic	28	

== Notable participants ==
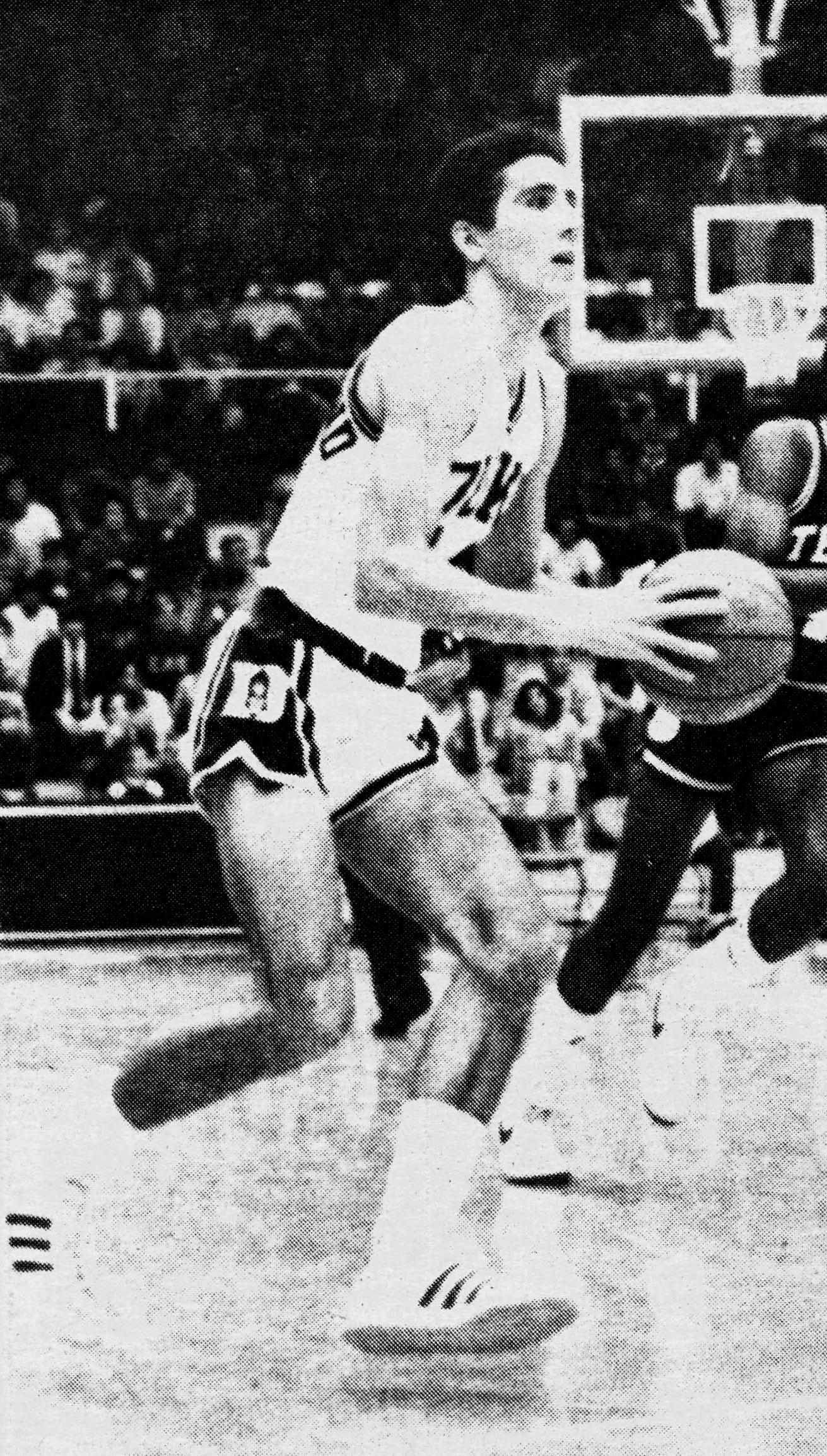
Former NBA player Chip Engelland was the 3-point contest winner twice.

- (United States) Tim Legler
- (United States) Mario Elie
- (United States) Chip Engelland
- (United States) Fred Cofield
- (United States) Vincent Askew

== WBL All-Stars ==
The league also had an team of All-Stars. At Christmas of 1989 the All-Stars represented the league in an international tournament hosted by Sunair Oostende in Belgium. In July 1990 the All-Stars toured Italy and recorded 5 wins out of 6 games against professional clubs from six Italian cities. Overall in 1990, the All-Star team won tournaments in Holland, the Soviet Union, Finland, France while they were finalists in events in Yugoslavia, Italy and in a European championship. By November 1991, the WBL teams had won around 90 percent of their international matches.

In November 1991, the All-Stars participated in the sixth Merlion Cup in Singapore in a weeklong tournament (against Kiev Stroitel and BC Spartak Leningrad, the Chinese national team, a Canadian all-star team, and teams from Australia, Hong Kong and Singapore) reaching the semifinals.

== See also ==
- World Basketball League
