= World Basketball League =

Basketball league in the US and Canada

- Sport: Basketball
- Founded: November 1987
- Founder: Mickey Monus
- First season: 1988
- Folded: August 1, 1992
- Countries: United States; Canada
- Last champion: Dayton Wings (1992)
- Most titles: Youngstown Pride and Dayton Wings (2 Titles)

World Basketball League (WBL) was a minor professional basketball league in the United States and Canada which operated from 1988 to 1992. It was founded as the International Basketball Association in November 1987, before changing its name prior to the 1988 season. One of the major differences between it and other leagues was that it had a height restriction. Players over 6 ft 5 in (1.95 m) were not allowed to play; this restriction was raised to 6 ft 7 in (2.0 m) in 1991.

== History ==
The league was founded in November 1987. Basketball Hall-of-Famer and Boston Celtic great Bob Cousy (6'1" tall) was one of the league's founders. Norm Drucker, a 25-year veteran referee with the National Basketball Association and American Basketball Association, and a former supervisor of officials for the NBA, served as the WBL's supervisor of officiating. One of the league's founders, Michael Monus, was eventually convicted of having embezzled $10 million to finance the league, from a privately owned company he had founded, Phar-Mor. He was sentenced to nine (9) years in federal prison. The league was run from April to August each year.

In July 1988, the annual WBL All-Star Game was launched. In addition to games against other teams in the league, games were also played against international teams. The league had several of its games broadcast on television. In Canada, the games were broadcast on the CanWest Global System. In the United States, the games were broadcast on SportsChannel America. Mike Rice was the primary analyst for the SportsChannel broadcasts.

After the league folded in 1992, the surviving Canadian-based teams formed the National Basketball League. This league played two seasons before it folded as well.

== Teams ==
Team	City	Arena	Seasons	Notes
Calgary 88's	Calgary, Alberta	Olympic Saddledome	1988–1992	
Chicago Express	Chicago, Illinois	Rosemont Horizon	1988	Moved to Springfield, Illinois following the 1988 season.
Dayton Wings	Dayton, Ohio	Ervin J. Nutter Center	1991–1992	Team folded July 31, 1992.
Erie Wave	Erie, Pennsylvania	Louis J. Tullio Center	1990–1992	Team folded July 20, 1992.
Florida Jades	Boca Raton, Florida	Florida Atlantic University Arena	1991–1992	Team folded June 15, 1992.
Fresno Flames	Fresno, California	Selland Arena	1988	
Halifax Windjammers	Halifax, Nova Scotia	Halifax Metro Centre	1991–1992	Joined the National Basketball League for 1993.
Hamilton Skyhawks	Hamilton, Ontario	Copps Coliseum	1992	Joined the National Basketball League for 1993.
Illinois Express	Springfield, Illinois	Prairie Capital Convention Center	1989–1990	
Jacksonville Stingrays	Jacksonville, Florida	Jacksonville Coliseum	1992	Team folded June 15, 1992.
Las Vegas Silver Streaks	Las Vegas, Nevada	Thomas & Mack Center	1988–1990	Moved to Nashville following 1990 season.
Memphis Rockers	Memphis, Tennessee	Mid-South Coliseum	1990–1991	
Nashville Stars	Nashville, Tennessee	Nashville Municipal Auditorium	1991	
Saskatchewan Storm	Saskatoon, Saskatchewan	Saskatchewan Place	1990–1992	Joined the National Basketball League in 1993. Franchise name changed by ownership to the "Saskatoon Slam."
Vancouver Nighthawks	Vancouver, British Columbia	BC Place	1988	
Winnipeg Thunder	Winnipeg, Manitoba	Winnipeg Arena	1992	Joined the National Basketball League for 1993.
Worcester Counts	Worcester, Massachusetts	Worcester Centrum	1989	
Youngstown Pride	Youngstown, Ohio	Beeghly Center	1988–1992	

=== International Teams ===
Team	City	Seasons	Notes
Abruzzo All-Stars	Abruzzo, Italy	1992	
Bahamas Nationals	The Bahamas	1992	
Estonian Nationals	Estonia	1992	
	Finland	1989–1991	
	Greece	1989–1991	
Holland	Netherlands	1989–1991	
	Italy	1989–1991	
Kyiv All-Stars	Kyiv, Ukraine	1992	
	Norway	1989–1991	
Soviet Union	USSR	1989–1991	

== Champions of WBL ==
Season	Winning team	Losing team	Series/score
1988	Las Vegas Silver Streaks	Chicago Express	102–95
1989	Youngstown Pride	Calgary 88's	2–0
1990	Youngstown Pride	Calgary 88's	3–2
1991	Dayton Wings	Calgary 88's	3–0
1992	Dayton Wings	N/A	Dayton Wings were declared leaders of the regular season (due to league folding August 1)

== Personnel ==
League President

- Dr. John Geletka 1991–1992

League Commissioner

- Steve Ehrhart 1988–1992

== Awards ==
=== WBL Championship MVP ===
Season	Player	Team
1988	Jamie Waller	Las Vegas Silver Streaks
1989	Barry Mitchell	Youngstown Pride
1990	Barry Mitchell	Youngstown Pride
1991	Perry McDonald	Dayton Wings

=== Player of the Year ===
This award was established in 1991.

Season	Player	Team
1991	Tracy Moore	Florida Jades

=== Rookie of the Year ===
This award was established in 1991.

Season	Player	Team
1991	J. J. Eubanks	Nashville Stars

=== Sixth Man of the Year ===
Season	Player	Team
1988	Chip Engelland	Calgary 88's
1989	Keith Smart	Worcester Counts
1990	Troy Lewis	Youngstown Pride
1991	Kelsey Weems	Calgary 88's

=== Coach of the Year ===
Season	Coach	Team	GP	W	L	Pct.
1988	Mike Thibault	Calgary 88's				
1989	Bob Patton	Youngstown Pride				
1990	Sonny Allen	Las Vegas Silver Streaks				
1991	Pat Haley	Dayton Wings				

== Statistical leaders ==
Year	Points	Rebounds	Assists	Steals	Blocks
1988	Jamie Waller, 26.7	David Boone, 9.8	Mark Wade, 12.8	Mark Wade, 1.8	Andre Patterson, 2.2
1989	Jamie Waller, 21.7	Alfredrick Hughes, 11.5	Cedric Hunter, 11.0	Darryl Johnson, 1.9	Perry Young, 1.3
1990	Jamie Waller, 26.5	Vincent Askew, 9.8	Mark Wade, 11.5	Andre Turner, 2.4	John Hegwood, 1.3
1991	Jamie Waller, 26.3	Willie Bland, 12.3	Mark Wade, 8.7	Darryl McDonald, 2.5	Willie Glass, 1.7

== Notable players ==
=== NBA players ===
These players played at least 1 game in the NBA

- Vincent Askew
- Dudley Bradley
- Scott Brooks
- Carlos Clark
- Fred Cofield
- Mario Elie
- David Henderson
- Alfredrick Hughes
- Cedric Hunter
- Darryl Johnson
- Anthony Jones
- Doug Lee
- Tim Legler
- Jim Les
- Sidney Lowe
- Kenny Natt
- Craig Neal
- Jose Slaughter
- Keith Smart
- John Starks
- Jim Thomas
- Andre Turner
- Mark Wade
- Milt Wagner
- Jamie Waller
- Perry Young

=== Other leagues ===
These players have won at least 1 individual award while playing in professional leagues

- Joe Dawson
- Aivar Kuusmaa
- Darryl McDonald
- Igors Miglinieks
- Barry Mitchell
- Clyde Vaughan

=== International players ===
- Keith Smart, USA National team (1987) - 7 appearances
- James Blackwell, USA National team (1999) - 5 appearances
- James Martin, USA National team (1999) - 4 appearances
- A.J. Wynder, USA National team (1995) - 6 appearances
- Jim Thomas, USA National team (1982) - 6 appearances
- Kelsey Weems, USA National team (1993–95)
- Aivar Kuusmaa, USSR and Estonia National team (1989–2001)

== See also ==
- World Basketball League All-Star Game
