= Omaha Racers =

- Leagues: CBA
- Founded: 1982
- Folded: 1997
- History: Wisconsin Flyers; 1982–87; Rochester Flyers; 1987–89; Omaha Racers; 1989–97
- Location: Omaha, Nebraska
- Team colors: navy, magenta, white
- Championships: 1 (1993)

The Omaha Racers were an American minor league basketball team based in Omaha, Nebraska. The franchise played in the Continental Basketball Association (CBA) from 1989 to 1997. The team's franchise linage started in 1982 as the Wisconsin Flyers. The franchise spent two seasons in Rochester, Minnesota before relocating to Omaha in 1989 to become the Racers. The team's home venue was Ak-Sar-Ben Arena. Throughout the entire history of the Racers, Mike Thibault served as the team's head coach and led Omaha to appearances in two CBA Finals. The team was victorious over the Grand Rapids Hoops during the 1993 CBA Finals.

== Franchise history ==
=== Rochester Flyers (1987–89) ===
The Rochester Flyers would finish 20-34 (fifth place in the Western Division) in the 1987–88 season, failing to qualify for the CBA playoffs. In 1988–89 the Flyers finished last in the West with a 16–38 record. Despite averaging approximately 2,600 fans per home game, the team moved to Omaha, Nebraska after the season.

=== Omaha Racers (1989–1997) ===
The first logo of the Omaha Racers used from 1989 to 1993.

Before the start of the Racers' inaugural season, the CBA ruled that the team's ownership was not financially solvent and the franchise would need to be put up for sale. Terren Peizer purchased the team on September 15, 1989, and announced he would keep the team in Omaha. Team president and general manager Mike Cole told Ray Waddell of Amusement Business, "We're very happy with how it has worked out ... We pulled off something many people said we couldn't do." Under head coach Mike Thibault, the Racers went 29–27 in 1989–90 and made the CBA playoffs in the National Conference, where they lost to the San Jose Jammers in the first round. Peizer sold the team in 1990.

On February 4, 1990, Racers player Roland Gray set a franchise record for points scored in a game with 45 in a game against the San Jose Jammers. The 1990–91 Racers had the best record in franchise history (39–17), but lost to the Quad City Thunder in the American Conference finals. Tim Legler was named the team's most valuable player following the season.

Moving back to the National Conference in 1991–92, Omaha finished second in the Northern Division (37–19) to the Rapid City Thrillers. After defeating the Oklahoma City Cavalry in the second round of the playoffs, the Racers lost to the Thrillers in the conference finals, 3 games to 2.

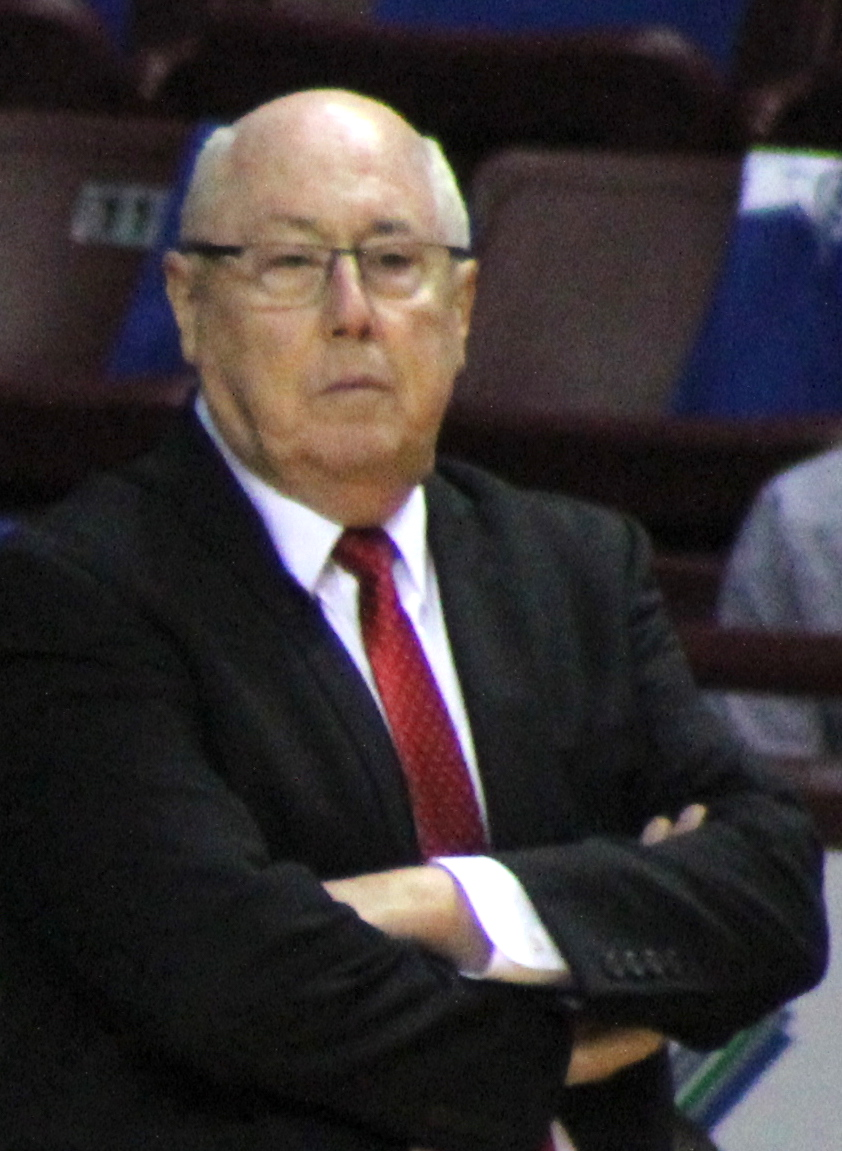
Mike Thibault served as the Omaha Racers head coach for their entire eight-year history.

The 1992–93 Racers made it to the top, after finishing second in the Northern Division (28-28) again to Rapid City. Omaha beat the Wichita Falls Texans in the first round, then slipped past Rapid City in a five-game conference final. In the CBA championship, Omaha defeated the Grand Rapids Hoops in six games. A 106–98 win on May 1, 1993, in Grand Rapids was the high-water mark of the franchise. In spite of their success, attendance dropped during the 1992–93 season, which led team officials to announce that if they failed to sell 3,500 season tickets before the start of the next season the Racers would relocate. Omaha averaged 3,062 attendees per game during the 1992–93 season, which was down from 3,875 per game the season before.

Rapid City finished ahead of Omaha (30–26) in the Northern Division for the third straight year in 1993–94. Omaha made it back to the CBA finals, after defeating the Tri-City Chinook in round one and Rapid City in the conference finals. The Quad City Thunder defeated Omaha in five games to win the league title.

Omaha (26–30) moved to the Southern Division in 1994–95 and finished second to Oklahoma City. They beat the Sioux Falls SkyForce in the first round, but fell to Oklahoma City in the second round. Thibault missed seven games as head coach, being replaced by Eric Chapman, as he coached the US in the 1995 Pan American Games in Argentina.

Omaha (28-28) moved back to the Northern Division of the National Conference in 1995–96, and finished second again, this time to Sioux Falls. The Florida Beachdogs swept the Racers out of the playoffs in round one.

With the CBA shrinking to 11 teams in 1996–97, Omaha was placed in the 5-team National Conference and finished in fourth place (22–34). In one of the biggest upsets in CBA playoff history, the Racers defeated Sioux Falls (47–9) in five games, winning the clincher in South Dakota, 98–92. Oklahoma City brought them back down to earth, winning the conference finals, 3 games to 1. During their final season, Kevin Kugler served as the Racers play-by-play announcer.

With a record of 375–413, plus a 42–49 mark in the playoffs, and one CBA title (1992–93), the Wisconsin/Rochester/Omaha Racers franchise was declared inactive in the summer of 1997. At the time, there was some faint hope that the franchise may start up again in 1998–99. The two teams who had made the CBA finals in 1997, Oklahoma City and Florida, also folded.

In 2013, on the 20^{th} anniversary of Omaha's 1993 CBA Championship win, 30 former Racers players, staff and executives gathered for a reunion event at Ralston Arena.

== Season-by-season standings ==
Season	W	L	QW	SPts.	Division	Place	CBA Playoffs	Head coach
Wisconsin Flyers (Oshkosh, Wisconsin)
1982–83	14	30	78.0	120.0	Central Division	3^{rd}	—	Dave Harshman
1983–84	27	17	101.0	182.0	Western Division	1^{st}	First round: Defeated Ohio Mixers 3–2	Bill Klucas
1983–84	27	17	101.0	182.0	Western Division	1^{st}	Second round: Lost to Wyoming Wildcatters 3–1	Bill Klucas
1984–85	21	27	91.0	154.0	Western Division	4^{th}	First round: Defeated Wyoming Wildcatters 3–2	Bill Klucas
1984–85	21	27	91.0	154.0	Western Division	4^{th}	Second round: Lost to Detroit Spirits 3–0	Bill Klucas
1985–86	16	32	79.5	127.5	Western Division	7^{th}	—	Joe Merten
1986–87	22	26	87.5	153.5	Western Division	6^{th}	—	Bill Klucas
Rochester Flyers (Rochester, Minnesota)
1987–88	20	34	104.5	164.5	Western Division	5^{th}	—	Bill Klucas (16–32)
1987–88	20	34	104.5	164.5	Western Division	5^{th}	—	David Thirdkill (1–0)
1987–88	20	34	104.5	164.5	Western Division	5^{th}	—	Scott Carlin (3–2)
1988–89	16	38	88.0	136.0	Western Division	6^{th}	—	Scott Carlin
Omaha Racers (Omaha, Nebraska)
1989–90	29	27	118.0	205.0	Midwest Division	2^{nd}	—	Mike Thibault
1990–91	39	17	127.0	244.0	Midwest Division	1^{st}	First round: Defeated Rapid City Thrillers 3–2	Mike Thibault
1990–91	39	17	127.0	244.0	Midwest Division	1^{st}	Second round: Lost to Quad City Thunder 4–1	Mike Thibault
1991–92	37	19	127.0	238.0	Northern Division	2^{nd}	First round: Defeated Oklahoma City Cavalry 3–2	Mike Thibault
1991–92	37	19	127.0	238.0	Northern Division	2^{nd}	Second round: Lost to Rapid City Thrillers 3–2	Mike Thibault
1992–93	28	28	109.0	193.0	Midwest Division	2^{nd}	First round: Defeated Wichita Falls Texans 3–2	Mike Thibault
1992–93	28	28	109.0	193.0	Midwest Division	2^{nd}	Second round: Defeated Rapid City Thrillers 3–2	Mike Thibault
1992–93	28	28	109.0	193.0	Midwest Division	2^{nd}	CBA Finals: Defeated Grand Rapids Hoops 4–2	Mike Thibault
1993–94	30	26	113.5	203.5	Midwest Division	2^{nd}	First round: Defeated Tri-City Chinook 3–2	Mike Thibault
1993–94	30	26	113.5	203.5	Midwest Division	2^{nd}	Second round: Defeated Rapid City Thrillers 3–2	Mike Thibault
1993–94	30	26	113.5	203.5	Midwest Division	2^{nd}	CBA Finals: Lost to Quad City Thunder 4–1	Mike Thibault
1994–95	26	30	97.5	175.5	Southern Division	2^{nd}	First round: Defeated Sioux Falls Skyforce 2–1	Mike Thibault
1994–95	26	30	97.5	175.5	Southern Division	2^{nd}	Second round: Lost to Oklahoma City Cavalry 3–2	Mike Thibault
1995–96	28	28	106.5	190.5	Northern Division	2^{nd}	First round: Lost to Florida Beach Dogs 3–0	Mike Thibault
1996–97	22	34	97.5	163.5	National Conference	4^{th}	First round: Defeated Sioux Falls Skyforce 3–2	Mike Thibault
1996–97	22	34	97.5	163.5	National Conference	4^{th}	Second round: Lost to Oklahoma City Cavalry 3–1	Mike Thibault

== Awards and accolades ==
- 1993 CBA Champions
- 1993 & 1994 National Conference Champions
- 1990–91 All-CBA Team: Tim Legler
- 1990–91 All-CBA Defense Team: Willie Simmons
- 1990–91 All-CBA Rookie Team: Brian Howard
- 1992–93 All-CBA First Team: Tim Legler
- 1993 CBA Playoffs Most Valuable Player: Jim Thomas
- Corey Gaines led the CBA with 11.6 assists per game during the 1989–1990 season

== All-time roster ==
- Alaa Abdelnaby
- Jerry Adams
- Randy Allen
- Ted Allen
- Herb Baker
- Darien Baptiste
- Mike Bell
- Alex Blackwell
- Pat Bolden
- David Boone
- Dudley Bradley
- Willie Brand
- Torgeir Bryn
- Bruce Chubick
- Ben Coleman
- Jerome Coles
- Steve Colter
- Jeffty Connelly
- Duane Cooper
- Steve Criss
- Deryl Cunningham
- Michael Curry
- Robyn Davis
- Mario Donaldson
- Kenny Drummond
- Chip Engelland
- Wayne Engelstad
- Michael Evans
- Matt Fish
- Kevin Franklin
- Corey Gaines
- Chad Gallagher
- Sean Gay
- Barry Glanzer
- Paul Graham
- Ronnie Grandison
- Roland Gray
- Geert Hammink
- Darrin Hancock
- Phil Handy
- Holman Harley
- Quinn Harwood
- Mike Higgins
- Nate Higgs
- Johnnie Hilliard
- Anthony Houston
- Brian Howard
- Cedric Hunter
- William Hunter
- Dave Jamerson
- Darryl Johnson
- Jerry Johnson
- Sam Johnson
- Mike Jones
- Ricky Jones
- Bart Kofoed
- Tim Legler
- Jim Les
- Cedric Lewis
- Malcolm Mackey
- Brian Martin
- Erik Martin
- James Martin
- Warren Martin
- Rod Mason
- Clinton McDaniel
- Ron Moore
- Howard Nathan
- Craig Neal
- Sebastian Neal
- Dyron Nix
- Dan O'Sullivan
- Matt Othick
- Mark Peterson
- Tim Price
- Joe Rhett
- Keith Robinson
- Clifford Rozier
- John Strickland
- Melvin Robinson
- Ricky Robinson
- Willie Simmons
- Charles Smith
- Alex Stivrins
- John Strickland
- Joe Temple
- Jim Thomas
- Dean Thompson
- Kerwin Thompson
- Patrick Tompkins
- Tommy Tormohlen
- Kenny Travis
- Reginald Turner
- Mark Wade
- Paul Weakley
- Kelsey Weems
- Scott Wilke
- Greg Wiltjer
- Al Wood
- Steve Wright
- Kenny Young
- Rodney Zimmerman
- Gus Gonidakis
