= James Blackwell (basketball) =

American basketball player

Personal information
- Born: February 25, 1968 (age 58) Mount Kisco, New York, U.S.
- Listed height: 6 ft 0 in (1.83 m)
- Listed weight: 190 lb (86 kg)

Career information
- High school: Fox Lane (Bedford, New York); Deerfield Academy (Deerfield, Massachusetts)
- College: Dartmouth (1987–1991)
- NBA draft: 1991: undrafted
- Playing career: 1991–2002
- Position: Point guard
- Number: 7, 8

Career history
- 1991: Nashville Stars
- 1991–1992: Albany Sharp Shooters
- 1992: Youngstown Pride
- 1992: South Georgia Blues
- 1992–1993: Capital Region Pontiacs
- 1993–1994: Hartford Hellcats
- 1994: Oklahoma City Cavalry
- 1994: La Crosse Catbirds
- 1994: Charlotte Hornets
- 1994–1995: Pittsburgh Piranhas
- 1995: Boston Celtics
- 1995: Pittsburgh Piranhas
- 1995–1996: Gijón Baloncesto
- 1996–1997: Olympique Antibes
- 1997–1998: Cholet Basket
- 1998–1999: La Crosse Bobcats
- 1999: Dinamo Sassari
- 1999–2000: Beşiktaş
- 2000: Hapoel Jerusalem
- 2001: ALM Évreux
- 2001: Beşiktaş
- 2001–2002: Oyak Renault

Career highlights
- All-CBA Second Team (1994); 3× CBA All-Defensive Team (1994, 1995, 1999); CBA steals leader (1999)
- Stats at NBA.com
- Stats at Basketball Reference
Medals
Men's basketball
Representing United States
Pan American Games
Silver medal – second place	1999 Winnipeg	National team

Emmanuel James Blackwell (born February 25, 1968) is a retired American basketball player. Born in Mount Kisco, New York, he played collegiately for Dartmouth College.

Blackwell played for the Charlotte Hornets and Boston Celtics (1994–95) in the NBA for 13 games. He also played overseas in France, Spain (with Gijón Baloncesto), Italy, Israel and Turkey. Blackwell played in the Continental Basketball Association (CBA) for the Capital Region Pontiacs, Hartford Hellcats, Oklahoma City Cavalry, La Crosse Catbirds, Pittsburgh Piranhas and La Crosse Bobcats. He was named second team All-CBA in 1994 as a member of the Catbirds. Blackwell was a three-time selection to the CBA All-Defensive Team in 1994, 1995 and 1999.
