= Darryl Johnson (basketball) =

American basketball player

Personal information
- Born: October 26, 1965 (age 60) Flint, Michigan, U.S.
- Listed height: 6 ft 1 in (1.85 m)
- Listed weight: 170 lb (77 kg)

Career information
- High school: Central (Flint, Michigan)
- College: Michigan State (1983–1987)
- NBA draft: 1987: 3rd round, 58th overall pick
- Drafted by: Golden State Warriors
- Playing career: 1987–2003
- Position: Point guard

Career history
- 1987–1988: Chicago Rockers
- 1988: Chicago Express
- 1989: Illinois Express
- 1989–1990: Cedar Rapids Silver Bullets
- 1990–1991: Purefoods Hotdogs
- 1991: Youngstown Pride
- 1991: Dayton Wings
- 1991–1992: Music City Jammers
- 1992–1994: Rockford Lightning
- 1993: Canadian NBL
- 1994: Townsville Suns
- 1994–1996: Omaha Racers
- 1996: Cleveland Cavaliers
- 1996–1997: Napoli Basket
- 1997–1998: Valvi Girona
- 1998: Idaho Stampede
- 1998–1999: Instituto de Córdoba
- 1999–2001: Atlético San Isidro
- 2001–2002: Flint Fuze
- 2002–2003: Unión Deportiva Española Temuco

Career highlights
- All-CBA Second Team (1996); WBL champion (1991); Canadian NBL All-League Team (1993)
- Stats at NBA.com
- Stats at Basketball Reference

Darryl Damone Johnson (born October 26, 1965) is an American former professional basketball player. Born in Flint, Michigan, Johnson attended Michigan State University. He was selected with the 12th overall pick in the third round (58th overall) of the 1987 NBA draft by the Golden State Warriors, but never played for them. He spent most of the early part of his career playing in the Continental Basketball Association and the World Basketball League before ending his career playing in South America. Johnson also played 11 games for the Cleveland Cavaliers during the 1995–96 NBA season, averaging 1.1 points per game.

Johnson grew up playing at Jackson Park on the north side of Flint, Michigan. He later enjoyed a successful four-year run (1983–87) at Michigan State University, followed by a solid professional career in the CBA and overseas, as well as brief NBA stints with the Indiana Pacers (1990 training camp) and Cleveland Cavaliers.

Johnson played in the Continental Basketball Association (CBA) for the Cedar Rapids Silver Bullets, Rockford Lightning, Omaha Racers, Idaho Stampede and Flint Fuze from 1989 to 2002. He was selected to the All-CBA Second Team in 1996.
