= Jamie Waller (basketball) =

American basketball player (born 1964)

Personal information
- Born: November 20, 1964 (age 61) South Boston, Virginia, U.S.
- Listed height: 6 ft 4 in (1.93 m)
- Listed weight: 215 lb (98 kg)

Career information
- High school: Halifax County (South Boston, Virginia)
- College: Virginia Union (1983–1987)
- NBA draft: 1987: 3rd round, 48th overall pick
- Drafted by: New Jersey Nets
- Playing career: 1987–1992
- Position: Small forward
- Number: 25, 32

Career history
- 1987: New Jersey Nets
- 1987–1988: Quad City Thunder
- 1988: Charleston Gunners
- 1988: Ginebra San Miguel
- 1988–1989: Las Vegas Silver Streaks
- 1989–1990: Élan Béarnais Pau-Orthez
- 1990: Las Vegas Silver Streaks
- 1991: Nashville Stars
- 1991: Erie Wave
- 1992: Ginebra San Miguel

Career highlights
- CBA All-Star (1988); CBA Rookie of the Year (1988); CBA All-Rookie Team (1988); PBA Open Conference Best Import (1988); WBL Championship MVP (1988); WBL champion (1988); 3× First-team All-WBL (1988–1990)
- Stats at NBA.com
- Stats at Basketball Reference

Jamie Waller (born November 20, 1964) is an American former professional basketball player who played for the New Jersey Nets of the National Basketball Association (NBA). A 6'4" guard-forward, Waller played college basketball at the historically black Virginia Union University, an NCAA Division II institution at Richmond. Waller also played in the Continental Basketball Association (CBA), and won the league's 1988 Rookie of the Year Award.

== Career statistics ==
Legend
| GP | Games played | GS | Games started | MPG | Minutes per game |
| FG% | Field goal percentage | 3P% | 3-point field goal percentage | FT% | Free throw percentage |
| RPG | Rebounds per game | APG | Assists per game | SPG | Steals per game |
| BPG | Blocks per game | PPG | Points per game | **Bold** | Career high |

=== NBA ===
==== Regular season ====
| Year | Team | GP | GS | MPG | FG% | 3P% | FT% | RPG | APG | SPG | BPG | PPG |
|---|---|---|---|---|---|---|---|---|---|---|---|---|
| 1987–88 | New Jersey | 9 | 0 | 10.1 | .400 | .000 | .556 | 1.4 | .3 | .4 | .1 | 4.7 |
