= Jim Les =

American basketball player and coach

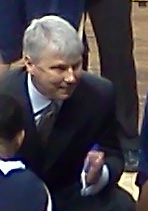
- Les in 2013 at the San Jose State Event Center

UC Davis Aggies
- Title: Head coach
- League: Mountain West

Personal information
- Born: August 18, 1963 (age 63) Niles, Illinois, U.S.
- Listed height: 5 ft 11 in (1.80 m)
- Listed weight: 195 lb (88 kg)

Career information
- High school: Notre Dame College Prep (Niles, Illinois)
- College: Cleveland State (1981–1982); Bradley (1983–1986)
- NBA draft: 1986: 3rd round, 70th overall pick
- Drafted by: Atlanta Hawks
- Playing career: 1987–1995
- Position: Point guard
- Number: 25, 12, 33, 14
- Coaching career: 1994–present

Career history

Playing
- 1987–1988: Rochester Flyers
- 1988: Chicago Express
- 1988–1989: Utah Jazz
- 1990: Santa Barbara Islanders
- 1990: Los Angeles Clippers
- 1990: Saskatchewan Storm
- 1990: Omaha Racers
- 1990–1994: Sacramento Kings
- 1994: Omaha Racers
- 1994–1995: Atlanta Hawks
- 1995: CB Salamanca

Coaching
- 1994: Omaha Racers (assistant)
- 1999–2001: Sacramento Monarchs (assistant)
- 2002–2011: Bradley
- 2011–present: UC Davis

Career highlights
- As player: All-WBL (1988); MVC Player of the Year (1986); Frances Pomeroy Naismith Award (1986); As coach: 2× Big West regular season champion (2015, 2018); Big West tournament champion (2017); 2× Big West Coach of the Year (2015, 2018)

Career statistics
- Points: 1,210 (3.8 ppg)
- Rebounds: 396 (1.2 rpg)
- Assists: 930 (2.9 apg)
- Stats at NBA.com
- Stats at Basketball Reference

James Alan Les (born August 18, 1963) is an American basketball coach and former player who is the head coach of the UC Davis Aggies men's team. A former point guard, Les played seven seasons in the National Basketball Association (NBA) after his college career at Bradley University.

In 2011, he was hired as the head coach of the UC Davis Aggies men's basketball team.

== College career ==
Les began his collegiate basketball career playing at Cleveland State University, but transferred after the 1981–82 season to Bradley. While attending Bradley University he was a member of the Accounting Student Association and the Delta Upsilon fraternity. When he left college in 1986, he had compiled the second most assists in NCAA history in a combined playing career with Cleveland State and Bradley.

== Professional career ==
A 5'11" point guard, Les was the 70th overall pick in the 1986 NBA draft, selected in the third round by the Atlanta Hawks. However, the Hawks waived Les in July 1986. Two months later, Les signed with the Philadelphia 76ers but was waived in December without playing a game. Les re-signed with the 76ers on July 1, 1987, but was waived on November 3 before the regular season.

Les later signed with the Rochester Flyers of the Continental Basketball Association (CBA) and played 12 games from 1987 to 1988. In the summer of 1988, Les signed with the Chicago Express of the World Basketball League (WBL). Les was a 1988 All-WBL selection and led the league in three-point field goal percentage in 1988 with 46.7%. The Chicago Express were runners-up in the WBL championship.

Les signed with the NBA's Milwaukee Bucks on October 19, 1988, but was waived the next day. He then signed with the Utah Jazz and made his NBA debut on November 4, 1988. Les played all 82 games of the 1988–89 season. Les averaged 9.5 minutes, 1.7 points, 1.1 rebounds, and 2.6 assists per game. After playing one game in the beginning of the 1989–90 season, Les was waived by the Jazz on November 6, 1989. Les then joined the Santa Barbara Islanders of the CBA and averaged 14.6 points and 9.8 assists a game. Les returned to the NBA on February 6, 1990, with the Los Angeles Clippers and was waived on February 27 after playing 6 games.

In the summer of 1990, Les signed with the WBL's Saskatchewan Storm. On July 16, Les scored 38 points and had 17 assists to rally the Storm to a 140–136 win over the Calgary 88s after trailing by 16 at halftime. Les made 6 of 7 three-point attempts.

Les signed with the NBA's Charlotte Hornets on August 29, 1990, but was waived before the regular season on October 23, 1990. On December 31, Les signed with the Sacramento Kings. Following two ten-day contracts, Les signed with the Kings for the rest of the season on January 20, 1991. With the Kings that season, Les reached career highs in scoring average (7.2 PPG), assists (5.4 APG), steals (1.04 SPG) and field goal percentage (.444), while also leading the league in three-point field goal percentage (.461). The following year, he was runner-up to Craig Hodges in the AT&T Long Distance Shootout contest. Les played over 200 games for the Kings over 4 seasons before the team waived him on January 9, 1994.

Les signed with the Omaha Racers (formerly the Rochester Flyers) of the CBA after leaving the Kings. With the Racers, Les was both a player and assistant coach. With 20.2 points per game, Les was the Racers' leading scorer in the playoffs, and the Racers advanced to the 1994 CBA Finals.

On August 9, 1994, Les signed with the NBA's Atlanta Hawks. In 24 games, Les averaged 2.1 points, 1.1 rebounds, and 1.8 assists. In October 1995, Les signed with CB Salamanca of the Spanish Liga ACB and was waived in December. Les averaged 13.4 points, 3.4 rebounds, and 4.7 assists in 7 games with Salamanca.

== Coaching career ==
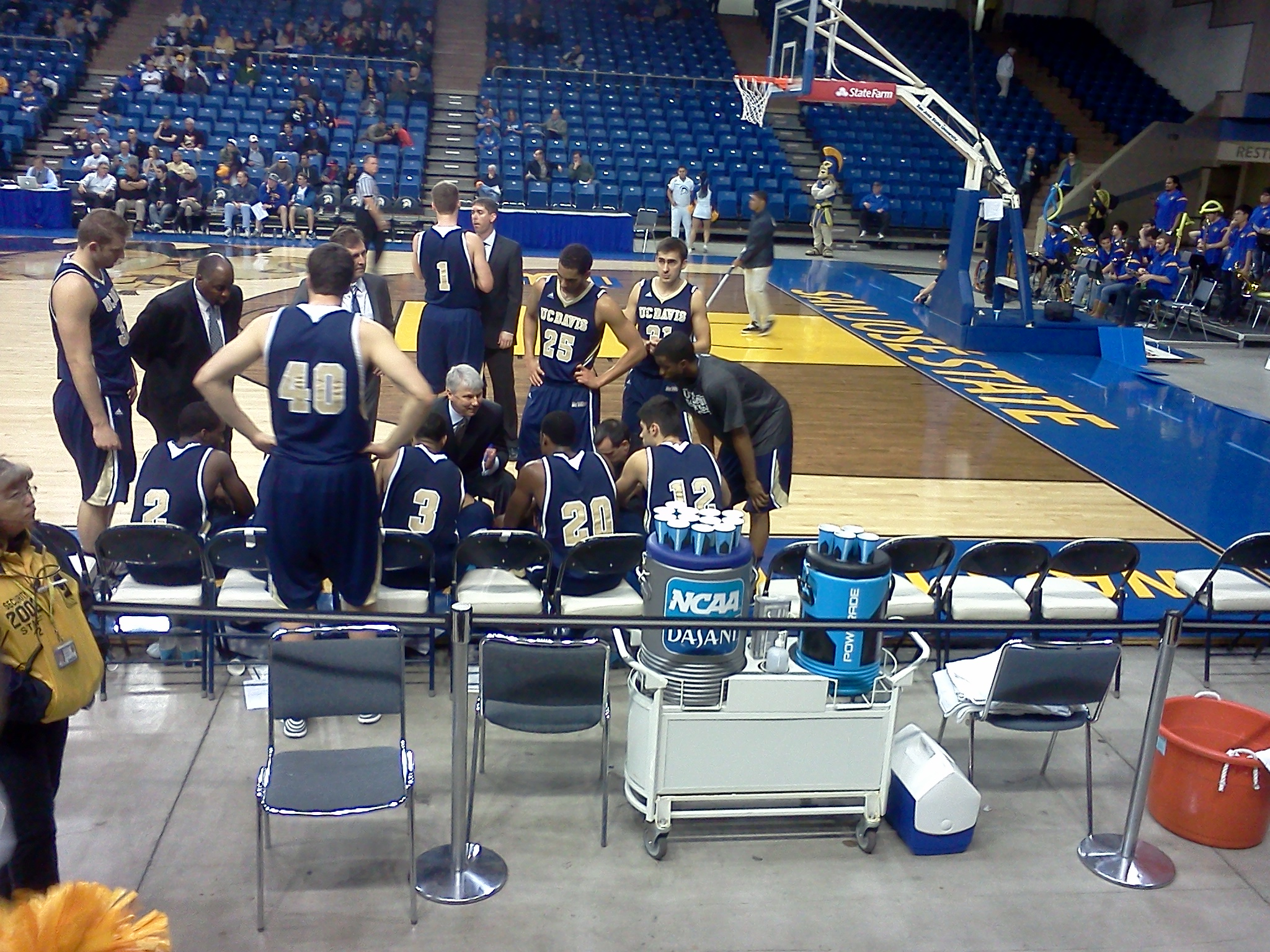
Jim Les in the huddle with UC Davis

Following his NBA career, Les was an assistant coach for the WNBA's Sacramento Monarchs from 1999 to 2001. Les was on the staff of Monarchs head coach Sonny Allen in 1999 and 2000 and Maura McHugh in 2001. In all three seasons with Les as an assistant coach, the Monarchs made the WNBA Playoffs and advanced to the 2001 WNBA Conference Finals.

In 2002, he returned to his alma mater Bradley University as head coach, where he led Bradley to an improved record in each of his first two seasons. The Bradley Braves advanced to the Sweet Sixteen in the NCAA tournament in 2006. The following year the Braves exceeded expectations to make it to the NIT. In 2008, the Braves participated in their third consecutive postseason tournament when they were invited to the first annual College Basketball Invitational tournament. The Braves advanced to the CBI finals, defeating Cincinnati, Ohio University and Virginia, while losing two games to one to Tulsa in the CBI championship round.

In 2009, the Braves participated in their fourth consecutive postseason tournament when they were invited to the first annual CollegeInsider.com Postseason Tournament. The Braves beat Austin Peay 81–74 in the first round of the tournament, and then went on to beat Oakland University 76–75 on a miracle 70-foot shot by Chris Roberts at the buzzer to earn Les his fourth consecutive 20-win season. The Braves advanced to the CIT finals with a win over Pacific, while losing to Old Dominion 66–62 in the CIT championship game. The Bradley Braves finished the 2009–10 season in fifth place at 9–9 in the Missouri Valley Conference. Bradley finished the 2010–11 season tied for ninth place at 4–14 in the Missouri Valley Conference.

Professional basketball players who played at Bradley under Les include Zach Andrews, Danny Granger, and Patrick O'Bryant.

Les was relieved of his duties on March 6, 2011, after the Braves finished a disappointing 12–20 campaign.

Les was hired as head coach of the UC Davis Aggies in 2011. He led Davis to its first conference regular season title and postseason appearance at the Division I level in 2015, and its first Division I NCAA Tournament two years later. He followed that up with another Big West regular season title and second NIT appearance the following year. He led the Aggies to five 20-win seasons in his first 13 years at the helm.

== Personal ==
Les' older brother Tom played for the Bradley Braves from 1972 to 1975 and is the school's all-time assists leader. Their father, Richard Les, died of Parkinson's disease in 2011. Les has three children, including Tyler, who played basketball at UC Davis under him.

== Career playing statistics ==
Legend
GP	Games played	GS	Games started	MPG	Minutes per game
FG%	Field goal percentage	3P%	3-point field goal percentage	FT%	Free throw percentage
RPG	Rebounds per game	APG	Assists per game	SPG	Steals per game
BPG	Blocks per game	PPG	Points per game	**Bold**	Career high
*	Led the league

=== NBA ===
==== Regular season ====
Year	Team	GP	GS	MPG	FG%	3P%	FT%	RPG	APG	SPG	BPG	PPG
1988–89	Utah	**82***	0	9.5	.301	.071	.781	1.1	2.6	.3	**.1**	1.7
1989–90	Utah	1	0	6.0	–	–	.500	.0	1.0	.0	.0	2.0
1989–90	L.A. Clippers	6	0	14.3	.357	.000	.846	1.2	3.3	.5	.0	3.5
1990–91	Sacramento	55	**8**	**25.4**	**.444**	**.461***	.835	**2.0**	**5.4**	**1.0**	**.1**	**7.2**
1991–92	Sacramento	62	5	11.5	.385	.344	.809	1.0	2.3	.5	.0	3.7
1992–93	Sacramento	73	0	12.1	.425	.429	.840	1.2	2.3	.5	**.1**	4.5
1993–94	Sacramento	18	0	9.4	.382	.444	.846	.7	2.2	.4	**.1**	2.5
1994–95	Atlanta	24	0	7.8	.289	.217	**.852**	1.1	1.8	.2	.0	2.1
Career		321	13	13.2	.397	.396	.818	1.2	2.9	.5	.1	3.8

==== Playoffs ====
Year	Team	GP	GS	MPG	FG%	3P%	FT%	RPG	APG	SPG	BPG	PPG
1989	Utah	3	0	1.7	–	–	–	.0	.3	.0	.0	.0

== Head coaching record ==
Record table
Season	Team	Overall	Conference	Standing	Postseason
Bradley Braves (Missouri Valley Conference) (2002–2011)
2002–03	Bradley	12–18	8–10	T–5th	
2003–04	Bradley	15–16	7–11	T–6th	
2004–05	Bradley	13–15	6–12	8th	
2005–06	Bradley	22–11	11–7	T–5th	NCAA Division I Sweet 16
2006–07	Bradley	22–13	10–8	4th	NIT Second Round
2007–08	Bradley	21–17	9–9	T–5th	CBI Runner-up
2008–09	Bradley	21–15	10–8	4th	CIT Runner-up
2009–10	Bradley	16–15	9–9	5th	
2010–11	Bradley	12–20	4–14	T–9th	
Bradley:		154–140 (.524)	74–88 (.457)		
UC Davis Aggies (Big West Conference) (2011–2026)
2011–12	UC Davis	5–26	3–13	9th	
2012–13	UC Davis	14–17	9–9	6th	
2013–14	UC Davis	9–22	4–12	9th	
2014–15	UC Davis	25–7	14–2	1st	NIT First Round
2015–16	UC Davis	11–19	6–10	5th	
2016–17	UC Davis	23–13	11–5	2nd	NCAA Division I Round of 64
2017–18	UC Davis	22–11	12–4	1st	NIT First Round
2018–19	UC Davis	11–20	7–9	T–6th	
2019–20	UC Davis	14–18	8–8	5th	
2020–21	UC Davis	10–8	6–4	4th	
2021–22	UC Davis	13–11	5–6	7th	
2022–23	UC Davis	18–14	11–8	6th	
2023–24	UC Davis	20–13	14–6	3rd	
2024–25	UC Davis	15–17	9–11	6th	
2025–26	UC Davis	19–14	11–9	T–6th	
UC Davis Aggies (Mountain West) (2026–present)
2026–27	UC Davis	3–1	0–0		
UC Davis:		232–231 (.501)	130–116 (.528)		
Total:		386–371 (.510)			
National champion Postseason invitational champion Conference regular season champion Conference regular season and conference tournament champion Division regular season champion Division regular season and conference tournament champion Conference tournament champion

== See also ==
- List of NBA season leaders in three-point field goal percentage
- List of NCAA Division I men's basketball career assists leaders
