= Larry Jordan (basketball) =

American businessman and basketball executive

Charlotte Hornets
- Title: Vice President of Player Personnel

Personal information
- Born: 1962 (age 63–64)
- Listed height: 5 ft 9 in (1.75 m)
- Listed weight: 155 lb (70 kg)

Career information
- High school: Emsley A. Laney (Wilmington, North Carolina)
- College: UNC Wilmington
- Position: Shooting guard

Career history
- 1988: Chicago Express

Larry Jordan (born 1962) is an American businessman, basketball executive and former professional basketball player. He played college basketball for University of North Carolina Wilmington before playing professionally in the World Basketball League. He is an older brother of former basketball player Michael Jordan.

== Playing career ==
Noted for his vertical leap, he was drafted in the third round of the 1987 World Basketball League draft by the Chicago Express. He helped the team to a 27–27 record. In the playoffs, it reached the WBL finals where it lost to the Las Vegas Silver Streaks, 102–95.

== Executive career ==
In 2011, Jordan joined the staff of the Charlotte Bobcats, now known as Charlotte Hornets. In July 2013, he was promoted to team director of player personnel. In 2021, Jordan was promoted to the position of vice president of player personnel.

== Personal life ==
Jordan is the third of five children born to Deloris (née Peoples) and James R. Jordan Sr. He has two brothers, James R. Jordan Jr. and Michael Jordan, and two sisters, Deloris and Roslyn. James Jr. retired in 2006 as the command sergeant major of the 35th Signal Brigade of the XVIII Airborne Corps in the U.S. Army. His son, Justin Jordan, played NCAA Division I basketball for the UNC Greensboro Spartans and is a scout for the Charlotte Hornets.
