= Perry Young (basketball) =

American basketball player (born 1963)

Personal information
- Born: August 4, 1963 (age 63) Baltimore, Maryland, U.S.
- Listed height: 6 ft 5 in (1.96 m)
- Listed weight: 210 lb (95 kg)

Career information
- High school: Mount Hebron (Ellicott City, Maryland)
- College: Virginia Tech (1981–1985)
- NBA draft: 1985: 3rd round, 61st overall pick
- Drafted by: Portland Trail Blazers
- Playing career: 1985–1992
- Position: Shooting guard
- Number: 12, 24, 2

Career history
- 1985–1986: Maine Windjammers
- 1986: Bay State Bombardiers
- 1986–1987: Wyoming Wildcatters
- 1987: Chicago Bulls
- 1987: Portland Trail Blazers
- 1987: Jersey Jammers
- 1987–1988: Charleston Gunners
- 1988–1989: Quad City Thunder
- 1989: Calgary 88's
- 1989–1990: Quad City Thunder
- 1990–1991: Oklahoma City Cavalry
- 1991–1992: Tri-City Chinook
- 1992: Calgary 88's
- 1992: Winnipeg Thunder

Career highlights
- First-team All-Metro Conference (1985)
- Stats at NBA.com
- Stats at Basketball Reference

Perry Young (born August 4, 1963) is an American former professional basketball player who played one season in the National Basketball Association (NBA) with the Portland Trail Blazers and the Chicago Bulls during the 1986–87 season. A shooting guard, he was drafted by the Trail Blazers during the third round (61st pick overall) in the 1985 NBA draft from Virginia Tech.

== Professional career ==
Originally from Baltimore, Maryland, Young started his career in 1985 with the Maine Windjammers in the Continental Basketball Association. He then finished the season with the Bay State Bombardiers, playing 11 postseason games, averaging 19.9 points, 6 rebounds and 3.4 assists in 37.5 minutes per game. He started the 1986–1987 season with the Wyoming Wildcatters, another CBA franchise, and played 25 games with the team, averaging 15.6 points, 3.7 rebounds and 3.4 assists before being called up in the National Basketball Association by the Chicago Bulls. He also appeared for the Portland Trail Blazers during the season.

In 1987 he had a stint in the United States Basketball League, playing for the Jersey Jammers; he then joined the Charleston Gunners in the CBA, and he transferred mid-season to the Quad City Thunder. He played two seasons with the Thunder (1988–89 and 1989–90), and in 1989 he also played for the Calgary 88's of the World Basketball League, leading the league in blocks with 1.33 blocks per game. In 1992 he returned to the 88's but refused to report due to a personality conflict and on May 21, 1992 was subsequently traded to the Winnipeg Thunder. After his appearances in the WBL he played two more seasons in the CBA, one with the Oklahoma City Cavalry and one with the Tri-City Chinook.

== Career statistics ==
Legend
GP	Games played	GS	Games started	MPG	Minutes per game
FG%	Field goal percentage	3P%	3-point field goal percentage	FT%	Free throw percentage
RPG	Rebounds per game	APG	Assists per game	SPG	Steals per game
BPG	Blocks per game	PPG	Points per game	**Bold**	Career high

=== NBA ===
==== Regular season ====
Year	Team	GP	GS	MPG	FG%	3P%	FT%	RPG	APG	SPG	BPG	PPG
1986–87	Chicago	**5**	0	4.0	**.500**	–	**.500**	.2	.0	.2	.0	1.0
1986–87	Portland	4	0	**13.0**	.235	–	–	**1.8**	**1.8**	**1.0**	**.3**	**2.0**
Career		9	0	8.0	.286	–	.500	.9	.8	.6	.1	1.4
