= Barry Mitchell (basketball) =

American basketball player (1965–2025)

Personal information
- Born: April 28, 1965 Virginia Beach, Virginia, U.S.
- Died: December 17, 2025 (aged 60)
- Listed height: 6 ft 5 in (1.96 m)
- Listed weight: 220 lb (100 kg)

Career information
- High school: First Colonial (Virginia Beach, Virginia)
- College: Norfolk State (1983–1987)
- NBA draft: 1987: undrafted
- Playing career: 1987–2014
- Position: Small forward

Career history
- 1987–1988: Wyoming Wildcatters
- 1988–1990: Youngstown Pride
- 1991–1994: Quad City Thunder
- 1994–1999: Sunair Oostende
- 1999–2000: Siemens Gent
- 2001–2002: Liège
- 2002–2003: Nantes
- 2013–2014: BC Alleur

Career highlights
- 2× Belgian Cup winner (1997, 1998); Belgian League champion (1995); CBA champion (1994); CBA MVP (1992); All-CBA First Team (1992); CBA Defensive Player of the Year (1992); CBA All-Defensive Team (1992); CBA steals leader (1992); 2× WBL champion (1989, 1990); 2× WBL MVP (1989, 1990); 3× WBL All-Defensive Team (1988–1990); 3× All-CIAA (1985–1987)

Barry Jeffrey Mitchell (April 28, 1965 – December 17, 2025) was an American professional basketball player.

== College career ==
Mitchell attended First Colonial High School in his hometown of Virginia Beach, Virginia. During his time there he was a standout athlete in basketball and earned All-State honors. He then enrolled at Norfolk State where he studied physical education.

At the time, Norfolk State was playing in the NCAA Division II and competed in the Central Intercollegiate Athletic Association. In his 4-year career Mitchell played 119 games, totalling 1,631 points (13.7 average), 928 rebounds (7.8), 502 assists (4.2) and 235 steals (2.0). He recorded 2 triple-doubles in his career, both in the month of February 1987: he had 21 points, 10 rebounds and 11 assists versus Johnson C. Smith on February 27, and 30 points, 10 rebounds and 12 assists versus Shaw on February 4.

He led the team in rebounds for 3 consecutive seasons from 1984 to 1987, in assists in 1985–86 (4.9 average) and 1986–87 (5.1), and was the steals leader in 1986–87. Mitchell was named in the All-CIAA Team for three consecutive seasons from 1985 to 1987.

== Professional career ==
After his 4-year college career, Mitchell was automatically eligible for the 1987 NBA draft, but he was not selected by an NBA franchise and decided to sign for the Wyoming Wildcatters of the Continental Basketball Association. During his first professional season, he appeared in 52 games, averaging 8.4 points, 5.0 rebounds, 2.2 assists and 1.3 steals in regular season play. His team qualified for the playoffs and reached the CBA finals, where they were defeated by the Albany Patroons in 7 games: Mitchell averaged 12.3 points, 7.0 rebounds, 4.5 assists and 2.5 steals in 19 games played during the postseason. Mitchell then decided to join the Youngstown Pride, a team which competed in the World Basketball League, a league that only accepted players 6 ft 5 in tall and under. In three years he experienced significant success, winning the championship in 1989 and 1990 and being named the league's MVP twice. He was also named in the All-Defensive team three times from 1988 to 1990.

He returned to the CBA in January 1991, joining the Quad City Thunder where he played the last 14 games of the regular season and 17 games in the playoffs, where his team lost in the finals to the Wichita Falls Texans. He averaged 8.0 points, 6.0 rebounds, 3.1 assists and 1.5 steals in the regular season, and 13.1 points, 10.7 rebounds, 3.6 assists and 2.9 steals in postseason play.

The 1991–92 CBA season was the best of Mitchell's career. He started 52 of the 55 regular season games he played, and averaged 20.1 points, 8.6 rebounds, 5.0 assists and 2.9 steals, leading the CBA in steals. Mitchell showed again his defensive prowess, and significantly improved his scoring average to 20.1 points per game. He led his team in scoring and rebounding and was named the league's Player of the Year and Defensive Player of the Year, the first time in CBA history in which both awards went to the same player. He started all of his 9 playoffs games, and he averaged 19.7 points, 9.3 rebounds, 6.0 assists and 2.6 steals. He was also selected to the All-CBA First Team and All-Defensive Team.

Mitchell played two more seasons with the Thunder: the signing of Derek Strong in the 1992–93 season made him the second scoring option, and he averaged 16.7 points, 5.7 rebounds, 5.6 assists and 2.1 steals in 27 games. He did not appear in any of the postseason games. The 1993–94 season was Mitchell's last with the team, and he came from the bench more often, starting only 24 of his 43 games. He averaged 13.0 points, 5.8 rebounds, 4.7 assists and 2.3 steals; he regained his starting role during the playoffs, and in 13 games (all starts) he averaged 16.2 points, 6.5 rebounds, 4.2 assists and 1.7 steals. He led the Thunder to their first CBA Championship, in five games over the Omaha Racers.

He was one of Quad City Thunder's most successful players and holds several distinctions with the team: he is the all-time leader in steals with 338, and he ranks 2nd in points (2,226), 2nd in minutes played (5,203), 3rd in number of games played (139), 3rd in rebounds (962) and 4th in assists (668).

In 1994, he decided to transfer to Europe and signed with Belgian team Sunair Ostende. He spent several seasons with the club, playing his last game in 1999. During his tenure at Ostende he won the Belgian league once in 1995 and Belgian cup twice in 1997 and 1998.

Mitchell then played for Siemens Gent in the 1999–2000 season, and of Liège in the 2001–02 season. He moved to French team Nantes in 2002, playing 15 games with average of 6.3 points, 5.9 rebounds 2.8 assists and 1.1 steals.

In 2013–14, he played for B.C. Alleur, in the Belgian lower leagues.

== Personal life and death ==
Mitchell's son, Ajay, played college basketball for the UC Santa Barbara Gauchos and as of 2025, plays for the Oklahoma City Thunder in the NBA.

Mitchell died from a heart attack on December 17, 2025, at the age of 60.
