= Doug Lee (basketball) =

American basketball player (born 1964)

Personal information
- Born: October 24, 1964 (age 62) Washington, Illinois, U.S.
- Listed height: 6 ft 4 in (1.93 m)
- Listed weight: 235 lb (107 kg)

Career information
- High school: Washington (Washington, Illinois)
- College: Texas A&M (1982–1984); Purdue (1985–1987)
- NBA draft: 1987: 2nd round, 35th overall pick
- Drafted by: Houston Rockets
- Playing career: 1988–2000
- Position: Shooting guard / small forward
- Number: 20

Career history
- 1988–1989: Albany Patroons
- 1989: Illinois Express
- 1990: Hapoel Tel Aviv
- 1990–1991: Rockford Lightning
- 1991: Grand Rapids Hoops
- 1991–1992: New Jersey Nets
- 1992–1993: La Crosse Catbirds
- 1993: New Jersey Nets
- 1993–1994: Cibona Zagreb
- 1994–1995: Sacramento Kings
- 1995: Koncret Rimini
- 1996–1997: Rockford Lightning
- 1997: La Crosse Bobcats
- 1999–2000: Las Vegas Silver Bandits
- Stats at NBA.com
- Stats at Basketball Reference

Douglas Edward Lee (born October 24, 1964) is an American former professional basketball player.

A 6-foot-5-inch (1.96 m) guard-forward from Texas A&M University and Purdue University, in the 1987 NCAA Division I men's basketball tournament Lee as team captain led No. 3 seeded 1986–87 Purdue Boilermakers men's basketball team to the round of 32, with his team defeating the Northeastern Huskies in the opening round by 104–95. He was selected by the Houston Rockets in the 2nd round (35th overall) of the 1987 NBA draft, going on to play in three National Basketball Association (NBA) seasons for New Jersey Nets (1991–93) and Sacramento Kings (1994–95).

In his NBA career, Lee played in 73 games, played 415 minutes, and scored a total of 168 points.
