= Igors Miglinieks =

Latvian basketball player

Beijing Ducks
- Title: Assistant coach
- League: CBA

Personal information
- Born: 4 May 1964 (age 62) Riga, Latvian SSR, Soviet Union
- Listed height: 6 ft 4.5 in (1.94 m)
- Listed weight: 212 lb (96 kg)

Career information
- NBA draft: 1986: undrafted
- Playing career: 1981–2000
- Position: Point guard / shooting guard
- Number: 13
- Coaching career: 1997, 2000–present–present

Career history

Playing
- 1981–1985: VEF Rīga
- 1985–1989: CSKA Moscow
- 1989–1990: VEF Rīga
- 1990: Erie Wave
- 1990–1992: VEF Rīga
- 1992–1994: Braunschweig
- 1994–1995: VEF/Ādaži Rīga
- 1995: CSKA Moscow
- 1995–1996: LainERS Riga
- 1996–1997: Olimpas Plungė
- 1997: Cherno More
- 1997–1998: Žito Vardar
- 1998–1999: Blonay Basket
- 1999: LainERS Riga
- 1999–2000: ASK/Brocēni/LMT

Coaching
- 1997: Latvia
- 2000–2001: BK LMT
- 2001–2003: Kyiv
- 2004: Arsenal Tula
- 2004–2005: Rīga
- 2005–2007: AEL Limassol
- 2005: China (assistant)
- 2007–2009: Latvia (assistant)
- 2007–2008: Spartak St. Petersburg
- 2008–2009: Donetsk
- 2009–2010: Czarni Słupsk
- 2010–2011: AEK Larnaca
- 2011–2012: Apollon Limassol
- 2012–2013: Barons Kvartāls (assistant)
- 2013–2014: Guangdong Southern Tigers (assistant)
- 2014: BK Jēkabpils
- 2014–2015: Guangdong Southern Tigers (assistant)
- 2015–2016: BK Jēkabpils
- 2017–2018: Xinjiang Flying Tigers (assistant)
- 2018–2020: Guangdong Southern Tigers (assistant)
- 2021–2022: BC Budivelnyk
- 2022–2026: Guangdong Southern Tigers (assistant)
- 2026–present: Beijing Ducks (assistant)

Career highlights
- As a player: FIBA European Selection (1991); USSR League champion (1988); Master of Sports of the USSR (1988); As a head coach: 2× Cypriot League champion (2006, 2007); 2× Cypriot Supercup winner (2005, 2006); As an assistant coach: 2× CBA champion (2019, 2020)
Medals
Men's basketball
Representing Soviet Union
Olympic Games
Gold medal – first place	1988 Seoul
European Championship for Juniors
Gold medal – first place	1982 Bulgaria	U-18 Team
European Championship for Cadets
Gold medal – first place	1981 Greece	U-16 Team

Igors Miglinieks (born 4 May 1964) is a retired Soviet and Latvian professional basketball player and coach. He played at the point guard and shooting guard positions.

== Professional career ==
Miglinieks was a member of the World Basketball League's Erie Wave in 1990. Miglinieks was also a member of the FIBA European Selection team, in 1991.

== National team career ==
Miglinieks was a member of the senior Soviet Union national team. With the Soviet Union, he won a gold medal at the 1988 Summer Olympics, becoming the first Latvian basketball player to win the gold medal at the Summer Olympic Games.

== Coaching career ==
After he retired from playing professional basketball, Miglinieks had a long coaching career, working as a head coach in numerous teams and leagues.

== Personal life ==
Miglinieks' brother, Raimonds, was also a professional basketball player.
