= Great Plains Coliseum =

Multi-purpose arena in Lawton, Oklahoma

Coordinates: 34.5991°N 98.4189°W

- Capacity: 3,000

Tenants
- Lawton-Fort Sill Cavalry (CBA/PBL) (2008–2011); 580 RollerGirls (2011–present)

The Great Plains Coliseum is a 3,000-seat multi-purpose arena in Lawton, Oklahoma, USA. It hosts local sporting events and concerts.

It was home to the Lawton-Fort Sill Cavalry, who last played in 2011, and the 580 RollerGirls, who started play in 2011.

Lawton's Largest Garage, Antiques, and Collectibles Sale, an annual event hosted by Twosquare Media Lawton, takes place at the Great Plains Coliseum.

| Preceded by Cox Convention Center | Home of the Oklahoma Cavalry/Lawton-Fort Sill Cavalry/580 RollerGirls; 2007 – present | Succeeded by Current |
