= Kelsey Weems =

American basketball player (1967–2019)

Personal information
- Born: September 16, 1967 Atlanta, Georgia, U.S.
- Died: August 20, 2019 (aged 51) Atlanta, Georgia, U.S.
- Listed height: 6 ft 2 in (1.88 m)
- Listed weight: 180 lb (82 kg)

Career information
- High school: Walker (DeKalb County, Georgia)
- College: NC State (1985–1989)
- NBA draft: 1989: undrafted
- Playing career: 1989–1999
- Position: Point guard

Career history
- 1989–1990: Quad City Thunder
- 1990–1991: Oklahoma City Cavalry
- 1991: Calgary 88s
- 1991–1993: Oklahoma City Cavalry
- 1993–1994: Hartford Hellcats
- 1994–1995: Rockford Lightning
- 1995–1996: Yakima SunKings
- 1996–1997: Omaha Racers
- 1998: Trotamundos de Carabobo
- 1998–1999: Sydney Kings

Career highlights
- WBL Sixth Man of the Year (1991)
Medals
Men's basketball
Representing United States
Pan American Games
Silver medal – second place	1995 Mar del Plata	Team competition
FIBA Americas Championship
Gold medal – first place	1993 San Juan	Team competition

Kelsey Russell Weems (September 16, 1967 – August 20, 2019) was an American professional basketball player. A point guard from the state of Georgia, Weems played college basketball at NC State and stayed four years despite limited playing time. He went undrafted in the 1989 NBA draft and played several seasons in the CBA, earning two selections in the United States national team: he won the gold medal during the 1993 Tournament of the Americas and the silver medal at the 1995 Pan American Games.

== High school career ==
A native of Atlanta, Weems played basketball at Walker High School (now McNair High School) as a point guard, and was part of the team since his sophomore year. As a junior, he averaged 13.5 points and 10 assists per game, shooting 54% from the field, and in his senior year, he greatly improved his scoring, reaching an average of 27.8 points per game until the month of January, and ended the season with a 27.0 average. He recorded a near-triple double in the title game for the 4-AAA state tournament against Upson with 32 points, 9 rebounds and 10 assists; his team lost 90–63. During his senior year he was considered one of the best prospects in the state of Georgia at the point guard position, and was nationally ranked among the best senior guards.

== College career ==
Weems was heavily recruited in high school and received offers from Alabama, Auburn, Clemson, Georgia, Kentucky and NC State. After restricting his choice between Auburn and NC State, he ultimately signed with the latter on April 10, 1985. Coach Jim Valvano included Weems in the rotation, giving him limited playing time behind Nate McMillan, but putting him in the starting five on 4 occasions. In his freshman year Weems averaged 3.5 points, 0.9 rebounds and 1.8 assists in 9.2 minutes per game.

After McMillan graduated, the point guard spot was taken by Vinny Del Negro, and Weems again came off the bench, playing 35 games (with 1 start) and posting averages of 3.9 points, 0.9 rebounds and 1.6 assists in 11.4 minutes per game. Weems' junior season saw him lose playing time also due to the arrival of another point guard, Chris Corchiani. Weems played 31 games but averaged career-lows in the major statistical categories, posting 1.9 points, 0.4 rebounds and 1.5 assists in 7 minutes per game. For his senior season Weems received more playing time, and in 26 appearances (1 start) he averaged 7.5 points, 1.2 rebounds, 2.3 assists and 0.7 steals, all career-highs.

In 1990 he was involved in a point shaving investigation: Weems contacted ABC News, which broadcast a report on the scandal. The scandal was one of the reasons for Valvano's resignation.

=== College statistics ===
Year	Team	GP	GS	MPG	FG%	3P%	FT%	RPG	APG	SPG	BPG	PPG
1985–86	NC State	24	4	9.2	.578	–	.524	0.9	1.8	0.5	0.0	3.5
1986–87	NC State	35	1	11.4	.591	.500	.589	0.9	1.6	0.4	0.1	3.9
1987–88	NC State	31	0	7.0	.511	.000	.542	0.4	1.5	0.5	0.0	1.9
1988–89	NC State	26	1	16.5	.542	.455	.600	1.2	2.3	0.7	0.2	7.5
Career		116	6	10.9	.558	.429	.578	0.8	1.8	0.5	0.1	4.1

== Professional career ==
After the end of his senior season, Weems was automatically eligible for the 1989 NBA draft, but he was not drafted by an NBA franchise. He was drafted by the Rockford Lightning in the 5th round of the 1989 CBA draft (77th overall). Weems participated in camps with the Washington Bullets and the Boston Celtics, but was not included in the final rosters. He then signed with the Quad City Thunder and played in the 1989–90 CBA season, averaging 9.5 points, 4 assists and 1 steal in 32 games (21.9 minutes per game).

In 1990 Weems joined the Oklahoma City Cavalry, an expansion franchise in the CBA, and played 52 games in the season, averaging 18.3 points and 7 assists per game. In 1991 he played with the Calgary 88s of the World Basketball League, and won the Sixth Man Award. In the following season he posted averages of 13.4 points and 5.8 assists, and reached the playoffs, during which he averaged 18.6 points and 3 assists in 5 games. In the summer of 1992 Weems played for the Seattle SuperSonics in summer preseason games, but was not confirmed in the final roster. He also was part of the preseason Chicago Bulls roster, and was released on October 14, 1992. He then came back to the Cavalry, leading the team in scoring in 1992–93 with an average of 17.3 points, and averaged 8.5 assists, a career-high in the CBA. In the summer of 1993 he participated in a camp with the Charlotte Hornets. He started the 1993–94 season with the Cavalry, playing 21 games, and then signed with the Hartford Hellcats, where he ended the season averaging 14.4 points and 6.6 assists per game.

Weems played the first part of the 1994–95 season with the Hellcats, starting all 14 games he played with averages of 15.3 points and 7.1 assists before being traded to the Rockford Lightning for Charles Smith in December 1994. He finished the season with Rockford starting 21 of 31 games. He also played 7 games in the playoffs, averaging 11.3 points and 6.1 assists per game. He played the 1995–96 season with the Yakima SunKings and the 1996–97 season with the Omaha Racers. In 1998 he played for Trotamundos de Carabobo in Venezuela before moving to Australia, signing with the Sydney Kings of the National Basketball League where he averaged 20 points and 5.1 assists in 1998, and 15.2 points and 3.8 assists in 1998–99.

Weems ranks 19th all-time in the CBA for points scored with 5,457.

== National team career ==
Weems was selected in the United States national team for the 1993 Tournament of the Americas, in a team formed by CBA players: during the tournament he played 7 games, averaging 9.4 points, 1.9 rebounds and was the assists leader with 4.4. Two years later he was called up again by Team USA for the 1995 Pan American Games where he played 6 games averaging 4.5 points, 1.5 rebounds and 2 assists. He earned a total of 13 appearances with the US national team.
