= Fred Cofield =

American basketball player (born 1962)

Personal information
- Born: January 4, 1962 (age 64) Ypsilanti, Michigan, U.S.
- Listed height: 6 ft 3 in (1.91 m)
- Listed weight: 189 lb (86 kg)

Career information
- High school: Ypsilanti (Ypsilanti, Michigan)
- College: Oregon (1980–1982); Eastern Michigan (1983–1985)
- NBA draft: 1985: 4th round, 73rd overall pick
- Drafted by: New York Knicks
- Playing career: 1985–1996
- Position: Point guard
- Number: 35, 11

Career history
- 1985–1986: New York Knicks
- 1986–1987: Albany Patroons
- 1987: Chicago Bulls
- 1987–1991: Rockford Lightning
- 1988: Chicago Express
- 1989: Fórum Valladolid
- 1990–1991: Youngstown Pride
- 1992–1993: Rapid City Thrillers
- 1993–1994: Victoria Titans
- 1994–1996: Cocodrilos de Caracas
- 1994–1995: Canberra Cannons

Career highlights
- All-CBA Second Team (1988); First-team All-MAC (1985); Second-team All-MAC (1984)
- Stats at NBA.com
- Stats at Basketball Reference

Frederick Cofield (born January 4, 1962) is an American former basketball player. He was a 6-foot-3-inch (1.91 m), 190 lb (86 kg) point guard.

Born in Ypsilanti, Michigan, Cofield played college basketball for the Oregon Ducks and Eastern Michigan Eagles.

He was selected by the New York Knicks in the fourth round (73rd pick overall) of the 1985 NBA draft.

He played for the Knicks (1985–86), and Chicago Bulls (1986–87) in the National Basketball Association for 50 games.

Cofield played in the Continental Basketball Association (CBA) for the Albany Patroons, Rockford Lightning and Rapid City Thrillers from 1986 to 1993. He was selected to the All-CBA Second Team in 1988.

== Career statistics ==
Legend
GP	Games played	GS	Games started	MPG	Minutes per game
FG%	Field goal percentage	3P%	3-point field goal percentage	FT%	Free throw percentage
RPG	Rebounds per game	APG	Assists per game	SPG	Steals per game
BPG	Blocks per game	PPG	Points per game	**Bold**	Career high

=== NBA ===
==== Regular season ====
Year	Team	GP	GS	MPG	FG%	3P%	FT%	RPG	APG	SPG	BPG	PPG
1985–86	New York	**45**	**1**	**10.4**	**.408**	**.200**	**.600**	**1.0**	**1.8**	**.4**	**.1**	**3.7**
1986–87	Chicago	5	0	5.4	.182	.000	–	**1.0**	.8	**.4**	.0	.8
Career		50	1	9.9	.395	.188	.600	1.0	1.7	.4	.1	3.4
