= Anthony Jones (basketball, born 1962) =

American basketball player (born 1962)

Personal information
- Born: September 13, 1962 (age 64) Washington, D.C., U.S.
- Listed height: 6 ft 6 in (1.98 m)
- Listed weight: 195 lb (88 kg)

Career information
- High school: Dunbar (Washington, D.C.)
- College: Georgetown (1981–1983); UNLV (1984–1986)
- NBA draft: 1986: 1st round, 21st overall pick
- Drafted by: Washington Bullets
- Playing career: 1986–1991
- Position: Shooting guard / small forward
- Number: 44, 11, 22, 21

Career history
- 1986: Washington Bullets
- 1986–1987: San Antonio Spurs
- 1987–1988: Allentown Jets
- 1988: Las Vegas Silver Streaks
- 1988: Chicago Bulls
- 1988: Palm Beach Stingrays
- 1989–1990: Dallas Mavericks
- 1990–1991: Libertas Livorno

Career highlights
- PCAA Player of the Year (1986); First-team All-PCAA (1986); First-team Parade All-American (1981); McDonald's All-American (1981)
- Stats at NBA.com
- Stats at Basketball Reference

Anthony Hamilton Jones (born September 13, 1962) is an American retired professional basketball player. He was a 6-foot-6-inch (198 cm) 195 pounds (88 kg) swingman and played collegiately at Georgetown University from 1981 to 1983, and at University of Nevada, Las Vegas from 1984 to 1986. He played in the National Basketball Association (NBA) from 1986 to 1990.

Jones was selected with the 21st pick of the first round in the 1986 NBA draft by the Washington Bullets. He played for the Bullets, Chicago Bulls, San Antonio Spurs, and Dallas Mavericks. He also played in Italy for Libertas Livorno, and in the USBL and WBL.

== Career statistics ==
Legend
GP	Games played	GS	Games started	MPG	Minutes per game
FG%	Field goal percentage	3P%	3-point field goal percentage	FT%	Free throw percentage
RPG	Rebounds per game	APG	Assists per game	SPG	Steals per game
BPG	Blocks per game	PPG	Points per game	**Bold**	Career high

=== NBA ===
==== Regular season ====
Year	Team	GP	GS	MPG	FG%	3P%	FT%	RPG	APG	SPG	BPG	PPG
1986–87	Washington	16	1	7.1	**.424**	.000	.692	.6	.4	.6	.1	2.3
1986–87	San Antonio	49	**3**	**15.2**	.412	**.368**	.788	**1.9**	**1.3**	**.7**	**.4**	**5.8**
1988–89	Chicago	8	0	8.1	.333	.000	**1.000**	1.0	.5	.3	.1	1.5
1988–89	Dallas	25	0	5.2	.375	.267	.857	.8	.5	.4	.1	2.6
1989–90	Dallas	**66**	0	9.8	.371	.308	.681	1.2	.4	.5	.2	3.0
Career		164	4	10.4	.393	.306	.740	1.3	.7	.5	.2	3.6

==== Playoffs ====
Year	Team	GP	GS	MPG	FG%	3P%	FT%	RPG	APG	SPG	BPG	PPG
1990	Dallas	1	0	3.0	–	–	–	.0	.0	.0	0	.0
