= Reggie Hannah =

American basketball player

Personal information
- Born: August 4, 1959 Titusville, Florida, U.S.
- Died: October 23, 2015 (aged 56)
- Listed height: 6 ft 10 in (2.08 m)
- Listed weight: 215 lb (98 kg)

Career information
- High school: Titusville (Titusville, Florida)
- College: Florida (1977–1980); South Alabama (1981–1982)
- NBA draft: 1982: 4th round, 70th overall pick
- Drafted by: Cleveland Cavaliers
- Position: Forward

Career history
- 1982–1983: Wyoming Wildcatters
- 1987: CEP Lorient

Career highlights
- First-team Parade All-American (1977)
- Stats at Basketball Reference

Reggie Hannah (August 4, 1959 – October 23, 2015) was an American professional basketball player.

A native of Titusville, Florida, Hannah led Titusville High to a pair of state title appearances in the mid-1970s. He played college basketball for Florida and South Alabama before being selected by the Cleveland Cavaliers in the fourth round (70th overall pick) of 1982 NBA draft. He never played in the NBA, but did play in Sweden, France, and the Netherlands. Hannah played eight games for the Wyoming Wildcatters of the Continental Basketball Association during the 1982–83 season. He played four games with CEP Lorient in France in 1987.

After his playing career ended when he was aged 35, Hannah returned to Titusville and started dealing cocaine due to the allure of drug money. He served three stints in jail: 11 months in 1999–2000, 15 months in 2006–2007 and six months in 2011. Hannah also developed his own addiction to drugs and experienced homelessness. In 2012, he received assistance from his high school basketball coach, Kirk Stewart, who took him to a Christian drug rehabilitation center where he stayed for five months. Hannah credits his discovery of religion for changing his life and stopping his drug addiction. He earned a handyman's license and ran a small business.

According to Florida Today, Hannah died on October 23, 2015, of pancreatic cancer. Hannah was divorced and had seven children.
