= Mark Wade =

American basketball player (born 1965)

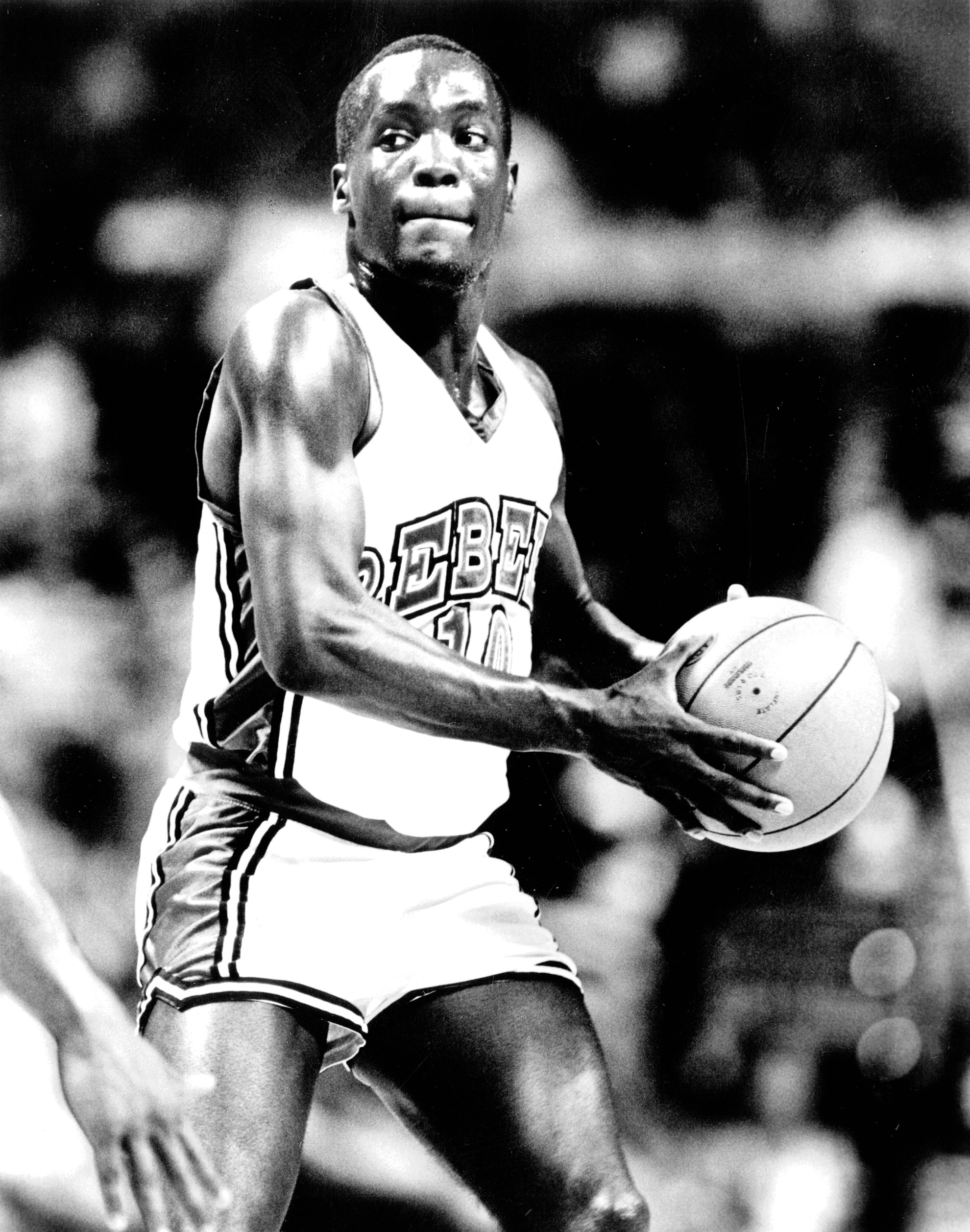
- Wade at UNLV in 1986–87

Personal information
- Born: October 15, 1965 (age 61) Torrance, California, U.S.
- Listed height: 5 ft 11 in (1.80 m)
- Listed weight: 160 lb (73 kg)

Career information
- High school: Banning (Los Angeles, California)
- College: Oklahoma (1983–1984); El Camino CC (1984–1985); UNLV (1985–1987)
- NBA draft: 1987: undrafted
- Playing career: 1987–1995
- Position: Point guard
- Number: 4, 10

Career history
- 1987: Pensacola Tornados
- 1987–1988: Quad City Thunder
- 1988: Golden State Warriors
- 1988–1991: Pensacola Tornados
- 1990: Dallas Mavericks
- 1991: Youngstown Pride
- 1991–1992: Birmingham Bandits
- 1992: La Crosse Catbirds
- 1992: Omaha Racers
- 1992–1993: Columbus Horizon
- 1993–1994: Hartford Hellcats
- 1994: Wichita Falls Texans
- 1994–1995: Sioux Falls Skyforce

Career highlights
- All-CBA First Team (1990); 3× CBA assists leader (1988, 1989, 1991); First-team All-PCAA (1987)
- Stats at NBA.com
- Stats at Basketball Reference

Mark Anthony Wade (born October 15, 1965) is an American former professional basketball player. A 5-foot-11-inch (1.8 m) and 160-pound (72.6 kg) point guard, Wade played college basketball for the UNLV Runnin' Rebels, setting the NCAA record for assists in a season, with 406 (in 38 games) in 1986–87. He spent the 1987–88 NBA season with the Golden State Warriors, and played one game for the Dallas Mavericks in 1989–90.

In 2002, Wade was named assistant coach for the St. Bonaventure Bonnies men's basketball team. Previously, he had served as an assistant coach with Long Island University-Southampton, Florida Atlantic University, and Cheyenne High School, and was a player-assistant coach with the International Basketball League's Las Vegas Silver Bandits.

== Legal troubles ==
On July 12, 2007, an arrest warrant was issued by the Riverside County Superior Court, alleging Wade violated California Penal Code section 503, embezzlement over $400. Wade was hired as an assistant coach at the University of California, Riverside in April 2005. He was fired on January 5, 2007. Wade has been charged with embezzling more than $15,000, some of which he was supposed to use to cover team expenses while the squad was playing road games during the 2006 Christmas break, even though Wade did not accompany the team on that trip.

The embezzled funds include two UCR checks in the amounts of $5,963.00 and $2,430, an electronic funds transfer in the amount of $2,016 and a $1,548 travel cash advance he received in November.

Furthermore, Wade maintained a past due balance of $3,868.40 on his UCR corporate bank card that the university said it ended up writing off as a loss.

In March 2008, Wade pleaded guilty to embezzlement. He was sentenced on May 14, 2008. He was placed on three years' probation and handed a 150-day jail sentence. He started serving the time on a work-release program in August 2008.

== Career statistics ==
Legend
GP	Games played	GS	Games started	MPG	Minutes per game
FG%	Field goal percentage	3P%	3-point field goal percentage	FT%	Free throw percentage
RPG	Rebounds per game	APG	Assists per game	SPG	Steals per game
BPG	Blocks per game	PPG	Points per game	**Bold**	Career high

=== NBA ===
==== Regular season ====
Year	Team	GP	GS	MPG	FG%	3P%	FT%	RPG	APG	SPG	BPG	PPG
1987–88	Golden State	**11**	0	**11.2**	**.150**	.000	**.500**	**1.4**	**3.1**	**.6**	**.1**	**.7**
1989–90	Dallas	1	0	3.0	–	–	–	.0	2.0	.0	.0	.0
Career		12	0	10.5	.150	.000	.500	1.3	3.0	.6	.1	.7

== See also ==
- List of NCAA Division I men's basketball players with 20 or more assists in a game
