= Nashville Stars =

- Division: Southern Division
- League: World Basketball League
- Founded: 1991
- Dissolved: 1991
- History: Las Vegas Silver Streaks (1988–1990); Nashville Stars (1991)
- Arena: Nashville Municipal Auditorium
- Capacity: 8,000
- Location: Nashville, Tennessee
- Team colors: Blue, gray, gold
- President: Ronnie Steine et al.
- Head coach: Ron Greene
- Championships: 0

The Nashville Stars were a professional basketball team that played in the World Basketball League (WBL) in 1991. They were located in Nashville, Tennessee, and played their home games at the Nashville Municipal Auditorium. Prior to arriving in Nashville, the franchise played in Las Vegas, Nevada, as the Las Vegas Silver Streaks. The Stars disbanded after the 1991 season in which they placed fourth in the Southern Division with a 23–28 record.

The team was led by veteran collegiate coach Ron Greene. He was assisted by Kevin Legate, who had played at Nashville's Belmont University.

Notable players included 1988 WBL Most Valuable Player and three-time All-WBL selection Jamie Waller and 1991 All-WBL selection Daren Queenan, who was named to the 1991 All-WBL team. The only Star to reach the National Basketball Association was Cedric Hunter, who played one minute of one game with the Charlotte Hornets in 1992.

== Media ==
Radio broadcasts were carried locally by WAMB 1160 AM with local talk show host Gregory Ruff as the play-by-play announcer.

== Season by season record ==
Season	GP	W	L	Pct.	GB	Finish	Playoffs
1991	51	23	28	.451	13	4th WBL Southern Division	Did not Qualify
Totals	51	23	28	.451	13	–	Playoff Record 0–0
