= Jim Thomas (basketball) =

American basketball player (born 1960)

Personal information
- Born: October 19, 1960 (age 66) Lakeland, Florida, U.S.
- Listed height: 6 ft 3 in (1.91 m)
- Listed weight: 190 lb (86 kg)

Career information
- High school: Nova (Fort Lauderdale, Florida)
- College: Indiana (1979–1983)
- NBA draft: 1983: 2nd round, 40th overall pick
- Drafted by: Indiana Pacers
- Playing career: 1983–1994
- Position: Shooting guard
- Number: 16, 21, 20

Career history

Playing
- 1983–1985: Indiana Pacers
- 1985: Evansville Thunder
- 1985: Los Angeles Clippers
- 1985–1986: Kansas City Sizzlers
- 1987–1988: Calgary 88's
- 1988–1989: Rapid City Thrillers
- 1989: Ferro Carril Oeste
- 1989: Temuco
- 1989–1990: Rapid City Thrillers
- 1990: Minnesota Timberwolves
- 1990–1992: Omaha Racers
- 1992: Calgary 88's
- 1992–1993: Omaha Racers
- 1993–1994: Baloncesto Murcia

Coaching
- 1996–1999: Toronto Raptors (assistant)
- 2001–2004: Indiana (assistant)
- 2013–2014: Atlanta Hawks (assistant)

Career highlights
- Argentine League Finals MVP (1989); CBA champion (1993); CBA Playoff/Finals MVP (1993); CBA All-Defensive Second Team (1986); NCAA champion (1981)
- Stats at NBA.com
- Stats at Basketball Reference
Medals
Men's basketball
Representing United States
FIBA World Cup
Silver medal – second place	1982 Colombia

James Edward Thomas (born October 19, 1960) is an American former professional basketball player. He was a 6'3", 190 lb (86 kg) shooting guard.

== High school ==
Thomas played competitively at Nova High School, in Davie, Florida.

== College career ==
Thomas played college basketball at Indiana University, from 1979–1983. While playing for head coach Bobby Knight at Indiana, he was the sixth man on the 1981 national championship team, and also made the 1981 Final Four All Tournament Team, after grabbing nine rebounds off the bench, in place of foul-plagued starter Ted Kitchel, in the 63–50 title game win over North Carolina.

== Professional career ==
Thomas played professionally in the NBA, with the Indiana Pacers, L.A. Clippers, and Minnesota Timberwolves, from 1983–1990.

He also played with several teams in the Continental Basketball Association (CBA) including the Omaha Racers when they won the 1993 CBA Championship and he was selected as Playoff/Finals Most Valuable Player. He was named to the CBA All-Defensive Second Team in 1986.

== National team career ==
Thomas played with the US national team at the 1982 FIBA World Championship, winning the silver medal.

== Coaching career ==
Thomas has worked as an assistant coach or scout for several NBA teams. In 2013, he joined the Atlanta Hawks' coaching staff.

== Career statistics ==
Legend
GP	Games played	GS	Games started	MPG	Minutes per game
FG%	Field goal percentage	3P%	3-point field goal percentage	FT%	Free throw percentage
RPG	Rebounds per game	APG	Assists per game	SPG	Steals per game
BPG	Blocks per game	PPG	Points per game	**Bold**	Career high

=== NBA ===
==== Regular season ====
Year	Team	GP	GS	MPG	FG%	3P%	FT%	RPG	APG	SPG	BPG	PPG
1983–84	Indiana	72	15	16.9	.464	.091	.727	2.1	1.8	.8	.1	6.3
1984–85	Indiana	**80**	**52**	**25.7**	**.478**	**.190**	**.782**	**3.3**	**2.9**	**1.0**	.1	**11.1**
1985–86	L.A. Clippers	6	0	11.5	.400	–	.500	1.3	2.0	.8	**.2**	2.2
1990–91	Minnesota	3	0	4.7	.250	–	–	.0	.3	.3	.0	.7
Career		161	67	20.9	.471	.170	.763	2.6	2.3	.9	.1	8.4
