= Brian Howard (basketball) =

American basketball player (born 1967)

Personal information
- Born: October 19, 1967 (age 59) Winston-Salem, North Carolina, U.S.
- Listed height: 6 ft 6 in (1.98 m)
- Listed weight: 204 lb (93 kg)

Career information
- High school: North Forsyth (Winston-Salem, North Carolina)
- College: NC State (1986–1990)
- NBA draft: 1990: undrafted
- Playing career: 1990–2005
- Position: Small forward
- Number: 41

Career history
- 1990–1992: Omaha Racers
- 1992–1993: Dallas Mavericks
- 1993–1994: Francorosso Torino
- 1994–1995: Sioux Falls Skyforce
- 1995–1997: ASVEL Basket
- 1997–1998: Efes Pilsen
- 1998–1999: Olympique Antibes
- 1999–2000: Paris Basket Racing
- 2000–2001: Strasbourg IG
- 2001–2002: Élan Chalon
- 2002–2003: Paris Basket Racing
- 2003–2004: Bilbao Berri
- 2004–2005: Mlékárna Kunín

Career highlights
- CBA All-Rookie Team (1991)
- Stats at NBA.com
- Stats at Basketball Reference

Brian Eugene Howard (born October 19, 1967) is an American former professional basketball player. A 6'6" and 204 lb small forward from North Carolina State University, Howard played briefly for the NBA's Dallas Mavericks from 1992 to 1993. In 95 games for the Mavs, he averaged 6.0 points and 2.8 rebound a game. He has also played in Turkey for Efes Pilsen and in France for ASVEL Lyon-Villeurbanne.

Howard played in the Continental Basketball Association (CBA) for the Omaha Racers from 1990 to 1992 and the Sioux Falls Skyforce during the 1994–95 season. He was selected to the CBA All-Rookie Team in 1991.
