= Jacksonville Stingrays =

Pro basketball team

- League: World Basketball League
- Founded: 1992
- Arena: Jacksonville Veterans Memorial Coliseum
- Capacity: 10,276
- Location: Jacksonville, Florida
- Head coach: Eric Dennis
- Ownership: Terry May

The Jacksonville Stingrays were a professional basketball franchise based in Jacksonville, Florida in 1992. The team played its inaugural season in the World Basketball League before the league folded.

The Stingrays played its home games at the Jacksonville Veterans Memorial Coliseum.

The Stingrays were owned in part by Terry May, an insurance executive. The team was coached by Head Coach Eric Dennis and included players like Corey Gaines who went on to coach in the WNBA, Danny Person Jacksonville University star and Eldridge Recasner NBA veteran for the Nuggets, Rockets, Hawks and Clippers. Other college greats and former NBA stars like World B. Free went on to play professionally around the world. Although the team had a winning record the team was forced to cease operation soon after the All-Star break due to the WBL folding after five years in existence.

== Season by season record ==
Season	GP	W	L	Pct.	GB	Finish	Playoffs
1992	19	14	5	.736	–		Team disbands on June 15, 1992
Totals	19	14	5	.736	–	–	Playoff Record 0–0
