= Joe Dawson (basketball) =

American-Israeli basketball player

Joe Dawson ג'ו דאוסן
Personal information
- Born: May 16, 1961 (age 65) Tuscaloosa, Alabama, U.S.
- Listed height: 6 ft 5 in (1.96 m)
- Listed weight: 225 lb (102 kg)

Career information
- High school: Druid (Tuscaloosa, Alabama)
- College: Southern Miss (1978–1982)
- NBA draft: 1982: undrafted
- Playing career: 1982–2008
- Position: Forward

Career history
- 1982–1983: Maine Lumberjacks
- 1983–1985: Bay State Bombardiers
- 1985: Connecticut Colonials
- 1985–1986: Cocodrilos de Caracas
- 1986–1987: Mulhouse BC
- 1987–1988: Hapoel Holon
- 1988–1989: Évreux
- 1990–1991: Beitar Tel Aviv
- 1991: Memphis Rockers
- 1991–1994: Hapoel Eilat
- 1994–1996: Maccabi Jerusalem
- 1996–1998: Hapoel Eilat
- 1998–2001: Maccabi Rishon LeZion
- 2001–2002: Hapoel Holon
- 2002–2003: Hapoel Jerusalem
- 2003–2004: Maccabi Ashdod
- 2004–2005: Ironi Ramat Gan
- 2005–2008: Ironi Nes Ziona

Career highlights
- Israeli Basketball Premier League MVP (1992); Israeli Premier League Top Scorer (1992); Israeli Premier League Rebounding Leader (1992); First-team All-WBL (1991); LNB Pro A Best Scorer (1987); Venezuelan League MVP (1986); Second-team All-USBL (1985); 3× CBA All-Star (1983–1985); 2× All-CBA First Team (1984, 1985); CBA All-Defensive First Team (1985); CBA steals leader (1985); 2× First-team AP All-South Independent (1981–1982); Second-team AP All-South Independent (1980)

Joe Dawson (Hebrew: ג'ו דאוסן; born May 16, 1961) is an American-Israeli former professional basketball player. He played high school basketball at Druid High School in his native Tuscaloosa, Alabama, and played four years of college basketball for the Southern Miss Golden Eagles, leading the team in scoring and rebounding multiple times and was an all-conference selection. After going undrafted in the 1982 NBA draft, he started his professional career in the Continental Basketball Association, and was selected as an all-star in each of the three seasons he played there. After a brief experience in the USBL he moved abroad, playing in Venezuela and France (where he was the LNB Pro A top scorer). In 1987 he had his first experience in the Israeli league with Hapoel Holon: he would play in Israel for 14 seasons, leading the league in both scoring and rebounding in 1992. He was named the 1992 Israeli Basketball Premier League MVP. He was inducted in the Southern Miss Hall of Fame in 2011, and is the father of professional basketball player Shawn Dawson.

== High school career ==
Dawson was born in Tuscaloosa, Alabama, where he attended Druid High School. During his high school years he played both the guard and forward positions, and he was selected as a starter from his sophomore year. As a senior he averaged 21.4 points per game, shooting 53% from the field and 78% from the free throw line, and was selected in the 4A All-State first team.

== College career ==
Dawson signed to play for the Southern Miss Golden Eagles in April 1978. As a freshman Dawson scored 341 points, which at the time ranked second in Southern Miss history for a freshman behind Tom Bishop's 404 points in 1949–50, and recorded 280 rebounds, which ranked him second among all Golden Eagles freshmen behind Bill Lundberg's 305 rebounds in the 1959–60 season. Dawson started 25 out of 27 games, ranked third on the team in scoring (12.6 points per game) and led the team in rebounding with 10 per game. On November 29, 1978, Dawson recorded 20 rebounds in a game against Missouri Western. The following season Dawson was the team leader in minutes played, minutes per game, field goal percentage, points per game (18.2) and rebounds per game (10.6). His performance during his sophomore season earned him a second-team All-South Independent selection by the Associated Press.

Dawson's junior year saw him average 15.4 points (second behind Eddie Jiles) and 10.3 rebounds (first); he also led the team in field goal percentage and minutes per game (a career-high 37.5). During the season he reached 1,000 career points on January 10, 1981, against Biscayne, one of the fastest player to reach the mark in Southern Miss history. At the end of the season he was selected as an All-American by Sporting News and was a first-team Associated Press All-Conference selection. In his senior season Dawson averaged 17.2 points, 8.7 rebounds, 35.6 minutes per game (all team-highs) and ended his career with 1,695 total points, which ranked him third all-time (he ranks 4th as of 2019). He was selected for the second year in a row in the All-South Independent first team by the Associated Press, and again was named an All-American by Sporting News. His 1,069 career rebounds rank him 4th all-time.

=== College statistics ===
Year	Team	GP	GS	MPG	FG%	3P%	FT%	RPG	APG	SPG	BPG	PPG
1978–79	Southern Miss	27	25	31.7	.549	–	.716	10.0	1.2	–	–	12.6
1979–80	Southern Miss	27	27	37.1	.615	–	.658	10.6	0.7	1.3	0.3	18.2
1980–81	Southern Miss	27	27	37.5	.578	–	.772	10.3	1.1	1.2	0.4	15.4
1981–82	Southern Miss	26	26	35.6	.583	–	.764	8.7	1.5	1.4	0.3	17.2
Career		107	105	35.5	.584	–	.731	9.9	1.1	1.3	0.3	15.8

== Professional career ==
After the end of his senior season at Southern Miss, Dawson was automatically eligible for the 1982 NBA draft. After going undrafted, he joined the Maine Lumberjacks of the Continental Basketball Association, where he averaged 14.4 points and 8.6 rebounds over 40 games in his first season as a professional player, and was selected as a CBA All-Star. In 1983 he joined the Bay State Bombardiers and he improved his averages to 22.5 points and 11.1 rebounds per game in 35.4 minutes of play, earning another All-Star selection: he also played 5 postseason games, averaging 19.2 points and 7.8 rebounds. He played another season with the Bombardiers in 1984–85, recording career-highs in scoring (25.9) and rebounding (11.9) and led the CBA in steals per game with 2.5. He was selected to the All-CBA First Team in 1984 and 1985 and the All-Defensive First Team in 1985. In 1985 he then joined the Connecticut Colonials, a team from New Haven, Connecticut, and played in the inaugural United States Basketball League season: he ranked 4th in the league in rebounding (9.7 per game) and second in field goal percentage with .571, and was selected in the All-USBL Second Team.

Dawson left the United States for the first time in his career to join Cocodrilos de Caracas, a Venezuelan team: during his time there he recorded 50 double-doubles and was named MVP of the 1986 season. In 1986 he moved to Europe and signed for French club Mulhouse BC: during his only season with the club he LNB Pro A Best Scorer award averaging 35.3 points per game, the highest mark since 1973 (tied with Keith Edmonson's 1986 season).

In 1987 he had his first experience in Israel: he joined Hapoel Holon for the 1987–88 season and in 22 games he averaged 24.9 points. In 1988 he went back to France and signed for second division club Évreux: he averaged 31.2 points and 8.3 rebounds in 26 games, playing 37.6 minutes per game; he also shot 39.7% from the three-point line and 82.8% from the free throw line. In 1990 he moved to Israel again and played 10 games with Beitar Tel Aviv, averaging 28.8 points, 9.5 rebounds and 2.3 assists. In 1991 he also played for the Memphis Rockers of the World Basketball League, and was named in the All-WBL first team.

In 1991 Dawson signed for Hapoel Eilat, and in the 1991–92 season he led the league in both scoring and rebounding, averaging 27.5 points and 10.7 rebounds per game while shooting 71% from the field and 84% from the free throw line. He was named the 1992 Israeli Basketball Premier League MVP. He stayed with Hapoel for the following two seasons, and in 1993–94 again averaged a double-double with 23.9 points and 10.2 rebounds per game. In 1994 he signed with Maccabi Jerusalem, and in his first season he averaged 21.7 points and 8.2 rebounds, and in the following year he recorded 18.6 points and 7.3 rebounds per game. In 1996 he went back to Eilat and joined Hapoel for the second time in his career, playing for the team until 1998.

In 1998 he signed for Maccabi Rishon LeZion, for which he played 3 seasons from 1998 until 2001. He then changed 5 teams in his last 7 years of professional career, playing for Hapoel Holon, Hapoel Jerusalem, Maccabi Ashdod, Ironi Ramat Gan and finally Ironi Nes Ziona, where he ended his career at the age of 48.

== Personal life ==
In 1992 he married an Israeli national and acquired Israeli citizenship. He is the father of Shawn Dawson, a professional basketball player born when he lived in Eilat, playing for local team Hapoel Eilat.
