= Andre Turner =

American basketball player (born 1964)

Memphis Tigers
- Title: Director of Player Development/Alumni & Community Relations
- League: American Athletic Conference

Personal information
- Born: December 13, 1964 (age 61) Memphis, Tennessee, U.S.
- Listed height: 5 ft 11 in (1.80 m)
- Listed weight: 177 lb (80 kg)

Career information
- High school: Mitchell (Memphis, Tennessee)
- College: Memphis (1982–1986)
- NBA draft: 1986: 3rd round, 69th overall pick
- Drafted by: Los Angeles Lakers
- Playing career: 1986–2008
- Position: Point guard
- Number: 7, 13, 11, 12, 10, 4, 1
- Coaching career: 2010–present

Career history

Playing
- 1986: Tampa Bay Flash
- 1986–1987: Rockford Lightning
- 1986: Boston Celtics
- 1987: La Crosse Catbirds
- 1987: Rhode Island Gulls
- 1987–1988: Houston Rockets
- 1988: Miami Tropics
- 1988: Calgary 88s
- 1988–1989: La Crosse Catbirds
- 1989: Milwaukee Bucks
- 1989–1990: La Crosse Catbirds
- 1989: Los Angeles Clippers
- 1989: Charlotte Hornets
- 1990: La Crosse Catbirds
- 1990: Memphis Rockers
- 1990–1991: Philadelphia 76ers
- 1991–1992: Memphis Rockers
- 1991: Washington Bullets
- 1992–1994: Ourense
- 1994–1996: Zaragoza
- 1996–1998: Joventut
- 1998–2001: Sevilla
- 2001–2002: Cáceres
- 2003: Universidad Complutense
- 2003–2004: Valladolid
- 2004–2005: Murcia
- 2005: Joventut
- 2005–2006: Melilla
- 2006: Minorca
- 2007: La Palma
- 2007–2008: Zaragoza 2002

Coaching
- 2010–2015: Mitchell HS (assistant)
- 2015–2021: Mitchell HS
- 2021–2024: Lane

Career highlights
- As player: Spanish King's Cup winner (1997); Spanish King's Cup MVP (1997); 6× Spanish League All-Star (1992–1994, 1997–1999); CBA champion (1990); CBA Playoff MVP (1990); CBA All-Star (1988); USBL champion (1986); All-USBL First Team (1988); USBL All-Defensive Team (1988); All-WBL Team (1989); AP honorable mention All-American (1986); 2× First-team All-Metro Conference (1985, 1986); Metro Conference All-Freshman Team (1983)
- Stats at NBA.com
- Stats at Basketball Reference

Andre Devalle Turner (born December 13, 1964) is an American former professional basketball player who played in the National Basketball Association (NBA). He is currently on the basketball staff at Memphis after three seasons as head coach at Lane College. A 5'11", 177 lb (80 kg) point guard, he played collegiately at Memphis State University (now the University of Memphis). Born in Memphis, Tennessee, his nickname in college was the "Little General".

== College career ==
The shining moment of Andre Turner's career was in his junior season, when he, along with teammates Keith Lee, Baskerville Holmes, and William Bedford made it to the Final Four, on the strength of three consecutive game winning shots by Turner.

The first was in an overtime win against UAB. Ironically, Gene Bartow was UAB's head coach, the last coach to lead Memphis State to the Final Four, eventually losing in the 1973 championship game against UCLA.

The second game winner came against Boston College, and the third, coming against the University of Oklahoma, propelled the Tigers back to the Final Four, only to lose to eventual champ Villanova, one of three Big East teams in the Final Four that year.

=== College statistics ===
Legend
GP	Games played	GS	Games started	MPG	Minutes per game
FG%	Field goal percentage	3P%	3-point field goal percentage	FT%	Free throw percentage
RPG	Rebounds per game	APG	Assists per game	SPG	Steals per game
BPG	Blocks per game	PPG	Points per game	**Bold**	Career high

Year	Team	GP	GS	MPG	FG%	3P%	FT%	RPG	APG	SPG	BPG	PPG
1982–83	Memphis	31	-	32.5	**.518**	-	.806	1.1	4.1	2.4	**0.1**	9.9
1983–84	Memphis	33	-	31.9	.457	-	.667	1.4	4.5	1.8	**0.1**	8.2
1984–85	Memphis	**34**	-	**34.0**	.498	-	.714	**2.3**	6.6	1.6	**0.1**	11.4
1985–86	Memphis	**34**	-	33.4	.478	-	**.854**	2.0	**7.7**	**2.6**	**0.1**	**13.9**
Career		132	-	33.0	.487	-	.757	1.7	5.8	2.1	0.1	10.9

== Professional career ==
Turner was selected in the third round of the 1986 NBA draft by the Los Angeles Lakers, but traded to the Boston Celtics. He played for seven teams in the NBA: the Boston Celtics, Houston Rockets, Milwaukee Bucks, Los Angeles Clippers, Charlotte Hornets, Philadelphia 76ers, and Washington Bullets. In 170 games with these seven teams, he holds career averages of 4.1 points, 1.5 rebounds, and 1.5 assists per game. His most productive year was in 1990–91, when he averaged 5.9 points and 4.4 assists in 70 games for the Philadelphia 76ers. Turner also played in the Continental Basketball Association for the La Crosse Catbirds, where he led the team to the 1989–1990 CBA Championship, and in the World Basketball League for the Memphis Rockers.

After leaving the NBA, he played professionally in Spain. In 1997, while playing with Joventut Badalona, Turner won the Spanish King's Cup title and the tournament's MVP award. With Sevilla, he played in the European-wide top-tier level EuroLeague, in the 1999–00 season.

== NBA career statistics ==
Legend
GP	Games played	GS	Games started	MPG	Minutes per game
FG%	Field goal percentage	3P%	3-point field goal percentage	FT%	Free throw percentage
RPG	Rebounds per game	APG	Assists per game	SPG	Steals per game
BPG	Blocks per game	PPG	Points per game	**Bold**	Career high

=== Regular season ===
Year	Team	GP	GS	MPG	FG%	3P%	FT%	RPG	APG	SPG	BPG	PPG
1986–87	Boston	3	0	6.0	.400	.000	.000	0.7	0.3	0.0	0.0	1.3
1987–88	Houston	12	0	8.3	.353	.143	.714	0.7	1.9	0.6	**0.1**	2.9
1988–89	Milwaukee	4	0	3.3	**.500**	.000	.000	0.8	0.0	0.5	0.0	1.5
1989–90	Los Angeles	3	0	10.3	.154	.000	.000	1.7	1.0	0.3	0.0	1.3
1989–90	Charlotte	8	0	10.5	.360	.000	**1.000**	0.4	2.5	**0.9**	0.0	2.8
1990–91	Philadelphia	**70**	1	**20.1**	.439	**.364**	.736	**2.2**	**4.4**	**0.9**	0.0	**5.9**
1991–92	Washington	**70**	**3**	12.4	.425	.063	.792	1.3	2.5	0.8	0.0	4.1
Career		170	4	14.8	.422	.237	.764	1.5	3.1	0.8	0.0	4.5

=== Playoffs ===
Year	Team	GP	GS	MPG	FG%	3P%	FT%	RPG	APG	SPG	BPG	PPG
1991	Philadelphia	8	0	23.6	.438	.333	.813	1.6	4.4	1.4	0.0	7.3

== Coaching career ==
Turner was an assistant basketball coach at Mitchell High in Memphis for four years before being named head coach in 2015. The school, won three state championships during his time there, in 2014, 2015 and 2016.

On April 15, 2021, Turner was named head coach for Division II Lane College of the Southern Intercollegiate Athletic Conference (SIAC).
