= John Strickland (basketball) =

American basketball and streetball player

John “The Franchise” Strickland a.k.a. “Strick” (May 20, 1970 — October 6, 2010) was a former professional basketball and a storied streetball player. He was born in the Bronx but grew up in Washington Heights NYC where he began to establish a name for himself for his showmanship and low-post skills.

He left the east coast to play basketball at Hawaii Pacific University where he averaged a double-double each season until 1995. He went on to play at the USBL from 1995 to 2000 for 6 seasons where he averaged 22 points per game. He went on to play for the Brooklyn Wanderers and then moved mid-season to Albany Patroons of the CBA. In 2008, he was a CBA All Star. During this time he was also playing overseas. He played predominately in Dominican Republic, but also, South Korea, Italy, and other countries. While he was always on the move, he always returned to NYC for summer leagues where he continued to build his legacy as a streetball legend.

During the 2008–09 and 2009–2010 seasons Strickland played for the Halifax Rainmen who were part of the PBL at the time. He retired with the Rainmen and was promoted to Director of Basketball Development. It was around this time when he was found dead on October 6 at the age of 38.

He was mourned openly online by many, including celebrities LeBron James and rapper Jay-Z who knew Strick from his NYC streetball days. Jay-Z, quotes Strickland in a verse from his 2003 hit Public Service Announcement: “No one can do it better. I check cheddar like a food inspector. My homey Strick told me, ‘Dude, finish your breakfast.’”

== Media ==
He was mentioned in the Jay-Z song "Public Service Announcement" with the lyric "No one can do it better. I check cheddar like a food inspector. My homey Strick told me, ‘Dude, finish your breakfast.'” As a streetball player, it was alleged that Strickland played in drug money fueled games.
