= Wyoming Wildcatters =

American basketball team

- Division: Western (1982–88)
- League: CBA
- Established: 1982
- Folded: 1988
- Arena: Casper Events Center
- Capacity: 8,842
- Location: Casper, Wyoming
- Team colors: red, white, blue
- Team manager: Jeff Gordon

The Wyoming Wildcatters were a professional basketball team based in Casper, Wyoming. They played six seasons in the Continental Basketball Association (CBA), the defunct development league for the National Basketball Association (NBA). They managed to reach the CBA finals twice, in 1984 and in 1988, losing to the Albany Patroons on both occasions.

== History ==
In the early 1980s, CBA commissioner Jim Drucker was aiming to expand the league by adding new teams: one of the cities he was most interested in, mainly for geographical reasons, was Casper. In March 1982 the new CBA team was founded: the owners announced the name "Wyoming Wildcatters" on March 17, 1982, and appointed Jeff Gordon as the general manager. Five other expansion franchises joined the CBA for the season: the Albany Patroons, the Detroit Spirits, the Ohio Mixers, the Reno Bighorns, and the Wisconsin Flyers. The team started to search for a head coach, and after 3 months of search they hired Jack Schalow, an NBA scout who had worked as a college coach at Morehead State and Seattle. In the month of November 1982 the Wildcatters held pre-season free agent camps to select new players for their roster. The final roster for the 1982–83 included Earl Belcher, Roylin "Boot" Bond, Reggie Hannah, Angelo Hill, David Magley, Anthony Martin, Tony Martin, Anthony Roberts, Mike Schultz, Tyrone Shoulders, Jim Smith, Rocky Smith and Charles Thompson. The Wildcatters played their first game on December 3, 1982 at the Yellowstone METRA in Billings, Montana against the Billings Volcanos, winning the game 137-123. On December 7, 1982 the team played their first home game against the Montana Golden Nuggets. The Wildcatters had a good first season, and finished at the second place in the Western Division with a .500 record (22-22), reaching the division finals against the Montana Golden Nuggets: they lost the series 3-1. Charles Thompson was the team leading scorer with a 25.9 points per game average, while Mike Schultz was the top rebounder with 9.3 rebounds per game. Guard Anthony Martin recorded the best assists average with 4.7.

The 1983–84 season was one of the most successful for the franchise: the addition of guard Del Beshore was pivotal for the team's improvement, as he contributed with 15.7 points, 8.8 assists and a league-best 3.2 steals per game; Anthony Roberts led the team in scoring with a 25.2 average, and newly acquired Dave Johnson recorded a team best 8.0 rebounds per game. After finishing in the third place in the Western Division, the Wildcatters won the division semifinals against the defending champions, the Detroit Spirits (3-1), and also won the division finals against the Wisconsin Flyers (3-1), thus reaching the CBA finals. The Wildcatters had home advantage, playing the first game at the Casper Events Center, but they lost to the Albany Patroons 129-121. The series went back and forth, with the teams alternating wins: the Wildcatters won the second game 128-126; Albany won the third 120-111; and again the Wildcatters put the series 2-2 with a 128-112 win. The final game saw the Patroons winning 119-109 and winning the CBA title. Willie "Hutch" Jones averaged 20.5 points and 8.9 rebounds in postseason play, while Beshore recorded 9.8 assists per game. The season also saw the first Wildcatters player to receive an individual award: Anthony Roberts won the MVP award at the All-Star game, which saw the Wildcatters playing against the CBA All-Stars in Casper.

By 1984–85, the Wildcatters had created ties with three colleges (Brigham Young, Utah and Wyoming) and were associated with two NBA teams, the Phoenix Suns and the Seattle SuperSonics. The team acquired forwards Sam Mosley and Rick Lamb, who were two of the best players in the roster (Mosley averaged a double-double with 20.0 points and 11.5 rebounds), and former NBA player Larry Kenon tried to make a comeback after 1 year of inactivity; he only played 7 games for the Wildcatters, averaging 3.6 points per game. Again the Wildcatters experienced considerable success, and won the Western Division title with a .500 record (24-24). However, despite good performances in the playoffs by Boot Bond and Rick Lamb, they lost in the division semifinals against Wisconsin. Del Beshore continued his leadership at the point guard position and led the league in assists, averaging 10.0 per game. For the second season in a row a Wildcatters player was appointed the All-Star game MVP: this time it was Rick Lamb who received the award.

Coach Schalow left the team after the end of the 1984–85 season, and in June the franchise started looking for a new coach, focusing on Wisconsin Flyers coach Bill Klucas, who had already declared that he was going to leave the team. Klucas was officially appointed as the Wildcatters' new coach, and started the preseason training in November the roster was heavily changed for the new season, and many players who had built the team success in the previous years left the team. Among the few who remained were Boot Bond, Michael Jackson and forward Sam Mosley, who only played 1 game. Forward John Drew scored a franchise-record 1,241 points during the 1985–86 season, but the team performance worsened significantly, and the team finished with a .438 record (21-27), failing to make the playoffs for the first time in franchise history.

In June 1986, Cazzie Russell was appointed as the new head coach, after Klucas' contract was not renewed. The Wildcatters acquired guard Aubrey Sherrod, one of the draftees in the 1985 NBA draft who had played for the Kansas City Sizzlers during the previous season, forward Juden Smith, a UTEP standout who was a 3rd round pick in the 1986 NBA draft, Brad Wright and Perry Young. Despite the addition of these players, the team did not improve and finished with the same record of the previous season, again missing the playoffs, with the last place in the Western Division.

In 1987, the franchise was in financial trouble. Despite the issues off the court, the team played well and won several games in the beginning of the season, but the financial issues were too severe and forced team owner John O'Donnell to leave his position on March 1, 1988: the club was managed by the CBA until the end of the season. The team lost 20 of the last 23 games played, but managed to qualify for the playoffs: they defeated the La Crosse Catbirds in 7 games in the Western Division semifinals, and won the division finals against the Rockford Lightning 4 games to 2 after a 4th-overtime 137-134 game 6 win in Rockford. The Wildcatters thus reached the CBA finals, where again they had to face the Albany Patroons. The team was leading the series 3-2, but lost both games 6 (102-81) and the decisive game 7 (105-96), and lost the title to the Patroons. The franchise ceased operations after that final game.

== Season-by-season records ==
Years	Wins	Losses	Winning percentage	Head coach(s)	Ref
1982–83	22	22	.500	Jack Schalow	
1983–84	23	21	.523	Jack Schalow	
1984–85	24	24	.500	Jack Schalow	
1985–86	21	27	.438	Bill Klucas	
1986–87	21	27	.438	Cazzie Russell	
1987–88	23	31	.426	Cazzie Russell	

== All-time roster ==
- David Allen
- Larry Anderson
- Rick Anderson
- Brett Applegate
- Earl Belcher
- Del Beshore
- Freeman Blade
- Roylin "Boot" Bond
- Charles Bradley
- Ron Cavenall
- Greg Cook
- John Copeland
- B. B. Davis
- Marvin Delph
- Billy Donovan
- John Drew
- Chris Engler
- Chuck Everson
- Alvin Franklin
- Gary Furniss
- Chris Galloway
- Thad Garner
- Lionel Garrett
- Luster Goodwin
- Michael Graham
- Tony Guy
- Ray Hall
- Reggie Hannah
- Tom Haywood
- Johnny High
- Jo Jo Hunter
- Michael Jackson
- Dave Johnson
- Willie "Hutch" Jones
- Eddie Jordan
- Larry Kenon
- Rick Lamb
- Todd Linder
- Dave Magley
- Anthony Martin
- Tony Martin
- Bryce McPhee
- Barry Mitchell
- Keith Morrison
- Sam Mosley
- Kenny Natt
- Clayton Olivier
- Joe Onyekwelu
- Mike Phelps
- Paul Phifer
- Orlando Phillips
- David Pope
- Mark Radford
- Dwayne Randall
- Richard Rellford
- Anthony Roberts
- Ken Roper
- Tim Ruff
- Mike Schultz
- Aubrey Sherrod
- Tyrone Shoulders
- Jim Smith
- Juden Smith
- Rocky Smith
- Andre Spencer
- Terence Stansbury
- Alex Stivrins
- Emmett Taylor
- Charles Thompson
- Bonner Upshaw
- Vince Washington
- Brad Wright
- A. J. Wynder
- Danny Young
- Perry Young

== Awards ==
- CBA assists leader: Del Beshore (1984–85)
- CBA steals leader: Del Beshore (1983–84)
- CBA blocks leader: Ron Cavenall (1987–88)
- CBA All-Star game MVP: Anthony Roberts (1984), Rick Lamb (1985)
