= Ronnie Steine =

American politician

Ronnie Steine was the fifth vice mayor of Nashville, Tennessee, from 1999 until he resigned in 2002 after he admitted he had twice been arrested for shoplifting. He was also a candidate for Tennessee's 5th congressional district. In September 2007, Steine won an at-large seat in the Metro Council.

== Education and career ==
From 1991 until 1999, Steine was a councilman-at-large in the Metro Council. In 1999, he served as vice mayor and presided over the legislative body until his departure in 2002. He had been a candidate for the race to replace Bob Clement as a member of the United States House of Representatives for Tennessee's 5th congressional district, until he withdrew from the race in April 2002. He admitted to shoplifting a pack of football trading cards from a local Target store in 2001. After the incident, he also resigned as vice mayor. On September 11, 2007, Steine won an election for a Metro Council at-large seat, placing third with 43,290 votes.

Steine obtained a bachelor's degree from Vanderbilt University and later earned a J.D. from Vanderbilt University Law School. From 1995 until 2001, he served as executive director of the Oasis Center, a local nonprofit organization that provides crisis, counseling and leadership development services to at-risk youth. He is a former president of the Davidson County Democratic Party.

== Political views ==
On his campaign website, Steine stated that one of his priorities as councilman-at-large would be to increase the number of police and firefighters in Davidson County and to ensure they have the best in equipment, technology and training. In January 1998, Steine co-sponsored a bill that asked permission to waive a state law that banned cities from regulating smoking in public places, opining that the issue should be decided by individual cities and not the state.

Preceded by Jay West	Vice Mayor of Nashville; President of the Metro Council; 1999–2002	Succeeded by Howard Gentry, Jr.
