= Pittsburgh Piranhas =

- League: Continental Basketball Association; 1994–1995
- Founded: 1994
- Folded: 1995
- History: Louisville Catbirds; 1983–1985; La Crosse Catbirds 1985–1994; Pittsburgh Piranhas 1994–1995
- Arena: A.J. Palumbo Center
- Capacity: 3,500
- Location: Pittsburgh, Pennsylvania
- Team colors: Orange, purple
- Head coach: Don Zierden
- Ownership: Bob Murphy
- Championships: 0
Home	Away

The Pittsburgh Piranhas was a semi-pro basketball team that began in 1994 as part of the Continental Basketball Association (CBA). The team played its home games at the A.J. Palumbo Center at Duquesne University in Pittsburgh. From 1983 to 1985 the Piranhas were known as the Louisville Catbirds and then the La Crosse Catbirds from 1985 until moving to Pittsburgh in 1994. During their first year in Pittsburgh, the Piranhas made it to the CBA Championship. The team was defeated in a best of seven series against the Yakima Sun Kings.

The team lasted one season.

== 1994-95 Playoffs ==
Opponent	Series
Rockford	3-2
Chicago	3-0
Yakima	2-4
