= Memphis Rockers =

Defunct American basketball franchise

The Memphis Rockers were a professional basketball franchise based in Memphis, Tennessee from 1990 to 1991. The team played its inaugural seasons in the World Basketball League before folding.

John Starks played for the team before becoming an NBA All-Star. Other notable players: Vincent Askew, Andre Turner, David Rivers, and Joe Dawson.

The Rockers played their home games at the Mid-South Coliseum.

== Season by season record ==
Season	GP	W	L	Pct.	GB	Finish	Playoffs
1990	46	27	19	.587	11	5th WBL	Won WBL First Round 2–1 Vs Illinois Express, Lost WBL Semi Finals 2–1 vs Youngstown Pride
1991	51	29	22	.569	7	3rd WBL Southern Division	Lost WBL First Round 2–1 Vs Florida Jades
Totals	97	56	41	.577	–	–	–
