= Las Vegas Silver Streaks =

- League: World Basketball League
- History: Las Vegas Silver Streaks; 1988–1990; Nashville Stars; 1991–1992
- Arena: Thomas & Mack Center
- Capacity: 17,923
- General manager: Fred Kuenzi (1988)
- Ownership: Bill Yuill and World Basketball League (1988–1989); Rick Kulis (40%) and World Basketball League (60%) (1990–1991)
- Championships: 1 1988

The Las Vegas Silver Streaks were a professional basketball franchise based in Las Vegas, Nevada from 1988-1990. The team played its inaugural seasons in the World Basketball League before folding. The Silver Streaks won the first World Basketball League championship in 1988, defeating the Chicago Express 102-95 in the title game. They were one of only three teams to ever win a WBL championship. Creation of a league franchise team for Las Vegas, NV was facilitated by former Oakland A's executive Fred Kuenzi. He stayed on and served as a General Manager and promotions director for season 1.

The Silver Streaks played its home games at the Thomas & Mack Center. Former UNLV stars Freddie Banks, Anthony Jones and Mark Wade played for the club.

Prior to the 1991 season, the Silver Steaks relocated to Nashville, Tennessee and became the Nashville Stars.

== Season by season record ==
Season	GP	W	L	Pct.	GB	Finish	Playoffs
1988	54	32	22	.593	–	2nd WBL	Won WBL Semi Finals 105–103 Vs Youngstown Pride, Won WBL Championship 102–95 Vs Chicago Express
1989	44	26	18	.591	5	4th WBL	Lost WBL Semi Finals 2–1 Vs Calgary 88's
1990	46	32	14	.696	6	2nd WBL	Won WBL First Round 2–0 Vs Saskatchewan Storm, Lost WBL Semi Finals 2–1 Vs Calgary 88's
Totals	144	90	54	.625	–	–	Playoff record 6–4

== Sources ==
- http://www.apbr.org/wbl88-92.html
