= Charleston Gunners (2011) =

Premier Basketball League team based in Charleston, West Virginia

- Founded: 2011
- League: Premier Basketball League
- Team history: Charleston Gunners (2012)
- Based in: Montgomery, West Virginia
- Arena: Neal Baisi Athletic Center
- Colors: Blue, white, gold
- Owner: Thomas Jones
- Head coach: Wayne Casey

The Charleston Gunners were a Premier Basketball League team based in Charleston, West Virginia. The Gunners played their home games on the campus of West Virginia University Institute of Technology in Montgomery.

The Gunners were named to honor Charleston's former Continental Basketball Association team of the same name which moved from Sarasota, Florida (where they were called the Sarasota Stingers) in 1986, remaining in Charleston until moving to Columbus, Ohio in 1989, becoming the Columbus Horizon.

On January 26, 2012, the Charleston Gunners were released from the league due to failure to Adhere League Standards. They played only 4 games before they were released.
