= Illinois Express =

- League: World Basketball League
- Founded: 1989
- Folded: 1990
- History: Chicago Express (1988); Illinois Express (1989–1990)
- Arena: Prairie Capital Convention Center
- Location: Springfield, Illinois
- Head coach: Dave Robisch

The Illinois Express coached by Dave Robisch was a professional basketball franchise based in Springfield, Illinois from 1989-1990. The team played its inaugural seasons in the World Basketball League before folding.

The Express played its home games at the Prairie Capital Convention Center.

== Season by season record ==
Season	GP	W	L	Pct.	GBL	Finish	Playoffs
1989	44	29	15	.659	2	3rd in WBL	Lost 2-0 in the WBL Semi finals to the Youngstown Pride
1990	46	27	19	.587	11	4th in WBL	Lost 2-1 in the WBL first Round to the Memphis Rockers
Totals	90	56	34	.622	–	–	1–4 Playoff record
