= Chicago Express (basketball team) =

Defunct basketball team

The Chicago Express was a professional basketball franchise based in Chicago, Illinois. The team was one of the original franchises of the World Basketball League, which began play in 1988. The Express advanced to the WBL championship game in 1988, losing to the Las Vegas Silver Streaks 102–95 on September 9, 1988.

After the 1988 season, the franchise moved to Springfield, Illinois and played two more seasons as the Illinois Express before folding for good in late 1990.

While in Chicago, the Express played its home games at the Rosemont Horizon.

== Notable players ==
- Larry Jordan

== Season by season record ==
Season	GP	W	L	Pct.	GB	Finish	Playoffs
1988	54	27	27	.500	5	4th WBL	Won WBL Semi Finals 109–107 Vs Calgary 88's, Lost WBL Championship 102–95 Vs Las Vegas Silver Streaks
Totals	54	27	27	.500	–	–	1–1 Playoff Record

== Sources ==
- "WBL Express signs Jordan". Chicago Sun-Times. April 19, 1988. Archived from the original on November 5, 2012 – via HighBeam Research.
