= Chip Engelland =

American basketball player & coach (born 1961)

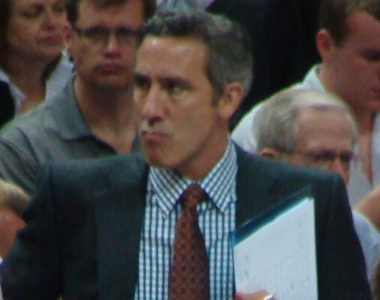
- Engelland in 2011

Houston Rockets
- Position: Assistant coach
- League: NBA

Personal information
- Born: May 9, 1961 (age 65) Pacific Palisades, California, U.S.
- Listed height: 6 ft 4 in (1.93 m)
- Listed weight: 175 lb (79 kg)

Career information
- High school: Palisades (Pacific Palisades, California)
- College: Duke (1979–1983)
- NBA draft: 1983: undrafted
- Playing career: 1984–1992

Career history

Playing
- 1984–1986: Northern Cement
- 1986–1988: Topeka Sizzlers
- 1989: Columbus Horizon
- 1989–1990: San Jose Jammers
- 1988–1992: Calgary 88's

Coaching
- 1999–2000: Detroit Pistons (assistant)
- 2003–2005: Denver Nuggets (assistant)
- 2005–2022: San Antonio Spurs (assistant)
- 2022–2026: Oklahoma City Thunder (assistant)
- 2026– Present: Houston Rockets (assistant)

Career highlights
- As player: PBA champion (1985 Reinforced); PBA scoring champion (1984); As assistant coach: 3× NBA champion (2007, 2014, 2025)
Medals
Men's basketball
Representing Philippines
William Jones Cup
Gold medal – first place	1985 Taiwan	Team

Arthur Edward "Chip" Engelland III (born May 9, 1961) is an American basketball coach and former professional player. He is currently an assistant coach for the Houston Rockets of the National Basketball Association (NBA).

== Career ==
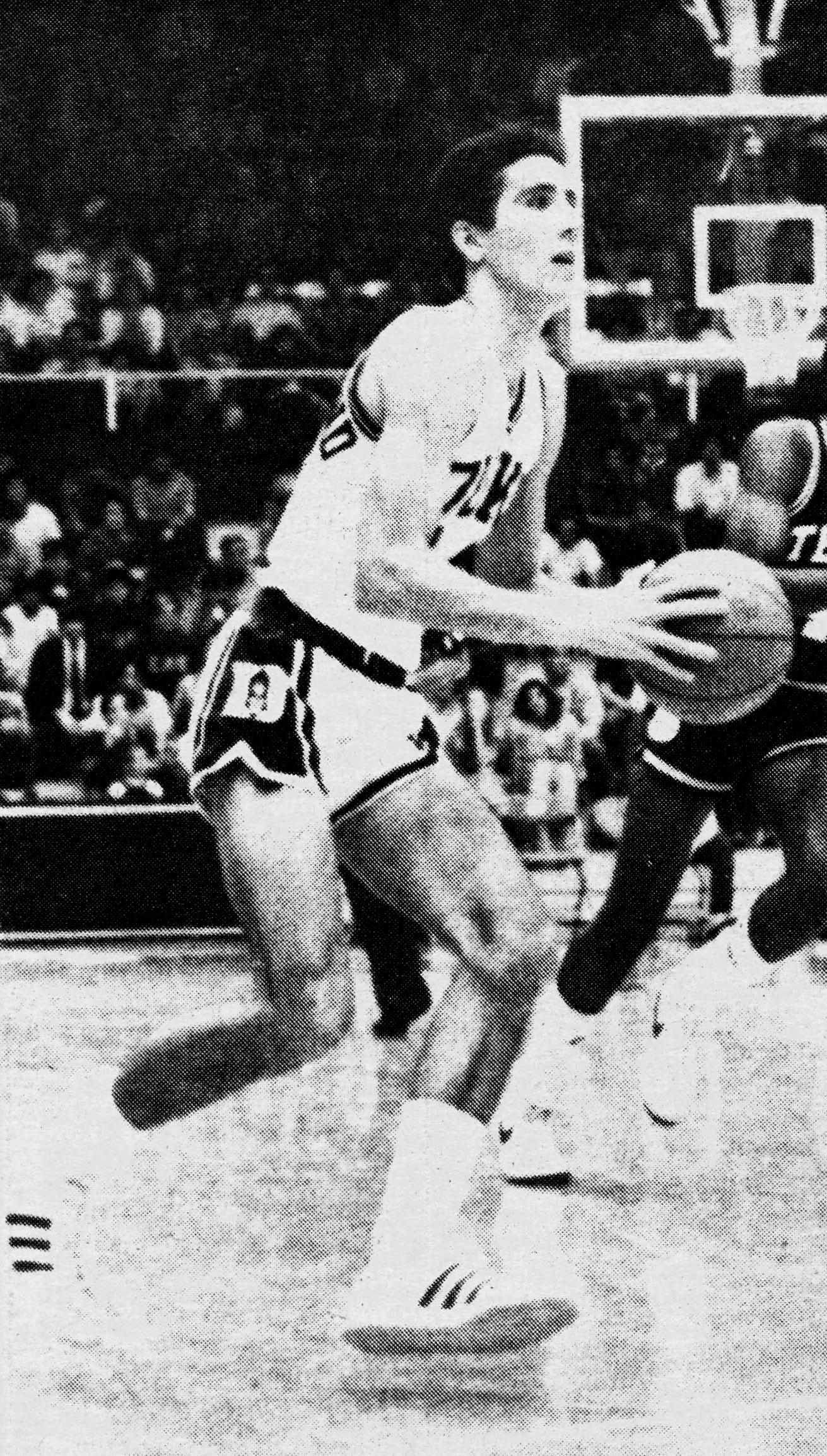
Engelland playing for Duke in 1983

A native of Los Angeles, Engelland, who also served as a ball boy for coach John Wooden's NCAA champions UCLA Bruins in 1975, began his basketball career at Pacific Palisades High School, leading Los Angeles in scoring as a senior in 1979. Subsequently, he lettered four seasons at Duke University, scoring more than 1,000 points for coach Mike Krzyzewski's Blue Devils and being named the team's captain in his senior year.

After graduating from Duke in 1983, Engelland went on to play professionally for nine years. First in the Philippines, he became a naturalized Filipino citizen where he spent two seasons and was a member of the Philippine national basketball team under the sponsorship of Northern Cement Corporation that captured the 1985 Jones Cup Championship, then back in North America, playing for the Topeka Sizzlers of the Continental Basketball Association (CBA) and the Calgary 88's of the World Basketball League (WBL). He was known by Filipino fans as "the Machine Gun" for his superb shooting skills.

In 1993, Engelland started his coaching career, introducing his basketball camps Chip Shots with the aim of helping players of all ages improve their shooting skills; two years later he founded the In-Net Corporation, strengthening his reputation as a clinician and advisor. He got his first job in the National Basketball Association (NBA) in the 1999–2000 season, serving as a shooting consultant for the Detroit Pistons. Three years later, he signed with the Denver Nuggets as the director of player development, holding the position for two seasons. Engelland served as an assistant coach for the San Antonio Spurs starting from the 2005–06 season, and won two championships with the Spurs in 2007 and 2014. In 2022, Engelland signed as an assistant coach for the Oklahoma City Thunder, where he works today. He joined the Houston Rockets as an assistant coach and shooting specialist.

== Personal life ==
Engelland is married to Jessica Grunow of Troy, Michigan. They have two sons, Press and Path.
