= Erie Wave =

American basketball team

- League: World Basketball League
- Founded: 1990
- Folded: 1992
- Arena: Louis J. Tullio Arena
- Capacity: 6,982
- Location: Erie, Pennsylvania
- Team colors: Royal blue, light blue, red, white
- Head coach: Bill Kalbaugh

The Erie Wave was a professional basketball franchise based in Erie, Pennsylvania from 1990 to 1992. The team played in the World Basketball League, which folded before the conclusion of the 1992 schedule.

The Wave cheerleading squad was known as the "Eriesistibles".

The Wave played its home games at the Louis J. Tullio Arena.

== Season by season record ==
Season	GP	W	L	Pct.	GB	Finish	Playoffs
1990	46	12	34	.261	26	7th WBL	Lost WBL First Round 2–0 Vs Calgary 88's
1991	51	18	33	.353	19	5th WBL Northern Division	Did Not Qualify
1992	28	12	16	.429	–	9th WBL	Team Disbands on July 20, 1992
Totals	125	42	83	.336	–	–	Playoff record 0–2

== Sources ==
- History of The World Basketball League | apbr.org
