= La Crosse Catbirds =

- League: CBA 1990–2008
- Founded: 1983
- Folded: 1995
- History: Louisville Catbirds; 1983–1985; La Crosse Catbirds; 1985–1994; Pittsburgh Piranhas; 1994–1995
- Arena: La Crosse Center
- Location: La Crosse, Wisconsin, United States
- Head coach: Flip Saunders
- Championships: 2 (1990, 1992)

The La Crosse Catbirds was an American basketball team based in La Crosse, Wisconsin and member of the Continental Basketball Association (CBA). The Catbirds were the 1990 and 1992 CBA champions. The team moved to La Crosse from Louisville in 1985, and left La Crosse for Pittsburgh in May 1994. La Crosse would see the CBA return in 1995 when the La Crosse Bobcats took to the court.

Widely known as the training ground for future NBA coach Flip Saunders, who led the team to both championships.

Several future and previous NBA players played for the Catbirds, including Kenny Battle, Russell Cross, Mark Davis, Derrick Gervin, Jaren Jackson, Kevin Lynch, Dennis Nutt, David Rivers, Elliot Perry and Andre Turner.

== Season by season ==
Season	Division	Finish	Games	Wins	Losses	Pct.	Postseason Results
La Crosse Catbirds
1985–86	Western	4th	48	24	24	.500	Won Division Semifinals (Detroit) 4-3; Won Division Finals (Cincinnati) 4-2; Lost Championship Series (Tampa Bay) 4-1
1986–87	Western	1st	48	28	20	.583	Lost Division Semifinals (Rockford) 4-3
1987–88	Western	1st	54	40	14	.741	Lost Division Semifinals (Wyoming) 4-2
1988–89	Western	5th	54	19	35	.352	
1989–90	Central	1st	56	42	14	.750	Won Conference Semifinals (Quad City) 3-0; Won Conference Finals (Albany) 4-3; Won Championship Series (Rapid City) 4-1
1990–91	Central	2nd	56	32	24	.571	Lost Conference First Round (Quad City) 3-2
1991–92	Midwest	2nd	56	40	16	.714	Won Conference Second Round (Grand Rapids) 3-1; Won Conference Finals (Quad City) 3-2; Won Championship Series (Rapid City) 4-3
1992–93	Mideast	3rd	56	32	24	.571	Lost Conference First Round (Rockford) 3-2
1993–94	Mideast	1st	56	35	21	.625	Won Conference First Round (Rockford) 3-0; Lost Conference Finals (Quad City) 3-0
Regular season total			484	292	192	.603	1985–1994
Playoffs total			78	42	36	.538	1985–1994

== Notable players ==
- Brad Leaf
