= Lawton-Fort Sill Cavalry =

American professional basketball team

- Founded: 1990
- League: CBA 1990–1997; CBA 2007–2009; PBL 2009–2011
- Team history: Oklahoma City Cavalry; 1990–1997; Oklahoma Cavalry; 2007–2008; Lawton-Fort Sill Cavalry; 2008–2011
- Based in: Lawton, Oklahoma
- Arena: Great Plains Coliseum
- Colors: blue, white
- Head coach: Micheal Ray Richardson
- Championships: 4 (CBA: 1997, 2008, 2009; PBL: 2010)
- Dancers: Cavalry Dance Team
- Mascot: Crash

Uniforms
Home	Away

The Lawton-Fort Sill Cavalry was a professional basketball team based in Lawton, Oklahoma. They played in the Premier Basketball League (PBL) after having been in the Continental Basketball Association (CBA). They have one PBL championship and also were the two-time champions of the CBA. The original team was known as the Oklahoma City Cavalry, which competed in the CBA in Oklahoma City from 1990 to 1997 – when they were league champions.

The new Oklahoma Cavalry, which was originally supposed to be a reincarnation of the original team and called the Oklahoma City Cavalry, began play in 2007. The team was originally scheduled to play in the American Basketball Association. The team wanted to play at Abe Lemons Arena on the campus of Oklahoma City University; however, the university backed out. Due to the lack of support from Oklahoma City and city officials' desire for a permanent NBA franchise, the owners decided to look elsewhere to place the new Cavalry franchise. The team then decided to move operations to Lawton, Oklahoma, and to play at the Great Plains Coliseum.

Less than one year later, Oklahoma City got their NBA team, the Oklahoma City Thunder.

== Head coach ==
The team was coached by Micheal Ray Richardson. Richardson was a former Albany Patroons coach and was fired for his offensive comments using Jewish stereotypes in the first year. Cliff Levingston was hired as the new coach. After an ownership change during the season, Richardson was rehired.

== 2007–2008 season ==
In their inaugural season, the Cavs compiled a 30–18 record and made the playoffs as the No. 2 seed in the Western Conference. Following an upset win in the Western Conference championship game over the two-time defending CBA champion Yakima Sun Kings, the Cavalry earned a bid in the CBA Finals against the Eastern Conference champion Minot SkyRockets, where they won the series three games to two.

Starting with the CBA Finals, the team changed its name to the Lawton-Fort Sill Cavalry to better associate the team with the city they play in.

== 2008–2009 season ==
Due to economic hardships, the 2008–2009 CBA season was shortened to February 3. The best of 3 CBA Finals pitted the No. 2 seeded Albany Patroons against the No. 1 seeded Lawton-Fort Sill Cavalry. However, due to the economy, all the games would be played in Albany. The Lawton-Fort Sill Cavalry won their 2nd straight CBA championship 2 games to 1. This CBA championship was won in overtime to the score of 109–107. This was the first time in 16 years that a CBA championship was decided in overtime.

== 2009–2010 season ==
In August 2009, the Cavalry announced they would join the Premier Basketball League for the 2010 season. They would compile a record of 19–2, and enter the playoffs the No. 1 seed. First, they dispatched the Halifax Rainmen in 2 games. Then, they would advance to play the Rochester Razorsharks, who had just eliminated the No. 2 seed Puerto Rico Capitanes, for the PBL Finals. They lost Game 1 in Rochester 110–106, and would also have C Oliver Miller ejected and suspended for the remainder of the series for entering the stands to confront fans that were throwing items at Micheal Ray Richardson, who was moments earlier ejected from the game. However, the Cavalry would recover, easily taking the final 2 games of the series. With this Championship, the Cavalry have now won 3 Championships in their 3 years of existence in Lawton, having won 2 previous titles in the CBA.

== 2010–2011 season ==
The Lawton-Ft. Sill Cavalry finished the 2010–2011 regular season with a 17–2 record. The team advanced to the first round of the PBL playoffs vs. the Halifax Rainmen. A loss to the Halifax Rainmen in the PBL first round of playoffs on April 7, 2011, ended the Cavalry home win streak at 33 games dating back to when they played in the CBA. The Cavalry won the next two games advancing to the PBL finals which set up a rematch of the 2010 PBL finals vs. Rochester Razorsharks.

The Rochester Razorsharks won the first game of the best of 3 championship series 105–101 in Rochester on April 15, 2011. Suspect officiating had marred the Razorsharks's ascent to the championship, which continued in the series. Rochester eventually won the PBL Championship two games to one, prompting the Lawton Constitution to report that the Cavalry had dropped out of the PBL.

On April 19, 2011, the Cavalry announced that the team would not be returning to the PBL for a third season. The next day the Cavalry owners announced that they were suspending operations, with not being able to find a suitable league to continue as one of the factors.

== Notable former players ==
- Isaac Austin
- Lance Blanks
- Richard Dumas
- Ryan Minor
- Elmer Bennett
- Gabe Freeman
- Kermit Holmes
- Ozell Jones
- Jerome Lane
- Voshon Lenard
- Sam Mack
- Oliver Miller
- Elvin Mims
- Jimmy Oliver
- Keith Owens
- Doug Smith
- John Starks
- Erick Strickland
- Bernard Thompson
- Kelsey Weems
- Corey Williams
- Dennis Williams
