= Calgary 88's =

Basketball franchise in Calgary, Alberta

- League: World Basketball League
- History: Calgary 88's (1988–1992)
- Arena: Olympic Saddledome
- Capacity: 20,240
- Location: Calgary, Alberta
- President: Michael Smith
- Ownership: Michael Smith and John Havelock (Part Owner)
- Championships: 0
- Division/conference titles: 1 1991

The Calgary 88's was a professional basketball franchise based in Calgary, Alberta, from 1988 to 1992. The team played in the World Basketball League. The 1992 season saw the league fold before the season was completed.

The 88's played their home games at the Olympic Saddledome. Their best players during their time in Calgary consisted of Jim Thomas (Indiana), Chip Engelland (Duke), Darryl MacDonald (Texas A&M) John Spencer (Howard U), Chris Childs (Boise St), Kelby Stuckey (SW Missouri), Roland Gray (Saint Louis), Jerry Stroman (Utah), Nikita Wilson (LSU), Carlos Clark, David Henderson, Andre Turner, Sidney Lowe, Kelsey Weems, Perry Young, John Hegwood, Corey Gaines, and David Boone. Calgary coaches included Mike Thibault, Cory Russell and Roger Lyons. In five seasons, the 88's went 151-78.

== Personnel ==
Team President

- Michael Smith
- Jon Havelock

== Season by season record ==
Season	GP	W	L	GBL	Pct.	Finish	Playoffs
1988	54	32	22	–	.593	1st WBL	Lost Semi finals 109–107 to the Chicago Express
1989	44	31	13	–	.704	1st WBL	Won WBL Semi finals 2–1 Vs the Las Vegas Silver Streaks, Lost WBL Championship to Youngstown Pride 2-0
1990	46	29	17	9	.630	3rd WBL	Won WBL first round 2–0 Vs Erie Wave Won WBL semi finals 2–1 vs Las Vegas Silver Streaks, Lost WBL Championship to Youngstown Pride 3–2
1991	51	37	14	–	.725	1st WBL Northern Division	WBL 1st round BYE Won WBL Semi Finals 2–0 Vs Saskatchewan Storm, Lost WBL Championship 3–0 Vs Dayton Wings
1992	34	22	12	4.5	.647	3rd WBL	No playoffs due to league disbanding on August 1, 1992
Totals	229	151	78	–	.665		
