= Youngstown Pride =

American professional basketball team

- Founded: 1988
- League: World Basketball League
- Based in: Youngstown, Ohio
- Arena: Beeghly Center
- Colors
- Owner: Michael I. Monus
- Head coach: Floyd Kerr (1992)
- Championships: 2 (1989 & 1990)

The Youngstown Pride was a professional basketball team that competed in the World Basketball League during the late 1980s and early 1990s. Based in Youngstown, Ohio, the Pride was established in 1987 by Phar-Mor executive Michael I. Monus and performed well during its five-year lifespan. They were one of only three teams to ever win a WBL championship.

In 1988, the Pride closed its second season with a 28-26 record, placing third in a five-team league that included franchises from Calgary, Las Vegas, Chicago, Fresno, and Vancouver. The following year, the team fared better, sweeping the WBL league championship in two games over the Calgary 88's. Youngstown closed the season with a 31-13 record, compared to Calgary's 31-13.

In 1990, the Youngstown Pride enjoyed its best season, when it seized a second straight WBL championship with a stunning record of 38-8. The next year, the Pride competed well in the WBL's Northern Division, closing the 1991 season with a 26-25 record and placing second in the five-team division.

During its final season in 1992, the Pride posted a 22-13 record, placing second in what was now a 10-team league. At this point, however, the WBL was in trouble, and it disbanded before the close of the season. The league's unraveling is attributed to waning public interest.

== Season by season record ==
Season	GP	W	L	Pct.	GB	Finish	Playoffs
1988	54	28	26	.519	4	3rd WBL	Lost WBL Semi Finals 105–103 Vs Las Vegas Silver Streaks
1989	44	30	14	.682	1	2nd WBL	Won WBL Semi Finals 2–0 Vs Illinois Express, Won WBL Championship 2–0 Vs Calgary 88's
1990	46	38	8	.826	–	1st WBL	WBL First Round BYE, Won WBL Semi Finals 2–1 Vs Memphis Rockers, Won WBL Championship 3–2 Vs Calgary 88's
1991	51	26	25	.510	11	2nd WBL Northern Division	Lost WBL Northern Division First Round 2–0 Vs Saskatchewan Storm
1992	35	22	13	.629	5	3rd WBL	None, League Folds August 1, 1992
