= Los Angeles Clippers draft history =

This is a list of the Los Angeles Clippers' (formerly Buffalo Braves and San Diego Clippers) National Basketball Association (NBA) draft selections in their 56-year history.

== Key ==
Naismith Basketball Hall of Famer	First overall NBA draft pick	Selected for an NBA All-Star Game

== Selections ==
Year	Round	Pick	Player	College/High School/Club
Los Angeles Clippers
2025	1	30	Yanic Konan Niederhäuser	Penn State
2025	2	50	Kobe Sanders	Nevada
2024	2	46	Cam Christie	Minnesota
2023	1	30	Kobe Brown	Missouri
2023	2	48	Jordan Miller	Miami (Florida)
2022	2	43	Moussa Diabate	University of Michigan
2021	1	25	Quentin Grimes	University of Houston
2020	2	57	Reggie Perry	Mississippi State
2019	2	48	Terance Mann	Florida State
2019	2	54	Jaylen Hands	UCLA
2018	1	12	Miles Bridges	Michigan State
2018	1	13	Jerome Robinson	Boston College
2016	1	25	Brice Johnson	North Carolina
2016	2	33	Cheick Diallo	Kansas
2014	1	28	C.J. Wilcox	Washington
2013	1	25	Reggie Bullock	North Carolina
2012	2	53	Furkan Aldemir	Galatasaray (Turkey)
2011	2	37	Trey Thompkins	Georgia
2011	2	47	Travis Leslie	Georgia
2010	1	8	Al-Farouq Aminu	Wake Forest
2010	2	54	Willie Warren	Oklahoma
2009	1	1	Blake Griffin	Oklahoma
2008	1	7	Eric Gordon	Indiana
2008	2	35	DeAndre Jordan	Texas A&M
2007	1	14	Al Thornton	Florida State
2007	2	45	Jared Jordan	Marist
2006	2	34	Paul Davis	Michigan State
2006	2	52	Guillermo Diaz	Miami (Florida)
2005	1	12	Yaroslav Korolev	CSKA Moscow (Russia)
2005	2	32	Daniel Ewing	Duke
2004	1	4	Shaun Livingston	Peoria HS (Illinois)
2004	2	33	Lionel Chalmers	Xavier University
2003	1	6	Chris Kaman	Central Michigan
2003	2	34	Sofoklis Schortsanitis	Iraklis (Greece)
2002	1	6	Chris Wilcox	Maryland
2002	1	12	Melvin Ely	Fresno State
2002	2	40	Mario Kasun	Skyliners Frankfurt (Germany)
2001	1	2	Tyson Chandler	Dominguez HS
2000	1	3	Darius Miles	East St. Louis HS (Illinois)
2000	1	18	Quentin Richardson	DePaul
2000	2	30	Marko Jarić	Fortitudo Bologna (Italy)
1999	1	4	Lamar Odom	Rhode Island
1999	2	31	Rico Hill	Illinois State
1998	1	1	Michael Olowokandi	Pacific (California)
1998	2	48	Brian Skinner	Baylor
1997	1	14	Maurice Taylor	Michigan
1996	1	7	Lorenzen Wright	Memphis
1996	2	36	Doron Sheffer	Connecticut
1995	1	2	Antonio McDyess	Alabama
1995	2	53	Constantin Popa	Miami (Florida)
1993	1	13	Terry Dehere	Seton Hall
1993	2	53	Leonard White	Southern
1992	1	16	Randy Woods	La Salle
1992	1	25	Elmore Spencer	UNLV
1991	1	22	LeRon Ellis	Syracuse
1991	2	37	Elliott Perry	Memphis
1991	2	38	Joe Wylie	Miami (Florida)
1990	1	8	Bo Kimble	Loyola Marymount
1990	1	13	Loy Vaught	Michigan
1989	1	2	Danny Ferry	Duke
1989	2	31	Jeff Martin	Murray State
1989	2	33	Jay Edwards	Indiana
1988	1	1	Danny Manning	Kansas
1988	1	6	Hersey Hawkins	Bradley
1988	2	45	Tom Garrick	Rhode Island
1988	3	51	Rob Lock	Kentucky
1987	1	7	Reggie Williams	Georgetown
1987	1	13	Joe Wolf	North Carolina
1987	1	19	Ken Norman	Illinois
1987	2	38	Norris Coleman	Kansas State
1987	3	47	Tim McCalister	Oklahoma
1987	5	93	Chad Kessler	Georgia
1987	6	116	Martin Nessley	Duke
1987	7	139	Henry Carr	Wichita State
1986	3	54	Dwayne Polee	Pepperdine
1986	4	78	John Brownlee	Texas
1986	5	100	Steffond Johnson	San Diego State
1986	6	124	Tim Kempton	Notre Dame
1986	7	146	Johnny Brown	New Mexico
1985	1	3	Benoit Benjamin	Creighton
1985	3	52	Anicet Lavodrama	Houston Baptist
1985	4	74	Jim Deines	Arizona State
1985	5	99	Wayne Carlander	USC
1985	6	121	Malcolm Thomas	Missouri
1985	7	143	Gary Maloncon	UCLA
San Diego Clippers
1984	1	8	Lancaster Gordon	Louisville
1984	2	27	Michael Cage	San Diego State
1984	4	75	Marc Glass	Montana
1984	5	98	Alonza Allen	Louisiana Lafayette
1984	6	121	Phillip Haynes	Memphis
1984	7	144	David Brantley	Oregon
1984	8	167	Jim McLoughlin	Temple
1984	9	189	Dave Schultz	Westmont (California)
1984	10	211	Dick Mumma	Penn State
1983	1	4	Byron Scott	Arizona State
1983	5	97	Manute Bol (Note: Pick was invalidated.)	none
1983	7	142	Dan Evans	Oregon State
1983	8	165	Mark Gannon	Iowa
1983	9	188	David Maxwell	Fordham
1983	10	209	Keith Smith	San Diego State
1982	1	2	Terry Cummings	DePaul
1982	2	28	Richard Anderson	UC Santa Barbara
1982	3	48	Craig Hodges	Long Beach State
1982	4	71	Darius Clemons	Loyola (Illinois)
1982	5	94	Gary Carter	Tennessee
1982	6	117	Eric Marbury	Georgia
1982	7	140	Eddie Hughes	Colorado State
1982	8	163	Jacques Tuz	Colorado
1982	9	186	John Hedgwood	San Francisco
1982	10	207	Daryl Stovall	Creighton
1981	1	8	Tom Chambers	Utah
1981	3	54	Jim Smith	Ohio State
1981	4	77	Lee Raker	Virginia
1981	5	100	Dennis Isbell	Memphis
1981	6	123	Mike Pepper	North Carolina
1981	7	146	Randy Johnson	Southern Colorado
1981	8	168	Todd Haynes	Davidson
1981	9	190	Art Jones	NC State
1981	10	210	Tony Gwynn	San Diego state
1980	1	9	Michael Brooks	La Salle
1980	4	76	Ed Odom	Oklahoma State
1980	5	99	Wally Rank	San Jose State
1980	6	122	Londale Theus	Santa Clara
1980	7	145	Paul Anderson	USC
1979	3	55	Tom Channel	Boston University
1979	4	77	Lionel Garrett	Southern
1979	5	99	Greg Joyner	MTSU
1979	6	119	Bob Bender	Duke
1979	7	139	Jene Grey	Le Moyne
1979	8	158	Renaldo Lawrence	Appalachian State
1979	9	176	Mike Dodd	San Diego State
1979	10	194	Greg Hunter	Loyola Marymount
Buffalo Braves
1978	2	41	Jerome Whitehead	Marquette
1978	3	48	Mike Santos	Utah State
1978	3	51	Ricky Gallon	Louisville
1978	3	65	Marvin Delph	Arkansas
1978	4	68	Jim Boylan	Marquette
1978	4	73	Larry Harris	Pittsburgh
1978	4	76	Leroy McDonald	Wake Forest
1978	5	90	David Thompson	Florida State
1978	6	112	Bob Miscevicious	Providence
1978	7	133	Stan Pietkiewicz	Auburn
1978	8	154	Felton Young	Jacksonville
1978	9	172	Bobby White	Centenary
1977	2	24	Larry Johnson	Kentucky
1977	4	68	Melvin Watkins	Charlotte
1977	5	90	Mike Hanley	Niagara
1977	6	112	Curvan Lewis	Virginia Union
1977	7	133	Mike Jackson	Tennessee
1977	8	153	Emery Sammons	Philadelphia
1976	1	6	Adrian Dantley	Notre Dame
1976	3	48	Gary Brewster	UTEP
1976	6	100	Danny Odums	Fairfield
1976	7	118	Frank Jones	Tennessee Tech
1976	8	136	Mark McAndrew	Providence
1976	9	153	Bob Rozyczko	St. Bonaventure
1976	10	169	Tim Stokes	Canisius
1975	3	52	George Bucci	Manhattan
1975	4	70	Bob Fleischer	Duke
1975	5	88	Sam Berry	Armstrong State (Note: Formerly known as Armstrong Atlantic State.)
1975	6	106	Larry Jackson	Charlotte
1975	7	124	Mike Franklin	Cincinnati
1975	8	142	Allen Jones	Pepperdine
1975	9	158	George Rautins	Niagara
1975	10	172	Art Allen	Pepperdine
1974	1	9	Tom McMillen	Maryland
1974	3	45	Kim Hughes	Wisconsin
1974	4	63	Bernie Harris	VCU
1974	5	81	Tony Byers	Wake Forest
1974	6	99	Gary Link	Missouri
1974	7	117	Tommy Curtis	UCLA
1974	8	135	Glenn Price	St. Bonaventure
1974	9	153	John Falconi	Davidson
1974	10	170	Andy Rimol	Princeton
1973	1	3	Ernie DiGregorio	Providence
1973	3	38	Ken Charles	Fordham
1973	4	54	Doug Little	Oregon
1973	5	72	Randy Noll	Marshall
1973	6	88	Mike Macaluso	Canisius
1973	7	106	Tim Bassett	Georgia
1973	8	122	Carl Jackson	St. Bonaventure
1973	9	140	Bob Fullerton	Xavier
1973	10	153	Nick Connor	Illinois
1973	11	168	Mike Lee	Syracuse
1973	12	176	Aaron Convington	Canisius
1973	13	184	Bob Vartanian	Buffalo
1973	14	190	Ron Gilliam	SUNY Brockport
1973	15	195	John Fraley	Georgia
1973	16	200	John Green	Oregon
1973	17	204	Jim Garvin	Boston University
1973	18	207	Don Johnston	North Carolina
1973	19	209	Ron Thorsten	UBC (Canada)
1973	20	211	Phil Tollestrup	Lethbridge (Canada)
1972	1	2	Bob McAdoo	North Carolina
1972	2	15	Harold Fox	Jacksonville
1972	3	32	Bob Morse	Pennsylvania
1972	4	49	George Bryant	Eastern Kentucky
1972	5	65	Arnie Berman	Brown
1972	6	83	Ed Czernota	Sacred Heart (Connecticut)
1972	7	99	Greg Kohls	Syracuse
1972	8	115	Andy Denny	South Alabama
1972	9	131	John Collins	SUNY Brockport
1972	11	158	Jim Prokell	Edinboro (Pennsylvania)
1972	12	167	Frank Dewitt	Virginia
1972	13	176	Kim Huband	North Carolina
1972	14	182	Greg Corson	North Carolina
1972	15	189	Paul Hoffman	St. Bonaventure
1972	16	194	Norman Bounds	SUNY Brockport
1971	1	3	Elmore Smith	Kentucky State
1971	2	19	Fred Hilton	Grambling State
1971	2	26	Amos Thomas	Southwestern Oklahoma State
1971	2	30	Spencer Haywood	Detroit
1971	4	53	Jimmy O'Brien	Boston College
1971	5	70	Gary Nelson	Duquesne
1971	6	87	Glen Summors	Gannon
1971	7	104	Randy Smith	Buffalo State
1971	8	121	Craig Love	Ohio
1971	9	138	Gary Stewart	Canisius
1971	10	154	Don Ward	Colgate
1971	11	170	Bill Warner	Arizona
1971	12	184	Butch Webster	LSU
1971	13	197	Pete Smith	Valdosta State
1971	14	209	Ray Lavender	Drury
1971	15	218	William Chatmon	Baylor
1971	16	226	James Douglas	Memphis
1971	17	230	Nelson Isley	LSU
1971	18	233	Joey Meyer	DePaul
1970	1	7	John Hummer	Princeton
1970	2	24	Cornell Warner	Jackson State
1970	3	43	Chip Case	Virginia
1970	4	58	Erwin Polnick	Stephen F. Austin State
1970	5	77	Robert Moore	Central State
1970	6	92	Doug Hess	Toledo (Ohio)
1970	7	111	Cliff Shegogg	Colorado State
1970	8	126	Larry Woods	West Virginia
1970	9	145	Larry Duckworth	Henderson State
1970	10	160	Joe Taylor	Dillard
1970	11	177	Dick Walker	Wake Forest
