= Indiana Pacers draft history =

The Indiana Pacers have selected the following players in the National Basketball Association Draft.

== Key ==
| Naismith Basketball Hall of Famer | First overall NBA draft pick | Selected for an NBA All-Star Game |

| Year | Round | Pick | Name | From |
|---|---|---|---|---|
| 2024 | 2 | 36 | Juan Núñez (traded to San Antonio) | Ratiopharm Ulm (Germany) |
| 2024 | 2 | 49 | Tristen Newton | Connecticut |
| 2024 | 2 | 50 | Enrique Freeman | Akron |
| 2023 | 1 | 7 | Bilal Coulibaly (traded to Washington) | Metropolitans 92 (France) |
| 2023 | 1 | 26 | Ben Sheppard | Belmont |
| 2023 | 1 | 29 | Julian Strawther (traded to Denver) | Gonzaga |
| 2023 | 2 | 32 | Jalen Pickett (traded to Denver) | Penn State |
| 2023 | 2 | 55 | Isaiah Wong | Miami |
| 2022 | 1 | 6 | Bennedict Mathurin | Arizona |
| 2022 | 2 | 31 | Andrew Nembhard | Gonzaga |
| 2022 | 2 | 58 | Hugo Besson (traded to Milwaukee) | New Zealand Breakers (Australia) |
| 2021 | 1 | 13 | Chris Duarte | Oregon |
| 2021 | 2 | 54 | Sandro Mamukelashvili (traded to Milwaukee) | Seton Hall |
| 2021 | 2 | 60 | Georgios Kalaitzakis (traded to Milwaukee) | Panathinaikos B.C. (Greece) |
| 2020 | 2 | 54 | Cassius Stanley | Duke |
| 2019 | 1 | 18 | Goga Bitadze | KK Mega Leks (Serbia) |
| 2019 | 2 | 50 | Jarrell Brantley (traded to Utah) | College of Charleston |
| 2018 | 1 | 23 | Aaron Holiday | UCLA |
| 2018 | 2 | 50 | Alize Johnson | Missouri State |
| 2017 | 1 | 18 | T. J. Leaf | UCLA |
| 2017 | 2 | 47 | Ike Anigbogu | UCLA |
| 2016 | 1 | 20 | Caris LeVert (traded to Brooklyn) | Michigan |
| 2016 | 2 | 50 | Georges Niang | Iowa State |
| 2015 | 1 | 11 | Myles Turner | Texas |
| 2015 | 2 | 43 | Joe Young | Oregon |
| 2014 | 2 | 57 | Louis Labeyrie (traded to New York) | Paris-Levallois Basket (France) |
| 2013 | 1 | 23 | Solomon Hill | Arizona |
| 2013 | 2 | 53 | Colton Iverson (traded to Boston) | Colorado State |
| 2012 | 1 | 26 | Miles Plumlee | Duke |
| 2011 | 1 | 15 | Kawhi Leonard (traded to San Antonio) | San Diego State |
| 2011 | 2 | 42 | Dāvis Bertāns (traded to San Antonio) | Union Olimpija (Slovenia) |
| 2010 | 1 | 10 | Paul George | Fresno State |
| 2010 | 2 | 40 | Lance Stephenson | Cincinnati |
| 2010 | 2 | 57 | Ryan Reid (traded to Oklahoma City) | Florida State |
| 2009 | 1 | 13 | Tyler Hansbrough | North Carolina |
| 2009 | 2 | 52 | A. J. Price | Connecticut |
| 2008 | 1 | 11 | Jerryd Bayless (traded to Portland) | Arizona |
| 2008 | 2 | 41 | Nathan Jawai (traded to Toronto) | Cairns Taipans (Australia) |
| 2006 | 1 | 17 | Shawne Williams | Memphis |
| 2006 | 2 | 45 | Alexander Johnson (traded to Portland) | Florida State |
| 2005 | 1 | 17 | Danny Granger | New Mexico |
| 2005 | 2 | 46 | Erazem Lorbek (traded to San Antonio) | Climamio Bologna (Italy) |
| 2004 | 1 | 29 | David Harrison | Colorado |
| 2004 | 2 | 59 | Rashad Wright | Georgia |
| 2003 | 2 | 49 | James Jones | Miami (FL) |
| 2002 | 1 | 14 | Fred Jones | Oregon |
| 2001 | 2 | 40 | Jamison Brewer | Auburn |
| 2000 | 1 | 27 | Primoz Brezec | Union Olimpija (Slovenia) |
| 2000 | 2 | 56 | Jaquay Walls | Colorado |
| 1999 | 1 | 26 | Vonteego Cummings (traded to Golden State) | Pittsburgh |
| 1998 | 1 | 25 | Al Harrington | St. Patrick HS |
| 1997 | 1 | 12 | Austin Croshere | Providence |
| 1996 | 1 | 10 | Erick Dampier | Mississippi State |
| 1996 | 2 | 52 | Mark Pope | Kentucky |
| 1995 | 1 | 23 | Travis Best | Georgia Tech |
| 1995 | 2 | 52 | Fred Hoiberg | Iowa State |
| 1994 | 1 | 15 | Eric Piatkowski (traded to Los Angeles) | Nebraska |
| 1994 | 2 | 41 | William Njoku | Saint Mary's (Halifax) |
| 1994 | 2 | 44 | Damon Bailey | Indiana |
| 1993 | 1 | 14 | Scott Haskin | Oregon State |
| 1993 | 2 | 39 | Thomas Hill | Duke |
| 1993 | 2 | 51 | Spencer Dunkley | Delaware |
| 1992 | 1 | 14 | Malik Sealy | St. John's |
| 1991 | 1 | 13 | Dale Davis | Clemson |
| 1991 | 2 | 41 | Sean Green | Iona |
| 1990 | 2 | 45 | Antonio Davis | UTEP |
| 1990 | 2 | 46 | Kenny Williams | Elizabeth City State |
| 1989 | 1 | 7 | George McCloud | Florida State |
| 1988 | 1 | 2 | Rik Smits | Marist |
| 1988 | 3 | 61 | Herbert Crook | Louisville |
| 1988 | 3 | 73 | Michael Anderson | Drexel |
| 1987 | 1 | 11 | Reggie Miller | UCLA |
| 1987 | 2 | 34 | Brian Rowsom | UNC Wilmington |
| 1987 | 3 | 60 | Sean Couch | Columbia |
| 1987 | 5 | 103 | Mike Milling | UNC Charlotte |
| 1987 | 6 | 126 | Gary Graham | UNLV |
| 1987 | 7 | 149 | Montel Hatcher | UCLA |
| 1986 | 1 | 4 | Chuck Person | Auburn |
| 1986 | 2 | 26 | Greg Dreiling | Kansas |
| 1986 | 4 | 72 | Derrick Taylor | LSU |
| 1986 | 5 | 95 | Richard Rellford | Michigan |
| 1986 | 6 | 118 | Jeff Hall | Louisville |
| 1986 | 7 | 141 | Steve Woodside | Oregon State |
| 1985 | 1 | 2 | Wayman Tisdale | Oklahoma |
| 1985 | 2 | 26 | Bill Martin | Georgetown |
| 1985 | 2 | 27 | Dwayne McClain | Villanova |
| 1985 | 3 | 48 | Kenny Patterson | DePaul |
| 1985 | 4 | 72 | Vince Hamilton | Clemson |
| 1985 | 5 | 94 | Kelvin Johnson | Richmond |
| 1985 | 5 | 111 | Ivan Daniels | UIC |
| 1985 | 6 | 118 | Stu Primus | Boston College |
| 1985 | 7 | 140 | Jeff Acres | Oral Roberts |
| 1985 | 7 | 157 | Don Turney | Marshall |
| 1984 | 1 | 18 | Vern Fleming | Georgia |
| 1984 | 2 | 25 | Devin Durrant | BYU |
| 1984 | 2 | 29 | Stuart Gray | UCLA |
| 1984 | 4 | 71 | Ralph Jackson | UCLA |
| 1984 | 5 | 94 | Gene Smith | Georgetown |
| 1984 | 6 | 117 | Clyde Vaughan | Pittsburgh |
| 1984 | 7 | 140 | Kenton Edelin | Virginia |
| 1984 | 8 | 163 | Tom Heitz | Kentucky |
| 1984 | 9 | 185 | Brian Martin | Kansas |
| 1984 | 10 | 207 | Gary Carver | Western Kentucky |
| 1983 | 1 | 2 | Steve Stipanovich | Missouri |
| 1983 | 1 | 23 | Mitchell Wiggins (traded to Chicago) | Florida State |
| 1983 | 2 | 26 | Leroy Combs | Oklahoma State |
| 1983 | 2 | 40 | Jim Thomas | Indiana |
| 1983 | 3 | 49 | Greg Jones | West Virginia |
| 1983 | 4 | 72 | Terry Fair | Georgia |
| 1983 | 5 | 95 | Roger Stieg | Mississippi |
| 1983 | 6 | 118 | Cliff Pruitt | UAB |
| 1983 | 7 | 141 | Tony Brown | Indiana |
| 1983 | 8 | 164 | Ray McCallum | Ball State |
| 1983 | 9 | 186 | Lynn Mitchem | Butler |
| 1983 | 10 | 207 | Mark Smed | Augustana (SD) |
| 1982 | 1 | 8 | Clark Kellogg | Ohio State |
| 1982 | 2 | 40 | Guy Morgan | Wake Forest |
| 1982 | 2 | 43 | Jose Slaughter | Portland |
| 1982 | 4 | 77 | Jeff Jones | Virginia |
| 1982 | 5 | 100 | Rich DiBenedetto | Wisconsin–Eau Claire |
| 1982 | 6 | 123 | Jeff Clark | Saint Joseph's |
| 1982 | 7 | 146 | Brad Leaf | Evansville |
| 1982 | 8 | 169 | Donald Reese | Bradley |
| 1982 | 9 | 192 | Mike Scearce | Purdue |
| 1982 | 10 | 213 | Craig Summers | Wisconsin–Stout |
| 1981 | 1 | 14 | Herb Williams | Ohio State |
| 1981 | 2 | 36 | Ray Blume (traded to Chicago) | Oregon State |
| 1981 | 2 | 37 | Al Leslie | Bucknell |
| 1981 | 3 | 60 | Purvis Miller | USC |
| 1981 | 4 | 83 | Rolando Frazier | Briar Cliff |
| 1981 | 5 | 106 | George Peterson | New Jersey City |
| 1981 | 6 | 129 | Robert Fronk | Washington |
| 1981 | 7 | 152 | Larry McKinney | Boise State |
| 1981 | 8 | 174 | Len Hatzenbeller | Drexel |
| 1981 | 9 | 195 | Scott Whitley | William & Mary |
| 1981 | 10 | 215 | Rodney Benson | Wright State |
| 1980 | 2 | 29 | Louis Orr | Syracuse |
| 1980 | 2 | 30 | Kenny Natt | Northeast Louisiana |
| 1980 | 2 | 40 | Dick Miller | Toledo |
| 1980 | 4 | 78 | Rich Branning | Notre Dame |
| 1980 | 5 | 100 | Joe Galvin | Illinois State |
| 1980 | 6 | 124 | Randy Owens | Philadelphia Textile |
| 1980 | 7 | 146 | Charles Naddaff | Lafayette |
| 1980 | 8 | 167 | Steve Stielper | James Madison |
| 1980 | 9 | 186 | Scott Rogers | Kenyon |
| 1980 | 10 | 204 | John Bates | West Virginia Wesleyan |
| 1979 | 1 | 13 | Dudley Bradley | North Carolina |
| 1979 | 2 | 32 | Tony Zeno | Arizona State |
| 1979 | 4 | 74 | Don Newman | Idaho |
| 1979 | 5 | 98 | Billy Reid | San Francisco |
| 1979 | 6 | 117 | Greg Guye | Stetson |
| 1979 | 7 | 136 | Dirk Ewing | Stetson |
| 1979 | 8 | 157 | Brian Magid | George Washington |
| 1978 | 1 | 3 | Rick Robey | Kentucky |
| 1978 | 2 | 27 | Wayne Radford | Indiana |
| 1978 | 4 | 71 | Ricky Lee | Oregon State |
| 1978 | 5 | 92 | James Sparrow | North Carolina A&T |
| 1978 | 6 | 115 | Sherman Dillard | James Madison |
| 1978 | 7 | 135 | Ollie Matson | Pepperdine |
| 1977 | 2 | 29 | Alonzo Bradley (traded to Houston) | Texas Southern |
| 1977 | 3 | 51 | Stan Mayhew | Weber State |
| 1977 | 4 | 73 | George Pendleton | Georgia State |
| 1977 | 5 | 95 | Marvin Jackson | Prairie View A&M |
| 1977 | 6 | 117 | Tom Scheffler | Purdue |
