= 1985 NCAA Men's Basketball All-Americans =

- Awarded for: 1984–85 NCAA Division I men's basketball season

The Consensus 1985 College Basketball All-American team, as determined by aggregating the results of four major All-American teams. To earn "consensus" status, a player must win honors from a majority of the following teams: the Associated Press, the USBWA, The United Press International and the National Association of Basketball Coaches.

== 1985 Consensus All-America team ==
Consensus First Team
Player	Position	Class	Team
Johnny Dawkins	G	Junior	Duke
Patrick Ewing	C	Senior	Georgetown
Keith Lee	F/C	Senior	Memphis State
Xavier McDaniel	F	Senior	Wichita State
Chris Mullin	F	Senior	St. John's
Wayman Tisdale	F	Junior	Oklahoma

Consensus Second Team
Player	Position	Class	Team
Len Bias	F	Junior	Maryland
Jon Koncak	C	Senior	Southern Methodist
Mark Price	G	Junior	Georgia Tech
Kenny Walker	F	Junior	Kentucky
Dwayne Washington	G	Sophomore	Syracuse

== Individual All-America teams ==
All-America Team
All-America Team	First team		Second team		Third team	
All-America Team	Player	School	Player	School	Player	School
Associated Press	Patrick Ewing	Georgetown	Len Bias	Maryland	A.C. Green	Oregon State
Associated Press	Keith Lee	Memphis State	Johnny Dawkins	Duke	Alfredrick Hughes	Loyola Chicago
Associated Press	Xavier McDaniel	Wichita State	Jon Koncak	Southern Methodist	Roy Tarpley	Michigan
Associated Press	Chris Mullin	St. John's	Mark Price	Georgia Tech	Sam Vincent	Michigan State
Associated Press	Wayman Tisdale	Oklahoma	Kenny Walker	Kentucky	Dwayne Washington	Syracuse
USBWA	Patrick Ewing	Georgetown	Len Bias	Maryland	No third team	
USBWA	Keith Lee	Memphis State	Jon Koncak	Southern Methodist	No third team	
USBWA	Xavier McDaniel	Wichita State	Roy Tarpley	Michigan	No third team	
USBWA	Chris Mullin	St. John's	Kenny Walker	Kentucky	No third team	
USBWA	Wayman Tisdale	Oklahoma	Dwayne Washington	Syracuse	No third team	
NABC	Johnny Dawkins	Duke	Jon Koncak	Southern Methodist	Benoit Benjamin	Creighton
NABC	Patrick Ewing	Georgetown	Karl Malone	Louisiana Tech	Len Bias	Maryland
NABC	Keith Lee	Memphis State	Mark Price	Georgia Tech	Xavier McDaniel	Wichita State
NABC	Chris Mullin	St. John's	Sam Vincent	Michigan State	Detlef Schrempf	Washington
NABC	Wayman Tisdale	Oklahoma	Kenny Walker	Kentucky	Dwayne Washington	Syracuse
UPI	Johnny Dawkins	Duke	Steve Harris	Tulsa	A. C. Green	Oregon State
UPI	Patrick Ewing	Georgetown	Jon Koncak	Southern Methodist	Alfredrick Hughes	Loyola Chicago
UPI	Keith Lee	Memphis State	Xavier McDaniel	Wichita State	Mark Price	Georgia Tech
UPI	Chris Mullin	St. John's	Kenny Walker	Kentucky	Roy Tarpley	Michigan
UPI	Wayman Tisdale	Oklahoma	Dwayne Washington	Syracuse	Sam Vincent	Michigan State

AP Honorable Mention:

- Mark Acres, Oral Roberts
- Michael Adams, Boston College
- Richie Adams, UNLV
- Rafael Addison, Syracuse
- Leonard Allen, San Diego State
- Jaye Andrews, Bucknell
- Eddie Archie, Alcorn State
- Mitch Arnold, Fresno State
- Terrance Bailey, Wagner
- John Bajusz, Cornell
- Ken Bantum, Cornell
- Andre Battle, Loyola Chicago
- John Battle, Rutgers
- William Bedford, Memphis State
- Benoit Benjamin, Creighton
- Walter Berry, St. John's
- Uwe Blab, Indiana
- Steve Black, La Salle
- Jim Bolger, Rider
- Eric Boyd, North Carolina A&T
- Charlie Bradley, South Florida
- Aaron Brandon, Alcorn State
- Perry Bromwell, Penn
- Michael Brooks, Tennessee
- Jimmy Brown, North Carolina A&T
- Mike Brown, George Washington
- Jim Bullock, Purdue
- Luther Burden, Saint Louis
- Vernon Butler, Navy
- Bernard Campbell, Delaware State
- Shawn Campbell, Weber State
- Wayne Carlander, USC
- Joe Carrabino, Harvard
- Terry Catledge, South Alabama
- Lorenzo Charles, NC State
- Keith Cieplicki, William & Mary
- Michael Clark, Little Rock
- Fred Cofield, Eastern Michigan
- Jon Collins, Eastern Illinois
- David Cooke, St. Mary's
- Kim Cooksey, Middle Tennessee
- Tyrone Corbin, DePaul
- Phil Cox, Vanderbilt
- Randy Cozzens, Army
- Dell Curry, Virginia Tech
- Ivan Daniels, UIC
- Brad Daugherty, North Carolina
- Tony Duckett, Lafayette
- Joe Dumars, McNeese State
- Gay Elmore, VMI
- Matt England, Houston Baptist
- Ken Epperson, Toledo
- Jerry Everett, Lamar
- Alvin Franklin, Houston
- Kenny Gattison, Old Dominion
- Derrick Gervin, UTSA
- Luster Goodwin, UTEP
- Greg Grant, Utah State
- Anthony Grier, Kent State
- Granger Hall, Temple
- Ray Hall, Canisius
- Jeff Hamilton, Saint Francis (PA)
- Tony Hargraves, lona
- Ron Harper, Miami (Ohio)
- Steve Harris, Tulsa
- Arthur Hayes, Northeast Louisiana
- Skip Henderson, Marshall
- Curtis High, Nevada
- Dave Hoppen, Nebraska
- Bubba Jennings, Texas Tech
- Harold Keeling, Santa Clara
- Ron Kellogg, Kansas
- John Keshock, Youngstown State
- Stephen Kite, Tennessee Tech
- Joe Kleine, Arkansas
- Randy Kraayenbrink, Northern Iowa
- Larry Krystkowiak, Montana
- Derrick Lamar, Rider
- Rolando Lamb, VCU
- Anicet Lavodrama, Houston Baptist
- Ralph Lewis, La Salle
- Reggie Lewis, Northeastern
- Quinton Lytle, Western Carolina
- Karl Malone, Louisiana Tech
- Bill Martin, Georgetown
- Maurice Martin, St. Joseph's
- Bob McCann, Morehead State
- Eugene McDowell, Florida
- Tony McIntosh, Fordham
- Sam Mitchell, Mercer
- Steve Mitchell, UAB
- Vernon Moore, Creighton
- Tod Murphy, UC Irvine
- Tony Neal, Cal State Fullerton
- Johnny Newman, Richmond
- Dennis Nutt, TCU
- Dan Palombizio, Ball State
- Sylvester Parson, South Carolina State
- Kenny Patterson, DePaul
- Chuck Person, Auburn
- Nelson Peterson, Idaho State
- Mike Phelps, Alcorn State
- Ed Pinckney, Villanova
- Doug Poetzsch, Siena
- Dwayne Polee, Pepperdine
- Daren Queenan, Lehigh
- Dwayne Randall, Nevada
- Clinton Ransey, Cleveland State
- Blair Rasmussen, Oregon
- Charles Rayne, Temple
- Art Redmond, Wagner
- David Rivers, Notre Dame
- David Robinson, Navy
- Bryan Roth, Akron
- Timo Saarelainen, BYU
- Robert Sanders, Mississippi Valley State
- Detlef Schrempf, Washington
- Carey Scurry, LIU
- Willie Simmons, Louisiana Tech
- Clinton Smith, Cleveland State
- Juden Smith, UTEP
- Keith Smith, Loyola Marymount
- Mike Smrek, Canisius
- Dominic Snowden, Delaware State
- Barry Stevens, Iowa State
- Greg Stokes, Iowa
- Shawn Teague, Boston University
- Malcolm Thomas, Missouri
- Billy Thompson, Louisville
- Regan Truesdale, The Citadel
- Chad Tucker, Butler
- Tom Undermon, Robert Morris
- Nick Vanos, Santa Clara
- Earl Walker, Mercer
- Anthony Watson, San Diego State
- Gerald Wilkins, Chattanooga
- Joe Williams, Alabama State
- John Sherman Williams, Indiana State
- John Williams, Tulane
- Pete Williams, Arizona
- Carlos Yates, George Mason
- Perry Young, Virginia Tech
