= Malcolm Thomas (basketball, born 1988) =

American basketball player (born 1988)

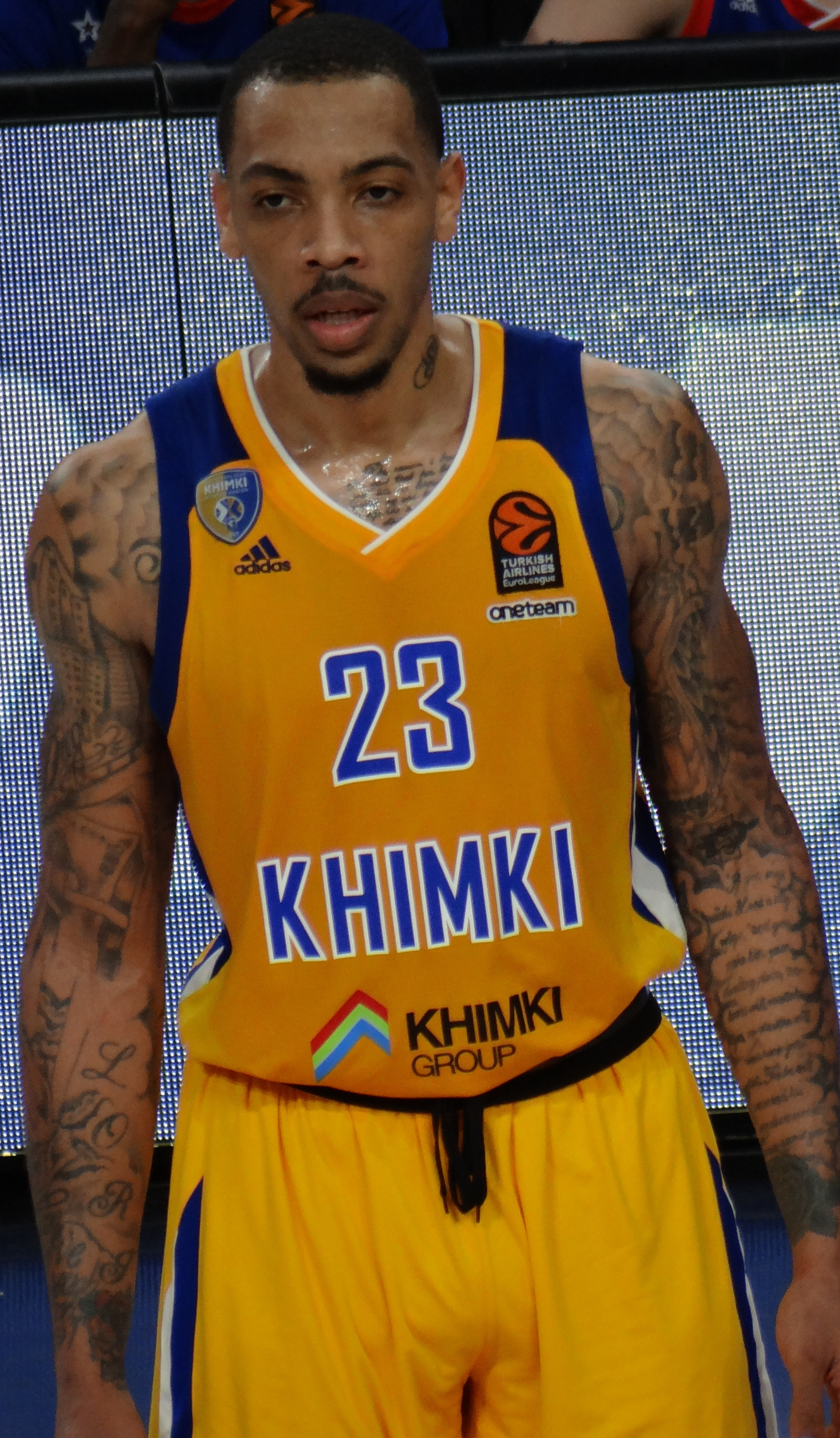
- Thomas with Khimki in 2018

Free agent
- Position: Power forward

Personal information
- Born: November 8, 1988 (age 37) San Diego, California, U.S.
- Listed height: 6 ft 9 in (2.06 m)
- Listed weight: 225 lb (102 kg)

Career information
- High school: Crawford (San Diego, California)
- College: Pepperdine (2007–2008); San Diego CC (2008–2009); San Diego State (2009–2011)
- NBA draft: 2011: undrafted
- Playing career: 2011–present

Career history
- 2011: Mobis Phoebus
- 2011–2012: Los Angeles D-Fenders
- 2012: San Antonio Spurs
- 2012: →Austin Toros
- 2012: Rio Grande Valley Vipers
- 2012–2013: Maccabi Tel Aviv
- 2013: Los Angeles D-Fenders
- 2013: Golden State Warriors
- 2013: →Santa Cruz Warriors
- 2013: Chicago Bulls
- 2013–2014: San Antonio Spurs
- 2013–2014: →Austin Toros
- 2014: Utah Jazz
- 2014–2015: Philadelphia 76ers
- 2015: Piratas de Quebradillas
- 2015–2016: Los Angeles D-Fenders
- 2016–2017: Jilin Northeast Tigers
- 2017–2019: Khimki
- 2019: Shanxi Loongs
- 2019–2020: Fenerbahçe
- 2020: Bayern Munich
- 2021: Unicaja
- 2021–2022: Petkim Spor
- 2022–2023: BC Samara
- 2023: Wonju DB Promy
- 2023–2024: Büyükçekmece Basketbol
- 2025: Sagesse Club

Career highlights
- Turkish Cup winner (2020); NBA D-League All-Star (2014); All-NBA D-League First Team (2012); 2× Second-team All-MWC (2010, 2011); MWC All-Defensive team (2011)
- Stats at NBA.com
- Stats at Basketball Reference

Malcolm Iseiah Thomas (born November 8, 1988) is an American professional basketball player who last played for the Sagesse Club of the Lebanese Basketball League (LBL). He played college basketball for the San Diego State Aztecs, where he twice earned second-team All-Mountain West Conference (MWC) honors.

== Early life ==
Thomas was born in Columbia, Missouri, to his father, also named Malcolm Thomas, and Lori Dawson. His father was an honorable mention All-American basketball player at Missouri and drafted in the sixth round of the 1985 NBA draft by the Los Angeles Clippers.

The younger Thomas was raised by his mother and aunts, while his father was not always around. Thomas played at Crawford High School in San Diego, California, helping Crawford to a California Interscholastic Federation (CIF) section title in his senior year.

== College career ==
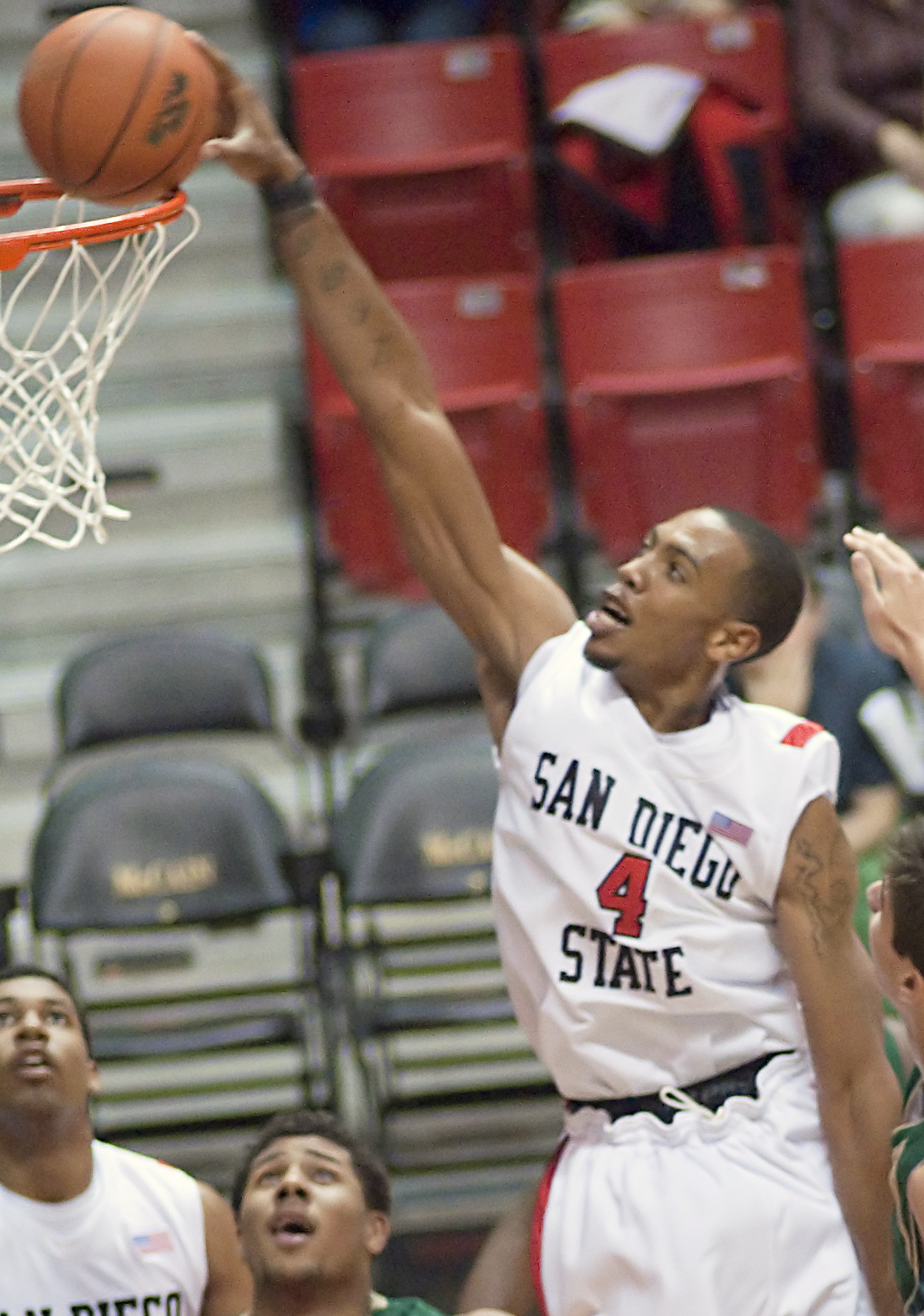
Thomas dunking

Thomas averaged 12.5 points and 8.8 rebounds as freshman at Pepperdine University. He transferred to San Diego City College and averaged 21.1 points, 12.9 rebounds and 3.9 blocks and was named California Community College Athletic Association (CCCAA) co-Most Valuable Player (MVP) and the Pacific Coast Conference Player of the Year. He declared early for the 2009 NBA draft, but withdrew after one NBA workout.

He went on to play two seasons at SDSU and twice earned All-MWC second team honors. In his senior year, he was named 2011 All-MWC defensive team after finishing second in the conference in rebounding and blocked shots. The team advanced to the NCAA Sweet 16 that season. He ended his two-year career with the Aztecs as the school's second leading all-time shot blocker and ranked eighth all-time in both rebound average and field goal percentage.

== Professional career ==
=== 2011–12 ===
Thomas went undrafted in the 2011 NBA draft. During the NBA lockout that summer, he signed a $350,000 contract to play a season for Mobis Phoebus in the Korean Basketball League. Most overseas rookies made about $100,000–$150,000. The team released him in November 2011, despite his averaging 21 points, 11 rebounds, three blocks, and three assists. They wanted a more veteran player, but agreed to pay the remainder of Thomas' salary.

Thomas was signed by the Los Angeles Lakers on December 13, 2011. On December 17, he was assigned to the Los Angeles D-Fenders by the Lakers, and was recalled the next day. He was waived by the Lakers before the start of the 2011–12 season. He was signed by the D-Fenders on December 28.

On January 11, 2012, Thomas was then signed by the San Antonio Spurs, where he was reunited with former Aztec teammate Kawhi Leonard. He played in his first NBA game on January 13 against the Portland Trail Blazers, getting one rebound in two minutes of garbage time. Thomas was assigned to the Austin Toros on January 30. On February 7, the Spurs waived Thomas. He joined the D-Fenders again on February 9.

Later that season, he signed with the Houston Rockets, who assigned him to the Rio Grande Valley Vipers. He then rejoined the D-Fenders, with whom he played in the D-League finals.

=== 2012–13 ===
On October 3, 2012, Thomas signed a one-year contract with EuroLeague club Maccabi Tel Aviv of Israel. In competition in Israel, he averaged 7.4 points, 5.3 rebounds, and 1.3 blocks, and in EuroLeague competition he had a double-double of 14 points and 11 rebounds in 26 minutes in a 70–68 victory over Italian Montepaschi Siena in mid-October. However, after Tel Aviv signed 6-foot-11 Croatian Darko Planinić, his minutes decreased. Thomas was waived by Maccabi Tel Aviv in February 2013.

On March 5, he rejoined the Los Angeles D-Fenders. On March 8, Thomas was called up from the D-League and signed a 10-day contract with the Golden State Warriors. He was assigned to the Santa Cruz Warriors of the NBA D-League on March 12, 2013. He was recalled a day later.

On March 19, 2013, Thomas signed a 10-day contract with the Chicago Bulls. He signed a second 10-day contract on March 29, and signed for the remainder of the season on April 8. On July 23, he was waived by the Bulls.

=== 2013–14 ===
In November 2013, Thomas was reacquired by the Los Angeles D-Fenders.

On December 3, 2013, Thomas signed with the San Antonio Spurs and was assigned multiple time to the Austin Toros. On January 23, 2014, he was waived by the Spurs. Two days later, he was claimed off waivers by the Utah Jazz.

On February 3, 2014, Thomas was named to the Futures All-Star roster for the 2014 NBA D-League All-Star Game.

=== 2014–15 ===
On July 22, 2014, Thomas was traded by Utah, along with John Lucas III and Erik Murphy, to the Cleveland Cavaliers in exchange for Carrick Felix, a 2015 second round draft pick, and cash considerations. On September 25, he was traded, along with John Lucas III, Erik Murphy, Dwight Powell, and the Cavaliers' 2016 and 2017 second-round picks, to the Boston Celtics in exchange for Keith Bogans and two future second-round picks. Four days later, he was waived by the Celtics.

On October 27, 2014, Thomas signed with the Philadelphia 76ers. On November 10, he was waived by the 76ers after appearing in five games. He had been playing with fluid and loose cartilage in his left knee. On December 23, 2014, he re-signed with the 76ers. On February 22, 2015, he was waived again by the 76ers.

In April 2015, Thomas signed with the Piratas de Quebradillas of Puerto Rico.

=== 2015–16 ===
On October 31, 2015, Thomas was acquired by the Los Angeles D-Fenders, returning to the franchise for a fourth stint. On January 29, 2016, he left the D-Fenders to sign with the Meralco Bolts of the Philippines. However, on February 6, 2016, he was released by the Bolts after suffering an injury before the start of the 2016 PBA Commissioner's Cup.

=== 2016–17 ===
On July 30, 2016, Thomas signed with Jilin Northeast Tigers of China for the 2016–17 CBA season.

=== 2017–19 ===
On July 20, 2017, Thomas signed a two-year deal with Russian club Khimki of the VTB United League and the EuroLeague.

=== 2019–20 ===
On December 23, 2019, Thomas was reported to have signed with Fenerbahçe Beko. He averaged 2.9 points, 3.6 rebounds and 1.1 assists per game in 12 games.

=== 2020–21 ===
On July 28, 2020, he signed a one-year deal with Bayern Munich of the Basketball Bundesliga (BBL) with the option for another season. On December 3, 2020, Thomas and Bayern Munich parted ways.

=== 2021–22 ===
On November 17, 2021, he has signed 1,5 month contract with Petkim Spor of the Turkish Basketball Super League (BSL) with an option to extend until end of season.

=== 2022–23 ===
On August 19, 2022, he has signed with BC Samara of the VTB United League.

=== 2023–24 ===
On December 7, 2023, he signed with ONVO Büyükçekmece of the Basketbol Süper Ligi (BSL).

=== 2024–25 ===
On January 12, 2025, Thomas signed with the Sagesse SC of the Lebanese Basketball League (LBL).

=== The Basketball Tournament (TBT) (2017–present) ===
In the summer of 2017, Thomas played in The Basketball Tournament on ESPN for team A Few Good Men (Gonzaga Alumni). He competed for the $2 million prize, and for team A Few Good Men, he averaged 12.3 points per game and 7.5 rebounds per game. Thomas helped take team A Few Good Men to the Super 16 round, where they then lost to Team Challenge ALS 77–60.

== Career statistics ==
Legend
GP	Games played	GS	Games started	MPG	Minutes per game
FG%	Field goal percentage	3P%	3-point field goal percentage	FT%	Free throw percentage
RPG	Rebounds per game	APG	Assists per game	SPG	Steals per game
BPG	Blocks per game	PPG	Points per game	**Bold**	Career high

=== NBA ===
==== Regular season ====
Year	Team	GP	GS	MPG	FG%	3P%	FT%	RPG	APG	SPG	BPG	PPG
2011–12	San Antonio	3	0	5.0	.000	–	.500	1.0	.3	**.3**	.3	.3
2012–13	Golden State	5	0	4.2	.000	–	**.750**	1.0	**.4**	.0	.2	.6
2012–13	Chicago	7	0	5.1	**.556**	–	.500	1.6	.3	**.3**	.1	1.7
2013–14	San Antonio	1	0	**15.0**	.250	–	.000	**9.0**	.0	.0	**2.0**	2.0
2013–14	Utah Jazz	7	0	6.9	.500	**.250**	–	1.7	.3	.0	.1	1.9
2014–15	Philadelphia	**17**	0	11.6	.452	.000	.692	3.3	**.4**	.2	.1	**2.6**
Career		40	0	8.2	.435	.091	.600	2.4	.4	.2	.2	1.9

==== Playoffs ====
Year	Team	GP	GS	MPG	FG%	3P%	FT%	RPG	APG	SPG	BPG	PPG
2013	Chicago	3	0	2.0	.500	–	.200	1.3	.0	.0	.0	1.0

=== NBA D-League ===
==== Regular season ====
Year	Team	GP	GS	MPG	FG%	3P%	FT%	RPG	APG	SPG	BPG	PPG
2011–12	Austin	4	1	28.0	.548	.000	.375	6.8	1.3	.5	2.5	9.3
2011–12	Los Angeles	**19**	**13**	32.2	**.650**	–	.679	9.3	1.4	.8	2.1	13.7
2011–12	Rio Grande	2	2	40.0	.531	–	.667	11.5	1.5	.5	**4.0**	19.0
2012–13	Santa Cruz	1	1	39.0	.500	–	–	15.0	**4.0**	1.0	1.0	8.0
2012–13	Los Angeles	1	1	**41.0**	.500	–	**.750**	**17.0**	**4.0**	**3.0**	1.0	13.0
2013–14	Austin	10	10	32.7	.570	.364	.600	9.4	3.0	.6	2.4	15.2
2013–14	Los Angeles	2	2	40.0	.622	**.615**	.684	15.5	2.5	2.5	2.0	**33.5**
2015–16	Los Angeles	7	7	34.6	.538	.375	.621	12.0	2.6	.9	2.4	17.7
Career		46	37	33.3	.588	.413	.644	10.2	2.1	.9	2.3	15.2

==== Playoffs ====
Year	Team	GP	GS	MPG	FG%	3P%	FT%	RPG	APG	SPG	BPG	PPG
2012	Los Angeles	7	1	34.7	.611	.500	.750	12.3	2.4	1.1	1.0	17.9

=== College ===
==== Division I ====
*	Led Men's Mountain West Conference

Year	Team	GP	GS	MPG	FG%	3P%	FT%	RPG	APG	SPG	BPG	PPG
2007–08	Pepperdine	32	28	30.2	.514	–	.574	**8.8**	1.6	.6	**2.0**	**12.5**
2009–10	San Diego State	34	33	**31.3**	**.543**	**.400**	.527	7.6	**2.3**	**.9**	1.5	10.9
2010–11	San Diego State	**37***	**37***	30.4	.536	.167	**.642**	8.1	**2.3**	.5	**2.0**	11.4
Career		103	98	30.6	.530	.235	.580	8.2	2.0	.7	1.9	11.6

==== CCCAA ====
Year	Team	FG%	FTM	RPG	BPG	PPG
2008–09	SDCC	.606	178	12.9	3.8	21.1

== Personal life ==
Thomas has a daughter, Mikeala, who was born in 2009.
