= Detlef Schrempf Foundation =

American non-profit organization

- Formation: 1996
- Location: Seattle, Washington
- President: Detlef Schrempf
- Executive-Director: Nicole Morrison
- Website: detlef.com

The Detlef Schrempf Foundation is a non-profit, charitable organization established by former Seattle SuperSonics and Dallas Mavericks basketball player Detlef Schrempf, and his wife, Mari Schrempf.

== History and mission ==
The foundation was established in 1996 by Detlef and Mari Schrempf and, according to Detlef Schrempf, raised $40,000 in its first year. The foundation describes its purpose as being to support "organizations that provide hope, care and assistance to children and families of the Northwest." Between its founding and 2012, the organization had raised and donated $10 million for children's charities, primarily in the Pacific Northwest.

== Activities ==
Fundraisers hosted by the organization include "Taste of Main," an annual food festival held in Bellevue, Washington. Since 1996 the foundation has also organized the Detlef Schrempf Celebrity Golf Classic. The 2015 edition of the golf tournament was held at TPC Snoqualmie Ridge. According to the foundation, charities it has donated money to include Seattle Cancer Care Alliance, Seattle Children's Hospital, Camp Fire of Puget Sound, and Cure Autism Now. In 2014, the organization generated $1,536,880 in revenue. That year, 67-percent of its expenses were used to support its programs while 33-percent was spent on staff salaries and benefits.
