= Detlef Schrempf =

German-American basketball player (born 1963)

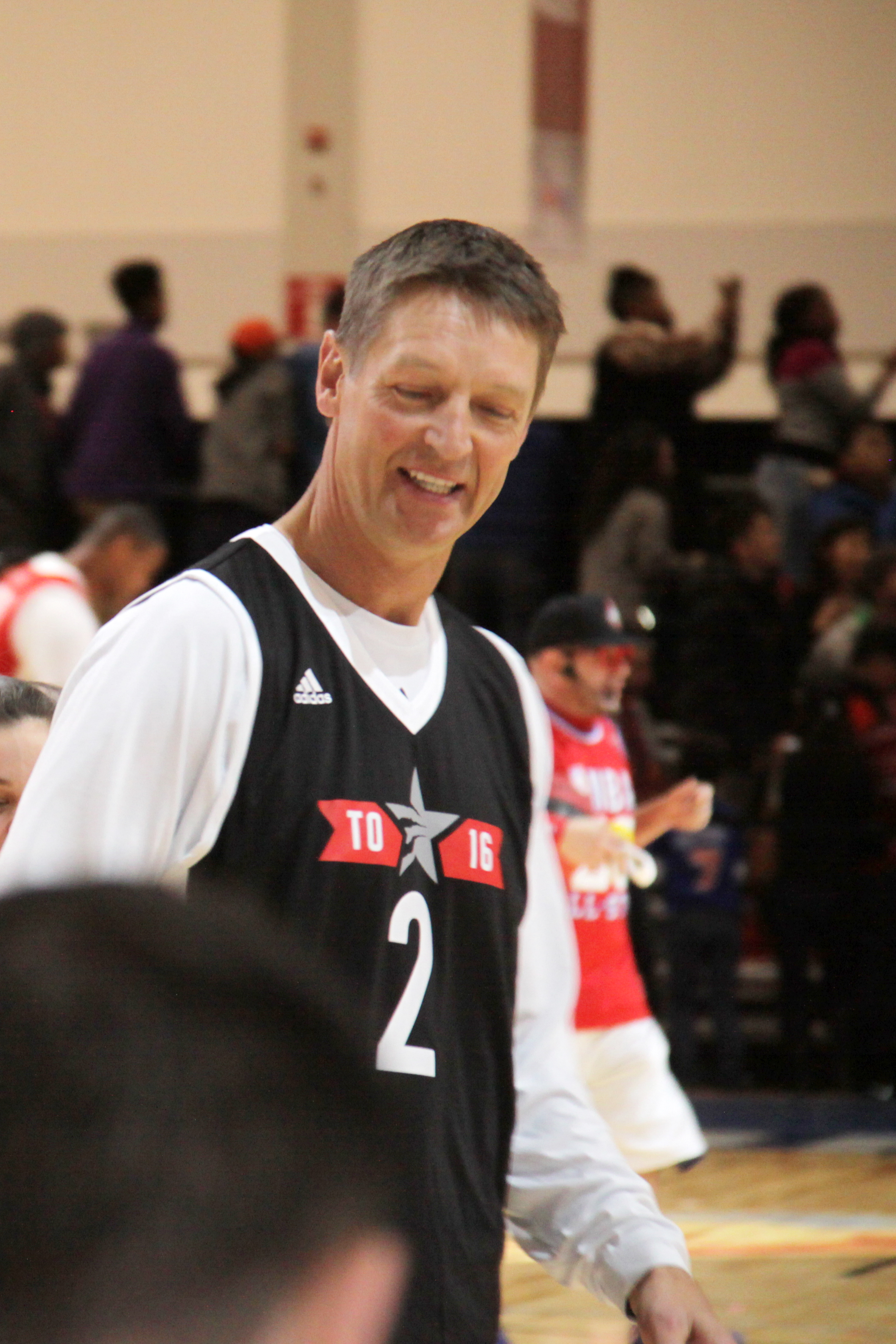
- Schrempf in 2016

Personal information
- Born: January 21, 1963 (age 63) Leverkusen, West Germany
- Listed height: 6 ft 10 in (2.08 m)
- Listed weight: 235 lb (107 kg)

Career information
- High school: Centralia (Centralia, Washington)
- College: Washington (1981–1985)
- NBA draft: 1985: 1st round, 8th overall pick
- Drafted by: Dallas Mavericks
- Playing career: 1985–2001
- Position: Small forward / power forward
- Number: 32, 11, 12
- Coaching career: 2005–2007

Career history

Playing
- 1985–1989: Dallas Mavericks
- 1989–1993: Indiana Pacers
- 1993–1999: Seattle SuperSonics
- 1999–2001: Portland Trail Blazers

Career highlights
- 3× NBA All-Star (1993, 1995, 1997); All-NBA Third Team (1995); 2× NBA Sixth Man of the Year (1991, 1992); German Player of the Year (1992); Third-team All-American – NABC (1985); 2× First-team All-Pac-10 (1984, 1985); No. 22 retired by Washington Huskies

Career NBA statistics
- Points: 15,761 (13.9 ppg)
- Rebounds: 7,023 (6.2 rpg)
- Assists: 3,833 (3.4 apg)
- Stats at NBA.com
- Stats at Basketball Reference
- FIBA Hall of Fame

Detlef Schrempf (born January 21, 1963) is a German-American businessman, philanthropist and former professional basketball player. He played college basketball for the Washington Huskies from 1981 to 1985, and was drafted into the National Basketball Association (NBA) by the Dallas Mavericks in the first round of the 1985 NBA draft, with the eighth overall pick. He was an All-NBA Third Team member in 1995, a three-time NBA All-Star, the first European player ever to achieve this award, and the NBA Sixth Man of the Year twice.

Schrempf played in the NBA for 16 seasons, including stints with the Indiana Pacers, the Seattle SuperSonics, and the Portland Trail Blazers. In 1996, he reached the NBA Finals with the SuperSonics. He played for the West German, and later German, national team in the 1984 and 1992 Summer Olympics and the 1983 and 1985 EuroBasket championships. Schrempf was inducted into the FIBA Hall of Fame in 2021.

== High school and college career ==
Born in Leverkusen, West Germany, Schrempf played for the youth teams of Bayer Leverkusen, before attending Centralia High School in Centralia, Washington, United States, for one year. As a senior, he led the Tigers to the Class AA (now 2A) state championship in 1981, scoring 24 points in the title game, a 52–43 victory over the Timberline Blazers of Lacey. After graduating he enrolled at the University of Washington in Seattle, where he played for the Huskies under head coach Marv Harshman. With Schrempf, the Huskies won Pac-10 regular-season titles in 1984 and 1985 and made three postseason appearances, reaching the Sweet 16 in 1984. He was named team captain for his senior year. In his career at Washington, he scored 1,449 total points.

Schrempf was named to the All-Pac-10 First Team and The Sporting News All-America Second Team. He was inducted into the Husky Hall of Fame in 1995, and was also named to the University of Washington All-Century Team. While attending UW, he was a member of the Phi Delta Theta fraternity and majored in international business.

== NBA career ==
Schrempf was selected eighth overall by the Dallas Mavericks in the 1985 NBA draft. He became a regular in NBA rotations after being traded to the Indiana Pacers for veteran center Herb Williams in February 1989. Playing for the Mavericks, he finished second in the NBA with a .478 three-point percentage in 1986–87, and eventually worked his way into the starting lineup. In 1991 and 1992, he won consecutive NBA Sixth Man Awards. In the 1992–93 season, he was the only player in the NBA to finish in the top 25 in scoring (19.1 ppg), rebounding (9.5 rpg) and assists (6.0 apg), and was the first European selected to play in the NBA All-Star Game, the first of his three appearances.

Following the 1992–93 NBA season, Schrempf was traded to the Seattle SuperSonics for forwards Derrick McKey and Gerald Paddio. He ranked second in the NBA in three-point accuracy during the 1994–95 season with a 51.4 three-point field goal percentage and became leader in the NBA in offensive rating the same season with 127 points per 100 possessions. On a Sonics team that also featured Gary Payton, Shawn Kemp, Sam Perkins, and Hersey Hawkins, Schrempf reached the NBA Finals in 1996, where they lost to Michael Jordan's Chicago Bulls in six games. Schrempf became the first (and one of only four, to date, along with Dirk Nowitzki, Daniel Theis, and Maxi Kleber) German-born NBA player to reach the NBA Finals. While with the Sonics, Schrempf played in the NBA All-Star game in both 1995 and 1997.

Schrempf was released by the Sonics in 1999 and signed the same day by the Portland Trail Blazers, with whom he played until his retirement from professional basketball in 2001, playing in a total of 1,136 regular season games and 114 playoff games.

On January 24, 2006, the Seattle SuperSonics hired Schrempf as an assistant coach under Bob Hill, who had coached Schrempf when he played for the Indiana Pacers.

== National team career ==
Schrempf first appeared for the West Germany national team at the EuroBasket in 1983. He also led the team in scoring during the event at 15.3 ppg. A year later, he led the team to the 1984 Olympics. In 1985, Schrempf helped West Germany to their best finish at the EuroBasket in their history to that point. Seven years later, at the 1992 Olympics, he represented the team for his last international tournament.

== Charitable work ==
Schrempf established the Detlef Schrempf Foundation in 1996 to benefit local charities. In January 2012, he won the Paul Allen Award for Citizenship (formerly the Seattle Sports Commission Sports Citizen of the Year) at the 77th annual Sports Star of the Year banquet in Seattle. His foundation hosts the Detlef Schrempf Celebrity Golf Classic at McCormick Woods Golf Course in Port Orchard, Washington, each summer and has raised about $10 million for children's charities in the Pacific Northwest.

== Personal life ==
Schrempf is married to Mari Schrempf. They have two sons, Alex and Michael. Since 2010, Schrempf has been the Business Development Officer at Coldstream Capital, a wealth management firm in Seattle.

== In popular culture ==
- In 2004, Schrempf appeared in an IBM commercial.
- Schrempf made appearances in two episodes of the German soap opera Gute Zeiten, schlechte Zeiten.
- Schrempf had a cameo appearance in the hit television show Married... with Children.
- "Detlef Schrempf" is the name of a song by the musical group Band of Horses from their 2007 album Cease to Begin.
- He was cited as the "minister of comedy" for Genetically Engineered Superhuman High in an episode of the short-lived MTV series Clone High.
- Schrempf appeared as himself in the documentary "Mania" (2008).
- Schrempf has appeared as himself in three episodes of the sitcom Parks and Recreation, "Telethon" (2010), "Li'l Sebastian" (2011), and "Ron and Tammys" (2011).
- In the show Unbreakable Kimmy Schmidt, Kimmy says in the episode "Kimmy's Roommate Lemonades!" that she had babysat a girl in Indiana named Detlef Schrempf.
- In the Frasier episode “The Kid” (1997), Schrempf's jersey can be seen hanging in Roz's apartment. And in the following episode, "The 1000th Show" (1997), Schrempf's jersey can be seen draped over the producers chair at the KACL station.
- During a 2018 episode of WWE RAW, commentator Renee Young said that Elias had "no respect for Detlef Schrempf" after he had dissed the Seattle Sonics.
- During the Seattle Kraken's reveal for a new mascot, Detlef made an appearance suggesting that Squatch, the former Sonics mascot, should be the mascot. Many Sonics fans were hyped about this, as they believed that the Sonics would be returning to Seattle.

== Career statistics ==
Legend
GP	Games played	GS	Games started	MPG	Minutes per game
FG%	Field goal percentage	3P%	3-point field goal percentage	FT%	Free throw percentage
RPG	Rebounds per game	APG	Assists per game	SPG	Steals per game
BPG	Blocks per game	PPG	Points per game	**Bold**	Career high
*	Led the league

=== NBA statistics ===
==== Regular season ====
Year	Team	GP	GS	MPG	FG%	3P%	FT%	RPG	APG	SPG	BPG	PPG
1985–86	Dallas	64	12	15.1	.451	.429	.724	3.1	1.4	.4	.2	6.2
1986–87	Dallas	81	5	21.1	.472	.478	.742	3.7	2.0	.6	.2	9.3
1987–88	Dallas	**82**	4	19.4	.456	.156	.756	3.4	1.9	.5	.4	8.5
1988–89	Dallas	37	1	22.8	.426	.125	.789	4.5	2.3	.6	.2	9.5
1988–89	Indiana	32	12	31.4	.514	.263	.772	7.2	2.9	.9	.3	14.8
1989–90	Indiana	78	18	33.0	.516	.354	.820	7.9	3.2	.8	.2	16.2
1990–91	Indiana	**82**	3	32.1	.520	.375	.818	8.0	3.7	.7	.3	16.1
1991–92	Indiana	80	4	32.6	**.536**	.324	.828	**9.6**	3.9	.8	**.5**	17.3
1992–93	Indiana	**82**	60	**37.8**	.476	.154	.804	9.5	**6.0**	1.0	.3	19.1
1993–94	Seattle	81	80	33.7	.493	.324	.769	5.6	3.4	.9	.1	15.0
1994–95	Seattle	**82***	**82***	35.2	.523	**.514**	.839	6.2	3.8	**1.1**	.4	**19.2**
1995–96	Seattle	63	60	34.9	.486	.408	.776	5.2	4.4	.9	.1	17.1
1996–97	Seattle	61	60	35.9	.492	.354	.801	6.5	4.4	1.0	.3	16.8
1997–98	Seattle	78	78	35.2	.487	.415	.844	7.1	4.4	.8	.2	15.8
1998–99	Seattle	50*	39	35.3	.472	.395	.823	7.4	3.7	.8	**.5**	15.0
1999–00	Portland	77	6	21.6	.432	.404	.833	4.3	2.6	.5	.2	7.5
2000–01	Portland	26	0	15.3	.411	.375	**.852**	3.0	1.7	.3	.1	4.0
Career		1,136	524	29.6	.491	.384	.803	6.2	3.4	.8	.3	13.9
All-Star		3	0	17.0	.455	.250	.333	3.7	2.3	.0	.3	7.7

==== Playoffs ====
Year	Team	GP	GS	MPG	FG%	3P%	FT%	RPG	APG	SPG	BPG	PPG
1986	Dallas	10	0	12.0	.464	.000	.647	2.3	1.4	.2	.1	3.7
1987	Dallas	4	0	24.3	.371	.000	.455	3.0	1.5	.8	.5	7.8
1988	Dallas	15	0	18.3	.465	.333	.706	3.7	1.6	.5	.5	7.8
1990	Indiana	3	3	**41.7**	.489	.000	**.938**	7.3	1.7	.7	.3	20.3
1991	Indiana	5	0	35.8	.474	.000	.833	7.2	2.2	.4	.0	15.8
1992	Indiana	3	0	40.0	.383	.500	.893	**13.0**	2.3	.7	.3	**21.0**
1993	Indiana	4	4	41.3	.463	.000	.778	5.8	**7.3**	.3	.5	19.5
1994	Seattle	5	5	34.8	.520	.333	.867	5.4	2.0	.2	**.6**	18.6
1995	Seattle	4	4	38.3	.404	.556	.792	4.8	3.0	.8	.5	18.8
1996	Seattle	**21**	**21**	37.6	.475	.368	.750	5.0	3.2	.7	.2	16.0
1997	Seattle	12	12	38.3	.472	.552	.815	5.8	3.4	**1.1**	.1	16.9
1998	Seattle	10	10	37.5	.512	.143	.816	7.7	3.9	.7	.1	16.1
2000	Portland	15	0	18.4	.393	.167	.830	3.5	2.0	.3	.0	5.6
2001	Portland	3	0	10.7	**.667**	**.667**	.667	1.7	.3	.0	.0	4.7
Career		114	59	29.3	.465	.373	.789	5.0	2.6	.5	.2	12.6

=== International statistics ===
Year	Competition	GP	MPG	FG%	3P%	FT%	RPG	APG	SPG	BPG	PPG
1983	EuroBasket										
1984	Olympic Games										
1985	EuroBasket										
1992	Olympic Games										
Career		71									

== See also ==
- List of foreign NBA coaches
