= Kenny Green (basketball, born 1964) =

American basketball player (born 1964)

Personal information
- Born: October 11, 1964 (age 62) Eustis, Florida, U.S.
- Listed height: 6 ft 6 in (1.98 m)
- Listed weight: 210 lb (95 kg)

Career information
- High school: Eustis (Eustis, Florida)
- College: Wake Forest (1982–1985)
- NBA draft: 1985: 1st round, 12th overall pick
- Drafted by: Washington Bullets
- Playing career: 1985–1988
- Position: Small forward
- Number: 21

Career history
- 1985–1986: Washington Bullets
- 1986–1988: Philadelphia 76ers
- 1988: Savannah Spirits
- 1990: Grand Rapids Hoops

Career highlights
- 2× Second-team All-ACC (1984, 1985)
- Stats at NBA.com
- Stats at Basketball Reference

Kenny Green (born October 11, 1964) is an American former professional basketball player who was selected by the Washington Bullets in the first round (12th pick overall) of the 1985 NBA draft, one spot ahead of Hall of Famer Karl Malone. A 6'6" small forward from Wake Forest University, Green played in two NBA seasons from 1985 to 1987. He played for the Bullets and Philadelphia 76ers. In his NBA career, he played in 60 games and scored a total of 265 points. In addition to his stint in the NBA, Green played parts of two seasons in the Continental Basketball Association (CBA). He averaged 12.4 points and 6.1 rebounds in 14 games for the Savannah Spirits and Grand Rapids Hoops.

== Career statistics ==
Legend
GP	Games played	GS	Games started	MPG	Minutes per game
FG%	Field goal percentage	3P%	3-point field goal percentage	FT%	Free throw percentage
RPG	Rebounds per game	APG	Assists per game	SPG	Steals per game
BPG	Blocks per game	PPG	Points per game	**Bold**	Career high

=== NBA ===
==== Regular season ====
Year	Team	GP	GS	MPG	FG%	3P%	FT%	RPG	APG	SPG	BPG	PPG
1985–86	Washington	20	0	**11.1**	**.436**	.000	**.808**	**1.9**	.2	**.2**	**.4**	**5.5**
1985–86	Philadelphia	**21**	0	11.0	.429	–	.609	1.7	.3	.0	.1	4.4
1986–87	Philadelphia	19	0	9.1	.357	–	.737	1.5	**.4**	**.2**	.1	3.4
Career		60	0	10.4	.412	.000	.721	1.7	.3	.2	.2	4.4
