= NBA draft lottery =

Lottery process to determine the order of the NBA draft

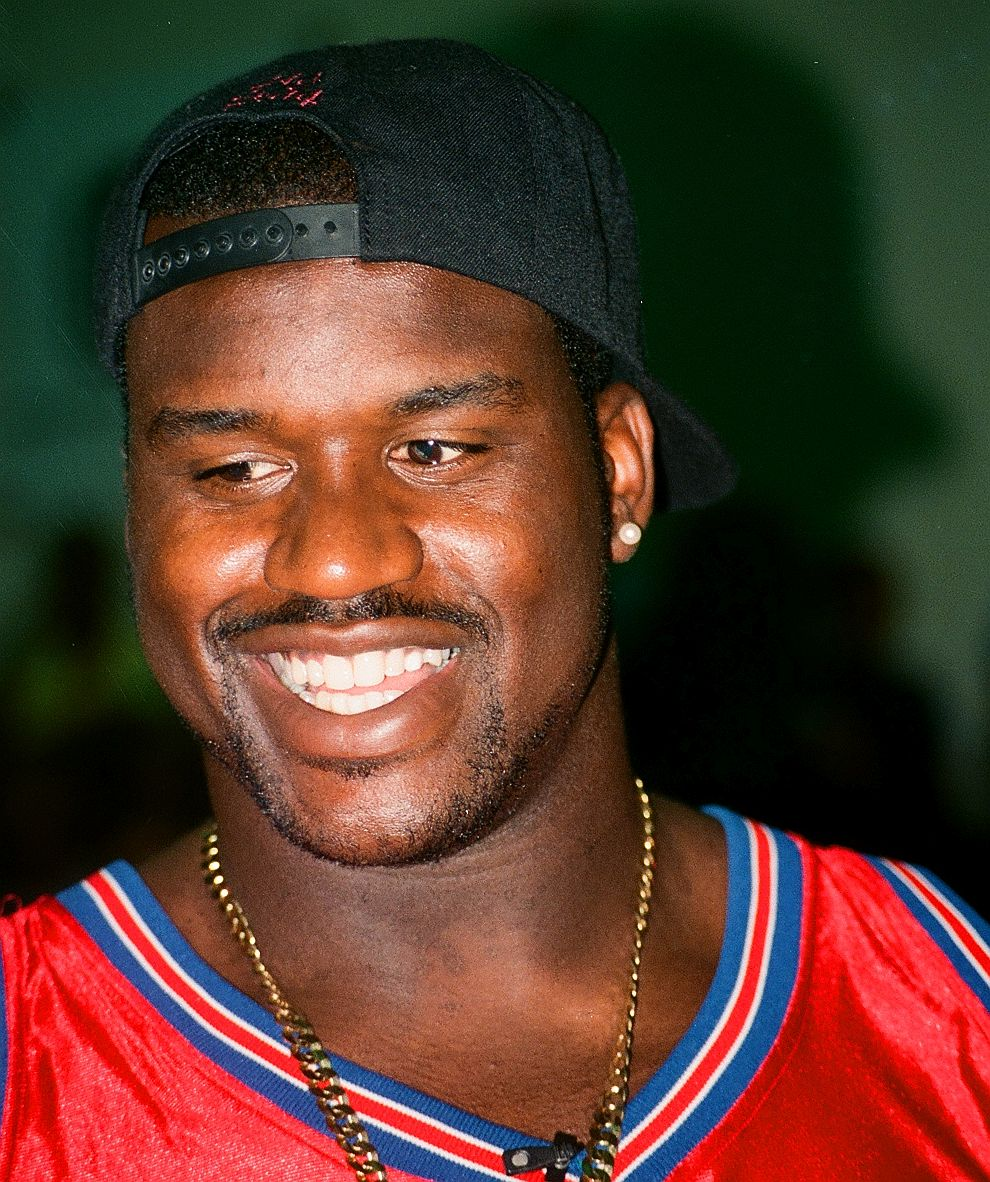
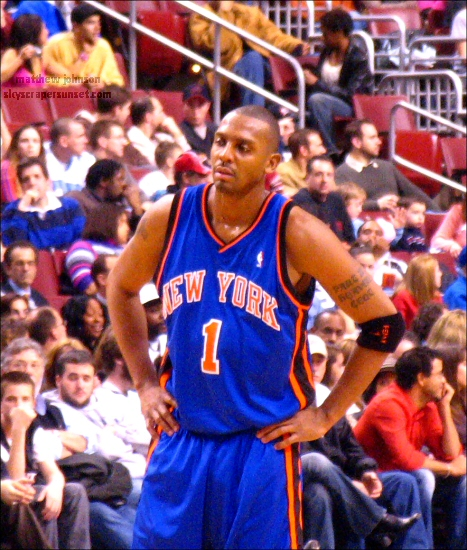
In 1992 and 1993, the Orlando Magic famously received the first overall selection in back-to-back years. In 1992, the Magic would draft Shaquille O'Neal (left). In 1993, the Magic selected Chris Webber first overall but traded Webber's draft rights for Anfernee Hardaway (right).

The NBA draft lottery is an annual event held by the National Basketball Association (NBA), in which the teams who had missed the playoffs the previous year participate in a lottery process to determine the draft order in the NBA draft. The NBA draft lottery started in 1985. In the NBA draft, the teams obtain the rights to amateur U.S. college basketball players and other eligible players, including international players. The lottery winner would get the first selection in the draft. A lottery pick denotes a draft pick whose position is determined through the lottery, while a non-playoff team involved in the process is often called a lottery team.

Under the current rules, only the top four picks are decided by the lottery, and are chosen from the 14 teams that do not make the playoffs. The team with the worst record, or the team that holds the draft rights of the team with the worst record, has the best chance to obtain a higher draft pick. After the top four positions are selected (from the lottery slotting system), the remainder of the first-round draft order is in inverse order of the win–loss record for the remaining teams, or the teams who originally held the rights if they were traded. The lottery does not determine the draft order in the subsequent round of the draft.

After the 2019 draft, the NBA changed the lottery odds (the bottom three teams will all have an equal 14% chance of winning the top pick) and increased the number of teams selected in the lottery from three to four.

== History ==
=== 1947–1965: Territorial picks ===
In the earlier drafts, the teams would draft in reverse order of their win–loss record. However, a special territorial-pick rule allowed a team to draft a player from its local area. If a team decided to use its territorial pick, it forfeited its first-round pick in the draft. The territorial pick, if used, would happen before the first pick in the draft.

=== 1966–1984: Coin flip ===
In 1966, the NBA revamped its draft system and introduced a coin flip between the worst teams in each conference to determine who would obtain the first overall draft pick. The team that lost the coin flip would get the second pick, and the rest of the first-round picks were determined in reverse order of each team's win–loss record.

While the coin flip system gave the worst teams in each conference an equal chance to have the first draft pick, if the two worst teams overall were in the same conference, the second-worst team overall would have no chance of obtaining the first draft pick.

=== 1985–1989: Early lottery system ===
After the 1984 coin flip, which was won by the Houston Rockets (who also won the coin flip in 1983), the NBA introduced the lottery system to counter the accusations that the Rockets and several other teams were tanking by deliberately losing their remaining regular season games in order to secure the worst record and consequently the chance to obtain the first pick. The lottery system involved a random drawing of an envelope from a hopper. Inside each of the envelopes was the name of a non-playoff team. The team whose envelope was drawn first would get the first pick. The process was then repeated until the rest of the lottery picks were determined. In this system, each non-playoff team had an equal chance to obtain the first pick. The rest of the first-round picks were determined in reverse order of the win–loss record.

Starting from 1987, the NBA modified the lottery system so that the first three picks were determined by the lottery. After the three envelopes were drawn, the remaining non-playoff teams would select in reverse order of their win–loss record. This meant that the team with the worst record could receive no worse than the fourth selection, and the second-worst team could pick no lower than fifth, and so on.

The New York Knicks were the first winner of the lottery in 1985. They selected Georgetown University standout Patrick Ewing with their first overall pick. However, speculation arose that the NBA had rigged the lottery so that the Knicks would be assured to get the first pick. Even though the envelope system was highly criticized, it was used until 1989 before being replaced by the weighted lottery system in 1990.

=== 1990–2026: Weighted lottery system ===
In 1990, the NBA changed the format of the lottery to give the team with the worst record the best chance of landing the first pick. The worst non-playoff team that season would have 11 chances, out of 66, to obtain the first pick. The second worst would have 10 chances, and so on. Similarly to the previous system, the weighted lottery system was also used only to determine the first three picks, while the rest of the teams selected in reverse order of their win–loss records.

Despite the weighted odds, the Orlando Magic managed to win the lottery in 1993 with only one chance to obtain the first pick as it was the best non-playoff team in the previous season. In October 1993, the NBA modified the lottery system to give the team with the worst record a higher chance to win the draft lottery and to decrease the better teams' chances to win. The new system increased the chances of the worst team obtaining the first pick in the draft from 16.7 percent to 25 percent, while decreasing the chances of the best non-playoff team from 1.5 percent to 0.5 percent.

In the new system, 14 numbered table tennis balls were used. Then, a four-number combination from the 14 balls were drawn to determine the lottery winner. Prior to the draft, the NBA assigns 1,000 possible combinations to the non-playoff teams (the 11–12–13–14 combination is ignored and redrawn). The process was then repeated to determine the second and third pick. The table below shows the lottery chances and the probabilities for each team to win the first pick in the weighted lottery system in 1993 and 1994 drafts.

In 2014, the NBA Board of Governors voted on a proposed reform to the lottery. If the proposed changes passed, the four worst teams in the league would have been given identical odds (around 11 percent) at winning the top pick. The fifth team would have a 10 percent chance and the odds would decrease for each team picking after. The proposed changes were designed to disincentivize having the worst record in the league (at the time, the worst team was given a 25% chance at the top pick) and keep teams competitive throughout the entire season. The final vote was 17–13 in favor of the reform, short of the 23 votes in favor required to push the change through.

In 2016, Dikembe Mutombo made people question the draft's legitimacy when he prematurely tweeted a congratulatory message to the Philadelphia 76ers for receiving the first pick hours before the lottery was conducted. Philadelphia did indeed win the first overall pick. Further questions were raised when the NBA draft revealed that every spot remained exactly the same as it was before the event took place, which was the first occurrence in draft lottery history. A year later, Lakers executive Magic Johnson raised even further questions about the draft process with him assuring head coach Luke Walton that the Lakers would acquire a top-3 pick for the 2017 NBA draft after an interview Walton had on May 4, 2017, twelve days before the draft lottery commenced and moved up to the second pick.

In response to teams like the Philadelphia 76ers deliberately seeking high-loss season records in order to improve their draft odds, beginning with the 2019 NBA draft the NBA implemented a new lottery system giving the worst three teams equal odds at the first overall pick and expanding the lottery to the top four picks (up from the top three picks). As with the changes proposed in 2014, these changes were intended to disincentivize high-loss seasons by flattening the odds of getting the top pick and increasing the likelihood of the worst teams having to pick later in the draft.

	1993 draft lottery				1994 draft lottery			
	Team	1992–93 record	Chances (out of 66)	Probability	Team	1993–94 record	Chances (out of 1,000)	Probability
1	Dallas	11–71	11	16.67%	Dallas	13–69	250	25.00%
2	Minnesota	19–63	10	15.15%	Detroit	20–62	164	16.40%
3	Washington	22–60	9	13.64%	Minnesota	20–62	164	16.40%
4	Sacramento	25–57	8	12.12%	Milwaukee	20–62	163	16.30%
5	Philadelphia	26–56	7	10.61%	Washington	24–58	94	9.40%
6	Milwaukee	28–54	6	9.09%	Philadelphia	25–57	66	6.60%
7	Golden State	34–48	5	7.58%	L.A. Clippers	27–55	44	4.40%
8	Denver	36–46	4	6.06%	Sacramento	28–54	27	2.70%
9	Miami	36–46	3	4.55%	Boston	32–50	15	1.50%
10	Detroit	40–42	2	3.03%	L.A. Lakers	33–49	8	0.80%
11	Orlando	41–41	1	1.52%	Charlotte	41–41	5	0.50%

In 1995, the NBA had an agreement with the two expansion franchises, the Toronto Raptors and the Vancouver Grizzlies that neither team would be eligible to obtain the first overall pick in the 1996, 1997 and 1998 drafts. The Raptors won the 1996 lottery but were forced to settle for the second pick. Another combination was drawn and resulted in the Philadelphia 76ers getting the first pick. Two years later, the Grizzlies won the lottery and likewise had to pick second in the draft, while the L.A. Clippers obtained the first pick. The Raptors did not pick first until 2006, when they won the lottery as the fifth-worst non-playoff team. The Grizzlies have yet to hold the first selection.

=== Starting in 2027: 3-2-1 format ===
In 2027, the NBA will implement the "3-2-1 format", aiming to disincentivize tanking by expanding the lottery to 16 teams and reducing the odds of the teams with the worst records receiving the first overall pick. All teams that failed to reach the playoffs or the play-in tournament will receive three lottery balls, except the three teams with the worst overall records will be considered “draft relegated” and lose one ball, thus only receiving two. However, those three teams are guaranteed to pick within the top twelve to compensate for the penalty, whereas all remaining 13 others can fall down to 16th. The four teams that secure the ninth and tenth seeds in the play-in tournament will receive two lottery balls. Lastly, the two teams that lose in the play-in games between the seventh seed and the eighth seed will receive one lottery ball, both provisionally. However, any play-in team that makes the playoffs graduate out of the lottery completely.

The new format will also forbid teams from winning the first overall pick in consecutive drafts. It will also forbid teams from winning a top-five pick in three consecutive drafts. Additionally, protecting picks from the 12th pick to the 15th pick will no longer be allowed.

== Process ==
The lottery is normally held in the first or second round of the NBA Playoffs, typically during the first or second round of the main playoffs in May.

The pool of lottery contestants consists of the teams who failed to qualify for that season's postseason. Since the expansion of postseason from 16 to 20 teams with a Page-McIntyre tournament to eliminate four teams, the four teams eliminated in the Page-McIntyre system are also draft lottery eligible. They are seeded in order from worst record to best, with each team's seed determining the odds it will have of winning one of the top four draft picks.

The winners of the top four picks are determined by the following process, beginning with the first draft pick. Fourteen ping pong balls numbered 1–14 are placed in a standard lottery machine and four balls are randomly selected one at a time from the lot. The balls are placed in the machine for 20 seconds to randomize before the first ball is drawn. The remaining three balls are drawn after remixing for 10 seconds. Just as in most traditional lotteries, the order in which the numbers are drawn is immaterial; e.g., a drawing of 1–2–3–4 in that order is the same as 4–1–3–2.

There are a total of 1,001 possible combinations of four balls numbered 1 through 14, with one combination (balls 11–12–13–14, regardless of order) being deemed invalid: the balls are redrawn if this combination is drawn.

The remaining 1,000 combinations are distributed amongst the lottery contestants according to their seed's assigned odds. For example, because each of the top 3 seeds has a 14% chance of winning the top pick, they are each assigned 140 of the 1,000 possible winning combinations.

The balls drawn in determining each of the first four picks are returned to the lottery machine and can be drawn again. However, a team generally cannot win multiple picks, so the drawing of a combination assigned to a team who has already won a pick will be ignored and redrawn.

The exception to this rule applies where the winner of the lottery pick acquired the pick via trade. When a lottery team trades its first pick to another team, the recipient of the pick assumes the seed "earned" by the original owner of the pick, unless the terms of the trade provide otherwise. When a lottery team trades its first pick to another team that missed the playoffs, the recipient receives the seed of the team who traded it away as well as the seed determined by its own record (unless it also traded its first pick). This is the only situation in which a team can win multiple lottery picks. Trades are also the only way in which postseason teams can win a lottery pick; however, with the play-in tournament, the four teams eliminated in the first stage of postseason can win a lottery pick, meaning in theory a team as high as the No. 7 seed in a conference could hold a lottery pick (provided they lose both the 7–8 game and the loser vs winner of 9–10 game); the 2024 Atlanta Hawks, which lost the first stage 9–10 game, were the first team to make the postseason and be one of the four teams eliminated in the first stage tournament to win a lottery pick.

The lottery is conducted with witnesses (from the accounting firm Ernst & Young) auditing the process to verify that it is conducted in accordance with the rules. For the sake of transparency, the NBA also allows several media members in the drawing room.

Prior to the 2019 draft, after the first three teams had been determined, the remaining picks were determined by regular season record with the worst teams getting the highest picks: this assured each team that it could drop no more than three spots from its projected draft position.

Since the 2019 draft, the number of lottery winners was increased from 3 to 4, with the remaining picks still assigned based on regular-season record, meaning a team can drop no more than four spots from its seeded position to its actual draft position.

== Chances of winning ==
From 2019 to 2026, the odds of each seed winning the first pick were:

1. 140 combinations, 14.0% chance of receiving the No. 1 pick
2. 140 combinations, 14.0% chance
3. 140 combinations, 14.0% chance
4. 125 combinations, 12.5% chance
5. 105 combinations, 10.5% chance
6. 90 combinations, 9.0% chance
7. 75 combinations, 7.5% chance
8. 60 combinations, 6.0% chance
9. 45 combinations, 4.5% chance
10. 30 combinations, 3.0% chance
11. 20 combinations, 2.0% chance
12. 15 combinations, 1.5% chance
13. 10 combinations, 1.0% chance
14. 5 combinations, 0.5% chance

The following table lists the chance for each seed to get specific picks, from 2019 to 2026, if there were no ties.

Seed	Chances	1st	2nd	3rd	4th	5th	6th	7th	8th	9th	10th	11th	12th	13th	14th
1	140	14.00%	13.42%	12.75%	11.97%	47.86%									
2	140	14.00%	13.42%	12.75%	11.97%	27.84%	20.02%								
3	140	14.00%	13.42%	12.75%	11.97%	14.84%	26.00%	7.02%							
4	125	12.50%	12.23%	11.89%	11.46%	7.24%	25.74%	16.74%	2.19%						
5	105	10.50%	10.54%	10.56%	10.53%	2.22%	19.61%	26.74%	8.68%	0.62%					
6	90	9.00%	9.20%	9.41%	9.62%	-	8.62%	29.77%	20.55%	3.68%	0.15%				
7	75	7.50%	7.80%	8.14%	8.52%	-	-	19.72%	34.11%	12.88%	1.30%	0.03%			
8	60	6.00%	6.34%	6.74%	7.22%	-	-	-	34.47%	32.10%	6.75%	0.38%	<0.01%		
9	45	4.50%	4.83%	5.23%	5.71%	-	-	-	-	50.72%	25.90%	3.01%	0.09%	<0.01%	
10	30	3.00%	3.27%	3.60%	4.01%	-	-	-	-	-	65.90%	18.99%	1.20%	0.02%	<0.01%
11	20	2.00%	2.20%	2.45%	2.76%	-	-	-	-	-	-	77.59%	12.60%	0.40%	<0.01%
12	15	1.50%	1.66%	1.86%	2.10%	-	-	-	-	-	-	-	86.10%	6.70%	0.07%
13	10	1.00%	1.11%	1.25%	1.43%	-	-	-	-	-	-	-	-	92.88%	2.34%
14	5	0.50%	0.56%	0.63%	0.72%	-	-	-	-	-	-	-	-	-	97.59%

In the event that teams finish with the same record, each tied team receives the average of the total number of combinations for the positions that they occupy. Should the average number not be an integer, a coin flip is then used to determine which team or teams receive the extra combination. The result of the coin flip is also used to determine who receives the earlier pick in the event that neither of the tied teams wins one of the first four picks via the lottery. For example, in 2020, the New Orleans Pelicans and the Sacramento Kings tied for the 12th-worst record (due to the COVID-19 suspension of the 2019–20 NBA season, only the record as of March 12, 2020 was considered for lottery purposes). The average of the 12th and 13th positions in the lottery was taken, resulting in each team getting 12 combinations (the average of 15 and 10). A coin flip was used to break the tie for the lottery position and assign the extra lottery combination. Sacramento won, giving them the 12th-best lottery odds and New Orleans 13th best. They received the 12th and 13th picks, respectively, after neither was drawn in the lottery. The order was reversed in the second round as New Orleans received the 42nd pick and Sacramento the 43rd.

== Lottery ceremony ==
External videos
- 2023 NBA Draft Lottery Drawing (actual drawing of the ping-pong balls). NBA's official YouTube channel. May 16, 2023.
- 2023 NBA Draft Lottery results (televised ceremony of the order). NBA's official YouTube channel. May 16, 2023.

The drawing of the ping-pong balls is conducted in private, though observed by independent auditors, representatives from each team, and select media members. The results are subsequently presented in a televised unveiling (formerly broadcast as a short ceremony prior to or during halftime of an NBA playoff game, but since the mid-2010s, presented as an hour-long special by ESPN), in which the order of the lottery is announced in reverse order, from the fourteenth selection to the first. (This differs from the actual drawing, in which the order is announced from first to fourth.) Representatives from each lottery team are present at the lottery ceremony.

The decision of not showing the ping-pong balls live has fueled speculation that the NBA occasionally fixes the draft lottery if it can benefit the league. The speculation originated with the 1985 draft lottery that sent Patrick Ewing to New York, with the theory being that the NBA wanted to send the best player in the draft to New York to increase ratings in a large television market. At that time, the NBA used seven envelopes in a tumbler representing the seven teams with the worst record. Some have speculated that the envelope containing the Knicks logo was refrigerated beforehand, enabling David Stern to recognize and select it. Afterward, the Draft Lottery Format was changed to the current ping-pong ball lottery in a private room with team representatives. However, conspiracy theories still persist regarding the annual outcome of the lottery.

== Lottery winners ==
Visual representation of the following table

The largest upset in the lottery occurred in 1993 when the Magic won the lottery with just a 1.5% chance to win. The second-largest upsets occurred in 2008 and 2014 when the Chicago Bulls and Cleveland Cavaliers both won their respective lotteries with just a 1.7% chance. In 1999, the Charlotte Hornets also overcame long odds in the draft lottery when they won the third pick despite having the best record among all non-playoff teams. The Hornets only had a 1.83% chance of winning a top-three pick. Since the lottery was introduced in 1985, only 21 of 30 worst NBA teams have won the lottery. The Los Angeles Clippers have won five lotteries, although two of them were conveyed to other teams in trades prior to the lottery. The Magic rank second, having held the first overall pick four times. The Cavaliers, Brooklyn Nets and San Antonio Spurs are third with three lottery wins each. Since the weighted lottery system was introduced in 1990, only seven teams with the worst record went on to win the lottery while only four teams with the second-worst record have won the lottery. In 1999, the Bulls became the only team to win the draft lottery after winning the NBA Finals in the previous season (having done so in 1998).

Since the introduction of the draft lottery in 1985, seven teams have never won the first pick neither via lottery or trade: the Denver Nuggets, Indiana Pacers, Los Angeles Lakers, Memphis Grizzlies (joined as expansion team in 1995; previously located in Vancouver), Miami Heat (joined as expansion team in 1988), Oklahoma City Thunder (formerly Seattle SuperSonics), and Utah Jazz. Furthermore, the Boston Celtics have never won the lottery with their own pick, but did own the #1 pick in the 2017 draft at the time of the lottery via a previous trade with the Brooklyn Nets, before subsequently trading that pick to the Philadelphia 76ers a few days before the draft.

Year	Team	Previous season record	Lottery chances	Probability	Player selected
1985	New York Knicks	24–58 (3rd worst)	1 (out of 7)	14.29% (Note: From 1985 to 1988, each of the 7 non-playoff teams had an equal chance to win the lottery, i.e. 14.29%.)	Patrick Ewing
1986	Los Angeles Clippers (conveyed to the Cleveland Cavaliers via Philadelphia 76ers) (Note: The Philadelphia 76ers obtained Los Angeles Clippers' first-round pick in a previous trade on October 6, 1979 that sent Joe Bryant to the Clippers. On June 16, 1986, after the lottery and a day before the draft, the 76ers traded the first pick to the Cleveland Cavaliers in exchange for Roy Hinson.)	32–50 (7th worst)	1 (out of 7)	14.29%	Brad Daugherty
1987	San Antonio Spurs	28–54 (4th worst)	1 (out of 7)	14.29%	David Robinson
1988	Los Angeles Clippers	17–65 (worst)	1 (out of 7)	14.29%	Danny Manning
1989	Sacramento Kings	27–55 (6th worst)	1 (out of 9)	11.11% (Note: In 1989, each of the 9 non-playoff teams had an equal chance to win the lottery, i.e. 11.11%.)	Pervis Ellison
1990	New Jersey Nets	17–65 (worst)	11 (out of 66)	16.67%	Derrick Coleman
1991	Charlotte Hornets	26–56 (5th worst)	7 (out of 66)	10.61%	Larry Johnson
1992	Orlando Magic	21–61 (2nd worst)	10 (out of 66)	15.15%	Shaquille O'Neal
1993	Orlando Magic (conveyed to Golden State on draft night)	41–41 (11th worst)	1 (out of 66)	1.52%	Chris Webber
1994	Milwaukee Bucks	20–62 (T–2nd worst)	163 (out of 1,000)	16.30%	Glenn Robinson
1995	Golden State Warriors	26–56 (5th worst)	94 (out of 1,000)	9.40%	Joe Smith
1996	Philadelphia 76ers	18–64 (2nd worst)	200 (out of 593) (Note: The Toronto Raptors and the Vancouver Grizzlies were not eligible to win the lottery in 1996, 1997 and 1998 due to their expansion agreement. Therefore, their lottery combinations for the first pick were excluded.)	33.73%	Allen Iverson
1997	San Antonio Spurs	20–62 (3rd worst)	157 (out of 727)	21.60%	Tim Duncan
1998	Los Angeles Clippers	17–65 (3rd worst)	157 (out of 696)	22.56%	Michael Olowokandi
1999	Chicago Bulls	13–37 (Note: Due to the 1998–99 NBA lockout, the season was shortened to 50 games per team.) (3rd worst)	157 (out of 1,000)	15.70%	Elton Brand
2000	New Jersey Nets	31–51 (7th worst)	44 (out of 1,000)	4.40%	Kenyon Martin
2001	Washington Wizards	19–63 (3rd worst)	157 (out of 1,000)	15.70%	Kwame Brown
2002	Houston Rockets	28–54 (5th worst)	89 (out of 1,000)	8.90%	Yao Ming
2003	Cleveland Cavaliers	17–65 (T–worst)	225 (out of 1,000)	22.50%	LeBron James
2004	Orlando Magic	21–61 (worst)	250 (out of 1,000)	25.00%	Dwight Howard
2005	Milwaukee Bucks	30–52 (6th worst)	63 (out of 1,000)	6.30%	Andrew Bogut
2006	Toronto Raptors	27–55 (5th worst)	88 (out of 1,000)	8.80%	Andrea Bargnani
2007	Portland Trail Blazers	32–50 (6th worst)	53 (out of 1,000)	5.30%	Greg Oden
2008	Chicago Bulls	33–49 (9th worst)	17 (out of 1,000)	1.70%	Derrick Rose
2009	Los Angeles Clippers	19–63 (T–2nd worst) (Note: The Los Angeles Clippers and the Washington Wizards had identical 19–63 records for 2nd-worst record in the NBA. However, the Wizards won the tiebreaker and were awarded one extra lottery combination.)	177 (out of 1,000)	17.70%	Blake Griffin
2010	Washington Wizards	26–56 (5th worst)	103 (out of 1,000)	10.30%	John Wall
2011	Los Angeles Clippers (conveyed to the Cleveland Cavaliers) (Note: The Cleveland Cavaliers had two lottery picks, their own pick and the Los Angeles Clippers' pick. The Cavaliers obtained the Clippers' first-round pick from a previous trade on February 24, 2011 that sent Mo Williams and Jamario Moon to the Clippers and Baron Davis to the Cavaliers. The Cavaliers, who had the second-worst record (19–63), had a combined total of 227 chances (22.7%) to win the lottery, which consists of 199 chances (19.9%) from their own pick and 28 chances (2.8%) from the Clippers' pick.)	32–50 (8th worst)	28 (out of 1,000)	2.80%	Kyrie Irving
2012	New Orleans Hornets	21–45 (Note: Due to the 2011 NBA lockout, the season was shortened to 66 games per team.) (T–3rd worst)	137 (out of 1,000)	13.70%	Anthony Davis
2013	Cleveland Cavaliers	24–58 (3rd worst)	156 (out of 1,000)	15.60%	Anthony Bennett
2014	Cleveland Cavaliers (later traded to Minnesota before playing)	33–49 (9th worst)	17 (out of 1,000)	1.70%	Andrew Wiggins
2015	Minnesota Timberwolves	16–66 (worst)	250 (out of 1,000)	25.00%	Karl-Anthony Towns
2016	Philadelphia 76ers	10–72 (worst)	250 (out of 1,000)	25.00%	Ben Simmons
2017	Brooklyn Nets (conveyed to the Philadelphia 76ers via the Boston Celtics)	20–62 (worst)	250 (out of 1,000)	25.00%	Markelle Fultz
2018	Phoenix Suns	21–61 (worst)	250 (out of 1,000)	25.00%	Deandre Ayton
2019	New Orleans Pelicans	33–49 (T–7th worst)	60 (out of 1,000)	6.00%	Zion Williamson
2020	Minnesota Timberwolves	19–45 (Note: Due to the ongoing COVID-19 pandemic, the season was suspended in March 2020 and later restarted in July. Teams that were not invited to the NBA Bubble, Minnesota among them, played between 63 and 67 games until the suspension.) (3rd worst)	140 (out of 1,000)	14.00%	Anthony Edwards
2021	Detroit Pistons	20–52 (Note: Due to the ongoing COVID-19 pandemic, the season was shortened to 72 games.) (2nd worst)	140 (out of 1,000)	14.00%	Cade Cunningham
2022	Orlando Magic	22–60 (2nd worst)	140 (out of 1,000)	14.00%	Paolo Banchero
2023	San Antonio Spurs	22–60 (T–2nd worst)	140 (out of 1,000)	14.00%	Victor Wembanyama
2024	Atlanta Hawks	36–46 (10th worst)	30 (out of 1,000)	3.00%	Zaccharie Risacher
2025	Dallas Mavericks	39–43 (11th worst)	18 (out of 1,000)	1.80%	Cooper Flagg
2026	Washington Wizards	17–65 (worst)	140 (out of 1,000)	14.00%	AJ Dybantsa
