= Jim Deines =

American basketball player (born 1962)

James Arnold Deines
- Born: September 26, 1962 (age 63); Springdale, Arkansas
- Occupation: basketball player.

James Arnold Deines (born September 26, 1962, in Springdale, Arkansas) is a former basketball player. He is listed at 6'9" and played forward/center for the Arizona State University Sun Devils. He entered the 1985 NBA draft and was drafted by the Los Angeles Clippers in the 4th round (74th overall pick); however, he never got to play in the NBA. Deines instead played professionally in France for eighteen years. He became a naturalized French citizen in 1987 and was on the roster of the French National Team that placed fourth in the 1991 FIBA European Basketball Championship. After retiring from basketball, Deines and his family moved to the United States.

== Notable awards ==
- LNB Championship (1991) with Olympique Antibes
