= Dwayne McClain =

American basketball player (born 1963)

Personal information
- Born: February 7, 1963 (age 63) Worcester, Massachusetts, U.S.
- Listed height: 6 ft 6 in (1.98 m)
- Listed weight: 185 lb (84 kg)

Career information
- High school: Holy Name (Worcester, Massachusetts)
- College: Villanova (1981–1985)
- NBA draft: 1985: 2nd round, 27th overall pick
- Drafted by: Indiana Pacers
- Playing career: 1985–1997
- Position: Small forward
- Number: 44

Career history
- 1985–1986: Indiana Pacers
- 1986–1987: SLUC Nancy
- 1987–1988: Caen
- 1988: New Haven Skyhawks
- 1988–1989: Rockford Lightning
- 1989–1990: La Crosse Catbirds
- 1991–1993: Sydney Kings
- 1993–1994: Milon B.C.
- 1996: Gold Coast Rollers
- 1997: Brisbane Bullets

Career highlights
- CBA champion (1990); CBA All-Star Game MVP (1989); USBL champion (1988); All-NBL First Team (1992); All-NBL Second Team (1991); All-NBL Third Team (1993); NCAA champion (1985); 2× Second-team All-Big East (1984, 1985)
- Stats at NBA.com
- Stats at Basketball Reference

Dwayne Eddie McClain (born February 7, 1963) is an American former professional basketball player who was selected by the Indiana Pacers in the second round (27th pick overall) of the 1985 NBA draft.

He played in the NBA for one season and was drafted from Villanova University. As a member of the Pacers during the 1985–86 season, he averaged 3.5 points in 45 games played. McClain was a member of Villanova's National Championship team in 1985. He was the highest scorer which helped to secure the “Cinderella Upset” over Georgetown Hoyas.

McClain played in the Continental Basketball Association (CBA) for the Savannah Spirits, New Haven Skyhawks, Rockford Lightning and La Crosse Catbirds from 1987 to 1991. He was selected as the CBA All-Star Game Most Valuable Player in 1989.

McClain also played professionally in France, Canada, the Philippines, Indonesia and Greece before finishing his career in Australia.

McClain had a career in Australia in the National Basketball League (NBL) during the early 1990s. He started in Australia in 1991 with the Sydney Kings, staying with the team until the end of 1993. After three years away he returned to the NBL for a season with the Gold Coast Rollers in 1996, followed by his last season in Australia in 1997 with the Brisbane Bullets. McClain's record in Australia saw him just miss out on a place on the NBL's 25th Anniversary Team, being the third alternate in voting. He played 105 games in the NBL, averaging 25.4 points, 6.8 rebounds and 5 assists per game.

He was the most valuable player (MVP) of the 1989 Continental Basketball Association All-Star Game.

On October 10, 2013, McClain was named in the Sydney Kings 25th Anniversary Team.

== Career statistics ==
Legend
GP	Games played	GS	Games started	MPG	Minutes per game
FG%	Field goal percentage	3P%	3-point field goal percentage	FT%	Free throw percentage
RPG	Rebounds per game	APG	Assists per game	SPG	Steals per game
BPG	Blocks per game	PPG	Points per game	**Bold**	Career high

=== NBA ===
==== Regular season ====
Year	Team	GP	GS	MPG	FG%	3P%	FT%	RPG	APG	SPG	BPG	PPG
1985–86	Indiana	45	4	10.2	.383	.111	.514	.7	1.5	.8	.1	3.5
