= Ivan Daniels =

American basketball player (born 1963)

Personal information
- Born: February 8, 1963 (age 63) Chicago, Illinois
- Listed height: 6 ft 10 in (2.08 m)
- Listed weight: 235 lb (107 kg)

Career information
- High school: Lake Park High School (Roselle, Illinois)
- College: UIC (1981–1985)
- NBA draft: 1985: 5th round, 111th overall pick
- Drafted by: Indiana Pacers
- Position: Center

Career history
- 1985: Tonego '65
- 1987: Newcastle Falcons
- Stats at Basketball Reference

Ivan Daniels (born February 8, 1963) is an American former professional basketball player. He was 6 feet 10 inches (2.08 m), 235 pounds (107 kg) and played the center position.

== College ==
Daniels played four seasons of college basketball for University of Illinois at Chicago. He was a key member of the 1983–84 UIC team that won the Association of Mid-Continent Universities Conference regular season title and set a then-school record with 22 victories. During his senior year, Daniels averaged 17.7 points per game.

== Playing career ==
After his college career, Daniels was drafted by the Indiana Pacers in the 5th round of the 1985 NBA draft. He was cut by the Pacers before the start of the season and went on to play professionally with, among others, Tonego '65 in the Dutch Basketball League during the 1985–1986 season and the Newcastle Falcons of the Australian National Basketball League during the 1987 NBL season.
