= Malcolm Thomas (basketball, born 1963) =

American basketball player

Malcolm Thomas (born c. 1963) is a former college basketball player. He is listed at 6' 7" and played forward/guard for the University of Missouri (1983–1985).

Thomas first began playing collegiate basketball at Moberly (Mo.) Junior College (1981–1983) where he was named Outstanding Player by the National Junior College Tournament in 1983. He chose to transfer to Mizzou where he led the Tigers in scoring (17.4 ppg), field goal percentage (.530), rebounds (8.2 rpg) and blocks (37 total) in his senior year there. Thomas was named first team All Conference and an honorable mention All-American. He was later selected in the sixth round (121st pick overall) of the 1985 NBA draft by the Los Angeles Clippers; however, he did not make the roster and never played in the NBA.

Thomas has a son, also named Malcolm Thomas, who plays professional basketball.

== Career statistics ==
Legend
GP	Games played	GS	Games started	MPG	Minutes per game
FG%	Field goal percentage	3P%	3-point field goal percentage	FT%	Free throw percentage
RPG	Rebounds per game	APG	Assists per game	SPG	Steals per game
BPG	Blocks per game	PPG	Points per game	**Bold**	Career high

=== College ===
Year	Team	GP	GS	MPG	FG%	FT%	RPG	APG	SPG	BPG	PPG
1983–84	Missouri	27	24	33.6	.518	.580	**9.0**	**.7**	.5	.4	16.4
1984–85	Missouri	**32**	**30**	**33.9**	**.541**	**.684**	7.5	**.7**	**1.1**	**.8**	**17.4**
Career		59	54	33.7	.530	.634	8.2	.7	.8	.6	17.0
