= 1985 NBA draft =

Basketball player selection

1985 NBA Draft

General information
- Sport: Basketball
- Date: June 18, 1985
- Location: Felt Forum, Madison Square Garden (New York City, New York)
- Network: TBS Superstation

Overview
- 162 total selections in 7 rounds
- League: NBA
- First selection: Patrick Ewing (New York Knicks)
- Hall of Famers: 5: C Patrick Ewing; SF Chris Mullin; PF Karl Malone; SG Joe Dumars; C Arvydas Sabonis

The 1985 NBA draft took place on June 18, 1985. It was also the first NBA draft of the "lottery" era. It was also around this time where the league decreased the amount of rounds the draft spent, with the previous few years lasting up to 10 rounds total. A total of 162 players were selected over seven rounds by the league's 23 teams.

The New York Knicks were awarded the first overall pick by winning the first-ever NBA draft lottery, which was held in May of that year. The Knicks used it on Georgetown's Patrick Ewing. In addition to Ewing, this draft also resulted in several Hall of Famers, including Karl Malone taken by the Utah Jazz at pick 13.

== Draft selections ==
PG	Point guard	SG	Shooting guard	SF	Small forward	PF	Power forward	C	Center

^	Denotes player who has been inducted to the Naismith Memorial Basketball Hall of Fame
*	Denotes player who has been selected for at least one All-Star Game and All-NBA Team
^{+}	Denotes player who has been selected for at least one All-Star Game
^{x}	Denotes player who has been selected for at least one All-NBA Team
^{#}	Denotes player who has never appeared in an NBA regular-season or playoff game
^{~}	Denotes player who has been selected as Rookie of the Year

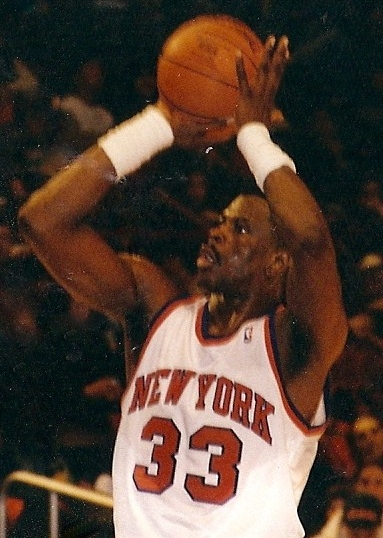
Patrick Ewing, the 1st pick

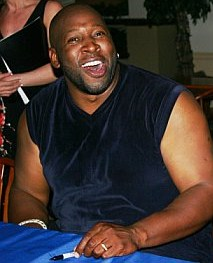
Wayman Tisdale, the 2nd pick

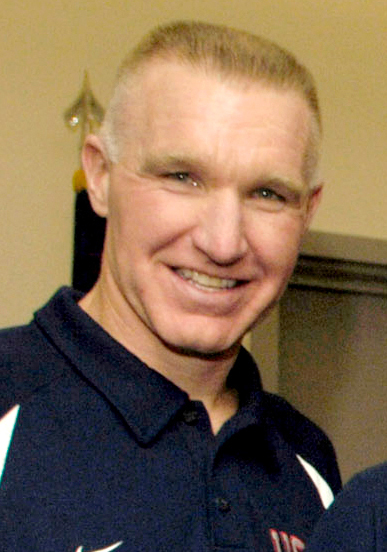
Chris Mullin, the 7th pick

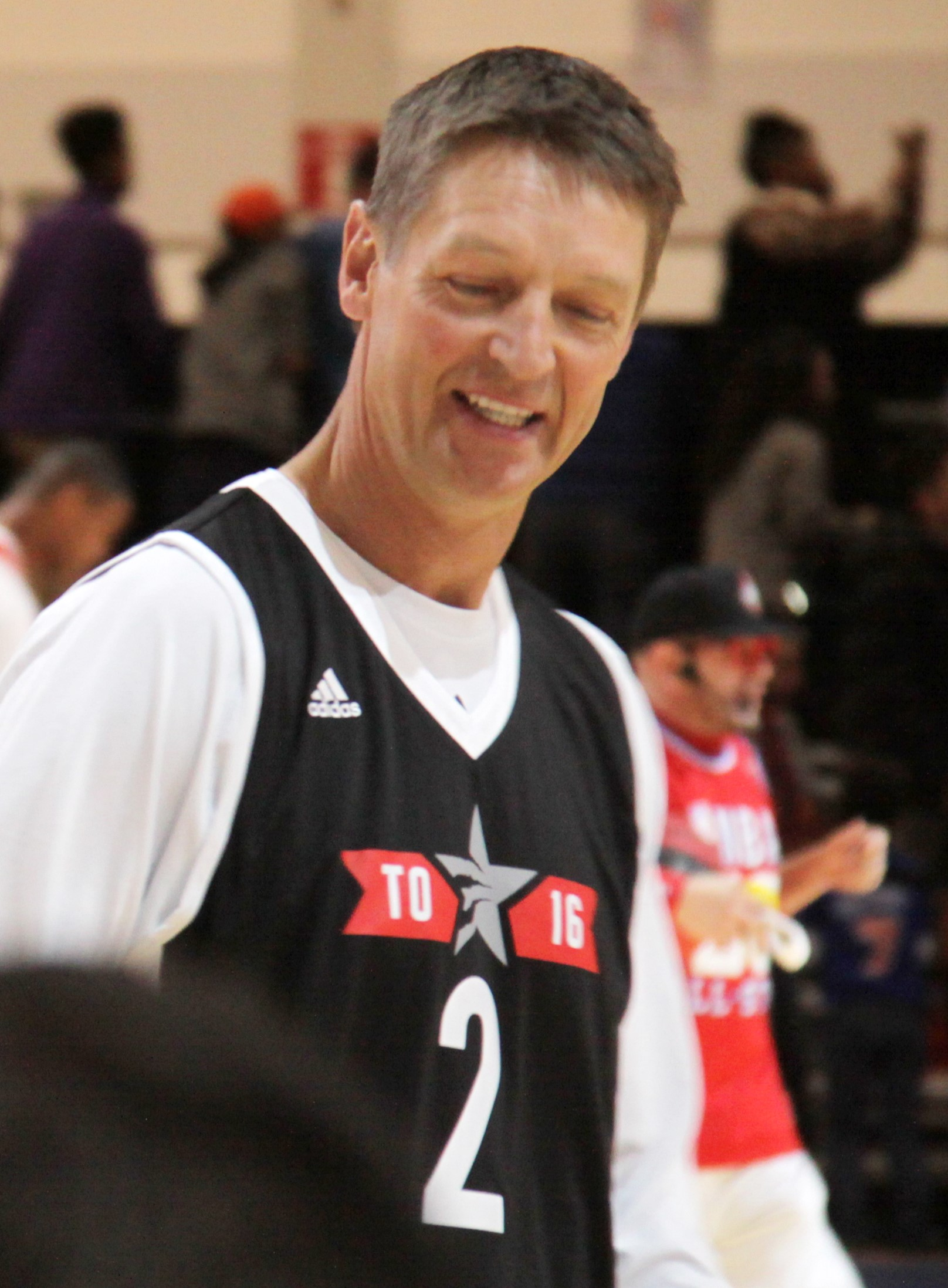
Detlef Schrempf, the 8th pick

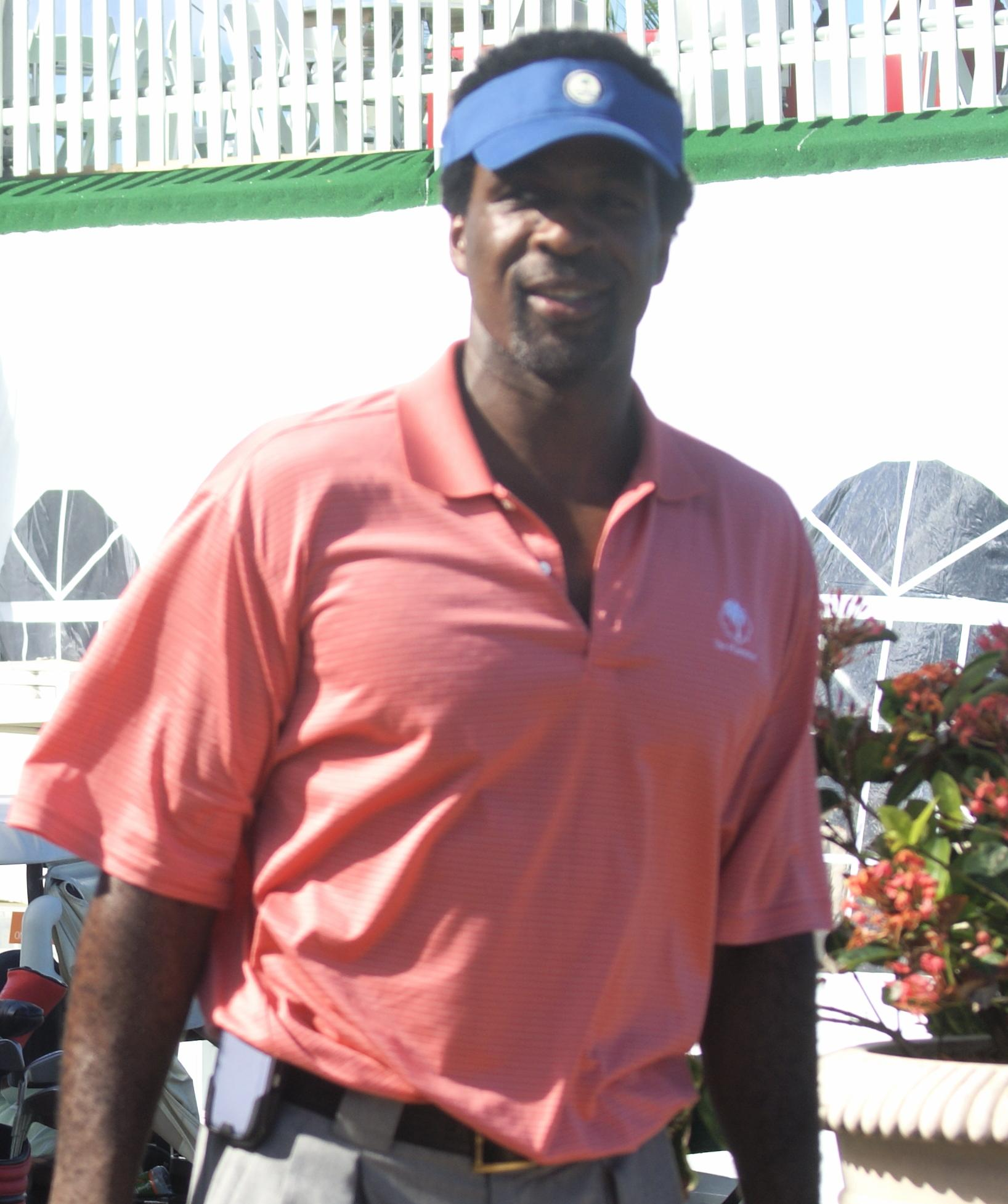
Charles Oakley, the 9th pick

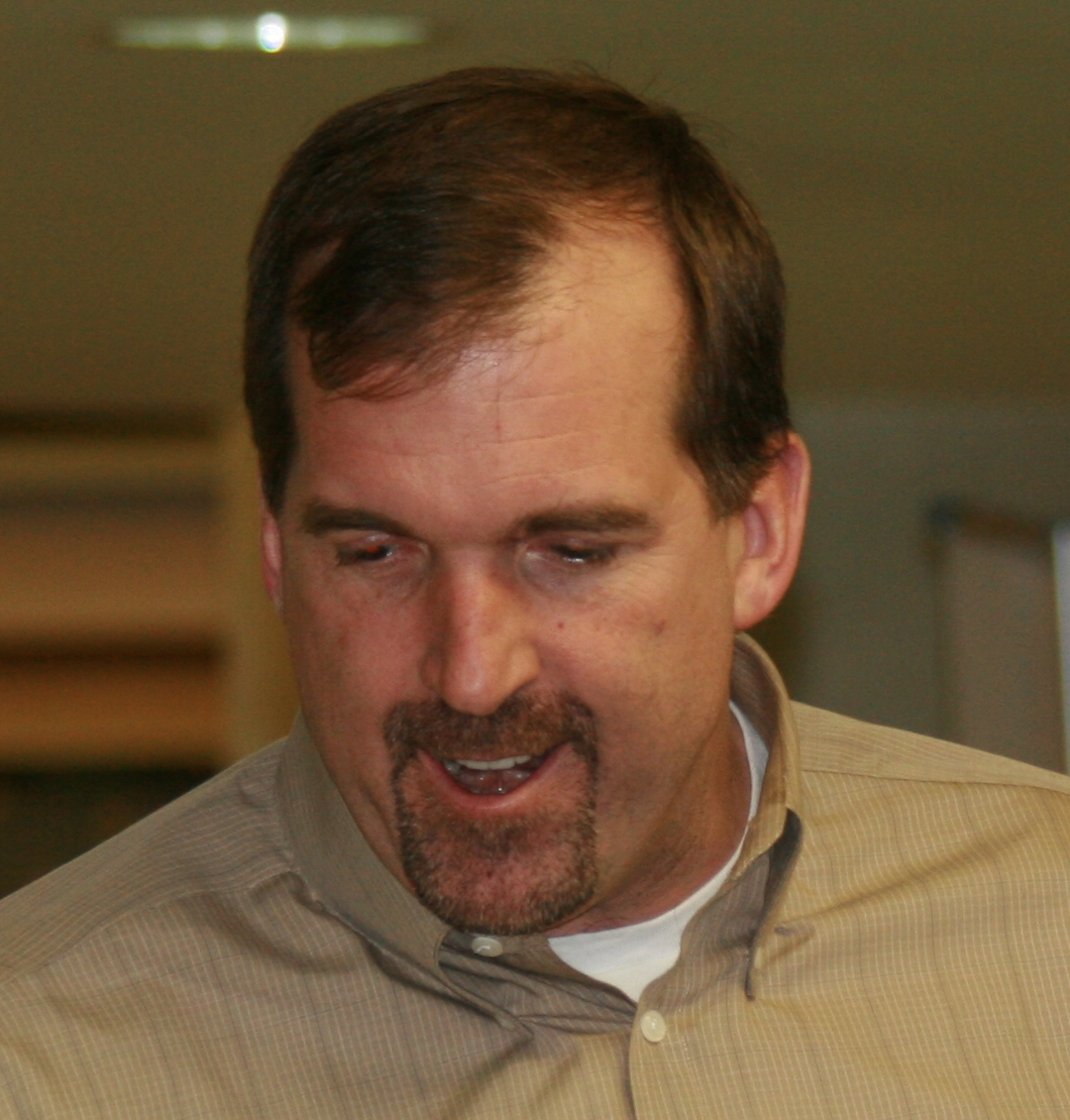
Bill Wennington, the 16th pick

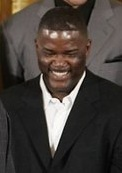
Joe Dumars, the 18th pick

A. C. Green, the 23rd pick

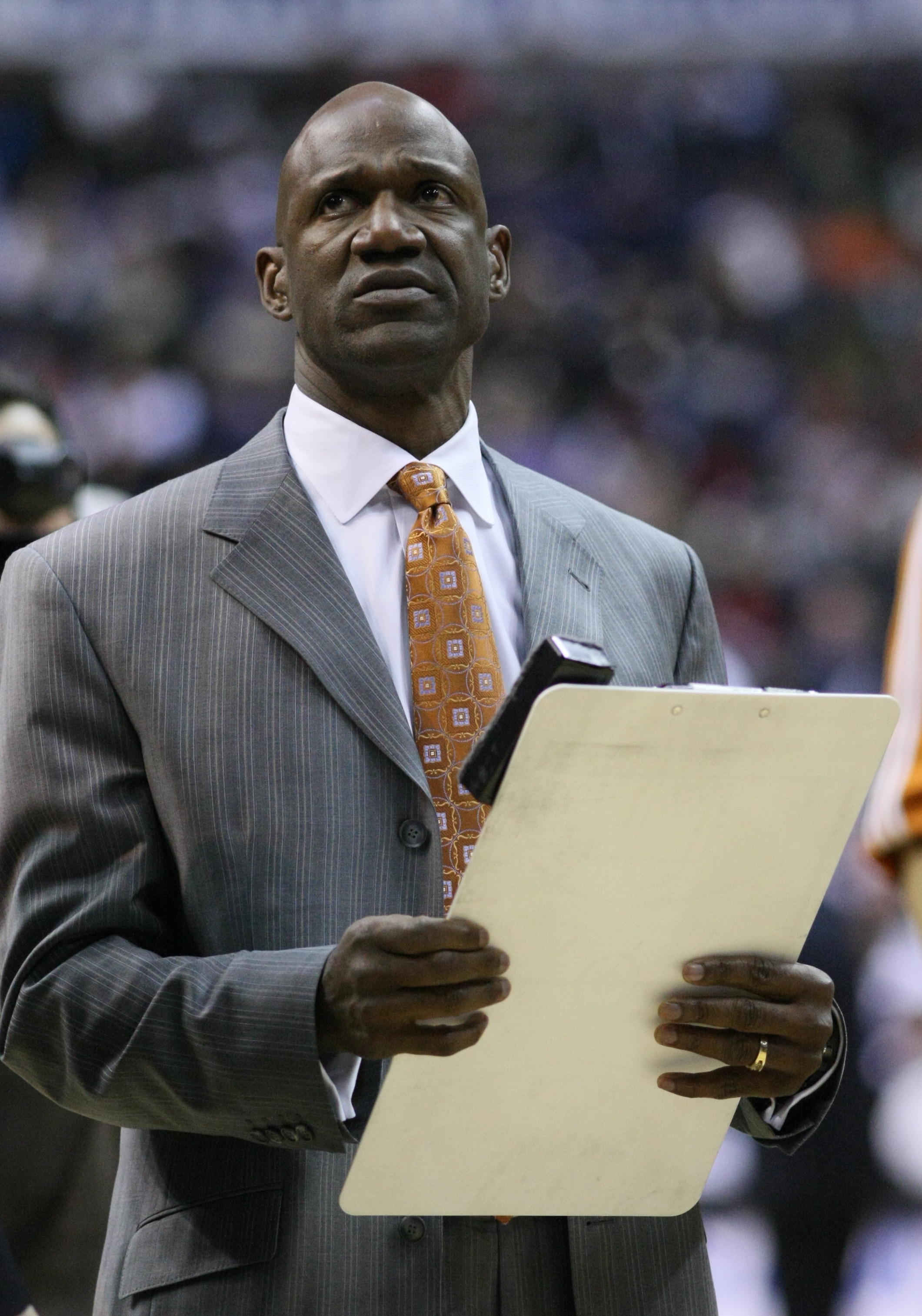
Terry Porter, the 24th pick

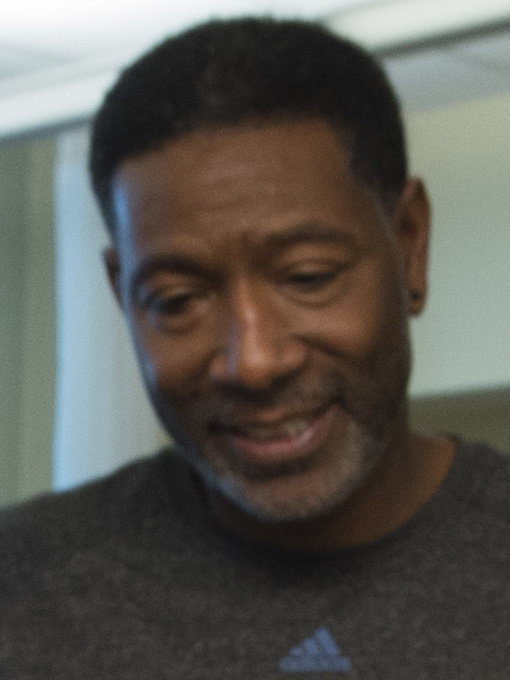
Sam Mitchell, the 54th pick

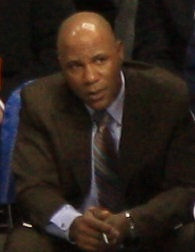
Mario Elie, the 160th pick

Round	Pick	Player	Pos.	Nationality (Note: Nationality indicates the player's national team or representative nationality. If a player has not competed at the international level, then the nationality indicates the national team which the player is eligible to represent according to FIBA rules.)	Team	School/club team
1	1	Patrick Ewing^~	C	United States	New York Knicks	Georgetown (Sr.)
1	2	Wayman Tisdale	PF	United States	Indiana Pacers	Oklahoma (Jr.)
1	3	Benoit Benjamin	C	United States	Los Angeles Clippers	Creighton (Jr.)
1	4	Xavier McDaniel^{+}	PF	United States	Seattle SuperSonics	Wichita State (Sr.)
1	5	Jon Koncak	C	United States	Atlanta Hawks	SMU (Sr.)
1	6	Joe Kleine	C	United States	Sacramento Kings	Arkansas (Sr.)
1	7	Chris Mullin^	SF	United States	Golden State Warriors	St. John's (Sr.)
1	8	Detlef Schrempf*	SF/PF	West Germany	Dallas Mavericks (from Cleveland)	Washington (Sr.)
1	9	Charles Oakley^{+}	PF	United States	Cleveland Cavaliers *	Virginia Union (Sr.)
1	10	Ed Pinckney	PF	United States	Phoenix Suns	Villanova (Sr.)
1	11	Keith Lee	C	United States	Chicago Bulls	Memphis State (Sr.)
1	12	Kenny Green	F	United States	Washington Bullets	Wake Forest (Jr.)
1	13	Karl Malone^	PF	United States	Utah Jazz	Louisiana Tech (Jr.)
1	14	Alfredrick Hughes	SG	United States	San Antonio Spurs	Loyola (IL) (Sr.)
1	15	Blair Rasmussen	C	United States	Denver Nuggets (from Portland)	Oregon (Sr.)
1	16	Bill Wennington	C	Canada	Dallas Mavericks (from New Jersey)	St. John's (Sr.)
1	17	Uwe Blab	C	West Germany	Dallas Mavericks	Indiana (Sr.)
1	18	Joe Dumars^	SG	United States	Detroit Pistons	McNeese State (Sr.)
1	19	Steve Harris	SG	United States	Houston Rockets	Tulsa (Sr.)
1	20	Sam Vincent	SG	United States	Boston Celtics (from Denver via Dallas)	Michigan State (Sr.)
1	21	Terry Catledge	PF	United States	Philadelphia 76ers	South Alabama (Sr.)
1	22	Jerry Reynolds	G/F	United States	Milwaukee Bucks	LSU (Jr.)
1	23	A. C. Green^{+}	SF/PF	United States	Los Angeles Lakers	Oregon State (Sr.)
1	24	Terry Porter^{+}	PG	United States	Portland Trail Blazers (from Boston via Dallas)	Wisconsin–Stevens Point (Sr.)
2	25	Mike Smrek	C	Canada	Portland Trail Blazers	Canisius (Sr.)
2	26	Bill Martin	F	United States	Indiana Pacers	Georgetown (Sr.)
2	27	Dwayne McClain	SG	United States	Indiana Pacers	Villanova (Sr.)
2	28	Ken Johnson	F	United States	Chicago Bulls	Michigan State (Sr.)
2	29	Mike Brittain	C	United States	San Antonio Spurs	South Carolina (Sr.)
2	30	Calvin Duncan^{#}	G	United States	Cleveland Cavaliers	VCU (Sr.)
2	31	Manute Bol	C	Sudan	Washington Bullets	Bridgeport (Fr.)
2	32	Nick Vanos	C	United States	Phoenix Suns	Santa Clara (Sr.)
2	33	Greg Stokes	F/C	United States	Philadelphia 76ers	Iowa (Sr.)
2	34	Aubrey Sherrod^{#}	SG	United States	Chicago Bulls	Wichita State (Sr.)
2	35	Tyrone Corbin	SF/PF	United States	San Antonio Spurs	DePaul (Sr.)
2	36	Yvon Joseph	C	Haiti	New Jersey Nets	Georgia Tech (Sr.)
2	37	Carey Scurry	F	United States	Utah Jazz	LIU Brooklyn (Sr.)
2	38	Fernando Martín	PF	Spain	New Jersey Nets	Real Madrid (Spain)
2	39	George Montgomery^{#}	F	United States	Portland Trail Blazers	Illinois (Sr.)
2	40	Mark Acres	F/C	United States	Dallas Mavericks	Oral Roberts (Sr.)
2	41	Lorenzo Charles	PF	United States	Atlanta Hawks	NC State (Sr.)
2	42	Bobby Lee Hurt^{#}	C/F	United States	Golden State Warriors	Alabama (Sr.)
2	43	Barry Stevens	G/F	United States	Denver Nuggets	Iowa State (Sr.)
2	44	Voise Winters	SG	United States	Philadelphia 76ers	Bradley (Sr.)
2	45	John "Hot Rod" Williams	PF	United States	Cleveland Cavaliers	Tulane (Sr.)
2	46	Adrian Branch	SF	United States	Chicago Bulls (from L.A. Lakers)	Maryland (Sr.)
2	47	Gerald Wilkins	SG	United States	New York Knicks (from Boston)	Chattanooga (Sr.)
3	48	Kenny Patterson^{#}	G	United States	Indiana Pacers	DePaul (Sr.)
3	49	Brad Wright	PF	United States	Golden State Warriors	UCLA (Sr.)
3	50	Leonard Allen^{#}	C	United States	Dallas Mavericks	San Diego State (Sr.)
3	51	Charlie Bradley^{#}	G	United States	Sacramento Kings	South Florida (Sr.)
3	52	Anicet Lavodrama^{#}	C	Central African Republic	Los Angeles Clippers	Houston Baptist (Sr.)
3	53	Rolando Lamb^{#}	G	United States	Seattle SuperSonics	VCU (Sr.)
3	54	Sam Mitchell	SF/PF	United States	Houston Rockets (from San Antonio via Atlanta)****	Mercer (Sr.)
3	55	Herb Johnson^{#}	F	United States	Cleveland Cavaliers	Tulsa (Sr.)
3	56	Jerry Everett^{#}	C	United States	Phoenix Suns	Lamar (Sr.)
3	57	Michael Payne^{#}	F	United States	Houston Rockets	Iowa (Sr.)
3	58	Vernon Moore^{#}	G	United States	Washington Bullets	Creighton (Sr.)
3	59	Sedric Toney	PG	United States	Atlanta Hawks**	Dayton (Sr.)
3	60	Andre Goode^{#}	F	United States	Detroit Pistons	Northwestern (Sr.)
3	61	Perry Young	SG	United States	Portland Trail Blazers	Virginia Tech (Sr.)
3	62	Nigel Miguel^{#}	G	Belize; United States	New Jersey Nets	UCLA (Sr.)
3	63	Harold Keeling	SG	United States	Dallas Mavericks	Santa Clara (Sr.)
3	64	Richie Johnson^{#}	F	United States	Detroit Pistons	Evansville (Sr.)
3	65	Kenny Perry^{#}	C	United States	Washington Bullets	Southern Illinois (Sr.)
3	66	Michael Adams^{+}	PG	United States	Sacramento Kings (from Denver)	Boston College (Sr.)
3	67	Steve Black^{#}	G	United States	Philadelphia 76ers	La Salle (Sr.)
3	68	Eugene McDowell^{#}	C	United States	Milwaukee Bucks	Florida (Sr.)
3	69	Mike Brown	C	United States	Chicago Bulls***	George Washington (Sr.)
3	70	Andre Battle^{#}	G	United States	Boston Celtics	Loyola Chicago (Sr.)
4	71	Luster Goodwin^{#}	G	United States	Golden State Warriors	UTEP (Sr.)
4	72	Vince Hamilton^{#}	G	United States	Indiana Pacers	Clemson (Sr.)
4	73	Fred Cofield	PG	United States	New York Knicks	Eastern Michigan (Sr.)
4	74	Jim Deines^{#}	F	United States	Los Angeles Clippers	Arizona State (Sr.)
4	75	Alex Stivrins	F	United States	Seattle SuperSonics	Colorado (Sr.)
4	76	Willie Simmons^{#}	C	United States	Sacramento Kings	Louisiana Tech (Sr.)
4	77	Arvydas Sabonis^	C	Soviet Union	Atlanta Hawks (pick voided because Sabonis was not yet 21 at the time of the draft)	Žalgiris Kaunas (Soviet Union)
4	78	Granger Hall^{#}	F	United States	Phoenix Suns	Temple (Sr.)
4	79	Mark Davis	SF	United States	Cleveland Cavaliers	Old Dominion (Sr.)
4	80	Craig Beard^{#}	G	United States	Chicago Bulls	Samford (Sr.)
4	81	Richie Adams^{#}	F	United States	Washington Bullets	UNLV (Sr.)
4	82	Scott Roth	SF	United States	San Antonio Spurs	Wisconsin (Sr.)
4	83	Delaney Rudd	G	United States	Utah Jazz	Wake Forest (Sr.)
4	84	John Battle	SG	United States	Atlanta Hawks (from New Jersey)	Rutgers (Sr.)
4	85	Joe Atkinson^{#}	F	United States	Portland Trail Blazers	Oklahoma State (Jr.)
4	86	Bubba Jennings^{#}	G	United States	Dallas Mavericks	Texas Tech (Sr.)
4	87	Spud Webb	PG	United States	Detroit Pistons	NC State (Sr.)
4	88	Michael Brooks^{#}	G	United States	Houston Rockets	Tennessee (Sr.)
4	89	Pete Williams	PF	United States	Denver Nuggets	Arizona (Sr.)
4	90	Derrick Gervin	PF	United States	Philadelphia 76ers	UTSA (Jr.)
4	91	Cozell McQueen	PF	United States	Milwaukee Bucks	NC State (Sr.)
4	92	Dexter Shouse	PG	United States	Los Angeles Lakers	South Alabama (Sr.)
4	93	Cliff Webber^{#}	F	United States	Boston Celtics	Liberty (Sr.)
5	94	Kelvin Johnson^{#}	G	United States	Indiana Pacers	Richmond (Sr.)
5	95	Greg Cavener^{#}	C	United States	Golden State Warriors	Missouri (Sr.)
5	96	Mike Schlegel^{#}	F	United States	New York Knicks	VCU (Sr.)
5	97	Lou Stefanovic^{#}	F	Yugoslavia	Seattle SuperSonics	Illinois State (Sr.)
5	98	Bob Lojewski^{#}	F	United States	Sacramento Kings	Saint Joseph's (Sr.)
5	99	Wayne Carlander^{#}	F	United States	Los Angeles Clippers	USC (Sr.)
5	100	Larry Hampton^{#}	F	United States	Atlanta Hawks	Fairleigh Dickinson (Sr.)
5	101	Gunther Behnke^{#}	C	Germany	Cleveland Cavaliers	Leverkusen (Germany)
5	102	Shawn Campbell^{#}	C	United States	Phoenix Suns	Weber State (Sr.)
5	103	Reid Gettys^{#}	F	United States	Chicago Bulls	Houston (Sr.)
5	104	Dean Shaffer^{#}	G	United States	Washington Bullets	Florida State (Sr.)
5	105	Ray Hall^{#}	G	United States	Utah Jazz	Canisius (Sr.)
5	106	Clayton Olivier^{#}	C	United States	San Antonio Spurs	USC (Sr.)
5	107	James Anderson^{#}	F	United States	Portland Trail Blazers	USC Upstate (Sr.)
5	108	Kelly Blaine^{#}	C	United States	New Jersey Nets	South Alabama (Sr.)
5	109	Tommy Davis^{#}	G	United States	Dallas Mavericks	Minnesota (Sr.)
5	110	Mike Lahm^{#}	C	United States	Detroit Pistons	Murray State (Sr.)
5	111	Ivan Daniels^{#}	C	United States	Indiana Pacers	UIC (Sr.)
5	112	Kenny Brown^{#}	G	United States	Denver Nuggets	Texas A&M (Jr.)
5	113	Carl Wright^{#}	G	United States	Philadelphia 76ers	SMU (Jr.)
5	114	Ray Knight^{#}	C	United States	Milwaukee Bucks	Providence (Sr.)
5	115	Timo Saarelainen^{#}	F	Finland	Los Angeles Lakers	BYU (Sr.)
5	116	Albert Butts^{#}	C	United States	Boston Celtics	La Salle (Sr.)
6	117	Gerald Crosby^{#}	G	United States	Golden State Warriors	Georgia (Sr.)
6	118	Stu Primus^{#}	G	United States	Indiana Pacers	Boston College (Sr.)
6	119	Kent Lockhart^{#}	G	United States	New York Knicks	UTEP (Sr.)
6	120	Charles Balentine^{#}	F	United States	Sacramento Kings	Arkansas (Sr.)
6	121	Malcolm Thomas^{#}	F	United States	Los Angeles Clippers	Missouri (Sr.)
6	122	Earl Walker^{#}	F	United States	Seattle SuperSonics	Mercer (Sr.)
6	123	Tony Duckett^{#}	G	United States	Atlanta Hawks	Lafayette (Sr.)
6	124	Charles Rayne^{#}	G	United States	Phoenix Suns	Temple (Sr.)
6	125	Rickie Johnson^{#}	F	United States	Cleveland Cavaliers	Illinois State (Sr.)
6	126	Danny Meagher^{#}	F	Canada	Chicago Bulls	Duke (Sr.)
6	127	Matt England^{#}	G	United States	Washington Bullets	Houston Baptist (Sr.)
6	128	Chris Harper^{#}	G	United States	San Antonio Spurs	Oregon (Sr.)
6	129	Jim Miller^{#}	F	United States	Utah Jazz	Virginia (Sr.)
6	130	George Almones^{#}	G	United States	New Jersey Nets	Southwestern Louisiana (Jr.)
6	131	Curtis Moore^{#}	G	United States	Portland Trail Blazers	Nebraska (Sr.)
6	132	Carlton Cooper^{#}	F	United States	Dallas Mavericks	Texas (Sr.)
6	133	Vincent Giles^{#}	F	United States	Detroit Pistons	Eastern Michigan (Sr.)
6	134	Sam Potter^{#}	G	United States	Houston Rockets	Oral Roberts (Sr.)
6	135	Joe Carrabino^{#}	F	United States	Denver Nuggets	Harvard (Sr.)
6	136	Daryl Lloyd^{#}	F	United States	Philadelphia 76ers	Drake (Sr.)
6	137	Quentin Anderson^{#}	F	United States	Milwaukee Bucks	Texas Tech (Sr.)
6	138	Tony Neal^{#}	F	United States	Los Angeles Lakers	Cal State Fullerton (Sr.)
6	139	Ralph Lewis	SG	United States	Boston Celtics	La Salle (Sr.)
7	140	Jeff Acres^{#}	F	United States	Indiana Pacers	Oral Roberts (Sr.)
7	141	Eric Boyd^{#}	G	United States	Golden State Warriors	North Carolina A&T (Sr.)
7	142	Ken Bantum^{#}	C	United States	New York Knicks	Cornell (Sr.)
7	143	Gary Maloncon^{#}	F	United States	Los Angeles Clippers	UCLA (Sr.)
7	144	Mike Phelps	SG	United States	Seattle SuperSonics	Alcorn State (Sr.)
7	145	Alton Lee Gipson^{#}	C	United States	Sacramento Kings	Florida State (Sr.)
7	146	Bob Ferry Jr.^{#}	G	United States	Atlanta Hawks	Harvard (Sr.)
7	147	Buzz Peterson^{#}	G	United States	Cleveland Cavaliers	North Carolina (Sr.)
7	148	Georgi Glouchkov	PF	Bulgaria	Phoenix Suns	Akademik Varna (Bulgaria)
7	149	Jeff Adkins^{#}	G	United States	Chicago Bulls	Maryland (Sr.)
7	150	Keith Gray^{#}	G	United States	Washington Bullets	Detroit Mercy (Sr.)
7	151	Mike Wacker^{#}	F	United States	Utah Jazz	Texas (Sr.)
7	152	Al Young^{#}	G	United States	San Antonio Spurs	Virginia Tech (Sr.)
7	153	Mark Owen^{#}	G	United States	Portland Trail Blazers	College of Idaho (Sr.)
7	154	Gary McLain^{#}	G	United States	New Jersey Nets	Villanova (Sr.)
7	155	Ed Catchings^{#}	F	United States	Dallas Mavericks	UNLV (Sr.)
7	156	Frank James^{#}	F	United States	Detroit Pistons	UNLV (Sr.)
7	157	Don Turney^{#}	C	United States	Indiana Pacers	Marshall (Sr.)
7	158	Eddie Smith^{#}	F	United States	Denver Nuggets	Arizona (Sr.)
7	159	Jaye Andrews^{#}	F	United States	Philadelphia 76ers	Bucknell (Sr.)
7	160	Mario Elie	SF/SG	United States	Milwaukee Bucks	American International (Sr.)
7	161	Keith Cieplicki^{#}	G	United States	Los Angeles Lakers	William & Mary (Sr.)
7	162	Chris Remley^{#}	F	United States	Boston Celtics	Rutgers (Sr.)

* Further compensation for draft choices previously traded away by Ted Stepien.
** Compensation for the Utah Jazz signing Billy Paultz
*** Compensation for the Los Angeles Lakers signing Larry Spriggs
**** Compensation for the Atlanta Hawks signing Billy Paultz

== Notable undrafted players ==
These players were not selected in the 1985 draft but played at least one game in the NBA.

Player	Pos.	Nationality	School/club team
David Cooke	PF	United States	Saint Mary's (Sr.)
Dennis Nutt	PG	United States	TCU (Sr.)

== Conspiracy theories about the first pick ==
Some have argued that NBA Commissioner David Stern fixed the first overall pick to help his hometown team, the struggling New York Knicks. The lottery system used in 1985 involved a random drawing of seven envelopes from a hopper, with each of the then-seven non-playoff teams having an equal chance of obtaining the first pick. Inside each of the envelopes was the logo of a non-playoff team. The team whose envelope was drawn first would get the first pick. The process was then repeated until the rest of the first seven lottery picks were determined. In the U.S., CBS had live coverage of Stern pulling the envelopes from the hopper (as opposed to NBA Draft lotteries today where the actual drawing is held behind closed doors before the results are revealed on TV).

The "frozen envelope theory" suggests that the National Basketball Association rigged its 1985 draft lottery so that Patrick Ewing would join the New York Knicks. Theorists claim that a lottery envelope was chilled so that it could be identified by touch. A similar "hot balls theory", promoted by Scottish football manager David Moyes, suggests that certain balls used in draws for UEFA and AFC competitions have been warmed to achieve specific outcomes.

According to another theory, some claim that when an accountant from Ernst & Whinney (the same firm used by Gulf + Western, then-owners of the Knicks) inserted the seven envelopes into the glass drum, some have claimed that he banged the fourth one against the side of the drum to create a creased corner, thereby making it easier for Stern to determine which envelope to choose: the envelope containing the Knicks logo. According to this theory, as the drum was being spun by NBA security director Jack Joyce, Stern was watching the envelopes closely. He then opened the drum, took a deep breath, reached in and selected the envelope with the bent corner and the Knicks logo. This has not been confirmed or corroborated by any official source, as most note that the spinning of the drum was far more forceful than any movement by Joyce, deliberate or otherwise.

== Early entrants ==
=== College underclassmen ===
For the third year in a row and the seventh time in eight years, no college underclassman would withdraw their entry into the NBA draft. This year, however, saw a total of twelve players qualify for entry as college underclassmen, including a Sudanese born freshman center named Manute Bol, who would be considered the tallest player in NBA history at the time. The following college basketball players successfully applied for early draft entrance.

- (United States) George Almones – G, Southwestern Louisiana (junior)
- (United States) Joe Atkinson – F, Oklahoma State (junior)
- (United States) Benoit Benjamin – C, Creighton (junior)
- (Sudan) Manute Bol – C, Bridgeport (freshman)
- (United States) Kenny Brown – G, Texas A&M (junior)
- (United States) Derrick Gervin – F, Texas–San Antonio (junior)
- (United States) Kenny Green – F, Wake Forest (junior)
- (United States) Karl Malone – F, Louisiana Tech (junior)
- (United States) Jerry Reynolds – F, LSU (junior)
- (United States) Reggie Roberts – G, Texas A&M (junior)
- (United States) Wayman Tisdale – F, Oklahoma (junior)
- (United States) Carl Wright – G, SMU (junior)

== Invited attendees ==
The 1985 NBA draft is considered to be the eighth NBA draft to have utilized what's properly considered the "green room" experience for NBA prospects. The NBA's green room is a staging area where anticipated draftees often sit with their families and representatives, waiting for their names to be called on draft night. Often being positioned either in front of or to the side of the podium (in this case, being positioned in the Madison Square Garden's Felt Forum for the first time the NBA draft used a green room there), once a player heard his name, he would walk to the podium to shake hands and take promotional photos with the NBA commissioner. From there, the players often conducted interviews with various media outlets while backstage. However, once the NBA draft started to air nationally on TV starting with the 1980 NBA draft, the green room evolved from players waiting to hear their name called and then shaking hands with these select players who were often called to the hotel to take promotional pictures with the NBA commissioner a day or two after the draft concluded to having players in real-time waiting to hear their names called up and then shaking hands with David Stern, the NBA's commissioner at the time. The NBA compiled its list of green room invites through collective voting by the NBA's team presidents and general managers alike, which in this year's case belonged to only what they believed were the top 13 prospects at the time. However, for the fourth year in a row, one invite in Dwayne McClain would end up staying in the green room beyond the first round of the draft. Even so, the following players were invited to attend this year's draft festivities live and in person.

- (United States) Benoit Benjamin – C, Creighton
- (United States) Joe Dumars – SG, McNeese State
- (Jamaica) / (United States) Patrick Ewing – C, Georgetown
- (United States) Joe Kleine – C, Arkansas
- (United States) Jon Koncak – C, Southern Methodist
- (United States) Keith Lee – C, Memphis State
- (United States) Karl Malone – PF, Louisiana Tech
- (United States) Dwayne McClain – SG, Villanova
- (United States) Xavier McDaniel – PF, Wichita State
- (United States) Chris Mullin – SF, St. John's
- (West Germany) Detlef Schrempf – SF/PF, Washington
- (United States) Wayman Tisdale – PF, Oklahoma
- (Canada) Bill Wennington – C St. John's

== See also ==
- NBA draft conspiracy
- List of first overall NBA draft picks
