= New Jersey Minority Educational Development =

New Jersey Minority Educational Development (also known as NJ MED) is an American non-governmental organization NGO that provides technical support to local, national, and international educational organizations through market research and innovative programming design services from early childhood to post-secondary education.

== History ==
NJ MED founded in 1995 to address the academic and social problems of minority male residents of Camden, New Jersey. In September 1996, NJ MED partnered with the Rutgers-Camden University's EOF (Equal Opportunity Fund) program, Cooperative Business Assistance Corporation (CBAC), and Camden City School District to implement a program to link colleges, businesses, law enforcement, and family support service with the city's two largest public high schools – Camden High and Woodrow Wilson.

The program, titled the 100% Graduation Rate Program, targeted in-coming high school minority males who are determined to be "at-risk" based on standardized testing scores in reading and mathematics. Participants in the program were chosen by each school's guidance department. Each student participant had to complete the program's four year's model which focused on reducing and reversing academic problems as well as addressing six areas of social development (1) Aggression/Violence; (2) Gang Activity; (3) Delinquency; (4) Alcohol, and other Drug Use; (5) Sexual Activity/Exploitation; and (6) Family Functioning.

From 2000 to 2006, the NJ MED's program increased youth employment, graduation, and college enrollment rates above the city, state, and national averages and reduced school suspensions, juvenile arrests, and teen fatherhood.

The organization left the city after funding and operating the program for ten years, when the school district refused to take ownership to fund and operate the program. . In 2010 NJ MED joined several national organizations including, Opportunity Index and America's Promise Alliance to expand its support for the U.S. education system. By designing a national campaign to help prepare the future American workforce for the 21st century.

In 2012 NJ MED began advocating for children's human rights throughout the world to ensure that every child has an opportunity to develop in a safe and nurturing environment. This led them to become a Special Consultative Status member of the United Nations Economic and Social Council (ECOSOC) in 2016.

NJ MED published the organization's first annual ranking of the world's top 20 Universities in 2015. The ranking system consists of the university's graduation rates, student employment rates, and the university's social impact in their communities.

== Structure ==
NJ MED is run by a volunteer staff coordinated by the organization's founder and CEO, Albert N. Mitchell II. All program services are executed by collaborating with initiatives in education, economics, and social development to promote the organization's causes. This includes the launching of two international campaigns in support of the Sustainable Development Goals (SDG), "The World Top 20 Project" and the "To, In, and From Resolution" under the Convention on the rights of the Child

== Causes ==
The World Top 20 Project was launched in 2013 to monitor the education systems of over 210 nations. It aims to ensure that every child has access to education. This project publishes quarterly rankings of the World's Top 20 education systems.

NJ MED's second project is scheduled to launch in 2020. The Project is titled "The To, In, and From Initiative", and is a proposal for a new International Children's Human Rights Law that aims to protect children on their way To school, while they are In school, and as they travel From school.
