= Creative Arts Academy =

Magnet high school in Camden, New Jersey, United States

Location
- 1875 Park Boulevard; Camden, Camden County, New Jersey 08104; United States
- 39.912413°N 75.110319°W

Information
- Type: Magnet public high school
- Established: 1999
- School district: Camden City Public Schools
- NCES School ID: 340264001384
- Principal: Davida Coe-Brockington
- Faculty: 29.5 FTEs
- Grades: 9-12
- Enrollment: 209 (as of 2024–25)
- Student to teacher ratio: 7.1:1
- Website: camdencityschools.org/creative-arts/

Creative Arts High School is a four-year magnet public high school that focuses on fine and performing arts programs in addition to academic programming for students in ninth through twelfth grades in the City of Camden, in Camden County, in the U.S. state of New Jersey, operating as part of the Camden City Public Schools. The school opened in 1999 with a freshman class of under 50 students, as one of three magnet schools in Camden, along with Brimm Medical Arts High School and MetEast High School. Camden residents entering sixth or ninth grades are eligible to apply and must demonstrate interest in a particular field of the arts as well as meet minimum grade and attendance standards. Admission is based on a combination of criteria including auditions, academic scores and interviews.

As of the 2024–25 school year, the school had an enrollment of 209 students and 29.5 classroom teachers (on an FTE basis), for a student–teacher ratio of 7.1:1. There were 98 students (46.9% of enrollment) eligible for free lunch and none eligible for reduced-cost lunch.

== History ==
In 2011, the academy merged with Morgan Village Middle School, adding its programs for grades 6-8; the combined school was called Creative Arts Morgan Village Academy.

Starting in the 2021–22 school year, the high school moved into a new $133 million building on Park Boulevard that it shares with Brimm Medical Arts High School and Camden Big Picture Learning Academy.

== Awards, recognition and rankings ==
Creative and Performing Arts High School was selected by U.S. News & World Report as a Bronze Medal school winner in its ranking of "Best High Schools 2008".

The school was the 180th-ranked public high school in New Jersey out of 328 schools statewide in New Jersey Monthly magazine's September 2012 cover story on the state's "Top Public High Schools", after being ranked 117th in 2010 out of 322 schools listed. The magazine ranked the school 196th in 2008 out of 316 schools. The school was ranked 187th in the magazine's September 2006 issue, which surveyed 316 schools across the state.

== Extracurricular activities ==
Creative Arts does not offer its own athletic programs, but students are still able to participate in athletics as part of the teams of Camden High School and Eastside High School.

The Jazz Band has been recognized at the Berklee College of Music Jazz Festival, and has won first place in 2010.

== Screening process ==
Each year around May, about 100 students are chosen out of the applicants to audition for the school. Out of those 100, around 40 students are chosen. These students are chosen based on their elementary school academic record, a test taken during the audition process, and their overall audition in the fields of Instrumental and Vocal music, Dramatics, Creative Writing, Visual Arts, Dance, and Costume Design.

== Administration ==
The school's principal is Davida L. Coe-Brockington.

== Notable alumni ==
- Khris Davis (born 1987), actor
