= Brimm Medical Arts High School =

Magnet high school in Mercer County, New Jersey, US

Dr. Charles E. Brimm Medical Arts High School

Location
- 1875 Park Boulevard; Camden, Camden County, New Jersey 08103; United States; 39.924571°N 75.094991°W

Information
- Type: Public high school
- Established: 1994
- School district: Camden City School District
- NCES School ID: 340264000087
- Principal: Catherine Chukwueke
- Faculty: 23.5 FTEs
- Grades: 9-12
- Enrollment: 179 (as of 2024–25)
- Student to teacher ratio: 7.6:1
- Website: camdencityschools.org/brimm/

Dr. Charles E. Brimm Medical Arts High School (Brimm Medical Arts) is a four-year magnet public high school with a "break the mold" vision focused directly on medicine, dentistry, nursing, allied health professions and other ancillary health care areas. This school serves students in ninth through twelfth grades from Camden in Camden County, in the U.S. state of New Jersey, as part of the Camden City School District. The school opened in 1994 with a freshman class of 60 students. It was the first magnet school in that city.

As of the 2024–25 school year, the school had an enrollment of 179 students and 23.5 classroom teachers (on an FTE basis), for a student–teacher ratio of 7.6:1. There were 102 students (57.0% of enrollment) eligible for free lunch and none eligible for reduced-cost lunch.

== History ==
The school opened on the campus of Our Lady of Lourdes Medical Center in September 1994 as Medical Arts High School, with an initial class of 60 students.

With the opening in September 1996 of a standalone school building constructed at a cost of $3.1 million (equivalent to $6,400,000 in 2025) and designed to accommodate an enrollment of 300 students, the school became known as Dr. Charles E. Brimm Medical Arts High School.

The school had been accredited by the Middle States Association of Colleges and Schools Commissions on Elementary and Secondary Schools until 2013, when the school's accreditation status was removed.

Starting in the 2021–22 school year, the high school moved into a new $133 million building on Park Boulevard that it shares with Camden Big Picture Learning Academy and Creative Arts Academy.

== Academic performance ==
In 1998, many of the students in the 12th grade class had obtained scholarships for post-secondary education, and all of the students in the 12th grade class had plans for tertiary education.

The school was the 243rd-ranked public high school in New Jersey out of 339 schools statewide in New Jersey Monthly magazine's September 2014 cover story on the state's "Top Public High Schools", using a new ranking methodology. The school had been ranked 208th in the state of 328 schools in 2012, after being ranked 157th out of 322 schools listed in 2010. The magazine ranked the school 71st in 2008 out of 316 schools. The school was ranked 105th in the magazine's September 2006 issue, which included 316 schools across the state.

== Athletics ==
Brimm does not offer its own athletic programs. Students who wish to participate in athletics may play for the teams of Camden High School and Eastside High School.

== Administration ==
The school's principal is Catherine Chukwueke.

== Notable alumni ==
- Sean Chandler (born 1996), American football safety for the New York Giants of the NFL
