= Chris Washburn =

American basketball player (born 1965)

Personal information
- Born: May 13, 1965 (age 61) Hickory, North Carolina, U.S.
- Listed height: 6 ft 11 in (2.11 m)
- Listed weight: 225 lb (102 kg)

Career information
- High school: Hickory (Hickory, North Carolina); Fork Union Military Academy (Fork Union, Virginia); Laurinburg Institute (Laurinburg, North Carolina)
- College: NC State (1984–1986)
- NBA draft: 1986: 1st round, 3rd overall pick
- Drafted by: Golden State Warriors
- Playing career: 1986–1994
- Position: Center
- Number: 8, 50

Career history
- 1986–1987: Golden State Warriors
- 1987–1988: Atlanta Hawks
- 1990–1991: Tulsa Fast Breakers
- 1992: Miami Tropics
- 1993: Westchester Stallions
- 1994: Miami Tropics

Career highlights
- Second-team All-ACC (1986); McDonald's All-American (1984); First-team Parade All-American (1984); Second-team Parade All-American (1983); Third-team Parade All-American (1982)
- Stats at NBA.com
- Stats at Basketball Reference

Christopher Scott Washburn (born May 13, 1965) is an American former professional basketball player.

== College career ==
A 6'11" center, Washburn was one of the top three high school recruits in the country in 1984, along with John Williams (LSU) and Danny Manning (Kansas). He signed with North Carolina State University, along with future NBA players Vinny Del Negro and Nate McMillan to form one of the best recruiting classes in the nation on a team that also included Spud Webb. A gifted athlete, Washburn combined size with speed for a big man and soft hands.

During his time at NC State, he was caught stealing a stereo, which resulted in his being sentenced to 46 hours in jail, a five-year suspended prison term and five years of probation. During his trial, the Wake County district attorney introduced as evidence Washburn's SAT scores, which were below 500 (out of 1600, with 400 being the starting score). "The coaches over there told me, ‘You already signed, you’re already in school, you just have to take the test just to get into college,’ ” Washburn said later. When they told me it didn’t matter what score I was getting, I went in for about 22 minutes. I just marked down [answers] … mark, mark, mark."

His work ethic was also called into question. Recruiting analyst Bob Gibbons claimed that Washburn was "never as good as his reputation," even as a high-school All-American. Gibbons was blasted by many NC State fans for suggesting that Washburn was going to break the Wolfpack basketball program, in response to coach Jim Valvano's claim that Washburn would make the program.

In the full season Washburn played with the Wolfpack, he averaged 17.6 points a game and 6.7 rebounds, sharing time in the front court with future NBA players Charles Shackleford and Chucky Brown. Washburn's best outing was against future top NBA draft pick Brad Daugherty and UNC on February 23, 1986. Before a nationally televised audience, Washburn scored 26 points as the Wolfpack upset the then-ranked #1 Tar Heels 76–65.

Washburn's case was one of many detailed by Peter Golenbock in his book Personal Fouls which effectively ended Valvano's career in 1990. While several errors in the book eventually led publishing house Simon & Schuster to drop the book (it was finally published by Pocket Books), no one disputed that Washburn was a poor student. In January 1989, Richard Lauffer, a former chair of the physical-education department at NC State, claimed Washburn's grades had been altered to maintain the player's eligibility. Both the university counsel and two members of the physical education department subsequently said they had reviewed Washburn's file and found no evidence to support Lauffer's allegations.

== NBA career ==
=== Golden State Warriors and Atlanta Hawks (1986–1988) ===
Washburn left N.C. State after the 1985–86 season and was selected by the Golden State Warriors with the third overall pick of the 1986 NBA draft. He was the third consecutive Atlantic Coast Conference player taken in that draft, following North Carolina center Brad Daugherty (Cleveland Cavaliers) and Maryland forward Len Bias (Boston Celtics).

The Warriors brought in center Joe Barry Carroll to help Washburn's development but to no avail. The highlight of Washburn's career might have come in an October exhibition game in his rookie season against the Knicks. In a 23-point loss, he scored 16 points. Tendinitis in his knee led Washburn to taking anti-inflammatory medicine, which led to a kidney infection in January 1987. On January 28, he checked into a Van Nuys, California drug rehabilitation clinic, admitting to having a cocaine problem. After returning to the Warriors in late March, the player remained ineffective.

Washburn played 72 games over two seasons (1.5 seasons with the Warriors and part of another with the Atlanta Hawks), averaging 3.1 points and 2.4 rebounds per game. Washburn received a lifetime NBA ban in June 1989 after failing three drug tests in three years. He is widely considered one of the biggest busts in NBA draft history. In 2005 Sports Illustrated named him the second-biggest NBA draft bust of all time.

In the mid-1990s, Washburn would play in minor basketball leagues, playing for a few years in the Continental Basketball Association and the U.S. Basketball League. He also played overseas in Argentina, Puerto Rico, Greece, Spain, Switzerland and Colombia.

== Post-playing career ==
Washburn moved to Houston after his basketball career, where he was destitute and says he lived in abandoned buildings and crack houses and ate out of garbage containers. He eventually kicked his drug habit and reached out to others trying to overcome drug addictions.

Washburn later resided to Hickory, North Carolina. He and his girlfriend, Monique Richardson, started a fried chicken business, Washburn's Wings and More, in his hometown of Hickory in 2011, but the business was closed in 2013. In May 2014, Washburn was arrested for obtaining property under false pretense when a passenger in his SUV allegedly failed to pay for gasoline. The charges were later dropped.

Washburn's third son, Julian Washburn, played for the University of Texas El Paso (UTEP) in college, later becoming a professional basketball player. Washburn's younger son Chris Washburn Jr. also played basketball for UTEP before transferring to Texas Christian University (TCU) in 2013.

== Career statistics ==
Legend
| GP | Games played | GS | Games started | MPG | Minutes per game |
| FG% | Field goal percentage | 3P% | 3-point field goal percentage | FT% | Free throw percentage |
| RPG | Rebounds per game | APG | Assists per game | SPG | Steals per game |
| BPG | Blocks per game | PPG | Points per game | **Bold** | Career high |

=== NBA ===
==== Regular season ====
| Year | Team | GP | GS | MPG | FG% | 3P% | FT% | RPG | APG | SPG | BPG | PPG |
|---|---|---|---|---|---|---|---|---|---|---|---|---|
| 1986–87 | Golden State | **35** | **2** | **11.0** | .393 | .000 | .353 | **2.9** | **.5** | **.2** | .2 | 3.8 |
| 1987–88 | Golden State | 8 | 0 | 10.8 | .438 | – | **.625** | 2.5 | .4 | .1 | .0 | **4.1** |
| 1987–88 | Atlanta | 29 | 0 | 6.0 | **.449** | – | .565 | 1.9 | .1 | .1 | **.3** | 2.0 |
| Career | | 72 | 2 | 9.0 | .412 | .000 | .439 | 2.4 | .3 | .2 | .2 | 3.1 |

==== Playoffs ====
| Year | Team | GP | GS | MPG | FG% | 3P% | FT% | RPG | APG | SPG | BPG | PPG |
|---|---|---|---|---|---|---|---|---|---|---|---|---|
| 1987 | Golden State | **5** | 0 | **5.8** | **.429** | – | **.833** | **.2** | **.4** | .0 | .0 | **2.2** |
| 1988 | Atlanta | 1 | 0 | 2.0 | – | – | – | .0 | .0 | .0 | .0 | .0 |
| Career | | 6 | 0 | 5.2 | .429 | – | .833 | .2 | .3 | .0 | .0 | 1.8 |

== See also ==
- List of people banned or suspended by the NBA
