= Baskerville Holmes =

American basketball player (1964–1997)

Personal information
- Born: May 5, 1964 Memphis, Tennessee, U.S.
- Died: March 18, 1997 (aged 32) Memphis, Tennessee, U.S.
- Listed height: 6 ft 6 in (1.98 m)
- Listed weight: 190 lb (86 kg)

Career information
- College: Memphis (1982–1986)
- NBA draft: 1986: 3rd round, 21st overall pick
- Drafted by: Milwaukee Bucks
- Position: Forward
- Stats at Basketball Reference

Baskerville Holmes (May 5, 1964 – March 18, 1997) was an American professional basketball player from Memphis, Tennessee, who was selected in the 1986 NBA draft with the 68th (3rd round) pick by the Milwaukee Bucks. His unique name was given to him by his mother, who was inspired by Sherlock Holmes and Sir Arthur Conan Doyle's crime novel The Hound of the Baskervilles. He was a Tennessee state high school champion in the high jump.

== Career ==
A 6-foot-7-inch (2.01 m) power forward, Holmes played for four seasons at Memphis State University from 1982 to 1986 wearing #43. While with the Tigers, Holmes (along with William Bedford and Keith Lee) formed a very powerful and productive front court. In 1986, Holmes was drafted into the National Basketball Association by the Milwaukee Bucks but never played for them. He played professional basketball in Finland, Spain and Sweden, before returning to Memphis where he became a truck driver.

== Death ==
In March 1997, Holmes, who was believed to have suffered from drug addiction and depression, had an argument with his girlfriend of six years and shot her dead. Sometime after (on the same day) Holmes then killed himself. Before he died, he called his girlfriend's brother and told him that he had accidentally killed her.
