= 1984 McDonald's All-American Boys Game =

American high school basketball game

West	East
131	106
	1st half	2nd half	Total
West	62	69	131
East	56	50	106
- Date: April 8, 1984
- Venue: Pauley Pavilion, Los Angeles, CA
- MVP: John Williams
- Referees: 1; 2; 3
- Attendance: 10,214

McDonald's All-American

The 1984 McDonald's All-American Boys Game was an All-star basketball game played on Sunday, April 8, 1984 at the Pauley Pavilion in Los Angeles, California. The game's rosters featured the best and most highly recruited high school boys graduating in 1984. The game was the 7th annual version of the McDonald's All-American Game first played in 1978.

== 1984 game ==
10,214 people attended the game, which was played at the Pauley Pavilion, home of the UCLA Bruins. The East team had many heavily recruited guards and forwards, and top-ranked center Chris Washburn. The West team had the two best forwards of the class, Danny Manning and John Williams. At halftime, the West led 62–56. Derrick Chievous scored 16 points and had 9 rebounds, and was the top scorer of the East team, while John Williams dominated the game with 27 points and 16 rebounds, and was awarded the MVP trophy. Other good performances were Troy Lewis (18 points), Gary Grant (16) and Delray Brooks (16) for the West; and Duane Ferrell (13 points), Ed Davender (13) and Shelton Jones (15) for the East. Of the 24 players, 10 went on to play at least one game in the NBA.

=== East roster ===
No.	Name	Height	Weight	Position	Hometown	High school	College of Choice
–	Michael Brown	6-4	175	G	Baltimore, MD, U.S.	Paul Laurence Dunbar	Syracuse
–	Derrick Chievous	6-6	183	F	Flushing, NY, U.S.	Holy Cross	Missouri
–	Ed Davender	6-2	160	G	Brooklyn, NY, U.S.	Boys and Girls	Kentucky
–	Duane Ferrell	6-6	198	F	Towson, MD, U.S.	Calvert Hall	Georgia Tech
–	Shelton Jones	6-7	175	F / G	Amityville, NY, U.S.	Amityville Memorial	St. John's
–	Derrick Lewis	6-7	195	F	Washington, D.C., U.S.	Archbishop Carroll	Maryland
–	Richard Madison	6-8	212	F	Memphis, TN, U.S.	Northside	Kentucky
–	David Rivers	6-1	160	G	Jersey City, NJ, U.S.	St. Anthony	Notre Dame
–	Charles Smith	6-9	192	C	Bridgeport, CT, U.S.	Warren Harding	Pitt
–	John Thompson	6-7	210	C / F	Lawrenceville, VA, U.S.	Brunswick	NC State
–	Kevin Walls	6-2	175	G	Camden, NJ, U.S.	Camden	Louisville
–	Chris Washburn	6-11	235	C	Laurinburg, NC, U.S.	Laurinburg Institute	NC State

=== West roster ===
No.	Name	Height	Weight	Position	Hometown	High school	College of Choice
–	Matt Beeuwsaert	6-6	210	F	Santa Ana, CA, U.S.	Mater Dei	Notre Dame
–	Delray Brooks	6-4	180	G	Michigan City, IN, U.S.	Rogers	Indiana
–	Gary Grant	6-2	165	G	Canton, OH, U.S.	McKinley	Michigan
–	Craig Jackson	6-8	195	F	Denver, CO, U.S.	Montbello	UCLA
–	Andrew Lang	6-9	220	C	Pine Bluff, AR, U.S.	Dollarway	Arkansas
–	Troy Lewis	6-4	178	G	Anderson, IN, U.S.	Anderson	Purdue
–	Al Lorenzen	6-7	215	F	Cedar Rapids, IA, U.S.	John F. Kennedy	Iowa
–	Danny Manning	6-10	188	F	Lawrence, KS, U.S.	Lawrence	Kansas
–	Roger McClendon	6-4	175	G	Champaign, IL, U.S.	Centennial	Cincinnati
–	Craig McMillan	6-6	180	G	Cloverdale, CA, U.S.	Cloverdale	Arizona
–	Chris Sandle	6-8	215	F	Long Beach, CA, U.S.	Poly	Arizona State
–	John Williams	6-8	225	C / F	Los Angeles, CA, U.S.	Crenshaw	LSU

=== Coaches ===
The East team was coached by:

- Head Coach Bob Wade of Paul Laurence Dunbar High School (Baltimore, Maryland)

The West team was coached by:

- Head Coach Bill Bobier of Valley High School (Las Vegas, Nevada)
