= Lance Manga =

US international rugby union player

- Born: July 20, 1956 (age 70) Philadelphia, United States
- School: Woodrow Wilson High School

Rugby union career
- Position: Prop
Senior career
Years	Team	Apps	(Points)
1983–84	Pontypridd	3	
International career
Years	Team	Apps	(Points)
1986–92	United States	8	(0)

Lance Manga (born July 20, 1956) is an American former international rugby union player.

Born in Philadelphia, Manga attended Woodrow Wilson High School (since renamed as Eastside High School) in Camden, New Jersey, before getting his start in rugby in 1977 with the South Jersey club. He had a season in Wales with Pontypridd in 1983/84.

Manga, a prop, competed on the U.S. national team from 1986 to 1992, gaining eight caps. He was a member of the side at the 1991 Rugby World Cup, where he played against the All Blacks and faced host nation England at Twickenham.

== See also ==
- List of United States national rugby union players
