= Andy Hinson =

American-football player (1930–2025)

Biographical details
- Born: September 6, 1930
- Died: October 24, 2025 (aged 95); Philadelphia, Pennsylvania, U.S.
- Education: Bethune–Cookman (1953)

Playing career
- 1949–1952: Bethune–Cookman

Coaching career (HC unless noted)
- 1956–1971: Hastings HS (FL)
- 1972–1975: Camden HS (NJ)
- 1976–1978: Bethune–Cookman
- 1979–1984: Cheyney

Head coaching record
- Overall: 46–47–2 (college football); 154–31–5 (high school football)
- Tournaments: 0–1 (NCAA D-II playoffs)

Accomplishments and honors

Championships
- 1 SIAC Division I (1976); 1 PSAC Eastern Division (1979)

Awards
- Little College All–American (1952)

Andrew Walter Hinson (September 6, 1930 – October 24, 2025) was an American football coach and player. He was a collegiate head coach for the Bethune–Cookman Wildcats from 1976 to 1978 and the Cheyney Wolves from 1979 to 1984.

Hinson grew up in Camden, New Jersey, and graduated from Camden High School in 1949 and coached football there for three seasons, earning recognition in 1973 as scholastic football coach of the year.

A graduate of Bethune–Cookman University, Hinson was named to the Little All–American team in 1952.

Hinson died in Philadelphia on October 24, 2025, at the age of 95.

== Head coaching record ==
=== College ===
Year	Team	Overall	Conference	Standing	Bowl/playoffs
Bethune–Cookman Wildcats (Southern Intercollegiate Athletic Conference) (1976–1978)
1976	Bethune–Cookman	8–3	4–1	1st (Division I)	
1977	Bethune–Cookman	8–4	4–1	2nd (Division I)	L NCAA Division II First Round
1978	Bethune–Cookman	7–3–1	3–2		
Bethune–Cookman:		23–10–1	12–4		
Cheyney Wolves (Pennsylvania State Athletic Conference) (1979–1984)
1979	Cheyney	9–2	4–1	1st (Eastern)	
1980	Cheyney	4–5–1	1–4	T–4th (Eastern)	
1981	Cheyney	2–8	1–4	5th (Eastern)	
1982	Cheyney	2–8	1–5	7th (Eastern)	
1983	Cheyney	3–7	1–5	7th (Eastern)	
1984	Cheyney	3–7	1–5	6th (Eastern)	
Cheyney:		23–37–1	9–24		
Total:		46–47–2			
National championship Conference title Conference division title or championship game berth
