= Tommy Roberts (sports broadcaster) =

American sports broadcaster (1928–2024)

Tommy Roberts (June 29, 1928 – August 14, 2024) was an American radio and television broadcaster. In 1984 he launched simulcast – a televised feed of horse races to racetracks, casinos, and off-track betting facilities, enabling gamblers to watch and bet on live racing worldwide.

== Early life ==
Tommy Roberts was born on June 29, 1928, in Camden, New Jersey, the son of Thomas M. Recchiuti (Americanized to Roberts), and his wife Ann. He attended Woodrow Wilson High School and Rutgers College, South Jersey. After one semester he left college and was hired at WCAM in Camden as a copywriter. Four months later he made his debut as a disc jockey.

== Career ==
=== Disc jockey ===
In February 1950 Roberts and WCAM co-announcer Charles Henri introduced a Philadelphia area program called "Club 18".

In November 1950, he promoted the song Tennessee Waltz by Patti Page on his radio show. Roberts showed good judgment as “Tennessee Waltz” sold ten million copies worldwide.

=== Korean War ===
Roberts was drafted for the Korean War on January 15, 1951. He was assigned to a mobile radio station truck located in South Korea. There he produced “On Stage Korea,” a show featuring stars of stage and screen such as singer Eddie Fisher and actors Mickey Rooney and William Holden. Roberts also formed the "Korean Armed Forces Radio Network", with long-range signals reaching Japan, the Philippines, and Guam.

=== Early career in sports broadcasting ===
In 1953 he came back to the US with a commendation for his contributions to the war effort, returning to WCAM. He started a show called Jazz at 11 that showcased the jazz greats of the era. He then formed the “Jazz Workshop.” There, jazz artists from the 1950s performed and invited participation from talented local teenagers.

In 1953 he was offered a political patronage job with the New Jersey State Racing Commission at Garden State Park.

In 1954 Roberts started a radio broadcast from Garden State Park and New Jersey's other racetracks, Monmouth Park and Atlantic City Race Course. From 1956 until 1976 his racing show was broadcast across a three-state radio network of 7 to 14 stations in Pennsylvania, New York and New Jersey.

In 1955 CBS hired Roberts to broadcast the Philadelphia Warriors basketball games. When the Warriors relocated to San Francisco, he became the voice of Philadelphia's new NBA team, the 76ers. He also announced the games of the Philadelphia Big 5 colleges, as well as announcing many of the Philadelphia Eagles football games from 1957 thru 1965.

In 1959 he was hired by NBC to host a nationwide series of TV telecasts from Monmouth Park Racetrack.

In 1960 he began hosting the Race of the Week from Hialeah Park Race Track in Florida, the first live weekly horse racing program to be televised in color. The show was on the air for 23 years.

=== Later career in sports broadcasting ===
In 1960 Roberts became publicity director of Garden State Park. He reverted the Jersey Stakes, the Memorial Day feature to its original name, the Jersey Derby. The winner of the Kentucky Derby, Venetian Way, and Preakness Stakes winner Bally Ache contested the race. The track set statewide records for attendance and pari-mutuel betting.

In 1965 he joined with two others to launch WPHL-TV, the first UHF station to broadcast in Philadelphia. Roberts's programming was a precursor of today's ESPN. In 1968, he purchased radio station WKDN and changed the call letters to his initials, (W)TMR.

In 1968 Roberts worked with Madison Square Garden, producing and announcing eight World Boxing Championship bouts that year, concluding with the heavyweight title bout between the world champion Joe Frazier and Oscar Bonavena. He also helped line up the television stations for a national TV network of his own and innovated closed-circuit boxing in hotel ballrooms and racetracks.

In 1971 he launched Roberts Television International and introduced broadcast syndication of major sports and entertainment programming. He purchased the rights to telecast Laurel Park's signature race, The Washington D.C. International Stakes. Roberts produced the program and called the race. His company, Independent Television Network, made agreements with 114 stations across the country, along with outlets in seven foreign countries to telecast the event.

In 1973 Roberts was the race caller for Secretariat's Triple Crown of Thoroughbred Racing series on 800 mutual radio network stations across the country. Later, he produced and hosted a series of televised races from Aqueduct Race Track.

In 1976 Roberts was appointed vice president and general manager of Hialeah Park. In his three years at the track he introduced an advance-deposit wagering system allowing betting to be conducted over the telephone.

== Simulcasting in horse racing ==
In 1983 Roberts created the first horse racing simulcast, after buying the rights to feed live races via satellite from 30 racetracks to all Nevada casinos. He was granted an unconditional gaming license by the Nevada Gaming Commission and began operating there in March 1984. Casino patrons were able to wager from all over the country while watching the live races. Simulcast now operates worldwide.

His son Todd Roberts continues the racing simulcast business through Racetrack Television Network and Roberts Communications Network, the latter of which also provides wagering data services to racetracks and bookmakers.

== Death ==
Roberts died on August 14, 2024, at the age of 96.

== Awards ==
Roberts was referred to as "The Voice of Horse Racing" by the Broadcast Pioneers of Philadelphia, and in 2012 they inducted him into their "Hall of Fame".
