= 1986 NBA draft =

Basketball player selection

1986 NBA Draft

General information
- Sport: Basketball
- Date: June 17, 1986
- Location: Felt Forum, Madison Square Garden (New York City, New York)
- Network: TBS Superstation

Overview
- 162 total selections in 7 rounds
- League: NBA
- First selection: Brad Daugherty (Cleveland Cavaliers)
- Hall of Famers: 3: C Arvydas Sabonis; PF Dennis Rodman; SG Dražen Petrović

The 1986 NBA draft was held on June 17, 1986.

== Overview and aftermath ==
This draft holds the record for the most players chosen who later debuted in the NBA, with 66.

=== Drug and health issues involving drafted players ===
Various drug-related problems plagued players in the 1986 NBA draft. Most notable was the death of the #2 overall pick, Len Bias. The highly touted forward died from an overdose of cocaine less than two days after being selected by the defending champion Boston Celtics. Other problems involving drugs hampered the careers of centers Chris Washburn, Roy Tarpley, and William Bedford.

=== Successful second-round players ===
While a number of first-round selections were unable to make an impact in the league, the 1986 draft featured a number of talented second-round selections who made an impact on the league. Dennis Rodman became one of the leading defenders and rebounders in NBA history and was inducted into the Naismith Memorial Basketball Hall of Fame. Mark Price, Kevin Duckworth, and Jeff Hornacek were all multiple NBA All-Stars. Johnny Newman, Nate McMillan, and David Wingate had long, productive careers as role players.

=== International draftees ===
This draft contained two exceptional international players, both of whom had abbreviated NBA careers for unusual reasons. Third-round selection Dražen Petrović was coming off an All-Star caliber fourth season in 1991 when he was killed in an automobile accident. He has since been elected to both the Naismith Hall of Fame and the FIBA Hall of Fame. Arvydas Sabonis, a resident of the Soviet Union and one of the greatest centers in basketball history, was not permitted to play in the United States during his prime because of Cold War antagonisms. He was already a two-time Olympic medal winner – a gold in 1988 with the USSR, and a bronze in 1992 with Lithuania – before finally being allowed to join the NBA in 1995, four years after the dissolution of the Soviet Union in 1991. By that time he had lost much of his mobility to a string of knee and Achilles tendon injuries. Still, he finished second in both the Sixth Man Award and Rookie of the Year voting. After the 1995–96 season, he won a second Olympic bronze medal with Lithuania. He played seven seasons with Portland before returning to Lithuania to finish his career. Sabonis entered the FIBA Hall in 2010 and the Naismith Hall in 2011.

=== Other draftee contributions to the game ===
This draft is also known for the number of players who made important contributions to the sport of basketball beyond playing. For example, Nate McMillan followed a highly successful run on the court with the Seattle SuperSonics by becoming head coach, and then spent seven seasons as head coach of the Portland Trail Blazers. Scott Skiles coached the Milwaukee Bucks, then became the first coach to lead the Chicago Bulls to the playoffs in the post-Michael Jordan era.

Larry Krystkowiak became the head coach of the Bucks, then became head coach at the University of Utah in 2011. John Salley won four championship rings with three different NBA teams (Detroit Pistons, Chicago Bulls and Los Angeles Lakers) before becoming one of the hosts of The Best Damn Sports Show Period on Fox Sports Network. Mark Price served as an assistant coach at Georgia Tech, a shooting consultant with Memphis (one season) and Atlanta (two seasons), a shooting coach for Golden State (one season), and in December 2011 was named Player Development Coach for the Orlando Magic.

Jeff Hornacek would also be a full-time assistant head coach for the Utah Jazz for two seasons before accepting a job as the head coach for the Phoenix Suns in the 2013–14 NBA season. He moved on to became the head coach for the New York Knicks from 2016 to 2018. Pete Myers, selected in the sixth round as the 120th overall pick, was an assistant coach for the Chicago Bulls from 2001 to 2010 and Golden State Warriors starting in 2011. Jim Les, the 70th overall pick, was an assistant coach for the WNBA's Sacramento Monarchs from 1999 to 2001, then was head coach at Bradley University from 2002 to 2011 and UC Davis since 2011.

Jay Bilas, who was selected in the fifth round as the 108th overall pick but never played in the NBA, is an ESPN college basketball analyst.

== Draft selections ==
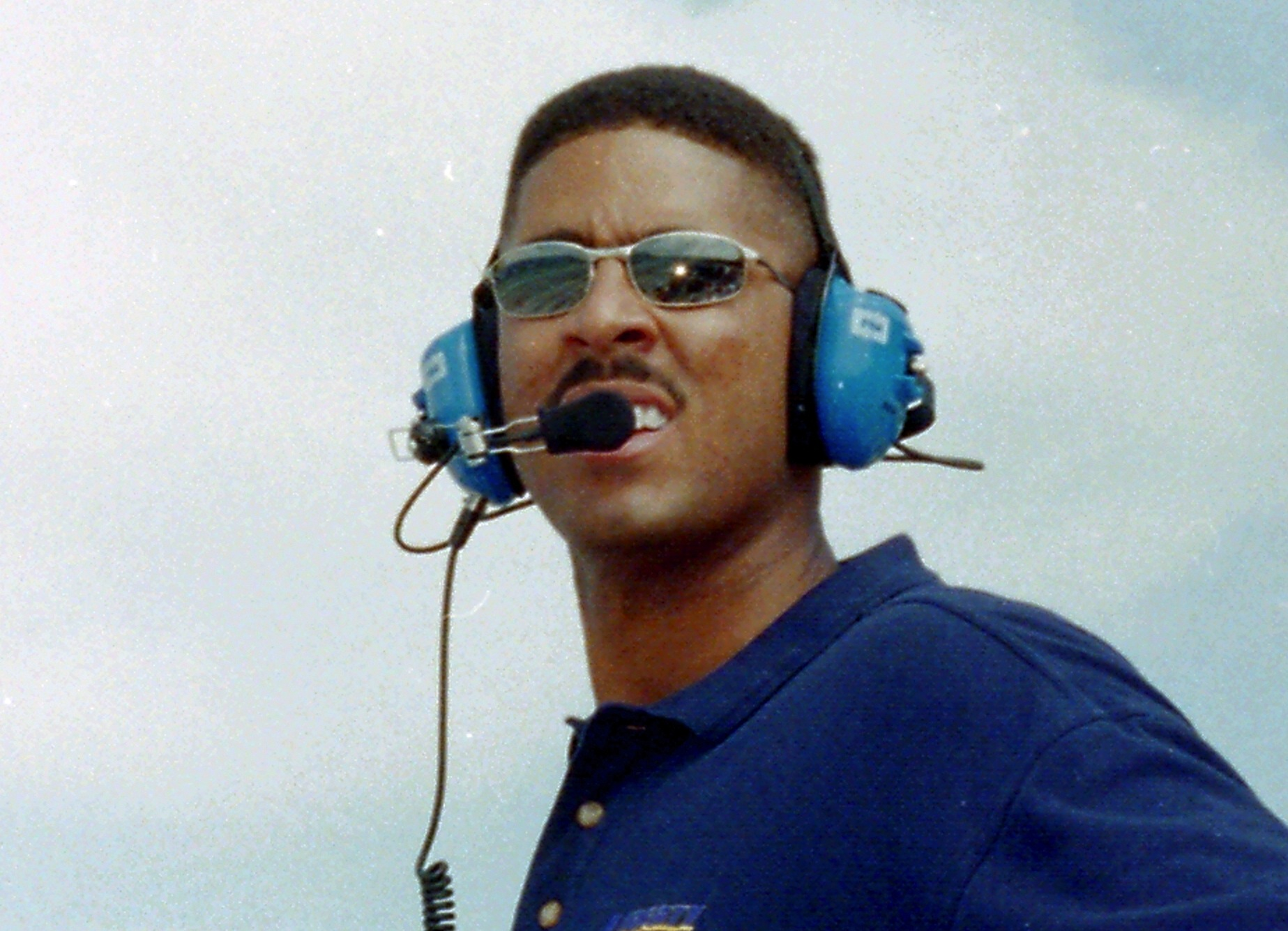
Brad Daugherty was selected 1st overall by the Cleveland Cavaliers.

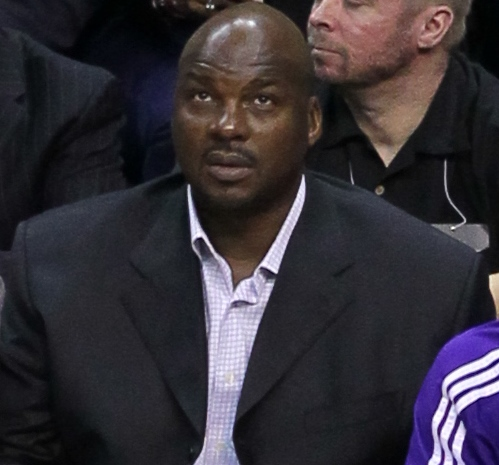
Chuck Person was selected 4th overall by the Indiana Pacers.

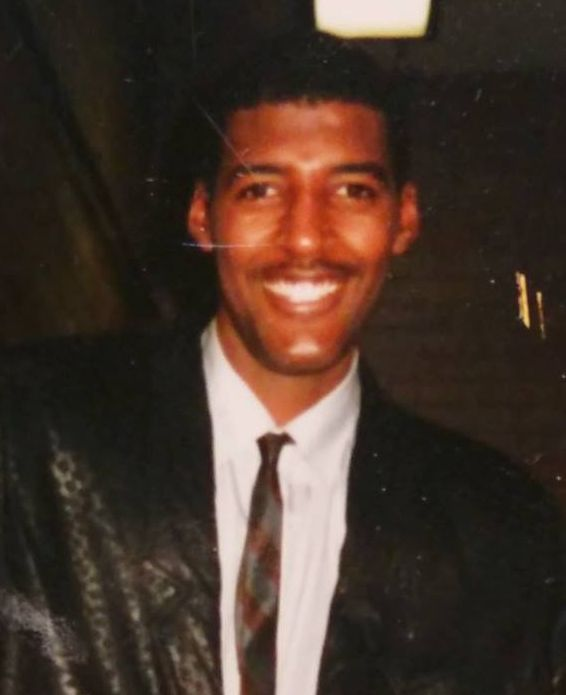
Roy Tarpley was selected 7th overall by the Dallas Mavericks.

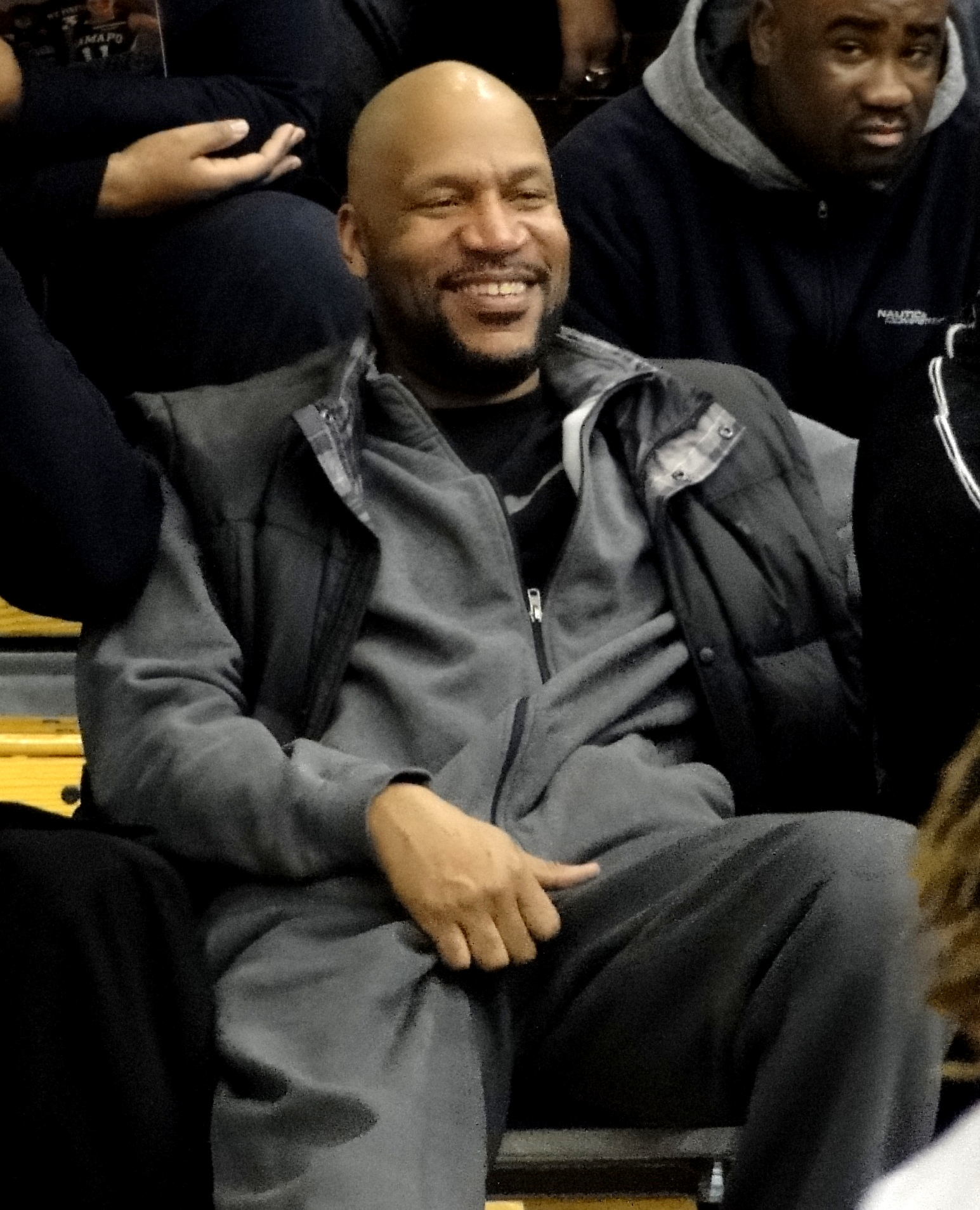
Ron Harper was selected 8th overall by the Cleveland Cavaliers.

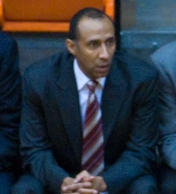
Johnny Dawkins was selected 10th overall by the San Antonio Spurs.

Arvydas Sabonis was selected 24th overall by the Portland Trail Blazers.

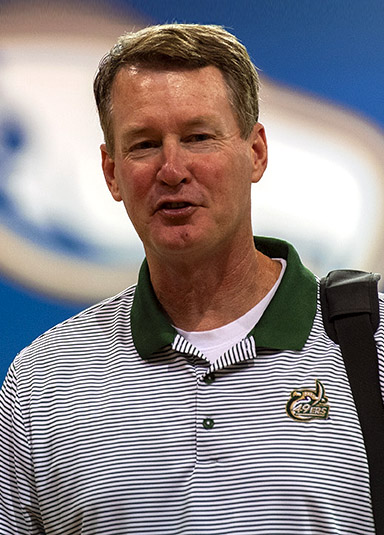
Mark Price was selected 25th overall by the Dallas Mavericks (traded to the Cleveland Cavaliers).

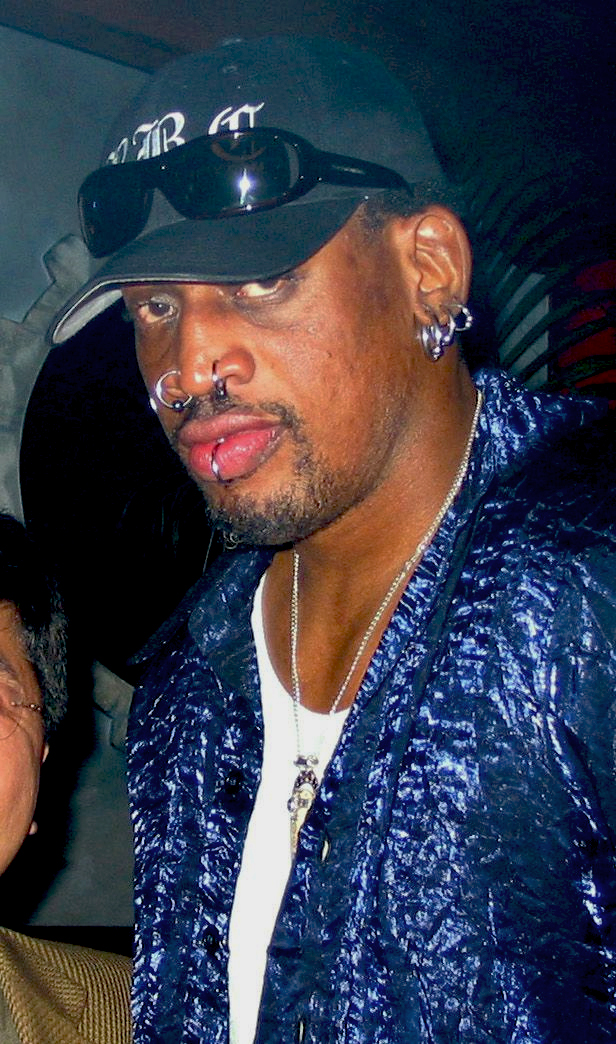
Dennis Rodman was selected 27th overall by the Detroit Pistons.

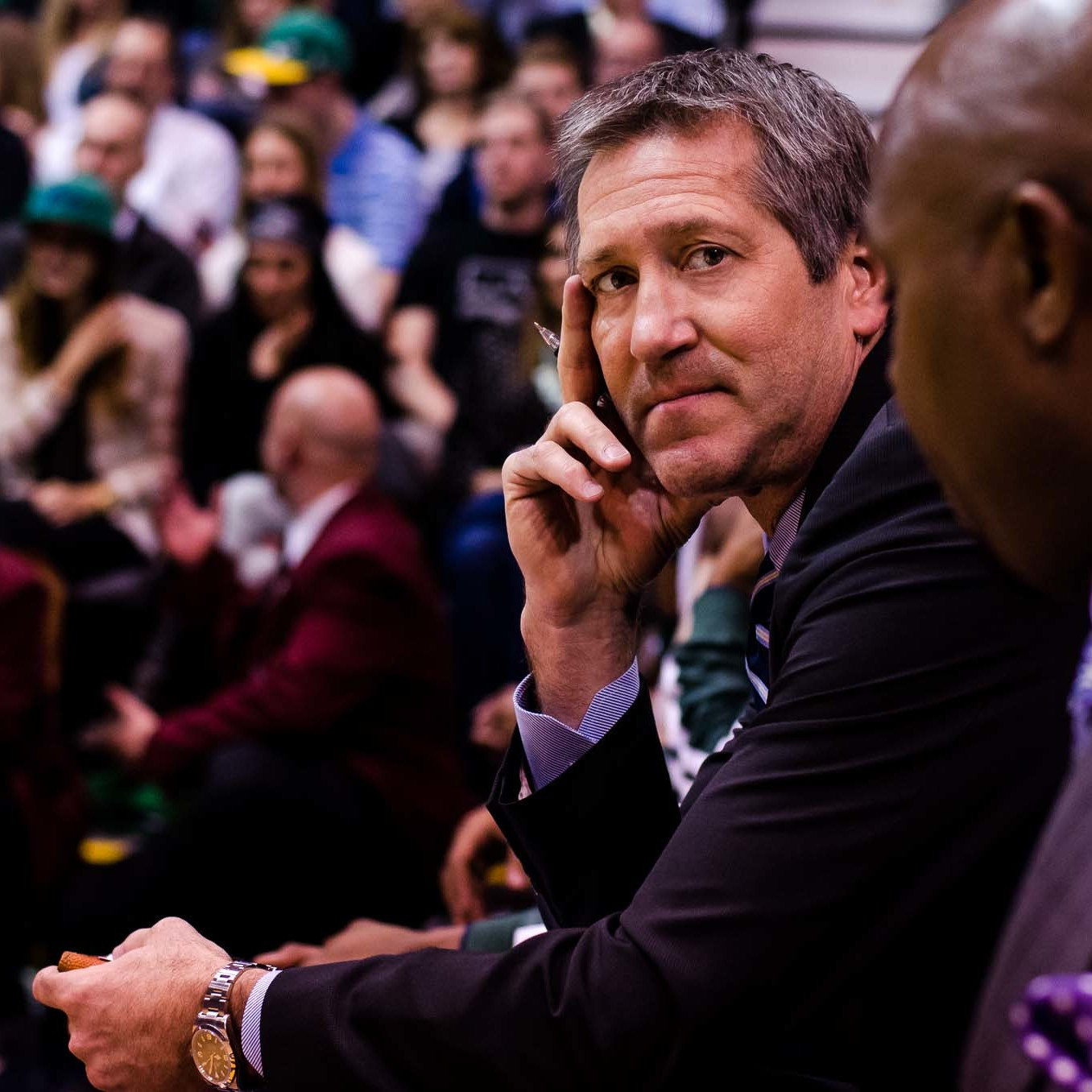
Jeff Hornacek was selected 46th overall by the Phoenix Suns.

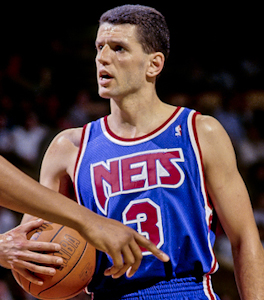
Dražen Petrović was selected 60th overall by the Portland Trail Blazers.

PG	Point guard	SG	Shooting guard	SF	Small forward	PF	Power forward	C	Center

^	Denotes player who has been inducted to the Naismith Memorial Basketball Hall of Fame
*	Denotes player who has been selected for at least one All-Star Game and All-NBA Team
^{+}	Denotes player who has been selected for at least one All-Star Game
^{x}	Denotes player who has been selected for at least one All-NBA Team
^{#}	Denotes player who has never appeared in an NBA regular-season or playoff game
^{~}	Denotes player who has been selected as Rookie of the Year

Round	Pick	Player	Position	Nationality (Note: Nationality indicates the player's national team or representative nationality. If a player has not competed at the international level, then the nationality indicates the national team which the player is eligible to represent according to FIBA rules.)	NBA Team	School/Club team
1	1	Brad Daugherty*	C	United States	Cleveland Cavaliers (from L.A. Clippers via Philadelphia)	North Carolina (Sr.)
1	2	Len Bias^{#}	SF	United States	Boston Celtics (from Seattle)	Maryland (Sr.)
1	3	Chris Washburn	C	United States	Golden State Warriors	NC State (So.)
1	4	Chuck Person~	SF	United States	Indiana Pacers	Auburn (Sr.)
1	5	Kenny Walker	SF	United States	New York Knicks	Kentucky (Sr.)
1	6	William Bedford	C	United States	Phoenix Suns	Memphis State (Jr.)
1	7	Roy Tarpley	C	United States	Dallas Mavericks (from Cleveland)	Michigan (Sr.)
1	8	Ron Harper	SG	United States	Cleveland Cavaliers *	Miami (OH) (Sr.)
1	9	Brad Sellers	C	United States	Chicago Bulls	Ohio State (Sr.)
1	10	Johnny Dawkins	PG	United States	San Antonio Spurs	Duke (Sr.)
1	11	John Salley	PF	United States	Detroit Pistons (from Sacramento)	Georgia Tech (Sr.)
1	12	John Williams	PF	United States	Washington Bullets	LSU (So.)
1	13	Dwayne Washington	PG	United States	New Jersey Nets	Syracuse (Jr.)
1	14	Walter Berry	SF/PF	United States	Portland Trail Blazers	St. John's (Sr.)
1	15	Dell Curry	SG/SF	United States	Utah Jazz	Virginia Tech (Sr.)
1	16	Maurice Martin	SF	United States	Denver Nuggets (from Dallas)	Saint Joseph's (Sr.)
1	17	Harold Pressley	SF	United States	Sacramento Kings (from Detroit)	Villanova (Sr.)
1	18	Mark Alarie	PF	United States	Denver Nuggets	Duke (Sr.)
1	19	Billy Thompson	SF	United States	Atlanta Hawks	Louisville (Sr.)
1	20	Buck Johnson	SF	United States	Houston Rockets	Alabama (Sr.)
1	21	Anthony Jones	SF	United States	Washington Bullets (from Philadelphia)	UNLV (Sr.)
1	22	Scott Skiles	PG	United States	Milwaukee Bucks	Michigan State (Sr.)
1	23	Ken Barlow^{#}	PF	United States	Los Angeles Lakers	Notre Dame (Sr.)
1	24	Arvydas Sabonis^	C	Soviet Union	Portland Trail Blazers (from Boston via L.A. Clippers)	Zalgiris (Soviet Union)
2	25	Mark Price*	PG	United States	Dallas Mavericks (Traded to Cleveland)	Georgia Tech (Sr.)
2	26	Greg Dreiling	C	United States	Indiana Pacers	Kansas (Sr.)
2	27	Dennis Rodman^	PF	United States	Detroit Pistons	Southeastern Oklahoma State (Sr.)
2	28	Larry Krystkowiak	PF	United States	Chicago Bulls	Montana (Sr.)
2	29	Johnny Newman	SF	United States	Cleveland Cavaliers	Richmond (Sr.)
2	30	Nate McMillan	PG	United States	Seattle SuperSonics	NC State (Sr.)
2	31	Joe Ward^{#}	SF	United States	Phoenix Suns	Georgia (Sr.)
2	32	Cedric Henderson	PF	United States	Atlanta Hawks	Simac Milano (Italy)
2	33	Kevin Duckworth^{+}	C	United States	San Antonio Spurs	Eastern Illinois (Sr.)
2	34	Johnny Rogers	PF	Spain	Sacramento Kings	UC Irvine (Sr.)
2	35	Milt Wagner	SG	United States	Dallas Mavericks	Louisville (Sr.)
2	36	Steve Mitchell^{#}	PG	United States	Washington Bullets	UAB (Sr.)
2	37	Panagiotis Fasoulas^{#}	C	Greece	Portland Trail Blazers	NC State (Sr.)
2	38	Lemone Lampley^{#}	C	United States	Seattle SuperSonics	DePaul (Sr.)
2	39	Rafael Addison	SF	United States	Phoenix Suns	Syracuse (Sr.)
2	40	Augusto Binelli^{#}	C	Italy	Atlanta Hawks	Virtus Bologna (Italy)
2	41	Otis Smith	SG	United States	Denver Nuggets	Jacksonville (Sr.)
2	42	Ron Kellogg^{#}	SF	United States	Atlanta Hawks	Kansas (Sr.)
2	43	Dave Feitl	C	United States	Houston Rockets	UTEP (Sr.)
2	44	David Wingate	SG	United States	Philadelphia 76ers	Georgetown (Sr.)
2	45	Keith Smith	PG	United States	Milwaukee Bucks	Loyola Marymount (Sr.)
2	46	Jeff Hornacek^{+}	SG	United States	Phoenix Suns	Iowa State (Sr.)
2	47	Michael Jackson	PG	United States	New York Knicks	Georgetown (Sr.)
3	48	Forrest McKenzie	SF	United States	San Antonio Spurs	Loyola Marymount (Sr.)
3	49	Juden Smith^{#}	F	United States	Portland Trail Blazers	UTEP (Sr.)
3	50	Kevin Henderson	PG	United States	Cleveland Cavaliers	Cal State Fullerton (Sr.)
3	51	Mike Williams	PF/SF	United States	Golden State Warriors	Bradley (Sr.)
3	52	Ricky Wilson	PG	United States	Chicago Bulls	George Mason (Sr.)
3	53	Tod Murphy	PF	United States	Seattle SuperSonics	UC Irvine (Sr.)
3	54	Dwayne Polee	SG	United States	Los Angeles Clippers	Pepperdine (Sr.)
3	55	Kenny Gattison	PF	United States	Phoenix Suns	Old Dominion (Sr.)
3	56	Keith Colbert^{#}	F	United States	Philadelphia 76ers	Virginia Tech (Sr.)
3	57	Bruce Douglas	SG	United States	Sacramento Kings	Illinois (Sr.)
3	58	David Henderson	PG	United States	Washington Bullets	Duke (Sr.)
3	59	Wendell Alexis^{#}	PF	United States	Golden State Warriors	Syracuse (Sr.)
3	60	Dražen Petrović^	SG	Yugoslavia	Portland Trail Blazers	Cibona (Yugoslavia)
3	61	John Shasky	C	United States	Utah Jazz	Minnesota (Sr.)
3	62	Anthony Welch^{#}	F	United States	Dallas Mavericks	Illinois (Sr.)
3	63	Bill Breeding^{#}	C	United States	Utah Jazz	Rocky Mountain (Sr.)
3	64	Don Redden^{#}	G	United States	Denver Nuggets	LSU (Sr.)
3	65	Dave Hoppen	C	United States	Atlanta Hawks	Nebraska (Sr.)
3	66	Anthony Bowie	SG	United States	Houston Rockets	Oklahoma (Sr.)
3	67	Ron Rowan	SG	United States	Philadelphia 76ers	St. John's (Sr.)
3	68	Baskerville Holmes^{#}	F	United States	Milwaukee Bucks	Memphis (Sr.)
3	69	Andre Turner	PG	United States	Los Angeles Lakers	Memphis State (Sr.)
3	70	Jim Les	PG	United States	Atlanta Hawks	Bradley (Sr.)
4	71	Calvin Thompson^{#}	F	United States	New York Knicks	Kansas (Sr.)
4	72	Derrick Taylor^{#}	G	United States	Indiana Pacers	LSU (Sr.)
4	73	Warren Martin^{#}	C	United States	Cleveland Cavaliers	North Carolina (Sr.)
4	74	Scott Meents	PF	United States	Chicago Bulls	Illinois (Sr.)
4	75	Dan Bingenheimer^{#}	F	United States	Golden State Warriors	Missouri (Sr.)
4	76	Michael Graham^{#}	F	United States	Seattle SuperSonics	Georgetown (Sr.)
4	77	Grant Gondrezick	SG	United States	Phoenix Suns	Pepperdine (Sr.)
4	78	John Brownlee^{#}	F	United States	Los Angeles Clippers	Texas (Sr.)
4	79	Carlos Briggs^{#}	G	United States	San Antonio Spurs	Baylor (Sr.)
4	80	Alvin Franklin^{#}	G	United States	Sacramento Kings	Houston (Sr.)
4	81	Steve Hale^{#}	G	United States	New Jersey Nets	North Carolina (Sr.)
4	82	Barry Mungar^{#}	F	Canada	Washington Bullets	St. Bonaventure (Sr.)
4	83	David Shaffer^{#}	F	United States	Portland Trail Blazers	Florida State (Sr.)
4	84	Marty Embry^{#}	F	United States	Utah Jazz	DePaul (Sr.)
4	85	Myron Jackson	PG	United States	Dallas Mavericks	Arkansas–Little Rock (Sr.)
4	86	Chauncey Robinson^{#}	G	United States	Detroit Pistons	Mississippi State (Sr.)
4	87	Anthony Watson^{#}	G	United States	Denver Nuggets	San Diego State (Sr.)
4	88	Efrem Winters^{#}	F	United States	Atlanta Hawks	Illinois (Sr.)
4	89	Conner Henry	SG	United States	Houston Rockets	UC Santa Barbara (Sr.)
4	90	Wes Stallings^{#}	G	United States	Philadelphia 76ers	East Tennessee State (Sr.)
4	91	Bob Beecher^{#}	F	United States	Sacramento Kings	Virginia Tech (Sr.)
4	92	Dale Blaney^{#}	G	United States	Los Angeles Lakers	West Virginia (Sr.)
4	93	Tony Benford^{#}	G	United States	Boston Celtics	Texas Tech (Sr.)
5	94	Jerome Mincey^{#}	F	Puerto Rico	New York Knicks	UAB (Sr.)
5	95	Richard Rellford	SF	United States	Indiana Pacers	Michigan (Sr.)
5	96	Ben Davis^{#}	G	United States	Cleveland Cavaliers	Gardner–Webb (Sr.)
5	97	Clinton Smith	SG	United States	Golden State Warriors	Cleveland State (Sr.)
5	98	Jimmy Gilbert^{#}	C	United States	Chicago Bulls	Texas A&M (Sr.)
5	99	Dominic Pressley	PG	United States	Seattle SuperSonics	Boston College (Sr.)
5	100	Steffond Johnson	PF	United States	Los Angeles Clippers	San Diego State (Sr.)
5	101	Greg Spurling^{#}	C	United States	Phoenix Suns	Carson–Newman (Sr.)
5	102	Earl Kelley^{#}	G	United States	San Antonio Spurs	UConn (Sr.)
5	103	Keith Morrison^{#}	G	United States	Sacramento Kings	Washington State (Sr.)
5	104	Paul Fortier^{#}	F	United States	Washington Bullets	Washington (Sr.)
5	105	Archie Johnson^{#}	F	United States	New Jersey Nets	UAB (Sr.)
5	106	Jerry Adams^{#}	F	United States	Portland Trail Blazers	Oregon (Sr.)
5	107	Kerry Boagni^{#}	F	United States	Utah Jazz	Cal State Fullerton (Sr.)
5	108	Jay Bilas^{#}	C	United States	Dallas Mavericks	Duke (Sr.)
5	109	Clarence Hanley^{#}	C	United States	Detroit Pistons	Old Dominion (Sr.)
5	110	Jon Collins^{#}	F	United States	Denver Nuggets	Eastern Illinois (Sr.)
5	111	Nicky Jones^{#}	G	United States	Atlanta Hawks	VCU (Sr.)
5	112	Andre Banks^{#}	G	United States	Houston Rockets	Iowa (Sr.)
5	113	Kevin Holmes^{#}	F	United States	Philadelphia 76ers	DePaul (Sr.)
5	114	Bobby Deaton^{#}	F	United States	Milwaukee Bucks	Southwestern University (Sr.)
5	115	Roger Harden^{#}	G	United States	Los Angeles Lakers	Kentucky (Sr.)
5	116	Dave Colbert^{#}	C	United States	Boston Celtics	Dayton (Sr.)
6	117	Butch Wade^{#}	F	United States	New York Knicks	Michigan (Sr.)
6	118	Jeff Hall^{#}	G	United States	Indiana Pacers	Louisville (Sr.)
6	119	Gilbert Wilburn^{#}	F	United States	Cleveland Cavaliers	New Mexico State (Sr.)
6	120	Pete Myers	G/SF	United States	Chicago Bulls	Arkansas–Little Rock (Sr.)
6	121	Bobby Lee Hurt^{#}	C	United States	Golden State Warriors	Alabama (Sr.)
6	122	Curtis Kitchen	PF	United States	Seattle SuperSonics	South Florida (Sr.)
6	123	Jim McCaffrey^{#}	G	United States	Phoenix Suns	Holy Cross (Sr.)
6	124	Tim Kempton	PF	United States	Los Angeles Clippers	Notre Dame (Sr.)
6	125	Kevin Lewis^{#}	F	United States	San Antonio Spurs	SMU (Sr.)
6	126	John Flowers^{#}	F	United States	Sacramento Kings	UNLV (Sr.)
6	127	Troy Webster^{#}	G	United States	New Jersey Nets	George Washington (Sr.)
6	128	Lorenzo Duncan^{#}	G	United States	Washington Bullets	Sam Houston (Sr.)
6	129	Tony Hampton^{#}	G	United States	Portland Trail Blazers	Montana State (Sr.)
6	130	Chuck Everson^{#}	C	United States	Utah Jazz	Villanova (Sr.)
6	131	Greg Anderson^{#}	C	United States	Dallas Mavericks	Lamar (Sr.)
6	132	Greg Grant^{#}	F	United States	Detroit Pistons	Utah State (Sr.)
6	133	Anthony Frederick	SF	United States	Denver Nuggets	Pepperdine (Sr.)
6	134	Alexander Volkov	C	Soviet Union	Atlanta Hawks	Budivelnik Kiev (USSR)
6	135	Robert Worthy^{#}	F	United States	Houston Rockets	Dyke (Sr.)
6	136	Andre McCloud^{#}	F	United States	Philadelphia 76ers	Seton Hall (Sr.)
6	137	John Kimbrell^{#}	F	United States	Milwaukee Bucks	Lipscomb (Sr.)
6	138	Walter Downing^{#}	C	United States	Los Angeles Lakers	Marquette (Sr.)
6	139	Greg Wendt^{#}	F	United States	Boston Celtics	Detroit Mercy (Sr.)
7	140	Duane Kendall^{#}	F	United States	New York Knicks	South Carolina (Sr.)
7	141	Steve Woodside^{#}	F	United States	Indiana Pacers	Oregon State (Sr.)
7	142	Ralph Dalton^{#}	C	United States	Cleveland Cavaliers	Georgetown (Sr.)
7	143	Steve Kenilvort^{#}	G	United States	Golden State Warriors	Santa Clara (Sr.)
7	144	Robert Henderson^{#}	C	United States	Chicago Bulls	Michigan (Sr.)
7	145	Glen McCants^{#}	F	United States	Seattle SuperSonics	Clemson (Sr.)
7	146	Johnny Brown^{#}	F	United States	Los Angeles Clippers	New Mexico (Sr.)
7	147	Damon Goodwin^{#}	G	United States	Phoenix Suns	Dayton (Sr.)
7	148	Michael Anderson^{#}	G	United States	San Antonio Spurs	Pan American (Sr.)
7	149	Ron Rankin^{#}	G	United States	Sacramento Kings	Southeast Missouri State (Sr.)
7	150	Joseph Price^{#}	G	United States	Washington Bullets	Notre Dame (Sr.)
7	151	Jim Dolan^{#}	F	United States	New Jersey Nets	Notre Dame (Sr.)
7	152	Randy Schiff^{#}	G	United States	Portland Trail Blazers	Linfield (Sr.)
7	153	Mark Mitchell^{#}	F	United States	Utah Jazz	Hartford (Sr.)
7	154	Kim Cooksey^{#}	G	United States	Dallas Mavericks	Middle Tennessee (Sr.)
7	155	Larry Polec^{#}	F	United States	Detroit Pistons	Michigan State (Sr.)
7	156	Mike Marshall^{#}	G	United States	Denver Nuggets	McNeese State (Sr.)
7	157	Valeri Tikhonenko^{#}	C	Soviet Union	Atlanta Hawks	CSKA Moscow (Soviet Union)
7	158	Rick Olson^{#}	G	United States	Houston Rockets	Wisconsin (Sr.)
7	159	Dan Palombizio^{#}	F	United States	Philadelphia 76ers	Ball State (Sr.)
7	160	Jeff Strong^{#}	G	United States	Milwaukee Bucks	Missouri (Sr.)
7	161	Mark Coleman^{#}	G	United States	Los Angeles Lakers	Mississippi Valley State (Sr.)
7	162	Tom Ivey^{#}	C	United States	Boston Celtics	Boston University (Sr.)

* compensation for draft choices traded away by Ted Stepien

== Notable undrafted players ==
These players who declared or were automatically eligible for the 1986 draft were not selected but played in the NBA.

Player	Position	Nationality	School/Club team
Robert Rose	SG	United States; Australia	George Mason (Sr.)
Andre Spencer	SF	United States	Northern Arizona (Sr.)
Kelvin Upshaw	SG	United States	Utah (Sr.)
Stojko Vranković	C	Yugoslavia	KK Zadar (Croatia)

== Early entrants ==
=== College underclassmen ===
For the fourth year in a row and the eighth time in nine years, no college underclassman would withdraw their entry into the NBA draft. However, it would be the first time in NBA history that a player that qualified for the status of a "college underclassman" would be playing professional basketball overseas, as Cedric Henderson (who had previously played for the University of Georgia for a year before travelling to Italy to play for the Simac Olimpia Milano) would qualify as an official entry there, expanding the list of official players there from eight to nine. Excluding him, however, the following college basketball players successfully applied for early draft entrance.

- (United States) William Bedford – C, Memphis (junior)
- (United States) Walter Berry – F, St. John's (junior)
- (United States) Michael Graham – F, Georgetown (freshman)
- (United States) Jerald Hyatt – G, Lincoln Memorial (junior)
- (United States) Andre Morgan – G, Hawaii (junior)
- (United States) Chris Washburn – F/C, NC State (sophomore)
- (United States) Dwayne Washington – Syracuse (junior)
- (United States) John Williams – F, LSU (sophomore)

=== Other eligible players ===
This year marked the first official year that a player that would not be considered a typical, proper "college underclassman" would qualify for entry in an NBA draft as an underclassman of sorts.

Player	Team	Note	Ref.
(United States) Cedric Henderson	Olimpia Milano (Italy)	Left Georgia in 1985; playing professionally since the 1985–86 season	

== Invited attendees ==
The 1986 NBA draft is considered to be the ninth NBA draft to have utilized what's properly considered the "green room" experience for NBA prospects. The NBA's green room is a staging area where anticipated draftees often sit with their families and representatives, waiting for their names to be called on draft night. Often being positioned either in front of or to the side of the podium (in this case, being positioned in the Madison Square Garden's Felt Forum for the fifth year in a row), once a player heard his name, he would walk to the podium to shake hands and take promotional photos with the NBA commissioner.

From there, the players often conducted interviews with various media outlets while backstage. However, once the NBA draft started to air nationally on TV starting with the 1980 NBA draft, the green room evolved from players waiting to hear their name called and then shaking hands with these select players who were often called to the hotel to take promotional pictures with the NBA commissioner a day or two after the draft concluded to having players in real-time waiting to hear their names called up and then shaking hands with David Stern, the NBA's commissioner at the time. The NBA compiled its list of green room invites through collective voting by the NBA's team presidents and general managers alike, which in this year's case belonged to only what they believed were the top 11 prospects at the time.

However, while the NBA avoided having a play wait in the green room beyond the first round for a fifth straight year in a row, one of the players invited in Len Bias would tragically lose his life two days after this draft concluded due to a drug overdose. Nevertheless, the following players were invited to attend this year's draft festivities live and in person.

- (United States) William Bedford – C, Memphis State
- (United States) Len Bias – SF, Maryland
- (United States) Brad Daugherty – C, North Carolina
- (United States) Johnny Dawkins – PG, Duke
- (United States) Chuck Person – SF, Auburn
- (United States) John Salley – PF, Georgia Tech
- (United States) Roy Tarpley – C, Michigan
- (United States) Kenny Walker – SF, Kentucky
- (United States) Chris Washburn – C, North Carolina State
- (United States) Dwayne Washington – PG, Syracuse
- (United States) John Williams – PF, LSU

== See also ==
- List of first overall NBA draft picks
