= Ed Davender =

American basketball player (1966–2016)

Personal information
- Born: May 26, 1966
- Died: April 28, 2016 (aged 49)
- Listed height: 6 ft 2 in (1.88 m)

Career information
- High school: Hamilton (Brooklyn, New York); Boys and Girls (Brooklyn, New York)
- College: Kentucky (1984–1988)
- NBA draft: 1988: 3rd round, 60th overall pick
- Drafted by: Washington Bullets
- Position: Guard

Career highlights
- Third-team Parade All-American (1984); McDonald's All-American (1984)
- Stats at Basketball Reference

Ed Davender (May 26, 1966 – April 28, 2016) was an American basketball player. He was a noted streetballer, and considered to be among the best New York shooting guards throughout his high school career. Initially Davender played at Alexander Hamilton High School in Brooklyn, where he averaged 29 points per game until the school closed down. He transferred to Boys and Girls High School, where he became a McDonald's All-American and Parade All-American during his senior year. Davender played college basketball for the Kentucky Wildcats. He was selected by the Washington Bullets as the 60th overall pick in the 1988 NBA draft, but never played professionally.

In 2010, Davender was convicted of a basketball ticket scam and was sentenced to eight years in prison. He died on April 28, 2016, as the result of a heart attack suffered days earlier.
