= Cedric Henderson (basketball, born 1965) =

American basketball player (1965–2023)

Personal information
- Born: October 3, 1965 Marietta, Georgia, U.S.
- Died: April 1, 2023 (aged 57)
- Listed height: 6 ft 8 in (2.03 m)
- Listed weight: 210 lb (95 kg)

Career information
- High school: Marietta (Marietta, Georgia)
- College: Georgia (1984–1985)
- NBA draft: 1986: 2nd round, 32nd overall pick
- Drafted by: Atlanta Hawks
- Playing career: 1985–1995
- Position: Power forward
- Number: 24, 31

Career history
- 1985–1986: Simac Olímpia Milano
- 1986: Atlanta Hawks
- 1986: Milwaukee Bucks
- 1986–1987: Albany Patroons
- 1987–1988: Olympique Antibes
- 1988: Quad City Thunder
- 1988: Jacksonville Hooters
- 1988–1989: Quad City Thunder
- 1990–1993: Roanne
- 1993–1995: Quad City Thunder

Career highlights
- CBA champion (1994); Second-team All-SEC (1985)
- Stats at NBA.com
- Stats at Basketball Reference

Cedric Maurice Henderson (October 3, 1965 – April 1, 2023) was an American professional basketball player who briefly played in the National Basketball Association (NBA).

== Career ==
Henderson went to school in Lithia Springs, Georgia, then played basketball in Jefferson City, Tennessee, before transferring to Marietta High School. In 1984, he ranked among the nation's top high school basketball prospects. He verbally committed himself to play college basketball at Louisville, but then went to Carson-Newman College, before it was found out that he had not graduated from high school. He attended an international-studies program in Jamaica and finally graduated from an alternative high school in Atlanta, Georgia.

A 6'8" forward, Henderson then joined the Georgia Bulldogs, making his debut in December 1984. In the 1984–85 season, he led the Bulldogs in scoring (15.5 points per game), rebounding (7.1 per game) and blocks (1.1 per game).

Henderson kicked off his professional career in Italy, playing for Olimpia Milano. He won the Italian championship as well as the Italian cup competition with Milano. He was selected by the Atlanta Hawks in the second round of the 1986 NBA draft.

He split the 1986-87 NBA season with the Hawks and Milwaukee Bucks, averaging 1.4 points and 1.0 rebounds in 8 games. In 1986–87, he played for CBA's Albany Patroons before moving to France, where he inked a deal with Olympique Antibes. In the same season, Henderson saw action 24 games for CBA's Quad City Thunder. In 1988, he was a member of the Jacksonville Hooters in the United States Basketball League.

In 1990, he started a three-year stint with Chorale Roanne Basket of France. After returning to the US, he rejoined the Quad City Thunder. In 1993–94, he was a member of the Thunder squad that won the CBA championship under coach Dan Panaggio.

Henderson died on April 1, 2023, at the age of 57.

== Career statistics ==
Legend
GP	Games played	GS	Games started	MPG	Minutes per game
FG%	Field goal percentage	3P%	3-point field goal percentage	FT%	Free throw percentage
RPG	Rebounds per game	APG	Assists per game	SPG	Steals per game
BPG	Blocks per game	PPG	Points per game	**Bold**	Career high

=== NBA ===
==== Regular season ====
Year	Team	GP	GS	MPG	FG%	3P%	FT%	RPG	APG	SPG	BPG	PPG
1986–87	Atlanta	**6**	0	1.7	.400	–	**1.000**	.5	.0	.0	.0	.8
1986–87	Milwaukee	2	0	**3.0**	**.667**	–	**1.000**	**2.5**	.0	.0	.0	**3.0**
Career		8	0	2.0	.500	–	1.000	1.0	.0	.0	.0	1.4
