= Brad Hawkins (American football) =

American football player and coach (born 1998)

Michigan Wolverines
- Title: Assistant safeties coach

Personal information
- Born: July 26, 1998 (age 28); Camden, New Jersey, U.S.
- Listed height: 6 ft 1 in (1.85 m)
- Listed weight: 221 lb (100 kg)

Career information
- High school: Camden (Camden, New Jersey); Suffield Academy (Suffield, Connecticut)
- College: Michigan
- NFL draft: 2022: undrafted

Career history

Playing
- Atlanta Falcons (2022)*; New England Patriots (2022–2023)*
- * Offseason or practice squad member only

Coaching
- Michigan; Graduate assistant coach – defensive backs (2024–2025); Assistant safeties coach (2026–present)

Awards and highlights
- Third-team All-Big Ten (2021)
- Stats at Pro Football Reference

Brad Hawkins (born July 26, 1998) is an American college football coach and former professional football safety in the National Football League (NFL). He is the current assistant safeties coach at the University of Michigan, first joining the staff as a graduate assistant in 2024. Hawkins played college football for the Michigan Wolverines, earning All-Big Ten honors in 2021.

== High school ==
Hawkins attended MetEast High School before transferring to Camden High School, where he was a multi-sport athlete, playing basketball along with football before graduating in 2016 and going on to do a post-graduate year at Suffield Academy.

== College career ==
Hawkins played for five years for Michigan, appearing in a program-record 56 games, with 31 starts at the free safety position. He was a third-team all-Big Ten selection in 2021.

== Professional career ==
=== Atlanta Falcons ===
After going undrafted in the 2022 NFL draft, Hawkins signed with the Atlanta Falcons as a free agent. He was cut by the Falcons on July 6, 2022.

=== New England Patriots ===
On August 2, 2022, Hawkins signed with the New England Patriots. He was waived during final roster cuts on August 30. Though primarily signed for practice squad use, he played in the Patriots three preseason games. Hawkins was cut from the team on October 3. He signed a reserve/future contract on January 10, 2023. Hawkins was released by the Patriots on August 27.

== Coaching career ==
On March 4, 2024, Hawkins was hired by the University of Michigan as a graduate assistant.
