= Roger McClendon =

American basketball player and business executive

Personal information
- Born: 1966 (age 59–60) Champaign, Illinois
- Listed height: 6 ft 4 in (1.93 m)

Career information
- High school: Centennial (Champaign, Illinois)
- College: Cincinnati (1984–1988)
- Position: Guard
- Number: 21

Career highlights
- 2x All-Metro Conference First Team (1986, 1987); Metro Conference Freshman Team (1985); McDonald's All-American (1984)

Roger McClendon (born 1966) is a former American college basketball player and current business executive. He played collegiately at the University of Cincinnati.

== College career ==
McClendon, a 6'4" guard from Champaign, Illinois, was a highly touted recruit and played in the 1984 McDonald's All-American Boys Game. He would commit to Cincinnati, playing from 1984 to 1988. McClendon was one of the best players for the Bearcats during the 1980s, finishing his career as the second all-time leading scorer in school history, averaging 15.7 points per game over his career. McClendon holds the record at UC for highest three point field goal percentage, at .476 during the 1986-87 season. He was a four year starter and was the lead scorer in three of his four seasons. He would be named to the Metro Conference Freshman Team in 1985 and as All-Metro Conference First Team in 1986 and 1987.

For his accomplishments, McClendon was inducted into the UC Athletics Hall of Fame in 1998.

== Business career ==
McClendon, despite his talent in basketball, decided to pursue a career in engineering. He would graduate from Cincinnati with a Bachelor of Science in computer & electrical engineering. McClendon has worked for Yum! Brands for a number of years, creating the position of Chief Sustainability Officer in 2010. In this role McClendon, helped Yum! Brands to be named as one of the 100 Best Corporate Citizens by Corporate Responsibility Magazine and added in 2017 to the Dow Jones Sustainability Index.

In 2019, McClendon was named Executive Director of the Green Sports Alliance.
