= Sean Chandler =

American football player (born 1996)

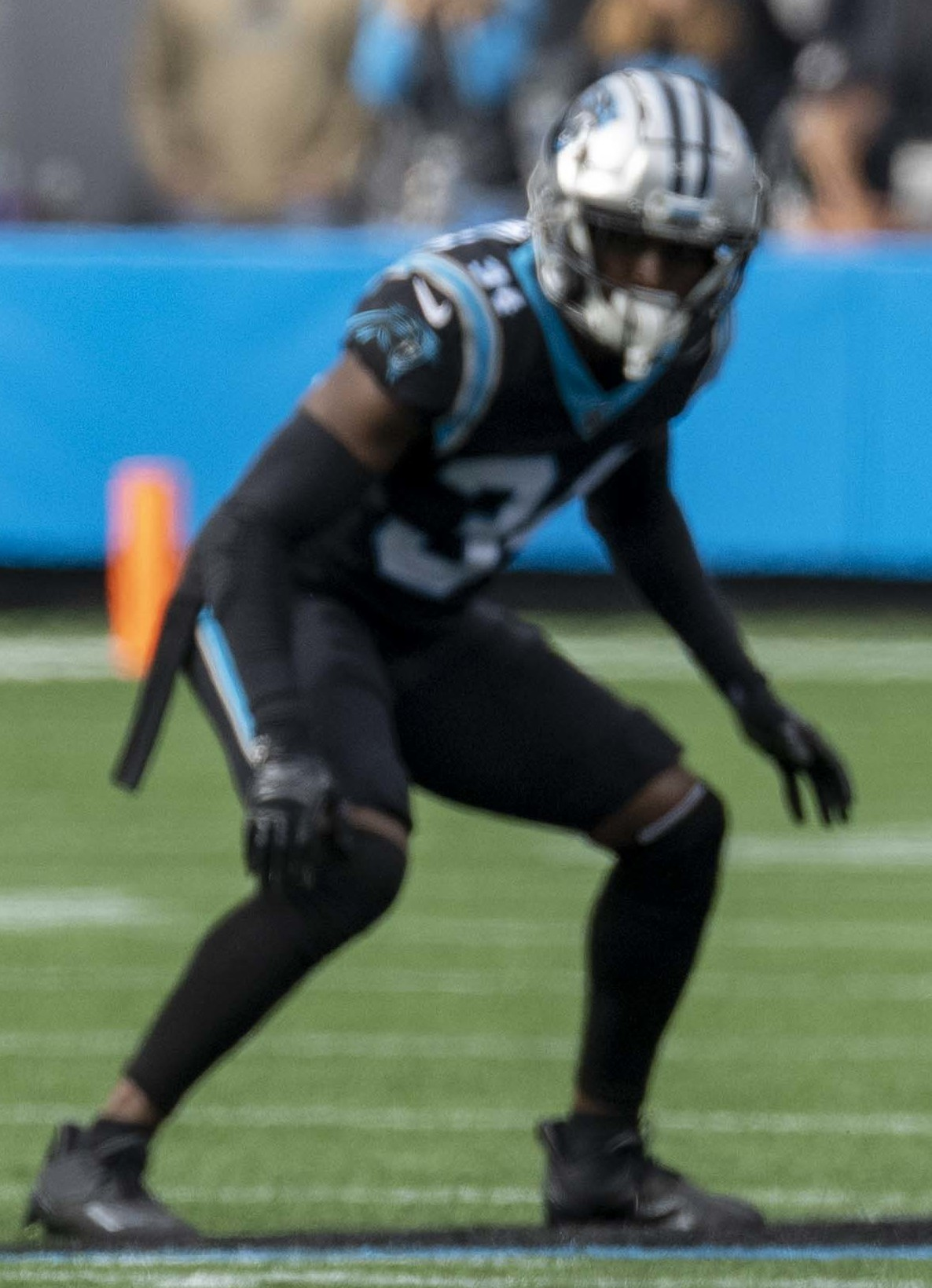
- Chandler with the Carolina Panthers in 2021

Profile
- Position: Safety

Personal information
- Born: April 27, 1996 (age 30); Camden, New Jersey, U.S.
- Listed height: 5 ft 10 in (1.78 m)
- Listed weight: 200 lb (91 kg)

Career information
- High school: Brimm Medical Arts / Camden (Camden, New Jersey)
- College: Temple (2014–2017)
- NFL draft: 2018: undrafted

Career history
- New York Giants (2018–2020); Carolina Panthers (2020–2022); Arizona Cardinals (2023)*; Washington Commanders (2023)*
- * Offseason or practice squad member only

Career NFL statistics
- Total tackles: 96
- Sacks: 1.0
- Forced fumbles: 1
- Fumble recoveries: 2
- Stats at Pro Football Reference

Sean Chandler (born April 27, 1996) is an American professional football safety. He played college football at Temple and signed with the New York Giants as an undrafted free agent in 2018.

== Early life ==
Chandler grew up in Camden, New Jersey and attended Brimm Medical Arts High School, which did not offer sports teams; as such, under district policy, he played football for Camden High School, where he was named the Philadelphia Inquirer Defensive Player of the Year in 2013 after accumulating eight interceptions as a senior.

== College career ==
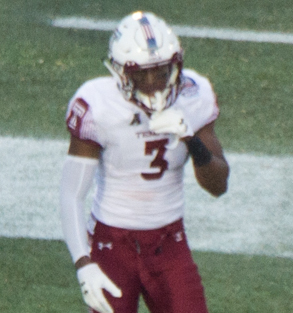
Chandler with Temple at the 2016 Military Bowl

Chandler was considered a three-star recruit by Rivals.com and chose Temple over an offer from Rutgers.

At Temple, Chandler played his freshman and sophomore seasons as a starting cornerback before becoming Temple's starting safety as a junior and senior. Chandler was an all-conference selection in 2015, 2016 and 2017. During his time at Temple, Chandler had 264 tackles, 13 tackles for a loss and 10 interceptions in 49 games.

== Professional career ==
=== Pre-draft ===
Coming out of Temple, Chandler was invited to the NFL Scouting Combine and was projected to be either a late-round or priority undrafted free agent selection in the 2018 NFL draft.

Pre-draft measurables
| Height | Weight | Arm length | Hand span | 40-yard dash | 20-yard shuttle | Vertical jump | Broad jump | Bench press |
|---|---|---|---|---|---|---|---|---|
| 5 ft 10 1/2 in (1.79 m) | 205 lb (93 kg) | 30 3/4 in (0.78 m) | 8 1/4 in (0.21 m) | 4.65 s | 4.62 s | 34 1/2 in (0.88 m) | 9 ft 11 in (3.02 m) | 16 reps |
All values from 2018 NFL Combine

=== New York Giants ===
After going undrafted in the 2018 NFL Draft, Chandler signed with the New York Giants as a rookie free agent on May 10, 2018. After a strong preseason, Chandler made the Giant's final 53-man roster.

On November 5, 2019, Chandler was waived by the Giants and re-signed to the practice squad. On December 10, he was re-signed to the active roster.

On September 6, 2020, Chandler was waived by the Giants, and was signed to the team's practice squad two days later. He was elevated to the active roster on September 14 for the team's week 1 game against the Pittsburgh Steelers, and reverted to the practice squad the next day. He was elevated again on September 19 for the team's week 2 game against the Chicago Bears, and reverted to the practice squad again after the game. He was promoted to the active roster on October 2, 2020, but waived four days later and re-signed to the practice squad on October 8.

=== Carolina Panthers ===
On October 23, 2020, Chandler was signed by the Carolina Panthers off the Giants practice squad. He was reunited with Panthers' head coach Matt Rhule, who previously served as his head coach at Temple. Chandler was waived by the Panthers on November 21, 2020, and re-signed to the practice squad three days later. He signed a reserve/future contract with the Panthers on January 4, 2021.

On March 15, 2022, Chandler signed a one-year contract extension with the Panthers.

Chandler was suspended the first two games of the 2023 season for violating the league’s policy on performance-enhancing substances.

=== Arizona Cardinals ===
On August 15, 2023, Chandler signed with the Arizona Cardinals. On August 28, Chandler was released by the Cardinals as part of final roster cuts before the start of the season.

=== Washington Commanders ===
On October 10, 2023, the Washington Commanders signed Chandler to their practice squad. He became a free agent when his practice squad contract expired after the season.
