= Fadil Diggs =

American football player (born 2001)

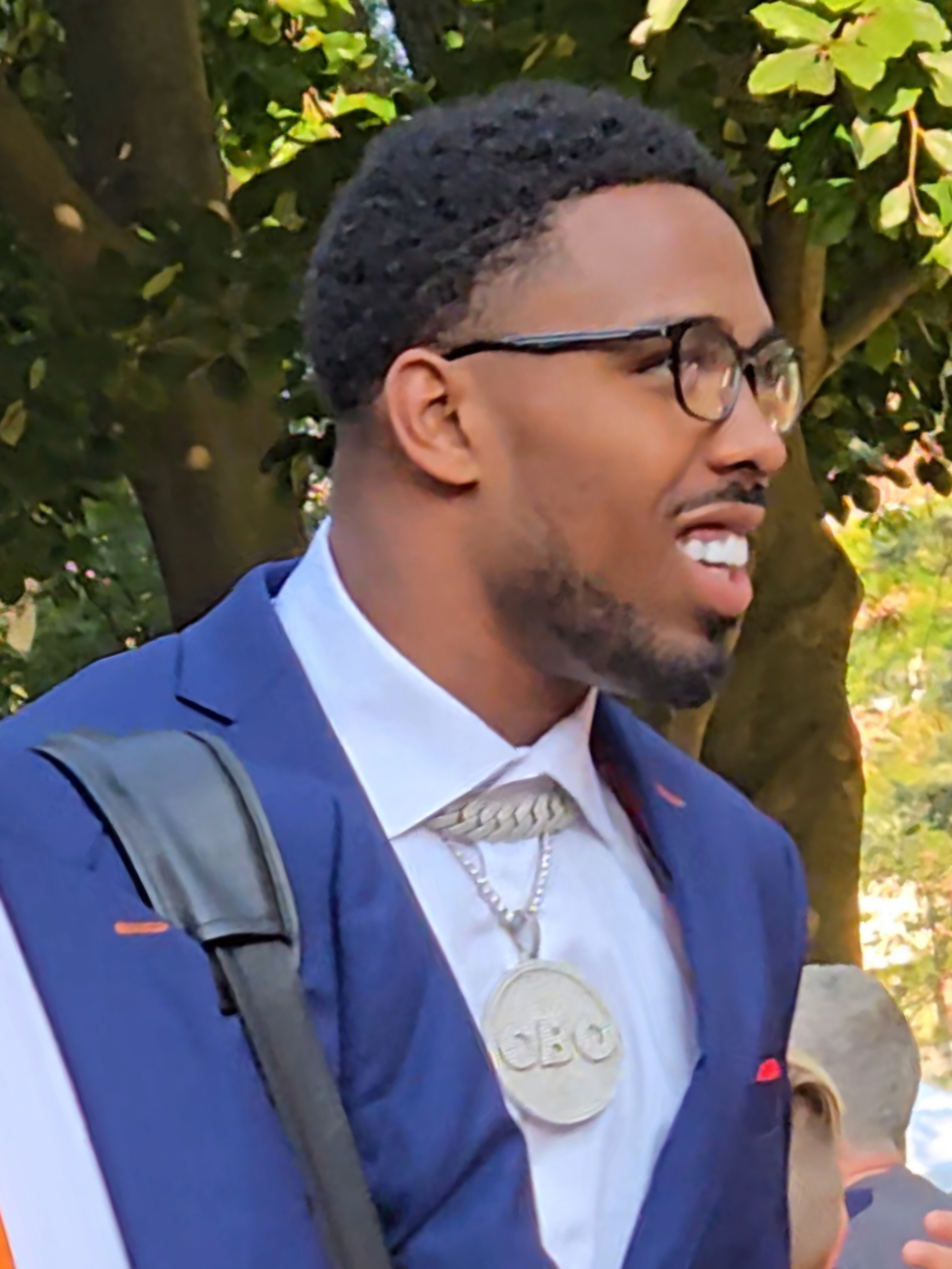
- Diggs with Syracuse in 2024

No. 40 – New Orleans Saints
- Position: Linebacker
- Roster status: Practice squad

Personal information
- Born: October 15, 2001 (age 25); East Camden, New Jersey, U.S.
- Listed height: 6 ft 4 in (1.93 m)
- Listed weight: 257 lb (117 kg)

Career information
- High school: Woodrow Wilson (Camden, New Jersey)
- College: Texas A&M (2020–2023); Syracuse (2024)
- NFL draft: 2025: 7th round, 254th overall pick

Career history
- New Orleans Saints (2025–present)*
- * Offseason or practice squad member only
- Stats at Pro Football Reference

Fadil Diggs (FAH-deel; born October 15, 2001) is an American professional football Linebacker for the New Orleans Saints of the National Football League (NFL). He played college football for the Texas A&M Aggies and Syracuse Orange. Diggs was selected by the Saints in the seventh round of the 2025 NFL draft.

== Early life ==
Diggs attended Woodrow Wilson High School in Camden, New Jersey. As a senior, playing both offense and defense, he recorded 65 catches for 1,031 yards and 11 touchdowns, and 95.5 tackles, 21 sacks, and five forced fumbles. As a result, he was named the New Jersey Gatorade Player of the Year. A four-star recruit, Diggs committed to play college football at Texas A&M University over offers from Georgia, Ohio State, and Tennessee.

== College career ==
=== Texas A&M ===
After playing sparingly in 2020, Diggs totaled nine tackles, 2.5 tackles for loss, and a sack in 2021. As a junior in 2023, he recorded 36 tackles, 11 tackles for loss, and four sacks. Following the conclusion of the season, he entered the transfer portal.

=== Syracuse ===
On December 19, 2024, Diggs announced that he would be transferring to Syracuse University to play for the Syracuse Orange. He was the team captain, and against UNLV, he tallied two sacks, being named the Nagurski Award's National Defensive Player of the Week for his performance.

== Professional career ==
Pre-draft measurables
Height	Weight	Arm length	Hand span	Wingspan	40-yard dash	10-yard split	20-yard split	20-yard shuttle	Vertical jump	Broad jump	Bench press
6 ft 4 3/8 in (1.94 m)	257 lb (117 kg)	33 3/8 in (0.85 m)	10 3/8 in (0.26 m)	6 ft 7 1/8 in (2.01 m)	4.57 s	1.60 s	2.67 s	4.39 s	30.5 in (0.77 m)	10 ft 1 in (3.07 m)	26 reps
All values from NFL Combine/Pro Day

Diggs was selected by the New Orleans Saints with the 254th overall pick in the seventh round of the 2025 NFL draft. On August 26, Diggs was waived by the Saints and re-signed to the practice squad the next day. He was promoted to the active roster on September 6, and made his NFL debut in the Saints' season-opening game against the Arizona Cardinals. Diggs was waived by New Orleans on September 8, and was subsequently re-signed to the team's practice squad two days later. On January 2, 2026, he was signed to the active roster.

On August 30, 2026, Diggs was waived by the Saints as a part of final roster cuts; he was re–signed to the team's practice squad the following day.
