= Camden Big Picture Learning Academy =

High school in Camden County, New Jersey, US

Location
- 1875 Park Boulevard; Camden, Camden County, New Jersey 08104; United States
- 39.933815°N 75.09735°W

Information
- Type: Public high school
- Motto: Educating Camden's Students One at a Time
- Established: 2005
- School district: Camden City School District
- NCES School ID: 340264000579
- Principal: Timothy L. Jenkins
- Faculty: 18.5 FTEs
- Grades: 9-12
- Enrollment: 150 (as of 2024–25)
- Student to teacher ratio: 8.1:1
- Team name: Trailblazers
- Website: camdencityschools.org/bpla/

Camden Big Picture Learning Academy (formerly MetEast High School) is a four-year public high school in the City of Camden, in Camden County, in the U.S. state of New Jersey, serving students in ninth through twelfth grades as part of the Camden City School District. The school opened in 2005 in conjunction with Big Picture Learning as an effort to prepare students for success in college through greater community involvement and mentoring.

As of the 2024–25 school year, the school had an enrollment of 150 students and 18.5 classroom teachers (on an FTE basis), for a student–teacher ratio of 8.1:1. There were 74 students (49.3% of enrollment) eligible for free lunch and none eligible for reduced-cost lunch.

== History ==
Starting in the 2021–22 school year, the high school moved into a new $133 million building on Park Boulevard that it shares with Brimm Medical Arts High School and Creative Arts Academy.

== Awards, recognition and rankings ==
The school was the 285th-ranked public high school in New Jersey out of 328 schools statewide in New Jersey Monthly magazine's September 2012 cover story on the state's "Top Public High Schools", after being ranked 211th in 2010 out of 322 schools listed.

== Administration ==
The school's principal is Timothy L. Jenkins.

== Notable alumni ==
- Brad Hawkins (born 1998), American football safety, who played for the New England Patriots of the National Football League.
