= Camden City School District =

School district in Camden County, New Jersey, US

Address
- 1033 Cambridge Street Camden, Camden County, New Jersey, 08105; United States
- Coordinates: 39.948058°N 75.126221°W

District information
- Grades: PreK to 12
- Superintendent: Alfonso Q. Llano Jr.
- Business administrator: Margaret McDonnell (interim)
- Schools: 19
- Affiliation: SDA District

Students and staff
- Enrollment: 7,553 (as of 2020–21)
- Faculty: 668.0 FTEs
- Student–teacher ratio: 11.3:1

Other information
- District Factor Group: A
- Website: camdencityschools.org
Ind.	Per pupil	District spending	Rank (*)	K-12 average	%± vs. average
1A	Total Spending	$26,998	102	$18,891	42.9%
1	Budgetary Cost	20,849	103	14,783	41.0%
2	Classroom Instruction	11,444	100	8,763	30.6%
6	Support Services	4,409	103	2,392	84.3%
8	Administrative Cost	1,791	93	1,485	20.6%
10	Operations & Maintenance	3,177	102	1,783	78.2%
13	Extracurricular Activities	113	5	268	−57.8%
16	Median Teacher Salary	61,203	28	64,043
Data from NJDoE 2014 Taxpayers' Guide to Education Spending. *Of K-12 districts with more than 3,500 students. Lowest spending=1; Highest=103

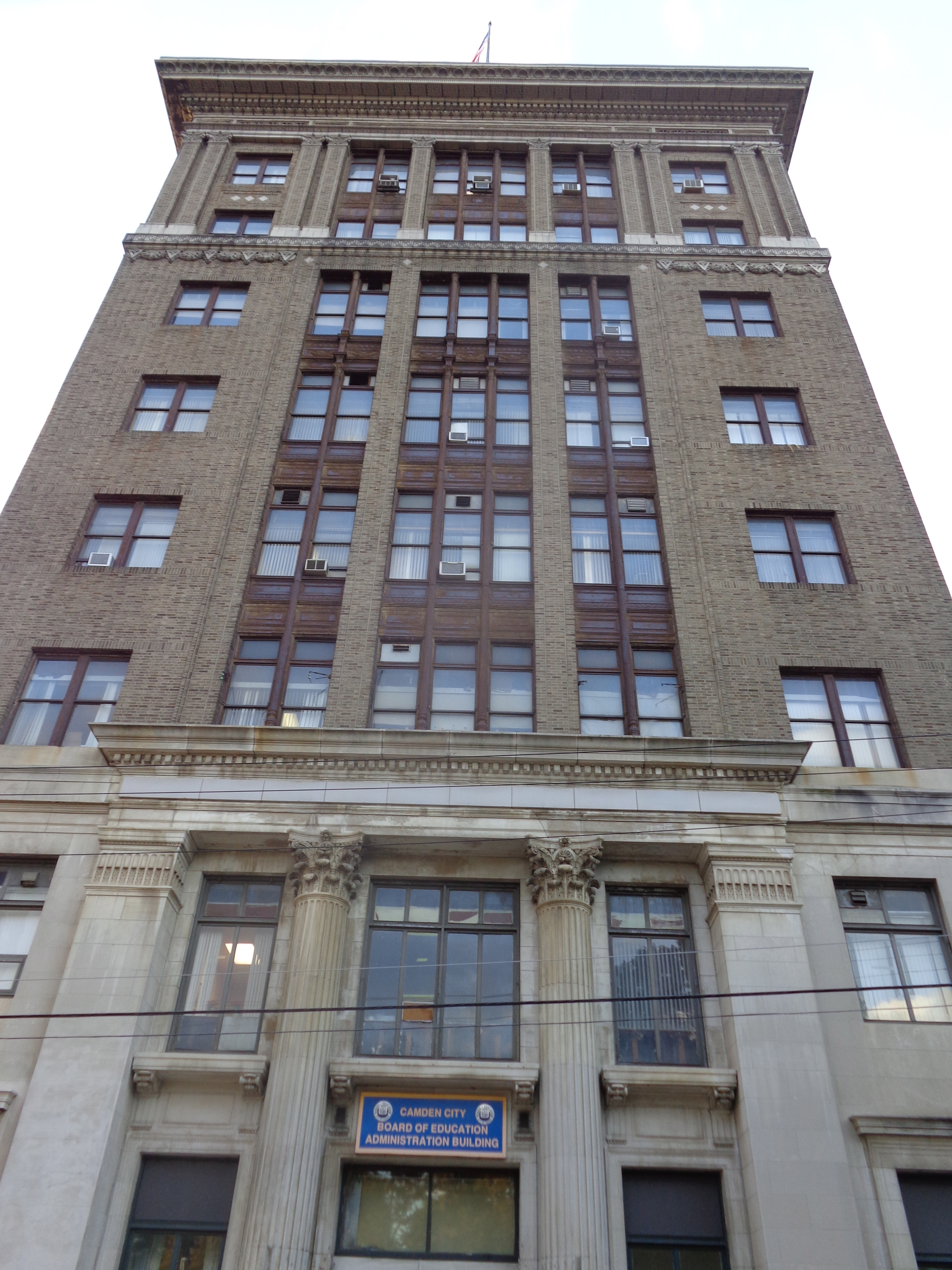
Board of Education Building

Camden City School District is a public school district that serves students in pre-Kindergarten through twelfth grade from the city of Camden, in Camden County, in the U.S. state of New Jersey. The district is one of 31 former Abbott districts statewide that were established pursuant to the decision by the New Jersey Supreme Court in Abbott v. Burke which are now referred to as "SDA Districts" based on the requirement for the state to cover all costs for school building and renovation projects in these districts under the supervision of the New Jersey Schools Development Authority. In 2013, after years of requests from local officials, New Jersey intervened in Camden City, making the school district state-run under the leadership of Superintendent Paymon Rouhanifard.

As of the 2020–21 school year, the district, comprised of 19 schools, had an enrollment of 7,553 students and 668.0 classroom teachers (on an FTE basis), for a student–teacher ratio of 11.3:1.

The district is guided by its school improvement plan, Putting Students First.

== History ==
The Board of Education of the City of Camden was established by Isaac W. Mickle, who was entrusted by The Camden Board of School Trustees to borrow money to build a schoolhouse and apply to become a board of education. Mickle would go on to become the first secretary of the board of education.

The first meeting of the Board of Education of the City of Camden was in City Hall on April 3, 1854. The first three members elected into the board were from each political ward: Joseph Kimble (North Ward), Ebenezer Nichols (Middle Ward), and Isaac Lloyd (South Ward).

The district previously followed de jure educational segregation in the United States, where it officially segregated elementary schools on the basis of race. This ended in September 1946.

In 1948 it had two elementary schools entirely with black students and teachers. John Greenleaf Whittier Elementary School was designated as a school for all black children, even if it wasn't in their attendance zone.

In June 2004 the school district enacted a mandatory school uniform policy for all students. 10 schools had already started their own uniform policies. Uniform policies were enforced effective September 2004.

In 2011, during a review of the proposed budget for the 2011–2012 school year, it was announced that Creative Arts High School would be merging with Morgan Village Middle School. A new building was built to accommodate both high school and middle school students. The new building also housed the facilities necessary to sustain and expand the creative arts programs.

Other schools merging that year were Washington Elementary School with Veterans Middle School and Parkside Elementary School with Hatch Middle School. These changes were intended to address schools with low enrollment, specifically schools with less than 300 students.

In 2013, the district had 15,161 students. In March 2015, the district announced that it was closing the John Greenleaf Whittier Family School at the end of the 2014–15 school year. As part of the changes, Henry L. Bonsall Family School, East Camden Middle School, Francis X. McGraw Elementary School and Rafael Cordero Molina Elementary School were all to be transferred to renaissance school operators, who were responsible for making significant renovations to the District-owned buildings.

In March 2013, at Woodrow Wilson High School, when Governor Chris Christie announced that the state of New Jersey would be taking over administration of the public schools in the city of Camden. The Department of Education had done an investigation that found in 2012, graduation rates fell to 49.27%, down from 56.89% the year before. From 2011 to 2012, only 2% of Camden students scored above a 1550 out of a possible 2400 on the Scholastic Aptitude Test (SAT), compared with 43% students nationally. Only 19% and 30.4% of third-through eighth-grade students tested proficient in language arts and in math, respectively, which were far below the state average. Christie said, "I can't be a guarantor of results, none of us can, but just because we can't guarantee a positive result or because there have been some mixed results in the past, should not be used as an excuse for inaction."

The district had been classified by the New Jersey Department of Education as being in District Factor Group "A", the lowest of eight groupings. District Factor Groups organize districts statewide to allow comparison by common socioeconomic characteristics of the local districts. From lowest socioeconomic status to highest, the categories are A, B, CD, DE, FG, GH, I and J.

In 2015, a new, $41 million, 110,000-square-foot (10,000 m^{2}) school opened on Broadway, and in 2017 two additional brand new renaissance school buildings opened, one in the Cramer Hill neighborhood and the other in Haddon Avenue in Whitman Park. Working in partnership with the school district, today renaissance schools serve about 4,200 students and boast rising test results.

In 2016, three years after the State of New Jersey takeover, former superintendent Paymon Rouhanifard noted the changes made within the district that contributed to a 64% graduation rate (up from 49%) and 15% decrease in the drop out rate within the Camden City School District:

- the creation of new staff positions that specialize in helping students with discipline and learning
- the implementation of a required SAT/ACT test-taking day for all high school students
- the creation of a program for absentee students in which officials visit families to address the causes of the absences

In 2016, the district partnered with Camden's six charter school operators to introduce a city-wide enrollment system to create a simple, equitable way for families to choose to attend any district, charter, or renaissance school. Since then, all but one of Camden's publicly funded schools participate in Camden Enrollment.

In 2016, the state committed $133 million to renovate Camden High School. The graduation rate had gone up by 17 percentage points in five years, while the dropout rate had been cut in half. The District-led pre-school program has become a highlight.

In 2016, Cooper B. Hatch Family School and MetEast High School were consolidated into the building that had been occupied by the Hatch School, providing access to a gymnasium and auditorium for students in the high school program; the combined school, serving grades 6–12, has since been renamed as the Camden Big Picture Learning Academy.

In the wake of declining enrollment, poor performance and a deteriorating facility constructed in 1926, Charles Sumner Elementary School was closed at the end of the 2016–17 school year.

In 2017–18, Camden students who took the state PARCC test showed year-on-year progress since the test was first administered in 2014–15. About 15.7% of district students were proficient in language arts, with about 11% testing proficient in math, compared to 50% statewide on both subjects.

In 2018, Riletta Twyne Cream Family School and Yorkship Family School, both K-8 schools, were closed due to weather-related problems. R.T. Cream Family School, housed in building opened in 1991, experienced water pipe damage due to the pipes being exposed to cold temperatures by being located close to the roof of the building. Yorkship Family School's 100-year-old building, on the other hand, experienced heating problems, and had to be closed alongside R.T. Cream Family School.

In May 2018, former superintendent Rouhanifard announced that the district would be piloting a gifted and talented program available to 130 third through fifth grade students in H.B. Wilson and Catto Family Schools. Formerly known as the CHIPS program, this pilot created new teaching positions for gifted and talented educators and endeavored to encourage gifted students to accomplish the most with their academic talents though fun, developmental activities, field trips, and guest speakers. To get into the program, students had to pass an assessment. New students had the same opportunity, and the program would be open to all grade levels in the school if the first year ended successfully. H.B. Wilson and Catto Family Schools were chosen for their diversity, but if all goes well, the program is anticipated to be established in more district schools.

In April 2019, acting superintendent Katrina McCombs announced that, due to a $27 million deficit, the Camden City School District plans to compensate by closing Veterans Memorial Family School by the end of June. Riletta Twyne Cream Family School will be converted into an early childhood center. Educators will also be affected, as Onome Pela-Emore, schools spokeswoman, anticipates that the district could lay off up to 300 staff members. A similar announcement was made in April 2014. Then-superintendent Paymon Rouhanifard, in the face of a $75 million deficit, announced that the district intended to phase out 575 staff positions, with the potential for layoffs.

As of April 2019, Superintendent Katrina McCombs announced that the district has applied for a $122 million state grant to address the repairs needed in the older buildings in the district. This grant is expected to prevent any more school closures.

By 2021, enrollment was down to more than 6,000, a decline of 60% from 2013.

In January 2022, the district renamed Woodrow Wilson High School to Eastside High School, in light of segregationist policies of the former president.

== Awards, recognition and rankings ==
George Washington School was recognized by Governor Jim McGreevey in 2003 as one of 25 schools selected statewide for the First Annual Governor's School of Excellence award.

For 2022, the Camden City School District received Bronze Awards from Sustainable Jersey for Schools for all 17 school facilities.

== Schools ==
Schools in the district, with 2020–21 enrollment data from the National Center for Education Statistics are:

Preschool

- Martha F. Wilson Early Childhood Development Center (154; PreK-K)
  - Loray Vaughn, principal
- Riletta Twyne Cream Early Childhood Center (85; PreK)
  - Medinah Dyer, principal

Elementary schools

- Octavius V. Catto Community Family School (606; PreK-8)
  - Byron R. Dixon, principal
- Cooper's Poynt Family School (407; PreK-8)
  - Janine Casella, principal
- Dr. Henry H. Davis Family School (321; PreK-8)
  - Sharon K. Woodridge, principal
- Thomas H. Dudley Family School (404; PreK-8)
  - Evelyn Ruiz, principal
- Forest Hill Elementary School (305; K-5)
  - Darrell Staton, principal
- Morgan Village Middle School (NA; 6-8)
  - Jahnia Robinson, principal
- Veterans Memorial Family School (337; PreK-8)
  - Danette Sapowsky, principal
- Henry B. Wilson Family School (537; PreK-8)
  - Nicole Harrigan, principal
- Yorkship Family School (434; PreK-5)
  - It opened circa 1920.
  - Lana L.P. Murray, principal

High schools

- Brimm Medical Arts High School (175; 9–12)
  - Corinne J. Macrina, principal
- Camden Big Picture Learning Academy (196; 6–12)
  - Timothy L. Jenkins, principal
- Camden High School (347; 9–12)
  - Aaron Bullock, principal
- Creative Arts Academy (290; 6–12)
  - Davida Coe Brockington, principal
- Eastside High School (784; 9–12)
  - Gloria Martinez-Vega, principal
- Pride Academy (63; 6–12)
  - Herbert Simons, principal

== Criticism ==
In the 2000s, the Camden school system was labeled as corrupt by some individuals; a July 6, 2006 editorial written by Sherry Wolkoff appeared in The Philadelphia Inquirer. The editorial, titled "Children of Camden get short end of the pencil," asserts that Camden school officials obtain unjustified bonuses while Camden schoolchildren have few resources.

In early 2006, allegations were also made that school officials had altered standardized test scores to improve Camden's national school ratings. "We know that, with respect to the test scores, those scores were not legitimately achieved," says Lucille Davy, New Jersey's acting commissioner of education. "There was manipulation of the process."

In December 2013, the district reported that only three high school students had met the "college ready" standard, based on a minimum combined score of 1550 on the SAT.

In the wake of 163 violent incidents in the district during the 2012–13 school year, the district undertook a $1.4 million project in 2014 to add digital cameras and electronic controls at doors to limit access to high school buildings.

In January 2024, a lawsuit was filed which alleged that Camden Advisory School Board President Wasim Muhammad started sexually abusing a female student at Camden's Cooper B. Hatch Middle School in 1994. The alleged abuse was reported to have continued for years, with Muhammad, who at the time was known as Donald Walker, also abusing her at motels in nearby Cherry Hill. An attempt to file criminal charges proved ineffective due to the state's statute of limitations. Muhammad, who is scheduled to face a civil trial in February 2024, soon afterwards took a leave of absence pending the outcome of his trial. New Jersey Governor Phil Murphy was among those who called for Muhammad to resign. In addition to Muhammad, the South Jersey school system, which includes Camden, was named as a defendant in the civil lawsuit as well.

== Administration ==
Core members of the district's administration are:

- Alfonso Q. Llano Jr., superintendent
- Margaret McDonnell, interim school business administrator and board secretary

The Camden district is one of two districts statewide that operate under state intervention with (the other is the Paterson Public Schools), and has been under state supervision since June 2013. The district's superintendent is appointed by the commissioner of the New Jersey Department of Education The district has a nine-member advisory board that acts in lieu of a board of education. The members of the advisory board are appointed by the mayor to serve three-year terms on a staggered basis, with three seats up for reappointment each year. A student representative selected from the district's high schools also serves on the board.
