= John Williams (basketball, born 1966) =

American basketball player (born 1966)

Personal information
- Born: October 26, 1966 (age 60) Los Angeles, California, U.S.
- Listed height: 6 ft 8 in (2.03 m)
- Listed weight: 235 lb (107 kg)

Career information
- High school: Crenshaw (Los Angeles, California)
- College: LSU (1984–1986)
- NBA draft: 1986: 1st round, 12th overall pick
- Drafted by: Washington Bullets
- Playing career: 1986–2002
- Position: Power forward / center
- Number: 34, 24, 66

Career history
- 1986–1991: Washington Bullets
- 1992–1994: Los Angeles Clippers
- 1994–1995: Indiana Pacers
- 1997–1998: Covirán Granada
- 1998–1999: TDK Manresa
- 2000–2002: Fórum Filatélico
- 2002: Lucéntum Alicante

Career highlights
- First-team All-SEC (1986); Mr. Basketball USA (1984); First-team Parade All-American (1984); McDonald's All-American MVP (1984); 2× California Mr. Basketball (1983, 1984)

Career NBA statistics
- Points: 4,406 (10.1 ppg)
- Rebounds: 2,201 (5.1 rpg)
- Assists: 1,262 (2.9 apg)
- Stats at NBA.com
- Stats at Basketball Reference

John Sam Williams (born October 26, 1966) is an American former basketball player who played professionally for several seasons in the National Basketball Association (NBA) and the Liga ACB.

His girth earned him the nickname "Hot Plate" Williams, in part to help distinguish him from John "Hot Rod" Williams of the Cleveland Cavaliers who likewise played college basketball in Louisiana (at Tulane University) and who also entered the NBA in 1986. Despite his size, in which he ballooned to close to 260 pounds by the time he was drafted, Williams was a highly skilled basketball player. He was in particular an exceptionally good passer, and averaged over 4 assists per game in 3 separate seasons, an excellent average for a player his size. He was frequently used as a point forward, handling the ball and conducting the offense.

== College career ==
Williams played collegiately for LSU, and was drafted into the National Basketball Association by the Washington Bullets in 1986 with the 12th overall pick.

== Professional career ==
As a rookie, Williams averaged just under ten points and five rebounds per game for the Bullets. He improved significantly his second season, and started 37 of 82 games. The 1988–89 NBA season, his third, was clearly his best, as he achieved career-high season totals in almost every statistical category, despite coming off the bench in all but one game.

Williams' productivity declined in the five injury-plagued seasons that followed. He missed more than half of four of those five seasons due to various injuries, which, though not necessarily caused by his weight, were certainly aggravated by it. His eight-year NBA career included five seasons with the Bullets, two with the Los Angeles Clippers, and one (his final season) with the Indiana Pacers. He left the NBA in 1995, but went on to play 132 games over 6 seasons in the Spanish Liga ACB, averaging 15.6 points and 7.3 rebounds.

== Weight issues and player profile ==
Williams' eating problems and weight issues were as a result of stress and depression. By the time he entered the draft, he lost his grandmother, two childhood friends, while supporting his mother, grandfather, and children from previous marriages. His weight issues got so bad that Bullets and Clippers put him on weight reduction programs, and suspended him with no pay.

By the time he played for the Pacers, his offensive skills and court vision had not diminished, but his vertical leap and stamina suffered significantly due to his weight, making him a defensive liability. At his lowest weight, he managed to drop to 235 lbs, but he gained weight back up to about 260 lbs.

== Career statistics ==
Legend
GP	Games played	GS	Games started	MPG	Minutes per game
FG%	Field goal percentage	3P%	3-point field goal percentage	FT%	Free throw percentage
RPG	Rebounds per game	APG	Assists per game	SPG	Steals per game
BPG	Blocks per game	PPG	Points per game	**Bold**	Career high
*	Led the league

=== NBA ===
==== Regular season ====
Year	Team	GP	GS	MPG	FG%	3P%	FT%	RPG	APG	SPG	BPG	PPG
1986–87	Washington	78	6	22.7	.454	.222	.646	4.7	2.4	**1.7**	.4	9.2
1987–88	Washington	**82**	**37**	29.6	.469	.132	.734	5.4	2.8	1.4	.4	12.8
1988–89	Washington	**82***	1	29.4	.466	.268	**.776**	7.0	4.3	**1.7**	**.9**	13.7
1989–90	Washington	18	18	**35.1**	'**.474**	.111	.774	**7.6**	**4.7**	1.2	.5	**18.2**
1990–91	Washington	33	11	28.5	.417	.244	.753	5.4	4.0	1.2	.2	12.5
1992–93	L.A. Clippers	74	8	22.1	.430	.226	.543	4.3	1.9	1.1	.3	6.6
1993–94	L.A. Clippers	34	6	21.3	.431	.250	.667	3.7	2.9	.7	.3	5.6
1994–95	Indiana	34	0	11.8	.357	**.333**	.560	1.8	.8	.3	.1	2.9
Career		435	87	25.2	.451	.225	.704	5.1	2.9	1.3	.4	10.1

==== Playoffs ====
Year	Team	GP	GS	MPG	FG%	3P%	FT%	RPG	APG	SPG	BPG	PPG
1987	Washington	3	0	16.3	**.571**	.000	.571	3.7	.7	.7	.0	6.7
1988	Washington	**5**	**5**	**37.0**	.479	.000	**.594**	**5.8**	**4.6**	**1.6**	**.8**	**13.0**
1993	L.A. Clippers	**5**	0	19.6	.222	**.667**	.500	2.8	1.4	1.0	.0	2.2
Career		13	5	25.5	.438	.400	.585	4.2	2.3	1.2	.3	7.4
