= William Bedford (basketball) =

American basketball player (born 1963)

Personal information
- Born: December 14, 1963 (age 62) Memphis, Tennessee, U.S.
- Listed height: 7 ft 0 in (2.13 m)
- Listed weight: 225 lb (102 kg)

Career information
- High school: Melrose (Memphis, Tennessee)
- College: Memphis (1983–1986)
- NBA draft: 1986: 1st round, 6th overall pick
- Drafted by: Phoenix Suns
- Playing career: 1986–1993
- Position: Center
- Number: 50, 25, 20, 00

Career history
- 1986–1987: Phoenix Suns
- 1987–1992: Detroit Pistons
- 1992–1993: San Antonio Spurs
- 1993: Oklahoma City Cavalry
- 1993: Grand Rapids Hoops

Career highlights
- NBA champion (1990); Third-team All-American – AP (1986); First-team All-Metro Conference (1986)
- Stats at NBA.com
- Stats at Basketball Reference

William Bedford (born December 14, 1963) is an American former professional basketball player who was selected by the Phoenix Suns in the first round (6th pick overall) of the 1986 NBA draft after playing at Memphis State University (now known as the University of Memphis). Bedford, a 7'0" center, played for the Suns, Detroit Pistons and the San Antonio Spurs in six NBA seasons, averaging 4.1 points and 2.4 rebounds per game in his career.

== NBA career ==
Originally projected as a star player, Bedford's NBA career was marred by drug use, and he missed the 1988–89 NBA season as a result, during which the Pistons won the championship. He returned to the Pistons the following season and played a limited role on their 1989–90 team that successfully repeated as champion, seeing action in 42 of 82 regular-season games.

On November 6, 1990, in a game against the Seattle SuperSonics, Bedford set an NBA record for fewest minutes played in a game with three or more three-pointers made, shooting 3-of-3 from deep in a single minute. These were three of five total three-pointers he made in 60 games during the 1990–91 NBA season, and of seven overall in his career.

== Post-NBA and legal troubles ==
Bedford's drug problems continued after he left the NBA. He was arrested for drug possession twice between 1996 and 1997. In 2001, Bedford was accused of transporting 25 pounds of marijuana in Michigan. After the Michigan arrest, he was arrested two more times for marijuana, and in 2003 was given a 10-year prison sentence. Bedford was released from prison in November 2011. As of 2012, he was coaching basketball in Memphis.

== Career statistics ==
Legend
GP	Games played	GS	Games started	MPG	Minutes per game
FG%	Field goal percentage	3P%	3-point field goal percentage	FT%	Free throw percentage
RPG	Rebounds per game	APG	Assists per game	SPG	Steals per game
BPG	Blocks per game	PPG	Points per game	**Bold**	Career high
†	Won an NBA championship

=== NBA ===
==== Regular season ====
Year	Team	GP	GS	MPG	FG%	3P%	FT%	RPG	APG	SPG	BPG	PPG
1986–87	Phoenix	50	**18**	**19.6**	.397	.000	.581	**4.9**	**1.1**	**.4**	**.7**	**6.7**
1987–88	Detroit	38	0	7.8	.436	–	.565	1.7	.1	.2	.4	2.7
1989–90†	Detroit	42	0	5.9	.432	.167	.409	1.4	.1	.1	.4	2.8
1990–91	Detroit	**60**	4	9.4	**.438**	.385	**.705**	2.2	.5	.0	.6	4.5
1991–92	Detroit	32	8	11.3	.413	.000	.636	2.0	.4	.2	.6	3.6
1992–93	San Antonio	16	0	4.1	.333	**1.000**	.500	.6	.0	.0	.1	1.6
Career		238	30	10.6	.416	.318	.605	2.4	.5	.2	.5	4.1

==== Playoffs ====
Year	Team	GP	GS	MPG	FG%	3P%	FT%	RPG	APG	SPG	BPG	PPG
1990†	Detroit	5	0	3.8	.167	–	**1.000**	.4	.0	.0	.2	.8
1991	Detroit	**8**	**3**	8.1	.208	.000	.643	**2.8**	**.5**	.3	**.5**	2.4
1992	Detroit	1	0	**9.0**	**.500**	–	–	2.0	.0	**1.0**	.0	**6.0**
Career		14	3	6.8	.250	.000	.688	1.9	.3	.2	.4	2.1
