= Eastside High School (Camden, New Jersey) =

High school in Camden County, New Jersey, US

Location
- 3100 Federal Street; Camden, Camden County, New Jersey 08105; United States; 39.94724°N 75.078459°W

Information
- Former names: Woodrow Wilson High School
- Type: Public high school
- Established: 1930
- School district: Camden City School District
- NCES School ID: 340264001348
- Principal: Gloria Martinez-Vega
- Faculty: 63.0 FTEs
- Grades: 9-12
- Enrollment: 593 (as of 2023–24)
- Student to teacher ratio: 9.4:1
- Colors: Orange and Black
- Athletics conference: Olympic Conference (general); West Jersey Football League (football)
- Team name: Tigers
- Rival: Camden High School
- Website: camdencityschools.org/eastsidehs/

Eastside High School, formerly Woodrow Wilson High School, is a four-year public high school in the City of Camden, in Camden County, in the U.S. state of New Jersey, serving students in ninth through twelfth grades as part of the Camden City School District. In June 2020, it was announced that the school would be renamed; the change from Woodrow Wilson High School was made official in January 2022.

As of the 2023–24 school year, the school had an enrollment of 593 students and 63.0 classroom teachers (on an FTE basis), for a student–teacher ratio of 9.4:1. There were 188 students (31.7% of enrollment) eligible for free lunch and none listed as eligible for reduced-cost lunch.

== History ==
The school, which was long named in honor of President Woodrow Wilson, was opened in 1930 as a junior high school. Wilson, a Democrat was the 28th president of the United States and 34th Governor of New Jersey. It was converted to a high school in 1933.

The school had been accredited by the Middle States Association of Colleges and Schools Commissions on Elementary and Secondary Schools until 2011, when the school's accreditation status was removed.

In June 2020, Camden School Superintendent Katrina McCombs announced that the district would rename the school due to Wilson's racist views. A committee consisting of community members, students, alumni and administrators will determine the new name. The school was formally renamed to Eastside High School in January 2022.

A project started to redevelop the school campus. The ex-Cramer School was to be used as temporary housing.

== Awards, recognition and rankings ==
The school was the 314th-ranked public high school in New Jersey out of 339 schools statewide in New Jersey Monthly magazine's September 2014 cover story on the state's "Top Public High Schools", using a new ranking methodology. The school had been ranked 300th in the state of 328 schools in 2012, after being ranked 321st in 2010 out of 322 schools listed. The magazine ranked the school 315th in 2008 out of 316 schools. The school was also ranked 315th in the magazine's September 2006 issue, which surveyed 316 schools across the state.

== Athletics ==
The Eastside High School Tigers compete in the Olympic Conference, which is comprised of public and private high schools in Burlington, Camden and Gloucester counties, and operates under the aegis of the New Jersey State Interscholastic Athletic Association (NJSIAA). With 814 students in grades 10-12, the school was classified by the NJSIAA for the 2019–20 school year as Group III for most athletic competition purposes, which included schools with an enrollment of 761 to 1,058 students in that grade range. The football team competes in the Liberty Division of the 94-team West Jersey Football League superconference and was classified by the NJSIAA as Group II South for football for 2024–2026, which included schools with 514 to 685 students.

The boys' basketball team won the Group III state championship in 1949 (defeating Hillside High School in the tournament final), 1978 (vs. Malcolm X Shabazz High School) and 1985 (vs. Rahway High School), and won the Group IV title in 1970 (vs. East Orange High School). An estimated 4,000 spectators watched the 1949 team win the Group III state title with a 45-43 win against Hillside on a basket scored in the last minute of the championship game. The 1970 team won their 27th consecutive game and the Group IV title with an 82-71 win against East Orange in the playoff finals in front of a crowd of 10,000 at Convention Hall in Atlantic City. The 2004 boys' basketball team took the South, Group III state sectionals with an 83-75 win over crosstown rival Camden High School.

The boys track team won the Group III spring / outdoor track state championship in 1984 (as co-champion) and 1996.

The boys track team won the indoor relay championship in Group III in 1993, 1995 and 1998. The girls team won the Group III title in 2000, 2001 and 2006, and won the Group II title in 2005 (as co-champion).

The girls' basketball team won the Group III state championship in 1996 (defeating Malcolm X Shabazz High School in the tournament final), 1997 (vs. Warren Hills Regional High School), 2005 (vs. Northern Highlands Regional High School) and 2014 (vs. West Morris Central High School). The team won the 2005 South, Group III state sectional championship with a 67-31 win over Timber Creek Regional High School. The team won the 2005 Group III state championship with a 73-44 win in the semifinals over Monmouth Regional High School and 1 56-47 win over Northern Highlands to take the title. The team moved on to face other state champions, and with a 47-32 win over Pascack Valley High School in the tournament semifinal, and a 64-45 win over St. John Vianney High School won the 2005 Tournament of Champions. In 2006, the team won the South, Group III sectional title with a 55-52 win against Ocean City High School in the tournament final. The 2007 team won the South, Group III sectional championship with a 78-60 win versus runner-up Ocean City High School. The team won the program's fourth state title with a 70-64 win in the 2014 Group III championship game against West Morris Central High School.

The football team won the NJSIAA South Jersey Group III state sectional championship in 2001, 2018 and 2019. The 2001 team won the South Jersey Group III sectional title with a 27-14 win over Egg Harbor Township High School in the championship game. The program won its second title in 2018 with a 22-14 win against Burlington Township High School in the playoff finals. The team won its second consecutive South Jersey Group III title in 2019 with a 54-30 win against Somerville High School and went on to win the South / Central Group III bowl game with a 12-7 win against Wall High School in the regional bowl game.

The girls team won the NJSIAA spring / outdoor track Group III state championship in 2004 and 2006.

== Administration ==
The school's principal is Gloria Martinez-Vega. Her core administration team includes two lead educators.

== Notable people ==
=== Alumni ===
- Rashad Baker (born 1982, class of 2000), safety who played in the NFL for the Buffalo Bills, Minnesota Vikings, New England Patriots, Oakland Raiders and Philadelphia Eagles
- James Cardwell (1921-1954), actor who appeared in the film The Fighting Sullivans
- Donovin Darius (born 1975, class of 1994), Safety who played in the NFL for the Jacksonville Jaguars
- Fadil Diggs, college football defensive lineman for the Syracuse Orange football team
- Lorenzo Freeman (1964-2016), defensive tackle who played in the NFL for the Pittsburgh Steelers and the New York Giants
- Angel Fuentes (born 1961, class of 1980), politician who served in the General Assembly from 2009 until June 2015, where he represented the 5th Legislative District
- Jamaal Green (born 1980), American football defensive end who played in the NFL for the Philadelphia Eagles, Chicago Bears, and the Washington Redskins
- John J. Horn (1917-1999), labor leader and politician who served in both houses of the New Jersey Legislature before being nominated to serve as commissioner of the New Jersey Department of Labor and Industry
- Lance Manga (born 1956), former international rugby union player who played for the U.S. national team
- Turk McBride (born 1985, class of 2003), defensive lineman for the Kansas City Chiefs
- Fang Mitchell (born 1948), former head coach of the Coppin State Eagles men's basketball team
- Frank Moran (born 1968), Mayor of Camden since 2018
- Antwine Perez (born 1988), free safety for the Maryland Terrapins football team
- Tommy Roberts (1928–2024), radio and TV broadcaster who launched simulcast in 1984, a television feed of horse races to racetracks, casinos and off-track betting facilities, enabling gamblers to watch and bet on live racing from all over the world
- Mike Rozier (born 1961, class of 1979), football player who won the Heisman Trophy in 1983
- Bill Singletary (born 1951), American football linebacker for the New York Giants and Philadelphia Bell.
- William Spearman (born 1958), politician who has represented the 5th Legislative District in the New Jersey General Assembly since 2018
- Howard Unruh (1921-2009, class of 1939), mass shooter

=== Faculty ===
- Thomas Tapeh (born 1980), football coach and former NFL fullback who played for the Philadelphia Eagles and the Minnesota Vikings
- Gary Williams (born 1945), formerly the basketball coach at WWHS and former head coach of the Maryland Terrapins men's basketball team
- Darrell Wilson (born 1958), football coach who began his coaching career at Woodrow Wilson, where he had a 65-18 record
