= Camden High School (New Jersey) =

High school in Camden County, New Jersey, US

Location
- 1700 Park Boulevard; Camden, Camden County, New Jersey 08103; United States; 39.934195°N 75.0982°W

Information
- Type: Public high school
- Established: 1891
- School district: Camden City School District
- NCES School ID: 340264001346
- Principal: James Thompson
- Faculty: 47.5 FTEs
- Enrollment: 425 (as of 2024–25)
- Student to teacher ratio: 9.0:1
- Colors: Purple and Gold
- Athletics conference: Olympic Conference (general); West Jersey Football League (football)
- Team name: Panthers
- Rivals: Camden Catholic High School; Eastside High
- Website: camdencityschools.org/chs/

Camden High School is a four-year comprehensive community public high school that serves students between ninth grade and twelfth grade from the city of Camden, in Camden County, in the U.S. state of New Jersey. The school is part of the Camden City School District, which is classified as an Abbott District. The school, established in 1891, celebrated its centennial in 1991. The school was originally known as the Camden Manual Training and High School, admitting its first class of 48 boys in 1891, with girls entering the school three years later. The school had been accredited by the Middle States Association of Colleges and Schools Commission on Elementary and Secondary Schools from 1929 until 2011, when the accredited status was removed.

As of the 2024–25 school year, the school had an enrollment of 425 students and 47.5 classroom teachers (on an FTE basis), for a student–teacher ratio of 9.0:1. There were 231 students (54.4% of enrollment) eligible for free lunch and none eligible for reduced-cost lunch.

== History ==
Camden High School was established in 1891 and was known as the Camden Manual Training High School. The school was built in a similar styles of the Center Philadelphia high schools, which were known to have "cutting edge innovation." It was located on 123 Federal Street in 1891. The school was designed by architects Arthur Truscott and Pail Armon Davis III. In 1891, the school accepted 48 boys; three years later, the first group of girls was accepted. Due to the rapid increase in the population of the school, the school had to expand and relocate to Haddon and Newton Avenues.

On May 9, 1969, a group of 100 white residents marched to the home of Camden Mayor Alfred R. Pierce to insist that white students receive protection from the black students who were the majority at Camden High School. Black students were fighting for administrative and curriculum changes, wanted more courses on African American culture and history, and sought the appointment of an African American principal and athletic coaches. The mayor planned to call in the police to deal with the situation at the school but he did not let the parents know. The white parents were not going to send their children back to school until the situation was resolved. Charles V. Koppenhaver, the principal, told black students that he would retire at the end of the next month and he would do so for them.

In 2003, based on reports of violence, Camden High School was identified as "persistently dangerous" by the New Jersey Department of Education, one of seven schools in the state (and one of two high schools) listed in an annual report required under the No Child Left Behind Act; under the terms of the federal act, families were notified and given the option to transfer to a different school.

In 2008, a cafeteria brawl led to the arrest of 18 students, a 14-year-old student was found with a gun loaded with hollow-point bullets, and the school principal was replaced.

=== Demolition ===
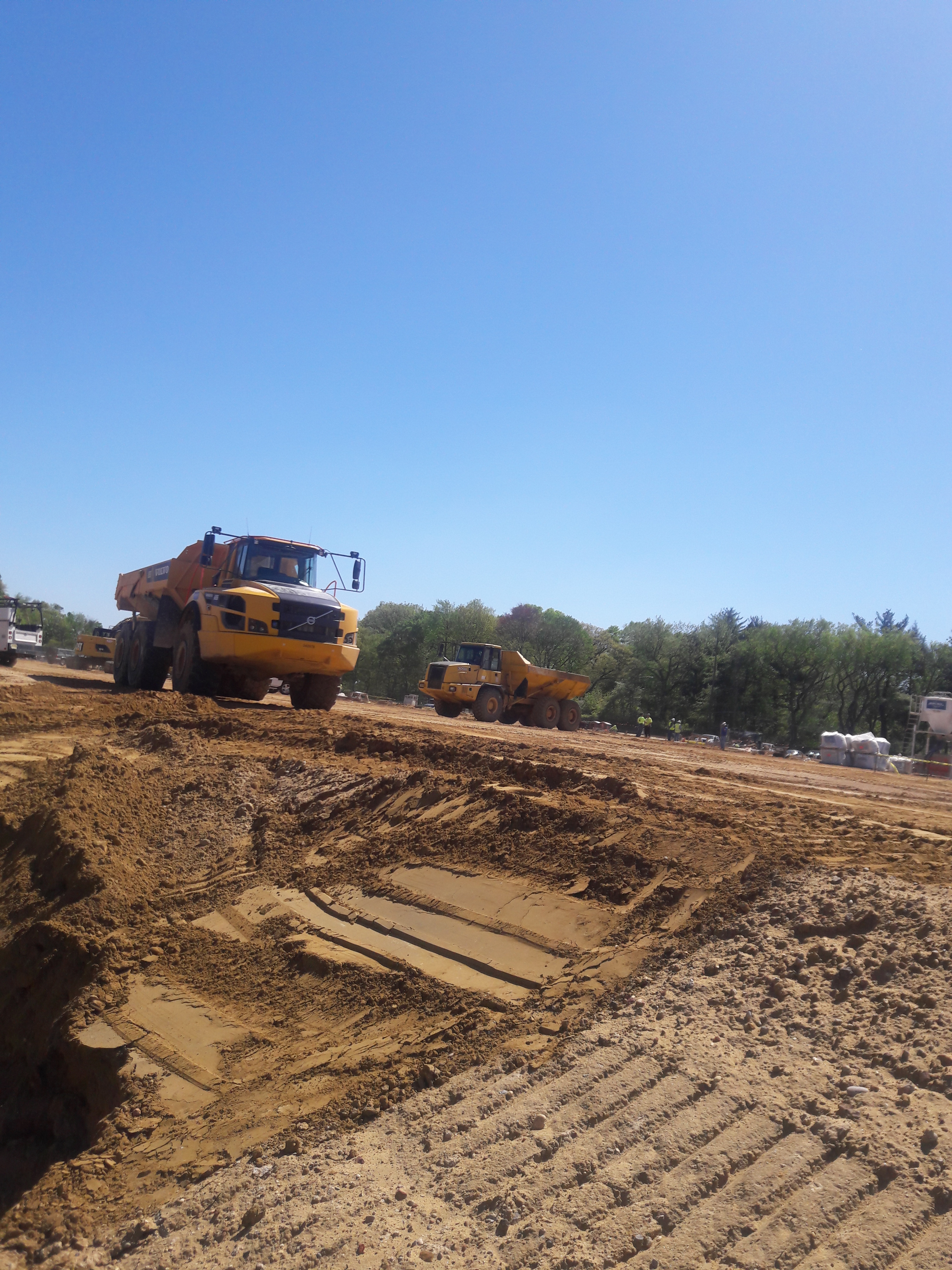
Construction work on Camden High School after the demolition

In 2008, Governor of New Jersey Jon Corzine announced plans to renovate Camden High School at an estimated cost of $100 million for renovation. In 2011, Chris Christie cancelled the project after deciding that it was not the best way to solve the problems of the school. This ultimately led to the decision to demolish and rebuild the high school because it was much more economical to rebuild a new school than to renovate the old school. On November 27, 2017, an attempt to demolish Camden High School by the school's parent association was denied by Judge Nan S. Famular. It was denied because superintendent Paymon Rouhanifard and the city's school board, as defendants, argued that it was a violation of the New Jersey Register of Historic Places Act to destroy the high school. Mo'Neke Ragsdale, a member of the Camden High PTA, believed that putting resources towards saving the school was not worth the effort but still wanted to save the school. The final decision was ruled by a state Superior Court judge allowing the demolition of the high school. The school was demolished after the end of the 2016/2017 school year.

The parts of the school that were to be demolished were the ones that were built before 1917. They would be replaced with a $133 million budget for academic buildings that would be considered state-of-the-art. Alumni of Camden High School and the group "Stop the Demolition of Camden High," led by Mo'Neke Ragsdale, fought to preserve the old Camden High School building. They sought to add Camden High School to the National Register of Historic Places. They wanted the construction to be on the back of the school because they had over 18 acres of land.

=== Construction ===
As part of a $132.6 million construction project begun at the start of the 2017–18 school year at Camden High School by the New Jersey Schools Development Authority, the school's 500 students were shifted to the Hatch Middle School building. The new 242,000-square-foot (22,500 m^{2}) building will be completed for the 2021–22 school year and be able to accommodate 1,200 students when it reopens.

As of 2019, the construction of the new Camden High School building is expected to be finished by 2021. Current students are temporarily using Cooper B. Hatch Middle school for their classes while construction continues.

== Awards, recognition and rankings ==
The school was the 339th-ranked public high school in New Jersey out of 339 schools statewide in New Jersey Monthly magazine's September 2014 cover story on the state's "Top Public High Schools", using a new ranking methodology. The school had been ranked 287th in the state of 328 schools in 2012, after being ranked 322nd and lowest in 2010 out of 322 schools listed. The magazine ranked the school 316th in 2008 as the lowest out of 316 schools. The school was ranked 314th in the magazine's September 2006 issue, which surveyed 316 schools across the state.

== Performance and building condition ==
A report issued in 2014 indicated that in the city of 80,000, only three high school students posted SAT scores deemed "college ready."

== Athletics ==
The Camden High School Panthers compete in the Olympic Conference, an athletic conference consisting of public and private high schools located in Burlington County, Camden County and Gloucester County. The Olympic Conference operates under the supervision of the New Jersey State Interscholastic Athletic Association (NJSIAA). With 683 students in grades 10–12, the school was classified by the NJSIAA for the 2022–24 school years as Group II South for most athletic competition purposes. The football team competes in the Constitution Division of the 94-team West Jersey Football League superconference and was classified by the NJSIAA as Group II South for football for 2024–2026, which included schools with 514 to 685 students.

Previously, the athletic teams at Camden High School were called/known as the "Purple Avalanche," a fitting name for the large football teams (60 or more players) on the sideline at the start of their games in the 1960s and 1970s. As of 2009, Camden High had won over 41 South Jersey Championships, and appeared in over 20 state championship games, winning 11 of them.

The school and their crosstown rival, Woodrow Wilson High School, still play the traditional Thanksgiving Day football game each year. The Thanksgiving Day game in 1979 was suspended after rival gangs started shooting at each other, resulting in at least 14 injuries and dozens of arrests. The school has had a football rivalry since 1931 with Camden Catholic High School; Camden Catholic leads the series with an overall record of 35–29–2 through the 2017 season. NJ.com listed the rivalry as 28th on its 2017 list "Ranking the 31 fiercest rivalries in N.J. HS football"

The boys basketball team won the Group IV state championship in 1945 (vs. Union Hill High School in the final game of the tournament), 1959 (vs. Weequahic High School), 1960 (vs. Weequahic), 1978 (vs. Linden High School), 1979 (vs. Union Hill), 1982 (vs. Montclair High School), 1984 (vs. JFK of Paterson), 1986 (vs. Montclair), 1987 (vs. JFK of Paterson), and won the Group III title in 1974 (vs. Memorial of West New York) and 2000 (vs. Lawrence High School). The 11 group championships won by the program is tied for the fourth-most of any school in the state. The 1945 team won the Group IV title with a 46–38 win against Union Hill in the championship game played at the Elizabeth Armory. The boys' basketball team went undefeated in both 1959 and 1960, winning state championships each year. The team won the 1959 Group IV state title with a 94-73 win against Weequahic in the championship game. A crowd of 5,000 at the Camden Convention Hall watched the 1960 team win the Group IV title with a 64–49 victory against Weequahic in the finals to extended the team's unbeaten streak to 47 games over two seasons. The team won a total of seven state championships in the 1970s and 1980s. USA Today ranked the 1986 team as number one nationwide. Curtis Walls, Lee Wall, Louis Banks, Sean Turner, Larry Cohen, Reggie Lawrence, Kevin Smith, Dennis Brown, Davis Nieves, and Vic Carstarphen all played on this team. The 2000 boys' basketball team won the South Jersey Group III state championship as the seventh-seeded team, with an 89–64 win against top seed Lakewood High School, as Dajuan Wagner topped all scorers with 43 points. Camden High went on to win the State Group III title against Malcolm X Shabazz High School. From there they moved on to the Tournament of Champions, which pits the six state group champions (four public school and two private school groups) against each other to determine one overall champion. Camden defeated Seton Hall Preparatory School by a score of 50–46 in the tournament final.

The boys track team won the Group IV spring / outdoor track state championship in 1975 and 1995–1997, and won the Group III title in 1998–2001, 2004 and 2005. The program's 10 state titles are tied for eighth in the state.

The 1976 football team finished the season with an 11–0 record after winning the NJSIAA South Jersey Group IV state sectional title with a 30–13 victory against Toms River High School South in the championship game.

The girls team won the NJSIAA spring track Group IV state championship in 1978 and 1979, won the Group III title in 2008, and won in Group II in 2009.

The girls track team won the indoor relay championship in Group III in 1994 and 2008. The boys team won the Group III title in 1997 and 1999, and won the Group II title in 2005

The boys track team won the indoor track championship in Group IV in 1996, in Group III in 1997, 2001, 2007 and 2008 (as co-champion) and won in Group II in 2005.

== Administration ==
The school's principal is James Thompson. His administration team includes two lead educators.

== Notable alumni ==
- Harold Amos (1918–2003), microbiologist who taught at Harvard Medical School for nearly fifty years
- Alfred L. Banyard (1908–1992), seventh bishop of the Episcopal Diocese of New Jersey, serving from 1955 to 1973
- Arthur Barclay (born 1982, class of 2000), politician who represented the 5th Legislative District in the New Jersey General Assembly from 2016 to 2018; Barclay was captain of the basketball team that won the 2000 Tournament of Champions
- Cindy Birdsong (born 1939), singer who replaced Florence Ballard in The Supremes
- Aaron Bradshaw (born 2003, class of 2023), basketball player
- Fran Brown (born 1982), current head football coach at Syracuse
- John Brown (born 1939) former American football tackle who played 10 seasons for two NFL teams
- Sean Chandler (born 1996), football safety for the New York Giants
- Duce Chestnut (born 2002, class of 2021), American football cornerback for the Syracuse Orange
- Joseph W. Cowgill (1908–1986, class of 1925), politician who served as the Minority Leader of the New Jersey Senate
- Mary Keating Croce (1928–2016, class of 1946), politician who served in the New Jersey General Assembly for three two-year terms, from 1974 to 1980, before serving as the Chairwoman of the New Jersey State Parole Board in the 1990s
- Angelo Errichetti (1928–2013), former mayor of Camden and New Jersey state senator
- Rasheer Fleming (born 2004, class of 2022), basketball player who attended Saint Joseph's and plays for the Phoenix Suns
- Margaret Giannini (1921–2021), physician, first director of National Institute on Disability, Independent Living, and Rehabilitation Research
- Sean Golden (born 1983, class of 2001), former artistic gymnast and member of the United States men's national artistic gymnastics team
- Brad Hawkins (born 1998, class of 2016), American football safety, who played for the New England Patriots of the National Football League
- George Hegamin (born 1973), former offensive lineman who played in the NFL for the Dallas Cowboys, Philadelphia Eagles and Tampa Bay Buccaneers
- Andy Hinson (1930–2025, class of 1949), retired American football head coach of the Bethune–Cookman University Wildcats football team from 1976 to 1978 and of the Cheyney University of Pennsylvania Wolves from 1979 to 1984, who coached at Camden HS in the 1970s
- Leon Huff (born 1942), part of the Gamble and Huff songwriting team for Philadelphia International Records
- Lee B. Laskin (1936–2024, class of 1954), attorney, politician and judge who served in both houses of the New Jersey Legislature before being appointed to serve on the New Jersey Superior Court
- Reggie Lawrence (born 1970), former NFL wide receiver who played for the Philadelphia Eagles in 1993
- Robert S. MacAlister (1897–1957), Los Angeles City Council member from 1934 to 1939
- Aaron McCargo Jr. (born 1971), television chef
- Thomas J. Osler (1940–2023, class of 1957), mathematician, former national champion distance runner and author
- Charles Payton (born 1960), former professional basketball player
- Jim Perry (1933–2015), former television host who was a basketball player in the early 1950s.
- Derrick Ramsey (born 1956), Kentucky Secretary of Education and Workforce Development and former NFL player who played tight end for nine seasons for the Oakland/Los Angeles Raiders, New England Patriots and Detroit Lions
- Dorcas Reilly (1926–2018), chef, homemaker and inventor, best known for popularizing the green bean casserole
- George Savitsky (1924–2012), offensive tackle who played in the National Football League for the Philadelphia Eagles
- Tasha Smith (born 1969), actress, director and producer who began her career in a starring role on the NBC comedy series Boston Common
- Walter Fifield Snyder (1912–1993), scholar of ancient history
- Art Still (born 1955), defensive end who played in the NFL for the Kansas City Chiefs and Buffalo Bills and was selected for the Pro Bowl four times
- Billy Thompson (born 1963, class of 1982), former small forward for the Miami Heat and Los Angeles Lakers
- Nick Virgilio (1928–1989), haiku poet
- Dajuan Wagner (born 1983, class of 2001), NBA basketball player and winner of the 2001 Naismith Prep Player of the Year Award
- D. J. Wagner (born 2005, class of 2023), college basketball player for the Arkansas Razorbacks
- Milt Wagner (born 1963, class of 1981), former point guard for the Miami Heat and Los Angeles Lakers, and father of DaJuan Wagner
- Bruce A. Wallace (1905–1977), politician who served in the New Jersey Senate from 1942 to 1944 and from 1948 to 1955
- Buster Williams (born 1942), jazz bassist
- Charles A. Wolverton (1880–1969, class of 1897), politician who represented New Jersey's 1st congressional district in the United States House of Representatives from 1927 to 1959
