= List of basketball teams in Canada =

Basketball teams in Canada include major and minor professional teams as well as university teams. They are organised by league or athletic association. This list includes both active and defunct teams.

== Major professional teams ==
=== National Basketball Association (NBA) ===
==== Active teams ====
Team	City	Established	NBA Championships	Notes	Ref.
Toronto Raptors	Toronto, Ontario	1995	1	2019 NBA Champions	

==== Defunct teams ====
Team	City	Existence	NBA Championships	Notes	Ref.
Vancouver Grizzlies	Vancouver, British Columbia	1995–2001	0	In 2001, the team relocated to Memphis, Tennessee, United States and was renamed the Memphis Grizzlies.	

=== Basketball Association of America ===
==== Defunct teams ====
Team	City	Existence	BAA Championships	Notes	Re.
Toronto Huskies	Toronto, Ontario	1946–47	0	Folded after 1946–47 season.	

== Minor professional teams ==
=== Active leagues ===
==== American Basketball Association ====
===== Defunct teams =====
Team	City	Existence	ABA Championships	Notes
ABV-Canadada Revolution	Toronto, Ontario	2011	0	Select team formed from merger of several teams, never played a game.
Calgary Drillers	Calgary, Alberta	2004–05	0	Folded during 2022–23 season.
Calgary Crush	Calgary, Alberta	2011–24	0	
Edmonton Cheetahs	Edmonton, Alberta	2005–06	0	
Grande Prairie Cowboys	Grande Prairie, Alberta	2013	0	Moved from Oakland County, Michigan following the 2012–13 season, never actually played any games in Grande Prairie though.
Halifax Rainmen	Halifax, Nova Scotia	2007–08	0	Left the league following the 2007–08 season and joined the Premier Basketball League.
Hamilton Rockstars	Hamilton, Ontario	2008	0	Folded in August 2008, before ever playing a game.
	Hamilton, Ontario	2011	0	Announced as a member of ABA-Canada, but the ABA-Canada was reduced to a single "selects" team.
	Mississauga, Ontario	2011	0	Originally announced as an expansion team, but was quietly removed from the league's website.
Montreal Matrix	Montreal, Quebec	2005–08	0	
Niagara Daredevils	St. Catharines, Ontario but was later moved to London Ontario for the 24–25 season and so on	2005–06	0	Folded during 2005–06 season.
Ontario Red Wolves	Mississauga, Ontario	2005–08	0	
	Oshawa, Ontario	2011	0	Announced as a member of ABA-Canada, but the ABA-Canada was reduced to a single "selects" team.
	Ottawa, Ontario	2011	0	Announced as a member of ABA-Canada, but the ABA-Canada was reduced to a single "selects" team.
Quebec Kebs	Quebec City, Quebec	2006–07	0	Left the league following the 2007–08 season and joined the Premier Basketball League.
	Thunder Bay, Ontario	2011	0	Originally announced as an expansion team, but was quietly removed from the league's website.
Vancouver Balloholics	Vancouver, British Columbia	2014–16	0	
Vancouver Explorers	Vancouver, British Columbia	2004–06	0	

==== Canadian Elite Basketball League ====
===== Active teams =====
Team	City	Established	CEBL Championships	Notes
Calgary Surge	Calgary, Alberta	2023	0	Relocated from Guelph, where they were known as the Guelph Nighthawks.
Edmonton Stingers	Edmonton, Alberta	2019	2	
Vancouver Bandits	Langley, British Columbia	2019	0	
Brampton Honey Badgers	Brampton, Ontario	2019	0	
Ottawa Blackjacks	Ottawa, Ontario	2020	0	
Niagara River Lions	St. Catharines, Ontario	2019	2	Moved from the National Basketball League of Canada following the 2017-18 season.
Saskatoon Mamba	Saskatoon, Saskatchewan	2019	1	
Winnipeg Sea Bears	Winnipeg, Manitoba	2022	1	
Montreal Alliance	Montreal, Quebec	2022	0	

==== National Basketball League of Canada ====
===== Active teams =====
Team	City	Established	NBL Championships	Notes
KW Titans	Kitchener, Ontario	2016	0	
London Lightning	London, Ontario	2011	4	2012, 2013, 2017, and 2018 champions
Sudbury Five	Sudbury, Ontario	2018	0	
Windsor Express	Windsor, Ontario	2012	2	

===== Defunct teams =====
Team	City	Existed	NBL Championships	Notes
Cape Breton Highlanders	Sydney, Nova Scotia	2016–2019	0	
Halifax Rainmen	Halifax, Nova Scotia	2011–2015	0	Left the Premier Basketball League following the 2010–11 season. Filed for bankruptcy after the 2014–15 season in part of the 2015 NBL Canada Finals brawl
Montreal Jazz	Montreal, Quebec	2012–2013	0	
Mississauga Power	Mississauga, Ontario	2011–2015	0	Displaced by the Raptors 905 of the NBA G League.
Moncton Miracles	Moncton, New Brunswick	2011–2017	0	Replaced by the Moncton Magic
Niagara River Lions	St. Catharines, Ontario	2015–2018	0	Joined the Canadian Elite Basketball League following the 2017–18 season.
Orangeville A's	Orangeville, Ontario	2013–2017	0	Joined NBL Canada in 2013–14 as the Brampton A's before relocating in 2015.
Ottawa SkyHawks	Ottawa, Ontario	2013–2014	0	Failed to repay loans after one season and were removed from the league.
Quebec Kebs	Quebec City, Quebec	2011–2012	0	Left the Premier Basketball League following the 2010–11 season and folded following the 2011–12 season.

==== NBA G League ====
===== Active teams =====
Team	City	Established	G League Championships	Notes
Raptors 905	Mississauga, Ontario	2015	1	Owned and operated by the parent company of the Toronto Raptors.

=== Defunct leagues ===
==== Continental Basketball Association ====
Team	City	Existence	CBA Championships	Notes
Alberta Dusters	Lethbridge, Alberta	1980–82	0	Moved to Las Vegas after 1981–82 season.
Saskatchewan Hawks	Saskatoon, Saskatchewan	2001–02	0	Folded after the 2001–02 season.
Toronto Tornados	Toronto, Ontario	1983–86	0	Moved to Pensacola, Florida during the 1985–86 season.
Vancouver Dragons	Vancouver, British Columbia	2007–09	0	Was granted an expansion franchise in 2007. But a press release from the team stated they wished to begin play in 2010–11, to avoid conflicting with the Winter Olympics. However, the league folded after the 2008–09 season preventing their launch.

==== International Basketball Association ====
Team	City	Existence	IBA Championships	Notes
Saskatchewan Hawks	Saskatoon, Saskatchewan	2000–2001	0	Moved from Mansfield, Ohio during the 1999–2000 season. League merged with Continental Basketball Association after the 2000–01 season.
Winnipeg Cyclone	Winnipeg, Manitoba	1995–2001	0	League merged with Continental Basketball Association after the 2000-01 season.

==== International Basketball League ====
Team	City	Existed	IBL Championships	Notes
BC Titans	Langley, British Columbia	2009–10	0	
Edmonton Chill	Edmonton, Alberta	2008	0	Changed name from Sled Dawgz to Chill on October 23, 2007.
Edmonton Energy	Edmonton, Alberta	2009–12	0	

==== National Basketball League (1993–94) ====
Team	City	Existence	NBL Championships	Notes
Calgary Outlaws	Calgary, Alberta	1994	0	League folded during 1994 season.
Cape Breton Breakers	Sydney, Nova Scotia	1993–94	0	League folded during 1994 season.
Edmonton Skyhawks	Edmonton, Alberta	1993–94	0	Moved from Hamilton to Edmonton prior to 1993 playoffs. League folded during 1994 season.
Halifax Windjammers	Halifax, Nova Scotia	1993–94	0	League folded during 1994 season.
Montreal Dragons	Montreal, Quebec	1993	0	Folded during 1993 season.
Saskatoon Slam	Saskatoon, Saskatchewan	1993–94	1	League folded during 1994 season.
Winnipeg Thunder	Winnipeg, Manitoba	1993–94	0	League folded during 1994 season.

==== Ontario Professional Basketball Association ====
Team	City	Existence	Notes
Barrie Bandits	Barrie, Ontario	2004	League folded during 2004 season.
Brantford Connexion	Brantford, Ontario	2004	League folded during 2004 season.
Guelph Gladiators	Guelph, Ontario	2004	League folded during 2004 season.
London Orion	London, Ontario	2004	League folded during 2004 season.
Niagara Gamblers	Welland, Ontario	2004	League folded during 2004 season.
Waterloo Revolution	Waterloo, Ontario	2004	League folded during 2004 season.
Windsor Drive	Windsor, Ontario	2004	League folded during 2004 season.

==== Pacific Coast Professional Basketball League ====
Team	City	Existence	PCPBL Championships	Notes
Vancouver Hornets	Vancouver, British Columbia	1946–48	0	League folded after the 1947–48 season.

==== Premier Basketball League ====
Team	City	Existed	PBL Championships	Notes
Halifax Rainmen	Halifax, Nova Scotia	2008–11	0	Left the American Basketball Association following the 2007–08 season. Left the PBL following the 2010–11 season and formed the National Basketball League of Canada.
Montreal Sasquatch	Montreal, Quebec	2008	0	Granted an expansion team for the 2008 season, but folded during their inaugural season.
Quebec Kebs	Quebec City, Quebec	2008–11	0	Left the American Basketball Association following the 2007–08 season. Left the PBL following the 2010–11 season and formed the National Basketball League of Canada.
Saint John Mill Rats	Saint John, New Brunswick	2010–11	0	Moved from Manchester, New Hampshire, following the 2009–10 season. Left the PBL following the 2010–11 season and formed the National Basketball League of Canada.
Toronto Lazers	Toronto, Ontario	2008	0	Granted an expansion team for the 2008 season, but were subsequently removed from the league without any mention, prior to the 2008 season.

==== World Basketball League ====
Team	City	Existence	WBL Championships	Notes
Calgary 88's	Calgary, Alberta	1988–92	0	League folded during 1992 season.
Halifax Windjammers	Halifax, Nova Scotia	1991–92	0	League folded during 1992 season.
Hamilton Skyhawks	Hamilton, Ontario	1992	0	League folded during 1992 season.
Saskatchewan Storm	Saskatoon, Saskatchewan	1990–92	0	League folded during 1992 season.
Vancouver Nighthawks	Vancouver, British Columbia	1988	0	Folded after 1988 season.
Winnipeg Thunder	Winnipeg, Manitoba	1992	0	League folded during 1992 season.

== University teams ==
=== U Sports ===
==== Active teams ====
===== Atlantic University Sport =====
Team	City	Established	Men's Championships	Women's Championships	Notes
Acadia University Axemen/Axewomen	Wolfville, Nova Scotia		3	0	
Cape Breton University Capers	Sydney, Nova Scotia		0	0	
Dalhousie University Tigers	Halifax, Nova Scotia		0	0	
Memorial University of Newfoundland Sea-Hawks	St. John's, Newfoundland		0	0	
University of New Brunswick Varsity Reds	Fredericton, New Brunswick		0	0	
University of Prince Edward Island Panthers	Charlottetown, Prince Edward Island		0	0	
St. Francis Xavier University X-Men/X-Women	Antigonish, Nova Scotia		3	0	
Saint Mary's University Huskies	Halifax, Nova Scotia		4	0	

===== Canada West Universities Athletic Association =====
Team	City	Established	Men's Championships	Women's Championships	Notes
University of Alberta Golden Bears/Pandas	Edmonton, Alberta	1910	3	1	The men's teams use the nickname Golden Bears, while the women's teams use the nickname Pandas.
Brandon University Bobcats	Brandon, Manitoba		4	0	
University of British Columbia Thunderbirds	Vancouver, British Columbia	1924	2	6	
University of British Columbia Okanagan Heat	Kelowna, British Columbia	2011	0	0	
University of Calgary Dinos	Calgary, Alberta	1964	0	1	Changed its name from Dinosaurs to Dinos in 1999
University of the Fraser Valley Cascades	Abbotsford, British Columbia		0	0	
University of Lethbridge Pronghorns	Lethbridge, Alberta		0	0	
University of Manitoba Bisons	Winnipeg, Manitoba	1927	1	3	
University of Regina Cougars	Regina, Saskatchewan		0	1	
University of Saskatchewan Huskies	Saskatoon, Saskatchewan	1912	1	0	
Thompson Rivers University WolfPack	Kamloops, British Columbia	2005	0	0	
University of Victoria Vikes	Victoria, British Columbia		8	9	
University of Winnipeg Wesmen	Winnipeg, Manitoba		0	3	

===== Ontario University Athletics =====
Team	City	Established	Men's Championships	Women's Championships	Notes
Brock University Badgers	St. Catharines, Ontario		2	0	
Carleton University Ravens	Ottawa, Ontario		15	1	
University of Guelph Gryphons	Guelph, Ontario	1968	1	0	
Lakehead University Thunderwolves	Thunder Bay, Ontario		0	0	
Laurentian University Voyageurs/Lady Vees	Sudbury, Ontario		0	7	
McMaster University Marauders	Hamilton, Ontario	1898	0	0	
University of Ottawa Gee-Gees	Ottawa, Ontario	1905	0	0	
Queen's University Golden Gaels	Kingston, Ontario	1898	0	0	
Royal Military College of Canada Paladins	Kingston, Ontario		0	0	
Ryerson University Rams	Toronto, Ontario		0	0	
University of Toronto Varsity Blues	Toronto, Ontario	1877	0	1	
University of Waterloo Warriors	Waterloo, Ontario	1957	1	0	
Western University Mustangs	London, Ontario	1929	0	0	The institution is formally The University of Western Ontario, but has branded itself as Western University since 2012.
Wilfrid Laurier University Golden Hawks	Waterloo, Ontario	1961	1	0	Changed its name from Waterloo Lutheran University in 1960.
University of Windsor Lancers	Windsor, Ontario	1968	0	0	
York University Lions	Toronto, Ontario	1968	0	0	Changed its nickname from Yeomen to Lions in 2003.

===== Réseau du sport étudiant du Québec =====
Team	City	Established	Men's Championships	Women's Championships	Notes
Bishop's University Gaiters	Lennoxville, Quebec	1873	1	2	
Concordia University Stingers	Montreal, Quebec	1974	1	0	Became Concordia University in 1974 with the merger of Sir George Williams University and Loyola College.
Université Laval Rouge et Or	Quebec City, Quebec		0	0	
McGill University Redbirds/Martlets	Montreal, Quebec	1874	0	0	The men's nickname of Redmen, first used in 1927, was dropped after the 2018–19 season; men's teams went a year without a nickname until Redbirds was adopted starting in 2020–21. For a time in the 1960s, when men's teams were alternatively known as Indians, women's teams were formally nicknamed Super Squaws, but that was abandoned in the late 1960s in favor of the current women's nickname of Martlets.
Université du Québec à Montréal Citadins	Montreal, Quebec		0	0	

==== Defunct teams ====
Team	City	Existed	Men's Championships	Women's Championships	Notes
Assumption University	Windsor, Ontario		1	0	
Simon Fraser University Clan	Burnaby, British Columbia	2002–2010	0	3	Joined U Sports (known from 2001–2016 as CIS) in 2001, after playing National Association of Intercollegiate Athletics (NAIA) basketball previously. Left CIS in 2010 for the NCAA.

=== National Association of Intercollegiate Athletics ===
==== Defunct teams ====
Team	City	Existence	Men's Championships	Women's Championships	Notes
Simon Fraser University Clan	Burnaby, British Columbia	1965–2002	0	0	Left the NAIA to join CIS in 2002.

=== National Collegiate Athletic Association ===
==== Active team ====
===== Great Northwest Athletic Conference =====
Team	City	Established	Men's Championships	Women's Championships	Notes
Simon Fraser University Clan	Burnaby, British Columbia	1965	0	0	
