= Basketball in Canada =

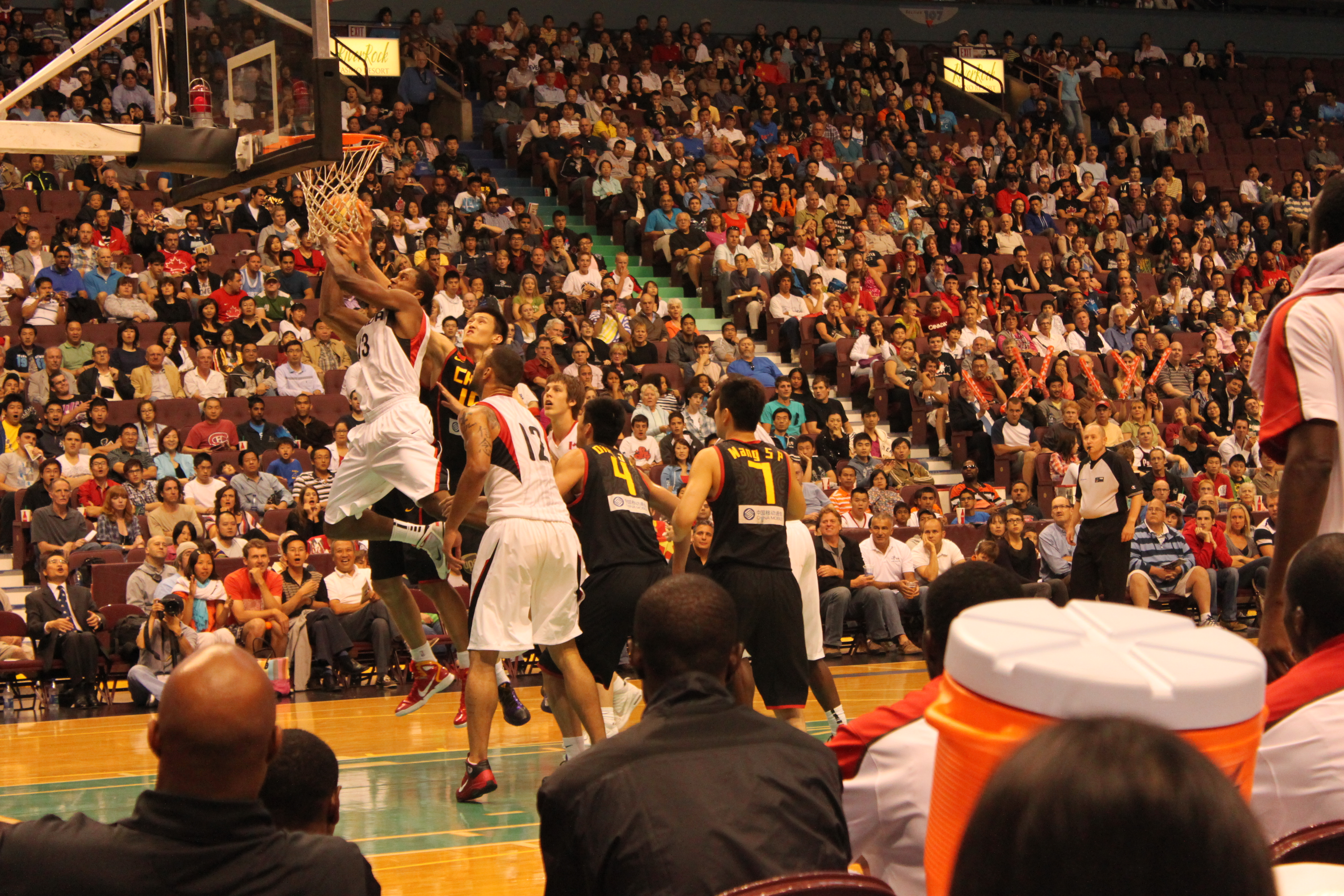
- The Canadian national basketball team playing an exhibition game against China
- Country: Canada
- Governing body: Canada Basketball
- National teams: Men's national team; Women's national team

National competitions
- FIBA Basketball World Cup; FIBA Women's Basketball World Cup; Summer Olympics

Club competitions
- Canada: Canadian Elite Basketball League; National Basketball League of Canada; United States: National Basketball Association (1 club); NBA G League (1 club)

Basketball in Canada dates back to the 20th century. Basketball is played year-round by men and women and various levels of competition. Several professional basketball leagues have teams based in Canada.

== History ==
James Naismith, a Canadian born in Almonte, Ontario, who moved to the United States, invented basketball in Springfield, Massachusetts in the 1890s. This new sport soon became popular as an indoor sport that needed a minimal equipment, gaining popularity at high schools and colleges in Canada.

The Toronto Huskies were co-founders of the Basketball Association of America, a forerunner of the NBA, but disbanded after the first season.

In Canada, the sport has long lived in the shadow of ice hockey, but in the early 21st century the sport saw a rise in popularity, partly due to the Toronto Raptors, an expansion National Basketball Association (NBA) franchise established in 1995. The Vancouver Grizzlies was another NBA expansion franchise that was based in Vancouver, British Columbia from 1995 to 2001, when it was relocated to Memphis, Tennessee.

The National Basketball League was played for one and a half seasons in 1993 and 1994.

In 2011, a new domestic league was formed, the National Basketball League of Canada (NBL Canada). The league was the first fully domestic professional basketball league to operate in Canada since the National Basketball League, which operated from 1993 to 1994. The NBLC would have 10 teams across Eastern Canada at its peak. The Covid-19 Pandemic would have disastrous consequences for the league which would fall to only 4 teams, all located in Ontario. The league folded in 2023 with the remaining teams joining the Basketball Super League (North America).

The Canadian Elite Basketball League (CEBL) is a professional tier 1 basketball league which began play in 2019 season. It is the highest ranked domestic league as recognized by Basketball Canada As of 2025 the CEBL has 10 teams in 6 provinces across Canada.

The Toronto Raptors won their first NBA championship in 2019, the first champion outside of the United States.

== Collegiate basketball ==
Students in Canada may participate in varsity basketball teams in colleges and universities throughout Canada. U Sports is the national sports governing body for university sports in Canada, whereas the Canadian Colleges Athletic Association is the national governing body for colleges. The winners of U Sports' annual men's basketball championship are awarded the W. P. McGee Trophy, whereas the winners of the women's annual basketball championship are awarded the Bronze Baby trophy. Growing numbers of Canadian men and women play college basketball in the United States' National Collegiate Athletic Association.

== Professional basketball ==
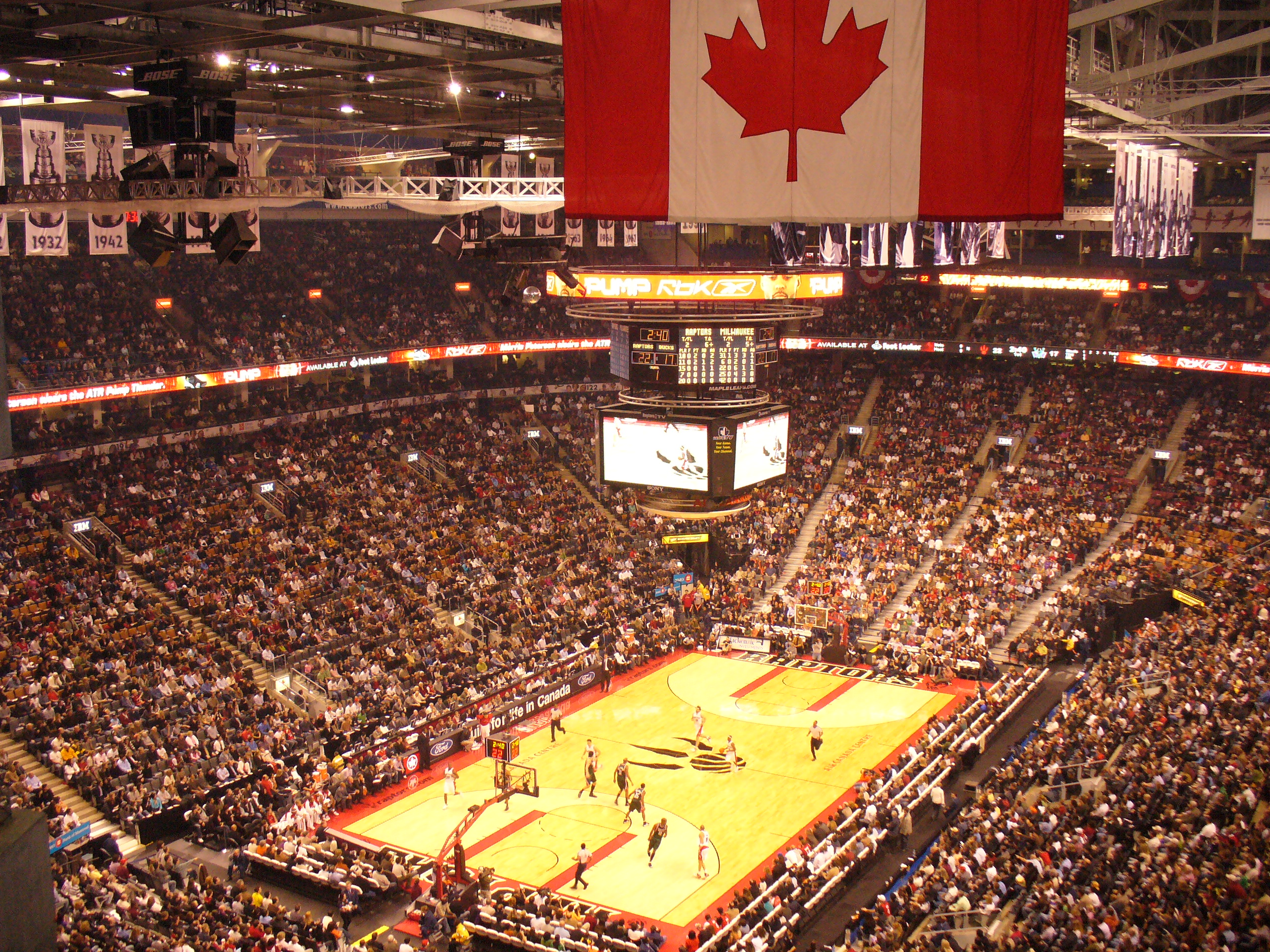
The Toronto Raptors play the Milwaukee Bucks at Scotiabank Arena. The Raptors is the National Basketball Association's only team based in Canada.

Presently, only one team in the NBA is based in Canada, the Toronto Raptors. The Raptors also operate a minor league professional team, the Raptors 905 of the NBA G League. Both Raptors franchises are based in the Greater Toronto Area. In addition to the NBA, there are three other professional men's basketball leagues which have teams based in Canada, the Canadian Elite Basketball League, the Basketball Super League and The Basketball League.

A number of Canadians have played in the NBA. The most prominent player is Steve Nash, two-time NBA Most Valuable Player and two-time FIBA AmeriCup Most Valuable Player. Other NBA players includ Chris Boucher, Andrew Wiggins, Brandon Clarke, Chris Duarte, Cory Joseph, Dalano Banton, Dillon Brooks, Dwight Powell, Ignas Brazdeikis, Jamal Murray, Joshua Primo, Kelly Olynyk, Khem Birch, Lindell Wigginton, Luguentz Dort, Oshae Brissett, Nickeil Alexander-Walker, Nik Stauskas, RJ Barrett, Shai Gilgeous-Alexander, Trey Lyles, and Tristan Thompson.

The Toronto Tempo joined the Women's National Basketball Association for the 2026 season, with its roster including Kayla Alexander and Kia Nurse. The other active players are Laeticia Amihere, Bridget Carleton, Aaliyah Edwards and Cassandre Prosper. Notable former players include Natalie Achonwa, Adut Bulgak, Stacey Dales and Tammy Sutton-Brown.

Canadian collegiate athletes playing basketball may choose to play professionally overseas after university or college.

Bob Houbregs and Steve Nash were elected to the Naismith Basketball Hall of Fame in 1987 and 2018.

== National competition ==
Canada has competed in a number of international competitions contested by national teams, most notably the Summer Olympics, and tournaments organized by FIBA, including the Basketball World Cup, and the Women's Basketball World Cup.

The Canadian men's national basketball team has made nine appearances at the Summer Olympic basketball tournament, winning silver at the 1936 Summer Olympics. The men's national team has also made 13 appearances to the FIBA World Cup. The Canadian women's national basketball team have made six appearances to the Summer Olympics, and 10 to the Women's World Cup. The women's national team won bronze in the 1979 and 1986 Women's World Cup tournaments.

In addition to the national team, Canada Basketball also manages a number of youth teams, including the women's under-17, men's under-17, women's under-19, and the men's under-19 teams.

== See also ==
- Naismith Cup
- List of basketball teams in Canada
