= Kenny Natt =

American basketball player and coach

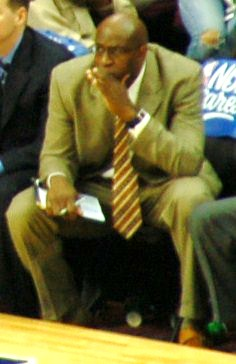
- Natt as an assistant coach for the Cleveland Cavaliers in 2006

Personal information
- Born: October 5, 1958 (age 68) Monroe, Louisiana, U.S.
- Listed height: 6 ft 3 in (1.91 m)
- Listed weight: 185 lb (84 kg)

Career information
- High school: Bastrop (Bastrop, Louisiana)
- College: Louisiana–Monroe (1976–1980)
- NBA draft: 1980: 2nd round, 30th overall pick
- Drafted by: Indiana Pacers
- Playing career: 1980–1989
- Position: Shooting guard
- Number: 3, 18, 2
- Coaching career: 1994–2012

Career history

Playing
- 1980: Indiana Pacers
- 1981–1982: Alberta Dusters
- 1983: Utah Jazz
- 1983–1984: Las Vegas/Albuquerque Silvers
- 1984: Lancaster Lightning
- 1984: Utah Jazz
- 1984: Kansas City Kings
- 1985–1987: Albany Patroons
- 1987–1988: Wyoming Wildcatters
- 1988: Fresno Flames
- 1988–1989: Rockford Lightning
- 1989: Youngstown Pride

Coaching
- 1992–1993: Columbus Horizon (assistant)
- 1994–1995: Youngstown State (assistant)
- 1996–2004: Utah Jazz (assistant)
- 2004–2007: Cleveland Cavaliers (assistant)
- 2007–2008: Sacramento Kings (assistant)
- 2008–2009: Sacramento Kings (interim)
- 2011–2012: India

Career highlights
- All-CBA First Team (1982); All-CBA Second Team (1987)
- Stats at NBA.com
- Stats at Basketball Reference

Kenneth Wayne Natt (born October 5, 1958) is an American former professional basketball player and ex-interim head coach for the National Basketball Association's Sacramento Kings. He was a 6'3" 185 lb (84 kg) guard and played collegiately at Northeast Louisiana University (now the University of Louisiana-Monroe) and had a three-year NBA playing career. After serving as an assistant with the Cleveland Cavaliers from 2004 to 2007, Natt was named to the coaching staff of newly appointed Kings head coach and former Kansas City Kings teammate Reggie Theus in 2007. He was subsequently named interim head coach on the firing of Theus, but he himself was fired on April 24, 2009, after the Kings finished with an NBA season-low 17 wins.

== Professional playing career ==
Natt was selected with the 7th pick of the second round (30th overall) in the 1980 NBA draft by the Indiana Pacers. He played for three different teams until the 1984–85 season.

Outside of his NBA career, he played for seven total teams in the Continental Basketball Association (CBA) and the World Basketball League (WBL). He was selected to the All-CBA First Team in 1982 and Second Team in 1987.

== Coaching career ==
Natt began his coaching career in 1994 as an assistant coach at Youngstown State University. Natt then worked as a scout for the Utah Jazz for one season under Jerry Sloan before being an assistant on Sloan's staff from 1996 to 2004. After that, Natt joined the Cleveland Cavaliers' coaching staff in 2004. He has also coached in the CBA and the Canadian NBL with the Cape Breton Breakers, and worked as an assistant coach at Youngstown State University and as a player scout for the Jazz and for the WBL. In 2011, he became the head coach of the India national basketball team. Since 2012, Natt has been director of basketball at the IMG Academy.

In 2003, Kenny Natt was inducted into the University of Louisiana at Monroe (ULM) Hall of Fame. He is the younger brother of former NBA All-Star Calvin Natt.

== Career playing statistics ==
Legend
GP	Games played	GS	Games started	MPG	Minutes per game
FG%	Field goal percentage	3P%	3-point field goal percentage	FT%	Free throw percentage
RPG	Rebounds per game	APG	Assists per game	SPG	Steals per game
BPG	Blocks per game	PPG	Points per game	**Bold**	Career high

=== NBA ===
==== Regular season ====
Year	Team	GP	GS	MPG	FG%	3P%	FT%	RPG	APG	SPG	BPG	PPG
1980–81	Indiana	19	0	7.8	.325	**.250**	.636	.8	.5	**.3**	**.1**	3.1
1982–83	Utah	**22**	0	**9.5**	**.521**	.000	**.643**	**1.0**	**1.3**	.2	.0	**3.9**
1984–85	Utah	4	0	3.3	.400	–	.500	.5	.0	**.3**	.0	1.5
1984–85	Kansas City	4	0	4.0	.000	–	–	.3	.8	**.3**	.0	.0
Career		49	0	7.9	.417	.200	.621	.8	.8	.2	.0	3.1

== Head coaching record ==
Legend
Regular season	G	Games coached	W	Games won	L	Games lost	W–L %	Win–loss %
Playoffs	PG	Playoff games	PW	Playoff wins	PL	Playoff losses	PW–L %	Playoff win–loss %

Team	Year	G	W	L	W–L%	Finish	PG	PW	PL	PW–L%	Result
Sacramento	2008–09	58	11	47	.190	5th in Pacific	—	—	—	—	—
**Career**		58	11	47	.190		—	—	—	—	
