= Dayton Wings =

Dayton Wings may refer to:

- Dayton Ducks, a minor league baseball team, briefly known as the Dayton Wings from 1939 to 1940
- Dayton Wings (basketball team), a professional basketball franchise based in Dayton, Ohio
