= Calgary Outlaws =

Calgary Outlaws may refer to:

- Calgary Outlaws (baseball)
- Calgary Outlaws (basketball)
