= Winnipeg Thunder =

- Leagues: World Basketball League (1992); North American Basketball Association (1992 Playoff series); National Basketball League (1993–1994)
- Founded: 1992
- History: Winnipeg Thunder; 1992–1994
- Arena: Winnipeg Arena
- Capacity: 12,393
- Location: Winnipeg, Manitoba
- Team colours: Black, teal, white, silver
- General manager: Sam Katz
- Head coach: Tom Nissalke
- Ownership: Sam Katz (Majority) John Loewen, Jack Lewis, Vic Pruden, Hersh Wolch, David Asper (Minority)
- Championships: 0
- Division titles: 0

The Winnipeg Thunder was a professional basketball franchise based in Winnipeg, Manitoba, from 1992 to 1994. The Thunder played its inaugural season in the World Basketball League, which folded before the schedule ended. The club then joined the nascent National Basketball League, where it played for the 1993 and 1994 seasons.

The Thunder enjoyed considerable public and corporate support at the outset, which later dwindled due in part to league instability and increased competition in the local minor-league sports market, following the establishment of the Winnipeg Goldeyes baseball club. The club's financial backers included Sam Katz, John Loewen, Vic Pruden, Hersh Wolch and David Asper.

The Thunder played its home games at the Winnipeg Arena. It would eventually be succeeded by the Winnipeg Cyclone, which represented the city in the International Basketball Association from 1995 to 2001.

== History ==
It was announced by the World Basketball League on January 22, 1992 that Winnipeg was granted an expansion franchise in the league, and that the team name would be picked through a “Name-the-team” contest in the Winnipeg Free Press.

On February 14, 1992 team ownership unveiled the team name will be the Winnipeg Thunder after over 8,000 entries were submitted for the name-the-team contest.

The team named Tom Nissalke as the first head coach in franchise history on February 28, 1992.

The Thunder lost their first game in franchise history, May 1, 1992 on the road 127–103 to the Florida Jades.

The team played their first home game on May 11, 1992 at the Winnipeg Arena before a World Basketball League record breaking 11,052 fans, unfortunately the Thunder lost 101–84 to the defending champion Dayton Wings.

On May 15, 1992 after going 0–6 to start the season the Thunder won their first game in franchise history at home 127–103 over their Provincial rivals the Saskatchewan storm in front of 4,641 fans.

== Team information ==
=== Mascots ===
The Thunder's mascots were Kaboom and Baby Boom.

Cheerleaders

The team had a cheer team called the High Voltage Dance Team.

== Personnel ==
Head Coaches

- Tom Nissalke
- Mike Sylvester

Assistant Coaches

- Vic Pruden

== Season by season record ==
WBL

Season	GP	W	L	Pct.	GBL	Finish	Playoffs
1992	37	15	22	.405	13	6th WBL	No playoffs due to league disbanding on August 1, 1992
Totals	37	15	22	.405	–	–	–

NBL

Season	GP	W	L	Pct.	GBL	Finish	Playoffs
1993	46	29	17	.630	1	2nd NBL	Lost 3-2 in the NBL Semifinals to the Saskatoon Slam
1994	25	10	15	.400	7	6th NBL	League disbanded mid season July 9, 1994
Totals	71	39	32	.549	–	–	Playoff record 2–3
