= TD Coliseum =

Arena in Hamilton, Ontario

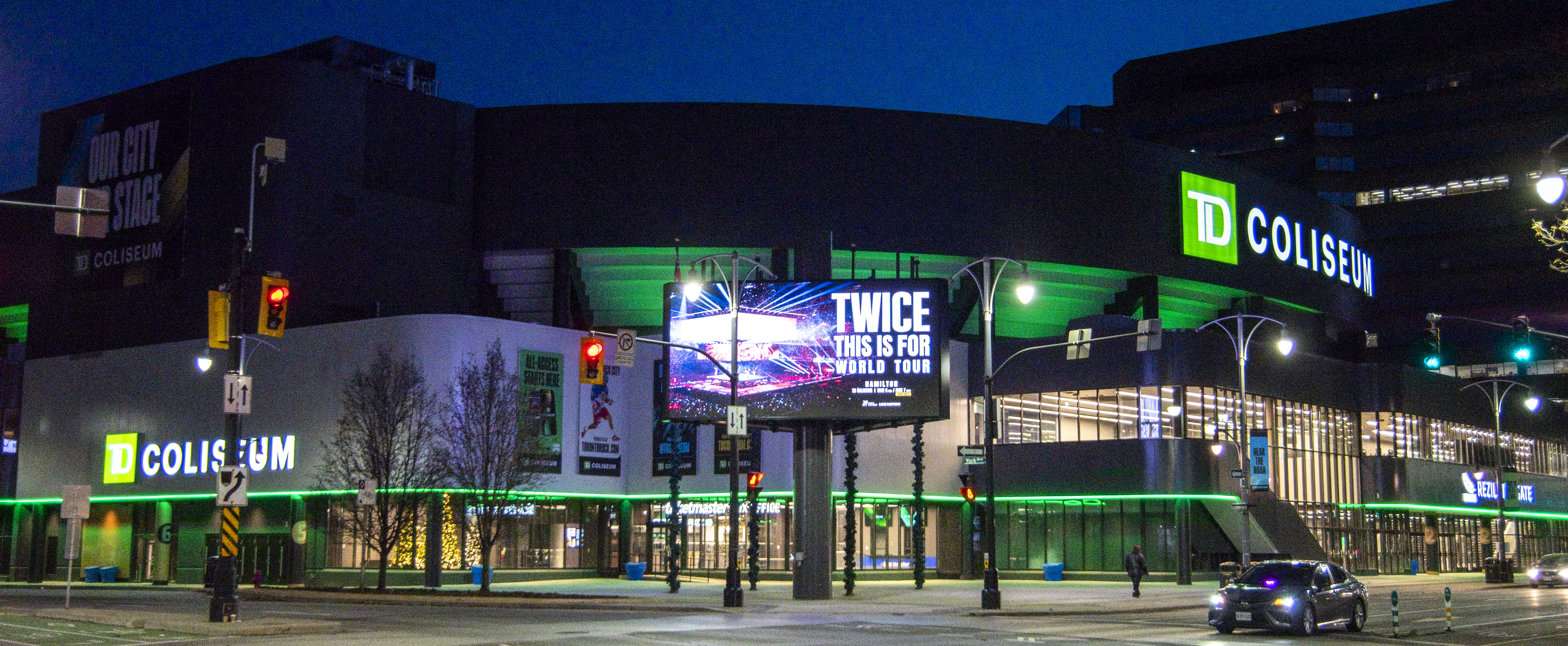
- TD Coliseum in December 2025

- Location within Ontario Location within Canada
- Former names: Copps Coliseum (1985–2014); FirstOntario Centre (2014–2024); Hamilton Arena (2024–2025)
- Address: 101 York Boulevard
- Location: Hamilton, Ontario, Canada
- Coordinates: 43°15′33″N 79°52′21″W
- Owner: City of Hamilton
- Operator: Core Entertainment (HUPEG and Oak View Group)
- Capacity: Hockey: 16,386; Basketball: 16,846; Concerts: 18,000
- Surface: Multi-surface
- Field size: 200 x 85 feet (expandable to 200 x 100)

Construction
- Groundbreaking: July 8, 1983
- Built: 1983–1985
- Opened: November 30, 1985
- Renovated: 2024–2025
- Cost: C$42.7 million ($111 million in 2025 dollars) $300M (renovation)
- Architects: Parkin Partnership; Sink Combs Dethlefs
- Project manager: Pigott Construction
- Structural engineers: John A. Martin & Associates
- General contractor: Pigott Construction

Tenants
- Hamilton Steelhawks (OHL) 1985–1988; Dukes of Hamilton (OHL) 1989–1991; Hamilton Skyhawks (WBL/NBL) 1992–1993; Hamilton Canucks (AHL) 1992–1994; Hamilton Bulldogs (AHL) 1996–2015; Ontario Raiders (NLL) 1998; Hamilton Honey Badgers (CEBL) 2019–2022; Hamilton Bulldogs (OHL) 2015–2023; Toronto Rock (NLL) 2021–2024, 2026–present Hamilton Hammers (AHL) 2026–present Hamilton Havoc (PWHL) 2026–present

Website
- www.tdcoliseum.com

TD Coliseum (formerly Copps Coliseum and FirstOntario Centre) is a sports and entertainment arena at the corner of Bay Street North and York Boulevard in Hamilton, Ontario, Canada. Opened in 1985 as Copps Coliseum, it has a capacity of up to 18,000. It is the home of the Hamilton Hammers of the American Hockey League (AHL) and the Hamilton Havoc of the Professional Women's Hockey League (PWHL).

== History ==
Hamilton was left without a large ice hockey venue after the Barton Street Arena was demolished in 1977, and even that arena had a small seating capacity by modern standards. Construction on the new site was started in 1983 and completed two years later at a cost of $33.5 million, with an additional $2.3 million spent on a parking garage. The project was overseen by Hamiltonian Joseph Pigott. The arena was originally named Copps Coliseum after long-time mayor Victor Copps, the patriarch of a Hamilton political family that includes his daughter, former Member of Parliament of Canada and Member of Provincial Parliament of Ontario Sheila Copps, and wife, Geraldine, who was a long-time councillor.

The arena's first scoreboard was purchased from the Winnipeg Arena for $214,000. That original Day Signs/Naden scoreboard, built in Toronto, was replaced in the early-1990s by a centre-hung scoreboard with an electronic message centre on each side. In turn, it was replaced by the current scoreboard, which was built in Hamilton by Media Resources, featuring an LED video board on each side.

The arena has hosted many teams and events over the years. The Hamilton Steelhawks of the Ontario Hockey League (OHL) began play at the arena in 1985. The 1986 World Junior Ice Hockey Championships were held in Southern Ontario, with Copps Coliseum used as the primary venue. In a decisive game, the undefeated Soviet Union handed Canada its first loss, 4–1. Copps was the primary host for the 1987 Canada Cup, and the site of the famous Gretzky to Lemieux goal that beat the Soviets 6–5 in the final. The Dukes of Hamilton replaced the Steelhawks as the city's OHL team and played in Copps Coliseum from 1989 to 1991. The arena hosted the 1990 Memorial Cup and set the single game attendance record, on May 13, 1990, with 17,383 spectators watching the Oshawa Generals defeat the Kitchener Rangers, in the final, 4–3 in double overtime on a Bill Armstrong goal. The venue hosted a number of games in the 1991 Canada Cup, including the finals, when Canada defeated the United States.

The first WWF Royal Rumble, which was shown on the USA Network, was held in the arena on January 24, 1988. Copps hosted the WWF pay-per-view Breakdown: In Your House on September 27, 1998, and the Billy Graham crusade that year, attended by 19,000 spectators each night. The Grateful Dead played the Coliseum on four occasions, with two dates in 1990 and two dates in 1992.

Although the 2009 plan for the 2015 Pan American Games based around Toronto was to host the volleyball tournament in Copps Coliseum, eventually it was held in the Toronto Exhibition Centre.

On January 3, 2014, Nitro Circus performed at the stadium for the first ever and only stop in Canada. Due to the high-risk nature of their stunt-based shows, most North American venues will not host the events.

On January 27, 2014, Hamilton City council voted unanimously to approve a $3.5-million deal to rename Copps Coliseum after local credit union FirstOntario. The city unveiled the new look signage, FirstOntario Centre, later that spring. A smaller sign reading "In honour of Victor K. Copps" appears to its right on the Bay side of the arena, and below it on the York side.

In November 2022, it was announced that beginning in the late summer of 2023, the arena would close for 20 months due to renovations. This would force the Bulldogs and Rock to relocate for all of the 2023–24 season and most of the 2024–25 season. As a result of the closure, the Honey Badgers decided to permanently relocate to Brampton, Ontario and the Bulldogs relocated to Brantford, Ontario. The renovations were delayed until December 2023 which allowed the Rock to play their first couple games of the 2023–24 season at the arena, before moving to the Paramount Fine Foods Centre in Mississauga, Ontario. This also allowed five Cirque du Soleil performances at the arena before its closing. However, in September 2023, it was announced that renovations would be delayed once again and that the Toronto Rock would play the entirety of the 2023–24 season in Hamilton. Major construction finally began in May 2024 with completion planned for December 2025. On June 25, 2025, the venue had its name changed to TD Coliseum. The venue reopened on November 21, 2025, with an inaugural concert from Paul McCartney.

=== Basketball ===
The Hamilton Skyhawks debuted with a 101–99 win over the Halifax Windjammers in World Basketball League play, in 1992. The league folded during the season, and several Canadian teams, including the Skyhawks formed the National Basketball League for 1993, but the Hawks moved to Edmonton for the playoffs, then folded.

The Coliseum was host to the 1994 FIBA World Championship, along with Maple Leaf Gardens and SkyDome. The next year, the Centre hosted the FIBA Americas Championship for Women, which was won by Canada. During their first two seasons of play (1995–96 and 1996–97), prior to the completion of construction on their new home the Air Canada Centre, the Toronto Raptors played three regular season games at Copps Coliseum, as well as a preseason game in 1997. In 1998 due to a strange twist of scheduling conflicts the Toronto Raptors thought they had to play their final regular season game in Hamilton, as the Toronto Blue Jays had first right of refusal for all SkyDome dates. The Raptors initial attempts to play the April 19 match at Maple Leaf Gardens were unsuccessful, but were later approved.

=== Curling ===
In 2007, from March 3 to 11, Copps Coliseum hosted the 2007 Tim Hortons Brier, the annual Canadian men's curling championship. The Coliseum hosted the West 49 Canadian Open, from September 20 to October 1.

Copps Coliseum was also the host venue for the 1996 World Men's Curling Championship, which was won by the Canadian team skipped by Jeff Stoughton

=== Hockey ===
==== AHL and OHL ====
The American Hockey League expanded to Copps in 1992 in the form of Vancouver's affiliate, the Hamilton Canucks. After two seasons, the team was moved to Syracuse, where they became one of the league's most stable franchises.

In October 1996, Copps Coliseum became home to the Hamilton Bulldogs of the American Hockey League. The Bulldogs, who were the top affiliate of the Edmonton Oilers (1996–2003) and the Montreal Canadiens (2002–2015), brought over 2 million fans to the arena. On June 7, 2007, the AHL Hamilton Bulldogs won their first Calder Cup Championship in franchise history at home in Copps Coliseum, defeating the Hershey Bears.

In 2015, Montreal moved its AHL affiliate to St. John's, and the Ontario Hockey League's Belleville Bulls moved to Hamilton to carry the Bulldogs banner, and Hamilton's traditional black and yellow colours, in the junior league. The Bulldogs were the primary tenant in the facility until their move to Brantford became permanent in 2025.

In January 2026, it was reported that the Bridgeport Islanders, the American Hockey League (AHL) affiliate of the New York Islanders, were planning on moving to Hamilton from Bridgeport. On March 31, 2026, the AHL announced that the move had been approved unanimously by the league's board of governors.

The Hamilton Hammers play at TD Coliseum in the AHL's North Division. The team's home opener game took place on October 9, 2026, ending in a 5–4 shootout loss to the Toronto Marlies before a crowd of 14,131 people.

==== NHL ambitions ====
Copps Coliseum was built to National Hockey League capacity and specifications in the hope that it would allow Hamilton to acquire an NHL expansion franchise. However, said arena is just 58 kilometres (36 mi) from the home venue of the Toronto Maple Leafs and 93 kilometres (58 mi) from the home venue of the Buffalo Sabres, both of which have opposed an NHL franchise in Hamilton. Copps hosted 8 regular-season neutral-site games during the 1992–93 and 1993–94 seasons, mostly featuring the Maple Leafs or Sabres.

In 2007, Waterloo billionaire Jim Balsillie, co-CEO of Research in Motion, made an offer to purchase the Nashville Predators for $220 million US. His intention was to move the team to Hamilton and either use Copps Coliseum as a temporary home while a new state-of-the-art arena could be built, or to renovate the Coliseum to bring it up to modern NHL standards. The bid was unsuccessful. In the spring of 2009, the Phoenix Coyotes filed for bankruptcy and Jim Balsillie immediately offered a rumoured $212.5 million US, while stating he wanted to move the franchise to southwestern Ontario. Balsillie applied for a lease option which, should the relocation have succeeded, would have invoked a 20-year lease for the team to play at Copps Coliseum. On May 9, 2009, the Toronto Star, Hamilton Spectator and others reported that Hamilton mayor Fred Eisenberger was to meet with a second group interested in securing a lease. The group, led by Vancouver businessmen Tom Gaglardi and Nelson Skalbania, was interested in securing an interest in the Atlanta Thrashers and moving them to the centre for the 2010–11 NHL season. The team moved to Winnipeg in 2011, becoming the second incarnation of the Winnipeg Jets instead. On May 13, 2009, Balsillie won the exclusive rights to a long-term lease of Copps Coliseum after a unanimous vote by Hamilton city council. On May 29, 2009, Balsillie unveiled his plans to renovate the Centre into a state-of-the-art facility in anticipation of an NHL franchise coming to Hamilton. In September 2009, an Arizona bankruptcy judge blocked the sale of the Coyotes. Balsillie relented and ended his pursuit of an NHL team.

==== PWHL ====
On January 3, 2026, TD Coliseum hosted the Professional Women's Hockey League's Seattle Torrent and Toronto Sceptres for a Takeover Tour game and the first PWHL game in Hamilton. The Torrent won 3–2 against the Sceptres in front of 16,012 fans.

On May 13, 2026, Hamilton was awarded an expansion team; the Hamilton Havoc will begin play at TD Coliseum for the 2026–27 season.

=== Lacrosse ===
The Ontario Raiders started as an National Lacrosse League (NLL) expansion team in the 1998 season, and played their home games at Copps. They relocated to Toronto in 1999 and took the name "Toronto Rock". The team returned to Hamilton for the 2021-2022 season, but continues to represent Toronto.

=== Concerts ===
Over the last 40 years, TD Coliseum has hosted many live events with artists such as AC/DC, Aerosmith, Alanis Morissette, Alice Cooper, Alice In Chains, Alex Warren, Andrea Bocelli, ATEEZ, Avril Lavigne, 5 Seconds of Summer, Backstreet Boys, Billy Joel, BLACKPINK, Bon Jovi, Brad Paisley, Bring Me The Horizon, Britney Spears, Bruce Springsteen, BTS, Bryan Adams, Cardi B, Carrie Underwood, Céline Dion, Charlie Puth, Cher, Def Leppard, Demi Lovato, Depeche Mode, Diana Ross, Earth, Wind, & Fire, Elton John, Ella Langley, Eric Clapton, Falling In Reverse, Florida Georgia Line, Garth Brooks, Ghost, Grateful Dead, Green Day, Guns N' Roses, Hatsune Miku, Hilary Duff, John Mellencamp, Jonas Brothers, Journey, Kanye West, Katseye, Kenny Rogers, KISS, Lionel Richie, Marilyn Manson, Maroon 5, Megadeth, Melanie Martinez, Metallica, MGK, Miranda Lambert, Motley Crue, Mother Mother, Neil Diamond, Nelly Furtado, Nickelback, Nine Inch Nails, Ozzy Osbourne, Pantera, Paul McCartney, Pearl Jam, Phoebe Bridgers, Rage Against The Machine, Reba McEntire, Rush, Selena Gomez & The Scene, Shania Twain, System Of A Down, Ted Nugent, The Lumineers, The Smashing Pumpkins, The Who, Tim McGraw, Trans-Siberian Orchestra, TWICE, U2, Weezer, Willie Nelson, and YOASOBI.

== Images ==
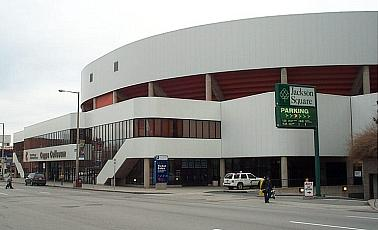
TD Coliseum (Copps Coliseum), Bay St., looking north

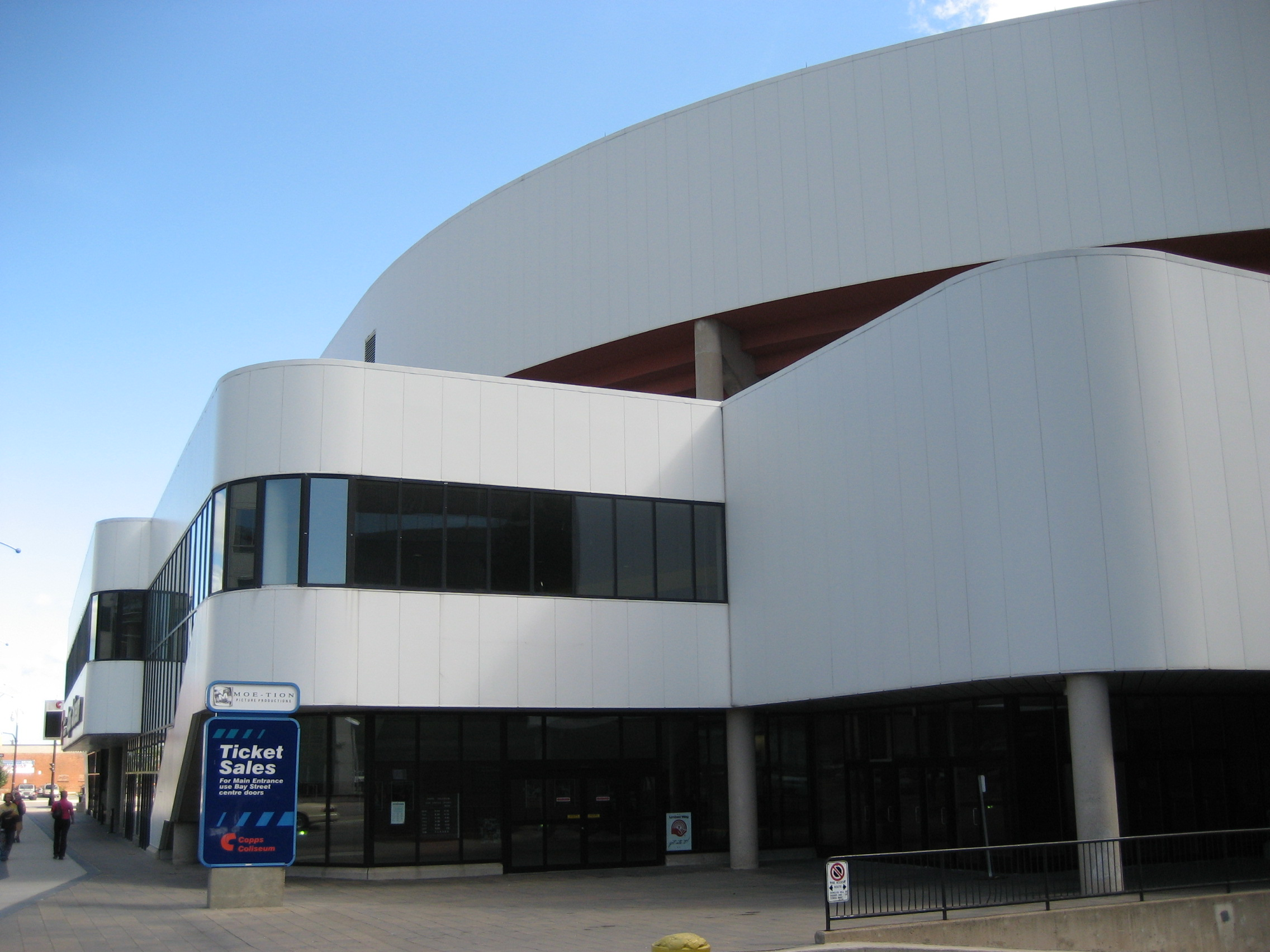
TD Coliseum (Copps Coliseum) Centre

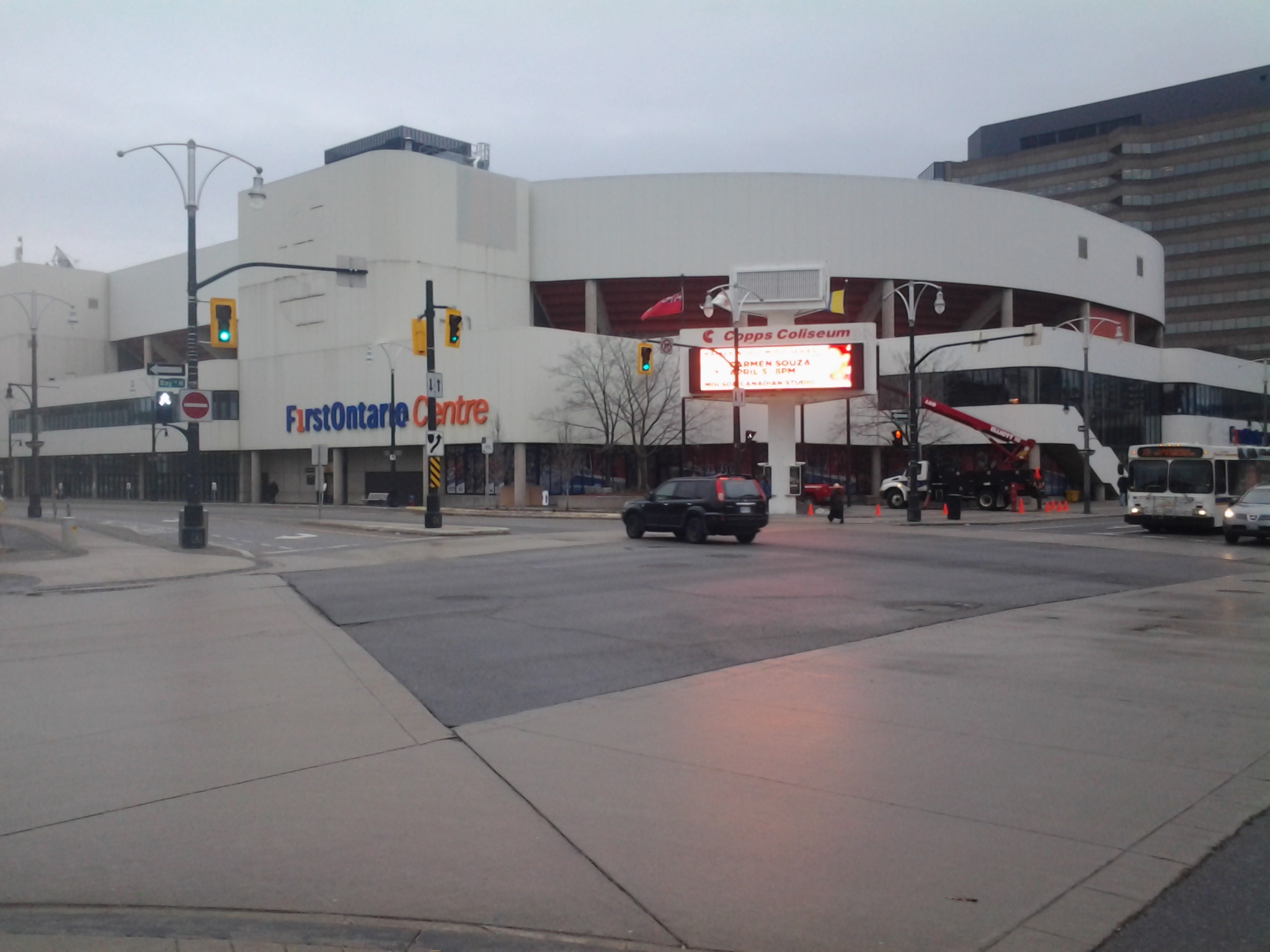
TD Coliseum (FirstOntario Centre) looking east on York Boulevard

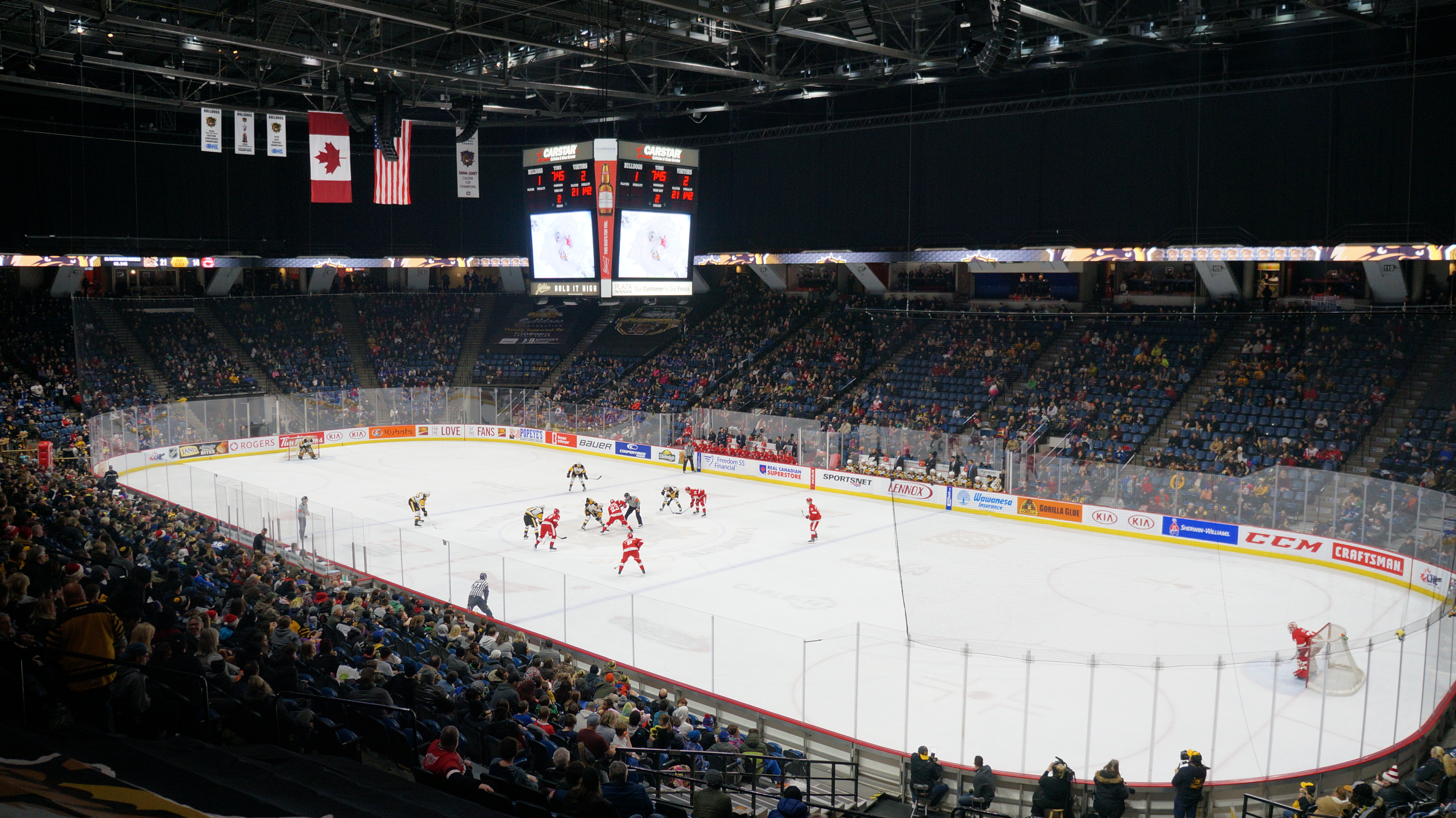
The interior of TD Coliseum (FirstOntario Centre) in December 2018

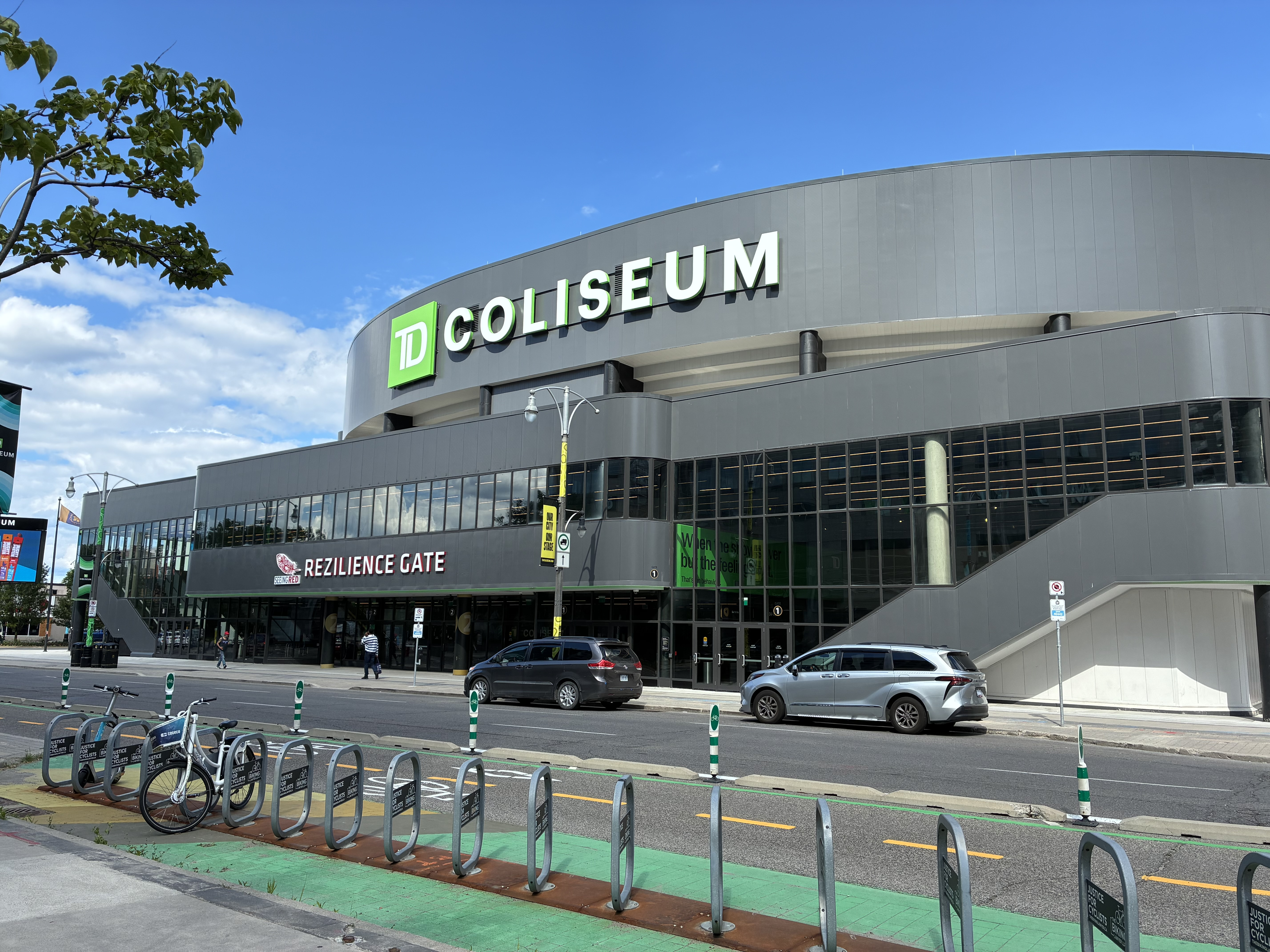
TD Coliseum by day

== See also ==
- FirstOntario Concert Hall
- Hamilton Convention Centre
- Art Gallery of Hamilton
- Lloyd D. Jackson Square
- List of sports venues in Hamilton, Ontario
- List of indoor arenas in Canada
