= Sports teams in the Halifax Regional Municipality =

This page has the sports teams and venues in Nova Scotia's Halifax Regional Municipality:

== Current teams ==
=== Professional ===
Club	League	Venue	Founded	Championships
HFX Wanderers FC	Canadian Premier League	Wanderers Grounds	2018	0
Halifax Thunderbirds	National Lacrosse League	Scotiabank Centre	2019	0
Halifax Tides FC	Northern Super League	Wanderers Grounds	2024	0
Halifax Hoopers	The Basketball League	Zatzman Sportsplex	2024	0

=== Junior or Developmental Leagues ===
Club	League	Venue	Founded	Championships
Halifax Mooseheads	Quebec Maritimes Junior Hockey League	Scotiabank Centre	1994	1

=== University Athletics ===
University	Nickname	League	Division
Dalhousie University	Tigers	U Sports	Atlantic University Sport
Mount Saint Vincent University	Mystics	Canadian Collegiate Athletic Association	Atlantic Collegiate Athletic Association
Saint Mary's University	Huskies	U Sports	Atlantic University Sport
University of King's College	Blue Devils	Canadian Collegiate Athletic Association	Atlantic Collegiate Athletic Association

== Former teams ==
Club	League	Venue	From	Until	Championships	Note
Nova Scotia Voyageurs	American Hockey League	(71-78) Halifax Forum, (78-84) Scotiabank Centre	1971	1984	3	Relocated (St. John's IceCaps)
Nova Scotia Oilers	American Hockey League	Scotiabank Centre	1984	1988	0	Relocated (Bakersfield Condors)
Halifax Citadels	American Hockey League	Scotiabank Centre	1988	1993	0	Relocated (Wilkes-Barre/Scranton Penguins)
Nova Scotia Clippers	Canadian Soccer League	Beazley Field	1991	1992	0	League folded
Halifax Windjammers	World Basketball League (91-92); National Basketball League (93-94)	Scotiabank Centre	1991	1994	0	Both leagues folded
Halifax Rainmen	National Basketball League of Canada	Scotiabank Centre	2006	2015	0	Bankruptcy
Halifax Hurricanes	National Basketball League of Canada	Scotiabank Centre	2015	2020	1	Bankruptcy

== Major venues ==
=== Indoor ===
Venue	Capacity	Built	Uses
Scotiabank Centre	10,595 (hockey); 11,093 (basketball)	1978	Multi-use
Halifax Forum	5,600	1927	Multi-use
Zatzman Sportsplex	3,000	1982	Hockey and basketball

=== Outdoor ===
Venue	Capacity	Built	Uses
Wanderers Grounds	7,000	1880s	Multi-use
Scotia Speedworld	6,000	1987	Auto racing
Huskies Stadium	5,000	1970	Multi-use
DWickwire Field	2,000	1950s	Multi-use
