= McKinley Singleton =

American basketball player (born 1961)

Personal information
- Born: October 29, 1961 (age 65) Memphis, Tennessee, U.S.
- Listed height: 6 ft 5 in (1.96 m)
- Listed weight: 175 lb (79 kg)

Career information
- High school: Booker T. Washington (Memphis, Tennessee)
- College: Shelby State JC (1979–1981); UAB (1982–1984)
- NBA draft: 1984: 6th round, 120th overall pick
- Drafted by: Milwaukee Bucks
- Position: Point guard
- Number: 26

Career history
- 1984–1987: Wisconsin Flyers
- 1986: New York Knicks
- 1987–1988: Rochester Flyers
- 1988–1989: Pensacola Tornados
- 1991: Columbus Horizon
- 1991–1992: Yakima Sun Kings
- 1992: Grand Rapids Hoops
- 1992–199?: Jackson Jammers
- 1993: Tri-City Chinook
- 1993–?: Saskatoon Slam

Career highlights
- NBL champion (1993); Sun Belt tournament MVP (1984)
- Stats at NBA.com
- Stats at Basketball Reference

McKinley Singleton (born October 29, 1961) is an American former professional basketball player who played the point guard position.

During his senior season in college with UAB in 1984, he won the Sun Belt Conference men's basketball tournament and was named the tournaments MVP.

Singleton was drafted by the Milwaukee Bucks in the sixth round of the 1984 NBA draft, but was waived by the team before the season began. He later played two games with the New York Knicks during the 1986-87 NBA season.

In 1993, he won the Canadian NBL championship with the Saskatoon Slam.

== Career statistics ==
Legend
GP	Games played	GS	Games started	MPG	Minutes per game
FG%	Field goal percentage	3P%	3-point field goal percentage	FT%	Free throw percentage
RPG	Rebounds per game	APG	Assists per game	SPG	Steals per game
BPG	Blocks per game	PPG	Points per game	**Bold**	Career high

=== NBA ===
==== Regular season ====
Year	Team	GP	GS	MPG	FG%	3P%	FT%	RPG	APG	SPG	BPG	PPG
1986–87	New York	2	0	5.0	.667	.000	–	.0	.5	.0	.0	2.0
