= Centre 200 =

Arena in Sydney, Nova Scotia

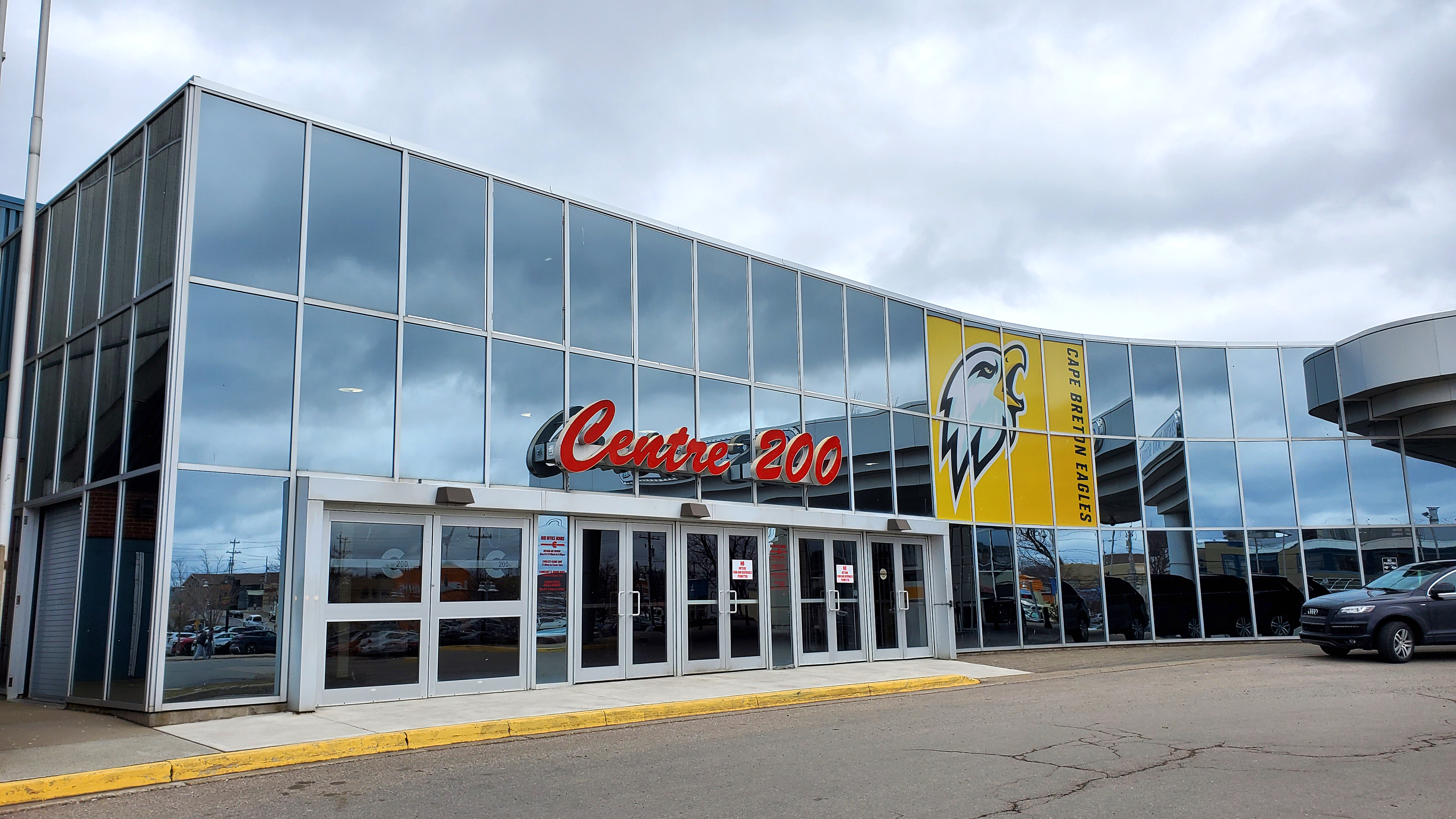
- Centre 200 in 2022

- Location within Nova Scotia Location within Canada
- Address: 481 George Street; Sydney, Nova Scotia; B1P 6R7
- Coordinates: 46°08′15″N 60°11′25″W
- Owner: CBRM
- Capacity: Hockey: ~5,000; Concerts: up to 6,500

Construction
- Groundbreaking: 1985
- Opened: 1987

Tenants
- Cape Breton Eagles (QMJHL) (1997–present); Cape Breton Islanders (MHL) (1996–1997); Cape Breton Oilers (AHL) (1988–1996); Cape Breton Breakers (NBL) (1993–1994); Cape Breton Highlanders (NBL Canada) (2016–2019)

Centre 200 is Cape Breton's primary sports and entertainment facility, located in Sydney, Nova Scotia. It is home to the QMJHL's Cape Breton Eagles. Besides ice hockey, the arena hosts many other events, such as rock concerts, figure skating, and antique/custom car shows. The facility features an obstruction-free sports arena that seats 5,000 people, expandable seating to 6,500 for concert hall purposes, and exhibit space of 17,000 sq ft (1,600 m^{2}) with the possibility of another 3,000 sq ft (280 m^{2}) upon removal of telescopic seating.

== History ==
=== Notable events ===
Centre 200 was conceived as a bicentennial project of the municipality, and was constructed next door and attached to the old Sydney Forum (the Forum was later torn down and replaced with a casino) in the downtown area. The venue opened in early 1987, and hosted a concert by musician Bryan Adams as its first major event. It was the primary sporting venue for the 1987 Canada Winter Games and hosted the opening ceremonies which were attended by then-Prime Minister Brian Mulroney.

From 1988 to 1996, the arena was home to professional ice hockey, the American Hockey League's Cape Breton Oilers, until the parent Edmonton Oilers elected to relocate the team to Hamilton, Ontario. In 1993, the Oilers won the AHL's Calder Cup championship in front of a sellout crowd at Centre 200.

In 1993 and 1994, the arena was home to the Cape Breton Breakers of the National Basketball League (NBL). The NBL folded on July 9, 1994.

The arena hosted the MJAHL's Cape Breton Islanders for the 1996–97 season.

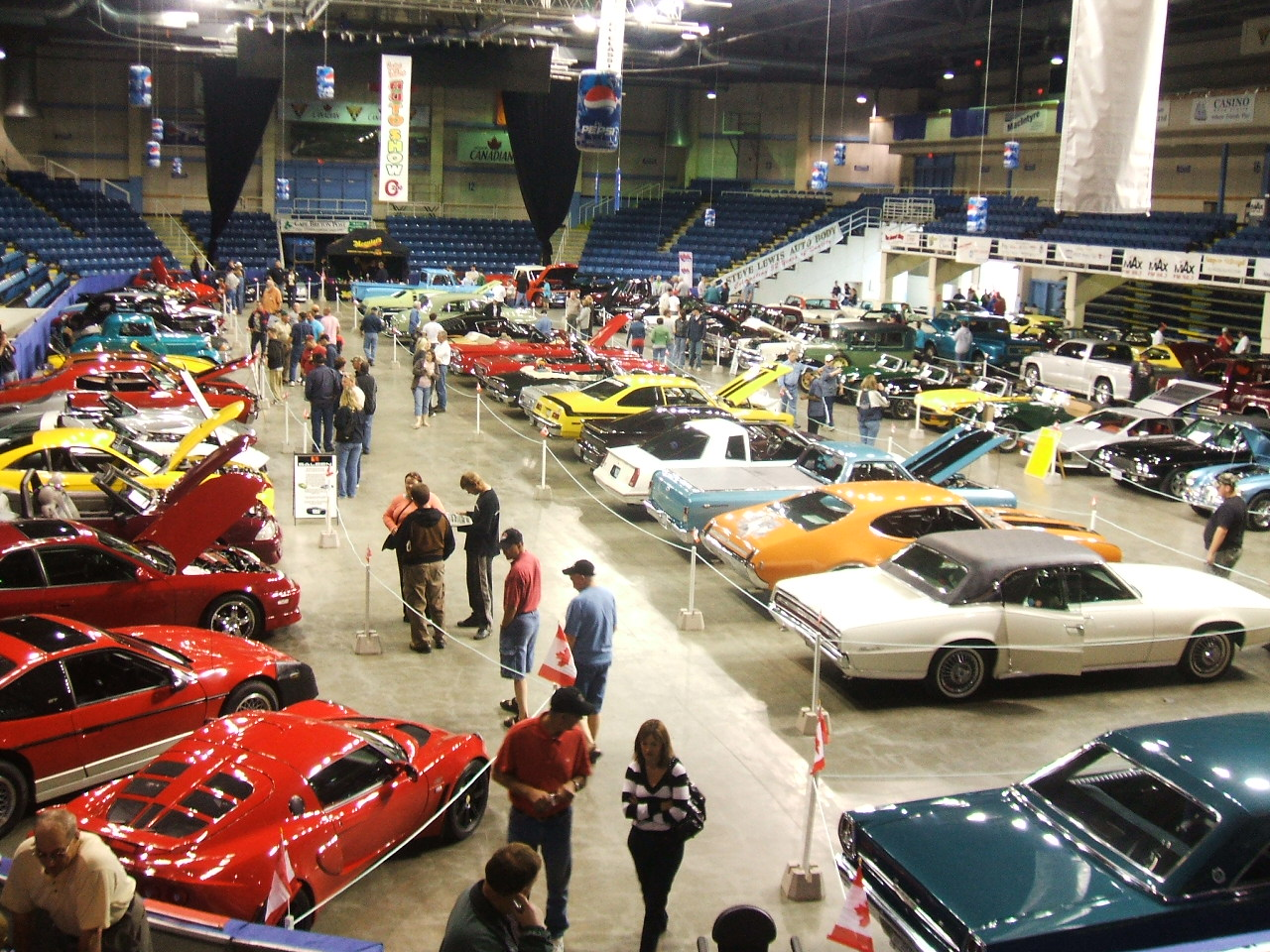
Antique & Custom car show at Centre 200 in 2008.

Prior to the 1997–98 QMJHL season, the Granby Prédateurs, winners of the 1996 Memorial Cup, relocated from Granby, Quebec to Sydney, Nova Scotia and were renamed the Cape Breton Screaming Eagles (and later Cape Breton Eagles). The team, which won a division title in 2003–04, remains Centre 200's primary tenant. Future National Hockey League stars such as Sidney Crosby, Marc-André Fleury, and Vincent Lecavalier have skated at Centre 200 as QMJHL players.

In March 2000, Centre 200 hosted the 2000 Esso Canadian National Championship for women's ice hockey, during which Ontario defeated Quebec to win the gold medal. Centre 200 co-hosted the 2003 World Junior Ice Hockey Championships, along with the Halifax Metro Centre in Halifax, Nova Scotia. The arena is very popular for community ice hockey, annually hosting both the Sydney Academy Blue and White Pepsi Challenge Cup and the Royal Canadian Legion Bantam AAA Challenge Cup. The tournaments and games provide hospitality for teams from all over Nova Scotia and generally draw large crowds.

Centre 200 hosted the 2008 QMJHL Entry Draft, which was projected to inject over $2 million into the local economy. The arena also hosted game one of the 2008 ADT Canada-Russia Challenge in November 2008.

Aside from ice hockey, Centre 200 has also hosted performances by popular acts such as Rush, Metallica, Elton John, The Tragically Hip, Celine Dion, Rod Stewart, Nickelback, Rita MacNeil, The Rankin Family, World Wrestling Entertainment events, among many others.

In March 2009, it was announced that major renovations would occur to the arena, thanks to financial contributions from the Provincial and federal governments, the municipality and $500,000 from the Cape Breton Screaming Eagles. Renovations include a new video scoreboard, 13 luxury boxes and new club seating. It is anticipated that the renovations will increase the building's capacity to over 5,000.

In December 2013–January 2014, Centre 200 was one of the host arenas for the 2014 World U-17 Hockey Challenge. Team USA went on to win the tournament 4–0 against Team Pacific.

In 2018, the venue hosted concerts by Bryan Adams and Chicago.

Centre 200 was host for both the 2019 Scotties Tournament of Hearts Canadian national women's curling competition, and the 2024 World Women's Curling Championship.

=== Naming ===
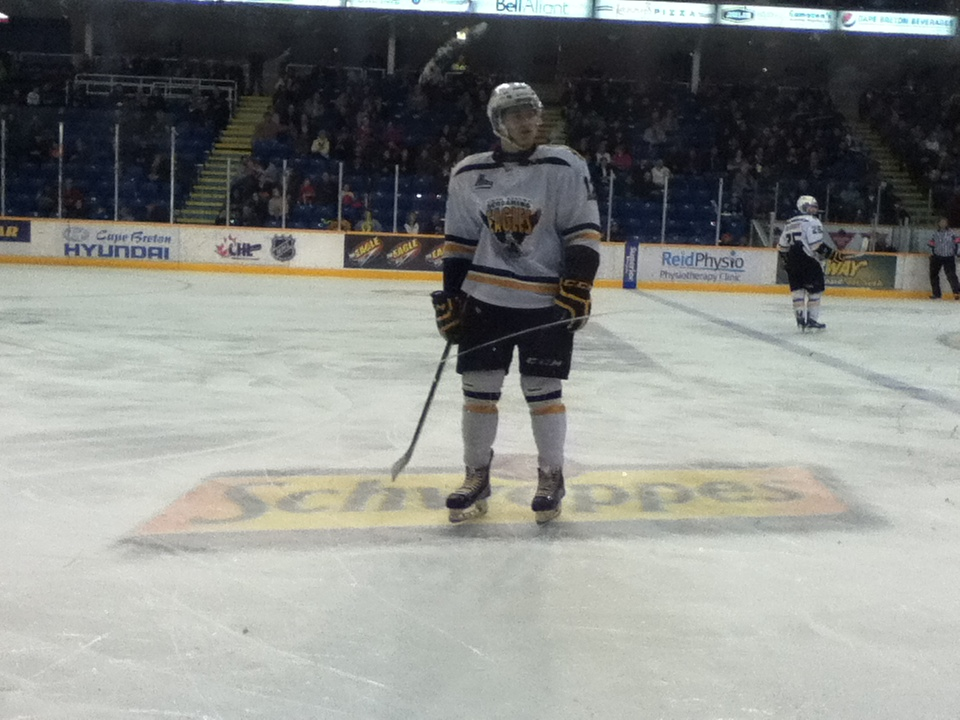
The Cape Breton Eagles have called Centre 200 home since 1997.

Centre 200 is named in honour of the two-hundredth anniversary of the founding of Sydney, which took place in 1785. In the original vision, the venue was to have a larger seating capacity but funding issues led to a smaller venue than originally proposed.

=== Location ===
Centre 200 is located on George Street, which lies in the heart of Sydney. The arena is connected to a Casino Nova Scotia which was added in 1995, and hosts a Tim Hortons restaurant within its parking lot, generally bringing good business to both venues when Centre 200 hosts an event. However, frequent traffic congestion and shortage of convenient parking spaces has drawn criticism from attendees.
