= Eleanor R. Baldwin Arena =

Arena in Boca Raton, Florida

- "The Burrow"
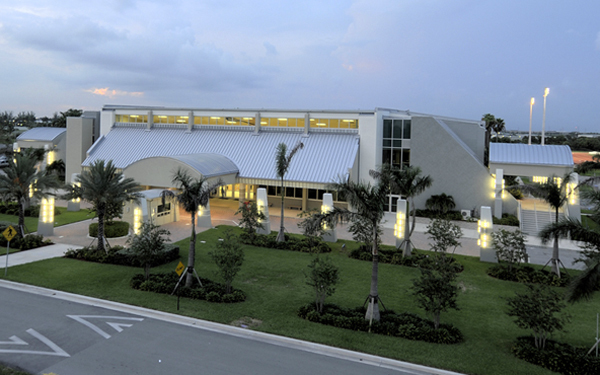
- Interactive map of Eleanor R. Baldwin Arena
- Former names: FAU Arena (1984–2019, 2020–2022); RoofClaim.com Arena (2019–2020)
- Location: Florida Atlantic University; 777 Glades Road; Boca Raton, Florida 33431
- Coordinates: 26°22′20″N 80°6′33″W
- Owner: Florida Atlantic University
- Operator: Florida Atlantic University
- Capacity: 3,161
- Record attendance: 3,161 (multiple)

Construction
- Opened: 1984
- Cost: $9 million renovation upgrade (March–August 2007)

Tenants
- Florida Atlantic University; Men's basketball Women's basketball Volleyball Florida Jades (WBL) (1991–92)

Eleanor R. Baldwin Arena, formerly known as FAU Arena and RoofClaim.com Arena and commonly known as The Burrow, is a 2,900-seat multi-purpose arena located on the Boca Raton campus of Florida Atlantic University.

== Renovations ==
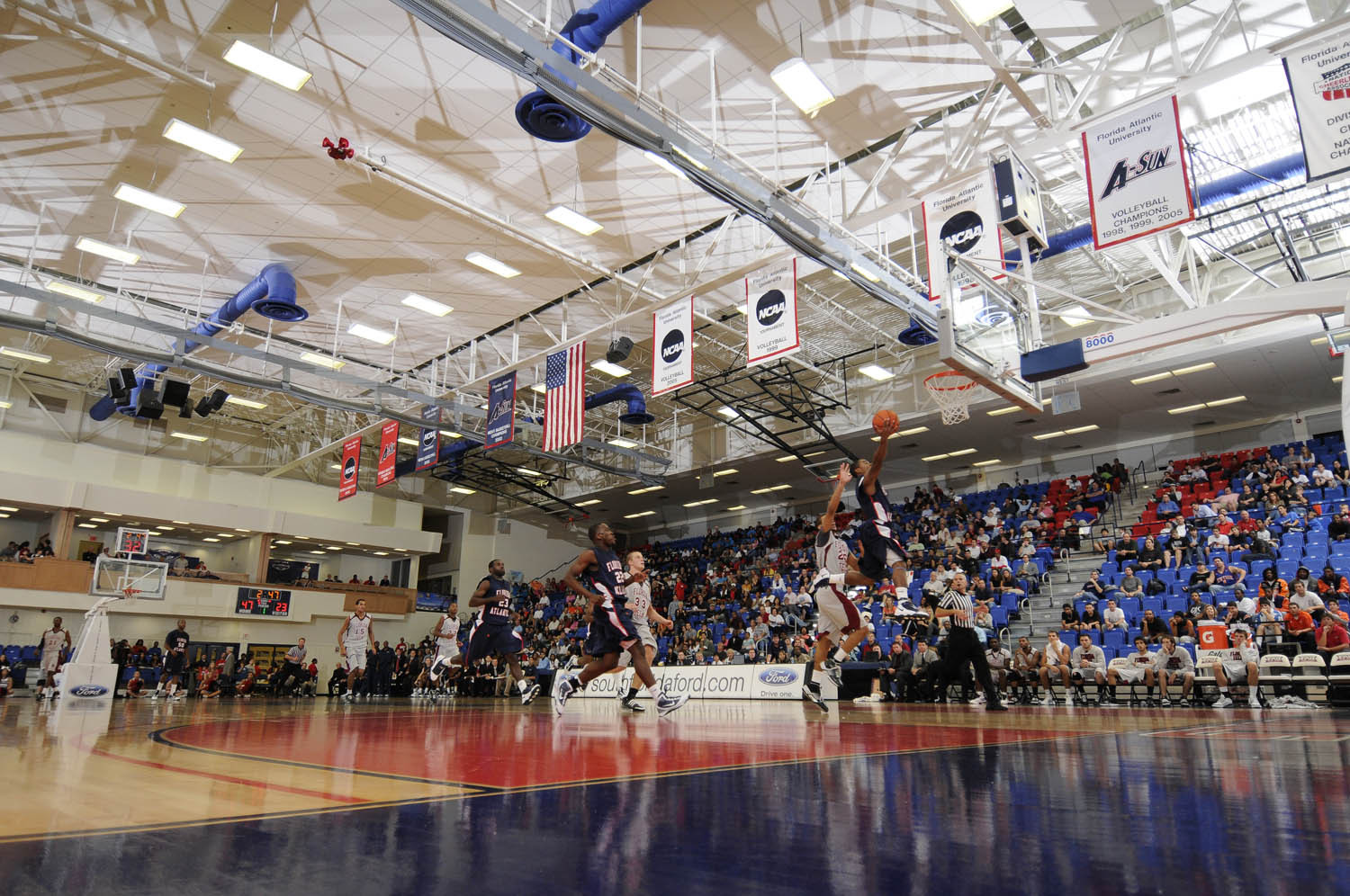
Florida Atlantic Owls playing Florida Tech in the Burrow

FAU Arena opened to women's basketball in 1984. Men's basketball and volleyball became tenants in 1988.

The facility was modernized with a $9 million renovation in 2007. In the summer of 2008, further renovations were put in place, including club suites to give "The Burrow" a new feel as the programs continue to grow.

Following the 2006-07 basketball season, the major renovations to FAU Arena included such upgrades as:

- Exterior, including entrance overhangs and complete repainting
- Chairback seating behind both baskets and the west sideline
- New Scoreboard with Video Capabilities
- Locker room expansion(s) and enhancements
- Improved student section area on the east sideline
- FAU Store in the lobby
- Ticket booth outside the main entrance

In late 2019, the scoreboards and sideline ads were updated.

== Naming rights ==
On June 4, 2019, the FAU athletic department received a $3 million gift from the Rocco and Marty Abessinio Foundation to name the court the Abessinio Court at the FAU Arena.

On December 20, 2019, the FAU athletic department partnered with RoofClaim.com, a roofing services company, on a $5 million, 10-year sponsorship, which gave the company naming rights to the arena, which was renamed as the RoofClaim.com Arena. This naming rights deal ended on February 5, 2020, by mutual agreement of both parties; a report from the Orlando Sentinel stated that political pressure ended the deal.

On November 16, 2022, the FAU athletic department received a $7.5 million gift from Eleanor R. Baldwin to rename the arena as the Eleanor R. Baldwin Arena.

== See also ==
- List of NCAA Division I basketball arenas
