= SaskTel Centre =

Multi-use indoor arena in Saskatoon, Saskatchewan

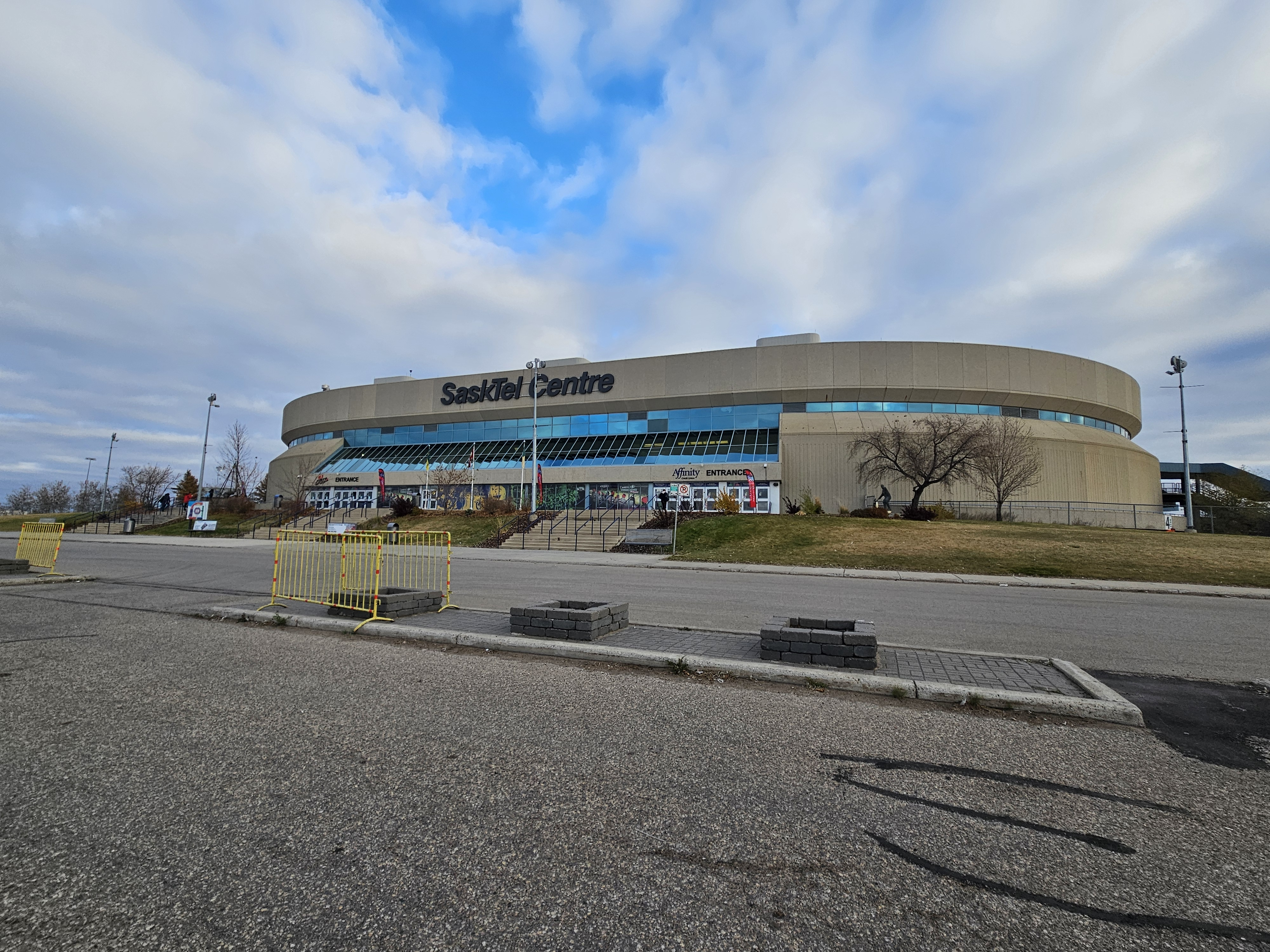

- Location within Saskatchewan Location within Canada
- Former names: Saskatchewan Place (1988–2004); Credit Union Centre (2004–2014)
- Address: 3315 Thatcher Avenue
- Location: Saskatoon, Saskatchewan, Canada
- Coordinates: 52.189°N 106.679°W
- Owner: City of Saskatoon
- Capacity: 15,100; Lacrosse: 15,195
- Executive suites: 51
- Surface: Ice, Turf, Court
- Record attendance: 16,874 Metallica WorldWired Tour, September 15, 2018

Construction
- Groundbreaking: September 11, 1986
- Opened: February 9, 1988
- Expanded: 1990, 2009
- Cost: C$24.8 million ($62.1 million in 2025 dollars) $6.7 million (2009 expansion) ($9.64 million in 2025 dollars)
- Architects: Ferguson Folstad Friggstad Architects, PBK Architects, Inc.
- Structural engineer: Cochrane Lavalin Consulting Engineers
- General contractors: Carlson Constructors, Ltd.

Tenants
- Saskatoon Blades (WHL) (1988–present); Saskatchewan Rush (NLL) (2016–present); Saskatoon Mamba (CEBL) (2019–present); Saskatchewan Storm (WBL) (1990–92); Saskatoon Slam (NBL) (1992–94); Saskatchewan Hawks (IBA/CBA) (2000–02); Saskatoon Accelerators (CMISL) (2007–09); Saskatoon Sirens (LFL Canada) (2012)

Website
- sasktelcentre.com

SaskTel Centre (formerly Credit Union Centre, and originally Saskatchewan Place; informally also known as Sask Place) is an arena located in Saskatoon, Saskatchewan, Canada. The facility opened in February 1988 and is currently the home venue of the Saskatoon Blades of the Western Hockey League, the Saskatoon Mamba of the Canadian Elite Basketball League, and the Saskatchewan Rush of the National Lacrosse League, with the arena being referred to as Co-op Field at SaskTel Centre during Rush games.

== History ==
The interior of SaskTel Centre prior to a Saskatchewan Rush game.

SaskPlace was constructed as a replacement for Saskatoon Arena, a concrete building constructed in Saskatoon's downtown core in the 1930s. The building was in use until 1988, hosting its final hockey game only a week before SaskPlace opened. Nicknamed "The Barn", the facility had outlived its usefulness some 20 years earlier and had become infamous for leaky roofs and substandard amenities. Yet the city was hesitant to lose the landmark, and a number of years passed between the 1970s proposal to replace the structure and the eventual demolition of the Arena and the opening of SaskPlace in the late 1980s.

In 1982, the city approved a proposal to build a new 5,000 seat arena at the city's Exhibition grounds south of the downtown core. However, by 1983 local sports promoter Bill Hunter was attempting to purchase the St. Louis Blues of the National Hockey League with a plan to relocate the team to Saskatoon; part of this plan included building an 18,000-seat arena. Two locations for this much larger arena were suggested: the site of a decommissioned power plant downtown, just west of Saskatoon Arena, and a site north of the city's airport in the North Industrial area. Despite Hunter's best efforts, the NHL ultimately rejected his offer and plans to relocate an NHL team collapsed. Even so, the city had shifted planning to building a larger arena, and debate continued about the preferred location. City Council narrowly approved the north industrial proposal in a 6–5 vote in 1985. While mayor Cliff Wright and alderman and future mayor Henry Dayday championed the location, some of council, including alderman Pat Lorje, advocated for a new downtown arena instead, wary of the long-term effects that losing the arena would have on the city's downtown. In addition, concern was expressed about the accessibility of the location north of the city. Public reaction to the council vote was mixed, and a petition with more than 16,000 signatures demanding a public vote resulted in a public plebiscite being held in conjunction with the 1985 civic election. In that plebiscite, Saskatoon residents rejected the downtown option, with 64% voting against it. A second plebiscite was held in 1986 to approve the north industrial location, which passed with 70% in favour. Construction thus proceeded on the north industrial location, and an 8,000-seat Saskatchewan Place was completed in 1988, expanded to 11,000 in 1990.

Despite the votes that led to the arena, the location remained polarizing in ensuing decades, especially as many hoped-for benefits of the north location, including an influx of new services and a relocation of the city's exhibition grounds adjacent to the site, failed to materialize. Moreover, the hoped-for NHL franchise never arrived either; Hunter tried again in the early 1990s, applying for an expansion team, but ultimately fell just short of securing adequate funding. However, the arena did host the NHL's first neutral-site game on October 13, 1992, a game between the Calgary Flames and Minnesota North Stars.

In the early 2000s, Saunders Avenue, a street leading into the parking lot of the arena, was renamed Bill Hunter Avenue in honour of Hunter, who died in 2002. This was considered ironic by many Saskatonians, given Hunter lobbied for the facility to be built in another location near the old Saskatoon Arena. The city then transferred the 'Saunders' name to a new street in the River Landing redevelopment area—running through the former site of the Saskatoon Arena.

=== Expansion ===
In 2008–09, the arena, then called the Credit Union Centre, was renovated for the 2010 World Junior Ice Hockey Championships. There were 2,981 seats added to the arena, increasing the capacity to more than 15,000. The cost of the expansion was pegged at $6.7 million. $2 million was requested as a loan from the city of Saskatoon and $3 million from a provincial grant. Hockey Canada may have also contributed about $500,000.

At this time, there was a proposal from Ice Edge Holdings to purchase the Phoenix Coyotes and begin playing five of the Coyotes' home games each season at Credit Union Centre, beginning in December 2009. The logic behind the move, which parallels the Bills Toronto Series in the NFL, was that although Saskatoon was likely too small to support an NHL team of its own, it would easily be able to sell out the Credit Union Centre for one game each month. However, by May 2011, Ice Edge Holdings had abandoned its plan to purchase the team.

In August 2014, SaskTel acquired the naming rights to the arena, renaming it SaskTel Centre.

In 2016, the Edmonton Rush of the National Lacrosse League relocated to Saskatoon as the Saskatchewan Rush, playing their home games at SaskTel Centre. In 2017, the team reached a naming rights sponsorship with Saskatoon Co-op, under which the arena is referred to as Co-op Field at SaskTel Centre during Rush games. The Professional Women's Hockey League (PWHL) played its first game in Saskatoon on January 30, 2027 between the Toronto Sceptres and Hamilton Havoc at the SaskTel Centre.

=== Future ===
A 2018 study recommended the construction of a new arena and convention centre in downtown Saskatoon to replace SaskTel Centre and TCU Place. Both venues were assessed as needing replacement, failing to meet standards in comparison to venues in equivalent markets, including the arena's inadequate space for large event staging and rigging, and poor location and accessibility.

In August 2022, following an evaluation of five potential sites, a report recommending one of two sites—one in the north downtown city yard, and one in the north parking lot of Midtown—was presented to city council. On November 16, 2022, the Midtown site was selected. A proposed design of the Downtown Entertainment and Event District, anchored by the new arena under the working title "Saskatchewan Place", was unveiled in February 2024.

== Major events ==
The arena's inaugural event was the Saskatoon Blades' first WHL game at the arena, in which they defeated the Brandon Wheat Kings 4–3. Troy Kennedy scored the first goal in the arena's history, while Kory Kocur scored the game's winning goal in front of a sell-out crowd of 9,343.

The Saskatoon Blades have hosted the Memorial Cup twice at SaskTel Centre. The first time was in 1989, the year after the arena opened; the Blades made it to the final, but lost 4–3 in overtime to the WHL champion Swift Current Broncos. They hosted again in 2013, but won just one match and failed to advance to final round.

Saskatchewan Place has twice hosted the IIHF World Junior Championship, first in 1991, and again in 2010, when Saskatoon co-hosted the tournament with Regina. The arena also hosted the 2018 4 Nations Cup women's tournament.

The arena has hosted several men's and women's national championships, including four Brier championships–1989, 2000, 2004, 2012–and one Tournament of Hearts, in 1991. SaskTel Centre also hosted the 2021 Canadian Olympic Curling Trials ahead of the 2022 Winter Olympics.

The Saskatchewan Rattlers hosted the inaugural CEBL Championship Weekend in 2019, which saw the Rattlers win the league's first title with a 94–83 win over the Hamilton Honey Badgers.

During a World Wrestling Federation taping at the arena on October 12, 1992 for a Coliseum Video release, Bret Hart of Calgary (whose father, Stu, was a Saskatoon native) defeated Ric Flair to win his first WWF World Heavyweight Championship. In a match taped for Superstars, Calgary's Bill Jordan was squashed by the debuting Yokozuna, who dethroned Hart the following April at WrestleMania IX. In March 2023, All Elite Wrestling (AEW) announced that it would broadcast Dynamite from SaskTel Centre on July 12, 2023, as part of a pair of shows in the province.

=== Concerts ===
Metallica performed at the arena in 1992.

On June 16 1988, the arena hosted a show by Tiffany.

In 2005, the arena hosted a gala command performance for Queen Elizabeth II and Prince Philip, hosted by Brent Butt, as part of a royal visit to Saskatchewan commemorating the province's centennial.

The arena hosted the 2007 Juno Awards. The Juno Awards were to return to SaskTel Centre in 2020, but the ceremony was cancelled on March 12 due to the COVID-19 pandemic.

In October 2014, the arena hosted a show by Demi Lovato of her Demi World Tour.

From June 9 to 12, 2016, SaskTel Centre hosted six sold-out performances by Garth Brooks and Trisha Yearwood as part of their World Tour. The shows broke a record for concert attendance at the arena—set by Brooks in 1996—averaging 15,776 per show and an estimated total of 94,655 attendees.

The single-concert record would be exceeded by Metallica's WorldWired Tour stop at SaskTel Centre in September 2018, attracting 16,874 attendees in one of only two Canadian stops on the tour. The band dedicated their performance of "Nothing Else Matters" to those who had died in the Humboldt Broncos bus crash.

In October 2019, SaskTel Centre hosted a two-night stop on Elton John's Farewell Yellow Brick Road tour.

== Attendance records ==
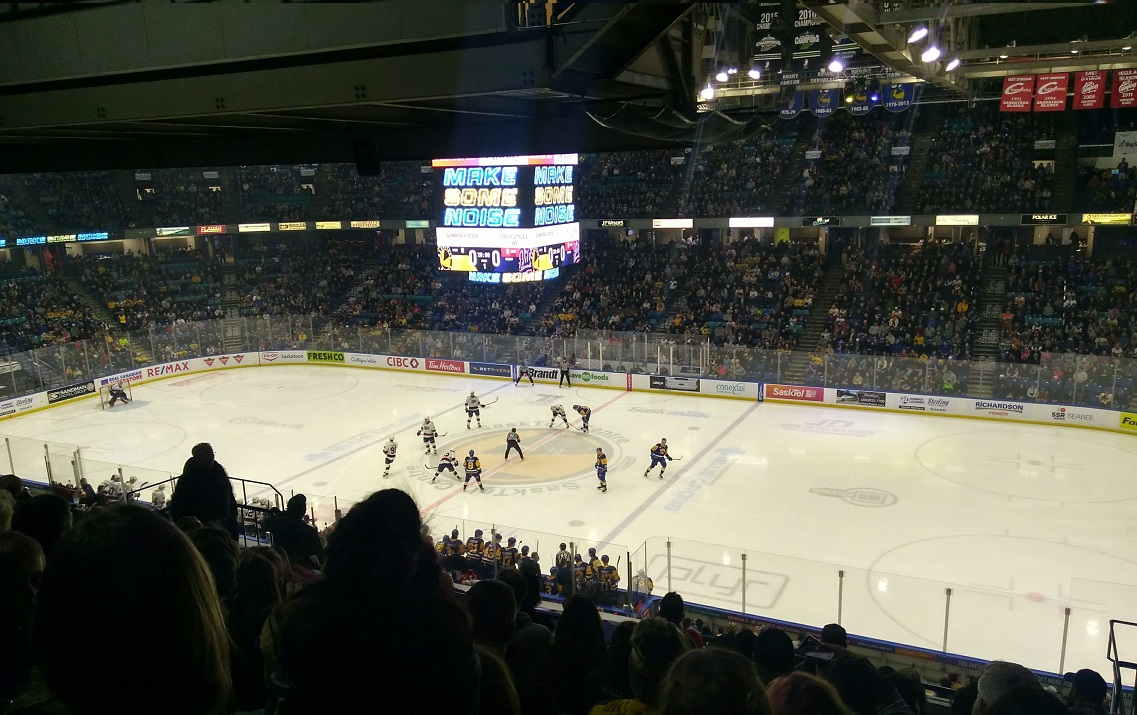
The Saskatoon Blades face off against the Regina Pats at SaskTel Centre

- The current attendance record for SaskTel Centre is 16,874, which was set on September 15, 2018 for a concert by Metallica.
- The largest crowd for a hockey game at the arena is 15,171, set on December 31, 2009 for a round robin game of the 2010 World Juniors between Canada and the United States; this was equalled on January 5, 2010 for the gold medal game of the tournament, which featured a re-match of the same teams.
- The largest crowd for a Saskatoon Blades game verses an out of province team is 12,588, set on February 9, 2013 in a game against the Lethbridge Hurricanes; the largest crowd for any Blades games is 14,768, first set in a game against the Regina Pats on March 19, 2023; this was equalled less than a week later on March 24 when the Blades hosted the Pats again, and then once more on April 10, 2023, for game 7 of the first round playoff series between the Blades and Pats.
- The largest crowd for a Saskatchewan Rush game is 15,192 set on May 21, 2016 in a game against the Calgary Roughnecks.

== Tenants ==
=== Current ===
Team	League	Since	Notes
Saskatoon Blades	Western Hockey League	1988	Host of the 1989 and 2013 Memorial Cups
Saskatoon Mamba	Canadian Elite Basketball League	2019	Host of the inaugural CEBL Championship Weekend; the Rattlers won the title on 25 August, 2019
Saskatchewan Rush	National Lacrosse League	2015	Won NLL Championship in their inaugural season, winning at SaskTel Centre on 4 June, 2016. Won their second NLL Championship at SaskTel Center on 9 June, 2018.

=== Former ===
Team	League	Years	Notes
Saskatchewan Storm	World Basketball League	1990–92	The WBL folded during the 1992 season
Saskatoon Slam	National Basketball League	1992–94	The NBL replaced the WBL for Canadian franchises, but itself folded in 1994
Saskatchewan Hawks	International Basketball Association, Continental Basketball Association	2000–02	The IBA folded after the 2000–01 season; the Hawks folded after the 2001–02 CBA season
Saskatoon Accelerators	Canadian Major Indoor Soccer League	2007–09	Moved to the Henk Ruys Soccer Centre for the 2010 season, after which the team folded
Saskatoon Sirens	Lingerie Football League	2012	Part of LFL Canada, which lasted only one season

=== Major tournaments and events hosted ===
Tournament/Event	Sport/Event	Year(s)
The Brier	Curling	1989; 2000; 2004; 2012
Scotties Tournament of Hearts	Curling	1991
Canadian Olympic Curling Trials	Curling	2021
Grand Slam of Curling	Curling	2008, 2019
Memorial Cup	Hockey	1989, 2013
IIHF World Junior Championship	Hockey	1991; 2010
4 Nations Cup	Hockey	2018
CHL Top Prospects Game	Hockey	1992, 2002
U Sports University Cup	Hockey	1998, 1999, 2000, 2013, 2014
Canada/Russia Super Series	Hockey	2007
Canadian Figure Skating Championships	Figure skating	1991, 2003, 2009
Canadian Ringette Championships	Ringette	1994, 2010
FIVB Volleyball Women's U21 World Championship	Volleyball	1999
CEBL Championship Weekend	Basketball	2019
Juno Awards	Music awards	2007
Warped Tour	Music festival	2008

== Gordie Howe memorial ==
A bronze statue of former Detroit Red Wings player and Saskatoon native Gordie Howe has been located outside the arena since 2005. The statue was created by Michael Martin but remained in Eston, Saskatchewan until 1993, when private donations were used to fund its completion. As city property, Saskatoon's city council rejected a proposal to place the statue outside the arena, as they felt it had no artistic value or "enduring quality." The statue would be purchased by the owners of Midtown Plaza, and installed on a street corner near the mall. The placement was criticized by a Saskatoon Star-Phoenix columnist, who felt (as per a survey the paper conducted, and an opinion from Howe himself) that the arena would be a more appropriate location for the statue. In 2005, the Gordie Howe statue was moved outside the arena's main entrance.

Following Howe's death in June 2016, the statue became a memorial site for the player. In September 2016, the cremated remains of Howe and his wife Colleen Howe were buried at the statue's base.
