= Tom Nissalke =

American basketball coach (1932–2019)

Personal information
- Born: July 7, 1932 Madison, Wisconsin, U.S.
- Died: August 22, 2019 (aged 87) Salt Lake City, Utah, U.S.

Career information
- High school: Wayland Academy (Beaver Dam, Wisconsin)
- College: Florida State (1953–1954, 1956–1957)
- Coaching career: 1957–1995

Career history

Coaching
- 1957–1962: Wayland Academy
- 1962–1963: Wisconsin (assistant)
- 1963–1968: Tulane (assistant)
- 1968–1971: Milwaukee Bucks (assistant)
- 1971–1972: Dallas Chaparrals
- 1972–1973: Seattle SuperSonics
- 1973–1974: San Antonio Spurs
- 1974–1976: Utah Stars
- 1976: Puerto Rico
- 1976–1979: Houston Rockets
- 1979–1982: Utah Jazz
- 1982–1984: Cleveland Cavaliers
- 1986–1987: Jacksonville Jets
- 1990–1991: Charlotte Hornets (assistant)
- 1992: Winnipeg Thunder
- 1994–1995: Denver Nuggets (assistant)

Career highlights
- NBA champion (1971); ABA Coach of the Year (1972); NBA Coach of the Year (1977)

Thomas Edward Nissalke (July 7, 1932 – August 22, 2019) was an American professional basketball coach in the National Basketball Association and American Basketball Association. He coached several teams in both leagues, and had an overall coaching record of 371–508.

== Early life ==
Thomas Edward Nissalke was born on July 7, 1932, in Madison, Wisconsin.

== College career ==
Nissalke attended Florida State University from 1953 to 1954, took a break, and resumed from 1956 to 1957.

== Coaching career ==
=== Wayland Academy (1957–1962) ===
Nissalke started his coaching career at Wayland Academy as the varsity boys basketball coach when he was hired by Ray Patterson, his former coach.

In 1957–58, his team finished with an overall record of 6–12 and a Conference record of 5–9.

In 1958–59, his team finished with an overall record of 13–5.

In 1959–60, his team finished with an overall record of 9–9.

In 1960–61, his team finished with an overall record of 12–5 and a Conference record of 12–2, thus ending the season as conference champions.

In 1961–62, his team finished with an overall record of 9–10.

Nissalke coached there from 1957 until 1962. He went on to the college ranks, thus advancing his career. He finished with an overall record of 49–41 at Wayland.

=== Assistant at college (1962–1971) ===
Nissalke was an assistant coach at the University of Wisconsin–Madison from 1962 to 1963. Nissalke then became an assistant at Tulane University from 1963 to 1968. Nissalke was an assistant coach with the Milwaukee Bucks of the NBA from 1968 to 1971.

=== Dallas Chaparrals (1971–1972) ===
On May 26, 1971, Nissalke was announced as the new head coach of the Dallas Chaparrals of the American Basketball Association. With an emphasis on organizations and defense, in his one season with the Chaparrals, the team started at the turn of 1972 at 15-26 but managed to rebound with 27 victories in their last 43 games to finish third place in the Western Division at 42-42 while averaging 104.3 points allowed per game after the previous season saw them give up over 120 points a game. The Chaparrals lost to the Utah Stars in four games in the first round. On April 8, 1972, Nissalke was awarded the ABA Coach of the Year Award, having received seven votes in the balloting that topped Joe Mullaney and LaDell Anderson.

However, Nissalke did not return for a second season. In an attempt to try and get a better contract, he explored options for the coaching vacancy of the Seattle SuperSonics, which expressed interest in April of 1972 to replace Lenny Wilkens (who elected to just be a player rather than player-coach). He got permission from management to speak with the Sonics, who later hired him.

=== Seattle SuperSonics (1972–1973) ===
On April 21, 1972, Nissalke was hired by Seattle. Nissalke moved to the NBA with the Sonics for one season. It was Nissalke who expressed a desire to trade Lenny Wilkens to the Cleveland Cavaliers. The Sonics fired Nissalke on January 10, 1973 after winning just 13 of 45 games; he was replaced by Bucky Buckwalter.

=== San Antonio Spurs (1973–1974) ===
After leaving Seattle, Nissalke returned to his former ABA franchise, which had since left Dallas for San Antonio and become the Spurs. During his tenure, the "Iceman" George Gervin had arrived from the Virginia Squires and was the center of the team. Though Nissalke's club was successful, he was fired on December 14, 1974 and replaced by Bob Bass for the remainder of the 1974–75 ABA season.

Nissalke's deliberate style of play irked certain people, with Spurs announcer Terry Stembridge stating that it was "the most boring basketball known to mankind", regardless if the team won or not.

=== Utah Stars (1974–1976) ===
Nissalke then went to Utah with the ABA's Stars, but the club folded, surprisingly, at mid-season in the ABA's last hurrah in 1975–76. According to Remember the ABA, he has the final game ball in his closet.

=== Puerto Rico (1976) ===
Nissalke was the coach of Puerto Rico at the 1976 Summer Olympics in Montreal, finishing in 9th place with a 2–5 record. Nissalke's squad came close to upsetting the United States, losing by a 94–93 score.

=== Houston Rockets (1976–1979) ===
Nissalke succeeded Johnny Egan as Houston Rockets head coach on April 20, 1976. He won the NBA Coach of the Year Award for the 1976–77 season, in which the Rockets went 49-33 and narrowly won their first division championship before losing to the Philadelphia 76ers in six games of the Eastern Conference Finals. They regressed heavily in their second season with 28 wins before the next season saw them reach the playoffs and lose in a sweep to the Hawks. Nissalke was not retained and replaced by Del Harris.

=== Utah Jazz (1979–1982) ===
Nissalke was the first coach of the newly-christened Utah Jazz from 1979 to 1982. The Jazz had shooting great Pete Maravich, but he was plagued by knee injuries. Maravich played just 17 games but his injuries prevented him from practicing on a substantial level. It was Nissalke that had a strict rule that players who did not practice were not allowed to play in games. Due to this rule, Maravich was put on the bench for 24 straight games, which both Maravich and the fans hated; Maravich was waived and later signed with the Boston Celtics, where he finished out his last season. Utah finished dead last in their division in 1979-80 before finishing 5th in the following year, narrowly above the expansion team Dallas Mavericks. Twenty games into the 1981-82 season, Nissalke was fired.

=== Cleveland Cavaliers (1982–1984) ===
Nissalke coached the Cleveland Cavaliers from 1982 to 1984.

=== Jacksonville Jets (1986–1987) ===
Nissalke coached the Jacksonville Jets from 1986 to 1987.

=== Winding down ===
Nissalke was an assistant coach with the Charlotte Hornets from 1990 to 1991. He then coached the Winnipeg Thunder of the World Basketball League from 1991 to 1992. Nissalke closed out his career as an assistant for the Denver Nuggets from 1994 to 1995.

== Legacy ==
Nissalke holds the rare distinction of being named "Coach of the Year" in both the NBA and the ABA. He was also the commissioner of the short-lived National Basketball League in Canada in 1993–94. He had a combined coaching record of 371–508 (248–391 in NBA and 123–117 in ABA), with an 11–20 playoff record. He went 105–91 with the Chaparrals/Spurs, 13–32 with the Sonics, 18–26 with the Utah Stars, 124–122 with the Rockets, 60–124 with the Jazz, and 51–113 with the Cavaliers. He made it out of the first round of the playoffs just once, in 1977.

== Post-coaching career ==
After his coaching career, Nissalke took on revamping the YMCA of Utah and served as chairman of the board and later interim CEO. The YMCA had its most successful fundraising campaigns during his tenure. He also served as a radio analyst for Jazz games.

== Head coaching record ==
Legend
Regular season	G	Games coached	W	Games won	L	Games lost	W–L %	Win–loss %
Playoffs	PG	Playoff games	PW	Playoff wins	PL	Playoff losses	PW–L %	Playoff win–loss %

Team	Year	G	W	L	W–L%	Finish	PG	PW	PL	PW–L%	Result
Dallas*	1971–72	84	42	42	.500	3rd in Western	4	0	4	.000	Lost in Div. Semifinals
Seattle	1972–73	45	13	32	.289	(fired)	–	–	–	–	–
San Antonio*	1973–74	84	45	39	.536	3rd in Western	7	3	4	.429	Lost in Div. Semifinals
San Antonio*	1974–75	28	18	10	.643	(resigned)	–	–	–	–	–
Utah*	1974–75	28	14	14	.500	4th in Western	6	2	4	.333	Lost in Div. Semifinals
Utah*	1975–76	16	4	12	.250	(folded)	–	–	–	–	–
Houston	1976–77	82	49	33	.598	1st in Central	12	6	6	.500	Lost in Conf. Finals
Houston	1977–78	82	28	54	.341	6th in Central	–	–	–	–	Missed Playoffs
Houston	1978–79	82	47	35	.573	2nd in Central	2	0	2	.000	Lost in First Round
Utah	1979–80	82	24	58	.293	5th in Midwest	–	–	–	–	Missed Playoffs
Utah	1980–81	82	28	54	.341	5th in Midwest	–	–	–	–	Missed Playoffs
Utah	1981–82	20	8	12	.400	(fired)	–	–	–	–	–
Cleveland	1982–83	82	23	59	.280	5th in Central	–	–	–	–	Missed Playoffs
Cleveland	1983–84	82	28	54	.341	4th in Central	–	–	–	–	Missed Playoffs
Career		879	371	508	.422		31	11	20	.355	

== Personal life ==
Nissalke's entrepreneurial activities included developing and owning several health clubs throughout Texas in addition to co-owning a successful bar and restaurant, Green Street in Salt Lake City, Utah for over twenty years.

In January 2006, his wife of 46 years, Nancy, who also was a native of Madison, Wisconsin, died, succumbing to cancer. Together they had two children and two granddaughters.

On August 22, 2019, Nissalke died at his home in Salt Lake City, Utah.

Preceded by Bucky Buckwalter	Utah Stars head coach 1975–1976	Succeeded by Team folded
