= Cape Breton Breakers =

Canadian basketball team

- Founded: 1993
- Folded: 1994
- Arena: Centre 200
- Location: Cape Breton, Nova Scotia

The Cape Breton Breakers were a franchise in the National Basketball League that began play in 1993, the league's first season. The team played their home games at Centre 200, in Sydney, which was also home of the Cape Breton Oilers.

The team won their first ever game on May 1, 1993, 98-94 over their provincial rival, the Halifax Windjammers, at the Halifax Metro Centre. They went on to win the league's regular season championship with a record of 30-16. They defeated the Edmonton Skyhawks, three games to none in the semi-finals before losing to the Saskatoon Slam, three games to one in the championship series. All games in the finals were played in Saskatoon, due to travel costs. During that first season, Lee Campbell won the league's MVP and scoring championship.

The following season there were rumours that the team would be relocated to Saint John, New Brunswick, which did not materialize before the league folded on July 9. The Breakers had a record of 11-10 at the time, their record was good for third place in the six team league.

== Season by season record ==
Season	GP	W	L	Pct.	GB	Finish	Playoffs
1993	46	30	16	.652	–	1st NBL	Won NBL Semi Finals 3–0 Vs Edmonton Skyhawks, Lost WBL Championship Series 3–1 Vs Saskatoon Slam
1994	21	11	10	.524	4	3rd NBL	None, League Disbands prior to the end of the season on July 9, 1994
Totals	67	41	26	.612	–	–	Playoff record 4–3

== Sources ==
- NBL Statistics
