= Florida Jades =

- League: World Basketball League
- Founded: 1991
- Folded: 1992
- History: Florida Jades; 1991–1992
- Arena: Florida Atlantic University Arena
- Capacity: 3,161
- Location: Boca Raton, Florida
- Head coach: Matt Creamer
- Ownership: Gary Rice

The Florida Jades were a professional basketball franchise based in Boca Raton, Florida from 1991 to 1992. The team played its inaugural season in the World Basketball League, which folded before the schedule ended. Notable players include Guard Tracy Moore.

The Jades played its home games at the Florida Atlantic University Arena.

== Personnel ==
Head Coaches

- Matt Creamer

== Season by season record ==
Season	GP	W	L	Pct.	GB	Finish	Playoffs
1991	51	30	21	.588	6	2nd WBL Southern	Won WBL First Round 2–1 Vs Memphis Rockers, Lost WBL Semi Finals 2–0 Vs Dayton Wings
1992	19	9	10	.474	–	8th WBL	None, Florida Jades disbanded 15 June 1992
Totals	70	39	31	.557	–	–	Playoff Record 2–3

== Sources ==
- World Basketball League
