= Hamilton Skyhawks =

Canadian basketball team

- League: World Basketball League (1992); National Basketball League (1993)
- Founded: 1992
- History: Hamilton Skyhawks (1992–1993); Edmonton Skyhawks (1993–1994)
- Arena: Copps Coliseum
- Capacity: 17,000
- Location: Hamilton, Ontario
- Ownership: Ron Foxcroft (1992) Ted Stepien (1993)

The Hamilton Skyhawks were a Canadian professional Basketball Team based in Hamilton, Ontario formed in 1992.

They were a professional basketball franchise based in Hamilton, Ontario that played in the World Basketball League and the National Basketball League in 1992 and 1993. The team joined the WBL as an expansion team for the 1992 season. However, the WBL folded before completion of that season. Some of the Canadian WBL teams, including the Skyhawks, formed their own league for 1993 called the National Basketball League. The Skyhawks did not complete that season either, moving to Edmonton, Alberta before the 1993 NBL playoffs.

The Skyhawks home court was the Copps Coliseum.

== Personnel ==
Head coach

- Kevin Billerman

== Season by season record ==
WBL

Season	GP	W	L	Pct.	GB	Finish	Playoffs
1992	34	17	17	.500	9.5	5th WBL	WBL folds before end of season
Totals	34	17	17	.500	–	–	Playoff Record 0–0

NBL

Season	GP	W	L	Pct.	GB	Finish	Playoffs
1993	46	24	22	.522	6	4th NBL	Made the playoffs but relocated to Edmonton prior to the playoffs to become the Edmonton Skyhawks
Totals	46	24	22	.522	–	–	0–0

== Sources ==
- WBL Statistics
- NBL Statistics
