= Edmonton Skyhawks =

Former Canadian basketball team

- League: National Basketball League
- Founded: 1993
- Folded: 1994
- History: Hamilton Skyhawks (1992–1993) Edmonton Skyhawks (1993–1994)
- Arena: Northlands Coliseum
- Location: Edmonton, Alberta
- Ownership: Nestor Pistor, Barry Kryba

The Edmonton Skyhawks were a professional basketball franchise based in Edmonton, Alberta that played in 1993 and 1994. The Skyhawks were members of the National Basketball League. The team moved to Edmonton from Hamilton, Ontario for the 1993 playoffs. It remained in Edmonton for the 1994 season, which saw the league fold before the schedule ended.

The Skyhawks played their games at Northlands Coliseum.

== Season by season record ==
Season	GP	W	L	Pct.	GB	Finish	Playoffs
1993 (Note: Played season as the Hamilton Skyhawks and relocated to Edmonton Prior to the playoffs starting.)	46	24	22	.522	6	4th NBL	Lost NBL Semi Finals 3–0 Vs Cape Breton Breakers
1994	24	10	14	.417	6.5	5th NBL	League folds July 9, 1994
Totals	24	10	14	.417	–	–	Playoff Record 0–3

== Sources ==
- NBL Statistics
