= Saskatoon Slam =

- League: National Basketball League
- Established: 1990
- Folded: 1994
- History: Saskatchewan Storm (WBL) (1990–1992); Saskatoon Slam (NBL) (1992–1994)
- Arena: Saskatchewan Place
- Location: Saskatoon, Saskatchewan
- Team colours
- Championships: 1 (1993)

The Saskatoon Slam were a Canadian professional basketball franchise based in Saskatoon, Saskatchewan, that played in the National Basketball League in 1993 and 1994.

== Team history ==
=== Saskatchewan Storm (WBL) ===
The Slam were founded in 1990 as the Saskatchewan Storm of the World Basketball League (WBL). On May 11, 1990 The Storm narrowly lost their first game, 117–115 against the Las Vegas Silver Streaks, in front of a record crowd of more than 8,000. The team did not win a championship but had some notable alumni, including Thomas Lyles, the father of Sacramento Kings player Trey Lyles, and current UC Davis Aggies men's basketball coach Jim Les. The WBL folded before the conclusion of the 1992 season, and the Canadian franchises opted to create a new national league, the National Basketball League (NBL). It was then that the Storm changed their name to the Saskatoon Slam.

=== Saskatoon Slam (NBL) ===
The Slam were a success in the only full NBL season. On 8 September 1993, they defeated the Cape Breton Breakers by a score of 109–107 in the fourth game of the championship final to win the league title. This was the province's first professional basketball championship, and the only one until the Saskatchewan Rattlers won the inaugural Canadian Elite Basketball League title in 2019.

The NBL struggled financially–for example, all games of the 1993 finals were played in Saskatoon to reduce travel costs–and the league folded in the middle of the 1994 season, along with the Slam. This left the city and province without professional basketball until briefly hosting the Saskatchewan Hawks, from 2000 to 2002.

== Season-by-season results ==
= Indicates League Championship

Legend: GP = Games played, W = Wins, L = Losses, GBL = Games Behind Leader

=== Saskatchewan Storm (WBL) ===
Season	GP	W	L	Pct.	GBL	Finish	Playoffs
1990	46	19	27	.413	19	6th	Lost first-round to Las Vegas Silver Streaks, 2–0
1991	51	25	26	.490	12	6th	Won first-round over Youngstown Pride, 2–0 Lost semi-final to Calgary 88's, 2–0
1992	33	12	21	.364	14	7th	None–League folded on 1 August 1992
Totals	130	56	74	.431			2-4 playoff record

=== Saskatoon Slam (NBL) ===
Season	Coach	GP	W	L	Pct.	GBL	Finish	Playoffs
1993	Bill Klucas	46	25	21	.544	5	3rd	Won semi-final over Winnipeg Thunder 3–2, Won finals over Cape Breton Breakers 3–1
1994	Bill Klucas	23	10	13	.435	6	4th	None–League folded on 9 July 1994
Totals		69	35	34	.507	-	-	Playoff record 6-3

== All-time Slam roster ==
Name	Number	Position	Height	Weight	Date of birth	Current/last known team
Alex Blackwell	11	F	6'7	257		CD Universidad de Los Lagos (Chile) (2011)
Fred Cofield	4	G	6'3	190	January 4, 1962	Barangay Ginebra (Philippines) (1997)
Gary Collier		G			October 8, 1971	
Mario Donaldson	34	G/F	6'4	195		Marinos de Anzotegui (Venezuela) (2001)
Jerome Gaines	1	G	6'4	190		
Angelo Hamilton	23	G/F	6'5	200		Dart Killester (Ireland) (2002)
Richard Lovelace	23	G	6'6	200		Brandon Bobcats (CIS) (1999)
Roy Marble	30	F	6'6	190	December 13, 1966	
Brian Martin		F	6'9	212	August 18, 1962	
Jared Miller	45	F	6'8	225		Porto Ferpinta (Portugal) (2000)
James Moses						
Darren Morningstar	50	C	6'10	235	April 22, 1969	Grand Rapids Hoops (CBA) (1999)
Michael Sims	1	G	5'11	170		
McKinley Singleton	5	G	6'4	195	October 29, 1961	
John Spencer	44	F	6'8	233		CBA] (Sichuan China) (1998)
Greg Sutton	20	G	6'2	170	December 3, 1967	Proteus DaNoi AEL (Cyprus) (2002)
Troy Truvillion	20	G	6'4	185		Basket Club Maritime Gravelines Dunkerque Grand Littoral (France) (2001)
Sean Tyson	22	F	6'7	220		Winnipeg Cyclone (IBA)
Dean Wiebe	34	G/F	6'4	195		
Erik Wilson	55	C	7'0	235		Defensor Sporting Club (Uruguay) (2001)
