= Dayton Wings (basketball team) =

- Division: Southern Division
- League: World Basketball League (1991–1992)
- Founded: 1991
- Dissolved: July 31, 1992
- History: Dayton Wings; 1991–1992
- Arena: Ervin J. Nutter Center
- Capacity: 10,632
- Location: Dayton, Ohio
- Team colors: Blue & green
- Head coach: Pat Haley (1991); Mike Sylvester (1992)
- Ownership: Milton Kantor
- Championships: 2 (1991) (1992)
- Division titles: 1 (1991)

The Dayton Wings were a professional basketball franchise based in Dayton, Ohio, from 1991–1992. They entered the World Basketball League in 1991 as an expansion team (along with the Florida Jades, Halifax Windjammers and Nashville Stars). They finished the 1991 season as the WBL champions, defeating Calgary in the final. They were leading the Southern Division in 1992 when the league folded mid-season.

The Wings played home games at the Ervin J. Nutter Center in Fairborn, a suburb of Dayton.

== Season by season record ==
Season	GP	W	L	Pct.	GB	Finish	Playoffs
1991	51	36	15	.706	–	1st WBL Southern Division	WBL First Round BYE, Won WBL Semi Final 2–0 Vs Florida Jades, Won WBL Championship 3–0 Vs Calgary 88's
1992	33	26	7	.788	–	1st WBL	League disbanded, Wings declared Champions
Totals	84	62	22	.738	–		Two Championships
