= Calgary Outlaws (basketball) =

Canadian basketball franchise (1994)

- League: National Basketball League
- Founded: 1994
- Folded: 1994
- Arena: Jack Simpson Gymnasium
- Capacity: 3,454
- Location: Calgary, Alberta

The Calgary Outlaws were a professional basketball franchise based in Calgary, Alberta. They were active for one season in 1994. The Outlaws were members of the National Basketball League.

The Outlaws played its home games at the Jack Simpson Gymnasium at the University of Calgary.

== Season by season record ==
Season	GP	W	L	Pct.	GB	Finish	Playoffs
1994	24	13	11	.542	3.5	2nd NBL	None, League Disbanded prior to the end of the season on July 9, 1994
Totals	24	13	11	.542	–	–	Playoff record 0–0
