= Halifax Windjammers =

- Leagues: World Basketball League (1991–1992); National Basketball League (1993–1994)
- History: Halifax Windjammers (1991–1994)
- Arena: Halifax Metro Centre
- Location: Halifax, Nova Scotia
- Ownership: Walter Newton, Leo Arkelian, Roland Jung, Boyd Lutz, Michael Doyle, et al.
- Championships: 1 (1994)
- Conference titles: 1 (1994)

The Halifax Windjammers were a franchise in the World Basketball League that began play in 1991. The team continued operation after the WBL folded in 1992, when they joined the newly formed National Basketball League. The NBL folded midway through the 1994 season, when the Windjammers were in first place. The team played their home games at the Halifax Metro Centre.

The most famous player to ever suit up for the 'Jammers was Keith Smart, who scored the game winning basket in the 1987 NCAA championship game. Milt Newton won the 1991 WBL Slam Dunk contest as a member of the Windjammers while Willie Bland led the league in rebounding in the same year (at 12.3 per game).

Nova Scotian Kevin Veinot had also played on the Halifax Windjammers basketball team. He played post position and was very strong. He was one of the best players to ever play for the Halifax Windjammers. He was number 33.

The 'Jammers were coached by Ian MacMillan in 1991. Mickey Fox then took over, being their coach for the 1991 and 1992 seasons.

== Season-by-season record ==
Season	GP	W	L	Pct.	GB	Standing	Playoffs
1991	51	21	30	.412	16	4th WBL Northern Division	DNQ
1992	33	19	14	.576	7	4th WBL	League folded August 1
1993	46	20	26	.435	10	5th NBL	DNQ
1994	21	15	6	.714	-	1st NBL	League folded July 9 and were declared Champions
Totals	151	75	76	.497			0-0

== See also ==
- Sports teams in the Halifax Regional Municipality
