= National Basketball League (Canada) =

Canadian professional basketball league

The National Basketball League was a professional basketball league based in Canada that lasted only one and a half seasons in 1993 and 1994. It rose from the ashes of the World Basketball League (WBL), which folded after the 1992 season, and had teams in various Canadian and American cities; the new league combined several former WBL teams based in Canada and new franchises. The NBL's first game was played on May 1, 1993, when the Cape Breton Breakers visited the Halifax Windjammers. The Breakers won the regular season championship with a 30–16 record, but lost the championship finals to Saskatoon three games to one.

During the 1994 season there were rumours that the Cape Breton team was going to move to Saint John mid-season, which never happened before the league folded on July 9, 1994. Halifax, which finished last in 1993, was in first place at the time the league folded.

The league's president was Sam Katz and its commissioner was Tom Nissalke.

== Teams ==
Team	City	Arena	Established	Folded	Notes
Calgary Outlaws	Calgary, Alberta	Jack Simpson Gymnasium (University of Calgary); Olympic Saddledome	1994	1994	Expansion team
Cape Breton Breakers	Sydney, Nova Scotia	Centre 200	1993	1994	Expansion team
Halifax Windjammers	Halifax, Nova Scotia	Halifax Metro Centre	1993	1994	Holdover from the WBL
Edmonton Skyhawks	Edmonton, Alberta	Northlands Coliseum	1993	1994 (start of playoffs)	Team relocated from Hamilton
Hamilton Skyhawks	Hamilton, Ontario	Copps Coliseum	1993	1993	Holdover from the WBL, moved to Edmonton
Montreal Dragons	Montreal, Quebec	Verdun Auditorium	1993	1993	Expansion team
Saskatoon Slam	Saskatoon, Saskatchewan	Saskatchewan Place	1993	1994	Holdover from WBL. Ownership changed the name of the franchise in the new league. Originally known as the “Saskatchewan Storm” in the WBL.
Winnipeg Thunder	Winnipeg, Manitoba	Winnipeg Arena	1993	1994	Holdover from the WBL

== Season-by-season records ==
=== 1993 ===
1993 NATIONAL BASKETBALL LEAGUE
TEAM	GP	W	L	PCT	GB
Cape Breton Breakers	46	30	16	.652	-
Winnipeg Thunder	46	29	17	.630	1
Saskatoon Slam	46	25	21	.543	5
Hamilton Skyhawks	46	24	22	.522	6
Halifax Windjammers	46	20	26	.435	10
Montreal Dragons	17	11	6	.647	
Canadian National Team	24	9	13	.409	
ACC All-Stars	6	1	5	.167	
Big East All-Stars	6	0	6	.000	
Athletes in Action	7	0	7	.000	

- Montréal Dragons folded in mid-season on June 10, 1993
- Hamilton Skyhawks transferred to Edmonton prior to the start of the playoffs

PLAYOFFS - SEMI-FINALS

- Cape Breton defeated Edmonton 2 games to 1; Saskatoon defeated Winnipeg 2 games to 1

FINALS

- Saskatoon defeated Cape Breton 3 games to 1

==== Touring teams ====
In 1993, league teams also played games against some touring teams which counted in the league standings. These teams were:

- Atlantic Coast Conference All-Stars (replaced Atlantic 10 All-Stars)
- Athletes in Action
- Big East All-Stars
- Canadian National Team

=== 1994 ===
1994 NATIONAL BASKETBALL LEAGUE
TEAM	GP	W	L	PCT	GB
Halifax Windjammers	21	15	6	.714	-
Calgary Outlaws	24	13	11	.542	3½
Cape Breton Breakers	21	11	10	.524	4
Saskatoon Slam	23	10	13	.435	6
Edmonton Skyhawks	24	10	14	.417	6½
Winnipeg Thunder	25	10	15	.400	7

- National Basketball League disbanded on July 9, 1994

== League champions ==
Year	Winner	Runner up	Result
1993	Saskatoon Slam	Cape Breton Breakers	3-1 Series win
1994	Halifax Windjammers	Calgary Outlaws	Declared champions due to folding mid-season
