= 1985–86 NCAA Division I men's basketball season =

Basketball season

- Preseason AP No. 1: Georgia Tech Yellow Jackets
- NCAA Tournament: 1986
- Tournament dates: March 13 – 31, 1986
- National Championship: Reunion Arena; Dallas, Texas
- NCAA Champions: Louisville Cardinals
- Other champions: Ohio State Buckeyes (NIT)
- Player of the Year (Naismith, Wooden): Johnny Dawkins, Duke Blue Devils (Naismith); Walter Berry, St. John's Redmen (Wooden)

== Season headlines ==
- The Big South Conference began conference play. It had been founded in 1983, but its members had played as Division I independents until this season.
- The ECAC South renamed itself the Colonial Athletic Association. It renamed itself the Coastal Athletic Association in 2023.
- The Midwestern City Conference renamed itself the Midwestern Collegiate Conference. It renamed itself the Horizon League in 2001.
- Blocked shots and steals both became official statistics tracked by the NCAA. David Robinson of Navy became the first national blocked shot champion, averaging 5.91 per game for the season. The first steals champion was Darron Brittman of Chicago State, with 4.96 per game.
- LSU, seeded 11th in the 1986 NCAA tournament's Southeast Region, became the first team with a double-digit seed to advance to the Final Four.

== Major rule changes ==
Beginning in 1985–86, the following rules changes were implemented:

- The 45-second shot clock was introduced.
- With the shot clock's introduction, the so-called "lack of action" count (when the offense fails to attempt a shot in a five-second timeframe) was abolished.
- If a shooter was fouled intentionally and the shot was missed, the penalty was two shots and possession of the ball out of bounds to the team who was fouled.
- Conferences were permitted to experiment with a three-point field goal, provided the distance was set to at least 19 feet 9 inches (6.02 metres) from the center of the basket.

== Season outlook ==
=== Pre-season polls ===
The top 20 from the AP Poll during the pre-season.

Associated Press
Ranking	Team
1	Georgia Tech (28)
2	North Carolina (13)
3	Michigan (13)
4	Syracuse
5	Kansas (4)
6	Duke (2)
7	Illinois
8	Georgetown (1)
9	Louisville
10	Auburn
11	Kentucky
12	Notre Dame
13	Oklahoma
14	Louisiana State
15	Memphis State
16	Alabama-Birmingham
17	NC State
18	UNLV
19	Maryland
19	Navy

UPI Coaches
Ranking	Team
1	Michigan
2	Georgia Tech
3	North Carolina
4	Kansas
5	Duke
6	Syracuse
7	Illinois
8	Georgetown
9	Louisiana State
10	Louisville
11	Auburn
12	Kentucky
13	Notre Dame
14	Iowa
14	NC State
16	Alabama-Birmingham
17	Washington
18	UNLV
19	DePaul
20	UCLA

== Conference membership changes ==
School	Former conference	New conference
Armstrong Atlantic State Pirates	Division II independent	Big South Conference
Augusta State Jaguars	Division I independent	Big South Conference
Baptist Buccaneers	Division I independent	Big South Conference
Campbell Fighting Camels	Division I independent	Big South Conference
Coastal Carolina Chanticleers	NAIA independent	Big South Conference
Coppin State Eagles	NAIA independent	Mid-Eastern Athletic Conference
Miami (Fla.) Hurricanes	No team	Division I independent
Monmouth Hawks	Division I independent	ECAC Metro
Oklahoma City Chiefs	Midwestern City Conference	Sooner Athletic Conference (NAIA)
Radford Highlanders	Division I independent	Big South Conference
San Francisco Dons	No team	West Coast Athletic Conference
Stetson Hatters	Division I independent	Trans America Athletic Conference
Tulane Green Wave	Metro Conference	No team
UNC Asheville Bulldogs	NAIA independent	Big South Conference
Winthrop Eagles	NAIA independent	Big South Conference

NOTES: The Big South Conference was founded in 1983, but its members played as independents until this season. Tulane discontinued its men's basketball program after the 1984–85 season in response to a point shaving scandal involving four of its players.

== Regular season ==
=== Conferences ===
==== Conference winners and tournaments ====
Conference	Regular season winner	Conference player of the year	Conference Coach of the Year	Conference tournament	Tournament venue (City)	Tournament winner
AMCU–8	Cleveland State	Jon Collins, Eastern Illinois	Kevin Mackey, Cleveland State	1986 AMCU-8 men's basketball tournament	Hammons Student Center (Springfield, Missouri)	Cleveland State
Atlantic 10 Conference	Saint Joseph's	Maurice Martin, Saint Joseph's	Jim Boyle, Saint Joseph's	1986 Atlantic 10 men's basketball tournament	Brendan Byrne Arena (East Rutherford, New Jersey)	Saint Joseph's
Atlantic Coast Conference	Duke	Len Bias, Maryland	Mike Krzyzewski, Duke	1986 ACC men's basketball tournament	Greensboro Coliseum (Greensboro, North Carolina)	Duke
Big East Conference	St. John's & Syracuse	Walter Berry, St. John's	Lou Carnesecca, St. John's	1986 Big East men's basketball tournament	Madison Square Garden (New York City, New York)	St. John's
Big Eight Conference	Kansas	Danny Manning, Kansas	Larry Brown, Kansas	1986 Big Eight Conference men's basketball tournament	Kemper Arena (Kansas City, Missouri) (Semifinals and Finals)	Kansas
Big Sky Conference	Montana & Northern Arizona	Larry Krystkowiak, Montana	Stu Starner, Montana State	1986 Big Sky Conference men's basketball tournament	Lawlor Events Center (Reno, Nevada)	Montana State
Big South Conference	Baptist	Fred McKinnon, Winthrop	Tommy Gaither, Baptist	1986 Big South Conference men's basketball tournament	Savannah Civic Center (Savannah, Georgia)	Baptist
Big Ten Conference	Michigan	None Selected	Jud Heathcote, Michigan State	No Tournament		
Colonial Athletic Association	Navy	David Robinson, Navy	Dick Tarrant, Richmond	1986 CAA men's basketball tournament	Patriot Center (Fairfax, Virginia)	Navy
East Coast Conference	Drexel	Michael Anderson, Drexel	Edward Burke, Drexel	1986 East Coast Conference men's basketball tournament	Towson Center (Towson, Maryland)	Drexel
ECAC Metro	Fairleigh Dickinson	Terrance Bailey, Wagner	Tom Green, Fairleigh Dickinson	1986 ECAC Metro men's basketball tournament	William T. Boylan Gymnasium (West Long Branch, New Jersey)	Marist
ECAC North	Northeastern	Reggie Lewis, Northeastern	Jim Calhoun, Northeastern	1986 ECAC North men's basketball tournament	Matthews Arena (Boston, Massachusetts)	Northeastern
Ivy League	Brown	Jim Turner, Brown	None selected	No Tournament		
Metro Atlantic Athletic Conference	Fairfield	Tony George, Fairfield	Mitch Buonaguro, Fairfield	1986 MAAC men's basketball tournament	Meadowlands Arena (East Rutherford, New Jersey)	Fairfield
Metro Conference	Louisville	Dell Curry, Virginia Tech	M. K. Turk, Southern Miss	1986 Metro Conference men's basketball tournament	Freedom Hall (Louisville, Kentucky)	Louisville
Mid-American Conference	Miami (OH)	Ron Harper, Miami (OH)	Jerry Peirson, Miami (OH)	1986 MAC men's basketball tournament	Rockford MetroCentre (Rockford, Illinois)	Ball State
Mid-Eastern Athletic Conference	North Carolina A&T	Don Hill, Bethune–Cookman	Don Corbett, North Carolina A&T	1986 MEAC men's basketball tournament	Philadelphia Civic Center (Philadelphia, Pennsylvania)	North Carolina A&T
Midwestern Collegiate Conference	Xavier	Byron Larkin, Xavier	Pete Gillen, Xavier & Don Sicko, Detroit	1986 Midwestern Collegiate Conference men's basketball tournament	Market Square Arena (Indianapolis, Indiana)	Xavier
Missouri Valley Conference	Bradley	Jim Les, Bradley	Dick Versace, Bradley	1986 Missouri Valley Conference men's basketball tournament	Tulsa Convention Center (Tulsa, Oklahoma)	Tulsa
Ohio Valley Conference	Akron & Middle Tennessee State	Marcel Boyce, Akron	Bob Huggins, Akron	1986 Ohio Valley Conference men's basketball tournament	James A. Rhodes Arena (Akron, Ohio)	Akron
Pacific-10 Conference	Arizona	Chris Welp, Washington	Lute Olson, Arizona	No Tournament		
Pacific Coast Athletic Association	UNLV	Greg Grant, Utah State & Anthony Jones, UNLV	Bill Mulligan, UC Irvine	1986 Pacific Coast Athletic Association men's basketball tournament	The Forum (Inglewood, California)	UNLV
Southeastern Conference	Kentucky	Kenny Walker, Kentucky	Eddie Sutton, Kentucky	1986 SEC men's basketball tournament	Rupp Arena (Lexington, Kentucky)	Kentucky
Southern Conference	Tennessee–Chattanooga	Gay Elmore, VMI	Mack McCarthy, Tennessee–Chattanooga	1986 Southern Conference men's basketball tournament	Asheville Civic Center (Asheville, North Carolina)	Davidson
Southland Conference	Northeast Louisiana	Bobby Jenkins, Northeast Louisiana	Mike Vining, Northeast Louisiana	1986 Southland Conference men's basketball tournament	Fant–Ewing Coliseum (Monroe, Louisiana)	Northeast Louisiana
Southwest Conference	TCU, Texas & Texas A&M	John Brownlee, Texas	Jim Killingsworth, TCU	1986 Southwest Conference men's basketball tournament	Reunion Arena (Dallas, Texas)	Texas Tech
Southwestern Athletic Conference	Alcorn State & Southern	Frank Sillmon, Alabama State	Davey Whitney, Alcorn State	1986 SWAC men's basketball tournament		Mississippi Valley State
Sun Belt Conference	Old Dominion	Kenny Gattison, Old Dominion	Clem Haskins, Western Kentucky & Tom Young, Old Dominion	1986 Sun Belt Conference men's basketball tournament	Birmingham–Jefferson Convention Complex (Birmingham, Alabama)	Jacksonville
Trans America Athletic Conference	Arkansas–Little Rock	Myron Jackson, Arkansas–Little Rock	Mike Newell, Arkansas–Little Rock	1986 TAAC men's basketball tournament	Barton Coliseum (Little Rock, Arkansas)	Arkansas–Little Rock
West Coast Athletic Conference	Pepperdine	Dwayne Polee, Pepperdine	Hank Egan, San Diego & Jim Harrick, Pepperdine	No Tournament		
Western Athletic Conference	Utah, UTEP & Wyoming	Anthony Watson, San Diego State	Jim Brandenburg, Wyoming	1986 WAC men's basketball tournament	Arena-Auditorium (Laramie, Wyoming)	UTEP

==== Conference standings ====
1985–86 AMCU-8 Conference men's basketball standings
	Conf.				Overall
Team	W		L	PCT	W		L	PCT
Cleveland State †	13	–	1	.929	29	–	4	.879
Southwest Missouri State	10	–	4	.714	24	–	8	.750
Eastern Illinois	8	–	6	.571	19	–	13	.594
Western Illinois	7	–	7	.500	13	–	15	.464
Illinois–Chicago	7	–	7	.500	13	–	16	.448
Valparaiso	5	–	9	.357	9	–	19	.321
Wisconsin–Green Bay	3	–	11	.214	5	–	23	.179
Northern Iowa	3	–	11	.214	8	–	19	.296
† 1986 AMCU-8 tournament winner

1985–86 ACC men's basketball standings
	Conf.				Overall
Team	W		L	PCT	W		L	PCT
No. 1 Duke†	12	–	2	.857	37	–	3	.925
No. 6 Georgia Tech	11	–	3	.786	27	–	7	.794
No. 8 North Carolina	10	–	4	.714	28	–	6	.824
NC State	7	–	7	.500	21	–	13	.618
Virginia	7	–	7	.500	19	–	11	.633
Maryland	6	–	8	.429	19	–	14	.576
Clemson	3	–	11	.214	19	–	15	.559
Wake Forest	0	–	14	.000	8	–	21	.276
† 1986 ACC tournament winner Rankings from AP Poll

1985–86 Atlantic 10 men's basketball standings
	Conf.				Overall
Team	W		L	PCT	W		L	PCT
Saint Joseph's†	16	–	2	.889	26	–	6	.813
West Virginia	15	–	3	.833	22	–	11	.667
Temple	15	–	3	.833	25	–	6	.806
St. Bonaventure	10	–	8	.556	15	–	13	.536
Duquesne	9	–	9	.500	15	–	14	.517
George Washington	7	–	11	.389	12	–	16	.429
UMass	6	–	12	.333	9	–	9	.500
Rhode Island	5	–	13	.278	9	–	19	.321
Penn State	5	–	13	.278	12	–	17	.414
Rutgers	2	–	16	.111	8	–	21	.276
† 1986 Atlantic 10 Tournament winner Rankings from AP Poll

1985–86 Big East men's basketball standings
	Conf.				Overall
Team	W		L	PCT	W		L	PCT
No. 4 St. John's †	14	–	2	.875	31	–	5	.861
No. 9 Syracuse	14	–	2	.875	26	–	6	.813
No. 13 Georgetown	11	–	5	.688	24	–	8	.750
Villanova	10	–	6	.625	23	–	14	.622
Providence	7	–	9	.438	17	–	14	.548
Pittsburgh	6	–	10	.375	15	–	14	.517
Boston College	4	–	12	.250	13	–	15	.464
Connecticut	3	–	13	.188	12	–	16	.429
Seton Hall	3	–	13	.188	14	–	18	.438
† 1986 Big East tournament winner As of March 31, 1986; Rankings from AP Poll

1985–86 Big Eight Conference men's basketball standings
	Conf.				Overall
Team	W		L	PCT	W		L	PCT
No. 2 Kansas †	13	–	1	.929	35	–	4	.897
Iowa State	9	–	5	.643	22	–	11	.667
Nebraska	8	–	6	.571	19	–	11	.633
Missouri	8	–	6	.571	21	–	14	.600
No. 15 Oklahoma	8	–	6	.571	26	–	9	.743
Oklahoma State	6	–	8	.429	15	–	13	.536
Kansas State	4	–	10	.286	16	–	14	.533
Colorado	0	–	14	.000	8	–	20	.286
† 1986 Big Eight tournament winner As of March 31, 1986; Rankings from AP Poll

1985–86 Big Sky Conference men's basketball standings
	Conf.				Overall
Team	W		L	PCT	W		L	PCT
Northern Arizona	9	–	5	.643	19	–	10	.655
Montana	9	–	5	.643	21	–	11	.656
Idaho State	8	–	6	.571	15	–	12	.556
Weber State	7	–	7	.500	18	–	11	.621
Nevada	7	–	7	.500	13	–	15	.464
Montana State †	6	–	8	.429	14	–	17	.452
Boise State	6	–	8	.429	12	–	16	.429
Idaho	4	–	10	.286	11	–	18	.379
† 1986 Big Sky tournament winner

1985–86 Big South Conference men's basketball standings
	Conf.				Overall
Team	W		L	PCT	W		L	PCT
Baptist †	5	–	1	.833	21	–	9	.700
Winthrop	5	–	3	.625	20	–	9	.690
Augusta State	4	–	4	.500	13	–	17	.433
Radford	3	–	4	.429	11	–	17	.393
UNC Asheville	4	–	2	.667	20	–	9	.690
Campbell	3	–	5	.375	8	–	19	.296
Armstrong State	4	–	3	.571	15	–	12	.556
Coastal Carolina	1	–	7	.125	10	–	17	.370
† 1986 Big South tournament winner Rankings from AP Poll

1985–86 Big Ten Conference men's basketball standings
	Conf.				Overall
Team	W		L	PCT	W		L	PCT
No. 5 Michigan	14	–	4	.778	28	–	5	.848
No. 16 Indiana	13	–	5	.722	21	–	8	.724
No. 18 Michigan State	12	–	6	.667	23	–	8	.742
No. 19 Illinois	11	–	7	.611	22	–	10	.688
Purdue	10	–	8	.556	22	–	10	.688
Iowa	10	–	8	.556	20	–	12	.625
Ohio State	8	–	10	.444	19	–	14	.576
Minnesota	5	–	13	.278	15	–	16	.484
Wisconsin	4	–	14	.222	12	–	16	.429
Northwestern	2	–	16	.111	8	–	20	.286
Rankings from AP Poll

1985–86 CAA men's basketball standings
	Conf.				Overall
Team	W		L	PCT	W		L	PCT
No. 17 Navy †	13	–	1	.929	30	–	5	.857
Richmond	12	–	2	.857	23	–	7	.767
George Mason	10	–	4	.714	20	–	12	.625
UNC Wilmington	6	–	8	.429	16	–	13	.552
East Carolina	6	–	8	.429	12	–	16	.429
American	3	–	11	.214	10	–	18	.357
William & Mary	3	–	11	.214	8	–	20	.286
James Madison	3	–	11	.214	5	–	23	.179
† 1986 CAA tournament winner Rankings from AP Poll

1985–86 ECC men's basketball standings
	Conf.				Overall
Team	W		L	PCT	W		L	PCT
Drexel †	11	–	3	.786	19	–	12	.613
Hofstra	9	–	5	.643	17	–	13	.567
Bucknell	8	–	6	.571	17	–	12	.586
Lafayette	8	–	6	.571	14	–	15	.483
Lehigh	6	–	8	.429	13	–	15	.464
Rider	5	–	9	.357	9	–	19	.321
Towson State	5	–	9	.357	8	–	20	.286
Delaware	4	–	10	.286	11	–	16	.407
† 1986 ECC tournament winner Rankings from AP poll

1985–86 ECAC Metro men's basketball standings
	Conf.				Overall
Team	W		L	PCT	W		L	PCT
Fairleigh Dickinson	13	–	3	.813	22	–	8	.733
Marist†	11	–	5	.688	19	–	12	.613
Loyola (MD)	10	–	6	.625	16	–	12	.571
Wagner	10	–	6	.625	16	–	13	.552
Saint Francis (PA)	8	–	8	.500	10	–	18	.357
Robert Morris	6	–	10	.375	10	–	18	.357
Monmouth*	6	–	10	.375	9	–	19	.321
St. Francis (NY)	4	–	12	.250	9	–	19	.321
Long Island	4	–	12	.250	9	–	19	.321
† 1986 ECAC Metro tournament winner Rankings from AP Poll; *Ineligible for conference tournament

1985–86 ECAC North men's basketball standings
	Conf.				Overall
Team	W		L	PCT	W		L	PCT
Northeastern †	16	–	2	.889	26	–	5	.839
Canisius	14	–	4	.778	21	–	8	.724
Boston University	13	–	5	.722	21	–	10	.677
Siena	12	–	6	.667	21	–	8	.724
Niagara	10	–	8	.556	14	–	14	.500
Hartford	10	–	8	.556	12	–	16	.429
New Hampshire	5	–	13	.278	11	–	17	.393
Maine	5	–	13	.278	7	–	20	.259
Vermont	5	–	13	.278	9	–	19	.321
Colgate	0	–	18	.000	1	–	24	.040
† 1986 ECAC North tournament winner Rankings from AP Poll

1985–86 Gulf Star Conference men's basketball standings
	Conf.				Overall
Team	W		L	PCT	W		L	PCT
Sam Houston State	9	–	1	.900	27	–	6	.818
Stephen F. Austin	7	–	3	.700	22	–	5	.815
Northwestern State	7	–	3	.700	11	–	16	.407
Southeastern Louisiana	3	–	5	.375	10	–	18	.357
Nicholls State	2	–	8	.200	8	–	16	.333
Southwest Texas State	1	–	9	.100	6	–	22	.214
Rankings from AP Poll

1985–86 Ivy League men's basketball standings
	Conf.				Overall
Team	W		L	PCT	W		L	PCT
Brown	10	–	4	.714	16	–	11	.593
Penn	9	–	5	.643	15	–	11	.577
Cornell	9	–	5	.643	14	–	12	.538
Princeton	7	–	7	.500	13	–	13	.500
Yale	7	–	7	.500	13	–	13	.500
Columbia	6	–	8	.429	12	–	14	.462
Dartmouth	6	–	8	.429	11	–	15	.423
Harvard	2	–	12	.143	6	–	20	.231
Rankings from AP Poll

1985–86 MAAC men's basketball standings
	Conf.				Overall
Team	W		L	PCT	W		L	PCT
Fairfield †	13	–	1	.929	24	–	7	.774
Iona	9	–	5	.643	14	–	15	.483
La Salle	8	–	6	.571	14	–	14	.500
Saint Peter's	7	–	7	.500	16	–	12	.571
Fordham	7	–	7	.500	13	–	17	.433
Holy Cross	6	–	8	.429	12	–	18	.400
Army	5	–	9	.357	9	–	18	.333
Manhattan	1	–	13	.071	2	–	26	.071
† 1986 MAAC tournament winner

1985–86 Metro Conference men's basketball standings
	Conf.				Overall
Team	W		L	PCT	W		L	PCT
No. 7 Louisville †	10	–	2	.833	32	–	7	.821
No. 12 Memphis State	9	–	3	.750	28	–	6	.824
Virginia Tech	7	–	5	.583	22	–	9	.710
Southern Miss	6	–	6	.500	17	–	12	.586
Cincinnati	5	–	7	.417	12	–	16	.429
Florida State	3	–	9	.250	12	–	17	.414
South Carolina	2	–	10	.167	12	–	16	.429
† 1986 Metro Conference tournament winner Rankings from AP Poll

1985–86 Midwestern Collegiate Conference men's basketball standings
	Conf.				Overall
Team	W		L	PCT	W		L	PCT
Xavier †	10	–	2	.833	25	–	5	.833
Saint Louis	8	–	4	.667	18	–	12	.600
Detroit	7	–	5	.583	14	–	15	.483
Loyola (IL)	7	–	5	.583	13	–	16	.448
Oral Roberts	5	–	7	.417	10	–	18	.357
Evansville	3	–	9	.250	8	–	19	.296
Butler	2	–	10	.167	9	–	19	.321
† 1986 MCC tournament winner

1985–86 Mid-American Conference men's basketball standings
	Conf.				Overall
Team	W		L	PCT	W		L	PCT
Miami (OH)	16	–	2	.889	24	–	7	.774
Ohio	14	–	4	.778	22	–	8	.733
Ball State †	11	–	7	.611	21	–	10	.677
Northern Illinois	10	–	8	.556	15	–	12	.556
Toledo	8	–	10	.444	12	–	17	.414
Western Michigan	7	–	11	.389	12	–	16	.429
Central Michigan	7	–	11	.389	11	–	17	.393
Kent State	7	–	11	.389	11	–	16	.407
Eastern Michigan	5	–	13	.278	9	–	18	.333
Bowling Green	5	–	13	.278	7	–	20	.259
† 1986 MAC tournament winner Rankings from AP Poll

1985–86 MEAC men's basketball standings
	Conf.				Overall
Team	W		L	PCT	W		L	PCT
North Carolina A&T †	12	–	2	.857	22	–	8	.733
Howard	11	–	3	.786	18	–	9	.667
Delaware State	7	–	7	.500	11	–	17	.393
Coppin State	7	–	7	.500	10	–	17	.370
Morgan State	7	–	7	.500	7	–	20	.259
South Carolina State	5	–	9	.357	10	–	18	.357
Bethune–Cookman	4	–	10	.286	7	–	22	.241
Maryland Eastern Shore	3	–	11	.214	5	–	23	.179
† 1986 MEAC tournament winner Rankings from AP Poll

1985–86 Missouri Valley Conference men's basketball standings
	Conf.				Overall
Team	W		L	PCT	W		L	PCT
No. 14 Bradley	16	–	0	1.000	32	–	3	.914
Tulsa †	10	–	6	.625	23	–	9	.719
Drake	10	–	6	.625	19	–	11	.633
Illinois State	9	–	7	.563	15	–	14	.517
Wichita State	7	–	9	.438	14	–	14	.500
Creighton	7	–	9	.438	12	–	16	.429
Indiana State	7	–	9	.438	11	–	17	.393
West Texas State	4	–	12	.250	11	–	17	.393
Southern Illinois	4	–	12	.250	8	–	20	.286
† 1986 MVC tournament winner Rankings from AP Poll

1985–86 Ohio Valley Conference men's basketball standings
	Conf.				Overall
Team	W		L	PCT	W		L	PCT
Akron †	10	–	4	.714	22	–	8	.733
Middle Tennessee	10	–	4	.714	23	–	11	.676
Murray State	8	–	6	.571	17	–	12	.586
Austin Peay	8	–	6	.571	14	–	14	.500
Youngstown State	8	–	6	.571	14	–	15	.483
Tennessee Tech	6	–	8	.429	14	–	15	.483
Eastern Kentucky	5	–	9	.357	10	–	18	.357
Morehead State	1	–	13	.071	8	–	19	.296
† 1986 OVC tournament winner Rankings from AP Poll

1985–86 Pacific-10 Conference men's basketball standings
	Conf.				Overall
Team	W		L	PCT	W		L	PCT
Arizona	14	–	4	.778	23	–	9	.719
Washington	13	–	5	.722	19	–	12	.613
California	11	–	7	.611	19	–	10	.655
UCLA	9	–	9	.500	15	–	14	.517
Arizona State	8	–	10	.444	14	–	14	.500
Washington State	8	–	10	.444	15	–	16	.484
Stanford	8	–	10	.444	14	–	16	.467
Oregon State	8	–	10	.444	12	–	15	.444
Oregon	6	–	12	.333	11	–	17	.393
USC	5	–	13	.278	11	–	17	.393
As of March 25, 1986; Rankings from AP Poll

1985–86 Southeastern Conference men's basketball standings
	Conf.				Overall
Team	W		L	PCT	W		L	PCT
No. 3 Kentucky †	17	–	1	.944	32	–	4	.889
Alabama	13	–	5	.722	24	–	9	.727
Auburn	13	–	5	.722	22	–	11	.667
Florida	10	–	8	.556	19	–	14	.576
LSU	9	–	9	.500	26	–	12	.684
Georgia	9	–	9	.500	17	–	13	.567
Vanderbilt	7	–	11	.389	13	–	15	.464
Tennessee	5	–	13	.278	12	–	16	.429
Ole Miss	4	–	14	.222	12	–	17	.414
Mississippi State	3	–	15	.167	6	–	22	.214
† 1986 SEC tournament winner Rankings from AP Poll

1985–86 Southern Conference men's basketball standings
	Conf.				Overall
Team	W		L	PCT	W		L	PCT
Chattanooga	12	–	4	.750	21	–	10	.677
Davidson†	10	–	6	.625	20	–	11	.645
Marshall	10	–	6	.625	19	–	11	.633
Appalachian State	9	–	7	.563	17	–	12	.586
Western Carolina	8	–	8	.500	14	–	14	.500
East Tennessee State	8	–	8	.500	13	–	16	.448
VMI	5	–	11	.313	11	–	17	.393
The Citadel	5	–	11	.313	10	–	18	.357
Furman	5	–	11	.313	10	–	17	.370
† Tournament winner As of April 30, 1986; Rankings from AP poll

1985–86 Southland Conference men's basketball standings
	Conf.				Overall
Team	W		L	PCT	W		L	PCT
NE Louisiana †	9	–	3	.750	20	–	10	.667
McNeese State	8	–	4	.667	21	–	11	.656
Arkansas State	7	–	5	.583	18	–	11	.621
Lamar	6	–	6	.500	18	–	12	.600
Louisiana Tech	6	–	6	.500	20	–	14	.588
North Texas State	4	–	8	.333	10	–	18	.357
UT Arlington	2	–	10	.167	12	–	18	.400
† 1986 Southland Conference tournament winner Rankings from AP Poll

1985–86 Southwest Conference men's basketball standings
	Conf.				Overall
Team	W		L	PCT	W		L	PCT
TCU	12	–	4	.750	22	–	9	.710
Texas	12	–	4	.750	19	–	12	.613
Texas A&M	12	–	4	.750	20	–	12	.625
SMU	10	–	6	.625	18	–	11	.621
Texas Tech †	9	–	7	.563	18	–	13	.581
Houston	8	–	8	.500	14	–	14	.500
Arkansas	4	–	12	.250	12	–	16	.429
Baylor	3	–	13	.188	11	–	16	.407
Rice	2	–	14	.125	9	–	19	.321
† 1986 SWC tournament winner Rankings from AP Poll

1985–86 SWAC men's basketball standings
	Conf.				Overall
Team	W		L	PCT	W		L	PCT
Southern	11	–	3	.786	19	–	8	.704
Alcorn State	11	–	3	.786	16	–	13	.552
Mississippi Valley State †	10	–	4	.714	20	–	11	.645
Jackson State	9	–	5	.643	14	–	15	.483
Texas Southern	6	–	8	.429	9	–	18	.333
Grambling State	4	–	10	.286	14	–	12	.538
Alabama State	4	–	10	.286	11	–	17	.393
Prairie View A&M	1	–	13	.071	5	–	25	.167
† 1986 SWAC tournament winner Rankings from AP Poll

1985–86 Sun Belt Conference men's basketball standings
	Conf.				Overall
Team	W		L	PCT	W		L	PCT
Old Dominion	11	–	3	.786	23	–	8	.742
Western Kentucky	10	–	4	.714	23	–	8	.742
UAB	9	–	5	.643	25	–	11	.694
Jacksonville †	9	–	5	.643	21	–	10	.677
VCU	6	–	8	.429	12	–	16	.429
South Alabama	5	–	9	.357	16	–	16	.500
South Florida	5	–	9	.357	14	–	14	.500
UNC Charlotte	1	–	13	.071	8	–	20	.286
† 1986 Sun Belt Conference tournament winner Rankings from AP Poll

1985–86 Trans America Athletic Conference men's basketball standings
	Conf.				Overall
Team	W		L	PCT	W		L	PCT
Arkansas–Little Rock †	12	–	2	.857	23	–	11	.676
Samford	8	–	6	.571	16	–	13	.552
Houston Baptist	7	–	7	.500	14	–	14	.500
Hardin–Simmons	7	–	7	.500	15	–	13	.536
Mercer	6	–	8	.429	15	–	14	.517
Centenary	6	–	8	.429	13	–	17	.433
Georgia Southern	6	–	8	.429	15	–	13	.536
Georgia State	4	–	10	.286	10	–	18	.357
Stetson	-	–	-	–	10	–	18	.357
† 1986 TAAC tournament winner Rankings from AP Poll

1985–86 West Coast Athletic Conference men's basketball standings
	Conf.				Overall
Team	W		L	PCT	W		L	PCT
Pepperdine	13	–	1	.929	25	–	5	.833
Loyola Marymount	10	–	4	.714	19	–	11	.633
San Diego	9	–	5	.643	19	–	9	.679
Gonzaga	8	–	6	.571	15	–	13	.536
Santa Clara	7	–	7	.500	12	–	16	.429
Portland	4	–	10	.286	13	–	15	.464
Saint Mary's	3	–	11	.214	10	–	17	.370
San Francisco	2	–	12	.143	7	–	21	.250
Rankings from AP Poll

1985–86 WAC men's basketball standings
	Conf.				Overall
Team	W		L	PCT	W		L	PCT
Wyoming	12	–	4	.750	24	–	12	.667
No. 20 UTEP †	12	–	4	.750	27	–	6	.818
Utah	12	–	4	.750	20	–	10	.667
Brigham Young	11	–	5	.688	18	–	14	.563
New Mexico	8	–	8	.500	17	–	14	.548
San Diego State	7	–	9	.438	10	–	19	.345
Colorado State	6	–	10	.375	11	–	18	.379
Air Force	3	–	13	.188	10	–	19	.345
Hawaii	1	–	15	.063	4	–	24	.143
† 1986 WAC tournament winner Rankings from AP Poll

=== Division I independents ===
A total of 17 college teams played as Division I independents. Among them, Notre Dame (23–6) had both the best winning percentage (.793) and the most wins.

1985–86 NCAA Division I men's basketball independents standings
	Conf.				Overall
Team	W		L	PCT	W		L	PCT
No. 10 Notre Dame	-	–	-	–	23	–	6	.793
Chicago State	-	–	-	–	22	–	6	.786
Eastern Washington	-	–	-	–	20	–	8	.714
Texas–Pan American	-	–	-	–	20	–	8	.714
Marquette	-	–	-	–	19	–	11	.633
DePaul	-	–	-	–	18	–	13	.581
New Orleans	-	–	-	–	16	–	12	.571
Dayton	-	–	-	–	17	–	13	.567
Southwestern Louisiana	-	–	-	–	15	–	13	.536
Miami (Fla.)	-	–	-	–	14	–	14	.500
Tennessee State	-	–	-	–	14	–	14	.500
Utica	-	–	-	–	13	–	14	.481
Florida A&M	-	–	-	–	12	–	16	.429
Brooklyn	-	–	-	–	9	–	22	.290
U.S. International	-	–	-	–	8	–	20	.286
Texas–San Antonio	-	–	-	–	7	–	24	.226
Central Florida	-	–	-	–	6	–	22	.214
Rankings from AP Poll

=== Informal championships ===
Conference	Regular season winner	Most Valuable Player
Philadelphia Big 5	Saint Joseph's & Temple	Harold Pressley, Villanova

Saint Joseph's and Temple both finished with 3–1 records in head-to-head competition among the Philadelphia Big 5.

=== Statistical leaders ===
Points per game			Rebounds per game			Assists per game			Steals per game		
Player	School	PPG	Player	School	RPG	Player	School	APG	Player	School	SPG
Terrance Bailey	Wagner	29.4	David Robinson	Navy	13.0	Mark Jackson	St. John's	9.1	Darron Brittman	Chicago St.	5.0
Scott Skiles	Michigan St.	27.4	Greg Anderson	Houston	12.9	Taurence Chisholm	Delaware	8.5	Jim Paguaga	St. Francis (NY)	4.3
Joe Yezbak	U. S. International	27.0	Brad Sellers	Ohio St.	12.6	Tyrone Bogues	Wake Forest	8.4	Leroy Allen	Hofstra	3.6
Reggie Miller	UCLA	25.9	Ron Harper	Miami (OH)	11.7	Ralph Lee	Xavier	8.4	Ron Harper	Miami (OH)	3.3
Ron Harper	Miami (OH)	24.4	Larry Krystkowiak	Montana	11.4	Derric Thomas	Monmouth	8.2	Harold Starks	Providence	3.2

Blocked shots per game			Field-goal percentage			Free-throw percentage		
Player	School	BPG	Player	School	FG%	Player	School	FT%
David Robinson	Navy	5.9	Brad Daugherty	N. Carolina	64.8	Greg Peters	Tulsa	100.0
Tim Perry	Temple	4.0	Ken Norman	Illinois	64.1	Jim Barton	Dartmouth	94.2
Rodney Blake	St. Joseph's	3.8	Kenny Gattison	Old Dominion	63.7	Damon Goodwin	Dayton	93.1
Lester Fonville	Jackson St.	3.2	Derrick McKey	Alabama	63.6	Rick Suder	Duquesne	91.8
Curtis Kitchen	S. Florida	3.2	Albert Thomas	Centenary	63.2	Scott Coval	William & Mary	91.7

== Postseason tournaments ==
=== NCAA tournament ===
==== Final Four - Reunion Arena, Dallas, Texas ====
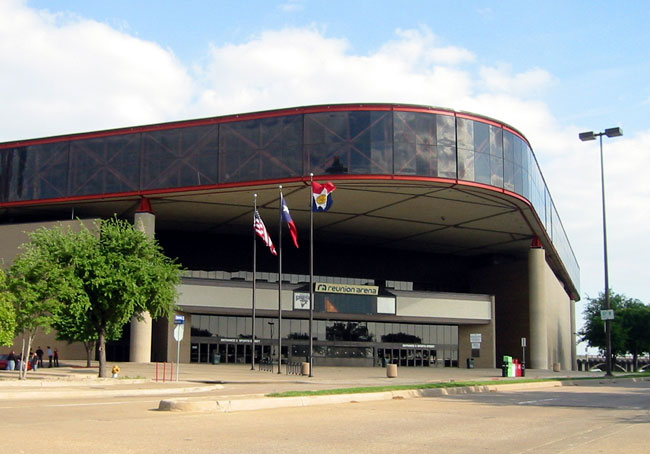
The Reunion Arena in Dallas, Texas, hosted the NCAA men's Final Four.

National semifinals
E1	Duke	71
M1	Kansas	67
S11	LSU	77
W2	Louisville	88

National championship game
E1	Duke	69
W2	Louisville	72

=== National Invitation tournament ===
==== NIT Semifinals and Finals ====
Played at Madison Square Garden in New York City

Semifinals
Louisiana Tech	66
Ohio State	79
Florida	58
Wyoming	67

Finals
Ohio State	73
Wyoming	63
Third place
Louisiana Tech	67
Florida	62

== Award winners ==
=== Consensus All-American teams ===
Consensus First Team
Player	Position	Class	Team
Steve Alford	G	Junior	Indiana
Walter Berry	F	Junior	St. John's
Len Bias	F	Senior	Maryland
Johnny Dawkins	G	Senior	Duke
Kenny Walker	F	Senior	Kentucky

Consensus Second Team
Player	Position	Class	Team
Dell Curry	G	Senior	Virginia Tech
Brad Daugherty	C	Senior	North Carolina
Ron Harper	G/F	Senior	Miami (OH)
Danny Manning	F	Sophomore	Kansas
David Robinson	C	Junior	Navy
Scott Skiles	G	Senior	Michigan State

=== Major player of the year awards ===
- Wooden Award: Walter Berry, St. John's
- Naismith Award: Johnny Dawkins, Duke
- Associated Press Player of the Year: Walter Berry, St. John's
- UPI Player of the Year: Walter Berry, St. John's
- NABC Player of the Year: Walter Berry, St. John's
- Oscar Robertson Trophy (USBWA): Walter Berry, St. John's
- Adolph Rupp Trophy: Walter Berry, St. John's
- Sporting News Player of the Year: Walter Berry, St. John's

=== Major coach of the year awards ===
- Associated Press Coach of the Year: Eddie Sutton, Kentucky
- UPI Coach of the Year: Mike Krzyzewski, Duke
- Henry Iba Award (USBWA): Dick Versace, Bradley
- NABC Coach of the Year: Eddie Sutton, Kentucky
- CBS/Chevrolet Coach of the Year: Mike Krzyzewski, Duke
- Sporting News Coach of the Year: Denny Crum, Louisville

=== Other major awards ===
- Frances Pomeroy Naismith Award (Best player under 6'0): Jim Les, Bradley
- Robert V. Geasey Trophy (Top player in Philadelphia Big 5): Harold Pressley, Villanova
- NIT/Haggerty Award (Top player in New York City metro area): Walter Berry, St. John's

== Coaching changes ==
A number of teams changed coaches during the season and after it ended.

Team	Former Coach	Interim Coach	New Coach	Reason
Appalachian State	Kevin Cantwell		Tom Apke	
Boston College	Gary Williams		Jim O'Brien	Williams left to coach Ohio State.
Bowling Green	John Weinert		Jim Larrañaga	
Bradley	Dick Versace		Stan Albeck	Versace was hired to the Detroit Pistons coaching staff.
Colgate	Tony Relvas		Joe Baker	
Colorado	Tom Apke		Tom Miller	Apke left to coach Appalachian State.
Coppin State	John Bates		Fang Mitchell	
Cornell	Tom Miller		Mike Dement	Miller left to coach Colorado. Dement was hired from the East Carolina coaching staff.
Connecticut	Dom Perno		Jim Calhoun	
Florida State	Joe Williams		Pat Kennedy	
Fordham	Tom Penders		Bob Quinn	Penders left to coach Rhode Island.
Fresno State	Boyd Grant		Ron Adams	
Grambling State	Fred Hobdy		Bob Hoskins	
Houston	Guy Lewis		Pat Foster	
Idaho	Bill Trumbo		Tim Floyd	Floyd was hired from the UTEP coaching staff.
Iona	Pat Kennedy		Gary Brokaw	Kennedy left to coach Florida State.
Iowa	George Raveling		Tom Davis	Raveling left to coach USC.
Jackson State	Paul Covington		John Prince	Covington left to be the assistant athletic director at Jackson State.
Kansas State	Jack Hartman		Lon Kruger	
La Salle	Lefty Ervin		Speedy Morris	Morris was hired from the La Salle women's team after going 43–17.
Lamar	Pat Foster		Tom Abatemarco	Foster left to coach Houston.
Southwestern Louisiana	Bobby Paschal		Marty Fletcher	Paschal left to coach South Florida.
Manhattan	Tom Sullivan		Bob Delle Bovi	
Marist	Matt Furjanic		Dave Magarity	
Marquette	Rick Majerus		Bob Dukiet	Majerus left to join the Milwaukee Bucks coaching staff.
Maryland	Lefty Driesell		Bob Wade	Driesell resigned and took the position of assistant athletic director at Maryland.
Minnesota	Jim Dutcher	Jimmy Williams	Clem Haskins	Dutcher resigned midway through the season after three players were arrested on rape charges. University of Maryland forfeited their next game and Dutcher resigned in protest. All three players were acquitted. Jimmy Williams coached the remainder of the season. Haskins was hired from Western Kentucky.
Mississippi State	Bob Boyd		Richard Williams	
Montana	Mike Montgomery		Stew Morrill	Montgomery left to coach Stanford. Morrill was an assistant under Montgomery.
Navy	Paul Evans		Pete Herrmann	Evans left to coach Pittsburgh.
Nebraska	Moe Iba		Danny Nee	
North Texas	Tommy Newman		Jimmy Gales	
Northern Illinois	John McDougal		Jim Rosborough	
Northern Iowa	James Berry		Eldon Miller	
Northeastern	Jim Calhoun		Karl Fogel	Calhoun left to coach Connecticut.
Northwestern	Rich Falk		Bill Foster	
Ohio	Danny Nee		Billy Hahn	Nee left to coach Nebraska.
Ohio State	Eldon Miller		Gary Williams	Miller left to coach Northern Iowa.
Oklahoma State	Paul Hansen		Leonard Hamilton	Hamilton was hired from the Kentucky coaching staff.
Ole Miss	Lee Hunt		Ed Murphy	
Pittsburgh	Roy Chipman		Paul Evans	
Rhode Island	Brendan Malone		Tom Penders	Malone left to join the New York Knicks coaching staff.
Saint Mary's	Bill Oates		Lynn Nance	
Saint Peter's	Bob Dukiet		Ted Fiore	Dukiet left to coach Marquette.
Sam Houston State	Robert McPherson		Steve Tucker	McPherson left to coach UNC Wilmington.
Siena	John Griffin		Mike Deane	Deane was hired off the Michigan State coaching staff.
South Carolina	Bill Foster		George Felton	Foster left to coach Northwestern.
South Florida	Lee Rose		Bobby Paschal	
Southern	Bob Hopkins		Ben Jobe	Hopkins left to coach Grambling State.
Southwestern Texas State	Celester Collier		Harry Larrabee	
St. Bonaventure	Jim O'Brien		Ron DeCarli	O'Brien left to coach Boston College.
Stanford	Tom Davis		Mike Montgomery	Davis left to coach Iowa.
Texas–Pan American	Lon Kruger		Kevin Wall	Kruger left to coach Kansas State.
Texas–San Antonio	Don Eddy	Larry Gatewood	Ken Burmeister	Burmeister left Arizona coaching staff to become head coach.
UNC Wilmington	Mel Gibson		Robert McPherson	
USC	Stan Morrison		George Raveling	
VMI	Marty Fletcher		Joe Cantafio	Fletcher left to coach Louisiana.
Wichita State	Gene Smithson		Eddie Fogler	Fogler, former player and long time assistant under Dean Smith, becomes head coach.
Winthrop	Neild Gordon		Steve Vacendak	
Western Kentucky	Clem Haskins		Murray Arnold	Arnold was hired from the Chicago Bulls coaching staff.
Yale	Tom Brennan		Dick Kuchen	Brennan left to coach Vermont.
