= 1985–86 Wisconsin Badgers men's basketball team =

American college basketball season

1985–86 Wisconsin Badgers men's basketball
- Conference: Big Ten Conference
- Record: 12–16 (4–14 Big Ten)
- Head coach: Steve Yoder (4th season)
- Assistant coaches: Rick Bowen; Ray McCallum; Brad McNulty
- Home arena: UW Fieldhouse

1985–86 Big Ten Conference men's basketball standings
| | Conf. | | | | Overall |
| Team | W | | L | PCT | W | | L | PCT |
|---|---|---|---|---|---|---|---|---|
| No. 5 Michigan | 14 | – | 4 | .778 | 28 | – | 5 | .848 |
| No. 16 Indiana | 13 | – | 5 | .722 | 21 | – | 8 | .724 |
| No. 18 Michigan State | 12 | – | 6 | .667 | 23 | – | 8 | .742 |
| No. 19 Illinois | 11 | – | 7 | .611 | 22 | – | 10 | .688 |
| Purdue | 10 | – | 8 | .556 | 22 | – | 10 | .688 |
| Iowa | 10 | – | 8 | .556 | 20 | – | 12 | .625 |
| Ohio State | 8 | – | 10 | .444 | 19 | – | 14 | .576 |
| Minnesota | 5 | – | 13 | .278 | 15 | – | 16 | .484 |
| Wisconsin | 4 | – | 14 | .222 | 12 | – | 16 | .429 |
| Northwestern | 2 | – | 16 | .111 | 8 | – | 20 | .286 |
Rankings from AP Poll

The 1985–86 Wisconsin Badgers men's basketball team represented University of Wisconsin–Madison. The head coach was Steve Yoder, coaching his fourth season with the Badgers. The team played their home games at the UW Fieldhouse in Madison, Wisconsin and was a member of the Big Ten Conference.

== Roster ==
1985–86 Wisconsin Badgers men's basketball team
Players
Coaches

| Pos. | # | Name | Height | Weight | Year | Hometown |
|---|---|---|---|---|---|---|
| G | 10 | Mike Heineman | 6 ft 3 in (1.91 m) | 185 lb (84 kg) | Jr | Connersville, Indiana |
| G | 12 | Rick Olson | 6 ft 1 in (1.85 m) | 165 lb (75 kg) | Sr | Madison, Wisconsin |
| G | 22 | Pollis Robertson | 6 ft 7 in (2.01 m) | 210 lb (95 kg) | Fr | Wayne, Michigan |
| G | 24 | Shelton Smith, Jr. | 6 ft 0 in (1.83 m) | 175 lb (79 kg) | So | Indianapolis, Indiana |
| G/F | 30 | Tom Molaski | 6 ft 6 in (1.98 m) | 205 lb (93 kg) | Fr | Grafton, Wisconsin |
| G | 32 | Trent Jackson | 6 ft 1 in (1.85 m) | 180 lb (82 kg) | Fr | Bolingbrook, Illinois |
| F | 40 | J.J. Weber | 6 ft 7 in (2.01 m) | 240 lb (109 kg) | Jr | Wales, Wisconsin |
| F | 41 | Rob Willey | 6 ft 9 in (2.06 m) | 220 lb (100 kg) | Fr | Neenah, Wisconsin |
| F | 42 | Rod Ripley | 6 ft 8 in (2.03 m) | 230 lb (104 kg) | Jr | Pulaski, Wisconsin |
| F | 44 | Gregg Steinhaus | 6 ft 9 in (2.06 m) | 185 lb (84 kg) | Sr | Portage, Wisconsin |
| C | 52 | Darin Schubring | 6 ft 10 in (2.08 m) | 225 lb (102 kg) | Fr | Baraboo, Wisconsin |
| F | 54 | Jay Laszewski | 6 ft 8 in (2.03 m) | 190 lb (86 kg) | Sr | Stevens Point, Wisconsin |

Head coach

- Steve Yoder (Illinois Wesleyan)

Assistant coach(es)

- Rick Bowen (Indiana)
- Ray McCallum (Ball State)
- Brad McNulty (Purdue)

Legend

- (C) Team captain
- (S) Suspended
- (I) Ineligible
- (W) Walk-on
- Injured
- Current redshirt

== Schedule ==
| Date time, TV | Rank^{#} | Opponent^{#} | Result | Record | Site city, state |
Regular Season
| 11/22/1985* | | at South Carolina | W 68–65 | 1–0 | Carolina Coliseum; Columbia, SC |
| 11/27/1985* | | Cal State-Los Angeles | W 104–88 | 2–0 | UW Fieldhouse; Madison, WI |
| 11/30/1985* | | Marquette | W 75–74 | 3–0 | UW Fieldhouse; Madison, WI |
| 12/2/1985* | | San Francisco State | W 90–61 | 4–0 | UW Fieldhouse; Madison, WI |
| 12/5/1985* | | East Texas State | W 82–60 | 5–0 | UW Fieldhouse; Madison, WI |
| 12/7/1985* | | Miami (FL) | W 88–66 | 6–0 | UW Fieldhouse; Madison, WI |
| 12/9/1985* | | at Washington State | W 74–68 | 7–0 | Beasley Coliseum; Pullman, WA |
| 12/12/1985* | | Northern Illinois | W 76–67 | 8–0 | UW Fieldhouse; Madison, WI |
| 12/27/1985* | | vs. Boston College; Fiesta Bowl Classic | L 72–74 | 8–1 | McKale Center; Tucson, AZ |
| 12/28/1985* | | vs. Princeton; Fiesta Bowl Classic | L 49–54 | 8–2 | McKale Center; Tucson, AZ |
| 1/4/1986 | | Northwestern | W 57–52 | 9–2 (1–0) | UW Fieldhouse; Madison, WI |
| 1/9/1986 | | Ohio State | L 61–78 | 9–3 (1–1) | UW Fieldhouse; Madison, WI |
| 1/11/1986 | | Indiana | L 69–80 | 9–4 (1–2) | UW Fieldhouse; Madison, WI |
| 1/16/1986 | | at Illinois | L 54–73 | 9–5 (1–3) | Assembly Hall; Champaign, IL |
| 1/19/1986 | | at No. 19 Purdue | L 73–100 | 9–6 (1–4) | Mackey Arena; West Lafayette, IN |
| 1/23/1986 | | Minnesota | L 65–67 | 9–7 (1–5) | UW Fieldhouse; Madison, WI |
| 1/25/1986 | | Iowa | W 69–63 | 10–7 (2–5) | UW Fieldhouse; Madison, WI |
| 1/30/1986 | | at Michigan State | L 81–83 | 10–8 (2–6) | Breslin Center; East Lansing, MI |
| 2/1/1986 | | at No. 9 Michigan | L 64–91 | 10–9 (2–7) | Crisler Arena; Ann Arbor, MI |
| 2/6/1986 | | at No. 18 Indiana | L 69–78 | 10–10 (2–8) | Assembly Hall; Bloomington, IN |
| 2/8/1986 | | at Ohio State | L 71–73 | 10–11 (2–9) | St. John Arena; Columbus, OH |
| 2/13/1986 | | Purdue | L 78–80 | 10–12 (2–10) | UW Fieldhouse; Madison, WI |
| 2/15/1986 | | Illinois | L 74–82 | 10–13 (2–11) | UW Fieldhouse; Madison, WI |
| 2/11/1986 | | at Iowa | L 48–101 | 10–14 (2–12) | Carver–Hawkeye Arena; Iowa City, IA |
| 2/22/1986 | | at Minnesota | W 70–64 | 11–14 (3–12) | Williams Arena; Minneapolis, MN |
| 2/26/1986 | | No. 10 Michigan | L 74–97 | 11–15 (3–13) | UW Fieldhouse; Madison, WI |
| 3/2/1986 | | No. 17 Michigan State | L 71–84 | 11–16 (3–14) | UW Fieldhouse; Madison, WI |
| 3/9/1986 | | at Northwestern | W 70–68 | 12–16 (4–14) | Welsh–Ryan Arena; Evanston, IL |
*Non-conference game. ^{#}Rankings from AP Poll. (#) Tournament seedings in parentheses.
