= 1986 MEAC men's basketball tournament =

- Classification: Division I
- Season: 1985–86
- Teams: 6
- Site: Greensboro Coliseum; Greensboro, North Carolina
- Champions: North Carolina A&T (11th title)
- Winning coach: Don Corbett (5th title)
- MVP: Thomas Griffis (North Carolina A&T)

1985–86 MEAC men's basketball standings
	Conf.				Overall
Team	W		L	PCT	W		L	PCT
North Carolina A&T †	12	–	2	.857	22	–	8	.733
Howard	11	–	3	.786	18	–	9	.667
Delaware State	7	–	7	.500	11	–	17	.393
Coppin State	7	–	7	.500	10	–	17	.370
Morgan State	7	–	7	.500	7	–	20	.259
South Carolina State	5	–	9	.357	10	–	18	.357
Bethune–Cookman	4	–	10	.286	7	–	22	.241
Maryland Eastern Shore	3	–	11	.214	5	–	23	.179
† 1986 MEAC tournament winner Rankings from AP Poll

The 1986 Mid-Eastern Athletic Conference (MEAC) men's basketball tournament took place March 6–8, 1986, at Greensboro Coliseum in Greensboro, North Carolina. North Carolina A&T defeated Howard, 53–52 in the championship game, to win its fifth consecutive MEAC Tournament title.

The Aggies earned an automatic bid to the 1987 NCAA tournament as a No. 16 seed in the Midwest region.

== Format ==
Six of eight conference members participated,. The play began in the quarterfinal round. Teams were seeded based on their regular season conference record.

== Bracket ==
Quarterfinals; March 6
4	South Carolina State	85
5	Bethune–Cookman	92
3	Delaware State	64
6	Maryland Eastern Shore	75

Semifinals; March 7
1	North Carolina A&T	75
5	Bethune-Cookman	66
6	Maryland-Eastern Shore	55
2	Howard	83

Final; March 8
1	North Carolina A&T	53
2	Howard	52

* denotes overtime period
