= 1985–86 Purdue Boilermakers men's basketball team =

American college basketball season

1985–86 Purdue Boilermakers men's basketball

NCAA tournament
- Conference: Big Ten Conference
- Record: 22–10 (11–7 Big Ten)
- Head coach: Gene Keady (6th season)
- Assistant coaches: Bruce Weber (6th season); Kevin Stallings (4th season)
- Home arena: Mackey Arena

1985–86 Big Ten Conference men's basketball standings
	Conf.				Overall
Team	W		L	PCT	W		L	PCT
No. 5 Michigan	14	–	4	.778	28	–	5	.848
No. 16 Indiana	13	–	5	.722	21	–	8	.724
No. 18 Michigan State	12	–	6	.667	23	–	8	.742
No. 19 Illinois	11	–	7	.611	22	–	10	.688
Purdue	10	–	8	.556	22	–	10	.688
Iowa	10	–	8	.556	20	–	12	.625
Ohio State	8	–	10	.444	19	–	14	.576
Minnesota	5	–	13	.278	15	–	16	.484
Wisconsin	4	–	14	.222	12	–	16	.429
Northwestern	2	–	16	.111	8	–	20	.286
Rankings from AP Poll

The 1985–86 Purdue Boilermakers men's basketball team represented Purdue University during the 1985–86 college basketball season. Led by head coach Gene Keady, the team played their home games at Mackey Arena in West Lafayette, Indiana. The Boilermakers finished fourth in the Big Ten standings and received an at-large bid to the NCAA tournament as No. 6 seed in the Southeast Region.

Purdue was upset in the opening round by No. 11 seed and eventual Final Four participant LSU, 94–87 in 2OT, in a game that was played on the Tigers home floor. The Boilermakers finished the season with a 22–10 record (11–7 Big Ten).

== Roster ==
1985–86 Purdue Boilermakers men's basketball team
Players
Coaches

Pos.	#	Name	Height	Weight	Year	Hometown
G	11	Mack Gadis	6 ft 1 in (1.85 m)	—	Sr	Indianapolis, Indiana
G/F	20	Doug Lee	6 ft 5 in (1.96 m)	195 lb (88 kg)	Jr	Washington, Illinois
G	21	Everette Stephens	6 ft 2 in (1.88 m)	175 lb (79 kg)	So	Evanston, Illinois
G	23	Troy Lewis	6 ft 7 in (2.01 m)	205 lb (93 kg)	So	Toledo, Ohio
F	30	Kip Jones	6 ft 8 in (2.03 m)	—	Fr
F	33	Todd Mitchell	6 ft 4 in (1.93 m)	190 lb (86 kg)	So	Anderson, Indiana
F	35	Melvin McCants	6 ft 8 in (2.03 m)	240 lb (109 kg)	Fr	Chicago, Illinois

Head coach

- Gene Keady (Kansas State)

Assistant coach(es)

- Bruce Weber (Milwaukee)
- Kevin Stallings (Purdue)

Legend

- (C) Team captain
- (S) Suspended
- (I) Ineligible
- (W) Walk-on
- Injured
- Current redshirt

== Schedule and results ==
Date time, TV	Rank^{#}	Opponent^{#}	Result	Record	Site city, state
Non-conference regular season
Nov 26, 1985*		Stetson	W 88–52	1–0	Mackey Arena; West Lafayette, Indiana
Nov 29, 1985*		at Alaska Anchorage; Great Alaska Shootout	W 92–70	2–0	Sullivan Arena; Anchorage, Alaska
Nov 30, 1985*		vs. No. 1 North Carolina; Great Alaska Shootout	L 62–73	2–1	Sullivan Arena; Anchorage, Alaska
Dec 1, 1985*		vs. Arizona; Great Alaska Shootout	W 81–74	3–1	Sullivan Arena; Anchorage, Alaska
Dec 3, 1985*		San Francisco State	W 82–70	4–1	Mackey Arena; West Lafayette, Indiana
Dec 5, 1985*		Morehead State	W 81–71	5–1	Mackey Arena; West Lafayette, Indiana
Dec 7, 1985*		at No. 16 Louisville	L 58–77	5–2	Freedom Hall; Louisville, Kentucky
Dec 9, 1985*		at Southern Illinois	W 86–67	6–2	Banterra Center; Carbondale, Illinois
Dec 15, 1985*		Toledo	W 72–56	7–2	Mackey Arena; West Lafayette, Indiana
Dec 21, 1985*		Detroit	W 79–59	8–2	Mackey Arena; West Lafayette, Indiana
Dec 23, 1985*		No. 20 DePaul	W 71–56	9–2	Mackey Arena; West Lafayette, Indiana
Big Ten Regular Season
Mar 8, 1986		at Iowa	L 64–77	22–9 (11–7)	Carver-Hawkeye Arena; Iowa City, Iowa
NCAA Tournament
Mar 13, 1986*		vs. (SE #11) LSU; First Round	L 87–94 ^{2OT}	22–10	LSU Assembly Center; Baton Rouge, Louisiana
*Non-conference game. ^{#}Rankings from AP Poll. (#) Tournament seedings in parentheses. SE=Southeast.
