= 1985–86 North Carolina A&T Aggies men's basketball team =

American college basketball season

1985–86 North Carolina A&T Aggies men's basketball

MEAC regular season champions MEAC tournament champions

NCAA tournament, First Round
- Conference: Mid-Eastern Athletic Conference
- Record: 22–8 (12–2 MEAC)
- Head coach: Don Corbett (7th season)
- Home arena: Corbett Sports Center

1985–86 MEAC men's basketball standings
	Conf.				Overall
Team	W		L	PCT	W		L	PCT
North Carolina A&T †	12	–	2	.857	22	–	8	.733
Howard	11	–	3	.786	18	–	9	.667
Delaware State	7	–	7	.500	11	–	17	.393
Coppin State	7	–	7	.500	10	–	17	.370
Morgan State	7	–	7	.500	7	–	20	.259
South Carolina State	5	–	9	.357	10	–	18	.357
Bethune–Cookman	4	–	10	.286	7	–	22	.241
Maryland Eastern Shore	3	–	11	.214	5	–	23	.179
† 1986 MEAC tournament winner Rankings from AP Poll

The 1985–86 North Carolina A&T Aggies men's basketball team represented North Carolina Agricultural and Technical State University during the 1985–86 NCAA Division I men's basketball season. The Aggies, led by 7th-year head coach Don Corbett, played their home games at the Corbett Sports Center as members of the Mid-Eastern Athletic Conference. They finished the season 22–8, 12–2 in MEAC play to finish in first place. They were champions of the MEAC tournament, winning the championship game over Howard, to earn an automatic bid to the 1986 NCAA tournament where they were defeated by No. 1 seed Kansas, 71–46, in the opening round.

== Roster ==
1985–86 North Carolina A&T Aggies men's basketball team
Players
Coaches

Pos.	#	Name	Height	Weight	Year	Hometown
G		George Cale	6 ft 6 in (1.98 m)	—	Jr
F		Claude Williams	6 ft 7 in (2.01 m)	—	So

Head coach

- Don Corbett

Assistant coach(es)

Legend

- (C) Team captain
- (S) Suspended
- (I) Ineligible
- (W) Walk-on
- Injured
- Current redshirt

== Schedule and results ==
Date time, TV	Rank^{#}	Opponent^{#}	Result	Record	Site (attendance) city, state
Regular season
Jan 8, 1986*		at NC State	L 48–66	1–4	Reynolds Coliseum; Raleigh, North Carolina
Jan 22, 1986*		at No. 20 Virginia Tech	L 75–79	4–6	Cassell Coliseum; Blacksburg, Virginia
1986 MEAC tournament
Mar 7, 1986*		vs. Bethune-Cookman; Semifinals	W 75–66	21–7	The Palestra; Philadelphia, Pennsylvania
Mar 8, 1986*		vs. Howard; Championship game	W 53–52	22–7	The Palestra; Philadelphia, Pennsylvania
1986 NCAA tournament
Mar 13, 1986*	(16 MW)	vs. (1 MW) No. 2 Kansas; First round	L 46–71	22–8	University of Dayton Arena; Dayton, Ohio
*Non-conference game. ^{#}Rankings from AP Poll. (#) Tournament seedings in parentheses. ME=Mideast. All times are in Eastern Time.
