= 1986 MAAC men's basketball tournament =

- Classification: Division I
- Season: 1985–86
- Teams: 8
- Site: Meadowlands Arena; East Rutherford, New Jersey
- Champions: Fairfield (1st title)
- Winning coach: Mitch Buonaguro (1st title)
- MVP: Jim McCaffrey (Holy Cross)

1985–86 MAAC men's basketball standings
	Conf.				Overall
Team	W		L	PCT	W		L	PCT
Fairfield †	13	–	1	.929	24	–	7	.774
Iona	9	–	5	.643	14	–	15	.483
La Salle	8	–	6	.571	14	–	14	.500
Saint Peter's	7	–	7	.500	16	–	12	.571
Fordham	7	–	7	.500	13	–	17	.433
Holy Cross	6	–	8	.429	12	–	18	.400
Army	5	–	9	.357	9	–	18	.333
Manhattan	1	–	13	.071	2	–	26	.071
† 1986 MAAC tournament winner

The 1986 MAAC men's basketball tournament was held February 27–March 1 at the Meadowlands Arena in East Rutherford, New Jersey.

Fairfield defeated Holy Cross in the championship game, 67–64, to win their first MAAC men's basketball tournament.

The Stags received a bid to the 1986 NCAA tournament – the first NCAA Tournament appearance in school history – where they were beaten by Illinois in the opening round, 75–51.

== Format ==
All eight of the conference's members participated in the tournament field. They were seeded based on regular season conference records, with all teams starting play in the quarterfinal round.

All games were played at a neutral site at the Meadowlands Arena in East Rutherford, New Jersey.

== Bracket ==
Quarterfinals; Friday, February 27
1	Fairfield	80
8	Manhattan	56
4	Fordham	52
5	Saint Peter's	61
3	La Salle	70
6	Holy Cross	72
2	Iona	64
7	Army	60

Semifinals; Saturday, February 28
1	Fairfield	49
5	Saint Peter's	47
6	Holy Cross	81
2	Iona	77

Championship; Sunday, March 1
1	Fairfield	67
6	Holy Cross	44
