= 1986 Big South Conference men's basketball tournament =

- Classification: Division I
- Season: 1985–86
- Teams: 8
- Site: Savannah Civic Center; Savannah, GA
- Champions: Baptist College (1st title)
- Winning coach: Tommy Gaither (1st title)
- MVP: Ben Hinson (Charleston Southern)

1985–86 Big South Conference men's basketball standings
	Conf.				Overall
Team	W		L	PCT	W		L	PCT
Baptist †	5	–	1	.833	21	–	9	.700
Winthrop	5	–	3	.625	20	–	9	.690
Augusta State	4	–	4	.500	13	–	17	.433
Radford	3	–	4	.429	11	–	17	.393
UNC Asheville	4	–	2	.667	20	–	9	.690
Campbell	3	–	5	.375	8	–	19	.296
Armstrong State	4	–	3	.571	15	–	12	.556
Coastal Carolina	1	–	7	.125	10	–	17	.370
† 1986 Big South tournament winner Rankings from AP Poll

The 1986 Big South Conference men's basketball tournament was the inaugural tournament for the Big South Conference, taking place March 3–5, 1986, at the Savannah Civic Center in Savannah, Georgia. The Baptist College Buccaneers (now known as Charleston Southern) won the tournament, led by head coach Tommy Gaither.

== Format ==
All of the conference's eight members participated in the tournament, hosted at the Savannah Civic Center. Teams were seeded by conference winning percentage.

== Bracket ==
Quarterfinals; March 3
1	Baptist	71
8	Coastal Carolina	70
4	Radford	62
5	UNC Asheville	64
3	Augusta State	67
6	Campbell	55
2	Winthrop	76
7	Armstrong State	72^{OT}

Semifinals; March 4
1	Baptist	65
5	UNC Asheville	64^{OT}
2	Winthrop	79
3	Augusta State	87

Finals; March 5
1	Baptist	68
3	Augusta State	60

- Source

== All-Tournament Team ==
- Ben Hinson, Charleston Southern
- Bernard Innocent, Charleston Southern
- Eric Rogers, Augusta State
- Eric Juratic, Augusta State
- Byron Samuels, UNC Asheville
- Allen Washington, Winthrop
