= 1985–86 Fairfield Stags men's basketball team =

American college basketball season

1985–86 Fairfield Stags men's basketball
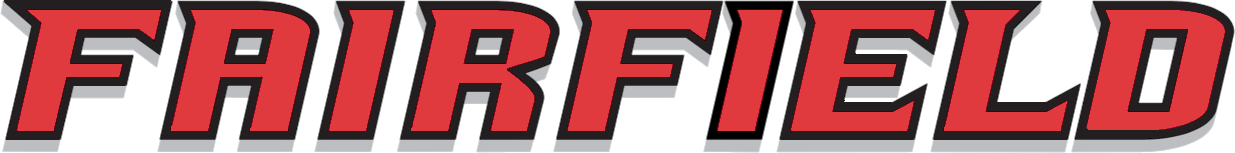

MAAC Regular season champion MAAC tournament champion

NCAA tournament
- Conference: Metro Atlantic Athletic Conference
- Record: 24–7 (13–1 MAAC)
- Head coach: Mitch Buonaguro (1st season)
- Home arena: Alumni Hall

1985–86 MAAC men's basketball standings
	Conf.				Overall
Team	W		L	PCT	W		L	PCT
Fairfield †	13	–	1	.929	24	–	7	.774
Iona	9	–	5	.643	14	–	15	.483
La Salle	8	–	6	.571	14	–	14	.500
Saint Peter's	7	–	7	.500	16	–	12	.571
Fordham	7	–	7	.500	13	–	17	.433
Holy Cross	6	–	8	.429	12	–	18	.400
Army	5	–	9	.357	9	–	18	.333
Manhattan	1	–	13	.071	2	–	26	.071
† 1986 MAAC tournament winner

The 1985–86 Fairfield Stags men's basketball team represented Fairfield University in the 1985–86 NCAA Division I men's basketball season. The Stags, led by first year head coach Mitch Buonaguro, played their home games at Alumni Hall in Fairfield, Connecticut as members of the Metro Atlantic Athletic Conference. They finished the season 24–7, 13–1 in MAAC play to win the conference regular season title. They also won the MAAC tournament to earn an automatic bid to the NCAA tournament as the No. 13 seed in the Southeast region. Making their first appearance in the NCAA Tournament, the Stags were beaten by No. 4 seed Illinois, 75–51.

== Roster ==
1985–86 Fairfield Stags men's basketball team
Players
Coaches

Pos.	#	Name	Height	Weight	Year	Previous school	Hometown
G		Tony George	6 ft 3 in (1.91 m)	—	Sr
G		A. J. Wynder	6 ft 2 in (1.88 m)	—	RS Jr	UMass	The Bronx, New York

Head coach

- Mitch Buonaguro (Boston College)

Assistant coach(es)

Legend

- (C) Team captain
- (S) Suspended
- (I) Ineligible
- (W) Walk-on
- Injured
- Current redshirt

Roster

== Schedule and results ==
Date time, TV	Rank^{#}	Opponent^{#}	Result	Record	Site (attendance) city, state
Regular season
Dec 7, 1985*		Saint Joseph's	L 59–72	2–2	Alumni Hall; Fairfield, Connecticut
Dec 10, 1985*		vs. Connecticut	L 72–74	2–3	New Haven Coliseum; New Haven, Connecticut
Jan 2, 1986*		at Miami (FL)	W 56–47	7–3	Knight Center; Miami, Florida
Jan 8, 1986*		vs. No. 4 Syracuse	L 67–90	7–4	New Haven Coliseum; New Haven, Connecticut
Feb 12, 1986*		Navy	L 53–78	17–6	Alumni Hall; Fairfield, Connecticut
MAAC Tournament
Feb 27, 1986*		vs. Manhattan; Quarterfinals	W 80–56	22–6	Brendan Byrne Arena; East Rutherford, New Jersey
Feb 28, 1986*		vs. Saint Peter's; Semifinals	W 49–47	23–6	Brendan Byrne Arena; East Rutherford, New Jersey
Mar 1, 1986*		vs. Holy Cross; Championship game	W 67–64	24–6	Brendan Byrne Arena; East Rutherford, New Jersey
NCAA Tournament
Mar 14, 1986*	(13 SE)	vs. (4 SE) No. 19 Illinois; First Round	L 51–75	24–7	Charlotte Coliseum; Charlotte, North Carolina
*Non-conference game. ^{#}Rankings from AP Poll. (#) Tournament seedings in parentheses. All times are in Eastern.
