= 1985–86 Ohio State Buckeyes men's basketball team =

American college basketball season

1985–86 Ohio State Buckeyes men's basketball

National Invitation Tournament, Champions
- Conference: Big Ten Conference
- Record: 19–14 (8–10 Big Ten)
- Head coach: Eldon Miller (10th season)
- Assistant coach: Randy Ayers (2nd season)
- Home arena: St. John Arena

1985–86 Big Ten Conference men's basketball standings
	Conf.				Overall
Team	W		L	PCT	W		L	PCT
No. 5 Michigan	14	–	4	.778	28	–	5	.848
No. 16 Indiana	13	–	5	.722	21	–	8	.724
No. 18 Michigan State	12	–	6	.667	23	–	8	.742
No. 19 Illinois	11	–	7	.611	22	–	10	.688
Purdue	10	–	8	.556	22	–	10	.688
Iowa	10	–	8	.556	20	–	12	.625
Ohio State	8	–	10	.444	19	–	14	.576
Minnesota	5	–	13	.278	15	–	16	.484
Wisconsin	4	–	14	.222	12	–	16	.429
Northwestern	2	–	16	.111	8	–	20	.286
Rankings from AP Poll

The 1985–86 Ohio State Buckeyes men's basketball team represented Ohio State University during the 1985–86 NCAA Division I men's basketball season. Led by tenth-year head coach Eldon Miller, the Buckeyes finished 19–14 (8–10 Big Ten) and won the National Invitation Tournament.

== Roster ==
1985–86 Ohio State Buckeyes men's basketball team
Players
Coaches

Pos.	#	Name	Height	Weight	Year	Hometown
G	12	Jay Burson	6 ft 0 in (1.83 m)	—	Fr	New Concord, Ohio
G/F	32	Dennis Hopson	6 ft 5 in (1.96 m)	200 lb (91 kg)	Jr	Toledo, Ohio
C		Brad Sellers	7 ft 0 in (2.13 m)	210 lb (95 kg)	Sr	Warrensville Heights, Ohio

Head coach

- Eldon Miller

Assistant coach(es)

- Randy Ayers

Legend

- (C) Team captain
- (S) Suspended
- (I) Ineligible
- (W) Walk-on
- Injured
- Current redshirt

== Schedule/results ==
Date time, TV	Rank^{#}	Opponent^{#}	Result	Record	Site (attendance) city, state
Regular Season
Nov 26, 1985*		LIU Brooklyn	W 83–57	1–0	St. John Arena; Columbus, Ohio
Nov 30, 1985*		No. 17 Maryland	W 78–66	2–0	St. John Arena; Columbus, Ohio
Dec 3, 1985*		Florida	W 80–73	3–0	St. John Arena; Columbus, Ohio
Dec 5, 1985*		Akron	W 91–73	4–0	St. John Arena; Columbus, Ohio
Dec 7, 1985*		Cleveland State	W 99–95	5–0	St. John Arena; Columbus, Ohio
Dec 14, 1985*	No. 20	at Arkansas	L 70–79	5–1	Barnhill Arena; Fayetteville, Arkansas
Dec 19, 1985*		Dayton	W 80–73	6–1	St. John Arena; Columbus, Ohio
Dec 29, 1985*		at UTEP; Sun Carnival Classic Tournament	L 57–58	6–2	Special Events Center (11,561); El Paso, Texas
Dec 30, 1985*		vs. Nebraska; Sun Carnival Classic Tournament	L 66–69	6–3	Special Events Center; El Paso, Texas
Jan 2, 1986		Michigan State	W 84–73	7–3 (1–0)	St. John Arena; Columbus, Ohio
Jan 4, 1986		No. 2 Michigan	L 68–78	7–4 (1–1)	St. John Arena; Columbus, Ohio
Jan 9, 1986		at Wisconsin	W 78–61	8–4 (2–1)	Wisconsin Field House; Madison, Wisconsin
Jan 11, 1986		at Northwestern	W 79–77	9–4 (3–1)	Welsh-Ryan Arena; Evanston, Illinois
Jan 15, 1986		at Indiana	L 66–69	9–5 (3–2)	Assembly Hall; Bloomington, Indiana
Jan 18, 1986*		at Boston College	L 74–87	9–6	Roberts Center; Chestnut Hill, Massachusetts
Jan 23, 1986		Illinois	L 65–67	9–7 (3–3)	St. John Arena; Columbus, Ohio
Jan 25, 1986		No. 15 Purdue	W 73–66	10–7 (4–3)	St. John Arena; Columbus, Ohio
Jan 30, 1986		at Minnesota	L 65–70	10–8 (4–4)	Williams Arena; Minneapolis, Minnesota
Feb 1, 1986		at Iowa	L 75–86	10–9 (4–5)	Carver-Hawkeye Arena; Iowa City, Iowa
Feb 6, 1986		Northwestern	W 83–60	11–9 (5–5)	St. John Arena; Columbus, Ohio
Feb 8, 1986		Wisconsin	W 73–71	12–9 (6–5)	St. John Arena; Columbus, Ohio
Feb 16, 1986		No. 16 Indiana	L 75–84	12–10 (6–6)	St. John Arena; Columbus, Ohio
Feb 20, 1986		at Purdue	L 79–85	12–11 (6–7)	Mackey Arena; West Lafayette, Indiana
Feb 22, 1986		at Illinois	L 62–66	12–12 (6–8)	Assembly Hall; Champaign, Illinois
Feb 26, 1986		Iowa	W 81–74	13–12 (7–8)	St. John Arena; Columbus, Ohio
Mar 2, 1986		Minnesota	W 68–55	14–12 (8–8)	St. John Arena; Columbus, Ohio
Mar 6, 1986		at No. 7 Michigan	L 82–99	14–13 (8–9)	Crisler Arena; Ann Arbor, Michigan
Mar 8, 1986		at No. 17 Michigan State	L 81–91	14–14 (8–10)	Jenison Field House; East Lansing, Michigan
National Invitation Tournament
Mar 14, 1986*		at Ohio; First round	W 65–62	15–14	Convocation Center; Athens, Ohio
Mar 17, 1986*		Texas; Second round	W 71–65	16–14	St. John Arena; Columbus, Ohio
Mar 21, 1986*		BYU; Quarterfinals	W 79–68	17–14	St. John Arena; Columbus, Ohio
Mar 24, 1986*		vs. Louisiana Tech; Semifinals	W 79–66	18–14	Madison Square Garden; New York, New York
Mar 26, 1986*		vs. Wyoming; Championship game	W 73–63	19–14	Madison Square Garden; New York, New York
*Non-conference game. ^{#}Rankings from AP Poll. (#) Tournament seedings in parentheses.
