= 1985–86 Michigan Wolverines men's basketball team =

American college basketball season

1985–86 Michigan Wolverines men's basketball

Big Ten champions Maui Invitational Tournament champions

NCAA tournament, Round of 32
- Conference: Big Ten Conference

Ranking
- Coaches: No. 5
- AP: No. 5
- Record: 28–5 (14–4 Big Ten)
- Head coach: Bill Frieder
- Assistant coaches: Mike Boyd; Steve Fisher; David Hammer
- MVP: Roy Tarpley
- Captains: Roy Tarpley; Butch Wade
- Home arena: Crisler Arena

1985–86 Big Ten Conference men's basketball standings
	Conf.				Overall
Team	W		L	PCT	W		L	PCT
No. 5 Michigan	14	–	4	.778	28	–	5	.848
No. 16 Indiana	13	–	5	.722	21	–	8	.724
No. 18 Michigan State	12	–	6	.667	23	–	8	.742
No. 19 Illinois	11	–	7	.611	22	–	10	.688
Purdue	10	–	8	.556	22	–	10	.688
Iowa	10	–	8	.556	20	–	12	.625
Ohio State	8	–	10	.444	19	–	14	.576
Minnesota	5	–	13	.278	15	–	16	.484
Wisconsin	4	–	14	.222	12	–	16	.429
Northwestern	2	–	16	.111	8	–	20	.286
Rankings from AP Poll

The 1985–86 Michigan Wolverines men's basketball team represented the University of Michigan in intercollegiate college basketball during the 1985–86 season. The team played its home games in the Crisler Arena in Ann Arbor, Michigan, and was a member of the Big Ten Conference. Under the direction of head coach Bill Frieder, the team repeated as the Big Ten Conference Champion. The team earned the number two seed in the 1986 NCAA Division I men's basketball tournament where it advanced one round before losing. The team began the season ranked number three and ended the season ranked number five after peaking at number two in the Associated Press Top Twenty Poll. It was ranked in all seventeen weeks, and it also ended the season ranked number five in the final UPI Coaches' Poll. Butch Wade and Roy Tarpley served as team captains and Tarpley earned team MVP.

On December 7, 1985, the team set the current Big Ten Conference single-game record for team blocked shots with 18 against Florida Southern, and Tarpley led the conference with a 2.50 blocked shot average in conference games for the season. The team repeated as scoring margin statistical champion with a 10.6 average in conference games. Additionally, the team led the conference in rebounding average (35.1), rebounding margin (5.8), steals (8.61) and block shots (3.94).

For the second of five consecutive seasons, the team set the school record for single-season field goal percentage with a 51.6% (1049-for-2032) performance. The team also set a school single-season free throw percentage record of 74.8% that would be eclipsed the following season, surpassing the 74.4% set in 1975. Gary Grant's single-season total of 185 assists established a school record that he would surpass two seasons later. It surpassed Antoine Joubert's 164 total set in 1985. His single-season steals total of 84 and average of 2.55 surpassed Rickey Green's 1977 school records, but Grant would better each of these statistics the following year. The team set the school single-season total steals record of 265 that stood until 1994, surpassing the 1977 total of 263. Roy Tarpley surpassed his school single-season blocked shots average record of 2.20 set the prior season with an average of 2.94. He broke his two-year-old single-season total record of 69 with a total of 97. Both records still stand as of 2010. He also set the career blocks average of 2.06 that remained unsurpassed until Chris Webber averaged 2.50 during his career that ended in 1993. His career total of 251 remains unsurpassed. On December 7, 1985, against Florida Southern, Tarpley totaled 10 blocks in a game break his own school single-game record of 7 set the prior year. That night the team totaled 18 blocks. Both numbers are current school records. For the season, the team posted 146 blocks which stood as a school record until 1992. Richard Rellford ended his career with 124 games played, which surpassed Steve Grote's 1977 record of 116. Antoine Joubert would surpass the record the following season. On January 5, 1985, the team began a 24-game home winning streak against Ohio State that continued through a February 15, 1986, victory over Iowa. This stands as the longest home winning streak in school history. The streak ended with a February 20, 1986 74–59 loss to Michigan State. January 12, 1985, victory over Purdue also marked the start of a 10-game road winning streak that continued through a January 4, 1986, victory over Ohio State. This stands as the longest road winning streak in school history. The streak ended with a January 16, 1986 73–63 loss to Minnesota.

In the 64-team NCAA Division I men's basketball tournament, number two seeded Michigan advanced one round by defeating the Akron Zips 70–64. In the second round the team was upset by seven-seeded Iowa State 72–69.

== Schedule ==
Date time, TV	Rank^{#}	Opponent^{#}	Result	Record	Site city, state
Regular Season
Nov 22, 1985*	No. 3	vs. Virginia Tech; Silversword Classic	W 67–66	1–0	Lahaina Civic Center; Lahaina, Hawaii
Nov 23, 1985*	No. 3	vs. Kansas State; Silversword Classic	W 80–58	2–0	Lahaina Civic Center; Lahaina, Hawaiia
Nov 30, 1985*	No. 3	vs. No. 2 Georgia Tech; Hall of Fame Tipoff Classic	W 49–44	3–0	MassMutual Center; Springfield, Massachusetts
Dec 2, 1985*	No. 3	Tennessee	W 87–52	4–0	Crisler Arena; Ann Arbor, Michigan
Dec 4, 1985*	No. 2	Youngstown State	W 56–42	5–0	Crisler Arena; Ann Arbor, Michigan
Dec 7, 1985*	No. 2	Florida Southern	W 91–68	6–0	Crisler Arena; Ann Arbor, Michigan
Dec 9, 1985*	No. 2	Chicago State	W 79–62	7–0	Crisler Arena; Ann Arbor, Michigan
Dec 12, 1985*	No. 2	Central Michigan	W 82–61	8–0	Crisler Arena; Ann Arbor, Michigan
Dec 14, 1985*	No. 2	Western Michigan	W 74–54	9–0	Crisler Arena; Ann Arbor, Michiganri
Dec 21, 1985*	No. 2	Northern Michigan	W 98–76	10–0	Crisler Arena; Ann Arbor, Michigan
Dec 28, 1985*	No. 2	UIC	W 85–54	11–0	Crisler Arena; Ann Arbor, Michigan
Dec 29, 1985*	No. 2	Cleveland State	W 105–85	12–0	Crisler Arena; Ann Arbor, Michigan
Jan 2, 1986	No. 2	at No. 15 Indiana	W 74–69	13–0 (1–0)	Assembly Hall; Bloomington, Indiana
Jan 4, 1986	No. 2	at Ohio State	W 78–68	14–0 (2–0)	St. John Arena; Columbus, Ohio
Jan 8, 1986	No. 2	No. 18 Illinois	W 61–59	15–0 (3–0)	Crisler Arena; Ann Arbor, Michigan
Jan 11, 1986	No. 2	No. 20 Purdue	W 75–71	16–0 (4–0)	Crisler Arena; Ann Arbor, Michigan
Jan 16, 1986	No. 2	at Minnesota	L 63–73	16–1 (4–1)	Williams Arena; Minneapolis, Minnesota
Jan 18, 1986	No. 2	at Iowa	W 61–57	17–1 (5–1)	Carver-Hawkeye Arena; Iowa City, Iowa
Jan 25, 1986	No. 6	at Michigan State	L 79–91	17–2 (5–2)	Jenison Fieldhouse; East Lansing, Michigan
Jan 30, 1986	No. 9	Northwestern	W 82–45	18–2 (6–2)	Crisler Arena; Ann Arbor, Michigan
Feb 1, 1986	No. 9	Wisconsin	W 91–64	19–2 (7–2)	Crisler Arena; Ann Arbor, Michigan
Feb 6, 1986	No. 7	at Purdue	W 80–79	20–2 (8–2)	Mackey Arena; West Lafayette, Indiana
Feb 8, 1986	No. 7	at Illinois	L 79–83 ^{OT}	20–3 (8–3)	Assembly Hall; Champaign, Illinois
Feb 13, 1986	No. 10	Minnesota	W 92–56	21–3 (9–3)	Crisler Arena; Ann Arbor, Michigan
Feb 15, 1986	No. 10	Iowa	W 82–66	22–3 (10–3)	Crisler Arena; Ann Arbor, Michigan
Feb 20, 1986	No. 7	No. 19 Michigan State	L 59–74	22–4 (10–4)	Crisler Arena; Ann Arbor, Michigan
Feb 22, 1986*	No. 7	UAB	W 62–54	23–4	Crisler Arena; Ann Arbor, Michigan
Feb 26, 1986	No. 10	at Wisconsin	W 97–74	24–4 (11–4)	Wisconsin Field House; Madison, Wisconsin
Mar 1, 1986	No. 10	at Northwestern	W 86–64	25–4 (12–4)	Welsh-Ryan Arena; Evanston, Illinois
Mar 6, 1986	No. 7	Ohio State	W 99–82	26–4 (13–4)	Crisler Arena; Ann Arbor, Michigan
Mar 8, 1986	No. 7	No. 16 Indiana	W 80–52	27–4 (14–4)	Crisler Arena; Ann Arbor, Michigan
NCAA tournament
Mar 14, 1986	(2 MW) No. 5	vs. (15 MW) Akron; First round	W 70–64	28–4	Hubert H. Humphrey Metrodome; Minneapolis, Minnesota
Mar 16, 1986	(2 MW) No. 5	vs. (7 MW) Iowa State; Second round	L 69–72	28–5	Hubert H. Humphrey Metrodome; Minneapolis, Minnesota
*Non-conference game. ^{#}Rankings from AP Poll. (#) Tournament seedings in parentheses.

== Rankings ==
Ranking movements Legend: ██ Increase in ranking ██ Decrease in ranking
	Week																
Poll	Pre	1	2	3	4	5	6	7	8	9	10	11	12	13	14	15	Final
AP Poll	3	3	2	2	2	2	2	2	2	6	9	7	10	7	10	7	5

== Team players drafted into the NBA ==
Seven players from this team were selected in the NBA draft.

Year	Round	Pick	Overall	Player	NBA club
1986	1	7	7	Roy Tarpley	Dallas Mavericks
1986	5	2	95	Richard Rellford	Indiana Pacers
1986	6	1	117	Butch Wade	New York Knicks
1986	7	5	144	Robert Henderson	Chicago Bulls
1987	6	20	135	Antoine Joubert	Detroit Pistons
1988	1	15	15	Gary Grant	Seattle SuperSonics
1989	1	4	4	Glen Rice	Miami Heat

== See also ==
- NCAA men's Division I tournament bids by school
- NCAA men's Division I tournament bids by school and conference
- NCAA Division I men's basketball tournament all-time team records
