= 1985–86 Michigan State Spartans men's basketball team =

American college basketball season

1985–86 Michigan State Spartans men's basketball

Lobo Classic champions Spartan Cutlass Classic champions

NCAA tournament, Sweet Sixteen
- Conference: Big Ten Conference

Ranking
- Coaches: No. 18
- AP: No. 18
- Record: 23–8 (12–6 Big Ten)
- Head coach: Jud Heathcote (10th season)
- Assistant coaches: Tom Izzo; Mike Deane; Herb Williams
- Captains: Scott Skiles; Larry Polec
- Home arena: Jenison Field House

1985–86 Big Ten Conference men's basketball standings
	Conf.				Overall
Team	W		L	PCT	W		L	PCT
No. 5 Michigan	14	–	4	.778	28	–	5	.848
No. 16 Indiana	13	–	5	.722	21	–	8	.724
No. 18 Michigan State	12	–	6	.667	23	–	8	.742
No. 19 Illinois	11	–	7	.611	22	–	10	.688
Purdue	10	–	8	.556	22	–	10	.688
Iowa	10	–	8	.556	20	–	12	.625
Ohio State	8	–	10	.444	19	–	14	.576
Minnesota	5	–	13	.278	15	–	16	.484
Wisconsin	4	–	14	.222	12	–	16	.429
Northwestern	2	–	16	.111	8	–	20	.286
Rankings from AP Poll

The 1985–86 Michigan State Spartans men's basketball team represented Michigan State University in the 1985–86 NCAA Division I men's basketball season. The team played their home games at Jenison Field House in East Lansing, Michigan and were members of the Big Ten Conference. They were coached by Jud Heathcote in his 10th year at Michigan State. The Spartans finished with a record of 23–8, 12–6 to finish in third place in Big Ten play. The Spartans received an at-large bid to the NCAA tournament for the second straight year.

As the No. 5 seed in the Midwest region, they defeated Washington and Georgetown to advance to the Sweet Sixteen. There they lost to No. 1-seeded Kansas in Kemper Arena in Kansas City. The game was marred by a time-clock error at the 2:21 mark. With Michigan State leading 76-72, the game was started while the clock did not run, which would extend the game by 15 seconds, despite protests by Heathcote. Kansas would end up winning when they tied the game with 9 seconds remaining in regulation, and then won in overtime, 96-86. The NCAA rules official called it the "most blatant timing error" he had seen in 20 years, adding "they blew it." Kemper Arena upgraded the arena clock after the season.

== Previous season ==
The Spartans finished the 1984–85 season with a record of 19–10, 10–8 to finish in fifth place in Big Ten play. They received an at-large bid to the NCAA tournament as a No. 10 seed. There they lost to UAB in the first round.

== Roster and statistics ==
1985–86 Michigan State Spartans men's basketball team
No	Name	Pos	Year	Height	Pts	Reb	Ast
4	Scott Skiles	G	SR	6–1	27.4	4.4	6.5
13	Darryl Johnson	G	JR	6–2	16.6	3.3	4.0
23	Vernon Carr	F/G	JR	6–6	13.8	5.4	0.7
35	Larry Polec	F	SR	6–8	10.7	5.7	1.6
45	Carlton Valentine	F	SO	6–6	6.0	3.2	0.2
42	Todd Wolfe	G/F	FR	6–5	4.0	1.0	0.0
15	Ralph Walker	F	SR	6–8	2.8	2.8	0.4
40	Barry Fordham	C/F	JR	6–8	2.8	3.7	0.4
24	Mark Brown	G	FR	6–0	2.3	0.5	0.8
34	David Mueller	F/C	FR	6–9	2.1	1.2	0.0
44	Scott Sekal	F	FR	6–8	2.0	0.6	0.0
00	Keith Hill	G	FR	6–4	2.0	0.0	1.0
55	Mario Izzo	C	FR	6–11	0.5	1.1	0.0
30	Jim Sarkine	F	FR	6–9	0.3	0.4	0.1
22	Andre Rison	G	FR	6–0	0.0	0.2	0.7

== Schedule and results ==
Date time, TV	Rank^{#}	Opponent^{#}	Result	Record	Site city, state
Non-conference regular season
Nov 23, 1985*		Western Illinois	W 98–63	1–0	Jenison Field House; East Lansing, MI
Nov 26, 1985*		Maine	W 89–58	2–0	Jenison Field House; East Lansing, MI
Mar 4, 1986*		Central Michigan; Spartan Cutlass Classic semifinals	W 103–60	20–6	Jenison Field House; East Lansing, MI
Nov 30, 1985*		Western Michigan; Spartan Cutlass Classic championship	W 84–64	3–0	Jenison Field House; East Lansing, MI
Dec 4, 1985*		George Washington	W 87–61	4–0	Jenison Field House; East Lansing, MI
Dec 6, 1985*		Canisius	W 90–61	5–0	Jenison Field House; East Lansing, MI
Dec 14, 1985*		at Iowa State	L 80–82 ^{OT}	5–1	James H. Hilton Coliseum; Ames, IA
Dec 21, 1985*		Illinois-Chicago	W 99–74	6–1	Jenison Field House; East Lansing, MI
Dec 27, 1985*		vs. Massachusetts; Lobo Classic semifinals	W 93–45	7–1	The Pit/University Arena; Albuquerque, NM
Dec 28, 1985*		at New Mexico; Lobo Classic championship	W 76–61	8–1	The Pit/University Arena; Albuquerque, NM
Big Ten regular season
Jan 2, 1986		at Ohio State	L 73–84	8–2 (0–1)	St. John Arena; Columbus, OH
Jan 5, 1986		at No. 15 Indiana	W 77–74	9–2 (1–1)	Assembly Hall; Bloomington, IN
Jan 9, 1986		No. 20 Purdue	L 83–88	9–3 (1–2)	Jenison Field House; East Lansing, MI
Jan 12, 1986		No. 18 Illinois	W 58–51	10–3 (2–2)	Jenison Field House; East Lansing, MI
Jan 16, 1986		at Iowa	L 71–82	10–4 (2–3)	Carver-Hawkeye Arena; Iowa City, IA
Jan 18, 1986		at Minnesota	L 71–76	10–5 (2–4)	Williams Arena; Minneapolis, MN
Jan 25, 1986		No. 6 Michigan; Rivalry	W 91–79	11–5 (3–4)	Jenison Field House; East Lansing, MI
Jan 30, 1986		Wisconsin	W 83–81	12–5 (4–4)	Jenison Field House; East Lansing, MI
Feb 1, 1986		Northwestern	W 97–69	13–5 (5–4)	Jenison Field House; East Lansing, MI
Feb 6, 1986		at Illinois	W 84–80	14–5 (6–4)	Assembly Hall; Champaign, IL
Feb 8, 1986		at Purdue	L 82–88	14–6 (6–5)	Mackey Arena; West Lafayette, IN
Feb 13, 1986		Iowa	W 83–73	15–6 (7–5)	Jenison Field House; East Lansing, MI
Feb 15, 1986		Minnesota	W 76–66	16–6 (8–5)	Jenison Field House; East Lansing, MI
Feb 20, 1986	No. 19	No. 7 Michigan; Rivalry	W 74–59	17–6 (9–5)	Crisler Arena; Ann Arbor, MI
Feb 27, 1986	No. 17	at Northwestern	W 82–48	18–6 (10–5)	Welsh-Ryan Arena; Evanston, IL
Mar 2, 1986	No. 17	at Wisconsin	W 84–71	19–6 (11–5)	Wisconsin Field House; Madison, WI
Mar 5, 1986	No. 17	No. 16 Indiana	L 79–97	20–7 (11–6)	Jenison Field House; East Lansing, MI
Mar 8, 1986	No. 17	Ohio State	W 91–81	21–7 (12–6)	Jenison Field House; East Lansing, MI
NCAA Tournament
Mar 13, 1986	(5 MW) No. 18	vs. (12 MW) Washington; First Round	W 72–70	22–7	University of Dayton Arena; Dayton, OH
Mar 15,1986	(5 MW) No. 18	vs. (4 MW) No. 13 Georgetown; Second Round	W 80–68	23–7	University of Dayton Arena; Dayton, OH
Mar 21, 1986	(5 MW) No. 18	vs. (1 MW) No. 2 Kansas; Sweet Sixteen	L 86–96 ^{OT}	23–8	Kemper Arena; Kansas City, MO
*Non-conference game. ^{#}Rankings from AP Poll,. (#) Tournament seedings in parentheses. All times are in Central Time.

== Awards and honors ==
- Scott Skiles – All-Big Ten First Team
