= 1985–86 Illinois Fighting Illini men's basketball team =

American college basketball season

1985–86 Illinois Fighting Illini men's basketball

Illini Classic, Champion

NCAA men's Division I tournament, second round
- Conference: Big Ten Conference

Ranking
- Coaches: No. 20
- AP: No. 19
- Record: 22–10 (11–7 Big Ten)
- Head coach: Lou Henson (11th season)
- Assistant coaches: Dick Nagy (7th season); Jimmy Collins (3rd season); Mark Coomes (1st season)
- MVP: Ken Norman
- Captains: Bruce Douglas; Efrem Winters
- Home arena: Assembly Hall

1985–86 Big Ten Conference men's basketball standings
	Conf.				Overall
Team	W		L	PCT	W		L	PCT
No. 5 Michigan	14	–	4	.778	28	–	5	.848
No. 16 Indiana	13	–	5	.722	21	–	8	.724
No. 18 Michigan State	12	–	6	.667	23	–	8	.742
No. 19 Illinois	11	–	7	.611	22	–	10	.688
Purdue	10	–	8	.556	22	–	10	.688
Iowa	10	–	8	.556	20	–	12	.625
Ohio State	8	–	10	.444	19	–	14	.576
Minnesota	5	–	13	.278	15	–	16	.484
Wisconsin	4	–	14	.222	12	–	16	.429
Northwestern	2	–	16	.111	8	–	20	.286
Rankings from AP Poll

The 1985–86 Illinois Fighting Illini men's basketball team represented the University of Illiniois.

== Regular season ==
Junior college transfer Ken Norman highlighted the 1985–86 season as he set the school record for single-season field-goal percentage (.641).

=== Roster ===
1985–86 Illinois Fighting Illini men's basketball team
Players
Coaches

Pos.	#	Name	Height	Weight	Year	Previous school	Hometown
G	10	Tony Wysinger	5 ft 10 in (1.78 m)	155 lb (70 kg)	Jr	Peoria Central High School	Peoria, Illinois
G	12	Chuck Keller	5 ft 10 in (1.78 m)	145 lb (66 kg)	Sr	Effingham High School	Effingham, Illinois
G	21	Glynn Blackwell	6 ft 4 in (1.93 m)	175 lb (79 kg)	So	Highland Park Community High School	Highland Park, Michigan
G	22	Doug Altenberger (injured) (redshirt)	6 ft 4 in (1.93 m)	200 lb (91 kg)	Sr	Richwoods High School	Peoria, Illinois
G	23	Curtis Taylor	6 ft 1 in (1.85 m)	170 lb (77 kg)	Fr	Fowler High School	Syracuse, New York
F	24	Efrem Winters (C)	6 ft 9 in (2.06 m)	235 lb (107 kg)	Sr	King High School	Chicago, Illinois
G	25	Bruce Douglas (C)	6 ft 3 in (1.91 m)	195 lb (88 kg)	Sr	Quincy Senior High School	Quincy, Illinois
F/C	30	Scott Meents	6 ft 10 in (2.08 m)	230 lb (104 kg)	Sr	Herscher High School	Kankakee, Illinois
F	33	Ken Norman	6 ft 8 in (2.03 m)	215 lb (98 kg)	Jr	Crane High School	Chicago, Illinois
G	34	Dave Wells	6 ft 5 in (1.96 m)	200 lb (91 kg)	Jr	Freeport High School	Freeport, Illinois
G	35	Reggie Woodward	6 ft 2 in (1.88 m)	190 lb (86 kg)	Sr	King High School	Chicago, Illinois
C	40	Olaf Blab	7 ft 0 in (2.13 m)	235 lb (107 kg)	RS Fr	Charleston High School	Munich, West Germany
F	42	Jim Green	6 ft 4 in (1.93 m)	190 lb (86 kg)	So	Academy of Our Lady/Spalding Institute	Morton, Illinois
F	44	Anthony Welch	6 ft 9 in (2.06 m)	200 lb (91 kg)	RS Sr	Creston High School	Grand Rapids, Michigan
F	45	Lowell Hamilton	6 ft 7 in (2.01 m)	195 lb (88 kg)	Fr	Providence St. Mel High School	Chicago, Illinois
C	54	Jens Kujawa	7 ft 0 in (2.13 m)	235 lb (107 kg)	RS Fr	Taylorville High School	Braunschweig, West Germany

Head coach

- Lou Henson (New Mexico State University) (11th year)

Assistant coach(es)

- Jimmy Collins (New Mexico State) (3rd year)
- Dick Nagy (Hardin-Simmons University) (7th year)
- Mark Coomes (New Mexico State) (1st year)

Legend

- (C) Team captain
- (S) Suspended
- (I) Ineligible
- (W) Walk-on
- Injured
- Current redshirt

Roster

== Schedule ==
Date time, TV	Rank^{#}	Opponent^{#}	Result	Record	Site (attendance) city, state
Non-Conference regular season
11/26/1985*	No. 7	Loyola (Chicago)	W 95–64	1–0	Assembly Hall (13,143); Champaign, IL
11/26/1985*	No. 7	Hawaii Loa; Hawaii Thanksgiving Invitational	W 72–45	2–0	Kaneohe Armory (200); Honolulu, HI
11/29/1985*	No. 7	vs. No. 13 Oklahoma; Hawaii Thanksgiving Invitational	L 57–59	2–1	Kaneohe Armory (300); Honolulu, HI
12/4/1985*	No. 12	Wisconsin-Green Bay	W 84–34	3–1	Assembly Hall (13,417); Champaign, IL
12/6/1985*	No. 12	Eastern Kentucky; Illini Classic	W 79–56	4–1	Assembly Hall (13,707); Champaign
12/7/1985*	No. 12	Utah State; Illini Classic	W 115–64	5–1	Assembly Hall (13,980); Champaign
12/10/1985*	No. 10	vs. Tennessee	L 51–54	5–2	Mabee Center (12,700); Tulsa, OK
12/14/1985*	No. 10	Houston	W 102–92	6–2	Assembly Hall (15,564); Champaign, IL
12/21/1985*	No. 15	vs. Missouri; Braggin' Rights	W 67–55	7–2	St. Louis Arena (13,106); St. Louis, MO
12/23/1985*	No. 15	Howard	W 67–55	8–2	Assembly Hall (10,043); Champaign, IL
12/30/1985*	No. 16	vs. Iowa State	W 64–62	9–2	Rosemont Horizon (9,876); Rosemont, IL
Big Ten regular season
1/2/1986	No. 14	Minnesota	W 76–57	10–2 (1–0)	Assembly Hall (13,329); Champaign, IL
1/4/1986	No. 14	Iowa; Rivalry	L 59–60	10–3 (1–1)	Assembly Hall (16,676); Champaign, IL
1/8/1986	No. 18	at No. 2 Michigan	L 59–61	10–4 (1–2)	Crisler Arena (13,609); Ann Arbor, MI
1/12/1986	No. 18	at Michigan State	L 51–58	10–5 (1–3)	Jenison Fieldhouse (7,912); East Lansing, MI
1/16/1986		Wisconsin	W 73–54	11–5 (2–3)	Assembly Hall (12,829); Champaign, IL
1/18/1986		Northwestern; Rivalry	W 72–46	12–5 (3–3)	Assembly Hall (13,891); Champaign, IL
1/23/1986		at Ohio State	W 67–65	13–5 (4–3)	St. John Arena (13,071); Columbus, OH
1/25/1986		at Indiana; Rivalry	L 69–71	13–6 (4–4)	Assembly Hall (17,128); Bloomington, IN
2/2/1986		Purdue	W 80–68	14–6 (5–4)	Assembly Hall (16,412); Champaign, IL
2/6/1986		Michigan State	L 80–84	14–7 (5–5)	Assembly Hall (15,947); Champaign, IL
2/8/1986		Michigan	W 83–79 ^{ot}	15–7 (6–5)	Assembly Hall (16,353); Champaign, IL
2/13/1986		at Northwestern; Rivalry	W 75–52	16–7 (7–5)	Welsh-Ryan Arena (8,117); Evanston, IL
2/15/1986		at Wisconsin	W 82–74	17–7 (8–5)	Wisconsin Field House (10,605); Madison, WI
2/20/1986		No. 15 Indiana; Rivalry	L 60–61	17–8 (8–6)	Assembly Hall (16,349); Champaign, IL
2/22/1986		Ohio State	W 66–62	18–8 (8–7)	Assembly Hall (16,376); Champaign, IL
2/27/1986		at No. 20 Purdue	W 81–72	19–8 (9–7)	Mackey Arena (14,123); West Lafayette, IN
3/1/1986*	No. 12	at No. 4 Georgia Tech	W 59–57	20–8	Alexander Memorial Coliseum (15,148); Atlanta, GA
3/6/1986	No. 19	at Iowa; Rivalry	L 53–57	20–9 (10–7)	Carver–Hawkeye Arena (15,450); Iowa City, IA
3/8/1986	No. 19	at Minnesota	W 73–64	21–9 (11–7)	Williams Arena (13,608); Minneapolis, MN
NCAA Tournament
3/14/1986*	(4 S) No. 19	vs. (13 S) Fairfield; First Round	W 75–51	22–9	Charlotte Coliseum (–); Charlotte, NC
3/16/1986*	(4 S) No. 19	vs. (5 S) Alabama; Second Round	L 56–58	22–10	Charlotte Coliseum (11,325); Charlotte, NC
*Non-conference game. ^{#}Rankings from AP Poll. (#) Tournament seedings in parentheses. All times are in Central Time.

== Player stats ==
Player	Games Played	Minutes Played	Field Goals	Free Throws	Rebounds	Assists	Blocks	Steals	Points
Ken Norman	32	1015	216	93	226	32	25	24	525
Anthony Welch	32	931	162	22	147	49	12	18	334
Efrem Winters	32	944	124	48	183	40	19	15	296
Bruce Douglas	32	1070	118	47	88	199	10	88	283
Tony Wysinger	28	717	115	39	41	106	2	39	269
Glynn Blackwell	32	650	94	18	63	53	0	37	206
Scott Meents	32	507	77	24	89	46	22	17	178
Lowell Hamilton	24	182	36	16	41	4	6	4	88
Curtis Taylor	18	139	15	24	20	14	1	9	54
Jens Kujawa	18	97	19	4	44	4	5	2	42
Doug Altenberger	5	68	10	0	10	3	0	3	20
Olaf Blab	13	49	7	1	8	2	6	1	15
Reggie Woodward	4	20	1	7	1	1	0	2	9
Charles Keller	12	25	1	5	1	1	0	1	54
Brian Sterrett	2	5	1	0	1	0	0	0	2
Dave Wells	1	2	0	2	0	0	1	0	2
Jim Green	2	3	0	0	0	0	0	0	0

== Awards and honors ==
- Bruce Douglas
  - Big Ten Defensive Player of the Year
  - Fighting Illini All-Century team (2005)
- Ken Norman
  - Team Most Valuable Player
  - Fighting Illini All-Century team (2005)

== Team players drafted into the NBA ==
Player	NBA club	Round	Pick
Bruce Douglas	Sacramento Kings	3	57
Anthony Welch	Dallas Mavericks	3	62
Scott Meents	Chicago Bulls	4	74
Efrem Winters	Atlanta Hawks	4	88
