= 1985–86 Iowa Hawkeyes men's basketball team =

American college basketball season

1985–86 Iowa Hawkeyes men's basketball

NCAA men's Division I tournament
- Conference: Big Ten Conference
- Record: 20–12 (10–8 Big Ten)
- Head coach: George Raveling (3rd season)
- Assistant coaches: Brian Hammel; Mike Dunlap
- MVP: Andre Banks
- Home arena: Carver-Hawkeye Arena (Capacity: 15,500)

1985–86 Big Ten Conference men's basketball standings
	Conf.				Overall
Team	W		L	PCT	W		L	PCT
No. 5 Michigan	14	–	4	.778	28	–	5	.848
No. 16 Indiana	13	–	5	.722	21	–	8	.724
No. 18 Michigan State	12	–	6	.667	23	–	8	.742
No. 19 Illinois	11	–	7	.611	22	–	10	.688
Purdue	10	–	8	.556	22	–	10	.688
Iowa	10	–	8	.556	20	–	12	.625
Ohio State	8	–	10	.444	19	–	14	.576
Minnesota	5	–	13	.278	15	–	16	.484
Wisconsin	4	–	14	.222	12	–	16	.429
Northwestern	2	–	16	.111	8	–	20	.286
Rankings from AP Poll

The 1985–86 Iowa Hawkeyes men's basketball team represented the University of Iowa as members of the Big Ten Conference. The team was led by third-year head coach George Raveling and played their home games at Carver-Hawkeye Arena. They finished the season 20–12 overall and 10–8 in Big Ten play. The Hawkeyes received an at-large bid to the NCAA tournament as #11 seed in the Midwest Region, losing in the first round to the NC State Wolfpack.

== Roster ==
1985–86 Iowa Hawkeyes men's basketball team
Players
Coaches

Pos.	#	Name	Height	Weight	Year	Hometown
F/C	3	Gerry Wright	6 ft 7 in (2.01 m)	—	Jr	San Bernardino, California
G	4	Andre Banks	6 ft 4 in (1.93 m)	—	Sr	Chicago, Illinois
G	5	Bart Casey	6 ft 5 in (1.96 m)	—	So	Iowa City, Iowa
G	10	B. J. Armstrong	6 ft 2 in (1.88 m)	—	Fr	Bloomfield Hills, Michigan
G	11	Michael Reaves	6 ft 3 in (1.91 m)	—	So	Milledgeville, Georgia
G/F	14	Bill Jones	6 ft 7 in (2.01 m)	—	So	Detroit, Michigan
G	20	Jeff Moe	6 ft 3 in (1.91 m)	—	So	Indianapolis, Indiana
G/F	23	Roy Marble	6 ft 6 in (1.98 m)	—	Fr	Flint, Michigan
G	24	Michael Morgan	6 ft 3 in (1.91 m)	—	So	Haughton, Louisiana
F	25	Ed Horton	6 ft 8 in (2.03 m)	—	Fr	Springfield, Illinois
G/F	35	Kevin Gamble	6 ft 5 in (1.96 m)	—	Jr	Springfield, Illinois
F	40	Kent Hill	6 ft 6 in (1.98 m)	—	So	Wichita, Kansas
F	44	Al Lorenzen	6 ft 9 in (2.06 m)	—	So	Cedar Rapids, Iowa
F/C	54	Brad Lohaus	6 ft 11 in (2.11 m)	—	RS Jr	Phoenix, Arizona

Head coach

- George Raveling (Villanova)

Assistant coach(es)

Legend

- (C) Team captain
- (S) Suspended
- (I) Ineligible
- (W) Walk-on
- Injured
- Current redshirt

== Schedule/results ==
Date time, TV	Rank^{#}	Opponent^{#}	Result	Record	Site city, state
Non-conference regular season
Nov 22, 1985*		at Hawaii-Hilo	W 80–69	1–0	Hilo, HI
Nov 23, 1985*		vs. Hawaii Pacific	W 85–68	2–0	Neal S. Blaisdell Center; Honolulu, HI
Nov 24, 1985*		vs. Arkansas-Little Rock	W 108–99	3–0	Neal S. Blaisdell Center; Honolulu, HI
Nov 30, 1985*		Abilene Christian	W 92–62	4–0	Carver-Hawkeye Arena; Iowa City, IA
Dec 3, 1985*	No. 18	at Drake; Iowa Big Four	W 55–43	5–0	Veterans Memorial Auditorium; Des Moines, IA
Dec 6, 1985*	No. 18	Arkansas State; Amana-Hawkeye Classic	L 62–66	5–1	Carver-Hawkeye Arena; Iowa City, IA
Dec 7, 1985*	No. 18	Lehigh; Amana-Hawkeye Classic	W 89–68	6–1	Carver-Hawkeye Arena; Iowa City, IA
Dec 10, 1985*		at No. 20 Iowa State; Rivalry	L 61–74	6–2	Hilton Coliseum; Ames, IA
Dec 14, 1985*		Furman	W 81–61	7–2	Carver-Hawkeye Arena; Iowa City, IA
Dec 23, 1985*		at Gonzaga	W 55–43	8–2	The Kennel; Spokane, WA
Dec 27, 1985*		vs. Tampa; Fred Meyer Far West Classic	W 54–45	9–2	Gill Coliseum; Corvallis, OR
Dec 28, 1985*		vs. Boston University; Fred Meyer Far West Classic	W 76–71	10–2	Gill Coliseum; Corvallis, OR
Dec 29, 1985*		vs. Saint Joseph's; Fred Meyer Far West Classic	L 56–60	10–3	Gill Coliseum; Corvallis, OR
Big Ten Regular Season
Jan 2, 1986		at Purdue	L 73–76	10–4 (0–1)	Mackey Arena; West Lafayette, IN
Jan 4, 1986		at No. 14 Illinois	W 60–59	11–4 (1–1)	Assembly Hall; Champaign, IL
Jan 11, 1986		Minnesota	W 75–62	12–4 (2–1)	Carver-Hawkeye Arena; Iowa City, IA
Jan 16, 1986		Michigan State	W 82–71	13–4 (3–1)	Carver-Hawkeye Arena; Iowa City, IA
Jan 18, 1986		No. 2 Michigan	L 57–61	13–5 (3–2)	Carver-Hawkeye Arena; Iowa City, IA
Jan 23, 1986		at Northwestern	W 76–43	14–5 (4–2)	Welsh-Ryan Arena; Evanston, IL
Jan 25, 1986		at Wisconsin	L 63–69	14–6 (4–3)	Wisconsin Field House; Madison, WI
Jan 30, 1986		No. 15 Indiana	W 79–69	15–6 (5–3)	Carver-Hawkeye Arena
Feb 1, 1986		Ohio State	W 86–75	16–6 (6–3)	Carver-Hawkeye Arena; Iowa City, IA
Feb 9, 1986		at Minnesota	L 60–65	16–7 (6–4)	Williams Arena; Minneapolis, MN
Feb 13, 1986		at Michigan State	L 73–83	16–8 (6–5)	Jenison Fieldhouse; East Lansing, MI
Feb 15, 1986		at No. 10 Michigan	L 66–82	16–9 (6–6)	Crisler Arena; Ann Arbor, MI
Feb 20, 1986		Wisconsin	W 101–48	17–9 (7–6)	Carver-Hawkeye Arena; Iowa City, IA
Feb 22, 1986		Northwestern	W 76–45	18–9 (8–6)	Carver-Hawkeye Arena; Iowa City, IA
Feb 26, 1986		at Ohio State	L 74–81	18–10 (8–7)	St. John Arena; Columbus, OH
Mar 2, 1986		at No. 16 Indiana	L 73–80	18–11 (8–8)	Assembly Hall; Bloomington, IN
Mar 6, 1986		No. 19 Illinois	W 57–53	19–11 (9–8)	Carver-Hawkeye Arena; Iowa City, IA
Mar 8, 1986		Purdue	W 77–64	20–11 (10–8)	Carver-Hawkeye Arena; Iowa City, IA
NCAA tournament
Mar 14, 1986*	(11 MW)	vs. (6 MW) No. 20 NC State; First Round	L 64–66	20–12	Hubert H. Humphrey Metrodome; Minneapolis, MN
*Non-conference game. ^{#}Rankings from AP Poll. (#) Tournament seedings in parentheses. MW=Midwest.
