= 1985–86 Indiana Hoosiers men's basketball team =

American college basketball season

1985–86 Indiana Hoosiers men's basketball

NCAA men's Division I tournament, Round of 64
- Conference: Big Ten Conference

Ranking
- Coaches: No. 14
- AP: No. 16
- Record: 21–8 (13–5 Big Ten)
- Head coach: Bobby Knight (15th season)
- Assistant coaches: Ron Felling; Kohn Smith; Royce Waltman; Joby Wright
- Captains: Steve Alford; Winston Morgan; Stew Robinson
- Home arena: Assembly Hall

1985–86 Big Ten Conference men's basketball standings
	Conf.				Overall
Team	W		L	PCT	W		L	PCT
No. 5 Michigan	14	–	4	.778	28	–	5	.848
No. 16 Indiana	13	–	5	.722	21	–	8	.724
No. 18 Michigan State	12	–	6	.667	23	–	8	.742
No. 19 Illinois	11	–	7	.611	22	–	10	.688
Purdue	10	–	8	.556	22	–	10	.688
Iowa	10	–	8	.556	20	–	12	.625
Ohio State	8	–	10	.444	19	–	14	.576
Minnesota	5	–	13	.278	15	–	16	.484
Wisconsin	4	–	14	.222	12	–	16	.429
Northwestern	2	–	16	.111	8	–	20	.286
Rankings from AP Poll

The 1985–86 Indiana Hoosiers men's basketball team represented Indiana University. Their head coach was Bobby Knight, who was in his 15th year. The team played its home games in Assembly Hall in Bloomington, Indiana, and was a member of the Big Ten Conference.

The Hoosiers finished the regular season with an overall record of 21–8 and a conference record of 13–5, finishing 2nd in the Big Ten Conference. IU was invited to participate in the 1986 NCAA tournament as a 3-seed; however, IU made a quick exit with a first-round loss to 14-seed Cleveland State.

The season was memorialized and popularized by A Season on the Brink, a 1986 book by John Feinstein.

== Roster ==
No.	Name	Position	Ht.	Year	Hometown
11	Todd Jadlow	F/C	6–9	So.	Salina, Kansas
12	Steve Alford	G	6–2	Jr.	New Castle, Indiana
14	Magnus Pelkowski	C	6–10	RS So.	Bogotá, Colombia
20	Ricky Calloway	G/F	6–6	Fr.	Cincinnati, Ohio
21	Winston Morgan	G/F	6–5	Sr.	Anderson, Indiana
22	Stew Robinson	G	6–1	Sr.	Anderson, Indiana
23	Delray Brooks	G	6–4	So.	Michigan City, Indiana
24	Daryl Thomas	F/C	6–7	Jr.	Westchester, Illinois
30	Todd Meier	F/C	6–8	Jr.	Oshkosh, Wisconsin
32	Steve Eyl	F	6–6	So.	Hamilton, Ohio
34	Andre Harris	F	6–6	Jr.	Grand Rapids, Michigan
35	Jeff Oliphant	G	6–5	RS Fr.	Lyons, Indiana
42	Kreigh Smith	G/F	6–7	RS So.	Tipton, Indiana
44	Joe Hillman	G	6–2	RS So.	Glendale, California
45	Brian Sloan	F/C	6–8	RS So.	McLeansboro, Illinois
52	Courtney Witte	F/C	6–8	Sr.	Vincennes, Indiana

== Schedule/results ==
Date time, TV	Rank^{#}	Opponent^{#}	Result	Record	Site city, state
Regular season
11/30/1985*		Kent State	W 89–73	1–0	Assembly Hall; Bloomington, IN
12/3/1985*	No. 19	No. 11 Notre Dame	W 82–67	2–0	Assembly Hall; Bloomington, IN
12/7/1985*	No. 19	at No. 9 Kentucky; Indiana–Kentucky rivalry	L 58–63	2–1	Rupp Arena; Lexington, KY
12/10/1985*	No. 18	Kansas State	W 78–71	3–1	Assembly Hall; Bloomington, IN
12/13/1985*	No. 18	Louisiana Tech; Indiana Classic	W 84–63	4–1	Assembly Hall; Bloomington, IN
12/14/1985*	No. 18	Texas Tech; Indiana Classic	W 74–59	5–1	Assembly Hall; Bloomington, IN
12/18/1985*	No. 17	at No. 16 Louisville	L 63–65	5–2	Freedom Hall; Louisville, KY
12/21/1985*	No. 17	Iowa State	W 86–65	6–2	Assembly Hall; Bloomington, IN
12/27/1985*	No. 17	vs. Idaho; Hoosier Classic	W 87–57	7–2	Market Square Arena; Indianapolis, IN
12/28/1985*	No. 17	vs. Mississippi State; Hoosier Classic	W 74–73	8–2	Market Square Arena; Indianapolis, IN
1/2/1986	No. 15	No. 2 Michigan	L 69–74	8–3 (0–1)	Assembly Hall; Bloomington, IN
1/5/1986	No. 15	Michigan State	L 74–77	8–4 (0–2)	Assembly Hall; Bloomington, IN
1/9/1986		at Northwestern	W 102–65	9–4 (1–2)	Welsh-Ryan Arena; Evanston, IL
1/11/1986		at Wisconsin	W 80–69	10–4 (2–2)	Wisconsin Field House; Madison, WI
1/15/1986		Ohio State	W 69–66	11–4 (3–2)	Assembly Hall; Bloomington, IN
1/23/1986		No. 15 Purdue; Rivalry	W 71–70	12–4 (4–2)	Assembly Hall; Bloomington, IN
1/25/1986		Illinois; Rivalry	W 71–69	13–4 (5–2)	Assembly Hall; Bloomington, IN
1/30/1986	No. 15	at Iowa	L 69–79	13–5 (5–3)	Carver-Hawkeye Arena; Iowa City, IA
2/1/1986	No. 15	at Minnesota	W 62–54	14–5 (6–3)	Williams Arena; Minneapolis, MN
2/6/1986	No. 18	Wisconsin	W 78–69	15–5 (7–3)	Assembly Hall; Bloomington, IN
2/8/1986	No. 18	Northwestern	W 77–52	16–5 (8–3)	Assembly Hall; Bloomington, IN
2/16/1986	No. 16	at Ohio State	W 84–75	17–5 (9–3)	St. John Arena; Columbus, OH
2/20/1986	No. 15	at Illinois; Rivalry	W 61–60	18–5 (10–3)	Assembly Hall; Champaign, IL
2/23/1986	No. 15	at Purdue; Rivalry	L 68–85	18–6 (10–4)	Mackey Arena; West Lafayette, IN
2/27/1986	No. 16	Minnesota	W 95–63	19–6 (11–4)	Assembly Hall; Bloomington, IN
3/2/1986	No. 16	Iowa	W 80–73	20–6 (12–4)	Assembly Hall; Bloomington, IN
3/5/1986; Lorimar	No. 16	at No. 17 Michigan State	W 97–79	21–6 (13–4)	Jenison Fieldhouse; East Lansing, MI
3/8/1986; CBS	No. 16	at No. 7 Michigan	L 52–80	21–7 (13–5)	Crisler Arena; Ann Arbor, MI
NCAA tournament
3/13/1986*; NCAA/ESPN	(3 E) No. 16	vs. (14 E) Cleveland State; First Round	L 79–83	21–8	Carrier Dome; Syracuse, NY
*Non-conference game. ^{#}Rankings from AP Poll. (#) Tournament seedings in parentheses.
