= 1985–86 NCAA Division I men's basketball rankings =

- Season: 1985–86
- NCAA Tournament: 1986
- Preseason No. 1: Georgia Tech
- NCAA Tournament Champions: Louisville
NCAA Division I men's basketball rankings


The 1985–86 NCAA Division I men's preseason basketball rankings was made up of two human polls, the AP Poll and the Coaches Poll, in addition to various other preseason polls. The Louisville Cardinals would finish the season ranked at the top of both polls after winning the National Championship.

== Legend ==
	Increase in ranking
	Decrease in ranking
	New to rankings from previous week
Italics	Number of first place votes
(#–#)	Win–loss record
т	Tied with team above or below also with this symbol

== AP Poll ==
	Preseason	Week 1 Nov. 25	Week 2 Dec. 2	Week 3 Dec. 9	Week 4 Dec. 16	Week 5 Dec. 23	Week 6 Dec. 30	Week 7 Jan. 6	Week 8 Jan. 13	Week 9 Jan. 20	Week 10 Jan. 27	Week 11 Feb. 3	Week 12 Feb. 10	Week 13 Feb. 17	Week 14 Feb. 24	Week 15 Mar. 3	Final Mar. 10	
1.	Georgia Tech	North Carolina (1–0)	North Carolina (5–0) (45)	North Carolina (6–0) (47)	North Carolina (7–0) (45)	North Carolina (10–0)	North Carolina (12–0)	North Carolina (14–0)	North Carolina (16–0)	North Carolina (19–0)	North Carolina (21–0)	North Carolina (22–1)	North Carolina (24–1)	North Carolina (25–1)	Duke (27–2)	Duke (29–2) (62)	Duke (32–2)	1.
2.	North Carolina	Georgia Tech (0–0)	Michigan (4–0) (12)	Michigan (6–0) (13)	Michigan (9–0) (14)	Michigan (10–0)	Michigan (12–0)	Michigan (14–0)	Michigan (16–0)	Duke (16–1)	Memphis State (20–0)	Georgia Tech (17–2)	Duke (22–2)	Duke (25–2)	Kansas (27–3)	Kansas (28–3) (1)	Kansas (31–3)	2.
3.	Michigan	Michigan (2–0)	Duke (6–0) (4)	Duke (8–0) (4)	Duke (8–0) (4)	Duke (9–0)	Duke (11–0)	Duke (12–0)	Duke (15–0)	Memphis State (17–0)	Georgia Tech (16–2)	Memphis State (20–1)	Kansas (22–3)	Kansas (24–3)	North Carolina (25–3)	Kentucky (26–3)	Kentucky (29–3)	3.
4.	Syracuse	Syracuse (1–0)	Syracuse (3–0)	Syracuse (5–0)	Syracuse (6–0)	Syracuse (7–0)	Syracuse (8–0)	Syracuse (10–0)	Syracuse (13–0)	Georgia Tech (15–1)	Kansas (19–2)	Duke (20–2)	Memphis State (22–2)	Memphis State (23–2)	Georgia Tech (21–4)	North Carolina (26–4)	St. John's (30–4)	4.
5.	Kansas	Kansas (2–0)	Georgia Tech (2–1)	Georgetown (4–0) т (1)	Georgetown (6–0) (1)	Georgetown (8–0)	Kansas (12–1)	Georgia Tech (10–1)	Georgia Tech (14–1)	Oklahoma (17–0)	Duke (18–2)	Oklahoma (20–1)	Georgia Tech (18–4)	Georgia Tech (19–4)	Kentucky (24–3)	St. John's (27–4)	Michigan (27–4)	5.
6.	Duke	Duke (2–0)	Georgetown (2–0) (1)	Georgia Tech (4–1) т	Kansas (8–1)	Kansas (9–1)	Georgia Tech (10–1)	Memphis State (12–0)	Memphis State (15–0)	Michigan (17–1)	Oklahoma (18–1)	Kansas (20–3)	UNLV (24–2)	St. John's (24–3)	Syracuse (22–3)	Georgia Tech (23–5)	Georgia Tech (25–6)	6.
7.	Illinois	Illinois (0–0)	Kansas (3–1)	Kansas (6–1)	Georgia Tech (4–1)	Georgia Tech (7–1)	Oklahoma (11–0)	Oklahoma (13–0)	Oklahoma (15–0)	Kansas (16–2)	St. John's (19–2)	Michigan (19–2)	St. John's (23–3)	Michigan (22–3)	Memphis State (24–3)	Michigan (25–4)	Louisville (26–7)	7.
8.	Georgetown	Georgetown (1–0)	Oklahoma (5–0)	Oklahoma (6–0)	Oklahoma (8–0)	Oklahoma (9–0)	LSU (12–0)	LSU (14–0)	Kansas (14–2)	St. John's (17–2)	Kentucky (16–2)	Syracuse (17–2)	Oklahoma (21–2)	Kentucky (22–3)	St. John's (25–4)	Syracuse (23–4)	North Carolina (26–5)	8.
9.	Louisville	Louisville (2–0)	Kentucky (3–0)	Kentucky (5–0)	LSU (8–0)	LSU (11–0)	Memphis State (11–0)	Kansas (12–2)	St. John's (15–2)	Syracuse (13–2)	Michigan (17–2)	UNLV (21–2)	Georgetown (19–4)	Syracuse (20–3)	UNLV (27–3)	Bradley (29–1)	Syracuse (25–5)	9.
10.	Auburn	Kentucky (1–0)	Notre Dame (2–0) (1)	Illinois (5–1)	Memphis State (7–0)	Memphis State (8–0)	St. John's (12–1)	St. John's (14–1)	UNLV (15–2)	UNLV (17–2)	UNLV (19–2)	St. John's (20–3)	Michigan (20–3)	Oklahoma (23–3)	Michigan (23–4)	Memphis State (25–4)	Notre Dame (23–5)	10.
11.	Kentucky	Notre Dame (1–0)	LSU (5–0)	LSU (6–0)	St. John's (8–1)	St. John's (9–1)	Georgetown (9–1)	Kentucky (10–1)	Kentucky (12–2)	Kentucky (14–2)	Syracuse (15–2)	Georgetown (17–3)	Kentucky (20–3)	UNLV (24–3)	Bradley (28–1)	Louisville (24–7)	UNLV (31–4)	11.
12.	Notre Dame	LSU (1–0)	Illinois (2–1)	Memphis State (5–0)	UNLV (5–1)	UNLV (7–1)	Kentucky (9–1)	UNLV (13–2)	UAB (16–2)	Georgetown (13–3)	Georgetown (16–3)	Kentucky (18–3)	Syracuse (18–3)	Bradley (26–1)	Notre Dame (19–5)	Notre Dame (21–5)	Memphis State (27–5)	12.
13.	Oklahoma	Oklahoma (1–0)	Memphis State (2–0)	UNLV (5–1)	Kentucky (5–1)	Kentucky (7–1)	UNLV (10–2)	Georgetown (10–2)	Notre Dame (9–2)	Louisville (11–4)	Bradley (20–1)	Bradley (22–1)	Bradley (24–1)	Georgetown (19–5)	Louisville (22–7)	UNLV (28–4)	Georgetown (23–7)	13.
14.	LSU	Memphis State (0–0)	UNLV (4–1)	St. John's (6–1)	UAB (8–1)	UAB (11–1)	Illinois (9–2)	UAB (13–2)	LSU (15–2)	LSU (16–2)	Notre Dame (12–3)	Notre Dame (14–3)	Notre Dame (16–4)	Notre Dame (17–5)	Oklahoma (23–6)	Georgetown (22–6)	Bradley (31–2)	14.
15.	Memphis State	NC State (0–0)	St. John's (3–1)	Louisville (3–2)	Illinois (5–2)	Louisville (6–2)	Indiana (8–2)	UTEP (13–1)	Georgetown (11–3)	Purdue (16–3)	Indiana (13–4)	Virginia Tech (18–4)	UTEP (21–3)	Indiana (17–5)	Georgetown (20–6)	Oklahoma (24–6)	Oklahoma (26–8)	15.
16.	UAB	UNLV (1–0)	Louisville (2–2)	UAB (5–1)	Louisville (5–2)	Illinois (7–2)	UAB (12–2)	Notre Dame (7–1)	Virginia Tech (12–2)	Notre Dame (10–2)	Virginia Tech (16–4)	Louisville (13–6)	Indiana (16–5)	Louisville (18–7)	Indiana (18–6)	Indiana (20–6)	Indiana (21–7)	16.
17.	NC State	Maryland (1–0)	UAB (2–1)	Notre Dame (3–1)	Indiana (4–1)	Indiana (6–2)	Notre Dame (6–1)	Louisville (7–3)	UTEP (14–2)	Bradley (18–1)	LSU (16–3)	UTEP (18–3)	NC State (17–6)	Navy (20–4)	Michigan State (18–6)	Michigan State (20–6)	Navy (27–4)	17.
18.	UNLV	St. John's (2–0)	Iowa (4–0)	Indiana (2–1)	DePaul (4–0)	Notre Dame (5–1)	Louisville (6–3)	Illinois (10–3)	Louisville (9–4)	UAB (16–4)	Louisville (11–6)	Indiana (14–5)	Alabama (17–4)	Virginia Tech (19–6)	NC State (18–9)	Navy (25–4)	Michigan State (21–7)	18.
19.	Maryland т	Auburn (0–1)	Auburn (1–1)	DePaul (3–0)	Notre Dame (4–1)	Virginia Tech (8–1)	UTEP (11–1)	Virginia Tech (10–2)	Purdue (14–3)	UTEP (15–3)	UTEP (17–3)	Western Kentucky (17–3)	Louisville (16–7)	Michigan State (17–6)	Navy (23–4)	Illinois (20–8)	Illinois (21–9)	19.
20.	Navy т	UAB (1–1)	Indiana (1–0)	Ohio State (5–0)	Virginia Tech (7–1)	DePaul (6–2)	Virginia Tech (8–2)	Purdue (13–2)	Bradley (16–1)	Virginia Tech (14–3)	Richmond (16–2)	Alabama (15–4)	Virginia Tech (18–6)	NC State (17–8)	Purdue (21–7)	NC State (18–11)	UTEP (27–5)	20.
	Preseason	Week 1 Nov. 25	Week 2 Dec. 2	Week 3 Dec. 9	Week 4 Dec. 16	Week 5 Dec. 23	Week 6 Dec. 30	Week 7 Jan. 6	Week 8 Jan. 13	Week 9 Jan. 20	Week 10 Jan. 27	Week 11 Feb. 3	Week 12 Feb. 10	Week 13 Feb. 17	Week 14 Feb. 24	Week 15 Mar. 3	Final Mar. 10	
		Dropped: Navy	Dropped: NC State; Maryland	Dropped: Iowa; Auburn	Dropped: Ohio State	None	Dropped: DePaul	Dropped: Indiana	Dropped: Illinois	None	Dropped: Purdue (16–5); UAB	Dropped: LSU; Richmond	Dropped: Western Kentucky	Dropped: UTEP (21–5); Alabama (17–6)	Dropped: Virginia Tech	Dropped: Purdue	Dropped: NC State (18–12)	

== Coaches Poll ==
	Preseason	Week 2 Dec. 2	Week 3 Dec. 9	Week 4 Dec. 16	Week 5 Dec. 23	Week 6 Dec. 30	Week 7 Jan. 6	Week 8 Jan. 13	Week 9 Jan. 20	Week 10 Jan. 27	Week 11 Feb. 3	Week 12 Feb. 10	Week 13 Feb. 17	Week 14 Feb. 24	Week 15 Mar. 3	Final Mar. 10	
1.	Michigan	North Carolina (5–0)	North Carolina (6–0)	North Carolina (7–0)	North Carolina (10–0)	North Carolina (12–0)	North Carolina (14–0)	North Carolina (16–0)	North Carolina (19–0)	North Carolina (21–0)	North Carolina (22–1)	North Carolina (24–1)	North Carolina (25–1)	Duke (27–2)	Duke (29–2)	Duke (32–2)	1.
2.	Georgia Tech	Michigan (4–0)	Michigan (6–0)	Michigan (9–0)	Michigan (10–0)	Michigan (12–0)	Michigan (14–0)	Michigan (16–0)	Duke (16–1)	Memphis State (20–0)	Georgia Tech (17–2) т	Duke (22–2)	Duke (25–2)	Kansas (27–3)	Kansas (28–3)	Kansas (31–3)	2.
3.	North Carolina	Duke (6–0)	Duke (8–0)	Duke (8–0)	Duke (9–0)	Duke (11–0)	Duke (12–0)	Duke (15–0)	Georgia Tech (15–1)	Georgia Tech (16–2)	Duke (20–2) т	Kansas (22–3)	Kansas (24–3)	North Carolina (25–3) т	North Carolina (26–4)	St. John's (30–4)	3.
4.	Kansas	Georgia Tech (2–1)	Kansas (6–1)	Kansas (8–1)	Kansas (9–1)	Kansas (12–1)	Syracuse (10–0)	Syracuse (13–0)	Michigan (17–1)	Duke (18–2)	Memphis State (20–1)	UNLV (24–2)	Memphis State (23–2)	Georgia Tech (21–4) т	Kentucky (26–3)	Kentucky (29–3)	4.
5.	Duke	Syracuse (3–0)	Syracuse (5–0)	Syracuse (6–0)	Syracuse (7–0)	Syracuse (8–0)	Georgia Tech (10–1)	Georgia Tech (14–1)	Memphis State (17–0)	Kansas (19–2)	Kansas (20–3)	Georgia Tech (18–4)	Georgia Tech (19–4)	Kentucky (24–3)	St. John's (27–4)	Michigan (27–4)	5.
6.	Syracuse	Kansas (3–1)	Georgia Tech (4–1)	Georgetown (6–0)	Georgia Tech (7–1)	Georgia Tech (10–1)	Memphis State (12–0)	Memphis State (15–0)	Oklahoma (17–0)	Oklahoma (18–1)	Oklahoma (20–1)	Memphis State (22–2)	St. John's (24–3)	Syracuse (22–3)	Georgia Tech (23–5)	Georgia Tech (25–6)	6.
7.	Illinois	Georgetown (2–0)	Georgetown (4–0)	Georgia Tech (4–1)	Georgetown (8–0)	Oklahoma (11–0)	LSU (14–0)	Oklahoma (15–0)	Kansas (16–2)	St. John's (19–2)	Syracuse (17–2)	St. John's (23–3)	Kentucky (22–3)	UNLV (27–3)	Michigan (25–4)	Louisville (26–7)	7.
8.	Georgetown	Kentucky (3–0)	Kentucky (5–0)	Oklahoma (8–0)	LSU (11–0)	St. John's (12–1)	Oklahoma (13–0)	Kansas (14–2)	St. John's (17–2)	Michigan (17–2)	Michigan (19–2)	Kentucky (20–3)	Michigan (22–3)	Memphis State (24–3)	Syracuse (23–4)	North Carolina (26–5)	8.
9.	LSU	UNLV (4–1)	Oklahoma (6–0)	St. John's (8–1)	Oklahoma (9–0)	LSU (12–0)	Kansas (12–2)	St. John's (15–2)	Kentucky (14–2)	Kentucky (16–2)	UNLV (21–2)	Michigan (20–3)	Oklahoma (23–3)	Bradley (28–1)	Bradley (29–1)	Syracuse (25–5)	9.
10.	Louisville	Oklahoma (5–0)	UNLV (5–1)	UNLV (5–1)	Kentucky (7–1)	Kentucky (9–1)	St. John's (14–1)	UNLV (15–2)	UNLV (17–2)	Syracuse (15–2)	St. John's (20–3)	Oklahoma (21–2)	Syracuse (20–3)	St. John's (25–4)	Memphis State (25–4)	UNLV (31–4)	10.
11.	Auburn	LSU (5–0)	Illinois (5–1)	LSU (8–0) т	St. John's (9–1)	Georgetown (9–1)	Kentucky (10–1)	Kentucky (12–2)	Syracuse (13–2)	UNLV (19–2)	Georgetown (17–3)	Georgetown (19–4)	UNLV (24–3)	Michigan (23–4)	UNLV (28–4)	Notre Dame (23–5)	11.
12.	Kentucky	Illinois (2–1)	LSU (6–0)	Memphis State (7–0) т	UNLV (7–1)	Memphis State (11–0)	UNLV (13–2)	UAB (16–2)	Georgetown (13–3)	Georgetown (16–3)	Kentucky (18–3)	Bradley (24–1)	Bradley (26–1)	Notre Dame (19–5)	Louisville (24–7)	Memphis State (27–5)	12.
13.	Notre Dame	Notre Dame (2–0)	St. John's (6–1)	Illinois (5–2)	Memphis State (8–0)	UNLV (10–2)	UAB (13–2)	Notre Dame (9–2)	LSU (16–2)	Bradley (20–1)	Bradley (22–1)	Syracuse (18–3)	Georgetown (19–5)	Oklahoma (23–6)	Notre Dame (21–5)	Bradley (31–2)	13.
14.	NC State т	St. John's (2–0)	Louisville (3–2)	Kentucky (5–1)	Louisville (6–2)	Illinois (9–2)	UTEP (13–1)	LSU (15–2)	Louisville (11–4)	UTEP (17–3)	UTEP (18–3)	Notre Dame (16–4) т	Indiana (17–5)	Louisville (22–7)	Indiana (20–6)	Indiana (21–7)	14.
15.	Iowa т	Louisville (2–2)	Memphis State (5–0)	UAB (8–1)	Illinois (7–2)	Indiana (8–2)	Georgetown (10–2)	UTEP (14–2)	Notre Dame (10–2)	Louisville (11–6)	Virginia Tech (18–4)	UTEP (21–3) т	Notre Dame (17–5)	Georgetown (20–6)	Georgetown (22–6)	Georgetown (23–7)	15.
16.	UAB	Memphis State (2–0)	Notre Dame (3–1) т	Indiana (4–1)	Indiana (6–2)	UTEP (11–1)	Notre Dame (7–1)	Georgetown (11–3)	Purdue (16–3)	Indiana (13–4)	Louisville (13–6)	Indiana (16–5)	Louisville (18–7)	Indiana (18–6)	Oklahoma (24–6)	UTEP (27–5)	16.
17.	Washington	UAB (2–1)	Indiana (2–1) т	Louisville (5–2)	Notre Dame (5–1)	UAB (12–2)	Louisville (7–3)	Purdue (14–3)	Bradley (18–1)	LSU (16–3)	Notre Dame (14–3)	Alabama (17–4)	NC State (17–8)	Michigan State (18–6)	UTEP (24–5)	Oklahoma (26–8)	17.
18.	UNLV	Auburn (1–1)	UAB (5–1)	DePaul (4–0)	DePaul (6–2)	Louisville (6–3)	Purdue (13–2)	Louisville (9–4)	UTEP (15–3)	Notre Dame (12–3)	Indiana (14–5)	NC State (17–6)	Alabama (17–6)	NC State (18–9)	Michigan State (20–6)	Michigan State (21–7)	18.
19.	DePaul	Iowa (4–0)	Ohio State (5–0)	Notre Dame (4–1)	UTEP (8–1)	Notre Dame (6–1)	Illinois (10–3) т	Bradley (16–1)	UAB (16–4)	Virginia Tech (16–4)	NC State (14–6)	Louisville (16–7) т	UTEP (21–5)	Alabama (19–6)	Illinois (20–8)	Alabama (22–8)	19.
20.	UCLA	Indiana (1–0)	DePaul (3–0)	Pepperdine (6–1)	Washington (6–2)	NC State (7–3)	Bradley (12–1) т	Virginia Tech (12–2)	Pepperdine (14–3)	Pepperdine (16–3) т Purdue (16–5) т	Virginia (14–5)	Pepperdine (19–4) т	Pepperdine (20–4)	Pepperdine (22–4)	Pepperdine (24–4)	Illinois (21–9)	20.
	Preseason	Week 2 Dec. 2	Week 3 Dec. 9	Week 4 Dec. 16	Week 5 Dec. 23	Week 6 Dec. 30	Week 7 Jan. 6	Week 8 Jan. 13	Week 9 Jan. 20	Week 10 Jan. 27	Week 11 Feb. 3	Week 12 Feb. 10	Week 13 Feb. 17	Week 14 Feb. 24	Week 15 Mar. 3	Final Mar. 10	
		Dropped: NC State; Washington; DePaul; UCLA	Dropped: Auburn; Iowa	Dropped: Ohio State	Dropped: UAB; Pepperdine	Dropped: DePaul; Washington	Dropped: Indiana; NC State	Dropped: Illinois	Dropped: Virginia Tech (14–3)	Dropped: UAB	Dropped: LSU; Pepperdine (17–4); Purdue	Dropped: Virginia Tech (18–6); Virginia	None	Dropped: UTEP	Dropped: NC State (18–11); Alabama	Dropped: Pepperdine	
