= Ken Norman =

American basketball player (born 1964)

Personal information
- Born: September 5, 1964 (age 62) Chicago, Illinois, U.S.
- Listed height: 6 ft 8 in (2.03 m)
- Listed weight: 215 lb (98 kg)

Career information
- High school: Crane (Chicago, Illinois)
- College: Wabash Valley (1982–1983); Illinois (1984–1987)
- NBA draft: 1987: 1st round, 19th overall pick
- Drafted by: Los Angeles Clippers
- Playing career: 1987–1997
- Position: Small forward
- Number: 33, 3, 4, 5

Career history
- 1987–1993: Los Angeles Clippers
- 1993–1994: Milwaukee Bucks
- 1994–1997: Atlanta Hawks

Career highlights
- Consensus second-team All-American (1987); 2× First-team All-Big Ten (1986, 1987)

Career NBA statistics
- Points: 8,717 (13.5 ppg)
- Rebounds: 3,949 (6.1 rpg)
- Assists: 1,355 (2.1 apg)
- Stats at NBA.com
- Stats at Basketball Reference

Kenneth Darnel Norman (born September 5, 1964) is an American former professional basketball player. After graduating from Crane High School in Chicago, Kenny was an outstanding forward for the Illinois Fighting Illini who was selected 19th overall by the Los Angeles Clippers of the 1987 NBA draft. Norman was elected to the "Illinois Men's Basketball All-Century Team" in 2004. He earned the nickname, "Snake", that he kept throughout his college and professional careers, as a youth playing basketball at Touhy-Herbert Park, on Chicago's West Side.

== NBA career ==
=== Los Angeles Clippers ===
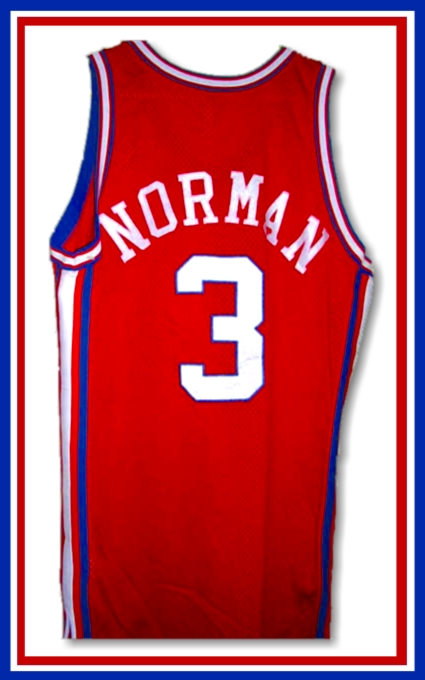
Norman's Clippers jersey.

The 6'8" 215 pound-Norman played six seasons with the Clippers. His best year as a professional was the 1988–89 NBA season as a Clipper, when he averaged 18.1 points, 8.3 rebounds, and 3.5 assists in 80 games. He was also a member of the team when they made their first play-off appearance in Los Angeles in 1992.

=== Milwaukee Bucks ===
In 1993, he signed as a free agent with the Milwaukee Bucks, where he averaged 11.9 points per game in all 82 games.

=== Atlanta Hawks ===
After playing one season with the Bucks, he was traded to the Atlanta Hawks. He averaged 12.7 points per game in 74 games and hit 98 three-point field goals during the 1994–95 NBA season. He spent the rest of his career in Atlanta before retiring in 1997. In his NBA career, Norman played in a total of 646 games and scored 8,717 points.

== Honors ==
=== Basketball ===
- 1986 - 1st Team All-Big Ten
- 1987 - Team Captain
- 1987 - Team MVP
- 1987 - 1st Team All-Big Ten
- 1987 - 2nd Team All American
- 2004 - Elected to the "Illini Men's Basketball All-Century Team".
- 2008 - Honored jersey which hangs in the State Farm Center to show regard for being the most decorated basketball players in the University of Illinois' history.
- 2015 - Inducted into the Illinois Basketball Coaches Association's Hall of Fame as a player.

== College statistics ==
=== University of Illinois ===
Season	Games	Points	PPG	Field Goals	Attempts	Avg	Free Throws	Attempts	Avg	Rebounds	Avg	Assists	APG	Blocks	BPG
1984–85	29	227	7.8	86	136	.632	55	83	.663	107	3.7	26	0.9	16	0.6
1985–86	32	525	16.4	216	337	.641	93	116	.802	226	7.1	32	1.0	25	0.8
1986–87	31	641	20.7	256	443	.578	128	176	.727	303	9.8	68	2.2	48	1.5
Totals	92	1393	15.1	558	916	.609	276	375	.736	636	6.9	126	1.4	89	1.0

== NBA career statistics ==
Legend
GP	Games played	GS	Games started	MPG	Minutes per game
FG%	Field goal percentage	3P%	3-point field goal percentage	FT%	Free throw percentage
RPG	Rebounds per game	APG	Assists per game	SPG	Steals per game
BPG	Blocks per game	PPG	Points per game	**Bold**	Career high
*	Led the league

=== Regular season ===
Year	Team	GP	GS	MPG	FG%	3P%	FT%	RPG	APG	SPG	BPG	PPG
1987–88	L.A. Clippers	66	28	21.7	.482	.000	.512	4.0	1.2	0.7	0.5	8.6
1988–89	L.A. Clippers	80	**79**	**37.8**	.502	.190	.630	**8.3**	**3.5**	**1.3**	0.8	**18.1**
1989–90	L.A. Clippers	70	64	33.3	.510	**.438**	**.632**	6.7	2.3	1.1	0.8	16.1
1990–91	L.A. Clippers	70	45	33.0	.501	.188	.629	7.1	2.3	0.9	**0.9**	17.4
1991–92	L.A. Clippers	77	24	26.1	.490	.143	.535	5.8	1.6	0.7	**0.9**	12.1
1992–93	L.A. Clippers	76	71	32.6	**.511**	.263	.595	7.5	2.2	0.8	0.8	15.0
1993–94	Milwaukee	**82***	75	31.0	.448	.333	.503	6.1	2.7	0.7	0.6	11.9
1994–95	Atlanta	74	27	25.4	.453	.344	.457	4.9	1.3	0.5	0.3	12.7
1995–96	Atlanta	34	28	22.6	.465	.393	.354	3.9	1.9	0.4	0.5	8.9
1996–97	Atlanta	17	0	12.9	.287	.158	.333	2.3	0.7	0.4	0.2	3.8
Career		646	441	29.4	.486	.312	.567	6.1	2.1	0.8	0.7	13.5

=== Playoffs ===
Year	Team	GP	GS	MPG	FG%	3P%	FT%	RPG	APG	SPG	BPG	PPG
1991–92	L.A. Clippers	**5**	**5**	**36.8**	**.509**	.000	**.529**	**9.8**	**3.0**	**0.8**	**0.6**	12.6
1992–93	L.A. Clippers	**5**	**5**	32.8	.373	**.375**	.500	8.2	2.4	**0.8**	0.0	**12.8**
1994–95	Atlanta	3	0	14.0	.389	.125	.143	3.0	1.0	0.0	0.3	5.3
Career		13	10	30.0	.428	.222	.457	7.6	2.3	0.6	0.3	11.0
