= Joe Yezbak =

American basketball player

Joseph P. Yezbak Sr. (born March 9, 1965) is a former USIU basketball (Coach Gary Zarecky) player who was 3rd in the nation – NCAA Division I – in scoring as a junior in 1985–86. A native of Southern California, Yezbak played at United States International University for two years and established himself as one of the schools all-time greatest players. Yezbak played in 58 career games and scored a career total of 1,380 points. He held the school scoring record for close to five years, but in 1992 Kevin Bradshaw surpassed him. In his NCAA junior season, he averaged 27.0 points per game, was named as a member of Basketball Times Junior College All American Transfer team and was team MVP as well as captain. Yezbak played in 61 games and is the 14th all-time leading scorer (908) ('84 – '85). He was also named an All California State and 1st team All South Coast Conference player at Cerritos Junior College ('85) (Coach Jack Bogdanovich). As a player at Cerritos High School, he was an All Southeast L.A. Times selection ('82), an All South Coast L.A. Times selection ('83), a two time All San Gabriel Valley League player ('82 & '83), was named the San Gabriel Valley league's M.V.P ('83) and an All C.I.F 3A 1st Team selection ('83). He broke Ben_Howland career scoring record (1042) his senior season (1315) – ('81 -'83) and is still the school's all-time career and single-season scoring leader (548) '(83) (Coach Ian Desbourgh). Joe Yezbak has coached at both the High School and College levels and is still active in this area.
