= Bob Delle Bovi =

American basketball coach

Robert Delle Bovi
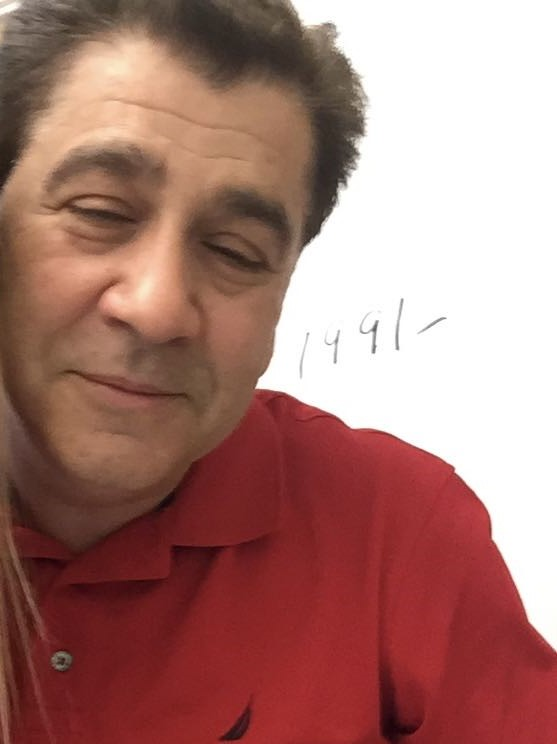

Bob Delle Bovi is an American former head coach of the Manhattan Jaspers basketball team, which had a 13-43 record during his tenure in 1996-98. One of the losses was the result of him pulling the team off the court to protest the officiating.

He currently works as an English teacher at Pleasantville High School in Pleasantville, New York. He is also the current head coach of the Hastings Yellow Jackets in Hastings on Hudson, NY.
