= 1985–86 Nebraska Cornhuskers men's basketball team =

American college basketball season

1985–86 Nebraska Cornhuskers men's basketball

NCAA tournament
- Conference: Big Eight Conference
- Record: 19–11 (8–6 Big Eight)
- Head coach: Moe Iba (6th season)
- Assistant coaches: Tom Baack; Randy Cipriano; Doug Farley
- Home arena: Bob Devaney Sports Center

1985–86 Big Eight Conference men's basketball standings
	Conf.				Overall
Team	W		L	PCT	W		L	PCT
No. 2 Kansas †	13	–	1	.929	35	–	4	.897
Iowa State	9	–	5	.643	22	–	11	.667
Nebraska	8	–	6	.571	19	–	11	.633
Missouri	8	–	6	.571	21	–	14	.600
No. 15 Oklahoma	8	–	6	.571	26	–	9	.743
Oklahoma State	6	–	8	.429	15	–	13	.536
Kansas State	4	–	10	.286	16	–	14	.533
Colorado	0	–	14	.000	8	–	20	.286
† 1986 Big Eight tournament winner As of March 31, 1986; Rankings from AP Poll

The 1985–86 Nebraska Cornhuskers men's basketball team represented the University of Nebraska–Lincoln during the 1985–86 college basketball season. Led by head coach Moe Iba (6th season), the Cornhuskers competed in the Big Eight Conference and played their home games at the Bob Devaney Sports Center. They finished with a record of 19–11 overall and 8–6 in Big Eight Conference play. Nebraska fell to Iowa State in the semifinal round of the Big Eight tournament, but earned an at-large bid to the 1986 NCAA tournament – the first NCAA Tournament appearance in school history – as the No. 9 seed in the Southeast region. The Cornhuskers were beaten by No. 8 seed Western Kentucky in the opening round, 67–59. Coach Iba resigned following the loss.

Senior center Dave Hoppen was selected to the All-Big Eight team for the third time. Hoppen, who suffered an ACL tear on February 1st to end his season, had his number 42 retired before the home finale against Colorado, and he remains the school's career leading scorer with 2,167 points.

== Roster ==
1985–86 Nebraska Cornhuskers men's basketball team
Players
Coaches

Pos.	#	Name	Height	Weight	Year	Previous school	Hometown
G	10	Darren Brown	6 ft 1 in (1.85 m)	165 lb (75 kg)	Fr	Southeastern	Detroit, MI
G	12	Milton Shobe	6 ft 2 in (1.88 m)	175 lb (79 kg)	Fr	Burke	Omaha, NE
G	13	Harvey Mashall	6 ft 3 in (1.91 m)	190 lb (86 kg)	Sr	Southside	Jackson, TN
G	14	Anthony Bailous	6 ft 3 in (1.91 m)	185 lb (84 kg)	Jr	Canoga Park	Los Angeles, CA
G	20	Brian Carr	6 ft 0 in (1.83 m)	165 lb (75 kg)	Jr	Burris	Muncie, IN
G	22	Joel Sealer	6 ft 2 in (1.88 m)	175 lb (79 kg)	So	Millard South	Omaha, NE
G	30	Bernard Day	6 ft 5 in (1.96 m)	200 lb (91 kg)	Jr	Woodson	Washington, D.C.
F	32	Chris Logan	6 ft 5 in (1.96 m)	195 lb (88 kg)	Sr	South Natchez	Natchez, MS
F	34	Keith Neubert	6 ft 7 in (2.01 m)	210 lb (95 kg)	So	Fort Atkinson	Fort Atkinson, WI
F	35	Bill Jackman	6 ft 9 in (2.06 m)	210 lb (95 kg)	Jr	Perkins County	Grant, NE
F	40	Mike Martz	6 ft 6 in (1.98 m)	200 lb (91 kg)	Jr	Beatrice	Beatrice, NE
C	42	Dave Hoppen	6 ft 11 in (2.11 m)	235 lb (107 kg)	Sr	Benson	Omaha, NE
F	44	Deak Vance	6 ft 7 in (2.01 m)	215 lb (98 kg)	Jr	Lincoln High	Lincoln, NE
F	50	John Matzke	6 ft 7 in (2.01 m)	190 lb (86 kg)	Sr	Lincoln	Lincoln, NE

Head coach

Moe Iba

Assistant coach(es)

- Tom Baack
- Randy Cipriano
- Doug Farley

Legend

- (C) Team captain
- (S) Suspended
- (I) Ineligible
- (W) Walk-on
- Injured
- Current redshirt

Roster
Last update: May 26, 2024

== Schedule and results ==
Date time, TV	Rank^{#}	Opponent^{#}	Result	Record	Site city, state
Regular season
Nov 23, 1985*		Wisconsin-Stout	W 71–53	1–0	Bob Devaney Sports Center; Lincoln, Nebraska
Nov 26, 1985*		Southern Illinois	W 85–50	2–0	Bob Devaney Sports Center; Lincoln, Nebraska
Nov 30, 1985*		at Wyoming	W 64–53	3–0	Arena-Auditorium; Laramie, Wyoming
Dec 2, 1985*		UC Irvine	L 80–87	3–1	Bob Devaney Sports Center; Lincoln, Nebraska
Dec 7, 1985*		Creighton; Rivalry	W 71–52	4–1	Bob Devaney Sports Center; Lincoln, Nebraska
Dec 12, 1985*		at Washington State	W 79–72	5–1	Friel Court; Pullman, Washington
Dec 14, 1985*		at Montana State	W 76–59	6–1	Worthington Arena; Havre, Montana
Dec 20, 1985*		Georgia	L 63–67	6–2	Bob Devaney Sports Center; Lincoln, Nebraska
Dec 23, 1985*		Arizona State	W 80–67	7–2	Bob Devaney Sports Center; Lincoln, Nebraska
Dec 29, 1985*		vs. Alabama; Sun Carnival Classic Tournament	L 61–78	7–3	Special Events Center; El Paso, Texas
Dec 30, 1985*		vs. Ohio State; Sun Carnival Classic Tournament	W 69–66	8–3	Special Events Center; El Paso, Texas
Jan 6, 1986*		Evansville	W 77–70	9–3	Bob Devaney Sports Center; Lincoln, Nebraska
Jan 11, 1986*		Northeast Missouri State	W 99–56	10–3	Bob Devaney Sports Center; Lincoln, Nebraska
Jan 15, 1986		No. 8 Kansas	L 70–81	10–4 (0–1)	Bob Devaney Sports Center; Lincoln, Nebraska
Jan 18, 1986		Missouri	L 67–68	10–5 (0–2)	Bob Devaney Sports Center; Lincoln, Nebraska
Jan 22, 1986		Oklahoma State	W 68–52	11–5 (1–2)	Bob Devaney Sports Center; Lincoln, Nebraska
Jan 25, 1986		Iowa State	W 75–58	12–5 (2–2)	Bob Devaney Sports Center; Lincoln, Nebraska
Jan 29, 1986		at No. 6 Oklahoma	L 60–87	12–6 (2–3)	Lloyd Noble Center; Norman, Oklahoma
Feb 1, 1986		at Colorado	W 77–60	13–6 (3–3)	CU Events/Conference Center; Boulder, Colorado
Feb 5, 1986		Kansas State	L 54–64	13–7 (3–4)	Bob Devaney Sports Center; Lincoln, Nebraska
Feb 8, 1986		at Missouri	W 75–66	14–7 (4–4)	Hearnes Center; Columbia, Missouri
Feb 12, 1986		at Oklahoma State	W 62–51	15–7 (5–4)	Gallagher-Iba Arena; Stillwater, Oklahoma
Feb 15, 1986		at No. 3 Kansas	L 61–79	15–8 (5–5)	Allen Fieldhouse; Lawrence, Kansas
Feb 19, 1986		No. 10 Oklahoma	W 66–64	16–8 (6–5)	Bob Devaney Sports Center; Lincoln, Nebraska
Feb 22, 1986		at Iowa State	L 73–81	16–9 (6–6)	Hilton Coliseum; Ames, Iowa
Feb 26, 1986		Colorado	W 79–72	17–9 (7–6)	Bob Devaney Sports Center; Lincoln, Nebraska
Mar 1, 1986		at Kansas State	W 64–60	18–9 (8–6)	Ahearn Field House; Manhattan, Kansas
Big Eight tournament
Mar 6, 1986*		vs. Oklahoma State; Quarterfinals	W 82–75	19–9	Kemper Arena; Kansas City, Missouri
Mar 7, 1986*		vs. Iowa State; Semifinals	L 58–75	19–10	Kemper Arena; Kansas City, Missouri
NCAA Tournament
Mar 14, 1986*	(9 SE)	vs. (8 SE) Western Kentucky; First Round	L 59–67	19–11	Charlotte Coliseum; Charlotte, North Carolina
*Non-conference game. ^{#}Rankings from AP poll. (#) Tournament seedings in parentheses. SE=Southeast. All times are in Central Time.

== Team players drafted into the NBA ==
Round	Pick	Player	NBA club
3	65	Dave Hoppen	Atlanta Hawks
