= Dave Hoppen =

American basketball player (born 1964)

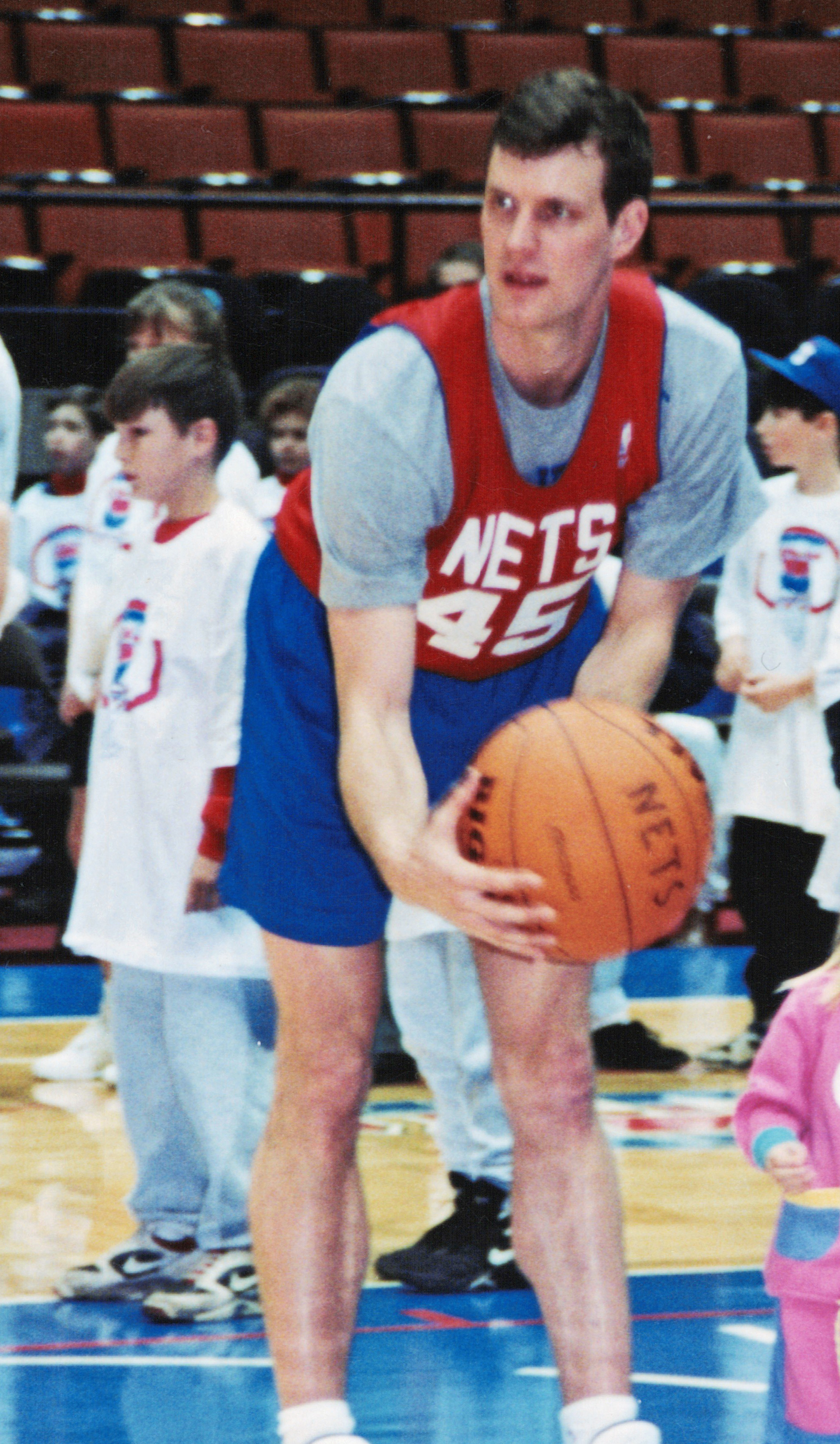
- Hoppen with the New Jersey Nets in 1993

Personal information
- Born: March 13, 1964 (age 62) Omaha, Nebraska, U.S.
- Listed height: 6 ft 11 in (2.11 m)
- Listed weight: 235 lb (107 kg)

Career information
- High school: Omaha Benson (Omaha, Nebraska)
- College: Nebraska (1982–1986)
- NBA draft: 1986: 3rd round, 65th overall pick
- Drafted by: Atlanta Hawks
- Playing career: 1987–1993
- Position: Center
- Number: 53, 52, 42, 40

Career history
- 1987: Biklim Rimini
- 1988: Topeka Sizzlers
- 1988: Milwaukee Bucks
- 1988: Golden State Warriors
- 1988–1991: Charlotte Hornets
- 1991–1992: Philadelphia 76ers
- 1992–1993: Fargo-Moorhead Fever
- 1993: New Jersey Nets
- 1993: Rapid City Thrillers

Career highlights
- 3× First-team All-Big Eight (1984–1986); No. 42 retired by Nebraska Cornhuskers
- Stats at NBA.com
- Stats at Basketball Reference
Medals
Men's basketball
Representing United States
Summer Universiade
Silver medal – second place	1985 Kobe	National team

David Dirk Hoppen (born March 13, 1964) is an American former professional basketball player who played in the National Basketball Association (NBA) and other leagues. Hoppen played college basketball for the Nebraska Cornhuskers, and is the program's all-time leading scorer. He was named All-Big Eight in each of his last three seasons and is generally considered one of the top players in school history. A 6'11" center, Hoppen was selected by the Atlanta Hawks in the third round (65th pick overall) of the 1986 NBA draft and played for five teams in his six NBA seasons.

== High school career ==
Born and raised in Omaha, Nebraska, Hoppen attended Omaha Benson High School where he was a multi-sport athlete for the "Bunnies".

As a junior, Hoppen led the Bunnies to a 21–4 record, averaging 15.8 points and 13.2 rebounds per game and was named first-team all-state. In the postseason, he led Benson to an exciting Nebraska Class A state finals. In the semifinal, the Bunnies outlasted Lincoln High School 64–62 in double-overtime. This landed the team in the state final, where they lost a hotly contested game to Creighton Prep, 54–53. Hoppen was named to both the class A and all-class tournament teams. In his senior season, Hoppen was again named first-team all-state after averaging 24.3 points and 12.5 rebounds per game.

The Nebraska high school class of 1982 is generally considered one of the best in state history, as the entire all-state starting five accepted NCAA Division I scholarship offers – Hoppen and Mike Martz to the University of Nebraska, Kerry Trotter to Marquette, Ron Kellogg to Kansas and Bill Jackman became one of Duke coach Mike Krzyzewski's first recruits (though he later transferred to join Hoppen and Martz with the Cornhuskers). The team was so strong that future NBA player Bart Kofoed was relegated to the second team. On the national AAU circuit, these players formed the nucleus of the "Nebraska Basketball Development Association" team that was strong enough to finish fourth at a Las Vegas tournament. Hoppen's personal legacy as one of the top high school players in state history is shown in his presence on the Omaha World-Herald's 2005 list of the top 100 Nebraska athletes and his 1998 induction into the Nebraska High School Sports Hall of Fame.

Hoppen was highly recruited, with his finalist list consisting of Nebraska, Notre Dame, Kentucky, Missouri, Kansas and Colorado. He ultimately narrowed this down to a decision between Nebraska and Notre Dame. Notre Dame coach Digger Phelps focused his recruiting pitch on his ability to help Hoppen become a first round NBA draft choice, but the Omaha center ultimately chose Nebraska as a school where he could help establish a tradition.

== College career ==
=== Early success ===
Hoppen arrived at the University of Nebraska–Lincoln in the Fall of 1982. The 6'11" center was a particularly highly anticipated recruit as the Cornhuskers had gone 16–12 the previous season with no starter taller than 6'6. He immediately entered the starting lineup for coach Moe Iba's 1982–83 team, averaging 13.9 points and 5 rebounds per game. The Huskers experienced team success with their new inside presence, finishing tied for third in the Big Eight Conference and earning a bid to the 1983 National Invitation Tournament (NIT). Once there, the Huskers defeated Tulane, Iona and TCU to earn a spot in the tournament final four at Madison Square Garden in New York City. However, the team lost their semifinal matchup to Ray Meyer's DePaul team, despite Hoppen scoring 15 points.

As a sophomore, Hoppen became one of the top players in the Big Eight Conference. He was one of only two players in the league (with Oklahoma's Wayman Tisdale) to score double-figures in each of his team's games, and was named first-team all-conference. He averaged 19.9 points and 6.9 rebounds per game, again leading the Cornhuskers to the 1984 NIT. There, Hoppen propelled the Cornhuskers past in-state rival Creighton in the first round by scoring a game-high 25 points, including a basket and a technical free throw in the final seconds to seal the 56–54 victory. In the next round, Nebraska lost a close 58–57 contest to Xavier in Cincinnati, despite Hoppen's game-high 22 points.

=== Acclaim as an upperclassmen ===
After finishing third in the Big Eight the previous year, the Cornhuskers were predicted to finish fourth in the 1984–85 season, Hoppen's junior campaign. while the team started the season with five consecutive wins, with Hoppen matching up against future NBA big men Benjamin, Eric Leckner of Wyoming, and Scott Roth of Wisconsin, the team struggled in Big Eight play, finishing 5–7 in conference games for a seventh place finish. Nebraska was selected for the 1985 NIT, winning their first round match-up with Canisius before losing to eventual champion UCLA and Reggie Miller, for a final season record of 16–14. Hoppen enjoyed the best statistical season of his career, leading the team in scoring and rebounding and was again selected first-team All-Big Eight. He set six school records on the season, including points per game in a season (23.5), a mark that still stands 40 years later, and total points in a season (704), since eclipsed.

Foregoing the 1985 NBA draft, Hoppen returned to Nebraska for his senior season. He became the first Cornhusker and fourth Big Eight player to surpass the 2,000 career point threshold in a January 6, 1985 game against Evansville. Hoppen had another strong season, averaging 22.1 points and 7.7 rebounds and positioning the Cornhuskers to secure their first NCAA Tournament bid in school history. However, on February 1, 1986, Hoppen sustained an Anterior cruciate ligament injury to his left knee in a game at Colorado, ending his college career. The Cornhuskers finished the season 19–11, losing in the first round of the 1986 NCAA tournament to Western Kentucky with Hoppen on crutches on the sideline.

=== Legacy and playing style ===
Hoppen finished his Nebraska career as the program's all-time leading scorer for a career (2,167 points) and season, along with eight other school records for field goals, free throws and minutes played. He was the first Nebraska basketball player to have his number (42) retired, in a ceremony coming before the team's final home game his senior season. He was inducted into the school’s Athletic Hall of Fame in 2017.

Hoppen enjoyed a college rivalry with Creighton center and future NBA player Benoit Benjamin. While McDonald's All-American Benjamin was a much bigger name in national recruiting scene, Hoppen had some of his best games in match-ups against the Omaha school. Though a big man, Hoppen was known as a finesse player with a deft shooting touch. He employed a jump hook and a variety of other offensive weapons in the paint.

== Professional career ==
=== Rehabilitation and road to the NBA (1986–1988) ===
Following the conclusion of his college career, Hoppen turned his focus to the 1986 NBA draft. Hoppen had been considered a first round pick before his injury, but had been uncertain what impact his injury would have on his draft position. He was drafted by the Atlanta Hawks in the third round of the draft (65th pick overall), largely on the recommendation of Hawks assistant coach Willis Reed, who had seen Hoppen play well against his teams at Creighton. Hoppen sat out the 1986–87 basketball season to rehabilitate his injury.

With the Hawks blessing, Hoppen signed with Basket Rimini Crabs in Italy for the 1987–88 season. However, he played only three games before a contract dispute caused him to split with the team. Upon return to the United States, he saw an opportunity to sign with the Topeka Sizzlers of the Continental Basketball Association (CBA), but the move required a release from his contract with the Hawks. Hoppen ultimately secured his release on January 1, 1988 and immediately upon clearing waivers signed with Topeka to begin his professional career in the U.S.

Hoppen's time with the Sizzlers would prove to be brief. He played six games with the team, averaging 15.3 points and 10.8 rebounds, before the Milwaukee Bucks signed him to a 10-day contract to replace the injured Larry Krystkowiak. He made his NBA debut on January 14, 1988, nearly two years after his ACL injury ended his college career. Hoppen was a perfect 2–2 from the floor in ten minutes of action, scoring 5 points in a loss to the Washington Bullets. During the course of his 10-day contract, Hoppen played three games and averaged 3.7 points and 2.3 rebounds in 11.7 minutes per game for the Bucks.

=== First full contract with Golden State and move to the expansion Charlotte Hornets (1988–1991) ===
Upon completion of his 10-day contract, Hoppen had more NBA options and ultimately chose a guaranteed contract with the Golden State Warriors over a league minimum deal with the Bucks. Hoppen joined a Warriors team with a relative log jam in the post, but also numerous injuries, opening up playing time sporadically. In 36 games and 8 starts, Hoppen averaged 5.9 points and 4.6 rebounds per game. He scored what would ultimately prove to be his NBA career high 17 points in an April 17, 1988 game against the Los Angeles Clippers.

== Career statistics ==
Legend
GP	Games played	GS	Games started	MPG	Minutes per game
FG%	Field goal percentage	3P%	3-point field goal percentage	FT%	Free throw percentage
RPG	Rebounds per game	APG	Assists per game	SPG	Steals per game
BPG	Blocks per game	PPG	Points per game	**Bold**	Career high

=== NBA ===
==== Regular season ====
Year	Team	GP	GS	MPG	FG%	3P%	FT%	RPG	APG	SPG	BPG	PPG
1987–88	Milwaukee	3	0	11.7	.364	.000	**1.000**	2.3	0.7	0.0	0.0	3.7
1987–88	Golden State	36	8	16.9	.465	.000	.864	4.6	**0.8**	**0.4**	0.2	5.9
1988–89	Charlotte	**77**	**36**	**18.4**	.564	**.500**	.727	**5.0**	0.7	0.3	**0.3**	**6.5**
1989–90	Charlotte	10	2	13.5	.390	.000	.800	3.6	0.6	0.2	0.1	4.0
1990–91	Charlotte	19	0	5.9	.563	.000	.800	1.6	0.2	0.1	0.1	2.3
1990–91	Philadelphia	11	0	3.9	.500	.000	.667	0.8	0.0	0.1	0.0	1.8
1991–92	Philadelphia	11	0	3.6	.286	.000	.500	0.9	0.2	0.0	0.0	0.8
1992–93	New Jersey	2	0	5.0	**1.000**	.000	.000	2.0	0.0	0.0	0.0	1.0
Career		169	46	14.2	.518	.200	.751	3.8	0.6	0.3	0.2	5.0

==== Playoffs ====
Year	Team	GP	GS	MPG	FG%	3P%	FT%	RPG	APG	SPG	BPG	PPG
1991	Philadelphia	3	0	3.0	1.000	.000	.000	1.0	0.0	0.0	0.0	2.0

=== College ===
Season Averages
Season	Team	G	MIN	PTS	REB	AST	STL	BLK	FG%	FT%
1982–83	Nebraska	**32**	25.9	13.9	5.0	1.3	0.5	**0.6**	.524	.748
1983–84	Nebraska	30	35.3	19.9	6.9	1.3	0.3	**0.6**	.599	.760
1984–85	Nebraska	30	**38.5**	**23.5**	**8.6**	1.3	**0.8**	0.4	**.646**	.781
1985–86	Nebraska	19	35.2	22.1	7.7	**1.6**	0.7	**0.6**	.616	**.803**
Totals:		111	33.4	19.5	7.0	1.3	0.6	0.5	.600	.772
