= 1985–86 Kansas Jayhawks men's basketball team =

American college basketball season

1985–86 Kansas Jayhawks men's basketball

Big Eight tournament champions Big Eight Regular Season Champions

NCAA tournament, Final Four
- Conference: Big Eight Conference

Ranking
- Coaches: No. 2
- AP: No. 2
- Record: 35–4 (13–1 Big 8)
- Head coach: Larry Brown (3rd season)
- Assistant coaches: R. C. Buford (3rd season); Tom Butler (1st season); Ed Manning (3rd season); Bill Self (1st season)
- Captains: Greg Dreiling; Mark Turgeon
- Home arena: Allen Fieldhouse

1985–86 Big Eight Conference men's basketball standings
	Conf.				Overall
Team	W		L	PCT	W		L	PCT
No. 2 Kansas †	13	–	1	.929	35	–	4	.897
Iowa State	9	–	5	.643	22	–	11	.667
Nebraska	8	–	6	.571	19	–	11	.633
Missouri	8	–	6	.571	21	–	14	.600
No. 15 Oklahoma	8	–	6	.571	26	–	9	.743
Oklahoma State	6	–	8	.429	15	–	13	.536
Kansas State	4	–	10	.286	16	–	14	.533
Colorado	0	–	14	.000	8	–	20	.286
† 1986 Big Eight tournament winner As of March 31, 1986; Rankings from AP Poll

The 1985–86 Kansas Jayhawks men's basketball team represented the University of Kansas during the 1985–86 NCAA Division I men's basketball season. One major rule change that took effect during the season was the introduction of the shot clock.

== Roster ==
1985–86 Kansas Jayhawks men's basketball team
Players
Coaches

Pos.	#	Name	Height	Weight	Year	Previous school	Hometown
G	42	Jeff Johnson	6 ft 4 in (1.93 m)	175 lb (79 kg)	So	Lawrence	Lawrence, Kansas
G	10	Scooter Barry	6 ft 2 in (1.88 m)	165 lb (75 kg)	Fr	De La Salle	Concord, California
G	11	Mark Turgeon	5 ft 10 in (1.78 m)	150 lb (68 kg)	Jr	Hayden	Topeka, Kansas
G	15	Altonio Campbell	5 ft 11 in (1.8 m)	165 lb (75 kg)	Sr	Vashon	St. Louis, Missouri
F	20	Rodney Hull	6 ft 7 in (2.01 m)	205 lb (93 kg)	Sr	Simeon	Chicago, Illinois
G/F	21	Milt Newton	6 ft 4 in (1.93 m)	175 lb (79 kg)	Fr	Coolidge	Washington, D.C.
G	22	Cedric Hunter	6 ft 0 in (1.83 m)	180 lb (82 kg)	Jr	Omaha South	Omaha, Nebraska
F	23	Archie Marshall	6 ft 6 in (1.98 m)	185 lb (84 kg)	RS Jr	Edison	Tulsa, Oklahoma
F	24	Chris Piper	6 ft 8 in (2.03 m)	195 lb (88 kg)	RS So	Lawrence	Lawrence, Kansas
F/C	25	Danny Manning	6 ft 10 in (2.08 m)	255 lb (116 kg)	So	Lawrence	Lawrence, Kansas
C	30	Greg Dreiling	7 ft 1 in (2.16 m)	250 lb (113 kg)	Sr	Kapaun Mt. Carmel	Wichita, Kansas
F	35	Calvin Thompson	6 ft 6 in (1.98 m)	205 lb (93 kg)	Sr	Wyandotte	Kansas City, Kansas
C	40	Mark Pellock	6 ft 9 in (2.06 m)	215 lb (98 kg)	Fr	Parsons	Parsons, Kansas
F	43	Jerry L. Johnson	6 ft 7 in (2.01 m)	190 lb (86 kg)	Sr	Omaha Benson	Omaha, Nebraska
SG	44	Ron Kellogg	6 ft 5 in (1.96 m)	190 lb (86 kg)	Sr	Omaha Northwest	Omaha, Nebraska

Head coach

- Larry Brown

Assistant coach(es)

Legend

- (C) Team captain
- (S) Suspended
- (I) Ineligible
- (W) Walk-on
- Injured
- Current redshirt

Roster

== Schedule ==
Date time, TV	Rank^{#}	Opponent^{#}	Result	Record	Site city, state
Regular season
November 22*	No. 5	vs. Pepperdine; Preseason NIT First Round	W 67–61	1–0	McNichols Arena; Denver, CO
November 24*	No. 5	vs. Washington; Preseason NIT Second Round	W 69–64	2–0	McNichols Arena; Denver, CO
November 29*; ESPN	No. 5	vs. No. 9 Louisville; Preseason NIT Semifinals	W 83–78	3–0	Madison Square Garden; New York, NY
December 1* ESPN	No. 5	vs. No. 6 Duke; Preseason NIT Championship Game	L 86–92	3–1	Madison Square Garden; New York, NY
December 3*	No. 7	SIU-Edwardsville	W 86–71	4–1	Allen Fieldhouse; Lawrence, KS
December 4*	No. 7	Western Carolina	W 101–79	5–1	Allen Fieldhouse; Lawrence, KS
December 7*	No. 7	at NC State	W 71–56	6–1	Greensboro Coliseum; Greensboro, NC
December 9*	No. 7	South Alabama	W 72–48	7–1	Allen Fieldhouse; Lawrence, KS
December 14*	No. 7	No. 9 Kentucky	W 83–66	8–1	Allen Fieldhouse; Lawrence, KS
December 21*	No. 6	Arkansas	W 89–78	9–1	Allen Fieldhouse; Lawrence, KS
December 23*	No. 6	George Washington	W 94–71	10–1	Allen Fieldhouse; Lawrence, KS
December 27*	No. 6	vs. Louisiana Tech	W 81–59	11–1	Kemper Arena; Kansas City, MO
December 28*	No. 6	vs. Wichita State	W 81–56	12–1	Kemper Arena; Kansas City, MO
January 4*	No. 5	at No. 9 Memphis State	L 80–83 ^{OT}	12–2	Mid-South Coliseum; Memphis, TN
January 6*	No. 5	at Detroit	W 60–51	13–2	Cobo Arena; Detroit, MI
January 11*	No. 9	SMU	W 72–56	14–2	Allen Fieldhouse; Lawrence, KS
January 15	No. 8	at Nebraska	W 81–70	15–2 (1–0)	Bob Devaney Sports Center; Lincoln, NE
January 18	No. 8	Oklahoma State	W 95–72	16–2 (2–0)	Allen Fieldhouse; Lawrence, KS
January 21	No. 7	No. 5 Oklahoma	W 98–92	17–2 (3–0)	Allen Fieldhouse; Lawrence, KS
January 23	No. 7	at Missouri; Border War	W 81–77	18–2 (4–0)	Hearnes Center; Columbia, MO
January 25*	No. 7	No. 13 Louisville	W 71–69	19–2	Allen Fieldhouse; Lawrence, KS
January 27	No. 7	at Iowa State	L 74–77	19–3 (4–1)	Hilton Coliseum; Ames, IA
February 1	No. 4	at Kansas State; Sunflower Showdown	W 64–50	20–3 (5–1)	Ahearn Fieldhouse; Manhattan, KS
February 5	No. 6	Colorado	W 100–64	21–3 (6–1)	Allen Fieldhouse; Lawrence, KS
February 8	No. 6	at Oklahoma State	W 85–69	22–3 (7–1)	Gallagher-Iba Arena (6,381); Stillwater, OK
February 11	No. 3	Missouri	W 100–66	23–3 (8–1)	Allen Fieldhouse; Lawrence, KS
February 15	No. 3	Nebraska	W 79–61	24–3 (9–1)	Allen Fieldhouse; Lawrence, KS
February 19	No. 3	at Colorado	W 79–74	25–3 (10–1)	Coors Events Center; Boulder, CO
February 22	No. 3	Kansas State	W 84–69	26–3 (11–1)	Allen Fieldhouse; Lawrence, KS
February 24	No. 3	at No. 10 Oklahoma	W 87–80	27–3 (12–1)	Lloyd Noble Center; Norman, OK
March 1	No. 2	Iowa State	W 90–70	28–3 (13–1)	Allen Fieldhouse; Lawrence, KS
Big 8 Tournament
March 7*	No. 2	vs. Kansas State; Big Eight tournament quarterfinal	W 74–51	29–3	Kemper Arena; Kansas City, MO
March 8*	No. 2	vs. No. 15 Oklahoma; Big Eight tournament semifinal	W 72–70	30–3	Kemper Arena; Kansas City, MO
March 9*	No. 2	vs. Iowa State; Big Eight tournament Final	W 73–71	31–3	Kemper Arena; Kansas City, MO
NCAA Tournament
March 13*; NCAA productions	(1) No. 2	vs. (16) North Carolina A&T; NCAA Midwest Regional first round	W 71–46	32–3	University of Dayton Arena; Dayton, OH
March 15*; CBS	(1) No. 2	vs. (8) Temple; NCAA Midwest Regional second round	W 65–43	33–3	University of Dayton Arena; Dayton, OH
March 21*; CBS	(1) No. 2	vs. (5) No. 18 Michigan State; NCAA Midwest Regional semifinal	W 96–86 ^{OT}	34–3	Kemper Arena; Kansas City, MO
March 23*; CBS	(1) No. 2	vs. (3) NC State; NCAA Midwest Regional final	W 75–67	35–3	Kemper Arena; Kansas City, MO
March 29*; CBS	(1) No. 2	vs. (1) No. 1 Duke; NCAA Final Four	L 67–71	35–4	Reunion Arena; Dallas, TX
*Non-conference game. ^{#}Rankings from AP poll. (#) Tournament seedings in parentheses. MW=Midwest. All times are in Central Time.
