= Grant City Park (Grant, Nebraska) =

- U.S. National Register of Historic Places
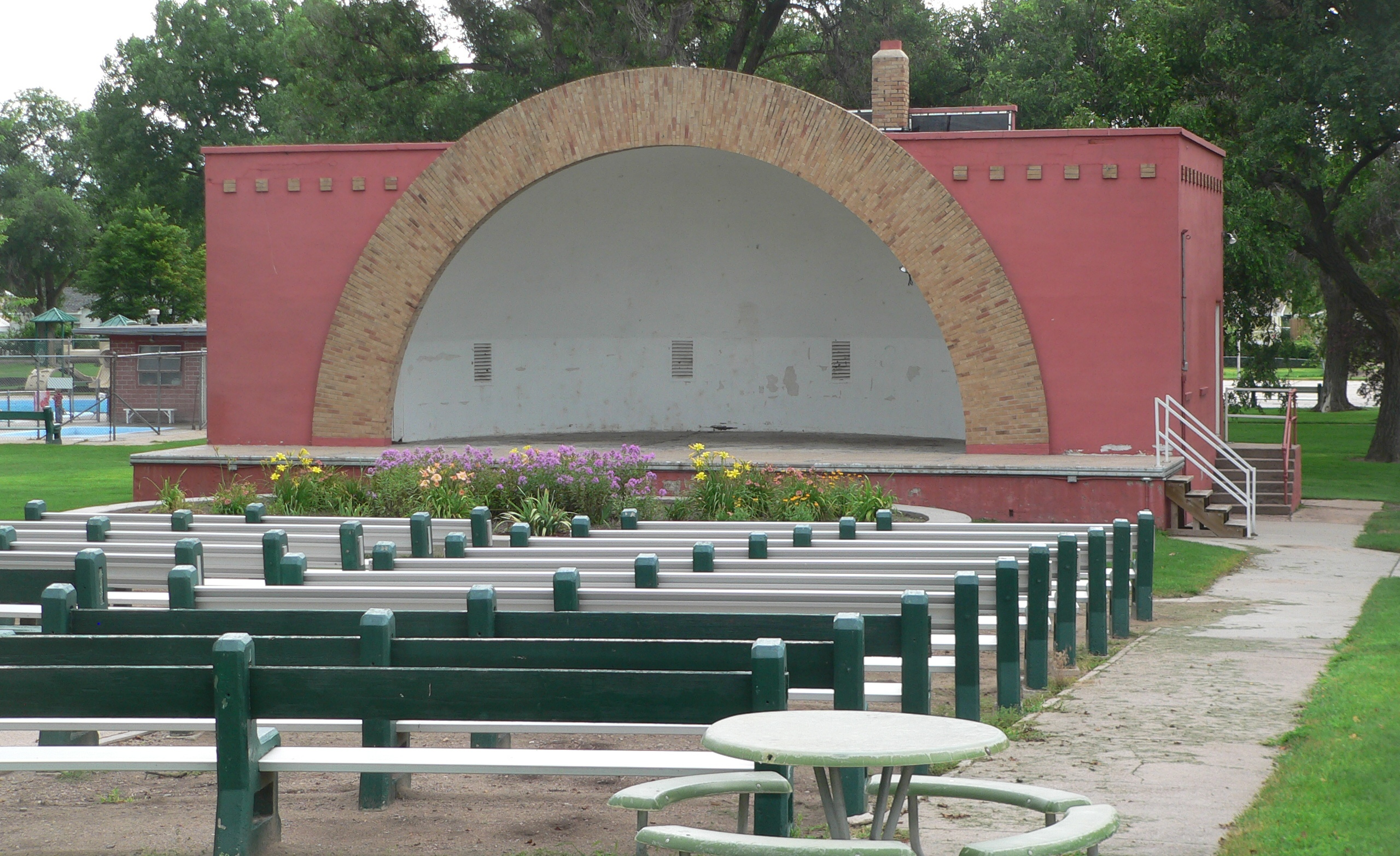
- The Grant City Park band shell

- Location within Nebraska Location within the United States
- Location: Bounded by Central Ave., 9th St., alley line and 8th St., Grant, Nebraska
- Coordinates: 40°50′52″N 101°43′25″W
- Area: 8.5 acres (3.4 ha)
- Built: 1935
- Built by: WPA
- NRHP reference No.: 96000066
- Added to NRHP: February 16, 1996

Grant City Park is a public park in Grant, Nebraska. The Works Progress Administration constructed the park between 1936 and 1939. Before the park's creation, Grant had no public parks other than a public swimming pool and softball field; recognizing a need for additional recreation facilities, the city's Garden Club convinced the Village Board of Trustees to approve a public park in 1935.

The main feature of the park is an arched concrete band shell. The band shell hosted free concerts from its construction through the 1960s. Thirty concrete and wood benches provide seating for spectators at the band shell. A 33-by-20-foot (10.1 by 6.1 m) concrete fountain, now used as a flower bed, is located in front of the band shell's stage. The park also includes two stone entrances: an arched main entrance at its southeast corner and a walled southern entrance leading to a tiered rock garden. Recreational facilities at the park include tennis courts and a swimming pool, the latter of which was added in the 1960s.

The park was added to the National Register of Historic Places on February 16, 1996.
