= Bill Jackman =

Bill Jackman may refer to:

- Bill Jackman (baseball) (1897–1972), American baseball player
- Bill Jackman (basketball) (born 1963), American basketball player
