= 1977–78 Creighton Bluejays men's basketball team =

American college basketball season

1977–78 Creighton Bluejays men's basketball

MVC Regular season and tournament champion

NCAA tournament
- Conference: Missouri Valley Conference
- Record: 19–9 (12–4 MVC)
- Head coach: Tom Apke (4th season)
- Assistant coaches: Tom Brosnihan; Mike Caruso
- Home arena: Omaha Civic Auditorium

1977–78 Missouri Valley Conference men's basketball standings
	Conf.				Overall
Team	W		L	PCT	W		L	PCT
Creighton †	12	–	4	.750	19	–	9	.679
Southern Illinois	11	–	5	.688	17	–	10	.630
Indiana State	11	–	5	.688	23	–	9	.719
New Mexico State	9	–	7	.563	15	–	14	.517
Bradley	8	–	8	.500	14	–	14	.500
Wichita State	8	–	8	.500	13	–	14	.481
Tulsa	7	–	9	.438	9	–	18	.333
West Texas State	4	–	12	.250	8	–	19	.296
Drake	2	–	14	.125	6	–	22	.214
† 1978 MVC tournament winner Rankings from AP Poll

The 1977–78 Creighton Bluejays men's basketball team represented Creighton University during the 1977–78 NCAA Division I men's basketball season. The Bluejays, led by head coach Tom Apke, played their home games at the Omaha Civic Auditorium. The Jays finished with a 19–9 record (12–4 MVC), and won the Missouri Valley Conference tournament to earn an automatic bid to the 1978 NCAA tournament. As No. 3 qualifying seed in the Midwest region, the Jays fell to No. 1 at-large seed DePaul in the opening round.

== Roster ==
1977–78 Creighton Bluejays men's basketball team
Players
Coaches

Pos.	#	Name	Height	Weight	Year	Previous school	Hometown
G	10	Randy Eccker	6 ft 0 in (1.83 m)	182 lb (83 kg)	Sr	Bear Creek	Denver, Colorado
G	25	John C. Johnson	6 ft 3 in (1.91 m)	179 lb (81 kg)	Jr	Omaha Central	Omaha, Nebraska
G	30	Kevin McKenna	6 ft 7 in (2.01 m)	190 lb (86 kg)	Fr	Palatine	Palatine, Illinois
G	31	Paul Dinkins	6 ft 5 in (1.96 m)	185 lb (84 kg)	Sr	Benton Consolidated	Benton, Illinois
F	32	Dennis Rasmussen	6 ft 6 in (1.98 m)	215 lb (98 kg)	Fr	Bear Creek	Denver, Colorado
G	34	Paul Trieschman	6 ft 4 in (1.93 m)	170 lb (77 kg)	Fr	Grand Island Senior	Grand Island, Nebraska
G	40	Kevin Kuehl	6 ft 2 in (1.88 m)	185 lb (84 kg)	Sr	Creighton Prep	Omaha, Nebraska
C	42	Jim Honz	6 ft 9 in (2.06 m)	215 lb (98 kg)	Fr	Bishop Ryan	Omaha, Nebraska
F/C	43	David Wesely	6 ft 7 in (2.01 m)	199 lb (90 kg)	Jr	Creighton Prep	Omaha, Nebraska
F	44	Rick Apke	6 ft 8 in (2.03 m)	205 lb (93 kg)	Sr	Elder	Cincinnati, Ohio
F	51	Tim McConnell	6 ft 7 in (2.01 m)	215 lb (98 kg)	Sr	North Eugene	Eugene, Oregon
C	52	Bill Butrym	6 ft 10 in (2.08 m)	215 lb (98 kg)	So	Marquette University	Milwaukee, Wisconsin
F	53	Dan Clausen	6 ft 7 in (2.01 m)	225 lb (102 kg)	Fr	Omaha Benson Magnet	Omaha, Nebraska

Head coach

- Tom Apke (Creighton)

Assistant coach(es)

- Tom Brosnihan
- Mike Caruso

Legend

- (C) Team captain
- (S) Suspended
- (I) Ineligible
- (W) Walk-on
- Injured
- Current redshirt

Roster

== Schedule and results ==
Date time, TV	Rank^{#}	Opponent^{#}	Result	Record	Site (attendance) city, state
Regular season
Nov 25, 1977*		Carroll (MT)	W 95–66	1–0	Omaha Civic Auditorium; Omaha, Nebraska
Nov 29, 1977*		Nebraska–Omaha	W 70–58	2–0	Omaha Civic Auditorium; Omaha, Nebraska
Dec 9, 1977*		at Nebraska; Rivalry	L 58–65	3–1	Bob Devaney Sports Center; Lincoln, Nebraska
Dec 17, 1977*		at Montana	W 71–67	4–1	Adams Field House; Missoula, Montana
Dec 20, 1977*		at Southwestern Louisiana	L 87–94	4–2	Blackham Coliseum; Lafayette, Louisiana
Dec 27, 1977		at Wichita State	W 71–70	5–2 (1–0)	Levitt Arena; Wichita, Kansas
Jan 7, 1978		Tulsa	W 78–58	6–2 (2–0)	Omaha Civic Auditorium; Omaha, Nebraska
Jan 12, 1978		at New Mexico State	L 56–78	6–3 (2–1)	Pan American Center; Las Cruces, New Mexico
Jan 14, 1978*		at West Texas A&M	W 64–60 ^{OT}	7–3	First United Bank Center; Canyon, Texas
Jan 17, 1978*		Cleveland State	W 94–63	8–3	Omaha Civic Auditorium; Omaha, Nebraska
Jan 19, 1978		Drake	W 87–77	9–3 (3–1)	Omaha Civic Auditorium; Omaha, Nebraska
Jan 21, 1978		Southern Illinois	L 69–76	9–4 (3–2)	Omaha Civic Auditorium; Omaha, Nebraska
Jan 26, 1978		at Bradley	L 99–103	9–5 (3–3)	Robertson Memorial Field House; Peoria, Illinois
Jan 28, 1978		at No. 13 Indiana State	W 72–64	10–5 (4–3)	Hulman Center; Terre Haute, Indiana
Jan 30, 1978		New Mexico State	W 84–70	11–5 (5–3)	Omaha Civic Auditorium; Omaha, Nebraska
Feb 1, 1978*		No. 13 DePaul	L 82–85 ^{3OT}	11–6 (5–3)	Omaha Civic Auditorium; Omaha, Nebraska
Feb 4, 1978		Bradley	W 86–74	12–6 (6–3)	Omaha Civic Auditorium; Omaha, Nebraska
Feb 7, 1978*		at No. 3 Marquette	L 57–82	12–7	MECCA Arena (10,938); Milwaukee, Wisconsin
Feb 9, 1978		Wichita State	W 80–76	13–7 (7–3)	Omaha Civic Auditorium; Omaha, Nebraska
Feb 11, 1978		at Drake	W 71–63	14–7 (8–3)	Veterans Memorial Auditorium; Des Moines, Iowa
Feb 13, 1978*		West Texas A&M	W 72–52	15–7	Omaha Civic Auditorium; Omaha, Nebraska
Feb 16, 1978		Indiana State	W 89–57	16–7 (9–3)	Omaha Civic Auditorium; Omaha, Nebraska
Feb 18, 1978*		at Air Force	W 73–64	17–7	Clune Arena; Colorado Springs, Colorado
Feb 20, 1978		at Tulsa	L 77–85	17–8 (9–4)	Cox Business Convention Center; Tulsa, Oklahoma
Feb 25, 1978		at Southern Illinois	W 62–56	18–8 (12–4)	SIU Arena; Carbondale, Illinois
Missouri Valley Conference tournament
Mar 5, 1978*	(1)	(3) Indiana State; Championship game	W 54–52	19–8	Omaha Civic Auditorium; Omaha, Nebraska
NCAA tournament
Mar 12, 1978*	(MW 3Q)	vs. (MW 1L) No. 4 DePaul; First round	L 78–80	19–9	Levitt Arena; Wichita, Kansas
*Non-conference game. ^{#}Rankings from AP poll. (#) Tournament seedings in parentheses. MW=Midwest. All times are in Central.
