= 1985–86 Bradley Braves men's basketball team =

American college basketball season

1985–86 Bradley Braves men's basketball

MVC Regular Season Champions

NCAA tournament, Second Round
- Conference: Missouri Valley Conference

Ranking
- Coaches: No. 13
- AP: No. 14
- Record: 32–3 (16–0 MVC)
- Head coach: Dick Versace (8th season)
- Assistant coaches: Rudy Keeling; Willie Cox; Tony Massimino
- Home arena: Carver Arena

1985–86 Missouri Valley Conference men's basketball standings
	Conf.				Overall
Team	W		L	PCT	W		L	PCT
No. 14 Bradley	16	–	0	1.000	32	–	3	.914
Tulsa †	10	–	6	.625	23	–	9	.719
Drake	10	–	6	.625	19	–	11	.633
Illinois State	9	–	7	.563	15	–	14	.517
Wichita State	7	–	9	.438	14	–	14	.500
Creighton	7	–	9	.438	12	–	16	.429
Indiana State	7	–	9	.438	11	–	17	.393
West Texas State	4	–	12	.250	11	–	17	.393
Southern Illinois	4	–	12	.250	8	–	20	.286
† 1986 MVC tournament winner Rankings from AP Poll

The 1985–86 Bradley Braves men's basketball team represented Bradley University during the 1985–86 NCAA Division I men's basketball season. The Braves were members of the Missouri Valley Conference and played their home games at Carver Arena. The team rode a 22–game winning streak on their way to a new school record for wins by finishing the season at 32–3. After sweeping through MVC regular season play with a 16–0 league mark – finishing ahead of the pack by a 6-game margin – Bradley lost in the championship game of the MVC tournament. The Braves earned an at-large bid to the NCAA tournament as No. 7 seed in the West region. The Braves defeated UTEP to open the tournament, but fell to Louisville, the eventual national champions, in the second round.

== Roster ==
1985–86 Bradley Braves men's basketball team
Players
Coaches

Pos.	#	Name	Height	Weight	Year	Previous school	Hometown
C	3	Mike Williams	6 ft 8 in (2.03 m)	250 lb (113 kg)	Sr	De La Salle	Chicago, IL
G	12	Anthony Manuel	5 ft 11 in (1.8 m)	185 lb (84 kg)	Fr	Crane	Chicago, IL
G	14	Jeff Anthony	6 ft 0 in (1.83 m)	—	So	East St. Louis	East St. Louis, IL
G	15	Jim Les	5 ft 11 in (1.8 m)	185 lb (84 kg)	Sr	Notre Dame	Niles, IL
F	21	Jerry Thomas	6 ft 6 in (1.98 m)	210 lb (95 kg)	So	Collins	Chicago, IL
F	23	Paul Wilson	6 ft 6 in (1.98 m)	—	Fr	Lorain Catholic	Lorain, OH
F/C	24	Donald Powell	6 ft 8 in (2.03 m)	215 lb (98 kg)	So	Nowata	Nowata, OK
C	25	Keith Berry	6 ft 9 in (2.06 m)	—	Jr	Dunbar	Chicago, IL
F	32	Greg Jones	6 ft 5 in (1.96 m)	—	So	Robeson	Chicago, IL
G	33	Hersey Hawkins	6 ft 3 in (1.91 m)	185 lb (84 kg)	So	Westinghouse	Chicago, IL
G	40	Trevor Trimpe	6 ft 7 in (2.01 m)	—	So	Havana	Havana, IL
G	44	Len Bertolini	6 ft 3 in (1.91 m)	—	So	St. Patrick's	Chicago, IL
F	52	Bruce Mordini	6 ft 7 in (2.01 m)	—	Jr	Highland Park	Highland Park, IL

Head coach

- Dick Versace

Assistant coach(es)

- Willie Cox
- Rudy Keeling
- Tom Massimino

Legend

- (C) Team captain
- (S) Suspended
- (I) Ineligible
- (W) Walk-on
- Injured
- Current redshirt

Roster

== Schedule ==
Date time, TV	Rank^{#}	Opponent^{#}	Result	Record	Site (attendance) city, state
Regular season
Nov 22, 1985*		at Loyola Chicago	W 94–84	1–0	Alumni Gym (5,308); Chicago, IL
Nov 25, 1985*		Chicago State	W 80–53	2–0	Carver Arena (7,643); Peoria, IL
Nov 27, 1985*		Toledo	W 69–57	3–0	Carver Arena (6,984); Peoria, IL
Nov 30, 1985*		Northwestern	W 76–72	4–0	Carver Arena (7,347); Peoria, IL
Dec 2, 1985*		at Western Illinois	W 76–62	5–0	Western Hall (3,241); Macomb, IL
Dec 7, 1985*		at Marquette	W 66–64	6–0	MECCA Arena (10,461); Milwaukee, WI
Dec 13, 1985*		Loyola Chicago	W 76–75	7–0	Carver Arena (8,358); Peoria, IL
Dec 21, 1985*		at Colorado	W 79–69	8–0	CU Events Center (3,827); Boulder, CO
Dec 23, 1985*		Saint Louis	W 81–67	9–0	Carver Arena (8,791); Peoria, IL
Dec 27, 1985*		vs. Clemson; Rainbow Classic	L 76–81	9–1	Neal S. Blaisdell Center (3,153); Honolulu, HI
Dec 28, 1985*		vs. Villanova; Rainbow Classic	W 58–56 ^{OT}	10–1	Neal S. Blaisdell Center (2,080); Honolulu, HI
Dec 30, 1985*		vs. Wake Forest; Rainbow Classic	W 86–72	11–1	Neal S. Blaisdell Center (1,556); Honolulu, HI
Jan 4, 1986		Southern Illinois	W 65–62	12–1 (1–0)	Carver Arena (9,255); Peoria, IL
Jan 6, 1986		Illinois Wesleyan	W 74–64	13–1	Carver Arena (6,573); Peoria, IL
Jan 9, 1986		at Wichita State	W 57–55	14–1 (2–0)	Levitt Arena (10,386); Wichita, KS
Jan 11, 1986		at Drake	W 69–67	15–1 (3–0)	Veterans Memorial Auditorium (5,750); Des Moines, IA
Jan 13, 1986*		at Dayton	W 79–77 ^{OT}	16–1	University of Dayton Arena (11,371); Dayton, OH
Jan 16, 1986	No. 20	West Texas State	W 78–53	17–1 (4–0)	Carver Arena (8,245); Peoria, IL
Jan 18, 1986	No. 20	Tulsa	W 71–58	18–1 (5–0)	Carver Arena (9,266); Peoria, IL
Jan 23, 1986	No. 17	Illinois State; I-74 Rivalry	W 67–63 ^{OT}	19–1 (6–0)	Carver Arena (10,450); Peoria, IL
Jan 25, 1986	No. 17	at Creighton	W 74–56	20–1 (7–0)	Omaha Civic Auditorium (7,541); Omaha, NE
Jan 30, 1986	No. 13	at West Texas State	W 63–54	21–1 (8–0)	WT Fieldhouse (3,038); Canyon, TX
Feb 1, 1986	No. 13	at Tulsa	W 54–51	22–1 (9–0)	Tulsa Convention Center (8,523); Tulsa, OK
Feb 8, 1986	No. 13	Creighton	W 79–59	23–1 (10–0)	Carver Arena (10,450); Peoria, IL
Feb 10, 1986	No. 13	at Illinois State	W 74–67	24–1 (11–0)	Horton Field House (7,745); Normal, IL
Feb 13, 1986	No. 13	at Indiana State	W 54–52	25–1 (12–0)	Hulman Center (5,648); Terre Haute, IN
Feb 15, 1986	No. 13	at Southern Illinois	W 61–60	26–1 (13–0)	SIU Arena (6,550); Carbondale, IL
Feb 20, 1986	No. 12	Drake	W 88–79	27–1 (14–0)	Carver Arena (10,450); Peoria, IL
Feb 22, 1986	No. 12	Wichita State	W 74–64	28–1 (15–0)	Carver Arena (10,450); Peoria, IL
Feb 27, 1986	No. 11	Indiana State	W 71–51	29–1 (16–0)	Carver Arena (10,450); Peoria, IL
MVC Tournament
Mar 4, 1986*	No. 9	vs. West Texas State; MVC Tournament Quarterfinal	W 61–55	30–1	Tulsa Convention Center (1,556); Tulsa, OK
Mar 5, 1986*	No. 9	vs. Illinois State; MVC Tournament Semifinal	W 65–64	31–1	Tulsa Convention Center (5,469); Tulsa, OK
Mar 6, 1986*	No. 9	at Tulsa; MVC tournament championship	L 58–74	31–2	Tulsa Convention Center (6,313); Tulsa, OK
NCAA Tournament
Mar 13, 1986*	(7 W) No. 14	vs. (10 W) No. 20 UTEP; NCAA tournament first round	W 83–65	32–2	Dee Events Center (9,978); Ogden, UT
Mar 15, 1986*	(7 W) No. 14	vs. (2 W) No. 7 Louisville; NCAA tournament second round	L 68–82	32–3	Dee Events Center (10,061); Ogden, UT
*Non-conference game. ^{#}Rankings from AP Poll. (#) Tournament seedings in parentheses. W=West. All times are in Central Time.

== Rankings ==
Ranking movements Legend: ██ Increase in ranking ██ Decrease in ranking
	Week																
Poll	Pre	1	2	3	4	5	6	7	8	9	10	11	12	13	14	15	Final
AP									20	17	13	13	13	12	11	9	14
Coaches									19	17	13	13	12	12	9	9	13

== Awards and honors ==
- Jim Les – Frances Pomeroy Naismith Award, MVC Player of the Year
- Dick Versace – Henry Iba Award, MVC Coach of the Year

== Team players in the 1986 NBA draft ==
Round	Pick	Player	NBA Club
3	51	Mike Williams	Golden State Warriors
3	70	Jim Les	Atlanta Hawks
