= 1985–86 Iowa State Cyclones men's basketball team =

American college basketball season

1985–86 Iowa State Cyclones men's basketball

NCAA Tournament, Sweet Sixteen
- Conference: Big Eight Conference
- Record: 22–11 (9–5 Big Eight)
- Head coach: Johnny Orr (6th season)
- Assistant coach: Steve Antrim
- Home arena: Hilton Coliseum

1985–86 Big Eight Conference men's basketball standings
	Conf.				Overall
Team	W		L	PCT	W		L	PCT
No. 2 Kansas †	13	–	1	.929	35	–	4	.897
Iowa State	9	–	5	.643	22	–	11	.667
Nebraska	8	–	6	.571	19	–	11	.633
Missouri	8	–	6	.571	21	–	14	.600
No. 15 Oklahoma	8	–	6	.571	26	–	9	.743
Oklahoma State	6	–	8	.429	15	–	13	.536
Kansas State	4	–	10	.286	16	–	14	.533
Colorado	0	–	14	.000	8	–	20	.286
† 1986 Big Eight tournament winner As of March 31, 1986; Rankings from AP Poll

The 1985–86 Iowa State Cyclones men's basketball team represented Iowa State University during the 1985–86 NCAA Division I men's basketball season. The Cyclones were coached by Johnny Orr, who was in his 6th season. They played their home games at Hilton Coliseum in Ames, Iowa.

They finished the season 22–11, 9–5 in Big Eight play to finish in 2nd place. The Cyclones advanced to the Big Eight tournament championship game against #2 Kansas, falling 73–71. They qualified for the NCAA Tournament as a 7 seed, defeating 10-seed Miami (Ohio) and 2-seed Michigan before falling to 6-seed NC State in the Sweet Sixteen.

== Roster ==
1985–86 Iowa State Cyclones men's basketball team
Players
Coaches

Pos.	#	Name	Height	Weight	Year	Hometown
G	44	Jeff Grayer	6 ft 5 in (1.96 m)	—	So	Flint, Michigan
G	14	Jeff Hornacek (C)	6 ft 3 in (1.91 m)	—	Sr	Elmhurst, Illinois
C	33	Sam Hill	6 ft 9 in (2.06 m)	—	Jr
G	3	Gary Thompkins	6 ft 3 in (1.91 m)	—	So
F	11	Ron Virgil (C)	6 ft 4 in (1.93 m)	—	Sr	Chicago, Illinois
F		Elmer Robinson	6 ft 5 in (1.96 m)	—
C		David Moss	6 ft 9 in (2.06 m)	—	Sr
F		Tom Schafer	6 ft 7 in (2.01 m)	—
F	5	Lafester Rhodes	6 ft 8 in (2.03 m)	—	So
F		Eli Parker	6 ft 7 in (2.01 m)	—
G		Maurice Poole	6 ft 1 in (1.85 m)	—
C		Darryl Spinks	6 ft 8 in (2.03 m)	—
G		Marc Urquhart	6 ft 4 in (1.93 m)	—	Fr

Head coach

- Johnny Orr (Beloit)

Assistant coach(es)

- Steve Antrim

Legend

- (C) Team captain
- (S) Suspended
- (I) Ineligible
- (W) Walk-on
- Injured
- Current redshirt

== Schedule and results ==
Date time, TV	Rank^{#}	Opponent^{#}	Result	Record	Site city, state
Regular season
November 23, 1985*; 8:00 pm		South Dakota State	W 83–39	1–0	Hilton Coliseum; Ames, Iowa
November 26, 1985*; 7:30 pm		at Illinois State	W 55–52	2–0	Horton Fieldhouse; Normal, Illinois
November 30, 1985*; 1:00 pm, Cyclone Television Network		San Francisco State	W 90–53	3–0	Hilton Coliseum; Ames, Iowa
December 4, 1985*; 7:00 pm, Cyclone Television Network		Northern Iowa; Iowa Big Four	W 83–60	4–0	Hilton Coliseum; Ames, Iowa
December 7, 1985*; 7:38 pm, Heritage Cablevision		at Drake; Iowa Big Four	L 69–77	4–1	Veterans Memorial Auditorium; Des Moines, Iowa
December 10, 1985*; 8:08 pm, Cyclone Television Network		Iowa; CyHawk Rivalry	W 74–61	5–1	Hilton Coliseum; Ames, Iowa
December 14, 1985*; 1:00 pm, Cyclone Television Network		Michigan State	W 82–80 ^{OT}	6–1	Hilton Coliseum; Ames, Iowa
December 16, 1985*; 8:00 pm		South Dakota	W 95–58	7–1	Hilton Coliseum; Ames, Iowa
December 21, 1985*; 1:00 pm, Cyclone Television Network		at No. 17 Indiana	L 65–86	7–2	Assembly Hall; Bloomington, Indiana
December 27, 1985*; 6:00 pm		vs. Rice; Music City Invitational	W 94–60	8–2	Memorial Gymnasium (6,104); Nashville, Tennessee
December 28, 1985*; 8:00 pm		at Vanderbilt; Music City Invitational	W 80–79	9–2	Memorial Gymnasium (11,674); Nashville, Tennessee
December 30, 1985*; 8:05 pm		vs. No. 16 Illinois	L 62–64	9–3	Rosemont Horizon (9,876); Rosemont, Illinois
January 4, 1986*; 6:35 pm		at Detroit Mercy	L 67–77	9–4	Calihan Hall; Detroit, Michigan
Exhibition
January 6, 1986*; 8:00 pm		Windsor (Canada); Exhibition	W 114–61		Hilton Coliseum; Ames, Iowa
Regular season
January 11, 1986; 3:08 pm, Big Eight		Missouri	W 92–84	10–4 (1–0)	Hilton Coliseum; Ames, Iowa
January 15, 1986; 7:35 pm		at Kansas State	W 77–73	11–4 (2–0)	Ahearn Fieldhouse; Manhattan, Kansas
January 18, 1986; 3:00 pm, Big Eight		at No. 7 Oklahoma	L 82–95	11–5 (2–1)	Lloyd Noble Arena; Norman, Oklahoma
January 21, 1986; 8:00 pm, Cyclone Television Network		Colorado	W 90–62	12–5 (3–1)	Hilton Coliseum; Ames, Iowa
January 25, 1986; 3:00 pm, Big Eight		at Nebraska	L 58–75	12–6 (3–2)	Devaney Sports Center; Lincoln, Nebraska
January 28, 1986; 8:00 pm, Cyclone Television Network		No. 4 Kansas	W 77–74	13–6 (4–2)	Hilton Coliseum; Ames, Iowa
February 1, 1986; 1:10 pm, Big Eight		at Oklahoma State	L 65–67 ^{OT}	13–7 (4–3)	Gallagher-Iba Arena; Stillwater, Oklahoma
February 8, 1986; 1:08 pm, Raycom/Big Eight		No. 5 Oklahoma	W 73–70	14–7 (5–3)	Hilton Coliseum; Ames, Iowa
February 12, 1986; 9:05 pm		at Colorado	W 83–57	15–7 (6–3)	Coors Events Center; Boulder, Colorado
February 15, 1986; 3:08 pm, Big Eight		Kansas State	W 84–74	16–7 (7–3)	Hilton Coliseum; Ames, Iowa
February 18, 1986; 8:05 pm, Cyclone Television Network		at Missouri	L 62–81	16–8 (7–4)	Hearnes Center; Columbia, Missouri
February 22, 1986; 1:08 pm, Raycom/Big Eight		Nebraska	W 81–73	17–8 (8–4)	Hilton Coliseum; Ames, Iowa
February 25, 1986; 8:00 pm		Oklahoma State	W 76–61	18–8 (9–4)	Hilton Coliseum; Ames, Iowa
March 1, 1986; 3:08 pm, Big Eight		No. 2 Kansas	L 70–90	18–9 (9–5)	Allen Fieldhouse; Lawrence, Kansas
Big Eight tournament
March 7, 1986; 6:10 pm, Big Eight	(2)	vs. (7) Colorado; Big Eight tournament quarterfinals	W 78–60	19–9	Kemper Arena (11,032); Kansas City, Missouri
March 8, 1986; 3:00 pm, Big Eight	(2)	vs. (3) Nebraska; Big Eight tournament semifinals	W 75–58	20–9	Kemper Arena (16,985); Kansas City, Missouri
March 9, 1986; 12:40 pm, Big Eight	(2)	vs. (1) No. 2 Kansas; Big Eight tournament finals	L 71–73	20–10	Kemper Arena; Kansas City, Missouri
NCAA Tournament
March 14, 1986*; 2:37 pm, ESPN/NCAA Productions	(7 MW)	vs. (10 MW) Miami (Ohio); NCAA tournament Midwest Region First Round	W 81–79 ^{OT}	21–10	Hubert H. Humphrey Metrodome; Minneapolis, Minnesota
March 16, 1986*; 3:45 pm, CBS	(7 MW)	vs. (2 MW) No. 5 Michigan; NCAA Tournament Midwest Region Second Round	W 72–69	22–10	Hubert H. Humphrey Metrodome; Minneapolis
March 21, 1986*; 6:30 pm, ESPN	(7 MW)	vs. (6 MW) NC State; NCAA Tournament Midwest Region Sweet Sixteen	L 66–70	22–11	Kemper Arena; Kansas City, Missouri
*Non-conference game. ^{#}Rankings from AP poll. (#) Tournament seedings in parentheses. All times are in Central Time.

== Team players in the 1986 NBA draft ==
Round	Pick	Player	NBA club
2	46	Jeff Hornacek	Phoenix Suns
