= 1978 Missouri Valley Conference men's basketball tournament =

- Classification: Division I
- Season: 1977–78
- Teams: 9
- Site: Campus sites
- Finals site: Omaha Civic Auditorium; Omaha, Nebraska
- Champions: Creighton (1st title)
- Winning coach: Tom Apke (1st title)

1977–78 Missouri Valley Conference men's basketball standings
	Conf.				Overall
Team	W		L	PCT	W		L	PCT
Creighton †	12	–	4	.750	19	–	9	.679
Southern Illinois	11	–	5	.688	17	–	10	.630
Indiana State	11	–	5	.688	23	–	9	.719
New Mexico State	9	–	7	.563	15	–	14	.517
Bradley	8	–	8	.500	14	–	14	.500
Wichita State	8	–	8	.500	13	–	14	.481
Tulsa	7	–	9	.438	9	–	18	.333
West Texas State	4	–	12	.250	8	–	19	.296
Drake	2	–	14	.125	6	–	22	.214
† 1978 MVC tournament winner Rankings from AP Poll

The 1978 Missouri Valley Conference men's basketball tournament was held February 27–March 5; the first two rounds were played on campus sites with the semifinal and final contested at the Omaha Civic Auditorium in Omaha, Nebraska, hosted by Creighton University.

In a battle of conference newcomers, top-seeded Creighton defeated third-seeded Indiana State in the title game, 54–52, to win their first MVC tournament title.

The Bluejays, in turn, received a bid to the 1978 NCAA tournament.

== Format ==
With the addition of Creighton and Indiana State to the MVC, the tournament field increased from seven to nine.

With all teams seeded based on regular season conference records, the highest-seeded team received a triple-bye to the championship game. The remaining eight teams were placed into the first round of traditional eight-team single-elimination bracket, pairings based on seed. The winner of this preliminary bracket would then face the top seed in the title game.

== Bracket ==
=== Preliminary rounds ===
First round Monday, February 27; Campus Sites
2	Southern Illinois *	59
9	Drake	75
4	New Mexico State *	76
7	Tulsa	75
3	Indiana State *	90
8	West Texas State	71
5	Bradley *	75
6	Wichita State	71

Second round Wednesday, March 1 Campus Sites
9	Drake	73
4	New Mexico State *	90
3	Indiana State *	88
5	Bradley	81

Semifinal; Friday, March 3 Omaha Civic Auditorium
4	New Mexico State	78 ^{2OT}
3	Indiana State	80

Note: * indicates host institution

=== Championship ===
Final; Sunday, March 5 Omaha Civic Auditorium
1	Creighton	54
3	Indiana State	52
