= 1985–86 Colorado Buffaloes men's basketball team =

American college basketball season

1985–86 Colorado Buffaloes men's basketball
- Conference: Big 8 Conference
- Record: 8–20 (0–14 Big 8)
- Head coach: Tom Apke (5th season)
- Home arena: CU Events Center

1985–86 Big Eight Conference men's basketball standings
	Conf.				Overall
Team	W		L	PCT	W		L	PCT
No. 2 Kansas †	13	–	1	.929	35	–	4	.897
Iowa State	9	–	5	.643	22	–	11	.667
Nebraska	8	–	6	.571	19	–	11	.633
Missouri	8	–	6	.571	21	–	14	.600
No. 15 Oklahoma	8	–	6	.571	26	–	9	.743
Oklahoma State	6	–	8	.429	15	–	13	.536
Kansas State	4	–	10	.286	16	–	14	.533
Colorado	0	–	14	.000	8	–	20	.286
† 1986 Big Eight tournament winner As of March 31, 1986; Rankings from AP Poll

The 1985–86 Colorado Buffaloes men's basketball team represented the University of Colorado during the 1985–86 NCAA Division I men's basketball season. Led by fifth-year head coach Tom Apke, the Buffaloes played their home games at the CU Events Center in Boulder, Colorado and were members of the Big Eight Conference. They finished the season 8–20, 0–14, finishing in last place in conference play.

== Roster ==
1985–86 Colorado Buffaloes men's basketball team
Players
Coaches

Pos.	#	Name	Height	Weight	Year	Previous school	Hometown
G	4	Mike Reid	6 ft 1 in (1.85 m)	180 lb (82 kg)	Sr	Rock Island	Rock Island, IL
G	11	Michael Lee	6 ft 4 in (1.93 m)	185 lb (84 kg)	Jr	Western	Las Vegas, NV
G	21	Jeff Penix	6 ft 0 in (1.83 m)	175 lb (79 kg)	Fr	Chaparral	Las Vegas, NV
F	23	Ken Countryman	6 ft 3 in (1.91 m)	175 lb (79 kg)	Fr	Beverly Hills	Los Angeles, CA
G/F	30	Brian Robinson	6 ft 5 in (1.96 m)	195 lb (88 kg)	Fr	George Washington	Denver, CO
G	33	David Kuosman	6 ft 4 in (1.93 m)	170 lb (77 kg)	Fr	Mitchell	Colorado Springs, CO
G	35	Darren Dunlap	6 ft 3 in (1.91 m)	180 lb (82 kg)	Jr	Palmer	Colorado Springs, CO
F	44	Torin Williams	6 ft 9 in (2.06 m)	220 lb (100 kg)	So	Verbum Dei	Los Angeles, CA
C	45	Randy Downs	6 ft 9 in (2.06 m)	210 lb (95 kg)	Sr	Nogales	La Puente, CA
F/C	50	Matt Bullard	6 ft 10 in (2.08 m)	210 lb (95 kg)	Fr	Valley	West Des Moines, IA
F/C	54	Scott Wilke	6 ft 9 in (2.06 m)	230 lb (104 kg)	So	Harlan	Panama, IA
F	56	Don Yowell	6 ft 9 in (2.06 m)	220 lb (100 kg)	Sr		Arvada, CO

Head coach

- Tom Apke

Assistant coach(es)

Legend

- (C) Team captain
- (S) Suspended
- (I) Ineligible
- (W) Walk-on
- Injured
- Current redshirt

Roster

== Schedule and results ==
Date time, TV	Rank^{#}	Opponent^{#}	Result	Record	Site city, state
Non-conference regular season
Nov 23, 1985*		Fort Lewis	W 84–68	1–0	CU Events/Conference Center; Boulder, Colorado
Nov 26, 1985*		Phillips	W 81–59	2–0	CU Events/Conference Center; Boulder, Colorado
Nov 30, 1985*		Detroit	W 84–71	3–0	CU Events/Conference Center; Boulder, Colorado
Dec 2, 1985*		Santa Clara	W 101–71	4–0	CU Events/Conference Center; Boulder, Colorado
Dec 4, 1985*		at Tulsa	L 65–76	4–1	Tulsa Convention Center; Tulsa, Oklahoma
Dec 7, 1985*		Wyoming	W 74–71	5–1	CU Events/Conference Center; Boulder, Colorado
Dec 11, 1985*		Colorado State	W 78–65	6–1	CU Events/Conference Center; Boulder, Colorado
Dec 14, 1985*		at Utah	L 62–82	6–2	Special Events Center; Salt Lake City, Utah
Dec 21, 1985*		Bradley	L 69–79	6–3	CU Events/Conference Center (3,827); Boulder, Colorado
Dec 28, 1985*		at Texas Tech	W 70–62	7–3	Lubbock Municipal Coliseum; Lubbock, Texas
Jan 6, 1986*		Saint Mary's (CA)	W 80–70	8–3	CU Events/Conference Center; Boulder, Colorado
Jan 8, 1986*		at Dayton	L 66–67	8–4	UD Arena; Dayton, Ohio
Jan 11, 1986*		at Marquette	L 71–91	8–5	Milwaukee Arena; Milwaukee, Wisconsin
Big Eight Regular Season
Jan 15, 1986		No. 7 Oklahoma	L 82–94	8–6 (0–1)	CU Events/Conference Center; Boulder, Colorado
Jan 18, 1986		Kansas State	L 69–77 ^{OT}	8–7 (0–2)	CU Events/Conference Center; Boulder, Colorado
Jan 21, 1986; 7:00 p.m.		at Iowa State	L 62–90	8–8 (0–3)	Hilton Coliseum; Ames, Iowa
Jan 25, 1986		Oklahoma State	L 76–83	8–9 (0–4)	CU Events/Conference Center; Boulder, Colorado
Jan 28, 1986		at Missouri	L 67–83	8–10 (0–5)	Hearnes Center; Columbia, Missouri
Feb 1, 1986		Nebraska	L 60–77	8–11 (0–6)	CU Events/Conference Center; Boulder, Colorado
Feb 5, 1986		at No. 6 Kansas	L 64–100	8–12 (0–7)	Allen Fieldhouse; Lawrence, Kansas
Feb 8, 1986		at Kansas State	L 53–79	8–13 (0–8)	Ahearn Field House; Manhattan, Kansas
Feb 12, 1986; 8:05 p.m.		Iowa State	L 57–83	8–14 (0–9)	CU Events/Conference Center; Boulder, Colorado
Feb 15, 1986		at Oklahoma	L 73–113	8–15 (0–10)	Lloyd Noble Center; Norman, Oklahoma
Feb 19, 1986		No. 3 Kansas	L 74–79	8–16 (0–11)	CU Events/Conference Center; Boulder, Colorado
Feb 22, 1986		at Oklahoma State	L 85–90	8–17 (0–12)	Gallagher-Iba Arena; Stillwater, Oklahoma
Feb 26, 1986		at Nebraska	L 72–79	8–18 (0–13)	Bob Devaney Sports Center; Lincoln, Nebraska
Mar 1, 1986		Missouri	L 86–94	8–19 (0–14)	CU Events/Conference Center; Boulder, Colorado
Big Eight Tournament
Mar 7, 1986*; 5:10 p.m.	(7)	vs. (2) Iowa State; Quarterfinals	L 60–78	8–20	Kemper Arena (11,032); Kansas City, Missouri
*Non-conference game. ^{#}Rankings from AP Poll. (#) Tournament seedings in parentheses. All times are in Mountain Time.
