= 1985–86 Oklahoma Sooners men's basketball team =

American college basketball season

1985–86 Oklahoma Sooners men's basketball

NCAA tournament, second round
- Conference: Big Eight Conference

Ranking
- Coaches: No. 17
- AP: No. 15
- Record: 26–9 (8–6 Big Eight)
- Head coach: Billy Tubbs (6th season)
- Assistant coaches: Mike Mims; Jim Kerwin (2nd season); Mike Anderson
- Home arena: Lloyd Noble Center (Capacity: 10,871)

1985–86 Big Eight Conference men's basketball standings
	Conf.				Overall
Team	W		L	PCT	W		L	PCT
No. 2 Kansas †	13	–	1	.929	35	–	4	.897
Iowa State	9	–	5	.643	22	–	11	.667
Nebraska	8	–	6	.571	19	–	11	.633
Missouri	8	–	6	.571	21	–	14	.600
No. 15 Oklahoma	8	–	6	.571	26	–	9	.743
Oklahoma State	6	–	8	.429	15	–	13	.536
Kansas State	4	–	10	.286	16	–	14	.533
Colorado	0	–	14	.000	8	–	20	.286
† 1986 Big Eight tournament winner As of March 31, 1986; Rankings from AP Poll

The 1985–86 Oklahoma Sooners men's basketball team represented the University of Oklahoma in competitive college basketball during the 1985–86 NCAA Division I men's basketball season. The Oklahoma Sooners men's basketball team played its home games in the Lloyd Noble Center and was a member of the National Collegiate Athletic Association's (NCAA) former Big Eight Conference at that time.

After winning 17 straight (and 21 of 22) to begin the season – peaking at No. 5 in the AP poll, the team posted a 26–9 overall record and a 8–6 conference record, finishing 5th in the Big 8 standings. The Sooners received a bid to the 1986 NCAA Tournament, and advanced to the second round where they fell to DePaul.

== Roster ==
1985–86 Oklahoma Sooners men's basketball team
Players
Coaches

Pos.	#	Name	Height	Weight	Year	Previous school	Hometown
F	21	Mike Bell	6 ft 5 in (1.96 m)	201 lb (91 kg)	Fr	Robert E. Lee	Montgomery, AL
G/F	25	Anthony Bowie	6 ft 6 in (1.98 m)	190 lb (86 kg)	Sr	East Central	Tulsa, Oklahoma
G	23	Chris Durley	6 ft 3 in (1.91 m)	210 lb (95 kg)	Fr	Douglass	Oklahoma City, OK
G	14	Ricky Grace	6 ft 1 in (1.85 m)	172 lb (78 kg)	So	Wilmer–Hutchins	Dallas, TX
F	25	Harvey Grant	6 ft 8 in (2.03 m)	200 lb (91 kg)	So	Independence CC	Sparta, GA
F/C	55	David Johnson	6 ft 7 in (2.01 m)	265 lb (120 kg)	Jr	Wyandotte	Kansas City, KS
F	22	Tyrone Jones	6 ft 5 in (1.96 m)	215 lb (98 kg)	Fr	Dunbar	Washington, D.C.
F	30	Darryl Kennedy	6 ft 5 in (1.96 m)	224 lb (102 kg)	Jr	NW Classen	Oklahoma City, OK
C	33	Stacey King	6 ft 10 in (2.08 m)	229 lb (104 kg)	Fr	Lawton	Lawton, OK
G	32	Tim McCalister	6 ft 3 in (1.91 m)	203 lb (92 kg)	Jr	West Side	Gary, IN
G	20	Art Pollard	6 ft 2 in (1.88 m)	184 lb (83 kg)	Fr	Roosevelt	East Chicago, IN
F	44	Dave Sieger	6 ft 5 in (1.96 m)	207 lb (94 kg)	So	San Gorgonio	San Bernardino, CA
F	32	Andre Wiley	6 ft 5 in (1.96 m)	197 lb (89 kg)	Fr	Southwestern	Flint, MI

Head coach

- Billy Tubbs

Assistant coach(es)

- Mike Mims
- Jim Kerwin
- Mike Anderson

Legend

- (C) Team captain
- (S) Suspended
- (I) Ineligible
- (W) Walk-on
- Injured
- Current redshirt

Roster

== Schedule and results ==
Date time, TV	Rank^{#}	Opponent^{#}	Result	Record	Site (attendance) city, state
Non-conference regular season
Nov 22, 1985*	No. 13	UC Santa Barbara	W 107–92	1–0	Lloyd Noble Center; Norman, Oklahoma
Nov 26, 1985*	No. 13	at Hawaii Loa	W 113–59	2–0	Hawaii-Loa Gym
Nov 29, 1985*	No. 13	vs. Marshall	W 81–70	3–0	Hawaii-Loa Gym
Nov 30, 1985*	No. 13	vs. No. 7 Illinois	W 59–57	4–0	Hawaii-Loa Gym
Dec 1, 1985*	No. 8	at Hawaii–Hilo	W 91–68	5–0	Afook-Chinen Civic Auditorium
Dec 6, 1985*	No. 8	Penn State	W 85–63	6–0	Lloyd Noble Center; Norman, Oklahoma
Dec 9, 1985*	No. 8	West Texas A&M	W 79–58	7–0	Lloyd Noble Center; Norman, Oklahoma
Dec 14, 1985*	No. 8	Texas	W 93–92 ^{OT}	8–0	Lloyd Noble Center; Norman, Oklahoma
Dec 21, 1985*	No. 8	New Orleans	W 103–85	9–0	Lloyd Noble Center; Norman, Oklahoma
Dec 27, 1985*	No. 8	vs. Cincinnati; All-College Tournament	W 68–65	10–0	Myriad Convention Center; Oklahoma City, Oklahoma
Dec 28, 1985*	No. 8	vs. SMU; All-College Tournament	W 92–69	11–0	Myriad Convention Center; Oklahoma City, Oklahoma
Jan 3, 1986*	No. 7	Austin Peay	W 100–68	12–0	Lloyd Noble Center; Norman, Oklahoma
Jan 4, 1986*	No. 7	Southeastern Louisiana	W 103–66	13–0	Lloyd Noble Center; Norman, Oklahoma
Jan 8, 1986*	No. 7	Denver	W 109–64	14–0	Lloyd Noble Center; Norman, Oklahoma
Jan 11, 1986*	No. 7	Chicago State	W 98–73	15–0	Lloyd Noble Center; Norman, Oklahoma
Big 8 Regular Season
Jan 15, 1986	No. 7	at Colorado	W 94–82	16–0 (1–0)	CU Events/Conference Center; Boulder, Colorado
Jan 18, 1986	No. 7	Iowa State	W 95–82	17–0 (2–0)	Lloyd Noble Center; Norman, Oklahoma
Jan 21, 1986	No. 5	at No. 7 Kansas	L 92–98	17–1 (2–1)	Allen Fieldhouse; Lawrence, Kansas
Jan 25, 1986	No. 5	at Kansas State	W 83–80	18–1 (3–1)	Ahearn Field House; Manhattan, Kansas
Jan 29, 1986	No. 6	Nebraska	W 87–60	19–1 (4–1)	Lloyd Noble Center; Norman, Oklahoma
Feb 1, 1986	No. 6	Missouri	W 88–84	20–1 (5–1)	Lloyd Noble Center; Norman, Oklahoma
Feb 5, 1986	No. 5	Oklahoma State	W 106–84	21–1 (6–1)	Lloyd Noble Center; Norman, Oklahoma
Feb 8, 1986	No. 5	at Iowa State	L 70–73	21–2 (6–2)	Hilton Coliseum; Ames, Iowa
Feb 11, 1986		Kansas State	W 85–77	22–2 (7–2)	Lloyd Noble Center; Norman, Oklahoma
Feb 13, 1986		at Missouri	L 88–101	22–3 (7–3)	Hearnes Center; Columbia, Missouri
Feb 15, 1986		Colorado	W 113–73	23–3 (8–3)	Lloyd Noble Center; Norman, Oklahoma
Feb 19, 1986		at Nebraska	L 64–66	23–4 (8–4)	Bob Devaney Sports Center; Lincoln, Nebraska
Feb 22, 1986		at No. 2 Duke	L 84–93	23–5	Cameron Indoor Stadium; Durham, North Carolina
Feb 24, 1986		No. 2 Kansas	L 80–87	23–6 (8–5)	Lloyd Noble Center; Norman, Oklahoma
Mar 1, 1986	No. 14	No. 18 NC State	W 72–69	24–6	Lloyd Noble Center; Norman, Oklahoma
Mar 3, 1986	No. 14	at Oklahoma State	L 84–87	24–7 (8–6)	Gallagher-Iba Arena; Stillwater, Oklahoma
Big 8 Tournament
Mar 6, 1986*	No. 15	vs. Missouri; Quarterfinals	W 78–75	25–7	Kemper Arena; Kansas City, Missouri
Mar 7, 1986*	No. 15	vs. No. 2 Kansas; Semifinals	L 70–72	25–8	Kemper Arena; Kansas City, Missouri
NCAA Tournament
Mar 13, 1986*	(4 E) No. 15	vs. (13 E) Northeastern; First Round	W 80–74	26–8	Greensboro Coliseum; Greensboro, North Carolina
Mar 15, 1986*	(4 E) No. 15	vs. (12 E) DePaul; Second Round	L 69–74	26–9	Greensboro Coliseum; Greensboro, North Carolina
*Non-conference game. ^{#}Rankings from AP Poll. (#) Tournament seedings in parentheses. All times are in Central Time. (#) during NCAA Tournament is seed within region E=East.

== 1986 NBA draft ==
Round	Pick	Player	Position	NBA club
3	66	Anthony Bowie	Guard	Houston Rockets
