= 1985–86 Tulsa Golden Hurricane men's basketball team =

American college basketball season

1985–86 Tulsa Golden Hurricane men's basketball

MVC tournament champions

NCAA tournament
- Conference: Missouri Valley Conference
- Record: 23–9 (10–6 MVC)
- Head coach: J. D. Barnett (1st season)
- Home arena: Tulsa Convention Center

1985–86 Missouri Valley Conference men's basketball standings
	Conf.				Overall
Team	W		L	PCT	W		L	PCT
No. 14 Bradley	16	–	0	1.000	32	–	3	.914
Tulsa †	10	–	6	.625	23	–	9	.719
Drake	10	–	6	.625	19	–	11	.633
Illinois State	9	–	7	.563	15	–	14	.517
Wichita State	7	–	9	.438	14	–	14	.500
Creighton	7	–	9	.438	12	–	16	.429
Indiana State	7	–	9	.438	11	–	17	.393
West Texas State	4	–	12	.250	11	–	17	.393
Southern Illinois	4	–	12	.250	8	–	20	.286
† 1986 MVC tournament winner Rankings from AP Poll

The 1985–86 Tulsa Golden Hurricane men's basketball team represented the University of Tulsa as a member of the Missouri Valley Conference during the 1985–86 college basketball season. The Golden Hurricane played their home games at the Tulsa Convention Center. Led by head coach J. D. Barnett, they finished the season 23–9 overall and 10–6 in conference play to finish second in the MVC standings. The Golden Hurricane defeated Bradley in the championship game of the MVC tournament to receive an automatic bid to the NCAA tournament as the No. 10 seed in the East region. Tulsa lost to No. 7 seed Navy in the opening round.

== Roster ==
1985–86 Tulsa Golden Hurricane men's basketball team
Players
Coaches

Pos.	#	Name	Height	Weight	Year	Hometown
G	21	Byron Boudreaux	6 ft 4 in (1.93 m)	—	Jr
G	35	Tracy Moore	6 ft 5 in (1.96 m)	195 lb (88 kg)	So	Oklahoma City, Oklahoma

Head coach

J. D. Barnett

Assistant coach(es)

Legend

- (C) Team captain
- (S) Suspended
- (I) Ineligible
- (W) Walk-on
- Injured
- Current redshirt

== Schedule and results ==
Date time, TV	Rank^{#}	Opponent^{#}	Result	Record	Site (attendance) city, state
Regular season
Nov 22, 1985*		vs. Dayton; Preseason NIT	W 63–60	1–0	Riverfront Coliseum (10,416); Cincinnati, Ohio
Nov 23, 1985*		vs. No. 9 Louisville; Preseason NIT	L 74–80	1–1	Riverfront Coliseum (6,720); Cincinnati, Ohio
Dec 4, 1985*		Colorado	W 76–65	3–1	Tulsa Convention Center (6,131); Tulsa, Oklahoma
Dec 7, 1985*		at Washington	L 68–72	3–2	Bank of America Arena (3,951); Seattle, Washington
Dec 10, 1985*		Arizona	W 54–51	4–2	Tulsa Convention Center (4,208); Tulsa, Oklahoma
Dec 19, 1985*		Oral Roberts	W 63–47	5–2	Tulsa Convention Center (7,522); Tulsa, Oklahoma
Dec 21, 1985*		at Oklahoma State	W 67–58	6–2	Gallagher-Iba Arena (4,370); Stillwater, Oklahoma
Dec 27, 1985*		McNeese State	W 81–62	7–2	Tulsa Convention Center (7,643); Tulsa, Oklahoma
Dec 28, 1985*		Jacksonville	W 67–57	8–2	Tulsa Convention Center (8,184); Tulsa, Oklahoma
MVC Tournament
Mar 3, 1986*		Indiana State; Quarterfinals	W 68–50	21–8	Tulsa Convention Center (5,138); Tulsa, Oklahoma
Mar 4, 1986*		Drake; Semifinals	W 68–67	22–8	Tulsa Convention Center (5,469); Tulsa, Oklahoma
Mar 5, 1986*		No. 9 Bradley; Championship game	W 74–58	23–8	Tulsa Convention Center (6,313); Tulsa, Oklahoma
NCAA Tournament
Mar 14, 1986*	(10 E)	vs. (7 E) No. 17 Navy; First Round	L 68–87	23–9	Carrier Dome (12,000); Syracuse, New York
*Non-conference game. ^{#}Rankings from AP. (#) Tournament seedings in parentheses. E=East. All times are in Central.
