= J. D. Barnett =

American basketball coach

Biographical details
- Born: January 10, 1944 (age 82); Meadville, Missouri, U.S.

Playing career
- 1964–1966: Winona State

Coaching career (HC unless noted)
- 1970–1971: Lenoir–Rhyne
- 1971–1972: High Point
- 1973–1977: West Texas State (asst.)
- 1977–1979: Louisiana Tech
- 1979–1985: VCU
- 1985–1991: Tulsa
- 1994–1999: Northwestern State
- 2004–2005: Hawaii Pacific

Administrative career (AD unless noted)
- 1991–1994: Tulsa Union HS
- 1994–1999: Northwestern State (assoc.)
- 2000–2004: Tulane (assoc.)
- 2004–2005: Hawaii Pacific

Head coaching record
- Overall: 356–272
- Tournaments: 4–7 (NCAA Division I); 0–2 (NIT)

Accomplishments and honors

Championships
- 4 Sun Belt regular season (1981, 1983–1985); 3 Sun Belt tournament (1980, 1981, 1985); MVC regular season (1987); MVC tournament (1986)

Awards
- Southland Coach of the Year (1979); 2× Sun Belt Coach of the Year (1983, 1984); MVC Coach of the Year (1987)

Joseph Donald Barnett (born January 10, 1944) is an American retired college basketball coach. He was a former head basketball coach at several Division I institutions, the most high-profile being Virginia Commonwealth University, where his most notable win consisted of a buzzer-beater NCAA Tournament win over Jim Calhoun's Northeastern Huskies. He is also well known for being a mentor of Tubby Smith. Most notably, Barnett taught Smith the philosophy of ball-line defense, which is a strategy that requires all defenders to stay between the line of the ball and the baseline. His last head coaching position was in 2004–2005, when Barnett was both the head coach and athletic director at Division II Hawaii Pacific.

Barnett graduated from Winona State University in 1966 with two varsity letters each in baseball and basketball. He was inducted into the school's athletic hall of fame in 2002.

== Coaching career ==
Barnett has a career record of 317–229 (.580) in Division I basketball, including 7 NCAA tournament appearances. During his stay at Virginia Commonwealth, Barnett led the Rams to 5 NCAA tournament appearances, with 4 of those resulting in 1st round victories. In his first two years at Tulsa, he led the Golden Hurricane to back-to-back NCAA tournament appearances. Both of those, however, resulted in 1st round exits. That was the last time Barnett made the NCAAs.

Also, Maurice Cheeks, former head coach of the Philadelphia 76ers, was recruited by and played under Barnett while he was an assistant coach at West Texas State. While at West Texas State, Barnett is credited with organizing "The Cager Club", a support group that helped the basketball program.

In addition, Tom Izzo was hired by Barnett to be his recruiting coordinator at Tulsa. Izzo left a low-paying student assistant position with Jud Heathcote to take the position with Tulsa. That experiment lasted all of seven weeks before Heathcote called Izzo offering him an assistant coaching position back in East Lansing.

== Administrative career ==
From 1991 to 1994, Barnett was athletic director at Union High School in Tulsa, Oklahoma. Barnett also served as associate athletic director at Northwestern State while head men's basketball coach from 1994 to 1999. From 2000 to 2004, Barnett was senior associate athletic director for revenue development at Tulane University in New Orleans.

== Head coaching record ==
Record table
Season	Team	Overall	Conference	Standing	Postseason
Lenoir–Rhyne Bears (NCAA College Division independent) (1970–1971)
1970–71	Lenoir–Rhyne	17–9			
Lenoir–Rhyne:		17–9			
High Point (NCAA College Division independent) (1971–1972)
1971–72	High Point	13–16			
High Point:		13–16			
Louisiana Tech Bulldogs (Southland Conference) (1977–1979)
1977–78	Louisiana Tech	6–21	2–8	T–5th	
1978–79	Louisiana Tech	17–8	6–4	T–2nd	
Louisiana Tech:		23–29	8–12		
VCU Rams (Sun Belt Conference) (1979–1985)
1979–80	VCU	18–12	8–6	5th	NCAA Division I First Round
1980–81	VCU	24–5	9–3	T–1st	NCAA Division I Second Round
1981–82	VCU	17–11	7–3	2nd	
1982–83	VCU	24–7	12–2	T–1st	NCAA Division I Second Round
1983–84	VCU	23–7	11–3	1st	NCAA Division I Second Round
1984–85	VCU	26–6	12–2	1st	NCAA Division I Second Round
VCU:		132–48	59–19		
Tulsa Golden Hurricane (Missouri Valley Conference) (1985–1991)
1985–86	Tulsa	23–9	10–6	T–2nd	NCAA Division I First Round
1986–87	Tulsa	22–8	11–3	1st	NCAA Division I First Round
1987–88	Tulsa	8–20	4–10	7th	
1988–89	Tulsa	18–13	10–4	T–2nd	
1989–90	Tulsa	17–13	9–5	T–2nd	NIT First Round
1990–91	Tulsa	18–12	10–6	3rd	NIT First Round
Tulsa:		106–75	54–34		
Northwestern State Demons (Southland Conference) (1994–1999)
1994–95	Northwestern State	13–14	8–10	6th	
1995–96	Northwestern State	5–21	3–15	10th	
1996–97	Northwestern State	13–15	8–8	T–4th	
1997–98	Northwestern State	13–14	10–6	T–2nd	
1998–99	Northwestern State	11–15	8–10	T–7th	
Northwestern State:		55–79	37–49		
Hawaii Pacific Sea Warriors (Pacific West Conference) (2004–2005)
2004–05	Hawaii Pacific	10–16	4–11	5th	
Hawaii Pacific:		10–16	4–11		
Total:		356–272			
National champion Postseason invitational champion Conference regular season champion Conference regular season and conference tournament champion Division regular season champion Division regular season and conference tournament champion Conference tournament champion
