= Tom Apke =

American basketball coach

Biographical details
- Born: July 16, 1943 (age 83)

Playing career
- 1962–1965: Creighton

Coaching career (HC unless noted)
- 1974–1981: Creighton
- 1981–1986: Colorado
- 1986–1996: Appalachian State

Administrative career (AD unless noted)
- 1974–1980: Creighton

Head coaching record
- Overall: 328–292 (.529)
- Tournaments: 0–3 (NCAA Division I); 0–1 (NIT)

Accomplishments and honors

Championships
- MVC regular season (1978); 2 MVC tournament (1978, 1981)

Awards
- MVC Coach of the Year (1978); SoCon Coach of the Year (1988)

Tom Apke (born July 16, 1943) was a college basketball coach at Creighton, Colorado, and Appalachian State. From 1974 to 1981, he coached at Creighton, where he compiled a 130–64 record. From 1981 to 1986, he coached at Colorado, where he compiled a 59–81 record. From 1986 to 1996, he served as the head basketball coach at Appalachian State. During his ten-year tenure, he compiled a 139–147 record.

== Basketball head coaching record ==
Record table
Season	Team	Overall	Conference	Standing	Postseason
Creighton Bluejays (Independent) (1974–1977)
1974–75	Creighton	20–7			NCAA Division I first round
1975–76	Creighton	19–7			
1976–77	Creighton	21–7			NIT first round
Creighton Bluejays (Missouri Valley Conference) (1977–1981)
1977–78	Creighton	19–9	12–4	1st	NCAA Division I first round
1978–79	Creighton	14–13	8–8	T–3rd	
1979–80	Creighton	16–12	9–7	T–2nd	
1980–81	Creighton	21–9	11–5	T–2nd	NCAA Division I first round
Creighton:		130–64 (.670)	40–24 (.625)		
Colorado Buffaloes (Big Eight Conference) (1981–1986)
1981–82	Colorado	11–16	3–11		
1982–83	Colorado	13–15	3–11		
1983–84	Colorado	16–13	6–8		
1984–85	Colorado	11–17	5–9		
1985–86	Colorado	8–20	0–14		
Colorado:		59–81 (.421)	17–53 (.243)		
Appalachian State Mountaineers (Southern Conference) (1986–1996)
1986–87	Appalachian State	7–21	3–13	8th	
1987–88	Appalachian State	16–13	8–8	T–4th	
1988–89	Appalachian State	20–8	8–6	3rd	
1989–90	Appalachian State	19–11	8–6	3rd	
1990–91	Appalachian State	16–14	7–7	T–2nd	
1991–92	Appalachian State	15–14	9–5	T–2nd	
1992–93	Appalachian State	13–15	8–10	T–5th	
1993–94	Appalachian State	16–11	12–6	3rd	
1994–95	Appalachian State	9–20	4–10	5th (North)	
1995–96	Appalachian State	8–20	3–11	T–4th (North)	
Appalachian State:		139–147 (.486)	70–82 (.461)		
Total:		328–292 (.529)			
National champion Postseason invitational champion Conference regular season champion Conference regular season and conference tournament champion Division regular season champion Division regular season and conference tournament champion Conference tournament champion
