= 1986 Big Eight Conference men's basketball tournament =

- Classification: Division I
- Season: 1985–86
- Teams: 8
- Finals site: Kemper Arena; Kansas City, MO
- Champions: Kansas (3rd title)
- Winning coach: Larry Brown (2nd title)
- MVP: Danny Manning (Kansas)

1985–86 Big Eight Conference men's basketball standings
| | Conf. | | | | Overall |
| Team | W | | L | PCT | W | | L | PCT |
|---|---|---|---|---|---|---|---|---|
| No. 2 Kansas † | 13 | – | 1 | .929 | 35 | – | 4 | .897 |
| Iowa State | 9 | – | 5 | .643 | 22 | – | 11 | .667 |
| Nebraska | 8 | – | 6 | .571 | 19 | – | 11 | .633 |
| Missouri | 8 | – | 6 | .571 | 21 | – | 14 | .600 |
| No. 15 Oklahoma | 8 | – | 6 | .571 | 26 | – | 9 | .743 |
| Oklahoma State | 6 | – | 8 | .429 | 15 | – | 13 | .536 |
| Kansas State | 4 | – | 10 | .286 | 16 | – | 14 | .533 |
| Colorado | 0 | – | 14 | .000 | 8 | – | 20 | .286 |
† 1986 Big Eight tournament winner As of March 31, 1986; Rankings from AP Poll

The 1986 Big Eight Conference men's basketball tournament was held March 6–8 at Kemper Arena in Kansas City, Missouri.

Top-seeded Kansas defeated #2 seed Iowa State in the championship game, 73–71, to win the Big Eight men's basketball tournament.

The Jayhawks received an automatic bid to the 1986 NCAA tournament. They were joined in the tournament by fellow Big Eight members Iowa State, Missouri, Nebraska, and Oklahoma, who earned at-large bids.

== Format ==
All eight of the conference's members participated in the tournament field. They were seeded based on regular season conference records, with all teams placed and paired in the initial quarterfinal round.

All three rounds – quarterfinals, semifinals and championship game – were played at Kemper Arena in Kansas City, Missouri.

== Bracket ==
Quarterfinals; Friday, March 7
1 | #2 Kansas | 74
8 | Kansas State | 51
5 | #15 Oklahoma | 78
4 | Missouri | 75
3 | Nebraska | 82
6 | Oklahoma State | 75
7 | Colorado | 60
2 | Iowa State | 78

Semifinals; Saturday, March 8
1 | #2 Kansas | 72
5 | #15 Oklahoma | 70
3 | Nebraska | 58
2 | Iowa State | 75

Championship; Sunday, March 9
1 | #2 Kansas | 73
2 | Iowa State | 71
