= 1985–86 Missouri Tigers men's basketball team =

American college basketball season

1985–86 Missouri Tigers men's basketball

Rainbow Classic champions

NCAA tournament, first round
- Conference: Big Eight Conference
- Record: 21–14 (8–6 Big 8)
- Head coach: Norm Stewart (19th season)
- Assistant coaches: Bob Sundvold (5th season); Rich Daly (3rd season); Anthony Smith (1st season)
- Home arena: Hearnes Center

1985–86 Big Eight Conference men's basketball standings
	Conf.				Overall
Team	W		L	PCT	W		L	PCT
No. 2 Kansas †	13	–	1	.929	35	–	4	.897
Iowa State	9	–	5	.643	22	–	11	.667
Nebraska	8	–	6	.571	19	–	11	.633
Missouri	8	–	6	.571	21	–	14	.600
No. 15 Oklahoma	8	–	6	.571	26	–	9	.743
Oklahoma State	6	–	8	.429	15	–	13	.536
Kansas State	4	–	10	.286	16	–	14	.533
Colorado	0	–	14	.000	8	–	20	.286
† 1986 Big Eight tournament winner As of March 31, 1986; Rankings from AP Poll

The 1985–86 Missouri Tigers men's basketball team represented the University of Missouri as a member of the Big Eight Conference during the 1985–86 NCAA men's basketball season. Led by head coach Norm Stewart, the Tigers finished 4th in the Big Eight regular season standings and received an at-large bid to the NCAA tournament as No. 11 seed in the West region. The Tigers were beaten by No. 6 seed UAB, 66–64, in the opening round and finished with an overall record of 21–14 (8–6 Big Eight).

== Roster ==
1985–86 Missouri Tigers men's basketball team
Players
Coaches

Pos.	#	Name	Height	Weight	Year	Hometown
G/F	3	Derrick Chievous	6 ft 7 in (2.01 m)	190 lb (86 kg)	So	New York, New York
G	12	Jeff Strong	6 ft 1 in (1.85 m)	171 lb (78 kg)	Sr	Chattanooga, Tennessee
G	15	Gerry Coleman	6 ft 4 in (1.93 m)	183 lb (83 kg)	Jr	Centralia, Missouri
G	22	Bill Roundtree	6 ft 1 in (1.85 m)	178 lb (81 kg)	Sr	Wellsville, Missouri
G	23	Robyn Davis	6 ft 3 in (1.91 m)	190 lb (86 kg)	Fr	Maywood, Illinois
G	24	Lynn Hardy	6 ft 2 in (1.88 m)	179 lb (81 kg)	So	Detroit, Michigan
G	25	Steve Musser	6 ft 5 in (1.96 m)	193 lb (88 kg)	Sr	St. Louis, Missouri
F	32	Kurt Brockman	6 ft 8 in (2.03 m)	201 lb (91 kg)	So	Springfield, Missouri
G/F	33	Greg Church	6 ft 7 in (2.01 m)	205 lb (93 kg)	Fr	Palmyra, Missouri
F/C	35	Bradd Sutton	6 ft 9 in (2.06 m)	200 lb (91 kg)	Fr	Grand Rapids, Michigan
G/F	42	Mike Sandbothe	6 ft 8 in (2.03 m)	203 lb (92 kg)	Fr	Washington, Missouri
F	44	Mike Potthoff	6 ft 8 in (2.03 m)	198 lb (90 kg)	So	St. Charles, Missouri
C	52	Gary Leonard	7 ft 0 in (2.13 m)	248 lb (112 kg)	Fr	Belleville, Illinois
F	54	Dan Bingenheimer	6 ft 9 in (2.06 m)	230 lb (104 kg)	Sr	Belvidere, Illinois

Head coach

- Norm Stewart (Missouri)

Assistant coach(es)

- Bob Sundvold
- Rich Daly
- Anthony Smith

Legend

- (C) Team captain
- (S) Suspended
- (I) Ineligible
- (W) Walk-on
- Injured
- Current redshirt

Roster

== Schedule and results ==
Date time, TV	Rank^{#}	Opponent^{#}	Result	Record	Site (attendance) city, state
Non-conference regular season
Nov 22, 1985*		Texas Southern	W 95–63	1–0	Hearnes Center; Columbia, Missouri
Nov 25, 1985*		California	W 61–46	2–0	Hearnes Center; Columbia, Missouri
Nov 29, 1985*		vs. No. 1 North Carolina; Great Alaska Shootout	L 63–84	2–1	Sullivan Arena; Anchorage, Alaska
Nov 30, 1985*		at Alaska Anchorage; Great Alaska Shootout	L 56–59	2–2	Sullivan Arena; Anchorage, Alaska
Dec 1, 1985*		vs. UTSA; Great Alaska Shootout	W 80–47	3–2	Sullivan Arena; Anchorage, Alaska
Dec 7, 1985*		St. Bonaventure	W 67–55	4–2	Hearnes Center; Columbia, Missouri
Dec 9, 1985*		Western Illinois	W 91–64	5–2	Hearnes Center; Columbia, Missouri
Dec 11, 1985*		Middle Tennessee State	W 81–77	6–2	Hearnes Center; Columbia, Missouri
Dec 14, 1985*		at Tennessee	L 54–67	6–3	Stokely Athletic Center; Knoxville, Tennessee
Dec 16, 1985*		Southern Illinois	W 77–42	7–3	Hearnes Center; Columbia, Missouri
Dec 21, 1985*		vs. No. 15 Illinois; Braggin' Rights	L 55–67	7–4	St. Louis Arena (13,106); St. Louis, Missouri
Dec 27, 1985*		vs. Villanova; Rainbow Classic	W 72–53	8–4	Neal S. Blaisdell Center; Honolulu, Hawaii
Dec 28, 1985*		vs. Clemson; Rainbow Classic	W 69–64	9–4	Neal S. Blaisdell Center; Honolulu, Hawaii
Dec 29, 1985*		vs. Washington State; Rainbow Classic	W 70–63	10–4	Neal S. Blaisdell Center; Honolulu, Hawaii
Jan 4, 1986*		Southern Indiana	W 82–75	11–4	Hearnes Center; Columbia, Missouri
Jan 6, 1986*		Mississippi Valley State	W 81–67	12–4	Hearnes Center; Columbia, Missouri
Jan 8, 1986*		Florida Southern	W 65–58	13–4	Hearnes Center; Columbia, Missouri
Big Eight Regular Season
Jan 11, 1986		at Iowa State	L 84–92	13–5 (0–1)	Hilton Coliseum; Ames, Iowa
Jan 14, 1986		Oklahoma State	W 55–51	14–5 (1–1)	Hearnes Center; Columbia, Missouri
Jan 18, 1986		at Nebraska	W 68–67	15–5 (2–1)	Bob Devaney Sports Center; Lincoln, Nebraska
Jan 14, 1986		at Kansas State	W 74–70	16–5 (3–1)	Ahearn Field House; Manhattan, Kansas
Jan 23, 1986		No. 7 Kansas; Border War	L 77–81	16–6 (3–2)	Hearnes Center; Columbia, Missouri
Jan 25, 1986*		at No. 3 Memphis State	L 68–79	16–7	Mid-South Coliseum (11,200); Memphis, Tennessee
Jan 28, 1986		Colorado	W 83–67	17–7 (4–2)	Hearnes Center; Columbia, Missouri
Feb 1, 1986		at No. 6 Oklahoma	L 84–88	17–8 (4–3)	Lloyd Noble Center; Norman, Oklahoma
Feb 8, 1986		Nebraska	L 66–75	17–9 (4–4)	Hearnes Center; Columbia, Missouri
Feb 9, 1986*		Virginia	L 62–64	17–10	Hearnes Center; Columbia, Missouri
Feb 11, 1986		No. 3 Kansas; Border War	L 66–100	17–11 (4–5)	Allen Fieldhouse; Lawrence, Kansas
Feb 13, 1986		Oklahoma	W 101–88	18–11 (5–5)	Hearnes Center; Columbia, Missouri
Feb 15, 1986		at Oklahoma State	L 65–86	18–12 (5–6)	Gallagher-Iba Arena; Stillwater, Oklahoma
Feb 18, 1986		Iowa State	W 71–62	19–12 (6–6)	Hearnes Center; Columbia, Missouri
Feb 26, 1986		Kansas State	W 84–69	20–12 (7–6)	Hearnes Center; Columbia, Missouri
Mar 1, 1986		at Colorado	W 94–86	21–12 (8–6)	CU Events/Conference Center; Boulder, Colorado
Big Eight Conference tournament
Mar 7, 1986*	(4)	vs. (5) No. 15 Oklahoma; Quarterfinals	L 75–78	21–13	Kemper Arena (11.298); Kansas City, Missouri
NCAA tournament
Mar 13, 1986*	(11 W)	vs. (6 W) UAB; First Round	L 64–66	21–14	Dee Events Center; Ogden, Utah
*Non-conference game. ^{#}Rankings from AP poll. (#) Tournament seedings in parentheses. W=West. All times are in Central.
