= Disappearance of Jason Jolkowski =

Unsolved American missing person case from Omaha in 2001

Jason Jolkowski
- Born: Jason Anthony Jolkowski; June 24, 1981 (age 45); Grand Island, Nebraska, U.S.
- Disappeared: June 13, 2001 (aged 19); Omaha, Nebraska, U.S.
- Status: Missing for 25 years, 2 months and 5 days
- Known for: Missing person
- Height: 6 ft 1 in (1.85 m)
- Parents: Jim Jolkowski (father); Kelly Murphy (mother)
- Relatives: Michael Jolkowski (brother)

On June 13, 2001, Jason Anthony Jolkowski, a 19-year-old from Omaha, Nebraska, disappeared while walking from his home to his former high school to meet a co-worker for a ride to work. He has not been seen since. In the aftermath of his disappearance, his parents successfully campaigned for the creation of Jason's Law, a statewide database intended to improve the reporting and tracking of missing persons in Nebraska. As of 2026, Jolkowski's whereabouts remain unknown.

== Background ==
Jason Anthony Jolkowski was born on June 24, 1981, in Grand Island, Nebraska. At the time he disappeared, Jolkowski was living in his parents' home on 48th and Pinkney Street in the Benson neighborhood of Omaha. He was a part-time student in the radio broadcasting program at Iowa Western Community College in Council Bluffs, Iowa, and worked at a local Fazoli's restaurant at 80th and Cass Street in Omaha. It was reported that he planned to eventually become a radio DJ for KIWR. Jolkowski's mother described him as "shy" and "a quiet boy" with only "a small handful of friends".

== Disappearance ==
Locations, Omaha, Nebraska
1 Jolkowski home.
2 Benson High School.
3 Fazolis.

On Wednesday, June 13, 2001, Jolkowski was called into work early. Due to his car being at a repair shop, he initially planned to walk to his job, which was located over four miles (6.4 km) away, but eventually made arrangements for a co-worker to give him a ride. Since Jolkowski had trouble giving directions, he arranged for them to meet at Benson High School, which he and his co-worker had previously attended. The school was eight blocks (half a mile) from his home. Jolkowski was wearing a white Chicago Cubs t-shirt (possibly featuring Sammy Sosa), black dress pants, black dress shoes, and a blue Cubs cap. He was also carrying his red Fazoli's work t-shirt.

At 10:45 a.m., Jolkowski was last seen by a neighbor, who saw him help his younger brother pull trash cans from the curb back to the house. Less than an hour later, between 11:15 and 11:30 a.m., his co-worker called his house stating that he had failed to turn up at Benson High for the ride to work. Jolkowski has not been seen or heard from since then. Shortly after his disappearance, the school's security cameras were checked, but none of them showed Jolkowski arriving at the school.

A police officer investigating his disappearance deemed it "the most baffling case" he had seen in thirty years. The Omaha Police Department continues to investigate the case.

== Impact ==
Following the disappearance, Jolkowski's mother and father created Project Jason to help families through a loved one's disappearance. In 2005, after lobbying by his parents, "Jason's Law" was passed by Nebraska Legislature, providing for a statewide database on missing persons. Kelly Jolkowski, Jason's mother, later received a Volunteer for Victims award from U.S. Attorney General Eric Holder in 2010 and the Nebraska Governor's Points of Light Award in 2014 in recognition of her work to support families of missing people.

== See also ==
- List of people who disappeared mysteriously (2000–present)
