= 1986 Missouri Valley Conference men's basketball tournament =

- Classification: Division I
- Season: 1985–86
- Teams: 8
- Site: Tulsa Convention Center; Tulsa, Oklahoma
- Champions: Tulsa (3rd title)
- Winning coach: J. D. Barnett (1st title)
- MVP: Brian Rahilly (Tulsa)

1985–86 Missouri Valley Conference men's basketball standings
	Conf.				Overall
Team	W		L	PCT	W		L	PCT
No. 14 Bradley	16	–	0	1.000	32	–	3	.914
Tulsa †	10	–	6	.625	23	–	9	.719
Drake	10	–	6	.625	19	–	11	.633
Illinois State	9	–	7	.563	15	–	14	.517
Wichita State	7	–	9	.438	14	–	14	.500
Creighton	7	–	9	.438	12	–	16	.429
Indiana State	7	–	9	.438	11	–	17	.393
West Texas State	4	–	12	.250	11	–	17	.393
Southern Illinois	4	–	12	.250	8	–	20	.286
† 1986 MVC tournament winner Rankings from AP Poll

The 1986 Missouri Valley Conference men's basketball tournament was played after the conclusion of the 1985–1986 regular season at the Tulsa Convention Center in Tulsa, Oklahoma.

The Tulsa Golden Hurricane defeated the ninth ranked Bradley Braves, 74-58, in the championship game and as a result won their 3rd MVC Tournament title to earn an automatic bid to the 1986 NCAA tournament.

== Bracket ==
Quarterfinals; March 4, 1986
1	No. 9 Bradley	61
8	West Texas State	55
4	Illinois State	78
5	Wichita State	70
2	Tulsa	68
7	Indiana State	50
3	Drake	82
6	Creighton	56

Semifinals; March 5, 1986
1	No. 9 Bradley	65
4	Illinois State	64
2	Tulsa	68
3	Drake	67

Final; March 6, 1986
1	No. 9 Bradley	58
2	Tulsa	74
