= 1985–86 Illinois State Redbirds men's basketball team =

American college basketball season

1985–86 Illinois State Redbirds men's basketball
- Conference: Missouri Valley Conference
- Record: 15–14 (9–7 MVC)
- Head coach: Bob Donewald (8th season)
- Assistant coaches: Pat Cunningham; Anthony Jones; Duffy Burns; Ron Hecklinski; Mark Zwart
- Home arena: Horton Field House

1985–86 Missouri Valley Conference men's basketball standings
| | Conf. | | | | Overall |
| Team | W | | L | PCT | W | | L | PCT |
|---|---|---|---|---|---|---|---|---|
| No. 14 Bradley | 16 | – | 0 | 1.000 | 32 | – | 3 | .914 |
| Tulsa † | 10 | – | 6 | .625 | 23 | – | 9 | .719 |
| Drake | 10 | – | 6 | .625 | 19 | – | 11 | .633 |
| Illinois State | 9 | – | 7 | .563 | 15 | – | 14 | .517 |
| Wichita State | 7 | – | 9 | .438 | 14 | – | 14 | .500 |
| Creighton | 7 | – | 9 | .438 | 12 | – | 16 | .429 |
| Indiana State | 7 | – | 9 | .438 | 11 | – | 17 | .393 |
| West Texas State | 4 | – | 12 | .250 | 11 | – | 17 | .393 |
| Southern Illinois | 4 | – | 12 | .250 | 8 | – | 20 | .286 |
† 1986 MVC tournament winner Rankings from AP Poll

The 1985–86 Illinois State Redbirds men's basketball team represented Illinois State University during the 1985–86 NCAA Division I men's basketball season. The Redbirds, led by eighth year head coach Bob Donewald, played their home games at Horton Field House and competed as a member of the Missouri Valley Conference.

They finished the season 15–14, 9–7 in conference play to finish in fourth place. They were the number four seed for the Missouri Valley Conference tournament. They made it to the semifinal game before losing to ninth ranked Bradley University.

== Roster ==
1985–86 Illinois State Redbirds men's basketball team
Players
Coaches

| Pos. | # | Name | Height | Weight | Year | Hometown |
|---|---|---|---|---|---|---|
| G | 25 | William Anderson | 5 ft 11 in (1.8 m) | — | Sr | Indianapolis, IN |
| C | 54 | Bill Braksick | 7 ft 0 in (2.13 m) | — | Jr | Flanagan, IL |
| F | 35 | Derrick Sanders | 6 ft 6 in (1.98 m) | — | Jr | Chicago, IL |
| G | 23 | Jeff Harris | 6 ft 4 in (1.93 m) | — | So | Indianapolis, IN |
| F | 45 | Tony Holifield | 6 ft 7 in (2.01 m) | — | So | Oak Park, MI |
| F | 32 | Cliff Peterson | 6 ft 8 in (2.03 m) | — | So | Detroit, MI |
| G | 34 | Matt Taphorn | 6 ft 5 in (1.96 m) | — | So | Pekin, IL |
| F | 42 | Kevin DeCraene (redshirt) | 6 ft 8 in (2.03 m) | — | Fr | Granger, IN |
| G | 10 | Mark Kraatz | 6 ft 1 in (1.85 m) | — | Fr | Allen Park, MI |
| G | 24 | Sean Morros | 5 ft 10 in (1.78 m) | — | Fr | Ridgefield, CT |
| F | 53 | Jon Pemberton | 6 ft 9 in (2.06 m) | — | Fr | Bloomingdale, IL |
| G | 33 | Todd Starks | 6 ft 3 in (1.91 m) | — | Fr | Fort Wayne, IN |

Head coach

- Bob Donewald (Hanover)

Assistant coach(es)

- Pat Cunningham (Kalamazoo)
- Anthony Jones (Illinois State)
- Duffy Burns (Ball State)
- Ron Hecklinski (Manchester (IN))
- Mark Zwart (Illinois State)

Legend

- (C) Team captain
- (S) Suspended
- (I) Ineligible
- (W) Walk-on
- Injured
- Current redshirt

== Schedule ==
| Date time, TV | Rank^{#} | Opponent^{#} | Result | Record | High points | High rebounds | High assists | Site (attendance) city, state |
Exhibition Season
| November 18, 1985*; 7:30 pm | | Ponte Preta (Brazil) | W 67–50 | | 16 – Anderson | 8 – Sanders | – | Horton Field House; Normal, IL |
Regular Season
| November 23, 1985*; 7:30 pm | | Southeast Missouri State | W 79–73 | 1–0 | 20 – Holifield | – | – | Horton Field House (6,667); Normal, IL |
| November 26, 1985*; 7:30 pm | | Iowa State | L 52–55 | 1–1 | 11 – Braksick, Holifield | 8 – Sanders | – | Horton Field House (6,596); Normal, IL |
| November 30, 1985*; 2:30 pm | | Chicago State | L 57–67 | 1–2 | – | – | – | Horton Field House (5,276); Normal, IL |
| December 2, 1985*; 7:30 pm | | Wisconsin–Green Bay | W 58–39 | 2–2 | 18 – Braksick | 10 – Braksick | – | Horton Field House (5,896); Normal, IL |
| December 7, 1985*; 8:00 pm, WGN | | at DePaul | L 64–71 | 2–3 | 21 – Sanders | – | – | Rosemont Horizon (14,337); Rosemont, IL |
| December 13, 1985* | | vs. McNeese State; Dallas Morning News Classic [Semifinal] | W 60–52 | 3–3 | – | – | – | Moody Coliseum (3,978); University Park, TX |
| December 14, 1985*; 9:00 pm | | at Southern Methodist; Dallas Morning News Classic [Final] | L 58–68 | 3–4 | – | – | – | Moody Coliseum (4,368); University Park, TX |
| December 21, 1985*; 2:30 pm | | at Southwest Missouri State | L 60–76 | 3–5 | – | – | – | John Q. Hammons Student Center (6,512); Springfield, MO |
| December 27, 1985* | | vs. San Francisco; Cowboy Shootout [Semifinal] | W 68–52 | 4–5 | – | – | – | Arena-Auditorium (4,129); Laramie, WY |
| December 28, 1985*; 9:00 pm | | at Wyom‌ing; Cowboy Shootout [Final] | L 49–71 | 4–6 | – | – | – | Arena-Auditorium (4,341); Laramie, WY |
| January 4, 1986; 2:30 pm | | Drake | W 65–61 ^{OT} | 5–6 (1–0) | – | – | – | Horton Field House (5,253); Normal, IL |
| January 6, 1986; 7:30 pm | | at Indiana State | L 54–58 | 5–7 (1–1) | – | – | – | Hulman Center (4,246); Terre Haute, IN |
| January 11, 1986; 7:30 pm | | Wichita State | W 59–58 | 6–7 (2–1) | 16 – Sanders | 7 – Braksick | 9 – Kraatz | Henry Levitt Arena (9,465); Wichita, KS |
| January 13, 1986; 7:30 pm | | at Creighton | W 35–34 | 7–7 (3–1) | 23 – Sanders | 13 – Sanders | 3 – Anderson, Starks | Omaha Civic Auditorium (4,119); Omaha, NE |
| January 18, 1986; 2:30 pm | | West Texas State | W 42–32 | 8–7 (4–1) | – | – | – | Horton Field House (6,368); Normal, IL |
| January 20, 1986*; 7:30 pm | | Illinois–Chicago | W 73–68 | 9–7 | – | – | – | Horton Field House (6,326); Normal, IL |
| January 23, 1986; 7:30 pm, WEEK | | at No. 17 Bradley | L 63–67 ^{OT} | 9–8 (4–2) | – | – | – | Carver Arena (10,450); Peoria, IL |
| January 25, 1986; 12:00 pm, SPN | | Indiana State | W 77–73 | 10–8 (5–2) | – | – | – | Horton Field House (6,623); Normal, IL |
| January 30, 1986; 7:30 pm | | Tulsa | L 54–61 | 10–9 (5–3) | – | – | – | Horton Field House (6,527); Normal, IL |
| February 1, 1986; 7:30 pm | | at Drake | L 66–76 | 10–10 (5–4) | – | – | – | Veterans Memorial Auditorium (8,825); Des Monies, IA |
| February 6, 1986; 7:30 pm | | Southern Illinois | W 77–53 | 11–10 (6–4) | – | – | – | Horton Field House (6,546); Normal, IL |
| February 10, 1986; 9:00 pm, WHOI/ESPN | | No. 13 Bradley | L 67–74 | 11–11 (6–5) | – | – | – | Horton Field House (7,745); Normal, IL |
| February 13, 1986; 7:30 pm | | at West Texas State | W 66–61 | 12–11 (7–5) | – | – | – | WTSU Fiedhouse (2,010); Canyon, TX |
| February 15, 1986; 12:00 pm, SPN | | at Tulsa | L 54–69 | 12–12 (7–6) | – | – | – | Tulsa Convention Center (6,753); Tulsa, OK |
| February 20, 1986; 7:30 pm | | Wichita State | L 49–53 | 12–13 (7–7) | 10 – Anderson, Sanders, Holifield | 11 – Sanders | 4 – Anderson, Kraatz | Horton Field House (7,004); Normal, IL |
| February 22, 1986; 2:30 pm | | Creighton | W 63–53 | 13–13 (8–7) | 18 – Sanders | 10 – Braksick, Sanders | 5 – Harris | Horton Field House (7,721); Normal, IL |
| February 27, 1986; 7:30 pm | | at Southern Illinois | W 80–69 | 14–13 (9–7) | – | – | – | SIU Arena (4,240); Carbondale, IL |
Missouri Valley Conference {MVC} tournament
| March 3, 1986* | (4) | vs. (5) Wichita State; Quarterfinal | W 78–70 | 15–13 | 30 – Anderson | 6 – Braksick, Sanders | 3 – Anderson | Tulsa Convention Center (5,138); Tulsa, OK |
| March 4, 1986* | (4) | vs. (1) No. 9 Bradley; Semifinal | L 64–65 | 15–14 | 12 – Sanders, Taphorn | 15 – Sanders | 6 – Taphorn | Tulsa Convention Center (5,469); Tulsa, OK |
*Non-conference game. ^{#}Rankings from AP Poll. (#) Tournament seedings in parentheses. All times are in Central Standard Time.
