= Mike Williams (basketball) =

American retired basketball player (born 1963)

Personal information
- Born: August 14, 1963 (age 63) Chicago, Illinois, U.S.
- Listed height: 6 ft 8 in (2.03 m)
- Listed weight: 255 lb (116 kg)

Career information
- High school: De La Salle (Chicago, Illinois)
- College: Cincinnati (1981–1983); Bradley (1984–1986)
- NBA draft: 1986: 3rd round, 51st overall pick
- Drafted by: Golden State Warriors
- Playing career: 1986–1996
- Position: Power forward / small forward
- Number: 25

Career history
- 1986–1988: Júver Murcia
- 1988–1989: La Crosse Catbirds
- 1989–1990: Sacramento Kings
- 1990: Atlanta Hawks
- 1990: Caixa Ourense
- 1990–1991: La Crosse Catbirds
- 1991: Fort Wayne Fury
- 1991–1992: Sioux Falls Skyforce
- 1993–1994: La Crosse Catbirds
- 1994–1996: Sioux Falls Skyforce

Career highlights
- CBA champion (1990); Second-team All-MVC (1986)
- Stats at NBA.com
- Stats at Basketball Reference
Medals
Men's basketball
Representing United States
Pan American Games
Silver medal – second place	1995 Mar del Plata	National team

Michael George Williams (born August 14, 1963) is an American former basketball player. Born in Chicago, he attended De La Salle Institute where he led the Meteors to three straight Catholic League titles and went to the state tournament's Elite Eight twice. He was a 6'8" 255 lb power forward and attended the University of Cincinnati and Bradley University. In two seasons at Bradley from 1984 to 1986, Williams averaged 13.0 points and 6.8 rebounds per game.

Williams, originally selected by the Golden State Warriors with the 4th pick in the third round of the 1986 NBA draft, played for the NBA's Sacramento Kings and Atlanta Hawks during the 1989–1990 season, averaging 0.7 points and 1.1 rebounds per game.

Williams won a Continental Basketball Association (CBA) championship with the La Crosse Catbirds in 1990.

On November 29, 2009, Williams was shot and paralyzed while working at an Atlanta nightclub.

== Career statistics ==
Legend
GP	Games played	GS	Games started	MPG	Minutes per game
FG%	Field goal percentage	3P%	3-point field goal percentage	FT%	Free throw percentage
RPG	Rebounds per game	APG	Assists per game	SPG	Steals per game
BPG	Blocks per game	PPG	Points per game	**Bold**	Career high

=== NBA ===
==== Regular season ====
Year	Team	GP	GS	MPG	FG%	3P%	FT%	RPG	APG	SPG	BPG	PPG
1989–90	Sacramento	**16**	0	**5.5**	**.429**	.000	**.500**	**1.4**	**.1**	**.2**	**.4**	**.9**
1989–90	Atlanta	5	0	2.8	.000	–	–	.2	.0	.0	.0	.0
Career		21	0	4.9	.333	.000	.500	1.1	.1	.1	.3	.7
