= Moe Iba =

American former basketball coach (born 1939)

Biographical details
- Born: May 31, 1939 (age 87)

Playing career
- 1958–1962: Oklahoma State
- Position: Guard

Coaching career (HC unless noted)
- 1962–1966: Texas Western (assistant)
- 1966–1970: Memphis State
- 1970–1980: Nebraska (assistant)
- 1980–1986: Nebraska
- 1986–1987: Drake (assistant)
- 1987–1994: TCU

Head coaching record
- Overall: 239–244
- Tournaments: 0–1 (NCAA Division I); 6–5 (NIT)

Henry W. "Moe" Iba (born May 31, 1939) is an American former basketball coach. He served as the head men's basketball coach at Memphis State University, now known as the University of Memphis, from 1966 to 1970, Nebraska from 1980 to 1986, and Texas Christian University (TCU) from 1987 to 1994, compiling a career college basketball coach record of 239–244. Iba graduated from Oklahoma State University in 1962. He played basketball there under his father, Henry Iba, the Hall of Fame coach who developed the motion offense.

== Coaching career ==
=== Texas Western ===
After college, Iba got his first job as the freshman assistant coach at Texas Western College of the University of Texas, now known as University of Texas at El Paso (UTEP), under Don Haskins. He was at Texas Western during the 1965–66 basketball season when Texas Western won the 1966 NCAA University Division basketball tournament. This achievement was depicted in the film Glory Road and Iba was portrayed on screen by Evan Jones.

=== Memphis ===
After the 1966 season, Iba was hired as head coach at Memphis State University, now known as the University of Memphis, replacing Dean Ehlers. He recruited Larry Finch and Ronnie Robinson, two local Memphis legends, to come to Memphis State. Iba was, however, let go after a 6–20 season in 1969–70 and never got to coach them on a collegiate level, but left his mark on the program when Gene Bartow took those recruits and went to the NCAA championship game in 1973.

=== Nebraska ===
After leaving Memphis State, Moe got a position as an assistant coach at the University of Nebraska–Lincoln. He was named acting head coach when Joe Cipriano became ill with cancer. He replaced Cipriano in 1980 and was head coach at Nebraska until 1986. Iba's teams there played in three National Invitation Tournaments and made one NCAA Division I men's basketball tournament bid, the first NCAA appearance in the program's history.

=== TCU ===
Iba was an assistant at Drake University in 1986–87 and was then hired as the head coach at Texas Christian University (TCU), where he stayed until 1994.

== Head coaching record ==
Record table
| Season | Team | Overall | Conference | Standing | Postseason |
|---|---|---|---|---|---|
Memphis State Tigers (NCAA University Division independent) (1966–1967)
| 1966–67 | Memphis State | 17–9 | | | NIT first round |
Memphis State Tigers (Missouri Valley Conference) (1967–1970)
| 1967–68 | Memphis State | 8–17 | 2–14 | 9th | |
| 1968–69 | Memphis State | 6–19 | 0–16 | 9th | |
| 1969–70 | Memphis State | 6–20 | 1–15 | 9th | |
| Memphis State: | | 37–65 (.363) | 3–45 (.063) | | |
Nebraska Cornhuskers (Big Eight Conference) (1980–1986)
| 1980–81 | Nebraska | 15–12 | 9–5 | T–2nd | |
| 1981–82 | Nebraska | 16–12 | 7–7 | T–4th | |
| 1982–83 | Nebraska | 22–10 | 9–5 | T–3rd | NIT semifinal |
| 1983–84 | Nebraska | 18–12 | 7–7 | 3rd | NIT second round |
| 1984–85 | Nebraska | 16–14 | 5–9 | T–5th | NIT second round |
| 1985–86 | Nebraska | 19–11 | 8–6 | T–3rd | NCAA Division I first round |
| Nebraska: | | 106–71 (.599) | 45–39 (.536) | | |
TCU Horned Frogs (Southwest Conference) (1987–1994)
| 1987–88 | TCU | 9–19 | 3–13 | T–8th | |
| 1988–89 | TCU | 17–13 | 9–7 | 3rd | |
| 1989–90 | TCU | 16–13 | 9–7 | 4th | |
| 1990–91 | TCU | 18–10 | 9–7 | T–4th | |
| 1991–92 | TCU | 23–11 | 9–5 | 3rd | NIT second round |
| 1992–93 | TCU | 6–22 | 2–12 | 8th | |
| 1993–94 | TCU | 7–20 | 3–11 | T–7th | |
| TCU: | | 96–108 (.471) | 44–62 (.415) | | |
| Total: | | 239–244 (.495) | | | |
