= Grant, Nebraska =

- City
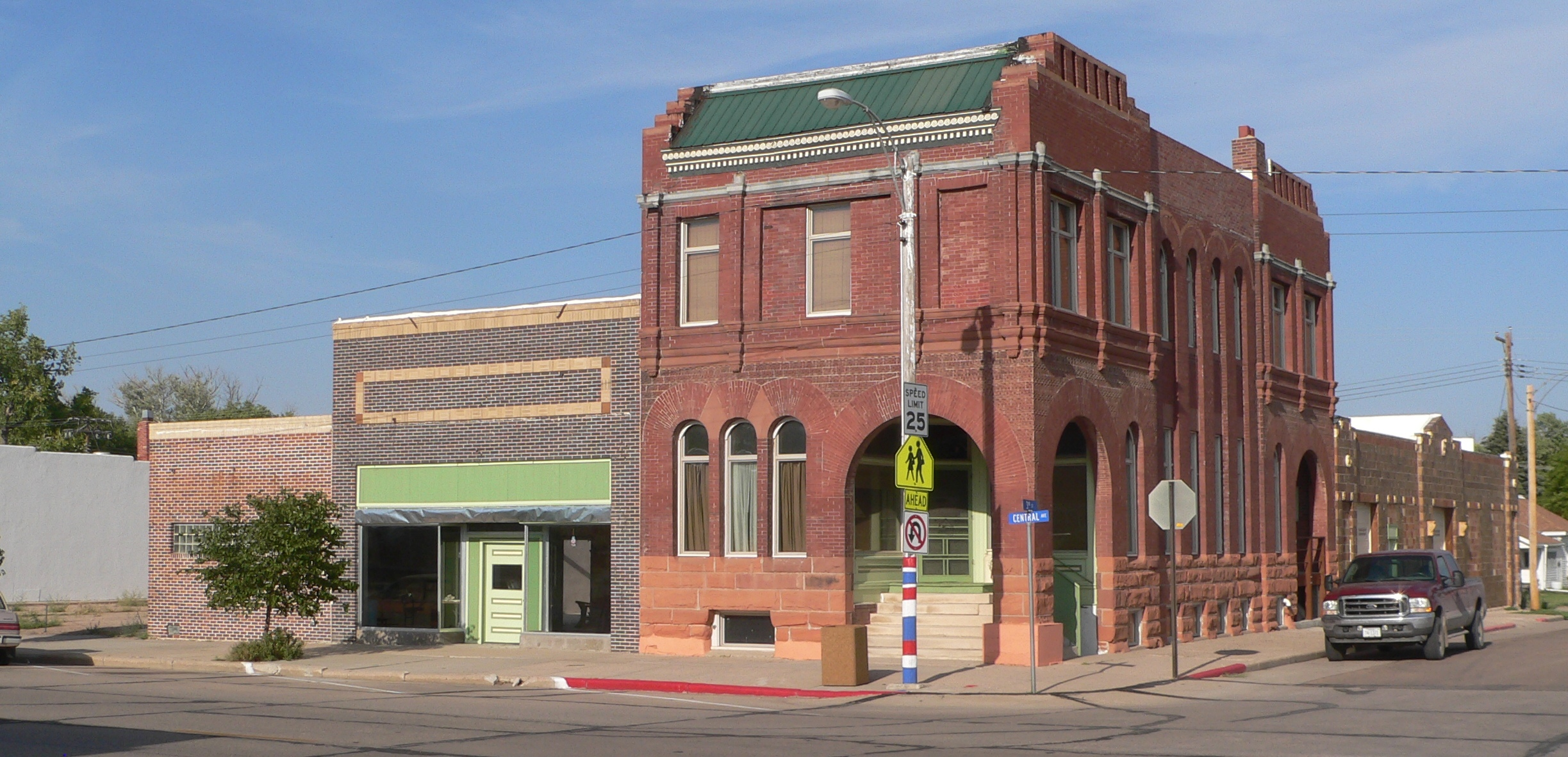
- The Grant Commercial Historic District is listed in the National Register of Historic Places.

- Location within Perkins County and Nebraska
- Coordinates: 40°50′41″N 101°43′32″W
- Country: United States
- State: Nebraska
- County: Perkins

Area
  - Total: 0.79 sq mi (2.04 km^{2})
  - Land: 0.79 sq mi (2.04 km^{2})
  - Water: 0 sq mi (0.00 km^{2})
- Elevation: 3,416 ft (1,041 m)

Population (2020)
  - Total: 1,197
  - Density: 1,519.3/sq mi (586.62/km^{2})
- Time zone: UTC-7 (Mountain (MST))
  - Summer (DST): UTC-6 (MDT)
- ZIP code: 69140
- Area code: 308
- FIPS code: 31-19910
- GNIS feature ID: 2394965
- Website: www.grantnebraska.com

Grant is a city in and the county seat of Perkins County, Nebraska, United States. As of the 2020 census, Grant had a population of 1,197.

== History ==
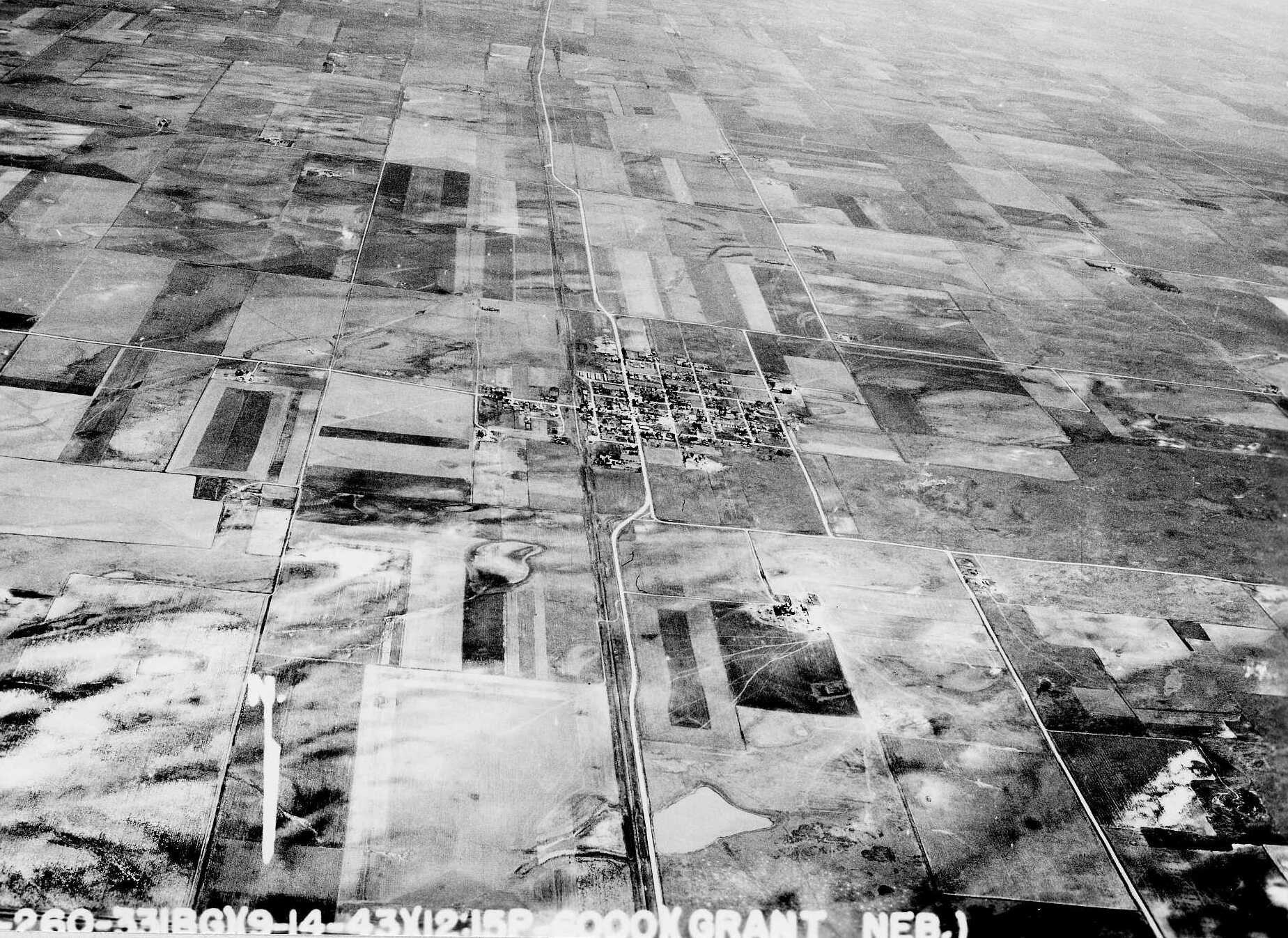
Aerial view of Grant, 1925

Grant was platted in 1886 when the Chicago, Burlington and Quincy Railroad was extended to that point. The city is named for Ulysses S. Grant, 18th President of the United States.

== Geography ==
According to the United States Census Bureau, the city has a total area of 0.73 square miles (1.89 km^{2}), all land.

== Demographics ==
Historical population
Census	Pop.	Note	%±
1890	315		—
1900	162		−48.6%
1910	358		121.0%
1920	585		63.4%
1930	798		36.4%
1940	897		12.4%
1950	1,091		21.6%
1960	1,166		6.9%
1970	1,099		−5.7%
1980	1,270		15.6%
1990	1,239		−2.4%
2000	1,225		−1.1%
2010	1,165		−4.9%
2020	1,197		2.7%
U.S. Decennial Census

=== 2010 census ===
As of the census of 2010, there were 1,165 people, 520 households, and 317 families living in the city. The population density was 1,595.9 inhabitants per square mile (616.2/km^{2}). There were 588 housing units at an average density of 805.5 units per square mile (311.0 units/km^{2}). The racial makeup of the city was 97.7% White, 0.1% African American, 0.4% Native American, 0.4% Asian, 1.0% from other races, and 0.3% from two or more races. Hispanic or Latino of any race were 2.7% of the population.

There were 520 households, of which 26.2% had children under the age of 18 living with them, 53.5% were married couples living together, 4.8% had a female householder with no husband present, 2.7% had a male householder with no wife present, and 39.0% were non-families. 36.5% of all households were made up of individuals, and 21.2% had someone living alone who was 65 years of age or older. The average household size was 2.16 and the average family size was 2.79.

The median age in the city was 46.4 years. 23.3% of residents were under the age of 18; 5.6% were between the ages of 18 and 24; 19.9% were from 25 to 44; 26.4% were from 45 to 64; and 24.8% were 65 years of age or older. The gender makeup of the city was 47.6% male and 52.4% female.

=== 2000 census ===
As of the census of 2000, there were 1,225 people, 535 households, and 331 families living in the city. The population density was 1,674.6 inhabitants per square mile (646.6/km^{2}). There were 591 housing units at an average density of 807.9 units per square mile (311.9 units/km^{2}). The racial makeup of the city was 98.78% White, 0.33% Native American, 0.16% Asian, 0.24% from other races, and 0.49% from two or more races. Hispanic or Latino of any race were 1.22% of the population.

There were 535 households, out of which 28.4% had children under the age of 18 living with them, 54.6% were married couples living together, 5.8% had a female householder with no husband present, and 38.1% were non-families. 36.8% of all households were made up of individuals, and 25.8% had someone living alone who was 65 years of age or older. The average household size was 2.19 and the average family size was 2.86.

In the city, the population was spread out, with 23.4% under the age of 18, 4.4% from 18 to 24, 21.6% from 25 to 44, 22.8% from 45 to 64, and 27.8% who were 65 years of age or older. The median age was 45 years. For every 100 females, there were 86.5 males. For every 100 females age 18 and over, there were 80.7 males.

As of 2000 the median income for a household in the city was $31,625, and the median income for a family was $42,692. Males had a median income of $30,050 versus $20,673 for females. The per capita income for the city was $18,909. About 6.1% of families and 8.9% of the population were below the poverty line, including 12.2% of those under age 18 and 9.8% of those age 65 or over.

== Notable people ==
- Danielle Ate the Sandwich (born 1986), singer-songwriter
- Frank Anderson (born 1959), baseball coach
- Hugh Davidson (1928–2020), American football player
- Gary Glick (1930–2015), American football player
- Dan Hughes (born 1956), politician
- Bill Jackman (born 1963), college basketball player
