= Omaha Benson High School Magnet =

Benson High School Magnet

Location
- 5120 Maple Street; Omaha, Nebraska; United States; 41°17′09″N 95°59′38″W

Information
- Type: Public magnet high school
- Established: 1904
- School district: Omaha Public Schools
- Staff: 76.60 (FTE)
- Grades: 9–12
- Enrollment: 1,570 (2022–2023)
- Student to teacher ratio: 20.50
- Colors: Green and white
- Mascot: Bunny
- Newspaper: Benson High Gazette / Benson High News
- Website: Benson H.S.

Omaha Benson High School Magnet, Benson High Magnet, or Benson High, is a public high school in Omaha, Nebraska, United States, in the Benson neighborhood. The original site of Benson High was the current building that houses Benson West Elementary School. Founded in 1904, Benson High is one of the oldest high schools in the state. Its enrollment is approximately 1,500 students. As of 2024, the principal was Melinda Bailey. The school mascot is the Bunny.

== Athletics ==
=== State championships ===
State championships
Season	Sport	Number of championships	Year
Fall	Cross Country, boys'	2	2001, 2007
Winter	Basketball, boys'	2	1920, 1992
Winter	Basketball, girls'	1	2014
Spring	Baseball	1	1974
Spring	Golf, boys'	1	1939
Total		7	

== "The N-Word" controversy ==
In April 2007, the student newspaper published a four-page special feature entitled "The N-Word" examining the use of the racial epithet "nigger" within the school community. It included factual reporting, editorial content, and a transcript of a round-table discussion on the topic in one of the school's ethics classes.

Community response was mixed. Many students and parents, and the school's principal, were supportive of the newspaper's coverage, but the school district received many phone calls expressing concern or offense at the content. The school district, Omaha Public Schools, put the principal on temporary administrative leave and denounced the publication. The principal was later reinstated.

== Notable alumni ==
- Tom Becka, talk radio personality
- Jackie Brandt, MLB player and 1961 American League All-Star
- Walter Holden Capps, U.S. Representative from California
- Hal Daub, U.S. Representative from Nebraska
- Terry Goodkind, fantasy author
- Dave Hoppen (born 1964), NBA player
- Jason Jolkowski, missing person since June 2001
- Floyd Kalber, television journalist
- David Karnes, U.S. Senator from Nebraska, 1987 through 1989
- Kenton Keith, professional football player
- Nile Kinnick, football player and 1939 Heisman Trophy winner
- Nick Nolte (born 1941), film actor
- Robert Reed, science fiction author
- Amber Ruffin, writer, Late Night With Seth Meyers, The Detroiters (Comedy Central), The Amber Ruffin Show
- Khyri Thomas (born 1996), American basketball player for Maccabi Tel Aviv of the Israeli Basketball Premier League and the EuroLeague, former NBA player
- Tony Veland, NFL safety
- Andre Woolridge, professional basketball player, All American at the University of Iowa

== See also ==
- Omaha Public Schools
