= Bill Jackman (basketball) =

American college basketball player (born 1963)

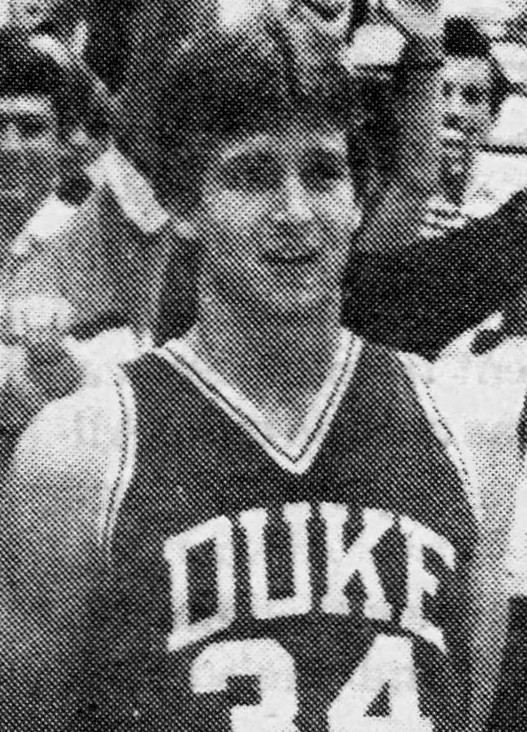
- Jackman in 1982

Personal information
- Born: October 13, 1963 (age 62) Grant, Nebraska, U.S.
- Listed height: 6 ft 8 in (2.03 m)
- Listed weight: 210 lb (95 kg)

Career information
- High school: Perkins County (Grant, Nebraska)
- College: Duke (1982–1983); Nebraska (1984–1987)
- NBA draft: 1987: undrafted
- Position: Small forward

Bill Jackman (born October 13, 1963) is an American former college and international basketball player.

== Early life and high school career ==
Jackman was born in Grant, Nebraska, on October 13, 1963, one of five children of Peggy and Herb Jackman. Standing at 6 ft 8 in (2.03 m) (disputed with 6 ft 9 in (2.06 m)), he was a football and basketball player for Perkins County High School, helping his basketball team win 52 games in a row. Over his high school career, he scored 1,768 points—749 coming from one season.

== College and international career ==
After graduating high school in 1982, Jackman was signed by Mike Krzyzewski to play basketball for Duke University. He averaged 8.4 points and 5.4 rebounds in his freshman year, afterwards returning to Nebraska to play for University of Nebraska–Lincoln's team for the rest of his college career. He scored 500 points in his career there. Jackman was encouraged to leave the state of Nebraska after graduating by Danny Nee, and he did so and moved to Austin, Texas, where he played casually with about 20 NBA-signed players and practiced more, eventually spending a summer with the Houston Rockets, though went unsigned.

Afterward, Jackman played with eighteen international teams within four years, including for ones in Colombia, Mexico, New Zealand and Venezuela.

== Post-basketball life ==
After playing internationally, Jackson attended the University of Chicago alongside two of his brothers, and graduated with a Master of Business Administration. A businessman in Dallas, he is a director of the Cotton Bowl Classic and the University of Nebraska Foundation.
