= 1985–86 Big East Conference men's basketball season =

American college basketball season

1985–86 Big East Conference Men's Basketball Season
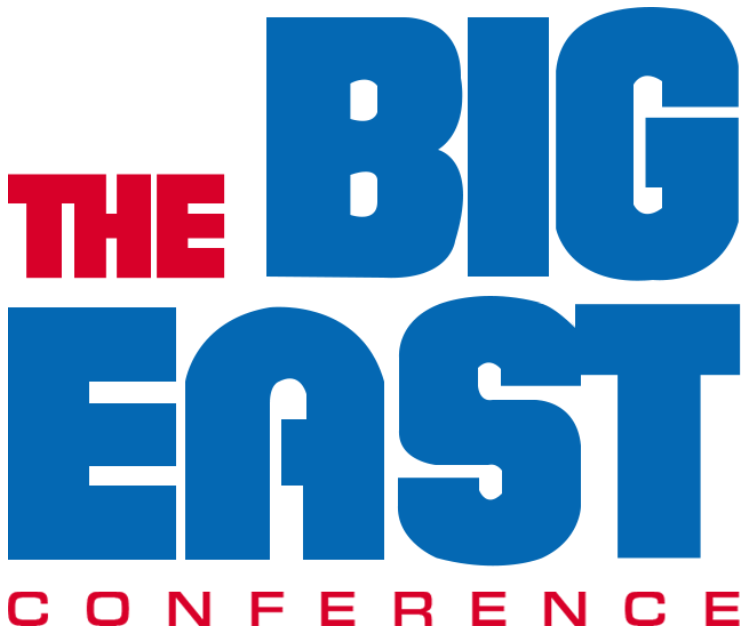
- League: NCAA Division I
- Sport: Basketball
- Duration: November 22, 1985 through March 8, 1986
- Teams: 9
- TV partner: ESPN

Regular Season
- Champion: St. John's and Syracuse (14–2)
- Season MVP: Walter Berry – St. John's

Tournament
- Champions: St. John's
- Finals MVP: Pearl Washington – Syracuse

Basketball seasons
- 1984–85 1986–87

1985–86 Big East men's basketball standings
	Conf.				Overall
Team	W		L	PCT	W		L	PCT
No. 4 St. John's †	14	–	2	.875	31	–	5	.861
No. 9 Syracuse	14	–	2	.875	26	–	6	.813
No. 13 Georgetown	11	–	5	.688	24	–	8	.750
Villanova	10	–	6	.625	23	–	14	.622
Providence	7	–	9	.438	17	–	14	.548
Pittsburgh	6	–	10	.375	15	–	14	.517
Boston College	4	–	12	.250	13	–	15	.464
Connecticut	3	–	13	.188	12	–	16	.429
Seton Hall	3	–	13	.188	14	–	18	.438
† 1986 Big East tournament winner As of March 31, 1986; Rankings from AP Poll

The 1985–86 Big East Conference men's basketball season was the seventh in conference history, and involved its nine full-time member schools.

St. John's and Syracuse were the regular-season co-champions with identical records of (14–2). St. John's won the Big East tournament championship.

== Season summary & highlights ==
- St. John's and Syracuse were the regular-season co-champions with identical records of (14–2). It was the fourth regular-season championship or co-championship for St. John's and the second for Syracuse.
- St. John's won its second Big East tournament championship.

== Head coaches ==
School	Coach	Season	Notes
Boston College	Gary Williams	4th	Resigned March 15, 1986
Connecticut	Dom Perno	9th	Resigned April 14, 1986
Georgetown	John Thompson, Jr.	14th	
Pittsburgh	Roy Chipman	6th	Resigned March 12, 1986
Providence	Rick Pitino	1st	
St. John's	Lou Carnesecca	18th	Big East Coach of the Year (3rd award)
Seton Hall	P. J. Carlesimo	4th	
Syracuse	Jim Boeheim	10th	
Villanova	Rollie Massimino	13th	

== Rankings ==
Georgetown and Syracuse were ranked in the Top 20 of the Associated Press poll for the entire season, and St.John's was in the Top 20 in every week except for the preseason poll.

1985–86 Big East Conference Weekly Rankings Key: ██ Increase in ranking. ██ Decrease in ranking.
AP Poll	Pre	11/25	12/2	12/9	12/16	12/23	12/30	1/6	1/13	1/20	1/27	2/3	2/10	2/17	2/24	3/3	Final
Boston College																	
Connecticut																	
Georgetown	8	8	6	5	5	5	11	13	15	12	12	11	9	13	15	14	13
Pittsburgh																	
Providence																	
St. John's		18	15	14	11	11	10	10	9	8	7	10	7	6	8	5	4
Seton Hall																	
Syracuse	4	4	4	4	4	4	4	4	4	9	11	8	12	9	6	8	9
Villanova																	

== Regular-season statistical leaders ==
Scoring
Name	School	PPG
Walter Berry	SJU	23.0
Earl Kelley	Conn	18.6
Roger McCready	BC	18.1
Reggie Williams	GU	17.6
Pearl Washington	Syr	17.3

Rebounding
Name	School	RPG
Walter Berry	SJU	11.1
Harold Pressley	Vill	10.1
Tim Coles	Conn	9.3
Reggie Williams	GU	8.2
Charles Smith	Pitt	8.1

Assists
Name	School	APG
Mark Jackson	SJU	8.1
Pearl Washington	Syr	7.8
Earl Kelley	Conn	6.4
Michael Jackson	GU	6.2
Gerald Greene	SHU	5.2

Steals
Name	School	SPG
Harold Starks	Prov	3.2
Pearl Washington	Syr	2.6
Harold Pressley	Vill	2.2
Dana Barros	BC	2.0
Dominic Pressley	BC	1.9

Blocks
Name	School	BPG
Rony Seikaly	Syr	3.0
Charles Smith	Pitt	2.8
Harold Pressley	Vill	2.2
Walter Berry	Vill	2.1
Steve Wright	Prov	2.0

Field Goals
Name	School	FG%
Walter Berry	SJU	.598
Curtis Aiken	Pitt	.569
Demetreus Gore	Pitt	.555
Wendell Alexis	Syr	.542
Pearl Washington	Syr	.535

Free Throws
Name	School	FT%
Earl Kelley	Conn	.870
Al Roth	Prov	.847
Wendell Alexis	Syr	.810
Billy Donovan	Prov	.792
Andre McCloud	SHU	.774

== Postseason ==
=== Big East tournament ===
==== Seeding ====
Seeding in the Big East tournament was based on conference record, with tiebreakers applied as necessary. The eighth- and ninth-seeded teams played a first-round game, and the other seven teams received a bye into the quarterfinals.

The tournament's seeding was as follows: (1) St. John's, (2) Syracuse, (3) Georgetown, (4) Villanova, (5) Providence, (6) Pittsburgh, (7) Boston College, (8) Connecticut, (9) Seton Hall.

== Bracket ==
First round March 5, 1986
8	Connecticut	66
9	Seton Hall	76

Quarterfinals; March 6, 1986
1	#5 St. John's	87
9	Seton Hall	68
4	Villanova	75
5	Providence	68
3	#14 Georgetown	57
6	Pittsburgh	56
2	#8 Syracuse	102
7	Boston College	79

Semifinals; March 7, 1986
1	#5 St. John's	75
4	Villanova	64
3	#14 Georgetown	73
2	#8 Syracuse	75^{OT}

Championship Game; March 8, 1986
1	#5 St. John's	70
2	#8 Syracuse	69

=== NCAA tournament ===
Four Big East teams received bids to the NCAA Tournament, with St. John's seeded No. 1 in the West Region. All four schools lost in the second round.

School	Region	Seed	Round 1	Round 2
St. John's	West	1	16 Montana State, W 83–74	8 Auburn, L 81–65
Syracuse	East	2	15 Brown, W 101–52	7 Navy, L 97–85
Georgetown	Midwest	4	13 Texas Tech,, W 70–64	5 Michigan State, L 80–68
Villanova	Southeast	10	7 Virginia Tech, W 71–62	2 Georgia Tech, L 66–61

=== National Invitation Tournament ===
Two Big East teams received bids to the National Invitation Tournament, which did not yet have seeding. Playing in separate unnamed brackets, Pittsburgh lost in the first round and Providence in the quarterfinals.

School	Round 1	Round 2	Quarterfinals
Providence	Boston University, W 72–69	George Mason, W 90–71	Louisiana Tech, L 64–63
Pittsburgh	Southwest Missouri State, L 59–52		

== Awards and honors ==
=== Big East Conference ===
Player of the Year:

- Walter Berry, St. John's, F, Jr.

Defensive Player of the Year:

- Harold Pressley, Villanova, F, Sr.

Freshman of the Year:

- Dana Barros, Boston College, G

Coach of the Year:

- Lou Carnesecca, St. John's (18th season)

All-Big East First Team

- Reggie Williams, Georgetown, G, Jr., 6 ft 7 in (201 cm), 190 lb (86 kg), Baltimore, Md.
- Mark Jackson, St. John's, F, Jr., 6 ft 6 in (198 cm), 205 lb (93 kg), Brooklyn, N.Y.
- Walter Berry, St. John's, F, Jr., 6 ft 8 in (203 cm), 215 lb (98 kg), New York, N.Y.
- Pearl Washington, Syracuse, G, Jr., 6 ft 2 in (188 cm), 190 lb (86 kg), Brooklyn, N.Y.
- Harold Pressley, Villanova, F, Sr., 6 ft 7 in (201 cm), 210 lb (95 kg), The Bronx, N.Y.

All-Big East Second Team:

- Earl Kelley, Connecticut, G, Sr., 6 ft 1 in (185 cm), 177 lb (80 kg), New Haven, Conn.
- David Wingate, Georgetown, G, Sr., 6 ft 5 in (196 cm), 185 lb (84 kg), Baltimore, Md.
- Rafael Addison, Syracuse, F, Sr., 6 ft 7 in (201 cm), 215 lb (98 kg), Jersey City, N.J.
- Rony Seikaly, Syracuse, C, So. 6 ft 10 in (208 cm), 240 lb (109 kg), Athens, Greece
- Wendell Alexis, Syracuse, F, Sr., 6 ft 7 in (201 cm), 215 lb (98 kg), Washington, D.C.

All-Big East Third Team:

- Roger McCready, Boston College, F, Sr., 6 ft 5 in (196 cm), 210 lb (95 kg), Brooklyn, N.Y.
- Michael Jackson, Georgetown, G, Sr., 6 ft 2 in (188 cm), 183 lb (83 kg), Fairfax, Va.
- Charles Smith, Pittsburgh, F, So., 6 ft 10 in (208 cm), 250 lb (113 kg), Bridgeport, Conn.
- Demetreus Gore, Pittsburgh, F, So. 6 ft 5 in (196 cm), 210 lb (95 kg), Detroit, Mich.
- Billy Donovan, Providence, G, Jr. 5 ft 11 in (180 cm), 171 lb (78 kg), Baltimore, Md.

Big East All-Freshman Team:

- Dana Barros, Boston College, G, 5 ft 11 in (180 cm), 163 lb (74 kg), Boston, Mass.
- Phil Gamble, Connecticut, G, 6 ft 4 in (193 cm), 175 lb (79 kg), Washington, D.C.
- Jonathan Edwards, Georgetown, F, 6 ft 9 in (206 cm), 240 lb (109 kg), New Orleans, La.
- Doug West, Villanova, G, 6 ft 6 in (198 cm), 200 lb (91 kg), Altoona, Pa.
- Kenny Wilson, Villanova, G, 5 ft 9 in (175 cm)

=== All-Americans ===
The following players were selected to the 1986 Associated Press All-America teams.

Consensus All-America First Team:

- Walter Berry, St. John's, Key Stats: 23.0 ppg, 11.1 rpg, 1.0 apg, 59.8 FG%, 828 points

First Team All-America:

- Walter Berry, St. John's, Key Stats: 23.0 ppg, 11.1 rpg, 1.0 apg, 59.8 FG%, 828 points

Third Team All-America:

- Pearl Washington, Syracuse, Key Stats: 17.3 ppg, 2.5 rpg, 7.8 apg, 53.5 FG%, 554 points

AP Honorable Mention

- Rafael Addison, Syracuse
- Wendell Alexis, Syracuse
- Mark Jackson, St. John's
- Michael Jackson, Georgetown
- Earl Kelley, Connecticut
- Andre McCloud, Seton Hall
- Roger McCready, Boston College
- Charles Smith, Pittsburgh
- Reggie Williams, Georgetown
- David Wingate, Georgetown

== See also ==
- 1985–86 NCAA Division I men's basketball season
- 1985–86 Connecticut Huskies men's basketball team
- 1985–86 Georgetown Hoyas men's basketball team
- 1985–86 Pittsburgh Panthers men's basketball team
- 1985–86 St. John's Redmen basketball team
- 1985–86 Syracuse Orangemen basketball team
- 1985–86 Villanova Wildcats men's basketball team
