= Brown Bears men's basketball statistical leaders =

Brown University sports stats

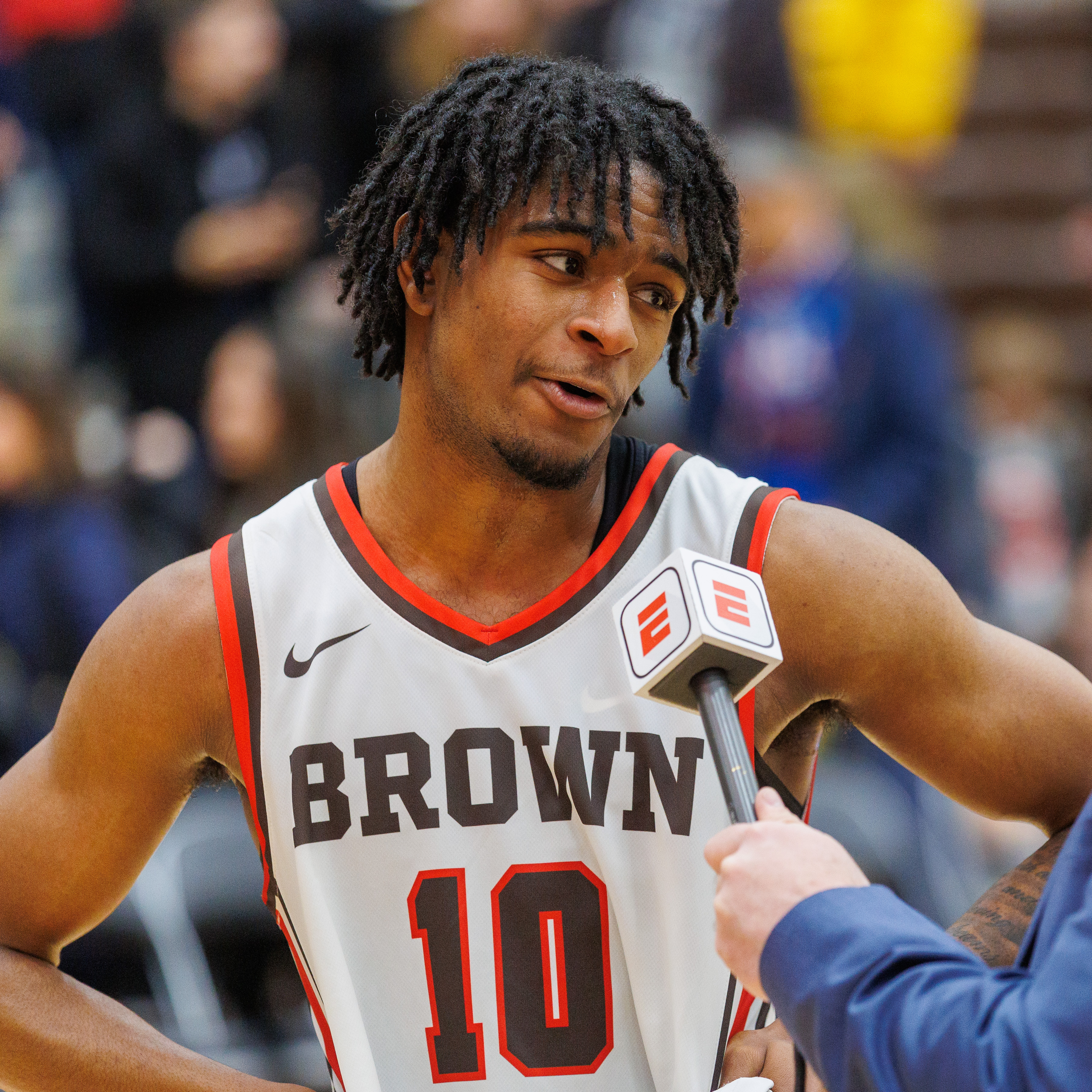
High scorer Kino Lilly Jr. in 2023

The Brown Bears men's basketball statistical leaders are individual statistical leaders of the Brown Bears men's basketball program in various categories, including points, rebounds, assists, steals, and blocks. Within those areas, the lists identify single-game, single-season, and career leaders. The Bears represent Brown University in the NCAA's Ivy League.

Brown began competing in intercollegiate basketball in 1900. However, the school's record book does not generally list records from before the 1950s, as records from before this period are often incomplete and inconsistent. Since scoring was much lower in this era, and teams played much fewer games during a typical season, it is likely that few or no players from this era would appear on these lists anyway.

The NCAA did not officially record assists as a stat until the 1983–84 season, and blocks and steals until the 1985–86 season, but Brown's record books includes players in these stats before these seasons. These lists are updated through the end of the 2023–24 season.

== Scoring ==
Career
Rk	Player	Points	Seasons
1	Earl Hunt	2,041	1999–00 2000–01 2001–02 2002–03
2	Kino Lilly Jr.	1,878	2021–22 2022–23 2023–24 2024–25
3	Arnie Berman	1,668	1969–70 1970–71 1971–72
4	Sean McGonagill	1,618	2010–11 2011–12 2012–13 2013–14
5	Jason Forte	1,597	2001–02 2002–03 2003–04 2004–05
6	Brandon Anderson	1,405	2016–17 2017–18 2018–19 2019–20
7	Steven Spieth	1,367	2013–14 2014–15 2015–16 2016–17
8	Peter Sullivan	1,361	2007–08 2008–09 2009–10 2010–11
9	Alai Nuualiitia	1,344	1999–00 2000–01 2001–02 2002–03
10	Mike Cingiser	1,331	1959–60 1960–61 1961–62

Season
Rk	Player	Points	Season
1	Arnie Berman	658	1971–72
2	Rusty Tyler	568	1970–71
3	Kino Lilly Jr.	564	2023–24
4	Joe Tebo	541	1955–56
	Arnie Berman	541	1970–71
6	Peter Moss	540	1979–80
7	Earl Hunt	533	2000–01
	Earl Hunt	533	2001–02
9	Brian Saunders	519	1976–77
	Jim Turner	519	1985–86

Single game
Rk	Player	Points	Season	Opponent
1	Harry Platt	48	1937–38	Northeastern
2	Rusty Tyler	46	1970–71	University of Rhode Island
3	Marcus Thompson	43	1988–89	Harvard
4	Patrick Lynch	42	1986–87	Dartmouth
5	Joe Tebo	41	1956–57	Cornell
6	Ed Tooley	39	1954–55	Amherst
	Brian Saunders	39	1976–77	Columbia
	Patrick Lynch	39	1986–87	Yale
	Earl Hunt	39	1999–00	Harvard
	Earl Hunt	39	2002–03	Central Connecticut
	Damon Huffman	39	2007–08	Ohio U.
	Sean McGonagill	39	2010–11	Columbia
	Kimo Ferrari	39	2023–24	Dartmouth

== Rebounds ==
Career
Rk	Player	Rebounds	Seasons
1	Phil Brown	931	1972–73 1973–74 1974–75
2	Ed Tooley	924	1952–53 1953–54 1954–55 1955–56
3	Cedric Kuakumensah	907	2012–13 2013–14 2014–1'5 2015–16
4	Arnie Berman	878	1969–70 1970–71 1971–72
5	Gerry Alaimo	870	1955–56 1956–57 1957–58
6	Tamenang Choh	856	2017–18 2018–19 2019–20 2021–22
7	Allan Poulsen	816	1956–57 1957–58 1958–59
8	Stark Langs	789	1981–82 1982–83 1983–84 1984–85
9	Alai Nuualiitia	710	1999–00 2000–01 2001–02 2002–03
10	Bill Arnold	690	1952–53 1953–54 1954–55

Season
Rk	Player	Rebounds	Season
1	Ed Tooley	436	1954–55
2	Ed Tooley	376	1953–54
3	Phil Brown	330	1972–73
4	Arnie Berman	324	1971–72
5	Allan Poulsen	318	1957–58
6	Phil Brown	309	1973–74
7	Gerry Alaimo	305	1957–58
8	Charles Merritt	303	1955–56
9	Gerry Alaimo	297	1956–57
10	Phil Brown	292	1974–75

Single game
Rk	Player	Rebounds	Season	Opponent
1	Ed Tooley	32	1954–55	Northeastern
2	Gerry Alaimo	26	1957–58	University of Rhode Island
3	Phil Brown	24	1974–75	Dartmouth
4	Allan Poulsen	23	1957–58	University of Rhode Island
5	Arnie Berman	22	1969–70	Harvard
	Allan Poulsen	22	1958–59	University of Rhode Island
7	Gerry Alaimo	21	1956–57	Pennsylvania
	Tamenang Choh	21	2021–22	Bryant

== Assists ==
Career
Rk	Player	Assists	Seasons
1	Mike Waitkus	577	1982–83 1983–84 1984–85 1985–86
2	Sean McGonagill	522	2010–11 2011–12 2012–13 2013–14
3	Jason Forte	514	2001–02 2002–03 2003–04 2004–05
4	Tavon Blackmon	465	2013–14 2014–15 2015–16 2016–17
5	Eric Blackiston	380	1992–93 1993–94 1994–95 1995–96
6	Rick Lloyd	379	1988–89 1989–90 1990–91 1991–92
7	Eddie Morris	362	1972–73 1973–74 1974–75
	Kino Lilly Jr.	362	2021–22 2022–23 2023–24 2024–25
9	Steven Spieth	337	2013–14 2014–15 2015–16 2016–17
10	Tamenang Choh	319	2017–18 2018–19 2019–20 2021–22

Season
Rk	Player	Assists	Season
1	Sean McGonagill	157	2011–12
2	Jason Forte	155	2002–03
3	Mike Waitkus	150	1983–84
4	Sean McGonagill	147	2010–11
5	Mike Waitkus	144	1985–86
	Tavon Blackmon	144	2015–16
7	Mike Waitkus	143	1984–85
8	Mike Waitkus	140	1982–83
	Jeremiah Jenkins	140	2025–26
10	Eddie Morris	133	1973–74

Single game
Rk	Player	Assists	Season	Opponent
1	Jim Burke	15	1971–72	Dartmouth
2	Mike Waitkus	13	1984–85	Harvard
	Ray Lambert	13	1977–78	Davidson
4	Eddie Morris	12	1973–74	Yale
	Mike Waitkus	12	1985–86	University of New Hampshire
	Chuck Savage	12	1990–91	Harvard
	Sean McGonagill	12	2013–14	Daniel Webster
8	Jim Cahill	11	1970–71	Dartmouth
	Mark Daly	11	1984–85	Dartmouth
	Mike Waitkus	11	1985–86	Penn
	Mike Waitkus	11	1985–86	Harvard
	Dom Taylor	11	1986–87	Miami of Ohio
	Chris Skrelja	11	2008–09	Army
	Sean McGonagill	11	2011–12	Central Connecticut
	Kino Lilly Jr.	11	2024–25	Cornell

== Steals ==
Career
Rk	Player	Steals	Seasons
1	Jason Forte	192	2001–02 2002–03 2003–04 2004–05
2	Mike Waitkus	187	1982–83 1983–84 1984–85 1985–86
3	Alex Bynum	175	1980–81 1981–82 1982–83 1983–84
4	Marcus Becker	152	2003–04 2004–05 2005–06 2006–07
	Brandon Anderson	152	2016–17 2017–18 2018–19 2019–20
6	Steven Spieth	136	2013–14 2014–15 2015–16 2016–17
7	Luke Ruscoe	132	2002–03 2003–04 2004–05 2005–06
	Sean McGonagill	132	2010–11 2011–12 2012–13 2013–14
9	Chuck Savage	299	1988–89 1989–90 1990–91 1991–92
10	Rick Lloyd	127	1988–89 1989–90 1990–91 1991–92

Season
Rk	Player	Steals	Season
1	Alex Bynum	62	1983–84
	Alex Bynum	62	1981–82
3	Jason Forte	60	2002–03
	David Visscher	60	1986–87
	Marcus Becker	60	2006–07
6	Mike Waitkus	56	1985–86
7	Chuck Savage	55	1990–91
8	Mike Waitkus	54	1984–85
9	Luke Ruscoe	53	2004–05
10	Keenen Jeppesen	51	2005–06

Single game
Rk	Player	Steals	Season	Opponent
1	Mike Waitkus	10	1982–83	Dartmouth
2	Shaun Ethridge	7	1998–99	Cornell
	Adrian Williams	7	2008–09	Holy Cross
	Kino Lilly Jr.	7	2023–24	Dartmouth
5	Patrick Powers	6	2003–04	Penn
	Luke Ruscoe	6	2003–04	Yale
	Mike Martin	6	2002–03	Cornell
	David Visscher	6	1986–87	Bryant
	Bill Chapman	6	1981–82	Yale
	Alex Bynum	6	1981–82	Columbia
	Alex Bynum	6	1981–82	Cornell
	Dean Erickson	6	1980–81	Dartmouth
	Matt Sullivan	6	2012–13	Columbia

== Blocks ==
Career
Rk	Player	Blocks	Seasons
1	Cedric Kuakumensah	311	2012–13 2013–14 2014–15 2015–16
2	Matt Mullery	163	2006–07 2007–08 2008–09 2009–10
3	Jaylan Gainey	124	2018–19 2019–20 2021–22
4	Alai Nuualiitia	119	1999–00 2000–01 2001–02 2002–03
5	Andrew McCarthy	104	2009–10 2010–11 2011–12
6	Stark Langs	93	1981–82 1982–83 1983–84 1984–85
7	Jamie Kilburn	89	2000–01 2001–02 2002–03 2003–04
8	N'famara Dabo	86	2023–24 2024–25 2025–26
9	Desmond Cambridge	79	2017–18 2018–19
10	Anthony Katsaros	77	1984–85 1985–86 1986–87 1987–88

Season
Rk	Player	Blocks	Season
1	Cedric Kuakumensah	93	2013–14
2	Cedric Kuakumensah	76	2014–15
	Cedric Kuakumensah	76	2015–16
4	Cedric Kuakumensah	66	2012–13
5	Jaylan Gainey	62	2021–22
6	Matt Mullery	59	2008–09
7	Jaylan Gainey	54	2019–20
8	Desmond Cambridge	52	2018–19
9	Matt Mullery	48	2009–10
10	N'famara Dabo	45	2024–25

Single game
Rk	Player	Blocks	Season	Opponent
1	N'famara Dabo	11	2025–26	Hampton
2	Jaylan Gainey	8	2021–22	Columbia
3	Andrew McCarthy	7	2011–12	Dartmouth
	Cedric Kuakumensah	7	2012–13	Penn
	Cedric Kuakumensah	7	2012–13	Cornell
	Cedric Kuakumensah	7	2013–14	Cornell
	Cedric Kuakumensah	7	2013–14	Dartmouth
	Cedric Kuakumensah	7	2015–16	Rhode Island
	Cedric Kuakumensah	7	2015–16	Princeton
	Jaylan Gainey	7	2019–20	Merrimack
