= List of Brown Bears men's basketball head coaches =

The following is a list of Brown Bears men's basketball head coaches. The Bears have had 31 coaches in their 116-season history.

Brown's current head coach is Mike Martin. He was hired in May 2012 to replace Jesse Agel, who was fired after the 2011–12 season.

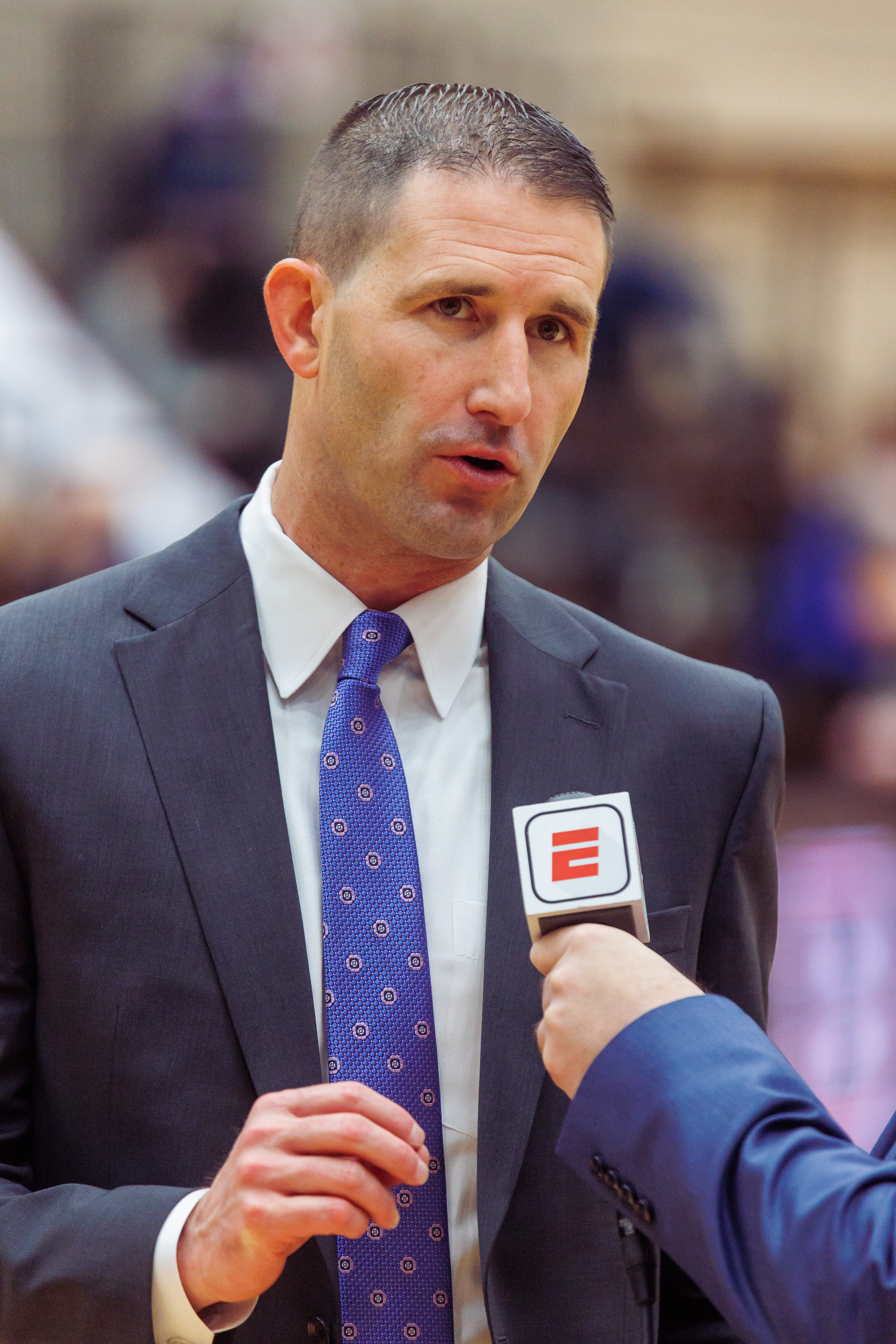
Mike Martin

No.	Tenure	Coach	Years	Record	Pct.
1	1900–1901	Ed Benjamin	1	3–4	.429
2	1901–1902	Charles Ray	1	5–15	.250
3	1902–1903; 1904–1905	Paul DeWolf	2	18–16	.529
4	1903–1904	Henry Ahrens	1	8–11	.421
5	1905–1906	Oscar Rackle	1	4–7	.364
6	1906–1907	W. W. Reynolds	1	10–7	.588
7	1907–1909	J. Donald Pryor	2	16–18	.471
8	1909–1910	Walter White	1	5–9	.357
9	1910–1912	J. Russell McKay	2	14–12	.538
10	1918–1919	Louis Pieri	1	2–12	.143
11	1919–1920	Ed Freeman	1	5–10	.333
12	1920–1921	Florence Harvey	1	5–9	.357
13	1921–1923	Walter Snell	2	19–20	.487
14	1923–1926	Harold Evans	3	27–24	.529
15	1926–1929	Tuss McLaughry	3	17–32	.347
16	1929–1931	Rufus Bond	2	16–22	.421
17	1931–1938	Art Kahler	7	46–67	.407
18	1938–1941	George E. Allen	3	39–20	.661
19	1941–1942	Tippy Dye	1	11–7	.611
20	1942–1946	Rip Engle	4	39–44	.470
21	1946–1947	Weeb Ewbank	1	8–12	.400
22	1947–1954	Robert Morris	7	61–87	.412
23	1954–1969	L. Stanley Ward	15	133–261	.338
24	1969–1978	Gerry Alaimo	9	88–145	.378
25	1978–1981	Joe Mullaney	3	29–49	.372
26	1981–1991	Mike Cingiser	10	93–170	.354
27	1991–1999	Frank Dobbs	8	67–141	.322
28	1999–2006	Glen Miller	7	93–99	.484
29	2006–2008	Craig Robinson	2	30–28	.517
30	2008–2012	Jesse Agel	4	39–79	.331
31	2012–present (Note: Brown's 2020–21 season was cancelled due to the COVID-19 pandemic.)	Mike Martin	10	135–153	.469
Totals		31 coaches	116 seasons	1,082–1,529	.414
Records updated through end of 2022–23 season Source
