= 1986 Big East men's basketball tournament =

- Classification: Division I
- Season: 1985–86
- Teams: 9
- Site: Madison Square Garden; New York City
- Champions: St. John's (2nd title)
- Winning coach: Lou Carnesecca (2nd title)
- MVP: Dwayne Washington (Syracuse)
- Television: Big East Network, ESPN

1985–86 Big East men's basketball standings
	Conf.				Overall
Team	W		L	PCT	W		L	PCT
No. 4 St. John's †	14	–	2	.875	31	–	5	.861
No. 9 Syracuse	14	–	2	.875	26	–	6	.813
No. 13 Georgetown	11	–	5	.688	24	–	8	.750
Villanova	10	–	6	.625	23	–	14	.622
Providence	7	–	9	.438	17	–	14	.548
Pittsburgh	6	–	10	.375	15	–	14	.517
Boston College	4	–	12	.250	13	–	15	.464
Connecticut	3	–	13	.188	12	–	16	.429
Seton Hall	3	–	13	.188	14	–	18	.438
† 1986 Big East tournament winner As of March 31, 1986; Rankings from AP Poll

The 1986 Big East men's basketball tournament took place at Madison Square Garden in New York City, from March 5 to March 8, 1986. Its winner received the Big East Conference's automatic bid to the 1986 NCAA tournament. It is a single-elimination tournament with four rounds. St. John's had the best regular season conference record and received the #1 seed.

St. John's defeated Syracuse in the championship game 70–69, to claim its second Big East tournament championship.

== Bracket ==
First round March 5, 1986
8	Connecticut	66
9	Seton Hall	76

Quarterfinals; March 6, 1986
1	#5 St. John's	87
9	Seton Hall	68
4	Villanova	75
5	Providence	68
3	#14 Georgetown	57
6	Pittsburgh	56
2	#8 Syracuse	102
7	Boston College	79

Semifinals; March 7, 1986
1	#5 St. John's	75
4	Villanova	64
3	#14 Georgetown	73
2	#8 Syracuse	75^{OT}

Championship Game; March 8, 1986
1	#5 St. John's	70
2	#8 Syracuse	69

== Awards ==
Most Valuable Player: Dwayne Washington, Syracuse

All Tournament Team

- Walter Berry, St. John's
- Mark Jackson, St. John's
- Harold Pressley, Villanova
- Rony Seikaly, Syracuse
- Dwayne Washington, Syracuse
- Reggie Williams, Georgetown
