= 1986 NCAA Men's Basketball All-Americans =

- Awarded for: 1985–86 NCAA Division I men's basketball season

An All-American team is an honorary sports team composed of the best amateur players of a specific season for each team position—who in turn are given the honorific "All-America" and typically referred to as "All-American athletes", or simply "All-Americans". Although the honorees generally do not compete together as a unit, the term is used in U.S. team sports to refer to players who are selected by members of the national media. Caspar Whitney selected the first All-America team in the early days of American football in 1889. The 1986 NCAA Men's Basketball All-Americans are honorary lists that include All-American selections from the Associated Press (AP), the United States Basketball Writers Association (USBWA), the National Association of Basketball Coaches (NABC), and United Press International (UPI) for the 1985–86 NCAA Division I men's basketball season. All selectors chose at least a first and second 5-man team. The AP and UPI chose third teams, while NABC selected a fourth team as well; AP also lists honorable mention selections.

The Consensus 1986 College Basketball All-American team is determined by aggregating the results of the four major All-American teams. To earn "consensus" status, a player must win honors from a majority of the different All-American teams.

== 1986 Consensus All-America team ==
Consensus First Team
Player	Position	Class	Team
Steve Alford	G	Junior	Indiana
Walter Berry	F	Junior	St. John's
Len Bias	F	Senior	Maryland
Johnny Dawkins	G	Senior	Duke
Kenny Walker	F	Senior	Kentucky

Consensus Second Team
Player	Position	Class	Team
Dell Curry	G	Senior	Virginia Tech
Brad Daugherty	C	Senior	North Carolina
Ron Harper	G/F	Senior	Miami (OH)
Danny Manning	F	Sophomore	Kansas
David Robinson	C	Junior	Navy
Scott Skiles	G	Senior	Michigan State

== Individual All-America teams ==
All-America Team
All-America Team	First team		Second team		Third team		Fourth Team	
All-America Team	Player	School	Player	School	Player	School	Player	School
Associated Press	Steve Alford	Indiana	Dell Curry	Virginia Tech	William Bedford	Memphis State	No fourth team	
Associated Press	Walter Berry	St. John's	Brad Daugherty	North Carolina	Mark Price	Georgia Tech	No fourth team	
Associated Press	Len Bias	Maryland	Ron Harper	Miami (OH)	David Robinson	Navy	No fourth team	
Associated Press	Johnny Dawkins	Duke	Danny Manning	Kansas	Roy Tarpley	Michigan	No fourth team	
Associated Press	Kenny Walker	Kentucky	Scott Skiles	Michigan State	Dwayne Washington	Syracuse	No fourth team	
USBWA	Walter Berry	St. John's	Dell Curry	Virginia Tech	No third or fourth teams			
USBWA	Len Bias	Maryland	Ron Harper	Miami (OH)	No third or fourth teams			
USBWA	Brad Daugherty	North Carolina	Danny Manning	Kansas	No third or fourth teams			
USBWA	Johnny Dawkins	Duke	David Robinson	Navy	No third or fourth teams			
USBWA	Kenny Walker	Kentucky	Scott Skiles	Michigan State	No third or fourth teams			
NABC	Steve Alford	Indiana	Brad Daugherty	North Carolina	Dell Curry	Virginia Tech	Mark Alarie	Duke
NABC	Walter Berry	St. John's	Ron Harper	Miami (OH)	Chuck Person	Auburn	William Bedford	Memphis State
NABC	Len Bias	Maryland	Danny Manning	Kansas	John Salley	Georgia Tech	Steve Mitchell	Alabama-Birmingham
NABC	Johnny Dawkins	Duke	Mark Price	Georgia Tech	Roy Tarpley	Michigan	Scott Skiles	Michigan State
NABC	Kenny Walker	Kentucky	David Robinson	Navy	Dwayne Washington	Syracuse	Kenny Smith	North Carolina
UPI	Walter Berry	St. John's	Steve Alford	Indiana	Mark Alarie	Duke	No fourth team	
UPI	Len Bias	Maryland	Brad Daugherty	North Carolina	Dell Curry	Virginia Tech	No fourth team	
UPI	Johnny Dawkins	Duke	Ron Harper	Miami (OH)	Reggie Miller	UCLA	No fourth team	
UPI	Scott Skiles	Michigan State	Danny Manning	Kansas	Mark Price	Georgia Tech	No fourth team	
UPI	Kenny Walker	Kentucky	Dwayne Washington	Syracuse	David Robinson	Navy	No fourth team	

AP Honorable Mention:

- Rafael Addison, Syracuse
- Mark Alarie, Duke
- Wendell Alexis, Syracuse
- Cadillac Anderson, Houston
- Terrance Bailey, Wagner
- Freddie Banks, UNLV
- Ken Barlow, Notre Dame
- Jerome Batiste, McNeese State
- Kenny Battle, Northern Illinois
- Dale Blaney, West Virginia
- Muggsy Bogues, Wake Forest
- Johnny Brown, New Mexico
- John Brownlee, Texas
- Jeff Chatman, BYU
- Derrick Chievous, Missouri
- Dave Colbert, Dayton
- Norris Coleman, Kansas State
- Fennis Dembo, Wyoming
- Bruce Douglas, Illinois
- Greg Dreiling, Kansas
- Dave Feitl, UTEP,
- Paul Fortier, Washington
- Alvin Franklin, Houston
- Kenny Gattison, Old Dominion
- Tony George, Fairfield
- Gary Grant, Michigan
- Greg Grant, Utah State
- Jeff Grayer, Iowa State
- Steve Hale, North Carolina
- Hersey Hawkins, Bradley
- David Henderson, Duke
- Carven Holcombe, TCU
- Dave Hoppen, Nebraska
- Jeff Hornacek, Iowa State
- Kevin Houston, Army
- Mark Jackson, St. John's
- Michael Jackson, Georgetown
- Buck Johnson, Alabama
- Darryl Johnson, Michigan State
- Kevin Johnson, California
- Anthony Jones, UNLV
- Nicky Jones, VCU
- Earl Kelley, Connecticut
- Ron Kellogg, Kansas
- Darryl Kennedy, Oklahoma
- Steve Kerr, Arizona
- Larry Krystkowiak, Montana
- Byron Larkin, Xavier
- Kevin Lewis, SMU
- Reggie Lewis, Northeastern
- Troy Lewis, Purdue
- Carl Lott, TCU
- Don Marbury, Texas A&M
- Dan Majerle, Central Michigan
- Maurice Martin, St. Joseph's
- Jim McCaffrey, Holy Cross
- Tim McCalister, Oklahoma
- Andre McCloud, Seton Hall
- Roger McCready, Boston College
- Forrest McKenzie, Loyola Marymount
- Reggie Miller, UCLA
- Jerome Mincy, UAB
- Steve Mitchell, UAB
- Todd Mitchell, Purdue
- Keith Morrison, Washington State
- Ken Norman, Illinois
- José Ortiz, Oregon State
- Dan Palombizio, Ball State
- Chuck Person, Auburn
- Dwayne Polee, Pepperdine
- Olden Polynice, Virginia
- Harold Pressley, Villanova
- Dwayne Randall, Nevada
- David Rivers, Notre Dame
- John Salley, Georgia Tech
- Brad Sellers, Ohio State
- Charles Smith, Pittsburgh
- Juden Smith, UTEP
- Keith Smith, Loyola Marymount
- Kenny Smith, North Carolina
- Otis Smith, Jacksonville
- Rich Strong, Colorado State
- Jerry Stroman, Utah
- Rick Suder, Duquesne
- Robert Tatum, Ohio
- Billy Thompson, Louisville
- Andre Turner, Memphis State
- Milt Wagner, Louisville
- Chris Washburn, NC State
- Anthony Watson, San Diego State
- Chris Welp, Washington
- Tony White, Tennessee
- John Williams, LSU
- Reggie Williams, Georgetown
- David Wingate, Georgetown
