= 1985–86 Yale Bulldogs men's basketball team =

American college basketball season

1985–86 Yale Bulldogs men's basketball
- Conference: Ivy League
- Record: 13–13 (7–7 Ivy)
- Head coach: Tom Brennan (4th season)
- Assistant coaches: Mike Mucci; Larry Mangino
- Captain: Ken Wheeler
- Home arena: John J. Lee Amphitheater

1985–86 Ivy League men's basketball standings
	Conf.				Overall
Team	W		L	PCT	W		L	PCT
Brown	10	–	4	.714	16	–	11	.593
Penn	9	–	5	.643	15	–	11	.577
Cornell	9	–	5	.643	14	–	12	.538
Princeton	7	–	7	.500	13	–	13	.500
Yale	7	–	7	.500	13	–	13	.500
Columbia	6	–	8	.429	12	–	14	.462
Dartmouth	6	–	8	.429	11	–	15	.423
Harvard	2	–	12	.143	6	–	20	.231
Rankings from AP Poll

The 1985–86 Yale Bulldogs men's basketball team represented the Yale University during the 1985–86 NCAA Division I men's basketball season. The Bulldogs, led by 4th year head coach Tom Brennan, played their home games at John J. Lee Amphitheater of the Payne Whitney Gymnasium and were members of the Ivy League. They finished the season 13–13, 7–7 in Ivy League play to finish in fifth place.

== Roster ==
1985–86 Yale Bulldogs men's basketball team
Players
Coaches

Pos.	#	Name	Height	Weight	Year	Hometown
F	5	Byron Taylor	6 ft 5 in (1.96 m)	200 lb (91 kg)	Jr	Youngstown, Ohio
G	10	Val Carlotti	5 ft 10 in (1.78 m)	165 lb (75 kg)	So	Bronx, New York
G/F	11	Ken Wheeler	6 ft 2 in (1.88 m)	165 lb (75 kg)	Jr	Springfield Gardens, New York
G	12	Peter White	5 ft 10 in (1.78 m)	160 lb (73 kg)	So	Williamsport, Pennsylvania
G	14	John Rice	6 ft 3 in (1.91 m)	185 lb (84 kg)	So	Washington, D.C.
C	15	Chris Dudley	6 ft 10 in (2.08 m)	235 lb (107 kg)	Jr	Solana Beach, California
F	21	Eric Mitchell	6 ft 6 in (1.98 m)	205 lb (93 kg)	So	Chevy Chase, Maryland
F	22	Michael McMahon	6 ft 5 in (1.96 m)	216 lb (98 kg)	Fr	West Haven, Connecticut
G	23	Brian Fitzpatrick	6 ft 7 in (2.01 m)	190 lb (86 kg)	So	Irvington, New York
F	24	Paul Maley	6 ft 7 in (2.01 m)	210 lb (95 kg)	So	Los Alamos, New Mexico
F	32	Chad Ludington	6 ft 8 in (2.03 m)	220 lb (100 kg)	Jr	Chapel Hill, North Carolina
G/F	34	Matt Whitehead	6 ft 4 in (1.93 m)	200 lb (91 kg)	So	Stamford, Connecticut
C	42	Ricky Ewing	6 ft 11 in (2.11 m)	235 lb (107 kg)	So	Nashville, Tennessee
F	44	Brian Kasbar	6 ft 7 in (2.01 m)	240 lb (109 kg)	So	Summit, New Jersey
F	45	Arthur Mann	6 ft 4 in (1.93 m)	200 lb (91 kg)	Fr	Lancaster, Pennsylvania

Head coach

- Tom Brennan

Assistant coach(es)

- Mike Mucci
- Larry Mangino

Legend

- (C) Team captain
- (S) Suspended
- (I) Ineligible
- (W) Walk-on
- Injured
- Current redshirt

Roster

== Schedule ==
Date time, TV	Rank^{#}	Opponent^{#}	Result	Record	Site city, state
November 23*		Case Western	W 97–71	1–0	Payne Whitney Gymnasium; New Haven, CT
November 26*		at Connecticut	L 76–80	1–1	Hartford Civic Center; Hartford, Connecticut
November 30*		at Fairfield	W 69–67	2–1	Alumni Hall; Fairfield, Connecticut
December 6*		vs. Stanford	L 108–129	2–2	
December 7*		vs. St. Mary’s (CA)	L 81–84	2–3	
December 10*		Clark	L 70–78	2–4	Payne Whitney Gymnasium; New Haven, CT
January 2*		Holy Cross	W 86–77	3–4	Payne Whitney Gymnasium; New Haven, CT
January 4*		Vermont	W 84–75	4–4	Payne Whitney Gymnasium; New Haven, CT
January 9*		Trinity	L 64–67	4–5	Payne Whitney Gymnasium; New Haven, CT
January 11*		at New Hampshire	L 64–67	4–6	Lundholm Gym; Durham, NH
January 13		at Brown	L 65–68	4–7 (0–1)	Marvel Gymnasium; Providence, RI
January 17		at Cornell	L 51–64	4–8 (0–2)	Barton Hall; Ithaca, NY
January 18		at Columbia	W 71–70	5–8 (1–2)	Levien Gymnasium; New York
January 23*		Amry	W 54–51	6–8 (1–2)	Payne Whitney Gymnasium; New Haven, CT
January 25		Brown	W 73–70	7–8 (2–2)	Payne Whitney Gymnasium; New Haven, CT
January 28*		at Manhattan	W 90–63	8–8 (2–2)	Draddy Gymnasium; The Bronx, NY
January 31		Harvard	W 54–45	9–8 (3–2)	Payne Whitney Gymnasium; New Haven, CT
February 1		Dartmouth	L 69–82	9–9 (3–3)	Payne Whitney Gymnasium; New Haven, CT
February 7		at Princeton	W 52–47	10–9 (4–3)	Jadwin Gymnasium; Princeton, New Jersey
February 8		at Penn	L 67–71	10–10 (4–4)	The Palestra; Philadelphia, Pennsylvania
February 14		Columbia	W 70–66	11–10 (5–4)	Payne Whitney Gymnasium; New Haven, CT
February 15		Cornell	L 73–79	11–11 (5–5)	Payne Whitney Gymnasium; New Haven, CT
February 21		Penn	L 72–89	11–12 (5–6)	Payne Whitney Gymnasium; New Haven, CT
February 22		Princeton	W 64–50	12–12 (6–6)	Payne Whitney Gymnasium; New Haven, CT
February 28		at Dartmouth	L 71–82	12–13 (6–7)	Alumni Gymnasium; Hanover, New Hampshire
March 1		at Harvard	W 82–70	13–13 (7–7)	Lavietes Pavilion; Allston, Massachusetts
*Non-conference game. ^{#}Rankings from AP Poll. (#) Tournament seedings in parentheses.
