= 1985–86 Syracuse Orangemen basketball team =

American college basketball season

1985–86 Syracuse Orangemen basketball

Big East Regular Season Co-Champions

NCAA tournament, second round, L 85–97 vs. Navy
- Conference: Big East Conference

Ranking
- Coaches: No. 9
- AP: No. 9
- Record: 26–6 (14–2 Big East)
- Head coach: Jim Boeheim (10th season)
- Assistant coaches: Bernie Fine (10th season); Wayne Morgan (2nd season)
- Home arena: Carrier Dome

1985–86 Big East men's basketball standings
	Conf.				Overall
Team	W		L	PCT	W		L	PCT
No. 4 St. John's †	14	–	2	.875	31	–	5	.861
No. 9 Syracuse	14	–	2	.875	26	–	6	.813
No. 13 Georgetown	11	–	5	.688	24	–	8	.750
Villanova	10	–	6	.625	23	–	14	.622
Providence	7	–	9	.438	17	–	14	.548
Pittsburgh	6	–	10	.375	15	–	14	.517
Boston College	4	–	12	.250	13	–	15	.464
Connecticut	3	–	13	.188	12	–	16	.429
Seton Hall	3	–	13	.188	14	–	18	.438
† 1986 Big East tournament winner As of March 31, 1986; Rankings from AP Poll

The 1985–86 Syracuse Orangemen basketball team represented Syracuse University during the 1985–86 men's college basketball season. The head coach was Jim Boeheim, serving for his 10th year. The team played home games at the Carrier Dome in Syracuse, New York. The team finished with a 26–6 (14–2) record and received a large bid to the 1986 NCAA tournament. As the #2 seed in the East Region Syracuse began with an easy win over Brown 101–52. But in the second round they were upset by the David Robinson led Navy 97–85.

== Roster ==
1985–86 Syracuse Orange men's basketball team
Players
Coaches

Pos.	#	Name	Height	Weight	Year	Hometown
C	4	Rony Seikaly	6 ft 10 in (2.08 m)	240 lb (109 kg)	So	Athens, Greece
G	11	Greg Monroe	6 ft 3 in (1.91 m)	195 lb (88 kg)	Jr	Rochester, New York
SF	12	Rafael Addison	6 ft 7 in (2.01 m)	210 lb (95 kg)	Sr	Jersey City, New Jersey
G	20	Sherman Douglas	6 ft 0 in (1.83 m)	170 lb (77 kg)	Fr	Washington, D.C.
G	24	Joel Katz	5 ft 11 in (1.8 m)	182 lb (83 kg)	Jr	San Juan, Puerto Rico
F	25	Howard Triche	6 ft 5 in (1.96 m)	215 lb (98 kg)	Jr	Syracuse, New York
F/C	30	Derek Brower	6 ft 9 in (2.06 m)	230 lb (104 kg)	So	North Babylon, New York
PG	31	Dwayne Washington	6 ft 2 in (1.88 m)	185 lb (84 kg)	Jr	Brooklyn, New York
F	33	Herman Harried	6 ft 7 in (2.01 m)	210 lb (95 kg)	Fr	Baltimore, Maryland
PF	42	Rodney Walker	6 ft 9 in (2.06 m)	225 lb (102 kg)	Fr	Baltimore, Maryland
PF	45	Wendell Alexis	6 ft 8 in (2.03 m)	210 lb (95 kg)	Sr	Queens, New York
F	50	Joey Kohm	6 ft 3 in (1.91 m)	205 lb (93 kg)	Jr	Ithaca, New York

Head coach

- Jim Boeheim (Syracuse)

Assistant coach(es)

- Bernie Fine (Syracuse)
- Wayne Morgan (St. Lawrence)
- Barry Copeland (Central Michigan)

Legend

- (C) Team captain
- (S) Suspended
- (I) Ineligible
- (W) Walk-on
- Injured
- Current redshirt

Roster
Last update: 2019-Mar-16

== Schedule ==
Date time, TV	Rank^{#}	Opponent^{#}	Result	Record	Site city, state
Non-conference regular season
November 23*	No. 4	Utica	W 102–55	1-0	Carrier Dome; Syracuse, NY
November 25*	No. 4	Cornell	W 96–62	2-0	Carrier Dome; Syracuse, NY
November 29*	No. 4	USC	W 102–68	3-0	Carrier Dome; Syracuse, NY
December 6*	No. 4	La Salle; Carrier Classic	W 97–72	4-0	Carrier Dome; Syracuse, NY
December 7*	No. 4	Navy; Carrier Classic	W 89–67	5-0	Carrier Dome; Syracuse, NY
December 14*	No. 4	Brooklyn	W 102–61	6-0	Carrier Dome; Syracuse, NY
December 21*	No. 4	St. Bonaventure	W 83–64	7-0	Carrier Dome; Syracuse, NY
December 30*	No. 4	C. W. Post	W 88–68	8–0	Carrier Dome; Syracuse, NY
Big East Conference Regular Season
January 2	No. 4	Boston College	W 68–52	9-0 (1-0)	Carrier Dome; Syracuse, NY
January 4	No. 4	Seton Hall	W 68–52	10-0 (2-0)	Carrier Dome; Syracuse, NY
January 6	No. 4	at Villanova	W 77–72	11-0 (3-0)	Philadelphia, PA
January 8	No. 4	at Fairfield	W 90–67	12-0	New Haven Coliseum; New Haven, CT
January 11	No. 4	Pittsburgh	W 76–68	13-0 (4-0)	Carrier Dome; Syracuse, NY
January 15	No. 4	at No. 15 Georgetown; Rivalry	L 70–73	13-1 (4-1)	Washington, D.C.
January 18*	No. 4	at No. 13 Louisville	L 73–83	13-2	Freedom Hall; Louisville, KY
January 22	No. 9	Providence	W 95–73	14-2 (5-1)	Carrier Dome; Syracuse, NY
January 25	No. 9	Connecticut; Rivalry	W 80–67	15-2 (6-1)	Carrier Dome; Syracuse, NY
January 28	No. 11	at Boston College	W 80–55	16-2 (7-1)	Boston Garden; Boston, MA
February 1	No. 11	No. 7 St. John's	W 68–64	17-2 (8-1)	Carrier Dome; Syracuse, NY
February 5	No. 8	at Seton Hall	W 84–61	18-2 (9-1)	Brendan Byrne Arena; East Rutherford, NJ
February 8*	No. 8	No. 14 Notre Dame	L 81–85	18-3	Carrier Dome; Syracuse, NY
February 12	No. 12	Villanova	W 80–57	19-3 (10-1)	Carrier Dome; Syracuse, NY
February 15	No. 12	at Providence	W 76–75	20-3 (11-1)	Providence, RI
February 17	No. 12	at Pittsburgh	W 69–62	21-3 (12-1)	Pittsburgh, PA
February 23	No. 9	No. 13 Georgetown; Rivalry	W 64–63	22-3 (13-1)	Carrier Dome; Syracuse, NY
February 26	No. 6	at No. 8 St. John's	L 79–86	22-4 (13-2)	Madison Square Garden; New York, NY
March 1	No. 6	at Connecticut; Rivalry	W 75–58	23-4 (14-2)	Storrs, CT
Big East tournament
March 6*	No. 8	vs. Boston College; Big East tournament • Quarterfinals	W 102–79	24-4	Madison Square Garden; New York, NY
March 7*	No. 8	vs. No. 14 Georgetown; Big East tournament • Semifinals/Rivalry	W 75–73 ^{OT}	25-4	Madison Square Garden; New York, NY
March 8*	No. 8	vs. No. 5 St. John's; Big East tournament • Final	L 69–70	25-5	Madison Square Garden; New York, NY
NCAA Tournament
March 14*	No. 9	vs. Brown; NCAA tournament • First Round	W 101–52	26-5	Syracuse, NY
March 16*	No. 9	vs. No. 17 Navy; NCAA Tournament • Second Round	L 85–97	26-6	Syracuse, NY
*Non-conference game. ^{#}Rankings from AP Poll. (#) Tournament seedings in parentheses.

== Statistics ==
- Leading scorer: Dwayne Washington 17.3 ppg
- Leading rebounder: Rony Seikaly 7.8 rpg
