= St. John's Red Storm men's basketball statistical leaders =

The St. John's Red Storm men's basketball statistical leaders are individual statistical leaders of the St. John's Red Storm men's basketball program in various categories, including points, three-pointers, assists, blocks, rebounds, and steals. Within those areas, the lists identify single-game, single-season, and career leaders. The Red Storm represent St. John's University in the NCAA Division I Big East Conference.

St. John's began competing in intercollegiate basketball in 1907. However, the school's record book does not generally list records from before the 1950s, as records from before this period are often incomplete and inconsistent. Since scoring was much lower in this era, and teams played much fewer games during a typical season, it is likely that few or no players from this era would appear on these lists anyway.

The NCAA did not officially record assists as a statistic in Division I until the 1983–84 season, and blocks and steals until the 1985–86 season, but St. John's record books includes players in these stats before these seasons. These lists are updated through the end of the 2020–21 season.

== Scoring ==
Career
Rk	Player	Points	Seasons
1	Chris Mullin	2,440	1981–82 1982–83 1983–84 1984–85
2	Malik Sealy	2,401	1988–89 1989–90 1990–91 1991–92
3	D'Angelo Harrison	2,178	2011–12 2012–13 2013–14 2014–15
4	Felipe Lopez	1,927	1994–95 1995–96 1996–97 1997–98
5	Shamorie Ponds	1,870	2016–17 2017–18 2018–19
6	Bob Zawoluk	1,826	1949–50 1950–51 1951–52
7	Zendon Hamilton	1,810	1994–95 1995–96 1996–97 1997–98
8	George Johnson	1,763	1974–75 1975–76 1976–77 1977–78
9	David Russell	1,753	1979–80 1980–81 1981–82 1982–83
10	Glen Williams	1,727	1973–74 1974–75 1975–76 1976–77

Season
Rk	Player	Points	Season
1	Walter Berry	828	1985–86
2	Marcus Hatten	756	2002–03
3	Malik Sealy	707	1990–91
4	Chris Mullin	694	1984–85
5	Malik Sealy	679	1991–92
6	Glen Williams	665	1976–77
7	Bob Zawoluk	654	1950–51
8	Shamorie Ponds	650	2018–19
9	Shamorie Ponds	647	2017–18
10	Marcus Hatten	644	2001–02

Single game
Rk	Player	Points	Season	Opponent
1	Bob Zawoluk	65	1949–50	St. Peter's
2	Harry Boykoff	54	1946–47	St. Francis
3	Harry Boykoff	45	1942–43	St. Joseph's
4	Marcus Hatten	44	2002–03	Rutgers
	Shamorie Ponds	44	2017–18	Marquette
6	Malik Sealy	43	1990–91	Central Conn. St.
7	Ken McIntyre	42	1964–65	Boston College
8	Bootsy Thornton	40	1998–99	Duke
	Bill Schaeffer	40	1972–73	Grambling
	Boo Harvey	40	1989–90	Seton Hall

== Rebounds ==
Career
Rk	Player	Rebounds	Seasons
1	George Johnson	1,240	1974–75 1975–76 1976–77 1977–78
2	Sonny Dove	1,036	1964–65 1965–66 1966–67
3	Tony Jackson	991	1958–59 1959–60 1960–61
4	Zendon Hamilton	949	1994–95 1995–96 1996–97 1997–98
5	LeRoy Ellis	927	1959–60 1960–61 1961–62
6	Malik Sealy	880	1988–89 1989–90 1990–91 1991–92
7	Joel Soriano	870	2021–22 2022–23 2023–24
8	Mel Davis	845	1970–71 1971–72
9	David Russell	832	1979–80 1980–81 1981–82 1982–83
10	Wayne McKoy	824	1977–78 1978–79 1979–80 1980–81

Season
Rk	Player	Rebounds	Season
1	Mel Davis	436	1970–71
2	LeRoy Ellis	430	1961–62
3	Mel Davis	409	1971–72
4	Tony Jackson	401	1958–59
5	Walter Berry	399	1985–86
6	Bob Zawoluk	397	1951–52
7	Joel Soriano	393	2022–23
8	Billy Paultz	389	1969–70
9	Sonny Dove	369	1965–66
10	Sonny Dove	338	1964–65

Single game
Rk	Player	Rebounds	Season	Opponent
1	LeRoy Ellis	30	1961–62	NYU
2	Tony Jackson	27	1958–59	Bradley
3	Mel Davis	26	1971–72	Seton Hall
4	Tony Jackson	25	1958–59	Virginia
	LeRoy Ellis	25	1960–61	Fordham
	LeRoy Ellis	25	1961–62	Syracuse
	LeRoy Ellis	25	1961–62	Fordham
	Billy Paultz	25	1969–70	NYU
	Mel Davis	25	1970–71	Temple
	Mel Davis	25	1971–72	Marshall

== Assists ==
Career
Rk	Player	Assists	Seasons
1	Mark Jackson	738	1983–84 1984–85 1985–86 1986–87
2	Jason Buchanan	665	1988–89 1989–90 1990–91 1991–92
3	Eugene Lawrence	520	2004–05 2005–06 2006–07 2007–08
4	Frank Alagia	478	1972–73 1973–74 1974–75 1975–76
5	Chris Mullin	449	1981–82 1982–83 1983–84 1984–85
6	Shamorie Ponds	413	2016–17 2017–18 2018–19
7	Posh Alexander	391	2020–21 2021–22 2022–23
8	Malik Boothe	370	2007–08 2008–09 2009–10 2010–11
9	Bernard Rencher	352	1977–78 1978–79 1979–80
10	Mel Utley	345	1972–73 1973–74 1974–75

Season
Rk	Player	Assists	Season
1	Mark Jackson	328	1985–86
2	Omar Cook	252	2000–01
3	David Cain	213	1992–93
4	Mark Jackson	193	1986–87
5	Kadary Richmond	191	2024–25
6	Jason Buchanan	188	1990–91
7	Jason Buchanan	187	1991–92
8	Frank Alagia	182	1975–76
9	Boo Harvey	180	1989–90
10	Daniss Jenkins	179	2023–24
11	Erick Barkley	175	1998–99

Single game
Rk	Player	Assists	Season	Opponent
1	Omar Cook	17	2000–01	Stony Brook
2	Mark Jackson	16	1985–86	Providence
3	Omar Cook	15	2000–01	Connecticut
4	Larry Jenkins	14	1972–73	Dartmouth
	Mark Jackson	14	1985–86	Villanova
	Boo Harvey	14	1987–88	Providence
	David Cain	14	1992–93	Connecticut
	David Cain	14	1992–93	Seton Hall
	Shamorie Ponds	14	2018–19	Wagner
10	Mark Jackson	13	1985–86	James Madison
	Mark Jackson	13	1985–86	Villanova
	Omar Cook	13	2000–01	Hofstra
	Omar Cook	13	2000–01	Boston College

== Steals ==
Career
Rk	Player	Steals	Seasons
1	Malik Sealy	238	1988–89 1989–90 1990–91 1991–92
2	Shamorie Ponds	225	2016–17 2017–18 2018–19
3	Jason Buchanan	220	1988–89 1989–90 1990–91 1991–92
4	Chris Mullin	213	1981–82 1982–83 1983–84 1984–85
5	Marcus Hatten	205	2001–02 2002–03
6	Sir'Dominic Pointer	200	2011–12 2012–13 2013–14 2014–15
7	Eugene Lawrence	196	2004–05 2005–06 2006–07 2007–08
8	Posh Alexander	193	2020–21 2021–22 2022–23
9	D.J. Kennedy	183	2007–08 2008–09 2009–10 2010–11
10	Mark Jackson	174	1983–84 1984–85 1985–86 1986–87

Season
Rk	Player	Steals	Season
1	Marcus Hatten	105	2001–02
2	Marcus Hatten	100	2002–03
3	Shamorie Ponds	87	2018–19
4	Erick Barkley	84	1999–00
5	Erick Barkley	83	1998–99
6	Justin Simon	82	2017–18
7	Ron Artest	76	1998–99
8	Malik Sealy	75	1989–90
9	Chris Mullin	72	1984–85
	David Cain	72	1992–93
	Kadary Richmond	72	2024–25

Single game
Rk	Player	Steals	Season	Opponent
1	Marcus Hatten	10	2002–03	Syracuse
2	Marcus Hatten	8	2001–02	Tennessee
	Marcus Hatten	8	2001–02	Fordham
	Bernard Rencher	8	1979–80	Connecticut
5	Marcus Hatten	7	2002–03	Virginia
	Marcus Hatten	7	2001–02	Providence
	Marcus Hatten	7	2001–02	Villanova
	Erick Barkley	7	1999–00	Villanova
	Erick Barkley	7	1999–00	Coppin State
	Erick Barkley	7	1998–99	Columbia
	Bernard Rencher	7	1979–80	Centenary
	Bob Kelly	7	1982–83	Providence
	Bob Kelly	7	1982–83	Connecticut
	Chris Mullin	7	1984–85	Providence
	Mark Jackson	7	1986–87	FDU
	Omar Cook	7	2000–01	Seton Hall
	Sir'Dominic Pointer	7	2014–15	Tulane
	Shamorie Ponds	7	2018–19	VCU
	Julian Champagnie	7	2021–22	Butler

== Blocks ==
Career
Rk	Player	Blocks	Seasons
1	Chris Obekpa	321	2012–13 2013–14 2014–15
2	Robert Werdann	188	1988–89 1989–90 1990–91 1991–92
3	Sir'Dominic Pointer	173	2011–12 2012–13 2013–14 2014–15
4	Zuby Ejiofor	165	2023–24 2024–25 2025–26
5	Wayne McKoy	164	1977–78 1978–79 1979–80 1980–81
6	Tariq Owens	163	2016–17 2017–18
7	Joel Soriano	156	2021–22 2022–23 2023–24
8	Bill Wennington	152	1981–82 1982–83 1983–84 1984–85
9	Kassoum Yakwe	149	2015–16 2016–17 2017–18
10	George Johnson	130	1974–75 1975–76 1976–77 1977–78
11	Walter Berry	121	1984–85 1985–86

Season
Rk	Player	Blocks	Season
1	Chris Obekpa	133	2012–13
2	Chris Obekpa	94	2013–14
	Chris Obekpa	94	2014–15
	Tariq Owens	94	2017–18
5	Sir'Dominic Pointer	80	2014–15
6	Zuby Ejiofor	79	2025–26
7	Walter Berry	76	1985–86
8	Robert Werdann	69	1990–91
	Tariq Owens	69	2016–17
10	Robert Werdann	66	1989–90
	Kassoum Yakwe	66	2015–16

Single game
Rk	Player	Blocks	Season	Opponent
1	Chris Obekpa	11	2012–13	Fordham
2	Chris Obekpa	9	2012–13	St. Francis (N.Y.)
	Chris Obekpa	9	2013–14	Monmouth
4	Chris Obekpa	8	2012–13	Detroit
	Chris Obekpa	8	2014–15	LIU Brooklyn
	Sir'Dominic Pointer	8	2014–15	Creighton
	Tariq Owens	8	2017–18	Georgetown
	Zuby Ejiofor	8	2025–26	Ole Miss
	Zuby Ejiofor	8	2025–26	Iona
10	Chris Obekpa	7	2012–13	Marquette
	Robert Werdann	7	1989–90	Hofstra
	Chris Obekpa	7	2013–14	Marquette
	Chris Obekpa	7	2013–14	Penn State
	Chris Obekpa	7	2013–14	Bucknell
	Kassoum Yakwe	7	2015–16	Marquette
	Kassoum Yakwe	7	2016–17	Delaware State
	Zuby Ejiofor	7	2025–26	Connecticut
