= Carven Holcombe =

American basketball player (born 1964)

Personal information
- Born: September 10, 1964 (age 62) Houston, Texas, U.S.
- Listed height: 6 ft 5 in (1.96 m)
- Listed weight: 202 lb (92 kg)

Career information
- High school: Yates (Houston, Texas)
- College: TCU (1983–1987)
- NBA draft: 1987: 4th round, 80th overall pick
- Drafted by: Cleveland Cavaliers
- Playing career: 1987–1993
- Position: Shooting guard

Career history
- 1990–1991: Ramat Gan

Career highlights
- SWC Player of the Year (1987); AP honorable mention All-American (1986); First-team All-SWC (1987); 2× Second-team All-SWC (1985, 1986); SWC Freshman of the Year (1984)
- Stats at Basketball Reference

Carven Holcombe (born September 10, 1964) is an American former basketball player known for his college career at Texas Christian University (TCU) between 1983 and 1987. He also played professionally in Belgium, France, and Israel at the shooting guard position.

== High school and college careers ==
Born in Houston, Texas, Holcombe attended Yates High School in his hometown, where he was a teammate of Rickie Winslow. As a senior in 1982–83, he was named "Who's Who" in basketball and was selected as the Texas High School Player of the Year after averaging 25 points and nine rebounds per game while leading Yates to a 37–3 record.

Holcombe went on to play college basketball for the TCU Horned Frogs from 1983 to 1987. In his collegiate debut against UT Arlington, he scored 26 points. In 1982–83, he was selected as the Southwest Conference (SWC) Freshman of the Year after averaging 13.4 points and 4.9 rebounds per game. He continued to improve throughout the rest of his career, garnering further personal accolades while also leading the Horned Frogs to team success as well. When Holcombe was a sophomore in 1984–85, TCU won five more games than the previous season, and he was selected to the All-SWC Second Team after averaging 16.5 points and 5.8 rebounds per game. Prior to his junior season, Holcombe was switched from small forward to shooting guard by head coach Jim Killingsworth. That year, Holcombe's numbers dipped a bit to 12.7 points and 5.0 rebounds, respectively, but he had a career-high 3.3 assists per game. TCU tied for the SWC regular season championship and earned a berth in the 1986 National Invitation Tournament where they won one game. Holcombe repeated as an All-SWC Second Team honoree, and he was also named to the Associated Press Honorable Mention All-America team for 1986. In his senior season of 1986–87, TCU repeated as SWC champions but earned a berth in the 1987 NCAA tournament, advancing to its second round. Holcombe, who served as team captain all four years for TCU, averaged 17.5 points, 5.3 rebounds, and 2.2 assists per game. He was placed on the All-SWC First Team and was also named the SWC Player of the Year, becoming just the third TCU player so honored in the award's then-30 year old history.

In 2004, TCU enshrined Holcombe in their athletics hall of fame.

== Professional career and later life ==
Holcombe was selected in the 1987 NBA draft by the Cleveland Cavaliers in the fourth round (80th overall). He did not play in the NBA, however, instead he pursued a professional career abroad in Belgium, France, and Israel which lasted six years. After his basketball career, Holcombe worked in management for two large grocery chains and then opened A-1 Powerwash Services. He also coaches high school basketball in the Dallas, Texas area.
