= 1985–86 St. John's Redmen basketball team =

American college basketball season

1985–86 St. John's Redmen men's basketball

Big East tournament Champions Big East Regular Season Co-Champions Lapchick Memorial Champions ECAC Holiday Festival Champions

NCAA men's Division I tournament, second round
- Conference: Big East Conference (1979–2013)

Ranking
- Coaches: No. 3
- AP: No. 4
- Record: 31–5 (14–2 Big East)
- Head coach: Lou Carnesecca
- Assistant coaches: Brian Mahoney; Al LoBalbo; Ron Rutledge
- Home arena: Alumni Hall; Madison Square Garden

1985–86 Big East men's basketball standings
	Conf.				Overall
Team	W		L	PCT	W		L	PCT
No. 4 St. John's †	14	–	2	.875	31	–	5	.861
No. 9 Syracuse	14	–	2	.875	26	–	6	.813
No. 13 Georgetown	11	–	5	.688	24	–	8	.750
Villanova	10	–	6	.625	23	–	14	.622
Providence	7	–	9	.438	17	–	14	.548
Pittsburgh	6	–	10	.375	15	–	14	.517
Boston College	4	–	12	.250	13	–	15	.464
Connecticut	3	–	13	.188	12	–	16	.429
Seton Hall	3	–	13	.188	14	–	18	.438
† 1986 Big East tournament winner As of March 31, 1986; Rankings from AP Poll

The 1985–86 St. John's Redmen basketball team represented St. John's University during the 1985–86 NCAA Division I men's basketball season. The team was coached by Lou Carnesecca in his eighteenth year at the school. St. John's home games are played at Alumni Hall and Madison Square Garden and the team is a member of the Big East Conference.

St John's made the NCAA Tournament but lost in the second round to Auburn 83–65.

== Roster ==
1985–86 St. John's Red Storm men's basketball team
Players
Coaches

Pos.	#	Name	Height	Weight	Year	Previous school	Hometown
G/F	-	Matt Brust (redshirt)	6 ft 4 in (1.93 m)	—	So	Babylon/North Carolina	Babylon, NY
C	10	Terry Bross	6 ft 9 in (2.06 m)	—	So	Immaculata	Somerville, NJ
G/F	12	Ron Rowan	6 ft 4 in (1.93 m)	—	RS Sr	Beaver Falls/Notre Dame	Beaver Falls, PA
G	13	Mark Jackson (C)	6 ft 3 in (1.91 m)	—	Jr	Bishop Loughlin	Brooklyn, NY
C	14	Marco Baldi	6 ft 11 in (2.11 m)	—	Fr	Long Island Lutheran	Aosta, Italy
F	21	Walter Berry (C)	6 ft 8 in (2.03 m)	—	Jr	Benjamin Franklin/San Jacinto	Bronx, NY
G/F	30	Willie Glass (C)	6 ft 5 in (1.96 m)	—	Jr	Atlantic City	Atlantic City, NJ
F	31	Shelton Jones	6 ft 9 in (2.06 m)	—	So	Amityville Memorial	Amityville, NY
F	33	John Hempel	6 ft 7 in (2.01 m)	—	RS Jr	Union Catholic/UMass	Linden, NJ
G	40	Steve Shurina	6 ft 4 in (1.93 m)	—	So	St. Francis Prep	Woodside, NY

Head coach

- Lou Carnesecca (St. John's, '50)

Assistant coach(es)

- Brian Mahoney
- Al LoBalbo
- Ron Rutledge

Legend

- (C) Team captain
- (S) Suspended
- (I) Ineligible
- (W) Walk-on
- Injured
- Current redshirt

== Schedule and results ==
Date time, TV	Rank^{#}	Opponent^{#}	Result	Record	Site city, state
Regular Season
11/22/85*		vs. No. 19 Navy; Big Apple NIT First Round	W 66-58	1-0	Hartford Civic Center; Hartford, CT
11/24/85*		vs. West Virginia; Big Apple NIT Quarterfinal	W 65-58	2-0	Hartford Civic Center; Hartford, CT
11/29/85*	No. 18	vs. No. 6 Duke; Big Apple NIT Semifinal	L 70-71	2-1	Madison Square Garden; New York, NY
12/01/85*	No. 18	vs. No. 9 Louisville; Big Apple NIT Consolation	W 86-79	3-1	Madison Square Garden; New York, NY
12/03/85*	No. 15	Wagner	W 85-55	4-1	Alumni Hall; Queens, NY
12/06/85*	No. 15	Columbia; Laphick Tournament Opening Round	W 80-58	5-1	Alumni Hall; Queens, NY
12/07/85*	No. 15	Fairleigh Dickinson; Laphick Tournament Championship	W 88-56	6-1	Alumni Hall; Queens, NY
12/11/85*	No. 14	Marist	W 62-48	7-1	Alumni Hall; Queens, NY
12/14/85*	No. 14	at UCLA	W 69-65	8-1	Pauley Pavilion; Los Angeles, CA
12/21/85*	No. 11	Niagara	W 104-61	9-1	Alumni Hall; Queens, NY
12/23/85*	No. 11	Monmouth	W 98-58	10-1	Alumni Hall; Queens, NY
12/26/85*	No. 11	James Madison; ECAC Holiday Festival Semifinal	W 79-57	11-1	Madison Square Garden; New York, NY
12/28/85*	No. 11	St. Bonaventure; ECAC Holiday Festival Championship	W 85-69	12-1	Madison Square Garden; New York, NY
01/02/86	No. 10	at Providence	W 95-90 ^{OT}	13-1 (1-0)	Providence Civic Center; Providence, RI
01/04/86	No. 10	Pittsburgh	W 78-75	14-1 (2-0)	Alumni Hall; Queens, NY
01/07/86	No. 10	at Boston College	L 77-79 ^{OT}	14-2 (2-1)	Boston Garden; Boston, MA
01/11/86	No. 10	No. 13 Georgetown	W 79-74	15-2 (3-1)	Madison Square Garden; New York, NY
01/15/86	No. 9	at Seton Hall	W 74-58	16-2 (4-1)	Meadowlands Arena; East Rutherford, NJ
01/18/86	No. 9	at Connecticut	W 61-60	17-2 (5-1)	Hartford Civic Center; Hartford, CT
01/22/86*	No. 8	Fordham	W 56-47	18-2	Madison Square Garden; New York, NY
01/25/86	No. 8	at Pittsburgh	W 68-67	19-2 (6-1)	Fitzgerald Field House; Pittsburgh, PA
01/29/86	No. 7	Villanova	W 81-61	20-2 (7-1)	Alumni Hall; Queens, NY
02/01/86	No. 7	at No. 11 Syracuse	L 64-68	20-3 (7-2)	Carrier Dome; Syracuse, NY
02/03/86	No. 7	Providence	W 85-61	21-3 (8-2)	Alumni Hall; Queens, NY
02/08/86	No. 10	Boston College	W 87-75	22-3 (9-2)	Alumni Hall; Queens, NY
02/10/86	No. 10	at No. 11 Georgetown	W 60-58	23-3 (10-2)	Capital Centre; Landover, MD
02/15/86	No. 7	Connecticut	W 74-54	24-3 (11-2)	Alumni Hall; Queens, NY
02/18/86	No. 6	at Villanova	W 79-76	25-3 (12-2)	du Pont Pavilion; Villanova, PA
02/22/86*	No. 6	at DePaul	L 72-81	25-4	Rosemont Horizon; Rosemont, IL
02/26/86	No. 8	No. 6 Syracuse	W 86-79	26-4 (13-2)	Madison Square Garden; New York, NY
03/01/86	No. 8	Seton Hall	W 82-70	27-4 (14-2)	Alumni Hall; Queens, NY
Big East tournament
03/06/86	No. 5	vs. Seton Hall; Big East tournament quarterfinal	W 87-68	28-4	Madison Square Garden; New York, NY
03/07/86	No. 5	vs. Villanova; Big East tournament semifinal	W 75-64	29-4	Madison Square Garden; New York, NY
03/08/86	No. 5	vs. No. 8 Syracuse; Big East tournament Championship	W 70-69	30-4	Madison Square Garden; New York, NY
NCAA Tournament
03/14/86*	No. 4	vs. (16) Montana State; NCAA First Round	W 83-74	31-4	Long Beach Arena; Long Beach, CA
03/16/86*	No. 4	vs. (8) Auburn; NCAA Second Round	L 65-81	31-5	Long Beach Arena; Long Beach, CA
*Non-conference game. ^{#}Rankings from AP Poll. (#) Tournament seedings in parentheses.

== Awards and honors ==
- Walter Berry – Consensus First-team All-American, Single season school record for scoring and blocks
- Mark Jackson – NCAA Assists leader, Honorable Mention AP All-American, Single game and season school records for assists

== Team players drafted into the NBA ==
Round	Pick	Player	NBA club
1	14	Walter Berry	Portland Trail Blazers traded to the San Antonio Spurs
3	67	Ron Rowan	Philadelphia 76ers
