= 1985–86 Villanova Wildcats men's basketball team =

American college basketball season

1985–86 Villanova Wildcats men's basketball

NCAA tournament, Round of 32
- Conference: Big East Conference
- Record: 23–14 (10–6 Big East)
- Head coach: Rollie Massimino (13th season)
- Home arena: John Eleuthère du Pont Pavilion (Capacity: 6,500)

1985–86 Big East men's basketball standings
	Conf.				Overall
Team	W		L	PCT	W		L	PCT
No. 4 St. John's †	14	–	2	.875	31	–	5	.861
No. 9 Syracuse	14	–	2	.875	26	–	6	.813
No. 13 Georgetown	11	–	5	.688	24	–	8	.750
Villanova	10	–	6	.625	23	–	14	.622
Providence	7	–	9	.438	17	–	14	.548
Pittsburgh	6	–	10	.375	15	–	14	.517
Boston College	4	–	12	.250	13	–	15	.464
Connecticut	3	–	13	.188	12	–	16	.429
Seton Hall	3	–	13	.188	14	–	18	.438
† 1986 Big East tournament winner As of March 31, 1986; Rankings from AP Poll

The 1985–86 Villanova Wildcats men's basketball team represented Villanova University in the 1985–86 season. The head coach was Rollie Massimino. The team played its home games at The Pavilion in Villanova, Pennsylvania, and was a member of the Big East Conference.

== Previous season ==
Villanova finished the regular season tied for third place in the Big East standings. In the conference tournament, the Wildcats defeated Pittsburgh in the quarterfinal round before losing to St. John's in the semifinals. The team was awarded an at-large bid to the NCAA tournament as No. 8 seed in the Southeast region. After escaping the opening round with a 2-point win over Dayton, Villanova knocked off No. 1 seed Michigan, No. 5 seed Maryland, and No. 2 seed North Carolina to reach the Final Four. They shut down Memphis State in the National Semifinals, while Georgetown handled St. John's in the other National semifinal. The Wildcats played a near perfect game to defeat the Hoyas in the championship game, 66–64. As of the 2021–22 season, Villanova is the only No. 8 seed to win the National championship.

== Roster ==
1985–86 Villanova Wildcats men's basketball team
Players
Coaches

Pos.	#	Name	Height	Weight	Year	Hometown
G	3	Kenny Wilson	5 ft 9 in (1.75 m)	—	Fr
G	4	Dwight Wilbur	6 ft 2 in (1.88 m)	185 lb (84 kg)	Sr	Paterson, New Jersey
G	10	Veltra Dawson	6 ft 1 in (1.85 m)	175 lb (79 kg)	So	Highland Park, Illinois
G	13	Roland Massimino	5 ft 10 in (1.78 m)	165 lb (75 kg)	Sr	Villanova, Pennsylvania
G		Pat Enright	5 ft 10 in (1.78 m)	—	Fr
F	21	Harold Pressley	6 ft 7 in (2.01 m)	210 lb (95 kg)	Sr	Mystic, Connecticut
G	22	Gary Massey	6 ft 6 in (1.98 m)	—	Fr
F	31	Mark Plansky	6 ft 7 in (2.01 m)	—	So
G	32	Harold Jensen	6 ft 5 in (1.96 m)	195 lb (88 kg)	Jr	Trumbull, Connecticut
C	41	Chuck Everson	7 ft 1 in (2.16 m)	255 lb (116 kg)	Sr	Brentwood, New York
G	42	Doug West	6 ft 6 in (1.98 m)	200 lb (91 kg)	Fr
C	43	Wyatt Maker	6 ft 11 in (2.11 m)	245 lb (111 kg)	Jr	Salinas, California
F	50	Connally Brown	6 ft 7 in (2.01 m)	205 lb (93 kg)	Jr	Orange, Texas

Head coach

- Rollie Massimino (Vermont)

Assistant coach(es)

Legend

- (C) Team captain
- (S) Suspended
- (I) Ineligible
- (W) Walk-on
- Injured
- Current redshirt

== Schedule and results ==
Date time, TV	Rank^{#}	Opponent^{#}	Result	Record	Site city, state
Non-conference regular season
Nov 22, 1985*		Drexel	W 66–51	1–0	The Pavilion; Philadelphia, Pennsylvania
Nov 24, 1985*		Vermont	W 101–61	2–0	The Pavilion; Philadelphia, Pennsylvania
Nov 26, 1985*		at Lamar	L 59–78	2–1	Montagne Center; Beaumont, Texas
Nov 29, 1985*		vs. No. 16 UNLV; Great Alaska Shootout	L 49–61	2–2	Sullivan Arena; Anchorage, Alaska
Nov 30, 1985*		vs. UTSA; Great Alaska Shootout	W 67–56	3–2	Sullivan Arena; Anchorage, Alaska
Dec 1, 1985*		at Alaska-Anchorage; Great Alaska Shootout	W 71–52	4–2	Sullivan Arena; Anchorage, Alaska
Dec 4, 1985*		at La Salle	W 50–46	5–2	The Palestra; Philadelphia, Pennsylvania
Dec 7, 1985*		Wagner	W 85–62	6–2	The Pavilion; Philadelphia, Pennsylvania
Dec 14, 1985*		vs. Temple	L 73–81	6–3	The Palestra; Philadelphia, Pennsylvania
Dec 21, 1985*		vs. Saint Joseph's	L 61–63	6–4	The Palestra; Philadelphia, Pennsylvania
Dec 27, 1985*		vs. Missouri; Rainbow Classic	L 53–72	6–5	Neal S. Blaisdell Center; Honolulu, Hawaii
Dec 28, 1985*		vs. Bradley; Rainbow Classic	L 56–58 ^{OT}	6–6	Neal S. Blaisdell Center; Honolulu, Hawaii
Dec 29, 1985*		at Hawaii; Rainbow Classic	W 76–61	7–6	Neal S. Blaisdell Center; Honolulu, Hawaii
Big East Regular Season
Jan 2, 1986		at Seton Hall	W 62–56	8–6 (1–0)	Brendan Byrne Arena; East Rutherford, New Jersey
Jan 4, 1986*		Marist	W 87–71	9–6	The Pavilion; Philadelphia, Pennsylvania
Jan 6, 1986		No. 4 Syracuse	L 72–77	9–7 (1–1)	The Pavilion; Philadelphia, Pennsylvania
Jan 11, 1986		at Providence	W 78–77 ^{2OT}	10–7 (2–1)	Dunkin' Donuts Center; Providence, Rhode Island
Jan 13, 1986		at Connecticut	W 68–59	11–7 (3–1)	Hartford Civic Center; Storrs, Connecticut
Jan 18, 1986		Pittsburgh	W 74–70	12–7 (4–1)	The Pavilion; Philadelphia, Pennsylvania
Jan 20, 1986		at No. 12 Georgetown	L 72–76	12–8 (4–2)	Capital Centre; Landover, Maryland
Jan 25, 1986		Providence	W 80–68	13–8 (5–2)	The Pavilion; Philadelphia, Pennsylvania
Jan 27, 1986*		at Penn	W 68–64	14–8	The Palestra; Philadelphia, Pennsylvania
Jan 29, 1986		at No. 7 St. John's	L 61–81	14–9 (5–3)	Madison Square Garden; New York, New York
Feb 4, 1986		at Boston College	W 67–57	15–9 (6–3)	Roberts Center; Boston, Massachusetts
Feb 6, 1986*		Maryland	W 64–62	16–9	The Pavilion; Philadelphia, Pennsylvania
Feb 7, 1986		at Pittsburgh	L 71–85	16–10 (6–4)	Fitzgerald Field House; Pittsburgh, Pennsylvania
Feb 9, 1986		Connecticut	W 59–53	17–10 (7–4)	The Pavilion; Philadelphia, Pennsylvania
Feb 12, 1986		at No. 12 Syracuse	L 57–80	17–11 (7–5)	Carrier Dome; Syracuse, New York
Feb 15, 1986		No. 9 Georgetown	W 90–88 ^{2OT}	18–11 (8–5)	The Spectrum; Philadelphia, Pennsylvania
Feb 18, 1986		No. 6 St. John's	L 76–79	18–12 (8–6)	The Pavilion; Philadelphia, Pennsylvania
Feb 22, 1986		Seton Hall	W 78–65	19–12 (9–6)	The Pavilion; Philadelphia, Pennsylvania
Feb 25, 1986*		Monmouth	W 85–52	20–12	The Pavilion; Philadelphia, Pennsylvania
Mar 1, 1986		Boston College	W 74–63	21–12 (10–6)	The Pavilion; Philadelphia, Pennsylvania
Big East tournament
Mar 5, 1986*		vs. Providence; Quarterfinals	W 75–63	22–12	Madison Square Garden; New York, New York
Mar 7, 1986*		at No. 5 St. John's; Semifinals	L 64–75	22–13	Madison Square Garden; New York, New York
NCAA tournament
Mar 13, 1986*	(10 SE)	vs. (7 SE) Virginia Tech; First Round	W 71–62	23–13	LSU Assembly Center; Baton Rouge, Louisiana
Mar 15, 1986*	(10 SE)	vs. (2 SE) No. 6 Georgia Tech; Second Round	L 61–66	23–14	LSU Assembly Center; Baton Rouge, Louisiana
*Non-conference game. ^{#}Rankings from AP Poll. (#) Tournament seedings in parentheses. SE=Southeast.

== Players in the 1986 NBA draft ==
Round	Pick	Player	NBA club
1	17	Harold Pressley	Sacramento Kings
