= Jason Forte =

American basketball player (born 1982)

Personal information
- Born: December 29, 1982 (age 43) Atlanta, Georgia, U.S.
- Listed height: 6 ft 0 in (1.83 m)
- Listed weight: 165 lb (75 kg)

Career information
- High school: DeMatha Catholic (Hyattsville, Maryland); The Heights School (Potomac, Maryland)
- College: Brown (2001–2005)
- NBA draft: 2005: undrafted
- Playing career: 2008–2008
- Position: Point guard

Career history
- 2008: Marinos de Anzoátegui

Career highlights
- Ivy League Player of the Year (2004); 3× First-team All-Ivy League (2003–2005)

Jason A. Forte (born December 29, 1982) is an American former basketball player. He played college basketball for the Brown Bears and was selected as the Ivy League Player of the Year in 2004.

== Early life ==
Forte moved with his mother and older brother, Joseph, from Atlanta, Georgia, to Greenbelt, Maryland, as a child. He started his basketball career at DeMatha Catholic High School in Hyattsville, Maryland, where he played alongside his brother for two seasons. On January 5, 1999, Forte and teammate Keith Bogans were suspended for 10 games due to a fight in a locker room that injured a school trainer. He transferred to The Heights School for the 2000–01 season and led the team to their best start in school history. He committed to play college basketball at Brown University.

== College career ==
Forte moved into the Bears' starting line-up as a point guard during his freshman season in 2001–02. He improved his jump shot and on-court discipline during his sophomore season to become "the best point guard in the league," according to Bears head coach Glen Miller. Forte registered 155 assists during the 2002–03 season to surpass the previous Bears record of 150 that was held by Mike Waitkus. He also led the Ivy League in steals and free throws. Forte was selected to the All-Ivy League first-team.

Forte averaged 16.8 points, a league-leading 5 assists and 1.8 steals per game during the 2003–04 season. On February 27, 2004, he recorded the first triple-double in Bears history with 11 points, 10 assists and 12 rebounds in a game against the Dartmouth Big Green. Forte was awarded as the Ivy League Player of the Year and was a unanimous selection to the All-Ivy League first-team.

On November 13, 2004, Forte was suspended indefinitely by the Bears for "behavior detrimental to the team." The suspension stemmed from an altercation that occurred during a preseason practice. The suspension was only expected to last a couple of weeks, and he ultimately missed two games. Forte averaged a team-best 18.4 points per game during the 2004–05 season, and was selected to the All-Ivy League first-team. He was the third Bears player to accomplish three consecutive selections to the all-league first-team.

In Bears program history, Forte ranks first in steals (192), second in three throws (538), third in assists (514), fourth in points (1,597) and tenth in field goals (469).

Forte was inducted into the Brown University Athletics Hall of Fame in 2016.

== Professional career ==
In the 2005–06 season, Forte had a pre-season stint with Agricola Gloria Montecatini in Italy and later briefly joined Śląsk Wrocław in Poland but did not play.

In March 2008, Forte joined Marinos de Anzoátegui of the Venezuelan Liga Profesional de Baloncesto. In four games, he averaged 11.5 points, 2.8 rebounds, 3.8 assists and 2.3 steals per game.
