= 1985–86 Brown Bears men's basketball team =

American college basketball season

1985–86 Brown Bears men's basketball

Ivy League champions

NCAA tournament
- Conference: Ivy League
- Record: 16–11 (10–4 Ivy)
- Head coach: Mike Cingiser
- Home arena: Marvel Gymnasium

1985–86 Ivy League men's basketball standings
	Conf.				Overall
Team	W		L	PCT	W		L	PCT
Brown	10	–	4	.714	16	–	11	.593
Penn	9	–	5	.643	15	–	11	.577
Cornell	9	–	5	.643	14	–	12	.538
Princeton	7	–	7	.500	13	–	13	.500
Yale	7	–	7	.500	13	–	13	.500
Columbia	6	–	8	.429	12	–	14	.462
Dartmouth	6	–	8	.429	11	–	15	.423
Harvard	2	–	12	.143	6	–	20	.231
Rankings from AP Poll

The 1985–86 Brown Bears men's basketball team represented Brown University during the 1985–86 NCAA Division I men's basketball season. The Bears, led by head coach Mike Cingiser, played their home games at the Marvel Gymnasium and were members of the Ivy League. They finished the season 16–11, 10–4 in Ivy League play to win the league championship and an automatic bid to the NCAA tournament. As No. 15 seed in the East region, the Bears were defeated by No. 2 seed Syracuse, 101–52, in the opening round. To date, this is Brown University's only Ivy League championship and most recent appearance in the NCAA Tournament.

== Roster ==
1985–86 Brown Bears men's basketball team
Players
Coaches

Pos.	#	Name	Height	Weight	Year	Previous school	Hometown
SG	22	Darren Brady	5 ft 10 in (1.78 m)	—	Sr
PG	24	Mike Waitkus	6 ft 2 in (1.88 m)	—	Sr
F	33	Patrick Lynch	6 ft 5 in (1.96 m)	—	Jr	St. Raphael Academy	Pawtucket, Rhode Island
C	40	Jim Turner	6 ft 9 in (2.06 m)	—	Sr	Sewanhaka HS	Levittown, New York
F	41	Todd Murray	6 ft 6 in (1.98 m)	—	Jr

Head coach

- Mike Cingiser (Brown)

Assistant coach(es)

Legend

- (C) Team captain
- (S) Suspended
- (I) Ineligible
- (W) Walk-on
- Injured
- Current redshirt

Roster

== Schedule and results ==
Date time, TV	Rank^{#}	Opponent^{#}	Result	Record	Site (attendance) city, state
Non-conference regular season
Nov 23, 1985*		New Hampshire	L 60–63	0–1	Marvel Gym; Providence, Rhode Island
Nov 26, 1985*		Hofstra	L 77–85	0–2	Marvel Gym; Providence, Rhode Island
Nov 30, 1985*		Rhode Island	W 88–86	1–2	Marvel Gym; Providence, Rhode Island
Dec 3, 1985*		Fairfield	L 67–69	1–3	Marvel Gym; Providence, Rhode Island
Dec 4, 1985*		at Providence	L 80–107	1–4	Providence Civic Center; Providence, Rhode Island
Dec ?, 1985*		Keene State	W 83–51	2–4	Marvel Gym; Providence, Rhode Island
Dec 27, 1985*		at Miami (FL)	W 62–61	3–4	Knight Center; Miami, Florida
Dec 28, 1985*		vs. No. 1 North Carolina	L 63–115	3–5	Knight Center; Miami, Florida
Jan 2, 1986*		vs. American	W 90–85 ^{OT}	4–5	Brendan Byrne Arena; East Rutherford, New Jersey
Jan 7, 1986*		vs. Manhattan	W 87–57	5–5	Brendan Byrne Arena; East Rutherford, New Jersey
Dec ?, 1985*		Bryant	W 71–55	6–5	Marvel Gym; Providence, Rhode Island
Ivy League regular season
Jan 13, 1986		Yale	W 68–65	7–5 (1–0)	Marvel Gym; Providence, Rhode Island
Jan 17, 1986		at Columbia	W 67–61	8–5 (2–0)	Levien Gymnasium; New York, New York
Jan 18, 1986		at Cornell	W 64–62	9–5 (3–0)	Barton Hall; Ithaca, New York
Jan 23, 1986*		Seton Hall	L 54–83	9–6	Marvel Gym; Providence, Rhode Island
Jan 25, 1986		at Yale	L 70–73	9–7 (3–1)	Payne Whitney Gymnasium; New Haven, Connecticut
Jan 31, 1986		Dartmouth	W 76–74	10–7 (4–1)	Marvel Gym; Providence, Rhode Island
Feb 1, 1986		Harvard	W 67–46	11–7 (5–1)	Marvel Gym; Providence, Rhode Island
Feb 7, 1986		at Penn	W 76–72	12–7 (6–1)	The Palestra; Philadelphia, Pennsylvania
Feb 8, 1986		at Princeton	L 53–54	12–8 (6–2)	Jadwin Gymnasium; Princeton, New Jersey
Feb 14, 1986		Cornell	L 58–61	12–9 (6–3)	Marvel Gym; Providence, Rhode Island
Feb 15, 1986		Columbia	W 97–95	13–9 (7–3)	Marvel Gym; Providence, Rhode Island
Feb 21, 1986		Princeton	W 76–65	14–9 (8–3)	Marvel Gym; Providence, Rhode Island
Feb 22, 1986		Penn	L 89–95	14–10 (8–4)	Marvel Gym; Providence, Rhode Island
Feb 28, 1986		at Harvard	W 88–78	15–10 (9–4)	Lavietes Pavilion; Cambridge, Massachusetts
Mar 1, 1986		at Dartmouth	W 82–51	16–10 (10–4)	Alumni Gym; Hanover, New Hampshire
NCAA Tournament
Mar 14, 1986*	(15 E)	vs. (2 E) No. 9 Syracuse; First Round	L 52–101	16–11	Carrier Dome; Syracuse, New York
*Non-conference game. ^{#}Rankings from AP Poll. (#) Tournament seedings in parentheses. All times are in Eastern Time.

== Awards and honors ==
- Jim Turner – Ivy League Player of the Year
