= Gerry Alaimo =

American basketball player and coach

Biographical details
- Born: Torrington, Connecticut, U.S.
- Died: May 10, 2018 (aged 82); Providence, Rhode Island, U.S.

Playing career
- 1955–1958: Brown
- Position: Center

Coaching career (HC unless noted)
- 1963–1964: Brown (Freshmen)
- 1964–1969: Middlebury
- 1969–1978: Brown

Administrative career (AD unless noted)
- 1978–1983: Providence (Dir. of intramurals)
- 1983–1995: Providence (Asst. AD)
- 1995–2001: Providence (Sr. Assoc. AD)

Head coaching record
- Overall: 88–145 (.378) (NCAA Division I); 21–91 (.188) (NCAA Division III)

Accomplishments and honors

Awards
- As player All Ivy League (1957–58); J. Richmond Fales Trophy (1958)

James Gerald Alaimo was an American basketball player and coach at Brown University and an administrator at Providence College.

== Playing ==
A native of Torrington, Connecticut, Alaimo played Center for the Brown Bears men's basketball varsity basketball team from 1955 to 1958. Over three seasons, he averaged 14.1 points and 11.8 rebounds per game. He scored a then school record 38 points in an upset victory over Penn his junior season. His 26 rebounds in a game against Rhode Island the following season remains the second highest total in school history. His senior year, he was a named co-captain, was selected to the All-Ivy League team, and was awarded the J. Richmond Fales Trophy as the team's most valuable player. He graduated as the school's second all-time rebounder and third leading scorer. After graduating, Alaimo served in the United States Army and worked in the insurance industry.

== Coaching ==
In 1963, Alaimo returned to Brown as freshman basketball coach. From 1964 to 1969, he was the men's basketball coach at Middlebury College, where he compiled a 21–91 record. His best season came in 1968–69, when his team went 10–14. In 1969, he was appointed varsity basketball coach at Brown. The Bears had winning records in 1972–73, 1973–74, and 1974–75 – the first time that Brown had ever had three straight winning seasons. Their 17 wins in 1973–74 was a school record. Going into the 1977–78 season, Brown had suffered two consecutive losing seasons and lost four of their five expected starters (two to injury and two to academic issues). On February 28, 1978, with the Bears in last place in the Ivy League, Alaimo resigned effective at the end of the season. His overall record at Brown was 88–145.

== Administrator ==
After leaving Brown, Alaimo was named director of intramurals and recreation at Providence College by athletic director Dave Gavitt. In 1983, Gavitt's successor, Lou Lamoriello, promoted Alaimo to assistant athletics director. From 1995 until his retirement in 2001, he was the school's senior associate athletics director.

== Honors and death ==
Alaimo was inducted into Brown’s Athletic Hall of Fame in 1974 and was named to Brown's All-Time Team at the 100th anniversary celebration in 2006. In 2004, he received the Bill Cawley Award from Words Unlimited, the Rhode Island association of sportswriters and sportscasters. In 2011, he was inducted into the Providence College Athletics Hall of Fame.

Alaimo died on May 10, 2018 in Providence, Rhode Island at the age of 82.
