= 1985–86 Georgetown Hoyas men's basketball team =

American college basketball season

1985–86 Georgetown Hoyas men's basketball

NCAA tournament, second round
- Conference: Big East Conference

Ranking
- Coaches: No. 15
- AP: No. 13
- Record: 24–8 (11–5 Big East)
- Head coach: John Thompson (14th season)
- Assistant coaches: Craig Esherick (4th season); Mike Riley (4th season)
- Captains: Ralph Dalton; Michael Jackson
- Home arena: Capital Centre

1985–86 Big East men's basketball standings
	Conf.				Overall
Team	W		L	PCT	W		L	PCT
No. 4 St. John's †	14	–	2	.875	31	–	5	.861
No. 9 Syracuse	14	–	2	.875	26	–	6	.813
No. 13 Georgetown	11	–	5	.688	24	–	8	.750
Villanova	10	–	6	.625	23	–	14	.622
Providence	7	–	9	.438	17	–	14	.548
Pittsburgh	6	–	10	.375	15	–	14	.517
Boston College	4	–	12	.250	13	–	15	.464
Connecticut	3	–	13	.188	12	–	16	.429
Seton Hall	3	–	13	.188	14	–	18	.438
† 1986 Big East tournament winner As of March 31, 1986; Rankings from AP Poll

The 1985–86 Georgetown Hoyas men's basketball team represented Georgetown University in the 1985–86 NCAA Division I college basketball season. John Thompson, coached them in his 14th season as head coach. They played their home games at the Capital Centre in Landover, Maryland. They were members of the Big East Conference and finished the season with a record of 24–8, 11–5 in Big East play. They advanced to the 1986 Big East men's basketball tournament semifinals before losing to Syracuse and to the second round of the 1986 NCAA Division I men's basketball tournament before losing to Michigan State. They were ranked No. 13 in the season's final Associated Press Poll and No. 15 in the final Coaches' Poll.

== Season recap ==
By the mid-1980s, slow-down games in which weaker teams attempted to control the ball for long stretches without shooting as a way of evening their odds against larger and faster teams had become common enough in men's college basketball to prompt the National Collegiate Athletic Association (NCAA) to adopt a shot clock in men' basketball this season to force a return to quicker and higher-scoring play. Initially a 45-second clock, it would be reduced to 35 seconds in the 1993–94 season.

The new shot clock was not the only major change that the 1985–86 Hoyas faced: They also played the first season of the post-Patrick Ewing era at Georgetown, and the graduation of the dominant center – as well as of forward Bill Martin – in May 1985 required adjustments by a team that had become accustomed to Ewing's stellar offensive and defensive performances.

Junior forward Reggie Williams and senior forward David Wingate were the team's top scoring threats, combining to lead the Hoyas in scoring in 28 of the season's 32 games. Williams scored in double figures in 31 games, including 30 points against 18th-ranked DePaul, 25 points against 10th-ranked St. John's, 22 points and 14 rebounds in Georgetown's first meeting with Villanova, and 26 points and 12 rebounds in the second game against Villanova. He shot 53% from the field and led his team with 17.6 points per game. Wingate, who had played much of his first two seasons at guard but moved to small forward this year, played nearly 1,000 minutes without ever fouling out, and tied his career high with 26 points against Pittsburgh in the last home game of his Georgetown career. He finished the year second to Williams in scoring, averaging 15.9 points per game.

Senior guard Horace Broadnax had seen limited playing time as a reserve and scored in double figures in a combined 18 games during the previous three seasons, but Wingate's move to forward this season allowed him to become a starter for the first time. As such, he had his best season as a Hoya, with 13 points in 17 minutes against Providence, 16 points against seventh-ranked Louisiana State, 15 points against Connecticut, and 17 points against Boston College. Although he averaged only 20 minutes per game, he was fourth in both scoring and assists for the season, and averaged 7.5 points per game.

Senior guard and team co-captain Michael Jackson provided leadership to the team all season. During the final ten games of the regular season, he averaged 11 points and 6.4 assists a game and shot a perfect 30-for-30 from the free-throw line as Georgetown won seven of the games and lost the other three by a combined total of only five points. Overall, he shot 50% from the field and 81% from the free-throw line during the season and had 200 assists. He finished his collegiate career as the leader in Georgetown history in assists, with 671.

Freshman guard Charles Smith joined the team this season. He had a season-high 11 points against Seton Hall, but saw limited playing time, averaging eight minutes and 3.0 points per game. He would emerge late the following season as one of Georgetown's top players. Freshman forward Jaren Jackson was another newcomer. Limited to reserve duty, he came off the bench to lead the team in scoring in three games, but scored half his 102 points for the season in those three games, averaging only 3.2 points per game for the year. His breakout season would come in his junior year.

Sophomore guard Perry McDonald was hobbled by a back injury all season and averaged only 3.4 points per game. Like Smith, he would begin to make his mark as one of the Hoya greats the following year.

The Hoyas' record earned them a bye in the first round of the 1986 Big East men's basketball tournament. In the quarterfinals, they squeaked past Pittsburgh with a one-point win in which Wingate's defense was key to pulling out the victory. They thus advanced to the tournament semifinals, where they lost to Syracuse.

Georgetown was the No. 4 seed in the Midwest Region of the 1986 NCAA Division I men's basketball tournament – the eighth of 14 consecutive Georgetown NCAA tournament appearances – and defeated Texas Tech in the first round to advance to the second round, in which the Hoyas met the Midwest Region's No. 5 seed, Michigan State. Although he had nine of Georgetown's 17 assists, Michael Jackson shot only 1-for-7 (14.3%) from the field while Michigan State senior guard Scott Skiles scored 24 points to lead the Spartans to an 80–68 upset win and bring the Hoyas' season to an end.

David Wingate graduated in May 1986 as the third-highest scorer in Georgetown history, having been the runner-up in scoring in each of his four seasons on the team. During his four years, Georgetown had posted a record of 115–24 (.827), and during the final three years of his collegiate career the Hoyas had lost a combined total of only four home games.

The 1985-86 Hoyas were ranked No. 13 in the season's final Associated Press Poll and No. 15 in the final Coaches' Poll.

== Roster ==
#	Name	Height	Weight (lbs.)	Position	Class	Hometown	Previous Team(s)
4	Bobby Winston	6'5"	N/A	G/F	Fr.	Washington, DC, U.S.	All Saints HS
10	Perry McDonald	6'4"	190	F/G	So.	New Orleans, LA, U.S.	George Washington Carver Senior HS
13	Charles Smith	6'0"	160	G	Fr.	Washington, DC, U.S.	All Saints HS
21	Jaren Jackson	6'2"	190	F	Fr.	New Orleans, LA, U.S.	Walter L. Cohen HS
30	Michael Jackson	6'2"	175	G	Sr.	Reston, VA, U.S.	South Lakes HS
32	Horace Broadnax	6'0"	190	G	Sr.	Plant City, FL, U.S.	Plant City HS
34	Reggie Williams	6'7"	190	F	Jr.	Baltimore, MD, U.S.	Paul Laurence Dunbar HS
40	David Wingate	6'5"	185	F	Sr.	Baltimore, MD, U.S.	Paul Laurence Dunbar HS
42	Johnathan Edwards	6'9"	240	F	Fr.	New Orleans, LA, U.S.	O. Perry Walker HS
44	Ronnie Highsmith	6'8"	N/A	F	So.	Robersonville, NC, U.S.	United States Army
51	Grady Mateen	6'11"	N/A	C	So.	Akron, OH, U.S.	Central-Hower HS
52	Ralph Dalton	6'9"	N/A	C	Grad. Stud.	Suitland, MD, U.S.	Fishburne Military School (Va.)
55	Victor Morris	6'9"	N/A	F	Jr.	Houston, TX, U.S.	Kashmere HS

== Rankings ==
Ranking movement Legend: ██ Improvement in ranking. ██ Decrease in ranking. ██ Not ranked the previous week. RV=Others receiving votes.
Poll	Pre	Wk 1	Wk 2	Wk 3	Wk 4	Wk 5	Wk 6	Wk 7	Wk 8	Wk 9	Wk 10	Wk 11	Wk 12	Wk 13	Wk 14	Wk 15	Final
AP	8	8	6	5	5	5	11	13	15	12	12	11	9	13	15	14	13
Coaches	8	– (Note: No Coaches' Poll this week.)	7	7	6	7	11	15	16	12	12	11	11	13	15	15	15

== 1985–86 Schedule and results ==
Sources

- All times are Eastern

Date time, TV	Rank^{#}	Opponent^{#}	Result	Record	Site (attendance) city, state
Regular Season
Sat., Nov. 23, 1985*	No. 8	at Hawaii Loa	W 100–51	1–0	Kailua Gymnasium (823); Kailua, HI
Wed., Nov. 27, 1985*	No. 8	at Hawaii-Hilo	W 91–57	2–0	Civic Auditorium (2,900); Hilo, HI
Tue., Dec. 3, 1985*	No. 6	at George Mason	W 75–63	3–0	Patriot Center (8,188); Fairfax, VA
Fri., Dec. 6, 1985*	No. 6	at Grambling State	W 77–30	4–0	Civic Center (3,294); Monroe, LA
Wed., Dec. 11, 1985*	No. 5	New Mexico	W 76–51	5–0	Capital Centre (5,616); Landover, MD
Sat., Dec. 14, 1985*	No. 5	Florida A&M	W 86–56	6–0	Capital Centre (5,331); Landover, MD
Wed., Dec. 18, 1985*	No. 5	American	W 83–59	7–0	Capital Centre (5,179); Landover, MD
Sat., Dec. 21, 1985*	No. 5	at No. 18 DePaul	W 85–70	8–0	Rosemont Horizon (N/A); Rosemont, IL
Mon., Dec. 23, 1985*	No. 5	Seattle	W 96–57	9–0	Capital Centre (5,023); Landover, MD
Fri., Dec. 27, 1985*	No. 5	at Texas-El Paso	L 64–78	9–1	Special Events Center (12,222); El Paso, TX
Thu., Jan. 2, 1986	No. 11	at Pittsburgh	L 76–80	9–2 (0–1)	Civic Arena (16,046); Pittsburgh, PA
Sat., Jan. 4, 1986	No. 11	Providence	W 110–79	10–2 (1–1)	Capital Centre (6,869); Landover, MD
Wed., Jan. 8, 1986	No. 13	Connecticut; Rivalry	W 70–66	11–2 (2–1)	Capital Centre (6,171); Landover, MD
Sat., Jan. 11, 1986	No. 13	at No. 10 St. John's	L 74–79	11–3 (2–2)	Madison Square Garden (19,591); New York, NY
Wed., Jan. 15, 1986	No. 15	No. 4 Syracuse; Rivalry	W 73–70	12–3 (3–2)	Capital Centre (18,164); Landover, MD
Sat., Jan. 18, 1986	No. 15	at Seton Hall	W 82–72	13–3 (4–2)	Brendan Byrne Arena (6,712); East Rutherford, NJ
Mon., Jan 20, 1986	No. 15	Villanova	W 76–72	14–3 (5–2)	Capital Centre (11,541); Landover, MD
Sat., Jan. 25, 1986	No. 12	at Boston College	W 73–66	15–3 (6–2)	Boston Garden (14,218); Boston, MA
Mon., Jan. 27, 1986	No. 12	at Providence	W 69–54	16–3 (7–2)	Providence Civic Center (10,561); Providence, RI
Sun., Feb. 2, 1986*	No. 12	No. 17 Louisiana State	W 74–72 ^{OT}	17–3	Capital Centre (11,367); Landover, MD
Wed., Feb. 5, 1986	No. 11	at Connecticut; Rivalry	W 80–63	18–3 (8–2)	Hartford Civic Center (13,838); Hartford, CT
Sat., Feb. 8, 1986	No. 11	Seton Hall	W 81–54	19–3 (9–2)	Capital Centre (6,276); Landover, MD
Mon., Feb. 10, 1986	No. 11	No. 10 St. John's	L 58–60	19–4 (9–3)	Capital Centre (16,093); Landover, MD
Fri., Feb. 15, 1986	No. 9	at Villanova	L 88–90 ^{2OT}	19–5 (9–4)	Spectrum (17,764); Philadelphia, PA
Tue., Feb 18, 1986*	No. 13	at Morgan State	W 81–53	20–5	Baltimore Arena (6,023); Baltimore, MD
Sun., Feb. 23, 1986	No. 13	at No. 9 Syracuse; Rivalry	L 63–64	20–6 (9–5)	Carrier Dome (32,475); Syracuse, NY
Wed., Feb. 26, 1986	No. 15	Boston College	W 90–76	21–6 (10–5)	Capital Centre (8,693); Landover, MD
Tue., Mar. 4, 1986	No. 14	Pittsburgh	W 93–62	22–6 (11–5)	Capital Centre (10,742); Landover, MD
Big East tournament
Thu., Mar. 6, 1986	(3) No. 14	vs. (6) Pittsburgh; Quarterfinals	W 57–56	23–6	Madison Square Garden (19,591); New York, NY
Fri., Mar. 7, 1986	(3) No. 14	vs. (2) No. 8 Syracuse; Semifinals/Rivalry	L 73–75 ^{OT}	23–7	Madison Square Garden (19,591); New York, NY
NCAA Tournament
Wed., Mar. 12, 1986	(4 MW) No. 13	vs. (13 MW) Texas Tech; First round	W 70–64	24–7	University of Dayton Arena (11,260); Dayton, OH
Fri., Mar. 14, 1986	(4 MW) No. 13	vs. (5 MW) No. 18 Michigan State; Second round	L 68–80	24–8	University of Dayton Arena (11,260); Dayton, OH
*Non-conference game. ^{#}Rankings from AP Poll. (#) Tournament seedings in parentheses.
