= 1985–86 Pittsburgh Panthers men's basketball team =

American college basketball season

1985–86 Pittsburgh Panthers men's basketball

NIT, First Round, L 52–59 vs. SW Missouri State
- Conference: Big East Conference (1979–2013)
- Record: 15–14 (6–10 Big East)
- Head coach: Roy Chipman (6th season)
- Assistant coaches: Reggie Warford (6th season); Joe DeGregorio (3rd season); John Calipari (1st season)
- Home arena: Fitzgerald Field House (Capacity: 4,122)

1985–86 Big East men's basketball standings
	Conf.				Overall
Team	W		L	PCT	W		L	PCT
No. 4 St. John's †	14	–	2	.875	31	–	5	.861
No. 9 Syracuse	14	–	2	.875	26	–	6	.813
No. 13 Georgetown	11	–	5	.688	24	–	8	.750
Villanova	10	–	6	.625	23	–	14	.622
Providence	7	–	9	.438	17	–	14	.548
Pittsburgh	6	–	10	.375	15	–	14	.517
Boston College	4	–	12	.250	13	–	15	.464
Connecticut	3	–	13	.188	12	–	16	.429
Seton Hall	3	–	13	.188	14	–	18	.438
† 1986 Big East tournament winner As of March 31, 1986; Rankings from AP Poll

The 1985–86 Pittsburgh Panthers men's basketball team represented the University of Pittsburgh in the 1985–86 NCAA Division I men's basketball season. Led by head coach Roy Chipman, the Panthers finished with a record of 15–14. They were invited to the 1986 National Invitation Tournament, where they lost in the first round to SW Missouri State.
