= 1985–86 Connecticut Huskies men's basketball team =

American college basketball season

1985–86 Connecticut Huskies men's basketball
- Conference: Big East Conference
- Record: 12–16 (3–13 Big East)
- Head coach: Dom Perno (9th season)
- Assistant coaches: Greg Ashford; Howie Dickenman; Steve Siegrist
- Home arena: Hugh S. Greer Field House; Hartford Civic Center

1985–86 Big East men's basketball standings
	Conf.				Overall
Team	W		L	PCT	W		L	PCT
No. 4 St. John's †	14	–	2	.875	31	–	5	.861
No. 9 Syracuse	14	–	2	.875	26	–	6	.813
No. 13 Georgetown	11	–	5	.688	24	–	8	.750
Villanova	10	–	6	.625	23	–	14	.622
Providence	7	–	9	.438	17	–	14	.548
Pittsburgh	6	–	10	.375	15	–	14	.517
Boston College	4	–	12	.250	13	–	15	.464
Connecticut	3	–	13	.188	12	–	16	.429
Seton Hall	3	–	13	.188	14	–	18	.438
† 1986 Big East tournament winner As of March 31, 1986; Rankings from AP Poll

The 1985–86 Connecticut Huskies men's basketball team represented the University of Connecticut in the 1985–86 collegiate men's basketball season. The Huskies completed the season with a 12–16 overall record. The Huskies were members of the Big East Conference where they finished with a 3–13 record. The Huskies played their home games at Hugh S. Greer Field House in Storrs, Connecticut and the Hartford Civic Center in Hartford, Connecticut, and they were led by ninth-year head coach Dom Perno.

== Schedule ==
Date time, TV	Rank^{#}	Opponent^{#}	Result	Record	Site (attendance) city, state
Regular Season
11/26/1985*		Yale	W 80–76	1–0	Hugh S. Greer Field House; Storrs, Connecticut
11/30/1985*		Saint Peter's	W 53–40	2–0	Hugh S. Greer Field House; Storrs, Connecticut
12/4/1985*		at Massachusetts	W 78–70	3–0	Curry Hicks Cage; Amherst, Massachusetts
12/7/1985*		Boston University	W 89–76	4–0	Hugh S. Greer Field House; Storrs, Connecticut
12/10/1985*		at Fairfield	W 74–72	5–0	Alumni Hall; Fairfield, Connecticut
12/14/1985*		at Rhode Island	W 55–42	6–0	Keaney Gymnasium; Kingston, Rhode Island
12/21/1985*		Minnesota	W 70–69	7–0	Hartford Civic Center; Hartford, Connecticut
12/27/1985*		St. Francis (NY); Connecticut Mutual Classic	W 84–61	8–0	Hartford Civic Center; Hartford, Connecticut
12/28/1985*		Northeastern; Connecticut Mutual Classic	L 73–90	8–1	Hartford Civic Center; Hartford, Connecticut
1/4/1986		at Boston College	L 60–61	8–2 (0–1)	Roberts Center; Boston, Massachusetts
1/8/1986		at Georgetown; Rivalry	L 66–70	8–3 (0–2)	Capital Centre; Landover, Maryland
1/11/1986		Boston College	W 80–69	9–3 (1–2)	Hugh S. Greer Field House; Storrs, Connecticut
1/13/1986		Villanova	L 59–68	9–4 (1–3)	Hartford Civic Center; Hartford, Connecticut
1/18/1986		St. John's	L 60–61	9–5 (1–4)	Hartford Civic Center; Hartford, Connecticut
1/21/1986		Seton Hall	W 82–70	10–5 (2–4)	Hugh S. Greer Field House; Storrs, Connecticut
1/25/1986		at Syracuse; Rivalry	L 67–80	10–6 (2–5)	Carrier Dome; Syracuse, New York
1/29/1986*		Central Connecticut	W 86–69	11–6	Hugh S. Greer Field House; Storrs, Connecticut
2/5/1986		Georgetown; Rivalry	L 63–80	11–7 (2–6)	Hartford Civic Center; Hartford, Connecticut
2/9/1986		at Villanova	L 53–59	11–8 (2–7)	Jake Nevin Field House; Villanova, Pennsylvania
2/11/1986		Pittsburgh	W 77–73	12–8 (3–7)	Hugh S. Greer Field House; Storrs, Connecticut
2/13/1986*		at Holy Cross	L 70–73	12–9	Hart Center; Worcester, Massachusetts
2/15/1986		at St. John's	L 54–74	12–10 (3–8)	Carnesecca Arena; New York City, New York
2/18/1986		at Seton Hall	L 62–65	12–11 (3–9)	Brendan Byrne Arena; East Rutherford, New Jersey
2/22/1986		Providence	L 67–74	12–12 (3–10)	Hartford Civic Center; Hartford, Connecticut
2/24/1986		at Pittsburgh	L 51–79	12–13 (3–11)	Fitzgerald Field House; Pittsburgh, Pennsylvania
2/26/1986		at Providence	L 66–69	12–14 (3–12)	Providence Civic Center; Providence, Rhode Island
3/1/1986		Syracuse; Rivalry	L 68–75	12–15 (3–13)	Hartford Civic Center; Hartford, Connecticut
Big East tournament
3/5/1986		vs. Seton Hall; First Round	L 66–76	12–16	Madison Square Garden; New York City, New York
*Non-conference game. ^{#}Rankings from AP Poll. (#) Tournament seedings in parentheses. All times are in Eastern Time.

Schedule Source:
