= Dwayne Washington (basketball) =

American basketball player (1964–2016)

Personal information
- Born: January 6, 1964 Brooklyn, New York, U.S.
- Died: April 20, 2016 (aged 52) The Bronx, New York, U.S.
- Listed height: 6 ft 2 in (1.88 m)
- Listed weight: 190 lb (86 kg)

Career information
- High school: Boys and Girls (Brooklyn, New York)
- College: Syracuse (1983–1986)
- NBA draft: 1986: 1st round, 13th overall pick
- Drafted by: New Jersey Nets
- Playing career: 1986–1991
- Position: Point guard
- Number: 1, 31

Career history
- 1986–1988: New Jersey Nets
- 1988–1989: Miami Heat
- 1989–1990: Rapid City Thrillers
- 1990–1991: San Jose Jammers

Career highlights
- Consensus second-team All-American (1985); Second-team All-American – UPI (1986); Third-team All-American – AP, NABC (1986); 3× First-team All-Big East (1984–1986); No. 31 retired by Syracuse Orange; McDonald's All-American Co-MVP (1983); First-team Parade All-American (1983); Second-team Parade All-American (1982)
- Stats at NBA.com
- Stats at Basketball Reference
Medals
Men's basketball
Representing United States
FIBA U19 World Championship
Gold medal – first place	1983 Palma de Mallorca	National team

Dwayne Alonzo "Pearl" Washington (January 6, 1964 – April 20, 2016) was an American professional basketball player who played in the National Basketball Association (NBA). A 6 ft 2 in (1.88 m), 190 pounds (86 kg) point guard, he was best known for his college career for Syracuse University, where he was an All-American.

== Early life ==
Washington grew up in the Brownsville section of the New York City borough of Brooklyn, where he acquired his nickname as an eight-year-old in a taunting comparison to Earl "the Pearl" Monroe. He was a playground phenomenon from Boys and Girls High School in Brooklyn, and was rated as the number one overall high school player in the United States in 1983.

== College career ==
Washington played college basketball for the Syracuse Orange and the Carrier Dome. "The Pearl" was the master of the "shake and bake", in which he would leave his defensive opposition standing still while he drove by them for a layup. Utah Jazz point guard and NBA Hall of Famer John Stockton named Washington as the toughest player he guarded at the 1984 U.S. Olympic Trials training camp.

== Professional career ==
Washington was drafted by the New Jersey Nets in the first round (13th pick) of the 1986 NBA draft. In two seasons with the Nets he averaged nine points per game.

In 1988 the Miami Heat selected Washington in their expansion draft. He played 54 games for the Heat before being released.

Following Washington's release from Miami, Washington played for the Rapid City Thrillers and San Jose Jammers in the Continental Basketball Association.

== Personal life ==
Washington had surgery on August 27, 2015, at Crouse Hospital in Syracuse to address a malignant brain tumor. He died on April 20, 2016, at the age of 52.

== Career statistics ==
Legend
GP	Games played	GS	Games started	MPG	Minutes per game
FG%	Field goal percentage	3P%	3-point field goal percentage	FT%	Free throw percentage
RPG	Rebounds per game	APG	Assists per game	SPG	Steals per game
BPG	Blocks per game	PPG	Points per game	**Bold**	Career high

=== NBA ===
==== Regular season ====
Year	Team	GP	GS	MPG	FG%	3P%	FT%	RPG	APG	SPG	BPG	PPG
1986–87	New Jersey	**72**	**61**	**22.2**	**.478**	.167	.784	1.8	**4.2**	1.2	**.1**	8.6
1987–88	New Jersey	68	10	20.3	.448	**.224**	.698	1.7	3.0	1.3	**.1**	**9.3**
1988–89	Miami	54	8	19.7	.424	.071	**.788**	**2.3**	**4.2**	**1.4**	**.1**	7.6
Career		194	79	20.8	.452	.184	.746	1.9	3.8	1.3	.1	8.6
