= Rafael Addison =

American basketball player (born 1964)

Personal information
- Born: July 22, 1964 (age 62) Jersey City, New Jersey, U.S.
- Listed height: 6 ft 7 in (2.01 m)
- Listed weight: 215 lb (98 kg)

Career information
- High school: Henry Snyder (Jersey City, New Jersey)
- College: Syracuse (1982–1986)
- NBA draft: 1986: 2nd round, 39th overall pick
- Drafted by: Phoenix Suns
- Playing career: 1986–1997
- Position: Small forward / shooting guard
- Number: 12, 21, 7

Career history
- 1986–1987: Phoenix Suns
- 1987–1991: Pallacanestro Livorno
- 1991–1993: New Jersey Nets
- 1994: Benetton Treviso
- 1994–1995: Detroit Pistons
- 1995–1997: Charlotte Hornets
- 1997: PAOK Thessaloniki

Career highlights
- First-team All-Big East (1985); 2× Second-team All-Big East (1984, 1986)
- Stats at NBA.com
- Stats at Basketball Reference

Rafael Addison (born July 22, 1964) is a retired American professional basketball player who played in the National Basketball Association (NBA) and other leagues. He was listed at 6'7" and 215 lbs.

Addison attended Syracuse University and was drafted in the second round of the 1986 NBA draft by the Phoenix Suns.

He has played professionally in Italy for Allibert Livorno (1987–1991, Serie A2 in 1989–91, also known as Garessio 2000 Livorno and Tombolini Livorno) and Benetton Treviso (1993–94, won the Italian Cup).

== NBA career statistics ==
Legend
GP	Games played	GS	Games started	MPG	Minutes per game
FG%	Field goal percentage	3P%	3-point field goal percentage	FT%	Free throw percentage
RPG	Rebounds per game	APG	Assists per game	SPG	Steals per game
BPG	Blocks per game	PPG	Points per game	**Bold**	Career high

=== Regular season ===
Year	Team	GP	GS	MPG	FG%	3P%	FT%	RPG	APG	SPG	BPG	PPG
1986–87	Phoenix	62	12	11.5	.441	.320	.797	1.7	.7	.4	.1	5.8
1991–92	New Jersey	76	8	15.5	.433	.286	.737	2.2	.9	.4	**.4**	5.8
1992–93	New Jersey	68	15	17.1	.443	.206	**.814**	1.9	.8	.3	.2	6.3
1994–95	Detroit	**79**	**16**	**22.5**	**.476**	.289	.747	**3.1**	**1.4**	**.7**	.3	**8.3**
1995–96	Charlotte	53	0	9.7	.467	.000	.773	1.3	.6	.2	.2	3.2
1996–97	Charlotte	41	3	8.7	.402	**.400**	.786	1.1	.8	.2	.1	3.1
Career		379	54	15.0	.449	.282	.772	2.1	.9	.4	.2	5.8

=== Playoffs ===
Year	Team	GP	GS	MPG	FG%	3P%	FT%	RPG	APG	SPG	BPG	PPG
1991–92	New Jersey	1	0	9.0	.286	**.500**	–	.0	1.0	.0	.0	**5.0**
1992–93	New Jersey	**5**	0	**10.6**	**.333**	–	**1.000**	**1.2**	1.0	**.6**	.0	3.4
Career		6	0	10.3	.321	.500	1.000	1.0	1.0	.5	.0	3.7
