= Walter Berry (basketball) =

American basketball player (born 1964)

Personal information
- Born: May 14, 1964 (age 62) New York City, New York, U.S.
- Listed height: 6 ft 8 in (2.03 m)
- Listed weight: 215 lb (98 kg)

Career information
- High school: Benjamin Franklin (New York City, New York)
- College: San Jacinto (1983–1984); St. John's (1984–1986)
- NBA draft: 1986: 1st round, 14th overall pick
- Drafted by: Portland Trail Blazers
- Playing career: 1986–2002
- Position: Power forward
- Number: 21, 6, 15, 14, 12, 9, 8

Career history
- 1986: Portland Trail Blazers
- 1986–1988: San Antonio Spurs
- 1988–1989: New Jersey Nets
- 1989: Houston Rockets
- 1989–1990: Basket Napoli
- 1990–1991: Atlético Madrid Villalba
- 1991: Aris
- 1992: Basket Napoli
- 1992–1993: Olympiacos
- 1993–1994: PAOK
- 1994–1995: Iraklis
- 1995–1996: Olympiacos
- 1997: Aris
- 1997–1998: Polti Cantù
- 1998–1999: PAOK
- 1999–2000: Union Olimpija
- 2000: Makedonikos
- 2000–2001: Aurora Basket Jesi
- 2001–2002: Panteras de Miranda

Career highlights
- FIBA Saporta Cup Top Scorer (1995); FIBA Korać Cup champion (1994); Liga ACB Top Scorer (1991); 2× Greek League champion (1993, 1996); Greek Cup winner (1999); Greek League Top Scorer (1995); Greek Cup Finals MVP (1999); Greek League Hall of Fame (2022); John R. Wooden Award (1986); Oscar Robertson Trophy (1986); NABC Player of the Year (1986); AP Player of the Year (1986); UPI Player of the Year (1986); Adolph Rupp Trophy (1986); Sporting News Player of the Year (1986); Consensus first-team All-American (1986); Big East Player of the Year (1986); First-team All-Big East (1986); Second-team All-Big East (1985)

Career NBA statistics
- Points: 2,882
- Rebounds: 971
- Assists: 292
- Stats at NBA.com
- Stats at Basketball Reference
Medals
Men's basketball
Representing United States
FIBA U19 World Cup
Gold medal – first place	1983 Palma de Mallorca	Under-19

Walter Berry (born May 14, 1964) is an American former professional basketball player. After spending three seasons in the National Basketball Association (NBA), he had a very successful career in various leagues around Europe and the EuroLeague. Berry played the power forward position. Berry, who originated from New York City, New York, was nicknamed "The Truth", early in his playing career. He was inducted into the Greek Basket League Hall of Fame in 2022.

== College career ==
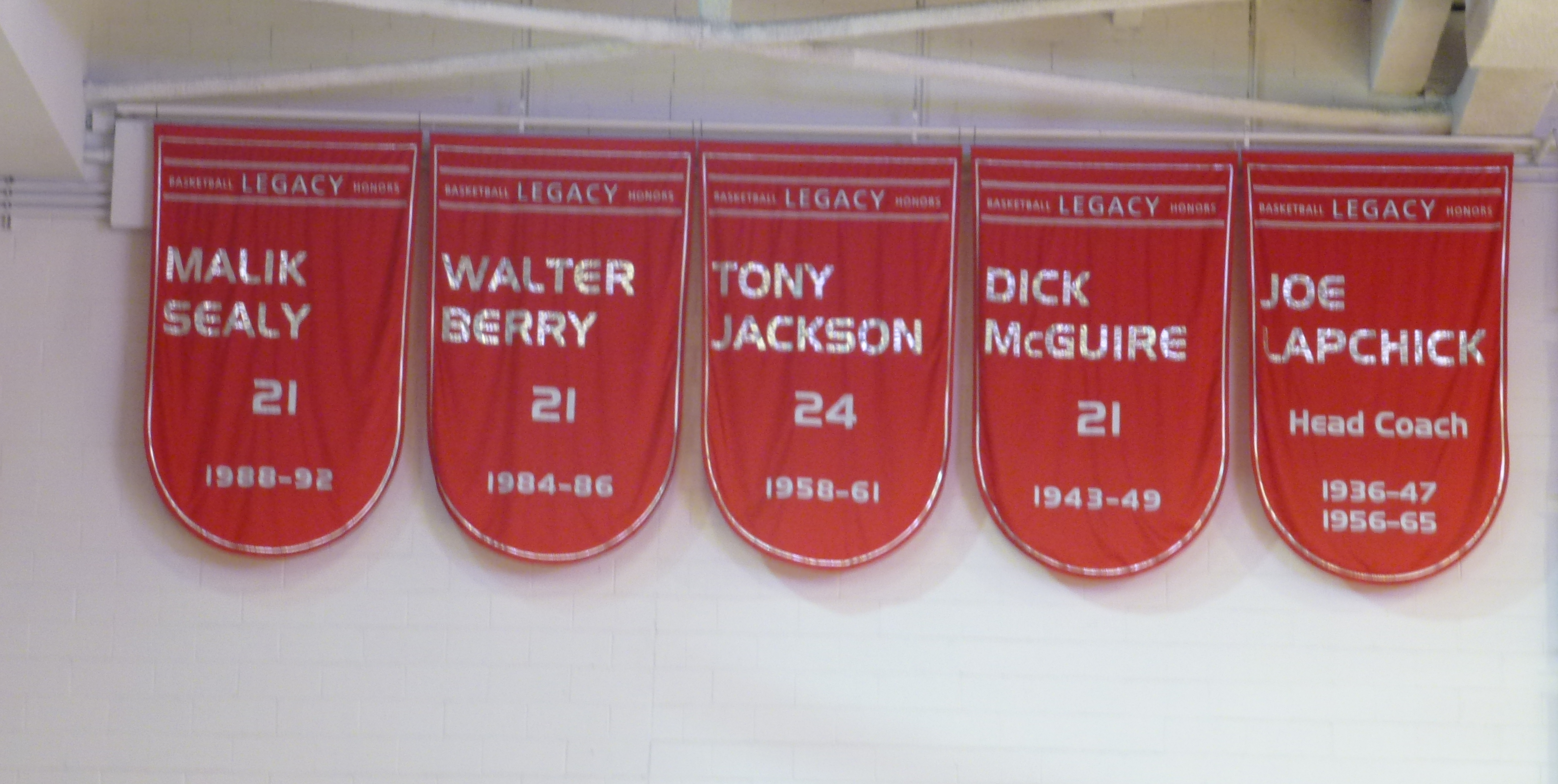
Berry's retired St. John's # 21 jersey.

Berry played college basketball for his hometown college, St. John's University, with the then called St. John's Redmen. At St. John's he won the John Wooden Award, the Big East Men's Basketball Player of the Year award, plus the USBWA College Player of the Year award in 1986, after averaging 23 points and 11.1 rebounds per game. Berry, nicknamed, "The Truth", was also the second leading scorer on St. John's 1985 Final Four team.

== Professional career ==
=== NBA ===
Berry was selected by the Portland Trail Blazers with the 14th overall pick in the 1986 NBA draft. He only played 7 games for the Blazers before he was traded to the San Antonio Spurs in exchange for Kevin Duckworth. He spent three seasons in the NBA, from 1986 to 1989, with the Trail Blazers, Spurs, New Jersey Nets, and Houston Rockets. However, he did not get along with some of his coaches, including Mike Schuler while with the Portland Trail Blazers, Larry Brown (San Antonio Spurs) and Willis Reed (Nets). He was released by the New Jersey Nets, after failure to conform to team policy. He holds NBA career averages of 14.1 points and 4.7 rebounds per game.

=== Europe ===
In 1989, Berry went to Italy, where he played for Italian LBA League club Paini Napoli. After that, he spent much of his career playing in Greece, in the Greek Basket League and the EuroLeague, where he forged a reputation as one of the most savvy scorers, with a wide variety of shots and ways of scoring.

== Later career ==
Berry would continue to play basketball for Jayson Williams' NBA Charity Team. He joined Jayson Williams at the 2002 Winter Olympics in Salt Lake City, where Williams' NBA charity team played exhibition games.

== NBA career statistics ==
Legend
GP	Games played	GS	Games started	MPG	Minutes per game
FG%	Field goal percentage	3P%	3-point field goal percentage	FT%	Free throw percentage
RPG	Rebounds per game	APG	Assists per game	SPG	Steals per game
BPG	Blocks per game	PPG	Points per game	**Bold**	Career high

=== Regular season ===
Year	Team	GP	GS	MPG	FG%	3P%	FT%	RPG	APG	SPG	BPG	PPG
1986–87	Portland	7	0	2.7	**.750**	–	**1.000**	1.0	0.1	0.3	0.0	1.9
1986–87	San Antonio	56	45	**28.0**	.529	.000	.648	**5.4**	**1.9**	0.6	0.7	**17.6**
1987–88	San Antonio	**73**	**56**	26.3	.563	–	.600	**5.4**	1.5	**0.8**	**0.9**	17.4
1988–89	New Jersey	29	17	19.2	.468	–	.683	4.0	0.7	0.3	0.4	8.9
1988–89	Houston	40	14	20.0	.541	**.500**	.713	3.8	1.4	0.5	**0.9**	8.8
Career		205	132	23.7	.539	.200	.638	4.7	1.4	0.6	0.7	14.1

=== Playoffs ===
Year	Team	GP	GS	MPG	FG%	3P%	FT%	RPG	APG	SPG	BPG	PPG
1988	San Antonio	3	0	**31.3**	**.540**	.000	.800	**7.0**	**2.0**	**1.7**	**0.7**	**22.0**
1989	Houston	**4**	0	14.3	.500	–	**.875**	2.3	1.3	0.5	0.3	8.3
Career		7	0	21.6	.526	.000	.826	4.3	1.6	1.0	0.4	14.1
