= Harold Pressley =

American basketball player (born 1963)

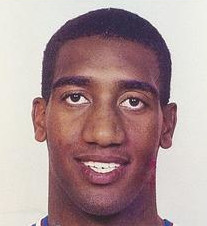
- Pressley, circa 1986

Personal information
- Born: July 14, 1963 (age 63) The Bronx, New York, U.S.
- Listed height: 6 ft 7 in (2.01 m)
- Listed weight: 210 lb (95 kg)

Career information
- High school: Saint Bernard (Uncasville, Connecticut)
- College: Villanova (1982–1986)
- NBA draft: 1986: 1st round, 17th overall pick
- Drafted by: Sacramento Kings
- Playing career: 1986–1995
- Position: Small forward
- Number: 21

Career history

Playing
- 1986–1990: Sacramento Kings
- 1990–1993: Joventut Badalona
- 1993–1994: Pau-Orthez
- 1994–1995: Baloncesto León

Coaching
- 2000–2001: San Diego Wildfire

Career highlights
- Liga ACB champion (1991,1992); NCAA champion (1985); First-team All-Big East (1986); Big East Defensive Player of the Year (1986); Robert V. Geasey Trophy winner (1986); First-team Parade All-American (1982); McDonald's All-American (1982)

Career NBA statistics
- Points: 2,702 (9.0 ppg)
- Rebounds: 1,339 (4.5 rpg)
- Stats at NBA.com
- Stats at Basketball Reference

Harold Pressley (born July 14, 1963) is an American former professional basketball player. He spent four years in the National Basketball Association (NBA) for the Sacramento Kings between 1986 and 1990 before playing a major role in Joventut Badalona's success both in the Spanish league and the Euroleague until 1993.

== College ==
After attending Saint Bernard High School in Uncasville, Connecticut, Pressley played collegiately at Villanova University and was a member of their 1985 National Championship team. At Villanova, he became the first player in Big East history to record a triple-double, with 19 points, 15 rebounds, and 10 blocked shots against Providence. He was named to the 1985 NCAA Southeast Regional All-Tournament Team, the 1986 All Big East First Team, a 1986 Associated Press honorable mention All American, the 1986 Big East All-Tournament Team and the 1986 Big East Defensive Player of the Year.

== Professional career ==
Pressley was selected by the Sacramento Kings in the 1st round (17th overall pick) of the 1986 NBA draft. He played the shooting guard and small forward positions for four years with the Kings, averaging 9.0 points and 4.5 rebounds per game. Seeing fewer opportunities once the Kings hired coach Dick Motta, in 1990 Pressley signed a contract with Joventut Badalona of the Spanish ACB league, winning two consecutive championships in 1991 and 1992 and reaching the 1992 Euroleague final alongside Jordi Villacampa and Corny Thompson. He had 20 points and 9 rebounds against Partizan, but his performance was not enough to prevent a 70–71 loss, highlighted by Sasha Djordjevic' buzzer beater three pointer. In the 1993–94 season, Pressley signed with Pau Orthez in France, before returning to Spain and finishing his career.

== Post athletic career ==
Pressley was a co-host on Sierra Central Sports Roundtable, a sports show that airs every Sunday morning on Comcast Sports Net in the Sacramento area. On March 30, 2007, he began serving as Director of Player Development for the Sacramento Kings. His son Bryce Pressley was a college basketball player at the University of Portland.

== Career statistics ==
Legend
GP	Games played	GS	Games started	MPG	Minutes per game
FG%	Field goal percentage	3P%	3-point field goal percentage	FT%	Free throw percentage
RPG	Rebounds per game	APG	Assists per game	SPG	Steals per game
BPG	Blocks per game	PPG	Points per game	**Bold**	Career high

=== NBA ===
==== Regular season ====
Year	Team	GP	GS	MPG	FG%	3P%	FT%	RPG	APG	SPG	BPG	PPG
1986–87	Sacramento	67	23	13.6	.423	.250	.729	2.6	1.8	.6	.3	4.6
1987–88	Sacramento	**80**	**49**	25.4	**.453**	.327	**.792**	4.6	**2.3**	1.1	.7	9.7
1988–89	Sacramento	**80**	36	**28.2**	.439	**.403**	.780	**6.1**	2.2	**1.2**	**1.0**	**12.3**
1989–90	Sacramento	72	10	22.3	.424	.311	.780	4.3	2.1	.8	.5	8.8
Career		229	118	22.7	.437	.358	.778	4.5	2.1	.9	.6	9.0
