= Brown Bears men's basketball =

Men's college basketball team

Brown Bears
2026–27 Brown Bears men's basketball team
- University: Brown University
- Head coach: Eric Reveno (1st season)
- Location: Providence, Rhode Island
- Arena: Pizzitola Sports Center (capacity: 2,800)
- Conference: Ivy League
- Nickname: Bears
- Colors: Seal brown, cardinal red, and white

NCAA Division I tournament appearances
- 1939, 1986

Conference regular-season champions
- 1986

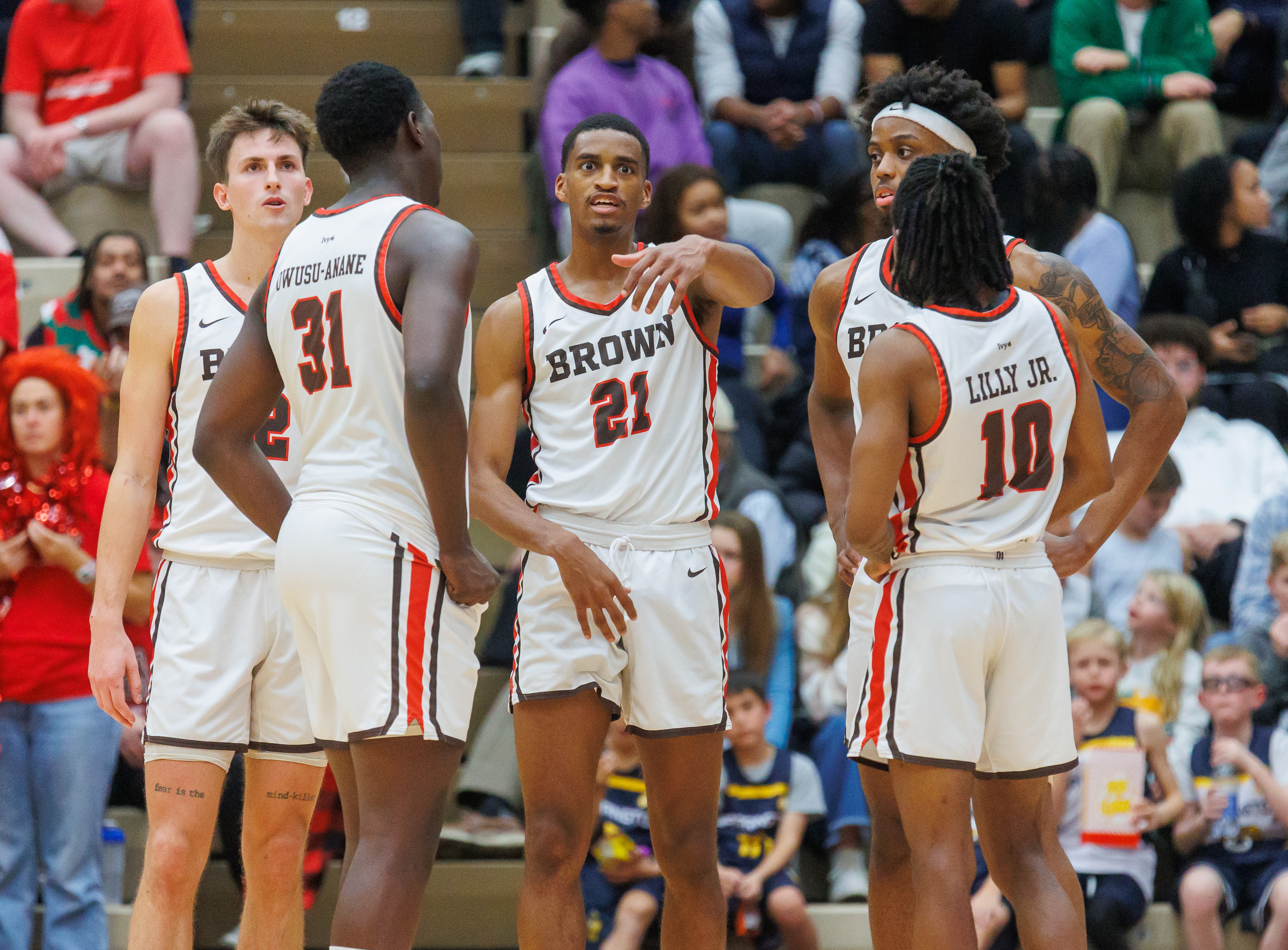
2023 players

The Brown Bears men's basketball team is the basketball team that represents Brown University, located in Providence, Rhode Island. The school's team currently competes in the Ivy League.

== Postseason results ==
=== NCAA tournament results ===
The Brown Bears have appeared in the NCAA Tournament two times, including the inaugural tournament in 1939. Their combined record is 0–2.

Year	Round	Opponent	Result
1939	Quarterfinals	Villanova	L 30–42
1986	First Round	Syracuse	L 52–101

=== NIT results ===
The Brown Bears have appeared in the National Invitation Tournament (NIT) one time. Their record is 0–1.

Year	Round	Opponent	Result
2003	First Round	Virginia	L 73–89

=== CBI results ===
The Brown Bears have appeared in the College Basketball Invitational (CBI) two times. Their combined record is 1–2.

Year	Round	Opponent	Result
2008	First Round	Ohio	L 74–80
2019	First Round; Second Round	UAB; Loyola Marymount	W 83–78; L 61–83

=== CIT results ===
The Brown Bears have appeared in the CollegeInsider.com Postseason Tournament (CIT), one time. Their record is 0–1.

Year	Round	Opponent	Result
2014	First Round	Holy Cross	L 65–68

== See also ==
- Brown Bears men's basketball statistical leaders
