= 1985–86 LSU Tigers basketball team =

American college basketball season

1985–86 LSU Tigers basketball

NCAA tournament, Final Four
- Conference: Southeastern Conference
- Record: 26–12 (9–9 SEC)
- Head coach: Dale Brown (14th season)
- Assistant coaches: Ron Abernathy (10th season); Bo Bahnsen; Johnny Jones (2nd season)
- Home arena: LSU Assembly Center

1985–86 Southeastern Conference men's basketball standings
	Conf.				Overall
Team	W		L	PCT	W		L	PCT
No. 3 Kentucky †	17	–	1	.944	32	–	4	.889
Alabama	13	–	5	.722	24	–	9	.727
Auburn	13	–	5	.722	22	–	11	.667
Florida	10	–	8	.556	19	–	14	.576
LSU	9	–	9	.500	26	–	12	.684
Georgia	9	–	9	.500	17	–	13	.567
Vanderbilt	7	–	11	.389	13	–	15	.464
Tennessee	5	–	13	.278	12	–	16	.429
Ole Miss	4	–	14	.222	12	–	17	.414
Mississippi State	3	–	15	.167	6	–	22	.214
† 1986 SEC tournament winner Rankings from AP Poll

The 1985–86 LSU Tigers basketball team represented Louisiana State University in the Southeastern Conference (SEC) during the 1985–86 NCAA Division I men's basketball season. It is best known for being the lowest seeded team (11th) in the NCAA tournament to reach the Final Four (later matched by George Mason in 2006, VCU in 2011, Loyola Chicago in 2018, UCLA in 2021, and NC State in 2024). They remain the only 11 seed to beat the 1, 2, and 3 seeds in their region in the same tournament.

== Season ==
The team is also remembered for overcoming numerous obstacles during that season. Star forward Jerry Reynolds had left LSU early for the NBA draft. The Tigers originally had two seven-footers and a third player near that height on their roster, but only one was available by the start of the season—6–11 Damon Vance was declared academically ineligible, and 7–1 freshman and future NBA player Tito Horford either left the team or was dismissed, depending on the source. The other seven-footer, Zoran Jovanovich, suffered a season-ending knee injury during the team's Christmas break. Two other players were declared academically ineligible—Dennis Brown, reportedly a solid engineering student, took too few courses in his major and was ruled out for the entire season, and star forward Nikita Wilson failed two courses in the fall semester, ruling him out for the spring semester. As a result of these losses, Ricky Blanton switched positions from guard to center, and team captain Don Redden said at the time that the Tigers had "gone from an NBA-size team to a big junior high team." The team was then hit with a chickenpox outbreak, with star forward John Williams and backup forward Bernard Woodside hospitalized for a week and the team quarantined for several days. LSU was forced to reschedule what was intended to be a nationally televised game against Auburn due to a lack of healthy players, and coach Dale Brown even went so far as to draft football player Chris Carrier as emergency cover.

== Roster ==
1985–86 LSU Tigers men's basketball team
Players
Coaches

Pos.	#	Name	Height	Weight	Year	Previous school	Hometown
G	10	Derrick Taylor	6 ft 0 in (1.83 m)	185 lb (84 kg)	RS Sr	Redemptorist HS	Baton Rouge, LA
G	11	Anthony Wilson	6 ft 4 in (1.93 m)	192 lb (87 kg)	Jr	Plain Dealing HS	Plain Dealing, LA
G	14	Edwin Wilson	5 ft 10 in (1.78 m)	150 lb (68 kg)	So	LaGrange HS	Lake Charles, LA
G	15	Ocie Conley	6 ft 1 in (1.85 m)	179 lb (81 kg)	So	Lee HS	Marianna, AR
G	20	Neboisha Bukumirovich	6 ft 4 in (1.93 m)	181 lb (82 kg)	So	Medical HS, Belgrade	Nikšić, Yugoslavia
G	21	Dennis Brown (I)	6 ft 0 in (1.83 m)	169 lb (77 kg)	Jr	Woodlawn HS	Baton Rouge, LA
F	24	John Williams	6 ft 8 in (2.03 m)	237 lb (108 kg)	So	Crenshaw HS	Los Angeles, CA
F	25	Chris Carrier	6 ft 5 in (1.96 m)	205 lb (93 kg)	So	Eunice HS	Eunice, LA
F	30	Bernard Woodside	6 ft 6 in (1.98 m)	207 lb (94 kg)	So	St. Agnes Cathedral HS	Hempstead, NY
G	31	Oliver Brown	6 ft 6 in (1.98 m)	195 lb (88 kg)	Jr	University HS	Baton Rouge, LA
G/F	33	Ricky Blanton	6 ft 6 in (1.98 m)	225 lb (102 kg)	So	Killian HS	Miami, FL
F	41	Nikita Wilson	6 ft 7 in (2.01 m)	200 lb (91 kg)	Jr	Leesville HS	Leesville, LA
C	43	José Vargas	6 ft 9 in (2.06 m)	225 lb (102 kg)	So	Evangelico Central	La Romana, Dominican Republic
G/F	44	Don Redden (C)	6 ft 6 in (1.98 m)	213 lb (97 kg)	Sr	Ouachita HS	Monroe, LA
C	45	Zoran Jovanovich	7 ft 0 in (2.13 m)	247 lb (112 kg)	So	Fifth HS	Belgrade, Yugoslavia

Head coach

- Dale Brown (Minot State)

Assistant coach(es)

- Ron Abernathy (Morehead State)
- Bo Bahnsen (LSU)
- Johnny Jones (LSU)

Legend

- (C) Team captain
- (S) Suspended
- (I) Ineligible
- (W) Walk-on
- Injured
- Current redshirt

Roster

== Schedule and results ==
Date time, TV	Rank^{#}	Opponent^{#}	Result	Record	Site city, state
Non-conference regular season
11/22/1985*	No. 14	Montana State	W 84–59	1–0	LSU Assembly Center; Baton Rouge, LA
11/27/1985*	No. 12	at Washington	W 70–61	2–0	Hec Edmundson Pavilion; Seattle, WA
11/30/1985*	No. 12	at BYU–Hawaii	W 89–71	3–0	Laie, HI
12/01/1985*	No. 12	at Hawaii Pacific	W 101–89	4–0	Honolulu, HI
12/02/1985*	No. 12	at Hawaii Loa	W 77–68	5–0	Kaneohe, HI
12/03/1985*	No. 11	at Hawaii–Hilo	W 70–61	6–0	Hilo, HI
12/14/1985*	No. 11	Hardin–Simmons	W 87–71	7–0	LSU Assembly Center; Baton Rouge, LA
12/16/1985*	No. 11	at Lamar	W 74–57	8–0	Montagne Center; Beaumont, TX
12/17/1985*	No. 9	at Texas	W 72–65	9–0	Frank Erwin Center; Austin, TX
12/20/1985*	No. 9	Southeastern Louisiana; LSU Invitational semifinal	W 82–61	10–0	LSU Assembly Center; Baton Rouge, LA
12/21/1985*	No. 9	Southern; LSU Invitational Final	W 91–83	11–0	LSU Assembly Center; Baton Rouge, LA
12/30/1985*	No. 9	Oral Roberts	W 82–64	12–0	LSU Assembly Center; Baton Rouge, LA
SEC regular season
01/02/1986	No. 8	Georgia	W 85–73	13–0 (1–0)	LSU Assembly Center; Baton Rouge, LA
01/04/1986	No. 8	Mississippi State	W 90–84	14–0 (2–0)	LSU Assembly Center; Baton Rouge, LA
01/09/1986	No. 8	at Alabama	L 67–83	14–1 (2–1)	Memorial Coliseum; Tuscaloosa, AL
01/11/1986	No. 8	at Tennessee	L 77–88	14–2 (2–2)	Stokely Athletic Center; Knoxville, TN
01/13/1986	No. 8	Ole Miss	W 86–68	15–2 (3–2)	LSU Assembly Center; Baton Rouge, LA
01/18/1986	No. 14	Vanderbilt	W 84–67	16–2 (4–2)	LSU Assembly Center; Baton Rouge, LA
01/22/1986	No. 14	at Florida	L 65–74	16–3 (4–3)	O'Connell Center; Gainesville, FL
01/29/1986	No. 17	No. 8 Kentucky	L 52–54	16–4 (4–4)	LSU Assembly Center; Baton Rouge, LA
02/01/1986	No. 17	at Georgia	L 76–92	16–5 (4–5)	Georgia Coliseum; Athens, GA
02/02/1986*	No. 17	at Georgetown	L 72–74	16–6	Capital Centre; Landover, MD
02/04/1986		at Auburn	W 63–61	17–6 (5–5)	Memorial Coliseum; Auburn, AL
02/05/1986		at Mississippi State	W 68–62	18–6 (6–5)	Humphrey Coliseum; Mississippi State, MS
02/09/1986		No. 20 Alabama	L 71–80	18–7 (6–6)	LSU Assembly Center; Baton Rouge, LA
02/12/1986		Tennessee	W 75–50	19–7 (7–6)	LSU Assembly Center; Baton Rouge, LA
02/15/1986		at Ole Miss	L 57–58	19–8 (7–7)	Tad Smith Coliseum; Oxford, MS
02/20/1986		at Vanderbilt	W 74–68	20–8 (8–7)	Memorial Gymnasium; Nashville, TN
02/22/1986		Florida	W 80–69	21–8 (9–7)	LSU Assembly Center; Baton Rouge, LA
02/26/1986		Auburn	L 86–92	21–9 (9–8)	LSU Assembly Center; Baton Rouge, LA
03/01/1986		at No. 5 Kentucky	L 57–68	21–10 (9–9)	Rupp Arena; Lexington, KY
SEC tournament
03/06/1986; LSN	(5)	vs. (4) Florida; Quarterfinals	W 72–66	22–10	Rupp Arena; Lexington, KY
03/07/1986; LSN	(5)	at (1) No. 4 Kentucky; Semifinals	L 58–61	22–11	Rupp Arena; Lexington, KY
NCAA tournament
03/13/1986*	(11 SE)	vs. (6 SE) Purdue; First round	W 94–87 ^{2 OT}	23–11	LSU Assembly Center; Baton Rouge, LA
03/15/1986*	(11 SE)	vs. (3 SE) No. 12 Memphis State; Second round	W 83–81	24–11	LSU Assembly Center (13,749); Baton Rouge, LA
03/20/1986*	(11 SE)	vs. (2 SE) Georgia Tech; Regional semifinals	W 70–64	25–11	The Omni; Atlanta, GA
03/22/1986*	(11 SE)	vs. (1 SE) Kentucky; Regional Finals	W 59–57	26–11	The Omni; Atlanta, GA
03/29/1986*	(11 SE)	vs. (2 W) Louisville; Semifinals	L 77–88	26–12	Reunion Arena; Dallas, TX
*Non-conference game. ^{#}Rankings from AP Poll. (#) Tournament seedings in parentheses. All times are in Central Time.
