= 1985–86 UC Irvine Anteaters men's basketball team =

American college basketball season

1985–86 UC Irvine Anteaters men's basketball

NIT, Second Round
- Conference: Pacific Coast Athletic Association
- Record: 17–13 (12–6 PCAA)
- Head coach: Bill Mulligan (6th season)
- Home arena: Crawford Hall

1985–86 Pacific Coast Athletic Association men's basketball standings
	Conf.				Overall
Team	W		L	PCT	W		L	PCT
No. 11 UNLV †	16	–	2	.889	33	–	5	.868
UC Irvine	12	–	6	.667	17	–	13	.567
New Mexico State	10	–	8	.556	18	–	12	.600
San Jose State	9	–	9	.500	16	–	12	.571
Pacific	9	–	9	.500	17	–	14	.548
Cal State Fullerton	8	–	10	.444	16	–	16	.500
Fresno State	8	–	10	.444	15	–	15	.500
Utah State	8	–	10	.444	12	–	16	.429
UC Santa Barbara	7	–	11	.389	12	–	15	.444
Long Beach State	3	–	15	.167	7	–	22	.241
† 1986 PCAA tournament winner

The 1985–86 UC Irvine Anteaters men's basketball team represented the University of California, Irvine during the 1985–86 NCAA Division I men's basketball season. The Anteaters were led by sixth year head coach Bill Mulligan and played their home games at the Crawford Hall. They were members of the Pacific Coast Athletic Association. They finished the season 17–13 and 12–6 in PCAA play. UCI defeated conference champion UNLV twice, both while the Rebels were ranked in the top 10, once on each team's home court.

== Previous season ==
The 1984–85 UC Irvine Anteaters men's basketball team returned finished with a record of 13–17 and 8–10 in PCAA play. Junior Forward/Center Tod Murphy received AP Honorable Mention All-American Honors.

== Roster ==
1985–86 UC Irvine Anteaters men's basketball team
Players
Coaches

Pos.	#	Name	Height	Weight	Year	Hometown
G	12	Scott Brooks	5 ft 11 in (1.8 m)	165 lb (75 kg)	Jr	French Camp, CA
G	23	Joe Buchanan	6 ft 1 in (1.85 m)	175 lb (79 kg)	Jr	Seattle, WA
C	40	Sandy Caldwell	6 ft 10 in (2.08 m)	235 lb (107 kg)	Fr	Melbourne (Australia)
F	24	Troy Carmon	6 ft 6 in (1.98 m)	205 lb (93 kg)	Sr	Long Beach, CA
C	35	Rick Ciaccio	6 ft 10 in (2.08 m)	210 lb (95 kg)	Sr	Newport Beach, CA
F	22	Rob Doktorczyk	6 ft 9 in (2.06 m)	175 lb (79 kg)	Fr	San Pedro, CA
F	30	Wayne Engelstad	6 ft 8 in (2.03 m)	245 lb (111 kg)	So	Rosemead, CA
G	25	Mike Hess	6 ft 1 in (1.85 m)	180 lb (82 kg)	So	Hilton Head, SC
C	43	Tod Murphy	6 ft 9 in (2.06 m)	220 lb (100 kg)	Sr	Long Beach, CA
F	32	Johnny Rogers	6 ft 10 in (2.08 m)	225 lb (102 kg)	Sr	Fullerton, CA
G	25	Peter Strauss	6 ft 5 in (1.96 m)	180 lb (82 kg)	So	Hilton Head, SC
G	11	Brian Williams	5 ft 10 in (1.78 m)	165 lb (75 kg)	Jr	Los Angeles, CA

Head coach

Bill Mulligan

Assistant coach(es)

Legend

- (C) Team captain
- (S) Suspended
- (I) Ineligible
- (W) Walk-on
- Injured
- Current redshirt

Roster
Last update: September 19, 2017

== Schedule ==
Date time, TV	Rank^{#}	Opponent^{#}	Result	Record	Site (attendance) city, state
Non-Conference Season
November 30, 1985		at New Orleans	L 76–88	0–1	University of New Orleans Lakefront Arena (1,851); New Orleans, LA
December 2, 1985*		at Nebraska	W 87–80	1–1	Bob Devaney Sports Center (7,087); Lincoln, NE
December 7, 1985*		Pepperdine	L 72–81	1–2	Firestone Fieldhouse (3,010); Malibu, CA
December 12, 1985*		Montana	W 85–72	2–2	Crawford Hall (1,302); Irvine, CA
December 14, 1985*		Boise State	W 87–74	3–2	Crawford Hall (1,067); Irvine, CA
December 18, 1985*		at Loyola Marymount	L 100–122	3–3	Gersten Pavilion (1,292); Los Angeles, CA
December 23, 1985*		Oral Roberts	L 63–69	3–4	Crawford Hall (793); Irvine, CA
December 27, 1985*		vs. Loyola Marymount; Wolf Pack Classic	W 99–75	4–4	Lawlor Events Center (2,400); Reno, NV
December 28, 1985*		vs. Nevada; Wolf Pack Classic	L 86–89	4–5	Lawlor Events Center (5,045); Reno, NV
Conference Season
January 2, 1986		San Jose State	W 72–67	5–5 (1–0)	Crawford Hall (1,312); Irvine, CA
January 4, 1986		Utah State	W 96–82	6–5 (2–0)	Crawford Hall (1,243); Irvine, CA
January 9, 1986		at Fresno State	L 48–53	6–6 (2–1)	Selland Arena (10,132); Fresno, CA
January 11, 1986		at Pacific	W 83–75	7–6 (3–1)	Alex G. Spanos Center (3,500); Stockton, CA
January 16, 1986		at Cal State Fullerton	L 54–66	7–7 (3–2)	Titan Gym (2,531); Fullerton, CA
January 18, 1986		UC Santa Barbara	W 99–88	8–7 (4–2)	Crawford Hall (1,400); Irvine, CA
January 23, 1986		Long Beach State	W 85–63	9–7 (5–2)	Crawford Hall (1,246); Irvine, CA
January 25, 1986		New Mexico State	L 71–83	9–7 (5–3)	Crawford Hall (1,479); Irvine, CA
January 30, 1986		at Utah State	W 89–79	10–7 (6–3)	Smith Spectrum (6,192); Logan, UT
February 2, 1986		at San Jose State	L 55–71	10–8 (6–4)	San Jose Civic Auditorium (2,407); San Jose, CA
February 6, 1986		Fresno State	W 60–58	11–9 (7–4)	Crawford Hall (1,479); Irvine, CA
February 8, 1986		Pacific	W 80–76	12–9 (8–4)	Crawford Hall (1,341); Irvine, CA
February 10, 1986		New Mexico State	L 75–98	12–10 (8–5)	Pan American Center (8,217); Las Cruces, NM
February 15, 1986		at No. 6 UNLV	W 99–92	13–10 (9–5)	Thomas & Mack Center (15,616); Paradise, NV
February 20, 1986		at Long Beach State	W 95–80	14–10 (10–5)	Gold Mine (1,052); Long Beach, CA
February 24, 1986		at UC Santa Barbara	W 87–79	15–10 (11–5)	UC Santa Barbara Events Center (2,687); Santa Barbara, CA
February 27, 1986		No. 9 UNLV	W 95–88	16–10 (12–5)	Crawford Hall (1,629); Irvine, CA
March 1, 1986		Cal State Fullerton	L 68–78	16–11 (12–6)	Crawford Hall (1,513); Irvine, CA
PCAA tournament
March 6, 1986		vs. Cal State Fullerton; Quarterfinals	L 58–66	16–12	The Forum (9,613); Inglewood, CA
NIT
March 13, 1986*		at UCLA; First Round	W 80–74	17–12	Pauley Pavilion (7,089); Los Angeles, CA
March 18, 1986*		at BYU; Second Round	L 80–93	17–13	Marriott Center (11,436); Provo, UT
*Non-conference game. ^{#}Rankings from AP Poll. (#) Tournament seedings in parentheses. All times are in Pacific Time.
