= 1985–86 UTEP Miners men's basketball team =

American college basketball season

1985–86 UTEP Miners men's basketball

WAC Regular Season co-champions WAC Tournament champions

NCAA tournament, first round
- Conference: Western Athletic Conference

Ranking
- Coaches: No. 16
- AP: No. 20
- Record: 27–6 (12–4 WAC)
- Head coach: Don Haskins (25th season)
- Assistant coaches: Tim Floyd; Rus Bradburd; Duke Allgood
- Home arena: Special Events Center

1985–86 WAC men's basketball standings
| | Conf. | | | | Overall |
| Team | W | | L | PCT | W | | L | PCT |
|---|---|---|---|---|---|---|---|---|
| Wyoming | 12 | – | 4 | .750 | 24 | – | 12 | .667 |
| No. 20 UTEP † | 12 | – | 4 | .750 | 27 | – | 6 | .818 |
| Utah | 12 | – | 4 | .750 | 20 | – | 10 | .667 |
| Brigham Young | 11 | – | 5 | .688 | 18 | – | 14 | .563 |
| New Mexico | 8 | – | 8 | .500 | 17 | – | 14 | .548 |
| San Diego State | 7 | – | 9 | .438 | 10 | – | 19 | .345 |
| Colorado State | 6 | – | 10 | .375 | 11 | – | 18 | .379 |
| Air Force | 3 | – | 13 | .188 | 10 | – | 19 | .345 |
| Hawaii | 1 | – | 15 | .063 | 4 | – | 24 | .143 |
† 1986 WAC tournament winner Rankings from AP Poll

The 1985–86 UTEP Miners men's basketball team represented the University of Texas at El Paso in the 1985–86 college basketball season. The team was led by head coach Don Haskins. The Miners finished 26–7 (12–4 in WAC), won the conference tournament title, and reached the NCAA tournament.

== Roster ==
1985–86 UTEP Miners men's basketball team
Players
Coaches

| Pos. | # | Name | Height | Weight | Year | Hometown |
|---|---|---|---|---|---|---|
| G | 10 | Tim Hardaway | 6 ft 0 in (1.83 m) | 160 lb (73 kg) | Fr | Chicago, Illinois |
| C | 33 | Dave Feitl | 6 ft 11 in (2.11 m) | 230 lb (104 kg) | Sr | Tucson, Arizona |

Head coach

- Don Haskins

Assistant coach(es)

Legend

- (C) Team captain
- (S) Suspended
- (I) Ineligible
- (W) Walk-on
- Injured
- Current redshirt

== Schedule and results ==
| Date time, TV | Rank^{#} | Opponent^{#} | Result | Record | Site city, state |
Non-conference Regular Season
| Nov 22, 1985* | | vs. Washington; Preseason NIT | L 53–82 | 0–1 | McNichols Sports Arena (4,500); Denver, Colorado |
| Nov 27, 1985* | | Appalachian State | W 58–52 | 1–1 | Special Events Center (10,211); El Paso, Texas |
| Nov 29, 1985* | | Morgan State | W 58–39 | 2–1 | Special Events Center (9,524); El Paso, Texas |
| Dec 3, 1985* | | New Mexico State | W 68–59 | 3–1 | Special Events Center (11,524); El Paso, Texas |
| Dec 6, 1985* | | Texas Southern | W 78–54 | 4–1 | Special Events Center (8,521); El Paso, Texas |
| Dec 7, 1985* | | Texas-Pan American | W 64–50 | 5–1 | Special Events Center (9,678); El Paso, Texas |
| Dec 12, 1985* | | at New Mexico State | W 53–52 | 6–1 | Pan American Center (12,752); Las Cruces, New Mexico |
| Dec 16, 1985* | | Centenary | W 69–63 | 7–1 | Special Events Center (7,093); El Paso, Texas |
| Dec 21, 1985* | | Alcorn State | W 78–47 | 8–1 | Special Events Center (8,126); El Paso, Texas |
| Dec 27, 1985* | | No. 5 Georgetown | W 78–64 | 9–1 | Special Events Center (12,222); El Paso, Texas |
| Dec 29, 1985* | | Ohio State; Sun Carnival Classic Tournament | W 58–57 | 10–1 | Special Events Center (11,561); El Paso, Texas |
| Dec 30, 1985* | | Alabama; Sun Carnival Classic Tournament | W 74–62 | 11–1 | Special Events Center (12,222); El Paso, Texas |
WAC Regular Season
| Jan 2, 1986 | No. 19 | BYU | W 69–64 | 12–1 (1–0) | Special Events Center (12,222); El Paso, Texas |
| Jan 4, 1986 | No. 19 | Utah | W 62–52 | 13–1 (2–0) | Special Events Center (12,222); El Paso, Texas |
| Jan 10, 1986 | No. 15 | at Air Force | W 68–54 | 14–1 (3–0) | Clune Arena (3,200); Colorado Springs, Colorado |
| Jan 11, 1986 | No. 15 | at Wyoming | L 62–63 | 14–2 (3–1) | Arena-Auditorium (6,117); Laramie, Wyoming |
| Jan 16, 1986 | No. 17 | at Hawaii | W 65–63 | 15–2 (4–1) | Neal S. Blaisdell Center (2,315); Honolulu, Hawaii |
| Jan 18, 1986 | No. 17 | at San Diego State | L 66–67 | 15–3 (4–2) | Peterson Gymnasium (3,663); San Diego, California |
| Jan 23, 1986 | No. 19 | Colorado State | W 65–57 | 16–3 (5–2) | Special Events Center (12,222); El Paso, Texas |
| Jan 25, 1986 | No. 19 | at New Mexico | W 71–70 | 17–3 (6–2) | The Pit (18,219); Albuquerque, New Mexico |
| Feb 1, 1986 | No. 19 | New Mexico | W 68–54 | 18–3 (7–2) | Special Events Center (12,222); El Paso, Texas |
| Feb 4, 1986* | No. 17 | at Oregon State | W 64–49 | 19–3 | Gill Coliseum (7,230); Corvallis, Oregon |
| Feb 6, 1986 | No. 17 | Wyoming | W 72–58 | 20–3 (8–2) | Special Events Center (12,222); El Paso, Texas |
| Feb 8, 1986 | No. 17 | Air Force | W 71–47 | 21–3 (9–2) | Special Events Center (11,791); El Paso, Texas |
| Feb 14, 1986 | No. 15 | at Utah | L 67–71 | 21–4 (9–3) | Jon M. Huntsman Center (11,050); Salt Lake City, Utah |
| Feb 15, 1986 | No. 15 | at BYU | L 69–72 | 21–5 (9–4) | Marriott Center (22,837); Provo, Utah |
| Feb 20, 1986 | | at Colorado State | W 64–61 | 22–5 (10–4) | Moby Arena (4,417); Fort Collins, Colorado |
| Feb 27, 1986 | | San Diego State | W 91–64 | 23–5 (11–4) | Special Events Center (12,222); El Paso, Texas |
| Mar 1, 1986* | | Hawaii | W 78–66 | 24–5 (12–4) | Special Events Center (12,222); El Paso, Texas |
WAC tournament
| Mar 6, 1986* | | vs. Colorado State; WAC Tournament Quarterfinal | W 58–50 | 25–5 | Arena-Auditorium (6,194); Laramie, Wyoming |
| Mar 7, 1986* | | vs. San Diego State; WAC Tournament Semifinal | W 78–76 | 26–5 | Arena-Auditorium (8,138); Laramie, Wyoming |
| Mar 8, 1986* | | at Wyoming | W 65–64 | 27–5 | Arena-Auditorium (12,039); Laramie, Wyoming |
NCAA tournament
| Mar 13, 1986* | (10 W) No. 20 | vs. (7 W) No. 14 Bradley; First Round | L 65–83 | 27–6 | Dee Events Center (9,978); Ogden, Utah |
*Non-conference game. ^{#}Rankings from AP Poll. (#) Tournament seedings in parentheses. W=West.

== NBA draft ==
| Round | Pick | Player | NBA club |
|---|---|---|---|
| 2 | 43 | Dave Feitl | Houston Rockets |
