= List of UC Irvine Anteaters men's basketball head coaches =

The men's college basketball program of the University of California, Irvine (UC Irvine) was founded in 1965 and is known competitively as the UC Irvine Anteaters. The team has had 7 head coaches in its history.

Years	Duration of head coaching career at UC Irvine
Won	Number of games won at UC Irvine
Lost	Number of games lost at UC Irvine
%	Percentage of games won at UC Irvine
*	Elected to the Naismith Memorial Basketball Hall of Fame as a coach

Statistics updated through 2018–19season

Head Coach	Years	Won	Lost	%
Danny Rogers	1965–1967	30	22	.577
Dick Davis	1967–1969	39	17	.696
Tim Tift	1969–1980	145	147	.497
Bill Mulligan	1980–1991	163	156	.511
Rod Baker	1991–1997	52	116	.310
Pat Douglass	1997–2010	197	191	.508
Russell Turner	2010–Present	209	139	.601
