= 1985–86 Kentucky Wildcats men's basketball team =

1985–86 season of University of Kentucky men's basketball team

1985–86 Kentucky Wildcats men's basketball
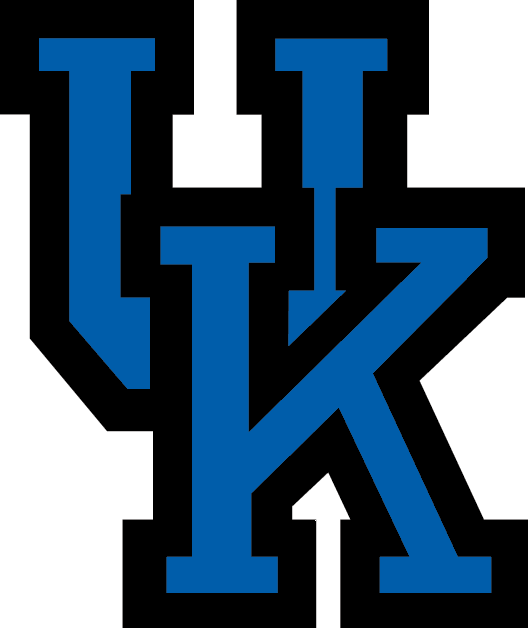

SEC regular season champions SEC tournament champions

NCAA tournament, Elite Eight
- Conference: Southeastern Conference

Ranking
- Coaches: No. 4
- AP: No. 3
- Record: 32–4 (17–1 SEC)
- Head coach: Eddie Sutton (1st season)
- Home arena: Rupp Arena

1985–86 Southeastern Conference men's basketball standings
	Conf.				Overall
Team	W		L	PCT	W		L	PCT
No. 3 Kentucky †	17	–	1	.944	32	–	4	.889
Alabama	13	–	5	.722	24	–	9	.727
Auburn	13	–	5	.722	22	–	11	.667
Florida	10	–	8	.556	19	–	14	.576
LSU	9	–	9	.500	26	–	12	.684
Georgia	9	–	9	.500	17	–	13	.567
Vanderbilt	7	–	11	.389	13	–	15	.464
Tennessee	5	–	13	.278	12	–	16	.429
Ole Miss	4	–	14	.222	12	–	17	.414
Mississippi State	3	–	15	.167	6	–	22	.214
† 1986 SEC tournament winner Rankings from AP Poll

The 1985–86 Kentucky Wildcats men's basketball team represented University of Kentucky in the 1985–86 NCAA Division I men's basketball season. The head coach was Eddie Sutton and the team finished the season with an overall record of 32–4. After winning the SEC Tournament the Wildcats were invited to the 1985 NCAA Tournament as a #1 seed. Kentucky advanced to the Elite 8 with victories over Davidson, Western Kentucky and Alabama. But their season came to an end after losing to the #11 seed L.S.U. Tigers 59–57.

== Roster ==
1985–86 Kentucky Wildcats men's basketball team
Players
Coaches

Pos.	#	Name	Height	Weight	Year	Previous school	Hometown
G	10	James Blackmon	6 ft 3 in (1.91 m)	180 lb (82 kg)	Jr	Marion HS	Marion, IN
G	12	Leroy Byrd	5 ft 5 in (1.65 m)	145 lb (66 kg)	Sr		Lexington, Kentucky
G	14	Paul Andrews	6 ft 3 in (1.91 m)	180 lb (82 kg)	Jr		London, Kentucky
G	15	Ed Davender	6 ft 2 in (1.88 m)	—	So	Boys and Girls HS	Brooklyn, NY
G	23	Roger Harden	6 ft 1 in (1.85 m)	165 lb (75 kg)	Sr		Valparaiso, Indiana
SF	25	Winston Bennett	6 ft 7 in (2.01 m)	210 lb (95 kg)	Jr	Louisville Male HS	Louisville, KY
PF	30	Irving Thomas	6 ft 8 in (2.03 m)	215 lb (98 kg)	Fr	Miami Carol City HS	Miami, FL
SF	34	Kenny Walker	6 ft 8 in (2.03 m)	205 lb (93 kg)	Sr	Crawford County HS	Roberta, GA
PF	44	Rob Lock	6 ft 9 in (2.06 m)	220 lb (100 kg)	So	Reedley HS	Reedley, CA

Head coach

Eddie Sutton (Oklahoma State)

Assistant coach(es)

Legend

- (C) Team captain
- (S) Suspended
- (I) Ineligible
- (W) Walk-on
- Injured
- Current redshirt

== Schedule and results ==
Date time, TV	Rank^{#}	Opponent^{#}	Result	Record	Site city, state
Non-conference regular season
Nov 22, 1985*	No. 11	Northwestern State	W 77–58	1–0	Rupp Arena; Lexington, Kentucky
Nov 26, 1985	No. 10	at Chaminade	W 89–57	2–0 (1–0)	McCabe Gymnasium; Honolulu, Hawaii
Nov 27, 1985*	No. 10	at Hawaii	W 98–65	3–0	Neal S. Blaisdell Center; Honolulu, Hawaii
Dec 3, 1985*	No. 9	Cincinnati	W 84–54	4–0	Rupp Arena; Lexington, Kentucky
Dec 7, 1985*	No. 9	No. 19 Indiana	W 63–58	5–0	Rupp Arena; Lexington, Kentucky
Dec 14, 1985*	No. 9	at No. 7 Kansas	L 68–83	5–1	Allen Fieldhouse; Lawrence, Kansas
Dec 20, 1985*	No. 13	East Carolina	W 86–52	6–1	Rupp Arena; Lexington, Kentucky
Dec 21, 1985*	No. 13	Pepperdine	W 88–56	7–1	Rupp Arena; Lexington, Kentucky
Dec 28, 1985*	No. 13	No. 15 Louisville	W 69–64	8–1	Rupp Arena; Lexington, Kentucky
Dec 30, 1985*	No. 12	vs. VMI	W 93–55	9–1	Freedom Hall; Louisville, Kentucky
SEC Regular Season
Jan 4, 1986	No. 12	at Vanderbilt	W 80–71	10–1 (1–0)	Memorial Gymnasium; Nashville, Tennessee
Jan 6, 1986	No. 11	at Auburn	L 56–60	10–2 (1–1)	Memorial Coliseum; Auburn, Alabama
Jan 8, 1986	No. 11	Ole Miss	W 75–58	11–2 (2–1)	Rupp Arena; Lexington, Kentucky
Jan 11, 1986	No. 11	Alabama	W 76–52	12–2 (3–1)	Rupp Arena; Lexington, Kentucky
Jan 15, 1986	No. 11	at Mississippi State	W 64–52	13–2 (4–1)	Humphrey Coliseum; Starkville, Mississippi
Jan 18, 1986	No. 11	at Florida	W 72–55	14–2 (5–1)	Stephen C. O'Connell Center; Gainesville, Florida
Jan 23, 1986	No. 11	Georgia	W 74–69	15–2 (6–1)	Rupp Arena; Lexington, Kentucky
Jan 25, 1986	No. 11	Tennessee	W 74–57	16–2 (7–1)	Rupp Arena; Lexington, Kentucky
Jan 29, 1986	No. 8	at No. 17 LSU	W 54–52	17–2 (8–1)	Maravich Assembly Center; Baton Rouge, Louisiana
Jan 31, 1986	No. 8	Auburn	W 81–71	18–2 (9–1)	Rupp Arena; Lexington, Kentucky
Feb 2, 1986*	No. 8	at NC State	L 51–54	18–3	Reynolds Coliseum; Raleigh, North Carolina
Feb 5, 1986	No. 12	Vanderbilt	W 73–65	19–3 (10–1)	Rupp Arena; Lexington, Kentucky
Feb 8, 1986	No. 12	at Ole Miss	W 62–58	20–3 (11–1)	Tad Smith Coliseum; Oxford, Mississippi
Feb 13, 1986	No. 11	at No. 18 Alabama	W 73–71	21–3 (12–1)	Coleman Coliseum; Tuscaloosa, Alabama
Feb 15, 1986	No. 11	Mississippi State	W 88–62	22–3 (13–1)	Rupp Arena; Lexington, Kentucky
Feb 19, 1986	No. 8	Florida	W 80–69	23–3 (14–1)	Rupp Arena; Lexington, Kentucky
Feb 22, 1986	No. 8	at Georgia	W 80–75	24–3 (15–1)	Stegeman Coliseum; Athens, Georgia
Feb 27, 1986; LSN	No. 5	at Tennessee	W 62–60	25–3 (16–1)	Stokely Athletic Center; Knoxville, Tennessee
Mar 1, 1986	No. 5	LSU	W 68–57	26–3 (17–1)	Rupp Arena; Lexington, Kentucky
SEC Tournament
Mar 6, 1986*; LSN	(1) No. 3	(9) Ole Miss; SEC Tournament Quarterfinal	W 95–69	27–3	Rupp Arena; Lexington, Kentucky
Mar 7, 1986*; LSN	(1) No. 3	(5) LSU; SEC Tournament Semifinal	W 61–58	28–3	Rupp Arena; Lexington, Kentucky
Mar 8, 1986*; NBC	(1) No. 3	(3) Alabama; SEC tournament championship	W 83–72	29–3	Rupp Arena; Lexington, Kentucky
NCAA Tournament
Mar 14, 1986*	(1 SE) No. 3	vs. (16 SE) Davidson; First round	W 75–55	30–3	Charlotte Coliseum; Charlotte, North Carolina
Mar 16, 1986*	(1 SE) No. 3	vs. (8 SE) Western Kentucky; Second Round	W 71–64	31–3	Charlotte Coliseum; Charlotte, North Carolina
Mar 20, 1986*; CBS	(1 SE) No. 3	vs. (5 SE) Alabama; Southeast Regional semifinal – Sweet Sixteen	W 68–63	32–3	The Omni; Atlanta, Georgia
Mar 22, 1986*; CBS	(1 SE) No. 3	vs. (11 SE) LSU; Southeast Regional Final – Elite Eight	L 57–59	32–4	The Omni; Atlanta, Georgia
*Non-conference game. ^{#}Rankings from AP poll. (#) Tournament seedings in parentheses. SE=Southeast.
