= Don Redden =

American basketball player

Personal information
- Born: October 10, 1963 Monroe, Louisiana, U.S.
- Died: March 9, 1988 (aged 24) Baton Rouge, Louisiana, U.S.
- Listed height: 6 ft 6 in (1.98 m)
- Listed weight: 210 lb (95 kg)

Career information
- High school: Ouachita Parish (Monroe, Louisiana)
- College: LSU (1982–1986)
- NBA draft: 1986: 3rd round, 64th overall pick
- Drafted by: Denver Nuggets
- Position: Guard
- Stats at Basketball Reference

Don Redden (October 10, 1963 - March 8, 1988) was an American basketball player. Redden, a 6-foot-5 guard/forward for Louisiana State University (LSU) who averaged 13 points and five rebounds as a senior in 1985–86, was captain of the LSU team that reached the 1986 Final Four. During the 1986 NCAA tournament, Redden averaged more than 20 points per game, earning MVP honors for the Southeast Regional.

In 2009, he was voted to LSU's All-Century team. He finished his college career at LSU's 14th all-time leading scorer and still ranks among the top 10 on the school's all-time free-throw percentage leaders.

After college, Redden was selected by the Denver Nuggets in the third round (64th pick) of the 1986 NBA draft. He was waived by the Nuggets on October 12, 1986. He played for the Gold Coast Stingrays of the United States Basketball League during the summer of 1986. In 1987, he signed a two-year contingency contract with the San Antonio Spurs, though never played in a regular season NBA game. He later played professionally in Europe.

In 1988, at the age of 24, Redden died of idiopathic cardiomyopathy (heart failure) in Baton Rouge, Louisiana. He is buried in Resthaven Gardens of Memory in Baton Rouge, Louisiana, near former LSU star Pete Maravich, a member of the NBA Hall of Fame.

A native of Monroe, Louisiana, Redden was a two-time All-State player at Ouachita Parish High School (Monroe, Louisiana). His high school jersey number (44) has been retired.
