= 1985–86 Utah Utes men's basketball team =

American college basketball season

1985–86 Utah Utes men's basketball

WAC Regular season co-champions

NCAA tournament
- Conference: Western Athletic Conference
- Record: 20–10 (12–4 WAC)
- Head coach: Lynn Archibald (3rd season)
- Home arena: Special Events Center

1985–86 WAC men's basketball standings
	Conf.				Overall
Team	W		L	PCT	W		L	PCT
Wyoming	12	–	4	.750	24	–	12	.667
No. 20 UTEP †	12	–	4	.750	27	–	6	.818
Utah	12	–	4	.750	20	–	10	.667
Brigham Young	11	–	5	.688	18	–	14	.563
New Mexico	8	–	8	.500	17	–	14	.548
San Diego State	7	–	9	.438	10	–	19	.345
Colorado State	6	–	10	.375	11	–	18	.379
Air Force	3	–	13	.188	10	–	19	.345
Hawaii	1	–	15	.063	4	–	24	.143
† 1986 WAC tournament winner Rankings from AP Poll

The 1985–86 Utah Utes men's basketball team represented the University of Utah as a member of the Western Athletic Conference during the 1985-86 season. Head coach Lynn Archibald would lead the Utes to a tie for the WAC regular season title and an NCAA tournament appearance.

== Roster ==
1985–86 Utah Utes men's basketball team
Players
Coaches

Pos.	#	Name	Height	Weight	Year	Hometown
G	11	Kelvin Upshaw	6 ft 2 in (1.88 m)	175 lb (79 kg)	Sr	Chicago, Illinois
F	42	Jerry Stroman	6 ft 6 in (1.98 m)	—

Head coach

- Lynn Archibald (Utah State)

Assistant coach(es)

Legend

- (C) Team captain
- (S) Suspended
- (I) Ineligible
- (W) Walk-on
- Injured
- Current redshirt

== Schedule and results ==
Date time, TV	Rank^{#}	Opponent^{#}	Result	Record	Site city, state
Regular Season
Nov 22, 1985*		Tennessee State	W 80–49	1–0	Jon M. Huntsman Center; Salt Lake City, Utah
Nov 23, 1985*		Utah State	L 84–87	1–1	Jon M. Huntsman Center; Salt Lake City, Utah
Nov 29, 1985*		Houston Baptist	W 78–61	2–1	Jon M. Huntsman Center; Salt Lake City, Utah
Nov 30, 1985*		Cal State Fullerton	W 80–66	3–1	Jon M. Huntsman Center; Salt Lake City, Utah
Dec 2, 1985*		at Alabama	L 57–73	3–2	Coleman Coliseum; Tuscaloosa, Alabama
Dec 4, 1985*		Santa Clara	W 76–71	4–2	Jon M. Huntsman Center; Salt Lake City, Utah
Dec 7, 1985*		at Weber State	L 67–68	4–3	Dee Events Center; Ogden, Utah
Dec 14, 1985*		Colorado	W 82–62	5–3	Jon M. Huntsman Center; Salt Lake City, Utah
Dec 21, 1985*		Arizona	W 76–68	6–3	Jon M. Huntsman Center; Salt Lake City, Utah
Dec 28, 1985*		at Utah State	W 61–56	7–3	Dee Glen Smith Spectrum; Logan, Utah
Jan 2, 1986		at New Mexico	L 58–71	7–4 (0–1)	University Arena; Albuquerque, New Mexico
Jan 4, 1986		at No. 19 UTEP	L 52–62	7–5 (0–2)	Special Events Center; El Paso, Texas
Jan 10, 1986		San Diego State	W 93–89 ^{OT}	8–5 (1–2)	Jon M. Huntsman Center; Salt Lake City, Utah
Jan 11, 1986		Hawaii	W 89–67	9–5 (2–2)	Jon M. Huntsman Center; Salt Lake City, Utah
Jan 16, 1986		at Colorado State	W 59–54	10–5 (3–2)	Moby Arena; Fort Collins, Colorado
Jan 18, 1986		at Wyoming	L 79–94	10–6 (3–3)	Arena-Auditorium; Laramie, Wyoming
Jan 22, 1986		Air Force	W 82–60	11–6 (4–3)	Jon M. Huntsman Center; Salt Lake City, Utah
Jan 25, 1986		at BYU	L 69–87	12–7 (4–4)	Marriott Center; Provo, Utah
Jan 29, 1986*		at No. 14 Notre Dame	L 64–94	12–8	Joyce Center; Notre Dame, Indiana
Feb 6, 1986		at Hawaii	W 78–63	13–8 (5–4)	Neal S. Blaisdell Center; Honolulu, Hawaii
Feb 8, 1986		at San Diego State	W 59–58	14–8 (6–4)	San Diego Sports Arena; San Diego, California
Feb 14, 1986		No. 15 UTEP	W 71–67	15–8 (7–4)	Jon M. Huntsman Center; Salt Lake City, Utah
Feb 15, 1986		New Mexico	W 60–59	16–8 (8–4)	Jon M. Huntsman Center; Salt Lake City, Utah
Feb 20, 1986		at Air Force	W 64–63	17–8 (9–4)	Clune Arena; Colorado Springs, Colorado
Feb 22, 1986		BYU	W 74–71	18–8 (10–4)	Jon M. Huntsman Center; Salt Lake City, Utah
Feb 27, 1986		Wyoming	W 74–72	19–8 (11–4)	Jon M. Huntsman Center; Salt Lake City, Utah
Mar 1, 1986		Colorado State	W 80–64	20–8 (12–4)	Jon M. Huntsman Center; Salt Lake City, Utah
WAC Tournament
Mar 6, 1986*		vs. San Diego State; Quarterfinals	L 71–73	20–9	Arena-Auditorium; Laramie, Wyoming
NCAA Tournament
Mar 13, 1986*	(14 W)	vs. (3 W) No. 8 North Carolina; First Round	L 72–84	20–10	Dee Events Center; Ogden, Utah
*Non-conference game. ^{#}Rankings from AP Poll. (#) Tournament seedings in parentheses. W=West.
