= Lynn Archibald =

American basketball player and coach (1944–1997)

Biographical details
- Born: September 27, 1944; Logan, Utah, U.S.
- Died: May 28, 1997 (aged 52); Provo, Utah, U.S.
- Education: Fresno State, 1968

Playing career
- (one year): Utah State
- (one year): El Camino JC

Coaching career (HC unless noted)
- 1970–1972: Long Beach State (assistant)
- 1972–1973: Cal Poly (assistant)
- 1974–1976: UNLV (assistant))
- 1976–1977: USC (assistant)
- 1977–1982: Idaho State
- 1982–1983: Utah (assistant)
- 1983–1989: Utah
- 1989–1994: Arizona State (assistant)
- 1994–1996: Brigham Young (assistant)

Head coaching record
- Overall: 163–152 (.517)

Lynn J. Archibald (September 27, 1944 – May 28, 1997) was an American college basketball coach. He served as head basketball coach at Idaho State University and the University of Utah.

== Early life ==
Born in Logan, Utah, Archibald moved to Oregon and California with his family and graduated from Torrance High School in Torrance, California. He played college basketball at Utah State in Logan as a freshman and at El Camino College as a sophomore; he completed his bachelor's degree at Fresno State.

== Career ==
Archibald was an assistant coach under Jerry Tarkanian at Long Beach State and UNLV, and also had brief stints at Cal Poly–SLO and USC. As a head coach, he worked at Idaho State in Pocatello for five seasons (1977–1982), and then was an assistant at Utah in Salt Lake City for a season. When Jerry Pimm departed for UC Santa Barbara, Archibald was promoted and led the Utes for six years (1983–1989), with a 98–86 (.533) record.

Succeeded by Rick Majerus at Utah, Archibald was an assistant at Arizona State University (1989–1994), then at Brigham Young University in Provo, Utah, and later, the director of basketball operations. After a long battle with prostate cancer, Archibald died at his Provo home at age 52 in 1997.

While at Idaho State in 1979, Archibald mused that the peculiar King Spud Trophy for the intrastate series with Idaho should be awarded to the loser: "It's the ugliest thing I've ever seen. The only good thing that happened last week was losing it."

== Personal life ==
His son Beau, who played college basketball at Washington State, and later, at Connecticut, is also a basketball coach. Another son, Damon, is currently an assistant at Green Bay.

Archibald's son-in-law is Mark Pope, who played collegiately at Washington and Kentucky and became head coach at Kentucky in 2024 after stops at Utah Valley and BYU; Archibald recruited Pope while an assistant at Arizona State.

== Head coaching record ==
Record table
| Season | Team | Overall | Conference | Standing | Postseason |
|---|---|---|---|---|---|
Idaho State Bengals (Big Sky Conference) (1977–1982)
| 1977–78 | Idaho State | 16–10 | 11–3 | 2nd | |
| 1978–79 | Idaho State | 14–13 | 8–6 | T–2nd | |
| 1979–80 | Idaho State | 9–17 | 5–9 | T–5th | |
| 1980–81 | Idaho State | 12–14 | 6–8 | 4th | |
| 1981–82 | Idaho State | 14–12 | 5–9 | T–6th | |
| Idaho State: | | 65–66 (.496) | 35–35 (.500) | | |
Utah Utes (Western Athletic Conference) (1983–1989)
| 1983–84 | Utah | 11–19 | 4–12 | 8th | |
| 1984–85 | Utah | 15–16 | 8–8 | 6th | |
| 1985–86 | Utah | 20–10 | 12–4 | T–1st | NCAA 1st Round |
| 1986–87 | Utah | 17–13 | 9–7 | 5th | NIT 1st Round |
| 1987–88 | Utah | 19–11 | 11–5 | 2nd | NIT 1st Round |
| 1988–89 | Utah | 16–17 | 6–10 | 6th | |
| Utah: | | 98–66 (.598) | 50–46 (.521) | | |
| Total: | | 163–152 (.517) | | | |
National champion Postseason invitational champion Conference regular season champion Conference regular season and conference tournament champion Division regular season champion Division regular season and conference tournament champion Conference tournament champion
