= 1985–86 Alabama Crimson Tide men's basketball team =

American college basketball season

1985–86 Alabama Crimson Tide men's basketball

NCAA tournament, Sweet Sixteen
- Conference: Southeastern Conference

Ranking
- Coaches: No. 19
- Record: 24–9 (13–5 SEC)
- Head coach: Wimp Sanderson (6th season)
- Assistant coach: Rick Barnes (1st season)
- Home arena: Coleman Coliseum

1985–86 Southeastern Conference men's basketball standings
	Conf.				Overall
Team	W		L	PCT	W		L	PCT
No. 3 Kentucky †	17	–	1	.944	32	–	4	.889
Alabama	13	–	5	.722	24	–	9	.727
Auburn	13	–	5	.722	22	–	11	.667
Florida	10	–	8	.556	19	–	14	.576
LSU	9	–	9	.500	26	–	12	.684
Georgia	9	–	9	.500	17	–	13	.567
Vanderbilt	7	–	11	.389	13	–	15	.464
Tennessee	5	–	13	.278	12	–	16	.429
Ole Miss	4	–	14	.222	12	–	17	.414
Mississippi State	3	–	15	.167	6	–	22	.214
† 1986 SEC tournament winner Rankings from AP Poll

The 1985–86 Alabama Crimson Tide men's basketball team represented the University of Alabama in the 1985–86 NCAA Division I men's basketball season. The team's head coach was Wimp Sanderson, who was in his sixth season at Alabama. The team played their home games at Coleman Coliseum in Tuscaloosa, Alabama. They finished the season 24–9, 13–5 in SEC play, finishing in a tie for second place.

The team lost forward Bobby Lee Hurt to graduation, but key additions were freshman forwards Michael Ansley from Jackson-Olin High School in Birmingham and William DeVaughn from Birmingham.

The Tide made it to the 1986 SEC men's basketball tournament final, but lost to Kentucky. They received an at-large bid to the 1986 NCAA Division I men's basketball tournament, where they defeated Xavier and Illinois and reached the Sweet 16 for the second straight season. In the Sweet 16, however, the Tide lost to Kentucky for the fourth time in the 1985–86 season.

== Roster ==
1985–86 Alabama Crimson Tide men's basketball team
Players
Coaches

Pos.	#	Name	Height	Weight	Year	Previous school	Hometown
F	24	Buck Johnson	6 ft 7 in (2.01 m)	—	Sr	Hayes High School	Birmingham, Alabama
F	45	Michael Ansley	6 ft 7 in (2.01 m)	—	Fr	Jackson-Olin High School	Birmingham, Alabama
G	23	Mark Gottfried	6 ft 4 in (1.93 m)	—	Jr
F/C	31	Derrick McKey	6 ft 9 in (2.06 m)	—	So	Meridian High School	Meridian, MS
G	30	Terry Coner	6 ft 3 in (1.91 m)	—	Jr
G	24	Craig Dudley	6 ft 4 in (1.93 m)	—	So
F	21	Jim Farmer	6 ft 4 in (1.93 m)	—	Jr
G	11	James Jackson	5 ft 11 in (1.8 m)	—
	52	William DeVaughn	6 ft 9 in (2.06 m)	—	Fr

Head coach

- Wimp Sanderson

Assistant coach(es)

Legend

- (C) Team captain
- (S) Suspended
- (I) Ineligible
- (W) Walk-on
- Injured
- Current redshirt

== Schedule ==
Date time, TV	Rank^{#}	Opponent^{#}	Result	Record	Site city, state
Regular Season
December 2, 1985*		Utah	W 73–57	1–0	Memorial Coliseum; Tuscaloosa, AL
December 4, 1985*		Rider	W 91–63	2–0	Memorial Coliseum; Tuscaloosa, AL
December 9, 1985*		Murray State	W 99–65	3–0	Memorial Coliseum; Tuscaloosa, AL
December 14, 1985*		Mercer	W 92–49	4–0	Memorial Coliseum; Tuscaloosa, AL
December 16, 1985*		Florida State	W 100–89	5–0	Civic Center; Birmingham, AL
December 21, 1985*		Maryland	L 58–60	5–1	Cole Field House; College Park, MD
December 25, 1985*		Northwestern State	W 82–77	6–1	Memorial Coliseum; Tuscaloosa, AL
December 29, 1985*		Nebraska; Sun Carnival Classic Tournament	W 78–61	7–1	Don Haskins Center; El Paso, TX
December 30, 1985*		No. 19 UTEP; Sun Carnival Classic Tournament	L 62–74	7–2	Don Haskins Center; El Paso, TX
January 2, 1986		Mississippi State	W 71–62	8–2 (1–0)	Humphrey Coliseum; Starkville, MS
January 4, 1986		Georgia	L 80–88	8–3 (1–1)	Stegeman Coliseum; Athens, GA
January 9, 1986		No. 8 LSU	W 83–67	9–3 (2–1)	Memorial Coliseum; Tuscaloosa, AL
January 11, 1986		No. 11 Kentucky	L 52–76	9–4 (2–2)	Rupp Arena; Lexington, KY
January 16, 1986		Auburn; Rivalry	W 60–56	10–4 (3–2)	Memorial Coliseum; Tuscaloosa, AL
January 18, 1986		Tennessee	W 92–79	11–4 (4–2)	Memorial Coliseum; Tuscaloosa, AL
January 22, 1986		Vanderbilt	W 85–72	12–4 (5–2)	Memorial Gymnasium; Nashville, TN
January 25, 1986		Florida	W 67–64	13–4 (6–2)	Memorial Coliseum; Tuscaloosa, AL
January 29, 1986		Ole Miss	W 69–62	14–4 (7–2)	Tad Smith Coliseum; Oxford, MS
February 1, 1986		Mississippi State	W 72–54	15–4 (8–2)	Memorial Coliseum; Tuscaloosa, AL
February 5, 1986		Georgia	W 57–54	16–4 (9–2)	Memorial Coliseum; Tuscaloosa, AL
February 9, 1986		LSU	W 80–71	17–4 (10–2)	Maravich Assembly Center; Baton Rouge, LA
February 13, 1986	No. 17	No. 11 Kentucky	L 71–73	17–5 (10–3)	Memorial Coliseum; Tuscaloosa, AL
February 15, 1986	No. 17	Auburn; Rivalry	L 69–71	17–6 (10–4)	Memorial Coliseum; Tuscaloosa, AL
February 19, 1986	No. 18	Tennessee	W 80–64	18–6 (11–4)	Stokely Athletic Center; Knoxville, TN
February 22, 1986	No. 18	Vanderbilt	W 69–68	19–6 (12–4)	Memorial Coliseum; Tuscaloosa, AL
February 26, 1986	No. 19	Florida	L 65–77	19–7 (12–5)	O'Connell Center; Gainesville, FL
March 2, 1986	No. 19	Ole Miss	W 74–59	20–7 (13–5)	Memorial Coliseum; Tuscaloosa, AL
SEC Tournament
March 6, 1986	(3)	(6) Georgia; Second Round	W 77–59	21–7	Rupp Arena; Lexington, KY
March 7, 1986	(3)	(10) Mississippi State; Semifinals	W 77–65	22–7	Rupp Arena; Lexington, KY
March 8, 1986	(3)	(1) No. 3 Kentucky; SEC Championship	L 72–83	22–8	Rupp Arena; Lexington, KY
NCAA Tournament
March 14, 1986*	(5 SE)	vs. (12 SE) Xavier; First Round	W 97–80	23–8	Charlotte Coliseum; Charlotte, NC
March 16, 1986*	(5 SE)	vs. (4 SE) No. 19 Illinois; Second Round	W 58–56	24–8	Charlotte Coliseum; Charlotte, NC
March 20, 1986*	(5 SE)	vs. (1 SE) No. 3 Kentucky; Regional semifinal - Sweet Sixteen	L 63–68	24–9	The Omni; Atlanta, GA
*Non-conference game. ^{#}Rankings from AP Poll. (#) Tournament seedings in parentheses. All times are in Eastern time.
