= 1985–86 Washington State Cougars men's basketball team =

American college basketball season

1985–86 Washington State Cougars men's basketball
- Conference: Pacific-10
- Record: 15–16 (8–10 Pac-10)
- Head coach: Len Stevens (3rd season)
- Assistant coaches: Kelvin Sampson; Prescott "Puck" Smith
- Home arena: Beasley Coliseum

1985–86 Pacific-10 Conference men's basketball standings
	Conf.				Overall
Team	W		L	PCT	W		L	PCT
Arizona	14	–	4	.778	23	–	9	.719
Washington	13	–	5	.722	19	–	12	.613
California	11	–	7	.611	19	–	10	.655
UCLA	9	–	9	.500	15	–	14	.517
Arizona State	8	–	10	.444	14	–	14	.500
Washington State	8	–	10	.444	15	–	16	.484
Stanford	8	–	10	.444	14	–	16	.467
Oregon State	8	–	10	.444	12	–	15	.444
Oregon	6	–	12	.333	11	–	17	.393
USC	5	–	13	.278	11	–	17	.393
As of March 25, 1986; Rankings from AP Poll

The 1985–86 Washington State Cougars men's basketball team represented Washington State University for the 1985–86 NCAA Division I men's basketball season. Led by third-year head coach Len Stevens, the Cougars were members of the Pacific-10 Conference and played their home games on campus at Beasley Coliseum in Pullman, Washington.

The Cougars were 15–16 overall in the regular season and 8–10 in conference play, tied for fifth in the standings. There was no conference tournament this season; it debuted the following year.
