= Bill Mulligan =

American college basketball coach (1931–2022)

Biographical details
- Born: February 24, 1930; Chicago, Illinois, U.S.
- Died: January 12, 2010 (aged 79); San Clemente, California
- Education: Chicago Teachers College

Coaching career (HC unless noted)

Men's basketball
- 1956–1964: Long Beach Polytechnic HS
- 1964–1966: USC (freshmen)
- 1966–1975: Riverside JC
- 1975–1980: Saddleback College
- 1980–1991: UC Irvine
- 1992–1995: Irvine Valley

Head coaching record
- Overall: 151–24 (.863) (High school); 384–161 (.705) (Junior college); 163–156 (.511) (NCAA Division I)

Accomplishments and honors

Championships
- 9x Mission Conference champion

Awards
- Mission Conference Coach of the Year (1975); PCAA Coach of the Year (1986)

William G. Mulligan (February 24, 1930 – January 12, 2010) was an American basketball coach who was the head coach of the UC Irvine Anteaters men's basketball team from 1980 to 1991.

== Early career ==
Mulligan graduated from the Chicago Teachers College in 1952. From 1956 to 1964, he compiled an overall record of 151–24 as the basketball coach at Long Beach Polytechnic High School. In 1964, he was named the freshman and assistant varsity coach for the USC Trojans men's basketball team. His freshman teams went 32–13 in his two seasons at the helm. He left the school in 1966 after he was passed up for the head coaching job in favor of Bob Boyd.

== Junior college ==
In 1966, Mulligan succeeded Jerry Tarkanian at Riverside Junior College. He led the Tigers to five conference titles in nine seasons and was named Mission Conference coach of the year in 1975. From 1975 to 1980, he led Saddleback College to an 134–20 record and four consecutive Mission Conference championships. The Gauchos made it to the state junior college championship game in 1979, but lost to Orange Coast College.

== UC Irvine ==
In 1979, Mulligan accepted the head coaching job at Loyola Marymount, but resigned after four days because the position would require extended absences from his son, who had cerebral palsy. In 1980, he was a head coaching candidate at three schools – Cal State Fullerton, UC Irvine, and South Florida. On February 26, 1980, the Los Angeles Times reported that Mulligan had accepted the position at Cal State Fullerton and an official announcement would be made later that week. The following day, the Times reported that Mulligan had never received an official offer from the school and he had "changed his mind". On March 1, he was announced as UC Irvine's next head coach.

Following Mulligan from Saddleback was one of the nation's most sought after junior college players, Kevin Magee. The Anteaters went 40–17 in Magee's two years at the school and appeared in the 1982 National Invitation Tournament. The 1985–86 Anteaters, led by Tod Murphy, Johnny Rogers, Scott Brooks, and Wayne Englestad, went 17–13 and appeared in the 1986 National Invitation Tournament. Mulligan also coached future National Basketball Association players Ben McDonald, Bob Thornton, Ronnie Grandison, and Tom Tolbert during his time at UC Irvine. Mulligan resigned in 1991 after three consecutive losing seasons. He left with a career record of 163–156.

== Irvine Valley ==
In 1992, Mulligan became the first head basketball coach at Irvine Valley College. He led the Lasers to the playoffs in their first two seasons. He suffered a minor stroke in 1994, but returned to the team for its first season in its new gym. Irvine Valley, led by all-state Keon Clark, went 22–12 in 1994–95 and won its first ever playoff. Mulligan retired at the end of the season.

== Later life ==
Mulligan was inducted into the UCI Athletics Hall of Fame in 1998 and the California Community College Athletic Association Hall of Fame in 2005. He died on January 12, 2010 in San Clemente, California from complications from pneumonia.
