= Eddie Sutton =

American college basketball coach (1936–2020)

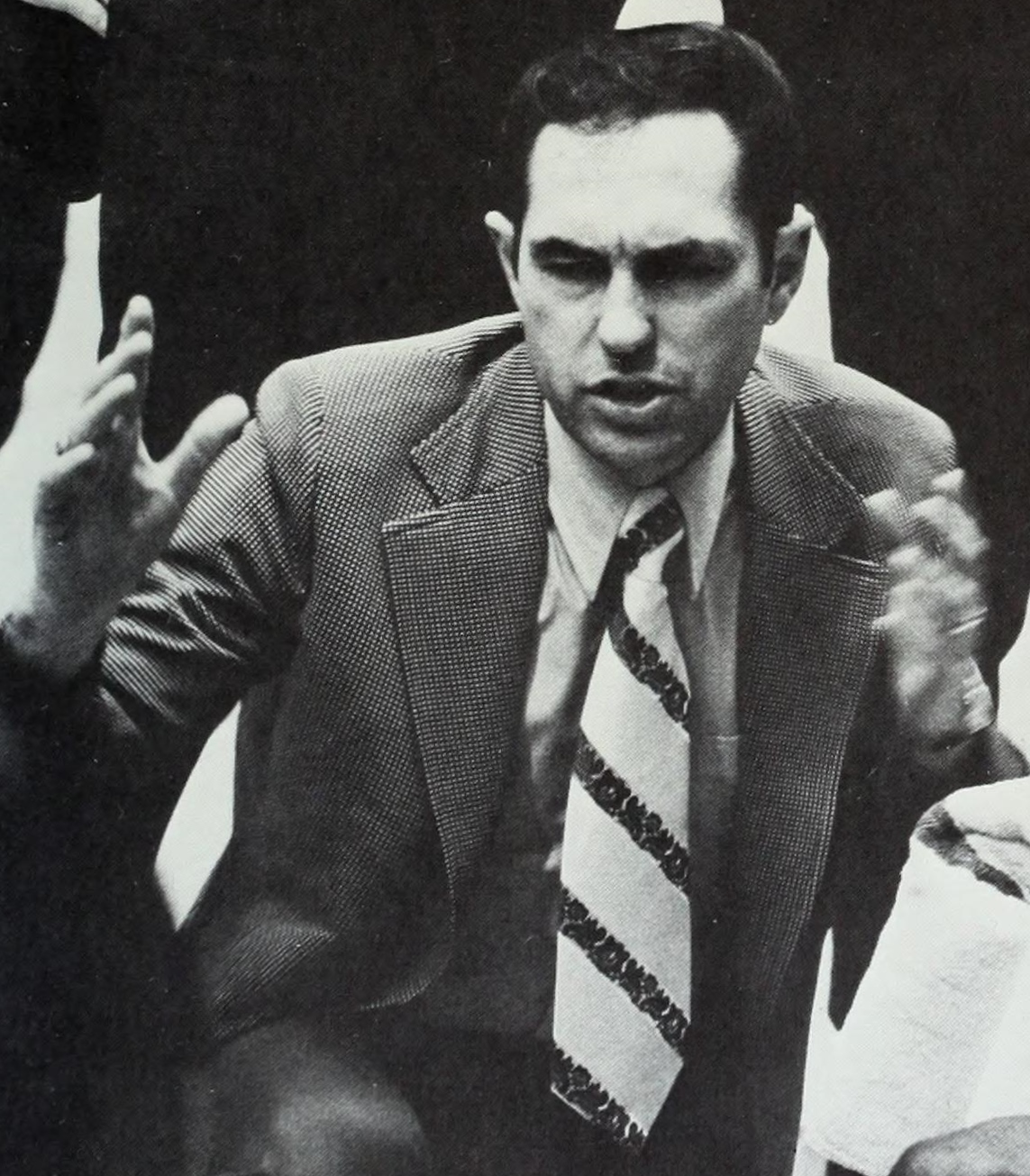
- Sutton as Creighton head coach, circa 1970

Biographical details
- Born: March 12, 1936; Bucklin, Kansas, U.S.
- Died: May 23, 2020 (aged 84); Tulsa, Oklahoma, U.S.

Playing career
- 1955–1958: Oklahoma State
- Position: Guard

Coaching career (HC unless noted)
- 1958–1959: Oklahoma State (assistant)
- 1959–1966: Tulsa Central HS (OK)
- 1966–1969: College of Southern Idaho
- 1969–1974: Creighton
- 1974–1985: Arkansas
- 1985–1989: Kentucky
- 1990–2006: Oklahoma State
- 2007–2008: San Francisco (interim)

Head coaching record
- Overall: 806–326 (college); 84–14 (junior college)

Accomplishments and honors

Championships
- 3 NCAA Division I regional – Final Four (1978, 1995, 2004); 5 SWC regular season (1977–1979, 1981, 1982); 3 SWC tournament (1977, 1979, 1982); 2 SEC regular season (1986, 1988); 2 SEC tournament (1986, 1988); Big Eight regular season (1991); Big Eight tournament (1995); Big 12 regular season (2004); 2 Big 12 tournament (2004, 2005)

Awards
- 2× AP College Coach of the Year (1978, 1986); NABC Coach of the Year (1986); Henry Iba Award (1977); 4× SWC Coach of the Year (1975, 1977, 1979, 1981); SEC Coach of the Year (1986); Big Eight Coach of the Year (1993); 2× Big 12 Coach of the Year (1998, 2004)
- Basketball Hall of Fame; Inducted in 2020
- College Basketball Hall of Fame; Inducted in 2011

Edward Eugene Sutton (March 12, 1936 – May 23, 2020) was an American college basketball coach. A native of Bucklin, Kansas, Sutton played college basketball at Oklahoma A&M (later Oklahoma State) and was a head coach at the high school, junior college, and college levels spanning six decades.

After beginning his coaching career as a graduate assistant at Oklahoma State under Henry Iba, Sutton was a successful head coach at Tulsa Central High School and the College of Southern Idaho. Sutton began coaching at the NCAA level in 1969 at Creighton University, followed by Arkansas from 1974 to 1985, Kentucky from 1985 to 1989, and Oklahoma State from 1990 to 2006. For part of the 2007–08 season, Sutton was interim head coach at San Francisco. During his college coaching career, Sutton is one of only eight NCAA Division I coaches to have had more than 800 career wins. From 1977 to 2005, Sutton's teams appeared in all but two NCAA Tournaments. Sutton was inducted into the College Basketball Hall of Fame in 2011 and Basketball Hall of Fame in 2020.

== Early life and education ==
Sutton was born in Bucklin, Kansas. After graduating from Bucklin High School in 1954, Sutton enrolled at what was then Oklahoma A&M College, which became Oklahoma State University–Stillwater in 1957. At Oklahoma A&M/State, Sutton played at guard for the Cowboys basketball team from 1955 to 1958 under head coach Henry Iba. In his junior season of 1956–57, Sutton led the Oklahoma A&M Cowboys in free throw percentage at .843. As a senior in 1957–58, Sutton averaged 8.3 points and was part of a team that qualified for the NCAA tournament. Sutton graduated from Oklahoma State with a bachelor's degree in 1958.

== Coaching career ==
=== Early coaching career (1958–1969) ===
Sutton began his coaching career as a graduate assistant for Iba at Oklahoma State in the 1958–59 school year before completing his master's degree in 1959. From 1959 to 1966, Sutton was head varsity basketball coach at Tulsa Central High School in Tulsa, Oklahoma, where he had a cumulative record of 119–51. Moving up to the junior college level, Sutton became the first head coach at the College of Southern Idaho from 1966 to 1969, with a cumulative 83–14 record.

=== Creighton (1969–1974) ===
From 1969 to 1974, Sutton was head coach at Creighton University, where he inherited a Bluejays program that had three consecutive losing seasons and led them to five consecutive winning seasons, including a 23–7 record and NCAA tournament appearance in the 1973–74 season.

=== Arkansas (1974–1985) ===
In 1974, Sutton became head coach at the University of Arkansas. Inheriting an Arkansas Razorbacks program that had losing records in three of the last four seasons and no postseason appearances since 1958, Sutton compiled a record of 260-75 from 1974 to 1985, including five Southwest Conference regular season championships, nine NCAA Tournament appearances, and a Final Four appearance in 1978.

His success led Arkansas to expand its home basketball venue, Barnhill Arena, from 5,200 seats to 9,000. Sutton also coached a trio of basketball players, all from the state of Arkansas, known as "The Triplets": Ron Brewer, Marvin Delph, and Sidney Moncrief.

On February 12, 1984, Arkansas had a 65–64 upset win over an undefeated, no. 1 North Carolina team that featured Michael Jordan, Sam Perkins and Brad Daugherty. The game took place at the Pine Bluff Convention Center in Pine Bluff, Arkansas, and NBC Sports televised the game nationally. Arkansas finished the 1983–84 season with a 23–7 record and no. 8 AP Poll ranking. Number 2 seed Arkansas lost to number 7 seed Virginia 53–51 in overtime in the NCAA tournament. In Sutton's final season as head coach in 1984–85, Arkansas went 22–13 and qualified for the second round of the NCAA tournament.

=== Kentucky (1985–1989) ===
On April 2, 1985, the University of Kentucky hired Sutton as head coach of the Kentucky Wildcats to replace Joe B. Hall. In a prepared statement, Hall said: "...with Eddie, I see nothing but great days ahead."

He coached the Wildcats for four years, leading them to the Elite Eight of the 1986 NCAA tournament. Two seasons later, Sutton and the 25–5 Wildcats captured their 37th SEC title (which was later vacated by the SEC) and were ranked as the No. 6 college basketball team in the nation by the Associated Press and UPI before being upset as the No. 2 seed in the Southeast Regional by Villanova in the 1988 NCAA tournament.

Sutton's tenure at Kentucky ended at the close of the 1988–89 season after a scandal and a losing record tarnished the school's basketball program. Kentucky entered the 1988–89 season lacking significant talent in their lineup. The previous season's offensive and defensive stars Ed Davender, Rob Lock and Winston Bennett had all graduated from school, while All-SEC sophomore Rex Chapman left school early to enter the 1988 NBA draft. Additionally, sophomore standout Eric Manuel was suspected of cheating on his college entrance exam and voluntarily agreed to sit out until the investigation was finished. Potential star recruit Shawn Kemp transferred out of Kentucky after signing with the school early that year. As it turned out, Manuel didn't play a single game as the investigation dragged through the entire season, essentially placing the Wildcats in the hands of inexperienced sophomore LeRon Ellis and freshman Chris Mills. The two underclassmen struggled to fill the talent vacuum on the court and the Wildcats finished with a losing record of 13–19, the team's first losing full-season record since 1927.

The scandal broke when it was alleged that Emery Worldwide employees discovered $1,000 in cash in an envelope Kentucky assistant coach Dwane Casey supposedly sent to Mills' father. It was later shown that Casey was uninvolved in the Emery envelope incident.

The NCAA announced at the end of the season that its investigation into the basketball program had found the school guilty of violating numerous NCAA policies. The NCAA deemed the violations so egregious that it seriously considered hitting the Wildcats with the "death penalty", which would have shut down the entire basketball program (as opposed to simply being banned from postseason play) for up to two years. Kentucky was eligible for this severe penalty because it was already on probation for failing to cooperate with an investigation into an extensive scheme of payments to recruits.

By then, Sutton was already gone. In March, school president David Roselle told Sutton that he had lined up enough support on UK's athletics board to fire him unless he resigned. Rather than face all-but-certain termination, Sutton resigned. Athletic director Cliff Hagan resigned as well. The Wildcats were slapped with three years' probation, a two-year ban from postseason play and a ban from live television in 1989–90. Manuel was also banned from ever playing again for any NCAA member school.

=== Oklahoma State (1990–2006) ===
After a year away from the game, Sutton returned to his alma mater, Oklahoma State, on April 11, 1990. He inherited a program that had fallen on hard times. At the time of his hire, since joining (or rejoining, depending on the source) the Big Eight Conference in 1957, Oklahoma State appeared in only three NCAA Tournaments. Previous Oklahoma State head coach Leonard Hamilton had also resigned to take the job at the University of Miami.

In his first season at Oklahoma State, Sutton led the Cowboys to a 24–8 record, Big Eight regular season title, and Sweet 16 appearance in the 1991 NCAA tournament. In the 1991–92 season, Oklahoma State improved to 28–8 and made it to a second straight Sweet 16, followed by two more NCAA Tournament appearances in 1993 and 1994.

In Sutton's fifth season, the 1994–95 Oklahoma State team, led by Bryant Reeves (also known as "Big Country") and Randy Rutherford, won the Big Eight tournament and advanced to the Final Four for the first time since 1951. Following the season, The Oklahoman sports columnist Berry Tramel observed: "Sutton is pleased that pride has returned to the court made famous by Iba." Reeves went on to be selected sixth overall in the 1995 NBA draft.

Sutton continued to coach Oklahoma State following the school's move from the Big Eight to Big 12 Conference in 1996.

Oklahoma State's best season under Sutton was in 2003–04. With the roster including a significant number of transfers, Oklahoma State had a 31–4 overall record that tied the school record for overall wins in addition to gaining Big 12 regular season and tournament titles and the school's second Final Four appearance under Sutton. The 2003–04 team included junior college transfer Tony Allen, who would go on to be the 25th overall pick in the 2004 NBA draft and a six-time All-Defensive honoree in the NBA.

On January 15, 2005, the court at Oklahoma State's home arena, Gallagher-Iba Arena, was officially renamed Eddie Sutton Court.

On February 10, 2006, Sutton was involved in a car accident in Stillwater. He was cited for driving under the influence. Witnesses said that Sutton fell and hit his head at the Gallagher-Iba Arena parking lot, and The Oklahoman reported that campus police officers and athletic department physicians helped Sutton into his university-provided Dodge Durango. After declining a police officer's offer for a ride or ambulance, Sutton hit another SUV from behind at 60 mph, resulting in minor injuries for the other driver. Following the accident, Sutton's blood alcohol level was measured at .22, nearly three times the legal limit of .08.

Sutton announced on February 14 that he would take a medical leave of absence from the basketball team, citing his health problems and the accident as reasons. Assistant coach and son Sean Sutton served as acting head coach for the remainder of the season. The following day, in a prepared statement delivered over the phone at a press conference, Sutton admitted he had taken prescription medication due to back pain and "bought a bottle" of alcohol on the night of the accident. Sutton went on to say: "I have a problem with alcohol. That said, I make no excuses for what has happened. I recognize it and I will be seeking treatment for it. I know I have let many people down."

Sutton eventually resigned as head coach May 19, 2006, succeeded by Sean Sutton. In 16 seasons, Sutton had a 368–151 record at Oklahoma State with 13 NCAA Tournament appearances, two regular season conference titles (Big Eight in 1991, Big 12 in 2004), and three conference tournament titles (Big Eight in 1995, Big 12 in 2004 and 2005).

=== San Francisco (2007–2008) ===
On December 26, 2007, Sutton came out of retirement to replace Jessie Evans as head coach at the University of San Francisco on an interim basis.

On February 2, 2008, Sutton became the fifth NCAA Division I men's basketball coach to reach 800 career wins after San Francisco rallied from a 19-point second half deficit to defeat Pepperdine 85–82 in an away game. San Francisco concluded the season with an overall 10–21 record, including 6–13 under Sutton. Following the season, San Francisco hired Rex Walters as head coach.

== Head coaching record ==
=== Junior college ===
Record table
Season	Team	Overall	Conference	Standing	Postseason
Southern Idaho Golden Eagles (NJCAA Region 1) (1966–1968)
1966–67	Southern Idaho	33–4			AAU
1967–68	Southern Idaho	24–6			
Southern Idaho Golden Eagles (NJCAA Region 18) (1968–1969)
1968–69	Southern Idaho	27–4			
Southern Idaho:		84–14 (.857)			
Total:		84–14 (.857)			

=== College ===
Record table
Season	Team	Overall	Conference	Standing	Postseason
Creighton Bluejays (NCAA University Division / Division I independent) (1969–1974)
1969–70	Creighton	15–10			
1970–71	Creighton	14–11			
1971–72	Creighton	15–11			
1972–73	Creighton	15–11			
1973–74	Creighton	23–7			NCAA Division I Regional Third Place
Creighton:		82–50 (.621)			
Arkansas Razorbacks (Southwest Conference) (1974–1985)
1974–75	Arkansas	17–9	11–3	2nd	
1975–76	Arkansas	19–9	9–7	4th	
1976–77	Arkansas	26–2	16–0	1st	NCAA Division I First Round
1977–78	Arkansas	32–4	14–2	T–1st	NCAA Division I Final Four
1978–79	Arkansas	25–5	13–3	T–1st	NCAA Division I Elite Eight
1979–80	Arkansas	21–8	13–3	2nd	NCAA Division I First Round
1980–81	Arkansas	24–8	13–3	1st	NCAA Division I Sweet 16
1981–82	Arkansas	23–6	12–4	1st	NCAA Division I Second Round
1982–83	Arkansas	26–4	14–2	2nd	NCAA Division I Sweet 16
1983–84	Arkansas	25–7	14–2	2nd	NCAA Division I Second Round
1984–85	Arkansas	22–13	10–6	2nd	NCAA Division I Second Round
Arkansas:		260–75 (.776)	139–35 (.799)		
Kentucky Wildcats (Southeastern Conference) (1985–1989)
1985–86	Kentucky	32–4	17–1	1st	NCAA Division I Elite Eight
1986–87	Kentucky	18–11	10–8	T–3rd	NCAA Division I First Round
1987–88*	Kentucky	27–6	13–5	1st	NCAA Division I Sweet 16
1988–89**	Kentucky	13–19	8–10	T–6th	
Kentucky:		88–39 (.693)	48–24 (.667)		
Oklahoma State Cowboys (Big Eight Conference) (1990–1996)
1990–91	Oklahoma State	24–8	10–4	T–1st	NCAA Division I Sweet 16
1991–92	Oklahoma State	28–8	8–6	2nd	NCAA Division I Sweet 16
1992–93	Oklahoma State	20–9	8–6	2nd	NCAA Division I Second Round
1993–94	Oklahoma State	24–10	10–4	2nd	NCAA Division I Second Round
1994–95	Oklahoma State	27–10	10–4	2nd	NCAA Division I Final Four
1995–96	Oklahoma State	17–10	7–7	4th	
Oklahoma State Cowboys (Big 12 Conference) (1996–2006)
1996–97***	Oklahoma State	19–13	7–9	6th	NIT Second Round
1997–98	Oklahoma State	22–7	11–5	T–2nd	NCAA Division I Second Round
1998–99	Oklahoma State	23–11	10–6	5th	NCAA Division I Second Round
1999–00	Oklahoma State	27–7	12–4	T–3rd	NCAA Division I Elite Eight
2000–01	Oklahoma State	20–10	10–6	5th	NCAA Division I First Round
2001–02	Oklahoma State	23–9	10–6	T–3rd	NCAA Division I First Round
2002–03	Oklahoma State	22–10	10–6	4th	NCAA Division I Second Round
2003–04	Oklahoma State	31–4	14–2	1st	NCAA Division I Final Four
2004–05	Oklahoma State	26–7	11–5	3rd	NCAA Division I Sweet 16
2005–06	Oklahoma State	17–16	6–10	7th	NIT First Round
Oklahoma State:		368–151 (.709)	153–90 (.630)		
San Francisco Dons (West Coast Conference) (2007–2008)
2007–08	San Francisco	6–13	5–9	5th	
San Francisco:		6–13 (.316)	5–9 (.357)		
Total:		804–328 (.710)			
National champion Postseason invitational champion Conference regular season champion Conference regular season and conference tournament champion Division regular season champion Division regular season and conference tournament champion Conference tournament champion

*Kentucky vacated the 1987–88 SEC regular season and tournament titles as well as its NCAA Tournament appearance after Eric Manuel was found to be academically ineligible.

**Due to sanctions from recruiting violations, Sutton and his entire staff were forced to resign following the 1988–89 season.

*** Includes wins that resulted from Texas Tech win forfeitures

== Personal life ==
Eddie Sutton was married to Patsy Wright from 1958 until her death in 2013. They had three children and six grandchildren. Two of Sutton's children would become college basketball coaches. Sean Sutton coached at Oklahoma State for 15 seasons, first as an assistant under his father from 1993 to 2006 then as head coach from 2006 to 2008, before serving as an assistant coach at Oral Roberts University from 2011 to 2017 and a special advisor to head coach Chris Beard at Texas Tech since 2017. Scott Sutton played for Oklahoma State from 1992 to 1994, was head coach at Oral Roberts from 1999 to 2017, and has been an assistant coach at Oklahoma State since 2017.

In his final years, Sutton lived in southern Tulsa, Oklahoma. On May 23, 2020, Sutton died in Tulsa at age 84, after being in hospice care.

== See also ==
- List of college men's basketball coaches with 600 wins
- List of NCAA Division I Men's Final Four appearances by coach
