= 1985–86 UNLV Runnin' Rebels basketball team =

American college basketball season

1985–86 UNLV Runnin' Rebels basketball

PCAA tournament champions PCAA regular season champions

NCAA tournament, Sweet Sixteen
- Conference: Pacific Coast Athletic Association

Ranking
- Coaches: No. 10
- AP: No. 11
- Record: 33–5 (16–2 PCAA)
- Head coach: Jerry Tarkanian (13th season)
- Assistant coaches: Tim Grgurich; Mark Warkentien; Cleveland Edwards
- Home arena: Thomas & Mack Center

1985–86 Pacific Coast Athletic Association men's basketball standings
	Conf.				Overall
Team	W		L	PCT	W		L	PCT
No. 11 UNLV †	16	–	2	.889	33	–	5	.868
UC Irvine	12	–	6	.667	17	–	13	.567
New Mexico State	10	–	8	.556	18	–	12	.600
San Jose State	9	–	9	.500	16	–	12	.571
Pacific	9	–	9	.500	17	–	14	.548
Cal State Fullerton	8	–	10	.444	16	–	16	.500
Fresno State	8	–	10	.444	15	–	15	.500
Utah State	8	–	10	.444	12	–	16	.429
UC Santa Barbara	7	–	11	.389	12	–	15	.444
Long Beach State	3	–	15	.167	7	–	22	.241
† 1986 PCAA tournament winner

The 1985–86 UNLV Runnin' Rebels basketball team represented the University of Nevada Las Vegas in NCAA Division I men's competition in the 1985–86 season under head coach Jerry Tarkanian. The team played its home games in the Thomas & Mack Center, and was a member of the Pacific Coast Athletic Association (PCAA), now known as the Big West Conference. The Rebels won the regular season conference and PCAA tournament titles. The team finished with a record of 33–5 (16–2 PCAA) and reached the Sweet Sixteen of the NCAA tournament.

== Roster ==
1985–86 UNLV Runnin' Rebels men's basketball team
Players
Coaches

Pos.	#	Name	Height	Weight	Year	Hometown
G/F	11	Anthony Jones	6 ft 6 in (1.98 m)	190 lb (86 kg)	Sr	Washington, D.C.
G	13	Freddie Banks	6 ft 2 in (1.88 m)	155 lb (70 kg)	Jr	Las Vegas, Nevada
F	30	Leon Symanski	6 ft 7 in (2.01 m)	210 lb (95 kg)	Jr	Orange, California
G	32	Gary Graham	6 ft 4 in (1.93 m)	185 lb (84 kg)	Jr	Baltimore, Maryland
G/F	33	Eldridge Hudson	6 ft 6 in (1.98 m)	215 lb (98 kg)	Jr	Carson, California
F/C	35	Armon Gilliam	6 ft 9 in (2.06 m)	225 lb (102 kg)	Jr	Pittsburgh, Pennsylvania

Head coach

- Jerry Tarkanian (Fresno State)

Assistant coach(es)

- Tim Grgurich (Pittsburgh)
- Mark Warkentien (Cal State Fullerton)
- Ralph Readout (Ohio)

Legend

- (C) Team captain
- (S) Suspended
- (I) Ineligible
- (W) Walk-on
- Injured
- Current redshirt

Roster

== Schedule and results ==
Date time, TV	Rank^{#}	Opponent^{#}	Result	Record	Site (attendance) city, state
Regular season
Nov 22, 1985*	No. 18	Nevada	W 89–62	1–0	Thomas & Mack Center; Paradise, Nevada
Nov 25, 1985*	No. 16	South Carolina	W 73–55	2–0	Thomas & Mack Center; Paradise, Nevada
Nov 29, 1985*	No. 16	vs. Villanova; Great Alaska Shootout	W 61–49	3–0	Sullivan Arena; Anchorage, Alaska
Nov 30, 1985*	No. 16	vs. Arizona; Great Alaska Shootout	W 60–59	4–0	Sullivan Arena; Anchorage, Alaska
Dec 1, 1985*	No. 16	vs. No. 1 North Carolina; Great Alaska Shootout	L 60–65	4–1	Sullivan Arena; Anchorage, Alaska
Dec 7, 1985*	No. 14	at Maryland	W 64–63 ^{OT}	5–1	Cole Fieldhouse; College Park, Maryland
Dec 14, 1985*	No. 13	at Nevada	W 74–52	6–1	Lawlor Events Center; Reno, Nevada
Dec 20, 1985*	No. 12	San Diego State	W 105–85	7–1	Thomas & Mack Center; Paradise, Nevada
Dec 21, 1985*	No. 12	Iona	W 82–63	8–1	Thomas & Mack Center; Paradise, Nevada
Dec 24, 1985*	No. 12	vs. Stanford	W 83–65	9–1	Neil S. Blaisdell Center; Honolulu, Hawaii
Dec 25, 1985*	No. 12	vs. NC State	L 73–80	9–2	Neil S. Blaisdell Center; Honolulu, Hawaii
Dec 27, 1985*	No. 12	Ball State; Budweiser Holiday Classic	W 88–71	10–2	Thomas & Mack Center; Las Vegas, Nevada
Dec 28, 1985*	No. 12	No. 14 UAB; Budweiser Holiday Classic	W 73–72	11–2	Thomas & Mack Center (17,980); Las Vegas, Nevada
Jan 2, 1986	No. 13	Utah State	W 100-94	12–2	Thomas & Mack Center; Las Vegas, Nevada
Jan 4, 1986	No. 13	San Jose State	W 106-80	13–2	Thomas & Mack Center; Las Vegas, Nevada
Jan 9, 1986	No. 12	at Pacific	W 85-80	14–2	Alex G. Spanos Center; Stockton, California
Jan 12, 1986	No. 12	at Fresno State	W 68-53	15–2	Selland Arena; Fresno, California
Jan 16, 1986	No. 10	UC Santa Barbara	W 79-71	16–2	Thomas & Mack Center; Las Vegas, Nevada
Jan 18, 1986	No. 10	at Cal State Fullerton	W 62-51	17–2	Titan Gym; Fullerton, California
Jan 23, 1986	No. 10	New Mexico State	W 92-75	18–2	Thomas & Mack Center; Las Vegas, Nevada
Jan 25, 1986	No. 10	Long Beach State	W 72-65	19–2	Thomas & Mack Center; Las Vegas, Nevada
Jan 30, 1986	No. 10	at San Jose State	W 62-55	20–2	San Jose Civic Auditorium; San Jose, California
Feb 1, 1986	No. 10	at Utah State	W 87-79	21–2	Dee Glen Smith Spectrum; Logan, Utah
Feb 6, 1986	No. 9	Pacific	W 92-73	22–2	Thomas & Mack Center; Las Vegas, Nevada
Feb 7, 1986*	No. 9	No. 3 Memphis State	W 67–66	23–2	Thomas & Mack Center; Paradise, Nevada
Feb 8, 1986	No. 9	Fresno State	W 72-56	24–2	Thomas & Mack Center; Las Vegas, Nevada
Feb 15, 1986	No. 6	UC Irvine	L 92-99	24–3	Thomas & Mack Center; Las Vegas, Nevada
Feb 17, 1986	No. 11	Cal State Fullerton	W 92-83	25-3	Thomas & Mack Center; Las Vegas, Nevada
Feb 20, 1986	No. 11	at New Mexico State	W 88-79	26-3	Pan American Center; Las Cruces, New Mexico
Feb 22, 1986	No. 11	at UC Santa Barbara	W 79-65	27-3	The Thunderdome; Santa Barbara, California
Feb 27, 1986	No. 9	at UC Irvine	L 88-95	27-4	Crawford Hall; Irvine, California
Mar 1, 1986*	No. 9	at Long Beach State	W 94–76	28–4	The Gold Mine; Long Beach, California
PCAA tournament
Mar 6, 1986*	No. 13	vs. Fresno State; Quarterfinals	W 68–49	29–4	The Forum; Inglewood, California
Mar 7, 1986*	No. 13	vs. Cal State Fullerton; Semifinals	W 75–65	30–4	The Forum; Inglewood, California
Mar 8, 1986*	No. 13	vs. New Mexico State; Championship game	W 75–55	31–4	The Forum; Inglewood, California
NCAA tournament
Mar 14, 1986*	(4 W) No. 11	vs. (13 W) Northeast Louisiana; First round	W 74–51	32–4	Long Beach Arena; Long Beach, California
Mar 16, 1986*	(4 W) No. 11	vs. (5 W) Maryland; Second round	W 70–64	33–4	Long Beach Arena; Long Beach, California
Mar 20, 1986*	(4 W) No. 11	vs. (8 W) Auburn; West Regional semifinal – Sweet Sixteen	L 63–70	33–5	The Summit; Houston, Texas
*Non-conference game. ^{#}Rankings from AP poll. (#) Tournament seedings in parentheses. W=West.

== Rankings ==
Ranking movements Legend: ██ Increase in ranking ██ Decrease in ranking
	Week																
Poll	Pre	1	2	3	4	5	6	7	8	9	10	11	12	13	14	15	Final
AP	18	16	14	13	12	12	13	12	10	10	10	9	6	11	9	13	11
Coaches	18	18^	9	10	10	12	13	12	10	10	11	9	4	11	7	11	10

== Awards and honors ==
- Anthony Jones – co–PCAA Player of the Year

== See also ==
- UNLV Runnin' Rebels basketball
- 1986 NCAA Division I men's basketball tournament
