= 1985–86 Arizona Wildcats men's basketball team =

American college basketball season

1985–86 Arizona Wildcats men's basketball

Pac-10 Champions

NCAA tournament, first round
- Conference: Pacific-10
- Record: 23–9 (14–4 Pac-10)
- Head coach: Lute Olson (3rd season)
- Assistant coaches: Tom Billeter (1st season); Ricky Byrdsong (4th season); Scott Thompson (3rd season)
- Home arena: McKale Center (Capacity: 14,545)

1985–86 Pacific-10 Conference men's basketball standings
	Conf.				Overall
Team	W		L	PCT	W		L	PCT
Arizona	14	–	4	.778	23	–	9	.719
Washington	13	–	5	.722	19	–	12	.613
California	11	–	7	.611	19	–	10	.655
UCLA	9	–	9	.500	15	–	14	.517
Arizona State	8	–	10	.444	14	–	14	.500
Washington State	8	–	10	.444	15	–	16	.484
Stanford	8	–	10	.444	14	–	16	.467
Oregon State	8	–	10	.444	12	–	15	.444
Oregon	6	–	12	.333	11	–	17	.393
USC	5	–	13	.278	11	–	17	.393
As of March 25, 1986; Rankings from AP Poll

The 1985–86 Arizona Wildcats men's basketball team represented the University of Arizona during the 1985–86 NCAA Division I men's basketball season. The head coach was Lute Olson. The team played its home games in the McKale Center in Tucson, Arizona, and was a member of the Pacific-10 Conference. The Wildcats won the Pac-10 regular season title, finished with an overall record of 23–9 (14–4 Pac-10), and reached the NCAA tournament, but lost in the opening round for the second straight season.

== Roster ==
1985–86 Arizona Wildcats men's basketball team
Players
Coaches

Pos.	#	Name	Height	Weight	Year	Previous school	Hometown
F	00	Anthony Cook	6 ft 9 in (2.06 m)	200 lb (91 kg)	Fr	Van Nuys HS	Los Angeles, CA
PG	11	Kenny Lofton	6 ft 0 in (1.83 m)	180 lb (82 kg)	Fr	Washington HS	East Chicago, IN
G	13	Rolf Jacobs	6 ft 7 in (2.01 m)	—	So	Fountain Valley HS	Fountain Valley, CA
G	20	Craig McMillan	6 ft 6 in (1.98 m)	—	So	Cloverdale HS	Cloverdale, CA
G	21	Eric Cooper	6 ft 4 in (1.93 m)	—	Fr	Banning HS	Los Angeles, CA
G	22	Bruce Fraser	6 ft 5 in (1.96 m)	172 lb (78 kg)	Jr	Long Beach City College	Long Beach, CA
F	24	David Haskin	6 ft 5 in (1.96 m)	—	Sr	Sahuaro HS	Tucson, AZ
G	25	Steve Kerr	6 ft 3 in (1.91 m)	175 lb (79 kg)	Jr	Palisades Charter HS	Los Angeles, CA
SF	32	Sean Elliott	6 ft 8 in (2.03 m)	210 lb (95 kg)	Fr	Cholla HS	Tucson, AZ
F	33	Joe Turner	6 ft 9 in (2.06 m)	—	So	Foothill HS	Bakersfield, CA
C	34	Brian David	6 ft 9 in (2.06 m)	—	Fr	Kuemper HS	Templeton, IA
C	45	Bruce Wheatley	6 ft 8 in (2.03 m)	—	Fr	Nogales HS	Los Angeles, CA
G	50	John Edgar	6 ft 6 in (1.98 m)	—	Sr	Los Angeles City College	Los Angeles, CA

Head coach

- Lute Olson (Augsburg)

Assistant coach(es)

- Tom Billeter
- Ricky Byrdsong
- Scott Thompson

Legend

- (C) Team captain
- (S) Suspended
- (I) Ineligible
- (W) Walk-on
- Injured
- Current redshirt

== Schedule and results ==
Date time, TV	Rank^{#}	Opponent^{#}	Result	Record	Site (attendance) city, state
Non-conference regular season
Nov 29, 1985*		vs. Texas-San Antonio; Great Alaska Shootout	W 62–49	1–0	Sullivan Arena; Anchorage, Alaska
Nov 30, 1985*		vs. No. 16 UNLV; Great Alaska Shootout	L 59–60	1–1	Sullivan Arena; Anchorage, Alaska
Dec 1, 1985*		vs. Purdue; Great Alaska Shootout	L 74–81	1–2	Sullivan Arena; Anchorage, Alaska
Dec 4, 1985*		Denver	W 63–54	2–2	McKale Center; Tucson, Arizona
Dec 7, 1985*		Northern Arizona	W 66–57	3–2	McKale Center; Tucson, Arizona
Dec 10, 1985*		at Tulsa	L 51–54	3–3	Tulsa Convention Center; Tulsa, Oklahoma
Dec 12, 1985*		San Diego State	W 72–66	4–3	McKale Center; Tucson, Arizona
Dec 14, 1985*		New Mexico	W 70–55	5–3	McKale Center; Tucson, Arizona
Dec 21, 1985*		at Utah	L 68–76	5–4	Jon M. Huntsman Center; Salt Lake City, Utah
Dec 27, 1985*		Princeton	W 54–41	6–4	McKale Center; Tucson, Arizona
Dec 28, 1985*		Boston College	W 71–61	7–4	McKale Center; Tucson, Arizona
Jan 2, 1986*		Hawaii–Hilo	W 104–71	8–4	McKale Center; Tucson, Arizona
Pac-10 regular season
Jan 4, 1986		Arizona State; Rivalry	W 62–53	9–4 (1–0)	McKale Center; Tucson, Arizona
Jan 9, 1986		Stanford	W 77–69	10–4 (2–0)	McKale Center; Tucson, Arizona
Jan 12, 1986		California	W 79–72 ^{2OT}	11–4 (3–0)	McKale Center; Tucson, Arizona
Jan 16, 1986		USC	L 62–63	11–5 (3–1)	Los Angeles Memorial Sports Arena; Los Angeles, California
Jan 18, 1986*		at Miami	W 81–74 ^{OT}	12–5	Knight Center Complex; Miami, Florida
Jan 23, 1986		Oregon State	W 63–62 ^{ot}	13–5 (4–1)	McKale Center; Tucson, Arizona
Jan 25, 1986		Oregon	W 85–68	14–5 (5–1)	McKale Center; Tucson, Arizona
Jan 30, 1986		at Washington State	L 63–65 ^{OT}	14–6 (5–2)	Beasley Coliseum; Pullman, Washington
Feb 1, 1986		at Washington	W 70–57	15–6 (6–2)	Hec Edmundson Pavilion; Seattle, Washington
Feb 6, 1986		at California	W 79–72	16–6 (7–2)	Harmon Gym; Berkeley, California
Feb 8, 1986		at Stanford	L 56–62	16–7 (7–3)	Maples Pavilion; Stanford, California
Feb 13, 1986		UCLA; Rivalry	W 85–60	17–7 (8–3)	McKale Center; Tucson, Arizona
Feb 15, 1986		USC	W 71–62	18–7 (9–3)	McKale Center; Tucson, Arizona
Feb 20, 1986		at Oregon	W 65–59	19–7 (10–3)	McArthur Court; Eugene, Oregon
Feb 22, 1986		at Oregon State	W 55–53	20–7 (11–3)	Gill Coliseum; Corvallis, Oregon
Feb 27, 1986		Washington	W 77–56	21–7 (12–3)	McKale Center; Tucson, Arizona
March 1, 1986		Washington State	W 62–61	22–7 (13–3)	McKale Center; Tucson, Arizona
Mar 3, 1986		at UCLA; Rivalry	W 88–76	23–7 (14–3)	Pauley Pavilion; Los Angeles, California
Mar 9, 1986		at Arizona State; Rivalry	L 63–70	23–8 (14–4)	ASU Activity Center; Tempe, Arizona
NCAA Tournament
Mar 14, 1986*	(9 W)	vs. (8 W) Auburn; First Round	L 63–73	23–9	Long Beach Arena; Long Beach, California
*Non-conference game. ^{#}Rankings from AP Poll. (#) Tournament seedings in parentheses. W=West.
