= 1985–86 Auburn Tigers men's basketball team =

American college basketball season

1985–86 Auburn Tigers men's basketball

Red Lobster Classic champions

NCAA tournament, Elite Eight
- Conference: Southeastern Conference
- Record: 22–11 (13–5 SEC)
- Head coach: Sonny Smith (8th season)
- Home arena: Memorial Coliseum

1985–86 Southeastern Conference men's basketball standings
	Conf.				Overall
Team	W		L	PCT	W		L	PCT
No. 3 Kentucky †	17	–	1	.944	32	–	4	.889
Alabama	13	–	5	.722	24	–	9	.727
Auburn	13	–	5	.722	22	–	11	.667
Florida	10	–	8	.556	19	–	14	.576
LSU	9	–	9	.500	26	–	12	.684
Georgia	9	–	9	.500	17	–	13	.567
Vanderbilt	7	–	11	.389	13	–	15	.464
Tennessee	5	–	13	.278	12	–	16	.429
Ole Miss	4	–	14	.222	12	–	17	.414
Mississippi State	3	–	15	.167	6	–	22	.214
† 1986 SEC tournament winner Rankings from AP Poll

The 1985–86 Auburn Tigers men's basketball team represented Auburn University in the 1985–86 college basketball season. The team's head coach was Sonny Smith, who was in his eighth season at Auburn. The team played their home games at Memorial Coliseum in Auburn, Alabama. They finished the season 22–11, 13–5 in SEC play. They lost to Mississippi State in the quarterfinals of the SEC tournament. They received an at-large bid to the NCAA tournament where they defeated Arizona, St. John's, and UNLV to advance to the Elite Eight where they lost to Louisville.

The only real loss of note from the prior season for Auburn was starting center Carey Holland. Also, center Darren Guest would be found academically ineligible and eventually transfer. Key additions were freshman forward Mike Jones and guard Aundrae Davis, a sophomore transfer from West Virginia University who would not be eligible until the next season. Senior Chuck Person would have a stellar season and make several All-America teams.

== Roster ==
1985–86 Auburn Tigers men's basketball team
Players
Coaches

Pos.	#	Name	Height	Weight	Year	Previous school	Hometown
F	45	Chuck Person	6 ft 8 in (2.03 m)	—	Sr	Brantley High School	Brantley, AL
G	15	Frank Ford	6 ft 4 in (1.93 m)	—	Jr	Osceola High School	Kissimmee, Florida
F	34	Chris Morris	6 ft 7 in (2.01 m)	—	So	Frederick Douglass High School	Atlanta, Georgia
F	13	Mike Jones	6 ft 7 in (2.01 m)	—	Fr	Columbus, Georgia
C	40	Jeff Moore	6 ft 8 in (2.03 m)	—	So	Midfield High School	Midfield, Alabama
G	12	Gerald White	6 ft 1 in (1.85 m)	—	Jr	Richmond Academy	Augusta, Georgia
G	10	Terrence Howard	6 ft 1 in (1.85 m)	—	So	Southwest High School	Southwest, AL
G	14	Johnny Lynn	6 ft 3 in (1.91 m)	—	So	Beech High School	Hendersonville, Tennessee
F	31	Vern Strickland	6 ft 5 in (1.96 m)	—	Sr	Emma Sansom High School	Gadsden, Alabama
G	11	Melvin Haralson	6 ft 1 in (1.85 m)	—	Fr	Jackson, Mississippi
F	25	Gary Godfrey	6 ft 7 in (2.01 m)	—	Sr	North Shore High School	North Palm Beach, Florida

Head coach

- Sonny Smith (Milligan)

Assistant coach(es)

Legend

- (C) Team captain
- (S) Suspended
- (I) Ineligible
- (W) Walk-on
- Injured
- Current redshirt

== Schedule and results ==
Date time, TV	Rank^{#}	Opponent^{#}	Result	Record	Site (attendance) city, state
Regular season
Nov 22, 1985*	No. 10	vs. West Virginia; Big Apple NIT	L 58–75	0–1	Hartford Civic Center; Hartford, CT
Nov 26, 1985*	No. 19	Birmingham-Southern	W 61–51	1–1	Beard-Eaves Memorial Coliseum; Auburn, AL
Dec 3, 1985*	No. 19	West Virginia	W 84–59	2–1	Beard-Eaves Memorial Coliseum; Auburn, AL
Dec 6, 1985*	No. 19	vs. Kentucky Wesleyan; Wendy's Classic	W 80–71	3–1	E. A. Diddle Arena; Bowling Green, KY
Dec 7, 1985*	No. 19	vs. Western Kentucky; Wendy's Classic	L 58–71	3–2	E. A. Diddle Arena; Bowling Green, KY
Dec 10, 1985*		at No. 16 UAB	L 56–62	3–3	Birmingham-Jefferson Civic Center (15,502); Birmingham, AL
Dec 14, 1985*		vs. Stetson	W 77–54	4–3	Ocean Center; Daytona Beach, FL
Dec 17, 1985*		at Southwestern Louisiana	L 64–66	4–4	Cajundome; Lafayette, LA
Dec 22, 1985*		vs. Central Florida; Red Lobster Classic	W 78–49	5–4	Orange County Civic Center; Orlanda, FL
Dec 23, 1985*		vs. Boston College; Red Lobster Classic	W 89-85	6–4	Orange County Civic Center; Orlanda, FL
Jan 4, 1986		at Florida	L 59-62	6–5 (0–1)	Stephen C. O'Connell Center; Gainesville, FL
Jan 6, 1986		No. 11 Kentucky	W 60-56	7–5 (1–1)	Beard-Eaves Memorial Coliseum; Auburn, AL
Jan 8, 1986		Tennessee	W 55-45	8-5 (2-1)	Beard-Eaves Memorial Coliseum; Auburn, AL
Jan 11, 1986		at Mississippi State	W 72-56	9-5 (3-1)	Humphrey Coliseum; Starkville, MS
Jan 16, 1986		at Alabama	L 56-60	9-6 (3-2)	Coleman Coliseum; Tuscaloosa, AL
Jan 18, 1986		Georgia	W 84-69	10-6 (4-2)	Beard-Eaves Memorial Coliseum; Auburn, AL
Jan 22, 1986		at Mississippi	W 73-61	11-6 (5-2)	C.M. Tad Smith Coliseum; Oxford, MS
Jan 25, 1986		No. 14 LSU	L 61-63	11-7 (5-3)	Beard-Eaves Memorial Coliseum; Auburn, AL
Jan 29, 1986		Vanderbilt	W 97-70	12-7 (6-3)	Beard-Eaves Memorial Coliseum; Auburn, AL
Jan 31, 1986		at No. 8 Kentucky	L 71-81	12-8 (6-4)	Rupp Arena; Lexington, KY
Feb 6, 1986		Florida	W 67-65	13-8 (7-4)	Beard-Eaves Memorial Coliseum; Auburn, AL
Feb 8, 1986		at Tennessee	L 79-80	13-9 (7-5)	Stokely Center; Knoxville, TN
Feb 12, 1986		Mississippi State	W 69-64	14-9 (8-5)	Beard-Eaves Memorial Coliseum; Auburn, AL
Feb 15, 1986		No. 18 Alabama	W 71-69	15-9 (9-5)	Beard-Eaves Memorial Coliseum; Auburn, AL
Feb 19, 1986		at Georgia	W 87-86	16-9 (10-5)	Stegeman Coliseum; Athens, GA
Feb 22, 1986		Mississippi	W 75-73	17-9 (11-5)	Beard-Eaves Memorial Coliseum; Auburn, AL
Feb 26, 1986		at LSU	W 92-86	18-9 (12-5)	Maravich Assembly Center; Baton Rouge, LA
March 1, 1986		at Vanderbilt	W 79-65	19-9 (13-5)	Memorial Gymnasium; Nashville, TN
SEC Tournament
Mar 6, 1986; LSN	(2)	vs. (10) Mississippi State; Quarterfinals	L 63–65	19–10	Rupp Arena; Lexington, Kentucky
NCAA Tournament
Mar 14, 1986*	(8 W)	vs. (9 W) Arizona; First round	W 73–63	20–10	Long Beach Arena; Long Beach, California
Mar 16, 1986*	(8 W)	vs. (1 W) No. 4 St. John's; Second Round	W 81–65	21–10	Long Beach Arena; Long Beach, California
Mar 20, 1986*; CBS	(8 W)	vs. (4 W) No. 11 UNLV; West Regional semifinal – Sweet Sixteen	W 70–63	22–10	The Summit; Houston, Texas
Mar 22, 1986*; CBS	(8 W)	vs. (2 W) No. 7 Louisville; West Regional Final – Elite Eight	L 76–84	22–11	The Summit; Houston, Texas
*Non-conference game. ^{#}Rankings from AP Poll. (#) Tournament seedings in parentheses. W=West.

== Team players in the NBA draft ==
Year	Round	Pick	Player	NBA club
1986	1	4	Chuck Person	Indiana Pacers
