= Beau Archibald =

American basketball coach

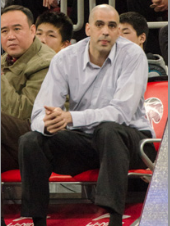
- CBA Playoffs

Current position
- Title: Head coach
- Team: Al Jaysh

Biographical details
- Born: December 19, 1976 (age 49); Los Angeles, California, U.S.

Playing career
- 1996–1997: Washington State
- 1998–2001: UConn
- Position: Forward

Coaching career (HC unless noted)
- 2001–2002: UConn (assistant)
- 2002–2003: Texas Tech (assistant)
- 2003–2004: Florida Atlantic (assistant)
- 2004–2005: Jacksonville (assistant)
- 2005–2006: FIU (assistant)
- 2007–2010: UConn (asst.)
- 2011: Foshan Dralions
- 2011–2012: Shanxi Zhongyu (Associate HC)

Beau Archibald (born December 19, 1976) is an American basketball coach, currently coaching internationally with El Jaish in Doha, Qatar. He previously coached the Zhejiang Guangsha Lions of the Chinese Basketball Association and the Shanxi Zhongyu Brave Dragons and Foshan Dralions. Before coaching Internationally Archibald coached under Hall of Fame coach Jim Calhoun at his alma mater, the University of Connecticut where he was a part of the Huskies' Final Four run in 2009.

Before coaching at Connecticut, Archibald worked at Florida International, Texas San Antonio, Jacksonville University, Florida Atlantic University and started his career as a volunteer assistant at Texas Tech with Bobby Knight. Throughout his coaching career Archibald has worked with some of basketball's best coaches, including Jim Calhoun and Bobby Knight. Archibald has also worked with Hugh Durham and Wang Fei, who was the former China men's national basketball team) coach.

Archibald has a daughter named Kennadi, who was born on June 10, 2003.

== Biography ==
=== Early life and education ===
Archibald was born in Los Angeles, California. He started high school in Tempe, Arizona at Corona del Sol High School, where he won a state championship in 1994. Archibald's family moved his senior year to Provo, Utah where he graduated from Timpview High School in Provo, Utah in 1995.

Archibald's father Lynn (1944–1997) was a Division I head coach at Idaho State (1977–1982) in Pocatello, Idaho, and Utah (1983–1989) in Salt Lake City.
