= 1986 SEC men's basketball tournament =

Annual college basketball tournament

- Classification: Division I
- Season: 1985–86
- Teams: 10
- Site: Rupp Arena; Lexington, Kentucky
- Champions: Kentucky (15th title)
- Winning coach: Eddie Sutton (1st title)
- MVP: John Williams (LSU)
- Attendance: 148,005
- Television: Lorimar Sports Network (First and Second Rounds, and semifinals); NBC (Championship Game)

1985–86 Southeastern Conference men's basketball standings
	Conf.				Overall
Team	W		L	PCT	W		L	PCT
No. 3 Kentucky †	17	–	1	.944	32	–	4	.889
Alabama	13	–	5	.722	24	–	9	.727
Auburn	13	–	5	.722	22	–	11	.667
Florida	10	–	8	.556	19	–	14	.576
LSU	9	–	9	.500	26	–	12	.684
Georgia	9	–	9	.500	17	–	13	.567
Vanderbilt	7	–	11	.389	13	–	15	.464
Tennessee	5	–	13	.278	12	–	16	.429
Ole Miss	4	–	14	.222	12	–	17	.414
Mississippi State	3	–	15	.167	6	–	22	.214
† 1986 SEC tournament winner Rankings from AP Poll

The 1986 SEC men's basketball tournament took place from March 5–8, 1986 at Rupp Arena in downtown Lexington, Kentucky, home to the University of Kentucky Wildcats men's basketball team. Kentucky won the SEC tournament championship title and the SEC's automatic bid to the 1986 NCAA Men's Division I Basketball tournament by defeating Alabama 83–72.

Coverage of the first round, the quarterfinals and semifinals was produced and regionally syndicated by the Lorimar Sports Network, the sports broadcasting arm of Lorimar-Telepictures. The semifinals of this tournament marks the LSN's final broadcast before going defunct; Jefferson-Pilot Teleproductions would win syndication rights to SEC Basketball before the following season. The championship game in this tournament was nationally televised by NBC, through its sports division, NBC Sports.

== Bracket ==
First Round; Wednesday, March 5 Lorimar Sports Network
8	Tennessee	56
9	Mississippi	73
7	Vanderbilt	54
10	Mississippi State	62

Second Round; Thursday, March 6 Lorimar Sports Network
1	#3 Kentucky	95
9	Mississippi	69
5	LSU	72
4	Florida	66
2	Auburn	63
10	Mississippi State	65
3	Alabama	77
6	Georgia	59

Semi-Finals; Friday, March 7 Lorimar Sports Network
1	#3 Kentucky	61
5	LSU	58
10	Mississippi State	65
3	Alabama	77

Finals; Saturday, March 8 NBC
1	#3 Kentucky	83
3	Alabama	72
