= 1985–86 UCLA Bruins men's basketball team =

American college basketball season

1985–86 UCLA Bruins men's basketball
- Conference: Pacific-10
- Record: 15–14 (9–9, 4th Pac-10)
- Head coach: Walt Hazzard
- Assistant coaches: Sidney Wicks; Jack Hirsch; Andre McCarter
- Home arena: Pauley Pavilion

1985–86 Pacific-10 Conference men's basketball standings
	Conf.				Overall
Team	W		L	PCT	W		L	PCT
Arizona	14	–	4	.778	23	–	9	.719
Washington	13	–	5	.722	19	–	12	.613
California	11	–	7	.611	19	–	10	.655
UCLA	9	–	9	.500	15	–	14	.517
Arizona State	8	–	10	.444	14	–	14	.500
Washington State	8	–	10	.444	15	–	16	.484
Stanford	8	–	10	.444	14	–	16	.467
Oregon State	8	–	10	.444	12	–	15	.444
Oregon	6	–	12	.333	11	–	17	.393
USC	5	–	13	.278	11	–	17	.393
As of March 25, 1986; Rankings from AP Poll

The 1985–86 UCLA Bruins men's basketball team represented the University of California, Los Angeles in the 1985–86 NCAA Division I men's basketball season. The team was led by freshman point guard Pooh Richardson and finished in 4th place in the conference with a 15–14 record. The Bruins played for the second time ever in the NIT but lost the game to the UC Irvine Anteaters in the first round.

== Starting lineup ==
Position	Player	Class
F	Reggie Miller	Jr.
F	Craig Jackson	So.
C	Jack Haley	Jr.
G	Montel Hatcher	Jr.
G	Pooh Richardson	Fr.

== Roster ==
1985–86 UCLA Bruins men's basketball team
Players
Coaches

Pos.	#	Name	Height	Weight	Year	Hometown
F	42	Kelvin Butler	6 ft 7 in (2.01 m)	—	So
G	44	Jeff Dunlap	6 ft 5 in (1.96 m)	—	Sr
G	4	Corey Gaines	6 ft 4 in (1.93 m)	—	Jr	Los Angeles, California
C	15	Jack Haley	6 ft 10 in (2.08 m)	—	Jr	Long Beach, California
G	12	Montel Hatcher (C)	6 ft 1 in (1.85 m)	—	Jr
F	52	Craig Jackson	6 ft 8 in (2.03 m)	—	So
F	22	Jerald Jones	6 ft 5 in (1.96 m)	—	So
F	31	Reggie Miller (C)	6 ft 7 in (2.01 m)	—	Jr	Riverside, California
G	20	Darryl Morris	6 ft 3 in (1.91 m)	—	So
G	21	Rodney Palmer	6 ft 3 in (1.91 m)	—	Fr
F	24	Pooh Richardson	6 ft 1 in (1.85 m)	—	Fr	Philadelphia, Pennsylvania
F	45	Charles Rochelin	6 ft 7 in (2.01 m)	—	Fr

Head coach

Walt Hazzard (UCLA)

Assistant coach(es)

- Sidney Wicks (UCLA)
- Jack Hirsch (UCLA)
- Andre McCarter (UCLA)

Legend

- (C) Team captain
- (S) Suspended
- (I) Ineligible
- (W) Walk-on
- Injured
- Current redshirt

Roster

== Schedule ==
Date time, TV	Rank^{#}	Opponent^{#}	Result	Record	Site city, state
Regular Season
November 24, 1985		at No. 2 North Carolina	L 70–107	0–1	Carmichael Arena (10,000); Chapel Hill, NC
November 29, 1985		St. Mary's	W 91–62	1–1	Pauley Pavilion (7,241); Los Angeles, CA
November 30, 1985		Temple	W 75–59	2–1	Pauley Pavilion (7,887); Los Angeles, CA
December 7, 1985		Long Beach State	W 84–64	3–1	Pauley Pavilion (7,735); Los Angeles, CA
December 14, 1985		No. 14 St. John's	L 65–69	3–2	Pauley Pavilion (10,322); Los Angeles, CA
December 20, 1985		Loyola Marymount	W 85–79	4–2	Pauley Pavilion (7,928); Los Angeles, CA
December 21, 1985		Miami	W 109–64	5–2	Pauley Pavilion (5,346); Los Angeles, CA
January 2, 1986		Oregon	W 71–65	6–2 (1–0)	Pauley Pavilion (8,351); Los Angeles, CA
January 4, 1986		Oregon State	L 49–54	6–3 (1–1)	Pauley Pavilion (6,843); Los Angeles, CA
January 9, 1986		at Washington	L 65–90	6–4 (1–2)	Hec Edmundson Pavilion (7,251); Seattle, WA
January 11, 1986		at Washington State	W 81–80 ^{2OT}	7–4 (2–2)	Beasley Coliseum (6,000); Pullman, WA
January 16, 1986		Arizona State	W 86–75	8–4 (3–2)	Pauley Pavilion (7,879); Los Angeles, CA
January 18, 1986		at No. 13 Notre Dame	L 64–74	8–5	Athletic & Convocation Center (11,345); Notre Dame, IN
January 23, 1986		at Stanford	L 70–76	8–6 (3–3)	Maples Pavilion (6,905); Stanford, CA
January 25, 1986		at California	L 67–75	8–7 (3–4)	Harmon Gym (6,660); Berkeley, CA
January 29, 1986		USC	W 66–56	9–7 (4–4)	Pauley Pavilion (10,593); Los Angeles, CA
February 1, 1986		at No. 18 Louisville	L 72–91	9–8	Freedom Hall (19,384); Louisville, KY
February 6, 1986		Washington	W 94–89 ^{OT}	10–8 (5–4)	Pauley Pavilion (7,718); Los Angeles, CA
February 9, 1986		Washington State	W 88–81	11–8 (6–4)	Pauley Pavilion (6,841); Los Angeles, CA
February 13, 1986		at Arizona	L 60–85	11–9 (6–5)	McKale Center (13,316); Tucson, AZ
February 15, 1986		at Arizona State	L 73–74 ^{OT}	11–10 (6–6)	ASU Activity Center (4,283); Tempe, AZ
February 20, 1986		California	W 76–63	12–10 (7–6)	Pauley Pavilion (10,642); Los Angeles, CA
February 22, 1986		at USC	L 64–79	12–11 (7–7)	Los Angeles Memorial Sports Arena (8,479); Los Angeles, CA
February 24, 1986		Stanford	W 95–74	13–11 (8–7)	Pauley Pavilion (6,441); Los Angeles, CA
March 1, 1986		DePaul	W 65–63	14–11	Pauley Pavilion (7,235); Los Angeles, CA
March 3, 1986		Arizona	L 76–88	14–12 (8–8)	Pauley Pavilion (8,672); Los Angeles, CA
March 6, 1986		at Oregon State	W 74–63	15–12 (9–8)	Gill Coliseum (7,767); Corvallis, OR
March 8, 1986		at Oregon	L 65–80	15–13 (9–9)	McArthur Court (9,074); Eugene, OR
NIT
March 13, 1986		UC Irvine; First Round	L 74–80	15–14	Pauley Pavilion (7,089); Los Angeles, CA
*Non-conference game. ^{#}Rankings from AP Poll. (#) Tournament seedings in parentheses. All times are in Pacific Time.

== Schedule and results ==
- November 24, 1985 – UCLA lost to North Carolina 107–70 in Chapel Hill.
- December 21, 1985 – UCLA defeated Miami (Florida) 109–64 in Pauley Pavilion
- March 13, 1986 – In the first-round game of the NIT, the Bruins were defeated 80–74 by UC Irvine. Reggie Miller scored 16 points.
- The Bruins were 4th in the Pacific-10.

== Notes ==
- Jack Haley died on March 16, 2015, at 51 years old.
