= 1986 Pacific Coast Athletic Association men's basketball tournament =

- Classification: Division I
- Season: 1985–86
- Teams: 8
- Site: The Forum; Inglewood, CA
- Champions: UNLV (3rd title)
- Winning coach: Jerry Tarkanian (3rd title)
- MVP: Anthony Jones (UNLV)
- Pacific Coast Athletic Association men's basketball tournaments

1985–86 Pacific Coast Athletic Association men's basketball standings
	Conf.				Overall
Team	W		L	PCT	W		L	PCT
No. 11 UNLV †	16	–	2	.889	33	–	5	.868
UC Irvine	12	–	6	.667	17	–	13	.567
New Mexico State	10	–	8	.556	18	–	12	.600
San Jose State	9	–	9	.500	16	–	12	.571
Pacific	9	–	9	.500	17	–	14	.548
Cal State Fullerton	8	–	10	.444	16	–	16	.500
Fresno State	8	–	10	.444	15	–	15	.500
Utah State	8	–	10	.444	12	–	16	.429
UC Santa Barbara	7	–	11	.389	12	–	15	.444
Long Beach State	3	–	15	.167	7	–	22	.241
† 1986 PCAA tournament winner

The 1986 Pacific Coast Athletic Association men's basketball tournament (now known as the Big West Conference men's basketball tournament) was held March 6–8 at The Forum in Inglewood, California.

Top-seeded UNLV defended their title and defeated New Mexico State in the final, 75–55, and captured their third PCAA/Big West championship (and third in four seasons).

The Runnin' Rebels, in turn, received a bid to the 1986 NCAA tournament, their seventh in program history, and advanced to the Sweet Sixteen.

== Format ==
The tournament field remained the same as 1985, with eight total teams. Again, only the top eight teams, out of ten, from the regular season standings qualified for the tournament.

All eight participating teams were placed into the first round, with teams seeded and paired based on regular-season records. After the first round, teams were re-seeded so the highest-remaining team was paired with the lowest-remaining time in one semifinal with the other two teams slotted into the other semifinal.

== Bracket ==
First round Thursday, March 6
1	No. 13 UNLV	68
8	Fresno State	49
5	Pacific	55
4	San José State	53
(Pairings are reseeded after the first round)
3	New Mexico State	74
6	Utah State	71
7	Cal State Fullerton	66
2	UC Irvine	58

Semifinals; Friday, March 7
1	#13 UNLV	75
7	Cal State Fullerton	65
3	New Mexico State	75
5	Pacific	61

Championship; Saturday, March 8
1	#13 UNLV	75
3	New Mexico State	55
