= 1986 WAC men's basketball tournament =

- Classification: Division I
- Season: 1985–86
- Teams: 9
- Site: Arena-Auditorium; Laramie, WY
- Champions: UTEP (2nd title)
- Winning coach: Don Haskins (2nd title)
- MVP: Eric Leckner (Wyoming)

1985–86 WAC men's basketball standings
	Conf.				Overall
Team	W		L	PCT	W		L	PCT
Wyoming	12	–	4	.750	24	–	12	.667
No. 20 UTEP †	12	–	4	.750	27	–	6	.818
Utah	12	–	4	.750	20	–	10	.667
Brigham Young	11	–	5	.688	18	–	14	.563
New Mexico	8	–	8	.500	17	–	14	.548
San Diego State	7	–	9	.438	10	–	19	.345
Colorado State	6	–	10	.375	11	–	18	.379
Air Force	3	–	13	.188	10	–	19	.345
Hawaii	1	–	15	.063	4	–	24	.143
† 1986 WAC tournament winner Rankings from AP Poll

The 1986 Western Athletic Conference men's basketball tournament was held March 4–8 at the Arena-Auditorium at the University of Wyoming in Laramie, Wyoming.

UTEP defeated top-seeded Wyoming in the championship game, 65–64, to clinch their second WAC men's tournament championship.

The Miners, in turn, received an automatic bid to the 1986 NCAA tournament. Third-seeded Utah, who lost in the quarterfinal round, also earned an at-large bid.

== Format ==
Even though the tournament field remained fixed at nine teams, there were some changes to the tournament structure. Teams were again seeded based on regular season conference records, although the previous double-bye structure for the top two seeds was eliminated. Instead, all teams were entered into the quarterfinal round with the exception of the two lowest-seeded teams, who played in the preliminary first round to determine who would then play against the tournament's top seed.

== Bracket ==
First round Tuesday, March 4
9	Hawaii	58
8	Air Force	64

Quarterfinals; Thursday, March 6
1	Wyoming	67
8	Air Force	65
5	New Mexico	79
4	BYU	68
3	Utah	71
6	San Diego State	73
7	Colorado State	50
2	UTEP	58

Semifinals; Friday, March 7
1	Wyoming	56
5	New Mexico	54
6	San Diego State	76
2	UTEP	78

Championship; Saturday, March 8
1	Wyoming	64
2	UTEP	65
