= 1985–86 Washington Huskies men's basketball team =

American college basketball season

1985–86 Washington Huskies men's basketball

NCAA tournament, First round
- Conference: Pacific-10 Conference
- Record: 19–12 (13–5 Pac-10)
- Head coach: Andy Russo (1st season)
- Home arena: Hec Edmundson Pavilion

1985–86 Pacific-10 Conference men's basketball standings
| | Conf. | | | | Overall |
| Team | W | | L | PCT | W | | L | PCT |
|---|---|---|---|---|---|---|---|---|
| Arizona | 14 | – | 4 | .778 | 23 | – | 9 | .719 |
| Washington | 13 | – | 5 | .722 | 19 | – | 12 | .613 |
| California | 11 | – | 7 | .611 | 19 | – | 10 | .655 |
| UCLA | 9 | – | 9 | .500 | 15 | – | 14 | .517 |
| Arizona State | 8 | – | 10 | .444 | 14 | – | 14 | .500 |
| Washington State | 8 | – | 10 | .444 | 15 | – | 16 | .484 |
| Stanford | 8 | – | 10 | .444 | 14 | – | 16 | .467 |
| Oregon State | 8 | – | 10 | .444 | 12 | – | 15 | .444 |
| Oregon | 6 | – | 12 | .333 | 11 | – | 17 | .393 |
| USC | 5 | – | 13 | .278 | 11 | – | 17 | .393 |
As of March 25, 1986; Rankings from AP Poll

The 1985–86 Washington Huskies men's basketball team represented the University of Washington for the 1985–86 NCAA Division I men's basketball season. Led by first-year head coach Andy Russo, the Huskies were members of the Pacific-10 Conference and played their home games on campus at Hec Edmundson Pavilion in Seattle, Washington.

The Huskies were 19–11 overall in the regular season and 13–5 in conference play, runner-up in the standings, a game behind champion Arizona. There was no conference tournament this season; it debuted the following year.

Washington went to the 64-team NCAA tournament for the third consecutive year. Seeded twelfth in the Midwest regional, they lost to Michigan State in the first round in Dayton, Ohio.

Following Marv Harshman's retirement in March 1985, Russo was hired a few weeks later; he was formerly the head coach at Louisiana Tech.

== Postseason results ==
| Date time, TV | Rank^{#} | Opponent^{#} | Result | Record | Site (attendance) city, state |
NCAA Tournament
| Thu, March 13*; 6:37 pm | (12MW) | vs. (5MW) No. 18 Michigan State; First round | L 70–72 | 19–12 | UD Arena (13,260); Dayton, Ohio |
*Non-conference game. ^{#}Rankings from AP poll. (#) Tournament seedings in parentheses. All times are in Pacific time.
