= Tod Murphy =

American basketball player and coach

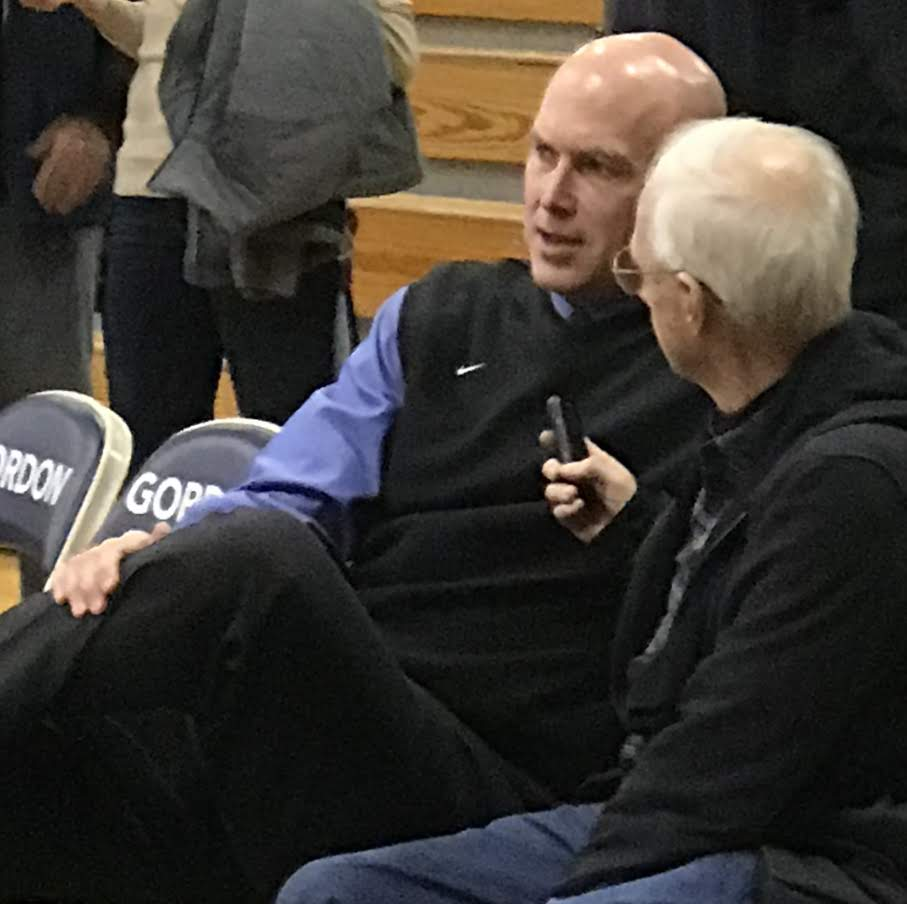
- Murphy being interviewed after a game in 2019

Personal information
- Born: December 24, 1963 (age 62) Long Beach, California, U.S.
- Listed height: 6 ft 9 in (2.06 m)
- Listed weight: 220 lb (100 kg)

Career information
- High school: Lakewood (Lakewood, California)
- College: UC Irvine (1982–1986)
- NBA draft: 1986: 3rd round, 53rd overall pick
- Drafted by: Seattle SuperSonics
- Playing career: 1987–1998
- Position: Power forward / center
- Number: 46, 4, 9, 41
- Coaching career: 2001–present

Career history

Playing
- 1987: Los Angeles Clippers
- 1987–1988: Albany Patroons
- 1988–1989: BBV Collado Villalba
- 1989–1992: Minnesota Timberwolves
- 1993: Rochester Renegade
- 1993–1994: Detroit Pistons
- 1994: Golden State Warriors
- 1994: Kleenex Pistoia
- 1994–1995: Valvi Girona
- 1995: Gymnastikos Larissa
- 1995–1996: Nuova Tirrena Roma
- 1996–1998: Daiwa Securities Hot Blizzards

Coaching
- 2001–2003: UC Riverside (assistant)
- 2003–2009: UC Irvine (assistant)
- 2009–present: Gordon

Career highlights
- CBA champion (1988); CBA Playoff/Finals MVP (1988); 2× First-team All-PCAA (1985, 1986); PCAA All-Freshman Team (1983)
- Stats at NBA.com
- Stats at Basketball Reference

Tod James Murphy (born December 24, 1963) is an American college basketball coach and retired professional basketball player. Since 2009, Murphy has been the head coach at Gordon College, leading the Fighting Scots to two Commonwealth Coast Conference championships, the first coming in his first season with the team (2009–10) and the second in 2013–14.

Murphy played five seasons of professional basketball in the National Basketball Association (NBA). He was selected by the Seattle SuperSonics in the third round (53rd overall) of the 1986 NBA draft. A 6'9" center-forward from the University of California, Irvine, Murphy played for the Los Angeles Clippers, Minnesota Timberwolves, Detroit Pistons and Golden State Warriors over the course of his NBA career. He played in a total of 191 NBA games and scored 1,049 career points. On March 17, 1990, as a member of the Timberwolves, he scored a career-high 24 points against the Los Angeles Lakers. Murphy played for the Albany Patroons of the Continental Basketball Association (CBA) during the 1987–88 season and was selected as the CBA Playoff/Finals Most Valuable Player.

Prior to his tenure at Gordon, Murphy served as an assistant coach for University of California, Riverside, as well as his alma mater at UC Irvine.

== Professional career ==
=== NBA draft and debut (1986–87) ===
After graduating from UC Irvine, Murphy was selected 53rd overall in the third round of the 1986 NBA draft by the Seattle SuperSonics. After being cut during training camp, he began playing overseas in the Italian League; however, he began sustaining knee cartilage damage in an exhibition game only eight days after his arrival in Europe. He returned home to the United States for surgery, attending several UC Irvine games as a volunteer assistant coach. The following year, Murphy was signed by the Los Angeles Clippers at the beginning of the 1987–88 season as a replacement for Michael Cage, who was a holdout. Murphy played 19 minutes in the opening game of the season but was cut once Cage reagreed to terms with the team.

=== CBA championship MVP (1987–89) ===
After missing two months with mononucleosis, Murphy then signed with the Albany Patroons of the Continental Basketball Association (CBA) for the remainder of the 1987–88 season. The Patroons would go on to win the 1988 CBA championship, while Murphy ended the season as the most valuable player of the CBA championship series. Towards the end of the season, Murphy earned an offer from the Golden State Warriors to join the team for the final 16 days of the NBA season, but declined the offer to focus on winning the CBA title. Murphy later recalled of the situation, "To play in the NBA was my lifetime dream and I couldn't have passed it up. But we were right in the middle of the playoffs and I wanted to win the championship so badly... So I stayed." He received tryout camp invitations from both the Warriors and Boston Celtics in the 1988 offseason, but was not offered a regular-season contract by either team. Murphy spent the 1988–89 season playing in Spain for BBV Collado Villalba. He played in all 36 games for the team, averaging 18.6 points and 9.5 rebounds in 37.1 minutes per game.

=== Breakout years with Minnesota Timberwolves (1989–92) ===
During the summer of 1989, the Minnesota Timberwolves, who were one of two new expansion teams for the 1989–90 NBA season invited Murphy to a free agent camp and a rookie camp in June and July respectively. On August 16, 1989, Murphy signed a one-year contract with the team. Murphy said that he considered his opportunity with the Timberwolves "one more chance" to launch his NBA career, adding, "If it doesn't work out this time, I'll make a career overseas."

The Timberwolves began their season with only five victories in their first 26 games, leading Timberwolves head coach Bill Musselman to make some rotation changes, which included inserting Murphy into the starting lineup. Murphy played the rest of the season as a regular starter, setting a then-team record on January 2 with 20 rebounds in a game against the Clippers. On March 17, Murphy set a career-high by scoring 24 points against the Los Angeles Lakers, a game the Timberwolves narrowly lost (101–99). Despite some minor injuries (leading the Los Angeles Times' Mike Penner to call him "Minnesota's man of 10,000 aches"), Murphy played in all 82 games of the Timberwolves' inaugural season.

=== Move to Houston, injury (1992–93) ===
After being waived by Minnesota, Murphy joined the Houston Rockets for an offseason workout and signed with the team before the 1992–93 season began. However, early in his tenure with the team, he suffered a recurring hamstring injury, forcing him to miss most of the season. Murphy eventually recovered for the final two months of the season but never played a game for the Rockets as the team did not want to lose their chemistry. He earned $500,000 from his contract with Houston.

=== Return to CBA, brief stints with Detroit, Golden State (1993–94) ===
Murphy participated in offseason tryouts with the Clippers and Charlotte Hornets but failed to receive a spot on either roster. He eventually returned to the CBA with the Rochester Renegade, who acquired him in November. The move reunited him with Musselman. Murphy received a call-up from the Detroit Pistons on December 16. He was waived by the team on January 6. Murphy then signed a ten-day contract with the Warriors on January 17 as a replacement for Byron Houston after Houston suffered a sprained ankle.

=== Final years as a player (1994–98) ===
Murphy spent his final seasons playing for teams in Italy, Greece, Spain, and Japan. He returned to Italy to join Kleenex Pistoia for the remainder of 1994. He then joined Valvi Girona in Spain for the 1994–95 season. After a brief stint in Greece, Murphy spent the following season (1995–96) with Italy's Virtus Roma. His final two seasons came with the Daiwa Securities Hot Blizzards in Japan, where he played until his retirement in 1998.

== NBA career statistics ==
Legend
GP	Games played	GS	Games started	MPG	Minutes per game
FG%	Field goal percentage	3P%	3-point field goal percentage	FT%	Free throw percentage
RPG	Rebounds per game	APG	Assists per game	SPG	Steals per game
BPG	Blocks per game	PPG	Points per game	**Bold**	Career high

=== Regular season ===
Year	Team	GP	GS	MPG	FG%	3P%	FT%	RPG	APG	SPG	BPG	PPG
1987–88	L.A. Clippers	1	0	19.0	**1.000**	-	**.750**	2.0	**2.0**	**1.0**	.0	5.0
1989–90	Minnesota	**82**	**59**	**30.4**	.471	.372	.709	**6.9**	1.3	.9	**.7**	**8.3**
1990–91	Minnesota	52	19	20.4	.396	.059	.667	4.9	1.2	.5	.4	4.8
1991–92	Minnesota	47	3	9.1	.488	**.500**	.599	2.3	.2	.2	.2	2.1
1993–94	Detroit	7	0	8.1	.500	-	.500	1.3	.4	.3	.0	2.1
1993–94	Golden State	2	0	5.0	-	-	-	.5	.5	.0	.0	0.0
Career		191	81	21.3	.454	.290	.679	4.9	1.0	.6	.5	5.5
