= List of Manhattan University alumni =

This is a list of notable alumni of Manhattan University in Riverdale, New York.

== Notable alumni ==
=== Academia ===
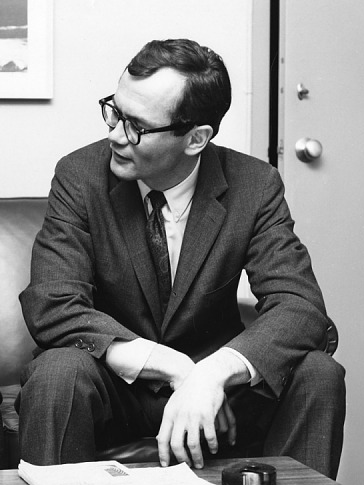
Robert Jastrow

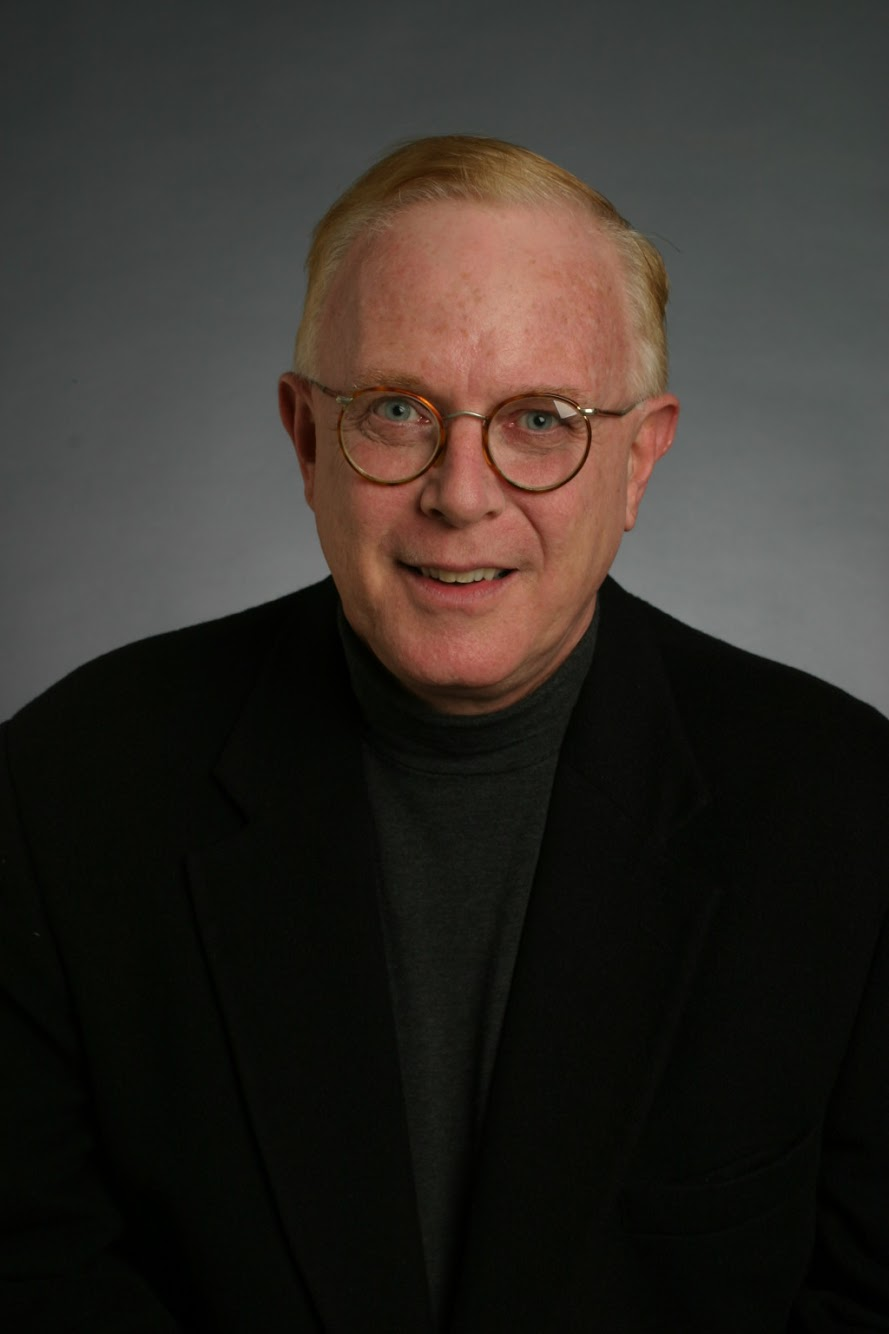
Kevin V. Mulcahy

- Joseph A. Alutto – executive vice president and provost of Ohio State University
- Edward Countryman – Class of 1966 – distinguished professor of history at Southern Methodist University
- Christopher Coyne – Class of 1999 – F.A. Harper Professor of Economics at George Mason University
- Robert Jastrow – first chairman of NASA's Lunar Exploration Committee, professor at Yale and Dartmouth, recipient of Doctor of Science (honorary)
- George E. McCarthy – Class of 1968 – National Endowment for the Humanities Distinguished Teaching Professor of Sociology at Kenyon College
- Kevin V. Mulcahy – Sheldon Beychok Distinguished Professor Louisiana State University
- Mary Eileen O'Brien – president of Dominican University New York
- L. Jay Oliva – 14th President of New York University
- Henry Petroski – award-winning professor of civil engineering at Duke University
- Ángel Ramos – founder of the National Hispanic Council of the Deaf and Hard of Hearing, Superintendent of the Idaho School for the Deaf and the Blind
- James Vreeland – associate professor of International Relations at Georgetown University
- Erick Weinberg – professor of theoretical physics at Columbia University

=== Arts and literature ===
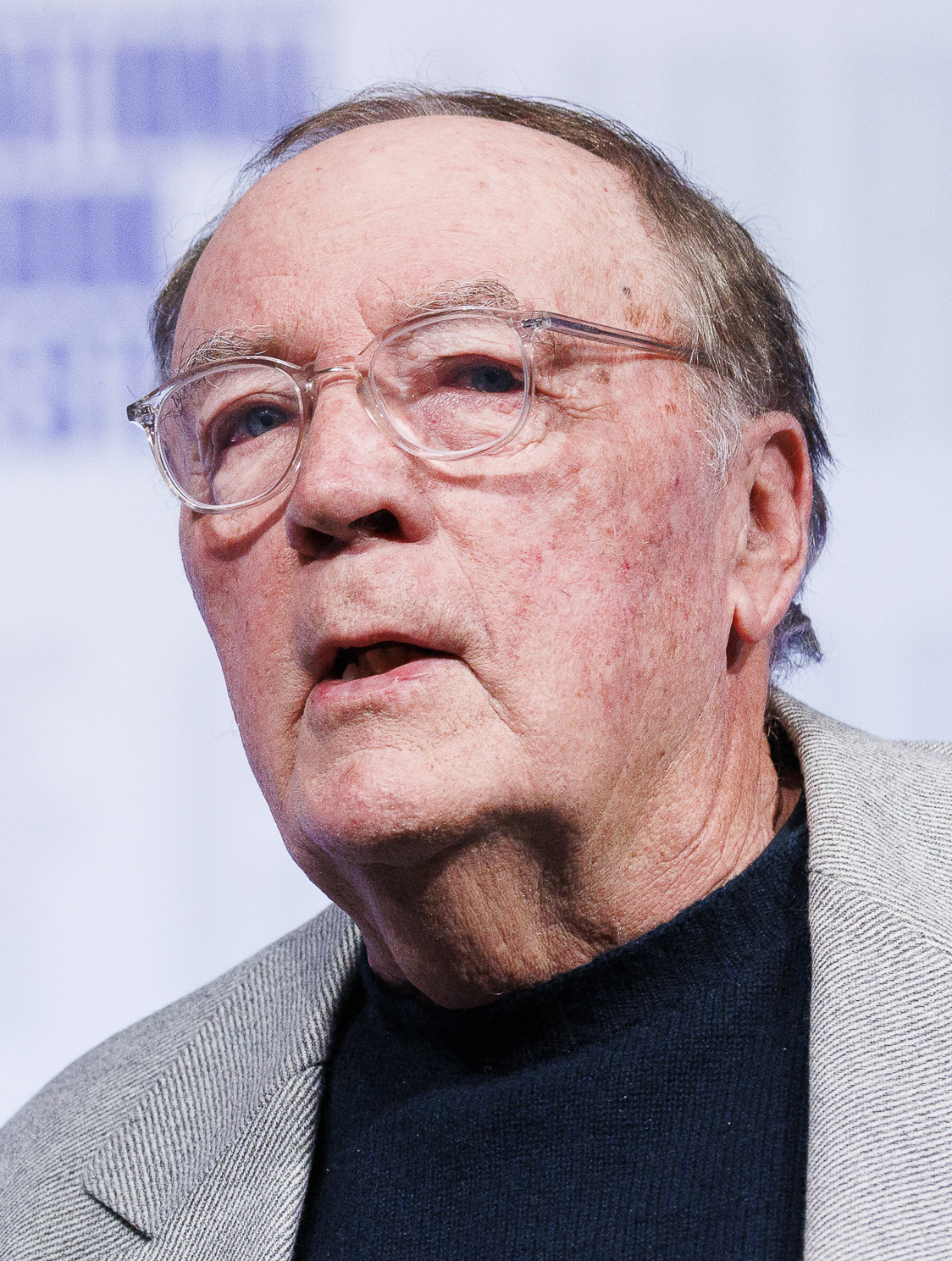
James Patterson

- Sam Barone – historical novelist with novels centered on early Antiquity
- William Edmund Barrett – author of The Left Hand of God and Lilies of the Field
- Nakia D. Johnson – African-American novelist
- Paul Mariani – poet, biographer, and essayist – Internationally Known Poet to Give Reading at Georgian Court University
- James Patterson – New York Times best-selling and Edgar Award-winning novelist, author of Along Came a Spider and Kiss the Girls
- Al Sarrantonio – science fiction, mystery and horror author and winner of the Bram Stoker Award.
- Robert Shea – co-author (with Robert Anton Wilson) of The Illuminatus! Trilogy
- George A. Sheehan – cardiologist and New York Times bestselling author of Running & Being: The Total Experience

=== Business ===
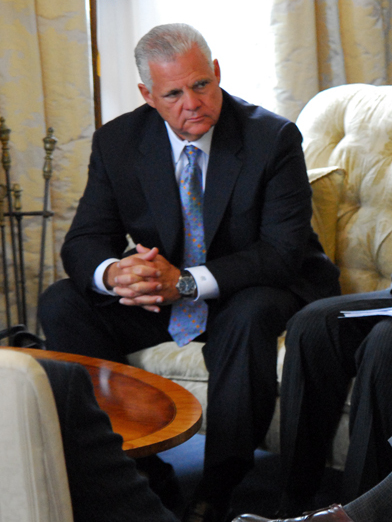
Joseph M. Tucci

- Sam Belnavis – former owner of NASCAR
- John M. Fahey – president and chief executive officer of the National Geographic Society
- Frank M. Folsom – former president of RCA Victor and permanent representative of the Holy See
- Thomas Gambino – New York mobster and a longtime caporegime of the Gambino crime family
- Lynn Martin – 68th president of the New York Stock Exchange
- Eugene R. McGrath – former chairman and CEO of Con Edison
- Joe Mohen – internet entrepreneur
- Roderick McMahon – professional wrestling and boxing promoter; patriarch of the McMahon wrestling family
- Eileen Murray – former CEO of Investment Risk Management LLC
- Joseph M. Tucci – chairman, president and CEO of the EMC Corporation
- Stephen Squeri - chairman and CEO of the American Express

=== Entertainment ===
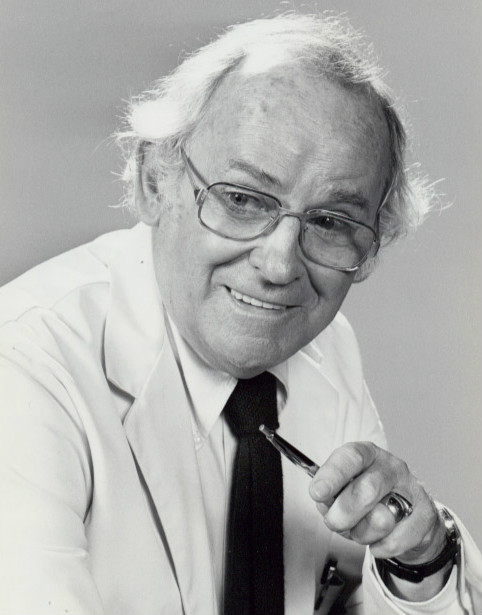
Barnard Hughes

- Frank Campanella – TV and motion picture actor, Captain Video
- Joseph Campanella – TV, stage, and motion picture actor, Mannix
- Alexandra Chando – actress, Maddie on As the World Turns
- Dennis Day – TV and radio personality, The Jack Benny Show
- Katie Henry – blues rock singer, guitarist, pianist and songwriter
- Barnard Hughes – Emmy and Tony Award winning actor, Hugh Leonard's Da
- Mike Mazurki – former professional wrestler and character actor
- Hugo Montenegro – TV and movie soundtrack composer, I Dream of Jeannie and The Outcasts
- Glenn Hughes – founding member of The Village People, as the biker.
- Liam O'Brien – screenwriter and television producer best known for writing the movie 'Here Comes the Groom

=== Journalism ===
- James Brady – New York City celebrity tabloid columnist who created the Page Six gossip column in the New York Post
- Don Dunphy – boxing announcer, Radio Hall of Fame inductee
- Jerry Girard – former sportscaster, WPIX
- Judith West – entrepreneur business woman, political activist, radio personality and hosts her own cable network TV Show, Getting Your Money's Worth

=== Government and public policy ===
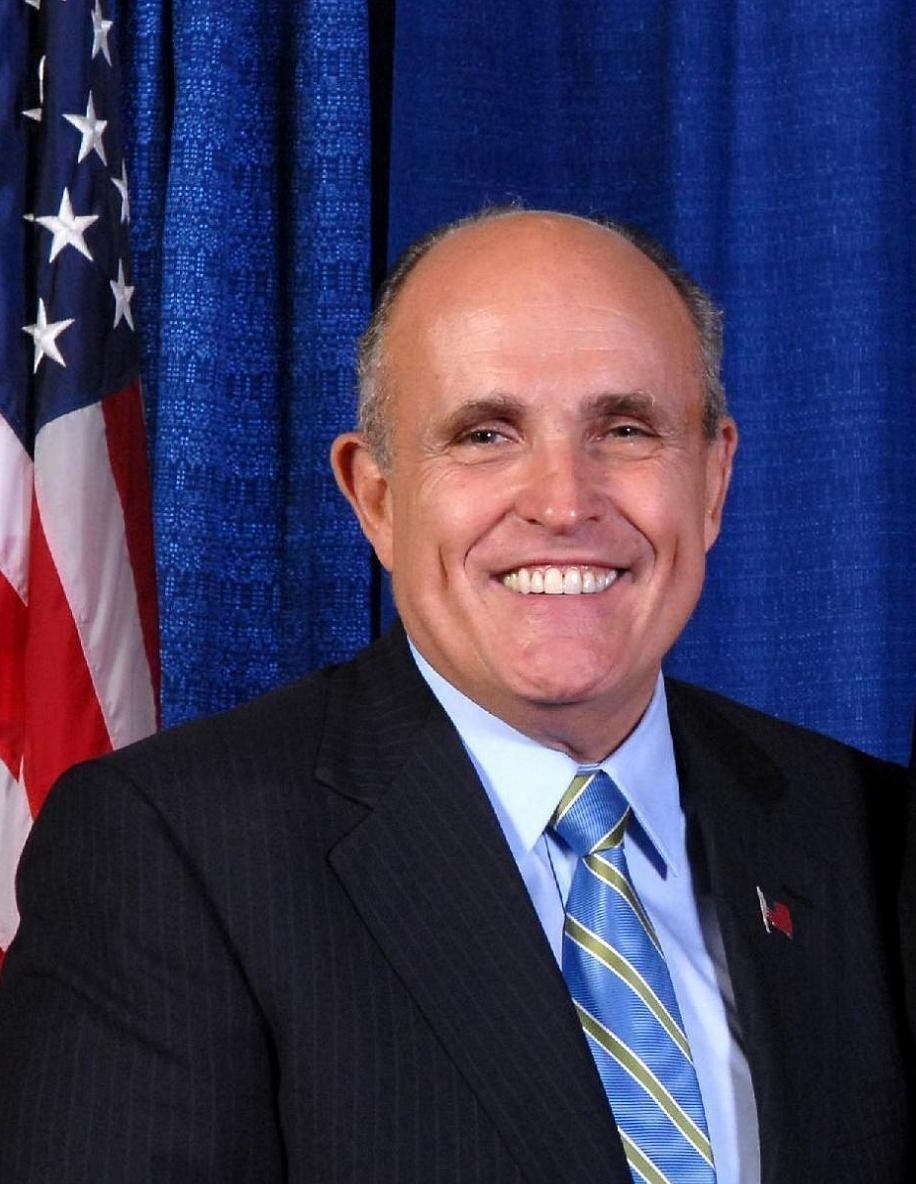
Rudy Giuliani

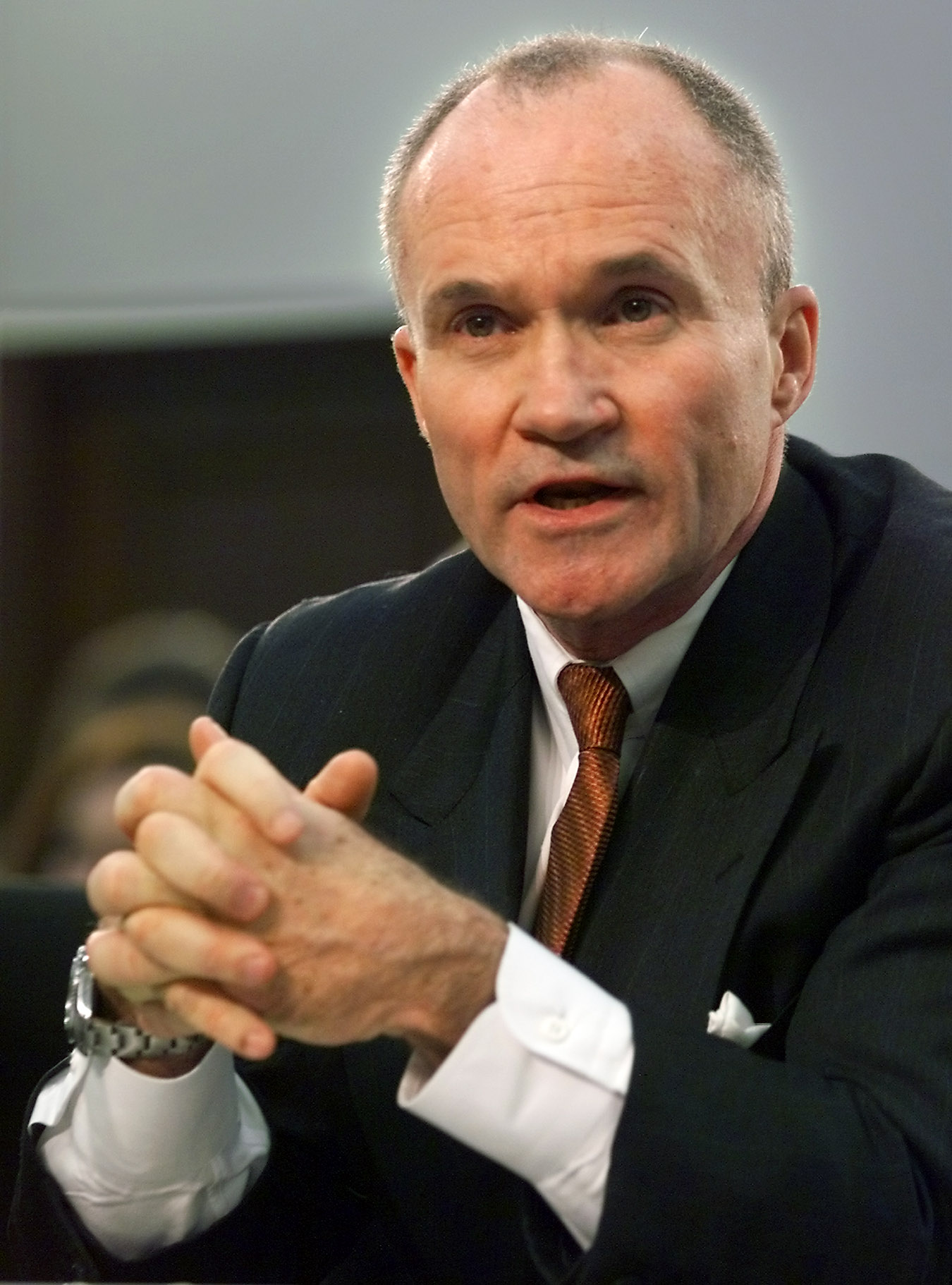
Raymond W. Kelly

- Phil Amicone – 41st Mayor of Yonkers, New York
- Vincent H. Auleta – former member of the New York State Assembly
- John J. Boylan – former member of U.S. House of Representatives for New York's 15th congressional district
- Thomas J. Curry – 30th Comptroller of the Currency of the United States
- John J. Delaney – former member of U.S. House of Representatives for New York's 7th congressional district
- Thomas R. Donahue – former Secretary-Treasurer, AFL–CIO
- John J. Fitzgerald – former member of U.S. House of Representatives for New York's 7th congressional district
- Paul C. Genereux – US Army brigadier general
- Hugh J. Grant – 91st Mayor of New York City
- Rudy Giuliani – 2008 U.S. Presidential Candidate and former Mayor of New York City
- Ronald Green – head of the United Worker's Party; former member of the House of Assembly of Dominica
- Raymond W. Kelly '63 – Commissioner of the New York City Police Department
- Mike Lawler '09 – member of Congress representing New York's 17th congressional district
- Arthur J. Lichte – United States Air Force General and Commander of the Air Mobility Command
- William Lucas – Wayne County Executive and 1986 Michigan gubernatorial candidate
- Joseph Maguire – Vice Admiral of the United States Navy
- Serphin R. Maltese – former member of the New York State Senate
- John McCarthy '61 – former U.S. Ambassador to Tunisia
- Dominic J. Monetta – former deputy director of Defense Research and Engineering (Research and Advanced Technology) at the U.S. Department of Defense from 1991 to 1993, and former director, Office of New Production Reactors, at the United States Department of Energy from 1989 to 1991
- Thomas McNamara '62 – former Assistant Secretary of State for Political-Military Affairs and U.S. Ambassador to Colombia
- Chang Myon – 2nd and 7th Prime Minister of South Korea
- Bill Owens (New York politician) – U.S. Representative for New York's 23rd congressional district
- Peter A. Quinn – former U.S. Representative from New York
- James Rispoli – Assistant Secretary of Energy for Environmental Management
- Angelo D. Roncallo – former member of U.S. House of Representatives for New York's 3rd congressional district
- Russell Schriefer – political strategist and media consultant
- José M. Serrano – New York State Senator representing the South Bronx, East Harlem, Yorkville and Roosevelt Island
- Thomas Francis Smith – former member of U.S. House of Representatives for New York
- Andrew Lawrence Somers – former member of U.S. House of Representatives for New York's 6th congressional district and New York's 10th congressional district
- James J. Walsh – former member of U.S. House of Representatives for New York
- Thomas Michael Whalen III – three-term Mayor of Albany, New York

=== Law ===
- Joseph Raymond Jackson – former Judge of the United States Court of Customs and Patent Appeals
- John F. Keenan – Judge for the United States District Court for the Southern District of New York
- John S. Martin – former U.S. Attorney and Judge for United States District for the Southern District of New York
- Richard C. Wilbur – judge of the United States Tax Court

=== Math and science ===
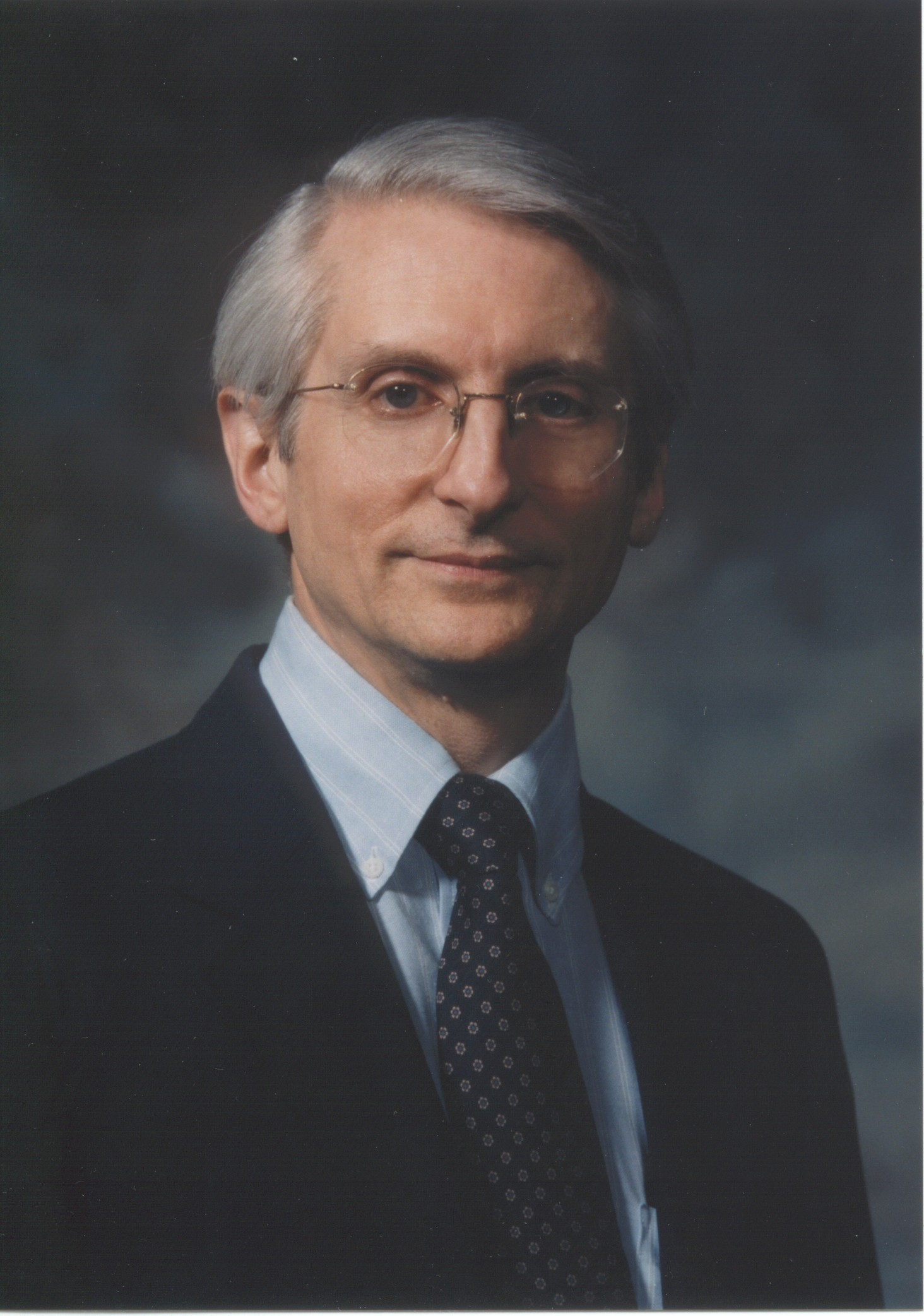
Peter J. Denning

- James Amrhein – Executive director of the Masonry Institute of America
- Kevin Campbell – Principal Investigator for the Howard Hughes Medical Institute; internationally recognized for his contributions to muscular dystrophy research
- James W. Cooley – mathematician, co-author of the FFT (fast Fourier transform) algorithm used in digital processing
- Peter J. Denning – award-winning computer scientist best known for inventing the working-set model for program behavior, which defeated thrashing in operating systems and became the reference standard for all memory management policies
- Michael J. Flynn – professor emeritus of computer science at Stanford University; recipient of Harry H. Goode Memorial Award
- Arthur J. Fox Jr. – civil engineer and former editor-in-chief of Engineering News-Record
- Edward E. Hammer – IEEE Edison Medal for fluorescent lighting research
- Valery Havard – botanist for whom many Texas plants are named, including the Chisos bluebonnet (Lupinus havardii), Havard oak (Quercus havardii), and Havard's evening primrose (Oenothera havardii)
- Robert Tomasulo – computer scientist, inventor of the Tomasulo algorithm, 1997-recipient of Eckert–Mauchly Award
- Michael Walsh – vehicle emissions engineer and 2005 MacArthur Fellow
- Erick Weinberg – physicist at Columbia University

=== Religion ===
- Patrick Ahern – former Auxiliary Bishop of New York
- Austin Dowling – former Archbishop of Saint Paul and Minneapolis
- Patrick Joseph Hayes – former Cardinal Archbishop of New York
- Bryan Joseph McEntegart – former Bishop of Ogdensburg and Brooklyn
- John Joseph Mitty – former Archbishop of San Francisco
- George Mundelein – former Cardinal Archbishop of Chicago
- John Joseph Thomas Ryan – Archbishop for the Military Services and Anchorage
- Michael Angelo Saltarelli – former Bishop of Wilmington

=== Sports ===
==== Baseball ====
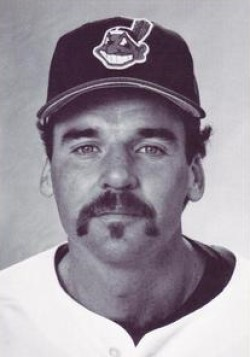
Tom Waddell

- Luis Castro – second Latin-American to play Major League Baseball (MLB)
- George Chalmers – former MLB player
- Pat Duff – former MLB catcher/first baseman
- Bill Finley – former MLB catcher/outfielder
- Joe Gallagher – former MLB player
- Buddy Hassett – former MLB player
- Joe Jacques – pitcher for the Boston Red Sox
- Andy Karl – former MLB player
- Chris Mahoney – former MLB pitcher
- Charlie Meara – former MLB outfielder
- Cotton Minahan – former MLB pitcher
- Mike Parisi – pitcher for the Memphis Redbirds, St. Louis Cardinals
- Xavier Rescigno – former MLB player
- Matt Rizzotti – infielder for Lehigh Valley IronPigs, Philadelphia Phillies
- Doc Scanlan – former MLB player
- Chuck Schilling – former MLB player
- Brewery Jack Taylor – former MLB player
- Henry Thielman – former MLB player
- Jake Thielman – former MLB player
- Nick Tremark – former MLB player
- Tom Waddell – former MLB pitcher
- Eddie Zimmerman – former MLB player

==== Basketball ====
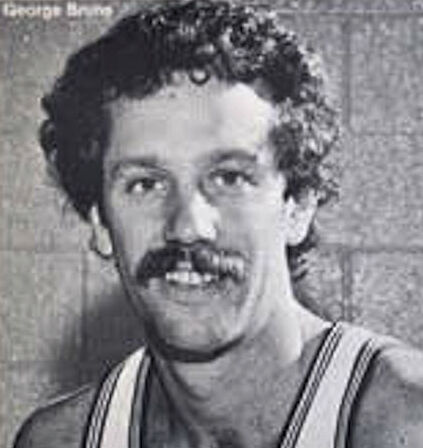
George Bruns

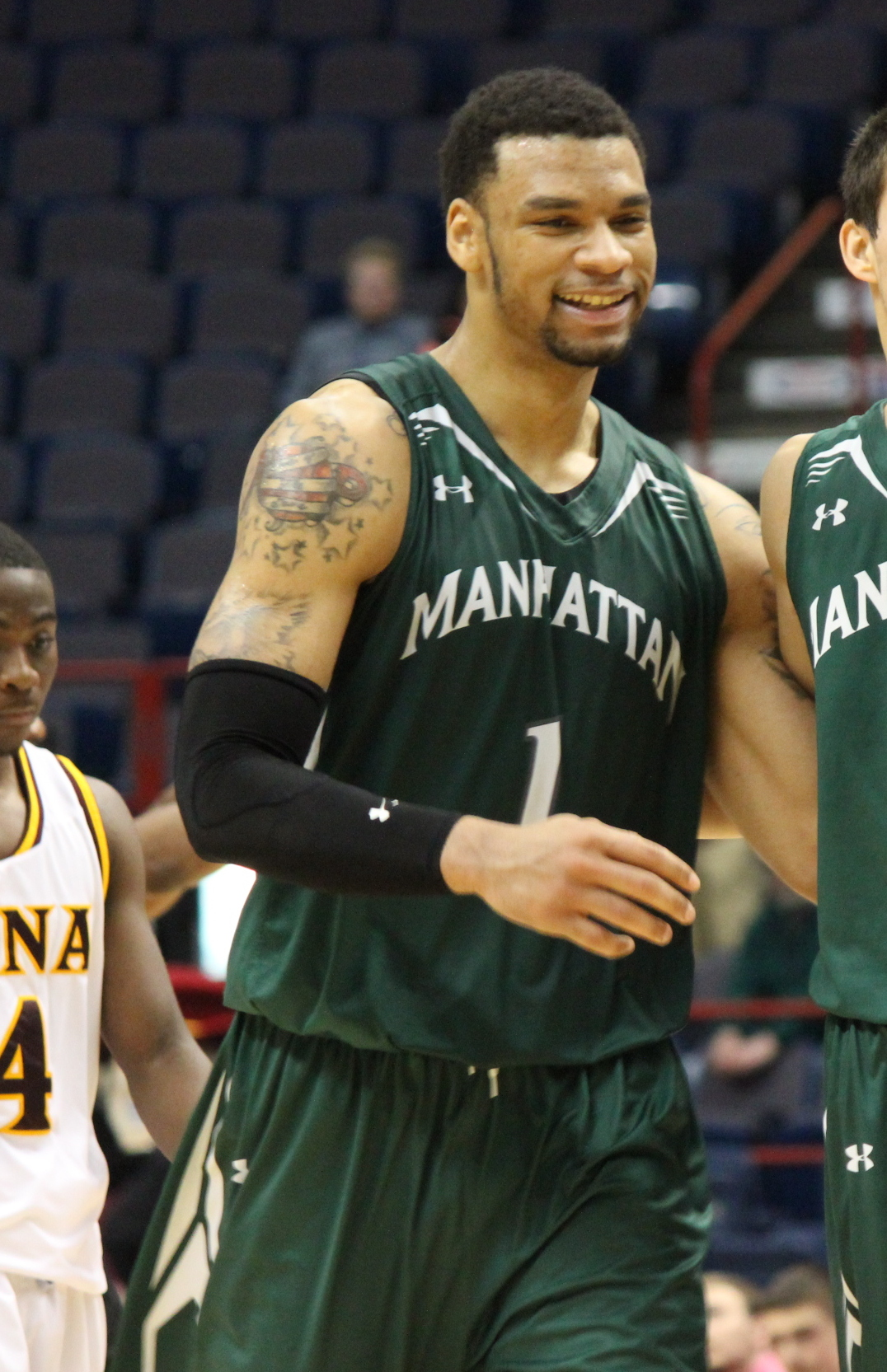
Ashton Pankey

- David Bernsley – American-Israeli basketball player
- Brenton Birmingham (born 1972) – American-Icelandic former basketball player
- George Bruns (born 1946) – former National Basketball Association (NBA) player
- George Bucci – former American Basketball Association (ABA) player
- Bill Campion – former NBA player, drafted in 1975 by the Milwaukee Bucks
- Neil Cohalan – first professional basketball coach of the New York Knicks
- Luis Flores – Dominican former NBA point guard, 2009 top scorer in the Israel Basketball Premier League
- Junius Kellogg – former Harlem Globetrotter; team member who reported college basketball point-shaving scheme
- Kevin Laue – received a scholarship to play Division I basketball for Manhattan University
- Brian Mahoney – former ABA player and college coach
- Ricky Marsh – former NBA player
- Ashton Pankey – 2015 MAAC tournament MVP; last played for Hapoel Galil Elyon
- Pauly Paulicap – 2018 MAAC Defensive Player of the Year
- Chris Smith – American-Israeli basketball player for Hapoel Galil Elyon of the Israeli Israeli Basketball Premier League

==== Football ====
- John Luddy Burke – Captain of the Manhattan Jaspers
- Vincent dePaul Draddy – Manhattan University quarterback who developed the Izod and Lacoste brands. College Football Hall of Famer and Chairman of the National Football Foundation. The Vincent dePaul Draddy Trophy is a trophy awarded by the National Football Foundation that is given to the American college football player with the best combination of academics, community service, and on-field performance. It is considered by many to be the "Academic Heisman."
- Vic Fusia – former head football coach of the University of Massachusetts
- Frank Gnup – Award-winning and all-star Canadian football player, and later legendary coach of the University of British Columbia Thunderbirds.
- Pat Kirwan – receivers coach and personnel assistant for the New York Jets under Pete Carroll. Was Senior Football Analyst for the National Football League website.
- Dick Tuckey – former professional American football running back

==== Track & field ====
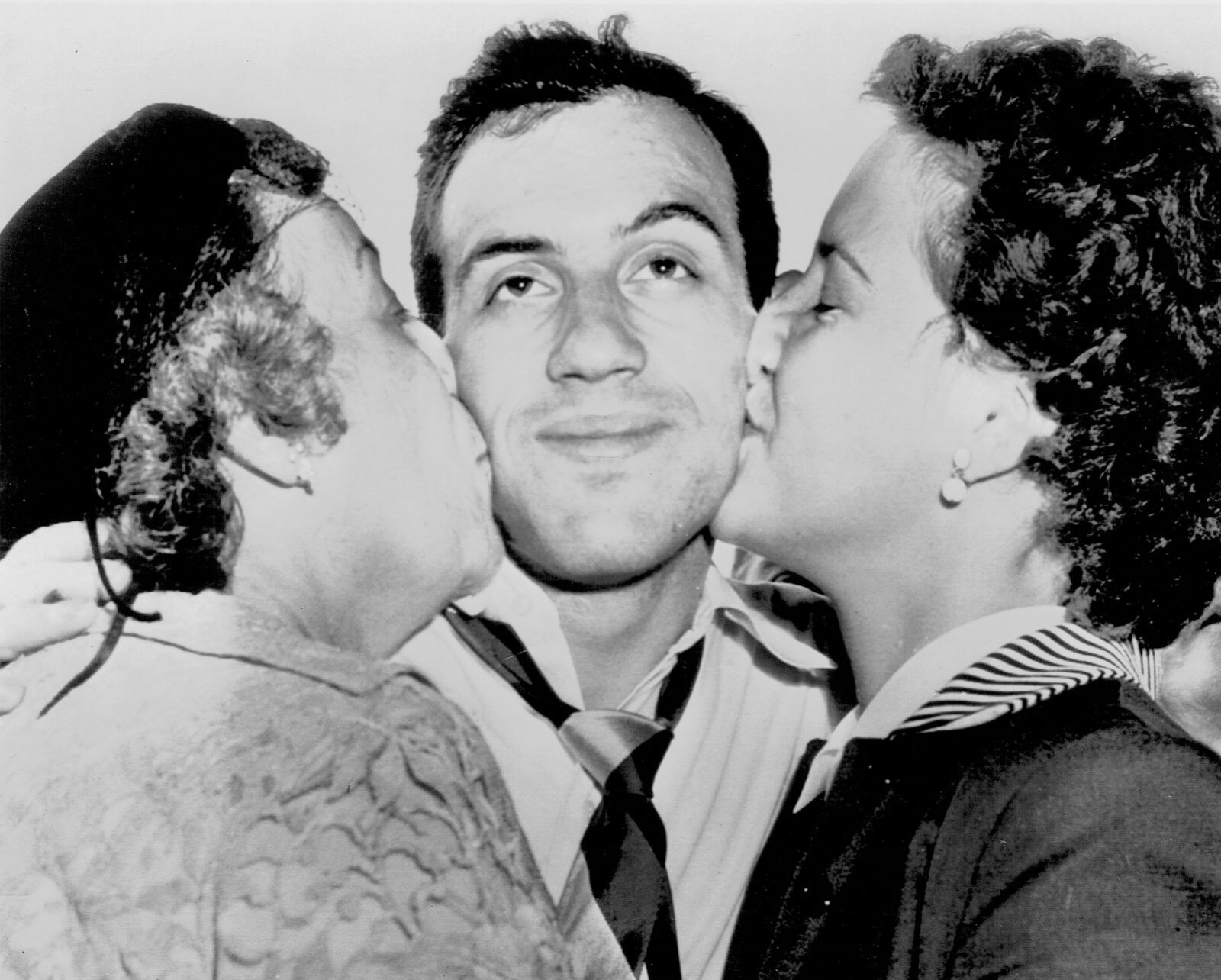
Lindy Remigino

- Steve Agar – Ran in the 1996 Summer Olympics
- Ken Bantum – Participated in the shot put in the 1956 Summer Olympics
- Anthony Colon – Ran in the 1972 Summer Olympics
- Frank Crowley – Ran in the 1932 Summer Olympics
- Lou Jones – World record holder at 400 meters; gold medalist in 4 × 400 meter relay in the 1956 Summer Olympics
- Michael Keogh – Ran in the 1972 Summer Olympics
- Doug Logan – CEO of USA Track & Field; first commission of Major League Soccer
- Tom Murphy – Gold medalist in the men's 800 meters in 1959 Pan American Games, ran in the 1960 Summer Olympics
- Aliann Pompey – Sprinter in the 2000 Summer Olympics, 2004 Summer Olympics, 2008 Summer Olympics, 2012 Summer Olympics
- Dine Potter – Ran in the 1996 Summer Olympics
- Paul Quirke – Participated in the shot put in the 1992 Summer Olympics
- Lindy Remigino – Gold medalist in 100-meter dash and 4 × 100 relay in the 1952 Summer Olympics
- Errol Thurton – Ran in the 1976 Summer Olympics

==== Other sports ====
- Ryan Hall (grappler) – winner of The Ultimate Fighter season 22, professional mixed martial artist in the Ultimate Fighting Championship
- Roderick James "Jess" McMahon Sr. – professional wrestling and professional boxing promoter, grandfather of Vince McMahon
