= List of people from Prescott, Arizona =

The people below were all born in, resident of, or otherwise closely associated with the city of Prescott, Arizona.

- Henry F. Ashurst, first Arizona senator following statehood
- Coles Bashford, lawyer, governor of Wisconsin
- Ken Bennett, state senator, Arizona secretary of state
- Big Nose Kate, Wild West companion of Doc Holliday
- Bret Blevins, comic-book artist
- Michael Broggie, historian and author
- William Mansfield Buffum, merchant and member of the Arizona Territorial Legislature
- Robert Burnham Jr., astronomer
- John G. Campbell, Scottish-born politician
- Thomas Edward Campbell, second governor of Arizona
- Paul. G. Comba, computer scientist and asteroid hunter
- Virginia Lee Corbin, silent film actress
- Antonio De La Fuente, professional boxer
- Rosemary DeCamp, actress
- John Denny, baseball player
- Josephine Earp, wife of lawman Wyatt Earp
- Dorothy Fay, actress
- Alan Dean Foster, science-fiction author
- Ana Frohmiller, county treasurer, gubernatorial candidate
- Barry Goldwater, United States senator and 1964 Republican presidential nominee
- Morris Goldwater, Arizona territorial and state legislator, mayor of Prescott, and businessman
- Paul Gosar, member of the House of Representatives
- Don Imus, radio personality
- John W. Kieckhefer, businessman
- John Kinney, outlaw and founder of the John Kinney Gang (rivals of Billy the Kid's Lincoln County Regulators)
- Fiorello H. LaGuardia, mayor of New York City
- Amy Lukavics, young adult novelist
- Cody Lundin, survival expert, author, and co-star of the Discovery Channel series Dual Survival
- Edith Alice Macia, Arizona pioneer, postmaster, undercover FBI agent
- Jay Miner, integrated circuit designer known as "father of the Amiga"
- Wayman Mitchell, preacher
- Mollie Monroe, Wild West figure
- Kayla Mueller, human rights activist, humanitarian aid worker taken captive by ISIL while working with Medecine sans frontiere
- Buckey O'Neill, mayor of Prescott, sheriff, newspaper editor, miner, and Rough Rider
- Archbishop Peter D. Robinson, United Episcopal Church of North America, rector of St. Paul's Anglican Church
- William C. Rodgers, controversial environmentalist
- William B. Ruger, firearms manufacturer
- Nat Russo, fantasy fiction author, spent childhood and teen years in Prescott; graduated Prescott High School in 1988
- Holly Sampson, adult film actress
- Alvie Self, musician in Rockabilly Hall of Fame
- Frederick Sommer, photographer
- Grace M. Sparkes, booster, secretary of Yavapai County Chamber of Commerce, and manager of Prescott Frontier Days
- Dick Sprang, comic-book artist
- Brian Stauffer, award-winning illustrator
- Sam Steiger, former U.S. congressman and former Mayor of Prescott, 1999–2001
- Piper Stoeckel, Miss Arizona 2012
- Richard Longstreet Tea, Civil War soldier
- Toni Tennille, singer, formerly of Captain and Tennille
- Tom Whittaker, first disabled person to climb Mount Everest
- J. R. Williams, drew the mid-20th century comic strips Out Our Way and The Worry Wart, spent most of his life on a ranch near Prescott
