= Mary Sawyer =

Mary Sawyer may refer to:

- Mary Sawyer (tennis) (born 1957), Australian professional tennis player
- Mollie Monroe (1846–1902), American old west identity, born Mary Sawyer
- Mary Sawyer, Tom Sawyer's female cousin in The Adventures of Tom Sawyer
- Mary Sawyer, later Mary Tyler, the possible inspiration for the poem "Mary Had a Little Lamb"
