= Judith West =

Judith West may refer to:

- Judith West (businesswoman), American businesswoman, political activist and radio personality
- Judith Gay West (born 1949), Australian botanist
- Judith West (umpire), umpire at the 1993 Women's Cricket World Cup final

== See also ==
- Judi West (born 1942), American actress
