= Sam Barone =

American novelist

- Born: Queens, New York City, U.S.
- Occupation: Novelist
- Spouse: Linda Barone
- Writing career
- Genre: Historical fiction
- Notable work: Eskkar series
- Website: www.sambarone.com

Sam Barone (born 20th century) is an American historical fiction novelist with novels about early antiquity. He is known for writing the Eskkar series, beginning with the novel Dawn of Empire.

== Early life and education ==
He was born and raised in Queens, New York.

== Career ==
After a period in the U.S. Marine Corps, he began a career in technology. In 1999, after thirty years of developing software in management, Barone retired from Western Union International, as vice president of International Systems. Seven years later, the Barone's first Eskkar novel, Dawn of Empire (2007), was published in the United States and the united Kingdom. It has since been released worldwide.

History and reading have been two of Barone's favorite interests, and he considers himself more of a storyteller than a writer. "I write stories that I would enjoy reading, and it's a true blessing that others have found these tales interesting, informative, and entertaining."

=== Works ===
Barone's award-winning books have been published in nine languages, and he has more than 180,000 readers worldwide.

- Dawn of Empire (2007). The first novel in the Eskkar Series, this book describes the struggle to build mankind's first walled city, and the fight to defend it. Action packed, the love story of Eskkar and the slave girl Trella is set against the background of a barbarian invasion. First Place in the Arizona Authors Association Literary Contest for published fiction.
- Empire Rising (2008). Picks up the story where Dawn of Empire ends and relates the development and creation of the first city state. This book won Second Place in the Arizona Authors Association Literary Contest for published fiction.
- Conflict of Empires (2010). Also known as Quest for Honour. The third in the Eskkar series begins two years after the events described in Empire Rising. A new threat to the fledgling city state of Akkad has arisen, and Eskkar and Trella are faced with the need to develop a professional army to face the threat of attack from their southern neighbors. Together Eskkar and Trella develop the support structure necessary to wage war. The forces of Akkad will be outnumbered, and only the quality of their new fighting force can save the city. First Place in the Arizona Authors Association Literary Contest for published fiction.
- Eskkar & Trella – The Beginning (2012). The fourth in the Eskkar Series, but the prequel to Dawn of Empire. The story describes Eskkar's early life, his expulsion from the clan of his birth, and his subsequent struggles to survive as he wanders the length and breadth of the Land Between the Rivers. Eskkar grows to manhood learning the skills of a warrior and a leader of men, skills that he will need one day to defend mankind's first walled city. Trella, too, sees her family destroyed, and herself sold into slavery. She must use all the power of her mind to manipulate the men who now own her body. As they journey toward each other and the village of Orak, both are preparing themselves for the epic struggle that will face them, and for the love that will bind them forever. This book won Second Place in the Arizona Authors Association Literary Contest for published fiction.
- Battle for Empire (2012). The fifth book in the Eskkar Series. Eskkar must confront once again the barbarian clan that raised him, this time in a life-and-death struggle. Trella faces the heart-rending decision regarding their son, Sargon, and is forced to banish him from the city of Akkad. At the same time, a new and greater enemy has cast its eyes on the Land Between the Rivers. Eskkar and Trella must face these new challenges while they struggle to reclaim the heir to their empire.

== Personal life ==
Barone and his wife, Linda, live in Prescott, Arizona.

== See also ==
- List of American novelists
- List of historical novelists
- List of Manhattan College alumni
- List of people from Prescott, Arizona
- List of people from Queens
