= Cultural policy of the United States =

Most cultural policy in the United States is enacted at the local and state level, though federal programs also exist to carry out cultural policy. These promote the culture of the United States, including visual art, performing arts, heritage, language, museums, libraries, and sports.

== Policy development ==
The United States does not have a comprehensive federal cultural policy. Most cultural policy in the United States is developed independently by state governments. Direct federal aid is limited outside of historic preservation, and most other cultural programs are primarily funded by the states. The Constitution of the United States mentions the arts explicitly, granting Congress the power to create copyright protections for writers in the Copyright Clause. The Property Clause grants Congress to power to regulate federal lands and territories, allowing for the creation of national parks.

== Arts policy ==
Cultural projects made up 4.5% of the U.S. GDP in 2020, and Americans that work in the arts are significantly more vulnerable to unemployment than in other fields. The National Endowment for the Arts (NEA) is an independent agency of the federal government that funds the arts, and it is the largest funder of arts in the United States. It provides grants to nonprofit organizations, public arts agencies, universities, tribal communities, and individuals. It also facilitates research of the arts and the application of art in other fields. In 2022, $180 million was appropriated for the NEA.

The Copyright Act of 1831 extended copyright protections to musical compositions. The Federal Music Project was created as part of the Works Progress Administration during the Great Depression to support musicians by paying them to write music, provide music instruction, and participate in public performances. The Sound Recording Act of 1971 extended copyright protections to sound recordings. The Music Modernization Act of 2018 amended copyright law to address issues regarding digital music.

== Cultural exchange policy ==
The Department of State oversees cultural exchange programs between the United States and other countries through the Bureau of Educational and Cultural Affairs.

== Heritage policy ==
The United States has many programs and initiatives for preserving heritage and historical culture. The Department of the Interior is responsible for overseeing "historic places, monuments, artifacts, works of art, folklore, knowledge, and landscapes" in the United States. In the late-19th century, laws were passed to set aside areas as national parks, such as Yellowstone National Park in 1872. The Antiquities Act of 1906 was passed to create a system of national monuments overseen by the president and the Department of the Interior. The Historic Sites Act of 1935 extended this power of preservation to historic areas in addition to nature reserves. Oversight of historic areas, such as "forts, monuments, memorials, or battlefield sites" was delegated to the National Park Service. The National Historic Preservation Act of 1966 created the Advisory Council on Historic Preservation and the National Register of Historic Places, and it applied limitations on projects that could damage historic places.

The preservation of Native American cultures is carried out as part of the Federal Indian Policy. The Office of Trust Services, in the Bureau of Indian Affairs, is responsible for working with Native American individuals and tribes to manage trust lands, assets, and resources. The Indian Arts and Crafts Board is responsible for supporting the development of arts and crafts in Native American tribes. The Indian Arts and Crafts Act of 1990 criminalizes the sale of counterfeit Native American art. The Native American Graves Protection and Repatriation Act of 1990 protects cultural items of Native American tribes, including human remains. The Esther Martinez Native American Languages Preservation Act of 2006 established immersion and restoration programs for Native American languages.

== Language policy ==
The United States does not have a comprehensive federal language policy or an official national language. The status of a national language of the United States is a contentious political debate, and many bills establishing English as the official language of the United States have been sponsored in Congress, though none have been passed into law. Federal law guarantees the right to bilingual education for English-language learners.

== Museum and library policy ==
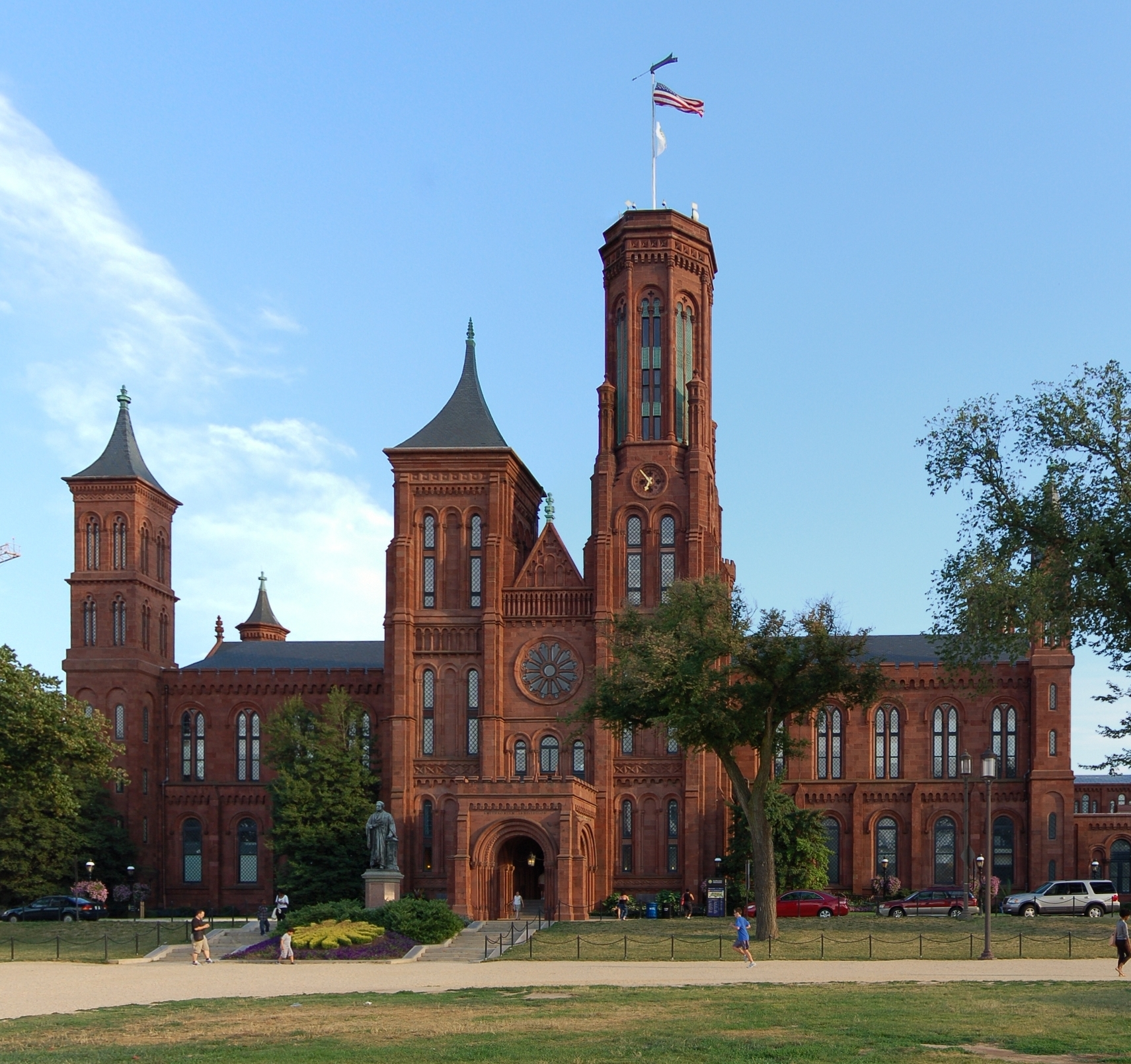
The Smithsonian Institution Building of the Smithsonian Institution.

The Institute of Museum and Library Services (IMLS) is an independent agency of the federal government that develops museum and library policy in the United States. The IMLS also supports museums and libraries through grants and research. It was established in 1996, consolidating federal museum and library programs dating back to 1956. The National Commission on Libraries and Information Science and certain programs of the National Center for Education Statistics were merged into the IMLS in 2008. The National Endowment for the Humanities provides grants to museums, libraries, and archives. Most national museums in the United States are privately owned, though some museums are created by Congress and run by the federal government. National museum status is granted to some private museums, though this is usually honorific and comes with no additional benefits.

The federal government oversees several federal libraries and archives. The Library of Congress is the oldest federal cultural institution in the United States and the largest library in the world. The National Archives and Records Administration is responsible for collecting and preserving historical documents. Federal libraries also exist for specific areas of interest, including the National Agricultural Library, the National Library of Medicine, the National Library of Education, and the presidential library system. The Federal Depository Library Program provides public access to federal government information. The National Library Service for the Blind and Print Disabled provides library services for citizens that cannot access written text due to a disability.

== Sports policy ==
The United States does not have a national regulatory body for sports, and the federal government does not directly fund sports. The United States Olympic & Paralympic Committee is recognized by the federal government and owns sole use of symbols and trademarks associated with the Olympics in the United States, but it operates independently of government involvement. The President's Council on Sports, Fitness, and Nutrition was created in 2019 to organize national policy for youth sports. Professional sports are governed by private sports leagues, which are exempted from federal competition law.

Sports in schools, including college athletics, are governed by Title IX, which prohibits school programs from engaging in sex-based discrimination or sexual harassment. The Protecting Young Victims from Sexual Abuse and Safe Sport Authorization Act expanded on these protections in 2018 to create additional safeguards to prevent sexual abuse in school sports. The Center for SafeSport is responsible for investigating sexual abuse reports under this act.
