= Jamal Robinson =

American basketball player (born 1973)

Old Dominion Monarchs
- Title: Assistant coach
- League: Sun Belt Conference

Personal information
- Born: December 27, 1973 (age 52) Jamaica, New York, U.S.
- Listed height: 6 ft 7 in (2.01 m)
- Listed weight: 212 lb (96 kg)

Career information
- High school: Monsignor McClancy (Queens, New York)
- College: Virginia (1993–1997)
- NBA draft: 1997: undrafted
- Playing career: 1999–2003
- Position: Small forward
- Number: 13
- Coaching career: 2018–present

Career history

Playing
- 1999: Al Riyadi
- 2000: Miami Heat
- 2002–2003: Roanoke Dazzle

Coaching
- 2018–2020: Hampton (assistant)
- 2020–2022: La Salle (assistant)
- 2022–present: Old Dominion (assistant)

Career statistics
- Points: 6 (1.0 ppg)
- Rebounds: 11 (1.8 rpg)
- Steals: 6 (1.0 spg)
- Stats at NBA.com
- Stats at Basketball Reference

Jamal Tyrone Robinson (born December 27, 1973) is an American retired basketball small forward who played one season in the National Basketball Association (NBA) as a member of the Miami Heat during the 2000–01 season. Born in Queens, New York, he attended the University of Virginia where he played for their basketball team. He attended Monsignor McClancy Memorial High School, where he graduated from in 1993. Robinson is the first Monsignor McClancy Memorial High School alumni to play in the NBA. Robinson is now an assistant coach at Old Dominion University.

== Career statistics ==
Legend
GP	Games played	GS	Games started	MPG	Minutes per game
FG%	Field goal percentage	3P%	3-point field goal percentage	FT%	Free throw percentage
RPG	Rebounds per game	APG	Assists per game	SPG	Steals per game
BPG	Blocks per game	PPG	Points per game	**Bold**	Career high

=== NBA ===
==== Regular season ====
Year	Team	GP	GS	MPG	FG%	3P%	FT%	RPG	APG	SPG	BPG	PPG
2000–01	Miami	6	0	12.0	.136	.000	–	1.8	.3	1.0	.0	1.0
