= Cultural policy =

Policy intended to impact the arts, language, heritage, or diversity

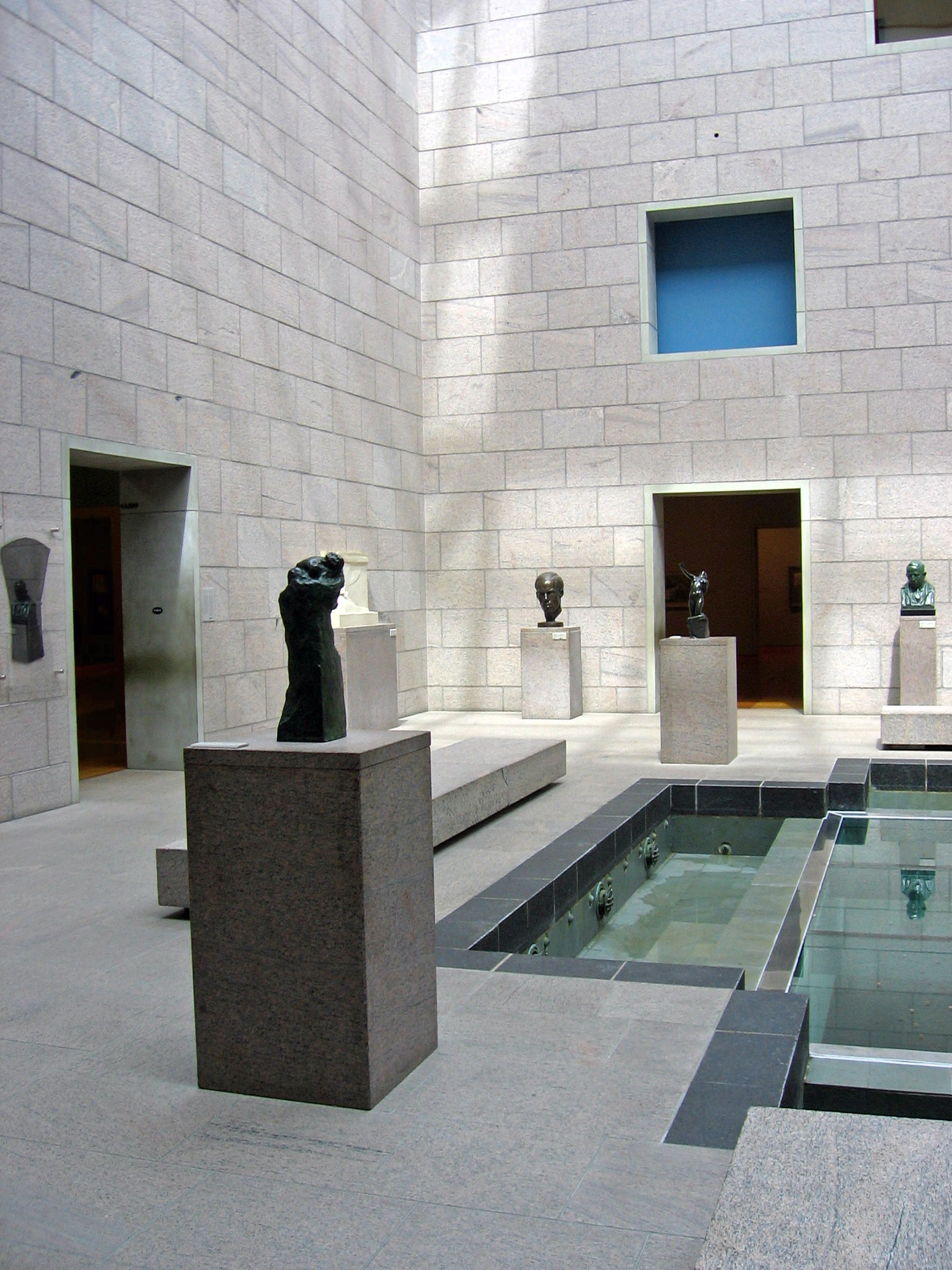
One example of institutions created by governments as part of a country's cultural policy is the creation and ongoing funding of national galleries and museums. Pictured is an interior display area of the National Gallery of Canada.

Cultural policy is the government actions, laws and programs that regulate, protect, encourage and financially (or otherwise) support activities related to the arts and creative sectors, such as painting, sculpture, music, dance, literature, and filmmaking, among others and culture, which may involve activities related to language, heritage and diversity. The idea of cultural policy was developed at UNESCO in the 1960s. Generally, this involves governments setting in place processes, legal classifications, regulations, legislation and institutions (e.g., galleries, museums, libraries, opera houses, etc.) which promote and facilitate cultural diversity and creative expressions in a range of art forms and creative activities. Cultural policies vary from one country to another, but generally they aim to improve the accessibility of arts and creative activities to citizens and promote the artistic, musical, ethnic, sociolinguistic, literary and other expressions of all people in a country. In some countries, especially since the 1970s, there is an emphasis on supporting the culture of Indigenous peoples and marginalized communities and ensuring that cultural industries (e.g., filmmaking or TV production) are representative of a country's diverse cultural heritage and ethnic and linguistic demographics.

Cultural policy can be done at a nation-state level, at a sub-national level (e.g., U.S. states or Canadian provinces), at a regional level or at a municipal level (e.g., a city government creating a museum or arts centre). Examples of cultural policy-making at the nation-state level could include anything from funding music education or theatre programs at little to no cost, to hosting corporate-sponsored art exhibitions in a government museum, to establishing legal codes (such as the U.S. Internal Revenue Service's 501(c)(3) tax designation for not-for-profit enterprises) and creating political institutions (such as the various ministries of culture and departments of culture and the National Endowment for the Humanities and the National Endowment for the Arts in the United States), arts granting councils, and cultural institutions such as galleries and museums. Similar significant organisations in the United Kingdom include the Department for Culture, Media and Sport (DCMS), and Arts Council England.

Throughout much of the twentieth century, many of the activities that compose cultural policy in the 2010s were governed under the title of "arts policy". Arts policy includes direct funding to artists, creators and art institutions and indirect funding to artists and arts institutions through the tax system (e.g., by making donations to arts charities tax-deductible). However, as Kevin Mulcahy has observed, "cultural policy encompasses a much broader array of activities than were addressed under arts policy. Whereas arts policy was effectively limited to addressing aesthetic concerns (e.g., funding art galleries and opera houses), the significance of the transformation to cultural policy can be observed in its demonstrable emphases on cultural identity, valorization of indigineity [Indigenous people's culture] and analyses of historical dynamics (such as hegemony and colonialism)." A general trend in Western industrialized nations is a shift, since the 1970s and 1980s, away from solely supporting a small number of relatively elite, professionalized art forms and institutions (e.g., Classical music, painting, sculpture, art galleries) to also supporting amateur and community cultural and creative activities (e.g., community theatre) and cultural forms which were not considered part of the Western canon by previous generations (e.g., traditional music such as blues, World music, and so on).

== History ==
Prior to the twentieth century, the arts were typically supported by the patronage of the church, aristocrats such as kings and queens, and wealthy merchants. During the nineteenth century, artists increased their use of the private marketplace to earn revenue. For example, the composer Beethoven put on public concerts in the 19th century for which admission was charged. During the twentieth century, governments began to take over some of the arts patronage roles. Governments' first efforts to support culture were typically the establishment of archives, museums and libraries. Over the twentieth century, governments established a range of other institutions, such as arts councils and departments of culture. The first departments of culture typically supported the major arts that are part of the Western canon, such as painting and sculpture, and the major performing arts (Classical music and theatre).

=== Arts policy ===
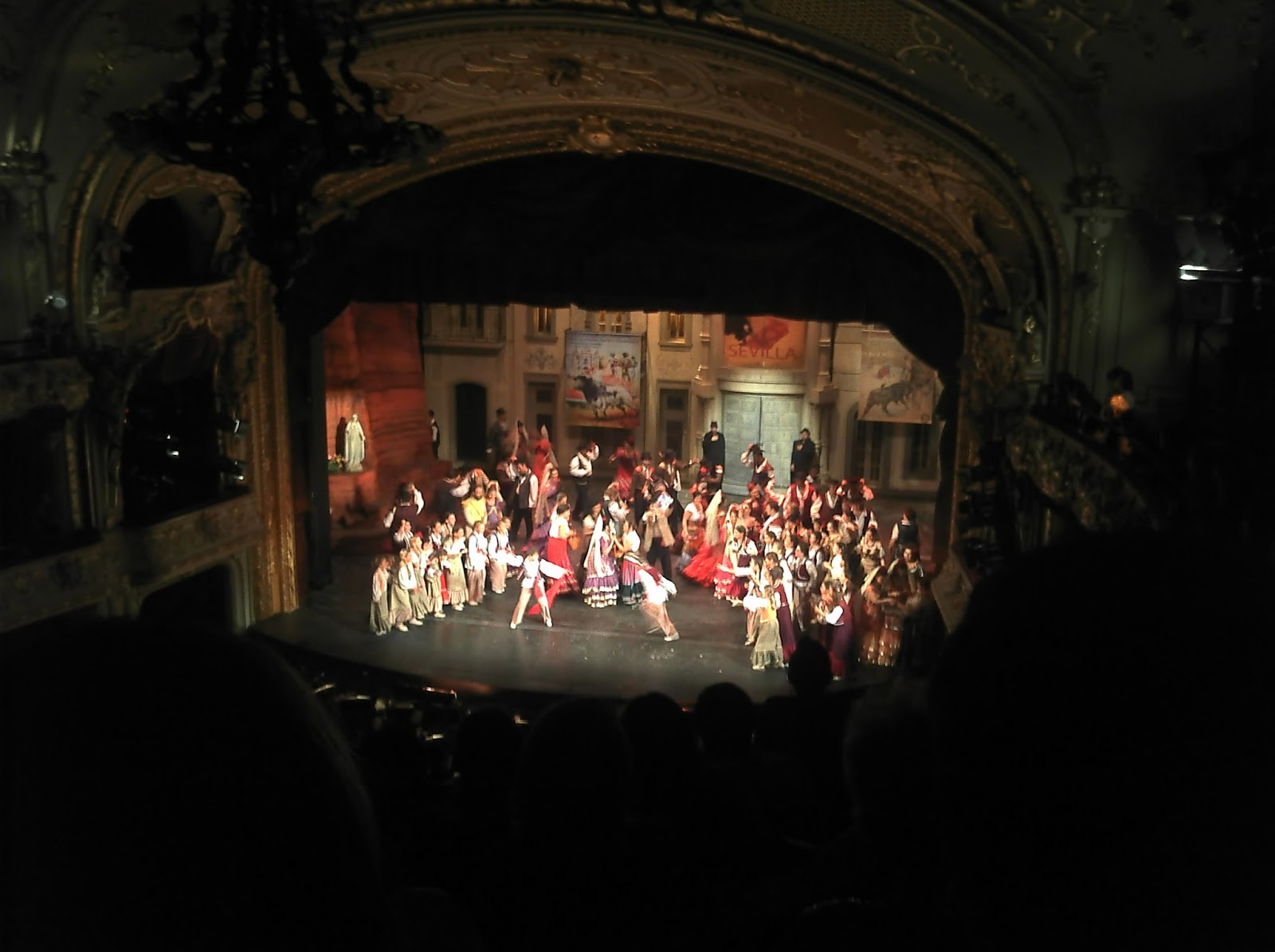
Due to opera productions' huge stage sets, use of many costumed singers and the requirement for an orchestra, opera is one of the most expensive arts to produce. As a result, most opera companies in the 21st century require government funding to operate.

In the twentieth century, Western governments in the U.K., Canada, Australia, New Zealand and many European nations developed arts policy measures to promote, support and protect the arts, artists and arts institutions. These governments' arts policy initiatives generally had two aims: supporting excellence in the arts and broadening access to the arts by citizens. An example of an arts policy initiative that supports excellence would be a government grant program which provides funding to the highest-achieving artists in the country. A concrete example would be a literary prize of $100,000 for the best fiction authors from the country, as selected by a panel of top experts. An example of an arts policy initiative that aims at increasing access to the arts would be a music in the schools program funded by the government. A concrete example would be a program which funded an orchestra or jazz quartet and paid them to play free concerts in elementary schools. This would enable children from lower- and middle-income families to hear live music.

The two goals, supporting excellence and broadening access, are often trade-offs, as any increase in emphasis on one policy objective typically has an adverse effect on the other goal. To give an example, if a hypothetical country has a $12 million per year grant program for orchestras in the country, if the government focuses on the goal of supporting musical excellence, it may decide to provide $4 million per year to the three top orchestras in the country, as determined by a panel of independent professional music critics, conductors and music professors. This decision would strongly support the goal of enhancing excellence, as funding would only go to the top musical groups. However, this approach would only enable citizens in three cities to have access to professional orchestras.

On the other hand, if the government was focusing on broadening access to symphony concerts, it might direct the independent panel to pick 12 orchestras in the country, with the stipulation that only one orchestra per city be selected. By proving $1 million per year to 12 orchestras in 12 cities, this would enable citizens from 12 cities in the country to see live orchestra shows. However, by funding 12 orchestras, this would mean that funding would go to ensembles that do not meet the highest standards of excellence. Thus, excellence and broadening access are often trade-offs.

== Theoretical approaches ==
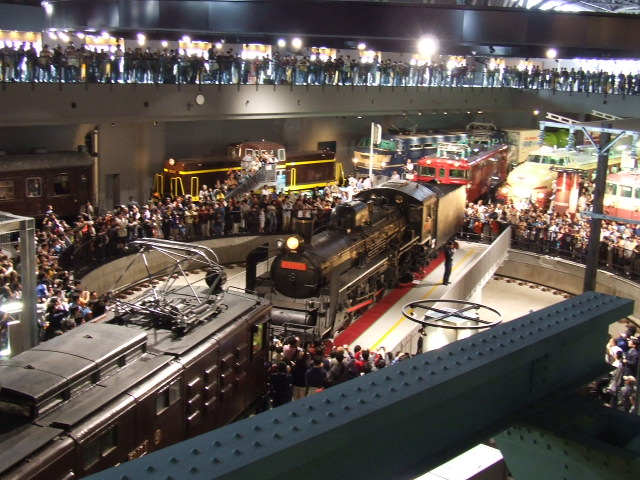
A railway museum in Japan displays antique locomotives.

Cultural policy, while a small part of the budgets of even the most generous of governments, governs a sector of immense complexity. It entails "a large, heterogeneous set of individuals and organizations engaged in the creation, production, presentation, distribution, and preservation of and education about aesthetic heritage, and entertainment activities, products and artifacts". A cultural policy necessarily encompasses a broad array of activities and typically involves public support for:

- Heritage, battlefield and historic preservation sites
- Zoos, botanical gardens, arboretums, aquariums, parks
- Libraries and museums (fine arts, scientific, historical)
- Visual arts (film, painting, sculpture, pottery, architecture)
- Performing arts (symphonic, chamber and choral music; jazz, hip-hop and folk music; ballet, ballroom and modern dance; opera and musical theatre; circus performances, rodeos and marching bands)
- Public humanities programs (public broadcasting, creative writing, poetry)

Some governments may place policy areas from this list in other ministries or departments. For example, national parks may be assigned to an environment department, or public humanities may be delegated to an education department.

Since culture is a public good (i.e., contributes a public value to society for which it is hard to exclude non-payers, as all of society benefits from arts and culture) and something that is generally viewed as a merit good, governments have pursued programs to promote greater accessibility. In this way of thinking, significant aesthetic works such as paintings and sculptures should be made broadly available to the public. In other words, "high culture" should not be the exclusive preserve of a particular social class or of a metropolitan location. Rather, the benefits of the highest reaches of cultural excellence should be made in an egalitarian manner; national cultural treasures should be accessible without regard to the impediments of class circumstances, educational attainment or place of habitation. A democratic state cannot be seen as simply indulging the aesthetic preferences of a few, however enlightened, or of overtly infusing art with political values. Consequently, a democratic cultural policy must articulate its purposes in ways that demonstrate how the public interest is being served. These purposes have often been expressed as involving either the creation of cultural democracy or the democratization of culture.

The objective of cultural democratization is the aesthetic enlightenment, enhanced dignity, and educational development of the general citizenry. "Dissemination was the key concept with the aim of establishing equal opportunity for all citizens to participate in publicly organized and financed cultural activities". To further this goal, performances and exhibitions are low cost; public art education promotes equality of aesthetic opportunity; national institutions tour and perform in work places, retirement homes and housing complexes.

As indicated earlier, the "democratization of culture" is a top-down approach that promulgates certain forms of cultural programming that are deemed to be a public good. Clearly, such an objective is open to criticism for what is termed cultural elitism; that is, the assumption that some aesthetic expressions are inherently superior - at least as determined by a cognoscenti concerned with the acquisition of cultural capital. "The problem with this policy [is] that, fundamentally, it intend[s] to create larger audiences for performances whose content [is] based on the experience of society's privileged groups. In sum, it has... taken for granted that the cultural needs of all society's members [are] alike". The objective of cultural democracy, on the other hand, is to provide for a more participatory (or populist) approach in the definition and provision of cultural opportunities.

The coupling of the concept of democratization of culture to cultural democracy has a pragmatic as well as a philosophical component. Cultural patronage in democratic governments is markedly different from patronage by wealthy individuals or corporations. Private or politically paramount patrons are responsible only to themselves and are free to indulge in their tastes and preferences. Democratic governments, on the other hand, are responsible to the electorate and are held accountable for their policy decisions.

The two objectives just discussed - dissemination of high culture and participation in a broader range of cultural activities - evoke a related debate about the content of public culture: "elitist" or "populist."

=== Elitism ===
Proponents of the elitist position argue that cultural policy should emphasize aesthetic quality as the determining criterion for public subvention. This view is typically supported by the major cultural organizations, creative artists in the traditionally defined field of the fine arts, cultural critics, and the well-educated, well-to-do audiences for these art forms. Ronald Dworkin terms this the "lofty approach," which "insists that art and culture must reach a certain degree of sophistication, richness, and excellence in order for human nature to flourish, and that the state must provide this excellence if the people will not or cannot provide it for themselves". Advocates of the elitist position generally focus on supporting the creation, preservation and performance of works of the Western canon, a group of artworks that are viewed as the best artistic and cultural products of Western society.

=== Populism ===
By contrast, the populist position advocates defining culture broadly and inclusively and making this culture broadly available. The populist approach emphasizes a less traditional and more pluralist notion of artistic merit and consciously seeks to create a policy of cultural diversity. With a focus on personal enhancement, the populist's position posits very limited boundaries between amateur and professional arts activities. Indeed, the goal is to provide opportunities for those outside the professional mainstream. To give an example, whereas an elite approach advocates support for professional musicians, particularly those from Classical music, a populist approach would advocate support for amateur, community singers and musicians.

"Proponents of populism are frequently advocates of minority arts, folk arts, ethnic arts, or counter-cultural activities" as Kevin V. Mulcahy said. Cultural "elitists," on the other hand, argue in support of excellence over amateurism and favor an emphasis on aesthetic discipline over "culture as everything." There are "two key tensions for national cultural policy between the goals of excellence versus access, and between government roles as facilitator versus architect".

Kevin V. Mulcahy argued that in effect, elitism is cultural democracy as populism is to the democratization of culture. Unfortunately, there has been a tendency to see these positions as mutually exclusive, rather than complementary. "Elitists" are denounced as "high brow snobs" advocating an esoteric culture which focuses on art music and the types of art seen in museums and galleries; populists are dismissed as "pandering philistines" promoting a trivialized and commercialized culture, as they endorse the value of popular music and folk art. However, these mutual stereotypes belie complementariness between two bookends of an artistically autonomous and politically accountable cultural policy. There is a synthesis that can be termed a "latitudinarian approach" to public culture; that is, one that is aesthetically inclusive and broadly accessible.

=== Glocalization of arts ===
Musicologists David Hebert and Mikolaj Rykowski write that when "music is recognized as invaluable cultural heritage, entailing unique artefacts of intellectual property, new developments in this field then become acknowledged as important forms of social innovation;" However, they caution policy-makers that with glocalization, the rise of "'big data' offers unprecedentedly powerful tools but also inevitably entails many risks for all kinds of artists (both musicians and their collaborators in other arts) as well as the sustainability of traditional cultural practices."

== Viewpoints ==
Such a public-cultural policy would remain faithful to the highest standards of excellence from a broad range of aesthetic expressions while providing the widest possible access to people from different geographic locales, socio-economic strata, and educational background, as Dr. Mulcahy said. In conceiving of public policy as an opportunity to provide alternatives not readily available in the marketplace, public cultural agencies would be better positioned to complement the efforts of the private sector rather than duplicate their activities. Similarly, cultural agencies can promote community development by supporting artistic heritages that are at a competitive disadvantage in a cultural world that is increasingly profit-driven. In sum, excellence should be viewed as the achievements of greatness from a horizontal, rather than a vertical, perspective and a cultural policy as supporting the totality of these varieties of excellence.

These attitudes about a public cultural responsibility stand in marked contrast to much of the rest of the world, where culture is a question of historic patrimony, or the national identities of peoples, whether in independent states or regions within more powerful states. Inevitably, sensitive issues are involved in any discussion of culture as a public policy. However, given the demands in a democratic system that public policies show a return to the taxpayer, cultural policy has frequently argued for support on the basis of utility. It can be argued that there is a parity between the state's responsibility for its citi' social-economic-physical needs and their access to culture and opportunities for artistic self-expression. However, the aesthetic dimension of public policy has never been widely perceived as intuitively obvious or politically imperative. Accordingly, the cultural sector has often argued its case from the secondary, ancillary benefits that result from public support for programs that are seemingly only aesthetic in nature. Cultural policy is not typically justified solely on the grounds that it is a good-in-itself, but rather that it yields other good results.

The future of cultural policy would seem to predict an increasingly inexorable demand that the arts "carry their own weight" rather than rely on a public subsidy to pursue "art for art's sake". Kevin V. Mulcahy dubbed this "cultural Darwinism" is most pronounced in the United States where public subsidy is limited and publicly supported aesthetic activities are expected to demonstrate a direct public benefit. Non-American cultural institutions are less constrained by the need to maintain diversified revenue streams that demand high levels of earned income and individual and corporate donations to compensate for limited government appropriations.

On the other hand, cultural institutions everywhere are increasingly market-driven in their need for supplementary funds and as a justification for continued public support. The American model of an essentially privatized culture is increasingly attractive to governments seeking to curtail their cultural subsidies. In a system of mixed funding, public culture can nurture the arts groups and cultural activities that contribute to individual self-worth and community definition even if counting for less in the economic bottom-line. At root, a cultural policy is about creating public spheres that are not dependent upon profit motives nor validated by commercial values. As political democracy is dependent upon the existence of civil society and socio-economic pluralism, cultural policy stands as an essential public commitment in realizing these fundamental preconditions.

One of the available and yet underappreciated tools in cultural policy at the national level is the reduction of VAT rates for cultural goods and services. Economic theory can be used to explain how reduced fiscal rates are expected to decrease prices and increase quantities of consumed cultural goods and services. Fiscal policy can be an important part of cultural policy, in particular the VAT rate discounts on cultural consumption, yet it receives less attention than deserved.

== Scope ==
At the international level UNESCO is in charge of cultural policy. Contact information for ministries of culture and national arts councils in 160 countries is available from the website of the International Federation of Arts Councils and Culture Agencies (IFACCA). On a local scale, subnational (e.g., state or provincial governments), city and local governments offer citizens and local authorities the opportunity to develop arts and culture with the Agenda 21 for Culture.

== Research ==
Cultural Policy Research (or Cultural Policy Studies) is a field of academic inquiry that grew out of Cultural Studies in the 1990s. A quarter of a century later, by now both “Cultural Policy Research” and "Cultural Policy Studies" each match almost 100 million entries in the World Wide Web.

Cultural Policy Research grew out of the idea that cultural studies should not only be critical, but also try to be useful. The Princeton University e.g. founded its Center for Arts and Cultural Policy Studies 1994 “to improve the clarity, accuracy and sophistication of discourse about the nation's artistic and cultural life.”

The scientific approach is genuinely interdisciplinary, combining social sciences, a wide range of the humanities, jurisprudence and economics. As all political sciences do, the research focuses on the content dimension (policy), the formal-institutional dimension (polity) and the practical dimension (politics), particularly affecting decision processes and the results obtained. Cultural Policy Research asks: What do the actors and agents in the Cultural Policy sphere actually do when they do what they do? Which purposes they do pursue by that? What are their goals and which means do they use? What is the result of their action for society and for the citizens’ intellectual and artistic freedom?

Among the many departments of Cultural Policy Studies around the world, there are several UNESCO Chairs in Cultural Policy from the programme launched in 1992 by the UNESCO to promote international inter-university cooperation:

- (412) Vilnius, Lithuania :UNESCO Chair in Cultural Policy and Cultural Management (1998), Vilnius Academy of Arts
- (436) Debrecen, Hungary: UNESCO Chair in Cultural Policy and Cultural Management (1999), Lajos Kossuth University of Arts and Sciences, Debrecen
- (454) Lomé, Togo: Chaire UNESCO sur les politiques culturelles pour le développement (1999), Centre régional d'action culturelle (CRAC)
- (527) Girona, Spain / Catalunya: Chaire UNESCO en matière de Politiques et de Coopération Culturelles (2001), Universitat de Girona
- (546) Barcelona, Spain / Catalunya: Chaire UNESCO d'études interculturelles (2001), Université Pompeu Febra de Barcelone
- (572) Barcelona, Spain / Catalunya: Chaire UNESCO de Diversité linguistique et culturelle (2002), Institut d'Etudes catalanes
- (654) Thessaloniki, Greece: Chaire UNESCO de politique interculturelle pour une citoyenneté active et solidaire (2004), Université de Macédoine
- (827) Kazan, Russia-Tatarstan: UNESCO Chair in Eurosian studies, Cultural Diversity and Cultural Policies (2008), Kazan State University
- (851) Buenos Aires, Argentine: Chaire UNESCO d’esthétique et sociologie de la différence et de la diversité culturelle en Argentine (2009), Universidad Nacional Tres de Febrero
- (978) Hildesheim, Germany: UNESCO Chair in Cultural Policy for the Arts in Development ”(2012), Department of Cultural Policy at University of Hildesheim.

== See also ==
- Arts council
- Cultural Institutions Studies
- Walden Two#Cultural engineering
- Cultural subsidy
- Cultural diplomacy
- Cultural policies of the European Union
- Cultural policy in Abu Dhabi
- Cultural policy of the United States
- Social policy

== Bibliography ==
- Madden, C, 2009, 'The Independence of Government Arts Funding: A Review', D'Art Topics in Arts Policy, No. 9, International Federation of Arts Councils and Culture Agencies, Sydney, www.ifacca.org/themes
- Marcello Sorce Keller, "Why is Music so Ideological, Why Do Totalitarian States Take It So Seriously: A Personal View from History, and the Social Sciences", Journal of Musicological Research, XXVI(2007), no. 2–3, pp. 91–122;
- Marja Heimonen & David G. Hebert, "Pluralism and Minority Rights in Music Education: Implications of the Legal and Social Philosophical Dimensions," Visions of Research in Music Education, Vol.15 (2010).
- Mario d'Angelo, Paul Vesperini, Cultural Policies in Europe (a series in four volumes) : 1) A comparative Approach 2) Regions and Decentralization 3) Method and Practice of Evaluation 4) Local Issues, Council of Europe Publishing, Strasbourg, 1999–2001.
- Philippe Poirrier (Ed.), Pour une histoire des politiques culturelles dans le monde, 1945-2011, La Documentation française, Paris, 2011.
- Dave O'Brien, Cultural Policy: Management, Value and Modernity in the Creative Industries, Routledge, Abingdon, 2014.
- Tony Bennett, Culture, A reformer's Science, SAGE, London, 1998.
- Jim McGuigan, Rethinking Cultural Policy, Open University Press, Milton Keynes, 2004.
