= Cardinal Spellman High School (New York City) =

Catholic school in Bronx, New York, United States

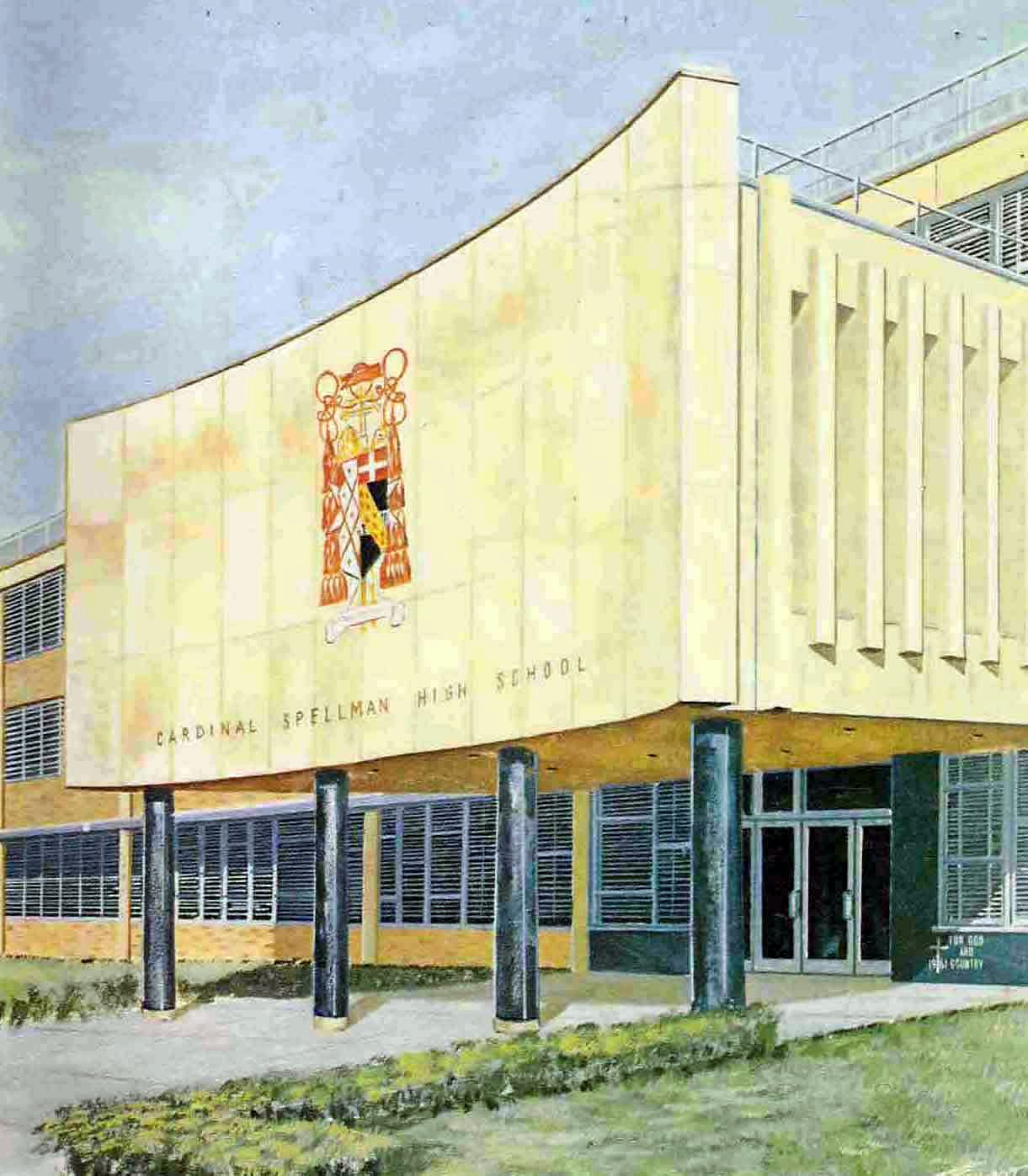
- Main entrance

Location
- One Cardinal Spellman Place (1991 Needham Avenue); Bronx, New York 10466; United States
- Coordinates: 40°52′59″N 73°50′26″W

Information
- Type: Catholic, Co-educational
- Motto: Sequere Deum (Follow God)
- Religious affiliation: Catholic Church
- Established: 1959 (67 years ago)
- Founder: Francis Cardinal Spellman
- President: Therese McNicholas
- Principal: Jeri Faulkner
- Grades: 9–12
- Campus size: 13 acres
- Colors: Red and White
- Slogan: "Where Boys and Girls with Dreams Become Men and Women of Vision"
- Athletics: Boys/girls cross country, boys/girls track (indoor and outdoor), boys/girls soccer, boys/girls volleyball, boys/girls lacrosse, boys/girls basketball, bowling, cheerleading, football, baseball, softball, swimming, e-sports, flag football
- Mascot: Male and Female Pilot
- Nickname: The Pilots
- Team name: Pilots
- Accreditation: Middle States Association of Colleges and Schools
- Newspaper: Pilot
- Yearbook: Vanguard
- School fees: Varies by grade year
- Tuition: $11,250 per year
- Website: cardinalspellman.org

Cardinal Spellman High School is an American Catholic high school in the borough of the Bronx in New York City, New York. The school is chartered by the Board of Regents of the University of the State of New York and is accredited by the Middle States Association of Colleges and Schools. It is named after Cardinal Francis Spellman, the sixth archbishop of the Archdiocese of New York.

== History ==
In September 1959, the newly created Cardinal Spellman High School opened in temporary quarters (formerly, the Biograph Motion Picture Studios of Thomas Alva Edison) on Marmion Avenue in the Tremont section of the Bronx. Its permanent location on Baychester Avenue, between Boston Road and East 233rd Street in Edenwald, covers thirteen acres (including ball fields, grandstands, running track, and parking lots). The founding principal was Msgr. John Breheny, PhD.

Cardinal Spellman personally dedicated the new school facilities on May 27, 1962. Many years later, the name of Needham Avenue, in front of the school, was officially changed by then Bronx Borough President and alumnus Fernando Ferrer to Cardinal Spellman Place.

At first the school was co-institutional, with separate classes for boys (staffed by diocesan priests, Brothers of the Christian Schools and laymen) and for girls (staffed by the Sisters of Charity of Mount St. Vincent and laywomen). Each of the two departments (Boys' and Girls') had its own principal and assistant principal, and (to coordinate) a Principal of the School. In Fall 1971, the co-institutional model was changed to the current co-ed system.

In May 1963, Cardinal Spellman High School was admitted to the University of the State of New York and thus accredited by the Board of Regents of the State. Accreditation by the Middle States Association of Colleges and Secondary Schools was first announced on December 2, 1965, and was renewed in December, 1976 This accreditation has been renewed regularly in 1977, 1982, 1986, 1997 and most recently.

== Notable alumni ==
- Knox Cameron, professional soccer player (MLS, Columbus Crew)
- Kevin Corrigan, playwright, actor (attended, but is not a graduate)
- Keith R.A. DeCandido (class of 1986), author (novels Star Trek, Supernatural)
- John M. Fahey, Jr., president and CEO of the National Geographic Society
- Fernando Ferrer, former Bronx borough president
- Tomiko Fraser, model and actress
- Nakia D. Johnson, novelist
- Clinton Leupp, drag performer, better known by his drag persona "Miss Coco Peru," and actor (films ''To Wong Foo, Thanks for Everything! Julie Newmar and Trick)
- General Arthur Lichte (class of 1967), commander in United States Air Force
- Chris Manhertz (class of 2010), professional NFL football player
- Liam McLaughlin, Yonkers inspector general (since 2020); former Yonkers City Council president
- Kwame Onwuachi, celebrity chef and cookbook author
- Nicholas Padilla (class of 2014), baseball player
- Orio Palmer (class of 1974), Battalion Chief of the New York City Fire Department who died while rescuing occupants of World Trade Center on September 11, 2001
- Angelo Parra (class of 1967), award-winning playwright and educator
- Carolyn Porco (class of 1970), planetary scientist
- John E. Potter (class of 1973), former Postmaster General of the United States; president and CEO of the Metropolitan Washington Airports Authority
- Anthony Ribustello (class of 1984), actor (television series The Sopranos); former candidate in the 2009 Bronx Borough President special election
- John Patrick Shanley, playwright, screenwriter, director (attended, but is not a graduate)
- Sonia Sotomayor (class of 1972), Associate Justice of Supreme Court of the United States
- Mary Ann Tighe, CEO, CBRE Group New York Tri-State Region
- Paula Williams Madison, journalist, writer, businessperson, executive and former NBCUniversal
