= Kenneth Chenault =

American business executive (born 1951)

Ken Chenault
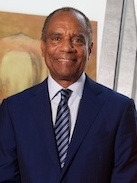
- Chenault in 2012
- Born: Kenneth Irvine Chenault; June 2, 1951 (age 75); Mineola, New York, U.S.
- Education: Bowdoin College (BA); Harvard University (JD)
- Title: Former chairman and CEO of American Express
- Spouse: Kathryn Chenault
- Children: 2

Kenneth Irvine Chenault (born June 2, 1951) is an American businessman who was chairman and chief executive officer (CEO) of American Express (AMEX) from 2001 to 2018.

When he was named AMEX chair, he became the third Black CEO of a Fortune 500 company. Since 2018, he has been chairman and managing director of General Catalyst, a venture capital firm.

In 2026 he published a book, Equal to the Task: A Life Forged Between America's Promise and Its Truth.

== Early life and education ==
Chenault, who is of African American heritage, was born in Mineola, New York. His mother, Anne N. Quick Chenault, was a dental hygienist, and his father, Dr. Hortenius Chenault, was a dentist, who graduated from Morehouse College and Howard University College of Dentistry, and passed the New York State dental exam with the highest score ever recorded as of January 2014.

Kenneth Chenault attended the Waldorf School of Garden City, where he was senior class president. He received a B.A. in history from Bowdoin College in 1973. After Bowdoin, Chenault attended Harvard Law School, where he received his J.D. in 1976.

== Career ==
Chenault began his career as an associate at the law firm Rogers & Wells (1977–1979) in New York City, and as a consultant for Bain & Company (1979–1981).

=== American Express ===
Chenault worked 37 years at American Express, a financial services corporation and bank holding company. He joined the company in 1981, working in its Strategic Planning Group. He became president and chief operating officer in 1997. He became CEO of American Express in 2001.

As CEO of American Express in 2007 and 2008, Chenault earned a total compensation of $50,126,585 and $42,752,461 respectively. In 2009, he earned a total compensation of $16,617,639, which included a base salary of $1,201,923, a cash bonus of $10,450,000, an option grant of $3,985,637, and other compensation worth $980,079. In 2016, Chenault earned a total compensation of $22 million.

On November 15, 2010, Old North Foundation recognized Chenault with its Third Lantern Award for individual commitment and dedication to public service. The Foundation honored Chenault and American Express for their significant contributions to the preservation efforts of many significant monuments and landmark structures, including the steeple of the Old North Church.

On October 18, 2017, he announced that he would retire as its chairman and chief executive on February 1, 2018. He was succeeded by Stephen J. Squeri.

=== General Catalyst ===
In January 2018, Chenault announced he would become chairman and managing director of General Catalyst Partners.

== Board affiliations ==
Chenault has sat on several boards throughout his career. Beginning in 2007, he was on the executive committee of the Business Roundtable and a member of the Council on Foreign Relations.

In 2011 and 2012, Chenault was a member of the executive committee of The Business Council.

On February 10, 2014, it was announced that he had been elected to fill a vacated seat of the Harvard Corporation; the Corporation is the chief fiduciary authority of the university and is the smaller of the two governing boards, the other being the Harvard Board of Overseers.

On February 6, 2017, Chenault was named chair of the advisory council for the Smithsonian's National Museum of African American History and Culture.

In 2018, he joined the board of directors of Airbnb.

From February 2018 to March 2020, he was on the board of directors of Facebook.

In December 2018, it was announced that Chenault would step down from his board roles at IBM and Procter & Gamble on February 13, 2019.

In April 2019, he was appointed as a member of the NCAA's Board of Governors.

In March 2020, he joined the board of Berkshire Hathaway, replacing Bill Gates.

He is a co-founder of OneTen, a non-profit organization that creates job opportunities for individuals without four year degrees.

He is a board member of National September 11 Memorial and Museum at the World Trade Center, Bloomberg Philanthropies, the Council on Foreign Relations, the Human Centered Artificial Intelligence Institute Advisory Council at Stanford University, and NYU Langone Health.

== Philanthropy ==
Chenault and wife, Kathryn, are founding donors to the Art for Justice Fund, which aims to reduce prison populations and strengthen employment opportunities for those leaving.

== Personal life ==
Chenault and his family reside in New York City.

== Honors and awards ==
- 1995 -- Ebony listed him as one of 50 "living pioneers" in the African-American community.
- 1996 -- Honorary degree from Bowdoin College, his alma mater.
- 2002 -- Junior Achievement U.S. Business Hall of Fame
- 2008 -- Commencement speaker, Howard University.
- 2010 -- Commencement speaker, Wake Forest University
- 2010 -- Commencement speaker, Northeastern University.
- 2021 -- Time 100, Time's annual list of the 100 most influential people in the world.
- 2024 -- Speaker, 2024 Democratic National Convention in support of Kamala Harris and Tim Walz.

Business positions
Preceded by Harvey Golub	CEO of American Express; 2001–2018	Succeeded by Stephen Squeri
