= Monsignor McClancy Memorial High School =

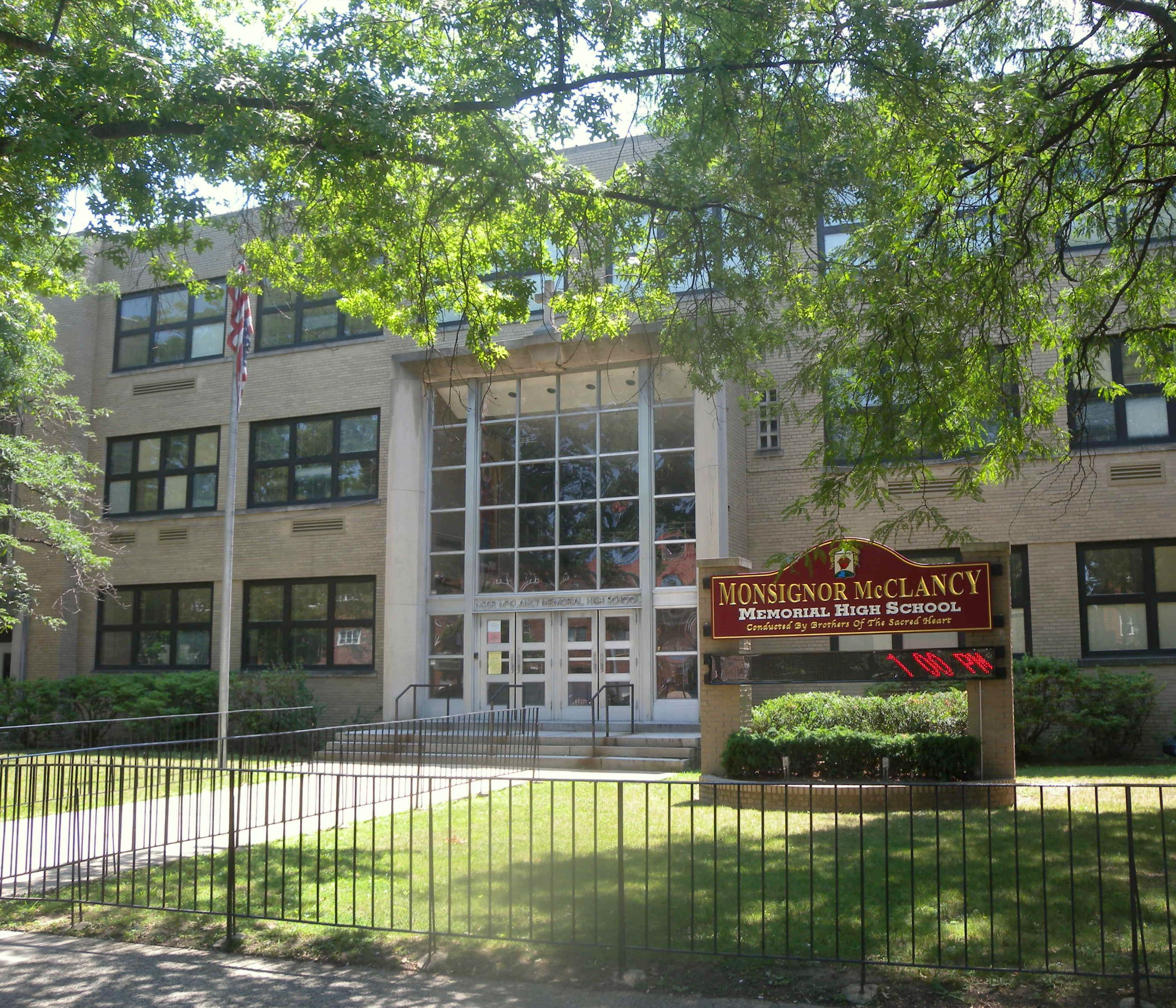
- 31st Avenue entrance

Location
- 71-06 31st Avenue; New York (East Elmhurst, Queens), New York 11370; United States; 40°45′29″N 73°53′43″W

Information
- Type: Private, Co-ed
- Religious affiliations: Roman Catholic; Brothers of the Sacred Heart
- Established: 1956
- Status: Open
- President: Nicholas Melito
- Principal: James Castrataro
- Staff: 26
- Faculty: 35
- Grades: 9-12
- Enrollment: 850 (2025)
- Colors: Scarlet and White
- Slogan: The school that makes a difference.
- Mascot: The Crusader
- Team name: The Crusaders
- Rivals: Archbishop Molloy High School, St. John's Prep, St. Edmund Prep, Saint Francis Preparatory School, etc.
- Accreditation: Middle States Association of Colleges and Schools
- Newspaper: The Sentinel
- Yearbook: The McClancian
- Tuition: $11,300
- Affiliation: Brothers of the Sacred Heart
- Website: www.msgrmcclancy.org

Monsignor McClancy Memorial High School is a co-educational Catholic high school located in the East Elmhurst neighborhood of Queens, New York. Founded by the Brothers of the Sacred Heart in 1956, Msgr. McClancy Memorial High School serves the Roman Catholic Diocese of Brooklyn. The school is named for Joseph V. McClancy, who was Superintendent of Schools. Originally a boys school, they began accepting female students in 2012. As of 2024, the school provides education for approximately 800 students from grades 9 to 12. Admissions is open to any student of any ethnicity and of any faith, but requires TACHS (Test for Admission into Catholic High Schools) scores from students entering from the 8th grade; students on other levels contact the school directly.

The school is chartered by the Board of Regents of the University of the State of New York and accredited by the Middle States Association of Colleges and Schools.

McClancy draws students from eighty-five parochial and public schools located throughout Brooklyn, Queens, Bronx, Manhattan, Long Island, Staten Island, and across the world.

== Athletics ==
The McClancy athletics program includes:

- Basketball – boys and girls
- Baseball – boys
- Softball – girls
- Table Tennis – boys and girls
- Tennis – boys and girls
- Volleyball – boys and girls
- Soccer – boys and girls
- Track and field – boys and girls
- Bowling – boys and girls
- Swimming and diving – boys and girls
- Handball – boys and girls
- Cheerleading – girls
- Golf – boys and girls
- Hockey – boys and girls
- Gaelic Football - boys

== Renovations ==
The school's biology, chemistry, and physics labs were renovated over the summer of 2011. Over the summer of 2012, the school created a new media center and a new art studio. The school has also undergone an extensive renovation project in 2021 which included soundproofing and air conditioning for each classroom. It also implemented tighter security in the building and classrooms though implementations of bullet-proof doors. In April 2022, the new Stephen J. Squeri '77 Sports Complex was completed due to a special donation from alumni, and current American Express CEO, Steve Squeri. It is the first high school in the U.S. to have incorporate the Anatomage Table, which provides students and an immersive way to explore human anatomy

== Notable alumni ==
- George Bruns, former NBA player for New York Nets (1972–73)
- Eddie Buczynski, Wiccan and gay rights activist (1947-1989)
- Rich Conaty, radio disc jockey
- Don Cooper, pitching coach for Chicago White Sox (2002–2020); played for New York Yankees (1985)
- Michael DenDekker, politician
- John Kenrick, theatre writer
- Walter McCaffrey, politician
- Chris Megaloudis, former soccer player for New York Red Bulls
- Tom Nohilly, retired track athlete
- Jamal Robinson, former NBA player for Miami Heat in 2000
- Stephen Squeri, current chairman and CEO of American Express
- Nyika Williams, basketball player
