= Stephen Squeri =

CEO of American Express

Stephen J. Squeri
- Born: 1959; Astoria, New York, United States
- Other names: Stephen Joseph Squeri, Stephen J. Squeri, Steve Squeri
- Education: Monsignor McClancy High School
- Alma mater: Manhattan University (BS, MBA)
- Occupation: Business executive
- Years active: 1980s-present
- Organization: American Express
- Title: Chairman and CEO
- Term: 2018-present
- Predecessor: Kenneth Chenault
- Board member of: American Express, Manhattan University, Monsignor McClancy Memorial High School

Stephen J. Squeri (born 1959) is an American business executive. He is chairman and CEO of American Express. Squeri first joined American Express in 1985, becoming chief information officer in 2005 and vice chairman in 2015, along with other upper management roles.

Squeri is currently chairman of the Manhattan University board of trustees, a board member at the Partnership for New York City, and on the board of trustees of Memorial Sloan Kettering Cancer Center, The Valerie Fund, and the Paley Center for Media. He is also on the board of governors of Monsignor McClancy Memorial High School, and a member of the Business Roundtable, the American Society of Corporate Executives, and the New York Jobs CEO Council, among other roles. TIME named him one of the 100 Most Influential People of 2025.

== Early life and education ==
Stephen "Steve" Joseph Squeri was born in 1959 in New York City. He is the grandchild of Italian and Irish immigrants. His father worked as an accountant in New York for companies such as Colgate, CBS, and Bloomingdale's. Squeri grew up in Astoria, Queens, graduating from Monsignor McClancy High School in East Elmhurst in 1977. Squeri subsequently attended Manhattan College in the Bronx, graduating with a bachelor of science in 1981 and an MBA in 1986.

== Career ==
Beginning in 1981, Squeri spent four years as a management consultant at Arthur Andersen.

Squeri joined American Express in 1985 as a manager in the Travelers Cheque Group and became an American Express vice president in 1990. From 2000 to 2002 he served as president of the Establishment Services group in the United States and Canada, and from 2002 to 2005 he was president of the Global Commercial Card division. In 2005, he began serving as chief information officer of American Express. He held the role until October 2009, during which time he also led Corporate Development, overseeing mergers and acquisitions.

In 2009, he was named group president of Global Services. He then served as American Express' group president of Global Corporate Services until 2015. He became vice chairman of American Express in July 2015, and also began leading the business-to-business group in October 2015. According to Forbes, the American Express board of directors began considering Squeri to be CEO in 2015.

Squeri became chairman and CEO of American Express on February 1, 2018, having been appointed by the board of directors to succeed Kenneth Chenault. In 2023, Squeri's total compensation at American Express was $35.6 million, representing a CEO-to-median worker pay ratio of 677-to-1. For 2024, Squeri's total compensation was $37.1 million. In April 2025, TIME named him one of the 100 Most Influential People of 2025.

== Boards and committees ==
After joining the board of trustees at Manhattan University in 2013, he was named chair in 2023. He is also on the board of the Partnership for New York City, on the board of governors of Monsignor McClancy Memorial High School, and on the board of trustees of Memorial Sloan Kettering Cancer Center and The Valerie Fund.

He is a member of the Business Roundtable, where he is chair of the corporate governance committee. He is also currently a member of the American Society of Corporate Executives, the New York Jobs CEO Council, the New York Jobs CEO Council, and is on the board of trustees for the Paley Center for Media.

He has been a member of The Business Council, and previously served on the boards of The Guardian Life Insurance Company of America, NY Downtown Hospital, the Columbus Citizens Foundation, and J.Crew, the latter of which he joined in 2010.

== See also ==
- List of chief executive officers
- List of Manhattan University alumni

Business positions
Preceded by Kenneth Chenault	Chief Executive Officer of American Express; 2018 - present	Succeeded by Current
