= Nat Russo =

American author (born 1970)

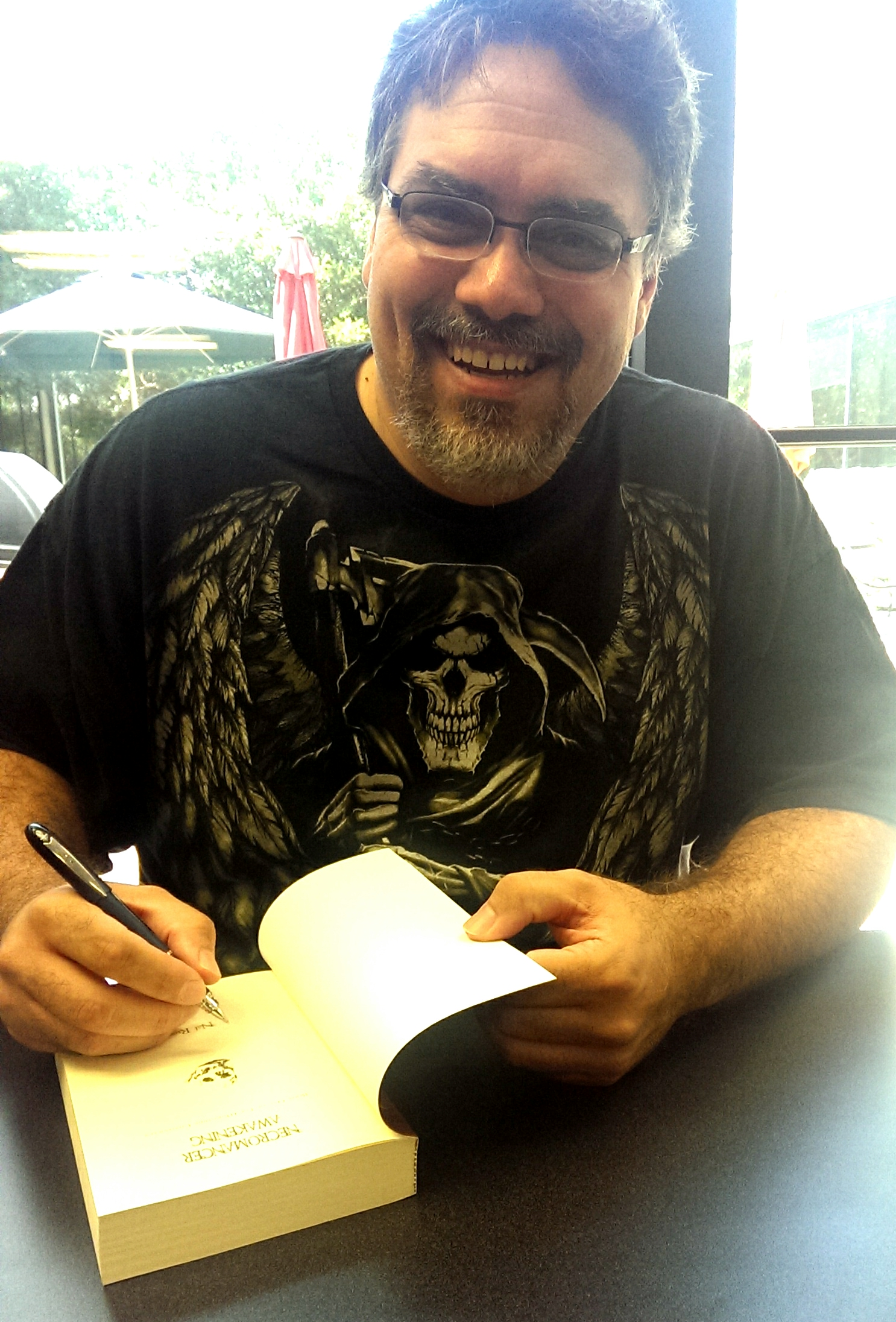
- Born: Natalo A. Russo; July 31, 1970 (age 56); New York City, U.S.
- Occupations: Author; blogger; software engineer
- Spouse: Casi Russo
- Children: 1
- Writing career
- Period: 2014–present
- Genres: Speculative fiction, Fantasy
- Notable works: Necromancer Awakening, The Road to Dar Rodon
- Website: erindorpress.com

Natalo A. Russo (born July 31, 1970) is an American fantasy fiction author. He is best known for his series The Mukhtaar Chronicles.

Russo also authors an award-winning blog for fellow writers, entitled A Writer's Journey, in which he documents his experiences as an independent writer and offers writing tips. Russo maintains an active presence on various social media outlets, including Facebook, Twitter, Pinterest, and LinkedIn.

== Biography ==
Natalo A. Russo was born in Queens, New York, raised in Prescott, Arizona, and as of 2015, lives in Austin, Texas.

According to his personal bio, he has held many jobs over the years before becoming an author, including pizza maker, radio DJ, Catholic seminarian, police officer, and software engineer, his current profession. He also holds a degree in Philosophy and a black belt in Tang Soo Do.

== Influences ==
Russo has stated on a number of occasions that his primary writing influence is Raymond E. Feist, author of the Riftwar Saga. Since the mid-1990s, Russo has maintained an online relationship with Feist.

He also credits fellow author and editor Joan Reginaldo, and James Scott Bell, for improving his craft as a writer.

== Bibliography ==
Necromancer Awakening, the first book of The Mukhtaar Chronicles, was published on April 9, 2014. On August 8, 2014, he released a follow-up prequel to Necromancer Awakening entitled The Road to Dar Rodon. A direct sequel to Necromancer Awakening, entitled Necromancer Falling, was published on May 29, 2016, in Kindle format.

=== Novels ===
The Mukhtaar Chronicles

Name	Published	ISBN	Notes
Necromancer Awakening	Erindor Press 2014	ISBN 978-0996005906	Paperback, Kindle
Necromancer Falling	Erindor Press 2016	ISBN 978-0996005920	Paperback, Kindle
Necromancer Ascending	Erindor Press Not Released	In Progress	In Progress

=== Novelettes ===
Tales of the Mukhtaar Lords

Name	Published	ISBN	Notes
The Road to Dar Rodon	Erindor Press 2014	ISBN 978-0996005913	Kindle
