= Nakia D. Johnson =

American writer

- Born: Bronx, New York, U.S.
- Education: Cardinal Spellman High School; Manhattan University
- Occupation: Writer
- Writing career
- Subject: African-American literature
- Notable work: Uptempo
- Website: www.nakiadjohnson.com

Nakia D. Johnson is an American writer who specializes in African-American literature. She is the author of the novel Uptempo (2009). An alum of Cardinal Spellman High School and Manhattan College, where she earned a Bachelor of Science in management, Johnson resides in New York City.
