= Kevin V. Mulcahy =

American political scientist (1945–2023)

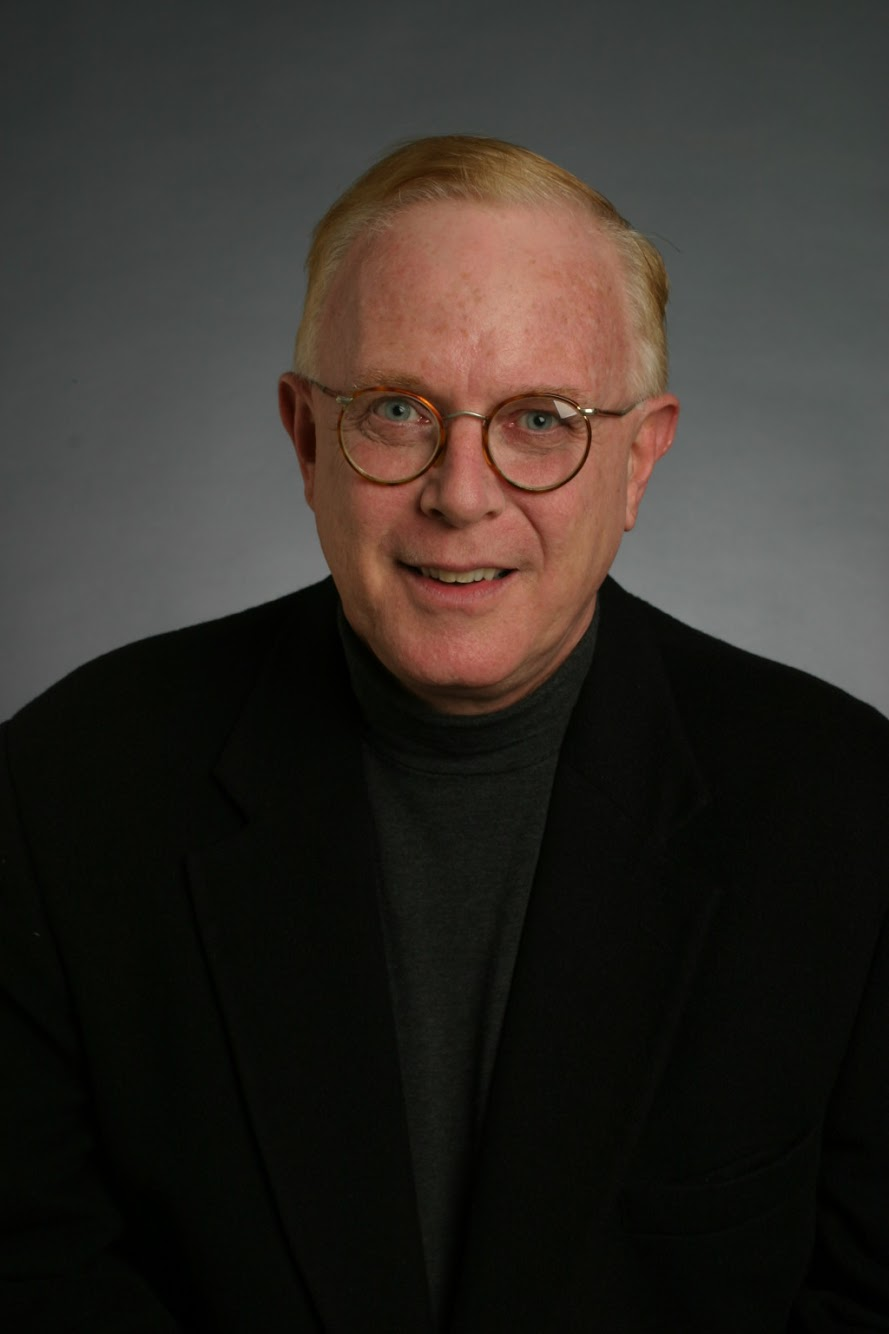
- Born: March 26, 1945; Rockland County, New York
- Died: July 1, 2023 (aged 78); Baton Rouge, Louisiana
- Education: Ph.D. (Public Policy 1977) Brown University
- Occupation: Endowed Professor Emeritus

Kevin Vincent Mulcahy (March 26, 1945 – July 1, 2023) was an American political scientist who was the Sheldon Beychok Distinguished Professor of Political Science Emeritus at Louisiana State University. He was on the faculty from 1980–2020.

== Background ==
Before joining the faculty at Louisiana State University in 1980, Mulcahy taught at University of Colorado (Visiting Lecturer, 1973), Queens College-CUNY (Instructor, 1973–1976), Mills College (Assistant Professor, 1976–1977), and Claremont McKenna College (Assistant Professor, 1977–1980). At Louisiana State University, Mulcahy was: Assistant Professor (1980–1985), Associate Professor (1985–1992), Professor (1992–2003), and Distinguished Professor (2003–2020).

== Scholarship ==
After early publications on American foreign policy coauthored with his senior colleague Cecil Crabb, Mulcahy developed the study of cultural politics within the general framework of public policy and administration. “Cultural policy is an area of public policy-making that governs activities related to the arts and culture. “His research focuses on a comparative analysis of cultural policies in international perspective including issues related to the identity of indigenous peoples and minorities. He critiques the heavily-privatized American system of cultural patronage and the impact of American cultural imperialism on other nations’ development.”

Mulcahy provides a “welcomed departure from approaches which understand the domain of ‘cultural policy’ as only those government documents or state-supported initiatives with an explicit cultural remit”. “As Kevin Mulcahy observed, cultural policy encompasses a much broader array of activities than were addressed under arts policy. The significance of the transformation of cultural policy can be observed in its demonstrable emphases on cultural identity, valorization of indigeneity and analyses of historical dynamics (such as hegemony and colonialism).”

He has published seven books and ninety articles/book chapters.

== Books ==
- America Votes, co-author with Richard S. Katz (Prentice- Hall, 1976)
- Public Policy and the Arts, co-editor with C. Richard Swaim (Westview Press, 1982)
- Presidents and Foreign Policy Making: FDR to Reagan, co-author with Cecil V. Crabb, Jr (Louisiana State University Press, 1986)
- The Challenge to Reform Arts Education, co-editor with David Pankratz (American Council for the Arts, 1989)
- American National Security: A Presidential Perspective, co-author with Cecil V. Crabb, Jr (Brooks/Cole, 1990)
- America’s Commitment to Culture: Government and the Arts, co-editor with Margaret J; Wyszomirski (Westview Press, 1995)
- Public Culture, Cultural Identity, Cultural Policy: Comparative Perspectives (Palgrave Macmillan, 2016); Chinese Edition with new Preface (Commercial Press, 2017).

== Notable Articles ==
Articles chosen based on readership and citations.

- “Cultural policy: Definitions and Theoretical Approaches”- The Journal of Arts Management, Law, and Society, 2006. (The Journal’s most read and cited article)
- “Cultural patronage in Comparative Perspective: Public Support for the Arts in France, Germany, Norway, and Canada”- The Journal of Arts Management, Law, and Society, 1998
- “The State Arts Agency: An Overview of Cultural Federalism in the United States”- The Journal of Arts Management, Law, and Society, 2002
- “Entrepreneurship or Cultural Darwinism? Privatization and American Cultural Patronage”- The Journal of Arts Management, Law, and Society, 2003
- “The Public Interest in Public Culture”- The Journal of Arts Management and Law, 1991
- “Cultural Imperialism and Cultural Sovereignty: US-Canadian Cultural Relations”- American Review of Canadian Studies, 2000
- “The Cultural Policy of the Counter‐ Reformation: The Case of St. Peter's Basilica”- International Journal of Cultural Policy, 2000
- “Hurricane Katrina: A Cultural Chernobyl”- The Journal of Arts Management, Law, and Society, 2008
- “Coloniality: The Cultural Policy of Post-Colonialism”- International Journal of Cultural Policy, 2016; revised version in Políticas Culturais em Revista, Universidade Federal da Bahia, 2019
- “Cajun Louisiana: Culture as a Way of Life”- The Journal of Arts Management, Law, and Society, 2019

== Educational Exchanges ==
=== Fulbright Activities ===
Fulbright Distinguished Professor of American Studies- The László Orszagh Chair Budapest University of Public Administration (2002–2003); Fulbright Senior Specialist, Babes-Bolyai University, Cluj-Napoca, Transylvania, Romania, (2019); Evaluator, Fulbright Senior Specialist Program, (2010–11); Evaluator, Romanian-American Fulbright Association, (2009–17)

=== Visiting Professor ===
Department of Government, Georgetown University, Washington D.C (1987); Ecole d’Etudes Anglophones, Université de Provence, Aix-en-Provence (1996–1997); Department of Arts Administration, Florida State University (2001); Chaire de Gestion des Arts, École des Hautes Études Commerciales de Montréal (2001); Department of Arts Administration, Columbia University (2005); Cultural Policy Program, Sun Yat-sen University, Kaohsiung, Taiwan (2006)

=== Lecturer ===
Arts Administration Program, University of Jyvaskyla, Finland (1998); Department of Art Studies, Peking University, Beijing, China (2002); University of Music and Dramatic Arts, Institut fur Kulturmanagement, Vienna, Austria (2002); Arts and Cultural Management Program, University of South Australia, Adelaide, Australia (2006); Lecturer, Cultural Management Program, Tshwane University of Technology, Pretoria, South Africa (2008); Institut d’Etudes Politiques, Université de Strasbourg (2011); Shenzhen University, Guangdong, China (2017); Institut d’Etudes Politiques de Grenoble (2019)

=== Scholar-In-Residence ===
Institute of Media Studies, University of Bergen, Norway (1996); Program in Arts Administration and Historic Preservation, University of Oregon, Eugene, Oregon (2002); Centre for Leisure Management Research, Deakin University, Melbourne, Australia (2006); Observatorio Politico, Lisbon, Portugal (2012); School of Political Studies, University of Ottawa, Canada (2017)

== Public Service ==
Arts Advisor, Speaker of the Louisiana House of Representatives. As a National Endowment for the Humanities, Humanist-in Residence at State Legislatures (1980–1983); Expert Witness, Presidential Commission on the Arts (1990) “Public Responsibility of a Public Arts Agency”; Panelist, Baton Rouge Council on the Arts and Humanities, (1981–1983, 1986–1987); Member, Admissions and Appropriations Committee, Baton Rouge Community Fund for the Arts (1991–1997); Member, Advisory Board, Baton Rouge Community School for the Arts (2000–2004); Chair, Baton Rouge City-Parish Committee on Art in Public Places (2000–2006); Member, Board of Directors, Greater Baton Rouge Council on the Arts (1999–2006).

== Professional Service ==
Executive Editor, Journal of Arts Management, Law, and Society (1997–2015), Executive Editor Emeritus (2015), Editorial Board Member (1990–2020); Convener/Organizer, 40th Annual Conference on Social Theory, Politics, and the Arts, Louisiana State University (2012); Member, Scientific Committee, Conference on Social Theory, Politics, and the Arts (2000–2020).

== Honors ==
Inaugural Lifetime Achievement Award, Conference on Social Theory Policies and the Arts, Montreal, Canada (2016).

Fellowship, National Endowment for the Humanities, Summer Seminar on French Politics and Society, Ecole d’Etudes Politiques de Paris, France (1991); Research Sabbatical, Award for Louisiana Artists and Scholars (ATLAS Award), Board of Regents (2007–2008); Louisiana House of Representatives Second Extraordinary Session, “ Special Commendation in Recognition of Service to Public Arts Programs,” (2001); Québec Studies Research Grants, Ministère des Affaires Internationales de Québec (1993,1994); Manship Research Fellowship (1998); "Who’s Who in Cultural Policy Research,” International Federation of Arts Councils and Cultural Agencies (2007); as well as five awards for teaching excellence.
