= Amy Lukavics =

American young adult horror author

- Born: United States
- Occupation: Novelist
- Children: 2
- Writing career
- Language: English
- Years active: 2015–present
- Genres: Young adult fiction, horror
- Notable works: Daughters Unto Devils, The Ravenous
- Website: www.amylukavics.com

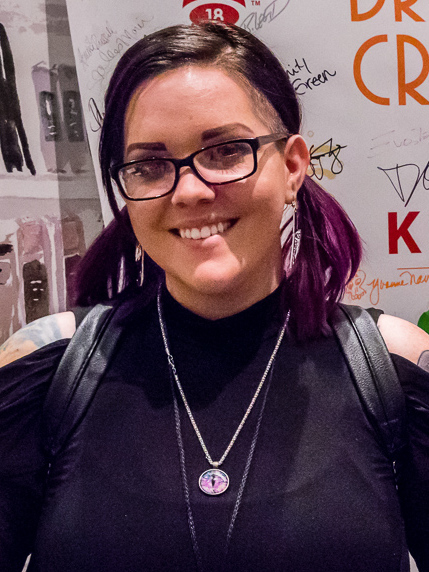
Amy Lukavics at the 2018 Phoenix Comic Fest

Amy Lukavics is an American author of young adult horror novels, best known for her debut novel Daughters Unto Devils and the Bram Stoker Award-nominated The Ravenous.

== Personal life ==
Lukavics was raised in Northern Arizona.

Lukavics says that she has always been intrigued by books and horror movies starting from a young age, but never considered becoming a writer because it seemed impossible to her. She especially loved the Scary Stories to Tell in the Dark series by Alvin Schwartz and the 1974 novel Carrie by Stephen King.

During middle school, she contemplated becoming an editor or a journalist for two months, but never tried to get the scholarships she would've needed in order to pursue a career path like that. She attended Prescott High School and graduated in 2006. After graduation, she worked as a dental assistant and as a front office medical assistant.

When she was 19, after she got let go from her medical assistant job, she first developed the idea of wanting to become a writer when sitting in a library. She started writing her first novel the next day. Lukavics never attended college, saying that she didn't feel passionately enough about any field to justify spending money on studying it.

She lives in Prescott, Arizona, with her husband and two children.

== Career ==
The first three books she wrote were dark contemporary novels that ended up never getting published. Lukavics didn't start writing horror until her fourth novel.

=== Daughters Unto Devils (2015) ===
Prior to publishing her first novel, Lukavics was offered to rewrite the fourth novel she ever wrote with an editor from a "big publishing house." Along the way, she realized that their creative visions differed, but went ahead with the revisions anyway, only to create a novel that wasn't up to either of their standards and ultimately was declined for publication. That same novel would later be rewritten and went on to sell to another publishing house, Harlequin Teen, which published it as Daughters Unto Devils in September 2015. It stars Amanda, a teen who finds herself pregnant during pioneer times while her family is searching for a new home in the prairie and settles on cursed land.

Lukavics says that the novel is "sort of Little House on the Prairie meets The Exorcist inspired." She originally wrote the Daughters Unto Devils with the intention of writing something set in the past, finding the idea of a pioneer horror story particularly intriguing, inspired by Stephen King's novella 1922, included in the Full Dark, No Stars novella collection.

In 2022, Daughters Unto Devils was listed among 52 books banned by the Alpine School District following the implementation of Utah law H.B. 374, “Sensitive Materials In Schools," 42% of which “feature LBGTQ+ characters and or themes.” Many of the books were removed because they were considered to contain pornographic material according to the new law, which defines porn using the following criteria:

- "The average person" would find that the material, on the whole, "appeals to prurient interest in sex"
- The material "is patently offensive in the description or depiction of nudity, sexual conduct, sexual excitement, sadomasochistic abuse, or excretion"
- The material, on the whole, "does not have serious literary, artistic, political or scientific value."

=== The Women in the Walls (2016) ===
Her second novel, The Women in the Walls, follows Lucy, a teen who suspects something strange is going on in her mansion home with her family after her mother dies, her aunt goes missing and her cousin claims she can hear voices coming from the walls. It was published by Harlequin Teen in October 2016.

=== The Ravenous (2017) ===
The Ravenous is about four sisters and their youngest sister, who dies in a car accident and gets resurrected by her mother, only to have developed cannibalistic tendencies. It was published by Harlequin Teen in September 2017. Lukavics describes The Ravenous as The Virgin Suicides meets Pet Sematary. It was nominated for the Bram Stoker Award for Best Young Adult Novel in 2018.

=== Nightingale (2018) ===
Her fourth young adult novel, Nightingale, is set in an asylum in 1951, telling the story of June, who finds herself held there against her will. It was published by Harlequin Teen in 2018.

=== Other works ===
She also wrote a horror short story called "The Feeding", about a monster creeping in the woods of a small town, available for free on Wattpad. Another one of her short stories was featured in issue six of Unnverving Magazine.
