= Dominic J. Monetta =

American scientist (1942–2021)

Dominic J. Monetta.
- Born: 1942; New York, New York
- Died: 2021 (aged 78–79)

Dominic J. Monetta, (born 1942, died 2021) was an American scientist. He served as the deputy director of Defense Research and Engineering (Research and Advanced Technology) from 1991 to 1993, acting as the de facto Chief Technology Officer for the United States Department of Defense.

== Education ==
Dr. Monetta received a B.S. in Chemical Engineering from Manhattan College, a M.S. in Engineering Administration (Operations research) from the George Washington University, and a Doctorate in Public Administration (R&D Management) from the University of Southern California.

== Career ==
=== Roles ===
Before his work at the Department of Defense, he had held the position of Director, Office of New Production Reactors, at the United States Department of Energy from 1989 to 1991, in addition to serving as the Technical Director and the Senior Executive at the Naval Ordnance Station, Indian Head, Maryland from 1986 to 1989. Dr. Monetta serves as the science and technology member of the Board of Hudson Technologies, Inc, The Center for Security Policy, The PAM Institute and the Nevada Test Site Historical Foundation.

== Research and activism ==
Throughout his career, he has been an early proponent advocating for development of alternative mobility fuels. Dr. Monetta worked extensively in operations pioneering new energy technology.

=== Nuclear energy ===
He was responsible for designing and building the new U.S. Tritium Production Reactors, which would have been the only and largest nuclear reactors to be built in the United States in the past three decades and the single largest construction project in the federal government at the time. An article in the Journal of Business and Behavioral Sciences credits Dr. Monetta with instituting a management style that “helped create a positive, competitive environment for sponsoring and encouraging innovation” to “jump-start tritium production while securing the future of American reactor design.”

=== Natural gas ===
Dr. Monetta's experience in the nuclear field was also applied to the Natural Gas industry, as his management concepts were instituted at the [Gas Research Institute] (GRI). A 1993 article shows that using this methodology, the GRI's Research and Development arm saw a “success rate of at least twice the [industry] norms” which allowed “increased gas availability at lower prices.” The R&D undertaken by GRI “led the way to a family of high-efficiency furnaces” as well as innovations in “development of technology to allow recovery of unconventional gas.”

=== Hydrogen technology ===
Dr. Monetta's interest in the innovation and development of alternative fuels has continued into the realm of hydrogen technology. In 2004, he delivered a presentation at the SMART TechTrends Conference where he summarized the US approach to Hydrogen technology and urged swift action:

“The problem for the U.S. is that waiting 25 years is not an option because the United States consumes more energy than any other country in the world…“Hydrogen represents an instant opportunity for capital expansion, growth, wealth accumulation and individual energy independence, security and prosperity.”

He recommended several policy changes to help grow the Hydrogen industry, suggesting that legislators:

“Provide short term items in the Department of Energy budget against a mid and long term R&D program plan. R&D is a critical element in the progression to the next level economy. The promise of the Hydrogen future rests in the ability of creative inventors to finagle meager dollars for advanced concepts, materials, storage and fuel.”

He championed an initiative to “change out the entire U.S. government fleet” from fossil fuel to hydrogen vehicles. He encouraged promoting “the “personal perk” exemption from HOV restrictions for Hydrogen fuel vehicles”, which the Commonwealth of Virginia did in 2006, and again by extending the law in 2011. Dr. Monetta implored legislators to establish “a 50% tax credit for anything Hydrogen (production, storage, transportation, consumption), allowing Hydrogen to be special and competitive with gasoline.”
