= Dick Tuckey =

American football player (1913–1974)

- Dick Tucky in 1939

No. 42
- Positions: Fullback, halfback

Personal information
- Born: September 29, 1913; Naugatuck, Connecticut, U.S.
- Died: December 25, 1974 (age 61); West Haven, Connecticut

Career information
- College: Manhattan

Career history
- 1938: Cleveland Rams
- 1938: Washington Redskins

Richard James Kenneth Tuckey, Jr. (September 29, 1913 – December 1974) was an American football player. He played on both offense and defense, mostly at the fullback and halfback positions.

Tuckey was born in 1913 in Naugatuck, Connecticut. He attended Naugatuck High School and the Dean Academy in Franklin, Massachusetts. He then enrolled at Manhattan College where he played college football at the fullback position for the Manhattan Jaspers from 1934 to 1936.

He began his professional football career in the National Football League (NFL) with the 1938 Washington Redskins. Prior to the start of the 1938 season, Bill Dismer Jr. of The Sunday Star wrote:

Although Karamatic stil holds the edge in open-field running, he has yet to show that he can match Tuckey's ability at breaking through the line a la Cliff Battles. Because he can also pass -- and is improving daily under the tutelage of Baugh -- Tuckey's presence would give the Skins as versatile and deceptive a backfield as they had last season. Tuckey, Baugh and Riley Smith give the Skins three expert passers; all three can kick and Baugh and Tuckey are valuable ball carriers."

Tuckey appeared in three games for the Redskins.

Tuckey was sold by the Redskins to the Cleveland Rams on October 5, 1938. He appeared in four games with the Rams. He was a triple-threat player who could pass, run, and kick, and was the last of the dropkickers in the NFL. He was placed on waivers by the Rams on November 15, 1938.

After his release by the Rams, Tuckey signed in December 1938 with the Danbury Trojans of the American Association. He played for Danbury in 1938 and 1939. He also played for the Long Island Indians of the American Association in 1940 and 1941. During World War II, he served in the United States Navy. After the war, he played Canadian football in the Ontario Rugby Football Union for the Toronto Balmy Beach Beachers (1947).

Tuckey died in 1974 in West Haven, Connecticut.
