= Ashton Pankey =

American basketball player (born 1992)

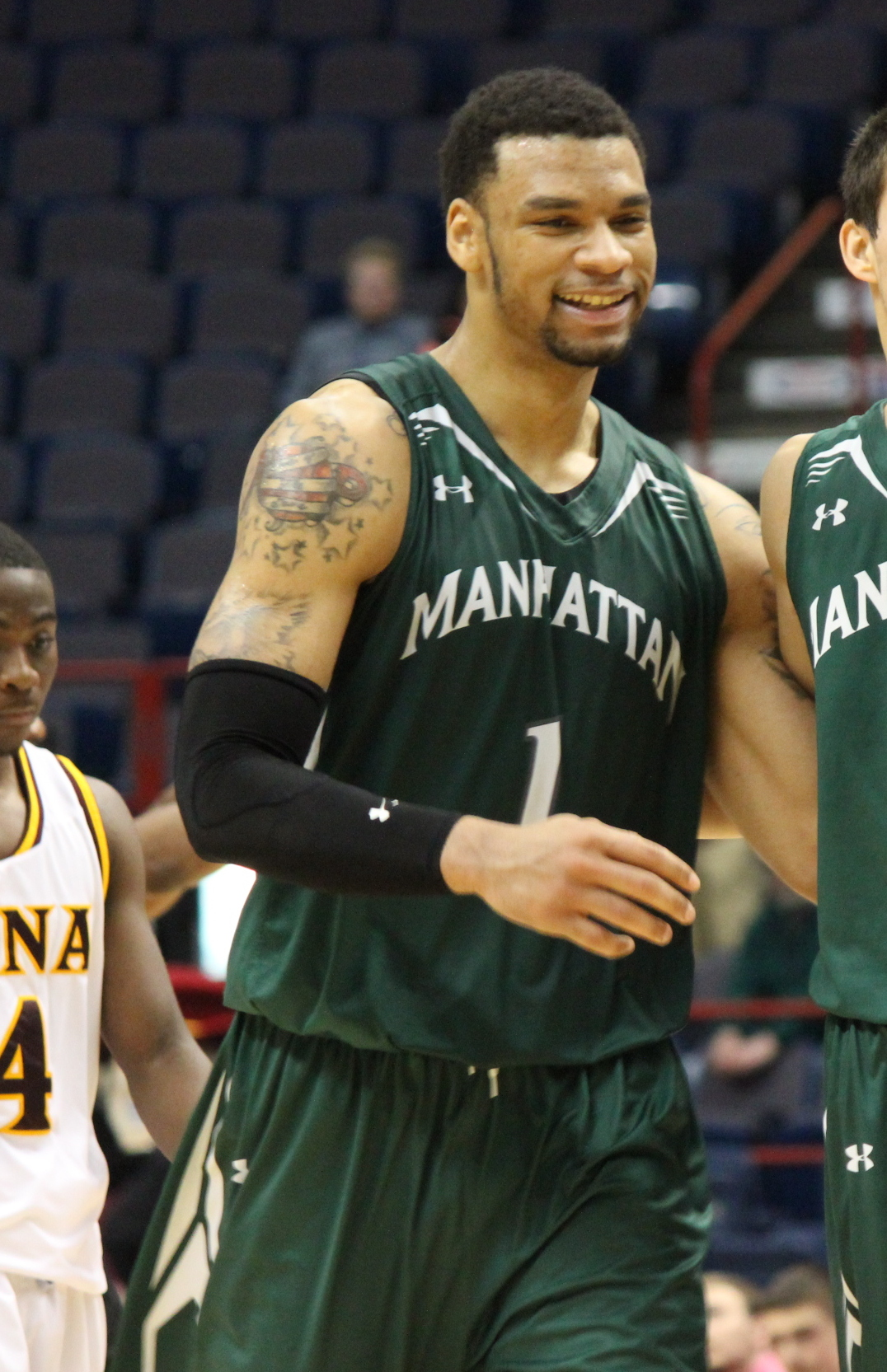

Free agent
- Position: Power forward

Personal information
- Born: May 16, 1992 (age 34)
- Listed height: 6 ft 10 in (2.08 m)
- Listed weight: 225 lb (102 kg)

Career information
- High school: St. Anthony (Jersey City, New Jersey)
- College: Maryland (2010–2012); Manhattan (2013–2015)
- NBA draft: 2015: undrafted
- Playing career: 2015–present

Career history
- 2015–2016: Hapoel Galil Elyon

Career highlights
- Third-team All-MAAC (2015); MAAC tournament MVP (2015)

Ashton Pankey (born May 16, 1992) is an American basketball player who last played for Hapoel Galil Elyon of the Liga Leumit. He was an early entrant for the 2015 NBA draft.

Pankey attended Archbishop Molloy High School before transferring to St. Anthony High School.

== College career ==
In 2012 Pankey transferred to Manhattan College. He transferred from the Maryland Terrapins. Pankey was the MAAC men's basketball tournament Most Valuable Player for the 2015 tournament. As a senior, Pankey averaged 13.4 points and 6.7 rebounds per game.

== Professional career ==
In September 2015, Pankey signed with Hapoel Galil Elyon in Israel.

== Personal life ==
In 2012 Pankey stated that he left University of Maryland because he wanted to aid his family.
