= Judith West (businesswoman) =

Judith West (or Judith West Edelman) is an entrepreneur businesswoman, political activist and radio personality who hosts her own cable network TV Show, Getting Your Money's Worth.

Owner and president of Westco Inc., based in New York City. West founded her own privately held company, Westco which designs and manufactures retail store fixtures.

== Education ==
She received a Bachelor of Science Degree in Economics from Hunter College. She then earned a Master of Arts degree in career counseling from Manhattan College in New York.
