= Mollie Monroe =

American pioneer (1846–1902)

Mary E. Sawyer (c. 1846–1902), better known as Mollie Monroe, was an American old west woman known for crossdressing and for liaisons with multiple men.

== Early life ==
Monroe fell in love with a man as a teenager. Both her family and her boyfriend's family agreed that the couple was too young to marry, and the man was sent away. Sawyer then decided to go after her boyfriend, disguised as a man and calling herself Sam Brewer. Her search ended in sadness, when she discovered her boyfriend had been murdered by a gang during a bar brawl. Monroe swore to avenge his death, crossing virtually every city from Utah to northern Mexico. She failed to find the killers, and became an alcoholic.

== Marriage ==
Around 1870, she met George Monroe, a well-known, rich miner. Sawyer and George Monroe married and settled in Wickenburg, Arizona, where they mined together. In 1874, they moved to Prescott, Arizona. George Monroe had discovered a water spring there. He turned it into a resort and named it "Monroe Springs". The attraction drew tourists from around the country.

Mollie Monroe was also a gambler. Apart from her alcoholism, her gambling addiction led her to lose a considerable amount of money, once selling a gold mine she had discovered for around $2,500 dollars, then gambling the money away in about a week.

Monroe enjoyed helping needy people, such as prostitutes, lone women and their children. Legend tells that once she met a woman and her children; having been told by the woman that her husband went to town for supplies three days before and had not returned, she went searching for the man, and found him in a bar. She enticed him out of the bar, tied him to her horse and dragged him all the way back to his house, staying overnight to make sure he would not leave again.

A newspaper report told of her saving the lives of 20 army men who were attacked by Apaches. According to the article, she had left the men to look for food, and when she returned, the men were surrounded by Apache, and two had been killed. She and her friend Texas Johnson fired shots into the air, and the Apaches ran, according to the news.

Monroe was despised by most of Prescott's high society women, for what they viewed as "manly manners" and, as a popular publication of the time said, "morals that are dissolute".

In 1877, she was found wandering the streets of Peeples Valley. Brought to trial, she was found to be insane on May 9 and sent to a sanitarium in Stockton, California. On the way to Stockton under arrest, she was attacked by thieves. Other than losing a watch and some 450 dollars, Monroe came out unscathed from the attack. Monroe's times at the California asylum were not without controversy: she tried to burn the building down, which sent her to San Quentin. Once there, she forged a friendship with former Arizona governor A.P.K. Safford (after whom the city of Safford, Arizona is named).

In 1887, she was sent to a new asylum in Phoenix. In 1895, she escaped, but was found four days later. She was found bleeding and in poor health. Her health, troubled by her alcohol problems, continued to decline, and in 1902, she died in the Phoenix asylum.
