= Charlotte Hornets all-time roster =

The Charlotte Hornets are an American professional basketball team based in Charlotte, North Carolina. They play in the Southeast Division of the Eastern Conference in the National Basketball Association (NBA). The Hornets were first established in 1988 as an expansion team, but relocated to New Orleans following the 2001–02 season. In 2004, a new expansion team, the Charlotte Bobcats, was established. After 10 seasons as the Bobcats, the team changed its name to the Charlotte Hornets for the 2014–15 season, a year after the New Orleans franchise relinquished the Hornets name and renamed itself the Pelicans. In addition to re-inheriting the Hornets name from New Orleans, the Charlotte franchise reclaimed the history and records of the original 1988–2002 Hornets, effectively becoming a continuation of the original franchise.

The Hornets have played their home games at the Spectrum Center, formerly known as the Charlotte Bobcats Arena and the Time Warner Cable Arena, since 2005. Their principal owners are Gabe Plotkin and Rick Schnall, with Eric Church, J. Cole, and Michael Jordan holding minority interests. Charles Lee has been the Hornets' head coach since 2024.

As of the end of the 2025–26 season, there have been 325 past and current players who have appeared in at least one game for the Hornets franchise. Robert Parish, Vlade Divac, Alonzo Mourning, Tony Parker, and Dwight Howard are the only Hornets to have been inducted into the Basketball Hall of Fame. Mourning, Larry Johnson, Glen Rice, Eddie Jones, Baron Davis, Gerald Wallace, Kemba Walker, and LaMelo Ball are the only Hornets selected to play in an All-Star Game. Fifteen players have received rookie-related honors. Johnson (1991–92), Emeka Okafor (2004–05), and LaMelo Ball (2020–21) have been named Rookie of the Year. Six Hornets have been selected to the All-Rookie First Team: Kendall Gill (1990–91), Johnson (1991–92), Mourning (1992–93), Okafor (2004–05), Ball (2020–21), and Brandon Miller (2023–24). Nine Hornets have been selected to the All-Rookie Second Team: Rex Chapman (1988–89), J. R. Reid (1989–90), Raymond Felton (2005–06), Adam Morrison and Wálter Herrmann (2006–07), D. J. Augustin (2008–09), Michael Kidd-Gilchrist (2012–13), Cody Zeller (2013–14), and P. J. Washington (2019–20). George Zidek, drafted in 1995, was the first foreign-born player to be selected by the Hornets. Kemba Walker is the franchise's all-time leading scorer with 12,009 points, the only player to score more than 10,000 with the franchise. Okafor leads all players in rebounds with 3,516, and Muggsy Bogues leads all players in assists with 5,557.

== Players ==
†		Denotes players who joined the Hornets through the 1988 expansion draft			
*		Denotes players who joined the Hornets (originally Bobcats) through the 2004 expansion draft			
^		Denotes players who are currently on the Hornets roster			
No		Jersey number	Pos	Position	
G	Guard	F	Forward	C	Center
Pts	Points	Reb	Rebounds	Ast	Assists

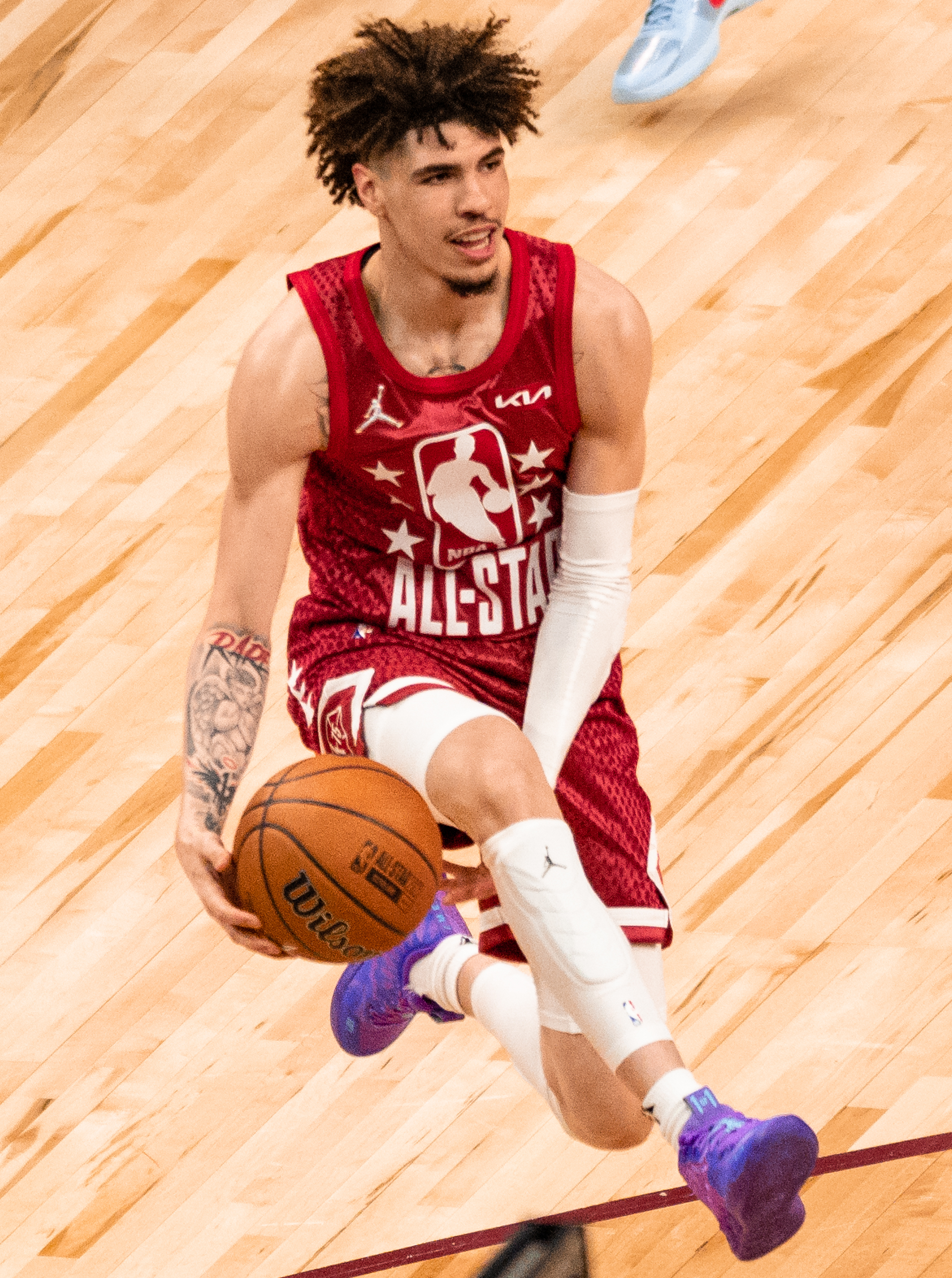
LaMelo Ball won Rookie of the Year honors in 2021, received an all-star selection in 2022, and is the Hornets' all-time leader in triple-doubles.

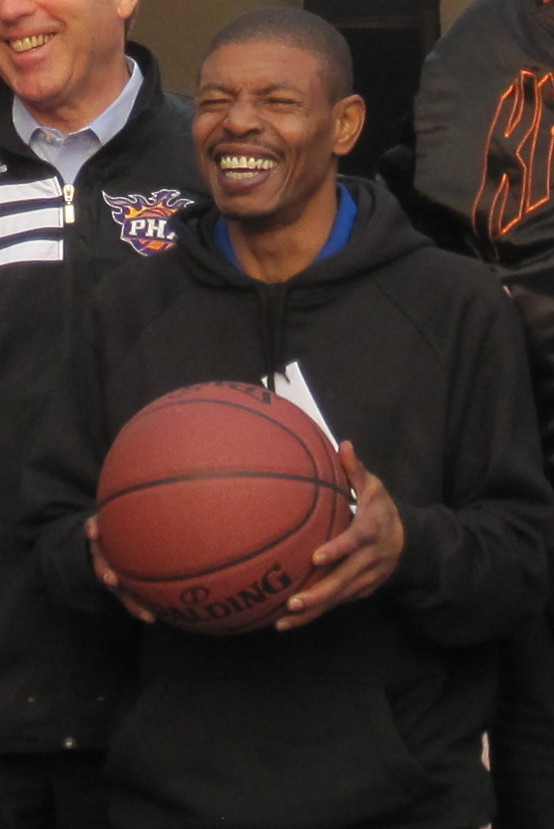
Muggsy Bogues, the shortest player in NBA history at 5 ft 3 in (1.60 m), is the Hornets' all-time leader in both assists and steals.

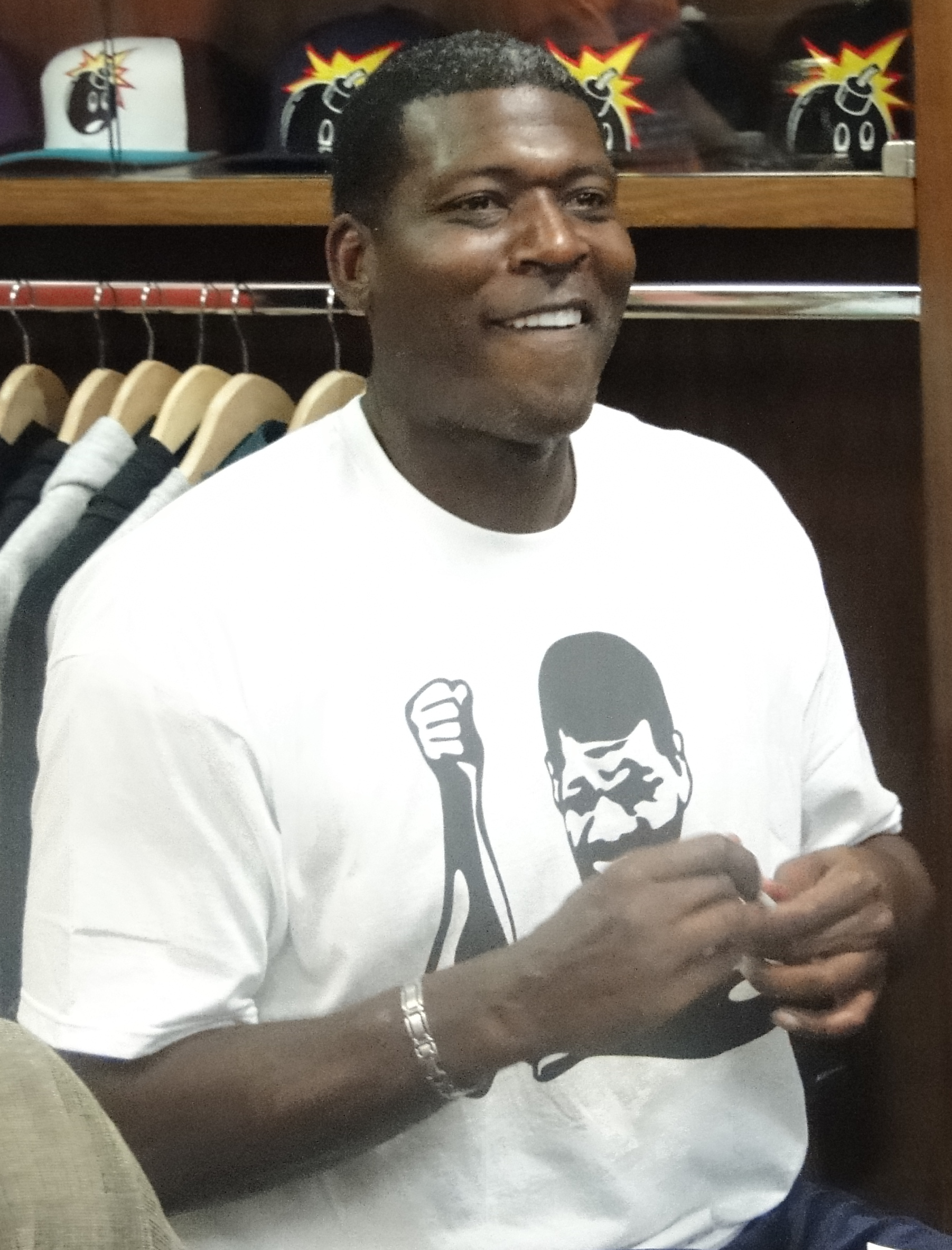
Larry Johnson won Rookie of the Year honors in 1992 and received two all-star selections as a Hornet.

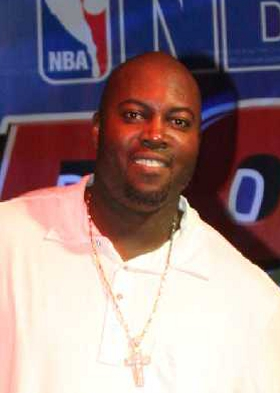
Glen Rice won the 1997 NBA All-Star Game MVP and received three all-star selections in his three years with the Hornets.

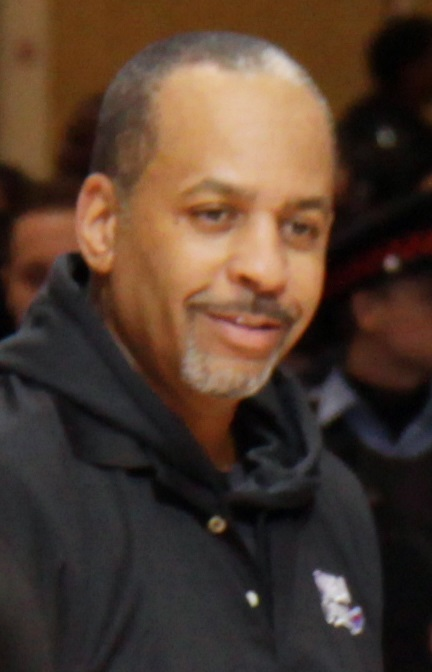
Dell Curry is the all-time games played leader for the Hornets with 701.

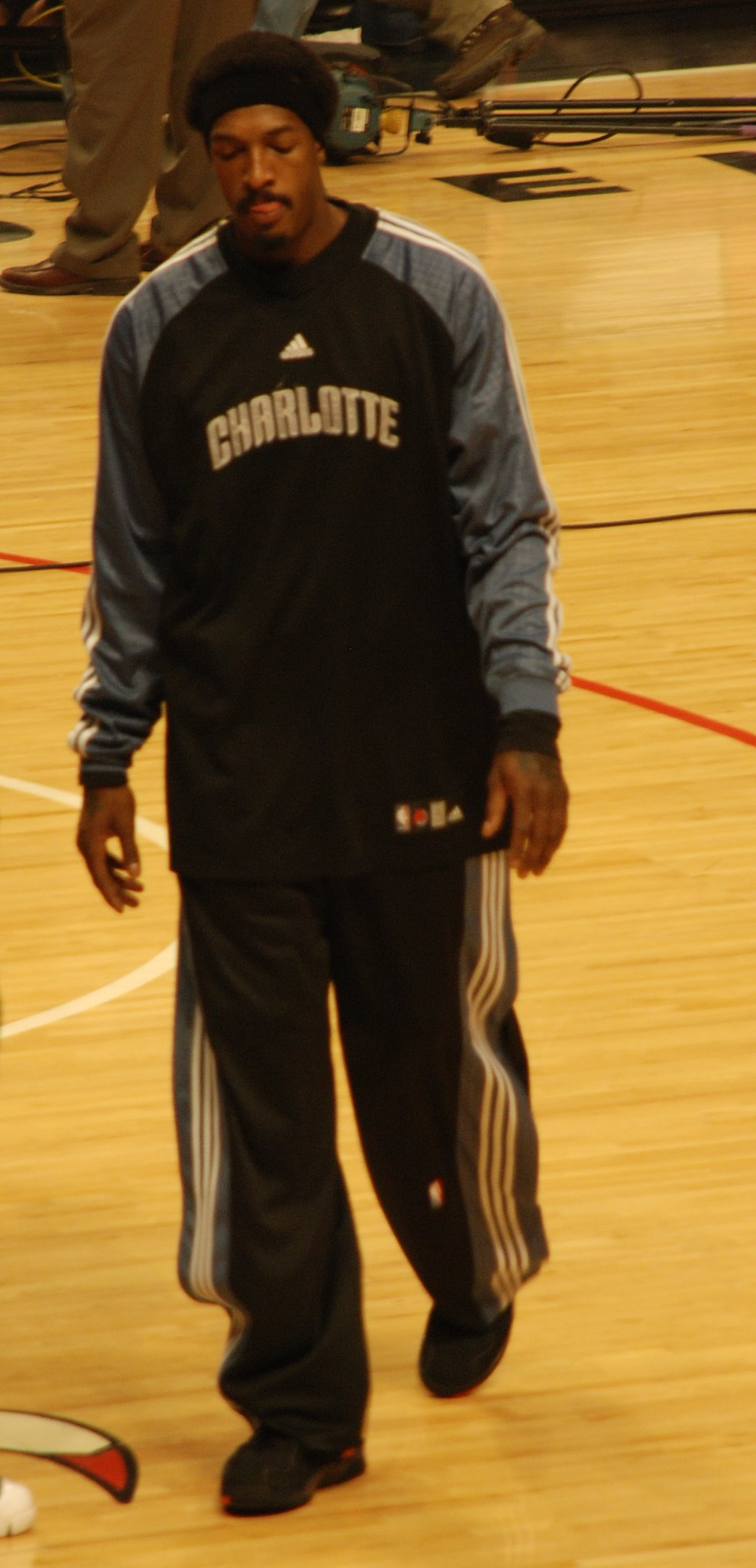
Gerald Wallace is one of eight Hornets players to be selected as NBA All-Stars.

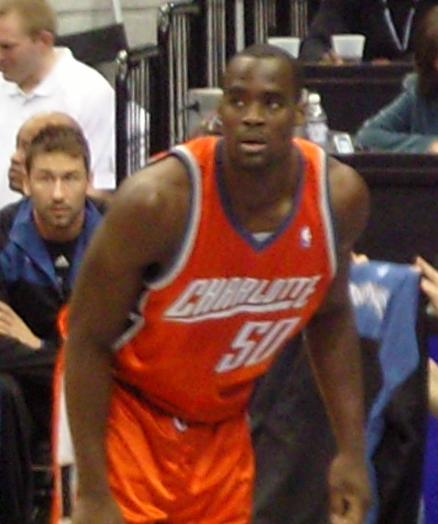
Emeka Okafor won Rookie of the Year honors in 2005 with the Hornets.

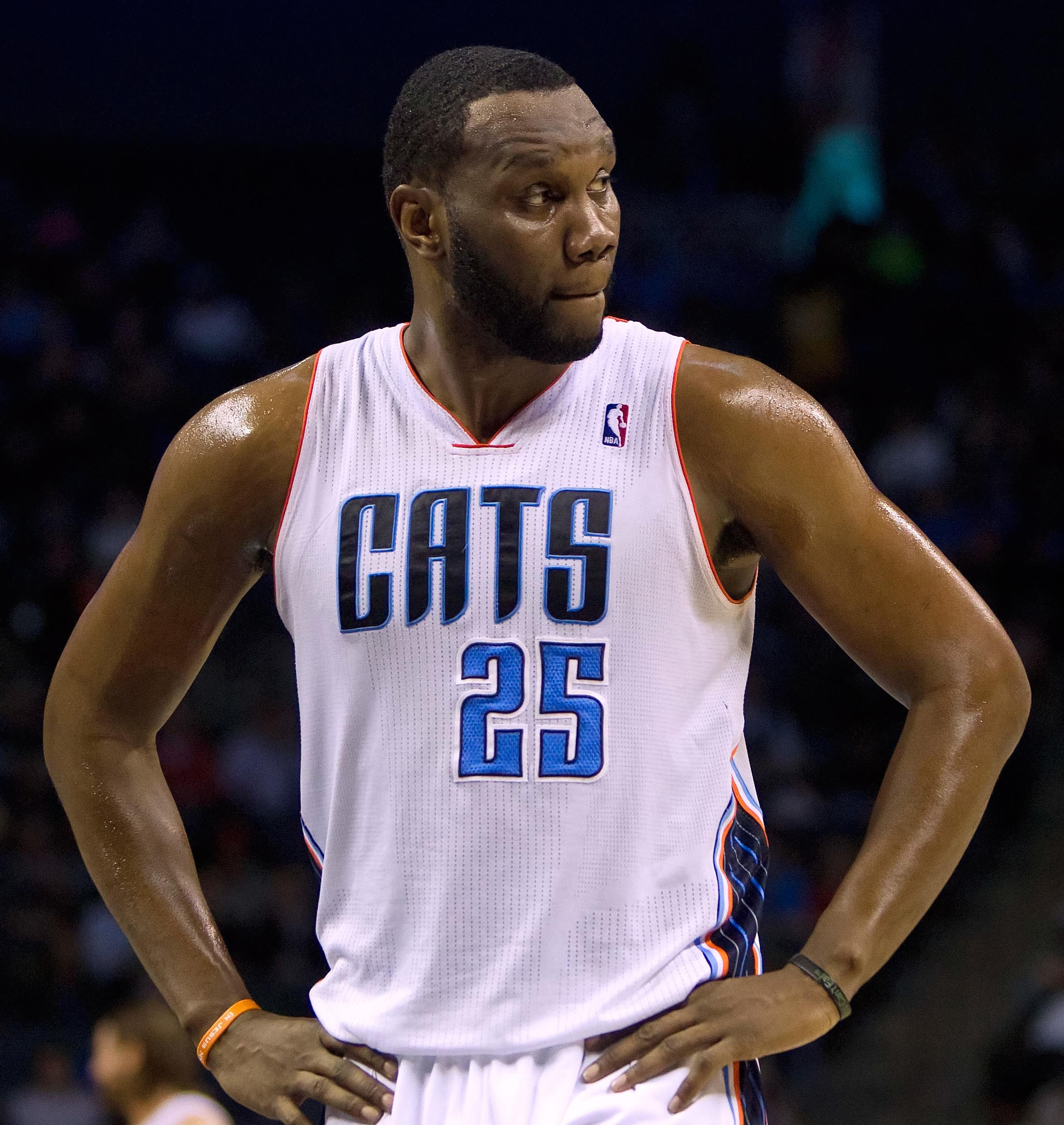
Al Jefferson was selected to the All-NBA Third Team in 2014.

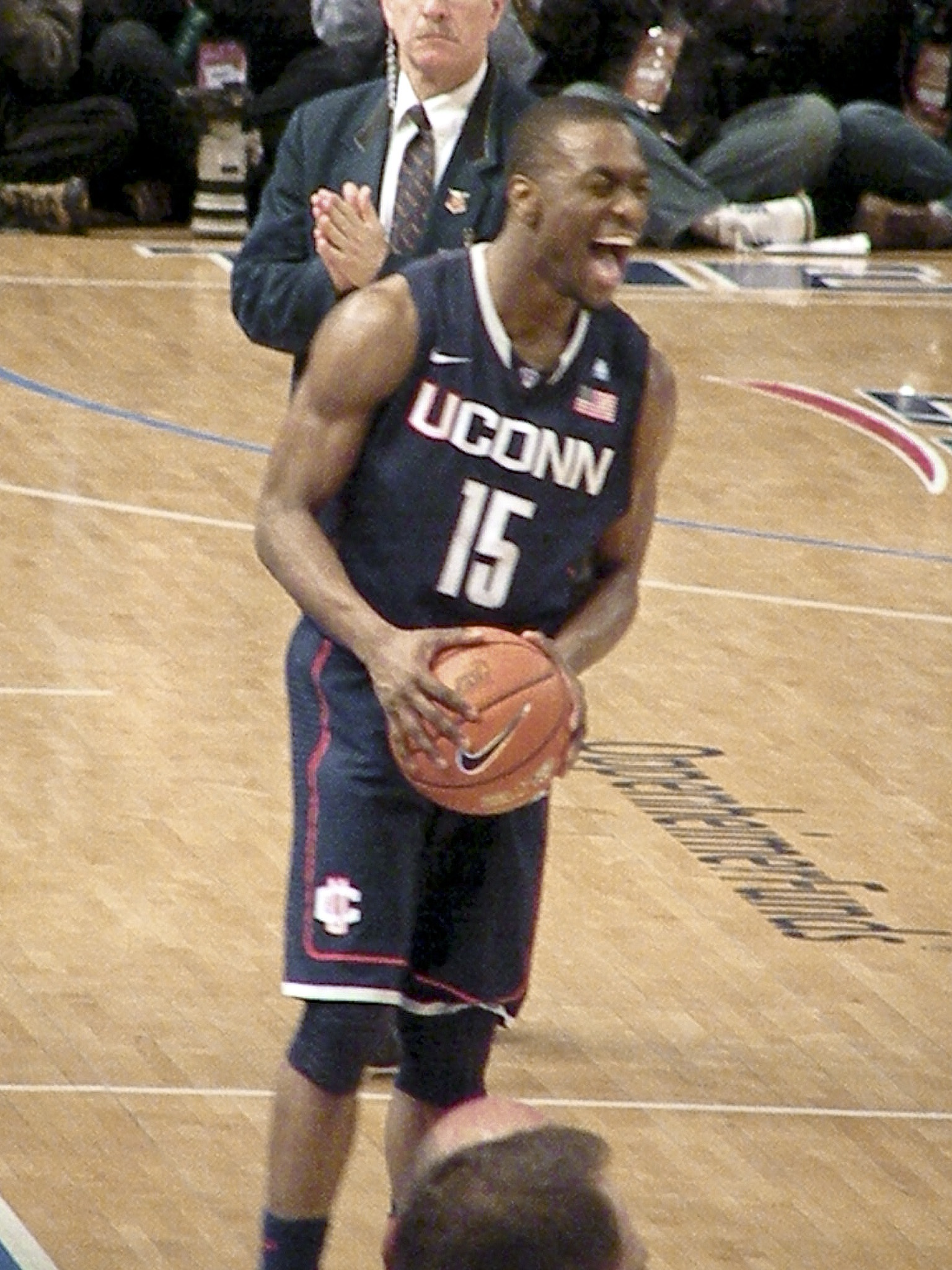
Kemba Walker is the Hornets' all-time leader in points with 12,009.

Player	Nationality	No^{[a]}	Pos^{[a]}	From	To	School/club	Pts^{[b]}	Reb^{[b]}	Ast^{[b]}	Ref
Michael Adams	United States	23	G	1994	1996	Boston College	302	51	162	
Rafael Addison	United States	7	F	1995	1997	Syracuse	299	135	64	
Jeff Adrien	United States	4	F	2012	2014	Connecticut	266	284	43	
Alexis Ajinça	France	21	C	2008	2010	Hyères-Toulon (France)	80	34	3	
Cory Alexander	United States	12	G	2005	2005	Virginia	49	29	37	
Malik Allen	United States	35	F	2005	2005	Villanova	111	47	7	
Alan Anderson	United States	15	G/F	2005	2007	Michigan State	305	102	53	
Derek Anderson	United States	1; 23	G	2006	2008	Kentucky	540	165	177	
Kenny Anderson	United States	12	G	1996	1996	Georgia Tech	577	102	328	
Richard Anderson	United States	35	F/C	1989	1990	UC–Santa Barbara	231	127	55	
Michael Ansley	United States	54	F	1992	1992	Alabama	6	2	0	
B. J. Armstrong	United States	10	G	1997	1999	Iowa	301	85	171	
Stacey Augmon	United States	2	G/F	2001	2002	UNLV	357	225	103	
D. J. Augustin	United States	14	G	2008	2012	Texas	3,068	564	1,248	
Dwayne Bacon	United States	7	G	2017	2020	Florida State	170	313	137	
Amari Bailey	United States	10	G	2023	2024	UCLA	23	9	7	
LaMelo Ball^	United States	1; 2	G	2020	present	Chino Hills	6,304	1,726	2,224	
Nicolas Batum	France	5	F	2015	2020	Le Mans (France)	3,728	1,705	1,521	
Damion Baugh	United States	7	G	2024	2025	TCU	109	50	56	
Lonny Baxter*	United States	35	F	2006	2006	Maryland	36	33	2	
Corey Beck	United States	14; 15	G	1995; 1997	1996; 1999	Arkansas	231	120	123	
Marco Belinelli	Italy	21	G/F	2016	2017	Fortitudo Bologna (Italy)	780	178	147	
Raja Bell	U.S. Virgin Islands	19	G	2009	2010	FIU	647	200	123	
Tony Bennett	United States	25	G	1992	1995	UW–Green Bay	538	155	303	
Dāvis Bertāns	Latvia	9	F	2024	2024	Olimpija Ljubljana (Slovenia)	246	51	26	
Bismack Biyombo	Democratic Republic of the Congo	0; 8	C	2012	2021	Baloncesto Fuenlabrada (Spain)	2,199	2,625	250	
Leaky Black	United States	12	F	2023	2024	North Carolina	69	48	24	
James Blackwell	United States	7	G	1994	1994	Dartmouth	4	3	5	
Keith Bogans	United States	10	G/F	2004	2006	Kentucky	1,055	332	180	
Muggsy Bogues†	United States	1	G	1988	1997	Wake Forest	5,531	1,840	5,557	
Marques Bolden	United States	3	C	2024	2024	Duke	37	32	4	
James Bouknight	United States	5	G	2021	2024	UConn	383	133	73	
Earl Boykins	United States	11	G	2008	2008	Eastern Michigan	185	34	96	
Primož Brezec*	Slovenia	7	C	2004	2008	Union Olimpija (Slovenia)	2,245	1,199	160	
Frank Brickowski	United States	40	C/F	1994	1994	Penn State	282	125	57	
Miles Bridges^	United States	0	F	2018	present	Michigan State	7,956	3,077	1,381	
Andre Brown	United States	1	F	2008	2008	DePaul	4	12	1	
Chucky Brown	United States	52	F	2000	2000	North Carolina State	551	264	82	
Derrick Brown	United States	4	F	2009	2011	Xavier	861	398	115	
Kwame Brown	United States	54	F	2010	2011	Glynn Academy (GA)	524	450	43	
P. J. Brown	United States	42	C	2000	2002	Louisiana Tech	1,345	1,528	234	
Shannon Brown	United States	12	G	2008	2009	Michigan State	144	24	28	
Matt Bullard	United States	50	F	2001	2002	Iowa	105	47	16	
Kevin Burleson	United States	12	G	2005	2006	Minnesota	70	26	48	
Scott Burrell	United States	24; 2	F	1993; 2001	1997; 2001	Connecticut	1,425	680	310	
Willie Burton	United States	9	F	1999	1999	Minnesota	4	6	0	
Elden Campbell	United States	41; 5	C/F	1999	2002	Clemson	3,573	2,029	396	
Vernon Carey Jr.	United States	22	C	2020	2022	Duke	54	32	2	
Matt Carroll	United States	13; 33	G	2005; 2010	2009; 2012	Notre Dame	2,923	831	302	
Michael Carter-Williams	United States	10	G	2017	2018	Syracuse	239	138	116	
Tom Chambers	United States	22	F	1997	1997	Utah	19	14	4	
Tyson Chandler	United States	6	C	2009	2010	Dominguez High School (CA)	333	320	16	
Rex Chapman	United States	3	G	1988	1992	Kentucky	3,574	611	644	
Joe Chealey	United States	31	G	2019	2020	College of Charleston	4	0	2	
Derrick Coleman	United States	44	F/C	1999	2001	Syracuse	2,002	1,144	292	
Sherron Collins	United States	11	G	2010	2011	Kansas	17	5	8	
Marty Conlon	Republic of Ireland; United States	7	C	1994	1994	Providence	163	89	28	
Pat Connaughton^	United States	21	G	2025	present	Notre Dame	110	61	18	
Dante Cunningham	United States	44	F	2011	2011	Villanova	198	88	13	
Earl Cureton	United States	25	C/F	1988; 1990	1989; 1991	Detroit Mercy	549	524	133	
Dell Curry†	United States	30	G	1988	1998	Virginia Tech	9,839	2,022	1,429	
Seth Curry	United States	30	G	2024	2025	Duke	516	129	74	
Troy Daniels	United States	30	G	2015	2016	Virginia Commonwealth	319	65	26	
Nate Darling	Canada	30	G	2021	2021	Delaware	1	1	1	
Jermareo Davidson	United States	33	F/C	2007	2008	Alabama	120	62	13	
Baron Davis	United States	1	G	1999	2002	UCLA	3,101	922	1,605	
Ricky Davis	United States	21	G/F	1999	2000	Iowa	436	167	120	
Tony Delk	United States	00	G	1996	1997	Kentucky	340	101	102	
Moussa Diabaté^	France	14	C	2024	present	Michigan	978	1,073	197	
Boris Diaw	France	32	F/C	2008	2012	ÉB Pau-Orthez (France)	3,010	1,381	1,107	
DeSagana Diop	Senegal	7; 2	C	2009	2014	Oak Hill Academy (VA)	213	396	67	
Vlade Divac	Serbia	12	C	1996	1998	KK Partizan (Yugoslavia)	1,691	1,243	473	
Chris Douglas-Roberts	United States	55	F	2013	2014	Memphis	339	119	51	
Terry Dozier	United States	23	F	1989	1989	South Carolina	22	15	3	
Bryce Drew	United States	17	G	2001	2002	Valparaíso	210	72	101	
Jared Dudley	United States	4	F	2007	2008	Boston College	530	345	100	
Dale Ellis	United States	2	F/G	2000	2000	Tennessee	55	22	8	
LeRon Ellis	United States	43	C	1993	1994	Syracuse	221	188	24	
Melvin Ely	United States	2	F	2004	2007	Fresno State	1,206	642	166	
Tony Farmer	United States	8	F/C	1997	1998	Nebraska	67	32	5	
Jamie Feick	United States	50	F/C	1997	1997	Michigan State	5	3	0	
Raymond Felton	United States	20	G	2005	2010	North Carolina	5,311	1,366	2,573	
Malachi Flynn	United States	22	G	2025	2025	San Diego State	16	7	7	
Anthony Frederick	United States	24	F	1991	1992	Pepperdine	389	144	71	
Todd Fuller	United States	52	C	1999	2000	North Carolina State	134	110	5	
Marcus Garrett	United States	28	G	2025	2025	Kansas	28	6	13	
Kenny Gattison	United States	33; 44	F	1989	1995	Old Dominion	3,289	1,942	394	
Matt Geiger	United States	52	C	1995	1998	Georgia Tech	2,188	1,428	176	
Taj Gibson	United States	67	F/C	2024	2025	USC	107	120	21	
Kendall Gill	United States	13	G/F	1990; 1995	1993; 1996	Illinois	4,159	1,194	1,125	
Armen Gilliam	United States	45	F	1989	1991	UNLV	4,159	1,194	1,125	
Gerald Glass	United States	35	F	1996	1996	Mississippi	5	2	0	
Mike Gminski	United States	42	C	1991	1994	Duke	940	643	109	
Anthony Goldwire	United States	5	G	1996	1997	Houston	421	81	206	
Ben Gordon	United Kingdom; United States	8	G	2012	2014	Connecticut	939	157	162	
Devonte' Graham	United States	4	G	2018	2021	Kansas	2,178	541	1,098	
Stephen Graham	United States	23	G/F	2009	2010	Oklahoma State	296	135	23	
Treveon Graham	United States	12	G/F	2016	2018	Virginia Commonwealth	330	143	65	
Ronnie Grandison	United States	31	F	1992	1992	New Orleans	10	11	1	
Greg Grant	United States	5	G	1991	1991	TCNJ	1	4	18	
Stuart Gray	Panama; United States	55	C	1989	1990	UCLA	101	131	17	
Jeff Grayer	United States	20	G/F	1998	1998	Iowa State	0	0	1	
Josh Green^	Australia	10	G	2024	present	Arizona	755	274	155	
Rickey Green†	United States	14	G	1988	1989	Michigan	128	23	82	
Sidney Green	United States	21	F/C	1992	1993	UNLV	40	47	5	
Jorge Gutiérrez	Mexico	12	G	2016	2016	California	22	7	17	
Scott Haffner	United States	4	G	1991	1991	Evansville	17	4	9	
P. J. Hairston	United States	19	G/F	2014	2016	North Carolina	540	220	50	
PJ Hall^	United States	16	C	2025	present	Clemson	73	66	8	
Justin Hamilton	United States	41	C	2014	2014	Louisiana State	0	0	0	
Tom Hammonds	United States	20	F	1992	1993	Georgia Tech	43	31	8	
Darrin Hancock	United States	4	F	1994	1996	Kansas	425	151	77	
Tyler Hansbrough	United States	50	F	2015	2016	North Carolina	104	89	8	
Montrezl Harrell	United States	8	F/C	2022	2022	Louisville	47	22	5	
Othella Harrington	United States	24	F/C	2006	2008	Georgetown	113	80	10	
Aaron Harrison	United States	9	G	2015	2017	Kentucky	19	18	5	
Jason Hart	United States	1	G	2004	2005	Syracuse	706	203	367	
Kirk Haston	United States	35	F	2001	2002	Indiana	26	20	5	
Spencer Hawes	United States	0; 00	C	2015	2017	Washington	594	390	171	
Hersey Hawkins	United States	3; 33	G	1993; 2000	1995; 2001	Bradley	2,535	771	550	
Michael Hawkins	United States	7	G	1999	2000	Xavier	8	7	13	
Gordon Hayward	United States	20	F	2020	2024	Butler	2,736	814	680	
Brendan Haywood	United States	33	C	2012	2013	North Carolina	216	290	29	
Gerald Henderson	United States	15; 9	G	2009	2015	Duke	4,701	1,320	822	
Steve Henson	United States	12	G	1993	1993	Kansas State	3	1	5	
Willy Hernangómez	Spain	9; 41	C	2017	2020	Real Madrid (Spain)	162	561	101	
Wálter Herrmann	Argentina	5	F	2006	2007	Unicaja Málaga (Spain)	510	175	30	
Roy Hibbert	Jamaica; United States	55	C	2016	2017	Georgetown	217	152	20	
Cory Higgins	United States	11	G	2011	2012	Colorado	164	38	41	
Donald Hodge	United States	35	C/F	1996	1996	Temple	0	1	0	
Ryan Hollins	United States	1; 15	C	2006	2009	UCLA	275	174	19	
Michael Holton†	United States	6	G	1988	1990	UCLA	582	107	440	
Derek Hood	United States	55	F	1999	1999	Arkansas	0	1	0	
Dave Hoppen†	United States	42	C	1988	1991	Nebraska	584	450	66	
Eddie House	United States	5	G	2004	2004	Arizona State	144	19	24	
Dwight Howard	United States	12	C	2017	2018	SACA	1,347	1,012	105	
Juwan Howard	United States	5	F	2008	2009	Michigan	171	72	24	
Larry Hughes	United States	0	G	2011	2011	Saint Louis	114	32	28	
Cedric Hunter	United States	15	G	1992	1992	Kansas	0	0	0	
Stephen Jackson	United States	1	F	2009	2011	Butler (KS)	2,758	670	499	
Sion James^	United States	4	G	2025	present	Duke	441	287	163	
Tim James	United States	25	F	2000	2001	Miami	45	35	8	
Al Jefferson	United States	25	C	2013	2016	Prentiss High School (MS)	3,238	1,641	338	
Dontell Jefferson	United States	2	G	2009	2009	Arkansas	29	12	9	
DaQuan Jeffries	United States	3	G	2024	2025	Tulsa	315	135	53	
Eddie Johnson	United States	8	F	1993	1994	Illinois	836	224	125	
Larry Johnson	United States	2	F	1991	1996	UNLV	7,405	3,479	1,553	
Linton Johnson	United States	43	F	2008	2008	Tulane	0	0	0	
Dwayne Jones	United States	27	F	2008	2008	St. Joseph's	12	12	0	
Eddie Jones	United States	6	G/F	1999	2000	Temple	1,955	461	430	
Jumaine Jones	United States	33	F	2005	2006	Georgia	799	376	63	
Kai Jones	Bahamas	23	C	2021	2023	Texas	179	134	19	
Ryan Kalkbrenner^	United States	11	C	2025	present	Creighton	521	377	54	
Frank Kaminsky	United States	44	F/C	2015	2019	Wisconsin	2,758	1,122	452	
Jason Kapono*	United States	24	F	2004	2005	UCLA	688	164	61	
Tim Kempton	United States	41	F	1988; 1994	1989; 1994	Notre Dame	509	318	108	
Randolph Keys	United States	31	F	1990	1991	Southern Mississippi	476	216	67	
Michael Kidd-Gilchrist	United States	14	F	2012	2020	Kentucky	3,738	2,388	511	
Greg Kite	United States	32	C	1989	1989	Brigham Young	38	53	7	
Brevin Knight	United States	22	G	2004	2007	Stanford	1,945	508	1,497	
Kon Knueppel^	United States	7	F	2025	present	Duke	1,498	432	274	
Arnoldas Kulboka	Lithuania	98	F	2021	2022	Bilbao (Spain)	0	0	0	
Jeremy Lamb	United States	3	G	2015	2019	Connecticut	3,424	1,274	510	
Acie Law	United States	2	G	2009	2010	Texas A&M	16	1	3	
Eric Leckner	United States	45	C	1991; 1997	1992; 1997	Wyoming	426	415	53	
Courtney Lee	United States	1	G	2016	2016	Western Kentucky	250	87	60	
Ralph Lewis†	United States	22; 11	G	1988; 1990	1989; 1990	La Salle	146	67	15	
Scottie Lewis	United States	16	G	2021	2021	Florida	1	0	1	
Jeremy Lin	United States	7	G	2015	2016	Harvard	914	253	235	
Shaun Livingston	United States	2	G	2010	2011	Peoria High School (IL)	479	149	164	
Sidney Lowe	United States	35	G	1989	1989	North Carolina State	23	34	93	
George Lynch	United States	9	F/G	2001	2002	North Carolina	172	186	54	
Kevin Lynch	United States	9	G	1991	1993	Minnesota	310	120	108	
Shelvin Mack	United States	6	G	2019	2019	Butler	9	2	1	
J. P. Macura	United States	55	G	2019	2019	Xavier	6	3	2	
Corey Maggette	United States	50	F/G	2011	2012	Duke	480	125	39	
Jamaal Magloire	Canada	21	C	2000	2002	Kentucky	1,038	756	58	
Théo Maledon	France	9	G	2022	2023	INSEP	349	146	180	
Tre Mann^	United States	23	G	2024	present	Florida	807	255	270	
Caleb Martin	United States	10	G	2019	2021	Nevada	375	179	90	
Cartier Martin	United States	1	F	2009	2009	Kansas State	86	33	13	
Cody Martin	United States	11	F	2019	2025	Nevada	1,541	913	564	
Jamal Mashburn	United States	24	F	2000	2002	Kentucky	2,386	818	582	
Anthony Mason	United States	14	F	1996	2000	Tennessee State	3,173	2,354	1,123	
Tony Massenburg	United States	32	F/C	1991	1992	Maryland	1	4	0	
Mangok Mathiang	Australia	9	C	2017	2018	Louisville	8	10	0	
Jason Maxiell	United States	54	F	2014	2015	Cincinnati	203	203	19	
Vernon Maxwell	United States	11	G	1998	1998	Florida	210	44	40	
Sean May	United States	42	F	2005	2009	North Carolina	698	411	98	
Jalen McDaniels	United States	6	F	2019	2023	San Diego State	1,370	674	235	
Michael McDonald	United States	42	C	1998	1998	New Orleans	0	1	0	
Bryce McGowens	United States	7	G	2022	2024	Nebraska	548	195	105	
Dominic McGuire	United States	5	F	2010	2011	Fresno State	174	199	43	
Jeff McInnis	United States	0	G	2007	2008	North Carolina	407	158	344	
Liam McNeeley^	United States	33	F	2025	present	UConn	132	73	24	
Josh McRoberts	United States	11	F	2013	2014	Duke	903	561	404	
Nathan Mensah	Ghana	31	C	2023	2024	San Diego State	33	65	9	
Vasilije Micić	Serbia	22	G	2024	2025	Mega Vizura (Serbia)	592	151	313	
Brad Miller	United States	40	C	1999	2000	Purdue	661	410	67	
Brandon Miller^	United States	24	F	2023	present	Alabama	3,158	765	490	
Jason Miskiri	Guyana	11	G	1999	1999	George Mason	0	0	1	
Nazr Mohammed	United States	6; 13	C	2007	2011	Kentucky	1,503	1,056	119	
Jérôme Moïso	France	6	C	2001	2002	UCLA	16	25	4	
Malik Monk	United States	1	G	2017	2021	Kentucky	2,128	461	409	
Jamario Moon	United States	9	F	2012	2012	Meridian Community College	18	22	5	
Wendell Moore Jr.	United States	9	G	2025	2025	Duke	87	51	19	
Adam Morrison	United States	35	F	2006	2009	Gonzaga	1,116	302	201	
Alonzo Mourning	United States	33	C	1992	1995	Georgetown	4,569	2,176	273	
Byron Mullens	United Kingdom; United States	22	C	2011	2013	Ohio State	1,170	664	138	
Ronald Murray	United States	22	G	2009	2010	Shaw	454	98	84	
Pete Myers	United States	20	G	1996	1996	Arkansas–Little Rock	92	67	48	
Svi Mykhailiuk	Ukraine	10	F	2023	2023	Kansas	201	46	52	
Lee Nailon	United States	54	F	2000	2002	Texas Christian	1,015	383	118	
Eduardo Nájera	Mexico	21	F	2011	2012	Oklahoma	127	94	32	
Gary Neal	United States	12	G	2014	2015	Towson	660	134	117	
Johnny Newman	United States	22	F	1990	1993	Richmond	3,208	634	480	
Frank Ntilikina	France	44	G	2023	2024	SIG Strasbourg (France)	5	6	4	
Jusuf Nurkić	Bosnia	11	C	2025	2025	Cedevita Junior (Croatia)	238	169	68	
Johnny O'Bryant III	United States	8	F	2017	2018	Louisiana State	189	101	18	
Emeka Okafor	United States	50	C/F	2004	2009	Connecticut	4,630	3,516	298	
Josh Okogie	Nigeria; United States	12	G	2025	2025	Georgia Tech	133	41	19	
Kelly Oubre Jr.	United States	12	F	2021	2023	Kansas	2,109	551	138	
Doug Overton	United States	9	G	2001	2001	La Salle	4	0	0	
Marcus Paige	United States	4	G	2017	2018	North Carolina	12	4	3	
Jannero Pargo	United States	5	G	2013	2015	Arkansas	328	45	94	
Robert Parish	United States	00	C	1994	1996	Centenary	679	653	73	
Tony Parker	France	9	G	2018	2019	INSEP	530	83	207	
Elfrid Payton	United States	22	G	2025	2025	Louisiana	6	13	20	
Elliot Perry	United States	21	G	1991	1992	Memphis	113	32	64	
Chuck Person	United States	45	F	1999	1999	Auburn	303	132	60	
Drew Peterson	United States	9	F	2025	2025	USC	5	9	2	
Bobby Phills	United States	13	G	1997	2000	Southern	1,636	461	415	
Ricky Pierce	United States	21	G	1997	1997	Rice	324	68	49	
Mason Plumlee	United States	24; 22	C	2021; 2025	2023; 2026	Duke	1,188	1,146	447	
Miles Plumlee	United States	18	C	2017	2018	Duke	31	42	3	
Aleksej Pokuševski	Serbia	17	F	2024	2024	Duke	134	79	30	
Joel Przybilla	United States	10	C	2011	2011	Minnesota	9	24	0	
Vladimir Radmanović	Serbia	10	F	2009	2009	KK FMP (Yugoslavia)	306	134	50	
Kurt Rambis	United States	31	F	1988	1989	Santa Clara	978	823	187	
Theo Ratliff	United States	42	C/F	2010	2010	Wyoming	144	117	16	
Eldridge Recasner	United States	3	G	1999	2001	Washington	332	131	135	
Antonio Reeves^	United States	12	G	2025	present	Kentucky	27	8	3	
Khalid Reeves	United States	3	G	1995	1996	Arizona	162	40	72	
J. R. Reid	United States	34; 7	G	1989; 1997	1992; 1999	North Carolina	3,124	1,903	371	
Robert Reid	United States	50	G	1988	1990	St. Mary's	1,590	445	235	
Jared Rhoden	United States	27	G	2024	2024	Seton Hall	4	4	2	
Glen Rice	United States	41	F	1995	1998	Michigan	5,651	1,049	574	
Nick Richards	Jamaica	4; 14	C	2020	2025	Kentucky	1,536	1,210	135	
Jason Richardson	United States	23	G/F	2007	2008	Michigan State	2,050	499	294	
Luke Ridnour	United States	13	G	2014	2014	Oregon	100	35	54	
Grant Riller	United States	7	G	2020	2021	Charleston	18	1	3	
Terrance Roberson	United States	8	F	2000	2000	Fresno State	0	1	1	
Brian Roberts	United States	22	G	2014	2017	Dayton	767	177	252	
Bernard Robinson	United States	21	G/F	2004	2007	Michigan	566	309	124	
Eddie Robinson	United States	32	F	1999	2001	Central Oklahoma	969	382	91	
Rumeal Robinson	Jamaica	20	G	1993	1994	Michigan	30	8	18	
Malik Rose	United States	31	F	1996	1997	Drexel	160	164	32	
Brian Rowsom	United States	32	F	1988	1990	UNC Wilmington	451	268	46	
Donald Royal	United States	5	F	1997; 1998	1997; 1998	Notre Dame	144	95	26	
Terry Rozier	United States	3	G	2019	2024	Louisville	5,974	1,269	1,395	
Kareem Rush	United States	4	G	2004	2006	Missouri	864	182	115	
Tidjane Salaün^	France	31	F	2024	present	Cholet Basket (France)	575	429	101	
Jamal Sampson*	United States	31	F/C	2004	2005	California	79	122	8	
Jeff Sanders	United States	20	F	1991	1991	Georgia Southern	13	9	1	
Steve Scheffler	United States	55	C	1990	1991	Purdue	59	45	9	
Ramon Sessions	United States	7	G	2012; 2016	2014; 2017	Nevada	1,766	359	565	
Collin Sexton	United States	8	G	2025	2026	Alabama	596	80	157	
Charles Shackleford	United States	33	C	1999	1999	North Carolina State	107	129	13	
Jerry Sichting	United States	12	G	1989	1990	Purdue	118	19	92	
Kobi Simmons	United States	14	G	2023	2023	Arizona	5	4	5	
KJ Simpson	United States	25	G	2024	2026	Colorado	366	138	147	
Jaylen Sims	United States	33	G	2025	2025	UNC Wilmington	42	5	12	
Sean Singletary	United States	44	G	2008	2009	Virginia	56	19	17	
Tamar Slay*	United States	32	G	2004	2005	Marshall	28	14	3	
Dennis Smith Jr.	United States	8	G	2022	2023	NC State	474	167	261	
Ish Smith	United States	10; 14	G	2021; 2023	2022; 2024	Wake Forest	307	133	243	
Nick Smith Jr.	United States	8	G	2023	2025	Arkansas	893	200	204	
Steve Smith	United States	8	G	2004	2005	Michigan State	291	49	57	
Theron Smith*	United States	0	F	2004	2005	Ball State	105	116	28	
Tony Smith	United States	34	G	1996	1997	Marquette	346	94	150	
Xavier Sneed	United States	22	F	2023	2023	Kansas State	17	5	5	
James Southerland	United States	31	F	2013	2013	Syracuse	0	0	0	
Lance Stephenson	United States	1	G	2014	2015	Cincinnati	501	277	240	
Julyan Stone	United States	32	G	2018	2018	Texas - El Paso	19	29	26	
Greg Sutton	United States	12	G	1994	1996	Oral Roberts	325	71	130	
Jeffery Taylor	Sweden; United States	44	F	2012	2015	Vanderbilt	807	263	107	
Garrett Temple	United States	41	G	2011	2011	Louisiana State	38	15	24	
Isaiah Thomas	United States	4	G	2022	2022	Washington	141	21	24	
Tyrus Thomas	United States	12	F/C	2010	2013	Louisiana State	1,100	636	106	
JT Thor	South Sudan	21	F	2021	2024	Auburn	528	341	84	
Otis Thorpe	United States	52	F	2000	2001	Providence	138	145	29	
Xavier Tillman Sr.^	United States	26	C	2026	present	Michigan State	13	18	8	
Mike Tobey	United States	10	C	2017	2017	Virginia	2	3	1	
Tom Tolbert	United States	23; 39	F	1988; 1994	1988; 1995	Arizona	54	38	9	
Anthony Tolliver	United States	43	F	2013	2014	Creighton	393	168	42	
Robert Traylor	United States	34	C/F	2001	2002	Michigan	228	187	37	
Kelly Tripucka	United States	7	F	1988	1991	Notre Dame	3,379	765	607	
Andre Turner	United States	10	G	1989	1989	Memphis	22	3	20	
Noah Vonleh	United States	11	F	2014	2015	Indiana	83	86	4	
Jake Voskuhl	United States	43	C	2005	2007	Connecticut	589	439	83	
Kemba Walker	United States	1; 15	G	2011	2019	Connecticut	12,009	2,317	3,308	
Gerald Wallace*	United States	3	F	2004	2011	Alabama	7,437	3,398	1,100	
Brad Wanamaker	United States	9	G	2021	2021	Pittsburgh	39	39	75	
Hakim Warrick	United States	21	F	2012	2013	Syracuse	190	89	25	
P. J. Washington	United States	25	F	2019	2024	Kentucky	3,946	1,661	703	
Briante Weber	United States	0	G	2017	2017	Virginia Commonwealth	50	22	16	
David Wesley	United States	4	G	1997	2002	Baylor	5,241	966	1,911	
Coby White^	United States	3	G	2026	present	North Carolina	328	62	64	
D. J. White	United States	8	F/C	2011; 2014	2012; 2014	Indiana	595	317	62	
Jahidi White*	United States	55	F/C	2004	2005	Georgetown	42	34	1	
Eric Williams	United States	55	F	2007	2007	Providence	12	3	1	
Grant Williams^	United States	2	F	2024	present	Tennessee	820	373	186	
Lorenzo Williams	United States	40	F	1992; 1994	1992; 1994	Stetson	2	13	0	
Mark Williams	United States	5	C	2022	2025	Duke	1,300	935	149	
Marvin Williams	United States	2	F	2014	2020	North Carolina	4,149	2,293	545	
Micheal Williams	United States	24	G	1990	1990	Baylor	151	31	77	
Mo Williams	United States	7	G	2015	2015	Alabama	465	76	163	
Reggie Williams	United States	55	F/G	2011	2013	VMI	420	144	99	
Travis Williams	United States	32	F	1997	1999	South Carolina State	151	111	22	
David Wingate	United States	55; 11	G/F	1992	1995	Georgetown	872	368	343	
Joe Wolf	United States	43; 30	C/F	1994; 1999	1995; 1999	North Carolina	90	132	37	
Isaiah Wong	United States	21	G	2024	2025	Miami (FL)	120	32	28	
Christian Wood	United States	35	F	2016	2017	UNLV	35	29	2	
Cody Zeller	United States	40	C	2013	2021	Indiana	4,062	2,824	669	
George Zidek	Czech Republic	25	C	1995	1997	UCLA	372	246	25	

== Notes ==
- ^{a} Players can sometimes be assigned more than one jersey number and play more than one position. The primary playing position is listed first.
- ^{b} Statistics were last updated January 7, 2023.
