= Continental Basketball Association Newcomer of the Year Award =

The Continental Basketball Association Newcomer of the Year was an award given to the best player in the CBA who had prior professional basketball experience, but was new to the league. The award was known as the Eastern Basketball Association Newcomer of the Year during the 1977–78 season, but the league re-branded as the Continental Basketball Association the following season and subsequently the name of the award changed.

== Key ==
^	Denotes player who simultaneously won CBA Most Valuable Player/Player of the Year Award
†	Denotes player whose team won championship that year
Ref	Reference
Player (X)	Denotes the number of times the player has been named MVP
Team (X)	Denotes the number of times a player from this team has won

== Table ==
Season	Player	Position	Nationality	Team	Prior team (league)	Ref
1977–78	Ron Davis	Forward	United States	Anchorage Northern Knights	Atlanta Hawks (NBA)	
1978–79†	Andre McCarter	Guard	United States	Rochester Zeniths	Kansas City Kings (NBA)	
1979–80†	Brad Davis	Guard	United States	Anchorage Northern Knights (2)	Indiana Pacers (NBA)	
1980–81	Cazzie Russell	Forward	United States	Philadelphia Kings	Great Falls Sky (WBA)	
1981–82	Brad Branson	Center	United States	Anchorage Northern Knights (3)	Sarila Rimini (Serie B)	
1982–83	Mike Davis	Center	United States	Albany Patroons	New York Knicks (NBA)	
1983–84	Steve Lingenfelter	Forward	United States	Wisconsin Flyers	Washington Bullets (NBA)	
1984–85	Don Collins	Forward	United States	Lancaster Lightning	Golden State Warriors (NBA)	
1985–86	John Drew	Forward	United States	Wyoming Wildcatters	Utah Jazz (NBA)	
1986–87	Eddie Johnson	Guard	United States	Tampa Bay Thrillers	Cleveland Cavaliers (NBA)	
1987–88†	Tony Campbell	Forward	United States	Albany Patroons (2)	New Jersey Jammers (USBL)	
1988–89	Randy Allen	Forward	United States	Cedar Rapids Silver Bullets	Imbelco Gent (BLB)	
1989–90	Duane Ferrell	Guard	United States	Topeka Sizzlers	Atlanta Hawks (NBA)	
1990–91	Albert King	Forward	United States	Albany Patroons	Philips Milano (LBA)	
1991–92	Stanley Brundy	Forward	United States	Rapid City Thrillers	New Jersey Nets (NBA)	
1992–93	Derek Strong	Forward	United States	Quad City Thunder	Washington Bullets (NBA)	
1993–94	Rodney Monroe	Guard	United States	Rochester Renegade	Canberra Cannons (NBL)	
1994–95	Marques Bragg	Forward	United States	Grand Rapids Mackers	Gravelines-Dunkerque (LNB)	
1995–96	Gaylon Nickerson	Guard	United States	Rapid City Thrillers	Galatasaray S.K. (BSL)	
1996–97	Anthony Tucker	Forward	United States	Florida Beach Dogs	Washington Bullets (NBA)	
1997–98†	Jeff McInnis	Guard	United States	Quad City Thunder	Panionios B.C. (GBL)	
1998–99	Damon Jones	Guard	United States	Idaho Stampede	Jacksonville Barracudas (USBL)	
1999–00	Charles Smith	Guard	United States	Rockford Lightning	Los Angeles Clippers (NBA)	
2000–01	Not awarded after league went defunct					
2001–02†	Miles Simon	Guard	United States	Dakota Wizards	Basket Livorno (LBA)	
2002–03†	Damian Cantrell	Forward	United States	Yakima Sun Kings	Ben Hur Rafaela (TNA)	
2003–04	Josh Davis	Forward	United States	Idaho Stampede	Sicc Jesi (Serie A2)	
2004–05	Billy Thomas	Guard	United States	Dakota Wizards (2)	Washington Wizards (NBA)	
2005–06	James Thomas	Forward	United States	Albany Patroons	Roanoke Dazzle (NBA D-League)	
2006–07	Shaun Fountain	Guard	United States	Indiana Alley Cats	Rome Gladiators (WBA)	
2007–08	Boo Jackson	Forward	United States	East Kentucky Miners	Holland Blast (IBL)	
