= 1988 NBA expansion draft =

Player selection draft

General information
- Sport: Basketball
- Date: June 23, 1988

Overview
- League: NBA
- Expansion teams: Charlotte Hornets; Miami Heat

The 1988 NBA expansion draft was the eighth expansion draft of the National Basketball Association (NBA). The draft was held on June 23, 1988, so that the newly founded Charlotte Hornets and Miami Heat could acquire players for the upcoming 1988–89 season. Charlotte and Miami had been awarded the expansion teams on April 22, 1987. In an NBA expansion draft, new NBA teams are allowed to acquire players from the previously established teams in the league. Not all players on a given team are available during an expansion draft, since each team can protect a certain number of players from being selected. In this draft, each of the twenty-three other NBA teams had protected eight players from their roster and the Hornets and the Heat selected eleven and twelve unprotected players respectively, one from each team. Prior to the draft, the league conducted a coin flip between the Hornets and the Heat to decide their draft order in this expansion draft and in the 1988 NBA draft. The Hornets won the coin flip and chose to have the higher pick in the 1988 Draft, thus allowing the Heat to receive the first selection and the right to select twelve players in this expansion draft.

The Heat were formed and owned by a group headed by Zev Buffman and former NBA player Billy Cunningham. Former Detroit Pistons assistant coach Ron Rothstein was hired as the franchise's first head coach. The Heat used their first pick to select former third-round pick Arvid Kramer from the Dallas Mavericks. Prior to the draft, the Heat agreed on a deal to select Kramer, who had not played in the NBA since the 1979–80 season, from the Mavericks in exchange for a first-round pick in the 1988 Draft. The Heat also agreed to three other deals not to select a particular player from the Los Angeles Lakers, the Boston Celtics and Seattle SuperSonics. The Heat's other selections included four former first-round picks, Billy Thompson, Jon Sundvold, Darnell Valentine and Dwayne Washington. However, Valentine and another draftee, Fred Roberts, were immediately traded to the Cleveland Cavaliers and Milwaukee Bucks respectively. The Heat also selected West German center Hansi Gnad, who had never played in the NBA. Four players from the expansion draft joined the Heat for their inaugural season, but only one played more than three seasons for the team. Sundvold played four seasons with the Heat until his NBA career ended in 1992.

The Hornets were formed and owned by a group headed by George Shinn. Former Indiana Pacers assistant coach Dick Harter was hired as the franchise's first head coach. The Hornets used their first pick to select former first-round pick Dell Curry from the Cleveland Cavaliers. The Hornets' other selections included one-time All-Star Rickey Green and three former first-round picks, Muggsy Bogues, Michael Brooks and Bernard Thompson. On the draft-day, the Hornets also acquired Kelly Tripucka from the Utah Jazz in exchange for Mike Brown, a draftee from the Chicago Bulls. Brooks and Thompson never played for the Hornets. Brooks left the NBA and signed with a French team, while Thompson was traded to the Houston Rockets prior to the start of the season. Six players from the expansion draft joined the Hornets for their inaugural season, but only two played more than three seasons for the team. Curry played 10 seasons with the Hornets and left the league as the Hornets' career leader in points scored, games played, three-point field goals made and attempted, and three-point field goal percentage. Bogues, the shortest player in NBA history, played nine seasons with the Hornets and is currently the Hornets' career leader in assists and steals.

== Key ==
Pos.	G	F	C
Position	Guard	Forward	Center

^{+}	Denotes player who has been selected for at least one All-Star Game
^{#}	Denotes player who has never appeared in an NBA regular-season or playoff game

== Selections ==
Pick	Player	Pos.	Nationality	Team	Previous team	NBA years^{[a]}	Career with the franchise^{[b]}	Ref.
1	Arvid Kramer^{[A]}	C	United States	Miami Heat	Dallas Mavericks	1	—^{[c]}	
2	Dell Curry	G	United States	Charlotte Hornets	Cleveland Cavaliers	2	1988–1998	
3	Billy Thompson^{[B]}	F	United States	Miami Heat	Los Angeles Lakers	2	1988–1991	
4	Dave Hoppen	F/C	United States	Charlotte Hornets	Golden State Warriors	1	1988–1991	
5	Fred Roberts^{[C]}^{[E]}	F/C	United States	Miami Heat	Boston Celtics	5	—^{[c]}	
6	Muggsy Bogues	G	United States	Charlotte Hornets	Washington Bullets	1	1988–1997	
7	Scott Hastings	F/C	United States	Miami Heat	Atlanta Hawks	6	1988–1989	
8	Mike Brown^{[F]}	F/C	United States	Charlotte Hornets	Chicago Bulls	2	—^{[c]}	
9	Jon Sundvold	G	United States	Miami Heat	San Antonio Spurs	5	1988–1992	
10	Rickey Green^{+}	G	United States	Charlotte Hornets	Utah Jazz	10	1988–1989	
11	Kevin Williams^{[D]}	G	United States	Miami Heat	Seattle SuperSonics	4	—^{[c]}	
12	Michael Holton	G	United States	Charlotte Hornets	Portland Trail Blazers	4	1988–1989	
13	Hansi Gnad^{#}	C	West Germany^{[e]}	Miami Heat	Philadelphia 76ers	0^{[d]}	—^{[c]}	
14	Michael Brooks	F	United States	Charlotte Hornets	Denver Nuggets	6	—^{[c]}	
15	Darnell Valentine^{[G]}	G	United States	Miami Heat	Los Angeles Clippers	7	—^{[c]}	
16	Bernard Thompson	G/F	United States	Charlotte Hornets	Phoenix Suns	4	—^{[c]}	
17	Dwayne Washington	G	United States	Miami Heat	New Jersey Nets	2	1988–1989	
18	Ralph Lewis	G	United States	Charlotte Hornets	Detroit Pistons	1	1988–1989; 1990	
19	Andre Turner	G	United States	Miami Heat	Houston Rockets	2	—^{[c]}	
20	Clinton Wheeler	G	United States	Charlotte Hornets	Indiana Pacers	1	—^{[c]}	
21	Conner Henry	G	United States	Miami Heat	Sacramento Kings	2	—^{[c]}	
22	Sedric Toney	G	United States	Charlotte Hornets	New York Knicks	2	—^{[c]}	
23	John Stroeder	F	United States	Miami Heat	Milwaukee Bucks	1	—^{[c]}	

== Notes ==
- ^{a} Number of years played in the NBA prior to the draft
- ^{b} Career with the expansion franchise that drafted the player
- ^{c} Never played a game for the franchise
- ^{d} Never played in the NBA prior to the expansion draft
- ^{e} Hansi Gnad represented the Germany national team after West and East Germany reunified in 1990.

== Trades ==
=== Pre-draft trades ===
Prior to the day of the draft, the following trades were made and resulted in exchanges of future draft picks between the teams, along with a particular agreement in the expansion draft.

- ^{A} The Miami Heat agreed not to select Bill Wennington, Uwe Blab or Steve Alford from the Dallas Mavericks in exchange for a 1988 first-round pick. Because the Mavericks had already protected eight of their twelve players in their roster, the only available player for selection was Arvid Kramer.
- ^{B} The Miami Heat agreed not to select Kareem Abdul-Jabbar from the Los Angeles Lakers in exchange for a 1992 second-round pick.
- ^{C} The Miami Heat agreed not to select Dennis Johnson from the Boston Celtics in exchange for a 1988 second-round pick.
- ^{D} The Miami Heat agreed not to select Danny Young from the Seattle SuperSonics in exchange for a 1988 second-round pick.

=== Draft-day trades ===
The following trades involving drafted players were made on the day of the draft.

- ^{E} The Miami Heat traded Fred Roberts to the Milwaukee Bucks in exchange for a 1989 second-round pick.
- ^{F} The Charlotte Hornets traded Mike Brown to the Utah Jazz in exchange for Kelly Tripucka.
- ^{G} The Miami Heat traded Darnell Valentine to the Cleveland Cavaliers in exchange for a 1990 second-round pick.
