= Ron Davis (basketball) =

American basketball player (born 1954)

Personal information
- Born: May 1, 1954 (age 72) Phoenix, Arizona, U.S.
- Listed height: 6 ft 6 in (1.98 m)
- Listed weight: 198 lb (90 kg)

Career information
- High school: Maryvale (Phoenix, Arizona)
- College: Glendale CC (1972–1974); Washington State (1974–1976)
- NBA draft: 1976: 5th round, 70th overall pick
- Drafted by: Atlanta Hawks
- Playing career: 1976–2000
- Position: Small forward
- Number: 13, 42

Career history
- 1976–1977: Atlanta Hawks
- 1977–1980: Anchorage Northern Knights
- 1980–1981: San Diego Clippers
- 1981–1982: Anchorage Northern Knights
- 1982–1983: Billings Volcanos
- 1987–1990: Mulhouse
- 1991: Ginebra San Miguel
- 1991–1992: Strasbourg
- 1992–1993: Roanne
- 1993–1994: Antibes
- 1994–1996: Dijon
- 1999–2000: Neptūnas

Career highlights
- CBA champion (1980); CBA Most Valuable Player (1980); 3× All-EBA/CBA First Team (1978–1980); All-CBA Second Team (1982); EBA Newcomer of the Year (1978); 4× CBA scoring champion (1979, 1980, 1982, 1983); First-team NJCAA All-American (1974)
- Stats at NBA.com
- Stats at Basketball Reference

Ronald Howard Davis (born May 1, 1954) is an American former professional basketball small forward who spent three seasons in the National Basketball Association (NBA) as a member of the Atlanta Hawks (1976–77) and the San Diego Clippers (1980–82). He attended Washington State University and was drafted during the fifth round of the 1976 NBA draft by the Hawks.

Davis played in the Eastern Basketball Association (EBA) / Continental Basketball Association (CBA) for the Anchorage Northern Knights from 1977 to 1980 and during the 1981–82 season, and the Billings Volcanos during the 1982–83 season. He won a CBA championship with the Northern Knights in 1980. He was selected as the CBA Most Valuable Player in 1980, a member of the All-EBA/CBA First Team from 1978 to 1980 and a member of the All-CBA Second Team in 1982. He is the biological father of New York Knicks player Landry Shamet.

== Career statistics ==
=== Regular season ===
Legend
GP	Games played	GS	Games started	MPG	Minutes per game
FG%	Field goal percentage	3P%	3-point field goal percentage	FT%	Free throw percentage
RPG	Rebounds per game	APG	Assists per game	SPG	Steals per game
BPG	Blocks per game	PPG	Points per game	**Bold**	Career high
†	Won an NBA championship	*	Led the league

**Bold**	Denotes career high
†	Denotes seasons in which Davis' team won a CBA championship

Year	Team	GP	GS	MPG	FG%	3P%	FT%	RPG	APG	SPG	BPG	PPG
1976–77	Atlanta	7	–	9.6	.229	.246	.308	1.0	0.3	1.0	0.0	2.9
1978–79	Anchorage (CBA)	48	–	**43.8**	.516	.150	**.747**	**12.3**	2.5	1.6	1.0	29.9*
1979–80†	Anchorage (CBA)	45	–	38.0	.486	.313	.656	10.9	2.6	1.4	**1.1**	32.0*
1980–81	San Diego	**64**	–	12.8	.443	.250	.595	1.9	0.7	0.6	0.2	5.8
1981–82	San Diego	7	–	9.6	.400	–	.500	1.9	0.6	0.0	0.0	3.3
1981–82	Anchorage (CBA)	31	–	41.8	.539	**.353**	.653	10.1	**3.5**	**1.7**	0.9	**35.1**‡
1982–83	Billings (CBA)	31	–	43.3	**.552**	.318	.652	11.6	3.4	1.2	0.9	30.3*
Career		229	–	28.4	.452	.198	.587	7.1	1.9	1.1	0.6	19.9

=== Playoffs ===
Year	Team	GP	GS	MPG	FG%	3P%	FT%	RPG	APG	SPG	BPG	PPG
1979	Anchorage (CBA)	8	–	43.1	**.621**	**.333**	**.761**	**15.4**	**3.5**	**2.0**	**1.0**	**41.4**
1980†	Anchorage (CBA)	**12**	–	**46.3**	.464	.194	.691	10.6	2.5	1.7	0.8	27.8
Career		20	–	45.0	.532	.216	.724	12.5	2.9	1.8	0.9	33.2
