= Bill Klucas =

Biographical details
- Born: July 8, 1941; Vermillion, Ohio, U.S.
- Died: April 22, 2014 (aged 72); Brownsville, Minnesota, U.S.

Playing career
- ?: Ashland

Coaching career (HC unless noted)
- ?–?: Ashland (asst.)
- ?–?: Ohio State (assistant)
- 1971–1973: Minnesota (assistant)
- 1973–1975: Milwaukee
- 1975–1976: Palmeiras
- 1976–1977: Hartford Downtowners
- 1977–1978: Anchorage Northern Knights
- 1978–1979: Montana Sky
- 1979–1981: Anchorage Northern Knights
- 1981–1983: Billings Volcanos
- 1983–1985: Wisconsin Flyers
- 1985–1986: Wyoming Wildcatters
- 1986–1988: Wisconsin/Rochester Flyers
- 1989–1990: Columbus Horizon
- 1991–1992: Saskatoon Slam
- 1993–1994: Yakima Sun Kings
- 1996–1998: Winnipeg Cyclone
- 1998–1999: Rochester Skeeters
- 1999–2000: La Crosse Bobcats (assistant)
- 2000–2001: La Crosse Bobcats
- 2001–2002: Saskatchewan Hawks

Accomplishments and honors

Championships
- CBA champion (1980); CBA Coach of the Year (1980)

William Arthur Klucas (July 8, 1941 – April 22, 2014) was an American college and professional basketball coach. Klucas coached over 500 games in the Continental Basketball Association (CBA), coached professionally in Canada and Brazil, and was an assistant college coach at Ashland University, Ohio State University and the University of Minnesota. He was also head coach for the University of Wisconsin–Milwaukee for two seasons. In 1980, Klucas was named CBA Coach of the Year and his Anchorage Northern Knights won the league championship.
