= Larry Knight =

American basketball player

Personal information
- Born: November 5, 1956 (age 70) Detroit, Michigan, U.S.
- Listed height: 6 ft 8 in (2.03 m)
- Listed weight: 220 lb (100 kg)

Career information
- High school: Northeastern (Detroit, Michigan)
- College: Ellsworth CC (1975–1977); Loyola Chicago (1977–1979)
- NBA draft: 1979: 1st round, 20th overall pick
- Drafted by: Utah Jazz
- Playing career: 1979–1986
- Position: Power forward

Career history
- 1979–1980: Anchorage Northern Knights
- 1980–1981: Billings Volcanos
- 1984–1985: USC Heidelberg
- 1985–1986: Nashua Den Bosch

Career highlights
- CBA champion (1980); All-CBA Second Team (1980)
- Stats at Basketball Reference

Larry Knight (born November 5, 1956) is an American former collegiate and professional basketball player. Knight was drafted by the Utah Jazz in the first round (20th pick) of the 1979 National Basketball Association (NBA) draft.

== College career ==
Knight played collegiately at Ellsworth Community College and at Loyola Chicago. In his two years with the Loyola Ramblers, he grabbed a total of 729 rebounds (13.5 rebounds per game). In 1978–79, Knight averaged a team-high 21.5 points per contest.

== Professional career ==
After being cut by the Jazz 11 days prior to their season opener, Knight played for the 1979–80 Anchorage Northern Knights of the Continental Basketball Association (CBA) who won the league championship. He was a 1980 CBA All-League Second Team selection. Knight played two seasons in the CBA, moving to the Billings Volcanos in 1980. He averaged 19.1 points and 14.3 rebounds in 86 games in the league.

He played professionally overseas, including stints in Germany (USC Heidelberg, 1984–85) and the Netherlands (Nashua Den Bosch, 1985–86).
