= Northern Knights =

Northern Knights may refer to:

- Northern Knights Football Club, a youth Australian rules football team based in Preston, Victoria
- Northern Knights (cricket team), a first-class provincial cricket team based in Belfast
- Anchorage Northern Knights, a former professional basketball team based in Anchorage, Alaska
- Northern Districts men's cricket team, a Twenty20 domestic cricket team based in Hamilton, New Zealand, formerly known as the Northern Knights
