= Lawrence Boston =

American basketball player

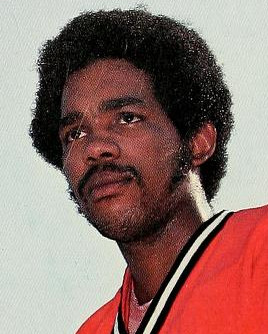
- Boston with the Maryland Terrapins c. 1976

Personal information
- Born: May 18, 1956 (age 70) Cleveland, Ohio
- Listed height: 6 ft 8 in (2.03 m)
- Listed weight: 225 lb (102 kg)

Career information
- High school: John F. Kennedy (Cleveland, Ohio)
- College: Vincennes (1974–1975); Maryland (1975–1978)
- NBA draft: 1978: 4th round, 81st overall pick
- Drafted by: Washington Bullets
- Playing career: 1978–1987
- Position: Power forward
- Number: 4

Career history
- 1978–1979: Hurlingham Trieste
- 1979–1980: Rochester Zeniths
- 1980: Lehigh Valley Jets
- 1980: Maine Lumberjacks
- 1980: Washington Bullets
- 1980–1981: Maine Lumberjacks
- 1981: Rochester Zeniths
- 1981–1982: Liberti Treviso
- 1982–1983: ASVEL Lyon-Villeurbanne
- 1983–1984: Pully
- 1984–1985: Unicaja Málaga
- 1985–1986: Mariembourg Royale
- 1986–1987: ABC Nantes
- 1987: Allibert Livorno

Career highlights
- Fourth-team Parade All-American (1974)
- Stats at NBA.com
- Stats at Basketball Reference

Lawrence D. Boston (born May 18, 1956) is an American former professional basketball player.

Born in Cleveland, Ohio, he played college basketball for the Maryland Terrapins.

Boston was selected by the Washington Bullets as the 81st overall pick of the 1978 NBA draft. He played for the Bullets in the National Basketball Association (NBA) for 13 games during the 1979–80 season. He was also under contract with the Cleveland Cavaliers in September 1979, but did not play in the NBA for them.

Boston played professionally in several countries in Europe for over a decade.

== Career statistics ==
Legend
GP	Games played	GS	Games started	MPG	Minutes per game
FG%	Field goal percentage	3P%	3-point field goal percentage	FT%	Free throw percentage
RPG	Rebounds per game	APG	Assists per game	SPG	Steals per game
BPG	Blocks per game	PPG	Points per game	**Bold**	Career high

=== NBA ===
==== Regular season ====
Year	Team	GP	MPG	FG%	3P%	FT%	RPG	APG	SPG	BPG	PPG
1979–80	Washington	13	9.6	.462	–	.615	3.0	.2	.3	.2	4.3
