= Arvid Kramer =

American basketball player (1956–2026)

Personal information
- Born: October 3, 1956 Fulda, Minnesota, U.S.
- Died: October 22, 2026 (aged 70) Saint Paul, Minnesota, U.S.
- Listed height: 6 ft 9 in (2.06 m)
- Listed weight: 220 lb (100 kg)

Career information
- High school: Fulda (Fulda, Minnesota)
- College: Augustana (South Dakota) (1975–1979)
- NBA draft: 1979: 3rd round, 45th overall pick
- Drafted by: Utah Jazz
- Playing career: 1979–1996
- Position: Center
- Number: 41

Career history
- 1979–1980: Anchorage Northern Knights
- 1980: Denver Nuggets
- 1980–1981: Antonini Siena
- 1982–1983: Bayer Giants Leverkusen
- 1995–1996: Telekom Baskets Bonn

Career highlights
- NCC Player of the Year (1978); 3× First-team All-NCC (1977–1979)
- Stats at NBA.com
- Stats at Basketball Reference

Arvid Dean Kramer (October 3, 1956 – October 22, 2026) was an American professional basketball player, mostly known for being the first overall pick by the Miami Heat of the National Basketball Association (NBA) in the 1988 expansion draft at the age of 31, and furthermore being the only player to be selected in two expansion drafts and never playing for the teams that drafted him. He was 6 feet 9 inches (2.06 m) tall and 220 pounds (100 kg) and played at the center position during most of his basketball career.

== College career ==
Kramer played college basketball for the Division II Augustana Vikings, where he was a three-time All-North Central Conference selection and the league's MVP following his junior season in 1978. That year, the Vikings won the conference championship with an 11-3 record behind Kramer's team-leading 490 points and 264 rebounds. Kramer ranks 12th all-time on the Vikings' career scoring list with 1,642 points and firth on the all-time rebounding list with 892 boards.

In 1992, Kramer was inducted into the Augustana Athletics Hall of Fame.

== Professional career ==
=== Anchorage Northern Knights (1979–1980) ===
Kramer was drafted by the Utah Jazz in the 3rd round (1st pick, 45th overall) of the 1979 NBA draft in his senior year. After the draft, the Jazz made a 2-for-1 trade involving Bernard King, which left no room for Kramer on their roster, so they waived him. He played for the Anchorage Northern Knights of the Continental Basketball Association during the 1979–80 season.

=== Denver Nuggets (1980) ===
Kramer was signed to a 10-day contract by the Denver Nuggets on February 28, 1980, and was later signed for the remainder of the season. He only played eight games with the Nuggets during the 1979–80 season.

=== Telekom Baskets Bonn (1995–1996) ===
The expansion Miami Heat of the NBA made Kramer the first overall pick in the 1988 expansion draft at the age of 31. The Dallas Mavericks wanted to make sure that their players Uwe Blab, Steve Alford or Bill Wennington, who were left unprotected, would not be selected, so they offered the Miami Heat the rights to Arvid Kramer and their first choice (No. 20) in the college draft (which later would turn out to become Kevin Edwards). He never played for the Heat.

Kramer later played for Telekom Baskets Bonn during the 1995–96 season. He retired as a player in 1996 and worked as a general manager for the Baskets in Bonn, Germany from 1996 to 2004.

== Personal life and death ==
Kramer's son Dennis Kramer was also a basketball player. He was killed in a road traffic incident on August 27, 2023.

Arvid Kramer died at a hospital in Saint Paul, Minnesota, on October 22, 2026, at the age of 70.

== Career statistics ==
Legend
GP	Games played	GS	Games started	MPG	Minutes per game
FG%	Field goal percentage	3P%	3-point field goal percentage	FT%	Free throw percentage
RPG	Rebounds per game	APG	Assists per game	SPG	Steals per game
BPG	Blocks per game	PPG	Points per game	**Bold**	Career high

=== NBA ===
==== Regular season ====
Year	Team	GP	MPG	FG%	3P%	FT%	RPG	APG	SPG	BPG	PPG
1978–79	Denver	8	5.6	.318	–	1.000	1.5	.4	.0	.6	2.0
