= Randy Owens =

American basketball player (1959–2015)

Personal information
- Born: May 12, 1959
- Died: December 1, 2015 (aged 56) Philadelphia, Pennsylvania
- Listed height: 6 ft 7 in (2.01 m)
- Listed weight: 180 lb (82 kg)

Career information
- High school: Germantown (Philadelphia, Pennsylvania)
- College: Philadelphia (1977–1980)
- NBA draft: 1980: 6th round, 124th overall pick
- Drafted by: Indiana Pacers
- Position: Power forward / center

Career history
- 1980–1981: Scranton Aces
- 1981–1982: Rochester Zeniths
- 1982–1983: Maine Lumberjacks
- 1985–1988: Juver Murcia
- Stats at Basketball Reference

Randolph Owens (May 12, 1959 – December 1, 2015) was an American basketball player. He played the center and forward positions. He was drafted in the 1980 NBA draft in Round 6 by the Indiana Pacers. He played in the Continental Basketball Association for three years, in the Israel Basketball Premier League for five years, and in a number of other countries.

== Biography ==
Owens was 6 ft 7 in (2.01 m) tall, and weighed 180 pounds (82 kg). He attended Germantown High School in Philadelphia, Pennsylvania.

Owens then attended Philadelphia College of Textiles & Science (now known as Thomas Jefferson University). He played basketball there. As a sophomore in 1978–1979, he was 19th in the NCAA Division II with a field goal percentage of .588, and was a National Association of Basketball Coaches Division II Second Team All American.

Owens entered the 1980 NBA draft as an Early Entrant. He was drafted in Round 6, as Pick 9, by the Indiana Pacers, 124th overall.

He played in the Continental Basketball Association for three years. Owens played for the Scranton Aces in Scranton, Pennsylvania in 1980–81 (and was second in the CBA in points scored), Rochester Zeniths in Rochester, New York in 1981–82, and the Maine Lumberjacks in Bangor, Maine in 1982–83.

Owens played basketball in Israel for five years, including for Hapoel Holon and Maccabi Haifa in the Israel Basketball Premier League. He also played in Spain, Argentina, and the Philippines.

He died of cancer at the age of 56 in Philadelphia.
