= All-American Basketball Alliance =

All-American Basketball Alliance (AABA)
- Sport: Basketball
- Founded: 1977
- First season: 1977–78
- Folded: 1978
- No. of teams: 8
- Country: United States
- Continent: FIBA Americas (Americas)
- Last champion: Rochester Zeniths (1st title)
- Most titles: Rochester Zeniths (1 title)

The All-American Basketball Alliance was formed in 1977, with the intention of competing with the established Continental Basketball Association as the premier basketball minor league in the United States. Eight teams competed in the only season of the AABA, which consisted of forty games and ran from January 6, 1978 until February 2, 1978.

== Teams ==
The teams were divided into two divisions, shown below with their win–loss records at the time of dispersion.

North Division

- Rochester Zeniths (10–1)
- Kentucky Stallions (7–5)
- New York Guard (4–5)
- Indiana Wizards (0–8)

South Division

- Carolina Lightning (8–2)
- Georgia Titans (5–3)
- Richmond Virginians (3–8)
- West Virginia Wheels (3–8)

The Zeniths, with the best record in the league, went on to join the established Continental Basketball Association (CBA), which they won twice. Eddie Owens of the Zeniths scored the most points in the league with 282, while the Stallions' Bobby Wilson netted the most points per game with 26.6.

A number of phantom franchises were also signed up for the Alliance, but never actually played a game; these were:

- Alabama Aces
- Baton Rouge
- Carolina Dragons
- Indiana Impalas
- Massachusetts Rifles
- New York Greyhounds
- Ohio Orbits
- Rhode Island Devils
- Springfield
- Toronto
- Virginia Sailors

== Notable players ==
=== International players ===
NT	Player	Period	Appearances	Notes
(United States) USA	Norm Cook	1975	9	Panamerican Games
