= Brad Branson =

American basketball player (1958–2026)

Personal information
- Born: September 24, 1958 Harvey, Illinois, U.S.
- Died: January 27, 2026 (aged 67)
- Listed height: 6 ft 10 in (2.08 m)
- Listed weight: 220 lb (100 kg)

Career information
- High school: North Fort Myers (North Fort Myers, Florida)
- College: Florida SouthWestern (1976–1978); SMU (1978–1980)
- NBA draft: 1980: 2nd round, 45th overall pick
- Drafted by: Detroit Pistons
- Playing career: 1980–1994
- Position: Center / power forward
- Number: 52

Career history
- 1980–1981: Sarila Rimini
- 1981–1982: Anchorage Northern Knights
- 1982: Cleveland Cavaliers
- 1982–1983: Indiana Pacers
- 1983–1986: Silverstone Brescia
- 1986–1988: Real Madrid
- 1988–1994: Pamesa Valencia

Career highlights
- CBA All-Star Game MVP (1982); CBA Newcomer of the Year (1982); CBA blocks leader (1982)
- Stats at NBA.com
- Stats at Basketball Reference

Bradley Alexander Branson (September 24, 1958 – January 27, 2026) was an American professional basketball player who played forward for two seasons in the National Basketball Association (NBA) and then played for over a decade in Europe. Branson played college basketball for the SMU Mustangs.

== Professional career ==
After being selected by the Detroit Pistons in the second round of the 1980 NBA draft, Branson opted to play in Italy for Sarila Rimini.

Branson returned to the United States the next season to play for Anchorage Northern Knights of the Continental Basketball Association (CBA), earning CBA Newcomer of the Year honors. He played 10 games for NBA's Cleveland Cavaliers that season and then after a trade played 62 games for the Indiana Pacers in 1982–83.

His career continued overseas in Italy and Spain. Playing for Real Madrid, Branson averaged 22.3 points and 9.5 rebounds in 38 minutes in 1986-87 and led the club to the Korac Cup in 1988.

Branson moved on to Pamesa Valencia, playing six seasons with the club before retiring in 1994.

== Personal life and death ==
Branson's biological father, Lou Scott, won an NCAA basketball championship with Indiana University in 1954.

Branson died on January 27, 2026, at the age of 67.

== Career statistics ==
Legend
GP	Games played	GS	Games started	MPG	Minutes per game
FG%	Field goal percentage	3P%	3-point field goal percentage	FT%	Free throw percentage
RPG	Rebounds per game	APG	Assists per game	SPG	Steals per game
BPG	Blocks per game	PPG	Points per game	**Bold**	Career high

=== NBA ===
==== Regular season ====
Year	Team	GP	GS	MPG	FG%	3P%	FT%	RPG	APG	SPG	BPG	PPG
1981–82	Cleveland	10	**3**	**17.6**	.404	–	**.917**	**3.3**	.6	**.5**	**.4**	5.3
1982–83	Indiana	**62**	2	11.0	**.425**	.000	.704	2.8	**.7**	.4	**.4**	**5.5**
Career		72	5	11.9	.422	.000	.725	2.9	.7	.4	.4	5.4
