= Al Leslie =

American basketball player (born 1960)

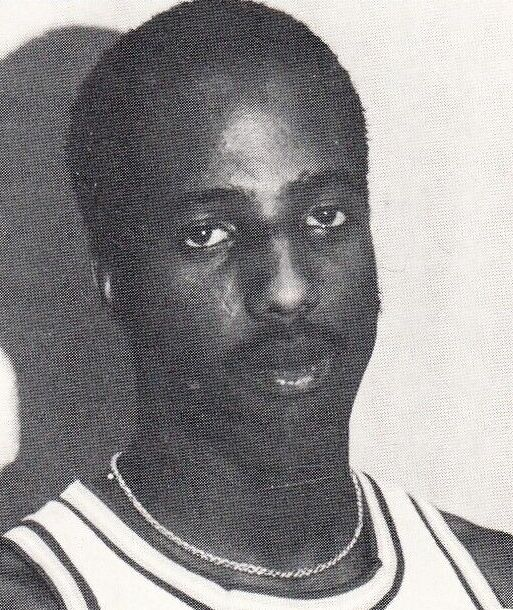
- Leslie with the Rochester Zeniths in 1981

Personal information
- Born: March 14, 1960 (age 66) Baltimore, Maryland, U.S.
- Listed height: 6 ft 3 in (1.91 m)
- Listed weight: 185 lb (84 kg)

Career information
- High school: McDonogh School (Owings Mills, Maryland)
- College: Bucknell (1977–1981)
- NBA draft: 1981: 2nd round, 37th overall pick
- Drafted by: Indiana Pacers
- Playing career: 1981–1983
- Position: Shooting guard
- Coaching career: 1984–1986

Career history

Playing
- 1981–1983: Rochester Zeniths

Coaching
- 1984–1986: Bucknell (assistant)

Career highlights
- 2× First-team All-ECC (1980, 1981); Second-team All–ECC (1979); No. 22 retired by Bucknell Bison
- Stats at Basketball Reference

Albert V. Leslie (born March 14, 1960) is an American former professional basketball player and coach. He played collegiately for the Bucknell Bison, where he is considered the program's "finest basketball player" and held the program's scoring record for 32 years. (Note: Leslie ranks second as he was surpassed by Mike Muscala during the 2012–13 season.) Leslie still holds team records in field goals made and attempted, while his 45-point performance in a 1980 game against the American Eagles is the highest scoring game by a Bucknell player in the modern era.

Leslie was selected by the Indiana Pacers as the 37th overall pick in the 1981 NBA draft. He was one of the team's final preseason cuts and ultimately never played in the National Basketball Association (NBA). Leslie played for the Rochester Zeniths in the Continental Basketball Association (CBA) from 1981 to 1983.

Leslie served as an assistant coach for the Bucknell Bison from 1984 to 1986 while also coaching at his former high school, McDonogh School. He was inducted into the Bucknell Hall of Fame in 1986.

Leslie was working as a General Educational Development (GED) mathematics instructor for Job Corps in Woodstock, Maryland, as of 2012.

== Career statistics ==
Legend
GP	Games played	GS	Games started	MPG	Minutes per game
FG%	Field goal percentage	3P%	3-point field goal percentage	FT%	Free throw percentage
RPG	Rebounds per game	APG	Assists per game	SPG	Steals per game
BPG	Blocks per game	PPG	Points per game	**Bold**	Career high

=== College ===
Year	Team	GP	GS	MPG	FG%	3P%	FT%	RPG	APG	SPG	BPG	PPG
1977–78	Bucknell	27	–	–	**.474**	–	.708	4.5	.6	–	–	13.6
1978–79	Bucknell	27	–	–	.447	–	.761	4.6	2.0	–	–	18.7
1979–80	Bucknell	27	–	–	.460	–	.753	**5.4**	1.8	–	–	**20.9**
1980–81	Bucknell	**28**	–	**34.3**	.446	–	**.826**	5.0	**3.0**	**2.1**	**.2**	19.2
Career		109	–	34.3	.455	–	.768	4.9	1.9	2.1	.2	18.1
