= Salina Rattlers =

Basketball team in Salina, Kansas

- Division: IBA East Division (2000–2001)
- League: International Basketball Association
- Founded: 2000
- Folded: 2001
- History: Rochester Skeeters (1998–2000); Salina Rattlers (2000–2001)
- Arena: Bicentennial Center
- Capacity: 7,583
- Location: Salina, Kansas
- President: Tom Hughes
- General manager: Todd Jadlow
- Head coach: Tom Hughes
- Championships: 0

The Salina Rattlers were a professional basketball franchise based in Salina, Kansas, that competed for one season in the International Basketball Association (IBA). They played their home games at the Bicentennial Center. The team folded along with the IBA after the 2000–01 season.

== Personnel ==
Head Coach

#	Name	Term	Regular season				Playoffs				Achievements	Reference
#	Name	Term	GC	W	L	Win%	GC	W	L	Win%	Achievements	Reference
1	Tom Hughes	2000–2001	40	9	31	.225	0	0	0	.000		

== Season by season record ==
Season	GP	W	L	Pct.	Finish	Playoff Wins	Playoff Losses	Playoff Results
2000–01	40	9	31	.225	5th IBA East	0	0	DNQ
Totals	40	9	31	.225	–	0	0	None
