= James Terry (basketball) =

American-Israeli basketball player

James Terry ג'יימס טרי
Personal information
- Born: November 26, 1960 (age 65) Cleveland, Ohio
- Listed height: 6 ft 11 in (2.11 m)
- Listed weight: 220 lb (100 kg)

Career information
- College: Howard University
- NBA draft: 1982: 9th round, 196th overall pick
- Drafted by: Washington Wizards
- Playing career: 1982–1996
- Position: Center

Career history
- 1982–1983: Maine Lumberjacks
- 1983–1985: Maccbi Haifa
- 1985–1986: Stefanel Trieste
- 1986: Caja de Álava
- 1986–1988: Hapoel Holon
- 1988–1989: Hapoel Tel Aviv
- 1989–1990: Hapoel Holon
- 1990–1991: Hapoel Tel Aviv
- 1991: Hapoel Holon
- 1992–1994: Hapoel Naharia
- 1994–1995: Hapoel Tel Aviv
- 1995–1996: Hapoel Eilat
- Stats at Basketball Reference

James Louis Terry (Hebrew: ג'יימס טרי; born November 26, 1960) is an American-Israeli former basketball player. He played the center position. He played in the Israeli Premier League between 1983 and 1996.

== Biography ==
Terry was born in Cleveland, Ohio. He is 6 ft 11 in (211 cm) tall, and weighs 220 pounds.

He attended Howard University ('82), and played basketball for the Howard Bison basketball p from 1978 to 1982. In 2016, Terry was inducted into the Howard University Athletic Hall of Fame.

Terry was drafted in the 1982 NBA draft in Round 9, Pick 196, by the Washington Wizards.

In 1982, Terry played 44 games for the Maine Lumberjacks in the Continental Basketball Association. That year he converted to Judaism. He later became an Israeli citizen, and served in the Israel Defense Forces.

Terry played in the Israeli Basketball Premier League between 1983 and 1996, for Maccabi Haifa, Hapoel Holon, Hapoel Tel Aviv, Ironi Nahariya, and Hapoel Eilat, in Spain for Saski Baskonia, and in Italy for Stefanel Trieste.

In 2007, after retiring from basketball, Terry was working as a construction supervisor.
