= Gaylon Nickerson =

American basketball player (born 1969)

Personal information
- Born: February 5, 1969 (age 57) Osceola, Arkansas, U.S.
- Listed height: 6 ft 3 in (1.91 m)
- Listed weight: 190 lb (86 kg)

Career information
- High school: Wichita North (Wichita, Kansas)
- College: Wichita State (1989–1990); Butler CC (1990–1991); Kansas State (1991–1992); Northwestern Oklahoma State (1993–1994)
- NBA draft: 1994: 2nd round, 34th overall pick
- Drafted by: Atlanta Hawks
- Playing career: 1994–2003
- Position: Shooting guard
- Number: 9, 15

Career history
- 1994–1995: Galatasaray S.K.
- 1995: Rapid City Thrillers
- 1995–1996: Oklahoma City Cavalry
- 1996–1997: San Antonio Spurs
- 1997: Oklahoma City Cavalry
- 1997: Washington Bullets
- 1997: Oklahoma City Cavalry
- 1997: Pallacanestro Virtus Roma
- 1997–1998: Cáceres CB
- 1998–2000: CB Valladolid
- 2002: Oklahoma Storm
- 2003: Mansfield Hawks

Career highlights
- CBA champion (1997); All-CBA First Team (1997); CBA Newcomer of the Year (1996); CBA scoring champion (1997); Mr. Kansas Basketball (1988)

Career NBA statistics
- Points: 15 (3.8 ppg)
- Rebounds: 5 (1.3 rpg)
- Assists: 1 (0.3 apg)
- Stats at NBA.com
- Stats at Basketball Reference

Gaylon Harrel Nickerson (born February 5, 1969) is an American former professional basketball player who played in the National Basketball Association (NBA) and other leagues. Born in Osceola, Arkansas, he attended Wichita State University, Butler Community College, Kansas State University, and Northwestern Oklahoma State University.

Nickerson was selected in the second round (34th overall) of the 1994 NBA draft by the Atlanta Hawks. He split the 1996–97 NBA season with the San Antonio Spurs and the Washington Bullets, playing just four games. Nickerson was also selected in the second round of the 1994 Continental Basketball Association (CBA) Draft. He won a CBA championship with the Oklahoma City Cavalry in 1997. He was selected as the CBA Newcomer of the Year in 1996 and named to the All-CBA First Team in 1997. He led the league in scoring in 1996–97, averaging 22.5 points per game while with the Cavalry.

Gaylon "Skip" Nickerson is the founder of GetYourGameTight "GYGT" and was established in 2007. GYGT is a mentorship that helps the youth with improving their skills in basketball and education.

In July 2025, GYGT has launched a Podcast that focuses on all the latest conversations pertaining to sports and everyday life.
