= Rochester Skeeters =

- Division: IBA East Division (1998–2000)
- League: International Basketball Association
- Founded: 1998
- History: Rochester Skeeters (1998–2000); Salina Rattlers (2000–2001)
- Arena: Mayo Civic Center
- Capacity: 5,000
- Location: Rochester, Minnesota
- Head coach: Bill Klucas
- Ownership: David Rowland
- Championships: 0
- Conference titles: 0
- Division titles: 0

The Rochester Skeeters was a professional basketball club based in Rochester, Minnesota that competed in the International Basketball Association beginning in the 1998-99 season. The team's head coach and general manager was basketball veteran Bill Klucas. The team's assistant general manager was Chris Lindauer.

== History ==
During the first season—the team’s best, average and record-wise—they played to nearly 1,500 fans per night, finishing second in the league in average attendance. After a .500 record of 17-17, the Skeeters just missed the IBA Division playoffs.

The second season in 1999-2000 did not play out as well. Klucas and Lindauer both left the organization. New coach Greg Lockridge used 30 different players in the season. The Skeeters posted a league-worst 8-28 record (after a 4-21 start) and were the only team to not make the IBA playoffs. Attendance dropped to just over 800 a game.

The Skeeters were sold in 2000, relocated and renamed the Salina Rattlers. The Rattlers compiled a 9-31 record, averaged 577 fans a game and folded after just one season.

== Personnel ==
Head Coaches

| # | Name | Term | Regular season | | | | Playoffs | | | | Achievements | Reference |
| # | Name | Term | GC | W | L | Win% | GC | W | L | Win% | Achievements | Reference |
|---|---|---|---|---|---|---|---|---|---|---|---|---|
| 1 | Bill Klucas | 1998–1999 | 34 | 17 | 17 | .500 | 2 | 0 | 2 | .000 | | |
| 2 | Greg Lockridge | 1999–2000 | 36 | 8 | 28 | .222 | 0 | 0 | 0 | .000 | | |

== Season results ==
| Season | GP | W | L | Pct. | Finish | Playoff Wins | Playoff Losses | Pct. | Playoff Results |
|---|---|---|---|---|---|---|---|---|---|
| 1998-99 | 34 | 17 | 17 | .500 | 3rd | 0 | 2 | .000 | Lost semi finals 2-0 to the Des Moines Dragons |
| 1999-00 | 36 | 8 | 28 | .222 | 4th | 0 | 0 | .000 | DNQ |
| All-time | 70 | 25 | 45 | .357 | -- | 0 | 2 | .000 | -- |
