= List of Miami Heat head coaches =

The Miami Heat are an American professional basketball team based in Miami, Florida. They play in the Southeast Division of the Eastern Conference in the National Basketball Association (NBA). The team joined the NBA in 1988 as an expansion team with the Charlotte Hornets, and won its first NBA championship in 2006. The team played its home games at the Miami Arena until 2000, and have played its home games at the American Airlines Arena since then. The Heat is owned by Micky Arison.

There have been six head coaches for the Heat franchise. The franchise's first head coach was Ron Rothstein, who served for three seasons with the Heat. Pat Riley, having coached the Heat for eleven seasons in two stints, is the franchise's all-time leader for the most regular-season games coached (849), the most regular-season game wins (454), the most playoff games coached (50), and the most playoff-game wins (26); Erik Spoelstra is the franchise's all-time leader for the highest winning percentage in the regular season (.707) and total wins (607). Riley is the only Heat head coach to be named one of the top 10 coaches in NBA history, to have won the NBA Coach of the Year Award, having won it in the 1996–97 season and to have been elected into the Basketball Hall of Fame as a coach, having been elected into the Hall of Fame in 2008. Spoelstra is the only Heat head coach to have spent his entire NBA coaching career with the Heat, and has been the head coach of the Heat since 2008.

== Key ==
GC	Games coached
W	Wins
L	Losses
Win%	Winning percentage
#	Number of coaches^{[a]}
*	Spent entire NBA head coaching career with the Heat
†	Elected into the Basketball Hall of Fame as a coach

== Coaches ==
Note: Statistics are correct through the end of the 2025–26 season.

#	Name	Term^{[b]}	GC	W	L	Win%	GC	W	L	Win%	Achievements	Reference
#	Name	Term^{[b]}	Regular season				Playoffs				Achievements	Reference
1	Ron Rothstein	1988–1991	246	57	189	.232	—	—	—	—		
2	Kevin Loughery	1991–1995	292	133	159	.455	8	2	6	.250		
3	Alvin Gentry	1995	36	15	21	.417	—	—	—	—		
4	Pat Riley	1995–2003	624	354	270	.567	43	18	25	.419	One of the top 10 coaches in NBA history (1996); 1996–97 NBA Coach of the Year; One of the 15 Greatest Coaches in NBA History (2022)	
5	Stan Van Gundy	2003–2005	185	112	73	.605	28	17	11	.607		
—	Pat Riley	2005–2008	225	100	125	.444	27	16	11	.593	NBA championship (2006)	
6	Erik Spoelstra*	2008–present	1,441	830	611	.576	193	110	83	.570	NBA championship (2012, 2013); One of the 15 Greatest Coaches in NBA History (2022)	

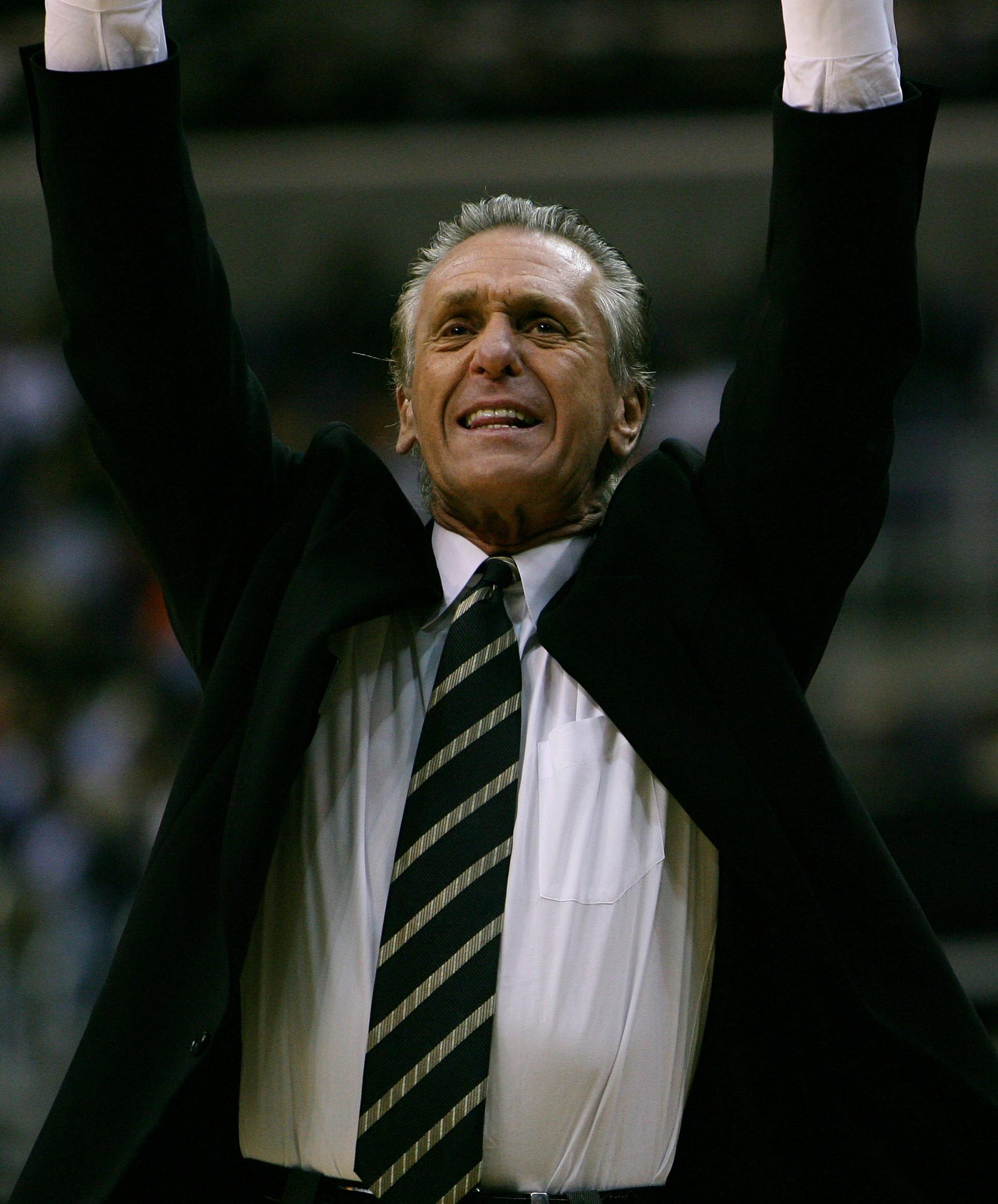
Pat Riley coached the Heat to the NBA championship in the 2006 NBA Finals.

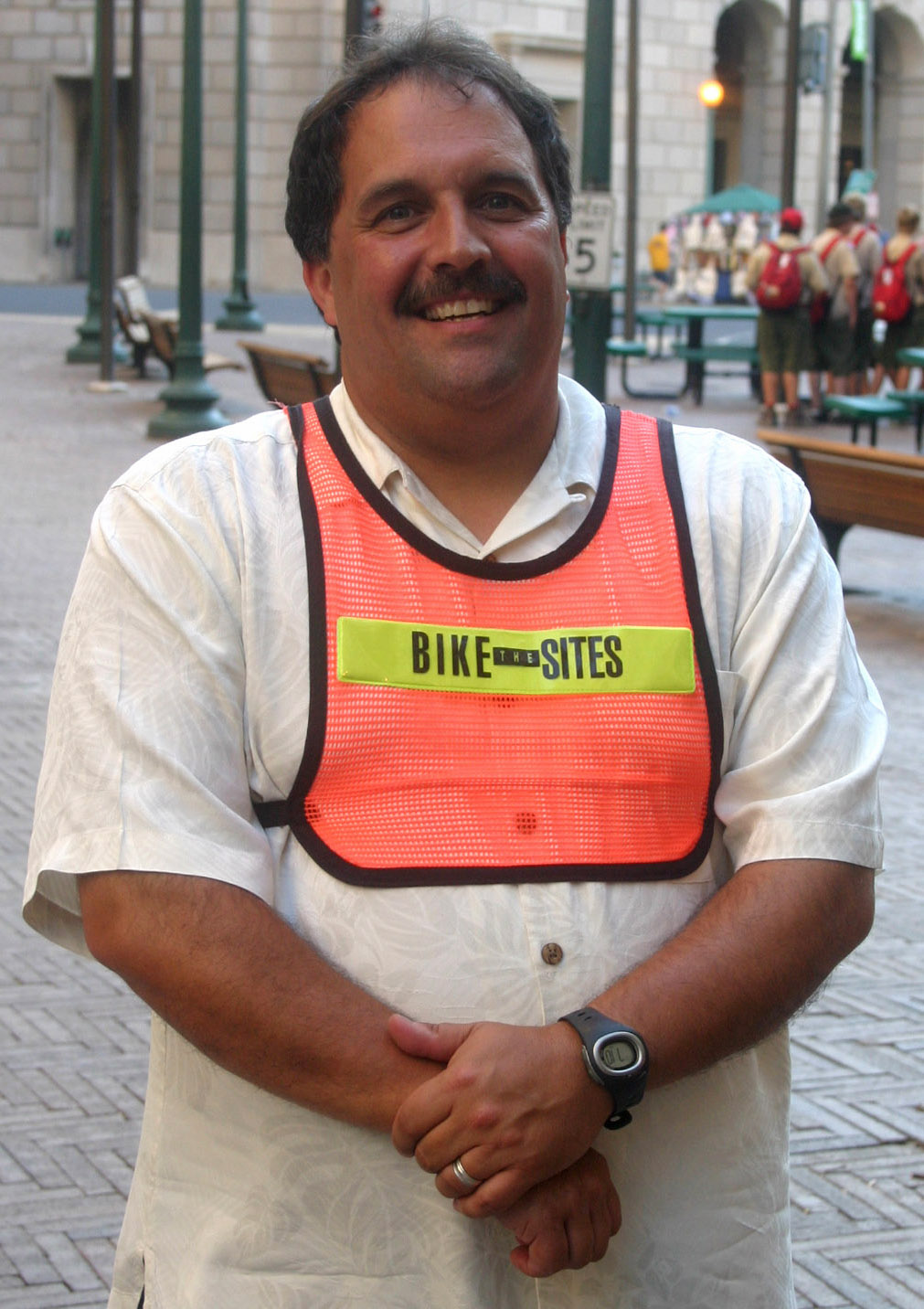
Stan Van Gundy coached the Heat to the Conference Finals in 2005.

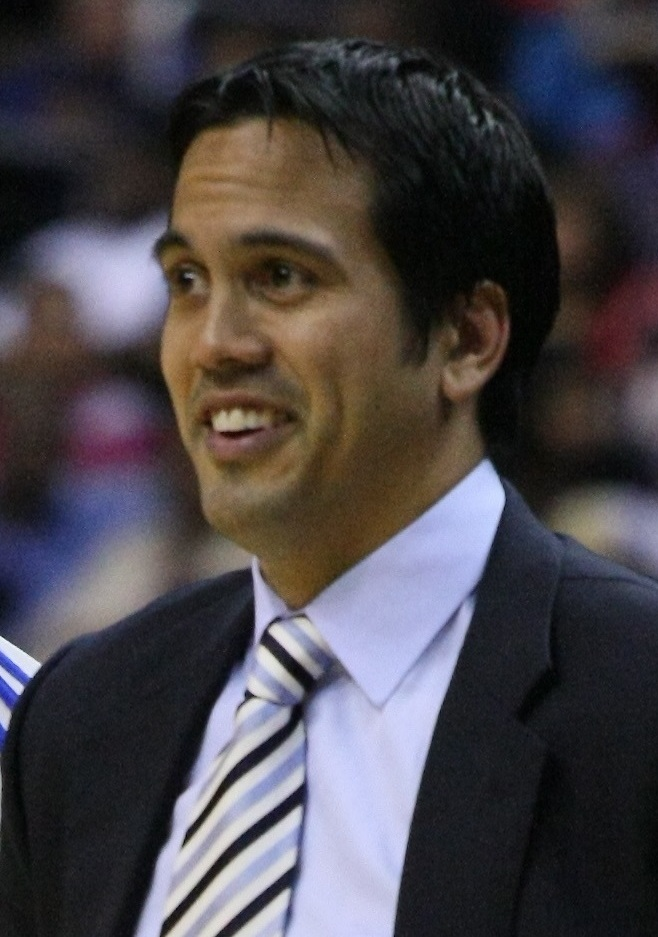
Erik Spoelstra coached the Heat to two NBA championships in 2012 and 2013, as well as Conference Championships in 2011, 2014, 2020, and 2023.

== Notes ==
- ^{a} A running total of the number of coaches of the Heat. Thus, any coach who has two or more separate terms as head coach is only counted once.
- ^{b} Each year is linked to an article about that particular NBA season.
