= Anchorage Northern Knights =

- Leagues: EBA (1977–78); CBA (1978–1982)
- Founded: 1977
- Folded: 1982
- History: Anchorage Northern Knights (1977–1982)
- Arena: West Anchorage High School Gymnasium
- Team colors: purple, gold
- Championships: 1 1980
- Division titles: 2 1979, 1980

The Anchorage Northern Knights were a professional basketball team based in Anchorage, Alaska from 1977 to 1982. The team played in the Eastern Basketball Association (EBA) during the 1977–78 season. The next season, the league changed its name to the Continental Basketball Association (CBA). The Northern Knights were their division champions two years in a row (1979–1980) and won the 1980 CBA Finals. Throughout their history, the Northern Knights played their home games at West Anchorage High School Gymnasium.

== History ==
When the Northern Knights joined the league, then known as the Eastern Basketball Association (EBA), it attracted national attention for being perhaps the most misplaced franchise in the history of professional sports. Playing in Anchorage, Alaska, the team was 5,000 miles away from its nearest competitor, as all the other teams were based in the eastern Pennsylvania–New York–New Jersey area. League officials "began to see the publicity value a team in Alaska would have for the EBA, which, with an enlarged talent pool since the ABA folded, had been trying to upgrade its image from that of a nickel-and-dime Pennsylvania mill-town circuit—which is mostly what it had been—to something on the order of baseball's Triple-A leagues," John Papnek in Sports Illustrated.

During the team's first two seasons, the Knights began their regular schedule with an extended homestand; then endured a mid-season bus trip to every CBA team in the league; then finished out the season with another homestand. The Northern Knights had the longest recorded road trip in professional sports history during the 1979–1980 season as the team traveled by bus around the contiguous United States—playing 16 games in 31 days.

The Knights experienced success in the 1977–78 season, leading the league in attendance and often playing before big crowds, although they never did sell out their home venue. They won the Western Division with a 24–7 record in 1977-78. The team advanced to the CBA Finals the following year, where they were swept in four games by the Rochester Zeniths, with whom they had begun to develop an impassioned rivalry. In 1979-80, the Northern Knights captured the CBA Championship by defeating Rochester in seven games. It was the first professional sports championship won by an Alaskan team.

Brad Davis played for the Northern Knights in the 1978–79 and 1979–80 seasons, capturing the CBA Newcomer of the Year Award in 1978–79. Davis then embarked on a long NBA career, highlighted by twelve seasons with the NBA's Dallas Mavericks, where he became the first player to have his jersey number retired by the NBA franchise. Ron Davis was a two-time CBA scoring leader; in 1979–80, he was CBA Most Valuable Player for the Anchorage squad.

Notable Northern Knights players included Freeman Blade, Tico Brown, Steve Hawes, Arvid Kramer, Steve Hayes, Brad Branson, and Al Fleming. The Knights were coached by Bill Klucas, who won the 1980 CBA Coach of the Year award. Tom Miller served as the Northern Knights play-by-play commentator.

The demise of the team came with the very nature of their expenses, as the team never turned a profit; in addition, attendance and interest began to dip badly, as the novelty of the Alaskan team playing in an Eastern Seaboard-focused league began to wear off with both fans and with the league, as by then it had begun to expand nationwide. The first two seasons saw the team pay for air fare for teams to fly out to Anchorage. The next three seasons saw a share of travel costs, but in 1982, the owners wanted to push that out, which led to a vote for the Knights to pay for all travel from Seattle to Anchorage. The success of the vote, combined with the arrest of an owner for a pyramid scheme, led to the disbanding of the team from the league.

== Season-by-season standings ==
Key

GP	Cumulative Games Played
W	Cumulative season wins
L	Cumulative season losses
Win%	Season winning percentage
GB	Games behind in the season standings
QW	Quarters won
Pnts	Season standings points
—	Not applicable

Table

Season	GP	W	L	Win%	GB	QW	Pnts	Place	Division	Playoffs	Head coach
1977–78	31	24	7	.774	—	—	—	1^{st}	Western	Semifinals: Lost to the Lancaster Red Roses, 3–2	Bill Klucas
1978–79	49	27	22	.595	2	—	—	2^{nd}	Northern	Won CBA Semifinals 3–1 Vs the Wilkes-Barre Barons, Lost CBA Finals 4–0 Vs Rochester Zeniths	Bill Klucas
1979–80	45	29	16	.644	1.5	—	—	2^{nd}	Northern	Won CBA Semifinals: Defeated the Hawaii Volcanos, 3–1, Won CBA Championship 4–3 Vs Rochester Zeniths	Bill Klucas
1980–81	42	25	17	.595	2	—	—	2^{nd}	Western	Semifinals: Lost to the Billings Volcanos, 2–1	Bill Klucas
1981–82	46	14	32	.304	—	72	114	4^{th}	Western	—	Freeman Blade (6–13)
1981–82	46	14	32	.304	—	72	114	4^{th}	Western	—	Clair Markey (8–19)

== All-time roster ==
- Nate Barnett
- Norton Barnhill
- Greg Bell
- Freeman Blade
- Brad Branson
- Tico Brown
- Roger Burkman
- James Cornelious
- Brad Davis
- Harry Davis
- Melvin Davis
- Ron Davis
- Paul Dawkins
- Craig Finberg
- Pat Flanigin
- Al Fleming
- Lucious Foster
- Tony Fuller
- Curt Gilstrap
- Jerome Gladney
- James Hardy
- Herman Harris
- Steve Hayes
- Tony Jackson
- Roy Jones
- Clarence Kea
- Andre Keys
- Rob King
- Larry Knight
- Arvid Kramer
- Edmund Lawrence
- Rickey Lee
- Jim Perryman
- Keith McCord
- Dick Miller
- Purvis Miller
- Charles Mitchell
- Ron Moore
- Alex Oliveira
- Stan Pietkiewicz
- John Ramsay
- Clarence Ruffen
- John Smith
- Dean Tolson
- Tony Turner
- Jeff Tyson
- Bernard Vaughan
- Slick Watts
- Dave Wear
- Tom Wheeler
- Connie White
- Rudy White
