= Billings Volcanos =

- League: CBA
- Established: 1979
- Folded: 1983
- History: Hawaii Volcanos (1979–1980); Billings Volcanos (1980–1983)
- Arena: Yellowstone MetraPark
- Location: Billings, Montana
- Team colors: orange, yellow, black
- Division titles: 1982

The Billings Volcanos were an American basketball team based in Billings, Montana that was a member of the Continental Basketball Association (CBA). From 1979 to 1980, they were called the Hawaii Volcanos.

== Hawaii Volcanos ==
The franchise began as the Hawaii Volcanos in 1979, and placed in the CBA's North Division with the Anchorage Northern Knights, Rochester Zeniths and Maine Lumberjacks. They played the 1979–80 season at several venues, including the Neal Blaisdell Center in Honolulu, the Conroy Bowl at Schofield Barracks, the gymnasium at Kaimuki High School, and two games at the Hilo Civic Auditorium.

Led by former Wichita State star Bobby Wilson with 28.3 points per game, the Volcanos managed a 20–25 record: a fourth-place finish, but good enough to qualify for the conference finals against Anchorage. Due to the tremendous travel costs between the nation's 49th and 50th states, however, the Volcanos agreed to play the entire series in Anchorage (which, ironically, was actually the closest CBA city to Hawaii, at about 2,700 miles away). After Hawaii won two of the first three games, the Knights stormed back to take the next two and the best-of-five series (Anchorage would go on to win a seven-game final against Rochester to take the CBA crown). With attendance disappointing and travel costs very high—most of their opponents were over 5,000 miles from Hawaii—the Volcanos shifted to Billings, Montana, for the 1980–81 campaign.

== Move to Montana ==
Shifting their home games to the Yellowstone MetraPark in Billings, the Volcanos finished third in the Western Division with a 23–19 mark, then got revenge on Anchorage by knocking them off, two games to one, in the first round of the playoffs; they then succumbed to their in-state rival, the Montana Golden Nuggets, three games to one. Wilson again led the Volcanos in scoring with 28.8 points per game.

In 1981–82, Billings won the West with a 32–14 record, topped Montana in the Western finals, three games to one, before losing to the Lancaster Lightning, four games to one, in the CBA finals; Marlon Redmond was Billings' top scorer with 25.5 points per game.

In 1982–83, Carl Nicks (who had played with Larry Bird on the Indiana State team that went all the way to the 1979 NCAA championship game) signed with the Volcanos after being released by the Utah Jazz. Despite Nicks's 26.2 points per game, Billings slipped to 20–24, third in the West, and missed the playoffs. The franchise disbanded over the summer.

== Year-by-year ==
Year	League	Reg. season	Playoffs
1979–80	CBA	4th, Northern	Conference Finals
1980–81	CBA	3rd, Western	Western Division Finals
1981–82	CBA	1st, Western	Finals
1982–83	CBA	3rd, Western	Did not qualify
