= Rochester Zeniths (basketball) =

- Leagues: AABA (1978); CBA (1978–1983)
- Founded: 1977; 49 years ago
- Folded: 1983; 43 years ago
- Arena: Dome Arena (capacity 4,086); Rochester War Memorial (capacity 7,200)
- Location: Rochester, New York
- Team colors: blue, gold, white
- Head coach: Mauro Panaggio
- Championships: 2 1979, 1981
- Division titles: 4 1979, 1980, 1981, 1983

The Rochester Zeniths were a professional basketball team in the Continental Basketball Association (CBA). They played in Henrietta, New York, a suburb of Rochester at the Dome Arena and in downtown Rochester, New York, at (what is now known as) the Blue Cross Arena at the War Memorial. They existed for six basketball seasons, winning two league titles and generally had great success on the basketball court before they disbanded after the 1982/83 season.

== Pro-basketball in Rochester before the Zeniths ==
The Rochester Centrals were a charter member of the original American Basketball League, the first attempt to form a major professional basketball league in the United States. The Centrals competed in the ABL from 1925 through the 1930-31 season, playing home games at the Naval Militia Armory in Rochester.

The Rochester Royals played in the National Basketball League and the National Basketball Association from 1945–46 through the 1956-57 season before moving to Cincinnati. They played their home games at the Edgerton Park Sports Arena and later the Rochester War Memorial in the city of Rochester. They enjoyed success at the turnstiles and on the basketball court, winning the NBA title in 1951 and finishing as runner-up in the NBL in 1947 and 1948. Their move to Cincinnati in the summer of 1957 was part of the general franchise relocation process of the 1950s and 1960s in the NBA which saw these older smaller markets abandoned in favor of larger markets with larger arenas.

In the summer of 1958, a group of Buffalo businessmen announced that they were creating a team called the Rochester Colonels to begin play in the fall of that year in the Pennsylvania-based Eastern Professional Basketball League. The team was intended to fill the void created when the Royals left town. Former Rochester Royals great Arnie Risen was recruited to join and coach the team to pique fan interest. The Colonels also featured former Royal Dick Ricketts and future Hall of Famer Hubie Brown. It was all for naught as the team went 0-8 and folded in December 1958, playing just two home games before modest crowds at the Rochester Community War Memorial.

Beginning in the 1959–60 season, the Syracuse Nationals of the NBA began playing regular season games in Rochester. During the 1959–60 and the 1960-61 seasons they played two games in Rochester and during the 1961–62 and 1962-63 seasons they played four games in Rochester (as well as playing a number of games in Utica, New York, during the same period). These "neutral site" games were common during this period of the NBA (for instance, Wilt Chamberlain's historic 100 point performance occurred in Hershey, Pennsylvania, then a semi-regular site for NBA games) but they were not particularly well attended and definitely not popular with the players and coaches as they added more travel to the schedule. The Syracuse Nationals became the Philadelphia 76ers after the 1962–63 season ended (when the Philadelphia Warriors moved to San Francisco) and regular season NBA games ended in Rochester as well.

During the 1970–71 season the expansion Buffalo Braves of the NBA played two regular season games in Rochester (as well as two in Syracuse) in an effort to build Western New York interest in the nascent franchise. The Braves were not a very good team and the games were not as successful at the gate as the team hoped and the Braves did not return the next season. The Braves were bucking the south and west trend of NBA franchise movement and the hope was their large market, large arena and fan interest in nearby NBA abandoned cities (they played fifteen games in Toronto during the 1973–74 and 1974-75 season in an effort to regionalize into Canada) would be enough to make the team successful. The Braves played their last game in Buffalo as the Braves in April 1978 and the club moved to Southern California to become the San Diego (and later, Los Angeles) Clippers. Not many fans frequently made the 70-mile trip from Rochester to Buffalo to see the Braves play as, for the most part, they were not a competitive team.

The move of the Braves out of Buffalo coincided with rise of another professional, albeit minor league team in Rochester known as the Zeniths.

== History ==
The Rochester Zeniths were organized in the fall of 1977 to play professional basketball in the newly formed All-American Basketball Alliance by Tom Ficara, originator of the league. They were owned by Dick Hill who owned Hill TV, a Rochester electronics store that sold Zenith brand televisions, hence the nickname Zeniths Hill also initially owned the Rochester Zeniths professional softball team that played in two different men's professional softball leagues in the Rochester area starting in 1978. The softball team changed its name in 1980 to the Rochester Express after Hill sold the team. The Zeniths basketball team began play in January 1978 along with the rest of the All-American Alliance, but the league folded within a month. The Zeniths played 11 games and finished with a 10-1 record. Attendance at home games at the War Memorial was by far the best in the league.

For the 1978–79 basketball season, the Zeniths joined the newly renamed Continental Basketball Association (formerly the Eastern Basketball League) and played most of their home games at the Dome Arena at the Monroe County Fairgrounds in Henrietta, New York. The Dome Arena was built primarily as an exposition hall for the annual county fair, as well as business shows and conventions. It was not particularly well suited for basketball; for one thing, it did not have a hardwood floor. Instead, the Dome bought a green basketball carpet from a Swedish firm and used that for Zeniths games. While not popular with players or fans, the carpet met with the league's approval, despite the odd muffled sound made every time a player dribbled the ball. (The War Memorial had a standard hardwood basketball floor.)

The Zeniths were coached by local product Mauro Panaggio, a successful Division III basketball coach at SUNY Brockport, and featured many former prominent Western New York college basketball players, most notably guard Glenn Hagan from St. Bonaventure and forward Larry Fogle from Canisius College (both had been second-round NBA Draft picks). The team played a very fast, uptempo style that was the prevailing trend in the CBA at the time. They were the dominant team in the league that year, finishing 36-12 and winning the Northern Division title by nine and a half games over the Anchorage Northern Knights. In the playoffs, they lost only once, beating the Allentown Jets three games to one and then sweeping the Knights in the finals. Star guard Andre McCarter was named both Newcomer of the Year and Most Valuable Player for the season. Panaggio was named league Coach of the Year.

Also of note was the Zeniths' hosting of the 1979 CBA All-Star game at the Dome Arena, as Rochester took on a team of all-stars from the rest of the league. When a blizzard knocked out electric power in the city and the arena just after the first half ended, an impromptu slam dunk competition (won by Billy Ray Bates of the Maine Lumberjacks) was conducted using the building's emergency lighting. Power was not restored and fans were sent home. The next night, however, the game resumed, and rather than just play the remaining two quarters, league commissioner Jim Drucker decided to play another four quarters – making the six-quarter, 72-minute game the longest contest in pro basketball history. McCarter was named the game's Most Valuable Player as the Z's won, 182-168, in front of announced crowd of 1,724.

The Zeniths were again the top team in the CBA in 1979-80 but only won the division over Anchorage by a game and a half, then lost a hard-fought finals rematch with the Knights in seven games./ For this season, the Zeniths were coached by co-owner and nightclub proprietor Art Stock, who bought a stake in the team after his Jersey Shore Bullets folded the previous season. Mauro Panaggio moved to the front office as General Manager, but resumed his duties as head coach for the 1980-81 season until the demise of the team in 1983.

The 1980-81 campaign was the high water mark for the Zeniths franchise as they ran away with the Eastern Division title at 34-6 and once again took the league title while only losing one game in the playoffs, sweeping the Lehigh Valley Jets in two straight, beating Philadelphia two games to one and sweeping the Montana Golden Nuggets coached by George Karl in four straight games.

In their final two season in Rochester, the Zeniths had back-to-back winning seasons but lost was bounced in the first round of the playoffs each year. By this time, all games had been moved to the War Memorial, but attendance was on the decline. Faced with mounting financial losses, the team disbanded following the 1982-83 season. Panaggio went on to continue his success in the CBA, and retired as the winningest coach in league history. He died in 2018.

== Legacy ==
Mauro Panaggio's son, Dan Panaggio went into coaching and served as the head coach of the Los Angeles D-Fenders of the NBA Development League after following in his father's footsteps and coaching the Quad City Thunder of the Continental Basketball Association to two league titles in 1994 and 1998.

After many false starts, professional basketball returned to Rochester in the form of an American Basketball Association (21st century) franchise known as the Rochester RazorSharks. The RazorSharks began play in the ABA in November 2005, and won the ABA Championship in their inaugural season. In 2008, the team left the ABA to become a charter member of the Premier Basketball League. The Razorsharks won the first PBL Championship.

== All-time roster ==
- Wayne Abrams
- Jerry Baskerville
- Jim Baron
- Lawrence Boston
- Norman Bounds
- Jim Bradley
- Ed Brown
- Mike Buescher
- Marty Byrnes
- Dan Callandrillo
- Clint Chapman
- Tim Claxton
- Kevin Cluess
- Harry Davis
- Ernie Douse
- David DuPree
- Dave Everett
- Larry Fogle
- Ken Garrett
- Mike Gibson
- Ernie Graham
- Ken Green
- Glenn Hagan
- Larry Harris
- Jerome Henderson
- Essie Hollis
- Larry Holmes
- Don Johnson
- Harold Johnson
- Lee Johnson
- Ron Jones
- Larry Lawrence
- Al Leslie
- Andre McCarter
- Larry McNeill
- Monroe McTaw
- Randy Owens
- Jim Panaggio
- Mike Panaggio
- Derrick Rowland
- Larry Spriggs
- Al Smith
- Willie Smith
- Bill Terry
- Dean Tolson
- Gordon Turner
- Nick Urzetta
- Tim Waterman
- Terry White
- James Williams
- Sam Worthen
- Paul Zaretsky

== Season-by-season records ==
Year	GP	W	L	Pct	GA/GB	Finish	Playoffs
1977-78 AABA	11	10	1	.909	3.5	1st, Northern Division	league disbanded
1978-79 CBA	48	36	12	.750	9.5	1st, Northern Division	CBA Champions
1979-80 CBA	46	31	15	.674	1.5	1st, Northern Division	Lost in Finals
1980-81 CBA	40	34	6	.850	12	1st, Eastern Division	CBA Champions
1981-82 CBA	46	29	17	.630	5	2nd, Eastern Division	Lost in first round
1982-83 CBA	44	29	15	.659	*	1st, Eastern Division	Lost in first round

== Awards and accolades ==
- Andre McCarter, 1978-79 CBA Newcomer of the Year, 1979 All-Star Game MVP, 1978-79 CBA Most Valuable Player
- Glenn Hagan, named to the CBA Era 50th Anniversary team
- Larry Fogle, 1978-79 CBA Playoffs Co-MVP
- Larry Spriggs, 1981-82 CBA Rookie of the Year
- Larry McNeill, 1978-79 CBA Playoffs Co-MVP
- Lee Johnson, 1980-81 CBA Playoffs MVP, 1980-81 CBA Rookie of the Year
