= Maine Lumberjacks =

American minor league basketball team

- Leagues: CBA
- Founded: 1978
- Folded: 1995
- History: Maine Lumberjacks (1978–1983); Bay State Bombardiers (1983–1986); Pensacola Tornados (1986–1991); Birmingham Bandits (1991–1992); Rochester Renegade (1992–1994); Harrisburg Hammerheads (1994–1995)
- Location: Bangor, Maine
- Team colors: green, black
- Ownership: Morrill Worcester

Maine Lumberjacks were an American minor league basketball team formed as an expansion team in 1978. The franchise played 17 seasons in the Continental Basketball Association (CBA), calling six different cities home. The team was originally based in Bangor, Maine.

== History ==
=== Bay State Bombardiers (1983-86) ===
After five seasons in Bangor the team was relocated to Brockton, Massachusetts and were renamed the Bay State Bombardiers. After one season in Brockton, the Bombardiers moved their home games to Worcester, Mass., and the Worcester Auditorium. The 1985–86 season was the most successful in franchise history, going 30-18 (third-best in the CBA) during the regular season. The Bombardiers eliminated the Baltimore Lightning in the first round of the playoffs but fell to eventual champion Tampa Bay Thrillers in the Eastern Division Finals.

=== Pensacola Tornados (1986-91) ===
Three seasons in Massachusetts were followed by a relocation to Pensacola, Florida for the 1986–87 season. The team was renamed Pensacola Tornados, the second CBA team to use the name.

=== Birmingham Bandits (1991-92) ===
Another relocation and name change came before the 1991–92 season, this time to Birmingham, Alabama. The team was known as the Birmingham Bandits for just one season before team owner Bob McMillan moved the team again.

=== Rochester Renegade (1992-94) ===
Rochester, Minnesota was the next home of the franchise, now renamed the Rochester Renegade. The first year was the worst in franchise and CBA history, winning just six games. The off-season saw the hiring of Bill Musselman as head coach, leading the Renegades to a 31–25 record. Ronnie Granderson was named league MVP.

=== Harrisburg Hammerheads (1994-95) ===
After two seasons in southeast Minnesota the team was sold and relocated for the fifth and final time. The Harrisburg Hammerheads played 33 of 56 regular season games during the 1994–95 season before the CBA terminated the franchise for failure to keep financial commitments.

Amongst other noteworthy points was responsible for the drafting of Billy Ray Bates into the NBA.

== Season-by-season ==
Season	Gp	W	L	Pct.	Regular season	CBA Playoffs
1978–79	47	17	30	.362	4th - Northern Division	Did Not Qualify
1979–80	44	21	23	.477	3rd - Northern Division	Defeated Leigh Valley Jets 2–0 Lost to Rochester Zeniths 2–0
1980–81	40	16	24	.400	5th - Northern Division	DNQ
1981–82	46	18	28	.391	3rd - Northern Division	DNQ
1982–83	44	22	22	.500	3rd - Northern Division	DNQ
1983–84	44	22	22	.500	3rd - Eastern Division	Lost to Albany Patroons 3–2
1984–85	48	28	20	.583	6th - Eastern Division	DNQ
1985–86	48	30	18	.625	2nd - Eastern Division	Defeated Baltimore Lightning 4–2 Lost to Tampa Bay Thrillers 4–1
1986–87	48	20	28	.417	3rd - Eastern Division	Lost to Rapid City Thrillers 4–1
1987–88	54	28	26	.519	2nd - Eastern Division	Defeated Mississippi Jets 4–1 Lost to Albany Patroons 4–0
1988–89	54	30	24	.556	3rd - Eastern Division	Lost to Tulsa Fast Breakers 4–1
1989–90	56	32	24	.571	2nd - Eastern Division	Defeated Grand Rapids Hoops 2–1 Lost to Albany Patroons 3–2
1990–91	56	27	29	.482	3rd - Eastern Division	DNQ
1991–92	56	25	31	.446	2nd - Eastern Division	Defeated Albany Patroons 131–122 Lost to Quad City Thunder 3–1
1992–93	56	6	50	.107	4th - Mideast Division	DNQ
1993–94	56	31	25	.554	4th - Mideast Division	DNQ
1994–95	33	15	18	.455	DNF	Did not finish regular season
TOTALS	830	388	442	.468		

== Notable players ==
- Joe Dawson (born 1960), American-Israeli basketball player, 1992 Israeli Basketball Premier League MVP
- Mike Largey (born 1960), basketball player in the Israeli Basketball Premier League
- Randy Owens (1959–2015), American basketball player
- James Terry (born 1960), American-Israeli basketball player
- Jerry Sichting (born 1956), 10-year NBA veteran; long-time NBA coach
