= List of Charlotte Hornets head coaches =

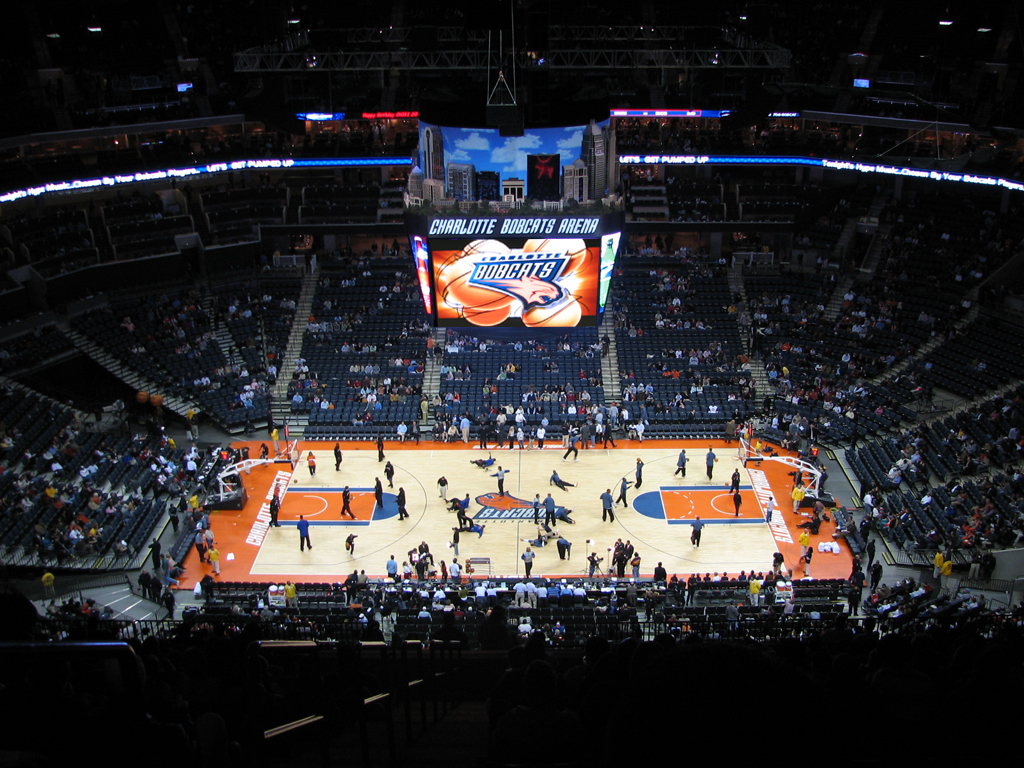
The Hornets have played their home games at the Spectrum Center since 2005.

The Charlotte Hornets are an American professional basketball team based in Charlotte, North Carolina. They play in the Southeast Division of the Eastern Conference in the National Basketball Association (NBA). The Hornets began playing in 1988 as an expansion team, before relocating to New Orleans in 2002 and renaming themselves as the Pelicans in 2013. Charlotte was then awarded a new expansion team named the Bobcats in 2004, which reassumed the Hornets name in 2014. In a deal with the NBA and Pelicans, the renamed Hornets also reclaimed the history and records of the original Hornets from 1988 to 2002, while all of the original Hornets' records from 2002 to 2013 will remain with the Pelicans.

The Hornets franchise have played their home games at the Spectrum Center, formerly known as the Charlotte Bobcats Arena and the Time Warner Cable Arena, since 2005. The Hornets were owned by Michael Jordan, but are now owned by Gabe Plotkin & Rick Schnall, with Jordan retaining a minority stake.

There have been 10 head coaches for the Hornets franchise. The franchise's first head coach was Dick Harter, who coached for two seasons. Allan Bristow and Steve Clifford are the franchise's all-time leader for the most regular-season games coached (410); Bristow is also the franchise's all-time leader for the most regular-season game wins (207); Dave Cowens is the franchise's all-time leader for the highest winning percentage in the regular season (.609); Paul Silas is the franchise's all-time leader for the most playoff games coached (23), and the most playoff-game wins (11). Harter, Bristow, Sam Vincent and Mike Dunlap have spent their entire NBA coaching careers with the Hornets franchise. Larry Brown is the only coach of the franchise to have been elected into the Basketball Hall of Fame as a coach. The previous head coach of the Hornets was Steve Clifford, who returned and coached two seasons as head coach. The current head coach of the Hornets is Charles Lee, who was hired by the Hornets on May 9, 2024.

== Key ==
GC	Games coached
W	Wins
L	Losses
Win%	Winning percentage
#	Number of coaches^{[a]}
*	Spent entire NBA head coaching career with the Hornets
†	Elected into the Basketball Hall of Fame as a coach

== Coaches ==
Note: Statistics are correct through the end of the 2025–26 season.

#	Name	Term^{[b]}	GC	W	L	Win%	GC	W	L	Win%	Achievements	Reference
#	Name	Term^{[b]}	Regular season				Playoffs				Achievements	Reference
Charlotte Hornets
1	Dick Harter*	1988–1990	122	28	94	.230	0	0	0	–		
2	Gene Littles	1990–1991	124	37	87	.298	0	0	0	–		
3	Allan Bristow*	1991–1996	410	207	203	.505	13	5	8	.385		
4	Dave Cowens	1996–1999	179	109	70	.609	12	4	8	.333		
5	Paul Silas^{[c]}	1999–2002	281	161	120	.573	23	11	12	.478		
Charlotte Bobcats
6	Bernie Bickerstaff	2004–2007	246	77	169	.313	0	0	0	–		
7	Sam Vincent*	2007–2008	82	32	50	.390	0	0	0	–		
8	Larry Brown†	2008–2010	192	88	104	.458	4	0	4	.000		
—	Paul Silas^{[c]}	2010–2012	120	32	88	.267	0	0	0	–		
9	Mike Dunlap*	2012–2013	82	21	61	.256	0	0	0	–		
10	Steve Clifford	2013–2014	82	43	39	.524	4	0	4	.000		
Charlotte Hornets
—	Steve Clifford	2014–2018	328	153	175	.466	7	3	4	.429		
11	James Borrego	2018–2022	301	138	163	.458	0	0	0	–		
—	Steve Clifford	2022–2024	164	48	116	.293	—	—	—	–		
12	Charles Lee	2024–present	164	63	101	.384	—	—	—	–		

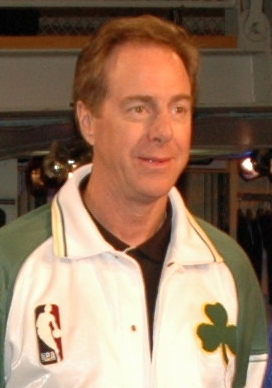
Dave Cowens coached the Hornets for three seasons from 1996 to 1999.

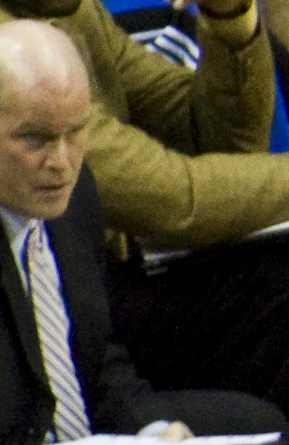
Steve Clifford is the longest-serving head coach from 2013 to 2018 and from 2022 to 2024.

== Notes ==
- ^{a} A running total of the number of coaches of the Bobcats/Hornets. Thus, any coach who has two or more separate terms as head coach is only counted once.
- ^{b} Each year is linked to an article about that particular NBA season.
- ^{c} Paul Silas has a combined total of 401 regular season games coached, with a W–L record of 193–208, for a .481 winning percentage during his non-consecutive tenures in Charlotte.

== Franchise leaders ==
All-time leaders – as of the end of the 2021–22 NBA season. Bold denotes active coach with the team.

=== Most games coached ===
1. Steve Clifford – 574
2. Allan Bristow – 410
3. Paul Silas – 401
4. James Borrego – 301
5. Bernie Bickerstaff – 246

=== Most wins coached ===
1. Steve Clifford – 244
2. Allan Bristow – 207
3. Paul Silas – 193
4. James Borrego – 138
5. Dave Cowens – 109

=== Best winning % ===
1. Dave Cowens – .609
2. Allan Bristow – .505
3. Paul Silas – .481
4. Larry Brown – .458
5. Steve Clifford – .425

=== Most playoff games coached ===
1. Paul Silas – 23
2. Allan Bristow – 13
3. Dave Cowens – 12
4. Steve Clifford – 11
5. Larry Brown – 4

=== Most playoff wins coached ===
1. Paul Silas – 11
2. Allan Bristow – 5
3. Dave Cowens – 4
4. Steve Clifford – 3

=== Best playoff winning % ===
1. Paul Silas – .478
2. Allan Bristow – .385
3. Dave Cowens – .333
4. Steve Clifford – .273
