= Continental Basketball Association award winners and alumni =

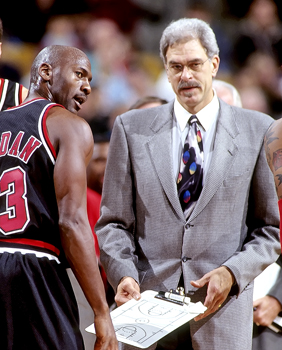
Phil Jackson (pictured right) was the head coach of the CBA Albany Patroons before joining the NBA Chicago Bulls as an assistant coach in 1987. Jackson won six NBA Finals as the Bulls' head coach.

The Continental Basketball Association was a men's professional basketball league that existed from 1946 to 2009. The league was formerly known as the Eastern Pennsylvania Basketball League, the Eastern Professional Basketball League and the Eastern Basketball Association. There were several annual awards in the CBA including the Player of the Year Award, the Rookie of the Year Award, the Coach of the Year Award, the Defensive Player of the Year Award and the Newcomer of the Year Award.

== CBA 50^{th} Anniversary Team ==
=== EPBL/EBA era team (1946–1978) ===
- Stacey Arceneaux — forward
- Bill Chanecka — forward
- Charlie Criss — guard
- Tom Hemans — forward
- Hal Lear — guard
- Julius McCoy — forward
- Stan Novak — coach
- Roman Turmon — center
- Ken Wilburn — center

=== CBA era team (1978–1996) ===
- Vincent Askew — forward
- Tico Brown — guard
- Don Collins — forward
- Ron Davis — forward
- Claude Gregory — center
- Glenn Hagan — guard
- Charles Jones — center
- Mauro Panaggio — coach
- Derrick Rowland — forward
- Robert Smith — guard
- Clinton Wheeler — guard

== CBA players who played at least 82 NBA games ==
- Alaa Abdelnaby
- Vincent Askew
- Chucky Atkins
- Isaac Austin
- Anthony Avent
- Greg Ballard
- Ken Bannister
- Stephen Bardo
- Maceo Baston
- Kenny Battle
- Corey Beck
- Raja Bell
- Mel Bennett
- Lance Blanks
- Manute Bol
- Walter Bond
- Bruce Bowen
- Anthony Bowie
- Earl Boykins
- Charles Bradley
- Dudley Bradley
- Tim Breaux
- Jim Brogan
- Kevin Brooks
- Michael Brooks
- Scott Brooks
- Rick Brunson
- Tony Brown
- Willie Burton
- Steve Burtt Sr.
- Mitchell Butler
- Marty Byrnes
- Adrian Caldwell
- Rick Carlisle
- Derrick Chievous
- Chris Childs
- Don Collins
- Steve Colter
- Darwin Cook
- Hollis Copeland
- Joe Courtney
- Charlie Criss
- Michael Curry
- Lloyd Daniels
- Emanual Davis
- Todd Day
- Greg Dreiling
- John Drew
- Richard Dumas
- Ledell Eackles
- Mario Elie
- Harold Ellis
- LeRon Ellis
- Chris Engler
- Jim Farmer
- Jamie Feick
- Eric Fernsten
- Duane Ferrell
- Rod Foster
- World B. Free
- Kevin Gamble
- Kenny Gattison
- Tate George
- George Gervin
- Gerald Glass
- Anthony Goldwire
- Grant Gondrezick
- Pétur Guðmundsson
- Joe Graboski
- Paul Graham
- Ronnie Grandison
- Greg Grant
- Jeff Grayer
- Litterial Green
- Rickey Green
- Adrian Griffin
- Darrin Hancock
- Junior Harrington
- Conner Henry
- Steve Henson
- Kenny Higgs
- Craig Hodges
- Tom Hoover
- Byron Houston
- Stephen Howard
- Eddie Hughes
- Byron Irvin
- Jaren Jackson
- Stephen Jackson
- Henry James
- Andy Johnson
- Anthony Jones
- Eddie Jordan
- Reggie Jordan
- Larry Kenon
- Randolph Keys
- Bo Kimble
- Albert King
- Chris King
- Gerard King
- Greg Kite
- Bart Kofoed
- Joe Kopicki
- Jerome Lane
- Rusty LaRue
- Tim Legler
- Voshon Lenard
- Jim Les
- Lewis Lloyd
- John Long
- Sidney Lowe
- Oliver Mack
- Sam Mack
- Mark Macon
- Donny Marshall
- Darrick Martin
- Jeff Martin
- Anthony Mason
- Wes Matthews
- Bob McCann
- Andre McCarter
- Amal McCaskill
- George McCloud
- Ben McDonald
- Jeff McInnis
- Kevin McKenna
- Chris McNealy
- Bob McNeill
- Larry McNeill
- Anthony Miller
- Oliver Miller
- Dirk Minniefield
- Paul Mokeski
- Jamario Moon
- Lowes Moore
- Mikki Moore
- Tracy Moore
- Tod Murphy
- Pete Myers
- Kenny Natt
- Ed Nealy
- Bob Netolicky
- Chuck Nevitt
- Ivano Newbill
- Carl Nicks
- Kurt Nimphius
- Moochie Norris
- Jawann Oldham
- Brian Oliver
- Kevin Ollie
- Doug Overton
- Gerald Paddio
- Anthony Parker
- Sam Pellom
- Elliot Perry
- Bobby Phills
- Stan Pietkiewicz
- Charles Pittman
- Gary Plummer
- Olden Polynice
- Mark Pope
- Kevin Pritchard
- Mark Radford
- Ed Rains
- Mark Randall
- Kelvin Ransey
- Eldridge Recasner
- Robert Reid
- Jerry Reynolds
- Micheal Ray Richardson
- David Rivers
- Anthony Roberts
- Alvin Robertson
- Cliff Robinson
- Larry Robinson
- Rumeal Robinson
- Lorenzo Romar
- Scott Roth
- Donald Royal
- Clifford Rozier
- Campy Russell
- Cazzie Russell
- Walker Russell
- Mike Sanders
- Steve Scheffler
- Shawnelle Scott
- Carey Scurry
- Charles Shackleford
- Reggie Slater
- Charles Smith
- Doug Smith
- LaBradford Smith
- Michael Smith
- Robert Smith
- Rory Sparrow
- Larry Spriggs
- Kevin Stacom
- Bud Stallworth
- Terence Stansbury
- John Starks
- Brook Steppe
- Larry Stewart
- Joe Strawder
- Erick Strickland
- Mark Strickland
- Derek Strong
- Greg Sutton
- Roy Tarpley
- Terry Teagle
- Carlos Terry
- David Thirdkill
- Jim Thomas
- John Thomas
- Bernard Thompson
- Darren Tillis
- Ray Tolbert
- Sedric Toney
- Raymond Townsend
- Andre Turner
- Elston Turner
- Kelvin Upshaw
- Ben Warley
- Bryan Warrick
- Pearl Washington
- Slick Watts
- Marvin Webster
- Mark West
- Ennis Whatley
- Clinton Wheeler
- Jo Jo White
- Rory White
- Mitchell Wiggins
- Morlon Wiley
- Eddie Lee Wilkins
- Jeff Wilkins
- Aaron Williams
- Freeman Williams
- Kevin Williams
- Micheal Williams
- Rob Williams
- Sam Williams
- John Williamson
- Bill Willoughby
- Othell Wilson
- Al Wood
- Leon Wood
- Haywoode Workman
- Danny Young

== CBA coaches who coached at least 82 NBA games ==
NBA Yrs	Number of years as head coach
CBA Yrs	Number of years as head or assistant coach
GC	Games coached
W	Wins
L	Losses
Win%	Winning percentage
*	Elected to the Naismith Memorial Basketball Hall of Fame as a coach

Coach	NBA yrs	CBA yrs	NBA				CBA				Ref.
Coach	NBA yrs	CBA yrs	GC	W	L	Win%	GC	W	L	Win%	Ref.
Jim Boylan	2007–08, 2012–13	1992–93	106	46	60	.434	—	—	—	—	
Maurice Cheeks	2001–09, 2013–14	1993–94	620	305	315	.420	—	—	—	—	
Dave Cowens	1978–79, 1996–2002	1984–85	352	161	191	.457	44	22	22	.500	
Bob Hill	1986–87, 1990–97, 2005–07	1988	603	310	293	.514	54	21	33	.389	
Phil Jackson*	1989–2011	1982–87	1,640	1,155	485	.704	232	125	107	.539	
Dave Joerger	2013–present	2000–06	246	147	99	.598	184	118	66	.641	
George Karl	1984–88, 1992–2003, 2005–2013, 2015–16	1980–83, 1988–1991	1,999	1,175	824	.588	298	217	81	.728	
Larry Krystkowiak	2006–08	2003–04	100	31	69	.310	53	37	16	.698	
Andrew Levane	1952–54, 1958–62	1961	276	106	170	.384	—	—	—	—	
Bill Musselman	1980–82, 1989–1991	1983–88, 1993–94	250	80	170	.320	327	224	103	.685	
Eric Musselman	2002–04, 2006–07	1989–1997	246	108	138	.439	392	270	122	.688	
Tom Nissalke	1971–1984	1986–87	879	371	508	.422	48	26	22	.542	
Flip Saunders	1995–2012	1988–1995	1,248	654	594	.524	390	253	137	.648	
Paul Seymour	1956–1966, 1968–69	1966–67	512	271	241	.529	28	21	7	.750	
Jerry Sloan*	1979–1982, 1988–2011	1984–85	2,024	1,221	803	.603	—	—	—	—	
Keith Smart	2002–03, 2010–13	1997–2000	263	93	107	.354	168	85	83	.506	
Terry Stotts	2002–07, 2012–2021	1990–92	611	297	314	.486	—	—	—	—	
Darrell Walker	1996–2000	1998–99	169	56	113	.331	56	23	33	.411	

== Coach of the year Award ==
Source:usbasket.com

Season	Winner	Team
1996-97	(United States) Mo McHone	Sioux Falls Skyforce
1997-98	(United States) Dan Panaggio	Quad City Thunder
1998-99	(United States) Tyler Jones	Connecticut Pride
1999-00	(United States) Dan Panaggio	Quad City Thunder
2000-01		
2001-02	(United States) Dave Joerger	Dakota Wizards
2002-03	(United States) Chris Daleo	Rockford Lightning
2003-04	(United States) Dave Joerger	Dakota Wizards
2004-05	(United States) Russ Bergman	Great Lakes Storm
2005-06	(United States) Jaren Jackson	Gary Steelheads
2006-07	(United States) Paul Woolpert	Yakama Sun Kings
2007-08	(United States) Paul Woolpert	Yakama Sun Kings

== CBA All-Star Game Most Valuable Player Award ==
- 1961 – Alex "Boo" Ellis, Wilkes-Barre Barons
- 1963 – Bobby McNeill, Camden Bullets
- 1964 – Jimmie Hadnot, Trenton Colonials
- 1965 – Bobby McNeill, Camden Bullets
- 1966 – Walt Simon, Allentown Jets
- 1967 – Willie Murrell, Scranton Miners
- 1968 – Willis "Spider" Bennett, Hartford Capitols
- 1969 – Jim Jackson, Scranton Miners
- 1970 – John Savage, Wilmington Blue Bombers
- 1971 – Willie Somerset, Scranton Apollos
- 1972 – Reggie Lacefield, Hartford Capitols
- 1977 – Jim Bostic, Jersey Shore Bullets
- 1978 – Jim Bostic, Jersey Shore Bullets
- 1979 – Andre McCarter, Rochester Zeniths
- 1982 – Brad Branson, Anchorage Northern Knights
- 1983 – Larry Spriggs, Albany Patroons
- 1984 – Anthony Roberts, Wyoming Wildcatters
- 1985 – Rick Lamb, Wyoming Wildcatters
- 1986 – Don Collins, Tampa Bay Thrillers
- 1987 – Eddie Johnson, Tampa Bay Thrillers
- 1988 – Michael Brooks, Albany Patroons
- 1989 – Dwayne McClain, Rockford Lightning
- 1990 – Conner Henry, Rapid City Thrillers
- 1991 – Vincent Askew, Albany Patroons
- 1992 – Conner Henry, Yakima Sun Kings
- 1993 – Pat Durham, Fargo-Moorhead Fever
- 1994 – Jeff Martin, Grand Rapids Hoops
- 1995 – Tony Dawson, Rockford Lightning
- 1996 – Shelton Jones, Florida Beachdogs
- 1997 – Dexter Boney, Florida Beachdogs
- 2000 – Dontae' Jones, LaCrosse Bobcats
- 2003 – Versile Shaw, Sioux Falls Skyforce
- 2004 – Roberto Bergersen, Idaho Stampede
- 2005 – Sam Clancy, Jr., Idaho Stampede
- 2006 – Randy Holcomb, Gary Steelheads
- 2007 – Ralph Holmes, Yakama Sun Kings
- 2008 – Odell Bradley, Butte Daredevils

== CBA draft first overall picks ==
Draft	Selected by	Player	Nationality	College/former club	PPG	RPG	APG	Ref.
1985	Kansas City Sizzlers	Regan Truesdale	United States	The Citadel	21.5	8.7	2.7	
1986	Jacksonville Jets	Jerry Stroman	United States	Utah	18.0	5.2	2.2	
1987	Quad City Thunder	Derrick Sanders	United States	Illinois State	15.8	8.1	0.8	
1988	Topeka Sizzlers	Lafester Rhodes	United States	Iowa State	22.5	7.2	2.3	
1989	San Jose Jammers	Mike Doktorczyk	United States	UC Irvine	15.9	7.8	2.1	
1990	Quad City Thunder	Ronald Draper	United States	American	16.1	12.2	2.0	
1991	Wichita Falls Texans	Robert Youngblood	United States	Southern	15.2	9.1	2.1	
1992	Grand Rapids Hoops	Rod Sellers	United States	UConn	12.3	8.7	1.4	
1993	Hartford Hellcats	Stacey Poole	United States	Florida	16.4	6.4	2.0	
1994	Yakima Sun Kings	Aaron Swinson	United States	Auburn	20.7	8.1	1.1	
1995	Omaha Racers	Fred Hoiberg	United States	Iowa State	19.9	5.6	2.2	
1996	Florida Beach Dogs	Carlos Strong	United States	Georgia	13.5	6.4	1.7	
1997	Rockford Lightning	Muntrelle Dobbins	United States	Arkansas–Little Rock	14.4	11.4	1.3	
1998	Grand Rapids Hoops	Saddi Washington	United States	Western Michigan	21.6	4.2	1.9	
1999	Quad City Thunder	Derek Hood	United States	Arkansas	12.4	10.3	1.8	
2000	Gary Steelheads	Ryan Blackwell	United States	Syracuse	10.8	7.2	3.1	
2002	Yakima Sun Kings	Elvin Mims	United States	Southern Miss	18.9	7.8	1.1	
2003	Sioux Falls Skyforce	Josh Powell	United States	NC State	12.4	5.3	1.0	
2004	Michigan Mayhem	Desmon Farmer	United States	USC	19.4	4.6	1.8	
2005	Albany Patroons	T. J. Thompson	United States	George Washington	13.6	2.0	2.9	
2006	Minot Skyrockets	Dayshawn Wright	United States	Syracuse	1.3	1.3	0.6	
2007	Oklahoma Cavalry	Caleb Green	United States	Oral Roberts	20.5	9.3	2.6	
2008	Albany Patroons	Michael Jenkins	United States	Winthrop	13.9	4.1	2.5	
