= Larry Hennessy =

American basketball player

Personal information
- Born: May 20, 1929 New Rochelle, New York, U.S.
- Died: August 20, 2008 (aged 79) Williamsburg, Virginia, U.S.
- Listed height: 6 ft 3 in (1.91 m)
- Listed weight: 185 lb (84 kg)

Career information
- High school: Blessed Sacrament (New Rochelle, New York)
- College: Villanova (1950–1953)
- NBA draft: 1953: territorial pick
- Drafted by: Philadelphia Warriors
- Playing career: 1955–1962
- Position: Shooting guard
- Number: 4, 15
- Coaching career: 1966–1967

Career history

Playing
- 1955–1956: Philadelphia Warriors
- 1956: Syracuse Nationals
- 1957–1959: Wilkes-Barre Barons
- 1959–1960: Allentown Jets
- 1960–1961: Wilkes-Barre Barons
- 1961–1962: Scranton Miners

Coaching
- 1966–1967: Asbury Park Boardwalkers

Career highlights
- NBA champion (1956); 2× EPBL champion (1958, 1959); EPBL Most Valuable Player (1958); All-EPBL First Team (1958); All-EPBL Second Team (1957); Third-team All-American – AP, UPI (1953); No. 14 retired by Villanova Wildcats

Career NBA statistics
- Points: 331
- Rebounds: 94
- Assists: 73
- Stats at NBA.com
- Stats at Basketball Reference

Larry Hennessy (May 20, 1929 – August 20, 2008) was an American basketball player.

Hennessy, a 6' 4" forward out of Blessed Sacrament High School in New Rochelle, New York, played college basketball for Villanova University. An excellent passer and rebounder, Hennessy finished his collegiate career with 1737 points. He was named to the 1951–52 sophomore All-America first team.

Hennessy played professionally in the NBA for the Philadelphia Warriors in 1955–56, and for the Syracuse Nationals in 1956–57.

Hennessy played in the Eastern Professional Basketball League (EPBL) for the Wilkes-Barre Barons, Allentown Jets and Scranton Miners from 1956 to 1962. He won EPBL championships with the Barons in 1958 and 1959. Hennessy was selected as the EPBL Most Valuable Player and as a member of the All-EPBL First Team in 1958 and to the Second Team in 1957. Hennessy served as head coach of the Asbury Park Boardwalkers during the 1966–67 season and accumulated a 2–17 record.

== Career statistics ==
Legend
| GP | Games played | GS | Games started | MPG | Minutes per game |
| FG% | Field goal percentage | 3P% | 3-point field goal percentage | FT% | Free throw percentage |
| RPG | Rebounds per game | APG | Assists per game | SPG | Steals per game |
| BPG | Blocks per game | PPG | Points per game | **Bold** | Career high |
| † | Won an NBA championship |

=== NBA ===
==== Regular season ====
| Year | Team | GP | MPG | FG% | FT% | RPG | APG | PPG |
|---|---|---|---|---|---|---|---|---|
| 1955–56† | Philadelphia | **53** | 8.4 | **.344** | **.813** | .9 | .9 | 3.7 |
| 1956–57 | Philadelphia | 2 | 12.5 | .286 | – | .5 | **1.5** | 2.0 |
| 1956–57 | Syracuse | 19 | **18.3** | .321 | .719 | **2.3** | 1.3 | **6.9** |
| Career | | 74 | 11.0 | .334 | .766 | 1.3 | 1.0 | 4.5 |

==== Playoffs ====
| Year | Team | GP | MPG | FG% | FT% | RPG | APG | PPG |
|---|---|---|---|---|---|---|---|---|
| 1956† | Philadelphia | 3 | 3.7 | .000 | – | .3 | .7 | .0 |
