= Waite Bellamy =

American basketball player

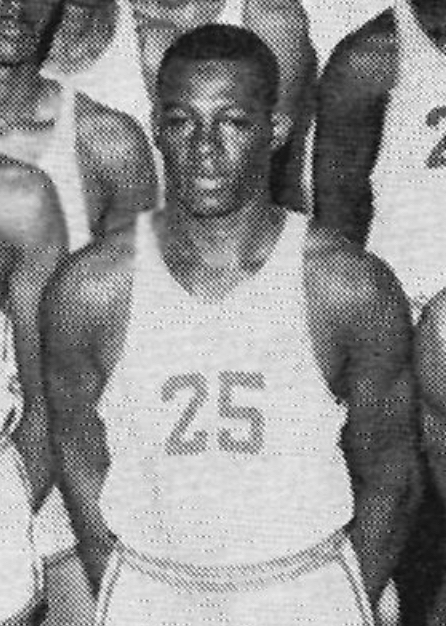
- Bellamy with the Florida A&M Rattlers during the 1962–63 season

Personal information
- Born: February 1940 (age 86) Bradenton, Florida, U.S.
- Listed height: 6 ft 4 in (1.93 m)
- Listed weight: 195 lb (88 kg)

Career information
- High school: Lincoln (Palmetto, Florida)
- College: Florida A&M (1959–1963)
- NBA draft: 1963: 4th round, 33rd overall pick
- Drafted by: St. Louis Hawks
- Playing career: 1963–1971
- Position: Guard
- Coaching career: 1977–2001

Career history

Playing
- 1963–1971: Wilmington / Delaware Blue Bombers

Coaching
- 1977–1986: Sarasota HS (assistant)
- 1984: Sarasota Stingers (assistant)
- 1986–2001: Booker HS

Career highlights
- 2× EPBL champion (1966, 1967); EPBL Most Valuable Player (1970); 2× All-EPBL First Team (1969, 1970); All-EPBL Second Team (1968); No. 9 jersey retired by Delaware Blue Coats; 3x All-SIAC (1961–1963); No. 25 jersey retired by Florida A&M Rattlers
- Stats at Basketball Reference

Waite Bellamy Jr. (born February 1940) is an American former professional basketball player and coach. He played college basketball for the Florida A&M Rattlers and was selected in the 1963 NBA draft by the St. Louis Hawks. Bellamy spent his entire professional career with the Wilmington / Delaware Blue Bombers of the Eastern Professional Basketball League (EPBL) where he won two championships in 1966 and 1967. He was named as the league's Most Valuable Player in 1970. Bellamy worked as a teacher and basketball coach at high schools in Florida after his playing retirement.

== Early life ==
Bellamy's mother, Ruth (died 2002), was from Trilby, Florida, and worked as a seamstress. His father, Waite Sr. (died 1980), was a native of Little River, South Carolina, and worked in the railroad industry. Bellamy was raised by his mother and aspired to be a basketball player "as far back as [he] can remember." He used the rim of a can nailed to a tree in his backyard as his childhood basketball hoop and practiced everyday until it became too dark to see. Bellamy's earliest idols were George Mikan and Paul Arizin.

Bellamy attended Lincoln High School in Palmetto, Florida. He averaged 25 points as a senior while his team finished the season with a 30–5 record and advanced to the state tournament. Bellamy served as captain of the football team, where he played as a center and tackle. He was also president of the school's student body. Bellamy graduated in 1959.

== College career ==
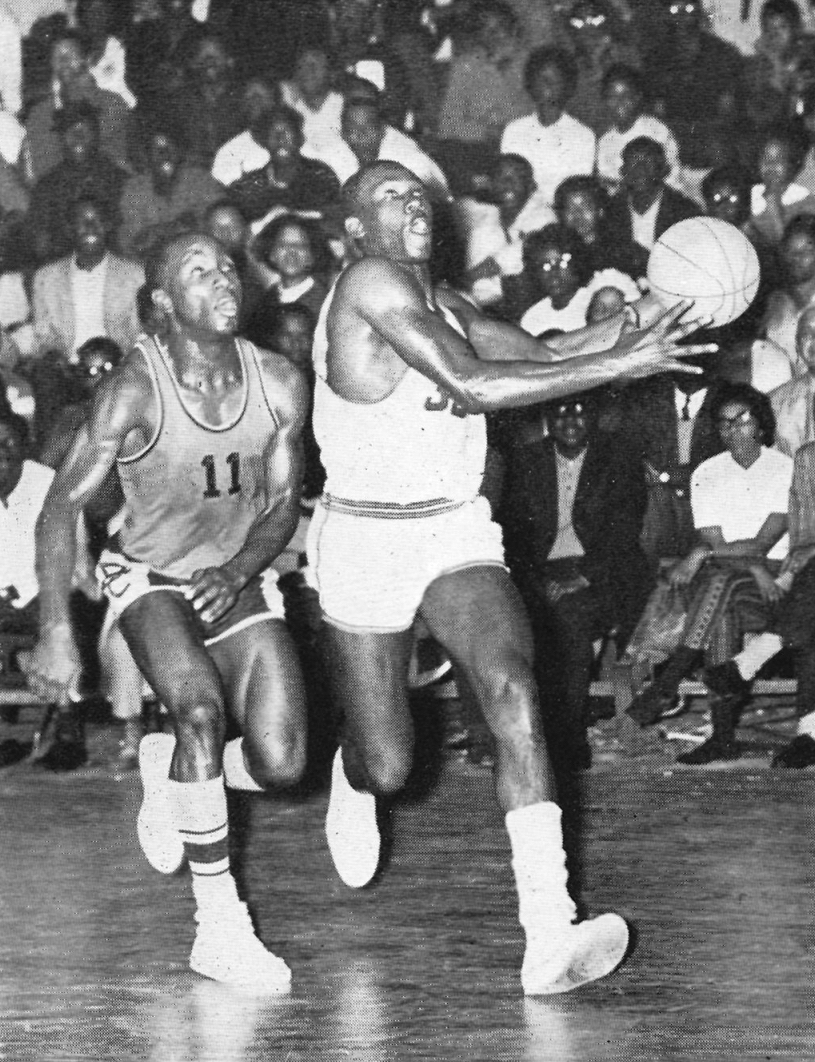
Bellamy drives past Freddie Filmore of Bethune–Cookman during the 1962–63 season

Bellamy did not receive any scholarships from major Southern colleges as they did not offer them to black players at the time. He was offered a football scholarship to attend Florida A&M University but a bad back forced him to quit playing football; Florida A&M instead kept Bellamy on a basketball scholarship.

Bellamy tallied 1,600 points and was a three-time All-SIAC selection from 1961 to 1963. He set the Rattlers' single-game scoring record when he totalled 53 points against the Bethune–Cookman Wildcats.

Bellamy graduated from Florida A&M with a Bachelor of Science in physical education.

Bellamy was inducted into the Florida A&M Athletics Hall of Fame in 1987. His number 25 jersey was retired by the Rattlers and hangs in the Al Lawson Center.

== Professional career ==
Bellamy was selected by the St. Louis Hawks in the 4th round of the 1963 NBA draft. He only attended the first day of summer camp with the Hawks when they discovered that he had a fractured foot; Bellamy had tried to conceal the injury because he feared he could not otherwise participate. In September 1963, the Hawks informed Bellamy that he was not needed but they had arranged for him to play with the Scranton Miners in the Eastern Professional Basketball League (EPBL) if he desired. Bellamy spent one day in Scranton, Pennsylvania, when he was approached by Bill Kauffman who was organizing a new EPBL team called the Wilmington Blue Bombers and recruited Bellamy to join. Bellamy liked the idea of playing for a new team and Kauffman's "deal sounded better."

Bellamy played with the Blue Bombers for eight seasons. Bellamy was awarded as the EPBL Most Valuable Player in 1970 and earned three selections to the All-EPBL team. He won two championships with the Blue Bombers in 1966 and 1967. He led the league in scoring during the 1969–70 season with 838 points.

Bellamy earned invitations to National Basketball Association (NBA) training camps with the Philadelphia 76ers in 1968, Baltimore Bullets in 1969 and New York Knicks in 1970. He did not know why he never made an NBA team. 76ers head coach Jack Ramsay offered to try getting him into the American Basketball Association (ABA) but Bellamy preferred his set-up in Wilmington where he worked as a teacher to supplement his basketball career. Blue Bombers owner, Joe Horwitz, reflected in a 2002 interview: "I never knew why [Bellamy] never made the NBA. He was the star of the league, the best shooter in the league."

Bellamy's relationship with the Blue Bombers soured in January 1971 when his salary was cut from $150 to $100 per game. The team folded in July 1971 and Bellamy was selected in the dispersal draft by a team in Cherry Hill, New Jersey. He attended four pre-season practices with the team but decided not to join because "things were too shaky there." Bellamy announced his retirement from playing basketball in December 1971, citing disenchantment.

The EPBL (rebranded as the Eastern Basketball Association) attempted to recruit Bellamy back into the league until 1973 with an offer from the Allentown Jets and an invitation by league president Bill Montzman but Bellamy declined.

== Coaching career ==
Bellamy was an assistant coach of the basketball team at Sarasota High School under head coach Flody Suarez for nine seasons. He was appointed as head coach of the basketball team at Booker High School in 1986.

Bellamy served as an assistant coach for the Sarasota Stingers of the Continental Basketball Association under interim head coach Tim Eisnaugle in 1984.

== Post-playing career ==
Bellamy worked as a mathematics teacher in the Sarasota County high school system; he started at Sarasota High School and then moved to Booker High School where he worked until his retirement in May 2001.

Bellamy was inducted in the National Negro High School Basketball Hall of Fame in 2008 and the Florida Association of Basketball Coaches Court of Legends in 2016.

On March 24, 2023, Bellamy and his surviving Blue Bombers teammates were honored by Delaware Blue Coats during the halftime of an NBA G League game. Bellamy was presented with his 1970 EBL MVP trophy for the first time while he received chants of "MVP" from the crowd.

On February 9, 2024, the Delaware Blue Coats announced that they would retire Bellamy's number 9 jersey and hang it in the rafters of Chase Fieldhouse. Bellamy said that it was "one of the greatest honors any athlete can experience."

== Personal life ==
Bellamy has two sons who played basketball at Sarasota High School. His son, Troy, played college basketball for the Rollins Tars.

Bellamy's cousin, Levon Simms, was a teammate of his on the Florida A&M Rattlers during the 1962–63 season.
