= George Bruns (basketball) =

American basketball player

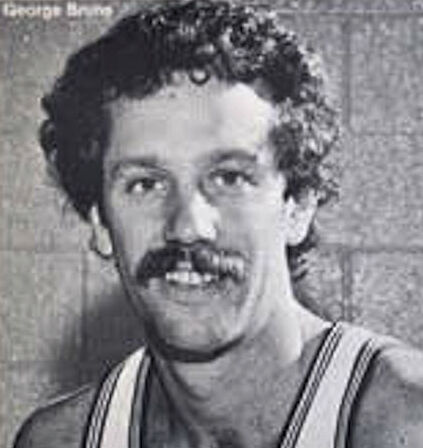
- Bruns with the Allentown Jets in 1977

Personal information
- Born: August 30, 1946 (age 80) Brooklyn, New York, U.S.
- Listed height: 6 ft 0 in (1.83 m)
- Listed weight: 160 lb (73 kg)

Career information
- High school: St. Augustine (Brooklyn, New York)
- College: Manhattan (1962–1966)
- NBA draft: 1966: undrafted
- Playing career: 1968–1978
- Position: Point guard
- Number: 3

Career history

Playing
- 1968–1969: Hartford Capitols
- 1970–1971: Hamden Bics
- 1971–1978: Allentown Jets
- 1973: New York Nets

Coaching
- 1976–1977: Allentown Jets

Career highlights
- 3× EBA champion (1972, 1975, 1976); 4× All-EBA First Team (1972, 1974–1976)
- Stats at Basketball Reference

George William Bruns (born August 30, 1946, in Brooklyn, New York) is a retired American basketball player.

He played collegiately for Manhattan College graduating in 1966.

Bruns played in the Eastern Professional Basketball League (EPBL) / Eastern Basketball Association (EBA) for the Hartford Capitols, Hamden Bics and Allentown Jets from 1968 to 1978. He won EBA championships with the Jets in 1972, 1975 and 1976. He was selected to the All-EBA First Team in 1972, 1974, 1975 and 1976. Bruns served as head coach of the Jets during the 1976–77 season.

He played for the New York Nets (1972–73) in the ABA for 13 games.

Bruns was also a teacher and head basketball and baseball coach at Monsignor McClancy Memorial High School in East Elmhurst, Queens, New York. His 1971 McClancy Crusaders team went to the NY CHSAA City Championships only to lose to LaSalle Academy in the City finals played at Rose Hill at Fordham.

Bruns is currently the boys high school varsity basketball coach at Manhasset High School, Manhasset, New York. He led the team to the Nassau County Championship during the 2010–2011 season. He also led the team to the Long Island Championship during the 2018–2019 season, only to lose to Poughkeepsie in the state championships. In the 2021–22 season his team won both the Long Island and New York State Class A Championships. The Indians fell to South Side in the Nassau County Final the following season.

Bruns also runs a basketball camp for kids ages 6–15 every summer, which has been running for over 40 consecutive years.

He was also on the faculty at Nassau Community College where he taught mathematics for fifty years. He was Head Coach of the Women's Basketball Team from 1992 to 2001.
