= Andy Johnson (basketball) =

American basketball player (1932–2002)

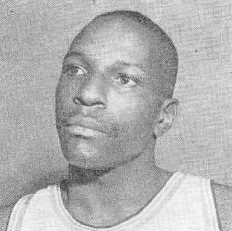
- Johnson, c. 1962

Personal information
- Born: November 8, 1932 Los Angeles, California, U.S.
- Died: August 30, 2002 (aged 69)
- Listed height: 6 ft 5 in (1.96 m)
- Listed weight: 215 lb (98 kg)

Career information
- High school: North Hollywood (North Hollywood, California)
- College: Portland (1950–1953)
- NBA draft: 1953: undrafted
- Playing career: 1958–1971
- Position: Power forward / small forward
- Number: 12
- Coaching career: 1970–1971

Career history

Playing
- 1958–1961: Philadelphia Warriors
- 1961–1962: Chicago Packers
- 1962–1963: Philadelphia Tapers
- 1962–1969: Allentown Jets
- 1970–1971: Camden Bullets

Coaching
- 1970–1971: Camden Bullets

Career highlights
- 3× EPBL champion (1963, 1965, 1968); EPBL Most Valuable Player (1964); All-EPBL First Team (1964); All-EPBL Second Team (1963)
- Stats at NBA.com
- Stats at Basketball Reference

Andrew Johnson Jr. (November 8, 1932 – August 30, 2002) was an American professional basketball player and coach.

A 6'5" guard/forward, Johnson played at the University of Portland in the 1950s before serving with the US military in the Korean War. He began his professional basketball career with the Harlem Globetrotters, then played in the NBA from 1958 to 1962 as a member of the Philadelphia Warriors and Chicago Packers. He averaged 9.8 points over his NBA career, posting a high of 14.3 points per game with the Packers in the 1961–62 season.

To Johnson's surprise, he was cut by Chicago before the 1962–63 season began, allegedly because he "didn't know the plays". He then joined the Philadelphia Tapers of the American Basketball League. Johnson hoped to return to the NBA after a season with the Tapers, but such an opportunity never materialized. He played eight more years in the Eastern Professional Basketball League (EPBL) / Eastern Basketball Association (EBA). He won EPBL championships with the Allentown Jets in 1963, 1965 and 1968. Johnson was named as the EPBL Most Valuable Player with the Allentown Jets in 1964. He served as player-coach of the Camden Bullets during the 1970–71 season and led the team to a 12–16 record.

Because he had been cut by the Chicago Packers before his fifth NBA season, he did not qualify for a pension from the NBA, though after some effort, he managed to receive some money from them later in his life.

Johnson is the subject of a 2010 biography called Basketball Slave. The book was written by his son, Mark, who believed his father had been exploited throughout his athletic career on account of his ethnicity.

== Career statistics ==
Legend
GP	Games played	GS	Games started	MPG	Minutes per game
FG%	Field goal percentage	3P%	3-point field goal percentage	FT%	Free throw percentage
RPG	Rebounds per game	APG	Assists per game	SPG	Steals per game
BPG	Blocks per game	PPG	Points per game	**Bold**	Career high
*	Led the league

=== NBA ===
==== Regular season ====
Year	Team	GP	MPG	FG%	FT%	RPG	APG	PPG
1958–59	Philadelphia	67	17.3	.373	.602	3.2	1.3	6.9
1959–60	Philadelphia	75	18.9	.378	.601	3.8	2.0	8.2
1960–61	Philadelphia	**79***	25.3	.359	.571	4.4	2.6	9.6
1961–62	Chicago	71	**30.9**	**.448**	**.628**	**4.9**	**3.2**	**14.3**
Career		292	23.2	.392	.605	4.1	2.3	9.8

==== Playoffs ====
Year	Team	GP	MPG	FG%	FT%	RPG	APG	PPG
1960	Philadelphia	**9**	**20.3**	**.418**	.511	**5.0**	**2.3**	**8.9**
1961	Philadelphia	3	16.7	.318	**.667**	3.3	.3	6.7
Career		12	19.4	.393	.536	4.6	1.8	8.3
