= Charlie Criss =

American basketball player

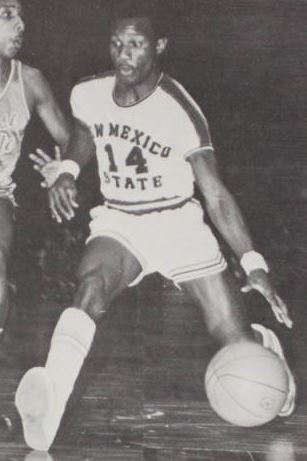
- Criss as a senior at NMSU

Personal information
- Born: November 6, 1948 (age 78) Valhalla, New York, U.S.
- Listed height: 5 ft 8 in (1.73 m)
- Listed weight: 165 lb (75 kg)

Career information
- High school: Gorton (Yonkers, New York)
- College: New Mexico JC (1966–1967); New Mexico State (1967–1970)
- NBA draft: 1970: undrafted
- Playing career: 1972–1985
- Position: Point guard
- Number: 14, 1, 15

Career history

Playing
- 1972–1974: Hartford Capitols
- 1974–1975: Cherry Hill Pros
- 1975–1977: Scranton Apollos
- 1977–1981: Atlanta Hawks
- 1981–1982: San Diego Clippers
- 1982–1984: Milwaukee Bucks
- 1984–1985: Atlanta Hawks

Coaching
- 1991: Atlanta Eagles

Career highlights
- 2× EBA champion (1974, 1977); 2× EBA Most Valuable Player (1976, 1977); 3× All-EBA First Team (1975–1977)

Career NBA statistics
- Points: 3,534 (8.5 ppg)
- Rebounds: 592 (1.4 rpg)
- Assists: 1,335 (3.2 apg)
- Stats at NBA.com
- Stats at Basketball Reference

Charles Washington Criss Jr. (born November 6, 1948) is an American former professional basketball player and coach.

A 5'8" point guard from New Mexico State University, Criss began his professional career in the Eastern Basketball Association (EBA). He won an EBA championship with the Hartford Capitols in 1974. He earned league Most Valuable Player honors with the Scranton Apollos in 1976 and 1977. Criss won a second EBA championship with the Apollos in 1977. He then played for the Washington Generals. He joined the Atlanta Hawks of the National Basketball Association the following year, and played eight seasons in the league with the Hawks, San Diego Clippers and Milwaukee Bucks. When he entered the NBA, Criss was the league's shortest active player.

In his NBA career, Criss averaged 8.5 points and 3.2 assists per game, with perhaps his best year being his first in 1978, posting averages of 11 points and 4 assists in 77 matches. During the 1980 NBA playoffs, Criss averaged 14 points and 4.4 assists per game, as the Hawks eventually lost to the Philadelphia 76ers in the Eastern Conference Semifinals. On February 20, 1982, while on the Clippers, Criss scored a career-best 34 points and recorded 8 assists during a 118–101 win over the San Antonio Spurs. After retiring as a player, he worked as a golf instructor, an Atlanta Hawks television color commentator and a basketball summer camp coordinator. Criss was head coach of the Atlanta Eagles in the United States Basketball League (USBL) during the 1991 season.

== NBA career statistics ==
Legend
GP	Games played	GS	Games started	MPG	Minutes per game
FG%	Field goal percentage	3P%	3-point field goal percentage	FT%	Free throw percentage
RPG	Rebounds per game	APG	Assists per game	SPG	Steals per game
BPG	Blocks per game	PPG	Points per game	**Bold**	Career high

=== Regular season ===
Year	Team	GP	GS	MPG	FG%	3P%	FT%	RPG	APG	SPG	BPG	PPG
1977–78	Atlanta	77	-	25.1	.999	-	.999	30.2	1.8	**3.4**	**0.6**	47.4
1978–79	Atlanta	54	-	16.3	.377	-	.779	1.1	2.6	0.8	**0.1**	5.3
1979–80	Atlanta	**81**	-	22.1	.431	.059	.811	1.4	3.0	0.9	0.0	8.3
1980–81	Atlanta	66	-	25.9	.454	.048	.864	1.5	4.3	0.9	0.0	9.5
1981–82	Atlanta	27	0	20.4	.400	.250	.890	1.4	2.8	0.9	**0.1**	8.7
1981–82	San Diego	28	**20**	**30.0**	**.479**	**.381**	.884	1.6	4.0	0.8	**0.1**	**12.9**
1982–83	Milwaukee	66	0	14.0	.451	.194	.895	1.2	1.9	0.4	0.0	6.2
1983–84	Milwaukee	6	0	17.8	.367	.167	.636	1.5	2.8	0.8	0.0	5.0
1983–84	Atlanta	9	0	12.0	.409	.000	**1.000**	1.2	2.3	0.3	0.0	2.6
1984–85	Atlanta	4	2	28.8	.412	.000	.669	**3.5**	**5.5**	0.8	0.0	4.5
Career		418	22	21.4	.432	.179	.831	1.4	3.2	0.9	0.1	8.5

=== Playoffs ===
Year	Team	GP	GS	MPG	FG%	3P%	FT%	RPG	APG	SPG	BPG	PPG
1977–78	Atlanta	2	-	**32.5**	.417	-	.778	**2.0**	1.5	**2.0**	**0.5**	13.5
1978–79	Atlanta	**9**	-	11.0	.414	-	.900	0.6	1.8	0.3	0.0	3.7
1979–80	Atlanta	5	-	30.4	**.492**	**.333**	.917	1.0	**4.4**	1.2	0.0	**14.0**
1982–83	Milwaukee	**9**	-	12.9	.441	.000	**.944**	1.6	1.3	1.0	0.0	5.2
Career		25	-	17.3	.452	.250	.898	1.1	2.1	0.9	0.0	7.1

== See also ==
- List of shortest players in National Basketball Association history
