= Continental Basketball Association MVP Award =

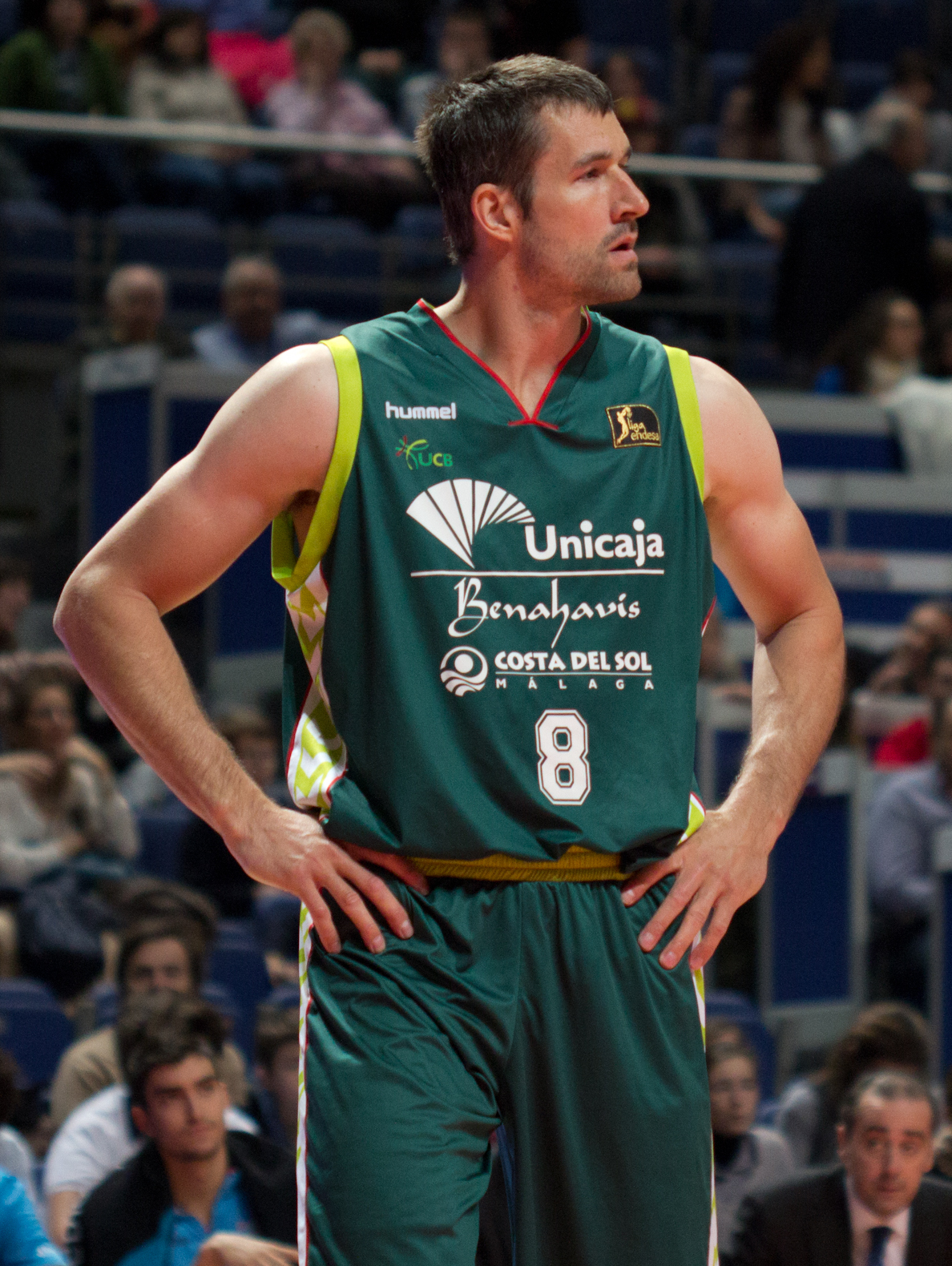
Andy Panko, 2002–03 CBA MVP

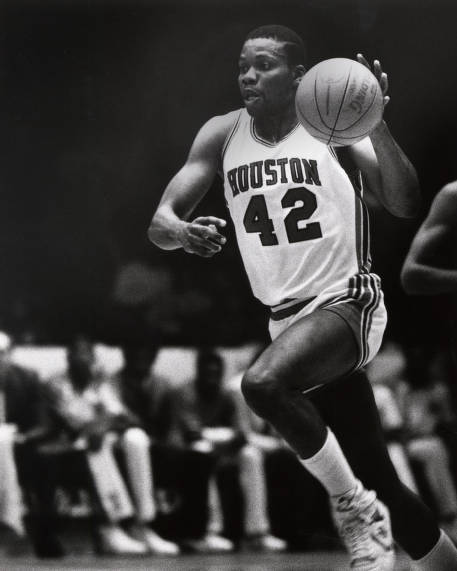
Michael Young, 1985–86 CBA MVP

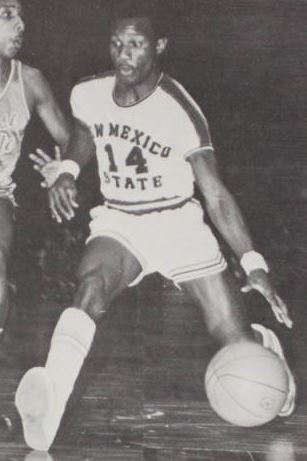
Charlie Criss, 1975–76 and 1976–77 EBA MVP

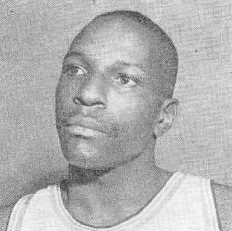
Andy Johnson, 1963–64 EBA MVP

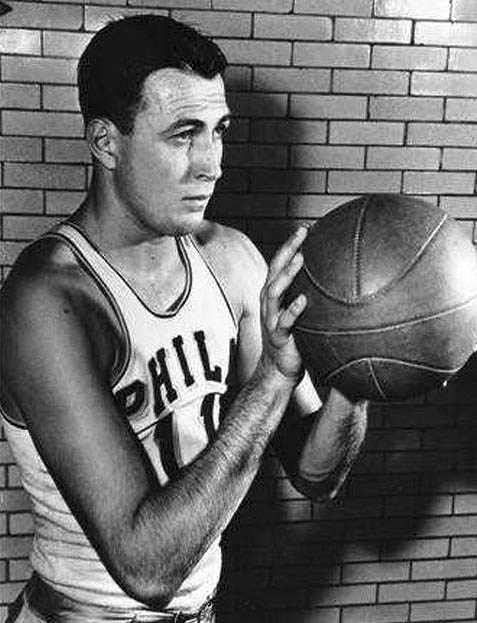
Paul Arizin, 1962–63 EBA MVP

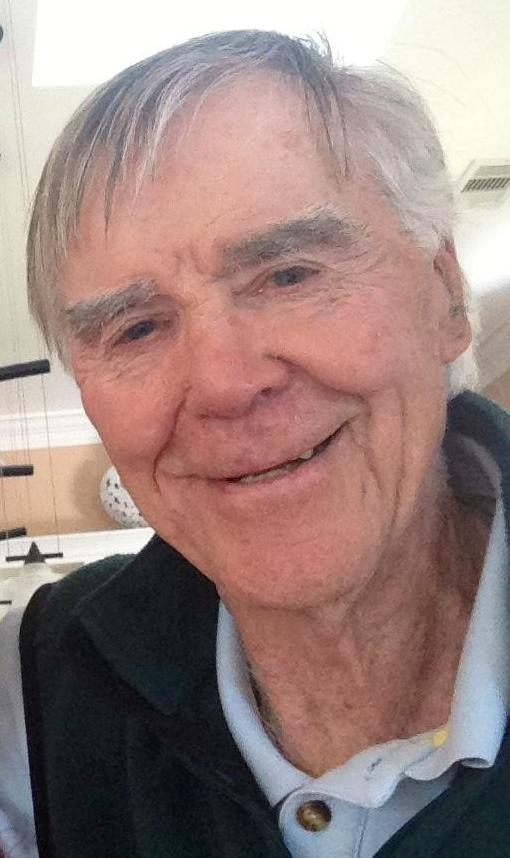
Jack McCloskey; 1952–53 and 1953–54 EBA MVP.

The Continental Basketball Association (CBA) Player of the Year, formerly known as the Eastern Basketball Association (EBA) Most Valuable Player and the CBA Most Valuable Player, was an annual award given to the best player in the CBA. The winner was selected by a vote of the league's head coaches. Twenty-three of the winners have been guards, 30 have been forwards, and only four have been centers. There have been two players—Jack McCloskey and Vincent Askew—who were two time recipients of the award. The Scranton Miners/Apollos have had six players named the EBA Most Valuable Player. The league's name was changed from the Eastern Basketball Association to the Continental Basketball Association following the 1977–78 season. Since then the Quad City Thunder have had the most players to win the award with five. The Montana Golden Nuggets and the Yakima/Yakama Sun Kings are the only teams to have one of their players win the award for three seasons in a row.

== Key ==
| ^ | Denotes player who is still active in professional basketball |
| † | Denotes player whose team won championship that year |
| Ref | Reference |
| Player (X) | Denotes the number of times the player has been named MVP |
| Team (X) | Denotes the number of times a player from this team has won |

== Table ==
| Season | Player | Position | Nationality | Team | Ref |
|---|---|---|---|---|---|
Eastern Basketball Association (EBA) Most Valuable Player
| 1949–50 | Bill Zubic | Forward | United States | Lancaster Rockets | |
| 1950–51† | Jerry Rullo | Guard | United States | Sunbury Mercuries | |
| 1951–52† | Chink Crossin | Guard | United States | Pottsville Packers | |
| 1952–53 | Jack McCloskey | Guard | United States | Sunbury Mercuries (2) | |
| 1953–54 | Jack McCloskey (2) | Guard | United States | Sunbury Mercuries (3) | |
| 1954–55 | Sherman White | Forward | United States | Hazleton Hawks | |
| 1955–56 | Jack Molinas | Forward | United States | Wilmington Jets | |
| 1956–57 | Hal Lear | Guard | United States | Easton Madisons | |
| 1957–58† | Larry Hennessy | Guard | United States | Wilkes-Barre Barons | |
| 1958–59 | Bill Spivey | Center | United States | Wilkes-Barre Barons (2) | |
| 1959–60 | Stacey Arceneaux | Forward | United States | Scranton Miners | |
| 1960–61 | Boo Ellis | Forward | United States | Wilkes-Barre Barons (3) | |
| 1961–62† | Roman Turmon | Forward | United States | Allentown Jets | |
| 1962–63† | Paul Arizin | Forward | United States | Camden Bullets | |
| 1963–64† | Andy Johnson | Forward | United States | Allentown Jets (2) | |
| 1964–65 | Walt Simon | Forward | United States | Allentown Jets (3) | |
| 1965–66 | Julius McCoy | Forward | United States | Scranton Miners (2) | |
| 1966–67 | Willie Murrell | Forward | United States | Scranton Miners (3) | |
| 1967–68 | Ken Wilburn | Forward | United States | Trenton Colonials | |
| 1968–69† | Stan Pawlak | Guard | United States | Wilkes-Barre Barons (4) | |
| 1969–70 | Waite Bellamy | Guard | United States | Wilmington Blue Bombers | |
| 1970–71† | Willie Somerset | Guard | United States | Scranton Apollos (4) | |
| 1971–72† | Harthorne Wingo | Forward | United States | Allentown Jets (4) | |
| 1972–73 | Ed Johnson | Center | United States | Hartford Capitols | |
| 1973–74 | Ken Wilburn | Forward | United States | Allentown Jets (5) | |
| 1974–75 | Jerry Baskerville | Forward | United States | Hazleton Bullets | |
| 1975–76 | Charlie Criss | Guard | United States | Scranton Apollos (5) | |
| 1976–77† | Charlie Criss (2) | Guard | United States | Scranton Apollos (6) | |
| 1977–78† | Paul McCracken | Guard | United States | Wilkes-Barre Barons (5) | |
Continental Basketball Association (CBA) Most Valuable Player
| 1978–79† | Andre McCarter | Guard | United States | Rochester Zeniths | |
| 1979–80† | Ron Davis | Forward | United States | Anchorage Northern Knights | |
| 1980–81 | Willie Smith | Guard | United States | Montana Golden Nuggets | |
| 1981–82 | Ronnie Valentine | Forward | United States | Montana Golden Nuggets (2) | |
| 1982–83 | Robert Smith | Guard | United States | Montana Golden Nuggets (3) | |
| 1983–84 | Geoff Crompton | Center | United States | Puerto Rico Coquis | |
| 1984–85† | Steve Hayes | Center | United States | Tampa Bay Thrillers | |
| 1985–86 | Michael Young | Forward | United States | Detroit Spirits | |
| 1986–87 | Joe Binion | Forward | United States | Topeka Sizzlers | |
| 1987–88† | Michael Brooks | Forward | United States | Albany Patroons | |
| 1988–89 | Anthony Bowie | Guard | United States | Quad City Thunder | |
| 1989–90 | Vincent Askew | Guard | United States | Albany Patroons (2) | |
| 1990–91 | Vincent Askew (2) | Guard | United States | Albany Patroons (3) | |
| 1991–92 | Barry Mitchell | Forward | United States | Quad City Thunder (2) | |
| 1992–93 | Derek Strong | Forward | United States | Quad City Thunder (3) | |
| 1993–94 | Ronnie Grandison | Forward | United States | Rochester Renegade | |
| 1994–95† | Eldridge Recasner | Guard | United States | Yakima Sun Kings | |
| 1995–96 | Shelton Jones | Forward | United States | Florida Beach Dogs | |
| 1996–97 | Dexter Boney | Guard | United States | Florida Beach Dogs (2) | |
| 1997–98 | Jimmy King | Guard | United States | Quad City Thunder (4) | |
| 1998–99† | Adrian Griffin | Forward | United States | Connecticut Pride | |
| 1999–2000 | Jeff McInnis | Guard | United States | Quad City Thunder (5) | |
| 2000–01 | Not awarded after league went defunct | | | | |
| 2001–02 | Miles Simon | Guard | United States | Dakota Wizards | |
| 2002–03 | Andy Panko | Forward | United States | Dakota Wizards (2) | |
| 2003–04 | Josh Davis | Forward | United States | Idaho Stampede | |
| 2004–05 | Sam Clancy Jr. | Forward | United States | Idaho Stampede (2) | |
Continental Basketball Association (CBA) Player of the Year
| 2005–06 | Anthony Goldwire | Guard | United States | Yakama Sun Kings (2) | |
| 2006–07 | Galen Young | Forward | United States | Yakama Sun Kings (3) | |
| 2007–08 | Daryan Selvy | Forward | United States | Yakama Sun Kings (4) | |
