= Stacey Arceneaux =

American basketball player (1936–2015)

Personal information
- Born: February 17, 1936 New York City, New York, U.S.
- Died: March 4, 2015 (aged 79) Florida, U.S.
- Listed height: 6 ft 4 in (1.93 m)
- Listed weight: 210 lb (95 kg)

Career information
- High school: William H. Taft (Bronx, New York)
- NBA draft: 1958: undrafted
- Playing career: 1955–1969
- Position: Forward

Career history
- 1955–1956: Wilkes-Barre Barons
- 1956–1961: Scranton Miners
- 1961–1962: Hazleton Hawks
- 1962: St. Louis Hawks
- 1962–1963: Scranton Miners
- 1963–1967: Trenton Colonials
- 1967–1969: Hartford Capitols

Career highlights
- EPBL champion (1957); EPBL Most Valuable Player (1960); 4× All-EPBL First Team (1959–1961, 1963); All-EPBL Second Team (1958, 1962)
- Stats at NBA.com
- Stats at Basketball Reference

Robert L. Stacey (February 17, 1936 – March 4, 2015), better known as Stacey Arceneaux, was an American professional basketball player.

Arceneaux played for fourteen seasons in the Eastern Professional Basketball League (EPBL) where he was named as the Most Valuable Player in 1960. He won an EPBL championship with the Scranton Miners in 1957.

Arceneaux played for the St. Louis Hawks (1961–62) in the NBA for 7 games. He died in 2015.

== Career statistics ==
Legend
GP	Games played	GS	Games started	MPG	Minutes per game
FG%	Field goal percentage	3P%	3-point field goal percentage	FT%	Free throw percentage
RPG	Rebounds per game	APG	Assists per game	SPG	Steals per game
BPG	Blocks per game	PPG	Points per game	**Bold**	Career high

=== NBA ===
==== Regular season ====
Year	Team	GP	MPG	FG%	FT%	RPG	APG	PPG
1961–62	St. Louis	7	15.7	.393	.462	4.6	.6	7.1
