= Don Collins =

American basketball player (born 1958)

Personal information
- Born: November 28, 1958 (age 67) Toledo, Ohio, U.S.
- Listed height: 6 ft 6 in (1.98 m)
- Listed weight: 190 lb (86 kg)

Career information
- High school: Scott (Toledo, Ohio)
- College: Washington State (1976–1980)
- NBA draft: 1980: 1st round, 18th overall pick
- Drafted by: Atlanta Hawks
- Playing career: 1980–1994
- Position: Small forward / shooting guard
- Number: 42, 7, 22, 18, 12

Career history
- 1980–1981: Atlanta Hawks
- 1981–1983: Washington Bullets
- 1983–1984: Golden State Warriors
- 1984–1985: Lancaster Lightning
- 1985: Washington Bullets
- 1985–1986: Baltimore Lightning
- 1986: Tampa Bay Thrillers
- 1986–1987: Tampa Bay Stars
- 1987: Rapid City Thrillers
- 1987: Milwaukee Bucks
- 1987–1991: CSP Limoges
- 1992–1994: La Rochelle

Career highlights
- FIBA Saporta Cup Finals Top Scorer (1988); 3× French League Foreign MVP (1988–1990); 2× CBA champion (1986, 1987); CBA All-Star Game MVP (1986); 2× CBA First Team (1985, 1986); All-CBA Second Team (1987); CBA Newcomer of the Year (1985); CBA scoring champion (1986); Second-team All-American – AP (1980); Pac-10 Player of the Year (1980); First-team All-Pac-10 (1980); 2× Second-team All-Pac-10 (1978, 1979)

Career NBA statistics
- Points: 2,983 (9.8 ppg)
- Rebounds: 837 (2.8 rpg)
- Assists: 546 (1.8 apg)
- Stats at NBA.com
- Stats at Basketball Reference

Donald Collins (born November 28, 1958) is an American former professional basketball player. He was drafted by the Atlanta Hawks, in the first round (18th pick), of the 1980 NBA draft. Collins played in 303 National Basketball Association (NBA) games for four teams, over six seasons, averaging just under 10 points per game for his career. He spent the end of his career playing overseas in France.

== College career ==
Collins, a 6'6" tall Scott High School standout, was selected as the Pac-10 Player of the Year, after averaging 23 points per game for Washington State University, in 1980 and leading the Cougars to their first NCAA Tournament berth since 1941. In a 2011 story, Cougfan.com recounted Collins' sterling career at Washington State and made the case that he is the greatest player in school history.

== USBL and CBA ==
Collins starred in basketball minor leagues, averaging more than 30 points per game, in the United States Basketball League (USBL). A member of the Continental Basketball Association (CBA's) 50th Anniversary Team, Collins is regarded as one of the most prolific scorers in the history of minor league basketball.

Collins had two 63-point scoring games in the minor leagues, both in 1986: In the CBA, as a member of the Baltimore Lightning, against the Detroit Spirits; and in the USBL, as a member of the Tampa Bay Flash, against the Jersey Jammers.

That same year, as a member of the Tampa Bay Thrillers, Collins earned MVP honors at the CBA All-Star Game. He won CBA championships with the Thrillers in 1986 and 1987.

Collins was selected to the All-CBA First Team in 1985 and 1986 and the Second Team in 1987.

== Professional career ==
Collins also spent several seasons playing professionally overseas, in France for CSP Limoges and Rupella La Rochelle, and in Switzerland, for Pully and Cossonay.

== NBA career statistics ==
Legend
| GP | Games played | GS | Games started | MPG | Minutes per game |
| FG% | Field goal percentage | 3P% | 3-point field goal percentage | FT% | Free throw percentage |
| RPG | Rebounds per game | APG | Assists per game | SPG | Steals per game |
| BPG | Blocks per game | PPG | Points per game | **Bold** | Career high |

=== Regular season ===
| Year | Team | GP | GS | MPG | FG% | 3P% | FT% | RPG | APG | SPG | BPG | PPG |
|---|---|---|---|---|---|---|---|---|---|---|---|---|
| 1980–81 | Atlanta | 47 | - | **25.2** | .434 | .000 | .846 | **4.0** | **2.4** | **1.5** | 0.2 | **12.7** |
| 1980–81 | Washington | 34 | - | 19.4 | .463 | .000 | .673 | 2.4 | 2.2 | 1.0 | 0.4 | 9.8 |
| 1981–82 | Washington | **79** | 18 | 20.4 | .511 | .083 | .716 | 2.5 | 1.9 | 1.1 | 0.3 | 10.0 |
| 1982–83 | Washington | 65 | **21** | 24.2 | **.523** | .000 | .743 | 3.2 | 2.0 | 1.3 | **0.5** | 11.8 |
| 1983–84 | Golden State | 61 | 6 | 15.7 | .483 | **.200** | .730 | 2.1 | 1.1 | 0.7 | 0.2 | 7.2 |
| 1984–85 | Washington | 11 | 0 | 8.3 | .353 | .000 | **.889** | 1.7 | 0.6 | 0.6 | 0.4 | 2.9 |
| 1986–87 | Milwaukee | 6 | 0 | 9.5 | .357 | .000 | .714 | 2.5 | 0.3 | 0.3 | 0.2 | 4.2 |
| Career | | 303 | 45 | 20.2 | .485 | .069 | .749 | 2.8 | 1.8 | 1.1 | 0.3 | 9.8 |

=== Playoffs ===
| Year | Team | GP | GS | MPG | FG% | 3P% | FT% | RPG | APG | SPG | BPG | PPG |
|---|---|---|---|---|---|---|---|---|---|---|---|---|
| 1981–82 | Washington | **7** | - | **21.3** | **.432** | - | **.714** | **3.1** | **0.9** | **0.6** | **0.1** | **6.1** |
| 1984–85 | Washington | 1 | 0 | 2.0 | .000 | .000 | .000 | 0.0 | 0.0 | 0.0 | 0.0 | 0.0 |
| Career | | 8 | 0 | 18.9 | .432 | .000 | .714 | 2.8 | 0.8 | 0.5 | 0.1 | 5.4 |
