= Andy Panko =

American basketball player

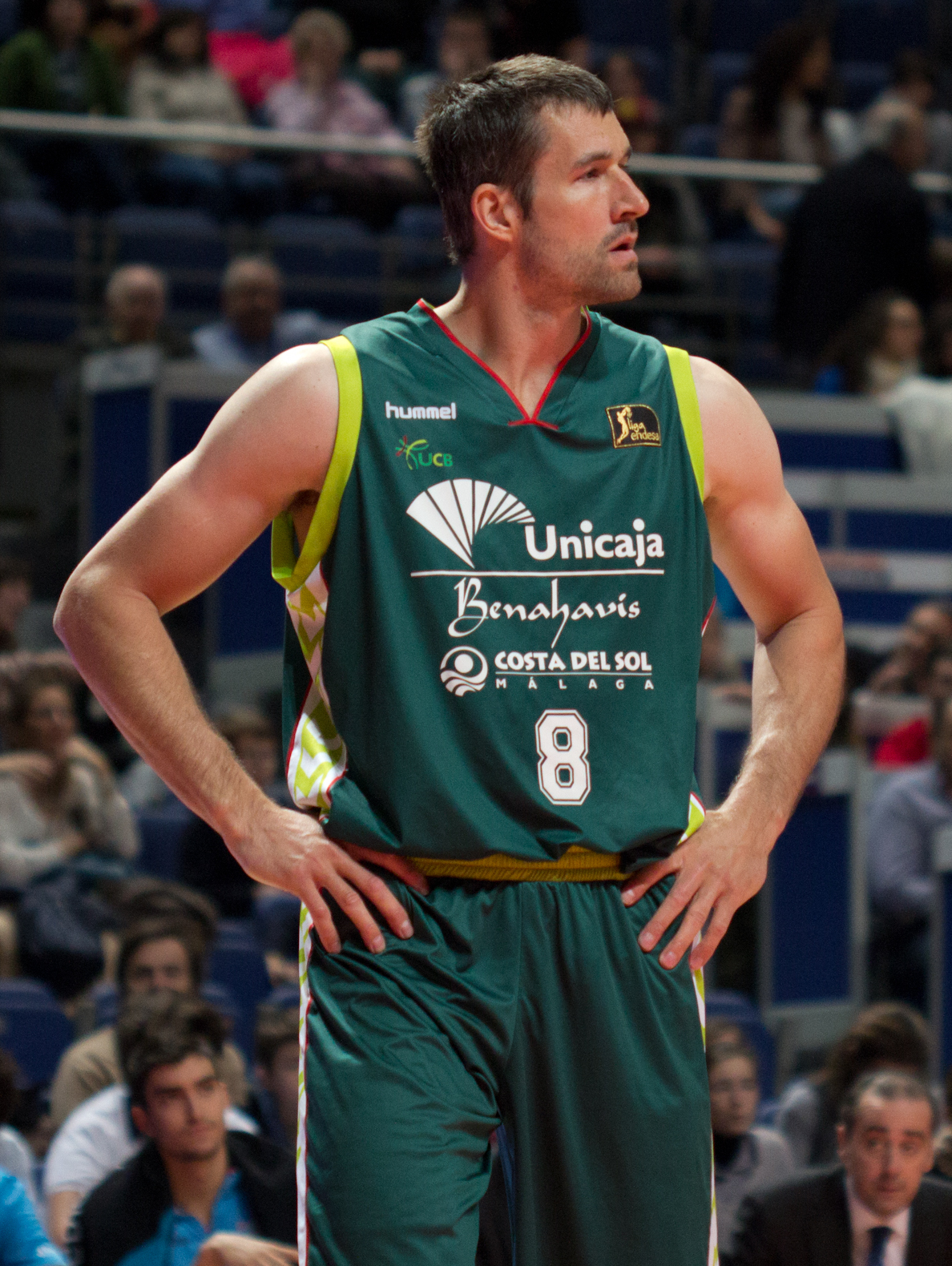
- Panko with Unicaja Málaga in 2013.

Personal information
- Born: November 29, 1977 (age 48) Harrisburg, Pennsylvania, U.S.
- Listed height: 6 ft 9 in (2.06 m)
- Listed weight: 245 lb (111 kg)

Career information
- High school: Bishop McDevitt (Harrisburg, Pennsylvania)
- College: Lebanon Valley (1995–1999)
- NBA draft: 1999: undrafted
- Playing career: 1999–2018
- Position: Small forward / power forward
- Number: 24

Career history
- 1999–2001: New Mexico Slam
- 2001: Atlanta Hawks
- 2001–2002: Basket Napoli
- 2002–2003: Dakota Wizards
- 2003: Casademont Girona
- 2003: Gigantes de Carolina
- 2003–2004: Casademont Girona
- 2004–2005: Caja San Fernando
- 2005–2006: Bilbao Basket
- 2006: PAOK Thessaloniki
- 2007: Bilbao Basket
- 2007–2012: San Sebastián Gipuzkoa
- 2012: Panathinaikos
- 2012–2013: Unicaja Málaga
- 2013–2015: Baloncesto Fuenlabrada
- 2015: Vaqueros de Bayamón
- 2015–2016: SLUC Nancy
- 2016: Vaqueros de Bayamón
- 2016–2017: Fuerza Regia
- 2017: Guaros de Lara
- 2017–2018: Fuerza Regia

Career highlights
- Liga ACB MVP (2012); 3× Liga ACB Top Scorer (2012, 2014, 2015); All-Liga ACB Team (2012); Spanish Second Division MVP (2008); CBA champion (2002); CBA Most Valuable Player (2003); CBA All-Star (2003); All-CBA First Team (2003); LNBP champion (2017); 3× First-team Division III All-American – NABC (1997–1999); 3× MAC Player of the Year (1997–1999); MAC Rookie of the Year (1996)
- Stats at NBA.com
- Stats at Basketball Reference

Andrew John Panko III (born November 29, 1977) is an American former professional basketball player. At 6 ft 9 in (2.06 m) tall, he primarily played the small forward and power forward positions.

== College career ==
After playing high school basketball at Bishop McDevitt in Harrisburg, Pennsylvania, Panko played college basketball at Lebanon Valley College.

== Professional career ==
Panko began his professional career in 1999 with the New Mexico Slam of the International Basketball League. He made his NBA debut with the Atlanta Hawks in 2001, playing just one minute in a single game. Panko played for the Dakota Wizards of the Continental Basketball Association (CBA) from 2002 to 2003. He won a CBA championship with the Wizards in 2002. He was named the CBA Most Valuable Player and earned All-CBA First Team honors in 2003. He was named the Spanish ACB League MVP in 2012, while playing with San Sebastián Gipuzkoa.

In July 2012, he signed with the Greek Basket League / EuroLeague club Panathinaikos. In December 2012, he was traded to Unicaja Malaga for James Gist. At the end of the season he left Unicaja.

On August 14, 2013, Panko signed with Baloncesto Fuenlabrada for the 2013–14 season. On July 29, 2014, he agreed with Fuenlabrada to play one more season. On May 30, 2015, he signed with Vaqueros de Bayamón of Puerto Rico for the rest of the 2015 BSN season.

On July 17, 2015, Panko signed with French club SLUC Nancy Basket for the 2015–16 season. On May 11, 2016, he re-joined the Vaqueros de Bayamón for the rest of the 2016 BSN season.

On September 12, 2016, Panko signed with Mexican club Fuerza Regia. He helped his team to win the 2016–17 LNBP championship. On April 4, 2017, he signed with Guaros de Lara of Venezuela for the rest of the 2017 LPB season. On July 27, 2017, he re-signed with Fuerza Regia for one more season.

== EuroLeague statistics ==
Legend
GP	Games played	GS	Games started	MPG	Minutes per game
FG%	Field-goal percentage	3P%	3-point field-goal percentage	FT%	Free-throw percentage
RPG	Rebounds per game	APG	Assists per game	SPG	Steals per game
BPG	Blocks per game	PPG	Points per game	PIR	Performance index rating
**Bold**	Career high

Year	Team	GP	GS	MPG	FG%	3P%	FT%	RPG	APG	SPG	BPG	PPG	PIR
2012–13	Panathinaikos	9	**6**	**24.4**	**.473**	**.250**	.563	**4.8**	**1.7**	.2	**.1**	**9.2**	**8.9**
2012–13	Unicaja Málaga	**13**	3	23.4	.275	.208	**.667**	3.2	.8	**.3**	**.1**	4.7	1.9
Career		22	9	23.8	.370	.225	.618	3.8	1.1	.3	.1	6.5	4.8

== Awards and accomplishments ==
=== College career ===
- 3× NABC First-Team All-American: (1997, 1998, 1999)
- 3× MAC Most Valuable Player: (1997, 1998, 1999)
- 2× Division III National Player of the Year: (1998, 1999)
- D3hoops.com All-Decade First Team: (2008)
- D3hoops.com Player of the Decade: (2008)
- Lebanon Valley College Athletic Hall of Fame: (2009)
- Small College Basketball National Hall of Fame: (2020)

=== Pro career ===
- CBA Champion: Dakota Wizards: (2002)
- CBA: All-League Team: (2003)
- CBA MVP: (2003)
- Spanish Second Division: MVP: (2008)
- 3× Spanish ACB League Top Scorer: (2012, 2014, 2015)
- All-Spanish League Team: (2012)
- Spanish ACB League MVP: (2012)
