= CBA Finals =

CBA Finals may refer to:

- Chinese Basketball Association Finals
- List of Continental Basketball Association champions
