= Stan Novak =

American basketball coach and player

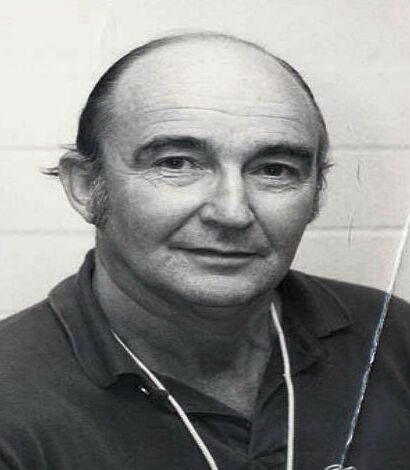
- Novak in 1977

Personal information
- Born: c. 1924
- Died: October 21, 2006 (aged 82)

Career information
- High school: West Philadelphia (Philadelphia, Pennsylvania)
- College: Penn (1943–1944, 1946–1948)
- BAA draft: 1948: undrafted
- Playing career: 1948–1957
- Coaching career: 1949–1980

Career history

Playing
- 1948–1949: Lancaster Red Roses
- 1949–1957: Sunbury Mercuries

Coaching
- 1949–1967: Springfield Township HS
- 1949–1959; 1960–1963: Sunbury Mercuries
- 1963–1964: Trenton Colonials
- 1964–1967: Sunbury Mercuries
- 1967–1970: Wilkes-Barre Barons
- 1970–1977: Scranton Apollos
- 1977–1978: Allentown Jets
- 1979–1980: Lancaster Red Roses

Career highlights
- As head coach: 4× EPBL/EBA champion (1951, 1969, 1971, 1977); 6× EPBL/EBA Coach of the Year (1963, 1965, 1969, 1971, 1972, 1977)

Stanley Novak (c. 1924 – October 21, 2006) was an American professional basketball player, coach and scout. He was a longtime fixture of the Continental Basketball Association (CBA), starting his career as a player with the Lancaster Red Roses in 1948 and spending the following four decades as head coach of various teams until his coaching retirement in 1980. Novak won four league championships and was a six-time Coach of the Year selection. He worked in the National Basketball Association (NBA) as director of scouting for the Detroit Pistons from 1980 to 1992 and Minnesota Timberwolves from 1992 to 1997.

== Early life ==
Novak was a native of West Philadelphia. He was a childhood friend of Jack McCloskey; the two would go on to be teammates on the Penn Quakers and Sunbury Mercuries, and worked together with the Detroit Pistons. Novak attended West Philadelphia High School where he led the team's basketball team to the Public League championship in 1941.

Novak played college basketball for the Penn Quakers. He was chosen as the team's most valuable player in 1944. Novak's collegiate career was interrupted by a stint as an officer in the United States Navy. He served as Quakers team captain during the 1947–48 season.

== Playing career ==
Novak played four games for the Lancaster Red Roses of the Eastern Professional Basketball League (EPBL) during the 1948–49 season. He played 70 games for the Sunbury Mercuries of the EPBL from 1949 to 1957 while he also served as the team's head coach.

== Coaching career ==
=== Penn ===
Novak coached the Penn Quakers freshman basketball team during the 1948–49 season.

=== Springfield Township HS ===
Novak served as the head coach of the basketball team at Springfield Township High School in Montgomery County, Pennsylvania, from 1949 to 1967 while he was also employed as a teacher. He accumulated a 245–89 record. Novak also coached the baseball, cross country and tennis teams.

=== EPBL/EBA/CBA ===
Novak was the head coach of the Sunbury Mercuries in the EPBL from 1949 to 1959. He stepped down as head coach in 1959 due to "family ties, teaching-coaching chores ... and officiating duties." Novak returned to the same position from 1960 to 1963. Novak moved to the Trenton Colonials for the 1963–64 season. He returned to the Sunbury Mercuries from 1964 to 1967.

Novak was head coach of the Wilkes-Barre Barons from 1967 to 1970. The Barons achieved 26 wins and 2 losses during the 1968–69 season which was a league-best record. He was head coach of the Scranton Apollos of the renamed Eastern Basketball Association (EBA) from 1970 to 1977. Novak joined the Allentown Jets for the 1977–78 season. He had his final coaching stint as head coach of the Lancaster Red Roses in the renamed Continental Basketball Association (CBA) during the 1979–80 season.

Novak won four championships: with the Mercuries in 1951, Barons in 1969, and with the Apollos in 1971 and 1977. He was named Coach of the Year six times: in 1963, 1965, 1969, 1971, 1972, and 1977. The CBA honored him by renaming the award to the "Stan Novak Coach of the Year Award". Several of his players embarked on successful coaching careers including Jack Ramsay, Jack McCloskey, Jim Boeheim and John Chaney.

Novak was announced as head coach of the EBA all-time team when the CBA celebrated its 50th anniversary in 1996.

Novak was inducted into the Philadelphia Jewish Sports Hall of Fame in 2000.

== Officiating career ==
Novak briefly worked as a collegiate referee during his EPBL career. He officiated a game between the Temple Owls and Saint Joseph's Hawks – coached respectively by "two of [his] best friends", Harry Litwack and Jack Ramsay – and made a decision that resulted in the outcome of the game; Novak reflected in a 1988 interview, "I felt so badly that I never refereed again."

== Scouting career ==
Novak was the director of scouting for the Detroit Pistons from 1980 to 1992. He convinced the Pistons to select Dennis Rodman in the second round of the 1986 NBA draft despite a poor performance at a predraft camp. Novak served as director of scouting for the Minnesota Timberwolves from 1992 until his retirement in 1997. Novak also provided the Utah Jazz with part-time scouting assignments.

== Personal life and death ==
Novak was married to Carolyn who worked as a physical education teacher. He had two children.

Novak died on October 21, 2006, of complications from a stroke at the age of 82.
