= Jerry Baskerville =

American basketball player (born 1951)

Personal information
- Born: November 10, 1951 (age 75) Philadelphia, Pennsylvania, U.S.
- Listed height: 6 ft 9 in (2.06 m)
- Listed weight: 196 lb (89 kg)

Career information
- High school: Thomas Edison (Philadelphia, Pennsylvania)
- College: UNLV (1971–1972); Temple (1973–1974)
- NBA draft: 1974: Supplemental round
- Drafted by: Boston Celtics
- Playing career: 1974–1981
- Position: Small forward
- Number: 44

Career history
- 1974–1977: Hazleton Bullets
- 1975–1976: Philadelphia 76ers
- 1976–1977: Scranton Apollos
- 1977–1978: Wilkes-Barre Barons
- 1979–1980: Rochester Zeniths
- 1980–1981: Atlantic City Hi-Rollers

Career highlights
- 2× EBA champion (1977, 1978); EBA Most Valuable Player (1975); All-EBA First Team (1975)
- Stats at NBA.com
- Stats at Basketball Reference

Jerry W. Baskerville (born November 10, 1951) is a retired American basketball player.

Born in Philadelphia, he played collegiately for the University of Nevada, Las Vegas and Temple University.

Baskerville was selected by the Boston Celtics as a supplemental pick in the 1974 NBA draft.

He played for the Philadelphia 76ers (1975–76) in the National Basketball Association for 21 games.

Baskerville played in the Eastern Basketball Association (EBA) / Continental Basketball Association (CBA) for the Hazleton Bullets, Scranton Apollos, Wilkes-Barre Barons, Rochester Zeniths and Atlantic City Hi-Rollers from 1974 to 1981. He was selected as the EBA Most Valuable Player and a member of the All-EBA First Team in 1975. Baskerville won EBA championships with the Apollos in 1977 and Barons in 1978.

== Career statistics ==
Legend
GP	Games played	GS	Games started	MPG	Minutes per game
FG%	Field goal percentage	3P%	3-point field goal percentage	FT%	Free throw percentage
RPG	Rebounds per game	APG	Assists per game	SPG	Steals per game
BPG	Blocks per game	PPG	Points per game	**Bold**	Career high

=== NBA ===
==== Regular season ====
Year	Team	GP	GS	MPG	FG%	FT%	RPG	APG	SPG	BPG	PPG
1975–76	Philadelphia	21	0	5.0	.308	.625	1.3	.1	.3	.2	1.2
