= Roman Turmon =

American basketball player

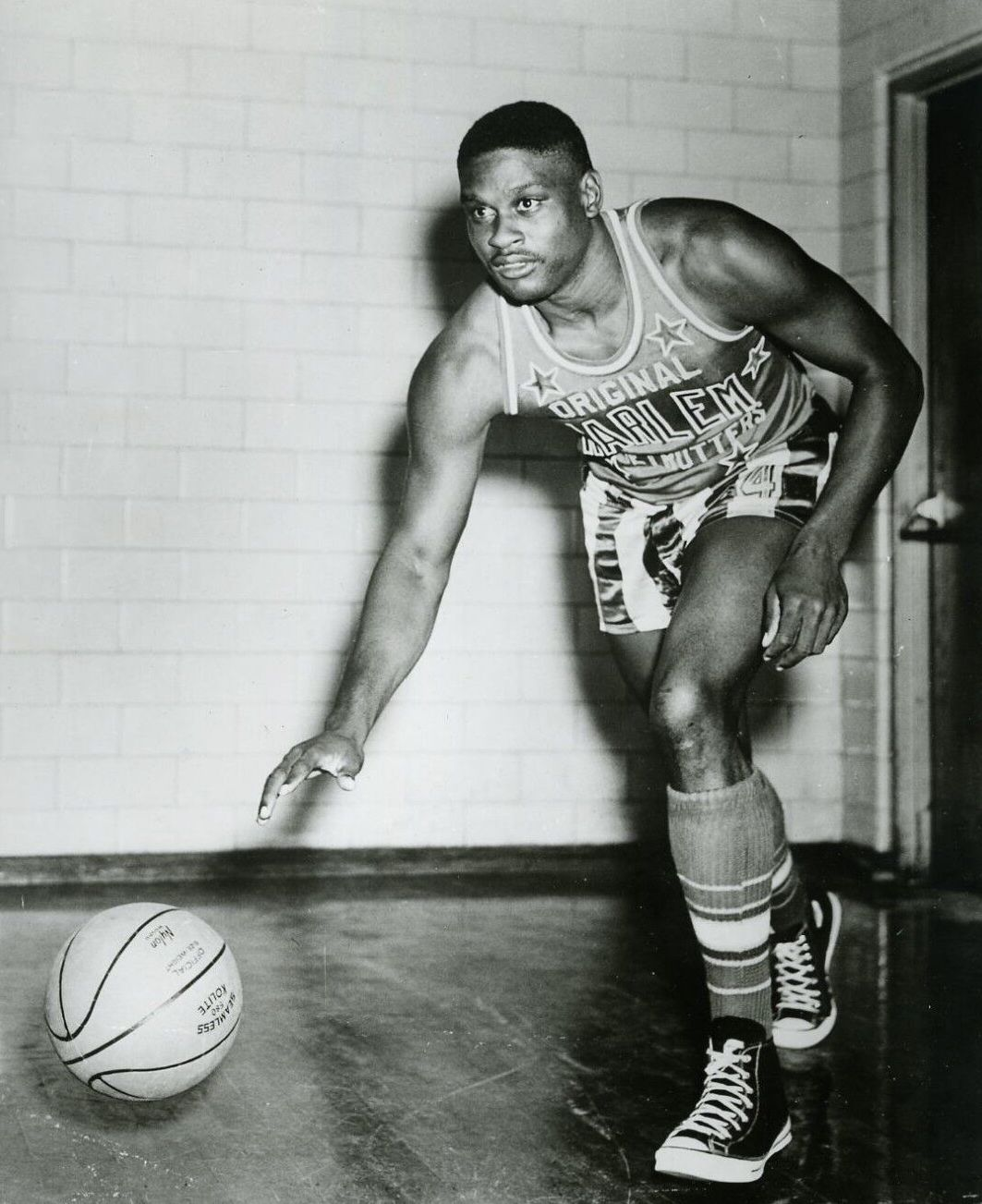
- Turmon with the Harlem Globetrotters in 1959

Personal information
- Born: March 14, 1933 Shady Dale, Georgia, U.S.
- Died: June 9, 2001 (aged 68) Manhattan, New York, U.S.
- Listed height: 6 ft 4 in (1.93 m)

Career information
- High school: Thomaston Training (Thomaston, Georgia)
- College: Clark Atlanta (1950–1954)
- NBA draft: 1954: undrafted
- Playing career: 1959–1964
- Position: Forward

Career history
- 1959–1964: Allentown Jets

Career highlights
- 2× EPBL champion (1962, 1963); EPBL Most Valuable Player (1962); 3× All-EPBL First Team (1961–1963); All-EPBL Second Team (1964)

Roman "Doc" Turmon (March 14, 1933 – June 9, 2001) was an American professional basketball player.

== High school and college career ==
Turmon was born on March 14, 1933, and was a native of Shady Dale, Georgia. He was a three-time all-state selection in basketball and football while he attended Thomaston Training School in Thomaston, Georgia. Turmon became the first athlete to receive a full scholarship to Clark College (now Clark Atlanta University). He was named all-conference in basketball, football and track and field specializing in shot put while at Clark. Turmon led the Southern Intercollegiate Athletic Conference (SIAC) tournament in scoring as a freshman in 1951. He helped lead the basketball team to the Southern Intercollegiate Athletic Conference (SIAC) championship in 1954. His 21.9 rebounds per game is the eighth highest career total in NCAA Division II history.

== Playing career ==
Turmon played for the Harlem Globetrotters and was named the team's most valuable player in 1958. He joined the Allentown Jets of the Eastern Professional Basketball League (EPBL) in 1959 and played with the team for five seasons. Turmon was named the EPBL Most Valuable Player in 1962 and earned four consecutive All-EPBL team appearances. Despite standing at only 6 ft 4 in (1.93 m), he led the league in rebounds for two seasons: 582 in 1960–61, and 538 in 1961–62. The Jets were EPBL champions in 1962 and 1963.

== Later life ==
In 1964, Turmon was reading The New York Times when he noticed an advertisement offering Chicken Delight franchises. He had been saving money from his athletic career for a future business investment and signed with Chicken Delight officials. Turmon opened his first store in Harlem, New York, and broke all records for opening-day sales in the chain. He and his brother-in-law opened a second store in Brooklyn. Turmon grossed $35,000 a month from his business in 1966. He operated the two franchises for 14 years.

Turmon died on June 9, 2001, in Manhattan, New York.

Turmon was inducted into the Georgia Sports Hall of Fame in 2009.
