= Jack McCloskey =

American basketball player and coach (1925–2017)

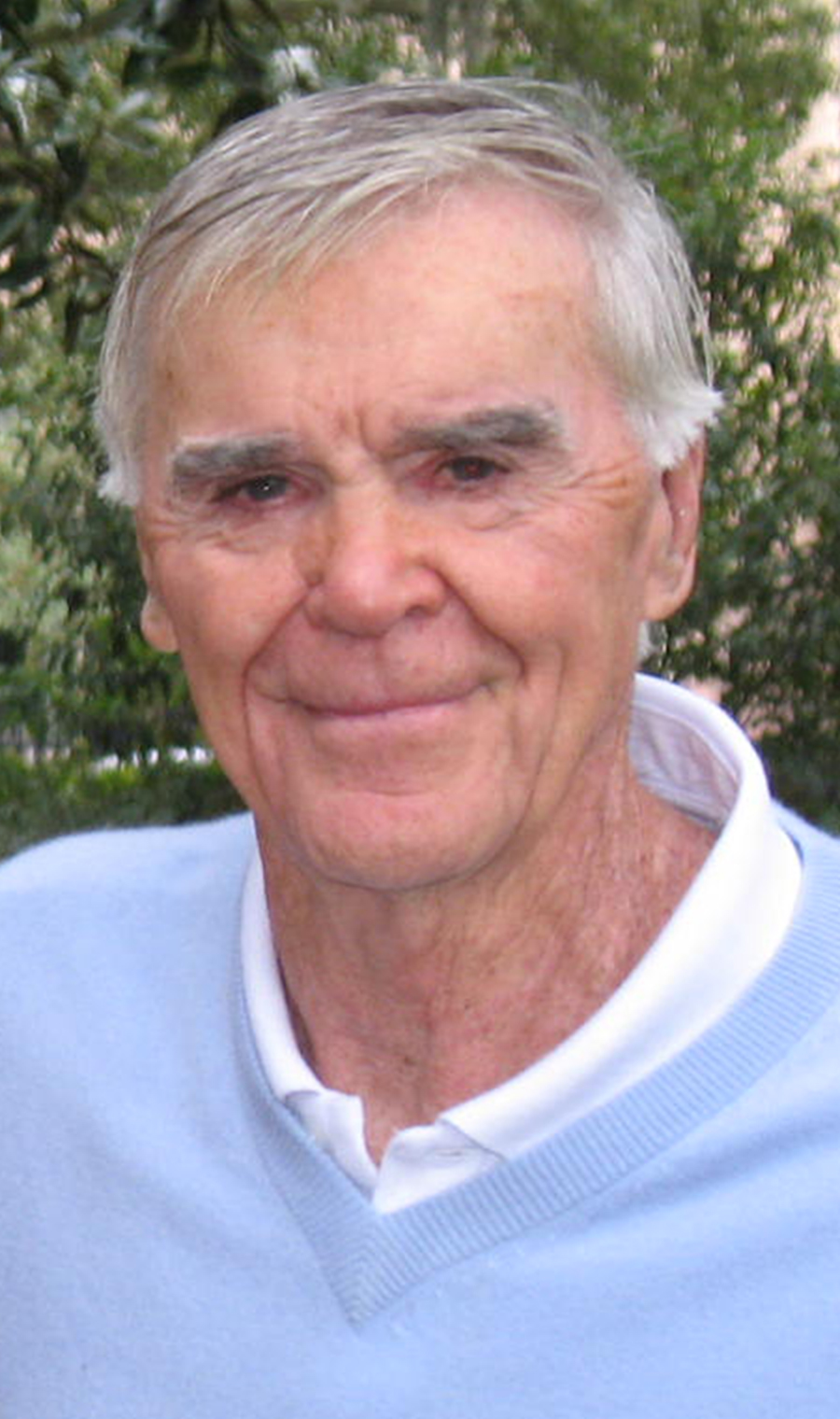
- McClosky in 2009

Personal information
- Born: September 19, 1925 Mahanoy City, Pennsylvania, U.S.
- Died: June 1, 2017 (aged 91) Savannah, Georgia, U.S.
- Listed height: 6 ft 2 in (1.88 m)
- Listed weight: 190 lb (86 kg)

Career information
- College: Penn (1943–1944)
- Playing career: 1947–1954
- Position: Shooting guard
- Coaching career: 1956–1974

Career history

Playing
- 1947–1948: Lancaster Red Roses
- 1948–1951: Pottsville Packers
- 1951–1954: Sunbury Mercuries
- 1953: Philadelphia Warriors

Coaching
- 1956–1966: Penn
- 1966–1972: Wake Forest
- 1972–1974: Portland Trail Blazers

Career highlights
- As player: EPBL champion (1949); 2× EPBL Most Valuable Player (1953, 1954); 4× All-EPBL First Team (1950, 1952–1954); As executive: 2× NBA champion (1989, 1990)
- Stats at NBA.com
- Stats at Basketball Reference

John William McCloskey (September 19, 1925 – June 1, 2017) was an American basketball player, coach and executive. He served as the head coach of the Portland Trail Blazers and general manager of the Detroit Pistons and Minnesota Timberwolves. As general manager of the Pistons, McCloskey assembled the team that would become known as the "Bad Boys" that won NBA championships in 1989 and 1990.

== Early life ==
McCloskey was born in Mahanoy City, Pennsylvania on September 19, 1925, to Buelah and Eddie McCloskey. After high school, he attended the University of Pittsburgh, where he played football. He left school to serve in World War II as a lieutenant commanding a landing ship for the Marines. After the war, McCloskey attended the University of Pennsylvania where he played three varsity sports.

== Playing career ==
McCloskey played one game for the Philadelphia Warriors of the NBA during the 1953 season, scoring 6 points in that game. McCloskey also spent time in Eastern Professional Basketball League (EPBL), including with the Sunbury Mercuries. He was the EPBL Most Valuable Player in 1953 and 1954, and earned four nominations to the All-EPBL First Team (1950, 1952–1954). McCloskey won an EPBL championship with the Pottsville Packers in 1949.

== Coaching career ==
McCloskey served as head coach of the University of Pennsylvania from 1956 to 1966, and of Wake Forest from 1966 to 1972. Following that, he served as the head coach of the Portland Trail Blazers from 1972 through 1974, earning a 48–116 win–loss record. He followed this stint as an assistant coach to Jerry West and the Los Angeles Lakers. When West became general manager in 1979, McCloskey felt he had earned the right to become head coach, but Jack McKinney was hired instead.

== Front-office career: "Trader Jack" ==
In 1979, McCloskey became general manager of the Detroit Pistons. Over the next 13 years, "Trader Jack", as he was known, made over 30 trades, constantly upgrading his team to become a true challenger to the Boston Celtics, one of the dominant teams in the NBA's Eastern Conference. His best-known moves were drafting future Hall-Of-Famer Joe Dumars outside the lottery and rebounding champ Dennis Rodman in the second round of the NBA Draft, trading three players for future all-star center and dominant rebounder Bill Laimbeer and trading superstar Adrian Dantley for Mark Aguirre during the 1988–89 season, a move that helped the Pistons win the NBA championship in 1989 and 1990.

After the Chicago Bulls swept the Pistons in the 1991 Eastern Conference Finals, "Trader Jack" made his last moves. He acquired Darrell Walker, Brad Sellers, and Orlando Woolridge, and let go of Vinnie Johnson and James Edwards to try to make the team younger. He drafted Doug Overton in the second round that year (the Pistons had traded their first-round pick away), who did not even play the following season. The Pistons struggled with their chemistry, as key subs like John Salley did not improve their performance, yet they won 48 games. They lost in five games to the New York Knicks in the first round, and McCloskey left the team. He later served in the front offices of the Minnesota Timberwolves (1992–1995), and the Toronto Raptors (2004), the latter on an interim basis.

== Personal life ==
On March 29, 2008, McCloskey had his name honored in Auburn Hills (Home city of The Detroit Pistons at the time), with a banner raised at The Palace of Auburn Hills.

McCloskey had six children. His daughter is the writer Molly McCloskey, whose memoir Circles Around the Sun: In Search of a Lost Brother (2011) recounts the story of the McCloskey family with particular focus on Molly's brother (Jack McCloskey's son), Mike. The family was featured in an article in the September 1953 Ladies Home Journal, as part of a long running series "How America Lives", titled "Meet Mrs. $10,000* Executive in the Home".

In May 2017, it was announced McCloskey had Alzheimer's disease. He died on June 1, 2017.

== Career playing statistics ==
Legend
GP	Games played	GS	Games started	MPG	Minutes per game
FG%	Field goal percentage	3P%	3-point field goal percentage	FT%	Free throw percentage
RPG	Rebounds per game	APG	Assists per game	SPG	Steals per game
BPG	Blocks per game	PPG	Points per game	**Bold**	Career high

=== NBA ===
==== Regular season ====
Year	Team	GP	MPG	FG%	FT%	RPG	APG	PPG
1952–53	Philadelphia	1	16.0	.333	–	3.0	1.0	6.0

== Head coaching record ==
=== College ===
Record table
Season	Team	Overall	Conference	Standing	Postseason
**Penn Quakers** (Ivy League) (1956–1966)
1956–57	Penn	7–19	3–11	7th	
1957–58	Penn	13–12	8–6	4th	
1958–59	Penn	12–14	5–9	5th	
1959–60	Penn	14–11	8–6	T–3rd	
1960–61	Penn	16–9	10–4	2nd	
1961–62	Penn	17–8	11–3	2nd	
1962–63	Penn	19–6	10–4	3rd	
1963–64	Penn	14–10	10–4	3rd	
1964–65	Penn	15–10	10–4	3rd	
1965–66	Penn	19–6	12–2	1st	
Penn:		146–105	87–53		
**Wake Forest Demon Deacons** (Atlantic Coast Conference) (1966–1972)
1966–67	Wake Forest	9–18	5–9	T–5th	
1967–68	Wake Forest	5–21	3–11	T–7th	
1968–69	Wake Forest	18–9	8–6	T–3rd	
1969–70	Wake Forest	14–13	6–8	5th	
1970–71	Wake Forest	16–10	7–7	4th	
1971–72	Wake Forest	8–18	3–9	6th	
Wake Forest:		70–89	32–50		
Total:		216–194			
National champion Postseason invitational champion Conference regular season champion Conference regular season and conference tournament champion Division regular season champion Division regular season and conference tournament champion Conference tournament champion

=== NBA ===
Legend
Regular season	G	Games coached	W	Games won	L	Games lost	W–L %	Win–loss %
Playoffs	PG	Playoff games	PW	Playoff wins	PL	Playoff losses	PW–L %	Playoff win–loss %

Team	Year	G	W	L	W–L%	Finish	PG	PW	PL	PW–L%	Result
Portland	1972–73	82	21	61	.256	5th in Pacific	–	–	–	–	Missed Playoffs
Portland	1973–74	82	27	55	.329	5th in Pacific	–	–	–	–	Missed Playoffs
**Career**		164	48	116	.293		–	–	–	–	
