= Brendan McCann =

American basketball player (1935–2024)

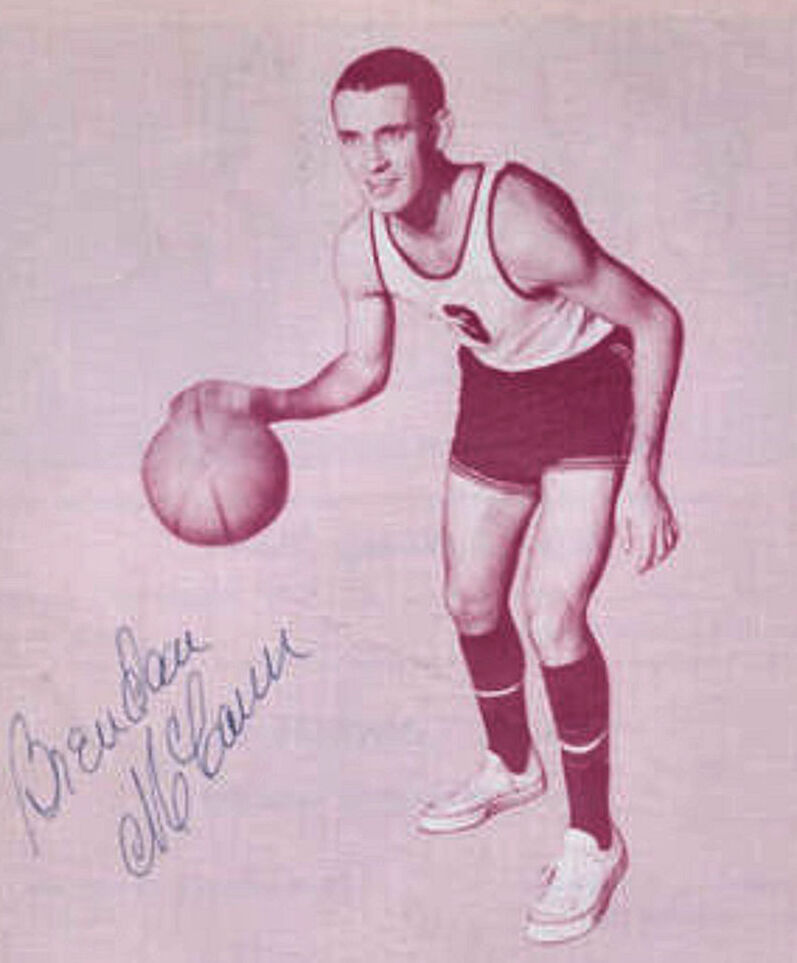
- McCann with the Allentown Jets in 1961

Personal information
- Born: July 5, 1935 Brooklyn, New York, U.S.
- Died: November 5, 2024 (aged 89) Pembroke Pines, Florida, U.S.
- Listed height: 6 ft 2 in (1.88 m)
- Listed weight: 178 lb (81 kg)

Career information
- High school: Manual Training (Brooklyn, New York)
- College: St. Bonaventure (1954–1957)
- NBA draft: 1957: 1st round, 5th overall pick
- Drafted by: New York Knicks
- Playing career: 1957–1966
- Position: Point guard
- Number: 3
- Coaching career: 1961–1970

Career history

Playing
- 1957–1960: New York Knicks
- 1958–1963, 1964–1966: Wilmington / Allentown Jets

Coaching
- 1961–1963, 1964–1965, 1969–1970: Allentown Jets

Career highlights
- As player: 3× EPBL champion (1962, 1963, 1965); As head coach: 3× EPBL champion (1962, 1963, 1965)

Career NBA statistics
- Points: 74 (1.8 ppg)
- Rebounds: 50 (1.2 rpg)
- Assists: 65 (1.6 apg)
- Stats at NBA.com
- Stats at Basketball Reference

Brendan Michael McCann (July 5, 1935 – November 5, 2024) was an American professional basketball player and coach. McCann was selected in the 1957 NBA draft (first round, fifth overall) by the New York Knicks after a collegiate career at St. Bonavanture. He played for the Knicks for three seasons. McCann played in the Eastern Professional Basketball League (EPBL) for the Wilmington / Allentown Jets from 1957 to 1966. McCann was also head coach of the Jets from 1961 to 1963 and during the 1964–65 and 1969–70 seasons. He led the Jets to EPBL championships in 1962, 1963 and 1965.

McCann was the varsity basketball coach at North Babylon High School from 1961 to 1967. His first two years, the team's record was 4 wins and 14 losses. In the 1963–1964 season, the team record was 13 wins and 5 losses and he coached the Bulldogs to their first county playoff game. For the next three years, North Babylon had winning records and went to the county playoffs.

He was inducted into the Suffolk County Sport's Hall of Fame in the late 1990s.

McCann died on November 5, 2024, at the age of 89.

== Career statistics ==
Legend
GP	Games played	GS	Games started	MPG	Minutes per game
FG%	Field goal percentage	3P%	3-point field goal percentage	FT%	Free throw percentage
RPG	Rebounds per game	APG	Assists per game	SPG	Steals per game
BPG	Blocks per game	PPG	Points per game	**Bold**	Career high

=== NBA ===
==== Regular season ====
Year	Team	GP	MPG	FG%	FT%	RPG	APG	PPG
1957–58	New York	**36**	**8.2**	**.220**	.676	**1.3**	1.5	**1.9**
1958–59	New York	1	7.0	.000	–	1.0	1.0	.0
1959–60	New York	4	7.3	.100	**1.000**	1.0	**2.5**	1.3
Career		41	8.1	.204	.700	1.2	1.6	1.8
