= Jeff McInnis =

American basketball player (born 1974)

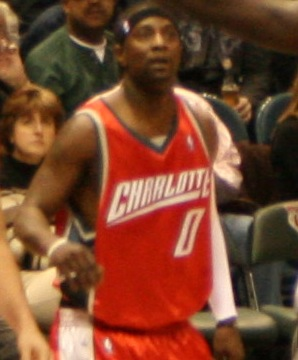

Charleston Cougars
- Title: Assistant coach
- Conference: CAA

Personal information
- Born: October 22, 1974 (age 52) Charlotte, North Carolina, U.S.
- Listed height: 6 ft 4 in (1.93 m)
- Listed weight: 190 lb (86 kg)

Career information
- High school: West Charlotte (Charlotte, North Carolina); Oak Hill Academy (Mouth of Wilson, Virginia)
- College: North Carolina (1993–1996)
- NBA draft: 1996: 2nd round, 37th overall pick
- Drafted by: Denver Nuggets
- Playing career: 1996–2008
- Position: Point guard / shooting guard
- Number: 5, 10, 0
- Coaching career: 2024–present

Career history

Playing
- 1996: Denver Nuggets
- 1996–1997: Panionios
- 1997–1999: Quad City Thunder
- 1999: Washington Wizards
- 1999–2000: Quad City Thunder
- 2000–2002: Los Angeles Clippers
- 2002–2004: Portland Trail Blazers
- 2004–2005: Cleveland Cavaliers
- 2005–2007: New Jersey Nets
- 2007–2008: Charlotte Bobcats

Career highlights
- CBA champion (1998); CBA Most Valuable Player (2000); All-CBA First Team (2000); All-CBA Second Team (1998); CBA All-Defensive Team (1998); CBA Newcomer of the Year (1998); Second-team All-ACC (1996); Third-team All-ACC (1995); Third-team Parade All-American (1993); McDonald's All-American (1993)

Career NBA statistics
- Points: 5,396 (9.4 ppg)
- Rebounds: 1,170 (2.0 rpg)
- Assists: 2,514 (4.4 apg)
- Stats at NBA.com
- Stats at Basketball Reference

Jeffery Lemans McInnis (born October 22, 1974) is an American basketball coach and former professional player who was most recently an assistant coach for the Charleston Cougars men's team. He played in the National Basketball Association (NBA), in Greece and in the Continental Basketball Association (CBA).

== Playing career ==
After his junior year playing for the University of North Carolina at Chapel Hill, McInnis was selected by the Denver Nuggets in the second round of the 1996 NBA draft. He played three seasons for the Quad City Thunder of the Continental Basketball Association (CBA) from 1997 to 2000. He also won a CBA championship with the Thunder in 1998. He was selected as the CBA Newcomer of the Year and named to the All-CBA Second Team and All-Defensive Team in 1998. He was chosen as the CBA Most Valuable Player and a member of the All-CBA First Team in 2000.

All together, during his NBA career, McInnis would play for the Nuggets, the New Jersey Nets, the Cleveland Cavaliers, the Portland Trail Blazers, the Los Angeles Clippers, and the Washington Wizards.

For the 2005–06 season, the New Jersey Nets acquired McInnis, a free agent, mainly to back up star point guard Jason Kidd. McInnis played limited minutes, and tore left-knee cartilage on January 15, resulting in significant missed significant time.

Ahead of his return for the 2006 playoffs, the Nets kept McInnis inactive. The team's attempts to negotiate a contract buyout or a trade before the new season were unsuccessful, leaving McInnis in limbo -- on the roster but exiled -- early in the 2006–07 season.

On January 3, 2007, the Charlotte Bobcats received McInnis from the Nets in a trade for Bernard Robinson and cash considerations. McInnis, who would play 38 games for Charlotte, averaging 4.3 points and 3.3 assists per game, was waived by the Bobcats on February 29, 2008.

== Coaching career ==
In 2009, McInnis founded the AAU organization Team Charlotte. In 2015, he won the 17U National Coach of the Year honors. In 2019, he became national head basketball coach at Combine Academy in Lincolnton, North Carolina. His time there ended in 2022.

In April 2024 Chris Mack hired McInnis as an assistant coach for the Charleston Cougars, his first collegiate coaching position.

On December 2, 2025, McInnis and the College of Charleston mutually agreed to part ways. His position on the team will be filled at the conclusion of the 2025-2026 season.
