= Andre McCarter =

American basketball player

Personal information
- Born: August 25, 1953 (age 73) Philadelphia, Pennsylvania, U.S.
- Listed height: 6 ft 3 in (1.91 m)
- Listed weight: 190 lb (86 kg)

Career information
- High school: Overbrook (Philadelphia, Pennsylvania)
- College: UCLA (1973–1976)
- NBA draft: 1976: 6th round, 89th overall pick
- Drafted by: Kansas City Kings
- Playing career: 1976–1983
- Position: Point guard
- Number: 20, 33
- Coaching career: 1979–1980

Career history

Playing
- 1976–1977: Kansas City Kings
- 1978–1979: Rochester Zeniths
- 1979: Maine Lumberjacks
- 1980: Utica Olympics
- 1980–1982: Atlantic City Hi-Rollers
- 1980–1981: Washington Bullets
- 1982–1983: Pantterit

Coaching
- 1979–1980: Maine Lumberjacks

Career highlights
- CBA champion (1979); CBA Most Valuable Player (1979); CBA All-Star Game MVP (1979); All-CBA First Team (1979); All-CBA Second Team (1980); CBA Newcomer of the Year (1979); 3× CBA assists leader (1979, 1980, 1982); NCAA champion (1975); First-team Parade All-American (1971)
- Stats at NBA.com
- Stats at Basketball Reference

Andre McCarter (born August 25, 1953) is an American retired professional basketball player. He played college basketball for the UCLA Bruins.

== College career ==
A 6'3" guard born in Philadelphia, McCarter attended the University of California, Los Angeles, and played for the Bruins under head coach John Wooden.

== Professional career ==
McCarter played three seasons in the National Basketball Association (NBA) for the Kansas City Kings and Washington Bullets. NBA.

McCarter played in the Continental Basketball Association (CBA) for the Rochester Zeniths, Maine Lumberjacks, Utica Olympics and Atlantic City Hi-Rollers from 1978 to 1982. During his first season with the Zeniths in 1978–79, he was selected as the CBA Most Valuable Player, CBA Newcomer of the Year, and CBA All-Star Game MVP and was selected to the All-CBA First Team. He won a CBA championship with the Zeniths in 1979. McCarter was selected to the All-CBA Second Team in 1980. He served as head coach of the Lumberjacks during the 1979–80 season and accumulated a 2–2 record.

== Career statistics ==
Legend
GP	Games played	GS	Games started	MPG	Minutes per game
FG%	Field goal percentage	3P%	3-point field goal percentage	FT%	Free throw percentage
RPG	Rebounds per game	APG	Assists per game	SPG	Steals per game
BPG	Blocks per game	PPG	Points per game	**Bold**	Career high

=== NBA ===
==== Regular season ====
Year	Team	GP	MPG	FG%	3P%	FT%	RPG	APG	SPG	BPG	PPG
1976–77	Kansas City	**59**	**12.3**	**.463**		.711	.9	**1.7**	**.4**	.0	**4.6**
1977–78	Kansas City	1	9.0	.000		–	**1.0**	.0	.0	.0	.0
1980–81	Washington	43	10.4	.378	.250	**.750**	.9	**1.7**	.3	.0	2.8
Career		103	11.5	.431	.250	.725	.9	1.7	.4	.0	3.8
