= Tony Coma =

American former basketball coach

Biographical details
- Died: December 5, 1994 (aged 63)
- Education: Temple University

Coaching career (HC unless noted)

Men's basketball
- 1959–1965: John Bartram HS (PA)
- 1968–1969: Wilmington Blue Bombers
- 1969: Allentown Jets
- 1969–1972: Cheyney State
- 1972–1974: Cornell

Women's basketball
- 1976–1989: Murrell Dobbins Tech (PA)
- 1991–1992: Academy Park HS (PA)

Accomplishments and honors

Championships
- Philadelphia Public League boys' basketball champion (1961); 3x Philadelphia Public League girls' basketball champion (1986, 1987, 1988)

Anthony S. Coma was an American basketball coach who was the head men's basketball coach at Cornell University from 1972 to 1974. He also coached high school basketball in Philadelphia, where his players included future Basketball Hall of Famers Earl Monroe and Dawn Staley.

== Early life ==
Coma played basketball and baseball at Central High School and Temple University and signed a minor league contract with the St. Louis Cardinals. He received his bachelor's degree in 1953, a master's in education in 1955, and his doctorate in 1964.

== Coaching ==
He coached basketball and baseball at John Bartram High School. His basketball teams compiled a 112-40 record and won the 1961 Philadelphia Public League championship. His players included Earl Monroe, Chris Kefalos, Clarence Brookins, Richie Moore, and Bobby Lewis. His baseball teams posted a 136–43 record and won three city championships (1960, 1961, 1963).

In 1965, he left the School District of Philadelphia to become director of physical education at Cheyney State College. He was the head coach of the Eastern Pennsylvania Basketball League's Wilmington Blue Bombers during the 1968–69 season and led the club to a 20–7 record and an appearance in the league finals. He started the following season with the EPBL's Allentown Jets, but resigned to become the men's basketball coach at Cheyney State after Harold Blitman left the team one day before the start of the season to become head coach of the Miami Floridians of the American Basketball Association. In his three seasons under Coma, Cheyney State amassed a 75–15 record and won the Penn State College Athletic Conference championships in 1971 and 1972.

In July 1972, Coma was named coach of the Cornell Big Red men's basketball team. He inherited a team that went 5–19 the previous season and had five of its six black players quit due to alleged discrimination. However, the team had high hopes for the 1972–73 season after upsetting Penn State in the home opener. The team's leading scorer and rebounder, Brian Wright, quit after five games after a confrontation with Coma. During a 78-48 loss to Penn at the Palestra, guard John O'Neill left the gym after being benched and substitute Doug Murken, upset with his lack of playing time in his hometown, refused to enter the game. Afterwards, they criticized Coma to a reporter and was Murken kicked off the team. Cornell ended the season with a 4–22 record and finished last in the Ivy League. Cornell started the following season with a 3–14 record and Coma resigned on February 7, 1974. According to The Cornell Daily Sun, prior to his departure, players had complained to school administrators that Coma drank heavily, had a poor relationship with the players, and was mismanaging university money. On February 21, 1974, director of athletics Jon Anderson announced that coaches had used money earmarked for travel to pay the admission application fees for prospective basketball players in violation National Collegiate Athletic Association rules.

After leaving Cornell, Coma coached girls' basketball at Murrell Dobbins Tech. He coached Linda Page, who broke Wilt Chamberlain's record for the most points scored by a high school basketball player in Philadelphia. His 1985–86, 1986–87, and 1987–88 teams, led by Dawn Staley, won the Philadelphia Public League championship. In 1991, he came out of retirement to coach the girls' basketball team at Academy Park High School in his hometown of Sharon Hill, Pennsylvania. He died on December 5, 1994.
