= Julius McCoy =

American basketball player (1932-2008)

Personal information
- Born: February 21, 1932 Cheraw, South Carolina, U.S.
- Died: April 4, 2008 (aged 76) Harrisburg, Pennsylvania, U.S.
- Listed height: 6 ft 3 in (1.91 m)

Career information
- High school: Farrell (Farrell, Pennsylvania)
- College: Michigan State (1953–1956)
- NBA draft: 1956: 7th round, 56th overall pick
- Drafted by: St. Louis Hawks
- Position: Shooting guard / small forward
- Coaching career: 1962–1963, 1967–1969

Career history

Playing
- 1958–1964: Williamsport Billies
- 1964–1970: Sunbury Mercuries
- 1970: Wilkes-Barre Barons

Coaching
- 1962–1963: Williamsport Billies
- 1967–1969: Sunbury Mercuries

Career highlights
- EPBL Most Valuable Player (1966); 6× All-EPBL First Team (1959, 1963–1967); All-EPBL Second Team (1968); EPBL Rookie of the Year (1959); Third-team All-American – AP, UPI (1956); First-team All-Big Ten (1956)
- Stats at Basketball Reference

Julius L. McCoy (February 21, 1932 – April 4, 2008) was an American basketball player. He was an All-American college player at Michigan State University and went on to become the all-time leading scorer in the Eastern Basketball Association (later known as the Continental Basketball Association).

McCoy played for Farrell High School in Farrell, Pennsylvania, where he led the team to the 1952 Pennsylvania State championship. He scored 1,471 career points for Farrell, a record that still stood at the time of his death in 2008. An undersized forward in high school, he was the tallest player on the 1952 squad at just over six feet tall.

He was recruited by Michigan State to play college football by then-assistant Duffy Daugherty, and chose the Spartans because he would have the opportunity to play basketball, which he ultimately chose to pursue. Nicknamed "Hooks" for the size of his hands, McCoy played for coach Pete Newell and was an immediate impact player as a sophomore. He averaged 18.6 points per game, a mark which dipped to 16.7 the following year. In his senior season, McCoy broke out, scoring 27.3 points per game – good for second in the Big Ten Conference behind Robin Freeman of Ohio State. At the close of his senior campaign, McCoy was named a third-team All-American by both the Associated Press and United Press International and was selected first-team All-Big Ten.

After the close of his college career, McCoy was drafted by the St. Louis Hawks in the 1956 NBA draft. However, he was also drafted into the U.S. Army and served in the military, resuming his basketball career with the Williamsport Billies of the Eastern Professional Basketball League (EBPL) in 1958. He averaged 24.3 points in the 1958–59 season and earned EPBL Rookie of the Year honors. He played twelve seasons in the league, primarily for the Billies and the Sunbury Mercuries, and was the all-time leading scorer in the league's history (prior to it becoming the Continental Basketball Association in 1977) and won the league MVP award in 1966. McCoy served as head coach of the Billies during the 1962–63 season and the Mercuries from 1967 to 1969. In 1995, McCoy was named to the CBA's 50th anniversary team.

After the conclusion of his playing career, McCoy served as a teacher and head boys' coach for John Harris High School in Harrisburg, Pennsylvania from 1971 to 1983. He then worked in the Pennsylvania Bureau of Transportation until his retirement in 2004. McCoy died of complications from diabetes on April 4, 2008, at age 76.
