= Asbury Park Boardwalkers =

- League: Eastern Professional Basketball League
- Founded: 1966
- Folded: 1968
- Arena: Asbury Park Convention Hall
- Location: Asbury Park, New Jersey

The Asbury Park Boardwalkers were an American basketball team based in Asbury Park, New Jersey that was a member of the Eastern Professional Basketball League.

The team began play for the 1966-67 season at Asbury Park Convention Hall. In the team's first season, the franchise won only two games in a 28-game season - and went through three coaches. The only bright spot during this season was when, after the season ended, the Boardwalker's top player, Dennis Cuff, received the Eastern League's John F. Kennedy Sportsmanship Award.

Although the Boardwalkers started off strong for the 1967-68 season, the team's attendance suffered. In one road game against the Binghamton Flyers, the team showed up with only four players, causing the team's equipment manager to suit up and play - despite being 20 years older than most of the players on the floor.

After the 1967-68 season, the franchise relocated to Springfield, Massachusetts and became the Springfield Hall of Famers.

== Year-by-year ==
| Year | League | Reg. season | Playoffs |
|---|---|---|---|
| 1966/67 | EPBL | 5th, Eastern | Did not qualify |
| 1967/68 | EPBL | 8th | Did not qualify |
