= Vincent Askew =

American basketball player-coach

Personal information
- Born: February 28, 1966 (age 60) Memphis, Tennessee, U.S.
- Listed height: 6 ft 6 in (1.98 m)
- Listed weight: 235 lb (107 kg)

Career information
- High school: Frayser (Memphis, Tennessee)
- College: Memphis (1984–1987)
- NBA draft: 1987: 2nd round, 39th overall pick
- Drafted by: Philadelphia 76ers
- Playing career: 1987–1999
- Position: Shooting guard / small forward
- Number: 30, 4, 7, 17, 2

Career history

Playing
- 1987–1988: Philadelphia 76ers
- 1987–1988: Savannah Spirits
- 1988–1990: Albany Patroons
- 1989: Arimo Bologna
- 1989: Memphis Rockers
- 1990–1991: Emmezeta Udine
- 1990: Formula Shell
- 1991–1992: Golden State Warriors
- 1992: Sidis Reggio Emilia
- 1992: Sacramento Kings
- 1992–1996: Seattle SuperSonics
- 1996: New Jersey Nets
- 1996–1997: Indiana Pacers
- 1997: Denver Nuggets
- 1997–1998: Portland Trail Blazers
- 1998: Idaho Stampede
- 1998–1999: Cocodrilos de Caracas

Coaching
- 2007–2008: Albany Patroons

Career highlights
- 2× CBA Most Valuable Player (1990, 1991); CBA All-Star Game MVP (1991); 2× All-CBA First Team (1990, 1991); CBA All-Defensive Team (1991); World Basketball League All-Star (1990); MVP WBL All-Star Game MVP (1990); First-team All-Metro Conference (1987)
- Stats at NBA.com
- Stats at Basketball Reference

Vincent Jerome Askew (born February 28, 1966) is an American former professional basketball player who played for nine seasons in the National Basketball Association (NBA) for eight different teams. A 6'6" guard-forward, Askew played college basketball for the Memphis State Tigers. He was raised by his grandmother who had 13 kids and custody of Askew and three cousins.

== College career ==
Askew was a Frayser High School graduate before enrolling at Memphis State University. He was a key player on the Tigers' 1984–85 squad that reached the Final Four. Askew was one of the more complete players on the team, capable of banging down low one possession and running the point the next. Vincent Askew was named to the Metro All-Freshman Team.

After the Final Four season, Askew found himself in the midst of a debate on NCAA regulations when he briefly considered transferring to Kansas.

In October 1986, Vincent Askew was involved in a possible transfer to the University of Kansas. He did not transfer, and re-enrolled at Memphis State University in the fall of 1986. While Askew was visiting the Jayhawks, then-coach Larry Brown provided Askew with a plane ticket to fly back to Memphis to see his dying grandmother. The purchase of the plane ticket violated NCAA rules and Kansas was served with NCAA sanctions because of their recruitment of Askew, mainly involving "improper recruiting inducements totaling at least $1,244 to the above-mentioned young man."

Askew left after three seasons with the Tigers.

== NBA career ==
Askew was picked by the Philadelphia 76ers in the second round (39th overall) of the 1987 NBA draft. He was waived after 14 games, then spent three weeks with the Washington Bullets, and then drafted into the Continental Basketball Association.

He was brought back to the NBA by the Golden State Warriors to finish the 1991 season, then he went to the Sacramento Kings for part of a season, then drifted to the Seattle SuperSonics. For four years in Seattle, he contributed about six points, four rebounds, and two assists per game. Then, he was traded to the New Jersey Nets, played one game there, then was traded to the Indiana Pacers. Larry Brown, then of the Pacers, described his trade for Askew as "I don't know of too many guys in the league who are better defenders than him, and not everybody is as unselfish. He doesn't worry about minutes, doesn't worry about shots, he just worries about winning."

He also had stints with the Denver Nuggets and the Portland Trail Blazers, where he was waived for a final time in the 1997–1998 season.

Askew was described as a 6-foot-6 do-everything team player who played in the post and the perimeter and was a steady defensive stopper who built a reliable jumper late in his career. The most he has ever scored in an NBA game is 21 points. In his NBA career, Askew played in 467 games and scored a total of 3,313 points. He averaged 7.1 points, 2.5 rebounds, 2.2 assists in 20 minutes per game.

== Professional career outside the NBA ==
Askew is the only player to be named Most Valuable Player in two straight years (1990 and 1991) in the Continental Basketball Association (CBA). He was selected to the All-CBA First Team in 1990 and 1991 and All-Defensive Team in 1991. He also had a stint in the World Basketball League.

Askew also played in Italy for Serie A team Arimo Bologna (1989) and Serie A2 teams Emmezeta Udine (1990–1991) and Sidis Reggio Emilia (1992).

After the NBA, Askew had some difficulties establishing himself. European basketball records indicate that at least three times he signed with various teams but refused to play with them, ending in August 2001 when he signed a contract with Roseto, but did not come to Italy. Askew, according to an undated Euroleague scouting report, "is an NBA veteran that has finally, according to many, reached maturity. Vincent still has a lot of basketball left in him and wants to show the basketball people in Europe that he is indeed a reliable person. He is also in debt $10,000 to Vernon Maxwell. "

== Retirement ==
Upon his release from Portland in 1998, Askew returned to his hometown of Memphis, completed a degree in marketing and did some scouting for Memphis coach John Calipari, which piqued his interest in coaching.

He confided in George Karl, his long-time mentor from his Sonics days, and was told to go overseas. Askew went to Europe, where he coached in an Italian league for three years.

Askew took the head coaching job at Elliston Baptist Academy in Memphis, but was embattled to leave the job. Allegations that he had used ineligible players had landed the school in hot water with the Tennessee Secondary School Athletic Association, potentially costing them a chance to play in the postseason, and Askew's players were not pleased with his abrasive coaching methods.

In 2004, Askew accepted the head coaching position at Rossville Christian Academy. Askew again stirred some controversy by recruiting players, which is a clear Mississippi Private School Association (MPSA) violation, but Askew did lead the RCA Rebels to the Class A State Championship.

In 2005, he contacted the ABA expansion team Tacoma Navigators' owner Michael Tuckman. Askew got a chance to hone his raw coaching skills, while the Navigators, which plays its home games at Mount Tahoma High School, marketed its coach as a former Sonic.

Askew served as head coach of the Albany Patroons in the CBA during the 2007–08 season and accumulated a 21–27 record.

In 2014, Askew hosted "Holiday Hoop It Up" in Memphis, Tennessee Askew also tells his story about "Going Public" with God and getting baptized

Askew was listed by CBS Los Angeles as "10 Biggest NBA Trade Deadline Deals"

== Career playing statistics ==
Legend
GP	Games played	GS	Games started	MPG	Minutes per game
FG%	Field goal percentage	3P%	3-point field goal percentage	FT%	Free throw percentage
RPG	Rebounds per game	APG	Assists per game	SPG	Steals per game
BPG	Blocks per game	PPG	Points per game	**Bold**	Career high

=== NBA ===
==== Regular season ====
Year	Team	GP	GS	MPG	FG%	3P%	FT%	RPG	APG	SPG	BPG	PPG
1987–88	Philadelphia	14	2	16.7	.297	–	.727	1.6	2.4	.7	**.4**	3.7
1990–91	Golden State	7	0	12.1	.480	–	.818	1.6	1.9	.3	.0	4.7
1991–92	Golden State	**80**	**10**	18.7	.509	.100	.694	2.9	2.4	.6	.3	6.2
1992–93	Sacramento	9	0	8.4	.471	–	.733	1.2	.6	.2	.1	3.0
1992–93	Seattle	64	4	16.5	.493	.333	.701	2.3	1.8	.6	.3	6.0
1993–94	Seattle	**80**	3	21.1	.481	.194	.829	2.3	2.4	**.9**	.2	9.1
1994–95	Seattle	71	1	24.2	.492	.330	.739	2.5	**2.5**	.7	.2	**9.9**
1995–96	Seattle	69	2	**25.0**	.493	**.337**	.764	**3.2**	2.4	.7	.2	8.4
1996–97	New Jersey	1	0	7.0	–	–	–	.0	.0	.0	.0	.0
1996–97	Indiana	41	0	20.0	.432	.292	.791	2.4	2.2	.4	.1	5.7
1996–97	Denver	1	0	9.0	**.667**	–	**1.000**	.0	.0	.0	.0	6.0
1997–98	Portland	30	5	14.8	.352	.000	.718	2.3	1.3	.6	.2	2.2
Career		467	27	20.0	.479	.300	.754	2.5	2.2	.7	.2	7.1

==== Playoffs ====
Year	Team	GP	GS	MPG	FG%	3P%	FT%	RPG	APG	SPG	BPG	PPG
1991	Golden State	6	0	6.8	.400	–	.500	1.8	.3	.3	.0	2.5
1992	Golden State	4	0	7.5	.125	–	–	1.0	1.3	.0	.0	.5
1993	Seattle	12	0	8.6	**.561**	–	.696	1.6	.8	.1	.1	5.2
1994	Seattle	5	0	19.0	.357	.000	**.842**	1.2	1.8	.4	.0	7.2
1995	Seattle	4	0	**23.3**	.414	**.800**	.667	**3.8**	**2.0**	**.8**	.0	**7.5**
1996	Seattle	**19**	0	18.2	.343	.261	.607	2.2	1.4	.7	**.4**	3.7
Career		50	0	14.1	.398	.345	.684	1.9	1.2	.4	.2	4.3
