= Hartford Capitols =

The Hartford Capitols were a professional basketball team in the Eastern Professional Basketball League (later renamed the Eastern Basketball Association) from 1966 through 1974. The Capitols played on weekends only and played at various venues around the city, including the University of Hartford, Hartford Public High School and Bloomfield High School.

Notable players who played with the Capitols included Gene Conley, Art Heyman and K.C. Jones.

The Capitols went out of business in 1974, shortly after winning their first and only league championship. They were owned by Mark C. Yellin, a local attorney.

== Year-by-year ==
Year	League	Gp	W	L	Pct.	Reg. season	Playoffs
1966-67	EPBL	28	13	15	.464	2nd, Eastern	Lost to Wilmington Blue Bombers in Eastern Division Finals
1967-68	EPBL	32	21	11	.656	2nd, EPBL	Lost to Wilkes-Barre Barons in EPBL Semi-Finals
1968-69	EPBL	26	11	15	.423	3rd, Eastern	Lost to Wilmington Blue Bombers in Eastern Division Finals
1969-70	EPBL	27	15	12	.556	4th, EPBL	Lost to Wilmington Blue Bombers in EPBL Semi-Finals
1970-71	EBA	28	15	13	.536	2nd, Eastern	Lost to Hamden Bics in North Division Finals
1971-72	EBA	30	17	13	.556	T-2nd, EBA	Lost to Scranton Apollos in EBA Semi-Finals
1972-73	EBA	32	25	7	.781	1st, EBA	Lost to Wilkes-Barre Barons in EBA Championship Series
1973-74	EBA	27	19	8	.704	1st, Eastern	Won EBA Championship
Totals	EPBL	113	60	53	.531		
Totals	EBA	117	76	41	.650		
Totals	Franchise	230	136	94	.591		
