= Allentown Jets =

- Leagues: EPBL (1958–1970); EBA (1970–78); CBA (1978–1981)
- Founded: 1957 (as Wilmington Jets)
- Folded: 1981
- History: Wilmington Jets (1957–1958); Allentown Jets (1958–1979); Lehigh Valley Jets (1979–1981)
- Arena: Rockne Hall at Allentown Central Catholic High School
- Location: Allentown, Pennsylvania, U.S.
- Team colors: blue, orange, white
- Championships: 8 1962, 1963, 1965, 1968, 1970, 1972, 1975, 1976
- Division titles: 11 1961, 1962, 1963, 1964, 1968, 1970, 1972, 1974, 1976, 1977, 1980

The Allentown Jets were a minor league basketball team that played in the Eastern Professional Basketball League and later the Eastern Basketball Association and Continental Basketball Association from 1958 to 1981. The team was one of the most successful franchises in CBA/Eastern League history, winning eight playoff championships and 12 division titles.

== History ==
The team was founded as the Wilmington Jets in Wilmington, Delaware in 1957. The following year, in 1958, it relocated to Allentown, Pennsylvania. Among the Jets' top players were center Roman Turmon, NBA player and coach Ray Scott, scorer-rebounder Harthorne Wingo, and three-point specialist Brendan McCann.

The Delaware Sports Museum and Hall of Fame inducted Richard Koffenberger, who played for the team in Wilmington. The Jets' PR maestro, Johnny Kimock navigated this successful transition, making the Jets one of the elite EBL teams. In 1964, the Jets played an interleague contest with the Grand Rapids Tackers of the Midwest Professional Basketball League. The Jets won 138–136, winning the only minor league "World Series of Basketball" interpromotional game ever held. The Jets had a working agreement with the New York Knicks, which sent several players to Allentown for playing time. Scott was the fourth player picked in the U.S. in the 1961 NBA draft by the Detroit Pistons.

In 1979, the franchise rebranded itself as the Lehigh Valley Jets, an effort to expand its fanbase throughout the greater Lehigh Valley; however, after the 1980–81 season, the Jets folded.

== Year-by-year ==
Year	League	Gp	W	L	Pct.	Reg. season	Playoffs
1958/59	EPBL	28	6	22	.214	8th	did not qualify
1959/60	EPBL	27	15	12	.556	3rd	Lost EPBL Semifinals 139–102 Vs Easton Madisons
1960/61	EPBL	28	19	9	.679	1st	Won EPBL Semi Finals 129–97 Vs Sunbury Mercuries, Lost EBPL Finals 119–104 Vs Baltimore Bullets
1961/62	EPBL	27	22	5	.815	1st	Won EPBL Semi Finals 2–0 Vs Trenton Colonials, Won EPBL Championship 2–1 Vs Williamsport Billies
1962/63	EPBL	28	20	8	.714	1st	Won EPBL Semi Finals 2–1 Vs Williamsport Billies, Won EPBL Championship 2–1 Vs Wilkes-Barre Barons
1963/64	EPBL	28	21	7	.750	1st	Lost EPBL Semifinals 2–1 Vs Trenton Colonials
1964/65	EPBL	28	16	12	.571	4th	Won EPBL Semi Finals 2–1 Vs Camden Bullets, Won EPBL Championship 2–1 Vs Scranton Miners
1965/66	EPBL	28	15	13	.536	3rd, Eastern	Lost EPBL Eastern Division Semi Finals 133–114 Vs Trenton Colonials
1966/67	EPBL	28	19	9	.679	2nd, Western	Won Western Division Semi Finals 2–1 Vs Sunbury Mercuries, Lost Western Division Finals 2–1 Vs Scranton Miners
1967/68	EPBL	32	23	9	.719	1st	Won EPBL Semi Finals 2–1 Vs Wilmington Blue Bombers, Won EPBL Championship 3–2 Vs Wilkes-Barre Barons
1968/69	EPBL	28	15	13	.536	3rd, Western	Lost EPBL Western division Semi Finals 2–0 Vs Scranton Miners
1969/70	EPBL	28	20	8	.714	1st	Won EPBL Semi Finals 2–1 Vs Hamden Bics, Won EPBL Championship Series 3–2 Vs Wilmington Blue Bombers
1970/71	EBA	28	15	13	.536	2nd, Southern	Won Southern Division Semi Finals 2–1 Vs Sunbury Mercuries, Lost Southern Division Finals 2–1 Vs Scranton Apollos
1971/72	EBA	30	21	9	.700	1st	Won EBA Semi Finals 2–0 Vs Trenton Pat Pavers, Won EBA Championship 3–2 Vs Scranton Apollos
1972/73	EBA	32	15	17	.469	4th	Lost EBA Semi Finals 2–0 Vs Hartford Capitols
1973/74	EBA	28	20	8	.714	1st, Western	Won Western Division Finals 2–1 Vs Scranton Apollos, Lost EBA Finals 3–2 Vs Hartford Capitols
1974/75	EBA	30	16	14	.533	2nd	Won EBA Semi Finals 2–0 Vs Scranton Apollos, Won EBA Championship 2–1 Vs Hazleton Bullets
1975/76	EBA	27	24	3	.889	1st	Won EBA Semi Finals 3–2 Vs Hazleton Bullets, Won EBA Championship 3–2 Vs Lancaster Red Roses
1976/77	EBA	26	21	5	.808	1st	Lost EBA Finals 3–1 Vs Scranton Apollos
1977/78	EBA	31	17	14	.548	4th, Western	did not qualify
1978/79	CBA	41	21	20	.512	2nd, Southern	Won CBA First Round 2–1 Vs Jersey Shore Bullets, Lost Semifinals 3–1 Vs Rochester Zeniths
1979/80	CBA	31	19	12	.613	1st, Southern	Lost CBA Semi Finals 2–0 Vs Maine Lumberjacks
1980/81	CBA	40	16	24	.400	4th, Eastern	Lost CBA Semi Finals 2–0 Vs Rochester Zeniths
Totals	EPBL/EBA	570	360	210	.632		
Totals	CBA	112	56	56	.500		
Franchise Totals	–	682	416	266	.610		
