= List of Continental Basketball Association champions =

Continental Basketball Association Champions

== Champions ==
Year	Winning team	Winning Coach	Result	Losing team	Losing Coach	Ref
1947	Wilkes-Barre Barons	Eddie White	2–1	Lancaster Red Roses	Woody Sponaugle	
1948	Reading Keys	Stan Schweimer	2–1	Hazleton Mountaineers	Frank Serany	
1949	Pottsville Packers	Felix Kadel	2–1	Harrisburg Senators	Russell Tuckey	
1950	Williamsport Billies	Levere Disque	2–1	Harrisburg Senators	Bill Binder	
1951	Sunbury Mercuries	Stan Novak	2–0	York Victory	Al Guokas	
1952	Pottsville Packers	Chink Crossin	2–1	Sunbury Mercuries	Stan Novak	
1953	Williamsport Billies	Hod Springman	2–1	Berwick Carbuilders	Leo Wolfe	
1954	Williamsport Billies	Hod Springman	2–1	Lancaster Red Roses	Ed Lyons	
1955	Wilkes–Barre Barons	Eddie White	2–1	Hazelton Hawks	Pancho Sacco	
1956	Wilkes–Barre Barons	Eddie White	3–1	Williamsport Billies	Hod Springman	
1957	Scranton Miners	Hank Rosenstein	2–1	Hazelton Hawks	Murray Glassberg	
1958	Wilkes–Barre Barons	Eddie White	2–1	Easton Madisons	Chick Craig	
1959	Wilkes–Barre Barons	Red Wallace	2–1	Scranton Miners	Hank Rosenstein	
1960	Easton Madisons	Chick Craig	2–1	Baltimore Bullets	Buddy Jeannette	
1961	Baltimore Bullets	Buddy Jeannette	1–0	Allentown Jets	Johnny Mascavage	
1962	Allentown Jets	Brendan McCann	2–1	Williamsport Billies	Hank Rosenstein	
1963	Allentown Jets	Brendan McCann	2–1	Wilkes–Barre Barrons	Chick Craig	
1964	Camden Bullets	Buddy Donnelly	2–0	Trenton Colonials	Stan Novak	
1965	Allentown Jets	Brendan McCann	2–1	Scranton Miners	Red Wallace	
1966	Wilmington Blue Bombers	Neil Johnston	2–1	Wilkes–Barre Barons	Hank Rosenstein	
1967	Wilmington Blue Bombers	Barney Cable	2–1	Scranton Miners	Paul Seymour	
1968	Allentown Jets	Bobby Mantz	3–2	Wilkes-Barre Barons	Stan Novak	
1969	Wilkes-Barre Barons	Stan Novak	3–2	Wilmington Blue Bombers	Tony Coma	
1970	Allentown Jets	Bob Raskin	3–2	Wilmington Blue Bombers	Ace Hoffstein	
1971	Scranton Apollos	Stan Novak	3–1	Hamden Bics	Tony Upson	
1972	Allentown Jets	Bobby Mantz	3–2	Scranton Apollos	Stan Novak	
1973	Wilkes-Barre Barons	Chick Craig	3–2	Hartford Capitols	Pete Monska	
1974	Hartford Capitols	Pete Monska	3–2	Allentown Jets	Howie Landa	
1975	Allentown Jets	Chick Craig	2–1	Hazleton Bullets	John Shannon	
1976	Allentown Jets	Chick Craig	3–2	Lancaster Red Roses	Larry Cannon	
1977	Scranton Apollos	Stan Novak	3–1	Allentown Jets	George Bruns	
1978	Wilkes-Barre Barons	Pete Monska	3–2	Lancaster Red Roses	Bob Raskin	
1979	Rochester Zeniths	Mauro Panaggio	4–0	Anchorage Northern Knights	Ron Moore	
1980	Anchorage Northern Knights	Bill Klucas	4–3	Rochester Zeniths	Art Stock	
1981	Rochester Zeniths	Mauro Panaggio	4–0	Montana Golden Nuggets	George Karl	
1982	Lancaster Lightning	Cazzie Russell	4–1	Billings Volcanos	Bill Klucas	
1983	Detroit Spirits	Gary Mazza	4–3	Montana Golden Nuggets	George Karl	
1984	Albany Patroons	Phil Jackson	3–2	Wyoming Wildcatters	Jack Schalow	
1985	Tampa Bay Thrillers	Bill Musselman	4–3	Detroit Spirits	Sam Washington	
1986	Tampa Bay Thrillers	Bill Musselman	4–1	La Crosse Catbirds	Ron Ekker	
1987	Rapid City Thrillers	Bill Musselman	4–1	Rockford Lightning	Mauro Panaggio	
1988	Albany Patroons	Bill Musselman	4–3	Wyoming Wildcatters	Cazzie Russell	
1989	Tulsa Fast Breakers	Henry Bibby	4–0	Rockford Lightning	Charley Rosen	
1990	La Crosse Catbirds	Flip Saunders	4–1	Rapid City Thrillers	Eric Musselman	
1991	Wichita Falls Texans	John Treloar	4–3	Quad City Thunder	Mauro Panaggio	
1992	La Crosse Catbirds	Flip Saunders	4–3	Rapid City Thrillers	Eric Musselman	
1993	Omaha Racers	Mike Thibault	4–2	Grand Rapids Hoops	Bruce Stewart	
1994	Quad City Thunder	Dan Panaggio	4–1	Omaha Racers	Mike Thibault	
1995	Yakima Sun Kings	Morris McHone	4–2	Pittsburgh Piranhas	Don Zierden	
1996	Sioux Falls Skyforce	Morris McHone	4–1	Fort Wayne Fury	Gerald Oliver	
1997	Oklahoma City Cavalry	Russ Bergman	4–2	Florida Beachdogs	Eric Musselman	
1998	Quad City Thunder	Dan Panaggio	4–3	Sioux Falls Skyforce	Morris McHone	
1999	Connecticut Pride	Tyler Jones	4–1	Sioux Falls Skyforce	Morris McHone	
2000	Yakima Sun Kings	Paul Woolpert	1–0	La Crosse Bobcats	Bill Klucas	
2001	League suspended operations					
2002	Dakota Wizards	David Joerger	1–0	Rockford Lightning	Stacey King	
2003	Yakima Sun Kings	Bill Bayno	1–0	Grand Rapids Hoops	Rod Baker	
2004	Dakota Wizards	David Joerger	1–0	Idaho Stampede	Larry Krystkowiak	
2005	Sioux Falls Skyforce	David Joerger	3–1	Rockford Lightning	Chris Daleo	
2006	Yakama Sun Kings	Paul Woolpert	2–1	Gary Steelheads	Jaren Jackson	
2007	Yakama Sun Kings	Paul Woolpert	3–0	Albany Patroons	Derrick Rowland	
2008	Oklahoma Cavalry	Micheal Ray Richardson	3–2	Minot Skyrockets	Chris Daleo	
2009	Lawton-Fort Sill Cavalry	Micheal Ray Richardson	2–1	Albany Patroons	Derrick Rowland	

== See also ==
- Continental Basketball Association
- Continental Basketball Association franchise history
- List of Continental Basketball Association All-Star Games
- List of Continental Basketball Association MVP's and Notable Alumni
- List of developmental and minor sports leagues
