= List of Eastern Basketball Association seasons =

The Eastern Basketball Association was a professional basketball league based in the United States. The league began in 1946 and was known as the Eastern Pennsylvania Basketball League. After two seasons of play, the league changed its name to the Eastern Professional Basketball League. By 1970, the EPBL removed the "Professional" part of its name in order to change its name to the Eastern Basketball Association. In 1978, the league changed its name again to the Continental Basketball Association after they added a team in Anchorage, Alaska into their league in its final season under the Eastern Basketball Association name.

== Eastern Pennsylvania Basketball League / Eastern Professional Basketball League (1946–1970) ==
=== 1946–47 season ===
Teams

- Allentown Rockets
- Binghamton Triplets (relocated to Pottsville, Pennsylvania during the season)
- Hazleton Mountaineers
- Lancaster Red Roses
- Pottsville Pros (relocated from Binghamton, New York during the season)
- Reading Keys
- Wilkes-Barre Barons

Regular season standings

Team	W	L	PCT	GB
Wilkes-Barre Barons	22	5	.815	—
Lancaster Red Roses	20	10	.667	3.5
Reading Keys	15	13	.536	7.5
Hazleton Mountaineers	11	17	.393	11.5
Allentown Rockets	8	18	.308	13.5
Binghamton/Pottsville Pros	7	20	.259	15

Postseason

Semifinals
1	Wilkes-Barre Barons	2
3	Reading Keys	0
2	Lancaster Red Roses	2
4	Hazleton Mountaineers	0

Finals
1	Wilkes-Barre Barons	2
2	Lancaster Red Roses	1

League map

Locations EPBL teams during the 1946–47 season

Notes

- The Binghamton Triplets re-located to Pottsville, Pennsylvania in December 1946.

=== 1947–48 season ===
Teams

- Harrisburg Senators
- Hazleton Mountaineers
- Lancaster Red Roses
- Philadelphia Lumberjacks
- Pottsville Packers
- Reading Keys
- Sunbury Mercuries
- Williamsport Billies

Regular season standings

Team	W	L	PCT	GB
Pottsville Packers	19	9	.679	—
Reading Keys	19	9	.679	—
Hazleton Mountaineers	18	10	..643	1
Lancaster Red Roses	14	14	.500	5
Sunbury Mercuries	13	15	.464	6
Harrisburg Senators	11	16	.407	7.5
Williamsport Billies	9	18	.333	9.5
Philadelphia Lumberjacks	8	20	.286	11

Postseason

Semifinals
1	Pottsville Packers	1
3	Hazleton Mountaineers	2
2	Reading Keys	2
4	Lancaster Red Roses	1

Finals
3	Hazleton Mountaineers	1
2	Reading Keys	2

League map

Locations EPBL teams during the 1947–48 season

=== 1948–49 season ===
Teams

- Harrisburg Senators
- Lancaster Red Roses
- Pottsville Packers
- Reading Keys
- Sunbury Mercuries
- Williamsport Billies
- York Victory A.C.

Regular season standings

Team	W	L	PCT	GB
Williamsport Billies	18	12	.600	—
Reading Keys	18	12	.600	—
Harrisburg Senators	18	12	.600	—
Pottsville Packers	16	14	.533	2
York Victory A.C.	15	15	.500	3
Lancaster Red Roses	11	19	.367	7
Sunbury Mercuries	9	24	.300	9

Postseason

Semifinals
1	Williamsport Billies	1
3	Pottsville Packers	2
2	Reading Keys	1
4	Harrisburg Senators	2

Finals
3	Pottsville Packers	1
4	Harrisburg Senators	2

League map

Locations EPBL teams during the 1948–49 season

=== 1949–1950 season ===
Teams

- Berwick Carbuilders
- Harrisburg Senators (later renamed the "Caps")
- Lancaster Rockets
- Pottsville Packers
- Reading Rangers
- Sunbury Mercuries
- Williamsport Billies
- York Victory A.C.

Regular season standings

Team	W	L	PCT	GB
Northern Division
Williamsport Billies	20	8	.714	—
Pottsville Packers	16	12	.571	4
Sunbury Mercuries	14	14	.500	8
Berwick Carbuilders	8	17	.320	10.5
Southern Division
Lancaster Rockets	18	10	.643	—
Harrisburg Senators	16	12	.571	2
York Victory A.C.	9	17	.346	8
Reading Rangers	7	18	.280	9.5

Postseason

First Place Playoff
Williamsport Billies	90
Lancaster Rockets	87

Semifinals
1	Williamsport Billies	2
3	Pottsville Packers	1
2	Lancaster Rockets	1
3	Harrisburg Caps	2

EPBL Championship Series
1	Williamsport Billies	2
3	Harrisburg Caps	1

League map

Locations EPBL teams during the 1949–1950 season

=== 1950–51 season ===
Teams

- Berwick Carbuilders
- Harrisburg Senators
- Lancaster Rockets
- Pottsville Packers
- Reading Rangers
- Sunbury Mercuries
- Williamsport Billies
- York Professionals

Regular season standings

Team	W	L	PCT	GB
Northern Division
Sunbury Mercuries	23	5	.822	—
Williamsport Billies	16	12	.571	7
Berwick Carbuilders	15	13	.536	8
Pottsville Packers	12	16	.426	11
Southern Division
York Professionals	15	11	.577	—
Lancaster Rockets	12	15	.445	3.5
Harrisburg Senators	9	18	.333	6.5
Reading Rangers	8	20	.285	8

Postseason

EPBL Regular Season Championship Game
1	Sunbury Mercuries	80
1	York Victory A.C.	75

Semifinals
1	Sunbury Mercuries	2
2	Williamsport Billies	1
1	York Victory A.C.	2
2	Lancaster Rockets	0

EPBL Championship Series
1	Sunbury Mercuries	2
1	York Victory A.C.	0

League map

Locations EPBL teams during the 1949–1950 season

=== 1951–52 season ===
Teams

- Ashland Greens (relocated to Hazleton, Pennsylvania after 10 days in Ashland)
- Lancaster Rockets
- Hazleton Mountaineers
- Pottsville Packers
- Reading Merchants
- Sunbury Mercuries
- Williamsport Billies
- York Cleaners (relocated to Ashland, Pennsylvania after 11 games)

Regular season standings

Team	W	L	PCT	GB
Pottsville Packers	21	9	.700	—
Sunbury Mercuries	20	10	.667	1
Williamsport Billies	17	12	.586	3.5
Lancaster Rockets	13	16	.448	7.5
Reading Merchants	11	17	.393	9
Hazleton Mountaineers	6	20	.200	15

Postseason

Semifinals
1	Pottsville Packers	2
3	Williamsport Billies	0
2	Sunbury Mercuries	2
4	Lancaster Rockets	0

EPBL Championship Series
1	Pottsville Packers	3
2	Sunbury Mercuries	0

League map

Locations EPBL teams during the 1951–52 season

=== 1952–53 season ===
Teams

- Berwick Carbuilders
- Harrisburg Capitols
- Lancaster Rockets
- Lebanon Seltzers
- Sunbury Mercuries
- Williamsport Billies

Regular season standings

Team	W	L	PCT	GB
Sunbury Mercuries	17	3	.850	—
Williamsport Billies	13	7	.650	4
Lancaster Rockets	9	10	.474	7.5
Berwick Carbuilders	8	12	.400	9
Harrisburg Capitols	7	12	.369	9.5
Lebanon Seltzers	5	15	.333	12

Postseason

Semifinals
1	Sunbury Mercuries	2
4	Berwick Carbuilders	1
2	Williamsport Billies	1
3	Lancaster Rockets	0

EPBL Championship Series
1	Sunbury Mercuries	1
2	Williamsport Billies	2

League map

Locations EPBL teams during the 1952–53 season

=== 1953–54 season ===
Teams

- Berwick Carbuilders
- Lancaster Rockets
- Lebanon Seltzers
- Hazleton Hawks
- Sunbury Mercuries
- Williamsport Billies

Regular season standings

Team	W	L	PCT	GB
Sunbury Mercuries	22	8	.733	—
Williamsport Billies	20	10	..667	2
Hazleton Hawks	15	15	.500	5
Lancaster Red Roses	15	15	.500	5
Berwick Carbuilders	14	16	.467	6
Lebanon Seltzers	4	26	.133	16

Postseason

Semifinals
1	Sunbury Mercuries	0
4	Lancaster Red Roses	2
2	Williamsport Billies	2
3	Hazleton Hawks	1

EPBL Championship Series
4	Lancaster Red Roses	1
2	Williamsport Billies	2

League map

Locations EPBL teams during the 1953–54 season

=== 1954–55 season ===
Teams

- Carbondale Celtics (folded midseason)
- Lancaster Rockets
- Hazleton Hawks
- Scranton Miners
- Sunbury Mercuries
- Wilkes-Barre Barons
- Williamsport Billies

Regular season standings

Team	W	L	PCT	GB
Williamsport Billies	19	11	.633	—
Wilkes-Barre Barons	18	12	.600	1
Scranton Miners	15	15	.500	4
Hazleton Hawks	15	15	.500	4
Sunbury Mercuries	13	17	.433	6
Lancaster Red Roses	10	20	.333	9

Notes

- William Morgan, the league commissioner since its inception, was succeeded by Harry Rudolph.

=== 1955–56 season ===
Teams

- Hazleton Hawks
- New York–Harlem Yankees
- Scranton Miners
- Sunbury Mercuries
- Trenton Capitols (folded midseason)
- Wilkes-Barre Barons
- Williamsport Billies

Regular season standings

Team	W	L	PCT	GB
Williamsport Billies	18	9	.667	—
Wilkes-Barre Barons	18	12	.600	1.5
Scranton Miners	14	13	.519	4
Sunbury Mercuries	13	13	.500	4.5
Hazleton Hawks	11	15	.423	6.5
Trenton Capitols; New York–Harlem Yankees^{§}	2	14	.125	10.5

^{§} New York–Harlem Yankees took over the Trenton Capitols schedule and record after Trenton folded during the season

=== 1956–57 season ===
Teams

- Easton-Phillipsburg Madisons
- Hazleton Hawks
- Scranton Miners
- Sunbury Mercuries
- Wilkes-Barre Barons
- Williamsport Billies

Regular season standings

Team	W	L	PCT	GB
Scranton Miners	21	9	.700	—
Hazleton Hawks	20	10	.667	1
Sunbury Mercuries	14	16	.467	7
Williamsport Billies	13	17	.433	8
Wilkes-Barre Barons	11	18	.379	9.5
Easton-Phillipsburg Madisons	10	19	.345	10.5

=== 1957–58 season ===
Teams

- Easton-Phillipsburg Madisons
- Hazleton Hawks
- Reading Keys (folded midseason)
- Scranton Miners
- Sunbury Mercuries
- Wilkes-Barre Barons
- Williamsport Billies
- Wilmington Jets

Regular season standings

Team	W	L	PCT	GB
Wilkes-Barre Barons	19	10	.655	—
Hazleton Hawks	19	11	.633	.5
Easton-Phillipsburg Madisons	18	11	.621	1
Sunbury Mercuries	18	11	.621	1
Scranton Miners	18	12	.600	1.5
Williamsport Billies	17	12	.586	2
Wilmington Jets	6	22	.214	12.5
Reading Keys	1	27	.036	17.5

Notes and events

- Two expansion franchises were admitted to the league in September 1957. They were clubs in Reading, Pennsylvania and Wilmington, Delaware which would become the Reading Keys and Wilmington Jets, respectively.
- Harry Rudolph was elected league president in September 1957. Barry Sherman was elected secretary and public relations director. Elected members of the board of governors were Clem Palevitch, Richard Smith and Jack Agnor.

=== 1958–59 season ===
Teams

- Allentown Jets
- Baltimore Bullets
- Easton-Phillipsburg Madisons
- Hazleton Hawks
- Rochester Colonels (folded after eight games)
- Scranton Miners
- Sunbury Mercuries
- Wilkes-Barre Barons
- Williamsport Billies

Regular season standings

Team	W	L	PCT	GB
Scranton Miners	21	7	.750	—
Wilkes-Barre Barons	19	9	.679	2
Easton-Phillipsburg Madisons	17	11	.607	4
Hazleton Hawks	16	12	.571	5
Sunbury Mercuries	12	16	.429	9
Baltimore Bullets	12	16	.429	9
Williamsport Billies	9	19	.321	12
Allentown Jets	6	22	.214	15

Notes and events

- League president Harry Rudolph announced that Bill Spivey of the Wilkes-Barre team was fined $10 for fighting during a game. It was Spivey's second fine of the season and Rudolph said if another incident occurred it would result in a suspension.

=== 1959–1960 season ===
Teams

- Allentown Jets
- Baltimore Bullets
- Easton-Phillipsburg Madisons
- Hazleton Hawks
- Rochester Colonels (folded after eight games)
- Scranton Miners
- Sunbury Mercuries
- Wilkes-Barre Barons
- Williamsport Billies

Regular season standings

Team	W	L	PCT	GB
Easton-Phillipsburg Madisons	21	7	.750	—
Baltimore Bullets	20	8	.714	1
Allentown Jets	15	12	.556	5.5
Scranton Miners	15	13	.536	6
Williamsport Billies	12	16	.439	9
Wilkes-Barre Barons	10	18	.357	11
Hazleton Hawks	9	18	.333	11.5
Sunbury Mercuries	9	19	.321	12

Notes and events

- During the offseason before the 1959–1960 season, the league announced their collegiate draft was postponed so the league could vote on an expansion franchise from Baltimore, Maryland (which became the Baltimore Bullets).
- In January 1960, the league announced it had scrapped a rule permitting National Basketball Association (NBA) teams only one option per season on players. This rule would allow NBA team to call-up and send down players as much as they wished.

=== 1960–61 season ===
Teams

- Allentown Jets
- Baltimore Bullets
- Easton-Phillipsburg Madisons
- Hazleton Hawks
- Scranton Miners
- Sunbury Mercuries
- Wilkes-Barre Barons
- Williamsport Billies

Regular season standings

Team	W	L	PCT	GB
Baltimore Bullets	19	9	.679	—
Allentown Jets	19	9	.679	—
Scranton Miners	15	13	.536	4
Sunbury Mercuries	13	15	.464	6
Wilkes-Barre Barons	13	15	.464	6
Easton-Phillipsburg Madisons	11	16	.407	7.5
Williamsport Billies	11	16	.407	7.5
Hazleton Hawks	10	18	.357	9

Notes and events

- The league held its annual preseason meeting on June 13, 1960 where league president Harry Rudolph was re-elected to a two-year term. He was also elected treasurer of the league. Ray Saul was re-elected as public relations director and secretary.
- EPBL president Harry Rudolph announced plans to file a $1,000,000 defamation of character lawsuit against National Football League (NFL) commissioner Pete Rozelle for saying, "several players in the Eastern Basketball [League] were accused of gambling on games involving teams for which they formerly played." The comment was about Rozelle's decision to bar NFL player Gene Lipscomb from joining the EPBL Baltimore Bullets.

=== 1961–62 season ===
Teams

- Allentown Jets
- Camden Bullets (relocated from Baltimore, Maryland preseason)
- Easton-Phillipsburg Madisons (relocated to Trenton, New Jersey midseason)
- Hazleton Hawks
- Scranton Miners
- Sunbury Mercuries
- Trenton Colonials (relocated from Easton-Phillipsburg midseason)
- Wilkes-Barre Barons
- Williamsport Billies

Regular season standings

Team	W	L	PCT	GB
Allentown Jets	22	5	.815	—
Williamsport Billies	18	8	.692	3.5
Sunbury Mercuries	16	11	.593	6
Trenton Colonials	13	13	.500	8.5
Wilkes-Barre Barons	13	15	.464	9.5
Camden Bullets	10	15	.400	11
Scranton Miners	8	16	.333	12.5
Hazleton Hawks	4	21	.160	17

Notes and events

- At the league's annual meeting during the offseason before the 1961–62 season a proposal to relocate the Baltimore franchise to New England was to be proposed. The potential move would have been to either Bridgeport or Milton, Connecticut as facilitated by the prospective owner, Herb Kables. The proposal was ultimately rejected.
- The league postponed its collegiate draft due to the 1961 NCAA University Division men's basketball gambling scandal.
- Rules were adopted before the 1961–62 season to mirror the rules of the National Basketball Association (NBA).
- The Allentown Jets announced they had signed Andrew "Fuzzy" Levane to a one-year contract as coach in September 1961.
- In October 1961, the EPBL passed a resolution that would give a lifetime ban to any player who left an EPBL team for another league. The rule came in response to players who left the league the fledgling American Basketball League (ABL).
- In December 1961, a "State Basketball Championship" for Pennsylvania was proposed by Pittsburgh Rens owner Lenny Litman between his ABL team, the NBA Philadelphia Warriors and the EPBL Sunbury Mercuries.
- EPBL president Harry Rudolph announced that the Camden franchise had been fined $150 for failing to have the required seven players in uniform for a game on January 27, 1962 in which Camden lost to Williamsport 153–126. According to the Associated Press several Camden players were delayed by car trouble forcing the team to play with six players.
- EPBL president Harry Rudolph announced that Trenton Colonials coach Harry Landa had been fined for pushing a referee during a game on February 3, 1962. According to Rudolph, if Landa failed to pay the fine he would be suspended for the remainder of the season.

=== 1962–63 season ===
Teams

- Allentown Jets
- Camden Bullets
- Scranton Miners
- Sunbury Mercuries
- Trenton Colonials
- Wilkes-Barre Barons
- Williamsport Billies

Regular season standings

Team	W	L	PCT	GB
Allentown Jets	20	8	.714	—
Camden Bullets	20	8	.714	—
Wilkes-Barre Barons	15	13	.536	5
Williamsport Billies	12	16	.429	8
Scranton Miners	11	17	.393	9
Trenton Colonials	10	18	.357	10
Sunbury Mercuries	10	18	.357	10

Notes and events

- During the offseason before the 1962–63 season, the EPBL considered admitting two new franchises in Philadelphia and Carbondale, Pennsylvania/ The Philadelphia franchise was not approved as the team's owners could not find a suitable venue. The Carbondale franchise was admitted to the league, but that deal was eventually voided when team owners failed to meet their financial obligations according to league president Harry Rudolph.
- In November 1962, after the American Basketball League (ABL) folded, EPBL president Harry Rudolph announced that players who were banned for leaving their EPBL teams for the ABL could apply for re-admittance to the league if they wrote a letter to the league president with $25 as payment for a fine. Players affected by the ban were: Hal Lear, David Gunther, Hershel Thurner, Kelly Coleman and Spike Gibson.
- In April 1963, EPBL president Harry Rudolph announced that Camden Bullets player Tom Hoover was fined $100 and suspended for four games following a physical altercation with referee Jim Armstong.

=== 1963–64 season ===
Teams

- Allentown Jets
- Camden Bullets
- Scranton Miners
- Sunbury Mercuries
- Trenton Colonials
- Wilkes-Barre Barons
- Williamsport Billies
- Wilmington Blue Bombers

Regular season standings

Team	W	L	PCT	GB
Camden Bullets	21	7	.750	—
Allentown Jets	21	7	.750	—
Scranton Miners	19	9	.679	2
Trenton Colonials	16	12	.571	5
Wilkes-Barre Barons	10	18	.357	11
Sunbury Mercuries	9	17	.346	11
Williamsport Billies	7	19	.269	13
Wilmington Blue Bombers	7	21	.250	14

Notes and events

- During the offseason before the 1963–64, the Wilmington Blue Bombers of Wilmington, Delaware were admitted into the league. The league also announced it had abolished its territorial draft.
- The Wilmington Blue Bombers announced they had hired Alexander Severance as coach during the offseason before the 1963–64 season.
- In October 1963, the Camden Bullets announced that Charles "Buddy" Donnelly was hired as coach.

=== 1964–65 season ===
Teams

- Allentown Jets
- Camden Bullets
- Scranton Miners
- Sunbury Mercuries
- Trenton Colonials
- Wilkes-Barre Barons
- Wilmington Blue Bombers

Regular season standings

Team	W	L	PCT	GB
Camden Bullets	18	10	.643	—
Sunbury Mercuries	17	11	.607	1
Scranton Miners	17	11	.607	1
Allentown Jets	16	12	.571	2
Wilmington Blue Bombers	12	16	.429	6
Wilkes-Barre Barons	11	17	.393	7
Trenton Colonials	7	21	.250	11

Notes and events

- EPBL president Harry Rudolph was re-elected to a two-year term during the offseason before the 1964–65 season. The league also re-elected Ray Saul as secretary. David Waters was newly elected to the position of vice president. Hal Simon, Spike Shandelman and Arthur Pachter were elected to the board of governors.
- In June 1964, the EPBL held its annual collegiate draft in Allentown, Pennsylvania.
- Before the 1964–65 season, the EPBL established a three-point field goal from 25 feet away from the basket.
- Brendan McCann replaced Pete Monska as the Allentown Jets' head coach during the offseason before the 1964–65 season.

=== 1965–66 season ===
Teams

- Allentown Jets
- Camden Bullets
- Harrisburg Patriots
- Johnstown C-J's
- New Haven Elms
- Scranton Miners
- Sunbury Mercuries
- Trenton Colonials
- Wilkes-Barre Barons
- Wilmington Blue Bombers

Regular season standings

Team	W	L	PCT	GB
Eastern Division
Wilmington Blue Bombers	20	8	.714	—
Trenton Colonials	20	8	.714	—
Allentown Jets	15	13	.536	5
Camden Bullets	14	14	.500	6
New Haven Elms	8	20	.286	12
Western Division
Wilkes-Barre Barons	19	9	.679	—
Sunbury Mercuries	18	10	.643	1
Scranton Miners	13	15	.464	6
Harrisburg Patriots	10	18	.357	9
Johnstown C-J's	3	25	.107	16

=== 1966–67 season ===
Teams

- Allentown Jets
- Asbury Park Boardwalkers
- Harrisburg Patriots
- Hartford Capitols
- New Haven Elms
- Scranton Miners
- Sunbury Mercuries
- Trenton Colonials
- Wilkes-Barre Barons
- Wilmington Blue Bombers

Regular season standings

Team	W	L	PCT	GB
Eastern Division
Wilmington Blue Bombers	21	7	.750	—
Hartford Capitols	13	15	.464	8
Trenton Colonials	13	15	.464	8
New Haven Elms	7	21	.250	14
Asbury Park Boardwalkers	2	26	.071	19
Western Division
Scranton Miners	21	7	.750	—
Allentown Jets	19	9	.679	2
Sunbury Mercuries	19	9	.679	2
Wilkes-Barre Barons	14	13	.519	6.5
Harrisburg Patriots	10	17	.370	10.5

=== 1967–68 season ===
Teams

- Allentown Jets
- Asbury Park Boardwalkers
- Binghamton Flyers (relocated from Bridgeport, Connecticut midseason)
- Bridgeport Flyers (relocated to Binghamton, New York midseason)
- Hartford Capitols
- Scranton Miners
- Sunbury Mercuries
- Trenton Colonials
- Wilkes-Barre Barons
- Wilmington Blue Bombers

Regular season standings

Team	W	L	PCT	GB
Allentown Jets	23	9	.719	—
Hartford Capitols	21	11	.656	2
Wilmington Blue Bombers	21	12	.636	3
Wilkes-Barre Barons	20	12	.625	3.5
Sunbury Mercuries	18	14	.563	5
Scranton Miners	16	16	.500	7
Binghamton Flyers	10	22	.313	13
Asbury Park Boardwalkers	9	23	.281	14
Trenton Colonials	7	25	.219	16

=== 1968–69 season ===
Teams

- Allentown Jets
- Binghamton Flyers
- Hartford Capitols
- New Haven Elms
- Scranton Miners
- Springfield Hall of Famers (folded after an 0–7 start to the season)
- Sunbury Mercuries
- Trenton Colonials
- Wilkes-Barre Barons
- Wilmington Blue Bombers

Regular season standings

Team	W	L	PCT	GB
Eastern Division
Wilmington Blue Bombers	20	7	.741	—
Trenton Colonials	13	12	.520	6
Hartford Capitols	11	15	.423	8.5
New Haven Elms	10	16	.385	9.5
Springfield Hall of Famers^{§}	0	18	.000	—
Western Division
Wilkes-Barre Barons	26	2	.929	—
Scranton Miners	15	12	.556	10.5
Allentown Jets	15	13	.536	11
Sunbury Mercuries	10	16	.385	15
Binghamton Flyers	9	19	.333	16.5

^{§} Springfield Hall of Famers folded midseason

=== 1969–1970 season ===
Teams

- Allentown Jets
- Binghamton Flyers
- Hamden Bics
- Hartford Capitols
- Scranton Miners
- Sunbury Mercuries
- Wilkes-Barre Barons
- Wilmington Blue Bombers

Regular season standings

Team	W	L	PCT	GB
Allentown Jets	20	8	.714	—
Wilmington Blue Bombers	19	9	.679	1
Hamden Bics	18	10	.643	2
Hartford Capitols	15	12	.556	4.5
Wilkes-Barre Barons	13	14	.481	4.5
Sunbury Mercuries	10	18	.357	10
Scranton Miners	8	19	.296	11.5
Binghamton Flyers	7	20	.256	12.5

== Eastern Basketball Association (1970–78) ==
=== 1970–71 season ===
Teams

- Allentown Jets
- Camden Bullets
- Delaware Blue Bombers
- Hamden Bics
- Hartford Capitols
- Scranton Apollos
- Sunbury Mercuries
- Trenton Pat Pavers
- Wilkes-Barre Barons

Regular season standings

Team	W	L	PCT	GB
Eastern Division
Hamden Bics	19	9	.679	—
Hartford Capitols	15	13	.536	4
Camden Bullets	12	16	.429	7
Delaware Blue Bombers	11	17	.393	8
Western Division
Scranton Apollos	21	7	.750	—
Allentown Jets	15	13	.536	6
Sunbury Mercuries	14	14	.500	7
Wilkes-Barre Barons	13	15	,464	8
Trenton Pat Pavers	6	22	.214	15

Postseason

Division Semifinals
2	Hartford Capitols	2
3	Camden Bullets	0
2	Allentown Jets	2
3	Sunbury Mercuries	1

Division Finals
1	Hamden Bics	2
2	Hartford Capitols	1
1	Scranton Apollos	2
2	Allentown Jets	1

EBA Championship Series
1	Hamden Bics	3
1	Scranton Apollos	1

League map
Locations of EBA teams during the 1970–71 season

Notes

- William J. Montzman is named the commissioner of the league, making him the third person to serve in that capacity. He succeeded Harry Rudolph, who was commissioner since 1955.

ABA and NBA affiliations

- Hartford Capitols: Boston Celtics (NBA), Dallas Chaparrals (ABA)

=== 1971–72 season ===
Teams

- Allentown Jets
- Cherry Hill Demons (relocated from Camden, New Jersey preseason, relocated to Hazleton, Pennsylvania mid-season)
- Hamden Bics
- Hartford Capitols
- Hazleton Bits (relocated from Cherry Hill, New Jersey mid-season)
- Scranton Apollos
- Trenton Pat Pavers
- Wilkes-Barre Barons

Regular season standings

Team	W	L	PCT	GB
Allentown Jets	21	9	.700	—
Scranton Apollos	17	13	.567	4
Hartford Capitols	17	13	.567	4
Trenton Pat Pavers	13	17	.433	8
Hazleton Bits	11	19	.367	10
Wilkes-Barre Barons	11	19	.367	10

Postseason

EBA Semifinals
1	Allentown Jets	2
4	Trenton Pat Pavers	0
2	Scranton Apollos	2
3	Hartford Capitols	1

EBA Championship Series
1	Allentown Jets	3
2	Scranton Apollos	2

League map
Locations of EBA teams during the 1971–72 season

ABA and NBA affiliations

- Hartford Capitols: Philadelphia 76ers (NBA), Dallas Chaparrals (ABA)

=== 1972–73 season ===
Teams

- Allentown Jets
- Garden State Colonials
- Hamden Bics
- Hamburg Bullets (relocated from Hazleton, Pennsylvania before the season, but moved back midseason)
- Hartford Capitols
- Hazleton Bullets (relocated to Hamburg, Pennsylvania before the season, but moved back midseason)
- Scranton Apollos
- Hamilton Pat Pavers

Regular season standings

Team	W	L	PCT	GB
Hartford Capitols	25	17	.781	—
Wilkes-Barre Barons	22	10	.688	3
Scranton Apollos	20	12	.625	5
Allentown Jets	15	17	.469	10
Garden State Colonials	13	19	.406	12
Hamilton Pat Pavers	11	19	.367	13
Hamburg/Hazleton Bullets	4	26	.133	20

League map
Locations of EBA teams during the 1972–73 season

=== 1973–74 season ===
Teams

- Allentown Jets
- Cherry Hill Rookies
- East Orange Colonials
- Hamilton Pat Pavers
- Hartford Capitols
- Hazleton Bullets
- Scranton Apollos
- Wilkes-Barre Barons (folded midseason)

Regular season standings

Team	W	L	PCT	GB
Eastern Division
Hartford Capitols	19	8	.703	—
Hamilton Pat Pavers	14	13	.519	5
East Orange Colonials	8	19	.296	11
Cherry Hill Rookies	5	22	.185	14
Western Division
Allentown Jets	20	8	.714	—
Scranton Apollos	17	11	.607	3
Hazleton Bullets	15	12	.556	4.5

Notes

- The East Orange Colonials (originally the Garden State Colonials) were owned by author Larry Armour and his 14 year-old son, Andy Armour, who was the youngest team owner in EBA history. The Colonials had a working agreement with three NBA teams: the Cleveland Cavaliers, the Golden State Warriors and the Detroit Pistons.

=== 1974–75 season ===
Teams

- Allentown Jets
- Cherry Hill Rookies
- Hazleton Bullets
- Scranton Apollos

Regular season standings

Team	W	L	PCT	GB
Hazleton Bullets	18	12	.600	—
Allentown Jets	16	14	.533	3
Scranton Apollos	16	14	.533	3
Cherry Hill Pros	10	20	.333	8

=== 1975–76 season ===
Teams

- Allentown Jets
- Connecticut Gold Coast Stars (disbanded midseason)
- Hazleton Bullets
- Lancaster Red Roses
- Long Island Sounds
- Scranton Apollos
- Trenton Capitols
- Wilkes-Barre Barons

Regular season standings

Team	W	L	PCT	GB
Allentown Jets	24	3	.889	—
Scranton Apollos	21	5	.808	2.5
Lancaster Red Roses	19	5	.792	3.5
Hazleton Bullets	14	9	.609	8
Long Island Sounds	8	15	.348	14
Trenton Capitols	6	16	.261	16
Wilkes-Barre Barons	6	18	.250	6.5
Gold Coast^{§}	—	—	—	—

^{§} Gold Coast disbanded midseason

ABA and NBA affiliations

- Gold Coast Stars: Phoenix Suns (NBA), Houston Rockets (NBA), San Antonio Spurs (ABA)
- Scranton Apollos: Buffalo Braves (NBA), Phoenix Suns (NBA), Portland Trail Blazers (NBA), Chicago Bulls (NBA), Spirits of St. Louis (ABA)

=== 1976–77 season ===
Teams

- Allentown Jets
- Brooklyn Pros (relocated to Wilkes-Barre, Pennsylvania midseason)
- Hartford Downtowners
- Hazleton Bullets (relocated to New Jersey midseason)
- Jersey Shore Bullets (relocated from Hazleton, Pennsylvania midseason)
- Lancaster Red Roses
- Scranton Apollos
- Syracuse Centennials
- Wilkes-Barre Barons (relocated from Brooklyn, New York)

Regular season standings

Team	W	L	PCT	GB
Allentown Jets	21	5	.808	—
Scranton Apollos	20	6	.769	1
Lancaster Red Roses	12	10	.545	7
Brooklyn/Wilkes-Barre	8	10	.444	9
Hartford Downtowners	5	19	.208	15
Hazleton/Jersey Shore	3	18	.143	15.5
Syracuse Centennials^{§}	8	9	.471	—

^{§} Syracuse Centennials folded midseason

Timeline

- October 25, 1976: Syracuse was admitted into the EBA. Team owners were professional football players Walt Patulski, Jim Braxton, Mike Kruczek, Mike Kadish and Tony Greene.

NBA affiliations

- Allentown Jets: New York Knicks, Chicago Bulls, Houston Rockets
- Brooklyn Pros: New York Nets, New Orleans Jazz, Kansas City Kings
- Scranton Apollos: Los Angeles Lakers, Golden State Warriors, Portland Trail Blazers
- Syracuse Centennials: Buffalo Braves, Milwaukee Bucks, Atlanta Hawks, Detroit Pistons
- Hartford Downtowners: Boston Celtics, Indiana Pacers, Denver Nuggets
- Hazleton Bullets: Phoenix Suns, Seattle SuperSonics, Cleveland Cavaliers
- Lancaster Red Roses: Philadelphia 76ers, San Antonio Spurs, Washington Bullets

=== 1977–78 season ===
Teams

- Allentown Jets
- Anchorage Northern Knights
- Brooklyn Dodgers
- Jersey Shore Bullets
- Lancaster Red Roses
- Long Island Ducks
- Providence Shooting Stars
- Quincy Chiefs
- Washington Metros
- Wilkes-Barre Barons

Regular season standings

Team	W	L	PCT	GB
Eastern Division
Jersey Shore Bullets	20	11	.645	—
Long Island Ducks	15	15	.500	4.5
Quincy Chiefs	12	16	.387	8
Providence Shooting Stars	9	19	.321	9.5
Brooklyn Dodgers	8	22	.267	11.5
Western Division
Anchorage Northern Knights	24	7	.774	—
Wilkes-Barre Barons	23	8	.742	1
Lancaster Red Roses	19	12	.613	5
Allentown Jets	17	14	.548	7
Washington Metros	5	26	.167	18.5

Postseason

Quarterfinals
2	Wilkes-Barre Barons	2
3	Quincy Chiefs	0
2	Long Island Ducks	0
3	Lancaster Red Roses	2

Semifinals
1	Jersey Shore Bullets	1
2	Wilkes-Barre Barons	3
1	Anchorage N. Knights	2
3	Lancaster Red Roses	3

EBA Championship Series
2	Wilkes-Barre Barons	3
3	Lancaster Red Roses	2

League map
Locations of EBA teams during the 1977–78 season
Locations of EBA teams during the 1977–78 season

NBA affiliations

- Anchorage Northern Knights: Phoenix Suns, Seattle SuperSonics
- Jersey Shore Bullets: Atlanta Hawks, New Orleans Jazz
- Quincy Chiefs: Boston Celtics, Kansas City Kings
