= Chink Crossin =

American basketball player (1923–1981)

Personal information
- Born: July 4, 1923 Luzerne, Pennsylvania, U.S.
- Died: January 10, 1981 (aged 57) Danville, Pennsylvania, U.S.
- Listed height: 6 ft 1 in (1.85 m)
- Listed weight: 165 lb (75 kg)

Career information
- High school: Luzerne (Luzerne, Pennsylvania)
- College: Penn (1942–1944, 1946–1947)
- BAA draft: 1947: 1st round, 6th overall pick
- Drafted by: Philadelphia Warriors
- Playing career: 1947–1955
- Position: Guard
- Number: 7, 4
- Coaching career: 1951–1952

Career history

Playing
- 1947–1950: Philadelphia Warriors
- 1950–1951: Wilkes-Barre Barons
- 1951–1952: Pottsville Packers / Wilkes-Barre Aces
- 1952–1953: Williamsport Billies
- 1953–1954: Berwick Carbuilders
- 1954–1955: Hazleton Pros
- 1954–1955: Sunbury Mercuries

Coaching
- 1951–1952: Pottsville Packers / Wilkes-Barre Aces

Career highlights
- As player: 2× EPBL champion (1952, 1953); EPBL Most Valuable Player (1952); 2× All-EPBL First Team (1952, 1953); Second-team All-American – Pic (1944); As head coach: EPBL champion (1952)
- Stats at NBA.com
- Stats at Basketball Reference

Francis Patrick "Chink" Crossin Jr. (July 4, 1923 – January 10, 1981) was an American professional basketball player and coach. He earned his nickname from the sound that the chain-link nets made when his shots dropped through.

During his high school basketball career at Luzerne High School in Luzerne, Pennsylvania, Crossin averaged 24 points per game, and led all Pennsylvania high school players in scoring in 1941. He played basketball at the University of Pennsylvania in the 1942–43 and 1943–44 seasons before serving in World War II with the United States Navy for two years. Crossin returned to Penn for the 1946–47 season. After the end of his college career, Crossin was selected with the 6th pick in the inaugural 1947 BAA draft by the Philadelphia Warriors. In three seasons with the team, Crossin averaged 4.7 points and 1.5 assists per game.

Crossin played five seasons in the Eastern Professional Basketball League (EPBL) from 1950 to 1955 for the Pottsville Pros/Packers, Wilkes-Barre Aces, Williamsport Billies, Berwick Carbuilders, Hazleton Pros and Sunbury Mercuries. He was named the EPBL Most Valuable Player in 1952 and was a two-time All-EPBL First Team selection. Crossin served as head coach of the Pottsville Packers during the 1951–52 season, and won the 1952 EPBL championship. Crossin served as head coach of the team when it relocated to become the Wilkes-Barre Aces until they folded four games into the 1952–53 season. He won a second EPBL championship with the Billies in 1953.

== BAA/NBA career statistics ==
Legend
GP	Games played	APG	Assists per game
FG%	Field-goal percentage	PPG	Points per game
FT%	Free-throw percentage	**Bold**	Career high

=== Regular season ===
Year	Team	GP	FG%	FT%	APG	PPG
1947–48	Philadelphia	39	.240	.565	0.5	1.8
1948–49	Philadelphia	44	**.349**	.619	1.2	4.0
1949–50	Philadelphia	**64**	.322	**.782**	**2.3**	**7.0**
Career		147	.318	.711	1.5	4.7

=== Playoffs ===
Year	Team	GP	FG%	FT%	APG	PPG
1948	Philadelphia	**10**	.327	**.889**	1.0	4.0
1949	Philadelphia	2	**.419**	.714	1.5	**15.5**
1950	Philadelphia	2	.333	**.889**	**2.0**	13.0
Career		14	.355	.840	1.2	6.9
