= Jack Hewson =

American basketball player (1924–2012)

Personal information
- Born: September 7, 1924 Waldwick, New Jersey, U.S.
- Died: June 26, 2012 (aged 87) Knoxville, Tennessee, U.S.
- Listed height: 6 ft 6 in (1.98 m)
- Listed weight: 195 lb (88 kg)

Career information
- High school: Ramsey (Ramsey, New Jersey)
- College: Muhlenberg (1942–1943); Bucknell (1943–1944); Temple (1944–1946)
- NBA draft: 1947: – round, –
- Drafted by: Boston Celtics
- Playing career: 1946–1951
- Position: Forward / center
- Number: 17

Career history
- 1946–1947: Philadelphia Sphas
- 1947–1948: Boston Celtics
- 1948–1949: Trenton Tigers
- 1949–1950: Pottsville Packers
- 1950: Bridgeport Aer-A-Sols
- 1950–1951: Berwick Carbuilders

Career highlights
- Second-team All-American – Helms (1945); Third-team All-American – Helms (1946)

Career BAA statistics
- Points: 65 (2.7 ppg)
- Assists: 1 (0.0 apg)
- Stats at NBA.com
- Stats at Basketball Reference

John G. Hewson Sr. (September 7, 1924 – June 26, 2012) was an American professional basketball player.

== Early life and education ==
Hewson was raised in Waldwick, New Jersey and attended Ramsey High School. As part of the V-12 Navy College Training Program during World War II, Hewson attended Muhlenberg College, Bucknell College and Temple University. He graduated from the Maurice H. Kornberg School of Dentistry in 1948.

Hewson began his college career playing for Doggie Julian at Muhlenberg in 1942, while also playing football for the Mules. The next season, under the Navy's wartime V-5 training program, Hewson trained and competed for Bucknell in both sports. After his training, he was sent to Temple to become a Navy dentist and suited up for his third school in the two sports.

Hewson played for the Philadelphia Sphas of the American Basketball League in the 1946–47 season before being selected in the 1947 BAA draft by the Boston Celtics. He played for the Celtics during the 1947–48 season, appearing in 24 games and averaging 2.7 points. Hewson spent the following three years of his career playing for the Trenton Tigers and Bridgeport Aer-A-Sols of the American Basketball League, and the Pottsville Packers and Berwick Carbuilders of the Continental Basketball Association.

From 1949 to 1952, Hewson served in the United States Army Medical Corps and deployed to Europe as part of the occupation after World War II. During this time, he coached and played basketball. He became a captain.

== BAA career statistics ==
Legend
GP	Games played
FG%	Field-goal percentage
FT%	Free-throw percentage
APG	Assists per game
PPG	Points per game

=== Regular season ===
Year	Team	GP	FG%	FT%	APG	PPG
1947–48	Boston	24	.247	.700	0.0	2.7
Career		24	.247	.700	0.0	2.7
