= Bucky McConnell =

American basketball player (1928–2019)

Personal information
- Born: July 1, 1928 New Jersey, U.S.
- Died: April 1, 2019 (aged 90)
- Listed height: 5 ft 10 in (1.78 m)
- Listed weight: 170 lb (77 kg)

Career information
- College: Marshall
- Position: Point guard

Career history
- 1951–1953: Newark Iron Dukes
- 1953: Milwaukee Hawks
- 1953: Berwick Carbuilders
- 1954–1955: Williamsport Billies
- 1955–1956: Hazleton Hawks
- Stats at NBA.com
- Stats at Basketball Reference

Paul Joseph "Bucky" McConnell (July 1, 1928 – April 1, 2019) was an American professional basketball player. He played in the National Basketball Association (NBA) for the Milwaukee Hawks in 14 games during the later portion of the 1952–53 season. He averaged 4.9 points, 2.4 rebounds, and 2.9 assists per game. He also played in the Amateur Athletic Union and Eastern Professional Basketball League, the forerunner to the Continental Basketball Association.

In December 1955 he signed with the Hazleton Hawks.

== Career statistics ==
Legend
GP	Games played	GS	Games started	MPG	Minutes per game
FG%	Field goal percentage	3P%	3-point field goal percentage	FT%	Free throw percentage
RPG	Rebounds per game	APG	Assists per game	SPG	Steals per game
BPG	Blocks per game	PPG	Points per game	**Bold**	Career high

=== NBA ===
==== Regular season ====
Year	Team	GP	MPG	FG%	FT%	RPG	APG	PPG
1952–53	Milwaukee	14	21.2	.380	.483	2.4	2.9	4.9
