= Sports in Rochester, New York =

The city and metropolitan area of Rochester, New York, has several sports teams. Rochester was named the top minor league sports market in the country by Street & Smith's Sports Business Journal in July 2005, the number 10 "best golf city" in America by Golf Magazine in 2007, and the fifth-best "sports town" in the country by Scarborough Research in September 2008.

== Professional sports ==
Although Rochester is home territory to the Buffalo Bills and the Buffalo Sabres, Rochester has several professional sports teams of its own.

Rochester does not have a team in any of the top leagues in major North American team sports (American football, Baseball, Basketball, or Ice Hockey). Of the current teams, two play in affiliated minor leagues: the baseball Rochester Red Wings, affiliated with the Washington Nationals, and the hockey Rochester Americans, affiliated with the Buffalo Sabres. Only one professional team in Rochester plays at the highest level of its sport, the indoor lacrosse Rochester Knighthawks; all others are independent minor-league teams.

As recently as 1994, there were only two professional sports franchises in Rochester: the baseball Red Wings and the hockey Americans. Since then, a number of new teams have been instituted and several have folded. In 2007, among cities in North America with at least seven (at the time) professional teams, Rochester was determined to be the only one whose teams all had cumulative winning regular season records.

=== Major league professional teams in Rochester ===
Club	Sport	Began play	League	Venue	Titles	Championship years
Rochester Knighthawks	Indoor lacrosse	2019	NLL	Blue Cross Arena	0	N/A

=== Minor league professional teams in Rochester ===
Club	Sport	Began play	League	Venue	Titles	Championship years
Rochester Red Wings	Baseball	1899	IL	ESL Ballpark	20	1899, 1901, 1909, 1910, 1911, 1928, 1929, 1930, 1931, 1939, 1940, 1952, 1955, 1956, 1964, 1971, 1974, 1988, 1990, 1997
Rochester Americans	Ice Hockey	1956	AHL	Blue Cross Arena	6	1964–65, 1965–66, 1967–68, 1982–83, 1986–87, 1995–96

=== Semiprofessional teams in Rochester ===
Club	Sport	Began Play	League	Venue	Titles	Championship years
Rochester Royal Ballers	Basketball	2023	ABA	Roberts Wesleyan University	0	
Flower City Union	Soccer	2021	NPSL	Rochester Community Sports Complex Stadium	1	2023 (NISA)
Flower City 1872	Soccer	2023	UWS	Rochester Community Sports Complex Stadium	0	

The Rochester Red Wings baseball club, the AAA affiliate of the Washington Nationals, are one of the oldest existing franchises in all of professional sports. They play in the International League and have won at least one pennant or championship in each decade of the 20th century. The Rochester Americans ice hockey team are the AHL affiliate for the NHL Buffalo Sabres and are known as the "Amerks."

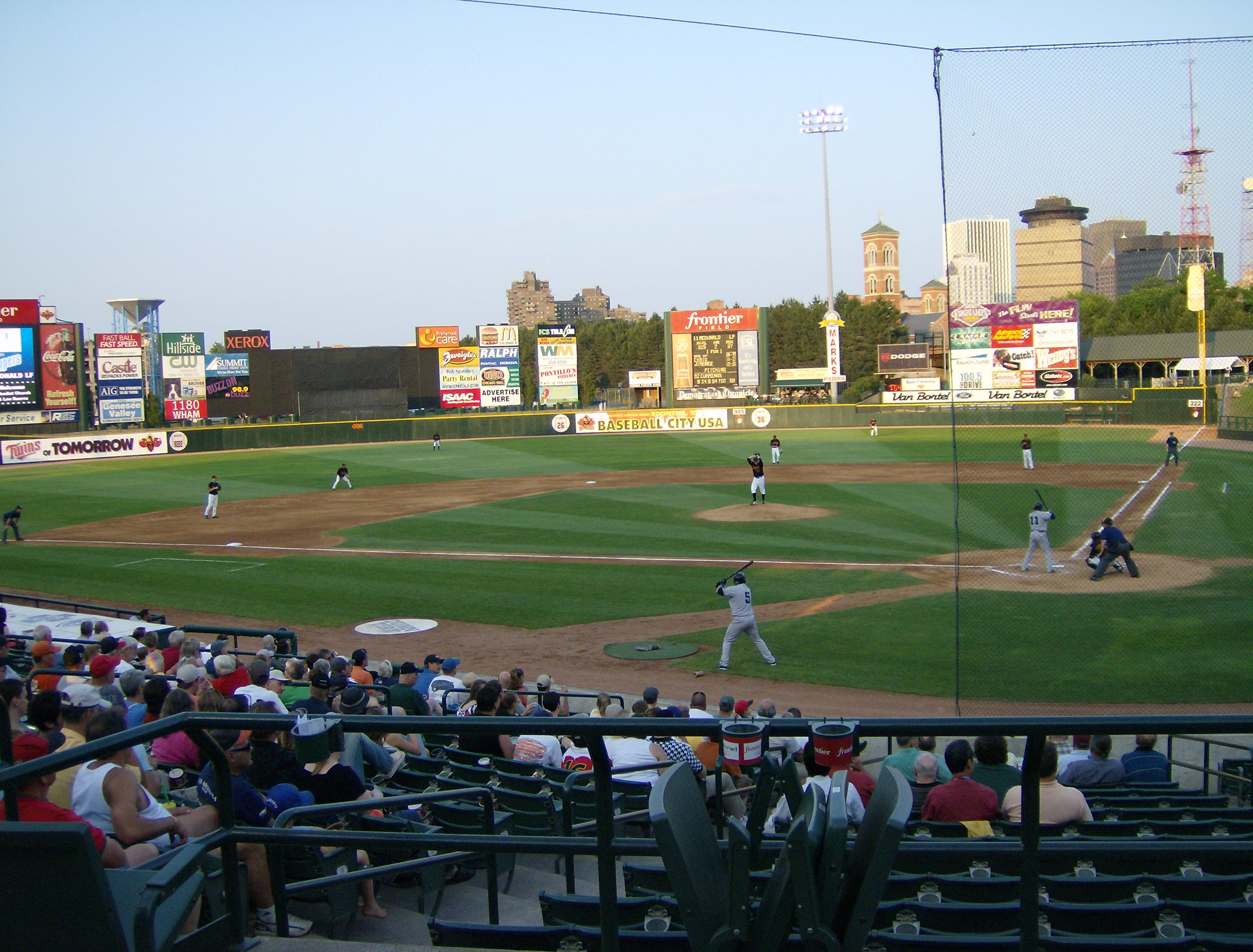
ESL Ballpark, including the Rochester skyline.

Lacrosse has seen some popularity in Rochester. The Rochester Knighthawks play box lacrosse in the National Lacrosse League during winter and spring. The current Knighthawks team replaced the former Rochester Knighthawks that played in Rochester from 1995 until 2019. In outdoor lacrosse, the Rochester Rattlers were a charter member of Major League Lacrosse, but the franchise was transferred away after winning the championship in 2008; the Rattlers were then re-established in 2011 before being relocated a final time in 2017.

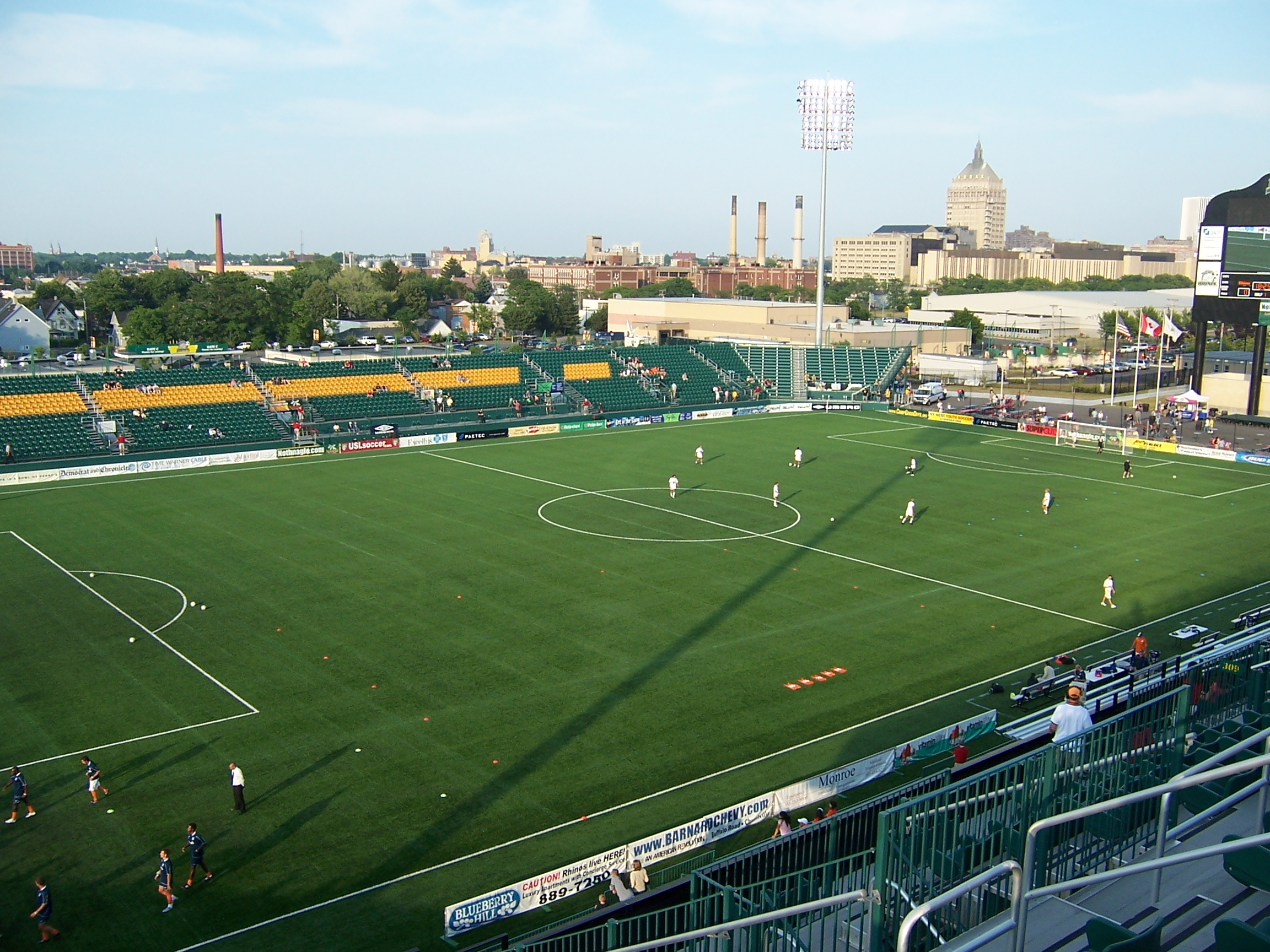
Rochester Community Sports Complex Stadium

There have been several basketball teams over time including the Rochester Razorsharks who were active from 2008 to 2017 most recently in the Premier Basketball League and the Rochester Kingz from 2023-2025.

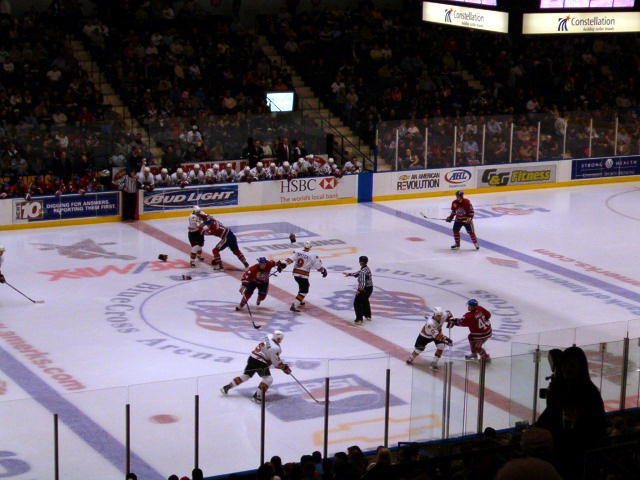
The Rochester Americans

Professional soccer, once a popular sport in Rochester, has declined over the years. The Rochester Rhinos soccer club played for many years in the A-League, which was the second-highest level American soccer league; the Rhinos won the U.S. Open Cup against Major League Soccer competition in 1999 and won league championships in 1998, 2000, 2001, and 2015. Despite the success, the popularity of the club declined into dire levels and the club suspended operations in 2018. The Rhinos team was rebranded as Rochester New York FC and in 2022 played one season prior to again ceasing operations. The Rochester Lancers started in indoor soccer in 2011 and folded by 2015. The Lancers were re-launched in 2018 and played in Major Arena Soccer League 2 until the end of the 2024 season. In 2020, the National Independent Soccer Association approved a team for Rochester and the Flower City Union took the field in 2022. For the 2024 season, they moved play to the National Premier Soccer League.

In women's sports, Rochester was formerly the home of the Western New York Flash, 2011 Women's Professional Soccer champions. In prior years, the Rochester Ravens have competed in the semi-pro W-League under a few different names. The Filarets were a notable women's basketball team that played in the 1930s, 1940s and 1950s. In 2023 Flower City 1872 was formed as an affiliate of Flower City Union and plays in the United Women's Soccer league.

The absence of a major professional sports team has not always been the case. From 1920 to 1925, Rochester was home to the Rochester Jeffersons, a charter member of the National Football League. From 1948 to 1957, the Rochester Royals played in the National Basketball Association, winning the NBA championship in 1951. In soccer, the Rochester Lancers played from 1970 to 1980 in the top-level North American Soccer League and became NASL champions in the 1970 season.

Since 1877, 29 teams in eight professional sports have represented Rochester, according to The Rochester Sports Project by local sports historian Douglas Brei. In spring 2006, Brei showed that Rochester's professional sports teams were collectively approaching 25,000 games played. That game was played on June 16, 2006, when Red Wings hosted the Indianapolis Indians at Frontier Field. He also reports that only six active franchises in the history of North American professional sports have played in the same city and same league continuously and uninterrupted since the 19th century: Chicago Cubs, Cincinnati Reds, Philadelphia Phillies, Pittsburgh Pirates, St. Louis Cardinals, and Rochester Red Wings.

== U.S Women's Soccer Team in Rochester ==
The United States women's national soccer team has played at Eunice Kennedy Shriver Stadium, Frontier Field and most recently Rochester Community Sports Complex Stadium (under a number of previous names).

=== Eunice Kennedy Shriver Stadium ===
- In 1997 the U.S. women's soccer team played a friendly vs the Rochester Ravens in front of 9,131 spectators. Team USA won 8–0.

=== ESL Ballpark ===
- In the 1998 Nike Cup team USA played vs. Russia in front of 13,125 in a 4–0 win. Also in that tournament Brazil faced off vs Mexico at ESL Ballpark where Brazil dominated winning 11–0.
- The largest crowd in ESL Ballpark history was on September 25, 2004, when the United States Women's National Soccer Team played an International Friendly vs Iceland on September 25. Team USA won 4–3 in front of 14,870 fans.

=== Rochester Community Sports Complex Stadium ===
- On September 13, 2006, Team USA played Mexico in an international friendly winning 3–1 in front of 6,784.
- On July 19, 2009, Team USA played Vs. Canada in front of 8,433 winning 1–0 on a goal scored by Rochester native Abby Wambach.
- On September 1, 2012, the US Women's team played an international friendly as part of their 2012 Olympic championship celebration Vs. Costa Rica in front of 13,208 fans winning 8–0.
- On September 18, 2014, Team USA played Vs. Mexico in front of 5,680 fans winning 4–0.

== Golf ==
Rochester has a rich history in golf dating back to the 19th century. The area's oldest club, The Country Club of Rochester was founded in 1896. Oak Hill Country Club, which is often included in America's Top 100 Courses is in the suburb of Pittsford. Oak Hill has hosted all 6 of the men's major championships: the Ryder Cup (1995), Men's U.S Open (1956, 1968, 1989) and PGA Championship (1980, 2003, 2013, 2023). The Wegman's LPGA was played at Locust Hill Country Club from 1977 to 2009. The LPGA Championship was played at Locust Hill from 2010 to 2013 and at the Monroe Golf Club in 2014. The Xerox Classic was a golf tournament on the Nationwide Tour from 2005 to 2008 played at Irondequoit Country Club. Numerous golf magazines have praised Rochester for its rich passion for the game and its high level of competition.

=== Golf courses in Rochester ===
The following is a list of golf courses located in Rochester, New York:

1. Oak Hill Country Club
2. Ravenwood Golf Club
3. Durand Eastman Golf Course
4. Genesee Valley Golf Course
5. Webster Golf Club
6. Farview Golf Course
7. Morgan's Crossing
8. Parkview Fairways Golf Course
9. Webster Golf Club
10. The Links at Greystone
11. Deerfield Golf & Country Club
12. Island Valley Golf Course
13. Deerfield Golf & Country Club
14. Island Valley Golf Course
15. Blue Heron Hills Golf
16. Eagle Vale Golf Club
17. Champion Hills Country Club
18. Rochester Golf & Country Club

== College sports ==
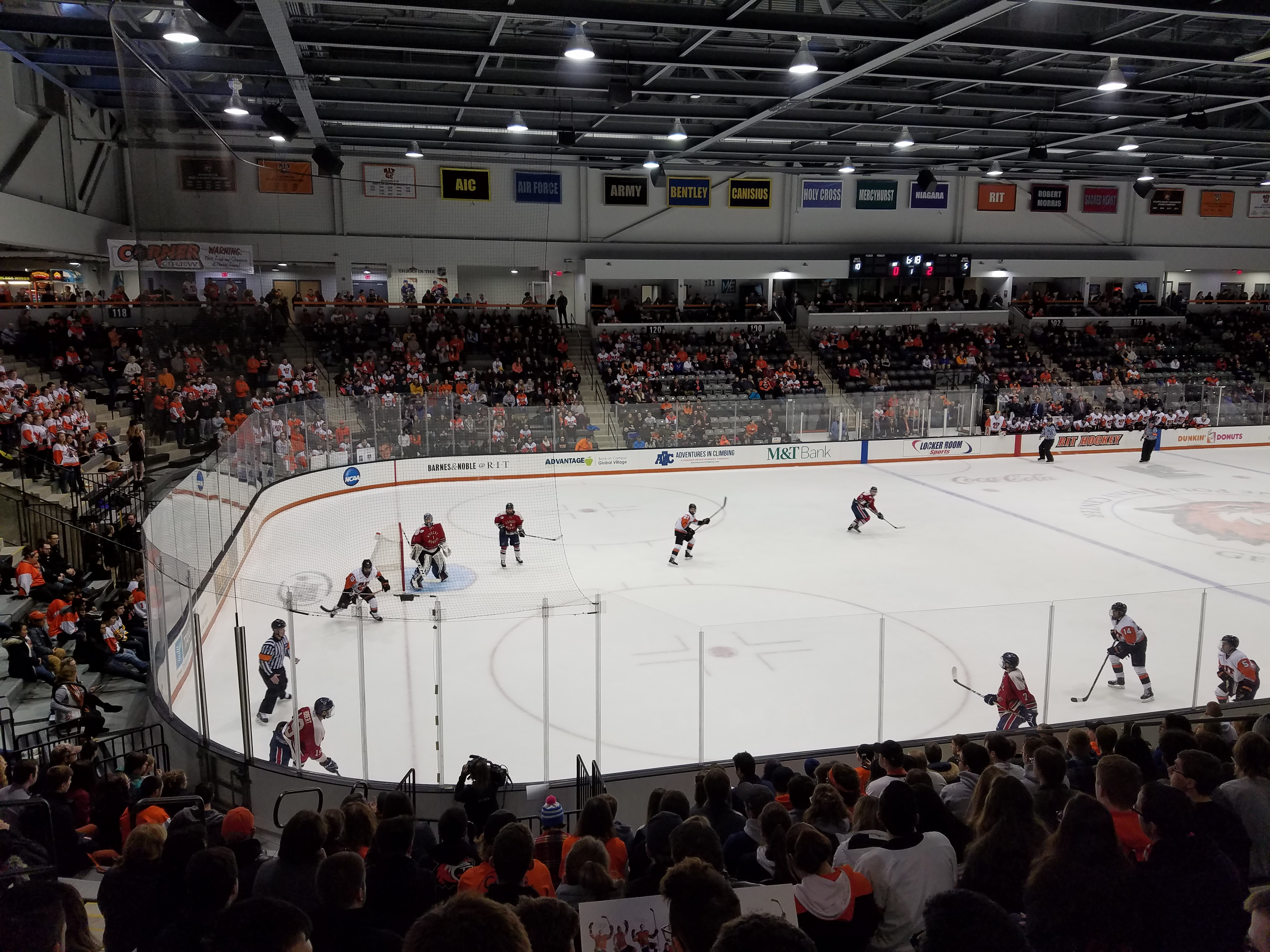
The RIT Tigers men's hockey team (team in white) during a game in 2019.

Rochester is the largest Metropolitan Statistical Area in the U.S. which does not include at least one college or university participating at the NCAA Division I level in all sports. Roberts Wesleyan College competes at the NCAA Division II level. But most other area college sports are played at the NCAA Division III level. The only exceptions are the RIT men's and women's ice hockey teams, which compete at the Division I level. The men's team made it to the NCAA Frozen Four in 2010 and the women's team won the Division III national championship in 2012, just before switching over to Division I. The Nazareth Golden Flyers men's volleyball team won the 2011 NCAA DIII national championship. Also the Nazareth Lacrosse teams won a pair of national championships in the late 1990s. University of Rochester teams have won four national championships at the NCAA Division III level, with women's soccer winning in 1986 and 1987, men's basketball winning in 1990, and men's cross-country winning in 1991. Rochester Institute of Technology men's soccer team finished national runner-up at the NCAA Division III tournament in 1988.

Among junior colleges, Monroe Community College has had some success in NJCAA Division II sports, including golf. The school won back-to-back national championships for women's lacrosse in 2010 and 2011.

=== NCAA championships hosted ===
- 2025 NCAA D3 Indoor Track & Field
- 2023 NCAA D3 Track & Field
- 2016 NCAA D3 Men's Golf
- 2016 NCAA D3 Men's Volleyball
- 2013 NCAA D3 Men's Volleyball
- 2012 NCAA D3 Women's Hockey
- 2011 NCAA D3 Women's Hockey
- 1988 NCAA D3 Men's Soccer

== Cycling ==
The Rochester Bicycling Club is a social and fitness bicycling club.

=== Races Hosted ===
- Rochester Cyclocross
- Rochester Twilight Criterium
- Tour De New York
- New York State Championships Road Cycling
- New York State Championships Cyclocross

=== Mountain Bike Parks ===
- Dryer Road Park
- Irondequoit Bay Park West
- Ontario County Park
- Tryon Park
- Harriet Hollister Spencer State Recreation Area
- Letchworth State Park
- Whiting Road Nature Preserve

== Club Sports ==
=== Rugby ===
Rochester is home to two men's rugby teams, the Rochester Aardvarks R.F.C. and the Rochester Colonials. Both have long histories, with the Aardvarks celebrating their 50th anniversary in 2016, and the Rochester Colonials celebrating 40 years in 2020. Both rugby clubs are among the few in the country to own their own pitch: Aardvark Park in Henrietta, New York, while the Colonials play their matches at Marianne Cope Parish in Henrietta, New York. The Aardvarks and the Colonials both have hosted local and statewide tournaments. The Rochester Colonials hosted the 2007 USA Rugby National Collegiate All-Star Championships, Rochester's first national tournament, as well as the 2009 NYS Rugby Upstates Tournament and the 2009 New York State High School Rugby Championships. Both teams participate in the annual Can-Am Rugby Tournament in Saranac Lake, New York in early August. Rochester also has a Women's Rugby club, the Rochester Renegades, who celebrated their 30th anniversary in 2017. The Renegades started the New York State Rugby Women's Division.

=== Other ===
Rochester Erin's Isle is a gaelic football club located in Rochester.

Rochester is also home to Rochester Rhythm the three-time champions of the American Extreme Paintball League or AXBL.

The Rochester, New York LPGA Amateur Golf Association chapter (formerly EWGA) organizes leagues, golf training, and golf events and networking for the area's amateur women golfers.

Monroe County supports two adult baseball (hardball) leagues – the Rochester chapters of the Men's Senior Baseball League (MSBL) and National Adult Baseball Association (NABA).

The Rochester Curling Club is the westernmost curling club in New York.

The Rochester Yacht Club held the 1991 Olympic Soling World Championship.
