= Metropolitan Opera House (Philadelphia) =

Theater in Philadelphia, Pennsylvania, United States

The Met
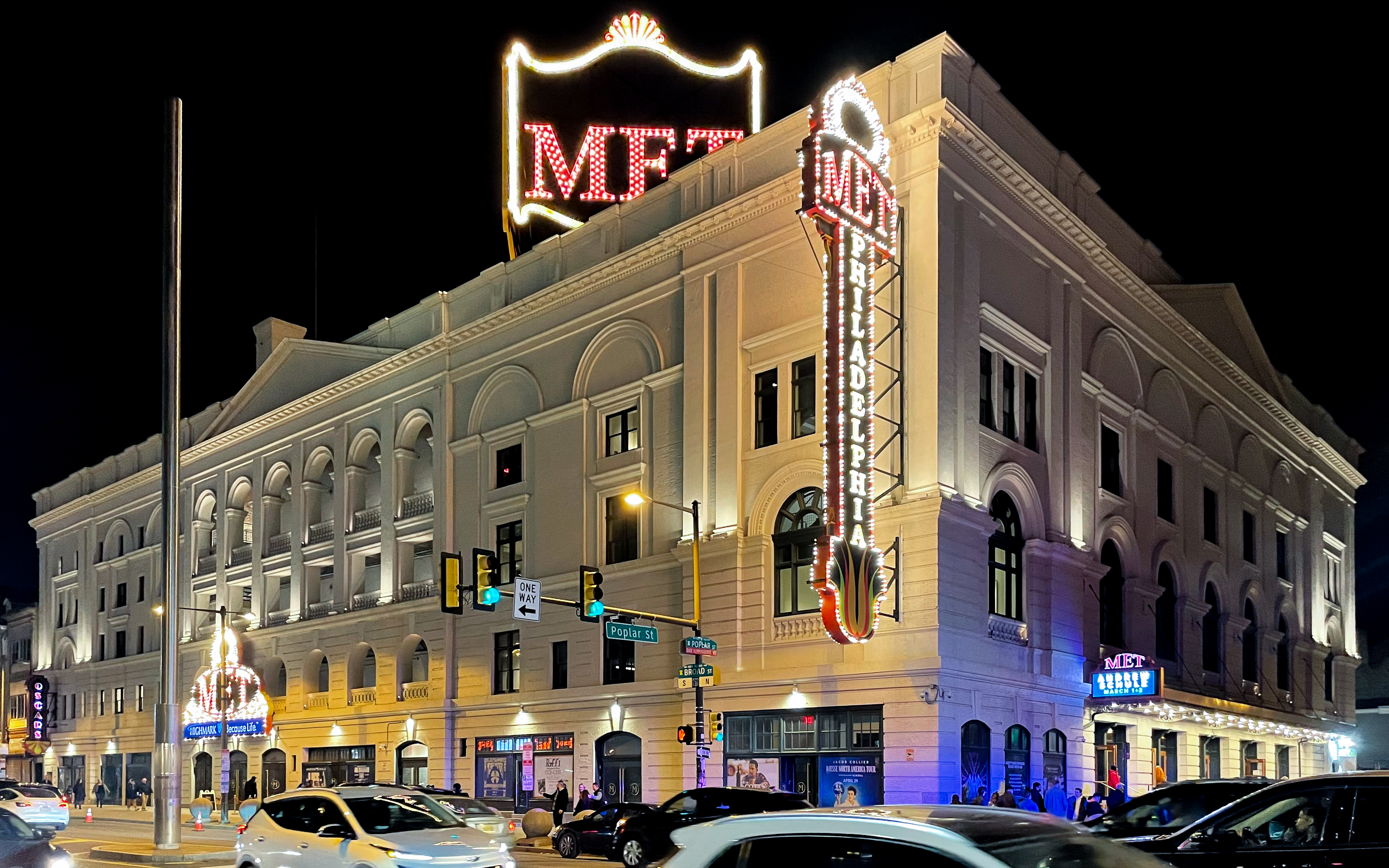
- Exterior view of the theatre (2024)
- Interactive map of The Met
- Former names: Philadelphia Opera House (1908-10); Metropolitan Opera House (1910-84); Philadelphia Evangelistic Center (1984-88)
- Address: 858 N Broad St; Philadelphia, PA 19130-2234
- Location: North Broad Street
- Coordinates: 39°58′13″N 75°9′38″W
- Owner: Eric Blumenfeld
- Operator: Live Nation Philadelphia
- Capacity: 3,500

Construction
- Opened: November 17, 1908
- Renovated: 1939; 1943; 1948; 1975; 2017-18
- Closed: 1988
- Reopened: December 3, 2018
- Cost: $2 million ($71.7 million in 2025 dollars)
- Architect: William H. McElfatrick
- Structural engineer: Phoenix Iron Company
- General contractors: Harry Weichmann; John Morrow

Tenants
- Philadelphia Lumberjacks (EPBL) (1946-1947)

Website
- Venue Website
- Building details

General information
- Renovation cost: $56 million

Renovating team
- Architect: Atkin Olshin Schade Architects
- Structural engineer: David Chou & Associates
- Services engineer: Concord Engineering Group
- Main contractor: Domus Construction
- Metropolitan Opera House
- U.S. National Register of Historic Places
- Philadelphia Register of Historic Places
- Architectural style: Classical Revival
- NRHP reference No.: 72001163

Significant dates
- Added to NRHP: February 1, 1972
- Designated PRHP: June 29, 1971

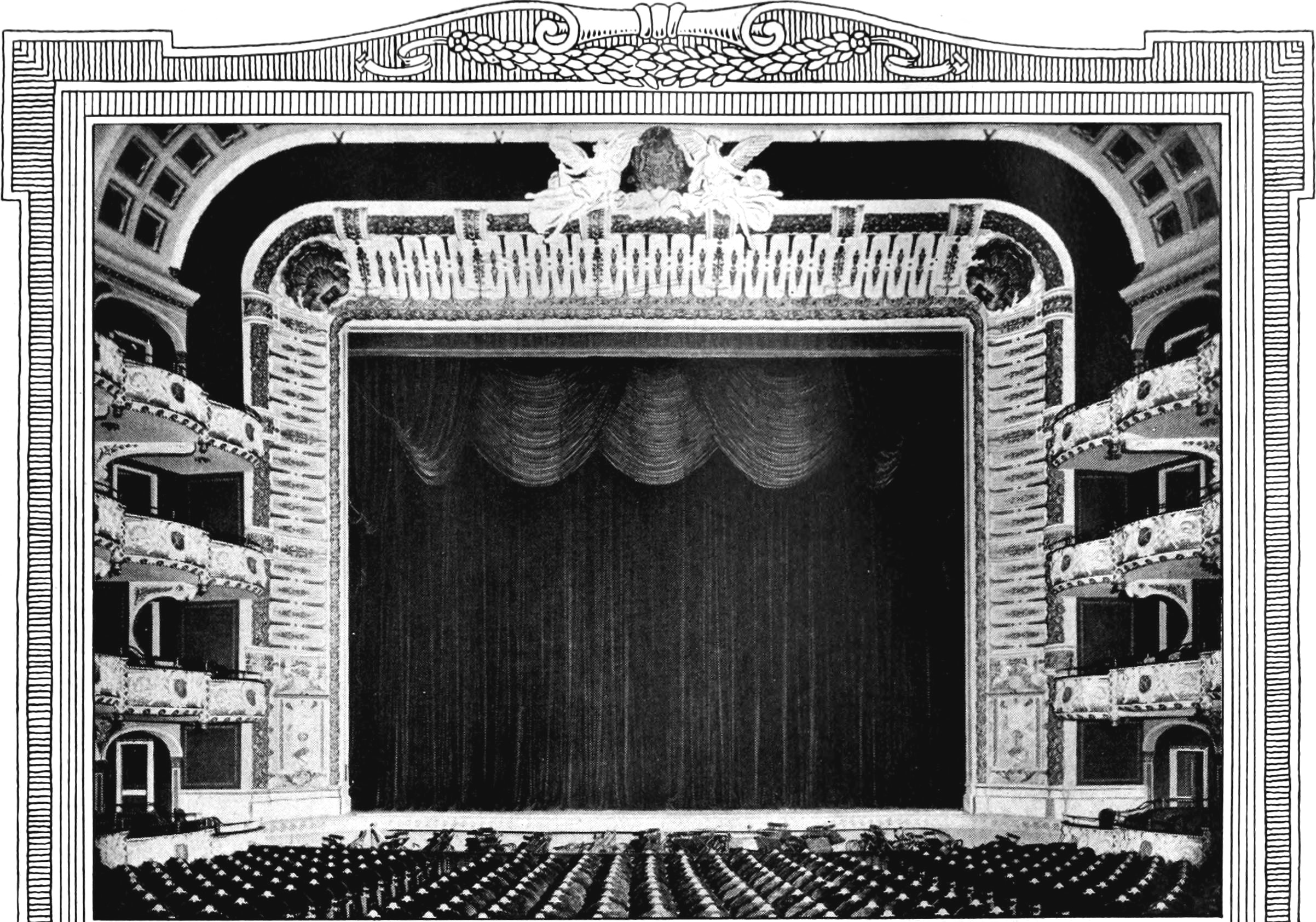
Proscenium Arch in 1917

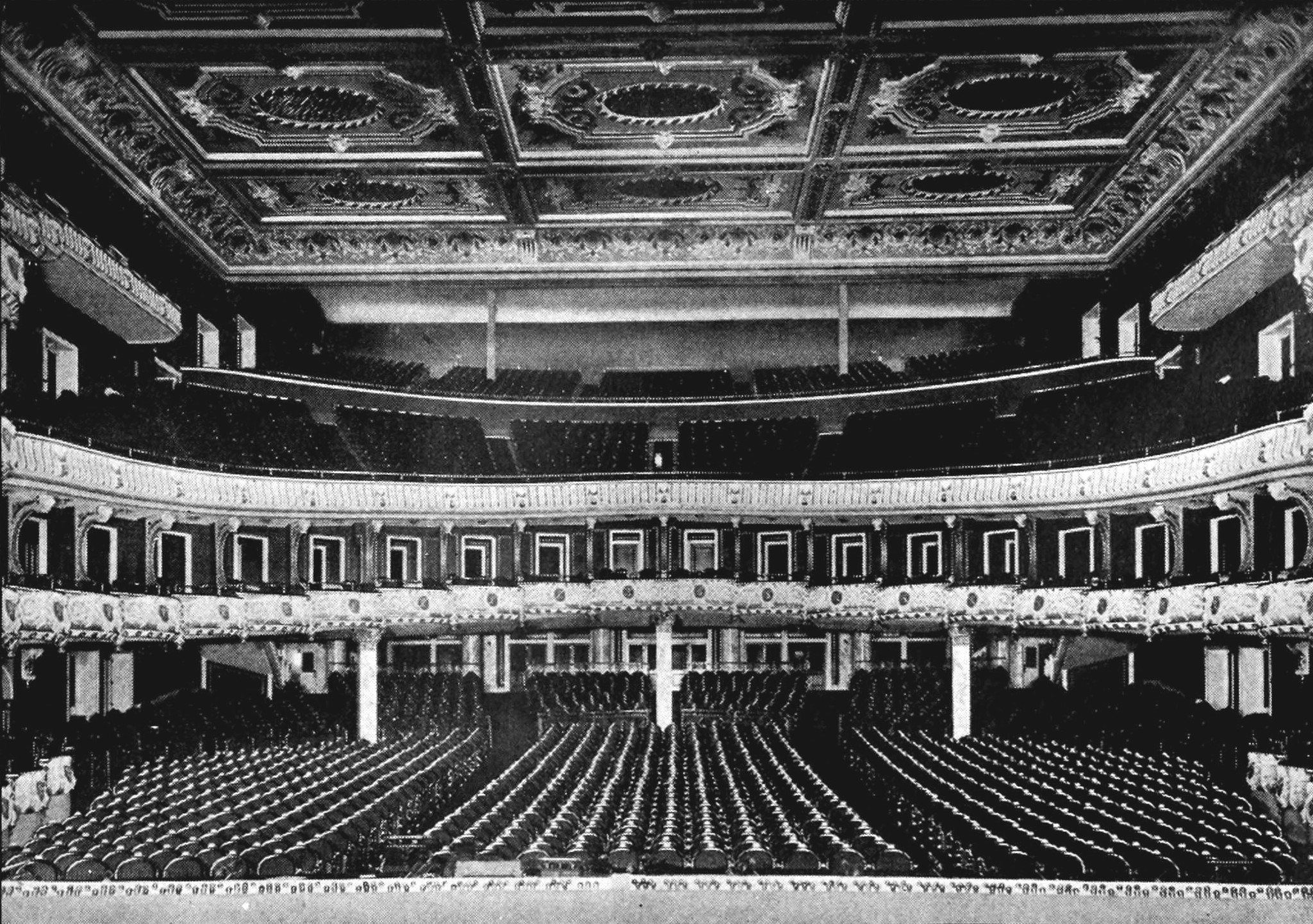
View from the stage in 1917

The Metropolitan Opera House (opened as Philadelphia Opera House; today, informally, The Met or Met Philadelphia) is a historic opera house in Philadelphia, Pennsylvania. Opened in 1908, it has been used for many purposes; since December 2018, it has been a pop concert venue managed by Live Nation Philadelphia.

Built in 1908, it was the ninth opera house built by impresario Oscar Hammerstein I and was initially the home of Hammerstein's Philadelphia Opera Company. In 1910, Hammerstein sold the building to the Metropolitan Opera of New York City, who renamed it. The Met used the building through the 1920s, after which it changed hands again and various other opera companies used it through 1934.

For eight decades, it remained in constant use, though its use changed from opera house to movie theater, to a ballroom, a sports venue, a mechanic training center, and a church. In 1988, the building was in serious disrepair and fell into disuse. In 1995, it became the "Holy Ghost Headquarters Revival Center at the Met". The church stabilized much of the building, eventually paving the way for the renovation of the facility in 2017–2018.

The opera house was added to the National Register of Historic Places in 1972.

== History ==
The Metropolitan Opera House was built by Hammerstein to be the home of his then new opera company, the Philadelphia Opera Company (POC). Hammerstein hired architect William H. McElfatrick of the firm J.B. McElfatrick & Son to design the opera house in 1907, and construction began the following year. When it opened as the Philadelphia Opera House in 1908, it was the largest theater of its kind in the world, seating more than 4,000 people.

The opera house officially opened on November 17, 1908, with a production of Georges Bizet's Carmen for the opening of the POC's first season. The cast included Maria Labia in the title role, Charles Dalmorès as Don José, Andrés de Segurola as Escamillo, Alice Zeppilli as Micaëla, and Cleofonte Campanini conducting. The POC continued to use the house for its productions through March 1910. The company's last performance at the house was of Giuseppe Verdi's Rigoletto on March 23, 1910, with Giovanni Polese in the title role, Lalla Miranda as Gilda, Orville Harrold as the Duke of Mantua, and Giuseppe Sturani conducting.

On April 26, 1910, Arthur Hammerstein, with his father's power of attorney, sold the Philadelphia Opera House to the New York Metropolitan Opera. The theater was then renamed the Metropolitan Opera House. The Met, which had annually toured to Philadelphia with performances at the Academy of Music, had been the POC's biggest competition for opera audiences. In spite of two sold-out seasons of grand opera for the POC, Hammerstein ran into debt and had to sell his highly popular opera house to his competitor. The Met's first production at the renamed theater was on December 13, 1910. The Met performed regularly at the MOH for the next decade, giving well over a hundred performances at the house. The Metropolitan Opera's last performance at the MOH was Eugene Onegin on April 20, 1920, with Giuseppe de Luca in the title role and Claudia Muzio as Tatyana. While the Met owned the MOH, it also rented the venue to other opera companies for their performances. The theater was the home of the Philadelphia-Chicago Grand Opera Company between 1911 and 1914.

The Philadelphia Operatic Society also used the house during and after the Met's tenure, through 1924. After the Met returned to performing at the Academy of Music for the 1920-1921 opera season, the MOH became the home of the Philadelphia Civic Opera Company until 1928. The Philadelphia Grand Opera Company and the Philadelphia La Scala Opera Company, two companies that primarily performed at the Academy of Music, also occasionally performed there during the 1920s and 1930s. The MOH was also host to many traveling productions by opera companies from other cities. The last opera production mounted at the MOH was a double billing of Cavalleria rusticana and Pagliacci under the baton of Aldo Franchetti, presented by the Chicago Grand Opera Company on May 5, 1934.

By 1920, while still being used as a performing venue for operas, the house began presenting silent films to the public. It remained a cinema venue after the MOH stopped presenting operas. In April 1922, J.F Rutherford gave the first radio broadcast from the Metropolitan Opera House to an estimated 50,000 people on the discourse "Millions Now Living Will never Die".

On July 14, 1939, a crowd of 6,000 supporters, including 200 active members of the Philadelphia Police Department with German Nazi sympathies, filled the Met to hear the radical anti-Jewish preacher Father Charles Coughlin commission John F. Cassidy to lead his new pro-fascist Christian Front organization.

In the late 1930s, the MOH became a ballroom and in the 1940s a sports promoter bought the venue, covered the orchestra pit with flooring so basketball, wrestling, and boxing could take place. The Eastern Pennsylvania Basketball League's Philadelphia Lumberjacks played many of the home games at the Opera House during the 1946-1947 season. The venture to bring sports to the Opera House closed after attendance waned following a decline in the quality of the surrounding neighborhood. In 1954, the building was sold and became a church.

== Decline ==
In 1954, the building was purchased by Rev. Theo Jones who had a large congregation. In the next decades, the Philadelphia Orchestra recorded in the Met for its acoustics. After 1988, church membership decreased. The building began to deteriorate, and was eventually declared imminently dangerous by city building authorities. It was saved from demolition in 1996 when it was purchased by Mark Hatcher for his Holy Ghost Headquarters Revival Center. Between 1997 and 2013, the church spent about $5 million to stabilize the building.

In October 2012, Holy Ghost Headquarters Church signed a development contract with developer Eric Blumenfeld, who eventually bought the building for $1. Blumenfeld began some interior demolition work in September 2013 but was halted because he lacked permits. In February 2015, the church sued Blumenfeld over the lack of progress on the building, alleging that the developer misled the church about his finances and "never restored the Met as promised. Rather he gutted the auditorium the church had worked so hard to renovate, effectively displacing the church and left the unfinished project in shambles."

== Redevelopment ==
In May 2017, Blumenfeld and Holy Ghost Church reached a joint ownership agreement. At the same time, Live Nation signed a lease as a concert promoter and tenant for the building and they and the owners announced a $45-million renovation to bring the theatre back as a mixed-use concert venue. It will also continue as the home of the Holy Ghost Church. With restoration work led by Atkin Olshin Schade Architects and Domus as the general contractor, the renovated Met Philadelphia reopened to the public on December 3, 2018, with a Bob Dylan concert. One year later Sirius XM radio hosted at the Met the smallest Phish performance in two decades on December 3, 2019.
