= Sherman White (basketball) =

American former basketball player for Long Island University

Personal information
- Born: December 16, 1928 Philadelphia, Pennsylvania, U.S.
- Died: August 4, 2011 (aged 82) Piscataway, New Jersey, U.S.
- Listed height: 6 ft 8 in (2.03 m)
- Listed weight: 210 lb (95 kg)

Career information
- High school: Dwight Morrow (Englewood, New Jersey)
- College: LIU Brooklyn (1948–1951)
- NBA draft: 1951: undrafted
- Playing career: 1953–1963
- Position: Forward

Career history
- 1953–1959: Hazleton Pros / Hawks
- 1959–1961: Baltimore Bullets
- 1962–1963: Wilkes-Barre Barons

Career highlights
- EPBL champion (1961); EPBL Most Valuable Player (1955); 5× All-EPBL First Team (1954–1958); Sporting News Player of the Year (1951); Consensus second-team All-American (1950); Haggerty Award (1950)

Sherman White (December 16, 1928 – August 4, 2011) was an American basketball player at Long Island University (LIU) who is best remembered for being indicted in a point shaving scandal that resulted in him being stripped of numerous honors and awards, having to serve an 8-month jail sentence, and being prohibited from ever playing in the National Basketball Association (NBA). As a college senior in 1950–51, White was the nation's leading scorer at 27.7 points per game and was only 77 total points shy of becoming the National Collegiate Athletic Association's (NCAA) all-time single season leading scorer when he was arrested. He was kicked off the team and never played another game.

== Early life ==
White was born in Philadelphia, Pennsylvania, and moved with his family to Englewood, New Jersey, at the age of two and grew up there. His father was a certified refrigeration engineer who supported the family while also taking night classes. At Dwight Morrow High School in Englewood, the 6 ft 5 in (1.96 m) sophomore immediately became the star basketball player under coach Tom Morgan. He felt close to Morgan, would follow his directions well and always heeded his advice. As a senior in 1946–47, White guided Morrow High to an undefeated season (28–0) and a Northeastern High School championship, scored a then-New Jersey prep record 49 points in a single game, and was a unanimous first team all-state selection.

White was a rather poor student; he graduated 230th in a class of 263 students. However, he had an innate ability to recall the names and statistics of the leading college basketball players in the country. Although he attracted interest from some colleges, a number of them, such as Duquesne University, rescinded their scholarship offers out of concern about his lackluster grades.

== College career ==
White sought advice from Morgan while deciding on which college to attend. Morgan was an alumnus of Villanova University, and pushed White to enroll there because he felt that the Wildcats were a good fit. Not wanting to displease his coach, a man White both respected and trusted, he agreed.

=== Villanova ===
White arrived at Villanova in the fall of 1947. It did not take long for him to rethink his decision to attend. Villanova was a Catholic school, and he did not feel comfortable as the only African American enrolled at the time. Additionally, the physical education major that he had been promised was not even an option. In his six months at the school, White received two Cs, two Ds and one F before dropping out and moving back to Englewood.

=== Long Island ===
Shortly after returning home, White was contacted for a second time by Long Island University (LIU) head coach Clair Bee. Bee asked him if he was still interested in playing, and after a conversation Bee "permitted" White to play in a scrimmage with the LIU varsity team. Despite having never competed against such a group of accomplished players, White stood out as the best player among them. He was offered a scholarship, and in February 1948 he joined the LIU freshman team for the remainder of the near-to-end season.

Bee saw to it that White, his future star, was provided the comfort and special assistance he needed. He would tip the local YMCA's janitor to make sure that the courts were open all night, for example. White, who deferred socially to his older, more street-wise teammates, became friendly with a guard, coincidentally named Eddie Gard. White liked him for his personable nature and sense of style. Gard ultimately got White involved in the point shaving scandal that followed.

White's varsity career started inauspiciously, and it was not until the ninth game of his sophomore season that he earned a starting role. His playing time increased and so did his productivity. Although he deferred to teammates more than should have, White still managed to average 9.4 points per game (ppg) for the season. The following year as a junior (1949–50), White exploded onto the national scene. He averaged over 22 ppg, was named a Consensus Second Team All-American, was named the New York Metropolitan Area's top player by receiving the coveted Haggerty Award, and led the Blackbirds to a berth in the 1950 National Invitation Tournament. On February 28, 1950, White set still-standing LIU single game records of 63 points and 27 field goals made against John Marshall College.

Midway through his junior season, White began to notice that several of his teammates, especially Gard, had been having consistently "off" games. On January 17, 1950, in a 55–52 loss to NC State, White had noticed Gard was "giving me some bad passes." At the time, White did not know about, nor was participating in, the point shaving scandal. Only three players—Gard, Adolph Bigos and Dick Fuertado—were purposely trying to lose games.

By the time White's senior season rolled around in 1950–51, he knew about and was participating in the scandal. In a March 22, 1998 interview with The New York Times, White said,

"After that NC State game, Eddie Gard befriends me. We sat down and started talking. He brought in Bigos and Fuertado. He gave me the same old story: 'We control the game. We're good enough to beat these guys anyway and we can make some money. They ain't giving you no money here at L.I.U.' The same old story. We can control the game and nobody will get hurt except the gamblers. Now I'm one of the guys. Peer pressure."

Not wanting to be the odd man out and having succumbed to peer pressure, in addition to wanting to provide money for his poor family, White agreed to either mess up point spreads while winning, or lose games outright, during his senior year.

=== Point shaving scandal ===
Eddie Gard had been contacted by Salvatore Sollazzo, the man responsible for operating the point shaving scandals at several New York City schools between the late 1940s and 1951 (City College of New York, Manhattan College, New York University and Long Island University). Sollazzo was a 45-year-old jeweler and gambler who had spent five years in prison during the 1930s. Gard's family was poor and he did not want to give up a steady income of cash, which amounted to $1,000 per player per thrown game. The original LIU players involved were Gard, Bigos and Feurtado. Eventually White and LeRoy Smith joined.

Toward the end of White's junior season he had participated in two fixes. The first was an 83–65 loss to Cincinnati, and the other was the first round in the 1950 NIT. Syracuse beat LIU 80–52, although White admitted that they were beaten soundly enough that the fix did little to decide the outcome.

In the early stages of the 1950–51 season, LIU players won several games that were kept close on purpose to avoid winning by more than the point spread (thus allowing bettors who wagered on their opponent to win their bets, while still allowing the team to win the game):

- December 2 – Favored by 7½ points over Kansas State (won by one, 60–59)
- December 7 – Favored by 4 over Denver (won by two, 58–56, in double overtime)
- December 25 – Favored by 11 over Idaho (won by two, 59–57)
- January 4 – Favored by 8 over Bowling Green (won by six, 69–63)

Suspicions slowly began to arise that something awry was going on, not only with the Long Island Blackbirds men's basketball team, but also with the other prominent New York City programs. CCNY were losing games they were supposed to win, as were NYU and Manhattan. The public did not speak outwardly about their suspicions, although police were already conducting an investigation.

Sherman White, along with teammates Bigos and Smith, disregarded Sollazzo's intended fix for a game played on January 16 against Duquesne. The three combined for 64 points as the Blackbirds downed the Dukes, 84–52. Sollazzo supposedly lost a $30,000 bet because of it and threatened White for it to never happen again.

==== Getting caught ====
On February 18, several CCNY players that had just gotten off of a train at Penn Station after playing in Philadelphia that night were arrested. Police and detectives had researched and followed the previous several years' games and the CCNY players, respectively, that led to their arrests. Two days later, police arrested Sherman White at the Carlton YMCA in Brooklyn. White later said, "I knew it was a matter of time. I was in a fog. As far as I was concerned, my life was shot." Bigos and Smith were also arrested that day.

==== Aftermath ====
As soon as White was arrested, he gave back the $5,500 he had saved in an envelope that he kept in his room. He was forced to miss the last few games of the season, and at that time he was averaging 27.7 points per game and was the nation's leading scorer. He was only 77 total points from setting the new NCAA single season scoring record. When his career came to an abrupt halt, White had scored 1,435 points. On February 19, 1951—the day before his arrest—White was named the Sporting News Player of the Year. The only reason that he was still able to accept the honor was because the Sporting News had already mailed out their newest issue and it was too late to recall the magazine. Although he had been a consensus second team All-American the year prior and trending to be a consensus first-team All-American (and a strong candidate for the national player of the year) as a senior, the NCAA refused to allow any awards or recognition to be bestowed upon any of the schools, players and coaches found to be involved in the match-fixing scandal that rocked college basketball in the late 1940s into 1951. LIU shut down its entire athletic program from 1951 to 1957 as a result of the scandal.

Judge Saul Streit presided over the entire case involving all of the schools. When deciding all of the players' fates, Streit was noticeably hard on White. Although Eddie Gard was the primary catalyst for LIU's involvement in the gambling and point shaving, White was the only player from Long Island University to be handed more than a suspended sentence. While five other players indicted from LIU got off relatively easily, White was handed a 12-month sentence to serve in Rikers Island, the main jail in New York City typically used for rehabilitation of hardened criminals (he ended up serving 8 months and 24 days). Additionally, he and all of the other players involved in the scandal were banned from ever playing in the NBA. White recalled his feelings of the stiff sentence handed down by Judge Streit:

"To this day, I believe there was some kind of collaboration between my lawyer and the prosecution. Riker's [sic] Island was supposed to have been built for rehabilitation, but it was the worst place in the world for a kid to try and straighten out his life. I often wonder why I never came out of there a criminal. With all the characters and perverts I met, it certainly would have been the easy way to go."

Years later, White, along with others, wondered if racism played a role in the harsh punishment. However, White admitted that he did not possess the necessary respect or humility in the courtroom that was probably necessary for the situation.

The man who started the whole gambling scandal, Salvatore Sollazzo, served 12 years in prison and was handed a $1,128,493 lien for evasion of taxes. One positive thing to come of the scandal, a journalist for Time wrote in the March 5, 1951 issue, was the awareness of how much influence the game had over gambling and illicit money-making ventures, which got the ball rolling to clean not just college basketball, but all college sports across the country.

== Professional career ==
Hazleton Hawks, Baltimore Bullets, and Wilkes-Barre Barons (1953–1963)

After White served his sentence at Rikers Island, he played in the Eastern Professional Basketball League on the weekends. He played for the Hazleton Hawks, Baltimore Bullets and Wilkes-Barre Barons for ten seasons while simultaneously selling storm windows, automobiles and liquor. He won an EPBL championship with the Bullets in 1961. White was the EPBL Most Valuable Player in 1955 and was a five-time All-EPBL First Team selection.

== Career statistics ==
=== College ===
Sherman White played during the era before many of the basketball statistics that are kept today were recorded, such as rebounds, assists, blocks, steals and turnovers.

LIU Brooklyn statistics
Year	G	FG	FGA	PCT	FT	FTA	PCT	REB	AVG	A	TO	B	S	MIN	PTS	AVG
1947–48	Freshman stats not available															
1948–49	30							N/A	N/A	N/A	N/A	N/A	N/A		281	9.4
1949–50	25	204	465	.438			.692	N/A	N/A	N/A	N/A	N/A	N/A		551	22.0
1950–51	22							N/A	N/A	N/A	N/A	N/A	N/A		603	27.7
Totals	77							N/A	N/A	N/A	N/A	N/A	N/A		1,435	19.8

== Legacy ==
Sherman White was viewed as a can't-miss pick in the 1951 NBA draft. The New York Knicks were ready to select him as their territorial pick. They were ready to pay him approximately $12,000 to $13,000, a very large amount in 1951. However, shortly after he was sent to jail, he and all of the other players involved in the scandal were banned from the NBA for life.

Due to his NBA career having ended before it started, White was mostly remembered as one of the best players in college basketball history whom no one ever saw play professionally. In 2007, TheDraftReview named him as its first "Honorable Draftee," acclaiming him as "the best basketball player you never knew" and "perhaps the best (college) player in New York history." It can only be speculated that if White had been allowed to play in the NBA, he might have been the piece needed for the Knicks to win the 1952 and 1953 NBA Finals rather than lose them both to the Minneapolis Lakers. In 1984, Madison Square Garden named White to its all-time college basketball team.

== Personal life ==
White married twice, and with his second wife, Ellen, they raised six children. He also coached basketball at the Newark and East Orange YMCAs in New Jersey.

Home Box Office (HBO) wanted to interview him for a feature-length documentary on the college basketball scandal of 1951 called City Dump: The Story of the 1951 CCNY Basketball Scandal, but he refused. White was upset that HBO had also wrongly claimed that part of the reason for his harsher punishment compared to the other players was that he had a juvenile criminal record, which he claimed was not true.

White died on August 4, 2011, at his home in Piscataway, New Jersey, of congestive heart failure.

== See also ==
- CCNY point shaving scandal
- List of NCAA Division I men's basketball players with 60 or more points in a game
- List of people banned or suspended by the NBA
