= Filarets =

This is an article about a women's basketball team. For a 19th-century Polish student movement, see Filaret Association.

The Filarets was a women's basketball team in Rochester, New York that played in the 1930s, 1940s and 1950s. They were a regional and national powerhouse, winning a record 211 consecutive games between 1940 and 1944.

== History ==
In the 1930s, St. Stanislaus Church in Rochester, New York started a girls' basketball team as part of its teens recreation program. The team was called the Filarets and was coached by Roy Van Graflan, an American League baseball umpire. They played by men's rules against mostly women's and some men's teams. In 1932–33, they won 25 of 26 games. By 1940, they had a record of 338 wins and 12 losses. On February 25, 1940, they scored 100 points in a 100–16 win against Utica's Sacred Heart. In 11 years, their record was 523 wins and 12 losses.

The team often packed Falcon Hall, and sometimes played a lead-in game for the Rochester Seagrams (predecessor to the NBL and NBA and the Rochester Royals). They once played against the Harlem Globetrotters (a rare loss for them). The team folded in 1957, with an unofficial 554 wins.

== Notable players ==
- Virginia Adams
- Sophie Bukowski
- Helen Finn
- Irene Grzywinski Harris
- Dot Gulewicz
- Rose Grucza
- Olga Hanchar - Captain
- Betty Howland
- Mary McGrail
- Bernice Riker
- Jean Upchurch
- Mickey Verhoeven
- Stella Walsh
- Verna Wilson
