= Douglas Brei =

American sports executive

Douglas Brei (born December 29, 1964) is a former minor league sports executive who has recently garnered national attention as a sports historian in his hometown of Rochester, New York, United States.

== Historical contributions ==
Throughout the years, Brei's research has prompted corrections and modifications to The Baseball Encyclopedia, the International League Record Book, the Rochester Red Wings media guide, and the Continental Basketball Association Record Book. He has contributed to the Pro Football Encyclopedia, the PGA Tour Media Guide, the Archives of the Giamatti Research Center at the National Baseball Hall of Fame, the Association for Professional Basketball Research, the American Soccer History Archives, the Canadian Football League Record Book, the Naismith Memorial Basketball Hall of Fame, the Rochester Public Library, and the Rochester Museum and Science Center among others.

"He digs deep for sports nuggets and enjoys sharing them with the media and public," writes Bob Matthews, sports columnist for the Rochester Democrat and Chronicle. "It is a labor of love and he does it very well."

He recently contributed to Green Cathedrals: The Ultimate Celebration of all Major League and Negro League Ballparks by Philip J. Lowry (Walker & Co., 2006)

== Recent historical research and discoveries ==
New York Black Yankees: In 2005, while working on a project documenting the histories of professional sports franchises in Rochester, NY, Brei discovered that the New York Black Yankees of the Negro National League had moved to Rochester for their final season (1948), a fact that had been erroneously omitted from every reference material for the ensuing 57 years. Brei's discovery and supporting evidence prompted the editors of The Baseball Encyclopedia to modify its 2006 edition to finally give Rochester its due as the last home to the fabled franchise. (See article link below: "Gem of Local Baseball History Found")

Rochester's 25,000th game: Brei made the headlines again in June, 2006 when he released his study on Rochester's pro sports franchises, revealing the fact that collectively Rochester's professional sports teams (dating back to 1877) were approaching the 25,000-game milestone. That historic game was played on June 16, 2006, when the hometown Red Wings hosted the Indianapolis Indians at Rochester's Frontier Field. (See article link below: "Rochester nears 25,000th pro sports event")

Rochester Colonels: In the summer of 2005, Brei provided documentation to convince the Continental Basketball Association to officially recognize the brief existence of the long-forgotten Rochester Colonels. The Colonels had been a member of the league (then known as the EPBL) in 1958, but folded after playing in just 8 games. Shortly after the team's collapse, league governors decided to wipe the Colonels from the standings without note, and the franchise went 48 years without being included in the permanent record. Despite their short existence, the Colonels featured two future Basketball Hall-of-Famers, Arnie Risen and Hubie Brown. Forty years later, the team had gone largely forgotten, even by the most knowledgeable basketball experts and local sports fans. Through Brei's efforts in 2005, the Colonels were reinstated into the 2005-06 CBA Record Book. Brei also was able to procure formal recognition of the Colonels by the Association for Professional Basketball Research and the archives of the Naismith Memorial Basketball Hall of Fame.

== Monroe County Proclamation ==
On May 9, 2006, Brei received a Proclamation from the Monroe County (NY) Legislature for his "professional and personal dedication to his community and for his hard work and dedication as an accomplished sports historian." He currently resides in Fairport, New York.
