= Rochester Colonels =

American basketball team

The Rochester Colonels were a short-lived franchise in the Eastern Professional Basketball League (the forerunner to the Continental Basketball Association) in the 1958–59 season. Playing its home games at Rochester War Memorial Auditorium, the franchise was supposed to play a 32-game schedule, but played just eight games — losing all of them — before folding on December 17, 1958. The team drew less than 900 fans for its home games.

The team's roster included Hubie Brown at center, Bo Erias, Hank Daubenschmidt, Charlie Hoxie and Arnie Risen as a player-coach.

The biggest problem for the team's existence was finances. Rochester was distant from the locations of other teams in the league at the time, forcing the Colonels to pay more for travel expenses, referees, and ask for more pay when they were visiting other teams. In addition to this, they weren't drawing many fans for home games.

Once the Colonels folded, the league decided to purge their games and individual statistics from the official league records. The team would remain forgotten until sports historian Douglas Brei uncovered its existence in 2005, and successfully petitioned the CBA to reinstate the Rochester Colonels into the official record books.
