= Camden Bullets =

American basketball team

Camden Bullets

Founded
1958, as Baltimore Bullets
League
EPBL 1961–1966
EBA 1970–1971
Arena
Convention Hall, Camden, New Jersey
Cherry Hill Arena, Cherry Hill, New Jersey
Team History
Baltimore Bullets
1958–1961

Camden Bullets
1961–1966
Hartford Capitols
1966–1973

Camden Bullets
1970–1971
Cherry Hill Demons
1971–1972

Championships
1964
Division titles
1965
Head coach
unknown

The first Camden Bullets were an American basketball team based in Camden, New Jersey, that was a member of the Eastern Professional Basketball League. The franchise was originally known as the Baltimore Bullets, where they had won the 1961 EPBL championship.

The franchise received a major boost when Paul Arizin, a member of the NBA's Philadelphia Warriors, chose to stay in Pennsylvania rather than move with the franchise to San Francisco. Still wanting to play basketball, Arizin suited up for the Camden Bullets, and helped the team become league champions in 1964.

After a disappointing 1965–66 season, the Bullets were sold and relocated to Hartford, Connecticut, as the Hartford Capitols.

== Year-by-year ==
Year	League	Reg. season	Playoffs
1961/62	EPBL	6th	Did not qualify
1962/63	EPBL	2nd	Semifinals
1963/64	EPBL	1st	Champions
1964/65	EPBL	1st	Semifinals
1965/66	EPBL	4th, Eastern	Did not qualify

== EBA ==
The second Camden Bullets were an American basketball team based in Camden, New Jersey, that was a member of the Eastern Basketball Association. The franchise played in the 1970–71 season and made the playoffs, with Ben Warley as their main star. The franchise moved for the 1971–72 season to Cherry Hill, New Jersey, and became the Cherry Hill Demons.

=== Year-by-year ===
Year	League	Reg. season	Playoffs
1970/71	EBA	3rd, Eastern	Eastern Division Semifinals
