= St. Stanislaus Kostka Church (Rochester, New York) =

Coordinates: 43°11′10.6″N 77°35′56.55″W

Church of St. Stanislaus Kostka
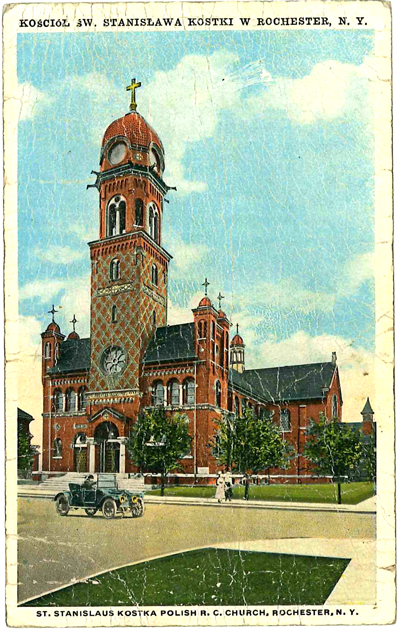
- St. Stanislaus Kostka church around 1915
- Church of St. Stanislaus Kostka
- Location: Rochester, New York
- Denomination: Roman Catholic

Administration
- Archdiocese: Diocese of Rochester

The St. Stanislaus Kostka is a Roman Catholic parish church under the authority of the Roman Catholic Diocese of Rochester, located in Rochester, Monroe County, New York. St. Stanislaus Kostka Church is the distinctive church structure located on the corner of Hudson Avenue and Norton Street in the city's northeast corner. The church is the spiritual home of Rochester's Polish American community. This Catholic church was dedicated in 1909 and replaced a smaller wooden church. The St. Stanislaus grammar school operated from 1897 until 1992.

The exterior features a Romanesque Revival architecture style including arched openings, and columns. The most striking part of the exterior is the eastern European-inspired domed steeple, which rises 120 feet above the ground. A ceiling mural of the Trinity and Communion of saints was created by Buffalo artist Jozef Mazur. A $500,000 restoration project was completed in 2014.

The church's patron, Saint Stanislaus Kostka (1550–1568), was a Polish Jesuit canonized in 1726. St. Stanislaus is one of the few churches in the US to house a relic of the late Pope John Paul II.

The Church sponsors an annual Polish Arts Festival in August.
