= Philadelphia Lumberjacks =

Philadelphia Lumberjacks

Founded
1947
League
EPBL 1947-1948
Arena
Metropolitan Opera House

Masonic Temple

Team History
Philadelphia Lumberjacks
1947-1948
Championships
None
Division titles
None
Head coach
Lou Fiorello

The Philadelphia Lumberjacks were a basketball team that played in the Eastern Professional Basketball League in the 1947-48 season. The franchise did not have a steady home court, playing several home games at Philadelphia's Metropolitan Opera House, then later at the Masonic Temple. By January 1948, the franchise had lost their home courts, and finished the season as a "traveling squad."

At a meeting in Pottsville on October 9, 1947, the Philadelphia Lumberjacks were admitted to the EPBL along with teams from Sunbury and Williamsport which increased the number of teams in the league to eight. The team was represented by John DeSipio and Lumberjacks coach Lou Fiorello.
