= Hubie Brown =

American basketball coach and sportscaster (born 1933)

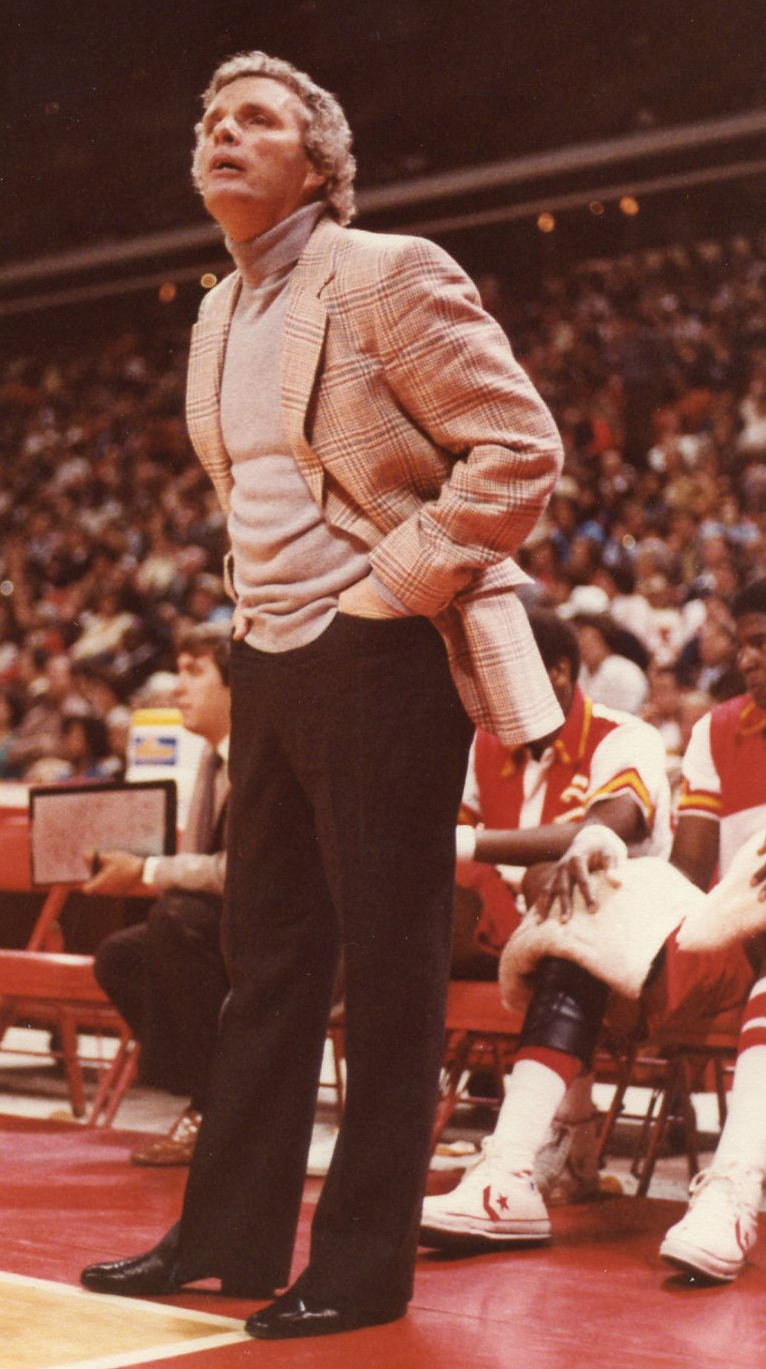
- Brown in 1981

Personal information
- Born: September 25, 1933 (age 93) Hazleton, Pennsylvania, U.S.
- Listed height: 6 ft 0 in (1.83 m)
- Listed weight: 160 lb (73 kg)

Career information
- High school: St. Mary (Elizabeth, New Jersey)
- College: Niagara (1951–1955)
- NBA draft: 1955: undrafted
- Playing career: 1958–1959
- Coaching career: 1955–1987, 2002–2004

Career history

Playing
- 1958–1959: Rochester Colonels

Career highlights
- ABA champion (1975); 2× NBA Coach of the Year (1978, 2004); Chuck Daly Lifetime Achievement Award (2017)

Career coaching record
- ABA & NBA: 528–559 (.486)
- Record at Basketball Reference
- Basketball Hall of Fame
- Collegiate Basketball Hall of Fame

Hubert Jude Brown (born September 25, 1933) is an American former professional basketball player, coach, and analyst. Brown is a two-time NBA Coach of the Year, the honors separated by 26 years. Brown was inducted into the Naismith Memorial Basketball Hall of Fame in 2005.

Following his retirement from coaching, Brown worked as a television analyst for CBS, TNT, ESPN and ABC. Brown called his final game on February 9, 2025.

== Early life ==
Brown was born on September 25, 1933, in Hazleton, Pennsylvania. His family moved to Elizabeth, New Jersey, when he was three years old and grew up there, living in a small apartment building without a telephone. Brown, an only child, has said that his father, Charlie, who worked at the shipyards, was a "demanding man."

He graduated from St. Mary of the Assumption High School in 1951. While he was in high school, St. Mary won state championships in football, basketball and baseball.

== College career ==
Brown played college basketball and baseball at Niagara University, graduating in 1955 with a degree in education. While at Niagara, Brown was a teammate (and roommate) of former Utah Jazz coach Frank Layden, as well as Larry Costello and Charlie Hoxie, who would go on to star for the Harlem Globetrotters.

== Professional career ==
=== Rochester Colonels (1958–1959) ===
After leaving Niagara, Brown joined the U.S. Army where he joined the Army's basketball team. After being honorably discharged in 1958, Brown briefly played for the Rochester Colonels of the Eastern Professional Basketball League (the forerunner to the Continental Basketball Association) before they folded after just eight games. He averaged 13.8 points per game in his brief stint as a pro and was an excellent defender as a player.

Brown also returned to Niagara to earn a master's degree in education as he looked to pursue a coaching career.

== Coaching career ==
=== St. Mary Academy (1955–1956) ===
Brown's defensive mentality would carry on into his coaching career, which began in 1955 at St. Mary Academy in Little Falls, New York where he coached both basketball and baseball.

=== Cranford High School (1960s) ===
Brown coached at Cranford High School in Cranford, New Jersey in the 1960s.

=== Fair Lawn High School (196?–1967) ===
Brown coached at Fair Lawn High School in Fair Lawn, New Jersey until 1967. He was replaced in that role before the start of the 1967 season by Bob Gottlieb.

=== William & Mary (1967–1968) ===
Brown became an assistant coach for one season at the College of William & Mary from 1967 to 1968.

=== Duke (1968–1972) ===
The following season, Brown joined Duke University as an assistant coach. Brown coached the Duke Blue Devils until 1972.

=== Milwaukee Bucks (1972–1974) ===
Brown joined the NBA as an assistant coach for the Milwaukee Bucks in 1972 under Larry Costello. Milwaukee made the NBA Finals in 1974 with future Hall of Famers Kareem Abdul-Jabbar and Oscar Robertson, but fell in seven games to the Boston Celtics, who were led by their own superstars: Dave Cowens, John Havlicek, Jo Jo White and future Bucks coach Don Nelson.

=== Kentucky Colonels (1974–1976) ===
After two seasons in the NBA, Brown was given his first professional head coaching opportunity with the Kentucky Colonels of the American Basketball Association. Brown led the Colonels to the 1975 ABA Championship. Brown continued as the Colonels' coach until the ABA-NBA merger in 1976 when the Colonels franchise folded, one of two ABA teams that did not join the NBA (the Spirits of St. Louis being the other).

=== Atlanta Hawks (1976–1981) ===
Brown then rejoined the NBA as head coach of the Atlanta Hawks, going 31–51 in his first season with the Hawks. But by the 1977–78 season, the Hawks had rebounded into a .500 team, finishing 41–41 and earning Coach of the Year honors for Brown. Two years later, in 1979–80, they won only their second division title since moving to Atlanta. However, after they tumbled to a 31-win season in 1980–81, Brown was fired with just three games remaining in the season.

=== New York Knicks (1982–1987) ===
Brown joined the New York Knicks in 1982, succeeding long-time coach Red Holzman. He stayed with the Knicks until he was fired in 1986 after starting the season 4–12. After reaching the playoffs in each of Brown's first two seasons, the Knicks plummeted to 24–58 in 1984–85 and 23–59 in 1985–86. But there were circumstances that were far beyond Brown's control that hastened the downfall. Star forward Bernard King suffered a devastating knee injury in March 1985 in a game against the Kansas City Kings, not fully recovering for two seasons, while Patrick Ewing, the top overall pick in the 1985 NBA draft, missed 32 games in an injury-plagued rookie season. Brown left the Knicks at the beginning of the 1986–87 season, succeeded by Bob Hill.

=== Memphis Grizzlies (2002–2004) ===
Sixteen years removed from his previous NBA coaching job, Brown was again tapped to be a head coach in the NBA 2002–03 season by Jerry West of the Memphis Grizzlies, who fired coach Sidney Lowe after an 0–8 start. The Grizzlies' choice of Brown was quite controversial at the time; Hubie Brown was the oldest coach in the NBA at the age of 69.

Brown finished the season with a 28–46 record with the team, at the time the team's record for wins. However, the team underwent a complete turnaround for the 2003–04 season, finishing 50–32 and making the playoffs for the first time in team history. Brown was again named the NBA's Coach of the Year.

However, by the 2004–05 season, there were again concerns about Brown's health and age. Brown was given medical clearance to start the season, but was forced to delegate much work to his assistant coaches, including his son, Brendan Brown. This led to an incident between Brendan Brown and Jason Williams when Williams snapped at Brown during the fourth quarter of a game early on in the season. Williams eventually apologized, but the Grizzlies were beginning to struggle during the season, starting 5–7.

Brown then unexpectedly resigned from the Grizzlies on Thanksgiving Day, November 25, 2004. In a statement, he cited "unexpected health-related issues ... [that were] absolutely nonexistent at the beginning of the season." Details of the specific "health-related issues" were not announced. Shortly afterward Mike Fratello was announced as the new Grizzlies coach, marking the second time in his career that he had succeeded Brown in an NBA head coaching position.

Soon after Brown's unexpected departure, it was reported by Ronald Tillery of the Memphis The Commercial Appeal that a combination of negative attitudes among James Posey, Jason Williams, and Bonzi Wells led to his leaving. Brown coached his team with a 10-man rotation, which meant that players got smaller amounts of playing time.

== Broadcasting career ==
Brown began broadcasting after being fired by the Hawks, working for USA Network's coverage of the NBA, including playoff games as well as CBS before being hired by the Knicks. During the 1985 NBA playoffs, Brown lent his services to CBS once again while still coaching the Knicks, who were not in the playoffs, teaming up with Brent Musburger. Following his dismissal from the Knicks, CBS hired Brown full-time as a broadcaster in December 1986, and served alongside Verne Lundquist as the third team during select regular season and playoff games, promoted to the second team the next season. When asked in 1988 how long he would remain involved with the game of basketball, Brown responded "I will stay involved in some capacity until the day Verne Lundquist dies." In 1988, CBS named Brown to replace Billy Cunningham as its lead analyst alongside play-by-play man Dick Stockton. Brown remained with CBS until the end of their NBA coverage following the 1990 NBA Finals, then worked on the local broadcasts for the Philadelphia 76ers and the Detroit Pistons before joining TNT in the early 1990s. Brown continued anchoring TNT's basketball coverage through the 2001–02 season, in which he was paired with announcers such as Bob Neal, Ron Thulin, Pete Van Wieren, and his old CBS partners Verne Lundquist and Dick Stockton. Along with TNT, Brown had begun work calling San Antonio Spurs games for the 2002–03 season when he was contacted by Memphis to take the job coaching the Grizzlies, necessitating him having to leave both positions with TNT and the Spurs.

Shortly after his departure from the Grizzlies, Brown signed with ABC as its top NBA analyst. Brown worked with Al Michaels and Mike Breen on some regular-season and playoff games, including the 2005 NBA Finals and 2006 NBA Finals, before he was replaced as lead analyst by Mark Jackson and Jeff Van Gundy. Brown has later called games with Mike Tirico until 2016, when Tirico moved to NBC Sports. His later broadcast partners included Mark Jones, Dave Pasch and Ryan Ruocco. Brown called his final game, between the Philadelphia 76ers and Milwaukee Bucks on ABC, on February 9, 2025, accompanied by Breen.

Brown was nominated for a Sports Emmy in 1994 and 1999.

== Halls of Fame ==
- Naismith Memorial Basketball Hall of Fame (class of 2005 as a contributor).
- College Basketball Hall of Fame (class of 2006)
- National Sports Media Association Hall of Fame (class of 2022 as a broadcaster)

== Personal life ==
Brown and his late wife of 63 years, Claire, have three daughters – Molly, Virginia, and Julie – and a son, Brendan, an NBA scout and assistant coach who then worked for the New York Knicks as a radio analyst. Claire Brown died on June 7, 2024, at the age of 87. His son Brendan died November 3, 2024, at the age of 54 due to health complications.

== Head coaching record ==
=== ABA and NBA ===
Legend
Regular season	G	Games coached	W	Games won	L	Games lost	W–L %	Win–loss %
Playoffs	PG	Playoff games	PW	Playoff wins	PL	Playoff losses	PW–L %	Playoff win–loss %

Team	Year	G	W	L	W–L%	Finish	PG	PW	PL	PW–L%	Result
Kentucky	1974–75	84	58	26	.690	1st in Eastern	15	12	3	.800	Won ABA Finals
Kentucky	1975–76	84	46	38	.548	4th in ABA	10	5	5	.500	Lost in Semifinals
Atlanta	1976–77	82	31	51	.378	6th in Central	—	—	—	—	Missed Playoffs
Atlanta	1977–78	82	41	41	.500	4th in Central	2	0	2	.000	Lost in First Round
Atlanta	1978–79	82	46	36	.561	3rd in Central	9	5	4	.556	Lost in Conf. Semifinals
Atlanta	1979–80	82	50	32	.610	1st in Central	5	1	4	.200	Lost in Conf. Semifinals
Atlanta	1980–81	79	31	48	.392	(fired)	—	—	—	—	—
New York	1982–83	82	44	38	.537	4th in Atlantic	6	2	4	.333	Lost in Conf. Semifinals
New York	1983–84	82	47	35	.573	3rd in Atlantic	12	6	6	.500	Lost in Conf. Semifinals
New York	1984–85	82	24	58	.293	5th in Atlantic	—	—	—	—	Missed Playoffs
New York	1985–86	82	23	59	.280	5th in Atlantic	—	—	—	—	Missed Playoffs
New York	1986–87	16	4	12	.250	(fired)	—	—	—	—	—
Memphis	2002–03	74	28	46	.378	6th in Midwest	—	—	—	—	Missed Playoffs
Memphis	2003–04	82	50	32	.610	4th in Midwest	4	0	4	.000	Lost in First Round
Memphis	2004–05	12	5	7	.417	(resigned)	—	—	—	—	—
Career		1087	528	559	.486		63	31	32	.492	
