= Binghamton Triplets (basketball) =

The Binghamton Triplets was a short-lived professional basketball team in the Eastern Pennyslvaina Basketball League. It began as one of six founding teams of the Eastern Professional Basketball League (EPBL) for the 1946-47 season. Binghampton joined the Allentown Rockets, Hazleton Mountaineers, Lancaster Red Roses, Reading Keys and Wilkes-Barre Barons teams in beginning league play in 1946.

The Binghamton Triplets teamed moved to Pottsville, Pennsylvania in the middle of its first season to become the Pottsville Maroons. The team changed its name to the Pottsville Packers for the 1947-48 season. The team moved again before the 1952-53 season to Wilkes-Barre, Pennsylvania to become the Wilkes-Barre Aces and folded after four games into the season.

For many years, there was also a minor league baseball team known as the Binghamton Triplets.

== Season-by-season record ==
Season	Wins	Losses	Pct.	Finish	Postseason results
Binghamton Triplets/Pottsville Pros
1946-47	7	20	.259	6th	Out of playoffs
Pottsville Packers
1947-48	19	9	.679	2nd	Semifinalists
1948-49	16	14	.533	4th	Champions
1949-50	16	12	.571	2nd	Semifinalists
1950-51	12	16	.429	4th	out of playoffs/missed playoffs/no playoffs/
1951-52	21	9	.700	1st	Champions
