= Hazleton Hawks =

Hazleton Hawks

Founded
1955
League
EPBL 1955-1962
Arena
St. Joseph's High School (1955–1962)
Team History
Hazleton Professionals
1955-1956

Hazleton Hawks
1956-1962

Championships
None
Division titles
None
Head coach
unknown

The Hazleton Hawks were a professional basketball franchise in the Eastern Professional Basketball League. The Hawks, based in Hazleton, Pennsylvania, joined the league in 1955, playing as the "Hazleton Professionals"; they were named the "Hawks" in their second season in the league.

In the team's first season, the franchise went through several different lineups and two coaching changes, but later made the playoffs by signing several players who had been part of the college point-shaving scandals, including Sherman White of Long Island University, Bob McDonald of Toledo University, and Ed Warner of CCNY. With that lineup, the team was able to reach the Eastern League finals in its first season - only to lose to the Wilkes-Barre Barons in a best-of-three series.

By the team's second year of operation, the franchise was now known as the "Hawks," and became the first basketball team in an integrated professional league to have an all-black starting lineup, which included White, Tom Hemans of Niagara University, Jesse Arnelle from Penn State, Fletcher Johnson from Duquesne University, and Floyd Layne of CCNY.

The 1957-58 season saw the Hawks finish with an 18-10 record, tying them for first place in the league with the Wilkes-Barre Barons and Easton Madisons; after a three-way playoff, the Hawks were seeded third in the Eastern League playoffs, where the team eventually lost to the Madisons.

Among the notable basketball stars who played for the Hawks were John Chaney, later to become coach of Temple University's men's basketball team; and Jack Molinas, who became a player-coach during the 1960-61 season.

The Hawks remained in the Eastern League until 1962, when after three consecutive losing seasons the franchise folded.

== Year-by-Year ==
=== Hazleton Mountaineers, EPBL ===
| Year | League | Record | Reg. season | Playoffs |
|---|---|---|---|---|
| 1954/55 | EPBL | 15-15 | 4th | Finals |
| 1955/56 | EPBL | 11-15 | 5th | did not qualify |
| 1956/57 | EPBL | 20-10 | 2nd | Finals |
| 1957/58 | EPBL | 18-10 | 1st, tie | Semifinals |
| 1958/59 | EPBL | 16-12 | 4th | Semifinals |
| 1959/60 | EPBL | 9-18 | 7th | did not qualify |
| 1960/61 | EPBL | 10-18 | 8th | did not qualify |
| 1961/62 | EPBL | 4-21 | 8th | did not qualify |
