= Baltimore Bullets (EPBL) =

Eastern Professional Basketball League franchise founded in 1958

Baltimore Bullets

Founded
1958
League
EPBL 1958–1961
Arena
Baltimore Coliseum
Team History
Baltimore Bullets
1958–1961

Camden Bullets 1961–1966
Hartford Capitols 1966–1973

Championships
1961
Division titles
None
Head coach
Buddy Donnelly

The Baltimore Bullets were an American basketball team based in Baltimore, Maryland that was a member of the Eastern Professional Basketball League. The Bullets played in the Eastern League for three seasons, and its roster of players included former University of Kentucky center Bill Spivey, who helped the Bullets win the league championship in the 1960–61 season.

After the 1960/61 season, the team became the Camden Bullets.

== Year-by-year ==
| Year | League | GP | W | L | Pct. | Reg. season | Playoffs |
|---|---|---|---|---|---|---|---|
| 1958/59 | EPBL | | | | | 6th | Did not qualify (folded in mid-season, last three games forfeited) |
| 1959/60 | EPBL | | | | | 2nd | Finals |
| 1960/61 | EPBL | | | | | 1st | Champions |
