= Berwick Carbuilders =

Basketball Team

Berwick Carbuilders

Founded
1949
League
EPBL 1949-1954
Arena
Stenko Arena
Team History
Berwick Carbuilders
1949-1951

1952-1954

Championships
None
Division titles
None
Head coach
unknown

The Berwick Carbuilders were an American basketball team based in Berwick, Pennsylvania that was a member of the Eastern Professional Basketball League.

The Carbuilders were originally formed by Paul Stenn, a tackle from the National Football League's Chicago Bears. The team was stockpiled with graduates from Villanova University, and played their home games at Stenko Arena (Stenn's last name was originally Stenko).

The Carbuilders' best season was in the 1952-1953 season, when they upset the Sunbury Mercuries in a best-of-three series, including winning the final game after three overtimes, to reach the 1953 President's Cup Finals.

== Year-by-year ==
Year	League	Reg. season	Playoffs
1949/50	EPBL	4th, Northern	Did not qualify
1950/51	EPBL	3rd, Northern	Did not qualify
1951/52	On hiatus		
1952/53	EPBL	4th	Finals
1953/54	EPBL	5th	Did not qualify
