= 1985–86 Duke Blue Devils men's basketball team =

American college basketball season

1985–86 Duke Blue Devils men's basketball

NCAA tournament, Runner-up NCAA Division I regular season champions ACC tournament champions ACC regular season champions NIT Season Tip-Off champions

National Championship Game, L 69-72 vs. Louisville
- Conference: Atlantic Coast Conference

Ranking
- Coaches: No. 1
- AP: No. 1
- Record: 37–3 (12–2 ACC)
- Head coach: Mike Krzyzewski (6th season)
- Assistant coaches: Bob Bender; Tom Rogers; Chuck Swenson
- Home arena: Cameron Indoor Stadium

1985–86 ACC men's basketball standings
	Conf.				Overall
Team	W		L	PCT	W		L	PCT
No. 1 Duke†	12	–	2	.857	37	–	3	.925
No. 6 Georgia Tech	11	–	3	.786	27	–	7	.794
No. 8 North Carolina	10	–	4	.714	28	–	6	.824
NC State	7	–	7	.500	21	–	13	.618
Virginia	7	–	7	.500	19	–	11	.633
Maryland	6	–	8	.429	19	–	14	.576
Clemson	3	–	11	.214	19	–	15	.559
Wake Forest	0	–	14	.000	8	–	21	.276
† 1986 ACC tournament winner Rankings from AP Poll

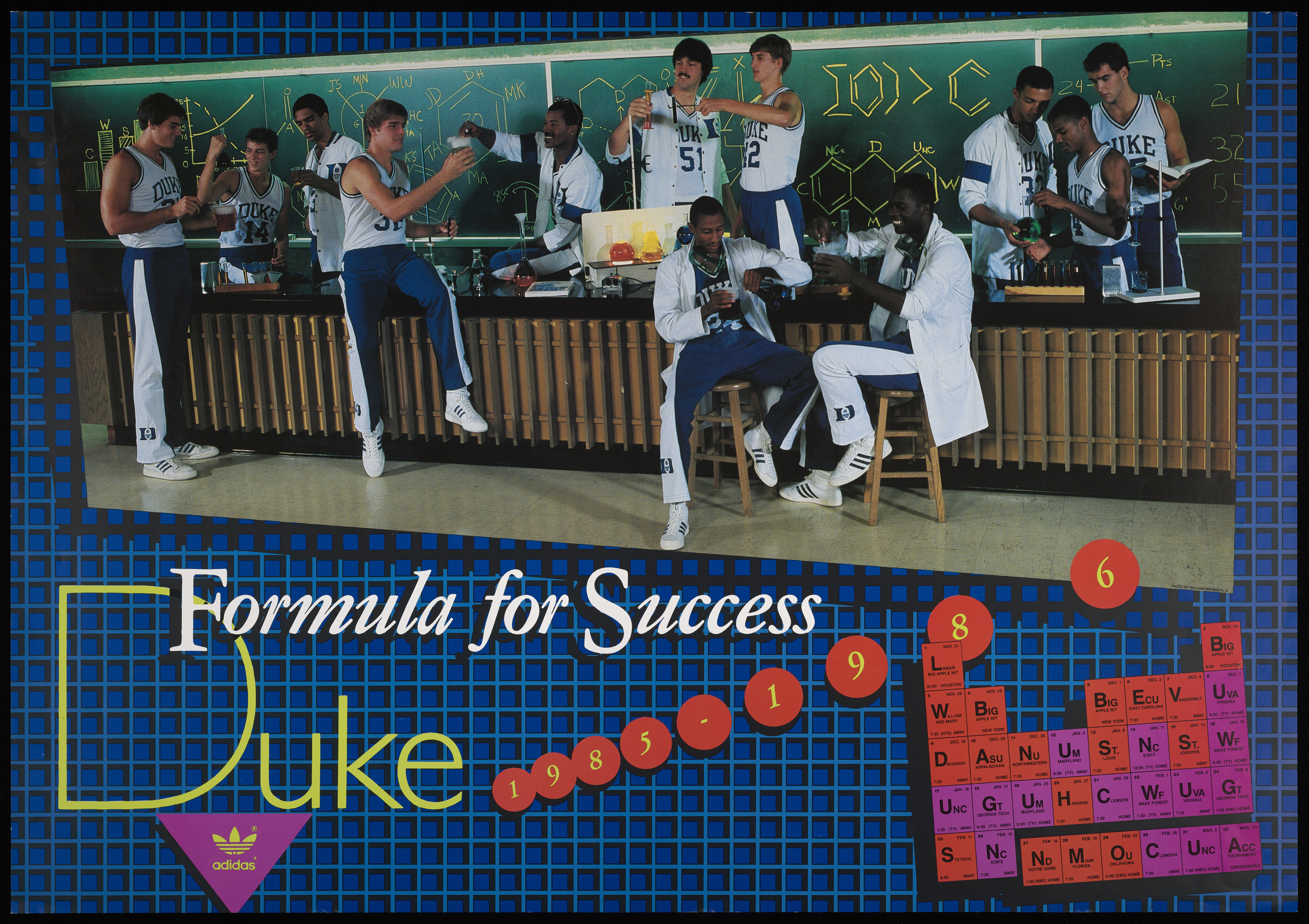
A poster released by the team at the beginning of the season

The 1985–86 Duke Blue Devils men's basketball team represented Duke University. The head coach was Mike Krzyzewski. The team played its home games in the Cameron Indoor Stadium in Durham, North Carolina, and was a member of the Atlantic Coast Conference. The Blue Devils finished with an overall record of 37–3 (12–2 ACC). Duke was invited to the 1986 NCAA Tournament as a #1 seed. Wins over Mississippi Valley State, Old Dominion, DePaul and Navy put the Blue Devils back in the Final Four for the first time since 1978. One more victory over the Kansas Jayhawks put Duke in the championship game, but the Blue Devils came up short vs the Louisville Cardinals 72–69.

== Roster ==
1985–86 Duke Blue Devils men's basketball team
Players
Coaches

Pos.	#	Name	Height	Weight	Year	Previous school	Hometown
G	4	Tommy Amaker	6 ft 0 in (1.83 m)	155 lb (70 kg)	Jr	W.T. Woodson	Falls Church, Virginia
G	12	David Henderson	6 ft 5 in (1.96 m)	195 lb (88 kg)	Sr	Warren County	Henderson, North Carolina
G	14	Quin Snyder	6 ft 3 in (1.91 m)	180 lb (82 kg)	Fr	Mercer Island	Mercer Island, Washington
C	21	Jay Bilas	6 ft 8 in (2.03 m)	225 lb (102 kg)	Sr	Rolling Hills	Rolling Hills Estates, California
G	24	Johnny Dawkins	6 ft 2 in (1.88 m)	165 lb (75 kg)	Sr	Mackin Catholic	Washington, D.C.
G	31	Kevin Strickland	6 ft 5 in (1.96 m)	195 lb (88 kg)	So	North Surry	Mount Airy, North Carolina
PF	32	Mark Alarie	6 ft 7 in (2.01 m)	215 lb (98 kg)	Sr	Brophy Prep	Phoenix, Arizona
F	33	John Smith	6 ft 7 in (2.01 m)	225 lb (102 kg)	Fr	—	Fort Washington, Maryland
F	35	Danny Ferry	6 ft 10 in (2.08 m)	230 lb (104 kg)	Fr	DeMatha Catholic	Hyattsville, Maryland
F	40	Weldon Williams	6 ft 6 in (1.98 m)	190 lb (86 kg)	Sr	Crete-Monee	Park Forest, Illinois
C	51	Martin Nessley	7 ft 2 in (2.18 m)	260 lb (118 kg)	Jr	Whitehall-Yearling	Whitehall, Ohio
F	55	Billy King	6 ft 6 in (1.98 m)	205 lb (93 kg)	So	Park View	Sterling, Virginia

Head coach

- Mike Krzyzewski

Assistant coach(es)

- Bob Bender
- Tom Rogers
- Chuck Swenson

Legend

- (C) Team captain
- (S) Suspended
- (I) Ineligible
- (W) Walk-on
- Injured
- Current redshirt

== Schedule ==
Date time, TV	Rank^{#}	Opponent^{#}	Result	Record	High points	High rebounds	High assists	Site city, state
Regular season
November 21*; 10:00 p.m., Mizlou	No. 6	vs. Lamar	W 66–62	1–0	18 – Henderson	7 – Alarie, Henderson	4 – Amaker	The Summit (1,250); Houston, TX
November 24*; Mizlou	No. 6	No. 16 UAB	W 66–54	2–0	18 – Dawkins	11 – Ferry	–	The Summit (947); Houston, TX
November 26*; 7:30 p.m.	No. 6	at William & Mary	W 84–61	3–0	28 – Dawkins	7 – Ferry	–	William & Mary Hall (6,400); Williamsburg, VA
November 29*; Mizlou/USA	No. 6	No. 18 St. John's; Preseason NIT Semi-Finals	W 71–70	4–0	20 – Dawkins	8 – Ferry	–	Madison Square Garden; New York, NY
December 1* Mizlou/USA	No. 6	No. 5 Kansas; Preseason NIT Championship	W 92–86	5–0	30 – Henderson	7 – Alarie	–	Madison Square Garden (8,598); New York, NY
December 2*; 7:30 p.m.	No. 6	East Carolina	W 98–66	6–0	25 – Alarie	8 – Alarie	–	Cameron Indoor Stadium (8,564); Durham, NC
December 4*; 7:30 p.m.	No. 3	Vanderbilt	W 84–74	7–0	21 – Dawkins	8 – Ferry	–	Memorial Gymnasium (14,287); Nashville, TN
December 7; 9:00 p.m.	No. 3	Virginia	W 72–64	8–0 (1–0)	24 – Dawkins	10 – Henderson	–	Cameron Indoor Stadium; Durham, NC
December 18*; 7:30 p.m.	No. 3	at Davidson	W 69–52	9–0	13 – Alarie	9 – Ferry	–	Charlotte Coliseum (7,791); Charlotte, NC
December 28*; 1:30 p.m.	No. 3	Appalachian State	W 88–46	10–0	16 – Dawkins	8 – Bilas	–	Cameron Indoor Stadium (8,564); Durham, NC
December 30*; 7:30 p.m.	No. 3	Northwestern	W 78–55	11–0	21 – Dawkins	8 – Ferry	–	Cameron Indoor Stadium (8,564); Durham, NC
January 4; 9:00 p.m.	No. 3	at Maryland; Rivalry	W 81–75	12–0 (2–0)	25 – Henderson	7 – Ferry, Henderson	–	Cole Field House (14,500); College Park, MD
January 8*; 7:30 p.m.	No. 3	St. Louis	W 84–58	13–0	21 – Alarie	6 – Ferry	–	Cameron Indoor Stadium (8,564); Durham, NC
January 11; 12:00 p.m.	No. 3	NC State	W 74–64	14–0 (3–0)	24 – Alarie	8 – Henderson	–	Cameron Indoor Stadium (8,564); Durham, NC
January 13*; 7:00 p.m.	No. 3	at St. Joseph's	W 87–66	15–0	22 – Alarie	9 – Alarie	–	The Palestra (9,208); Philadelphia, PA
January 16; 9:00 p.m.	No. 3	Wake Forest	W 92–63	16–0 (4–0)	17 – Henderson	6 – Bilas, Henderson	–	Cameron Indoor Stadium (8,564); Durham, NC
January 18; 1:30 p.m., Raycom/JP	No. 3	at No. 1 North Carolina; Rivalry	L 92–95	16–1 (4–1)	24 – Henderson	7 – Henderson	–	Dean Smith Center (21,444); Chapel Hill, NC
January 21; 9:00 p.m., ESPN	No. 2	at No. 4 Georgia Tech	L 80–87	16–2 (4–2)	26 – Alarie	8 – Alarie	–	Alexander Memorial Coliseum (7,126); Atlanta, GA
January 25; 9:00 p.m.	No. 2	Maryland	W 80–68	17–2 (5–2)	24 – Dawkins	8 – Bilas	–	Cameron Indoor Stadium (8,564); Durham, NC
January 27*; 7:30 p.m.	No. 2	Harvard	W 89–52	18–2	14 – Henderson	10 – Bilas	–	Cameron Indoor Stadium (8,564); Durham, NC
January 29; 7:30 p.m.	No. 5	Clemson	W 89–78	19–2 (6–2)	29 – Alarie	7 – Alarie	–	Cameron Indoor Stadium (8,564); Durham, NC
February 1; 1:30 p.m.	No. 5	at Wake Forest	W 68–58	20–2 (7–2)	20 – Alarie	9 – Bilas, Ferry, Alarie	–	Greensboro Coliseum (13,300); Greensboro, NC
February 6; 7:30 p.m.	No. 4	at Virginia	W 77–65	21–2 (8–2)	20 – Dawkins, Henderson	7 – Bilas, Ferry	–	University Hall (9,000); Charlottesville, VA
February 9; 1:00 p.m., NBC	No. 4	No. 2 Georgia Tech	W 75–59	22–2 (9–2)	24 – Alarie	9 – Alarie	–	Cameron Indoor Stadium (8,564); Durham, NC
February 11*; 8:00 p.m.	No. 2	Stetson	W 85–66	23–2	18 – Dawkins	10 – Alarie	–	Ocean Center (5,387); Daytona Beach, FL
February 15; 7:30 p.m.	No. 2	No. 17 NC State	W 72–70	24–2 (10–2)	24 – Dawkins	7 – Alarie	–	Reynolds Coliseum (12,400); Raleigh, NC
February 16*; 1:00 p.m., NBC	No. 2	No. 14 Notre Dame	W 75–74	25–2	22 – Alarie	8 – Dawkins	–	Cameron Indoor Stadium (8,564); Durham, NC
February 19*; 7:30 p.m.	No. 2	Miami (FL)	W 104–82	26–2	18 – Alarie	9 – Ferry	–	Cameron Indoor Stadium (8,564); Durham, NC
February 22*; 4:00 p.m., CBS	No. 2	No. 10 Oklahoma	W 93–84	27–2	28 – Henderson	8 – Henderson	–	Cameron Indoor Stadium (8,564); Durham, NC
February 26; 7:30 p.m.	No. 1	Clemson	W 77–69	28–2 (11–2)	27 – Dawkins	11 – Henderson	–	Littlejohn Coliseum (8,736); Clemson, SC
March 2; 1:00 p.m.	No. 1	No. 3 North Carolina	W 82–74	29–2 (12–2)	27 – Henderson	5 – Amaker	–	Cameron Indoor Stadium (8,564); Durham, NC
ACC tournament
March 7*	No. 1	vs. Wake Forest; Quarterfinals	W 68–60	30–2	22 – Alarie	6 – Alarie, Bilas	–	Greensboro Coliseum (16,242); Greensboro, NC
March 8*	No. 1	vs. Virginia; Semifinals	W 75–70	31–2	24 – Dawkins	9 – Henderson	–	Greensboro Coliseum (16,242); Greensboro, NC
March 9*	No. 1	vs. No. 6 Georgia Tech; Championship	W 68–67	32–2	20 – Dawkins	8 – Bilas, Ferry	–	Greensboro Coliseum (16,242); Greensboro, NC
NCAA tournament
March 13*; ESPN (via NCAA Productions)	(1 E) No. 1	vs. (16 E) Mississippi Valley State; First Round	W 85–78	33–2	27 – Dawkins	11 – Ferry	4 – Snyder	Greensboro Coliseum (8,328); Greensboro, NC
March 15*; ESPN	(1 E) No. 1	vs. Old Dominion; Second Round	W 89–61	34–2	25 – Dawkins	14 – Alarie	7 – Amaker	Greensboro Coliseum (12,096); Greensboro, NC
March 21*; ESPN	(1 E) No. 1	DePaul; Sweet Sixteen	W 74–67	35–2	25 – Dawkins	10 – Dawkins	Amaker – Amaker	Brendan Byrne Arena (19,454); East Rutherford, NJ
March 23*; CBS	(1 E) No. 1	No. 17 Navy; Elite Eight	W 71–50	36–2	28 – Dawkins	10 – Bilas	5 – Amaker	Brendan Byrne Arena (19,454); East Rutherford, NJ
March 29*; CBS	(1 E) No. 1	vs. No. 2 Kansas; Final Four	W 71–67	37–2	24 – Dawkins	8 – Alarie	6 – Amaker	Reunion Arena (16,493); Dallas, TX
March 31*; CBS	(1 E) No. 1	vs. No. 7 Louisville; NCAA Championship	L 69–72	37–3	24 – Dawkins	6 – Alarie	7 – Amaker	Reunion Arena (16,493); Dallas, TX
*Non-conference game. ^{#}Rankings from AP Poll. (#) Tournament seedings in parentheses. All times are in Eastern Standard Time.

== Awards and honors ==
- Mike Krzyzewski, ACC Coach of the Year
- Johnny Dawkins, Naismith College Player of the Year

== Team players drafted into the NBA ==
Year	Round	Pick	Player	NBA club
1986	1	10	Johnny Dawkins	San Antonio Spurs
1986	1	18	Mark Alarie	Denver Nuggets
1986	3	58	David Henderson	Washington Bullets
1986	5	108	Jay Bilas	Dallas Mavericks
1987	3	55	Tommy Amaker	Seattle SuperSonics
1987	6	116	Martin Nessley	Los Angeles Clippers
1989	1	2	Danny Ferry	Los Angeles Clippers
