= 1985–86 Maryland Terrapins men's basketball team =

American college basketball season

1985–86 Maryland Terrapins men's basketball

NCAA tournament, second round
- Conference: Atlantic Coast Conference
- Record: 19–14 (6–8 ACC)
- Head coach: Lefty Driesell (17th season)
- Home arena: Cole Field House

1985–86 ACC men's basketball standings
	Conf.				Overall
Team	W		L	PCT	W		L	PCT
No. 1 Duke†	12	–	2	.857	37	–	3	.925
No. 6 Georgia Tech	11	–	3	.786	27	–	7	.794
No. 8 North Carolina	10	–	4	.714	28	–	6	.824
NC State	7	–	7	.500	21	–	13	.618
Virginia	7	–	7	.500	19	–	11	.633
Maryland	6	–	8	.429	19	–	14	.576
Clemson	3	–	11	.214	19	–	15	.559
Wake Forest	0	–	14	.000	8	–	21	.276
† 1986 ACC tournament winner Rankings from AP Poll

The 1985–86 Maryland Terrapins men's basketball team represented the University of Maryland, College Park during the 1985–86 NCAA Division I men's basketball season.

== Roster ==
1985–86 Maryland Terrapins men's basketball team
Players
Coaches

Pos.	#	Name	Height	Weight	Year	Hometown
G	3	Keith Gatlin	6 ft 5 in (1.96 m)	165 lb (75 kg)	Jr	Grimesland, NC
G	12	Jeff Baxter	6 ft 1 in (1.85 m)	165 lb (75 kg)	Sr	Washington, DC
G	22	Walter Lancaster	6 ft 4 in (1.93 m)	180 lb (82 kg)	So	Lanham, MD
C	31	Bryan Palmer	6 ft 10 in (2.08 m)	205 lb (93 kg)	Jr	Glen Rock, PA
F/C	32	Terry Long	6 ft 8 in (2.03 m)	240 lb (109 kg)	Jr	Glen Allen, VA
F	33	Derrick Lewis	6 ft 7 in (2.01 m)	195 lb (88 kg)	So	Temple Hills, MD
F	34	Len Bias	6 ft 8 in (2.03 m)	195 lb (88 kg)	Sr	Landover, MD
F	41	Tom Jones	6 ft 6 in (1.98 m)	205 lb (93 kg)	Sr	Oak Hill, WV
F	50	Ed Woods	6 ft 7 in (2.01 m)	210 lb (95 kg)	So	Rockville, MD

Head coach

- Charles "Lefty" Driesell

Assistant coach(es)

- Mel Cartwright
- Ron Bradley

Legend

- (C) Team captain
- (S) Suspended
- (I) Ineligible
- (W) Walk-on
- Injured
- Current redshirt

Roster

== Schedule ==
Date time, TV	Rank^{#}	Opponent^{#}	Result	Record	Site city, state
November 23*	No. 19	Northeastern	W 84–72	1–0	Cole Field House; College Park, MD
November 26*	No. 17	at George Mason	W 81–80	2–0	Washington, D.C.
November 30*	No. 17	at Ohio State	L 66–78	2–1	Columbus, OH
December 3*		Fairleigh Dickinson	W 74–51	3–1	Cole Field House; College Park, MD
December 5*		William & Mary	W 77–48	4–1	Cole Field House; College Park, MD
December 7*		No. 14 UNLV	L 61–64	4–2	Cole Field House; College Park, MD
December 12*		at West Virginia	W 42–41	5–2	Morgantown, WV
December 13*		Towson State	W 91–58	6–2	Cole Field House; College Park, MD
December 21*		Alabama	W 60–58	7–2	Cole Field House; College Park, MD
December 28*		vs. Stanford; Hawaii-Pacific Tournament	W 67–65	8–2	War Memorial Coliseum
December 29*		at Hawaii Pacific; Hawaii-Pacific Tournament	W 92–85	9–2	War Memorial Coliseum
January 4		Duke	L 75–81	9–3 (0–1)	Cole Field House; College Park, MD
January 7*		Randolph–Macon	W 74–50	10–3	Cole Field House; College Park, MD
January 11		at Georgia Tech	L 67–68	10–4 (0–2)	Atlanta, GA
January 14		No. 1 North Carolina	L 67–71	10–5 (0–3)	Cole Field House; College Park, MD
January 19		at Virginia	L 49–70	10–6 (0–4)	University Hall; Charlottesville, VA
January 23		NC State	L 55–67	10–7 (0–5)	Cole Field House; College Park, MD
January 25		at No. 2 Duke	L 68–80	10–8 (0–6)	Cameron Indoor Stadium; Durham, NC
January 28		Wake Forest	W 77–55	11–8 (1–6)	Cole Field House; College Park, MD
February 1*		at Villanova	L 62–64	11–9	The Pavilion; Villanova, Pennsylvania
February 3*		at No. 14 Notre Dame	L 62–69	11–10	Athletic & Convocation Center; Notre Dame, Indiana
February 8		Clemson	W 78–69	12–10 (2–6)	Cole Field House; College Park, MD
February 13		at No. 17 NC State	W 67–66	13–10 (3–6)	Reynolds Coliseum; Raleigh, NC
February 15		at Clemson	L 60–70	13–11 (3–7)	Littlejohn Coliseum; Clemson, SC
February 17*		Maryland Eastern Shore	W 91–44	14–11	Cole Field House; College Park, MD
February 20		at No. 1 North Carolina	W 77–72 ^{OT}	15–11 (4–7)	Dean Smith Center; Chapel Hill, NC
February 22		No. 5 Georgia Tech	L 70–77	15–12 (4–8)	Cole Field House; College Park, MD
February 26		at Wake Forest	W 59–48	16–12 (5–8)	Greensboro Coliseum; Greensboro, NC
March 1		Virginia	W 87–72	17–12 (6–8)	Cole Field House; College Park, MD
ACC Tournament
March 7*		vs. No. 4 North Carolina; ACC tournament Quarterfinal	W 85–75	18–12	Greensboro Coliseum; Greensboro, NC
March 8*		vs. No. 6 Georgia Tech; ACC Tournament Semifinal	L 62–64	18–13	Greensboro Coliseum; Greensboro, NC
NCAA Tournament
March 14*	(5 W)	vs. (12 W) Pepperdine; NCAA tournament first round	W 69–64	19–13	Long Beach Arena; Long Beach, CA
March 16*	(5 W)	vs. (4 W) No. 11 UNLV; NCAA tournament second round	L 64–70	19–14	Long Beach Arena; Long Beach, CA
*Non-conference game. ^{#}Rankings from AP Poll. (#) Tournament seedings in parentheses. W=West.

== Awards and honors ==
- Len Bias – ACC Player of the Year, Consensus First-team All-American

== Team players in the 1986 NBA draft ==
Round	Pick	Player	NBA club
1	2	Len Bias	Boston Celtics
