= 1985–86 Virginia Cavaliers men's basketball team =

American college basketball season

1985–86 Virginia Cavaliers men's basketball
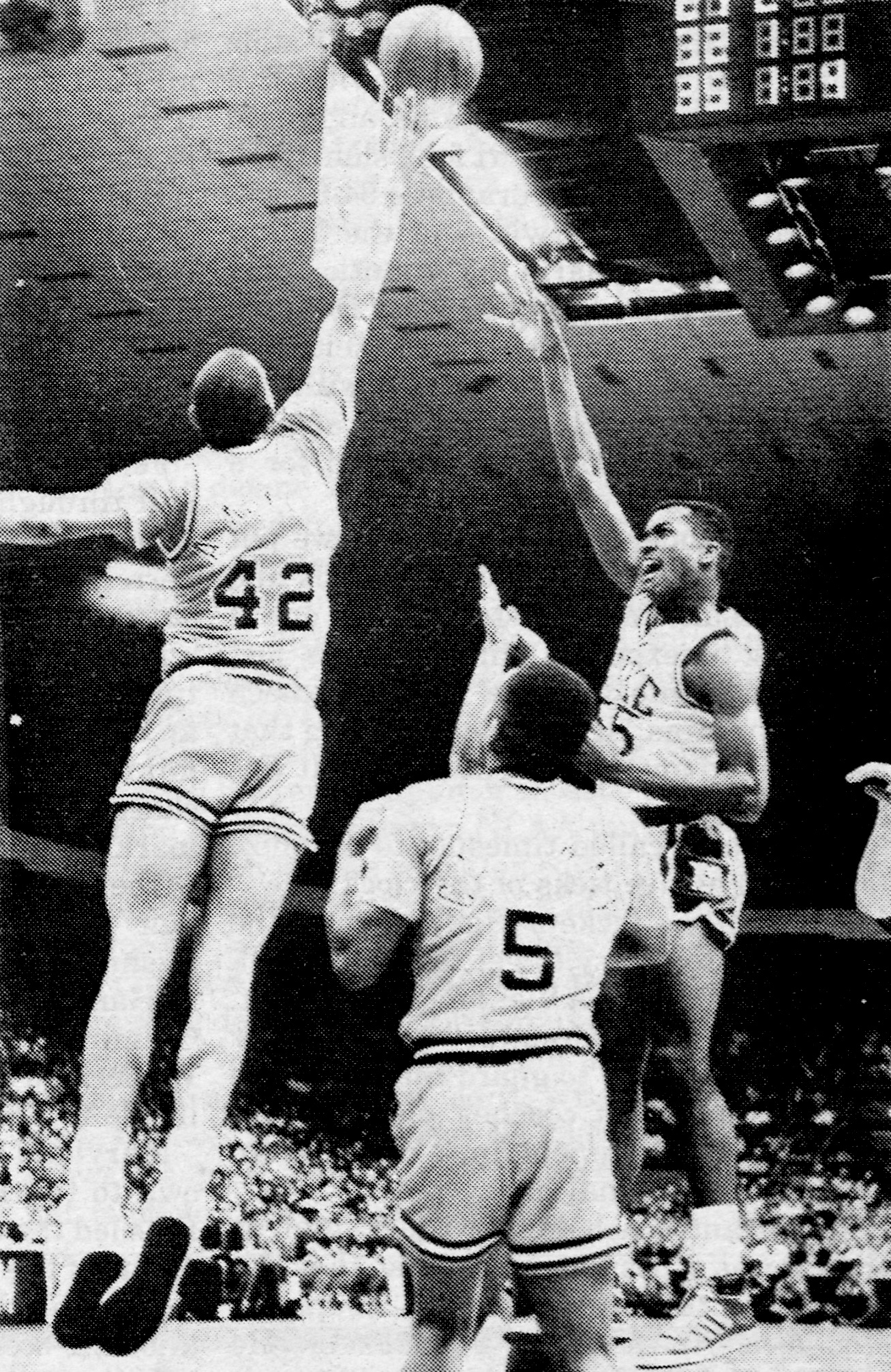
- Billy King Shot, 1986

NCAA tournament, Round of 64
- Conference: Atlantic Coast Conference
- Record: 19–11 (7–7 ACC)
- Head coach: Terry Holland (12th season)
- Assistant coaches: Jim Larrañaga (7th season); Jeff Jones (4th season); Dave Odom (4th season)
- Home arena: University Hall

1985–86 ACC men's basketball standings
	Conf.				Overall
Team	W		L	PCT	W		L	PCT
No. 1 Duke†	12	–	2	.857	37	–	3	.925
No. 6 Georgia Tech	11	–	3	.786	27	–	7	.794
No. 8 North Carolina	10	–	4	.714	28	–	6	.824
NC State	7	–	7	.500	21	–	13	.618
Virginia	7	–	7	.500	19	–	11	.633
Maryland	6	–	8	.429	19	–	14	.576
Clemson	3	–	11	.214	19	–	15	.559
Wake Forest	0	–	14	.000	8	–	21	.276
† 1986 ACC tournament winner Rankings from AP Poll

The 1985–86 Virginia Cavaliers men's basketball team represented the University of Virginia and was a member of the Atlantic Coast Conference during the 1985–86 NCAA Division I men's basketball season. The Cavaliers were led by head coach Terry Holland and played their home games at University Hall in Charlottesville, Virginia.

== Roster ==
1985–86 Virginia Cavaliers men's basketball team
Players
Coaches

Pos.	#	Name	Height	Weight	Year	Hometown
G	5	Tom Calloway	6 ft 0 in (1.83 m)	180 lb (82 kg)	Jr	Charlottesville, Virginia
G	10	John Johnson	6 ft 0 in (1.83 m)	160 lb (73 kg)	So	New York City, New York
G	11	Richard Morgan	6 ft 3 in (1.91 m)	190 lb (86 kg)	Fr	Salem, Virginia
G	12	Anthony Solomon	5 ft 10 in (1.78 m)	160 lb (73 kg)	Jr	Newport News, Virginia
F	14	Bill Batts	6 ft 8 in (2.03 m)	200 lb (91 kg)	Fr	South Euclid, Ohio
G	20	Darrick Sims	6 ft 3 in (1.91 m)	213 lb (97 kg)	So	Alexandria, Virginia
G/F	21	Mel Kennedy	6 ft 5 in (1.96 m)	215 lb (98 kg)	So	Long Island, New York
F	22	Tom Sheehey	6 ft 9 in (2.06 m)	217 lb (98 kg)	Jr	Rochester, New York
F	24	Olden Polynice	6 ft 11 in (2.11 m)	210 lb (95 kg)	Jr	Port-au-Prince, Haiti
G	32	Lance Blanks	6 ft 4 in (1.93 m)	190 lb (86 kg)	Fr	The Woodlands, Texas
F	42	Andrew Kennedy	6 ft 7 in (2.01 m)	205 lb (93 kg)	Jr	Kingston, Jamaica
G	44	Kenny Lambiotte	6 ft 4 in (1.93 m)	195 lb (88 kg)	Sr	Woodstock, Virginia
F/C	52	John Dyslin	6 ft 11 in (2.11 m)	210 lb (95 kg)	So	Knoxville, Tennessee
C	54	Tim Martin	6 ft 11 in (2.11 m)	240 lb (109 kg)	So	Ridgeway, Virginia

Head coach

- Terry Holland (Davidson)

Assistant coach(es)

- Jim Larrañaga (Providence)
- Jeff Jones (Virginia)
- Dave Odom (Guilford)

Legend

- (C) Team captain
- (S) Suspended
- (I) Ineligible
- (W) Walk-on
- Injured
- Current redshirt

== Schedule and results ==
Date time, TV	Rank^{#}	Opponent^{#}	Result	Record	Site (attendance) city, state
Non-conference regular season
Nov 23, 1985*		vs. Houston	W 92–77	1–0	Capital Centre; Landover, Maryland
Nov 30, 1985*		Towson State	W 68–55	2–0	University Hall; Charlottesville, Virginia
Dec 1, 1985*		VCU	W 79–75 ^{OT}	3–0	University Hall; Charlottesville, Virginia
Dec 4, 1985*		VMI	W 101–58	4–0	University Hall; Charlottesville, Virginia
Dec 7, 1985		at No. 3 Duke	L 64–72	4–1 (0–1)	Cameron Indoor Stadium; Durham, North Carolina
Dec 10, 1985*		vs. Virginia Tech	L 66–84	4–2	Roanoke Civic Center; Roanoke, Virginia
Dec 20, 1985*		vs. Old Dominion	W 68–61	5–2	Richmond Coliseum; Richmond, Virginia
Dec 21, 1985*		vs. Richmond	L 46–58	5–3	Richmond Coliseum; Richmond, Virginia
Dec 27, 1985*		vs. Long Island	W 71–52	6–3	Rochester Community War Memorial; Rochester, New York
Dec 28, 1985*		vs. Loyola–Chicago	W 71–70	7–3	Rochester Community War Memorial; Rochester, New York
Jan 2, 1986*		Hartford	W 73–54	8–3	University Hall; Charlottesville, Virginia
ACC regular season
Jan 4, 1986		No. 6 Georgia Tech	L 61–64	8–4 (0–2)	University Hall; Charlottesville, Virginia
Jan 4, 1986*		William & Mary	W 67–47	9–4	University Hall; Charlottesville, Virginia
Jan 11, 1986		at Clemson	W 83–81	10–4 (1–2)	Littlejohn Coliseum; Clemson, South Carolina
Jan 14, 1986*		Penn	W 81–52	11–4	University Hall; Charlottesville, Virginia
Jan 19, 1986		Maryland	W 70–49	12–4 (2–2)	University Hall; Charlottesville, Virginia
Jan 22, 1986		Wake Forest	W 54–47	13–4 (3–2)	University Hall; Charlottesville, Virginia
Jan 25, 1986		at NC State	L 53–55	13–5 (3–3)	Reynolds Coliseum; Raleigh, North Carolina
Jan 30, 1986		No. 1 North Carolina	W 86–73	14–5 (4–3)	University Hall; Charlottesville, Virginia
Feb 6, 1986		No. 4 Duke	L 65–77	14–6 (4–4)	University Hall; Charlottesville, Virginia
Feb 9, 1986*		at Missouri	W 64–62	15–6	Hearnes Center; Columbia, Missouri
Feb 12, 1986		at Wake Forest	W 69–53	16–6 (5–4)	Winston-Salem War Memorial Coliseum; Winston-Salem, North Carolina
Feb 15, 1986		at No. 5 Georgia Tech	L 55–62	16–7 (5–5)	Alexander Memorial Coliseum; Atlanta, Georgia
Feb 19, 1986		No. 20 NC State	W 69–60	17–7 (6–5)	University Hall; Charlottesville, Virginia
Feb 22, 1986		Clemson	W 82–69	18–7 (7–5)	University Hall; Charlottesville, Virginia
Feb 26, 1986		at No. 3 North Carolina	L 79–85	18–8 (7–6)	Dean Smith Center; Chapel Hill, North Carolina
Mar 1, 1986		at Maryland	L 72–87	18–9 (7–7)	Cole Field House; College Park, Maryland
ACC Tournament
Mar 7, 1986*	(5)	at (4) No. 20 NC State; Quarterfinals	W 64–62	19–9	Greensboro Coliseum; Greensboro, North Carolina
Mar 8, 1986*	(5)	vs. (1) No. 1 Duke; Semifinals	L 70–75	19–10	Greensboro Coliseum; Greensboro, North Carolina
NCAA Tournament
Mar 13, 1986*	(5 E)	vs. (12 E) DePaul; First Round	L 68–72	19–11	Greensboro Coliseum (7,640); Greensboro, North Carolina
*Non-conference game. ^{#}Rankings from AP Poll. (#) Tournament seedings in parentheses. E=East. All times are in Eastern Time.
