= 1985–86 Georgia Tech Yellow Jackets men's basketball team =

American college basketball season

1985–86 Georgia Tech Yellow Jackets men's basketball

NCAA tournament, regional semifinals
- Conference: Atlantic Coast Conference

Ranking
- Coaches: No. 6
- AP: No. 6
- Record: 27–7 (11–3 ACC)
- Head coach: Bobby Cremins (5th season)
- Assistant coaches: George Felton (5th season); Perry Clark (4th season); Jimmy Hebron (5th season); Rich Brown (2nd season)
- Home arena: Alexander Memorial Coliseum

1985–86 ACC men's basketball standings
	Conf.				Overall
Team	W		L	PCT	W		L	PCT
No. 1 Duke†	12	–	2	.857	37	–	3	.925
No. 6 Georgia Tech	11	–	3	.786	27	–	7	.794
No. 8 North Carolina	10	–	4	.714	28	–	6	.824
NC State	7	–	7	.500	21	–	13	.618
Virginia	7	–	7	.500	19	–	11	.633
Maryland	6	–	8	.429	19	–	14	.576
Clemson	3	–	11	.214	19	–	15	.559
Wake Forest	0	–	14	.000	8	–	21	.276
† 1986 ACC tournament winner Rankings from AP Poll

The 1985–86 Georgia Tech Yellow Jackets men's basketball team represented Georgia Institute of Technology during the 1985–86 NCAA Division I men's basketball season.

== Roster ==
1985–86 Georgia Tech Yellow Jackets men's basketball team
Players
Coaches

Pos.	#	Name	Height	Weight	Year	Hometown
G	10	Craig Neal	6 ft 4 in (1.93 m)	165 lb (75 kg)	So	Washington, Indiana
F	20	Tom Hammonds	6 ft 9 in (2.06 m)	210 lb (95 kg)	Fr	Crestview, Florida
C	22	John Salley	6 ft 11 in (2.11 m)	230 lb (104 kg)	Sr	Brooklyn, New York
G	25	Mark Price	6 ft 0 in (1.83 m)	170 lb (77 kg)	Sr	Enid, Oklahoma
G	33	Duane Ferrell	6 ft 7 in (2.01 m)	205 lb (93 kg)	So	Baltimore, Maryland
G	45	Bruce Dalrymple	6 ft 4 in (1.93 m)	210 lb (95 kg)	Jr	Manhattan, New York

Head coach

- Bobby Cremins (South Carolina)

Assistant coach(es)

- George Felton (South Carolina)
- Perry Clark (Gettysburg)
- Jimmy Hebron
- Rich Brown

Legend

- (C) Team captain
- (S) Suspended
- (I) Ineligible
- (W) Walk-on
- Injured
- Current redshirt

- G Dalrymple
- F Ferrell
- C Ford
- F Hammonds
- F Mansell
- G Martinson
- G Neal
- G Price
- F Reese
- F/C Salley
- G Sherrod

== Schedule and results ==
Date time, TV	Rank^{#}	Opponent^{#}	Result	Record	Site city, state
Non-conference Regular season
Nov 25, 1985*	No. 2	USC Aiken	W 119–60	1–0	Alexander Memorial Coliseum; Atlanta, Georgia
Nov 30, 1985*	No. 2	vs. No. 3 Michigan; Hall of Fame Tip-Off Classic	L 44–49	1–1	Springfield Civic Center; Springfield, Massachusetts
Dec 2, 1985*	No. 2	at Saint Louis	W 62–55	2–1	Kiel Auditorium; St. Louis, Missouri
Dec 4, 1985*	No. 5	at Chattanooga	W 94–74	3–1	McKenzie Arena; Chattanooga, Tennessee
Dec 7, 1985*	No. 5	vs. Georgia	W 89–65	4–1	The Omni; Atlanta, Georgia
Dec 17, 1985*	No. 7	Old Dominion	W 96–86	5–1	Alexander Memorial Coliseum; Atlanta, Georgia
Dec 20, 1985*	No. 7	vs. Texas A&M; Gator Bowl Tournament	W 83–58	6–1	Jacksonville Memorial Coliseum; Jacksonville, Florida
Dec 21, 1985*	No. 7	at Jacksonville; Gator Bowl Tournament	W 72–53	7–1	Jacksonville Memorial Coliseum; Jacksonville, Florida
Dec 27, 1985*	No. 7	Texas; Cotton States Classic	W 90–55	8–1	The Omni; Atlanta, Georgia
Dec 28, 1985*	No. 7	Navy; Cotton States Classic	W 82–64	9–1	The Omni; Atlanta, Georgia
Dec 30, 1985*	No. 6	Richmond	W 90–64	10–1	Alexander Memorial Coliseum; Atlanta, Georgia
ACC regular season
Jan 4, 1986	No. 6	at Virginia	W 64–61	11–1 (1–0)	University Hall; Charlottesville, Virginia
Jan 8, 1986	No. 5	Wake Forest	W 72–58	12–1 (2–0)	Alexander Memorial Coliseum; Atlanta, Georgia
Jan 9, 1986*	No. 5	vs. Rutgers	W 85–46	13–1	Madison Square Garden; New York, New York
Jan 11, 1986	No. 5	Maryland	W 68–67	14–1 (3–0)	Alexander Memorial Coliseum; Atlanta, Georgia
Jan 18, 1986	No. 5	at Clemson	W 83–71	15–1 (4–0)	Littlejohn Coliseum; Clemson, South Carolina
Jan 21, 1986	No. 4	No. 2 Duke	W 87–80	16–1 (5–0)	Alexander Memorial Coliseum; Atlanta, Georgia
Jan 25, 1986	No. 4	at No. 1 North Carolina	L 77–85	16–2 (5–1)	Dean Smith Center; Chapel Hill, North Carolina
Jan 29, 1986	No. 3	at NC State	W 67–54	17–2 (6–1)	Reynolds Coliseum; Raleigh, North Carolina
Feb 4, 1986	No. 2	No. 1 North Carolina	L 77–78 ^{OT}	17–3 (6–2)	The Omni; Atlanta, Georgia
Feb 6, 1986*	No. 2	at Charlotte	W 87–76	18–3	Charlotte Coliseum; Charlotte, North Carolina
Feb 9, 1986	No. 2	at No. 4 Duke	L 59–75	18–4 (6–3)	Cameron Indoor Stadium; Durham, North Carolina
Feb 15, 1986	No. 5	Virginia	W 62–55	19–4 (7–3)	Alexander Memorial Coliseum; Atlanta, Georgia
Feb 19, 1986	No. 5	at Wake Forest	W 59–49	20–4 (8–3)	Winston-Salem Memorial Coliseum; Winston-Salem, North Carolina
Feb 22, 1986	No. 5	at Maryland	W 77–70	21–4 (9–3)	Cole Fieldhouse; College Park, Maryland
Feb 27, 1986	No. 4	No. 18 NC State	W 69–57	22–4 (10–3)	Alexander Memorial Coliseum; Atlanta, Georgia
Mar 1, 1986*	No. 4	Illinois	L 57–59	22–5	Alexander Memorial Coliseum (15,148); Atlanta, Georgia
Mar 2, 1986	No. 6	Clemson	W 74–63	23–5 (11–3)	Alexander Memorial Coliseum; Atlanta, Georgia
ACC Tournament
Mar 7, 1986*	No. 6	vs. Clemson; ACC Tournament Quarterfinal	W 79–61	24–5	Greensboro Coliseum; Greensboro, North Carolina
Mar 8, 1986*	No. 6	vs. Maryland; ACC Tournament Semifinal	W 64–62	25–5	Greensboro Coliseum; Greensboro, North Carolina
Mar 9, 1986*	No. 6	vs. No. 1 Duke; ACC tournament championship	L 67–68	25–6	Greensboro Coliseum; Greensboro, North Carolina
NCAA Tournament
Mar 13, 1986*	(2 SE) No. 6	vs. (15 SE) Marist; First round	W 68–53	26–6	LSU Assembly Center; Baton Rouge, Louisiana
Mar 15, 1986*	(2 SE) No. 6	vs. (10 SE) Villanova; Second Round	W 66–61	27–6	LSU Assembly Center; Baton Rouge, Louisiana
Mar 20, 1986*	(2 SE) No. 6	vs. (11 SE) LSU; Southeast Regional semifinal – Sweet Sixteen	L 64–70	27–7	The Omni; Atlanta, Georgia
*Non-conference game. ^{#}Rankings from AP Poll. (#) Tournament seedings in parentheses. SE=Southeast. All times are in Eastern Time.

== Players in the 1986 NBA draft ==
Round	Pick	Player	NBA club
1	11	John Salley	Detroit Pistons
2	25	Mark Price	Dallas Mavericks
