= 1985–86 North Carolina Tar Heels men's basketball team =

American college basketball season

1985–86 North Carolina Tar Heels men's basketball

Great Alaska Shootout Champions

NCAA tournament, Sweet Sixteen
- Conference: Atlantic Coast Conference

Ranking
- Coaches: No. 8
- AP: No. 8
- Record: 28–6 (10–4 ACC)
- Head coach: Dean Smith (24th season)
- Assistant coaches: Bill Guthridge (18th season); Eddie Fogler (15th season); Roy Williams (8th season)
- Home arena: Carmichael Auditorium; Dean Smith Center

1985–86 ACC men's basketball standings
	Conf.				Overall
Team	W		L	PCT	W		L	PCT
No. 1 Duke†	12	–	2	.857	37	–	3	.925
No. 6 Georgia Tech	11	–	3	.786	27	–	7	.794
No. 8 North Carolina	10	–	4	.714	28	–	6	.824
NC State	7	–	7	.500	21	–	13	.618
Virginia	7	–	7	.500	19	–	11	.633
Maryland	6	–	8	.429	19	–	14	.576
Clemson	3	–	11	.214	19	–	15	.559
Wake Forest	0	–	14	.000	8	–	21	.276
† 1986 ACC tournament winner Rankings from AP Poll

The 1985–86 North Carolina Tar Heels men's basketball team represented the University of North Carolina at Chapel Hill during the 1985–86 NCAA Division I men's basketball season.

Led by head coach Dean Smith, the Tar Heels held the #1 ranking in the AP poll for 13 consecutive weeks and reached the Sweet Sixteen in the NCAA tournament before falling to eventual national champions Louisville.

On January 18, 1986, #1 North Carolina defeated #3 Duke 95–92 in the first game played at the Dean Smith Center.

== Schedule and results ==
Date time, TV	Rank^{#}	Opponent^{#}	Result	Record	Site city, state
Regular season
Nov 24, 1985*	No. 2	UCLA	W 107–70	1–0	Carmichael Auditorium (10,000); Chapel Hill, NC
Nov 25, 1985*	No. 1	Iona	W 110–67	2–0	Carmichael Auditorium; Chapel Hill, NC
Nov 29, 1985*	No. 1	vs. Missouri; Great Alaska Shootout	W 84–63	3–0	Sullivan Arena; Anchorage, AK
Nov 30, 1985*	No. 1	vs. Purdue; Great Alaska Shootout	W 73–62	4–0	Sullivan Arena; Anchorage, AK
Dec 1, 1985*	No. 1	vs. No. 16 UNLV; Great Alaska Shootout	W 65–60	5–0	Sullivan Arena; Anchorage, AK
Dec 7, 1985*	No. 1	vs. Rutgers	W 114–71	6–0	Greensboro Coliseum; Greensboro, NC
Dec 14, 1985*	No. 1	Ohio	W 99–57	7–0	Carmichael Auditorium; Chapel Hill, NC
Dec 17, 1985*	No. 1	at Jacksonville	W 69–65	8–0	Jacksonville Memorial Coliseum; Jacksonville, FL
Dec 20, 1985*	No. 1	Stanford	W 89–55	9–0	Carmichael Auditorium; Chapel Hill, NC
Dec 22, 1985*	No. 1	vs. The Citadel	W 104–51	10–0	Charlotte Coliseum; Charlotte, NC
Dec 27, 1985*	No. 1	vs. Manhattan; Orange Bowl Tournament	W 129–45	11–0	Knight Center; Miami, FL
Dec 28, 1985*	No. 1	vs. Brown; Orange Bowl Tournament	W 115–63	12–0	Knight Center; Miami, FL
Dec 31, 1985*	No. 1	vs. Florida State	W 109–64	13–0	Charlotte Coliseum; Charlotte, NC
Jan 4, 1986	No. 1	NC State; Rivalry	W 90–79	14–0 (1–0)	Carmichael Auditorium; Chapel Hill, NC
Jan 9, 1986*	No. 1	vs. Fordham	W 92–68	15–0	Madison Square Garden; New York, NY
Jan 11, 1986	No. 1	at Wake Forest	W 89–65	16–0 (2–0)	Winston-Salem Memorial Coliseum; Winston-Salem, NC
Jan 14, 1986	No. 1	at Maryland	W 71–67	17–0 (3–0)	Cole Fieldhouse; College Park, MD
Jan 18, 1986	No. 1	No. 3 Duke; Rivalry	W 95–92	18–0 (4–0)	Dean Smith Center (21,444); Chapel Hill, NC
Jan 19, 1986*	No. 1	at Marquette	W 66–64	19–0	MECCA Arena; Milwaukee, WI
Jan 25, 1986	No. 1	No. 4 Georgia Tech	W 85–77	20–0 (5–0)	Dean Smith Center; Chapel Hill, NC
Jan 26, 1986*	No. 1	No. 16 Notre Dame	W 73–61	21–0	Dean Smith Center; Chapel Hill, NC
Jan 30, 1986	No. 1	at Virginia	L 73–86	21–1 (5–1)	University Hall; Charlottesville, VA
Feb 1, 1986	No. 1	Clemson	W 85–67	22–1 (6–1)	Dean Smith Center; Chapel Hill, NC
Feb 4, 1986	No. 1	at No. 2 Georgia Tech	W 78–77	23–1 (7–1)	Omni Coliseum; Atlanta, GA
Feb 8, 1986	No. 1	Wake Forest	W 91–62	24–1 (8–1)	Dean Smith Center; Chapel Hill, NC
Feb 12, 1986	No. 1	at Clemson	W 79–64	25–1 (9–1)	Littlejohn Coliseum; Clemson, SC
Feb 20, 1986	No. 1	Maryland	L 72–77	25–2 (9–2)	Dean Smith Center; Chapel Hill, NC
Feb 23, 1986	No. 1	at No. 20 NC State; Rivalry	L 65–76	25–3 (9–3)	Reynolds Coliseum; Raleigh, NC
Feb 26, 1986	No. 3	Virginia	W 85–79	26–3 (10–3)	Dean Smith Center; Chapel Hill, NC
Mar 2, 1986	No. 3	at No. 1 Duke; Rivalry	L 74–82	26–4 (10–4)	Cameron Indoor Stadium; Durham, NC
ACC Tournament
Mar 7, 1986*	No. 4	Maryland; ACC tournament Quarterfinal	L 75–85	26–5	Greensboro Coliseum; Greensboro, NC
NCAA Tournament
Mar 13, 1986*	(3) No. 8	vs. (14) Utah; First round	W 84–72	27–5	Dee Events Center; Ogden, UT
Mar 15, 1986*	(3) No. 8	vs. (6) UAB; Second Round	W 77–59	28–5	Dee Events Center; Ogden, UT
Mar 20, 1986*	(3) No. 8	vs. (2) No. 7 Louisville; Regional semifinal	L 79–94	28–6	The Summit; Houston, TX
*Non-conference game. ^{#}Rankings from AP Poll. (#) Tournament seedings in parentheses. W=West region. All times are in Eastern Time.
