= Mike Krzyzewski =

American basketball player and coach (born 1947)

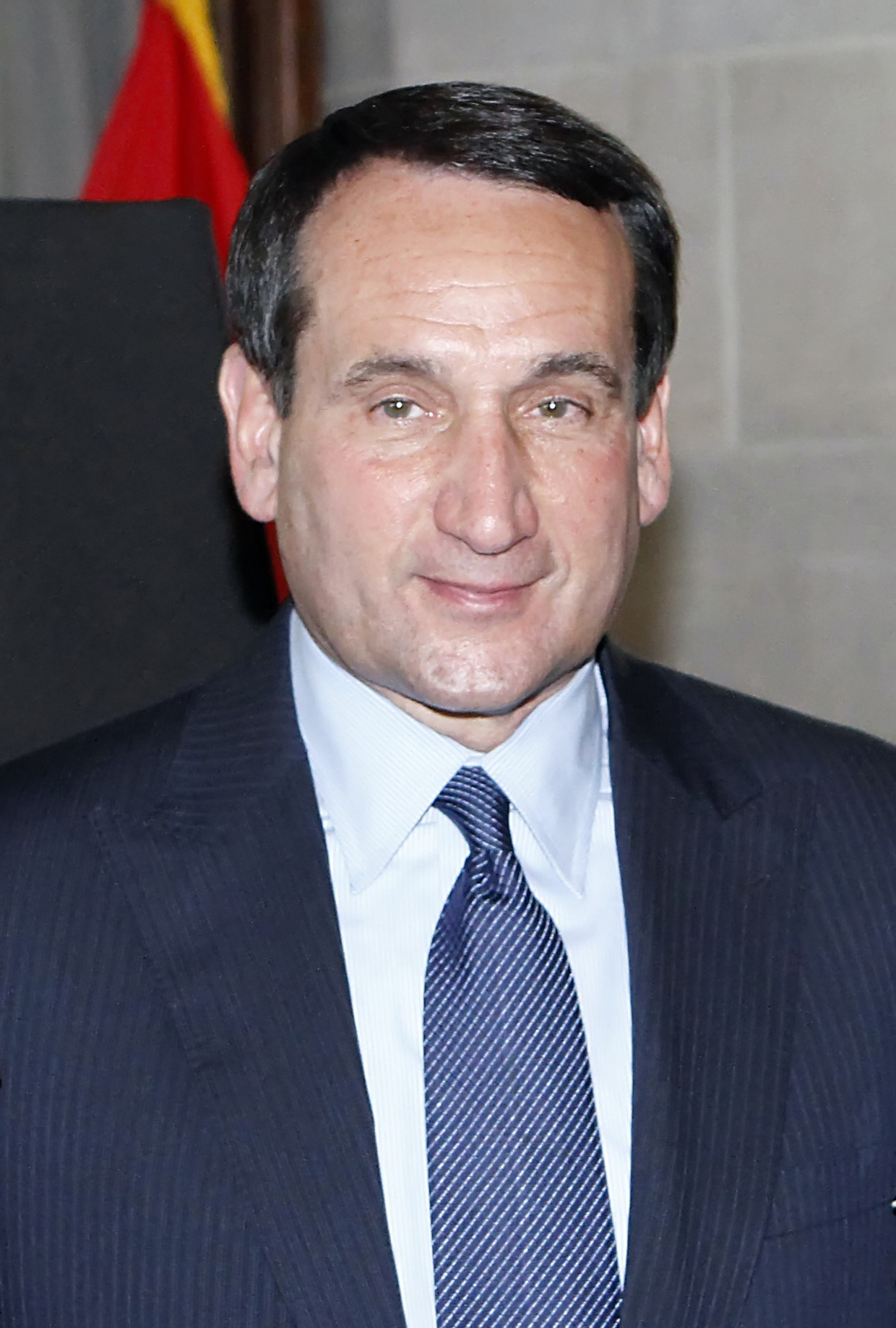
- Krzyzewski in 2011

Biographical details
- Born: February 13, 1947 (age 79); Chicago, Illinois, U.S.

Playing career

Basketball
- 1966–1969: Army
- Position: Point guard / shooting guard

Coaching career (HC unless noted)
- 1974–1975: Indiana (assistant)
- 1975–1980: Army
- 1980–2022: Duke

Head coaching record
- Overall: 1,202–368
- Tournaments: 101–30 (NCAA Division I); 2–2 (NIT); 69–24 (ACC)

Accomplishments and honors

Championships
- 5 NCAA Division I tournament (1991, 1992, 2001, 2010, 2015); 13 NCAA Division I tournament Final Four (1986, 1988–1992, 1994, 1999, 2001, 2004, 2010, 2015, 2022); 15 ACC tournament (1986, 1988, 1992, 1999–2003, 2005, 2006, 2009–2011, 2017, 2019); 13 ACC regular season (1986, 1991, 1992, 1994, 1997–2001, 2004, 2006, 2010, 2022)

Awards
- The Sporting News Sportsman of the Year (1992); Sports Illustrated Sportsman of the Year (2011); 3× Naismith College Coach of the Year (1989, 1992, 1999); 2× NABC Coach of the Year (1991, 1999); Clair Bee Coach of the Year (2004); UPI Coach of the Year (1986); 5× ACC Coach of the Year (1984, 1986, 1997, 1999, 2000)
- Basketball Hall of Fame; Inducted in 2001 (profile)
- College Basketball Hall of Fame; Inducted in 2006
Medal record
Head coach for United States
men's national basketball team
Olympic Games
Gold medal – first place	2008 Beijing	Team
Gold medal – first place	2012 London	Team
Gold medal – first place	2016 Rio de Janeiro	Team
FIBA World Championship
Gold medal – first place	2010 Turkey	Team
Gold medal – first place	2014 Spain	Team
Bronze medal – third place	1990 Argentina
Bronze medal – third place	2006 Japan
FIBA Americas Championship
Gold medal – first place	2007 Las Vegas
Assistant coach for United States
men's national basketball team
Olympic Games
Gold medal – first place	1984 Los Angeles	Team
Gold medal – first place	1992 Barcelona	Team
FIBA Americas Championship
Gold medal – first place	1992 Portland

Michael William Krzyzewski (US: /ʃɪˈʒɛfski/ shizh-EF-skee, Polish: [kʂɨˈʐɛfskʲi]; born February 13, 1947), nicknamed "Coach K", is an American former college basketball coach. He served as the head coach at Duke University from 1980 to 2022, during which he led the Blue Devils to five national titles, 13 Final Four appearances, 15 ACC tournament championships, and 13 ACC regular season titles. Among men's college basketball coaches, only UCLA's John Wooden has won more NCAA championships (10). Krzyzewski is widely regarded as one of the greatest college basketball coaches of all time.

Krzyzewski has also coached the United States national team, which he led to gold medals at the 2008, 2012, and 2016 Olympics. He was the head coach of the U.S. team that won gold medals at the 2010 and the 2014 FIBA World Cup, and an assistant coach for the "Dream Team" at the 1992 Olympics.

Krzyzewski was a point guard at Army from 1966 to 1969 under coach Bob Knight. From 1975 to 1980, he was the head coach for his alma mater. He is a three-time inductee into the Naismith Memorial Basketball Hall of Fame, in 2001 for his individual coaching career, in 2010 as part of the collective induction of the 1992 United States men's Olympic basketball team ("Dream Team"), and in 2025 as head coach of the 2008 United States men's Olympic basketball team ("Redeem Team"). He was inducted into the College Basketball Hall of Fame in 2006, and the United States Olympic Hall of Fame in 2009 (with the "Dream Team").

On November 15, 2011, Krzyzewski led Duke to a 74–69 victory over Michigan State at Madison Square Garden to become the coach with the most wins in NCAA Division I men's basketball history. Krzyzewski's 903rd victory set a new record, breaking that held by his former coach, Bob Knight. On January 25, 2015, Duke defeated St. John's, 77–68, again at Madison Square Garden, as Krzyzewski became the first Division I men's coach to reach 1,000 wins.

== Early life and education ==
Krzyzewski was born in Chicago, the son of Polish American parents Emily M. (née Pituch) and William Krzyzewski and was raised as a Catholic. His father changed his last name to Kross, and worked as an elevator operator and owned a bar in downtown Chicago. Krzyzewski attended St. Helen Catholic School in Ukrainian Village, Chicago and, later, Archbishop Weber High School in Chicago, a Catholic prep school for boys.

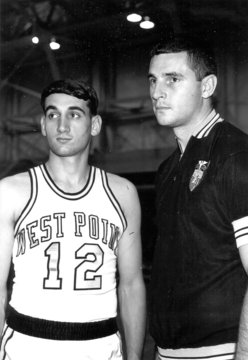
Krzyzewski with coach Bob Knight

He was captain of the Army basketball team in his senior season, 1968–69, leading the Cadets to the National Invitation Tournament (NIT) at Madison Square Garden in New York City, where West Point finished fourth.

From 1969 to 1974, Krzyzewski served as an officer in the U.S. Army and directed service teams for three years. In 2005, he was presented West Point's Distinguished Graduate Award.

He graduated from the U.S. Military Academy at West Point, New York, in 1969. He comes from a working-class family and is a first-generation college student.

== Coaching career ==
=== Indiana and Army ===
He was discharged from active duty in 1974 with the rank of captain, and started his coaching career as an assistant on Knight's staff with the Indiana Hoosiers during their historic 1974–75 season. After one year with Indiana, Krzyzewski returned to West Point as head coach at age 28; in his five seasons, he led the Army Cadets to a 73–59 (.553) record and an NIT berth in 1978.

=== Duke ===
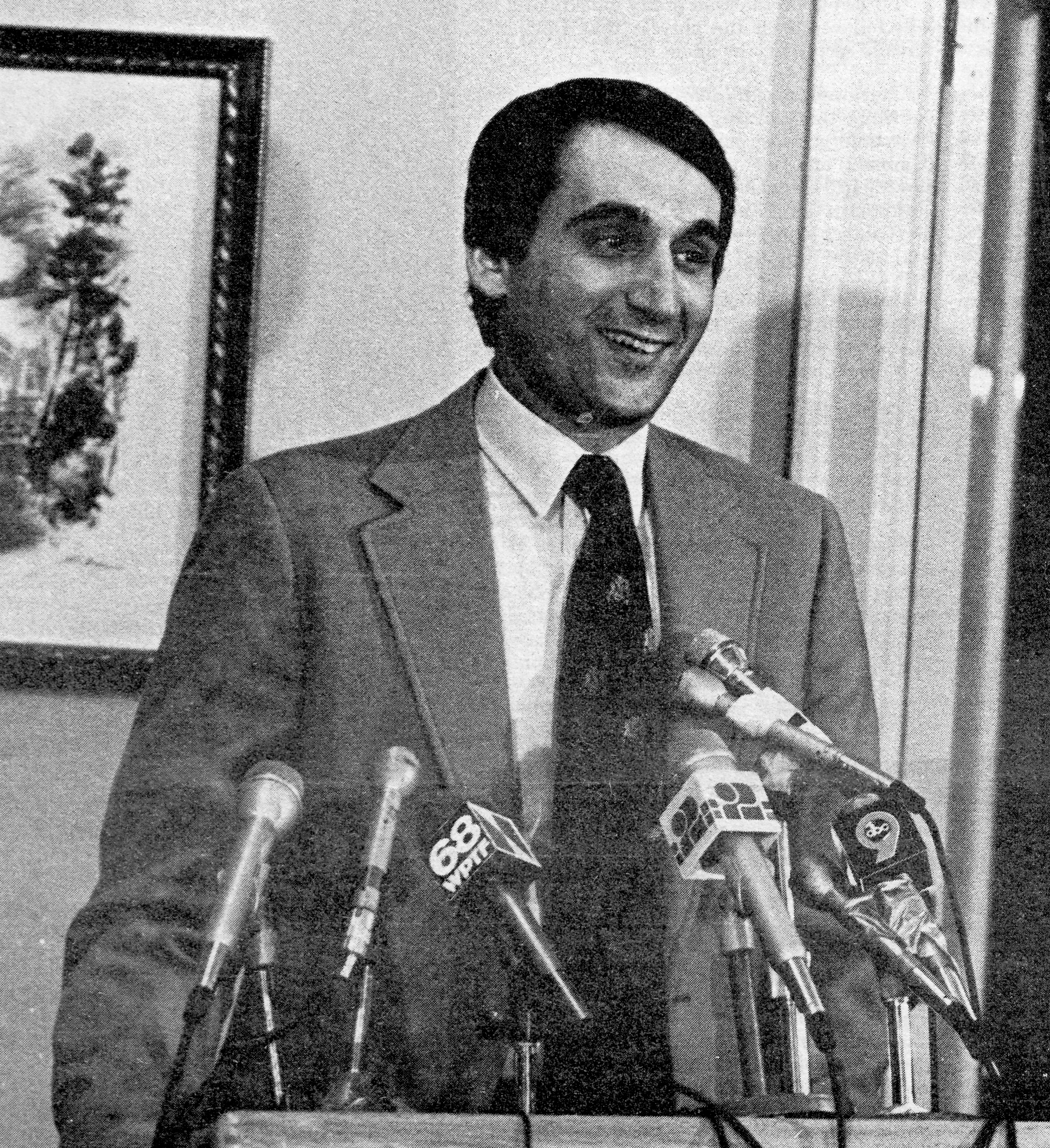
Krzyzewski speaks to reporters after being named Duke's head coach on March 18, 1980.

On March 18, 1980, Krzyzewski was named the head coach at Duke University after five seasons at Army. After a few rebuilding seasons, he and the Blue Devils became a fixture on the national basketball scene with 35 NCAA Tournament berths in the past 36 years and 24 consecutive from 1996 to 2019, behind Kansas which has appeared in the tournament in 30 consecutive seasons. Overall, he has taken his program to postseason play in 36 of his 39 years at Duke and is the winningest coach in men's NCAA Tournament play with a 100–30 record for a .769 winning percentage. His Duke teams won 15 ACC Championships, went to 13 Final Fours, and won five NCAA tournament National Championships.

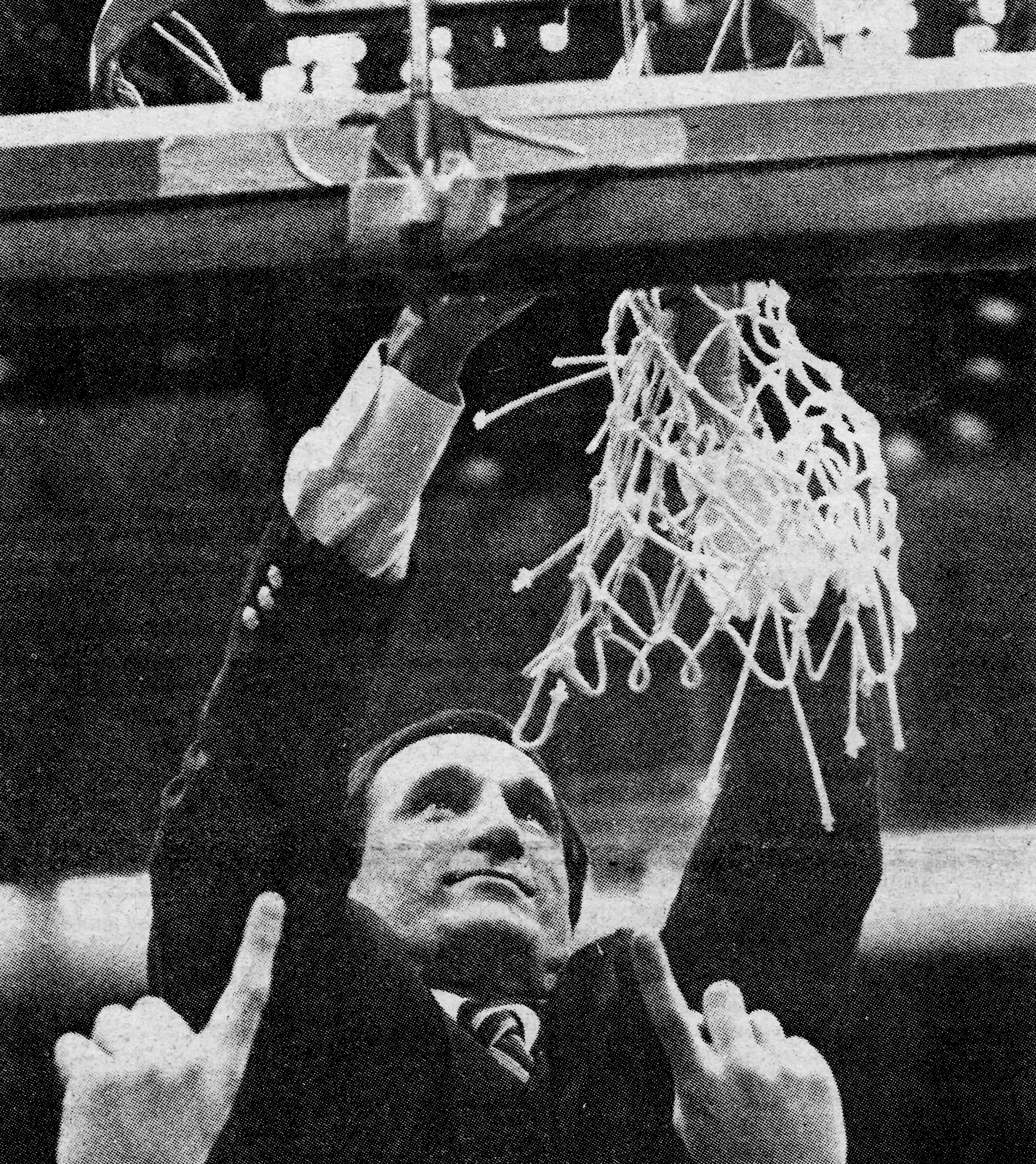
Krzyzewski cutting down the nets after winning the 1986 ACC tournament

Krzyzewski had surgery to repair a ruptured disk in his back in October 1994, but insisted on returning to the sidelines for the 1994–95 season, using a special stool to keep him off his feet. However, the pain became so debilitating that he went several days without sleeping early in the season. By the start of ACC play, the pain had progressed to a point that he could not continue. Shortly after the first game of ACC play, Krzyzewski told his players and coaches that he was taking a leave of absence, with longtime assistant Pete Gaudet serving as interim head coach for the remainder of the season. He had actually planned to resign, but athletic director Tom Butters persuaded him to take a leave of absence instead. Per longstanding NCAA guidance, Duke only credits the first 12 games of the season to Krzyzewski and credits the remainder of the season to Gaudet. Years later, Krzyzewski said that he probably would have been out of basketball if he had not endured that season, since it made him realize he needed to manage his time better and delegate more responsibility.

On February 13, 2010 – his 63rd birthday – Krzyzweski coached in his 1,000th game as the Duke head coach. On March 20, 2011, Krzyzewski won his 900th game, becoming the second of three Division I men's basketball coaches to reach 900 basketball wins, the other two being Jim Boeheim at Syracuse and his head coach at Army, Bob Knight. On November 15, 2011, Krzyzewski got his 903rd win passing Knight's record for most Division I wins. In an interview of both men on ESPN the previous night, Krzyzewski discussed the leadership skills he learned from Knight and the United States Military Academy. Knight credited Krzyzewski's understanding of himself and his players as keys to his success over the years.

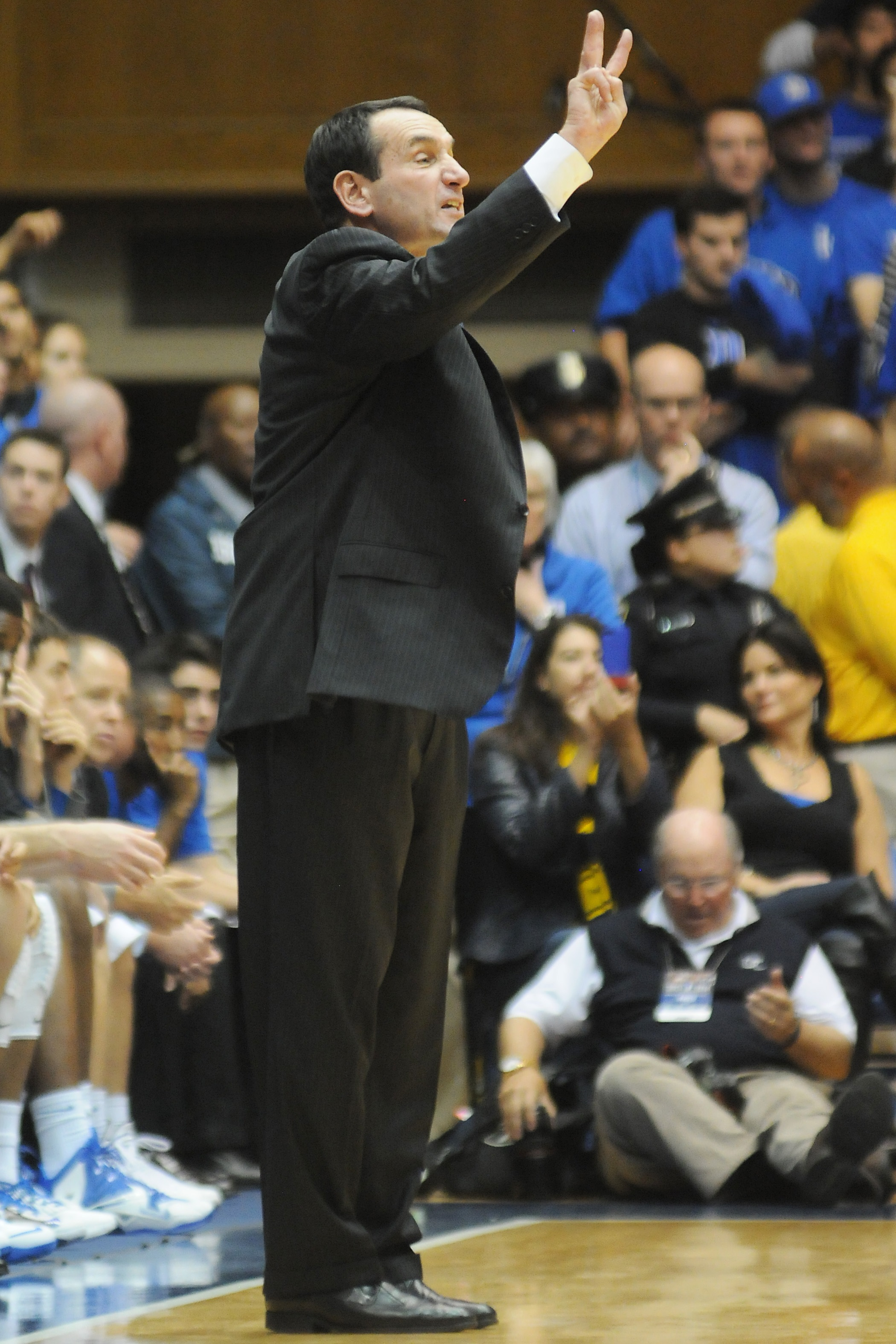
Krzyzewski coaching during a 2013 game

On January 25, 2015, Krzyzewski won his 1,000th game, when Duke defeated St. John's in Madison Square Garden. He is the first men's coach to win 1,000 NCAA Division I basketball games.

On April 6, 2015, Krzyzewski won his fifth NCAA championship, when Duke defeated Wisconsin in the title game.

Winning against Yale in the 2016 NCAA tournament on March 19, Krzyzewski became the all-time winningest coach in the NCAA Division I tournament with 90 total wins.

On November 11, 2017, Krzyzewski won his 1,000th game with the Duke Blue Devils, making him the first head coach to win 1,000 games with one NCAA Division I men's basketball program. (Note: While Jim Boeheim achieved the mark in terms of actual games with Syracuse University on February 4, 2017, Syracuse and Boeheim under NCAA sanctions in 2015 were permanently vacated 101 wins, resulting in Kryzewski statistically becoming the first ever.)

On March 17, 2018, Krzyzewski won his 1,099th game in his career, passing Pat Summitt for most wins by a Division I coach, male or female.

On February 16, 2019, Krzyzewski won his 1,123rd game to become the winningest coach in college basketball history at any level (men's or women's), passing Harry Statham of Division II McKendree University. However, on January 21, 2024, Tara VanDerveer became the winningest head coach in college basketball history at any level, men's or women's, upon passing Krzyzewski with her 1,203rd win.

On June 2, 2021, Krzyzewski announced that he would retire at the conclusion of the 2021–22 season. Krzyzewski coached his final home game on March 5, 2022, against rival North Carolina, where Duke lost 94–81. Krzyzewski reached his 13th Final Four appearance, passing John Wooden for the most Final Four appearances as a coach, where Duke lost 81–77 to North Carolina in his final game on April 2, 2022. He ended his career at Duke with a 1,129–309 win-loss record.

On April 5, 2022, former Duke player Jay Williams theorized that Krzyzewski could return for another season, but Krzyzewski quickly put that theory to rest when he said he was not going to "pull a Tom Brady" on ESPNU Radio.

=== National team ===
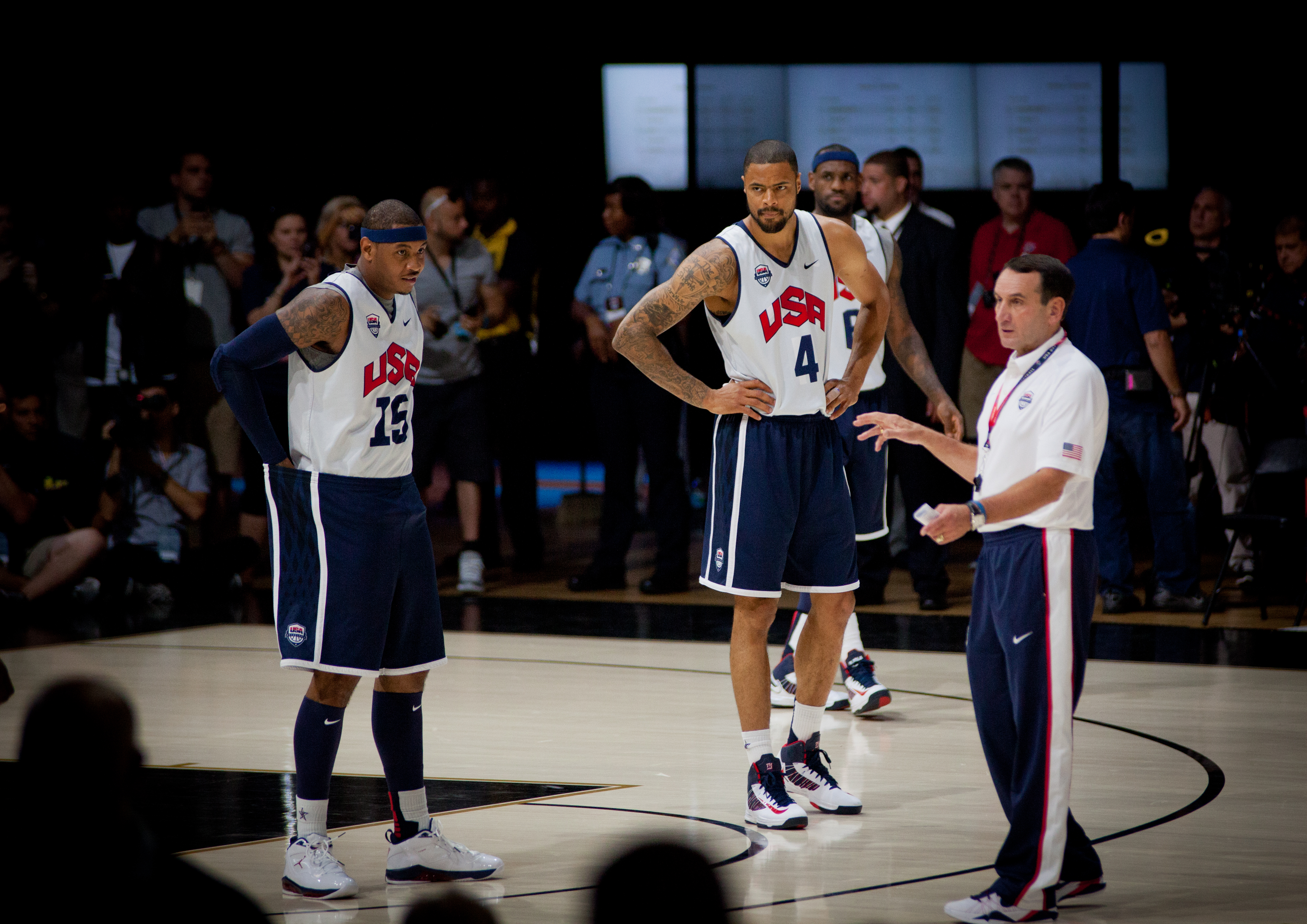
Carmelo Anthony, Tyson Chandler, and Krzyzewski during a national team practice ahead of the 2012 Olympics

Krzyzewski's teams won three consecutive gold medals in the Olympics with him as head coach of the USA men's national team. His other international coaching accolades include a silver medal at the 1987 World University Games, a bronze medal at the 1990 FIBA World Championship, a silver medal at the 1990 Goodwill Games, a bronze medal at the 2006 FIBA World Championship, and gold medals at the 2007 FIBA Americas Championship, the 2010 FIBA World Championship, and the 2014 FIBA World Cup.

He was also an assistant coach for USA teams that won gold medals at the 1984 and 1992 Olympics, 1979 Pan American Games, and 1992 Tournament of the Americas.

In 2005, he was appointed coach of the national team through the 2008 Olympics. In the 2006 FIBA World Championship, the USA won the bronze medal after losing in the semifinals to Greece, then beating defending Olympic gold medalist Argentina for third place.

On August 24, 2008, Krzyzewski's U.S. team won the gold medal at the 2008 Beijing Olympics. "The Redeem Team" finished the tournament with a perfect 8–0 record. He coached the U.S. team for the 2010 FIBA World Championship and led Team USA to a perfect 9–0 record, defeating host Turkey in the gold medal game, 81–64. His team won a second Olympic gold in London, defeating runners-up Spain, 107–100. Krzyzewski has amassed a total record of 75–1 (.987) as head coach of the USA National Team.

In February 2013, Krzyzewski stepped down after seven years of coaching the national team, but Team USA in May announced that he would return as head coach from 2013 through 2016.

=== NBA coaching offers ===
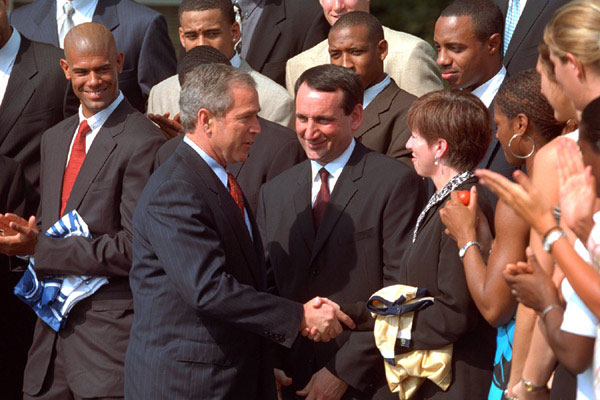
President George W. Bush congratulating Mike Krzyzewski and the 2001 NCAA champions at the White House

During his long tenure at Duke, Krzyzewski had been given the opportunity to coach in the NBA at least five times. The first time came after the 1990 season when he led the Blue Devils to their third straight Final Four appearance. The Boston Celtics offered a coaching position to Krzyzewski, but he soon declined their offer. The next season, Krzyzewski proceeded to lead the Blue Devils to the first of two straight national championships. In 1994, he was pursued by the Portland Trail Blazers, but again he chose to stay with Duke. In 2004, Krzyzewski was also interviewed by the Los Angeles Lakers following the departure of high-profile coach Phil Jackson. He was given a formal offer from Lakers general manager Mitch Kupchak, reportedly for five years, $40 million and part ownership, but again turned down the NBA. In 2010, the New Jersey Nets were reportedly willing to pay Krzyzewski between $12 million and $15 million per season to coach the Nets. Krzyzewski again declined the offer and stayed at Duke. In 2011, Krzyzewski was offered the vacant coaching position for the Minnesota Timberwolves, but he again declined the offer and chose to stay at Duke.

== Post-retirement ==
Although Krzyzewski retired as Duke's basketball coach in 2022, he maintained a position at Duke University and continued to use his office in the Schwartz-Butters Athletic Center. As of 2023, he said he talked to successor coach Jon Scheyer on a near-daily basis. According to The Athletic, Krzyzewski's post-retirement focuses included charity work for The V Foundation and the Emily Krzyzewski Center, speaking gigs, and time with family. He made his first post-retirement appearance at a Duke game on February 14, 2023.

== Awards and honors ==
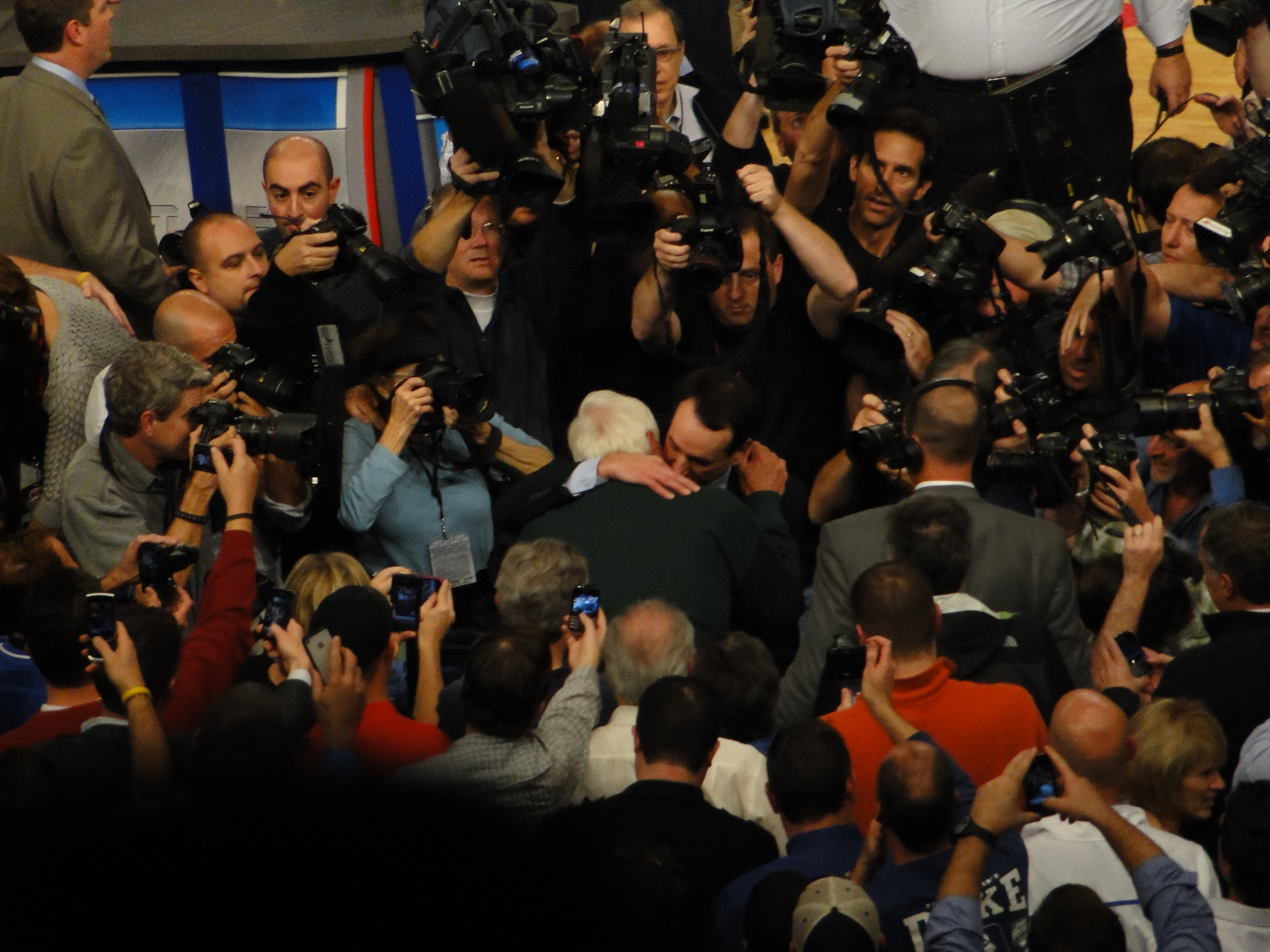
Krzyzewski embraces Bob Knight after his 903rd win

NCAA

- Five-time NCAA Champion – 1991, 1992, 2001, 2010, 2015
- Three-time Naismith College Coach of the Year – 1989, 1992, 1999
- 13-time ACC Regular Season Champion – 1986, 1991, 1992, 1994, 1997, 1998, 1999, 2000, 2001, 2004, 2006, 2010, 2022
- 15-time ACC Tournament Champion – 1986, 1988, 1992, 1999, 2000, 2001, 2002, 2003, 2005, 2006, 2009, 2010, 2011, 2017, 2019
- Five-time ACC Coach of the Year – 1984, 1986, 1997, 1999, 2000
- Two-time United States Sports Academy Amos Alonzo Stagg Coaching Award winner – 1991, 2008.
- Basketball court at Cameron Indoor Stadium named "Coach K Court"

USA Basketball

- Five-time coach of Olympic gold medal-winning team:
  - 1984, 1992 (assistant coach)
  - 2008, 2012, 2016 (head coach)
- Two-time FIBA World Cup Gold Medal winner – 2010, 2014
- Two-time FIBA World Cup Bronze Medal winner – 1990, 2006

Halls of Fame

- Three-time Naismith Memorial Basketball Hall of Fame inductee:
  - 2001 (individual career)
  - 2010 (with the "Dream Team")
  - 2025 (with the "Redeem Team")
- College Basketball Hall of Fame inductee (class of 2006)
- United States Olympic Hall of Fame inductee (class of 2009 – with the "Dream Team")
- FIBA Hall of Fame inductee (class of 2017 – with the "Dream Team")
- United States Military Academy Sports Hall of Fame inductee (class of 2009)
- National Polish American Sports Hall of Fame inductee (class of 1991)

Media

- 1992: The Sporting News Sportsman of the Year
- 2001: Time/CNN America's Best Coach Award
- 2011: Sports Illustrated "Sportsman of the Year"

Other

- 2013: Chicago History Museum Making History Award
- Award presented at the United States Military Academy named the "Coach Krzyzewski Teaching Character Through Sports Award"
- Inducted as a Laureate of The Lincoln Academy of Illinois and awarded the Order of Lincoln (the State's highest honor) by the Governor of Illinois in 2014 in the area of sports.
- Received the Golden Plate Award of the American Academy of Achievement in 1995.
- 2023: North Carolina State Board of Transportation voted to name three miles of North Carolina Highway 751 "Coach K Highway".

== Family and charity ==
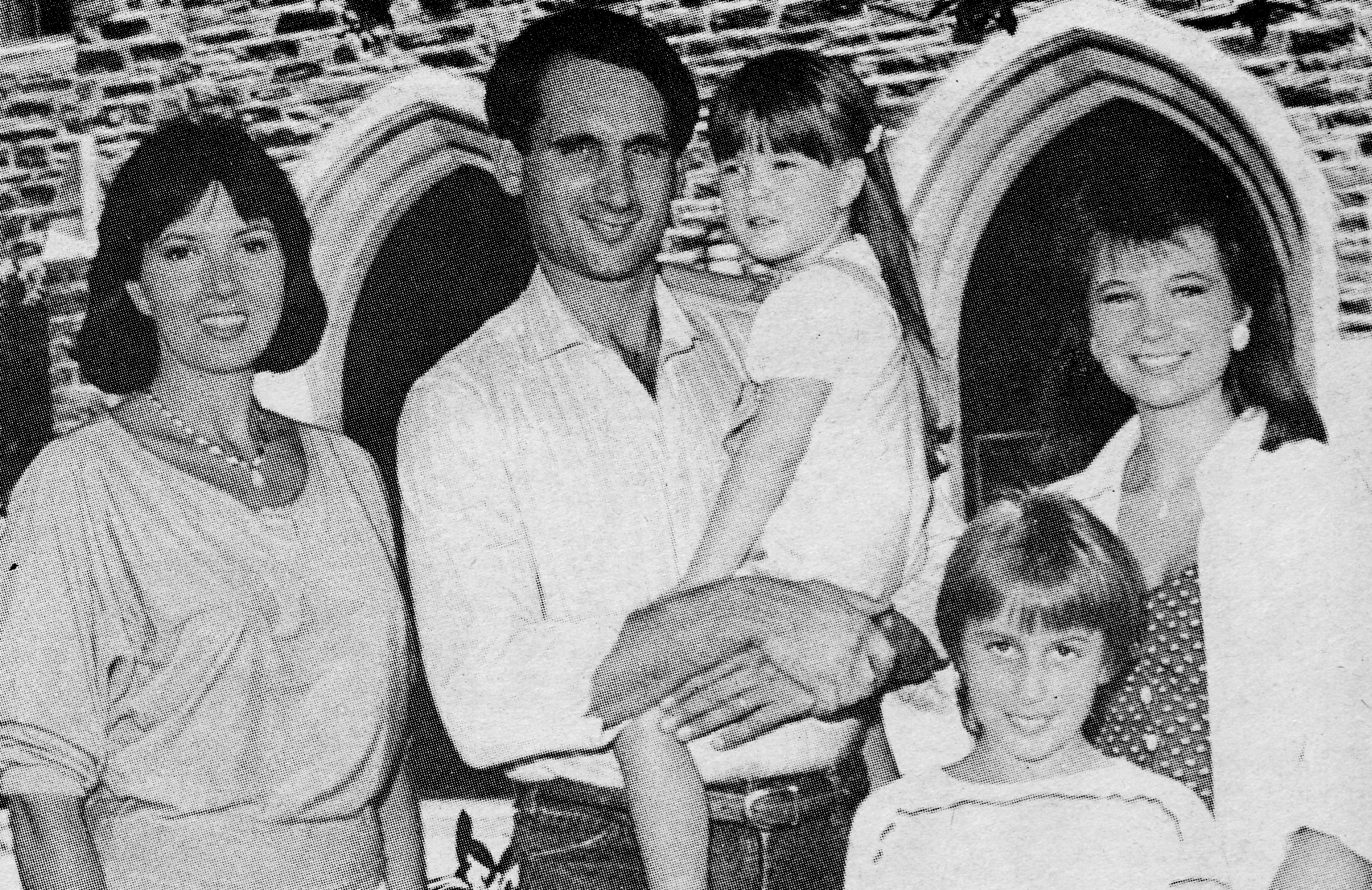
Mickie, Mike, Jamie, Lindy, and Debbie Krzyzewski, circa 1986

Krzyzewski married his wife, Carol "Mickie" Marsh, in the Catholic chapel at West Point on the day of his graduation in 1969. They have three daughters and ten grandchildren. According to The Wall Street Journal, she was the only person who could persuade him to step down during the 1994–95 season when he was suffering from a ruptured disk. She actually went as far as to give her husband an ultimatum–if he wanted to come home on what would prove to be his final day of coaching that season, he needed to skip practice and go to the doctor. His grandson, Michael Savarino, was a walk-on player at Duke for the 2019–20 season.

Krzyzewski and his family founded the Emily Krzyzewski Center, a non-profit organization affiliated with Immaculate Conception Catholic Church in Durham, which was established in 2006 and named in honor of Krzyzewski's mother. The mission is to inspire students from kindergarten to high school to dream big, act with character and purpose, and reach their potential as leaders in their community. The center's K to College Model serves academically focused students in out-of-school programming designed to help them achieve in school, gain entry to college, and break the cycle of poverty in their families. Krzyzewski and his wife, Mickie, have also been active for years in fundraising and support for the Duke Children's Hospital, Children's Miracle Network, the V Foundation for Cancer Research. In all of those entities they have both served as chairs and/or led major fundraising efforts. In addition, the Krzyzewskis have been major donors to Duke University in supporting a number of areas, including establishing scholarship endowments for students in North and South Carolina as well as a Duke student-athlete every year. He also serves on the board of advisors of the Code of Support Foundation, a nonprofit military services organization.

In 2012, Krzyzewski received the U.S. Basketball Writers Association's Wayman Tisdale Humanitarian Award honoring his civic service and charitable efforts in making a significant positive impact on society.

== Head coaching record ==
=== College ===
Record table
Season	Team	Overall	Conference	Standing	Postseason
Army Cadets (NCAA Division I independent) (1975–1980)
1975–76	Army	11–14			
1976–77	Army	20–8			
1977–78	Army	19–9			NIT first round
1978–79	Army	14–11			
1979–80	Army	9–17			
Army:		73–59 (.553)			
Duke Blue Devils (Atlantic Coast Conference) (1980–2022)
1980–81	Duke	17–13	6–8	T–5th	NIT quarterfinal
1981–82	Duke	10–17	4–10	T–6th	
1982–83	Duke	11–17	3–11	7th	
1983–84	Duke	24–10	7–7	T–3rd	NCAA Division I Round of 32
1984–85	Duke	23–8	8–6	T–4th	NCAA Division I Round of 32
1985–86	Duke	37–3	12–2	1st	NCAA Division I Runner-up
1986–87	Duke	24–9	9–5	3rd	NCAA Division I Sweet 16
1987–88	Duke	28–7	9–5	3rd	NCAA Division I Final Four
1988–89	Duke	28–8	9–5	T–2nd	NCAA Division I Final Four
1989–90	Duke	29–9	9–5	2nd	NCAA Division I Runner-up
1990–91	Duke	32–7	11–3	1st	NCAA Division I Champion
1991–92	Duke	34–2	14–2	1st	NCAA Division I Champion
1992–93	Duke	24–8	10–6	T–3rd	NCAA Division I Round of 32
1993–94	Duke	28–6	12–4	1st	NCAA Division I Runner-up
1994–95	Duke	9–3 (Note: Krzyzewski coached only the first 12 games of season before leaving the team for back surgery and to recover from exhaustion. Pete Gaudet took over as interim head coach and compiled a record of 4–15 with a mark of 2–13 in conference play. Duke finished the season with a record of 13–18 overall and in ninth place in the ACC at 2–14. Duke and the NCAA credit the first 12 games of the season to Krzyzewski and the final 19 games to Gaudet.)	0–1		
1995–96	Duke	18–13	8–8	T–4th	NCAA Division I Round of 64
1996–97	Duke	24–9	12–4	1st	NCAA Division I Round of 32
1997–98	Duke	32–4	15–1	1st	NCAA Division I Elite Eight
1998–99	Duke	37–2	16–0	1st	NCAA Division I Runner-up
1999–00	Duke	29–5	15–1	1st	NCAA Division I Sweet 16
2000–01	Duke	35–4	13–3	T–1st	NCAA Division I Champion
2001–02	Duke	31–4	13–3	2nd	NCAA Division I Sweet 16
2002–03	Duke	26–7	11–5	T–2nd	NCAA Division I Sweet 16
2003–04	Duke	31–6	13–3	1st	NCAA Division I Final Four
2004–05	Duke	27–6	11–5	3rd	NCAA Division I Sweet 16
2005–06	Duke	32–4	14–2	1st	NCAA Division I Sweet 16
2006–07	Duke	22–11	8–8	6th	NCAA Division I Round of 64
2007–08	Duke	28–6	13–3	2nd	NCAA Division I Round of 32
2008–09	Duke	30–7	11–5	T–2nd	NCAA Division I Sweet 16
2009–10	Duke	35–5	13–3	T–1st	NCAA Division I Champion
2010–11	Duke	32–5	13–3	2nd	NCAA Division I Sweet 16
2011–12	Duke	27–7	13–3	2nd	NCAA Division I Round of 64
2012–13	Duke	30–6	14–4	2nd	NCAA Division I Elite Eight
2013–14	Duke	26–9	13–5	T–3rd	NCAA Division I Round of 64
2014–15	Duke	35–4	15–3	2nd	NCAA Division I Champion
2015–16	Duke	25–11	11–7	T–5th	NCAA Division I Sweet 16
2016–17	Duke	28–9	11–7	T–5th	NCAA Division I Round of 32
2017–18	Duke	29–8	13–5	2nd	NCAA Division I Elite Eight
2018–19	Duke	32–6	14–4	3rd	NCAA Division I Elite Eight
2019–20	Duke	25–6	15–5	T–2nd	No postseason held
2020–21	Duke	13–11	9–9	10th	
2021–22	Duke	32–7	16–4	1st	NCAA Division I Final Four
Duke:		1,129–309 (.785)	466–193 (.707)		
Total:		1,202–368 (.766)			
National champion Postseason invitational champion Conference regular season champion Conference regular season and conference tournament champion Division regular season champion Division regular season and conference tournament champion Conference tournament champion

*The 2020 NCAA tournament was canceled due to concerns over the coronavirus pandemic.

== Coaching tree ==
Assistant coaches under Krzyzewski who became NCAA or NBA head coaches

- Pete Gaudet – Army (1980–82)
- Chuck Swenson – William & Mary (1987–1994)
- Bob Bender – Illinois State (1989–1993), Washington (1993–2002)
- Mike Brey – Delaware (1995–2000), Notre Dame (2000–2023)
- Tommy Amaker – Seton Hall (1997–2001), Michigan (2001–2007), Harvard (2007–present)
- Tim O'Toole – Fairfield (1998–2006)
- Quin Snyder – Missouri (1999–2006), Austin Toros (2007–2010), Utah Jazz (2014–2022), Atlanta Hawks (2023–present)
- David Henderson – Delaware (2000–2006)
- Jeff Capel – VCU (2002–2006), Oklahoma (2006–2011), Pittsburgh (2018–present)
- Johnny Dawkins – Stanford (2008–2016), UCF (2016–present)
- Chris Collins – Northwestern (2013–present)
- Bobby Hurley – Buffalo (2013–2015), Arizona State (2015–2026)
- Steve Wojciechowski – Marquette (2014–2021)
- Nate James – Austin Peay (2021–2023)
- Jon Scheyer – Duke (2022–present)
- Nolan Smith – Tennessee State (2025–present)

== See also ==
- Coach K College Basketball, a 1995 video game
- FIBA Basketball World Cup winning head coaches
- List of college men's basketball career coaching wins leaders
- List of FIBA AmeriCup winning head coaches
- List of NCAA Division I men's basketball tournament Final Four appearances by coach
- NCAA Division I men's basketball tournament consecutive appearances
- Poles in Chicago

== Notes ==
Sporting positions
Preceded by Pepu Hernández	FIBA World Cup; Winning Coach; 2010–2014	Succeeded by Sergio Scariolo
