= 1986 ACC men's basketball tournament =

- Classification: Division I
- Season: 1985–86
- Teams: 8
- Site: Greensboro Coliseum; Greensboro, North Carolina
- Champions: Duke (7th title)
- Winning coach: Mike Krzyzewski (1st title)
- MVP: Johnny Dawkins (Duke)
- Television: Raycom/Jefferson Pilot, NBC

1985–86 ACC men's basketball standings
	Conf.				Overall
Team	W		L	PCT	W		L	PCT
No. 1 Duke†	12	–	2	.857	37	–	3	.925
No. 6 Georgia Tech	11	–	3	.786	27	–	7	.794
No. 8 North Carolina	10	–	4	.714	28	–	6	.824
NC State	7	–	7	.500	21	–	13	.618
Virginia	7	–	7	.500	19	–	11	.633
Maryland	6	–	8	.429	19	–	14	.576
Clemson	3	–	11	.214	19	–	15	.559
Wake Forest	0	–	14	.000	8	–	21	.276
† 1986 ACC tournament winner Rankings from AP Poll

The 1986 Atlantic Coast Conference men's basketball tournament took place in Greensboro, North Carolina, at the Greensboro Coliseum from March 7 to 9. Duke won the championship, defeating Georgia Tech, 68–67. Johnny Dawkins of Duke was named the tournament MVP.

== Bracket ==
Quarterfinals; March 7
1	#1 Duke	68
8	Wake Forest	60
4	#20 NC State	62
5	Virginia	64
2	#6 Georgia Tech	79
7	Clemson	61
3	#4 North Carolina	75
6	Maryland	85

Semifinals; March 8
1	#1 Duke	75
5	Virginia	70
2	#6 Georgia Tech	64
6	Maryland	62

Championship Game; March 9
1	#1 Duke	68
2	#6 Georgia Tech	67
