= 1986 NCAA Division I men's basketball tournament =

Edition of USA college basketball tournament

- Season: 1985–86
- Teams: 64
- Finals site: Reunion Arena, Dallas, Texas
- Champions: Louisville Cardinals (2nd title, 2nd title game, 7th Final Four)
- Runner-up: Duke Blue Devils (3rd title game, 5th Final Four)
- Semifinalists: Kansas Jayhawks (7th Final Four); LSU Tigers (3rd Final Four)
- Winning coach: Denny Crum (2nd title)
- MOP: Pervis Ellison (Louisville)
- Attendance: 499,704
- Top scorer: Johnny Dawkins (Duke) (153 points)

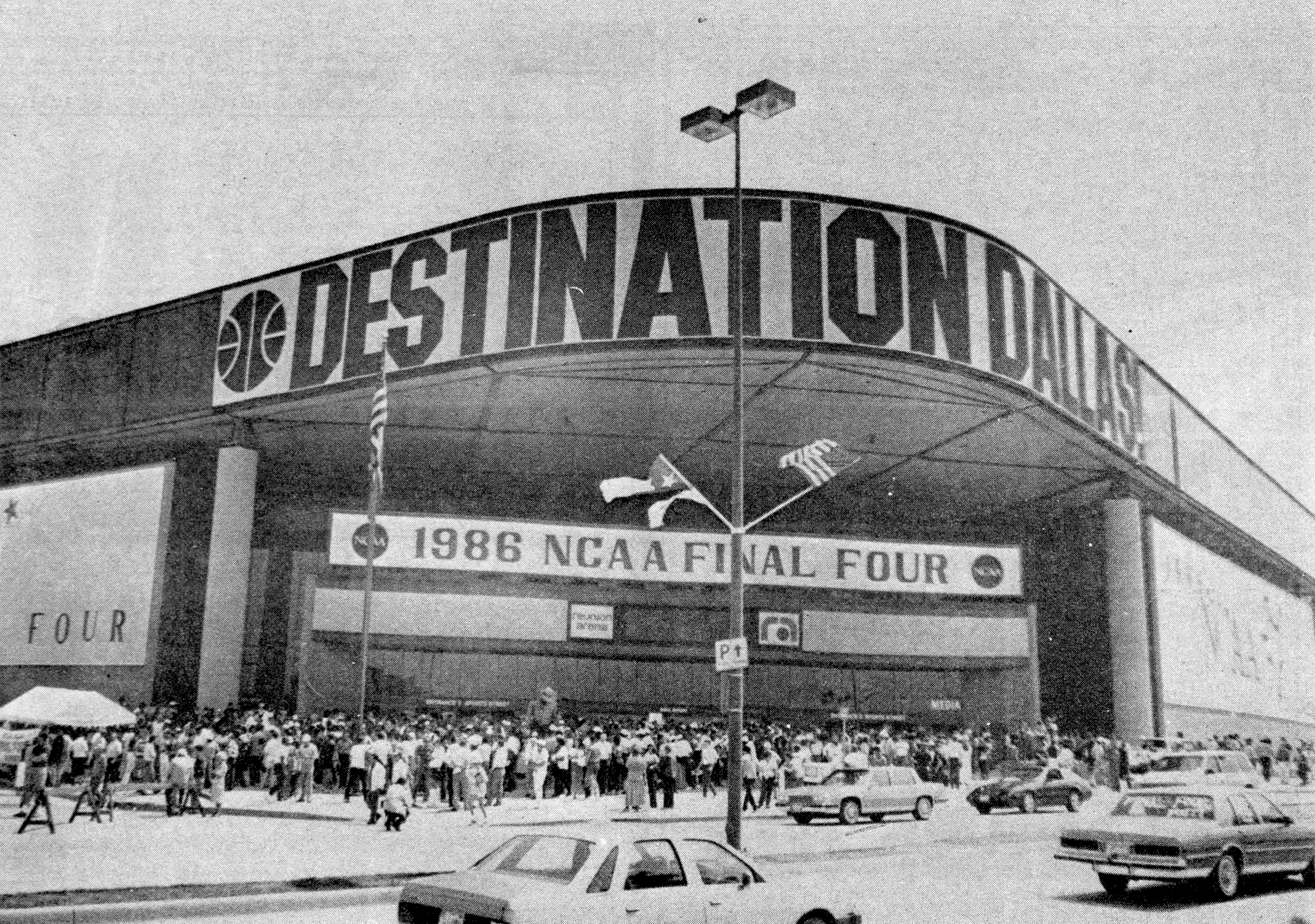
Reunion Arena in Dallas hosted the semi-finals and championship game.

The 1986 NCAA Division I men's basketball tournament involved 64 schools playing in single-elimination play to determine the national champion of men's NCAA Division I college basketball. The 48th annual edition of the tournament began on March 13, 1986, and ended with the championship game on March 31, at Reunion Arena in Dallas, Texas. A total of 63 games were played.

Louisville, coached by Denny Crum, won the national title with a 72–69 victory in the final game over Duke, coached by Mike Krzyzewski. Pervis Ellison of Louisville was named the tournament's Most Outstanding Player. Louisville became the first team from outside a power conference to win the championship since the expansion to 64 teams, and remains one of only two teams to do so (the other team was UNLV in 1990).

The 1986 NCAA Men's Basketball Championship Tournament was the first tournament to use a shot clock limiting the amount of time for any one offensive possession by a team prior to taking a shot at the basket. Beginning with the 1986 tournament, the shot clock was set at 45 seconds, which it would remain until being shortened to 35 seconds beginning in the 1994 NCAA Division I men's basketball tournament, and further shortened to 30 seconds (the same as NCAA women's basketball) starting with the 2016 NCAA Division I men's basketball tournament.

The 1986 tournament was also the last to not feature the three-point shot, and the first where a custom floor was installed for the Final Four.

LSU's 1985–86 team is tied for the lowest-seeded team (#11) to ever make the Final Four with the 2005–06 George Mason Patriots, the 2010–11 VCU Rams, the 2017–18 Loyola-Chicago Ramblers, the 2020–21 UCLA Bruins, and the 2023-24 NC State Wolfpack. As of 2018, they are the only team in tournament history to beat the top 3 seeds from their region. LSU began its run to the Final Four by winning two games on its home court, the LSU Assembly Center, leading to a change two years later which prohibited teams from playing NCAA tournament games on a court which they have played four or more games in the regular season. Cleveland State University became the first #14 seed to reach the Sweet Sixteen, losing to their fellow underdog, Navy, by a single point. This was also the first year in which two #14 seeds reached the second round in the same year, as Arkansas-Little Rock beat #3-seed Notre Dame; however, they lost their second-round game in double overtime. Both feats have only occurred one other time. Chattanooga reached the Sweet Sixteen as a 14-seed in 1997, and Old Dominion and Weber State both reached the second round as 14-seeds in 1995.

Every regional final featured a #1 or #2 seed playing a team seeded #6 or lower. The lone #1 seed to not reach the Elite Eight, St. John's (West), was knocked out in the second round by #8 Auburn, which lost to #2 Louisville in the regional final.

It could be argued that these upsets by the 14-seeds had launched the NCAA tournament's reputation for having unknown teams defeat well-known basketball powers, and both happened on the same day. Indiana's loss to Cleveland State would be part of the climax in the best-selling book A Season On The Brink.

Another story of the tournament was when Navy reached the Elite 8 thanks to stunning performances by David Robinson. This tournament had no Pac 10 teams advance beyond the round of 64. This did not occur again until 2018.

== Schedule and venues ==
1986 first and second rounds
1986 Regionals (blue) and Final Four (red)

The following are the sites that were selected to host each round of the 1986 tournament:

First and Second Rounds

- March 13 and 15
  - East Region
    - Greensboro Coliseum, Greensboro, North Carolina (Host: Atlantic Coast Conference)
  - Midwest Region
    - University of Dayton Arena, Dayton, Ohio (Host: University of Dayton)
  - Southeast Region
    - LSU Assembly Center, Baton Rouge, Louisiana (Host: Louisiana State University)
  - West Region
    - Dee Events Center, Ogden, Utah (Host: Weber State University)
- March 14 and 16
  - East Region
    - Carrier Dome, Syracuse, New York (Host: Syracuse University)
  - Midwest Region
    - Hubert H. Humphrey Metrodome, Minneapolis, Minnesota (Host: University of Minnesota)
  - Southeast Region
    - Charlotte Coliseum, Charlotte, North Carolina (Host: University of North Carolina at Charlotte)
  - West Region
    - Long Beach Arena, Long Beach, California (Host: Long Beach State University)

Regional semifinals and finals (Sweet Sixteen and Elite Eight)

- March 20 and 22
  - Southeast Regional, Omni Coliseum, Atlanta, Georgia (Host: Georgia Tech)
  - West Regional, The Summit, Houston, Texas (Hosts: University of Houston, Rice University)
- March 21 and 23
  - East Regional, Brendan Byrne Arena, East Rutherford, New Jersey (Hosts: Seton Hall University, Big East Conference)
  - Midwest Regional, Kemper Arena, Kansas City, Missouri (Host: Big 8 Conference)

National semifinals and championship (Final Four and championship)

- March 29 and 31
  - Reunion Arena, Dallas, Texas (Host: Southwest Conference)

== Teams ==
Region	Seed	Team	Coach	Conference	Finished	Final opponent	Score
West
West	1	St. John's	Lou Carnesecca	Big East	Round of 32	8 Auburn	L 81–65
West	2	Louisville	Denny Crum	Metro	Champion	1 Duke	W 72–69
West	3	North Carolina	Dean Smith	Atlantic Coast	Sweet Sixteen	2 Louisville	L 94–79
West	4	UNLV	Jerry Tarkanian	Pacific Coast	Sweet Sixteen	8 Auburn	L 70–63
West	5	Maryland	Lefty Driesell	Atlantic Coast	Round of 32	4 UNLV	L 70–64
West	6	UAB	Gene Bartow	Sun Belt	Round of 32	3 North Carolina	L 77–59
West	7	Bradley	Dick Versace	Missouri Valley	Round of 32	2 Louisville	L 82–68
West	8	Auburn	Sonny Smith	Southeastern	Regional Runner-up	2 Louisville	L 84–76
West	9	Arizona	Lute Olson	Pacific-10	Round of 64	8 Auburn	L 73–63
West	10	UTEP	Don Haskins	Western Athletic	Round of 64	7 Bradley	L 83–65
West	11	Missouri	Norm Stewart	Big Eight	Round of 64	6 UAB	L 66–64
West	12	Pepperdine	Jim Harrick	West Coast	Round of 64	5 Maryland	L 69–64
West	13	Northeast Louisiana	Mike Vining	Southland	Round of 64	4 UNLV	L 74–51
West	14	Utah	Lynn Archibald	Western Athletic	Round of 64	3 North Carolina	L 84–72
West	15	Drexel	Eddie Burke	East Coast	Round of 64	2 Louisville	L 93–73
West	16	Montana State	Stu Starner	Big Sky	Round of 64	1 St. John's	L 83–74
Midwest
Midwest	1	Kansas	Larry Brown	Big Eight	National semifinals	1 Duke	L 71–67
Midwest	2	Michigan	Bill Frieder	Big Ten	Round of 32	7 Iowa State	L 72–69
Midwest	3	Notre Dame	Digger Phelps	Independent	Round of 64	14 Arkansas–Little Rock	L 90–83
Midwest	4	Georgetown	John Thompson	Big East	Round of 32	5 Michigan State	L 80–68
Midwest	5	Michigan State	Jud Heathcote	Big Ten	Sweet Sixteen	1 Kansas	L 96–86
Midwest	6	NC State	Jim Valvano	Atlantic Coast	Regional Runner-up	1 Kansas	L 75–67
Midwest	7	Iowa State	Johnny Orr	Big Eight	Sweet Sixteen	6 NC State	L 70–66
Midwest	8	Jacksonville	Bob Wenzel	Sun Belt	Round of 64	9 Temple	L 61–50
Midwest	9	Temple	John Chaney	Atlantic 10	Round of 32	1 Kansas	L 65–43
Midwest	10	Miami (OH)	Jerry Peirson	Mid-American	Round of 64	7 Iowa State	L 81–79
Midwest	11	Iowa	George Raveling	Big Ten	Round of 64	6 NC State	L 66–64
Midwest	12	Washington	Andy Russo	Pacific-10	Round of 64	5 Michigan State	L 72–70
Midwest	13	Texas Tech	Gerald Myers	Southwest	Round of 64	4 Georgetown	L 70–64
Midwest	14	Arkansas–Little Rock	Mike Newell	Trans America	Round of 32	6 NC State	L 80–66
Midwest	15	Akron	Bob Huggins	Ohio Valley	Round of 64	2 Michigan	L 70–64
Midwest	16	North Carolina A&T	Don Corbett	Mid-Eastern	Round of 64	1 Kansas	L 71–46
Southeast
Southeast	1	Kentucky	Eddie Sutton	Southeastern	Regional Runner-up	11 LSU	L 59–57
Southeast	2	Georgia Tech	Bobby Cremins	Atlantic Coast	Sweet Sixteen	11 LSU	L 70–64
Southeast	3	Memphis State (Vacated)	Dana Kirk	Metro	Round of 32	11 LSU	L 83–81
Southeast	4	Illinois	Lou Henson	Big Ten	Round of 32	5 Alabama	L 58–56
Southeast	5	Alabama	Wimp Sanderson	Southeastern	Sweet Sixteen	1 Kentucky	L 68–63
Southeast	6	Purdue	Gene Keady	Big Ten	Round of 64	11 LSU	L 94–87
Southeast	7	Virginia Tech	Charles Moir	Metro	Round of 64	10 Villanova	L 71–62
Southeast	8	Western Kentucky	Clem Haskins	Sun Belt	Round of 32	1 Kentucky	L 71–64
Southeast	9	Nebraska	Moe Iba	Big Eight	Round of 64	8 Western Kentucky	L 67–59
Southeast	10	Villanova	Rollie Massimino	Big East	Round of 32	2 Georgia Tech	L 66–61
Southeast	11	LSU	Dale Brown	Southeastern	National semifinals	2 Louisville	L 88–77
Southeast	12	Xavier	Pete Gillen	Midwestern	Round of 64	5 Alabama	L 97–80
Southeast	13	Fairfield	Mitch Buonaguro	Metro Atlantic	Round of 64	4 Illinois	L 75–51
Southeast	14	Ball State	Al Brown	Mid-American	Round of 64	3 Memphis State	L 95–63
Southeast	15	Marist	Matt Furjanic	ECAC Metro	Round of 64	2 Georgia Tech	L 68–53
Southeast	16	Davidson	Bobby Hussey	Southern	Round of 64	1 Kentucky	L 75–55
East
East	1	Duke	Mike Krzyzewski	Atlantic Coast	Runner Up	2 Louisville	L 72–69
East	2	Syracuse	Jim Boeheim	Big East	Round of 32	7 Navy	L 97–85
East	3	Indiana	Bob Knight	Big Ten	Round of 64	14 Cleveland State	L 83–79
East	4	Oklahoma	Billy Tubbs	Big Eight	Round of 32	12 DePaul	L 74–69
East	5	Virginia	Terry Holland	Atlantic Coast	Round of 64	12 DePaul	L 72–68
East	6	Saint Joseph's	Jim Boyle	Atlantic 10	Round of 32	14 Cleveland State	L 75–69
East	7	Navy	Paul Evans	Colonial	Regional Runner-up	1 Duke	L 71–50
East	8	Old Dominion	Tom Young	Sun Belt	Round of 32	1 Duke	L 89–61
East	9	West Virginia	Gale Catlett	Atlantic 10	Round of 64	8 Old Dominion	L 72–64
East	10	Tulsa	J. D. Barnett	Missouri Valley	Round of 64	7 Navy	L 87–68
East	11	Richmond	Dick Tarrant	Colonial	Round of 64	6 Saint Joseph's	L 60–59
East	12	DePaul	Joey Meyer	Independent	Sweet Sixteen	1 Duke	L 74–67
East	13	Northeastern	Jim Calhoun	ECAC North	Round of 64	4 Oklahoma	L 80–74
East	14	Cleveland State	Kevin Mackey	Mid-Continent	Sweet Sixteen	7 Navy	L 71–70
East	15	Brown	Mike Cingiser	Ivy League	Round of 64	2 Syracuse	L 101–52
East	16	Mississippi Valley State	Lafayette Stribling	Southwest Athletic	Round of 64	1 Duke	L 85–78

== Bracket ==
=== East Regional – East Rutherford, New Jersey ===
First round
1	Duke	85
16	Mississippi Valley State	78
Greensboro
8	Old Dominion	72
9	West Virginia	64
5	Virginia	68
12	DePaul	72
Greensboro
4	Oklahoma	80
13	Northeastern	74
6	Saint Joseph's	60
11	Richmond	59
Syracuse
3	Indiana	79
14	Cleveland State	83
7	Navy	87
10	Tulsa	68
Syracuse
2	Syracuse	101
15	Brown	52

Quarter-finals
1	Duke	89
8	Old Dominion	61
12	DePaul	74
4	Oklahoma	69
6	Saint Joseph's	69
14	Cleveland State	75
7	Navy	97
2	Syracuse	85

Regional semifinals
1	Duke	74
12	DePaul	67
14	Cleveland State	70
7	Navy	71

Regional Finals
1	Duke	71
7	Navy	50

==== First round summary ====
===== Friday, March 14, 1986 =====
NCAA Productions
ESPN

Friday, March 14
approx. 2:37 PM EST

box score

#14 Cleveland State Vikings 83, #3 Indiana Hoosiers 79

Carrier Dome – Syracuse, New York
Attendance: 16,857
Referees: Tom Fraim, Bruce Shapiro, Jody Sylvester

==== Second round summary ====
===== Sunday, March 16, 1986 =====
CBS

Sunday, March 16
approx. 2:50 PM EST

box score

#14 Cleveland State Vikings 75, #6 St. Joseph's Hawks 69

Carrier Dome – Syracuse, New York
Attendance: 21,713
Referees: Gerry Donaghy, Tom Fraim, Sid Rodeheffer

==== Regional Semi-final summary ====
CBS

Friday, March 21
7:41 PM EST

box score

#7 Navy Midshipmen 71, #14 Cleveland State Vikings 70

Brendan Byrne Arena – East Rutherford, New Jersey
Attendance: 19,454
Referees: Joe Forte, Paul Housman, Rich Wulkow

=== Midwest Regional – Kansas City, Missouri ===
First round
1	Kansas	71
16	North Carolina A&T	46
Dayton
8	Jacksonville	50
9	Temple	61^{OT}
5	Michigan State	72
12	Washington	70
Dayton
4	Georgetown	70
13	Texas Tech	64
6	NC State	66
11	Iowa	64
Minneapolis
3	Notre Dame	83
14	Arkansas–Little Rock	90
7	Iowa State	81^{OT}
10	Miami (OH)	79
Minneapolis
2	Michigan	70
15	Akron	64

Quarter-finals
1	Kansas	65
9	Temple	43
5	Michigan State	80
4	Georgetown	68
6	NC State	80^{OT}
14	Arkansas–Little Rock	66
7	Iowa State	72
2	Michigan	69

Regional semifinals
1	Kansas	96^{OT}
5	Michigan State	86
6	NC State	70
7	Iowa State	66

Regional Finals
1	Kansas	75
6	NC State	67

=== Southeast Regional – Atlanta, Georgia ===
First round
1	Kentucky	75
16	Davidson	55
Charlotte
8	Western Kentucky	67
9	Nebraska	59
5	Alabama	97
12	Xavier	80
Charlotte
4	Illinois	75
13	Fairfield	51
6	Purdue	87
11	LSU	94^{2OT}
Baton Rouge
3	~~Memphis State~~	95
14	Ball State	63
7	Virginia Tech	62
10	Villanova	71
Baton Rouge
2	Georgia Tech	68
15	Marist	53

Quarter-finals
1	Kentucky	71
8	Western Kentucky	64
5	Alabama	58
4	Illinois	56
11	LSU	83
3	~~Memphis State~~	81
10	Villanova	61
2	Georgia Tech	66

Regional semifinals
1	Kentucky	68
5	Alabama	63
11	LSU	70
2	Georgia Tech	64

Regional Finals
1	Kentucky	57
11	LSU	59

Memphis State was forced to vacate its NCAA tournament appearance after a massive gambling scandal and a criminal investigation into head coach Dana Kirk. Unlike forfeiture, a vacated game does not result in the other school being credited with a win, only with Memphis removing the wins from its own record.

=== West Regional – Houston, Texas ===
First round
1	St. John's	83
16	Montana State	74
Long Beach
8	Auburn	73
9	Arizona	63
5	Maryland	69
12	Pepperdine	64
Long Beach
4	UNLV	74
13	Northeast Louisiana	51
6	UAB	66
11	Missouri	64
Ogden
3	North Carolina	84
14	Utah	72
7	Bradley	83
10	UTEP	65
Ogden
2	Louisville	93
15	Drexel	73

Quarter-finals
1	St. John's	65
8	Auburn	81
5	Maryland	64
4	UNLV	70
6	UAB	59
3	North Carolina	77
7	Bradley	68
2	Louisville	82

Regional semifinals
8	Auburn	70
4	UNLV	63
3	North Carolina	79
2	Louisville	94

Regional Finals
8	Auburn	76
2	Louisville	84

=== Final Four – Dallas, Texas ===
National semifinals
E1	Duke	71
MW1	Kansas	67
SE11	LSU	77
W2	Louisville	88

National Championship Game
E1	Duke	69
W2	Louisville	72

== Final Four Officials ==
- Joe Forte (LSU-Louisville)
- Dick Paparo (LSU-Louisville)
- Lenny Wirtz (LSU-Louisville)
- Paul Galvan (Kansas-Duke)
- John Clougherty (Kansas-Duke)
- Tom Fincken (Kansas-Duke)
- Hank Nichols (Louisville-Duke)
- Pete Pavia (Louisville-Duke)
- Don Rutledge (Louisville-Duke)

The 1986 Final Four was the first in which the NCAA assigned a separate three-man crew for the championship game. Previously, three of the six officials from the semifinals were melded into a crew for the championship.

The championship game was the last for future Naismith Memorial Basketball Hall of Fame inductee Hank Nichols, who became the NCAA's national supervisor of officials. The Louisville-Duke matchup was Nichols' sixth championship game assignment.

== Announcers ==
Studio Hosts:

CBS: Brent Musburger (First and Second Rounds), and Jim Nantz (Regional Semifinals to National Championship Game)

ESPN: Bob Ley and Dick Vitale

- Brent Musburger and Billy Packer – West Regional semifinal (Louisville–North Carolina) and Regional Final at Houston, Texas; Midwest Regional Final at Kansas City, Missouri; Final Four at Dallas, Texas
- Gary Bender and Doug Collins – second round at Syracuse, New York and Dayton, Ohio; East Regional at East Rutherford, New Jersey
- Dick Stockton and Larry Conley – Southeast Regional at Atlanta, Georgia
- Verne Lundquist and James Brown – Midwest Regional semifinal (Kansas–Michigan State) at Kansas City, Missouri
- Tom Hammond and James Brown – Midwest Regional semifinal (N.C. State–Iowa State) at Kansas City, Missouri
- Fred White and Gary Thompson – West Regional semifinal (UNLV–Auburn) at Houston, Texas
- Jim Nantz and Bill Raftery – second round at Greensboro, North Carolina
- Mike Patrick and James Brown – second round at Charlotte, North Carolina
- Dick Stockton and Billy Packer – first round (North Carolina–Utah) at Ogden, Utah; Second Round at Baton Rouge, Louisiana and Minneapolis, Minnesota
- Tim Ryan and Lynn Shackleford – second round at Ogden, Utah
- Verne Lundquist and Larry Conley – first round (Auburn–Arizona) and Second Round (St. John's–Auburn) at Long Beach, California
- Mike Walden and Larry Conley – first round (Maryland–Pepperdine) and Second Round (UNLV–Maryland) at Long Beach, California
- Bob Rathbun and Bucky Waters – first round (Oklahoma–Northeastern) at Greensboro, North Carolina
- Ralph Hacker and Dan Bonner – first round (Indiana–Cleveland State, Navy–Tulsa) at Syracuse, New York
- Mike Patrick and Irv Brown – first round (Illinois–Fairfield, Kentucky–Davidson) at Charlotte, North Carolina
- Jim Thacker and Dave Gavitt – first round (Western Kentucky–Nebraska) at Charlotte, North Carolina
- Tom Hammond and Billy Cunningham – first round (Georgetown–Texas Tech) at Dayton, Ohio
- Frank Herzog and Gary Thompson – first round (N.C. State–Iowa) at Minneapolis, Minnesota
- Frank Fallon and Bob Ortegel – first round (Bradley–UTEP) at Ogden, Utah
- Bob Carpenter and Joe Dean – first round (LSU-Purdue) at Baton Rouge, Louisiana

== See also ==
- 1986 NCAA Division II men's basketball tournament
- 1986 NCAA Division III men's basketball tournament
- 1986 NCAA Division I women's basketball tournament
- 1986 NCAA Division II women's basketball tournament
- 1986 NCAA Division III women's basketball tournament
- 1986 National Invitation Tournament
- 1986 National Women's Invitation Tournament
- 1986 NAIA men's basketball tournament
- 1986 NAIA Division I women's basketball tournament
