= Johnny Dawkins =

American basketball player and coach (born 1963)

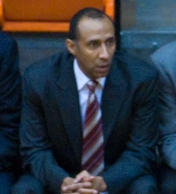
- Dawkins in 2010

UCF Knights
- Title: Head coach
- League: Big 12 Conference

Personal information
- Born: September 28, 1963 (age 63) Washington, D.C., U.S.
- Listed height: 6 ft 2 in (1.88 m)
- Listed weight: 165 lb (75 kg)

Career information
- High school: Mackin Catholic (Washington, D.C.)
- College: Duke (1982–1986)
- NBA draft: 1986: 1st round, 10th overall pick
- Drafted by: San Antonio Spurs
- Playing career: 1986–1995
- Position: Point guard
- Number: 24, 12
- Coaching career: 1998–present

Career history

Playing
- 1986–1989: San Antonio Spurs
- 1989–1994: Philadelphia 76ers
- 1994–1995: Detroit Pistons

Coaching
- 1998–1999: Duke (assistant)
- 1999–2008: Duke (associate HC)
- 2008–2016: Stanford
- 2016–present: UCF

Career highlights
- As player: Naismith Player of the Year (1986); 2× Consensus first-team All-American (1985, 1986); 2× First-team All-ACC (1985, 1986); 2× Second-team All-ACC (1983, 1984); ACC tournament MVP (1986); No. 24 retired by Duke Blue Devils; McDonald's All-American (1982); Third-team Parade All-American (1982); As coach: 2× NIT champion (2012, 2015); Jim Phelan Award (2026)

Career statistics
- Points: 5,984 (11.1 ppg)
- Rebounds: 1,336 (2.5 rpg)
- Assists: 2,997 (5.5 apg)
- Stats at NBA.com
- Stats at Basketball Reference
- Collegiate Basketball Hall of Fame

Johnny Earl Dawkins Jr. (born September 28, 1963) is an American basketball coach and former player who is the head coach for the UCF men's basketball team. From 2008 to 2016, he was the head coach of Stanford. He was a two-time All-American and national player of the year as a senior in 1986 while at Duke from 1982 to 1986. Dawkins subsequently played nine seasons in the National Basketball Association (NBA) with the San Antonio Spurs (1986–1989), Philadelphia 76ers (1989–1994), and Detroit Pistons (1994–1995). From 1998 to 2008, he served as an assistant basketball coach at his alma mater, Duke.

== Playing career ==
=== College ===
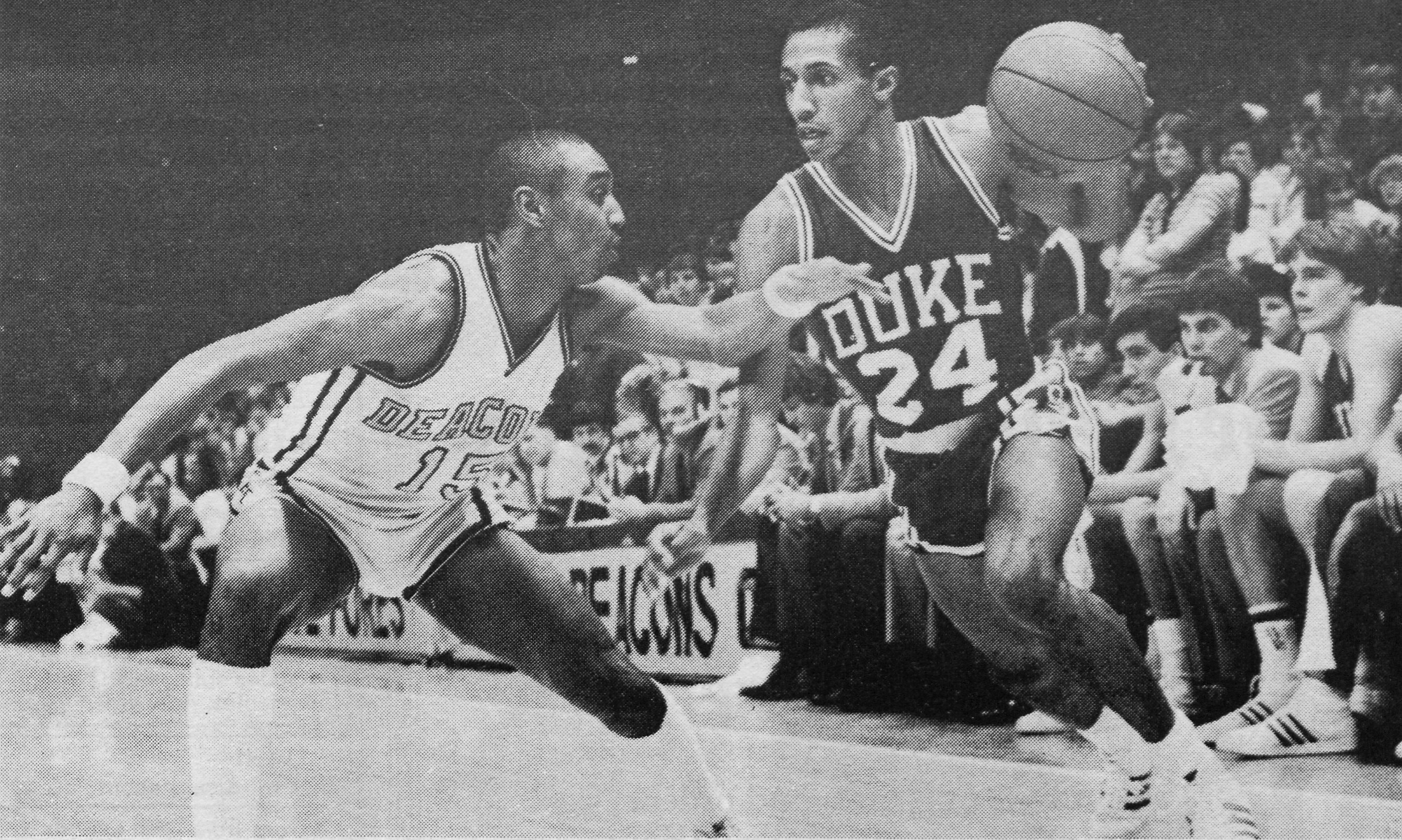
Dawkins (right) against Wake Forest's Delaney Rudd in 1983

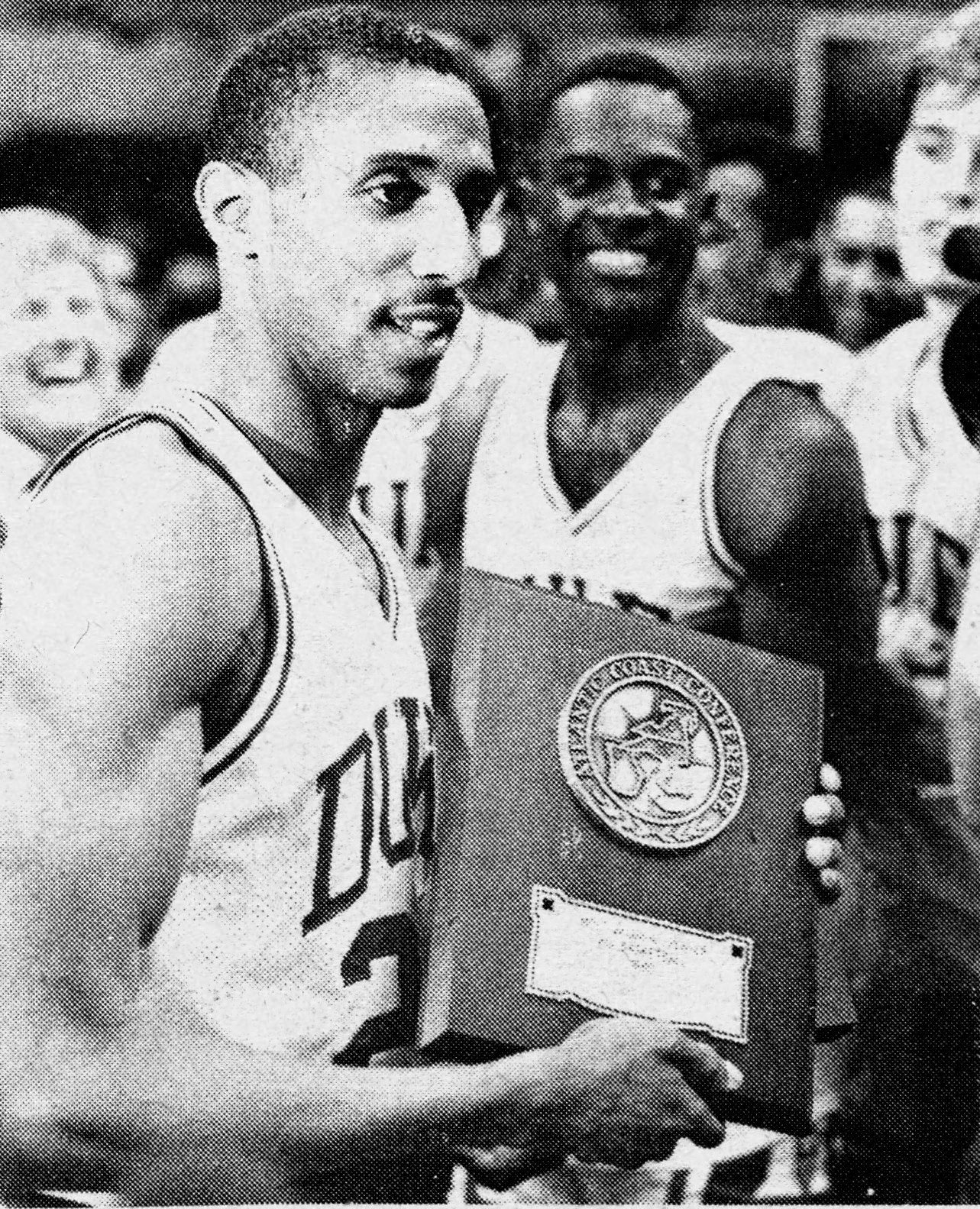
Dawkins holding his MVP award from the 1986 ACC tournament

Dawkins was born and raised in Washington, D.C. He played basketball at Mackin Catholic High School in Washington, D.C. before enrolling at Duke University. At Duke, he became the team's all-time leading scorer with 2,556 points, which stood until 2006 when JJ Redick surpassed it. In Dawkins' senior year at Duke, the 1985–86 season, the Duke Blue Devils attained a win–loss record of 37–3, which was an NCAA record for both games played and games won in a single season. They reached the 1986 NCAA championship game, where they lost to Louisville, 72–69. In his senior season, Dawkins averaged 20.2 points per game and won the Naismith College Player of the Year Award, presented to the nation's top Collegiate Basketball Player. He also served as alternate on the 1984 United States Olympic basketball team. He graduated with a degree in political science.

His jersey number 24 was later retired. Dawkins has received a number of honors, including selection to the ACC 50th Anniversary men's basketball team honoring the 50 greatest players in Atlantic Coast Conference history and being named the 78th greatest player in college basketball history by The Sporting News' book, Legends of College Basketball, in 2002.

=== NBA ===
In the 1986 NBA draft, Dawkins was selected by the San Antonio Spurs as the 10th pick overall. He appeared in the 1987 NBA Slam Dunk Contest, where he finished sixth out of eight. He ended up playing in the NBA for nine seasons, also appearing for the Philadelphia 76ers and the Detroit Pistons. In his NBA career, he averaged 11.1 points, 5.5 assists and 2.5 rebounds.

== Coaching career ==
Following his NBA career, Dawkins went back to Duke University in 1996, where he worked as an administrative intern in the athletic department and was on the air as an analyst for Duke's home basketball games. He joined the Duke coaching staff in 1998, working alongside head coach Mike Krzyzewski. He was promoted to associate head coach in charge of player development in 1999.

In April 2008, he was named head coach at Stanford University, succeeding Trent Johnson. During his time with the Cardinal, he became known as "the king of the NIT" (with crowns in 2012 and 2015). But Dawkins could not get over the hump in the NCAA tournament, with only one appearance (2014) in 8 seasons.

On March 14, 2016, at the conclusion of his eighth season, and after a disappointing one NCAA Tournament appearance in eight seasons as head coach, Dawkins was fired.

On March 23, 2016, Dawkins was hired as head coach by the University of Central Florida. Shortly thereafter, his son, Aubrey Dawkins, transferred from Michigan to play for his father.

On March 2, 2019, UCF defeated (#8 AP Poll/#6 Coaches Poll) Houston at Fertitta Center, stopping the nation's longest home winning streak at 33. With the win UCF entered the AP Poll for the first time since the 2010–11 Knights spent four weeks in the poll, peaking at 19.

== Career statistics ==
Legend
GP	Games played	GS	Games started	MPG	Minutes per game
FG%	Field goal percentage	3P%	3-point field goal percentage	FT%	Free throw percentage
RPG	Rebounds per game	APG	Assists per game	SPG	Steals per game
BPG	Blocks per game	PPG	Points per game	**Bold**	Career high

=== NBA ===
==== Regular season ====
Year	Team	GP	GS	MPG	FG%	3P%	FT%	RPG	APG	SPG	BPG	PPG
1986–87	San Antonio	81	14	20.8	.437	.298	.801	2.1	3.6	.8	.0	10.3
1987–88	San Antonio	65	61	33.5	.485	.311	.896	3.1	**7.4**	1.4	.0	**15.8**
1988–89	San Antonio	32	30	33.8	.443	.000	.893	3.2	7.0	**1.7**	.0	14.2
1989–90	Philadelphia	81	81	**35.4**	.489	.333	.861	3.0	**7.4**	1.5	**.1**	14.3
1990–91	Philadelphia	4	4	31.0	**.634**	.250	**.909**	**4.0**	7.0	.8	.0	**15.8**
1991–92	Philadelphia	**82**	**82**	34.3	.437	**.356**	.882	2.8	6.9	1.1	**.1**	12.0
1992–93	Philadelphia	74	10	21.6	.437	.310	.796	1.8	4.6	1.1	**.1**	8.9
1993–94	Philadelphia	72	12	18.7	.418	.352	.840	1.7	3.7	.9	**.1**	6.6
1994–95	Detroit	50	9	23.4	.463	.342	**.909**	2.3	4.1	1.0	.0	6.5
Career		541	303	27.5	.456	.330	.857	2.5	5.5	1.0	.1	11.1

==== Playoffs ====
Year	Team	GP	GS	MPG	FG%	3P%	FT%	RPG	APG	SPG	BPG	PPG
1988	San Antonio	3	0	17.7	.261	.000	.750	1.0	1.7	.7	.0	5.0
1990	Philadelphia	**10**	**10**	**38.6**	**.461**	.000	**.837**	**2.2**	**9.3**	**1.7**	**.2**	**14.2**
Career		13	10	33.8	.428	.000	.830	1.9	7.5	1.5	.2	12.1

== Head coaching record ==
Record table
Season	Team	Overall	Conference	Standing	Postseason
Stanford Cardinal (Pacific-10/Pac-12 Conference) (2008–2016)
2008–09	Stanford	20–14	6–12	9th	CBI Semifinals
2009–10	Stanford	14–18	7–11	T–8th	
2010–11	Stanford	15–16	7–11	T–7th	
2011–12	Stanford	26–11	10–8	7th	NIT Champions
2012–13	Stanford	19–15	9–9	T–6th	NIT Second Round
2013–14	Stanford	23–13	10–8	T–3rd	NCAA Division I Sweet 16
2014–15	Stanford	24–13	9–9	T–5th	NIT Champions
2015–16	Stanford	15–15	8–10	9th	
Stanford:		156–115 (.576)	66–78 (.458)		
UCF Knights (American Athletic Conference) (2016–2023)
2016–17	UCF	24–12	11–7	4th	NIT Semifinals
2017–18	UCF	19–13	9–9	6th	
2018–19	UCF	24–9	13–5	T–3rd	NCAA Division I Round of 32
2019–20	UCF	16–14	7–11	T–9th	
2020–21	UCF	11–12	8–10	6th	
2021–22	UCF	18–12	9–9	6th	
2022–23	UCF	19–15	8–10	7th	NIT Second Round
UCF Knights (Big 12 Conference) (2023–present)
2023–24	UCF	17–16	7–11	T–11th	NIT First Round
2024–25	UCF	20–17	7–13	T–12th	CBC Runner-up
2025–26	UCF	21–12	9–9	T–7th	NCAA Division I Round of 64
2026–27	UCF	4–2	0–0		
UCF:		193–134 (.590)	88–94 (.484)		
Total:		349–249 (.584)			
National champion Postseason invitational champion Conference regular season champion Conference regular season and conference tournament champion Division regular season champion Division regular season and conference tournament champion Conference tournament champion
