= 1985–86 NC State Wolfpack men's basketball team =

American college basketball season

1985–86 NC State Wolfpack men's basketball

NCAA tournament, Elite 8
- Conference: Atlantic Coast Conference
- Record: 21–13 (7–7 ACC)
- Head coach: Jim Valvano (6th season)
- Assistant coaches: Ray Martin (6th season); Tom Abatemarco (4th season); Ed McLean (4th season)
- Home arena: Reynolds Coliseum

1985–86 ACC men's basketball standings
	Conf.				Overall
Team	W		L	PCT	W		L	PCT
No. 1 Duke†	12	–	2	.857	37	–	3	.925
No. 6 Georgia Tech	11	–	3	.786	27	–	7	.794
No. 8 North Carolina	10	–	4	.714	28	–	6	.824
NC State	7	–	7	.500	21	–	13	.618
Virginia	7	–	7	.500	19	–	11	.633
Maryland	6	–	8	.429	19	–	14	.576
Clemson	3	–	11	.214	19	–	15	.559
Wake Forest	0	–	14	.000	8	–	21	.276
† 1986 ACC tournament winner Rankings from AP Poll

The 1985–86 NC State Wolfpack men's basketball team represented North Carolina State University during the 1985–86 men's college basketball season. It was Jim Valvano's sixth season as head coach.

== Roster ==
1985–86 NC State Wolfpack men's basketball team
Players
Coaches

Pos.	#	Name	Height	Weight	Year	Hometown
G	10	Nate McMillan	6 ft 5 in (1.96 m)	185 lb (84 kg)	Sr	Raleigh, North Carolina
G	11	Kelsey Weems	6 ft 2 in (1.88 m)	180 lb (82 kg)	Fr	Atlanta, Georgia
C	13	Panagiotis Fasoulas	7 ft 0 in (2.13 m)	220 lb (100 kg)	So	Thessaloniki, Greece
F	23	Bennie Bolton	6 ft 8 in (2.03 m)	—	Jr
G	31	Ernie Myers	6 ft 4 in (1.93 m)	203 lb (92 kg)	Sr	Manhattan, New York
F	33	Charles Shackleford	6 ft 10 in (2.08 m)	220 lb (100 kg)	So	Kinston, North Carolina
C	50	Chris Washburn	6 ft 11 in (2.11 m)	225 lb (102 kg)	So	Hickory, North Carolina
F	52	Chucky Brown	6 ft 7 in (2.01 m)	210 lb (95 kg)	Fr	New York, New York

Head coach

- Jim Valvano (Rutgers)

Assistant coach(es)

- Ray Martin (Notre Dame)
- Tom Abatemarco (Dowling)
- Ed McLean (Western Carolina)

Legend

- (C) Team captain
- (S) Suspended
- (I) Ineligible
- (W) Walk-on
- Injured
- Current redshirt

== Schedule ==
Date time, TV	Rank^{#}	Opponent^{#}	Result	Record	Site city, state
Regular season
Nov 25, 1985*	No. 17	Western Carolina	W 80–57	1–0	Reynolds Coliseum; Raleigh, North Carolina
Nov 27, 1985*		Furman	W 94–56	2–0	Reynolds Coliseum; Raleigh, North Carolina
Nov 30, 1985*		at Loyola (IL)	L 58–60	2–1	
Dec 2, 1985*		Tampa	W 88–64	3–1	Reynolds Coliseum; Raleigh, North Carolina
Dec 4, 1985*		at Florida State	L 67–76	3–2	
Dec 7, 1985*		vs. No. 7 Kansas	L 67–75	3–3	Greensboro Coliseum; Greensboro, NC
Dec 19, 1985		Wake Forest	W 77–64	4–3 (1–0)	Reynolds Coliseum; Raleigh, North Carolina
Dec 21, 1985*		Radford	W 92–57	5–3	Reynolds Coliseum; Raleigh, North Carolina
Dec 24, 1985*		vs. Chaminade; Chaminade Classic	W 64–46	6–3	Neal S. Blaisdell Center; Honolulu, Hawaii
Dec 25, 1985*		vs. No. 12 UNLV; Chaminade Classic	W 80–73	7–3	Neal S. Blaisdell Center; Honolulu, Hawaii
Dec 30, 1985*		Monmouth	W 106–53	8–3	Reynolds Coliseum; Raleigh, North Carolina
Jan 4, 1986		at No. 1 North Carolina; Rivalry	L 79–90	8–4 (1–1)	Carmichael Auditorium; Chapel Hill, North Carolina
Jan 8, 1986*		North Carolina A&T	W 66–48	9–4	Reynolds Coliseum; Raleigh, North Carolina
Jan 11, 1986; 12:00 p.m.		at No. 3 Duke	L 67–74	9–5 (1–2)	Cameron Indoor Stadium (8,564); Durham, North Carolina
Jan 15, 1986		Clemson	W 60–57	10–5 (2–2)	Reynolds Coliseum; Raleigh, North Carolina
Jan 18, 1986		at Wake Forest	W 45–44	11–5 (3–2)	
Jan 23, 1986		at Maryland	W 67–55	12–5 (4–2)	Cole Field House; College Park, Maryland
Jan 25, 1986		Virginia	W 55–53	13–5 (5–2)	Reynolds Coliseum; Raleigh, North Carolina
Jan 29, 1986		No. 3 Georgia Tech	L 54–67	13–6 (5–3)	Reynolds Coliseum; Raleigh, North Carolina
Feb 2, 1986*		No. 8 Kentucky	W 54–51	14–6	Reynolds Coliseum; Raleigh, North Carolina
Feb 5, 1986		at Clemson	W 73–69 ^{OT}	15–6 (6–3)	Littlejohn Coliseum; Clemson, South Carolina
Feb 8, 1986*		No. 16 Louisville	W 76–64	16–6	Reynolds Coliseum; Raleigh, North Carolina
Feb 10, 1986*		Brooklyn College	W 103–52	17–6	Reynolds Coliseum; Raleigh, North Carolina
Feb 13, 1986	No. 17	Maryland	L 66–67	17–7 (6–4)	Reynolds Coliseum; Raleigh, North Carolina
Feb 15, 1986; 7:30 p.m.	No. 17	No. 2 Duke	L 70–72	17–8 (6–5)	Reynolds Coliseum (12,400); Raleigh, North Carolina
Feb 19, 1986		at Virginia	L 60–69	17–9 (6–6)	University Hall; Charlottesville, Virginia
Feb 23, 1986	No. 20	No. 1 North Carolina; Rivalry	W 76–65	18–9 (7–6)	Reynolds Coliseum; Raleigh, North Carolina
Feb 27, 1986	No. 18	at No. 4 Georgia Tech	L 57–69	18–10 (7–7)	Alexander Memorial Coliseum; Atlanta, Georgia
Mar 1, 1986*	No. 18	at No. 14 Oklahoma	L 69–72	18–11 (7–8)	Lloyd Noble Center; Norman, Oklahoma
ACC Tournament
Mar 7, 1986*	No. 20	vs. Virginia; ACC tournament Quarterfinal	L 62–64	18–12	Greensboro Coliseum; Greensboro, North Carolina
NCAA Tournament
Mar 14, 1986*; CBS	(6 MW)	vs. (11 MW) Iowa; NCAA tournament first round	W 66–64	19–12	Hubert H. Humphrey Metrodome; Minneapolis, Minnesota
Mar 16, 1986*; CBS	(6 MW)	vs. (14 MW) Arkansas–Little Rock; NCAA tournament second round	W 80–66 ^{2OT}	20–12	Hubert H. Humphrey Metrodome; Minneapolis, Minnesota
Mar 21, 1986*; CBS	(6 MW)	vs. (7 MW) Iowa State; Midwest Regional semifinal	W 70–66	21–12	Kemper Arena; Kansas City, Missouri
Mar 23, 1986*; CBS	(6 MW)	vs. (1 MW) No. 2 Kansas; Midwest Regional Final	L 67–75	21–13	Kemper Arena; Kansas City, Missouri
*Non-conference game. ^{#}Rankings from AP Poll. (#) Tournament seedings in parentheses. MW=Midwest. All times are in Eastern Time.

== Rankings ==
Ranking movements Legend: ██ Increase in ranking ██ Decrease in ranking — = Not ranked т = Tied with team above or below
	Week																
Poll	Pre	1	2	3	4	5	6	7	8	9	10	11	12	13	14	15	Final
AP	17	15	—	—	—	—	—	—	—	—	—	—	17	20	18	20	—
Coaches	14 т	14 т	—	—	—	—	20	—	—	—	—	19	18	17	18	—	—
