= Chuck Swenson =

American collegiate basketball coach

Personal information
- Born: August 31, 1953 (age 73)

Career information
- High school: Crystal Lake Central (Crystal Lake, Illinois)

Career history

Coaching
- 1976–1977: Indiana (grad assistant)
- 1977–1980: Army (assistant)
- 1980–1987: Duke (assistant)
- 1987–1994: William & Mary
- 1994–1996: Duke (director of operations)
- 1996–2001: Penn State (assistant)
- 2001–2007: Michigan (assistant)

Chuck Swenson (born August 31, 1953) is a former American collegiate basketball coach. He was the head coach for the William & Mary Tribe men's basketball team from 1987 to 1994. He had previously served as an assistant coach to Mike Krzyzewski from 1980 to 1987 at Duke. He later served as an assistant to Tommy Amaker at Michigan. At William & Mary, Swenson had an overall record of 62–134 with a mark of 27–71 in Colonial Athletic Association play.

Swenson graduated in 1972 from Crystal Lake Central High School in Crystal Lake, Illinois. He is the son of basketball coach John Swenson. As a senior in college, Swenson was the men's basketball team manager for the Indiana Hoosiers during their undefeated 1976 national championship season. Swenson is also notable as a contributing author to numerous basketball publishings and books. His efforts as a motivational speaker have been recognized by many organizations and universities.
