= 1983–84 Wake Forest Demon Deacons men's basketball team =

American college basketball season

1983–84 Wake Forest Demon Deacons men's basketball

NCAA tournament, Elite Eight
- Conference: Atlantic Coast Conference

Ranking
- AP: No. 19
- Record: 23–9 (7–7 ACC)
- Head coach: Carl Tacy (12th season)
- Assistant coaches: Ernie Nestor; Mark Freidinger
- Home arena: Winston-Salem Memorial Coliseum

1983–84 ACC men's basketball standings
	Conf.				Overall
Team	W		L	PCT	W		L	PCT
No. 1 North Carolina	14	–	0	1.000	28	–	3	.903
No. 11 Maryland †	9	–	5	.643	24	–	8	.750
No. 19 Wake Forest	7	–	7	.500	23	–	9	.719
No. 14 Duke	7	–	7	.500	24	–	10	.706
Georgia Tech	6	–	8	.429	18	–	11	.621
Virginia	6	–	8	.429	21	–	12	.636
NC State	4	–	10	.286	19	–	14	.576
Clemson	3	–	11	.214	14	–	14	.500
† 1984 ACC tournament winner Rankings from AP Poll

The 1983–84 Wake Forest Demon Deacons men's basketball team represented Wake Forest University as a member of the Atlantic Coast Conference during the 1983–84 season. Led by head coach Carl Tacy, the team finished the season with an overall record of 23–9 (7–7 ACC) and reached the Elite Eight of the NCAA tournament as No. 4 seed in the Midwest region.

== Roster ==
1983–84 Wake Forest Demon Deacons men's basketball team
Players
Coaches

Pos.	#	Name	Height	Weight	Year	Hometown
G	14	Muggsy Bogues	5 ft 3 in (1.6 m)	135 lb (61 kg)	Fr	Baltimore, Maryland
G	10	Scott Davis	6 ft 2 in (1.88 m)	164 lb (74 kg)	Sr	Monaca, Pennsylvania
F	34	Lee Garber	6 ft 5 in (1.96 m)	194 lb (88 kg)	Jr	Kingsport, Tennessee
F	21	Kenny Green	6 ft 6 in (1.98 m)	205 lb (93 kg)	So	Eustis, Florida
F/C	21	Mike Hillman	6 ft 9 in (2.06 m)	225 lb (102 kg)	Fr	Aitkin, Minnesota
F/C	44	Tony Karasek	6 ft 9 in (2.06 m)	210 lb (95 kg)	So	East Moline, Illinois
G	22	Chuck Kepley	6 ft 4 in (1.93 m)	175 lb (79 kg)	So	Roanoke, Virginia
F	42	Mark Kline	6 ft 7 in (2.01 m)	193 lb (88 kg)	Fr	South Williamson, Kentucky
F	43	Todd May	6 ft 8 in (2.03 m)	190 lb (86 kg)	So	Virgie, Kentucky
G	15	Delaney Rudd	6 ft 2 in (1.88 m)	178 lb (81 kg)	Jr	Hollister, North Carolina
C	55	Anthony Teachey	6 ft 9 in (2.06 m)	210 lb (95 kg)	Sr	Goldsboro, North Carolina
G/F	3	John Toms	6 ft 6 in (1.98 m)	200 lb (91 kg)	Sr	Shelby, North Carolina
G	11	Steve Warden	6 ft 5 in (1.96 m)	195 lb (88 kg)	So	Lewisville, North Carolina
C	53	Craig Wessel	7 ft 0 in (2.13 m)	235 lb (107 kg)	Fr	Elkhorn, Wisconsin
G	12	Danny Young	6 ft 3 in (1.91 m)	174 lb (79 kg)	Sr	Raleigh, North Carolina

Head coach

- Carl Tacy (Davis & Elkins)

Assistant coach(es)

- Ernie Nestor (Alderson Broaddus)
- Mark Freidinger (Rollins)

Legend

- (C) Team captain
- (S) Suspended
- (I) Ineligible
- (W) Walk-on
- Injured
- Current redshirt

== Schedule and results ==
The Demon Deacons were an uncanny 6–1 in overtime games, including a win over #1 seed DePaul in the Sweet Sixteen.

Date time, TV	Rank^{#}	Opponent^{#}	Result	Record	Site city, state
Regular season
Nov 28, 1983*		Furman	W 74–59	1–0	Winston-Salem Memorial Coliseum; Winston-Salem, North Carolina
Dec 2, 1983*		vs. Virginia Tech	W 88–80 ^{OT}	2–0	Greensboro, North Carolina
Dec 3, 1983*		vs. Charlotte	W 77–55	3–0	Greensboro, North Carolina
Dec 6, 1983*		Davidson	W 62–51	4–0	Winston-Salem Memorial Coliseum; Winston-Salem, North Carolina
Dec 10, 1983*		Appalachian State	W 72–46	5–0	Winston-Salem Memorial Coliseum; Winston-Salem, North Carolina
Dec 21, 1983*	No. 17	at Marquette	W 71–65 ^{OT}	6–0	MECCA Arena; Milwaukee, Wisconsin
Dec 27, 1983*	No. 10	vs. Auburn; Gator Bowl Tournament	W 76–67	7–0	Jacksonville Memorial Coliseum; Jacksonville, Florida
Dec 28, 1983*	No. 10	at Jacksonville; Gator Bowl Tournament	W 57–54	8–0	Jacksonville Memorial Coliseum; Jacksonville, Florida
Dec 30, 1983*	No. 10	at Rollins	W 112–74	9–0	Winter Park, Florida
Jan 4, 1984*	No. 8	Richmond	W 82–57	10–0	Winston-Salem Memorial Coliseum; Winston-Salem, North Carolina
Jan 7, 1984	No. 8	at Georgia Tech	L 66–68	10–1 (0–1)	Alexander Memorial Coliseum; Atlanta, Georgia
Jan 11, 1984*	No. 12	William & Mary	W 80–53	11–1	Winston-Salem Memorial Coliseum; Winston-Salem, North Carolina
Jan 14, 1984	No. 12	No. 1 North Carolina	L 62–70	11–2 (0–2)	Winston-Salem Memorial Coliseum; Winston-Salem, North Carolina
Jan 18, 1984	No. 12	vs. Duke	W 97–66	12–2 (1–2)	Winston-Salem Memorial Coliseum; Winston-Salem, North Carolina
Jan 21, 1984	No. 12	at NC State	L 69–80	12–3 (1–3)	Reynolds Coliseum; Raleigh, North Carolina
Jan 25, 1984	No. 17	at No. 1 North Carolina	L 63–100	12–4 (1–4)	Carmichael Auditorium; Chapel Hill, North Carolina
Jan 28, 1984	No. 17	No. 19 Virginia	W 84–76	13–4 (2–4)	Winston-Salem Memorial Coliseum; Winston-Salem, North Carolina
Feb 2, 1984	No. 15	No. 18 Georgia Tech	W 78–74 ^{OT}	14–4 (3–4)	Winston-Salem Memorial Coliseum; Winston-Salem, North Carolina
Feb 4, 1984	No. 15	at Clemson	W 76–72 ^{OT}	15–4 (4–4)	Littlejohn Coliseum; Clemson, South Carolina
Feb 8, 1984	No. 14	No. 13 Maryland	W 90–87 ^{2OT}	16–4 (5–4)	Winston-Salem Memorial Coliseum; Winston-Salem, North Carolina
Feb 11, 1984*	No. 14	UNC Wilmington	W 64–50	17–4	Winston-Salem Memorial Coliseum; Winston-Salem, North Carolina
Feb 15, 1984	No. 13	Clemson	W 68–57	18–4 (6–4)	Winston-Salem Memorial Coliseum; Winston-Salem, North Carolina
Feb 18, 1984	No. 13	at No. 19 Duke	L 77–79 ^{OT}	18–5 (6–5)	Cameron Indoor Stadium; Durham, North Carolina
Feb 22, 1984*	No. 15	Monmouth	W 85–57	19–5	Winston-Salem Memorial Coliseum; Winston-Salem, North Carolina
Feb 26, 1984	No. 15	at Maryland	L 79–90	19–6 (6–6)	Cole Fieldhouse; College Park, Maryland
Feb 29, 1984	No. 17	at Virginia	L 61–65	19–7 (6–7)	University Hall; Charlottesville, Virginia
Mar 3, 1984	No. 17	NC State	W 84–75	20–7 (7–7)	Winston-Salem Memorial Coliseum; Winston-Salem, North Carolina
ACC Tournament
Mar 9, 1984*	No. 19	vs. Virginia; ACC Tournament Quarterfinal	W 63–51	21–7	Greensboro Coliseum; Greensboro, North Carolina
Mar 10, 1984*	No. 19	vs. No. 14 Maryland; ACC Tournament Semifinal	L 64–66	21–8	Greensboro Coliseum; Greensboro, North Carolina
NCAA Tournament
Mar 18, 1984*	No. 19	vs. Kansas; Second Round	W 69–59	22–8	Bob Devaney Sports Center; Lincoln, Nebraska
Mar 23, 1984*	No. 19	vs. No. 4 DePaul; Midwest Regional semifinal – Sweet Sixteen	W 73–71 ^{OT}	23–8	St. Louis Arena; St. Louis, Missouri
Mar 25, 1984*	No. 19	vs. No. 5 Houston; Midwest Regional final – Elite Eight	L 63–68	23–9	St. Louis Arena; St. Louis, Missouri
*Non-conference game. ^{#}Rankings from AP Poll. (#) Tournament seedings in parentheses. MW=Midwest.

== Rankings ==
Ranking movements Legend: ██ Increase in ranking ██ Decrease in ranking — = Not ranked
	Week																
Poll	Pre	1	2	3	4	5	6	7	8	9	10	11	12	13	14	15	Final
AP	—	—	—	19	17	10	8	12	12	17	15	14	13	15	17	19	19
Coaches	Not released		—	—	20	11	9	13	13	17	15	17	15	—	16	—	—
