= 1983–84 Virginia Cavaliers men's basketball team =

American college basketball season

1983–84 Virginia Cavaliers men's basketball

NCAA tournament, Final Four
- Conference: Atlantic Coast Conference
- Record: 21–12 (6–8 ACC)
- Head coach: Terry Holland (10th season)
- Assistant coaches: Jim Larrañaga (5th season); Jeff Jones (2nd season); Dave Odom (2nd season)
- Home arena: University Hall

1983–84 ACC men's basketball standings
	Conf.				Overall
Team	W		L	PCT	W		L	PCT
No. 1 North Carolina	14	–	0	1.000	28	–	3	.903
No. 11 Maryland †	9	–	5	.643	24	–	8	.750
No. 19 Wake Forest	7	–	7	.500	23	–	9	.719
No. 14 Duke	7	–	7	.500	24	–	10	.706
Georgia Tech	6	–	8	.429	18	–	11	.621
Virginia	6	–	8	.429	21	–	12	.636
NC State	4	–	10	.286	19	–	14	.576
Clemson	3	–	11	.214	14	–	14	.500
† 1984 ACC tournament winner Rankings from AP Poll

The 1983–84 Virginia Cavaliers men's basketball team represented the University of Virginia and was a member of the Atlantic Coast Conference. Until 2019, this marked the last season the Virginia men's basketball team reached the NCAA Final Four.

== Roster ==
1983–84 Virginia Cavaliers men's basketball team
Players
Coaches

Pos.	#	Name	Height	Weight	Year	Hometown
F	4	Jim Miller	6 ft 8 in (2.03 m)	212 lb (96 kg)	Jr	Princeton, West Virginia
G	11	Othell Wilson	6 ft 0 in (1.83 m)	193 lb (88 kg)	Sr	Woodbridge, Virginia
G	12	Anthony Solomon	5 ft 10 in (1.78 m)	160 lb (73 kg)	Fr	Newport News, Virginia
G	15	Ricky Stokes	5 ft 10 in (1.78 m)	169 lb (77 kg)	Sr	Richmond, Virginia
F	22	Tom Sheehey	6 ft 9 in (2.06 m)	217 lb (98 kg)	Fr	Rochester, New York
F	24	Olden Polynice	6 ft 11 in (2.11 m)	210 lb (95 kg)	Fr	Port-au-Prince, Haiti
F	30	Kenton Edelin	6 ft 8 in (2.03 m)	204 lb (93 kg)	Sr	Alexandria, Virginia
G	33	Kenny Johnson	6 ft 0 in (1.83 m)	171 lb (78 kg)	Jr	Baltimore, Maryland
G	34	Rick Carlisle	6 ft 5 in (1.96 m)	207 lb (94 kg)	Sr	Ogdensburg, New York
G	44	Kenny Lambiotte	6 ft 4 in (1.93 m)	195 lb (88 kg)	So	Woodstock, Virginia
G	45	Tim Mullen	6 ft 5 in (1.96 m)	194 lb (88 kg)	Jr	Ridgewood, New Jersey
F	51	Dan Merrifield	6 ft 6 in (1.98 m)	226 lb (103 kg)	Jr	Linwood, New Jersey

Head coach

- Terry Holland (Davidson)

Assistant coach(es)

- Jim Larrañaga (Providence)
- Jeff Jones (Virginia)
- Dave Odom (Guilford)

Legend

- (C) Team captain
- (S) Suspended
- (I) Ineligible
- (W) Walk-on
- Injured
- Current redshirt

== Schedule ==
Date time, TV	Rank^{#}	Opponent^{#}	Result	Record	Site (attendance) city, state
Regular season
Dec 17, 1983*		UNC Wilmington	W 87–42	7–0	University Hall (7,622); Charlottesville, VA
Jan 7, 1984	No. 20	Duke	L 72–78	10–1 (0–1)	University Hall (9,000); Charlottesville, VA
Jan 11, 1984		NC State	W 57–54	11–1 (1–1)	University Hall (9,000); Charlottesville, Virginia
Jan 18, 1984		at No. 1 North Carolina	L 66–69	11–2 (1–2)	Carmichael Arena (10,000); Chapel Hill, NC
Jan 21, 1984		at Clemson	W 74–73	12–2 (2–2)	Littlejohn Coliseum (9,500); Clemson, SC
Jan 23, 1984	No. 19	at Georgia Tech	L 71–72 ^{3OT}	12–3 (2–3)	Alexander Memorial Coliseum (6,645); Atlanta, GA
Jan 28, 1984	No. 19	at No. 17 Wake Forest	L 76–84	12–4 (2–4)	Winston-Salem Memorial Coliseum (13,685); Winston-Salem, NC
Jan 31, 1984		No. 10 Maryland	L 66–67	12–5 (2–5)	University Hall (9,000); Charlottesville, VA
Feb 4, 1984		at Duke	L 64–67	12–6 (2–6)	Cameron Indoor Stadium (8,564); Durham, NC
Feb 7, 1984		No. 18 Georgia Tech	W 91–59	13–6 (3–6)	University Hall (9,000); Charlottesville, Virginia
Feb 9, 1984		No. 1 North Carolina	L 72–85	13–7 (3–7)	University Hall (9,000); Charlottesville, VA
Feb 18, 1984*		at No. 4 Houston	L 65–74	14–9	Hofheinz Pavilion (10,600); Houston, TX
Feb 22, 1984		Clemson	W 77–70	15–9 (4–7)	University Hall (9,000); Charlottesville, Virginia
Feb 25, 1984		at NC State	W 75–64	16–9 (5–7)	Reynolds Coliseum (12,400); Raleigh, NC
Feb 29, 1984		No. 17 Wake Forest	W 65–61	17–9 (6–7)	University Hall (9,000); Charlottesville, VA
Mar 4, 1984		at No. 19 Maryland	L 65–74	17–10 (6–8)	Cole Fieldhouse (14,470); College Park, MD
ACC Tournament
Mar 9, 1984*	(6)	vs. (3) No. 19 Wake Forest; ACC Quarterfinals	L 51–63	17–11	Greensboro Coliseum (16,662); Greensboro, NC
NCAA Tournament
Mar 16, 1984*	(7 E)	vs. (10 E) Iona; NCAA First Round	W 58–57	18–11	Brendan Byrne Arena (16,714); East Rutherford, NJ
Mar 18, 1984*	(7 E)	vs. (2 E) No. 8 Arkansas; NCAA Second Round	W 53–51 ^{OT}	19–11	Brendan Byrne Arena (19,524); East Rutherford, NJ
Mar 22, 1984*	(7 E)	vs. (3 E) No. 18 Syracuse; NCAA Sweet Sixteen	W 63–55	20–11	The Omni (16,723); Atlanta, GA
Mar 24, 1984*	(7 E)	vs. (4 E) Indiana; NCAA Elite Eight	W 50–48	21–11	The Omni (16,723); Atlanta, GA
Mar 31, 1984*	(7 E)	vs. (2 MW) No. 5 Houston; NCAA Final Four	L 47–49 ^{OT}	21–12	Kingdome (38,471); Seattle, WA
*Non-conference game. ^{#}Rankings from AP Poll. (#) Tournament seedings in parentheses. E=East. All times are in Eastern Time.

== Team players drafted into the NBA ==
Round	Pick	Player	NBA club
2	35	Othell Wilson	Golden State Warriors
