= Clemson Tigers men's basketball, 1980–1989 =

US uiniversity basketball team

The Clemson Tigers men's basketball teams of 1980–1989 represented Clemson University in NCAA college basketball competition.

== 1979–80 ==
1979–80 Clemson Tigers men's basketball

IPTAY Tournament champions

NCAA tournament, Elite Eight
- Conference: Atlantic Coast Conference
- Record: 23–9 (8–6 ACC)
- Head coach: Bill Foster
- Home arena: Littlejohn Coliseum

1979–80 ACC men's basketball standings
	Conf.				Overall
Team	W		L	PCT	W		L	PCT
No. 8 Maryland	11	–	3	.786	24	–	7	.774
No. 15 North Carolina	9	–	5	.643	21	–	8	.724
NC State	9	–	5	.643	20	–	8	.714
Clemson	8	–	6	.571	23	–	9	.719
Virginia	7	–	7	.500	24	–	10	.706
No. 14 Duke †	7	–	7	.500	24	–	9	.727
Wake Forest	4	–	10	.286	13	–	14	.481
Georgia Tech	1	–	13	.071	8	–	18	.308
† 1980 ACC tournament winner Rankings from AP Poll

Date	Opponent	Rank^{#}	Site	Result
November 30*	Siena		Littlejohn Coliseum • Clemson, SC (IPTAY Tournament Semifinal)	W 90–72
December 1*	Middle Tennessee		Littlejohn Coliseum • Clemson, SC (IPTAY Tournament Final)	W 94–61
December 5*	South Carolina		Littlejohn Coliseum • Clemson, SC	W 93–73
December 8*	Baptist		Littlejohn Coliseum • Clemson, SC	W 93–59
December 15*	Rider		Littlejohn Coliseum • Clemson, SC	W 98–73
December 17*	Georgia Southern		Littlejohn Coliseum • Clemson, SC	W 113–74
December 27*	vs. Texas Tech		Memorial Coliseum • Portland, OR (Far West Classic Quarterfinal)	W 79–68
December 28*	vs. UNC–Charlotte		Memorial Coliseum • Portland, OR (Far West Classic Semifinal)	W 85–65
December 29*	vs. #18 Oregon State		Memorial Coliseum • Portland, OR (Far West Classic Final)	L 67–72
January 2	#6 North Carolina		Littlejohn Coliseum • Clemson, SC	W 93–76
January 5	at Georgia Tech		Alexander Memorial Coliseum • Atlanta, GA	W 56–48
January 9	#1 Duke	#18	Littlejohn Coliseum • Clemson, SC	W 87–82 (OT)
January 12	at Wake Forest	#18	Winston–Salem Memorial Coliseum • Winston-Salem, NC	L 83–86
January 16	at Maryland	#17	Cole Field House • College Park, MD	L 83–84
January 19	#12 Virginia	#17	Littlejohn Coliseum • Clemson, SC	W 88–68
January 23*	Furman	#12	Littlejohn Coliseum • Clemson, SC	W 85–67
January 26	at #13 North Carolina	#12	Carmichael Auditorium • Chapel Hill, NC	L 70–73
January 29	at NC State	#16	Reynolds Coliseum • Raleigh, NC	L 67–80
January 31	Georgia Tech	#16	Littlejohn Coliseum • Clemson, SC	W 76–52
February 2*	at South Carolina	#16	Carolina Coliseum • Columbia, SC	W 61–60
February 6	Wake Forest	#16	Littlejohn Coliseum • Clemson, SC	W 86–69
February 9	#9 Maryland	#16	Littlejohn Coliseum • Clemson, SC	W 90–81
February 13	at Virginia	#10	University Hall • Charlottesville, VA	L 87–89
February 16	NC State	#10	Littlejohn Coliseum • Clemson, SC	W 78–70
February 20	at #17 Duke	#12	Cameron Indoor Stadium • Durham, NC	L 82–87 (OT)
February 22*	UNC–Asheville	#12	Littlejohn Coliseum • Clemson, SC	W 38–27
February 28*	vs. Virginia	#17	Greensboro Coliseum • Greensboro, NC (ACC Tournament Quarterfinal)	W 57–49
February 29*	vs. #7 Maryland	#17	Greensboro Coliseum • Greensboro, NC (ACC Tournament Semifinal)	L 85–91
March 6*	vs. Utah State		Dee Events Center • Ogden, UT (NCAA First Round)	W 76–73
March 8*	vs. #12 Brigham Young		Dee Events Center • Ogden, UT (NCAA Second Round)	W 71–66
March 12*	vs. Lamar		McKale Center • Tucson, AZ (NCAA Sweet Sixteen)	W 74–66
March 15*	vs. UCLA		McKale Center • Tucson, AZ (NCAA Elite Eight)	L 74–85
*Non-Conference Game. #Rankings from AP Poll released prior to game.

== 1980–81 ==
1980–81 Clemson Tigers men's basketball

IPTAY Tournament champions Rainbow Classic champions

NIT, First Round
- Conference: Atlantic Coast Conference
- Record: 20–11 (6–8 ACC)
- Head coach: Bill Foster
- Home arena: Littlejohn Coliseum

1980–81 ACC men's basketball standings
	Conf.				Overall
Team	W		L	PCT	W		L	PCT
No. 5 Virginia	13	–	1	.929	29	–	4	.879
No. 6 North Carolina †	10	–	4	.714	29	–	8	.784
No. 11 Wake Forest	9	–	5	.643	22	–	7	.759
No. 18 Maryland	8	–	6	.571	21	–	10	.677
Duke	6	–	8	.429	17	–	13	.567
Clemson	6	–	8	.429	20	–	11	.645
NC State	4	–	10	.286	14	–	13	.519
Georgia Tech	0	–	14	.000	4	–	23	.148
† 1981 ACC tournament winner Rankings from AP Poll

Date	Opponent	Rank^{#}	Site	Result
November 28*	Cornell		Littlejohn Coliseum • Clemson, SC (IPTAY Tournament Semifinal)	W 82–64
November 29*	Fairfield		Littlejohn Coliseum • Clemson, SC (IPTAY Tournament Final)	W 99–71
December 3*	Samford		Littlejohn Coliseum • Clemson, SC	W 102–59
December 6*	at South Carolina		Carolina Coliseum • Columbia, SC	W 82–69
December 13*	Illinois Tech		Littlejohn Coliseum • Clemson, SC	W 108–41
December 16*	West Virginia Tech		Littlejohn Coliseum • Clemson, SC	W 124–70
December 19*	vs. Illinois State		MECCA Arena • Milwaukee, WI (Milwaukee Classic Semifinal)	W 67–56
December 20*	vs. Marquette		MECCA Arena • Milwaukee, WI (Milwaukee Classic Final)	L 67–68
December 28*	vs. Louisiana Tech		Neal S. Blaisdell Center • Honolulu, HI (Rainbow Classic Quarterfinal)	W 50–49 (OT)
December 29*	vs. #15 Indiana		Neal S. Blaisdell Center • Honolulu, HI (Rainbow Classic Semifinal)	W 58–57
December 30*	vs. Hawaiʻi		Neal S. Blaisdell Center • Honolulu, HI (Rainbow Classic Final)	W 75–71
January 3	NC State		Littlejohn Coliseum • Clemson, SC	W 76–68
January 7	at Georgia Tech	#20	Omni Coliseum • Atlanta, GA	W 65–54
January 10	at #6 Wake Forest	#20	Winston–Salem Memorial Coliseum • Winston-Salem, NC	L 71–73
January 14*	The Citadel	#19	Littlejohn Coliseum • Clemson, SC	W 82–58
January 17	#10 Maryland	#19	Littlejohn Coliseum • Clemson, SC	L 62–68 (OT)
January 19	#2 Virginia	#19	Littlejohn Coliseum • Clemson, SC	L 59–74
January 21	Georgia Tech	#19	Littlejohn Coliseum • Clemson, SC	W 72–48
January 24	at Duke	#19	Cameron Indoor Stadium • Durham, NC	L 57–75
January 28	#12 North Carolina		Littlejohn Coliseum • Clemson, SC	L 47–61
January 31*	at Furman		Alley Gymnasium • Greenville, SC	W 69–67
February 4	at NC State		Reynolds Coliseum • Raleigh, NC	W 82–76
February 8*	South Carolina		Littlejohn Coliseum • Clemson, SC	W 115–91
February 12	at #19 Maryland		Cole Field House • College Park, MD	L 70–72
February 14	at #1 Virginia		University Hall • Charlottesville, VA	L 58–73
February 18	#11 Wake Forest		Littlejohn Coliseum • Clemson, SC	W 81–71
February 21	at #13 North Carolina		Carmichael Auditorium • Chapel Hill, NC	L 61–75
February 25	Duke		Littlejohn Coliseum • Clemson, SC	W 54–52
February 28*	Baltimore		Littlejohn Coliseum • Clemson, SC	W 91–69
March 5*	vs. #11 Maryland		Capital Centre • Landover, MD (ACC Tournament Quarterfinal)	L 71–80
March 12*	Temple		Littlejohn Coliseum • Clemson, SC (NIT First Round)	L 82–90
*Non-Conference Game. #Rankings from AP Poll released prior to game.

== 1981–82 ==
1981–82 Clemson Tigers men's basketball

IPTAY Tournament champions

NIT, First Round
- Conference: Atlantic Coast Conference
- Record: 14–14 (4–10 ACC)
- Head coach: Bill Foster
- Home arena: Littlejohn Coliseum

1981–82 ACC men's basketball standings
	Conf.				Overall
Team	W		L	PCT	W		L	PCT
No. 1 North Carolina †	12	–	2	.857	32	–	2	.941
No. 7 Virginia	12	–	2	.857	30	–	4	.882
No. 16 Wake Forest	9	–	5	.643	21	–	9	.700
No. 10 NC State	7	–	7	.500	22	–	10	.688
Maryland	5	–	9	.357	16	–	13	.552
Duke	4	–	10	.286	10	–	17	.370
Clemson	4	–	10	.286	14	–	14	.500
Georgia Tech	3	–	11	.214	10	–	16	.385
† 1982 ACC tournament winner Rankings from AP poll

Date	Opponent	Site	Result
November 27*	Bowling Green	Littlejohn Coliseum • Clemson, SC (IPTAY Tournament Semifinal)	W 109–91
November 28*	Stetson	Littlejohn Coliseum • Clemson, SC (IPTAY Tournament Final)	W 79–72
December 2*	Austin Peay State	Littlejohn Coliseum • Clemson, SC	W 102–53
December 5*	Arkansas–Little Rock	Littlejohn Coliseum • Clemson, SC	W 61–60
December 12*	South Carolina	Littlejohn Coliseum • Clemson, SC	W 67–65
December 14*	West Chester State	Littlejohn Coliseum • Clemson, SC	W 96–56
December 18*	vs. #6 Iowa	Hofheinz Pavilion • Houston, TX (Kettle Classic Semifinal)	L 68–80
December 19*	vs. Mississippi State	Hofheinz Pavilion • Houston, TX (Milwaukee Classic Consolation)	W 59–32
January 2	at #20 NC State	Reynolds Coliseum • Raleigh, NC	L 59–75
January 6	at Georgia Tech	Alexander Memorial Coliseum • Atlanta, GA	W 62–57
January 9	Wake Forest	Littlejohn Coliseum • Clemson, SC	L 54–68
January 16	at Maryland	Cole Field House • College Park, MD	L 57–62
January 17	at #3 Virginia	University Hall • Charlottesville, VA	L 68–89
January 20	Georgia Tech	Littlejohn Coliseum • Clemson, SC	W 55–49
January 23	Duke	Littlejohn Coliseum • Clemson, SC	L 44–50
January 27	at #2 North Carolina	Carmichael Auditorium • Chapel Hill, NC	L 72–77
January 30*	at The Citadel	McAlister Field House • Charleston, SC	W 88–56
February 3	NC State	Littlejohn Coliseum • Clemson, SC	W 65–54
February 6*	at South Carolina	Carolina Coliseum • Columbia, SC	L 86–94
February 10	at #16 Wake Forest	Winston–Salem Memorial Coliseum • Winston-Salem, NC	L 79–94
February 13	#1 Virginia	Littlejohn Coliseum • Clemson, SC	L 54–56
February 15*	Furman	Littlejohn Coliseum • Clemson, SC	W 79–62
February 17	Maryland	Littlejohn Coliseum • Clemson, SC	W 75–66
February 20	#2 North Carolina	Littlejohn Coliseum • Clemson, SC	L 49–55
February 24	at Duke	Cameron Indoor Stadium • Durham, NC	L 72–73 (3OT)
February 27*	Maryland–Eastern Shore	Littlejohn Coliseum • Clemson, SC	W 91–70
March 5*	vs. #3 Virginia	Greensboro Coliseum • Greensboro, NC (ACC Tournament Quarterfinal)	L 54–56
March 12*	Ole Miss	Littlejohn Coliseum • Clemson, SC (NIT First Round)	L 49–53
*Non-Conference Game. #Rankings from AP Poll released prior to game.

== 1982–83 ==
1982–83 Clemson Tigers men's basketball
- Conference: Atlantic Coast Conference
- Record: 11–20 (2–12 ACC)
- Head coach: Bill Foster
- Home arena: Littlejohn Coliseum

1982–83 ACC men's basketball standings
	Conf.				Overall
Team	W		L	PCT	W		L	PCT
No. 8 North Carolina	12	–	2	.857	28	–	8	.778
No. 4 Virginia	12	–	2	.857	29	–	5	.853
Maryland	8	–	6	.571	20	–	10	.667
No. 16 NC State †	8	–	6	.571	26	–	10	.722
Wake Forest	7	–	7	.500	20	–	10	.667
Georgia Tech	4	–	10	.286	13	–	15	.464
Duke	3	–	11	.214	11	–	17	.393
Clemson	2	–	12	.143	11	–	20	.355
† 1983 ACC tournament winner Rankings from AP poll

Date	Opponent	Site	Result
November 26*	vs. Texas A&M	Buckner Fieldhouse • Anchorage, AK (Great Alaska Shootout Quarterfinal)	W 82–79 (2OT)
November 27*	vs. Vanderbilt	Buckner Fieldhouse • Anchorage, AK (Great Alaska Shootout Semifinal)	L 63–72
November 28*	vs. Washington	Buckner Fieldhouse • Anchorage, AK (Great Alaska Shootout 3rd Place game)	L 66–76
December 3*	Bucknell	Littlejohn Coliseum • Clemson, SC (IPTAY Tournament Semifinal)	W 85–73
December 4*	Southern Miss	Littlejohn Coliseum • Clemson, SC (IPTAY Tournament Final)	L 58–60
December 6*	The Citadel	Littlejohn Coliseum • Clemson, SC	W 63–56
December 11*	Presbyterian	Littlejohn Coliseum • Clemson, SC	W 95–69
December 15*	Campbell	Littlejohn Coliseum • Clemson, SC	W 76–59
December 18*	Vanderbilt	Littlejohn Coliseum • Clemson, SC	L 72–75
December 28*	vs. Kansas State	Special Events Center • El Paso, TX (Sun Bowl Carnival Semifinal)	L 54–60
December 29*	vs. UTEP	Special Events Center • El Paso, TX (Sun Bowl Carnival Consolation)	L 59–69
January 4*	Furman	Alley Gymnasium • Greenville, SC	W 51–50
January 7	#16 NC State	Littlejohn Coliseum • Clemson, SC	L 70–76
January 11	at Georgia Tech	Alexander Memorial Coliseum • Atlanta, GA	L 66–71
January 15	at Wake Forest	Winston–Salem Memorial Coliseum • Winston-Salem, NC	L 76–89
January 19	Maryland	Littlejohn Coliseum • Clemson, SC	L 61–80
January 22	at #7 Virginia	University Hall • Charlottesville, VA	L 87–105
January 24	Georgia Tech	Littlejohn Coliseum • Clemson, SC	W 58–56
January 27*	at South Carolina	Carolina Coliseum • Columbia, SC	L 77–94
January 29	at Duke	Cameron Indoor Stadium • Durham, NC	L 96–99
February 2	#1 North Carolina	Littlejohn Coliseum • Clemson, SC	L 81–84
February 5*	Baptist	Littlejohn Coliseum • Clemson, SC	W 81–60
February 9	at NC State	Reynolds Coliseum • Raleigh, NC	L 83–90
February 12*	South Carolina	Littlejohn Coliseum • Clemson, SC	W 86–81
February 16	Wake Forest	Littlejohn Coliseum • Clemson, SC	L 82–86
February 19	at Maryland	Cole Field House • College Park, MD	L 88–92
February 23	#3 Virginia	Littlejohn Coliseum • Clemson, SC	L 83–85 (OT)
February 27	at #11 North Carolina	Carmichael Auditorium • Chapel Hill, NC	L 80–93
March 2	Duke	Littlejohn Coliseum • Clemson, SC	W 93–86
March 5*	Illinois–Chicago	Littlejohn Coliseum • Clemson, SC	W 92–88
March 11*	vs. #5 North Carolina	Omni Coliseum • Atlanta, GA (ACC Tournament Quarterfinal)	L 79–105
*Non-Conference Game. #Rankings from AP Poll released prior to game.

== 1983–84 ==
1983–84 Clemson Tigers men's basketball

IPTAY Tournament champions
- Conference: Atlantic Coast Conference
- Record: 14–14 (3–11 ACC)
- Head coach: Bill Foster
- Home arena: Littlejohn Coliseum

1983–84 ACC men's basketball standings
	Conf.				Overall
Team	W		L	PCT	W		L	PCT
No. 1 North Carolina	14	–	0	1.000	28	–	3	.903
No. 11 Maryland †	9	–	5	.643	24	–	8	.750
No. 19 Wake Forest	7	–	7	.500	23	–	9	.719
No. 14 Duke	7	–	7	.500	24	–	10	.706
Georgia Tech	6	–	8	.429	18	–	11	.621
Virginia	6	–	8	.429	21	–	12	.636
NC State	4	–	10	.286	19	–	14	.576
Clemson	3	–	11	.214	14	–	14	.500
† 1984 ACC tournament winner Rankings from AP Poll

Date	Opponent	Site	Result
November 26*	Wagner	Littlejohn Coliseum • Clemson, SC	W 105–55
November 29*	Marquette	Littlejohn Coliseum • Clemson, SC (IPTAY Tournament Semifinal)	W 66–61 (OT)
November 30*	Furman	Littlejohn Coliseum • Clemson, SC (IPTAY Tournament Final)	W 71–67
December 3*	South Carolina	Littlejohn Coliseum • Clemson, SC	W 72–71
December 10*	The Citadel	Littlejohn Coliseum • Clemson, SC	W 92–70
December 17*	at Vanderbilt	Memorial Gymnasium • Nashville, TN	W 70–62
December 19*	Baylor	Littlejohn Coliseum • Clemson, SC	W 102–52
December 28*	at UNLV	Thomas & Mack Center • Las Vegas, NV	L 55–69
December 30*	vs. Marshall	Las Vegas, NV	L 61–63
January 4*	St. Francis (NY)	Littlejohn Coliseum • Clemson, SC	W 97–63
January 9	#12 NC State	Littlejohn Coliseum • Clemson, SC	W 63–61
January 11	Georgia Tech	Littlejohn Coliseum • Clemson, SC	W 79–69
January 14*	Baptist	Littlejohn Coliseum • Clemson, SC	W 71–59
January 17	at #7 Maryland	Cole Field House • College Park, MD	L 72–85
January 21	Virginia	Littlejohn Coliseum • Clemson, SC	L 73–74
January 26	at Georgia Tech	Alexander Memorial Coliseum • Atlanta, GA	L 52–59
January 28	Duke	Littlejohn Coliseum • Clemson, SC	L 65–67
February 1	at #1 North Carolina	Greensboro Coliseum • Greensboro, NC	L 75–97
February 4	#15 Wake Forest	Littlejohn Coliseum • Clemson, SC	L 72–76 (OT)
February 8	at NC State	Reynolds Coliseum • Raleigh, NC	L 59–69
February 11*	at South Carolina	Carolina Coliseum • Columbia, SC	W 61–59
February 15	at #13 Wake Forest	Greensboro Coliseum • Greensboro, NC	L 57–68
February 18	Maryland	Littlejohn Coliseum • Clemson, SC	L 65–66 (3OT)
February 21	at Virginia	University Hall • Charlottesville, VA	L 70–77
February 26	#1 North Carolina	Littlejohn Coliseum • Clemson, SC	L 71–82
February 29	at #15 Duke	Cameron Indoor Stadium • Durham, NC	W 77–76
March 3*	Campbell	Littlejohn Coliseum • Clemson, SC	W 62–52
March 9*	vs. #1 North Carolina	Greensboro Coliseum • Greensboro, NC (ACC Tournament Quarterfinal)	L 66–78
*Non-Conference Game. #Rankings from AP Poll released prior to game.

== 1984–85 ==
1984–85 Clemson Tigers men's basketball

IPTAY Tournament champions Music City Tournament champions

NIT, First Round
- Conference: Atlantic Coast Conference
- Record: 16–13 (5–9 ACC)
- Head coach: Cliff Ellis
- Home arena: Littlejohn Coliseum

1984–85 ACC men's basketball standings
	Conf.				Overall
Team	W		L	PCT	W		L	PCT
No. 6 Georgia Tech †	9	–	5	.643	27	–	8	.771
No. 7 North Carolina	9	–	5	.643	27	–	9	.750
No. 16 NC State	9	–	5	.643	23	–	10	.697
No. 10 Duke	8	–	6	.571	23	–	8	.742
Maryland	8	–	6	.571	25	–	12	.676
Clemson	5	–	9	.357	16	–	13	.552
Wake Forest	5	–	9	.357	15	–	14	.517
Virginia	3	–	11	.214	17	–	16	.515
† 1985 ACC tournament winner Rankings from AP Poll

Date	Opponent	Site	Result
November 26*	Tennessee Tech	Littlejohn Coliseum • Clemson, SC	L 67–68 (OT)
November 30*	Campbell	Littlejohn Coliseum • Clemson, SC (IPTAY Tournament Semifinal)	W 90–55
December 1*	South Alabama	Littlejohn Coliseum • Clemson, SC (IPTAY Tournament Final)	W 79–69
December 5*	at South Carolina	Carolina Coliseum • Columbia, SC	L 66–71
December 8*	Augusta	Littlejohn Coliseum • Clemson, SC	W 89–62
December 15*	Middle Tennessee	Littlejohn Coliseum • Clemson, SC	W 81–75
December 19*	at Furman	Alley Gymnasium • Greenville, SC	W 55–53 (OT)
December 28*	vs. Massachusetts	Memorial Gymnasium • Nashville, TN (Music City Tournament)	W 86–72
December 29*	vs. Vanderbilt	Memorial Gymnasium • Nashville, TN (Music City Tournament)	W 81–74
January 2*	Appalachian State	Littlejohn Coliseum • Clemson, SC	W 84–77
January 8	at #8 Georgia Tech	Alexander Memorial Coliseum • Atlanta, GA	W 90–81
January 10	NC State	Littlejohn Coliseum • Clemson, SC	L 68–71
January 12	at Wake Forest	Winston–Salem Memorial Coliseum • Winston-Salem, NC	L 61–83
January 16	at Maryland	Cole Field House • College Park, MD	L 84–94
January 19	Virginia	Littlejohn Coliseum • Clemson, SC	W 82–62
January 23	#16 Georgia Tech	Littlejohn Coliseum • Clemson, SC	L 59–64
January 26	#5 Duke	Littlejohn Coliseum • Clemson, SC	L 83–100
January 30	#11 North Carolina	Littlejohn Coliseum • Clemson, SC	W 52–50
February 2*	Delaware State	Littlejohn Coliseum • Clemson, SC	W 96–65
February 6	at NC State	Reynolds Coliseum • Raleigh, NC	L 57–69
February 9*	South Carolina	Littlejohn Coliseum • Clemson, SC	W 98–81
February 13	Wake Forest	Littlejohn Coliseum • Clemson, SC	W 80–65
February 17	#10 Maryland	Littlejohn Coliseum • Clemson, SC	W 71–64
February 20	at Virginia	University Hall • Charlottesville, VA	L 66–69
February 23	at #13 North Carolina	Carmichael Auditorium • Chapel Hill, NC	L 50–84
February 27	at #6 Duke	Cameron Indoor Stadium • Durham, NC	L 73–90
March 2*	Winthrop	Littlejohn Coliseum • Clemson, SC	W 100–55
March 8*	vs. #18 NC State	Omni Coliseum • Atlanta, GA (ACC Tournament Quarterfinal)	L 63–70
March 15*	at Tennessee–Chattanooga	McKenzie Arena • Chattanooga, TN (NIT First Round)	L 65–67
*Non-Conference Game. #Rankings from AP Poll released prior to game.

== 1985–86 ==
1985–86 Clemson Tigers men's basketball

IPTAY Tournament champions

NIT, Third Round
- Conference: Atlantic Coast Conference
- Record: 19–15 (3–11 ACC)
- Head coach: Cliff Ellis
- Home arena: Littlejohn Coliseum

1985–86 ACC men's basketball standings
	Conf.				Overall
Team	W		L	PCT	W		L	PCT
No. 1 Duke†	12	–	2	.857	37	–	3	.925
No. 6 Georgia Tech	11	–	3	.786	27	–	7	.794
No. 8 North Carolina	10	–	4	.714	28	–	6	.824
NC State	7	–	7	.500	21	–	13	.618
Virginia	7	–	7	.500	19	–	11	.633
Maryland	6	–	8	.429	19	–	14	.576
Clemson	3	–	11	.214	19	–	15	.559
Wake Forest	0	–	14	.000	8	–	21	.276
† 1986 ACC tournament winner Rankings from AP Poll

Date	Opponent	Site	Result
November 25*	Maryland–Eastern Shore	Littlejohn Coliseum • Clemson, SC	W 83–57
November 29*	East Tennessee St.	Littlejohn Coliseum • Clemson, SC (IPTAY Tournament Semifinal)	W 92–67
November 30*	South Bulls	Littlejohn Coliseum • Clemson, SC (IPTAY Tournament Final)	W 70–60
December 2*	Rider	Littlejohn Coliseum • Clemson, SC	W 101–63
December 4*	Morgan State	Littlejohn Coliseum • Clemson, SC	W 79–36
December 7*	South Carolina	Littlejohn Coliseum • Clemson, SC	W 73–66 (OT)
December 14*	Bethune-Cookman	Littlejohn Coliseum • Clemson, SC	W 87–60
December 16*	Baptist	Littlejohn Coliseum • Clemson, SC	W 89–63
December 18*	Georgia State	Littlejohn Coliseum • Clemson, SC	W 100–60
December 21*	at Texas Tech	City Bank Coliseum • Lubbock, TX	W 65–64
December 28*	vs. Bradley	Neal S. Blaisdell Center • Honolulu, HI (Rainbow Classic Quarterfinal)	W 81–76
December 29*	vs. Missouri	Neal S. Blaisdell Center • Honolulu, HI (Rainbow Classic Semifinal)	L 64–69
December 30*	vs. Seton Hall	Neal S. Blaisdell Center • Honolulu, HI (Rainbow Classic 3rd place game)	W 69–62
January 6	Wake Forest	Littlejohn Coliseum • Clemson, SC	W 91–64
January 11	Virginia	Littlejohn Coliseum • Clemson, SC	L 81–83
January 13	at NC State	Reynolds Coliseum • Raleigh, NC	L 57–60
January 15	#5 Georgia Tech	Littlejohn Coliseum • Clemson, SC	L 71–83
January 23*	at South Carolina	Carolina Coliseum • Columbia, SC	L 64–65
January 25	at Wake Forest	Winston–Salem Memorial Coliseum • Winston-Salem, NC	W 46–43
January 29	at #5 Duke	Cameron Indoor Stadium • Durham, NC	L 78–89
February 1	at #1 North Carolina	Dean Smith Center • Chapel Hill, NC	L 67–85
February 5	NC State	Littlejohn Coliseum • Clemson, SC	L 69–73 (OT)
February 8	at Maryland	Cole Field House • College Park, MD	L 69–78
February 12	#1 North Carolina	Littlejohn Coliseum • Clemson, SC	L 64–79
February 13*	Florida A&M	Littlejohn Coliseum • Clemson, SC	W 96–52
February 15	Maryland	Littlejohn Coliseum • Clemson, SC	W 70–60
February 17*	Furman	Littlejohn Coliseum • Clemson, SC	W 75–57
February 22	at Virginia	University Hall • Charlottesville, VA	L 69–82
February 26	#1 Duke	Littlejohn Coliseum • Clemson, SC	L 69–77
March 2	at #4 Georgia Tech	Alexander Memorial Coliseum • Atlanta, GA	L 63–74
March 7*	vs. #6 Georgia Tech	Greensboro Coliseum • Greensboro, NC (ACC Tournament Quarterfinal)	L 61–79
March 13*	Middle Tennessee	Littlejohn Coliseum • Clemson, SC (NIT First Round)	W 99–81
March 17*	Georgia	Littlejohn Coliseum • Clemson, SC (NIT Second Round)	W 77–65
March 20*	Wyoming	Arena-Auditorium • Laramie, WY (NIT Third Round)	L 57–62
*Non-Conference Game. #Rankings from AP Poll released prior to game.

== 1986–87 ==
1986–87 Clemson Tigers men's basketball

IPTAY Tournament champions TCBY Arkansas–Little Rock Classic champions Hawaii Pacific Tournament champions

NCAA tournament, First Round
- Conference: Atlantic Coast Conference

Ranking
- Coaches: No. 15
- AP: No. 13
- Record: 25–6 (10–4 ACC)
- Head coach: Cliff Ellis
- Home arena: Littlejohn Coliseum

1986–87 ACC men's basketball standings
	Conf.				Overall
Team	W		L	PCT	W		L	PCT
No. 2 North Carolina	14	–	0	1.000	32	–	4	.889
No. 13 Clemson	10	–	4	.714	25	–	6	.806
No. 17 Duke	9	–	5	.643	24	–	9	.727
Virginia	8	–	6	.571	21	–	10	.677
Georgia Tech	7	–	7	.500	16	–	13	.552
NC State †	6	–	8	.429	20	–	14	.588
Wake Forest	2	–	12	.143	14	–	15	.483
Maryland	0	–	14	.000	9	–	17	.346
† 1987 ACC tournament winner Rankings from AP Poll

Date	Opponent	Rank^{#}	Site	Result
November 28*	Georgia State		Littlejohn Coliseum • Clemson, SC (IPTAY Tournament Semifinal)	W 108–91
November 29*	Boston University		Littlejohn Coliseum • Clemson, SC (IPTAY Tournament Final)	W 92–77
December 3*	UNC–Asheville		Littlejohn Coliseum • Clemson, SC	W 89–58
December 6*	Texas Tech		Littlejohn Coliseum • Clemson, SC	W 86–72
December 14*	at South Carolina		Carolina Coliseum • Columbia, SC	W 71–65
December 16*	Prairie View A&M		Littlejohn Coliseum • Clemson, SC	W 103–45
December 17*	Armstrong State		Littlejohn Coliseum • Clemson, SC	W 112–39
December 29*	vs. Delaware State		Barton Coliseum • Little Rock, AR (TCBY Arkansas–Little Rock Classic Semifinal)	W 95–42
December 30*	vs. Arkansas–Little Rock		Barton Coliseum • Little Rock, AR (TCBY Arkansas–Little Rock Classic Final)	W 76–44
January 2*	vs. Fordham		Honolulu, HI (Hawaii Pacific Tournament Semifinal)	W 90–86
January 3*	vs. Hawaii Pacific		Honolulu, HI (Hawaii Pacific Tournament Final)	W 93–74
January 7	#18 NC State	#20	Littlejohn Coliseum • Clemson, SC	W 73–69
January 10	at Wake Forest	#20	Winston–Salem Memorial Coliseum • Winston-Salem, NC	W 91–88 (OT)
January 12*	Florida International	#12	Littlejohn Coliseum • Clemson, SC	W 108–55
January 14*	Furman	#12	Littlejohn Coliseum • Clemson, SC	W 94–77
January 17	Maryland	#12	Littlejohn Coliseum • Clemson, SC	W 72–64
January 20	at Georgia Tech	#10	Alexander Memorial Coliseum • Atlanta, GA	W 67–66
January 24	#12 Duke	#10	Littlejohn Coliseum • Clemson, SC	L 103–105 (OT)
January 26*	Winthrop	#14	Littlejohn Coliseum • Clemson, SC	W 96–69
January 28	#1 North Carolina	#14	Littlejohn Coliseum • Clemson, SC	L 99–108
January 31	Virginia	#14	Littlejohn Coliseum • Clemson, SC	W 89–83
February 4	at Maryland	#12	Cole Field House • College Park, MD	W 80–79
February 7*	South Carolina	#12	Littlejohn Coliseum • Clemson, SC	W 74–52
February 11	at NC State	#12	Reynolds Coliseum • Raleigh, NC	W 78–75
February 14	at Virginia	#12	University Hall • Charlottesville, VA	W 94–90 (OT)
February 18	Wake Forest	#10	Littlejohn Coliseum • Clemson, SC	W 87–71
February 21	at #3 North Carolina	#10	Dean Smith Center • Chapel Hill, NC	L 80–96
February 25	Georgia Tech	#13	Littlejohn Coliseum • Clemson, SC	W 88–77
February 28	at #17 Duke	#13	Cameron Indoor Stadium • Durham, NC	L 59–65
March 6*	vs. Wake Forest	#13	Capital Centre • Landover, MD (ACC Tournament Quarterfinal)	L 62–69
March 13*	vs. Southwest Missouri St.	#13	Omni Coliseum • Atlanta, GA (NCAA First Round)	L 60–65
*Non-Conference Game. #Rankings from AP Poll released prior to game.

== 1987–88 ==
1987–88 Clemson Tigers men's basketball

NIT, First Round
- Conference: Atlantic Coast Conference
- Record: 14–15 (4–10 ACC)
- Head coach: Cliff Ellis
- Home arena: Littlejohn Coliseum

1987–88 ACC men's basketball standings
	Conf.				Overall
Team	W		L	PCT	W		L	PCT
No. 7 North Carolina	11	–	3	.786	27	–	7	.794
No. 14 NC State	10	–	4	.714	24	–	8	.750
No. 5 Duke †	9	–	5	.643	28	–	7	.800
Georgia Tech	8	–	6	.571	22	–	10	.688
Maryland	6	–	8	.429	18	–	13	.581
Virginia	5	–	9	.357	13	–	18	.419
Clemson	4	–	10	.286	14	–	15	.483
Wake Forest	3	–	11	.214	10	–	18	.357
† 1988 ACC tournament winner Rankings from AP Poll

Date	Opponent	Site	Result
November 27*	Oregon State	Chinese Culture and Sports Center • Taipei, Taiwan	W 69–54
November 30*	Baptist	Littlejohn Coliseum • Clemson, SC	W 81–60
December 2*	Towson State	Littlejohn Coliseum • Clemson, SC	W 71–61
December 5*	Mercer	Littlejohn Coliseum • Clemson, SC	W 103–68
December 12*	Coastal Carolina	Littlejohn Coliseum • Clemson, SC	W 76–57
December 15*	Southern Miss	Littlejohn Coliseum • Clemson, SC	L 85–88
December 16*	Augusta	Littlejohn Coliseum • Clemson, SC	W 91–45
December 28*	vs. Michigan	USF Sun Dome • Tampa, FL (South Florida Invitational Semifinal)	L 88–93
December 29*	vs. Florida International	USF Sun Dome • Tampa, FL (South Florida Invitational Consolation)	W 98–47
January 6	at NC State	Reynolds Coliseum • Raleigh, NC	L 61–70
January 9	at Maryland	Cole Field House • College Park, MD	L 53–68
January 10	at Virginia	University Hall • Charlottesville, VA	L 75–77
January 13*	Rider	Littlejohn Coliseum • Clemson, SC	W 83–48
January 16	Wake Forest	Littlejohn Coliseum • Clemson, SC	W 75–62
January 20*	Furman	Littlejohn Coliseum • Clemson, SC	W 76–65
January 23*	South Carolina	Littlejohn Coliseum • Clemson, SC	W 69–65
January 26	at Georgia Tech	Alexander Memorial Coliseum • Atlanta, GA	L 76–85
February 1	at #5 Duke	Cameron Indoor Stadium • Durham, NC	L 63–101
February 4	#8 North Carolina	Littlejohn Coliseum • Clemson, SC	L 64–88
February 6*	at South Carolina	Carolina Coliseum • Columbia, SC	L 63–75
February 10	Maryland	Littlejohn Coliseum • Clemson, SC	L 66–70
February 18	NC State	Littlejohn Coliseum • Clemson, SC	L 63–88
February 21	Virginia	Littlejohn Coliseum • Clemson, SC	W 65–62
February 24	at Wake Forest	Greensboro Coliseum • Greensboro, NC	L 73–79
February 28	at #9 North Carolina	Dean Smith Center • Chapel Hill, NC	L 52–88
March 2	#9 Duke	Littlejohn Coliseum • Clemson, SC	W 79–77
March 5	#13 Georgia Tech	Littlejohn Coliseum • Clemson, SC	W 97–94 (2OT)
March 11*	vs. #11 NC State	Greensboro Coliseum • Greensboro, NC (ACC Tournament Quarterfinal)	L 72–79
March 18*	at Southern Miss	Reed Green Coliseum • Hattiesburg, MS (NIT First Round)	L 69–74
*Non-Conference Game. #Rankings from AP Poll released prior to game.

== 1988–89 ==
1988–89 Clemson Tigers men's basketball

NCAA tournament, Second Round
- Conference: Atlantic Coast Conference
- Record: 19–11 (7–7 ACC)
- Head coach: Cliff Ellis
- Home arena: Littlejohn Coliseum

1988–89 ACC men's basketball standings
	Conf.				Overall
Team	W		L	PCT	W		L	PCT
No. 19 NC State	10	–	4	.714	22	–	9	.710
No. 9 Duke	9	–	5	.643	28	–	8	.778
Virginia	9	–	5	.643	22	–	11	.667
No. 5 North Carolina †	9	–	5	.643	29	–	8	.784
Georgia Tech	8	–	6	.571	20	–	12	.625
Clemson	7	–	7	.500	19	–	11	.633
Wake Forest	3	–	11	.214	13	–	15	.464
Maryland	1	–	13	.071	9	–	20	.310
† 1989 ACC tournament winner Rankings from AP Poll

Date	Opponent	Site	Result
November 28*	The Citadel	Littlejohn Coliseum • Clemson, SC	W 96–82
December 1*	at Furman	Alley Gymnasium • Greenville, SC	W 79–64
December 3*	at South Carolina	Carolina Coliseum • Columbia, SC	L 70–90
December 10*	Wagner	Littlejohn Coliseum • Clemson, SC	W 79–36
December 13*	South Carolina State	Littlejohn Coliseum • Clemson, SC	W 93–70
December 17*	at Hofstra	Physical Fitness Center • Hempstead, NY	W 77–63
December 27*	vs. Middle Tennessee	Memorial Coliseum • Portland, OR (Far West Classic Quarterfinal)	W 81–77
December 29*	vs. Oregon	Memorial Coliseum • Portland, OR (Far West Classic Semifinal)	W 74–61
December 30*	vs. Oregon State	Memorial Coliseum • Portland, OR (Far West Classic Final)	L 58–72
January 5	#16 NC State	Littlejohn Coliseum • Clemson, SC	L 65–73
January 7	Maryland	Littlejohn Coliseum • Clemson, SC	W 75–58
January 11	Virginia	Littlejohn Coliseum • Clemson, SC	W 88–70
January 14	at Wake Forest	Winston–Salem Memorial Coliseum • Winston-Salem, NC	W 75–71
January 18*	Youngstown State	Littlejohn Coliseum • Clemson, SC	W 104–74
January 21*	Western Carolina	Littlejohn Coliseum • Clemson, SC	W 77–60
January 25	at #22 Georgia Tech	Alexander Memorial Coliseum • Atlanta, GA	L 74–75
January 29	at #8 Duke	Cameron Indoor Stadium • Durham, NC	L 62–92
February 1	#8 North Carolina	Littlejohn Coliseum • Clemson, SC	W 85–82
February 4*	South Carolina	Littlejohn Coliseum • Clemson, SC	W 78–65
February 7	at Maryland	Cole Field House • College Park, MD	L 87–98
February 11*	Liberty	Littlejohn Coliseum • Clemson, SC	W 96–71
February 15	at #19 NC State	Reynolds Coliseum • Raleigh, NC	L 75–90
February 18	at Virginia	University Hall • Charlottesville, VA	L 83–85
February 22	Wake Forest	Littlejohn Coliseum • Clemson, SC	W 94–83
February 25	at #5 North Carolina	Dean Smith Center • Chapel Hill, NC	L 86–100
March 1	#9 Duke	Littlejohn Coliseum • Clemson, SC	W 79–74
March 4	#25 Georgia Tech	Littlejohn Coliseum • Clemson, SC	W 81–79 (OT)
March 10*	vs. Virginia	Omni Coliseum • Atlanta, GA (ACC Tournament Quarterfinal)	L 73–90
March 16*	vs. #22 Saint Mary's	BSU Pavilion • Boise, ID (NCAA First Round)	W 83–70
March 18*	vs. #1 Arizona	BSU Pavilion • Boise, ID (NCAA Second Round)	L 68–94
*Non-Conference Game. #Rankings from AP Poll released prior to game.
