= 1983–84 NC State Wolfpack men's basketball team =

American college basketball season

1983–84 NC State Wolfpack men's basketball

Great Alaska Shootout Champions

NIT, First Round
- Conference: Atlantic Coast Conference
- Record: 19–14 (4–10 ACC)
- Head coach: Jim Valvano (4th season)
- Assistant coaches: Ray Martin (4th season); Tom Abatemarco (2nd season); Ed McLean (2nd season)
- Home arena: Reynolds Coliseum

1983–84 ACC men's basketball standings
	Conf.				Overall
Team	W		L	PCT	W		L	PCT
No. 1 North Carolina	14	–	0	1.000	28	–	3	.903
No. 11 Maryland †	9	–	5	.643	24	–	8	.750
No. 19 Wake Forest	7	–	7	.500	23	–	9	.719
No. 14 Duke	7	–	7	.500	24	–	10	.706
Georgia Tech	6	–	8	.429	18	–	11	.621
Virginia	6	–	8	.429	21	–	12	.636
NC State	4	–	10	.286	19	–	14	.576
Clemson	3	–	11	.214	14	–	14	.500
† 1984 ACC tournament winner Rankings from AP Poll

The 1983–84 NC State Wolfpack men's basketball team represented North Carolina State University during the 1983–84 men's college basketball season. It was Jim Valvano's fourth season as head coach.

Coming off the 1983 National Championship, the 1983–84 season was a rollercoaster. The Wolfpack had four streaks of 5+ games (2 winning streaks, 2 losing streaks), including a 7-game losing skid to end the season. NC State finished with a record of 19–14 (4–10 ACC).

== Roster ==
1983–84 NC State Wolfpack men's basketball team
Players
Coaches

Pos.	#	Name	Height	Weight	Year	Hometown
F	33	Alvin Battle	6 ft 7 in (2.01 m)	223 lb (101 kg)	Sr	Rocky Mount, NC
F	23	Bennie Bolton	6 ft 7 in (2.01 m)	200 lb (91 kg)	Fr	Washington, DC
F	34	Rodney Butts	6 ft 7 in (2.01 m)	205 lb (93 kg)	Fr	College Park, GA
F	43	Lorenzo Charles	6 ft 7 in (2.01 m)	225 lb (102 kg)	Jr	Brooklyn, NY
F	40	Walt Densmore	6 ft 6 in (1.98 m)	203 lb (92 kg)	So	Tuscaloosa, AL
F	10	Tommy DiNardo (W)	6 ft 5 in (1.96 m)	195 lb (88 kg)	Sr	Jamesville, NC
G	24	Terry Gannon	6 ft 0 in (1.83 m)	161 lb (73 kg)	Jr	Joliet, IL
G	12	George McClain	6 ft 0 in (1.83 m)	175 lb (79 kg)	So	Rocky Mount, NC
F	45	Cozell McQueen	6 ft 11 in (2.11 m)	215 lb (98 kg)	Jr	Bennettsville, SC
G	31	Ernie Myers	6 ft 4 in (1.93 m)	203 lb (92 kg)	So	Manhattan, NY
F	15	Walter Proctor	6 ft 8 in (2.03 m)	220 lb (100 kg)	Jr	Somerset, NJ
C	50	Terry Shackleford	6 ft 10 in (2.08 m)	215 lb (98 kg)	Fr	Denton, NC
F	30	Harold Thompson	6 ft 5 in (1.96 m)	212 lb (96 kg)	Sr	Raeford, NC
F	42	Mike Warren	6 ft 7 in (2.01 m)	177 lb (80 kg)	Jr	Raleigh, NC
G	22	Spud Webb	5 ft 6 in (1.68 m)	132 lb (60 kg)	Jr	Dallas, TX

Head coach

- Jim Valvano (Rutgers)

Assistant coach(es)

- Ray Martin (Notre Dame)
- Tom Abatemarco (Dowling)
- Ed McLean (Western Carolina)

Legend

- (C) Team captain
- (S) Suspended
- (I) Ineligible
- (W) Walk-on
- Injured
- Current redshirt

== Schedule and results ==
Date time, TV	Rank^{#}	Opponent^{#}	Result	Record	Site city, state
Non-conference regular season
November 19*		No. 3 Houston; Hall of Fame Classic	W 76–64	1–0	Springfield Civic Center; Springfield, MA
Nov 25, 1983		at Alaska-Anchorage; Great Alaska Shootout	W 68–60	2–0	Sullivan Arena; Anchorage, Alaska
Nov 26, 1983*		vs. Santa Clara; Great Alaska Shootout	W 78–75	3–0	Sullivan Arena; Anchorage, Alaska
Nov 27, 1983*		vs. No. 14 Arkansas; Great Alaska Shootout	W 65–60	4–0	Sullivan Arena; Anchorage, Alaska
Dec 2, 1983*	No. 7	vs. Charlotte	W 79–60	5–0	
Dec 3, 1983*	No. 7	vs. Virginia Tech	L 65–89	5–1	
Dec 7, 1983*	No. 8	Western Carolina	W 82–61	6–1	Reynolds Coliseum; Raleigh, North Carolina
Dec 10, 1983*	No. 8	Hofstra	W 82–56	7–1	Reynolds Coliseum; Raleigh, North Carolina
Dec 17, 1983*	No. 6	No. 16 Louisville	L 79–83	7–2	Reynolds Coliseum; Raleigh, North Carolina
Dec 20, 1983*	No. 13	North Carolina A&T	W 84–71	8–2	Reynolds Coliseum; Raleigh, North Carolina
Dec 28, 1983*	No. 13	Towson	W 88–49	9–2	Reynolds Coliseum; Raleigh, North Carolina
Dec 30, 1983*	No. 13	Campbell	W 80–65	10–2	Reynolds Coliseum; Raleigh, North Carolina
ACC Regular Season
Jan 4, 1984	No. 12	No. 5 Maryland	L 55–59	10–3 (0–1)	Reynolds Coliseum; Raleigh, North Carolina
Jan 7, 1984	No. 12	No. 1 North Carolina	L 60–81	10–4 (0–2)	Reynolds Coliseum; Raleigh, North Carolina
Jan 9, 1984		at Clemson	L 61–63	10–5 (0–3)	Littlejohn Coliseum; Clemson, South Carolina
Jan 11, 1984		at Virginia	L 54–57	10–6 (0–4)	University Hall; Charlottesville, Virginia
Jan 15, 1984		at Georgia Tech	L 47–56	10–7 (0–5)	Alexander Memorial Coliseum; Atlanta, Georgia
Jan 18, 1984*		UNC Wilmington	W 81–53	11–7	Reynolds Coliseum; Raleigh, North Carolina
Jan 21, 1984		No. 12 Wake Forest	W 80–69	12–7 (1–5)	Reynolds Coliseum; Raleigh, North Carolina
Jan 26, 1984		at Duke	W 79–76	13–7 (2–5)	Cameron Indoor Stadium; Durham, North Carolina
Jan 30, 1984*		Missouri	W 66–53	14–7	Reynolds Coliseum; Raleigh, North Carolina
Feb 3, 1984*		vs. The Citadel	W 50–49	15–7	
Feb 4, 1984*		vs. Furman	W 95–72	16–7	
Feb 8, 1984		Clemson	W 69–59	17–7 (3–5)	Reynolds Coliseum; Raleigh, North Carolina
Feb 12, 1984		No. 18 Georgia Tech	W 68–67	18–7 (4–5)	Reynolds Coliseum; Raleigh, North Carolina
Feb 15, 1984*		Northeastern	W 77–74	19–7	Reynolds Coliseum; Raleigh, North Carolina
Feb 18, 1984		at No. 1 North Carolina	L 71–95	19–8 (4–6)	Carmichael Auditorium; Chapel Hill, North Carolina
Feb 23, 1984		No. 14 Duke	L 70–73 ^{OT}	19–9 (4–7)	Reynolds Coliseum; Raleigh, North Carolina
Feb 25, 1984		Virginia	L 63–74	19–10 (4–8)	Reynolds Coliseum; Raleigh, North Carolina
Feb 29, 1984		at No. 19 Maryland	L 50–63	19–11 (4–9)	Cole Fieldhouse; College Park, Maryland
Mar 3, 1984		at No. 17 Wake Forest	L 75–84	19–12 (4–10)	Winston-Salem Memorial Coliseum; Winston-Salem, North Carolina
ACC Tournament
March 9*		vs. No. 14 Maryland; ACC tournament Quarterfinal	L 63–69	19–13	Greensboro Coliseum; Greensboro, NC
National Invitation Tournament
March 15*		Florida State; NIT First Round	L 71–74	19–14	Reynolds Coliseum; Raleigh, NC
*Non-conference game. ^{#}Rankings from AP Poll. (#) Tournament seedings in parentheses.

== Rankings ==
Ranking movements Legend: ██ Increase in ranking ██ Decrease in ranking — = Not ranked
	Week																	
Poll	Pre	1	2	3	4	5	6	7	8	9	10	11	12	13	14	15	16	Final
AP	—	7	8	6	13	13	12	—	—	—	—	—	—	—	—	—	—	—
Coaches	Not released		13	6	18	17	12	—	—	—	—	—	—	—	—	—	—	—
