= 1983–84 Georgia Tech Yellow Jackets men's basketball team =

American college basketball season

1983–84 Georgia Tech Yellow Jackets men's basketball

National Invitation Tournament
- Conference: Atlantic Coast Conference
- Record: 18–11 (6–8 ACC)
- Head coach: Bobby Cremins (3rd season)
- Assistant coaches: George Felton (3rd season); Perry Clark (2nd season); Jimmy Hebron (3rd season)
- Home arena: Alexander Memorial Coliseum

1983–84 ACC men's basketball standings
	Conf.				Overall
Team	W		L	PCT	W		L	PCT
No. 1 North Carolina	14	–	0	1.000	28	–	3	.903
No. 11 Maryland †	9	–	5	.643	24	–	8	.750
No. 19 Wake Forest	7	–	7	.500	23	–	9	.719
No. 14 Duke	7	–	7	.500	24	–	10	.706
Georgia Tech	6	–	8	.429	18	–	11	.621
Virginia	6	–	8	.429	21	–	12	.636
NC State	4	–	10	.286	19	–	14	.576
Clemson	3	–	11	.214	14	–	14	.500
† 1984 ACC tournament winner Rankings from AP Poll

The 1983–84 Georgia Tech Yellow Jackets men's basketball team represented the Georgia Institute of Technology. Led by head coach Bobby Cremins, the team finished the season with an overall record of 18–11 (6–8 ACC).

== Roster ==
1983–84 Georgia Tech Yellow Jackets men's basketball team
Players
Coaches

Pos.	#	Name	Height	Weight	Year	Hometown
G	30	Anthony Byrd	6 ft 2 in (1.88 m)	180 lb (82 kg)	Sr	Apex, North Carolina
G	45	Bruce Dalrymple	6 ft 4 in (1.93 m)	190 lb (86 kg)	Fr	Manhattan, New York
G	20	Scott Gardner	6 ft 4 in (1.93 m)	180 lb (82 kg)	So	Greenville, South Carolina
C	44	Tim Harvey	6 ft 10 in (2.08 m)	225 lb (102 kg)	Sr	Plainfield, New Jersey
C	54	Yvon Joseph	6 ft 11 in (2.11 m)	245 lb (111 kg)	Jr	Cap-Haïtien, Haiti
F	34	Jack Mansell	6 ft 7 in (2.01 m)	220 lb (100 kg)	So	Sharon, Pennsylvania
G	10	Craig Neal	6 ft 5 in (1.96 m)	165 lb (75 kg)	Fr	Washington, Indiana
F	24	Scott Petway	6 ft 6 in (1.98 m)	210 lb (95 kg)	Jr	Chicago, Illinois
G	25	Mark Price	6 ft 0 in (1.83 m)	165 lb (75 kg)	So	Enid, Oklahoma
C	22	John Salley	6 ft 9 in (2.06 m)	215 lb (98 kg)	So	Brooklyn, New York
F	43	Greg Wilson	6 ft 8 in (2.03 m)	220 lb (100 kg)	Sr	Grand Ridge, Florida

Head coach

- Bobby Cremins (South Carolina)

Assistant coach(es)

- George Felton (South Carolina)
- Perry Clark (Gettysburg)
- Jimmy Hebron

Legend

- (C) Team captain
- (S) Suspended
- (I) Ineligible
- (W) Walk-on
- Injured
- Current redshirt

== Schedule and results ==
Date time, TV	Rank^{#}	Opponent^{#}	Result	Record	Site city, state
Regular Season
Jan 7, 1984		No. 8 Wake Forest	W 68–66	10–1 (1–0)	Alexander Memorial Coliseum; Atlanta, Georgia
Jan 9, 1984*		South Carolina State	W 90–65	11–1	Alexander Memorial Coliseum; Atlanta, Georgia
Jan 11, 1984		at Clemson	L 69–79	11–2 (1–1)	Littlejohn Coliseum; Clemson, South Carolina
Jan 15, 1984		NC State	W 56–47	12–2 (2–1)	Alexander Memorial Coliseum; Atlanta, Georgia
Jan 23, 1984		No. 19 Virginia	W 72–71 ^{3OT}	13–2 (3–1)	Alexander Memorial Coliseum (6,645); Atlanta, Georgia
Jan 26, 1984		Clemson	W 59–52	14–2 (4–1)	Alexander Memorial Coliseum; Atlanta, Georgia
Jan 28, 1984		at No. 1 North Carolina	L 61–73	14–3 (4–2)	Carmichael Auditorium; Chapel Hill, North Carolina
Jan 30, 1984		Duke	L 68–69	14–4 (4–3)	Alexander Memorial Coliseum; Atlanta, Georgia
Feb 2, 1984	No. 18	at No. 15 Wake Forest	L 74–78	14–5 (4–4)	Winston-Salem Memorial Coliseum; Winston-Salem, North Carolina
Feb 4, 1984	No. 18	No. 10 Maryland	W 71–70	15–5 (5–4)	Alexander Memorial Coliseum; Atlanta, Georgia
Feb 7, 1984	No. 18	at Virginia	L 59–91	15–6 (5–5)	University Hall (9,000); Charlottesville, Virginia
Feb 12, 1984		at NC State	L 67–68	15–7 (5–6)	Reynolds Coliseum; Raleigh, North Carolina
Feb 16, 1984*		South Carolina	W 68–50	16–7	Alexander Memorial Coliseum; Atlanta, Georgia
Feb 20, 1984*		Maryland Eastern Shore	W 70–61	17–7	Alexander Memorial Coliseum; Atlanta, Georgia
Feb 23, 1984		at Maryland	L 74–79	17–8 (5–7)	Cole Field House; College Park, Maryland
Feb 25, 1984		at No. 14 Duke	W 58–56	18–8 (6–7)	Cameron Indoor Stadium; Durham, North Carolina
Feb 29, 1984		No. 1 North Carolina	L 56–69	18–9 (6–8)	Alexander Memorial Coliseum; Atlanta, Georgia
ACC Tournament
Mar 9, 1984*	(5)	vs. (4) No. 16 Duke; Quarterfinals	L 63–67 ^{OT}	18–10	Greensboro Coliseum; Greensboro, North Carolina
National Invitation Tournament
Mar 15, 1984*		at Virginia Tech; First round	L 74–77	18–11	Cassell Coliseum; Blacksburg, Virginia
*Non-conference game. ^{#}Rankings from AP Poll. (#) Tournament seedings in parentheses.
