= 1983–84 Duke Blue Devils men's basketball team =

American college basketball season

1983–84 Duke Blue Devils men's basketball

NCAA tournament, Second Round
- Conference: Atlantic Coast Conference

Ranking
- Coaches: No. 14
- AP: No. 14
- Record: 24–10 (7–7 ACC)
- Head coach: Mike Krzyzewski (4th season)
- Assistant coaches: Chuck Swenson; Bob Bender; Pete Gaudet
- Home arena: Cameron Indoor Stadium

1983–84 ACC men's basketball standings
	Conf.				Overall
Team	W		L	PCT	W		L	PCT
No. 1 North Carolina	14	–	0	1.000	28	–	3	.903
No. 11 Maryland †	9	–	5	.643	24	–	8	.750
No. 19 Wake Forest	7	–	7	.500	23	–	9	.719
No. 14 Duke	7	–	7	.500	24	–	10	.706
Georgia Tech	6	–	8	.429	18	–	11	.621
Virginia	6	–	8	.429	21	–	12	.636
NC State	4	–	10	.286	19	–	14	.576
Clemson	3	–	11	.214	14	–	14	.500
† 1984 ACC tournament winner Rankings from AP Poll

The 1983–84 Duke Blue Devils men's basketball team represented Duke University. The head coach was Mike Krzyzewski and the team finished the season with an overall record of 24–10.

== Roster ==
1983–84 Duke Blue Devils men's basketball team
Players
Coaches

Pos.	#	Name	Height	Weight	Year	Hometown
F	32	Mark Alarie	6 ft 8 in (2.03 m)	220 lb (100 kg)	So	Brophy Prep	Scottsdale, AZ
G	4	Tommy Amaker	6 ft 0 in (1.83 m)	155 lb (70 kg)	Fr	W.T. Woodson	Falls Church, VA
F	44	Todd Anderson	6 ft 9 in (2.06 m)	230 lb (104 kg)	Jr	Armstrong	Golden Valley, MN
F	21	Jay Bilas	6 ft 8 in (2.03 m)	235 lb (107 kg)	So	Rolling Hills	Rolling Hills, CA
F	33	Jay Bryan	6 ft 8 in (2.03 m)	200 lb (91 kg)	Jr	Bear Creek	Lakewood, CO
G	24	Johnny Dawkins	6 ft 2 in (1.88 m)	170 lb (77 kg)	So	Mackin Catholic	Washington, D.C.
G	23	Richard Ford	5 ft 10 in (1.78 m)	160 lb (73 kg)	Sr	Durham	Durham, NC
G/F	12	David Henderson	6 ft 5 in (1.96 m)	195 lb (88 kg)	So	Warren County	Dewry, NC
G	11	Doug McNeely	6 ft 5 in (1.96 m)	200 lb (91 kg)	Sr	Eastwood	El Paso, TX
F	45	Dan Meagher	6 ft 7 in (2.01 m)	215 lb (98 kg)	Jr	Denis Morris	St. Catharines, Ontario
C	51	Martin Nessley	7 ft 2 in (2.18 m)	260 lb (118 kg)	Fr	Whitehall-Yearling	Whitehall, OH
F	40	Weldon Williams	6 ft 6 in (1.98 m)	190 lb (86 kg)	So	Crete-Monee	Park Forest, IL

Head coach

Mike Krzyzewski

Assistant coach(es)

- Chuck Swenson
- Bob Bender
- Pete Gaudet

Legend

- (C) Team captain
- (S) Suspended
- (I) Ineligible
- (W) Walk-on
- Injured
- Current redshirt

Roster

== Schedule ==
Date time, TV	Rank^{#}	Opponent^{#}	Result	Record	Site city, state
Regular season
November 26, 1983*		Vanderbilt	W 78–74	1–0	Cameron Indoor Stadium; Durham, NC
November 30, 1983*		at William & Mary	W 70–68	2–0	Kaplan Arena; Williamsburg, VA
December 3, 1983*		vs. Davidson	W 90–63	3–0	Charlotte, NC; Charlotte Coliseum
December 5, 1983*		South Florida	W 95–66	4–0	Cameron Indoor Stadium; Durham, NC
December 7, 1983*		Ohio	W 82–63	5–0	Cameron Indoor Stadium; Durham, NC
December 10, 1983*		East Carolina	W 80–64	6–0	Cameron Indoor Stadium; Durham, NC
December 12, 1983*		UMass	W 88–56	7–0	Cameron Indoor Stadium; Durham, NC
December 21, 1983*		Colorado	W 79–72	8–0	Cameron Indoor Stadium; Durham, NC
December 28, 1983*		vs. SMU; Rainbow Classic	L 76–78	8–1	Neil S. Blaisdell Center; Honolulu, HI
December 29, 1983*		vs. Pacific; Rainbow Classic	W 68–66	9–1	Neil S. Blaisdell Center; Honolulu, HI
December 30, 1983*		vs. Navy	W 90–79	10–1	Neal S. Blaisdell Center; Honolulu, HI
January 4, 1984*		Loyola, Md.	W 92–68	11–1	Cameron Indoor Stadium; Durham, NC
January 7, 1984		at No. 20 Virginia	W 78–72	12–1 (1–0)	University Hall; Charlottesville, VA
January 9, 1984*		Bucknell	W 84–67	13–1	Cameron Indoor Stadium; Durham, NC
January 11, 1984*		Appalachian State	W 73–60	14–1	Cameron Indoor Stadium; Durham, NC
January 14, 1984		No. 5 Maryland	L 75–81	14–2 (1–1)	Cameron Indoor Stadium; Durham, NC
January 18, 1984		at No. 12 Wake Forest	L 66–97	14–3 (1–2)	Greensboro Coliseum; Greensboro, NC
January 21, 1984		No. 1 North Carolina; Rivalry	L 73–78	14–4 (1–3)	Cameron Indoor Stadium; Durham, NC
January 26, 1984		NC State	L 76–79	14–5 (1–4)	Cameron Indoor Stadium; Durham, NC
January 28, 1984		at Clemson	W 67–65	15–5 (2–4)	Littlejohn Coliseum; Clemson, SC
January 30, 1984		at Georgia Tech	W 69–68	16–5 (3–4)	Alexander Memorial Coliseum; Atlanta, GA
February 4, 1984		Virginia	W 67–64	17–5 (4–4)	Cameron Indoor Stadium; Durham, NC
February 8, 1984*		at Harvard	W 89–86	18–5	Lavietes Pavilion; Boston, MA
February 11, 1984		at No. 13 Maryland	W 89–84	19–5 (5–4)	Cole Field House; College Park, MD
February 15, 1984*	No. 19	at Stetson	W 80–69	20–5	Edmunds Center; DeLand, FL
February 18, 1984	No. 19	No. 13 Wake Forest	W 79–77 ^{OT}	21–5 (6–4)	Cameron Indoor Stadium; Durham, NC
February 23, 1984	No. 14	at NC State	W 73–70 ^{OT}	22–5 (7–4)	Reynolds Coliseum; Raleigh, NC
February 25, 1984	No. 14	Georgia Tech	L 56–58	22–6 (7–5)	Cameron Indoor Stadium; Durham, NC
February 29, 1984	No. 15	Clemson	L 76–77	22–7 (7–6)	Cameron Indoor Stadium; Durham, NC
March 3, 1984	No. 15	at No. 1 North Carolina; Rivalry	L 83–96 ^{2OT}	22–8 (7–7)	Carmichael Auditorium; Chapel Hill, NC
ACC tournament
March 9, 1984	(4) No. 16	vs. (5) Georgia Tech; Quarterfinals	W 67–63 ^{OT}	23–8	Greensboro Coliseum; Greensboro, NC
March 10, 1984	(4) No. 16	vs. (1) No. 1 North Carolina; Semifinals	W 77–75	24–8	Greensboro Coliseum; Greensboro, NC
March 11, 1984	(4) No. 16	vs. (2) No. 14 Maryland; Championship	L 62–74	24–9	Greensboro Coliseum; Greensboro, NC
NCAA tournament
March 18, 1984*	(3) No. 14	vs. (6) No. 15 Washington; Second Round	L 78–80	24–10	Beasley Coliseum; Pullman, WA
*Non-conference game. ^{#}Rankings from AP Poll. (#) Tournament seedings in parentheses. Source: Duke media guide
