= 1983–84 Maryland Terrapins men's basketball team =

American college basketball season

1983–84 Maryland Terrapins men's basketball

1984 ACC Men's Basketball tournament champions

NCAA tournament, Sweet Sixteen
- Conference: Atlantic Coast Conference

Ranking
- Coaches: No. 10
- AP: No. 11
- Record: 24–8 (9–5 ACC)
- Head coach: Lefty Driesell
- Assistant coaches: Sherman Dillard; Mel Cartwright; Ron Bradley
- Home arena: Cole Field House

1983–84 ACC men's basketball standings
	Conf.				Overall
Team	W		L	PCT	W		L	PCT
No. 1 North Carolina	14	–	0	1.000	28	–	3	.903
No. 11 Maryland †	9	–	5	.643	24	–	8	.750
No. 19 Wake Forest	7	–	7	.500	23	–	9	.719
No. 14 Duke	7	–	7	.500	24	–	10	.706
Georgia Tech	6	–	8	.429	18	–	11	.621
Virginia	6	–	8	.429	21	–	12	.636
NC State	4	–	10	.286	19	–	14	.576
Clemson	3	–	11	.214	14	–	14	.500
† 1984 ACC tournament winner Rankings from AP Poll

The 1983–84 Maryland Terrapins men's basketball team represented the University of Maryland in the 1983–1984 college basketball season as a member of the Atlantic Coast Conference (ACC). The team was led by head coach Charles "Lefty" Driesell and played their home games at the Cole Field House. They won the 1984 ACC men's basketball tournament and advanced to the Sweet 16 in the 1984 NCAA basketball tournament.

== Roster ==
1983–84 Maryland Terrapins men's basketball team
Players
Coaches

Pos.	#	Name	Height	Weight	Year	Hometown
G	3	Keith Gatlin	6 ft 5 in (1.96 m)	165 lb (75 kg)	Fr	Grimesland, NC
G	10	Jeff Adkins	6 ft 5 in (1.96 m)	185 lb (84 kg)	Jr	Martinsville, VA
G	11	Chuck Driesell	6 ft 2 in (1.88 m)	170 lb (77 kg)	Jr	Silver Spring, MD
G	12	Jeff Baxter	6 ft 1 in (1.85 m)	165 lb (75 kg)	Jr	Washington, DC
G	14	Steve Rivers	6 ft 3 in (1.91 m)	170 lb (77 kg)	Sr	Uniondale, NY
F	22	Mark Fothergill	6 ft 9 in (2.06 m)	220 lb (100 kg)	Sr	Somerset, KY
F	24	Adrian Branch	6 ft 8 in (2.03 m)	185 lb (84 kg)	Jr	Largo, MD
C	31	Bryan Palmer	6 ft 10 in (2.08 m)	205 lb (93 kg)	So	Glen Rock, PA
F	32	Terry Long	6 ft 8 in (2.03 m)	240 lb (109 kg)	Fr	Glen Allen, VA
F	33	Pete Hobert	6 ft 6 in (1.98 m)	190 lb (86 kg)	Sr	Fairfax, VA
F	34	Len Bias	6 ft 8 in (2.03 m)	195 lb (88 kg)	So	Landover, MD
F	42	Herman Veal	6 ft 6 in (1.98 m)	200 lb (91 kg)	Sr	Jackson, MS
C	54	Ben Coleman	6 ft 9 in (2.06 m)	220 lb (100 kg)	Sr	Minneapolis, MN

Head coach

- Charles "Lefty" Driesell

Assistant coach(es)

- Sherman Dillard
- Mel Cartwright
- Ron Bradley

Legend

- (C) Team captain
- (S) Suspended
- (I) Ineligible
- (W) Walk-on
- Injured
- Current redshirt

Roster
Last update: 2016-06-16

== Schedule ==
Date time, TV	Rank^{#}	Opponent^{#}	Result	Record	Site city, state
Regular Season
November 26*	No. 8	Johns Hopkins	W 108-65	1–0	Cole Field House; College Park, Maryland
December 1*	No. 6	vs. Ohio State	L 68-72	1–1	Brendan Byrne Arena; East Rutherford, New Jersey
December 3*	No. 6	Canisius	W 77-55	2–1	Cole Field House; College Park, Maryland
December 6*	No. 11	vs. Penn State	W 67-58	3–1	Hersheypark Arena; Hershey, Pennsylvania
December 10*	No. 11	at Duquesne	W 78-67	4–1	Civic Arena; Pittsburgh, Pennsylvania
December 14*	No. 9	Maryland-Eastern Shore	W 104-69	5–1	Cole Field House; College Park, Maryland
December 24*	No. 8	No. 6 Boston College	W 89-76	6–1	Cole Field House; College Park, Maryland
December 29*	No. 6	Randolph–Macon	W 58-52	7–1	Cole Field House; College Park, Maryland
December 30*	No. 6	La Salle	W 96-83	8–1	Cole Field House; College Park, Maryland
January 4	No. 5	at No. 12 NC State	W 59-55	9–1 (1–0)	Reynolds Coliseum; Raleigh, North Carolina
January 7*	No. 5	William & Mary	W 58-44	10–1 (1–0)	Cole Field House; College Park, Maryland
January 12	No. 5	No. 1 North Carolina	L 62-74	10–2 (1–1)	Cole Field House; College Park, Maryland
January 14	No. 5	at Duke	W 81-75	11–2 (2–1)	Cameron Indoor Stadium; Durham, North Carolina
January 17	No. 7	Clemson	W 85-72	12–2 (3–1)	Cole Field House; College Park, Maryland
January 21*	No. 7	at Old Dominion	W 69-58	13–2 (3–1)	Old Dominion University Fieldhouse; Norfolk, Virginia
January 28*	No. 5	at Notre Dame	L 47-52	13–3 (3–1)	Athletic & Convocation Center; Notre Dame, Indiana
January 31	No. 10	at Virginia	W 67-66	14–3 (4–1)	University Hall; Charlottesville, Virginia
February 4	No. 10	at No. 18 Georgia Tech	L 70-71 ^{2OT}	14–4 (4–2)	Alexander Memorial Coliseum; Atlanta, Georgia
February 8	No. 13	No. 14 Wake Forest (4)	L 87-90 ^{2OT}	14–5 (4–3)	Cole Field House; College Park, Maryland
February 11	No. 13	Duke	L 84-89	14–6 (4–4)	Cole Field House; College Park, Maryland
February 13*	No. 13	Dayton	W 61-59	15–6 (4–4)	Cole Field House; College Park, Maryland
February 18		at Clemson	W 66-65 ^{3OT}	16–6 (5–4)	Littlejohn Coliseum; Clemson, South Carolina
February 19		at No. 1 North Carolina	L 63-78	16–7 (5–5)	Dean Smith Center; Chapel Hill, North Carolina
February 23		Georgia Tech	W 79-74	17–7 (6–5)	Cole Field House; College Park, Maryland
February 26		at No. 15 Wake Forest	W 90-79	18–7 (7–5)	Greensboro Coliseum; Greensboro, North Carolina
February 29	No. 19	NC State	W 63-50	19–7 (8–5)	Cole Field House; College Park, Maryland
March 4	No. 19	Virginia	W 74-65	20–7 (9–5)	Cole Field House; College Park, Maryland
ACC Tournament
March 9	No. 14	vs. NC State	W 69-63	21–7	Greensboro Coliseum; Greensboro, North Carolina
March 10	No. 14	vs. No. 19 Wake Forest	W 66-64	22–7	Greensboro Coliseum; Greensboro, North Carolina
March 11	No. 14	vs. No. 16 Duke	W 74-62	23–7	Greensboro Coliseum; Greensboro, North Carolina
NCAA Tournament
March 17*	(3 ME) No. 11	vs. (6 ME) West Virginia	W 102-77	24–7	Birmingham Coliseum; Birmingham, Alabama
March 22*	(3 ME) No. 11	vs. (2 ME) No. 6 Illinois	L 70-72	24–8	Rupp Arena; Lexington, Kentucky
*Non-conference game. ^{#}Rankings from AP Poll. (#) Tournament seedings in parentheses. ME=Mideast.

== Rankings ==
Ranking movements Legend: ██ Increase in ranking ██ Decrease in ranking — = Not ranked
	Week																
Poll	Pre	1	2	3	4	5	6	7	8	9	10	11	12	13	14	15	Final
AP	8	6	11	9	8	6	5	5	7	5	10	13	—	—	19	14	11
Coaches	Not released		15	9	11	6	6	6	7	5	9	13	17	—	19	14	10
