= Len Bias =

American basketball player (1963–1986)

- Bias after being selected in the 1986 NBA draft 2 days before his death

Personal information
- Born: November 18, 1963 Landover, Maryland, U.S.
- Died: June 19, 1986 (aged 22) College Park, Maryland, U.S.
- Listed height: 6 ft 8 in (2.03 m)
- Listed weight: 240 lb (109 kg)

Career information
- High school: Northwestern (Hyattsville, Maryland)
- College: Maryland (1982–1986)
- NBA draft: 1986: 1st round, 2nd overall pick
- Drafted by: Boston Celtics
- Position: Small forward

Career highlights
- Consensus first-team All-American (1986); Consensus second-team All-American (1985); 2× ACC Player of the Year (1985, 1986); 2× First-team All-ACC (1985, 1986); ACC Athlete of the Year (1986); ACC tournament MVP (1984); Fourth-team Parade All-American (1982)
- Stats at Basketball Reference
- Collegiate Basketball Hall of Fame

Leonard Kevin Bias (November 18, 1963 – June 19, 1986) was an American college basketball player for the Maryland Terrapins. In the last of his four years playing for Maryland, he was named a consensus first-team All-American. Two days after being selected by the Boston Celtics with the second overall pick in the 1986 NBA draft, Bias died from cardiac arrhythmia induced by a cocaine overdose. In 2021, Bias was inducted into the College Basketball Hall of Fame.

== Early life ==
Bias was born and raised in the Prince George's County area in Maryland, just outside of Washington, D.C. He was one of four children born to James Bias Jr. and Dr. Lonise Bias. He had a sister, Michelle, and two brothers, Eric and James III (James III was known as Jay).

Bias graduated from Northwestern High School in Hyattsville, Maryland.

== College career ==
Bias attended the University of Maryland. As a freshman for the Terrapins, he was viewed as "raw and undisciplined." Bias ultimately developed into an All-American player. He led the Atlantic Coast Conference (ACC) in scoring in his junior year and was named the ACC Player of the Year. His senior season was highlighted by his performance in an overtime victory against top-ranked North Carolina, in which he scored 35 points, including seven in the last three minutes of regulation and four in overtime. Bias collected his second ACC Player of the Year award at the end of the year and was named to two All-America teams.

Bias impressed basketball fans with his amazing leaping ability, physical stature, and ability to create plays, and was considered one of the most dynamic players in the nation. By his senior year, scouts from various National Basketball Association teams viewed Bias as the most complete forward in the class of 1986. Celtics scout Ed Badger called Bias an "explosive and exciting kind of player" and compared him to Michael Jordan.

== NBA draft ==
On June 17, 1986, Bias was selected by the Boston Celtics as the second overall pick in the 1986 NBA draft. Red Auerbach, the Celtics' president and general manager, had dealt guard Gerald Henderson and cash to the Seattle SuperSonics for the pick in 1984. After the draft, Bias and his family returned to their suburban Maryland home. On June 18, Bias and his father flew to Boston for an NBA club draft acceptance and product endorsement signing ceremony with the Celtics' coaches and management. Bias had discussions with Reebok's sports marketing division regarding a five-year endorsement package worth $1.6 million.

== Drug overdose and death ==
After returning home, Bias returned to the campus of the University of Maryland. He left campus at approximately 2 a.m. on Thursday, June 19, drove to an off-campus gathering and returned to his Washington Hall dormitory between 2:30 and 3 a.m. For the next three to four hours, Bias, with longtime friend Brian Tribble and several teammates, snorted cocaine in the dormitory suite shared by Bias and his teammates. Bias suffered a seizure and collapsed while talking with teammate Terry Long. At 6:32 a.m., when Tribble called 911, Bias was unconscious and not breathing. All attempts by the emergency medical team to restart his heart and breathing were unsuccessful. After additional attempts to revive him at Leland Memorial Hospital in Riverdale, Maryland, Bias was pronounced dead at 8:55 a.m. of a cardiac arrhythmia related to usage of cocaine. It was reported that there were no other drugs or alcohol found in his system. Bias's death occurred when crack cocaine was being published across media and his death led to greater coverage, when in reality he died using powdered cocaine. This also helped fuel the war on drugs as politicians began focusing on his death.

More than 11,000 people attended a June 23 memorial service at Cole Field House, the university's basketball arena and student center where Bias played for the Terrapins. Those speaking at the service included Auerbach, who said that he had planned to draft Bias for three years. On June 30, 1986, the Celtics honored Bias with a memorial service in which his unused #30 Celtics jersey was given to his mother Lonise.

Bias was interred at Lincoln Memorial Cemetery in Suitland, Maryland.

== Later developments ==
=== Criminal charges ===
On July 25, 1986, a grand jury returned indictments against Brian Tribble for possession of cocaine and possession of cocaine with intent to distribute. Bias's Maryland teammates Terry Long and David Gregg were charged with possession of cocaine and obstruction of justice. Long and Gregg were suspended from the team on July 31. All three defendants entered not guilty pleas in August.

On October 20, 1986, prosecutors dropped all charges against Long and Gregg in exchange for their testimony against Tribble. On October 30, the grand jury added three more indictments against Tribble—one count of conspiracy to obstruct justice and two counts of obstruction of justice.

Also on October 30, Kenneth Mark Fobbs, Tribble's roommate, was charged with perjury for allegedly lying to the grand jury about the last time that he had seen Tribble. The state dropped the perjury charges against Fobbs on March 24, 1987, and a jury acquitted Tribble of all charges related to the Bias case on June 3, 1987.

In October 1990, Tribble pleaded guilty to a drug charge following a two-year undercover sting operation. He cooperated with the government and was sentenced to ten years and one month in prison.

=== Family ===
On December 5, 1990, Bias's younger brother Jay was murdered in a drive-by shooting at age 20. The killing followed a dispute in the parking lot of Prince George's Plaza, a Hyattsville shopping mall just a few miles from the University of Maryland. He was pronounced dead at the same hospital where his brother Len had died and was buried next to him at Lincoln Memorial Cemetery.

Following their sons' deaths, James and Lonise Bias assumed vocal advocacy roles. Lonise Bias became an anti-drug lecturer, while James Bias became an advocate for gun control. Lonise Bias, in the memory of her children, opened the Len and Jay Bias Foundation, which serves to encourage better examples for youth. Lonise Bias died on March 3, 2026.

=== Len Bias Law ===
A few weeks after Bias's death, committees in the United States House of Representatives began writing anti-drug legislation. The Anti-Drug Abuse Act of 1986 was signed by President Ronald Reagan on October 27, 1986. The law provides a mandatory minimum prison term of 20 years and a maximum life sentence, along with a fine of up to $2 million, for cases of drug distribution that lead to the death or serious injury of a person. It is also known as the "Len Bias Law."

=== University of Maryland investigation ===
The circumstances surrounding Bias's death threw the University of Maryland and its athletics program into turmoil. An investigation revealed that Bias was 21 credits short of the graduation requirement despite having attended the university for four full years; in his final semester, he earned no academic credits, failing three courses and withdrawing from two others. On August 26, 1986, state attorney Arthur A. Marshall Jr. stated that in the hours after Bias's death, Maryland head basketball coach Lefty Driesell told players to remove drugs from Bias's dorm room. Two days later, Bias's father James accused the university and Driesell of neglecting their athletes' academic status.

The controversy prompted athletic director Dick Dull to resign on October 7, 1986, with Driesell following suit on October 29 after 17 years as coach. The grand jury presiding over the Bias case issued a final report on February 26, 1987, criticizing the University of Maryland's athletic department, admissions office and campus police.

== Career statistics ==
Legend
GP	Games played	GS	Games started	MPG	Minutes per game
FG%	Field goal percentage	3P%	3-point field goal percentage	FT%	Free throw percentage
RPG	Rebounds per game	APG	Assists per game	SPG	Steals per game
BPG	Blocks per game	PPG	Points per game	**Bold**	Career high

=== College ===
Year	Team	GP	GS	MPG	FG%	3P%	FT%	RPG	APG	SPG	BPG	PPG
1982–83	Maryland	30	13	22.0	.478	**.273**	.636	4.2	.7	.3	.5	9.3
1983–84	Maryland	32	31	34.5	**.567**	—	.767	4.5	1.5	.4	.8	15.3
1984–85	Maryland	**37**	**37**	36.5	.528	—	.777	6.8	**5.8**	**.9**	**.9**	21.9
1985–86	Maryland	32	32	**37.0**	.544	—	**.864**	**7.0**	7.0	.8	.4	26.2
Career		131	113	32.8	.536	.273	.795	5.7	1.3	.6	.7	18.4

== Film and media ==
A documentary film about Bias's life titled Without Bias, directed by Kirk Fraser, was promoted at the 2008 Sundance Film Festival and released June 19, 2009. The film premiered on ESPN on November 3, 2009, as part of the network's 30 for 30 documentary series.

In Season 6 of TV series NCIS, Bias's manner of death was discussed. Bias's death was depicted in the Season 5 episode titled “Comets” of the television series Snowfall. A segment in the documentary Crack: Cocaine, Corruption & Conspiracy discusses the impact of Bias's death on the public's perception of the crack epidemic. Bias was also mentioned during a Saved by the Bell episode on drug abuse.

== See also ==
- List of basketball players who died during their careers
- Don Rogers
