= 1984 ACC men's basketball tournament =

- Classification: Division I
- Season: 1983–84
- Teams: 8
- Site: Greensboro Coliseum; Greensboro, North Carolina
- Champions: Maryland (2nd title)
- Winning coach: Lefty Driesell (1st title)
- MVP: Len Bias (Maryland)
- Television: Raycom Sports/Jefferson Pilot Teleproductions

1983–84 ACC men's basketball standings
	Conf.				Overall
Team	W		L	PCT	W		L	PCT
No. 1 North Carolina	14	–	0	1.000	28	–	3	.903
No. 11 Maryland †	9	–	5	.643	24	–	8	.750
No. 19 Wake Forest	7	–	7	.500	23	–	9	.719
No. 14 Duke	7	–	7	.500	24	–	10	.706
Georgia Tech	6	–	8	.429	18	–	11	.621
Virginia	6	–	8	.429	21	–	12	.636
NC State	4	–	10	.286	19	–	14	.576
Clemson	3	–	11	.214	14	–	14	.500
† 1984 ACC tournament winner Rankings from AP Poll

The 1984 ACC men's basketball tournament was held in Greensboro, North Carolina, at the Greensboro Coliseum from March 9–11. Maryland defeated Duke, 74–62, to win the championship. Len Bias of Maryland was named the tournament MVP.

== Bracket ==
Quarterfinals; March 9
1	#1 North Carolina	78
8	Clemson	66
4	#16 Duke	67^{OT}
5	Georgia Tech	63
2	#14 Maryland	69
7	NC State	63
3	#19 Wake Forest	63
6	Virginia	51

Semifinals; March 10
1	#1 North Carolina	75
4	#16 Duke	77
2	#14 Maryland	66
3	#19 Wake Forest	64

Championship Game; March 11
4	#16 Duke	62
2	#14 Maryland	74
