= 1983–84 North Carolina Tar Heels men's basketball team =

American college basketball season

1983–84 North Carolina Tar Heels men's basketball

NCAA Division I regular season champions ACC regular season champions

NCAA tournament, Sweet Sixteen
- Conference: Atlantic Coast Conference

Ranking
- Coaches: No. 1
- AP: No. 1
- Record: 28–3 (14–0 ACC)
- Head coach: Dean Smith (23rd season)
- Assistant coaches: Bill Guthridge (17th season); Eddie Fogler (13th season); Roy Williams (6th season)
- Home arena: Carmichael Auditorium

1983–84 ACC men's basketball standings
	Conf.				Overall
Team	W		L	PCT	W		L	PCT
No. 1 North Carolina	14	–	0	1.000	28	–	3	.903
No. 11 Maryland †	9	–	5	.643	24	–	8	.750
No. 19 Wake Forest	7	–	7	.500	23	–	9	.719
No. 14 Duke	7	–	7	.500	24	–	10	.706
Georgia Tech	6	–	8	.429	18	–	11	.621
Virginia	6	–	8	.429	21	–	12	.636
NC State	4	–	10	.286	19	–	14	.576
Clemson	3	–	11	.214	14	–	14	.500
† 1984 ACC tournament winner Rankings from AP Poll

The 1983–84 North Carolina Tar Heels men's basketball team represented University of North Carolina in the 1983–84 NCAA Division I men's basketball season as a member of the Atlantic Coast Conference. They finished the season 28–3 overall, won the ACC regular season title with a 14–0 record and made it to the Sweet Sixteen of the 1984 NCAA tournament. They were coached by Dean Smith in his twenty-third season as head coach of the Tar Heels. They played their home games at the Carmichael Auditorium in Chapel Hill, North Carolina.

== Season summary ==
Returning seniors Sam Perkins and Matt Doherty, junior Michael Jordan, and sophomore Brad Daugherty, the Tar Heels were ranked #1 in the AP poll and #2 in the Coaches' Poll to start the season.

On Saturday, November 3 coach Dean Smith recorded his 500th career victory with an 88–75 win at Stanford. On Wednesday, January 25 UNC recorded its largest margin of victory in the history of its rivalry with Wake Forest, trouncing Wake Forest 100–63. Except for the second week of the season, North Carolina was ranked #1 in the AP Poll for the entire season. The Tar Heels were 16–0 and dominating other teams, when their point guard, freshman Kenny Smith, was injured. He broke his wrist after being taken down on a break-away against #10 LSU on January 29, 1984. Although North Carolina won the game 90–79, the team's chemistry was disrupted. The Tar Heels won their next four games to reach 21–0 but lost on February 12, 1984, at 19th ranked (UPI) Arkansas 65–64. They won their last five games, including a memorable season-ending game over Duke (see below), to finish the regular season 26–1 and 14–0 in the Atlantic Coast Conference.

Although Kenny Smith returned with a cast on his arm against Duke, the Tar Heels' season ended on a flat note. After beating Clemson in the opening round of the ACC Tournament, North Carolina lost to Duke 77–75 (see below) in the semi-finals of the tournament. Despite the loss, the Tar Heels retained their #1 ranking and received a #1 seed in the East Regional of the NCAA tournament. They received a first-round bye and defeated #8-seed Temple 77–66 in the second round. However, their season ended in disappointment in the East Regional semi-finals with a 72–68 loss to #4-seed Indiana.

Dean Smith often said that the 1983–84 Tar Heels' team was one of the few teams he coached that he felt was the best team in the country. Although freshman Kenny Smith was overshadowed by other teammates on this team, his mid-season injury may have prevented the Tar Heels, and stars Michael Jordan and Sam Perkins, from winning their second national championship in three years.

North Carolina played two notable games against Duke in 1984:

- March 3, 1984: #1 North Carolina 96, Duke 83 (2OT)

The final home game for Matt Doherty, Michael Jordan, and Sam Perkins, was a memorable one for Tar Heels fans. North Carolina looked to be finished when Duke's Mark Alarie converted a three-point play with 20 second to go in regulation and the Tar Heels missed a jumper that would have tied the game. However, after the Blue Devils missed the front end of a one-and-one, Matt Doherty took the inbounds pass the length of the court and hit a 15-footer with one second remaining to force overtime. The teams traded baskets during the first overtime and headed for the second extra session tied at 79. Michael Jordan opened the second overtime with an ally oop and a free throw, but Johnny Dawkins cut the North Carolina lead to 82–81 with a short jumper. Duke would get only one more basket as Jordan and Sam Perkins carried the Tar Heels to the 96–83 final, and North Carolina became the first ACC team in 10 years to go undefeated in conference play (14–0). Alarie led all scorers with 28 points, while Jordan topped Carolina with 25.

- March 10, 1984: #16 Duke 77, #1 North Carolina 75

After losing two close games to North Carolina in the regular season, Duke finally upset the Tar Heels in the semifinals of the ACC Tournament. Johnny Dawkins and Tommy Amaker led the Blue Devils to a 40–32 halftime advantage. Nevertheless, North Carolina went on a 12–2 run to open the second half, tying the score at 44–44 in a game that was close the rest of the way. David Henderson hit four late free throws to keep Duke in the lead, but Michael Jordan closed the gap to 77–75. North Carolina regained possession with three seconds left in the game, but the Tar Heels comeback bid ended with Matt Doherty's errant inbounds pass. Jordan led all scorers with 22 points, while Doherty scored 20 and grabbed 10 rebounds.

== Roster ==
1983–84 North Carolina Tar Heels men's basketball team
Players
Coaches

Pos.	#	Name	Height	Weight	Year	Previous school	Hometown
PG	20	Cliff Morris	6 ft 3 in (1.91 m)	—	Jr		Durham, NC
PG	22	Buzz Peterson	6 ft 4 in (1.93 m)	—	Jr	Asheville	Asheville, NC
G/F	23	Michael Jordan	6 ft 6 in (1.98 m)	195 lb (88 kg)	Jr	Emsley A. Laney	Wilmington, NC
PF	24	Joe Wolf	6 ft 11 in (2.11 m)	230 lb (104 kg)	Fr	Kohler	Kohler, WI
SG	25	Steve Hale	6 ft 4 in (1.93 m)	—	So		Jenks, OK
PG	30	Kenny Smith	6 ft 3 in (1.91 m)	170 lb (77 kg)	Fr	Archbishop Molloy	Queens, NY
PF	35	Dave Popson	6 ft 10 in (2.08 m)	220 lb (100 kg)	Fr	Bishop O'Reilly	Ashley, PA
F/C	41	Sam Perkins	6 ft 9 in (2.06 m)	235 lb (107 kg)	Sr	Shaker (Latham NY	Brooklyn, NY
C	42	Brad Daugherty	6 ft 11 in (2.11 m)	—	So	Owen	Black Mountain, NC
SG	43	Curtis Hunter	6 ft 5 in (1.96 m)	—	Fr	Southern	Durham, NC
SF	44	Matt Doherty	6 ft 8 in (2.03 m)	—	Sr	Holy Trinity	East Meadow, NY
SF	50	Cecil Exum	6 ft 6 in (1.98 m)	—	Sr		Dudley, NC
C	51	Timo Makkonen	6 ft 11 in (2.11 m)	—	Sr		Lahti, Finland

Head coach

- Dean Smith (Kansas)

Assistant coach(es)

- Bill Guthridge (Kansas State)
- Eddie Fogler (North Carolina)
- Roy Williams (North Carolina)

Legend

- (C) Team captain
- (S) Suspended
- (I) Ineligible
- (W) Walk-on
- Injured
- Current redshirt

Roster

Source: Tar Heel Times

=== Player stats ===
Player	Games	Minutes	Field Goals	Three Pointers	Free Throws	Rebounds	Blocks	Steals	Points
Michael Jordan	31	915	247	N/A	113	163	35	50	607
Sam Perkins	31	1029	195	N/A	155	298	60	28	545

== Schedule and results ==
Date time, TV	Rank^{#}	Opponent^{#}	Result	Record	Site (attendance) city, state
Regular season
Nov 26, 1983*	No. 1	Missouri	W 64–57	1–0	Greensboro Coliseum; Greensboro, NC
Nov 28, 1983*	No. 1	Tennessee-Chattanooga	W 85–63	2–0	Carmichael Auditorium; Chapel Hill, NC
Dec 2, 1983*	No. 2	vs. Fordham; Stanford Invitational	W 73–56	3–0	Maples Pavilion; Stanford, CA
Dec 3, 1983*	No. 2	at Stanford; Stanford Invitational	W 88–75	4–0	Maples Pavilion; Stanford, CA
Dec 10, 1983*	No. 1	at Syracuse	W 87–64	5–0	Carrier Dome; Syracuse, NY
Dec 21, 1983*	No. 1	Dartmouth	W 103–58	6–0	Carmichael Auditorium; Chapel Hill, NC
Dec 27, 1983*	No. 1	vs. Iona; ECAC Holiday Festival	W 74–61	7–0	Madison Square Garden; New York, NY
Dec 28, 1983*	No. 1	at No. 8 St. John's; ECAC Holiday Festival	W 64–51	8–0	Madison Square Garden; New York, NY
Jan 5, 1984*	No. 1	vs. Boston University	W 87–54	9–0	Charlotte Coliseum; Charlotte, NC
Jan 7, 1984	No. 1	at No. 12 NC State; Carolina–State Game	W 81–60	10–0 (1–0)	Reynolds Coliseum; Raleigh, NC
Jan 12, 1984	No. 1	at No. 5 Maryland	W 74–62	11–0 (2–0)	Cole Field House; College Park, MD
Jan 14, 1984	No. 1	at No. 12 Wake Forest	W 70–62	12–0 (3–0)	Greensboro Coliseum; Greensboro, NC
Jan 18, 1984	No. 1	Virginia	W 69–66	13–0 (4–0)	Carmichael Auditorium; Chapel Hill, NC
Jan 21, 1984	No. 1	at Duke; Rivalry	W 78–73	14–0 (5–0)	Cameron Indoor Stadium; Durham, NC
Jan 25, 1984	No. 1	No. 17 Wake Forest	W 100–63	15–0 (6–0)	Carmichael Auditorium; Chapel Hill, NC
Jan 28, 1984	No. 1	Georgia Tech	W 73–61	16–0 (7–0)	Carmichael Auditorium; Chapel Hill, NC
Jan 29, 1984*	No. 1	LSU	W 90–79	17–0	Carmichael Auditorium; Chapel Hill, NC
Feb 1, 1984	No. 1	Clemson	W 97–75	18–0 (8–0)	Greensboro Coliseum; Greensboro, NC
Feb 3, 1984*	No. 1	vs. Furman; North-South Doubleheaders	W 83–48	19–0	Charlotte Coliseum; Charlotte, NC
Feb 4, 1984*	No. 1	vs. Citadel; North-South Doubleheaders	W 76–60	20–0	Charlotte Coliseum; Charlotte, NC
Feb 9, 1984	No. 1	at Virginia	W 85–72	21–0 (9–0)	University Hall; Charlottesville, VA
Feb 12, 1984*; NBC	No. 1	vs. Arkansas	L 64–65	21–1	Pine Bluff Convention Center (7,529); Pine Bluff, AR
Feb 18, 1984	No. 1	NC State; Carolina–State Game	W 95–71	22–1 (10–0)	Carmichael Auditorium; Chapel Hill, NC
Feb 19, 1984	No. 1	Maryland	W 78–63	23–1 (11–0)	Carmichael Auditorium; Chapel Hill, NC
Feb 26, 1984	No. 1	at Clemson	W 82–71	24–1 (12–0)	Littlejohn Coliseum; Clemson, SC
Feb 29, 1984	No. 1	at Georgia Tech	W 69–56	25–1 (13–0)	Omni Coliseum; Atlanta, GA
Mar 3, 1984; Raycom/JPT	No. 1	No. 15 Duke; Rivalry	W 96–83 ^{2OT}	26–1 (14–0)	Carmichael Auditorium; Chapel Hill, NC
ACC Tournament
Mar 9, 1984; 12:00 p.m., Raycom/JPT	(1) No. 1	vs. (8) Clemson; Quarterfinal	W 78–66	27–1	Greensboro Coliseum; Greensboro, NC
Mar 10, 1984; Raycom/JPT	(1) No. 1	vs. (4) No. 16 Duke; Semifinal / Rivalry	L 68–72	27–2	Greensboro Coliseum; Greensboro, NC
NCAA Tournament
Mar 17, 1984*	(1 E) No. 1	vs. (8 E) No. 20 Temple; Second Round	W 77–66	28–2	Charlotte Coliseum; Charlotte, NC
Mar 22, 1984*	(1 E) No. 1	vs. (4 E) Indiana; Sweet Sixteen	L 68–72	28–3	Omni Coliseum; Atlanta, GA
*Non-conference game. ^{#}Rankings from AP Poll. (#) Tournament seedings in parentheses. E=East Region. All times are in Eastern Time.

== Rankings ==
Ranking movements Legend: ██ Increase in ranking ██ Decrease in ranking
	Week																
Poll	Pre	1	2	3	4	5	6	7	8	9	10	11	12	13	14	15	Final
AP	1	2	1	1	1	1	1	1	1	1	1	1	1	1	1	1	1
Coaches	Not released		2	2	2	2	2	2	1	1	1	1	1	1	1	1	1

== Awards and honors ==
- Michael Jordan, ACC Player of the Year
- Michael Jordan, Adolph Rupp Trophy
- Michael Jordan, Naismith College Player of the Year
- Michael Jordan, USBWA College Player of the Year
- Michael Jordan, John R. Wooden Award

== Team players drafted into the NBA ==
Year	Round	Pick	Player	NBA club
1984	1	3	Michael Jordan	Chicago Bulls
1984	1	4	Sam Perkins	Dallas Mavericks
1984	6	118	Matt Doherty	Cleveland Cavaliers
1984	9	194	Cecil Exum	Denver Nuggets
1985	7	147	Buzz Peterson	Cleveland Cavaliers
1986	1	1	Brad Daugherty	Cleveland Cavaliers
1986	4	81	Steve Hale	New Jersey Nets
1987	1	6	Kenny Smith	Sacramento Kings
1987	1	13	Joe Wolf	Los Angeles Clippers
1987	4	88	Dave Popson	Detroit Pistons
