= Carmichael Arena =

Arena at the University of North Carolina at Chapel Hill

- Blue Heaven
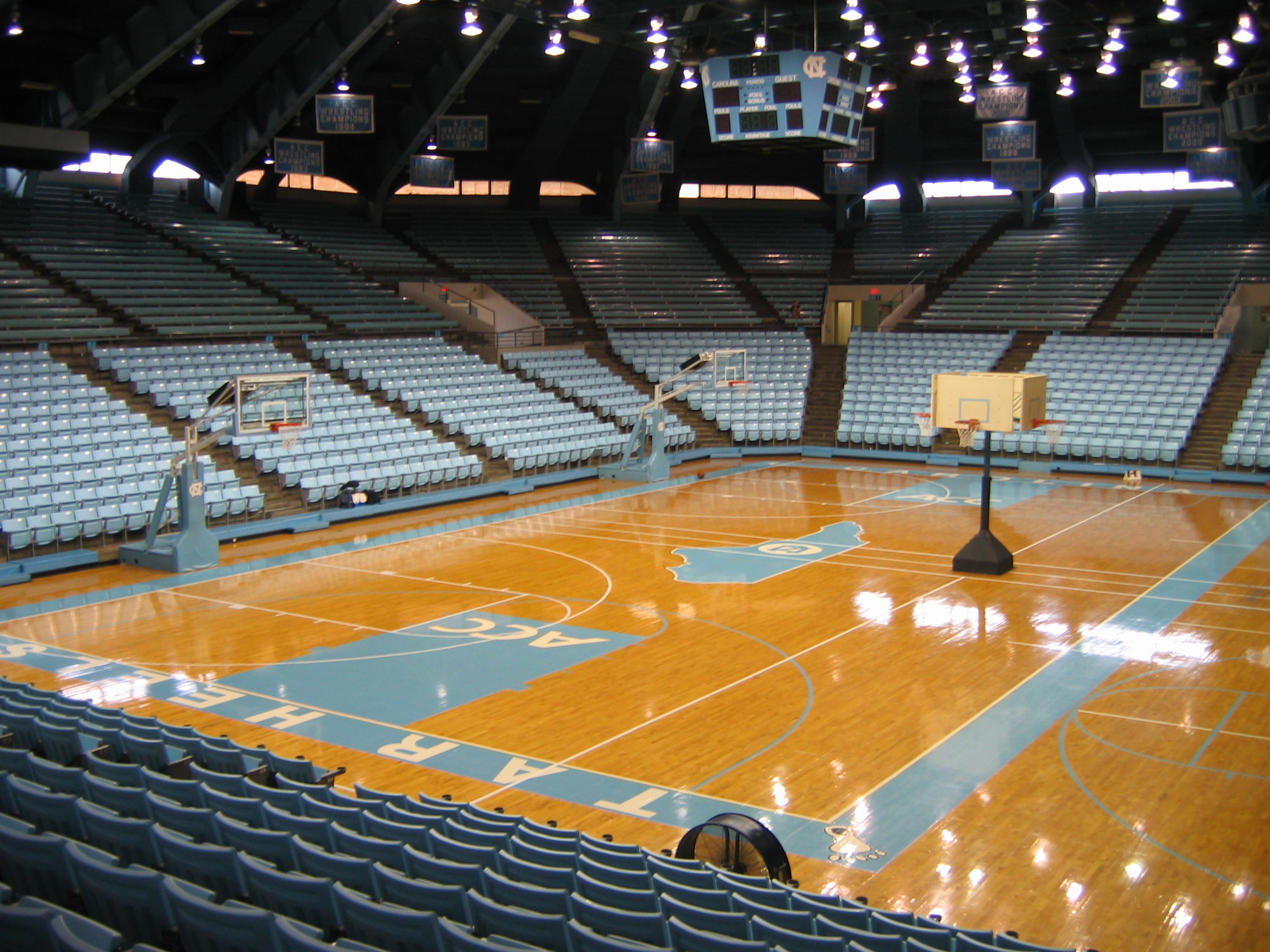
- Interior in 2006, before renovation
- Interactive map of Carmichael Arena
- Full name: William Donald Carmichael, Jr. Arena
- Former names: Carmichael Auditorium (1965–2010)
- Location: 310 South Rd; Chapel Hill, North Carolina 27599, United States
- Coordinates: 35°54.57155′N 79°2.72447′W
- Owner: University of North Carolina at Chapel Hill
- Operator: University of North Carolina at Chapel Hill
- Capacity: 6,822 (Note: When the men's team played in Carmichael Auditorium the capacity often varied in reports by sources and after renovations. The following are previously listed capacity limits: 9,000 (1965 projected when opening), 8,500 (1966), 8,800 (1967-1975), 10,000 (1976-1986). The Daily Tar Heel reported that despite the 8,800 people limit in the 1967-1975 period, the actual maximum was 8,170. Since the departure of the men's team from Carmichael, there have been renovations to the venue which have altered the crowd capacity. The following were previous maximums allowed:)

Construction
- Groundbreaking: May 1964
- Opened: December 4, 1965
- Renovated: 1998, 2008–2009
- Expanded: 1976
- Cost: $1.725 million (original construction) $36.4 million (2008-09 renovation)
- Architect: Corley Redfoot Architects (2008-09 renovation)
- Structural engineer: LHC Structural Engineers (2008-09 renovation)

Tenants
- North Carolina Tar Heels (NCAA); Men's basketball (1965–1986); Women's basketball (1975–present); Women's gymnastics (1982–present); Wrestling (1965–present)

William Donald Carmichael Jr. Arena (formerly known as Carmichael Auditorium and commonly known as Blue Heaven) is a multi-purpose arena on the campus of the University of North Carolina at Chapel Hill in Chapel Hill, North Carolina, United States. It is home to four Tar Heels athletic teams: women's basketball, volleyball, women's gymnastics, and wrestling. By the end of the 1940s, concerns over capacity with the varsity men's basketball team home gym Woollen Gymnasium started and by 1958 the school began to schedule certain basketball games in off-campus venues to allow for more spectators. This desire for more revenue from ticket sales, limited office space, and intramural sports interruption of varsity practices led the school to develop plans for a new arena. After a measure was approved in July 1962, the school was approved to build an addition to the existing Woollen Gymnasium rather than a new $6 million stadium they had hoped for. The venue was to be named for William Donald Carmichael Jr. a former school vice president and varsity basketball player as a student.

Construction began on Carmichael Auditorium in May 1964, which was to include a hydraulic stage to meet the "auditorium" requirement set forth by the state legislature to obtain the $1.725 million to fund the building. Despite a water main break that delayed progress and increased costs, the building was officially opened during University Day on October 12, 1965. The auditorium featured a mix of retractable bleachers and arm–chairs which allowed for an initial 8,170 people to attend games, lower than the 10,000 that was hoped when construction began. The first game to take place in the building featured a match between freshman and the men's varsity team, while the first intercollegiate basketball game was against the Tar Heels beat the William & Mary Indians 82–68. The men's basketball team had great success in the building, winning several conference championships and one national championship in 1981–82. Due to increased interest and limited seating in the building despite renovations to increase seating, the university began to look into building a new arena for the men's basketball team in the 1970s. The men's team moved to the new, privately funded Dean Smith Center during the 1985–86 season after a final game against the NC State Wolfpack where they won 90–79.

While the men's team played in Carmichael, it was known as one of the best home game atmospheres in college basketball due to the crowd's loudness. Meanwhile, opposing teams often complained of how hot it was inside the building. Outside of basketball, the venue has been used to host several concerts, sporting events, and a speech by Barack Obama in 2012. In particular, the building's acoustics became an issue for performers and concert-goers which led to a decline in musical acts at the auditorium in favor of other facilities on campus.

== Background and construction ==
By 1948, there began to be sentiments that Woollen was too small. In 1958, after the university began to reduce the number of true home games, the student newspaper The Daily Tar Heel showed dissatisfaction with that decision and felt a new gym with a larger capacity would be needed to keep drawing strong competition. The article cited how Coach Adolph Rupp and the Kentucky Wildcats played at Duke in front of a less than capacity crowd and would not return because they made little money off the visit. In July 1962, there was a request to the North Carolina state legislature by the Consolidated University to receive funds to build an addition to Woollen Gym rather than a new $6 million coliseum as some had proposed.

It was an incredible home-court advantage. Today, in the newer arenas, it takes two or three minutes to walk from the court to the locker room. From our locker room, we opened a door that was six and a half feet high, everybody ducked to get out, and after five or six steps you were on the court. We’d sit in the locker room and we could hear the crowd outside. To come rushing into that setting with people right on top of you sent chills up and down your spine.

— North Carolina Forward and Center Mitch Kupchak (1972–76)

As the Tar Heels increased in popularity, the university chose to have home games at off–campus venues as Woollen's seating was so limited, choosing to play in Charlotte or Greensboro instead. By playing at these locations, the school would turn more profit than normal home games at Woollen since student tickets were limited for these games and the venue was larger, allowing more tickets to be sold to the masses. In the team's final season at Woollen, the Tar Heels only played seven true home games. Due the various factors including Woollen Gymnasium's capacity, basketball practices being interrupted by intramural sports, and limited office space, the University of North Carolina administration sought plans to build a new facility. The venue was to be named for William Donald Carmichael Jr. a former school vice president and former varsity basketball player from 1917 to 1920, as well as brother of Cartwright Carmichael. The Woollen's seating capacity the number of home games the school could host to around seven games a season, it was hoped that the opening of Carmichael Auditorium would allow for ten home games a season. The new Auditorium's facilities would contain offices for all athletic departments, except for football which would be housed in the then Kenan Fieldhouse, in the east endzone of Kenan Memorial Stadium. A trophy hall will be located in the entrance hallway and housed the trophies of all the athletic programs.

Construction began in May 1964 for the new annexed Auditorium. On August 16, 1965, a water main that was connected improperly broke and flooded the auditorium with eight inches of water, which delayed the construction until a new floor could be placed. The burst was estimated to cost around $14,000 extra to repair. It was hoped that the larger capacity (then estimated to be 10,000) in the auditorium would allow the university to turn a profit on home games for basketball. With the 10,000 projected seats, it would have been the sixth largest "building of its type" in North Carolina. Two-thirds of the seats will be arm-chairs, while the remainder were bleachers that can be retracted with hydraulics. At the time, the basketball program only made money from road trips. By September 1965, it was estimated the total cost of the facility was $1.725 million, with the opening of the new facility university accountant Vernan Crook hoped to turn a profit of $1,000 to $2,000 per home game. The structural steel utilized for the project cost $502,000.

Here you see Kenan Stadium, North Carolina's spectacular football arena, and Carmichael Auditorium, the 'Blue Heaven' of UNC basketball. Look the country over and you won't find two more beautiful or more enjoyable spots to view major sports events.

— Bob Quincy then UNC Sports Information Director (1965)

A lighter blue was used for some of the overhead beams in order to provide good background for the colorful clothes people wear to games. It was reported the dark blue used "expresses the structure." There was a 24 foot by 40 foot hydraulic stage that was added to meet the requirement of an "auditorium" by the state legislature. In total when completed Carmichael contained 65,112 square feet of space. The bleacher seats were placed along the eastern wall that was shared with Woollen and were foldable in order to allow for the stage to rise. The seats in the venue were wood and plastic with a metal frame. The venue featured four bathrooms and four concession stands. In addition, there were sixteen offices located within the building. The backboards utilized were made of Herculite glass and weighed approximately 250 pounds.

Athletic Director C.P. Erickson stated that the new building would not be large enough to fit the growing student body and that the school would need to start planning on how to expand the venue further to accommodate the growth. At that time, the air conditioning ducts had been installed but the school lacked the funds for installing the cooling equipment. The Auditorium was first opened on October 12, 1965, when it hosted University Day to commemorate the 170th anniversary of the university's founding. In front of a crowd of around 4,000, Chancellor Paul F. Sharp spoke regarding the school's current climate. On Saturday November 6, following the North Carolina–Clemson football game in Kenan Memorial Stadium, Carmichael hosted its first basketball game where the men's freshman basketball team squared off against the varsity team. The game had free admission and started at approximately 4PM local time. In an upset, the freshman team led by Rusty Clark and Bill Bunting won 78–74. A rematch was held on the following Wednesday. Nancy Wilson performed the first concert in Carmichael later that evening at 8PM local time, tickets were $1 for students and $1.50 for general admission. Construction was finished in time for the start of the 1965–66 season, where they defeated the William & Mary Indians 82–68 in front of a crowd of roughly 7,000. However, the seats were not fully installed yet, which led to a maximum capacity of 7,000 with the goal to completely installed by December 11.

== History ==
Before the 1972–73 season, students gathered at eight distribution centers within Carmichael to receive tickets. It was reported that students had been injured during these massive gatherings for ticket distribution. Starting with the 1972–73 season, a first-come first serve method, or "perseverance method" as it was called, was utilized. This led to the formation of long queues in front of Carmichael the night before distribution before being let in to wait in the seats at Carmichael. Starting with the 1975–76 season, the school decided it would randomly distribute the tickets to the first 3,200 that arrived in order to reduce the chaos by those arriving early to get a better seat. This new system was felt to be improved compared to the first-come, first-served method, but some students still preferred the previous way.

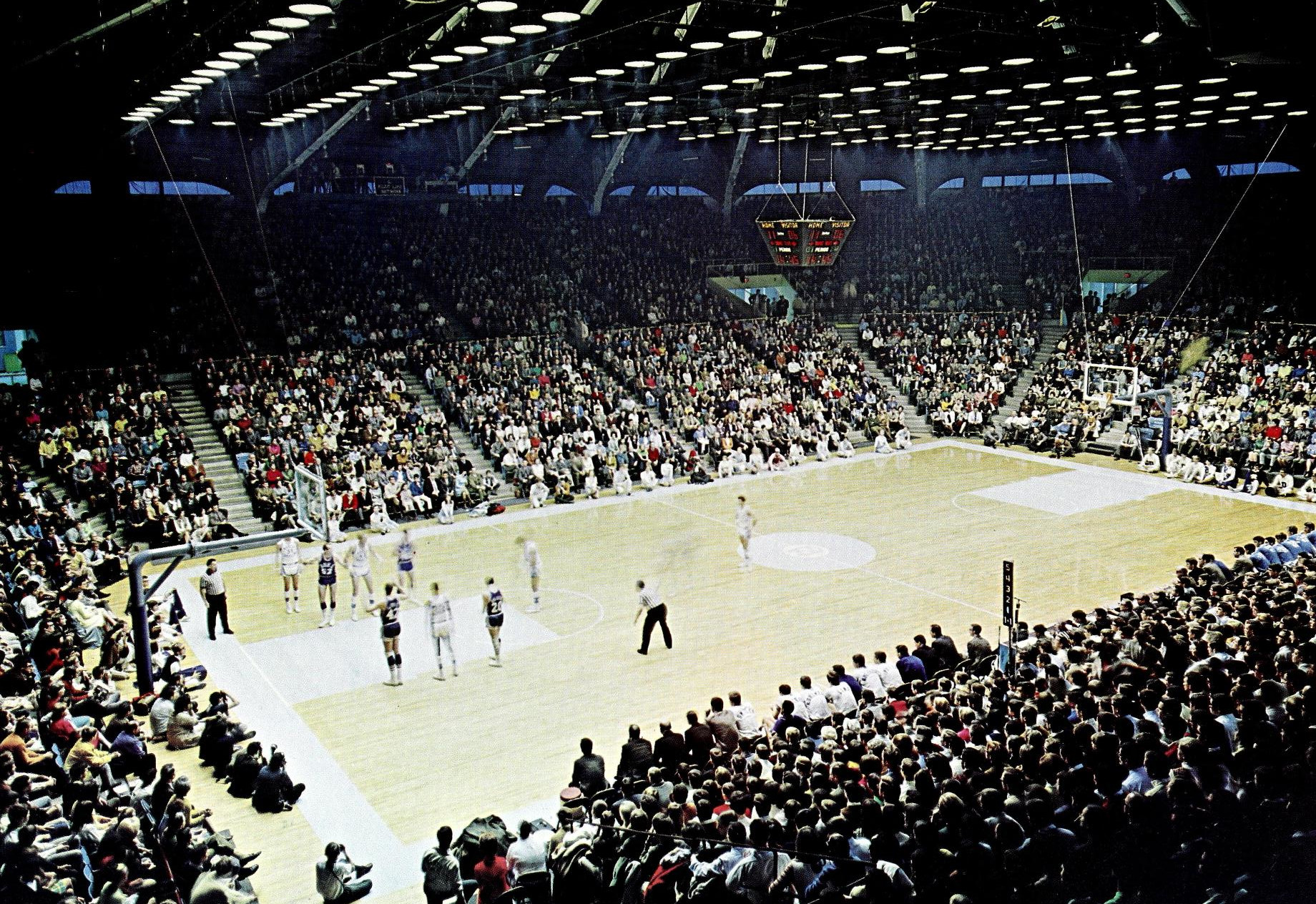
Carmichael Auditorium, circa 1968

Issues with limited seating capacity forced the university to consider a new facility starting in the 1970s. Following a recommendation from Coach Smith, plans were approved in late March or early April 1976 to increase capacity in Carmichael by 900 seats through the removal of 6,617 permanent seats with aluminum back supported bleachers. It was estimated the change from seat to bleacher would give a two-inch reduction per seat leading to roughly 2 more people per row. Students were to receive 450 of the new seats. Carmichael at the time sat 8,200. The renovation cost approximately $62,000 and was paid for with the athletic budget. South Carolina Seating Company won the bid for the job. When asked about enlarging Carmichael itself, Coach Smith stated that "We have been exploring that for a long time but we don't know structurally if that can be done or to what extent. It's still in the thought stage." Following the renovation's completion, the former seats were sold to fans. There was some concern that expanding the venue in this manner would impact recruiting, to which Smith dismissed. He added "... two years from now no one will remember what type of seats we had."

In a column over the increasing ticket issue, The Daily Tar Heel in January 1976 wrote that the capacity was truly 8,170 despite being reported as 8,800 and that demand was typically double capacity at least since its opening. In the 1975–76 season the auditorium contained 6,617 permanent seats at the time, 3,200 to students (1,503 bleacher seats and 1,697 permanent seats), 2,350 went to the Rams Club (where one must've donated $500 in 1975 to get the opportunity to purchase tickets), 2,150 tickets to faculty and staff, and 500 were reserved for press, player's families, Dean Smith's office workers, or given out as complimentary by the athletic department. Priority system was developed prior to the 1975–76 season because there were over 9,000 faculty and staff members and it ranked the following criteria in descending order: years of ticket purchase, length of employment at North Carolina, and rank. Ultimately it was believed no matter the way the lottery was done, the only solution to the ticket problem would be a larger facility.

The school had started scheduling some home games in Greensboro and Charlotte as they had prior to Carmichael's opening when the team was still in Woollen. However, at the time a large fundraising effort for the school was ongoing and efforts would be started following its conclusion in 1979.

It was expanded to 10,000 seats in 1976.

Carmichael was known as one of the loudest arenas in the country while the Tar Heel men played there, largely because of a low roof and a student section that ringed the court. In part due to this formidable home court advantage, the men had a record of 169–20 (.894) in just over 20 seasons there. Dean Smith was the Tar Heels' coach for their entire tenure in Carmichael. After a remodeling project completed in 2009, capacity is 8,010.

A new floor was installed in 1998, after a roof fire that occurred in February during renovations. The arena was completely remodeled beginning in spring 2008, and the women's team joined the men in the Dean Smith Center until completion in December 2009. The facility was officially renamed Carmichael Arena during the women's team's matchup against rival Duke on February 28, 2010.

== Atmosphere ==
There were times at Carmichael when the crowd was so loud that a referee would call a foul or a violation and nobody would stop playing. The ref would have to almost tackle the guy with the ball because it was so loud. It was nutty in there, and it was hot.

— North Carolina Forward and Center Tommy LaGarde (1973–77)

The venue was known for its loud atmosphere and temperature, so much that Maryland Terrapins coach Lefty Driesell and Virginia Cavaliers coach Terry Holland accused Dean Smith of tampering with the thermostat. Smith would often keep Carmichael warm during practice to simulate the stuffy game conditions. Long time assistant coach and future head coach Roy Williams once said "I guarantee you that for $1,000, Coach Smith couldn’t have found the thermostat or the light switch in Carmichael Auditorium."

=== Home-court advantage ===
Carolina played their final home game at Carmichael on January 4, 1986, against NC State Wolfpack and won 90–79. Since the team's departure for the Smith Center, the men's basketball has returned to Carmichael on two occasions in 2010 and 2019, where they played William & Mary as a part of the National Invitation Tournament and won 82–70 and later against Wofford, losing 68–64. In total, Carolina played 191 games in Carmichael and finished with a record of 170–21 (.890). As of the conclusion of the 2021–22 season, Carmichael has the best home winning percentage of the five home venues for the Tar Heels. The Tar Heels went undefeated at Carmichael Auditorium in six of their twenty-one seasons at the facility: 1969–69 (9–0), 1970–71 (9–0), 1971–72 (9–0), 1978–79 (9–0), 1983–84 (9–0), and 1977–78 (10–0). The most losses in a single season while playing in Carmichael came in the 1972–73 campaign when the Tar Heels lost three games. The Tar Heels showed success in the Atlantic Coast Conference, winning the ACC regular season title in 1967, 1968, 1969, 1971, 1972, 1976, 1977, 1978, 1979, 1982, 1983, 1984, and 1985, while winning the post–season conference tournament in 1967, 1968, 1969, 1972, 1975, 1977, 1979, 1981, and 1982.

Since the women's team inaugural season in 1974–75, the Lady Heels have compiled a record of 567-124 (0.796) across 712 games through the 2024–25. The women's team has gone undefeated at Carmichael Auditorium in seven seasons: 1974–75 (7–0), 1982–83 (11–0), 1984–85 (11–0), 1993–94 (11–0), (Note: The women's team played 16 home games in Chapel Hill, eleven of which were played in Carmichael. The remaining five games were played at the Dean E. Smith Center, where the team finished with a record of 4–1 in those games.) 1996–97 (15–0), 2004–05 (12–0), (Note: The women's team played 17 home games in Chapel Hill, twelve of which were played in Carmichael. The remaining five games were played at the Dean E. Smith Center, where the team finished with a record of 5–0 in those games.) and 2007–08 (17–0). (Note: The women's team played 18 home games in Chapel Hill, where all but one of the games were played in Carmichael. The remaining game was played at the Dean E. Smith Center, which the team won.) The team has had success while competing in the ACC, winning the conference regular season title in four seasons: 1997, 2005, 2006, and 2008. In the ACC women's basketball tournament, the Lady Heels have won the title nine times: 1984, 1994, 1995, 1997, 1998, 2005, 2006, 2007, and 2008.

== Other uses ==
Carmichael hosted many concerts and public speakers over its early years, but those numbers declined into the mid-1970s. Since its opening, the acoustics had been criticized in Carmichael, while the noise reverberating off the steel beams lining the "dome-like ceiling" was a benefit during home basketball games, it had been negatively received by musicians and concert go-ers. While performing, Stephen Stills commented on the acoustics in Carmichael stating: "It sounds like the inside of a goddamn toilet bowl in [Carmichael]." (Note: Stephen Stills performed at Carmichael Auditorium on . In March 1976, The Daily Tar Heel quoted him saying: "This place sounds like a goddamn toilet bowl." Then later in September 1976, The Daily Tar Heel quoted Stills as: "It sounds like the inside of a toilet bowl in here.") Concerts also had declined because the Carolina Union could not afford the asking price of the desired acts in combination with the fact musicians started to gravitate towards scheduling larger regional venues in order to increase revenue like the Greensboro Coliseum. In response to these developments, the school began scheduling smaller acts at Memorial Hall which sat around 1,600 in 1976. Then Carolina Union Director Howard Henry commented that when Carmichael was being built ceiling acoustic panels were declined to be included in construction and if added in 1976 would cost approximately $100,000. Some of the notable performers in Carmichael include: Louis Armstrong (1965), The Supremes (in 1965), Jethro Tull (in 1971), Black Sabbath (in 1971), Fleetwood Mac (in 1975), Talking Heads (in 1983), Prince (in 1983), Neil Young (in 1983), The Clash (in 1984), Alanis Morissette (in 1999), J. Cole (in 2012), and 2 Chainz (in 2017). Comedian Eddie Murphy performed in front of an audience of around 8,000 in 1985.

in 1987, Carmichael hosted the U.S. Olympic Festival volleyball competition. Carolina union concert program. In 2001, the Matjam collegiate wrestling championships for the ACC, Colonial, and Southern conferences. Carmichael has hosted several rounds of the women's basketball and women's volleyball NCAA Tournaments. The facility is also use for state championships for several sports including volleyball, basketball, and wrestling, along with various camps.

The arena hosted a speech by President Barack Obama on April 24, 2012.

== See also ==
- List of NCAA Division I basketball arenas
