= 1986 National Invitation Tournament =

Annual NCAA college basketball competition

- Season: 1985–86
- Teams: 32
- Finals site: Madison Square Garden, New York City
- Champions: Ohio State Buckeyes (1st title)
- Runner-up: Wyoming Cowboys (1st title game)
- Semifinalists: Louisiana Tech Bulldogs (1st semifinal); Florida Gators (1st semifinal)
- Winning coach: Eldon Miller (1st title)
- MVP: Brad Sellers (Ohio State)

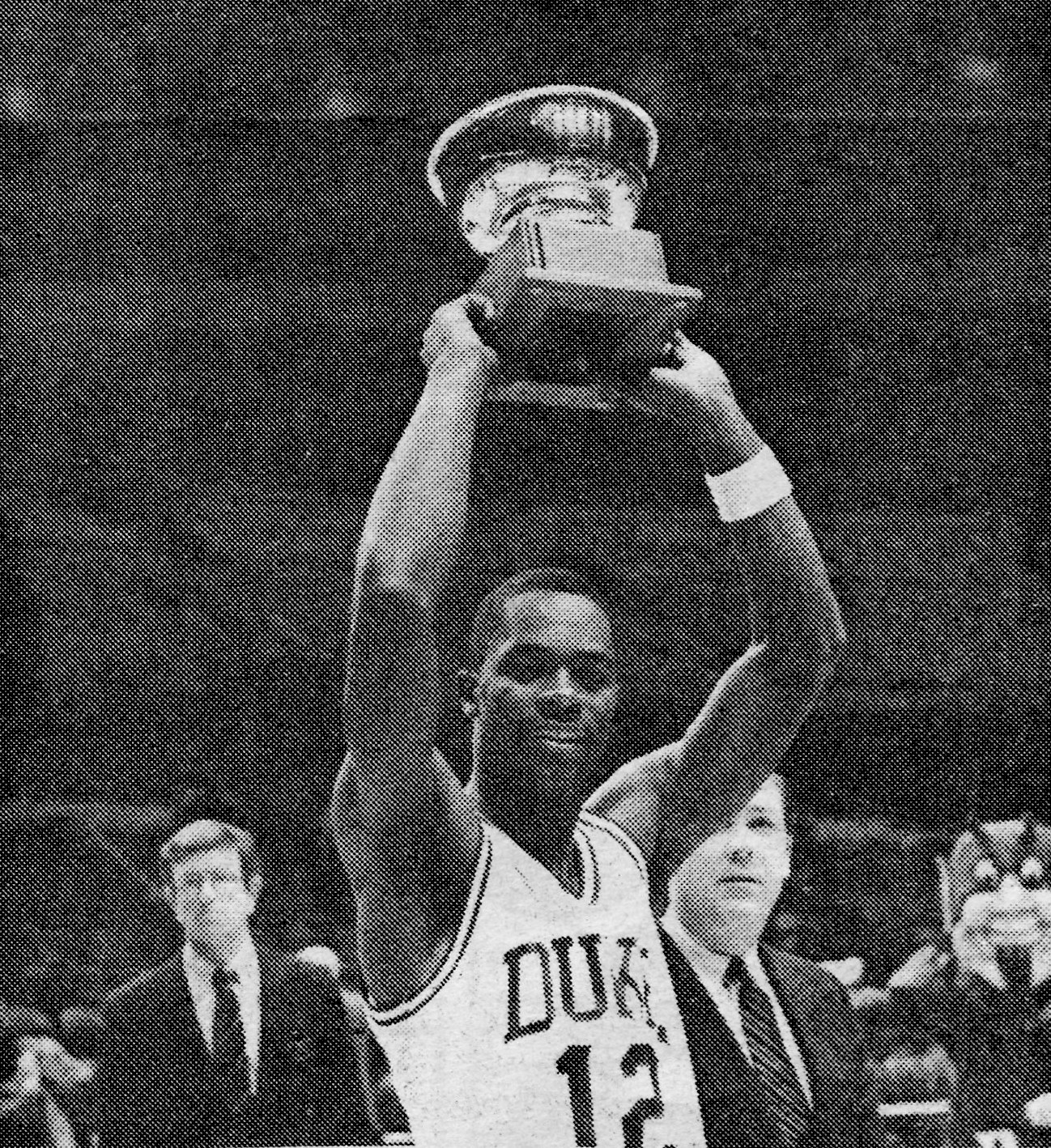

The 1986 National Invitation Tournament was the 1986 edition of the annual NCAA college basketball competition.

== Selected teams ==
Below is a list of the 32 teams selected for the tournament.

- Boston University
- BYU
- California
- Clemson
- Dayton
- Drake
- Florida
- George Mason
- Georgia
- Lamar
- Louisiana Tech
- Loyola Marymount
- Marquette
- McNeese State
- Middle Tennessee State
- Montana
- New Mexico
- Northern Arizona
- Ohio
- Ohio State
- Pittsburgh
- Providence
- SMU
- Southern Miss
- SW Missouri State
- Tennessee-Chattanooga
- TCU
- Texas
- Texas A&M
- UC Irvine
- UCLA
- Wyoming

== Bracket ==
Below are the four first round brackets, along with the four-team championship bracket.

First Round
Providence	72
Boston University	69
George Mason	65
Lamar	63
Louisiana Tech	67
Northern Arizona	61
McNeese State	86
Dayton	75

Second Round
Providence	90
George Mason	71
Louisiana Tech	77
McNeese State	61

Quarterfinals
Providence	63
Louisiana Tech	64

First Round
Ohio State	65
Ohio	62
Texas	69
New Mexico	66
BYU	67
SMU	63
UC Irvine	80
UCLA	74

Second Round
Ohio State	71
Texas	65
BYU	93
UC Irvine	80

Quarterfinals
Ohio State	79
BYU	68

First Round
Florida	81
Southern Miss	71
TCU	76
Montana	69
SW Missouri State	59
Pittsburgh	52
Marquette	79
Drake	59

Second Round
Florida	77
TCU	75
SW Missouri State	83
Marquette	69

Quarterfinals
Florida	54
SW Missouri State	53

First Round
Wyoming	79
Texas A&M	70
Loyola Marymount	80
California	75
Georgia	95
Tennessee-Chattanooga	81
Clemson	99
Middle Tennessee State	81

Second Round
Wyoming	99
Loyola Marymount	90
Georgia	65
Clemson	77

Quarterfinals
Wyoming	62
Clemson	57

=== Semifinals & finals ===
Semifinals
Louisiana Tech	66
Ohio State	79
Florida	58
Wyoming	67

Finals
Ohio State	73
Wyoming	63

Third place game
Louisiana Tech	67
Florida	62

== See also ==
- 1986 National Women's Invitational Tournament
- 1986 NCAA Division I men's basketball tournament
- 1986 NCAA Division II men's basketball tournament
- 1986 NCAA Division III men's basketball tournament
- 1986 NCAA Division I women's basketball tournament
- 1986 NCAA Division II women's basketball tournament
- 1986 NCAA Division III women's basketball tournament
- 1986 NAIA men's basketball tournament
- 1986 NAIA Division I women's basketball tournament
