= List of Louisville Cardinals men's basketball seasons =

This is a list of seasons completed by the Louisville Cardinals men's college basketball team.

== Seasons ==
Record table
Season	Coach	Overall	Conference	Standing	Postseason
(Independent) (1911–1923)
1911–12	Craig Sand	0–3			
1912–13	Captains	2–3			
1913–14	Captains	2–6			
1914–15	Captains	4–5			
1915–16	Ed Bowman	8–3			
1916–17	No team				
1917–18	Ed Bowman	3–4			
1918–19	Earl Ford	7–4			
1919–20	Tuley Brucker	6–5			
1920–21	Jimmie Powers	3–8			
1921–22	John T. O'Rouke	1–13			
1922–23	No team				
Fred Enke (KIAC & SIAA) (1923–1925)
1923–24	Fred Enke	4–13			
1924–25	Fred Enke	10–7			
Fred Enke:		14–20			
Tom King (KIAC& SIAA) (1925–1930)
1925–26	Tom King	4–8			
1926–27	Tom King	7–5			
1927–28	Tom King	12–4		1st KIAC	
1928–29	Tom King	12–8		1st KIAC	
1929–30	Tom King	9–6			
Tom King:		44–21			
Edward Weber (KIAC & SIAA) (1930–1932)
1930–31	Edward Weber	5–11			
1931–32	Edward Weber	15–7			
Edward Weber:		20–18			
C.V. Money (KIAC & SIAA) (1932–1936)
1932–33	C.V. Money	11–11			
1933–34	C.V. Money	16–9		2nd KIAC	
1934–35	C.V. Money	5–9			
1935–36	C.V. Money	14–11			
C.V. Money:		46–40			
Lawrence Apitz (KIAC & SIAA) (1936–1940)
1936–37	Lawrence Apitz	4–8			
1937–38	Lawrence Apitz	4–11			
1938–39	Lawrence Apitz	1–15			
1939–40	Lawrence Apitz	1–18			
Lawrence Apitz:		10–52			
John C. Heldman, Jr. (KIAC & SIAA) (1940–1942)
1940–41	John C. Heldman, Jr.	2–14			
1941–42	John C. Heldman, Jr.	7–10			
John C. Heldman, Jr.:		9–24			
No Team (World War II) (1942–1943)
Harold Church & Walter Casey (KIAC) (1943–1944)
1943–44	Harold Church; Walter Casey	10–10			
Harold Church & Walter Casey:		10–10			
Bernard Hickman (KIAC) (1944–1948)
1944–45	Bernard Hickman	16–3			
1945–46	Bernard Hickman	22–6		2nd	
1946–47	Bernard Hickman	17–6			
1947–48	Bernard Hickman	29–6		2nd	NAIA Champion
Bernard Hickman (Ohio Valley Conference) (1948–1949)
1948–49	Bernard Hickman	23–10	6–3	3rd	
Bernard Hickman (Independent) (1949–1964)
1949–50	Bernard Hickman	21–11			
1950–51	Bernard Hickman	19–7			NCAA Sweet Sixteen
1951–52	Bernard Hickman	20–6			NIT first round
1952–53	Bernard Hickman	22–6			NIT Quarterfinal
1953–54	Bernard Hickman	22–7			NIT first round
1954–55	Bernard Hickman	19–8			NIT Quarterfinal
1955–56	Bernard Hickman	26–3			NIT Champion
1956–57	Bernard Hickman	21–5			
1957–58	Bernard Hickman	13–12			
1958–59	Bernard Hickman	19–12			NCAA University Division Final Four
1959–60	Bernard Hickman	15–11			
1960–61	Bernard Hickman	21–8			NCAA University Division Sweet Sixteen
1961–62	Bernard Hickman	15–10			
1962–63	Bernard Hickman	14–11			
1963–64	Bernard Hickman	15–10			NCAA University Division first round
Bernard Hickman (Missouri Valley Conference) (1964–1967)
1964–65	Bernard Hickman	15–10	8–6	4th	
1965–66	Bernard Hickman	16–10	8–6	4th	NIT first round
1966–67	Bernard Hickman	23–5	12–2	1st	NCAA University Division Sweet Sixteen
Bernard Hickman:		443–183	20–8		
John Dromo (Missouri Valley Conference) (1967–1971)
1967–68	John Dromo	21–7	14–2	1st	NCAA University Division Sweet Sixteen
1968–69	John Dromo	21–6	13–3	2nd	NIT Quarterfinal
1969–70	John Dromo	18–9	11–5	3rd	NIT first round
1970–71	John Dromo; Howard Stacey	20–9	9–5	T–1st	NIT first round
John Dromo:		68–23	38–10		
Howard Stacey:		12–8	9–5		
Denny Crum (Missouri Valley Conference) (1971–1975)
1971–72	Denny Crum	26–5	12–2	T–1st	NCAA University Division Final Four
1972–73	Denny Crum	23–7	11–3	2nd	NIT Quarterfinal
1973–74	Denny Crum	21–7	11–1	1st	NCAA Division I Sweet Sixteen
1974–75	Denny Crum	28–3	12–2	1st	NCAA Division I Final Four
Denny Crum (Metro Conference) (1975–1995)
1975–76	Denny Crum	20–8	2–2	2nd	NIT Quarterfinal
1976–77	Denny Crum	21–7	6–1	1st	NCAA Division I first round
1977–78	Denny Crum	23–7	9–3	2nd	NCAA Division I Sweet Sixteen
1978–79	Denny Crum	24–8	9–1	1st	NCAA Division I Sweet Sixteen
1979–80	Denny Crum	33–3	12–0	1st	NCAA Division I Champion
1980–81	Denny Crum	21–9	11–1	1st	NCAA Division I second round
1981–82	Denny Crum	23–10	8–4	2nd	NCAA Division I Final Four
1982–83	Denny Crum	32–4	12–0	1st	NCAA Division I Final Four
1983–84	Denny Crum	24–11	11–3	T–1st	NCAA Division I Sweet Sixteen
1984–85	Denny Crum	19–18	6–8	T–4th	NIT Fourth Place
1985–86	Denny Crum	32–7	10–2	1st	NCAA Division I Champion
1986–87	Denny Crum	18–14	9–3	1st	
1987–88	Denny Crum	24–11	9–3	1st	NCAA Division I Sweet Sixteen
1988–89	Denny Crum	24–9	8–4	T–2nd	NCAA Division I Sweet Sixteen
1989–90	Denny Crum	27–8	12–2	1st	NCAA Division I second round
1990–91	Denny Crum	14–16	4–10	8th	
1991–92	Denny Crum	19–11	7–5	T–2nd	NCAA Division I second round
1992–93	Denny Crum	22–9	11–1	1st	NCAA Division I Sweet Sixteen
1993–94	Denny Crum	28–6	10–2	1st	NCAA Division I Sweet Sixteen
1994–95	Denny Crum	19–14	7–5	T–2nd	NCAA Division I first round
Denny Crum (Conference USA) (1995–2001)
1995–96	Denny Crum	22–12	10–4	T–3rd	NCAA Division I Sweet Sixteen
1996–97	Denny Crum	26–9	9–5	T–5th	NCAA Division I Elite Eight
1997–98	Denny Crum	12–20	5–11	5th (American)	
1998–99	Denny Crum	19–11	11–5	2nd (American)	NCAA Division I first round
1999–00	Denny Crum	19–12	10–6	2nd (American)	NCAA Division I first round
2000–01	Denny Crum	12–19	8–8	T–5th (American)	
Denny Crum:		675–295	272–107		
Rick Pitino (Conference USA) (2001–2005)
2001–02	Rick Pitino	19–13	8–8	5th (American)	NIT second round
2002–03	Rick Pitino	25–7	11–5	2nd (American)	NCAA Division I second round
2003–04	Rick Pitino	20–10	9–7	T–6th	NCAA Division I first round
2004–05	Rick Pitino	33–5	14–2	1st	NCAA Division I Final Four
Rick Pitino (Big East Conference) (2005–2013)
2005–06	Rick Pitino	21–13	6–10	11th	NIT Semifinal
2006–07	Rick Pitino	24–10	12–4	2nd	NCAA Division I second round
2007–08	Rick Pitino	27–9	14–4	2nd	NCAA Division I Elite Eight
2008–09	Rick Pitino	31–6	16–2	1st	NCAA Division I Elite Eight
2009–10	Rick Pitino	20–13	11–7	2nd	NCAA Division I first round
2010–11	Rick Pitino	25–10	12–6	4th	NCAA Division I first round
2011–12	Rick Pitino	30–10^{[Note A]}	10–8^{[Note A]}	7th	NCAA Division I Final Four
2012–13	Rick Pitino	35–5^{[Note B]}	14–4^{[Note B]}	1st	NCAA Division I Champion^{[Note C]}
Rick Pitino (American Athletic Conference) (2013–2014)
2013–14	Rick Pitino	31–6^{[Note D]}	15–3^{[Note D]}	T–1st	NCAA Division I Sweet Sixteen
Rick Pitino (Atlantic Coast Conference) (2014–2017)
2014–15	Rick Pitino	27–9^{[Note E]}	12–6^{[Note E]}	4th	NCAA Division I Elite Eight
2015–16	Rick Pitino	23–8	12–6	4th	Ineligible^{[Note F]}
2016–17	Rick Pitino	25–9	12–6	2nd	NCAA Division I second round
Rick Pitino:		293–143	137–88		
David Padgett (Atlantic Coast Conference) (2017–2018)
2017–18	David Padgett	22–14	9–9	T–8th	NIT Quarterfinal
David Padgett:		22–14	9–9		
Chris Mack (Atlantic Coast Conference) (2018–2022)
2018–19	Chris Mack	20–14	10–8	T–6th	NCAA Division I first round
2019–20	Chris Mack	24–7	15–5	T–2nd	No postseason held
2020–21	Chris Mack	13–7	8–5	7th	
2021–22	Chris Mack; Mike Pegues^{[Note H]}	13–19	6–14	T–11th	
Chris Mack:		63–36	38–23		
Kenny Payne (Atlantic Coast Conference) (2022–2024)
2022–23	Kenny Payne	4–28	2–18	15th	
2023–24	Kenny Payne	8–24	3–17	15th	
Kenny Payne:		12–52	5–35		
Pat Kelsey (Atlantic Coast Conference) (2024–present)
2024–25	Pat Kelsey	27–8	18–2	T–2nd	NCAA Division I first round
2025–26	Pat Kelsey	24–11	11–7	6th	NCAA Division I second round
Pat Kelsey:		51–19	29–9		
Total:		1,926–999^{[Note G]}			
National champion Postseason invitational champion Conference regular season champion Conference regular season and conference tournament champion Division regular season champion Division regular season and conference tournament champion Conference tournament champion

^A. Adjusted record is 0–10 (30 wins vacated) and adjusted conference record is 0–8 (10 wins vacated)
^B. Adjusted record is 0–5 (35 wins vacated) and adjusted conference record is 0–4 (14 wins vacated)
^C. Louisville forfeited 123 wins during 2011–2014, its NCAA tournament appearances, and its 2013 National Championship title.
^D. Adjusted record is 0–6 (31 wins vacated) and adjusted conference record is 0–3 (15 wins vacated)
^E. Adjusted record is 0–9 (27 wins vacated) and adjusted conference record is 0–6 (12 wins vacated)
^F. Self–imposed post–season ban due to pending NCAA investigation
^G. Adjusted record is 1,772–962 as of the end of the 2022 season.
^H. Mack was suspended and later fired during the 2021–22 season. Mack's record was 6–8 (5–5 ACC), while Peagues was 7–11, (1–9 ACC).
