= 1986 Metro Conference men's basketball tournament =

- Classification: Division I
- Season: 1985–86
- Teams: 7
- Site: Freedom Hall; Louisville, KY
- Champions: Louisville (5th title)
- Winning coach: Denny Crum (5th title)
- MVP: Pervis Ellison (Louisville)
- Television: Raycom Sports

1985–86 Metro Conference men's basketball standings
	Conf.				Overall
Team	W		L	PCT	W		L	PCT
No. 7 Louisville †	10	–	2	.833	32	–	7	.821
No. 12 Memphis State	9	–	3	.750	28	–	6	.824
Virginia Tech	7	–	5	.583	22	–	9	.710
Southern Miss	6	–	6	.500	17	–	12	.586
Cincinnati	5	–	7	.417	12	–	16	.429
Florida State	3	–	9	.250	12	–	17	.414
South Carolina	2	–	10	.167	12	–	16	.429
† 1986 Metro Conference tournament winner Rankings from AP Poll

The 1986 Metro Conference men's basketball tournament was held March 6–8 at Freedom Hall in Louisville, Kentucky.

Louisville defeated Memphis State in the championship game, 88–79, to win their fifth Metro men's basketball tournament.

The Cardinals received an automatic bid to the 1986 NCAA Tournament, and would go on to win the National championship.

== Format ==
All seven of the conference's members participated. They were seeded based on regular season conference records, with the top team earning a bye into the semifinal round. The other six teams entered into the preliminary first round.

== Bracket ==
First round Thursday, March 6
4	Cincinnati	75
5	Southern Miss	74
3	Virginia Tech	84
6	Florida State	97
7	South Carolina	59
2	Memphis State	100

Semifinals; Friday, March 7
1	Louisville	86
4	Cincinnati	65
6	Florida State	71
2	Memphis State	73

Championship; Saturday, March 8
1	Louisville	88
2	Memphis State	79
