= 1986 NCAA Division I men's basketball championship game =

American college basketball final

1986 NCAA tournament championship game
National championship game
Louisville Cardinals	Duke Blue Devils
Metro	ACC
(31–7)	(37–2)
72	69
Head coach: Denny Crum	Head coach: Mike Krzyzewski
- AP: 7
- Coaches: 3
- AP: 1
- Coaches: 1
	1st half	2nd half	Total
Louisville Cardinals	34	38	72
Duke Blue Devils	37	32	69
- Date: March 31, 1986
- Venue: Reunion Arena, Dallas, Texas
- MVP: Pervis Ellison, Louisville
- Favorite: Duke by 1.5
- Referees: Hank Nichols, Don Rutledge, Pete Pavia
- Attendance: 16,493

United States TV coverage
- Network: CBS
- Announcers: Brent Musburger (play-by-play); Billy Packer (color)

The 1986 NCAA Division I men's basketball championship game was the finals of the 1986 NCAA Division I men's basketball tournament and it determined the national champion for the 1985–86 NCAA Division I men's basketball season The game was played on March 31, 1986, at Reunion Arena in Dallas, Texas, and featured the East Regional Champion, #1-seeded Duke and the West Regional Champion, #2-seeded Louisville.

This was the last national championship that was played in the Dallas-Fort Worth metroplex until 2014 which was played at AT&T Stadium in nearby Arlington, Texas due to the NCAA's preference for domed stadiums. This was also the last championship game to ever feature a team from the Metro Conference, which disbanded in 1995.

== Participating teams ==
=== Louisville Cardinals ===
- West
  - (2) Louisville 93, (15) Drexel 73
  - (2) Louisville 82, (7) Bradley 68
  - (2) Louisville 94, (3) North Carolina 79
  - (2) Louisville 84, (8) Auburn 76
- Final Four
  - (W2) Louisville 88, (SE11) LSU 77

=== Duke Blue Devils ===
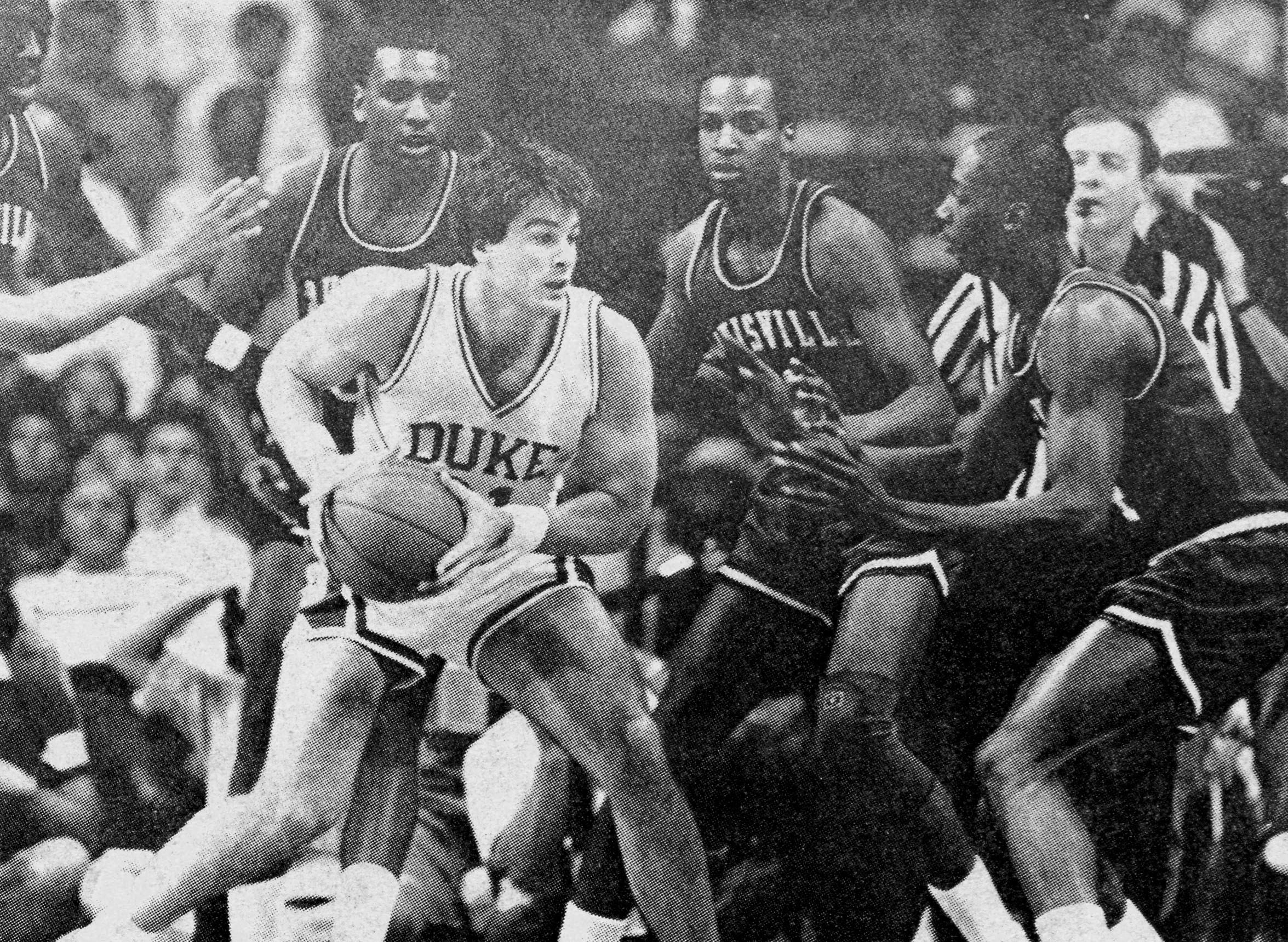
Duke's Jay Bilas surrounded by Louisville players

- East
  - (1) Duke (1) 85, (16) Mississippi Valley State 78
  - (1) Duke 89, (8) Old Dominion 61
  - (1) Duke 74, (12) DePaul 67
  - (1) Duke 71, (7) Navy 50
- Final Four
  - (E1) Duke 71, (MW1) Kansas 67

== Starting lineups ==
Louisville	Position	Duke
Milt Wagner	G	Tommy Amaker
Jeff Hall	G	† Johnny Dawkins
Herbert Crook	F	David Henderson
Billy Thompson	F	Mark Alarie
Pervis Ellison	C	Jay Bilas
† 1986 Consensus First Team All-American

== Game summary ==
External videos
- Full game broadcast by CBS on YouTube

CBS

Monday, March 31
8:00 p.m. CST

Box score

#W2 Louisville Cardinals 72, #E1 Duke Blue Devils 69
Pts: Pervis Ellison – 25; Rebs: Herbert Crook – 12; Asts: Herbert Crook – 5	Pts: Johnny Dawkins – 24; Rebs: Mark Alarie – 6 Asts: Tommy Amaker – 7 Halftime Score: Duke, 37–34

Reunion Arena – Dallas, Texas
Attendance: 16,493
Referees: Hank Nichols, Don Rutledge, Pete Pavia

== Aftermath ==
This was Louisville's last appearance in the Final Four until 2005, where they would lose to Illinois in the semifinal.

This also remains the last official national championship won by the Cardinals, along with their last official appearance in the championship game. They would return to the title game in 2013, where they defeated Michigan to win what was their third title. However, Louisville was forced to vacate their title due to a massive sex scandal involving players on the team, and as a result the Cardinals had four seasons from 2012 to 2015 wiped from the record books. The Cardinals became the first team to vacate a basketball national championship, and the second team overall to vacate a national championship in college sports after USC vacated its 2004 national championship after an investigation into the eligibility of Reggie Bush.
