= 1985–86 Miami Redskins men's basketball team =

American college basketball season

1985–86 Miami Redskins men's basketball

MAC Regular season champions

NCAA tournament
- Conference: Mid-American Conference
- Record: 24–7 (16–2 MAC)
- Head coach: Jerry Peirson (2nd season)
- Home arena: Millett Hall

1985–86 Mid-American Conference men's basketball standings
	Conf.				Overall
Team	W		L	PCT	W		L	PCT
Miami (OH)	16	–	2	.889	24	–	7	.774
Ohio	14	–	4	.778	22	–	8	.733
Ball State †	11	–	7	.611	21	–	10	.677
Northern Illinois	10	–	8	.556	15	–	12	.556
Toledo	8	–	10	.444	12	–	17	.414
Western Michigan	7	–	11	.389	12	–	16	.429
Central Michigan	7	–	11	.389	11	–	17	.393
Kent State	7	–	11	.389	11	–	16	.407
Eastern Michigan	5	–	13	.278	9	–	18	.333
Bowling Green	5	–	13	.278	7	–	20	.259
† 1986 MAC tournament winner Rankings from AP Poll

The 1985–86 Miami Redskins men's basketball team represent Miami University in the 1985–86 NCAA Division I men's basketball season. The Redskins, led by 2nd-year head coach Jerry Peirson, played their home games at Millett Hall in Oxford, Ohio as members of the Mid-American Conference. The team won the conference regular season title, but lost to Ball State in the championship game of the MAC tournament. The Redskins received an at-large bid to the NCAA tournament as the No. 10 seed in the Midwest region. Miami was beaten by the No. 7 seed Iowa State Cyclones in the opening round, 81–79 in OT on a buzzer beater by Jeff Hornacek. The Redskins did not fare well in overtime games this season as each one of their last four losses of the season was an overtime game.

Senior Ron Harper was again named MAC Player of the Year, and added to his list of school records. At the finish of the season, Harper owned school records for career points, rebounds, steals, and blocks. He was also fourth in career assists.

== Roster ==
1985–86 Miami RedHawks men's basketball team
Players
Coaches

Pos.	#	Name	Height	Weight	Year	Hometown
F	34	Ron Harper	6 ft 6 in (1.98 m)	195 lb (88 kg)	Sr	Dayton, Ohio
F		Karlton Clayborne	6 ft 6 in (1.98 m)	—	Fr
C		Rusty Doyle	6 ft 8 in (2.03 m)	—	Jr
F		Jeff Fuerst	6 ft 7 in (2.01 m)	—	So
F		Mike Hall	6 ft 6 in (1.98 m)	—	Jr
F		Lamont Hanna	6 ft 7 in (2.01 m)	—	So
F		Ron Hunter	6 ft 4 in (1.93 m)	—	Sr	Dayton, Ohio
C		Tim Lampe	6 ft 8 in (2.03 m)	—	Sr
G		Dernard Newell	6 ft 2 in (1.88 m)	—	Jr
G		Eric Newsome	5 ft 8 in (1.73 m)	—	Jr
F		Andy Ronan	6 ft 4 in (1.93 m)	—	Fr
G		Ed Schilling	6 ft 2 in (1.88 m)	—	So	Lebanon, Indiana
G		Todd Staker	6 ft 3 in (1.91 m)	—	So

Head coach

- Jerry Peirson

Assistant coach(es)

Legend

- (C) Team captain
- (S) Suspended
- (I) Ineligible
- (W) Walk-on
- Injured
- Current redshirt

== Schedule and results ==
Date time, TV	Rank^{#}	Opponent^{#}	Result	Record	Site (attendance) city, state
Non-conference regular season
Nov 22, 1985*		vs. No. 9 Louisville; Big Apple NIT	L 65–81	0–1	Riverfront Coliseum; Cincinnati, Ohio
Dec 2, 1985*		Centre	W 92–53	1–1	Millett Hall; Oxford, Ohio
Dec 4, 1985*		Dayton	W 70–57	2–1	Millett Hall; Oxford, Ohio
Dec 9, 1985*		at Eastern Kentucky	W 65–63	3–1	McBrayer Arena; Richmond, Kentucky
Dec 11, 1985*		Denison	W 80–55	4–1	Millett Hall; Oxford, Ohio
Dec 14, 1985*		Xavier	W 80–74	5–1	Millett Hall; Oxford, Ohio
Dec 21, 1985*		at Dayton	L 68–70	5–2	University of Dayton Arena; Dayton, Ohio
Dec 23, 1985*		at Cincinnati	W 63–62	6–2	Riverfront Coliseum; Cincinnati, Ohio
Dec 27, 1985*		vs. No. 19 Virginia Tech; Miller Classic	W 83–82	7–2	Sun Dome; Tampa, Florida
Dec 28, 1985*		at South Florida; Miller Classic	L 63–76	7–3	Sun Dome; Tampa, Florida
MAC regular season
Jan 2, 1986		Bowling Green	W 62–54	8–3 (1–0)	Millett Hall; Oxford, Ohio
Jan 4, 1986		at Eastern Michigan	W 63–52	9–3 (2–0)	Bowen Field House; Ypsilanti, Michigan
Jan 8, 1986		Toledo	W 80–51	10–3 (3–0)	Millett Hall; Oxford, Ohio
Jan 11, 1986		at Northern Illinois	L 75–77 ^{OT}	10–4 (3–1)	Chick Evans Fieldhouse; DeKalb, Illinois
Jan 15, 1986		Kent State	W 58–51	11–4 (4–1)	Millett Hall; Oxford, Ohio
Jan 18, 1986		at Ball State	W 73–59	12–4 (5–1)	Irving Gymnasium; Muncie, Indiana
Jan 22, 1986		at Ohio	W 85–68	13–4 (6–1)	Convocation Center; Athens, Ohio
Jan 25, 1986		Western Michigan	W 68–60	14–4 (7–1)	Millett Hall; Oxford, Ohio
Jan 29, 1986		at Central Michigan	W 62–55	15–4 (8–1)	Rose Arena; Mount Pleasant, Michigan
Feb 1, 1986		Eastern Michigan	W 102–68	16–4 (9–1)	Millett Hall; Oxford, Ohio
Feb 5, 1986		at Toledo	W 93–68	17–4 (10–1)	John F. Savage Hall; Toledo, Ohio
Feb 8, 1986		Northern Illinois	W 75–69	18–4 (11–1)	Millett Hall; Oxford, Ohio
Feb 12, 1986		at Kent State	W 77–69	19–4 (12–1)	Memorial Athletic and Convocation Center; Kent, Ohio
Feb 15, 1986		Ball State	W 103–77	20–4 (13–1)	Millett Hall; Oxford, Ohio
Feb 19, 1986		Ohio	L 79–80 ^{OT}	20–5 (13–2)	Millett Hall; Oxford, Ohio
Feb 22, 1986		at Western Michigan	W 81–73	21–5 (14–2)	University Arena; Kalamazoo, Michigan
Feb 26, 1986		Central Michigan	W 74–73	22–5 (15–2)	Millett Hall; Oxford, Ohio
Mar 1, 1986		at Bowling Green	W 91–79	23–5 (16–2)	Anderson Arena; Bowling Green, Ohio
MAC tournament
Mar 7, 1986*		vs. Toledo	W 93–76	24–5	Rockford MetroCentre; Rockford, Illinois
Mar 8, 1986*		vs. Ball State	L 79–87 ^{OT}	24–6	Rockford MetroCentre; Rockford, Illinois
NCAA tournament
Mar 14, 1986*	(10 MW)	vs. (7 MW) Iowa State; First Round	L 79–81 ^{OT}	24–7	Hubert H. Humphrey Metrodome; Minneapolis, Minnesota
*Non-conference game. ^{#}Rankings from AP poll. (#) Tournament seedings in parentheses. MW=Midwest. All times are in Eastern Time.

== Awards and honors ==
- Ron Harper – Consensus Second-team All-American, MAC Player of the Year (2x)

== 1986 NBA draft ==
Round	Pick	Player	NBA Team
1	8	Ron Harper	Cleveland Cavaliers
