= 1985–86 Virginia Tech Hokies men's basketball team =

American college basketball season

1985–86 Virginia Tech Hokies men's basketball

NCAA tournament
- Conference: Metro Conference (1975–1995)
- Record: 22–9 (7–5 Metro)
- Head coach: Charles Moir (10th season)
- Home arena: Cassell Coliseum

1985–86 Metro Conference men's basketball standings
	Conf.				Overall
Team	W		L	PCT	W		L	PCT
No. 7 Louisville †	10	–	2	.833	32	–	7	.821
No. 12 Memphis State	9	–	3	.750	28	–	6	.824
Virginia Tech	7	–	5	.583	22	–	9	.710
Southern Miss	6	–	6	.500	17	–	12	.586
Cincinnati	5	–	7	.417	12	–	16	.429
Florida State	3	–	9	.250	12	–	17	.414
South Carolina	2	–	10	.167	12	–	16	.429
† 1986 Metro Conference tournament winner Rankings from AP Poll

The 1985–86 Virginia Tech Hokies men's basketball team represented Virginia Polytechnic Institute and State University from Blacksburg, Virginia as members of the Metro Conference during the 1985–86 season. The Hokies were led by head coach Charles Moir and played their home games at Cassell Coliseum in Blacksburg, Virginia. After finishing third in the Metro regular season standings, Virginia Tech was knocked off in the quarterfinals of the conference tournament. The Hokies still secured an at-large bid to the NCAA tournament. As No. 7 seed in the Southeast region, the team was beaten by No. 10 seed and defending National champion Villanova in the opening round.

Senior guard Dell Curry ended his career with school records for points in a single season and career, both of which have been surpassed. Curry remains the school record holder for career steals. Curry was taken by the Utah Jazz with the 15th pick of the 1986 NBA draft. Though he only played one season in Utah, Curry would go on to have a 16-year career in the NBA.

== Roster ==
1985–86 Virginia Tech Hokies men's basketball team
Players	Coaches
Pos. / # / Name / Height / Weight / Year / Previous school / Hometown; G / 30 / Dell Curry / 6 ft 5 in (1.96 m) / 195 lb (88 kg) / Sr / Fort Defiance / Grottoes, VA	Head coach: Charles Moir (Appalachian State); Assistant coach(es) Legend: (C) Team captain; (S) Suspended; (I) Ineligible; (W) Walk-on; Injured; Current redshirt; Roster

== Schedule and results ==
Date time, TV	Rank^{#}	Opponent^{#}	Result	Record	Site city, state
Regular Season
Nov 22, 1985*		vs. No. 3 Michigan; Maui Invitational	L 66–67	0–1	Lahaina Civic Center; Lahaina, Hawaii
Nov 23, 1985*		at Chaminade; Maui Invitational	W 70–66	1–1	Lahaina Civic Center; Lahaina, Hawaii
Nov 25, 1985*		at USC	W 90–81	2–1	L.A. Sports Arena; Los Angeles, California
Nov 30, 1985*		at Old Dominion	W 90–76	3–1	Norfolk Scope; Norfolk, Virginia
Dec 4, 1985*		Coppin State	W 72–45	4–1	Cassell Coliseum; Blacksburg, Virginia
Dec 7, 1985*		VCU	W 78–52	5–1	Cassell Coliseum; Blacksburg, Virginia
Dec 10, 1985*		vs. Virginia	W 84–66	6–1	Roanoke Civic Center; Roanoke, Virginia
Dec 14, 1985*		at VCU	W 59–57	7–1	Richmond Coliseum; Richmond, Virginia
Dec 21, 1985*	No. 20	West Virginia	W 76–69	8–1	Cassell Coliseum; Blacksburg, Virginia
Dec 27, 1985*	No. 19	vs. Miami (OH); Miller Classic	L 82–83	8–2	Sun Dome; Tampa, Florida
Dec 28, 1985*	No. 19	vs. American; Miller Classic	W 95–67	9–2	Sun Dome; Tampa, Florida
Jan 2, 1986*		James Madison	W 74–65	10–2	Cassell Coliseum; Blacksburg, Virginia
Jan 4, 1986*	No. 20	Western Kentucky	W 85–71	11–2	Cassell Coliseum; Blacksburg, Virginia
Jan 8, 1986		Southern Miss	W 88–72	12–2 (1–0)	Cassell Coliseum; Blacksburg, Virginia
Jan 11, 1986		at South Carolina	W 71–69	13–2 (2–0)	Carolina Coliseum; Columbia, South Carolina
Jan 15, 1986*		at James Madison	W 73–65	14–2	JMU Convocation Center; Harrisonburg, Virginia
Jan 18, 1986		at Cincinnati	L 104–107	14–3 (2–1)	Riverfront Coliseum; Cincinnati, Ohio
Jan 22, 1986*		North Carolina A&T	W 79–75	15–3	Cassell Coliseum; Blacksburg, Virginia
Jan 25, 1986		Florida State	W 86–73	16–3 (3–1)	Cassell Coliseum; Blacksburg, Virginia
Jan 27, 1986	No. 16	at No. 2 Memphis State	L 61–83	16–4 (3–2)	Mid-South Coliseum; Memphis, Tennessee
Jan 30, 1986*	No. 16	No. 20 Richmond	W 71–67	17–4	Cassell Coliseum; Blacksburg, Virginia
Feb 1, 1986	No. 15	No. 3 Memphis State	W 76–72	18–4 (4–2)	Cassell Coliseum; Blacksburg, Virginia
Feb 6, 1986		at No. 16 Louisville	L 68–103	18–5 (4–3)	Freedom Hall; Louisville, Kentucky
Feb 10, 1986		No. 19 Louisville	L 83–93	18–6 (4–4)	Cassell Coliseum; Blacksburg, Virginia
Feb 15, 1986		South Carolina	W 92–78	19–6 (5–4)	Cassell Coliseum; Blacksburg, Virginia
Feb 19, 1986*		at VMI	W 88–73	20–6	Cameron Hall; Lexington, Virginia
Feb 22, 1986		at Southern Miss	L 66–69	20–7 (5–5)	Reed Green Coliseum; Hattiesburg, Mississippi
Feb 24, 1986		at Florida State	W 92–84	21–7 (6–5)	Tallahassee-Leon County Civic Center; Tallahassee, Florida
Feb 28, 1986		Cincinnati	W 83–71	22–7 (7–5)	Cassell Coliseum; Blacksburg, Virginia
Metro Tournament
Mar 6, 1986*	(3)	vs. (6) Florida State; First round	L 84–97	22–8	Freedom Hall; Louisville, Kentucky
NCAA Tournament
Mar 13, 1986*	(7 SE)	vs. (10 SE) Villanova; First Round	L 62–71	22–9	LSU Assembly Center; Baton Rouge, Louisiana
*Non-conference game. ^{#}Rankings from AP Poll. (#) Tournament seedings in parentheses. SE=Southeast. All times are in Eastern Time.

== Players in the 1986 NBA draft ==
Round	Pick	Player	NBA club
1	15	Dell Curry	Utah Jazz
