= 1986 NAIA women's basketball tournament =

- Teams: 16
- Finals site: , Kansas City, Missouri
- Champions: Francis Marion (1st title, 1st title game, 1st Fab Four)
- Runner-up: Wayland Baptist (1st title game, 2nd Fab Four)
- Semifinalists: Louisiana College (1st Fab Four); Georgia Southwestern (1st Fab Four)
- Coach of the year: Sylvia Rhyne Hatchell (Francis Marion)
- Charles Stevenson Hustle Award: Shelly Kay (Wayland Baptist)
- Chuck Taylor MVP: Tracey Tillman (Francis Marion)
- Top scorer: Janice Joseph (Louisiana College) (96 points)

The 1986 NAIA women's basketball tournament was the sixth annual tournament held by the NAIA to determine the national champion of women's college basketball among its members in the United States and Canada.

Francis Marion defeated Wayland Baptist in the championship game, 75–65, to claim the Patriots' first NAIA national title.

The tournament was played in Kansas City, Missouri.

== Qualification ==
The tournament field remained fixed at sixteen teams, with seeds assigned to the top eight teams.

The tournament utilized a simple single-elimination format, with an additional third-place game for the two teams that lost in the semifinals.

== Bracket ==
Round of 16
1	Francis Marion	109
Dominican (NY)	41
Wingate	71
8	Azusa Pacific	54
5	Georgia Southwestern	70
Ouachita Baptist	66
Wisconsin–Green Bay	48
4	Oklahoma Christian	78
3	Wayland Baptist	92
Charleston (WV)	78
Morningside	67
6	Saginaw Valley	69
7	Western Washington	72
Cumberland	54
Mount Marty	59
2	Louisiana College	89

Quarterfinals
1	Francis Marion	89
Wingate	71
5	Georgia Southwestern	86
4	Oklahoma Christian	78
3	Wayland Baptist	79
6	Saginaw Valley	72
7	Western Washington	75
2	Louisiana College	83

Semifinals
1	Francis Marion	91
5	Georgia Southwestern	77
3	Wayland Baptist	88
2	Louisiana College	81

National championship
1	Francis Marion	75
3	Wayland Baptist	65
National third place
5	Georgia Southwestern	78
2	Louisiana College	85

== See also ==
- 1986 NCAA Division I women's basketball tournament
- 1986 NCAA Division II women's basketball tournament
- 1986 NCAA Division III women's basketball tournament
- 1986 NAIA men's basketball tournament
