= 1985–86 Ball State Cardinals men's basketball team =

American college basketball season

1985–86 Ball State Cardinals men's basketball

MAC tournament champions

NCAA tournament
- Conference: Mid-American Conference
- Record: 21–10 (11–7 MAC)
- Head coach: Al Brown
- MVP: Dan Palombizio
- Home arena: Irving Gymnasium

1985–86 Mid-American Conference men's basketball standings
| | Conf. | | | | Overall |
| Team | W | | L | PCT | W | | L | PCT |
|---|---|---|---|---|---|---|---|---|
| Miami (OH) | 16 | – | 2 | .889 | 24 | – | 7 | .774 |
| Ohio | 14 | – | 4 | .778 | 22 | – | 8 | .733 |
| Ball State † | 11 | – | 7 | .611 | 21 | – | 10 | .677 |
| Northern Illinois | 10 | – | 8 | .556 | 15 | – | 12 | .556 |
| Toledo | 8 | – | 10 | .444 | 12 | – | 17 | .414 |
| Western Michigan | 7 | – | 11 | .389 | 12 | – | 16 | .429 |
| Central Michigan | 7 | – | 11 | .389 | 11 | – | 17 | .393 |
| Kent State | 7 | – | 11 | .389 | 11 | – | 16 | .407 |
| Eastern Michigan | 5 | – | 13 | .278 | 9 | – | 18 | .333 |
| Bowling Green | 5 | – | 13 | .278 | 7 | – | 20 | .259 |
† 1986 MAC tournament winner Rankings from AP Poll

The 1985–86 Ball State Cardinals men's basketball team represented Ball State University as a member of the Mid-American Conference during the 1985–86 NCAA Division I men's basketball season. The Cardinals were led by head coach Al Brown and played their home games at Irving Gymnasium in Muncie, Indiana. After finishing in third place during the MAC regular season, Ball State won the MAC tournament to receive the conference's automatic bid to the NCAA tournament. As No. 14 seed in the Southeast region, the Cardinals were beaten by No. 3 seed Memphis State in the opening round, 95–63. The team finished with a record of 21–10 (11–7 MAC).

== Roster ==
1985–86 Ball State Cardinals men's basketball team
Players
Coaches

| Pos. | # | Name | Height | Weight | Year | Previous school | Hometown |
|---|---|---|---|---|---|---|---|
| F | 5 | Dan Palombizio (C) | 6 ft 8 in (2.03 m) | — | Sr |
| | | Larry Reed (C) | — | — | Sr |
| | | Chris Shelton (C) | — | — | Sr |

Head coach

- Al Brown

Assistant coach(es)

Legend

- (C) Team captain
- (S) Suspended
- (I) Ineligible
- (W) Walk-on
- Injured
- Current redshirt

Roster

== Schedule and results ==
| Date time, TV | Rank^{#} | Opponent^{#} | Result | Record | Site city, state |
Non-conference regular season
| Dec 3, 1985* | | Oakland | W 82–69 | 1–0 | Irving Gymnasium; Muncie, Indiana |
| Dec 7, 1985* | | Butler | W 64–61 | 2–0 | Irving Gymnasium; Muncie, Indiana |
| Dec 11, 1985* | | at Indiana State | W 57–56 | 3–0 | Hulman Center; Terre Haute, Indiana |
| Dec 14, 1985* | | at Valparaiso | W 84–63 | 4–0 | Athletics-Recreation Center; Valparaiso, Indiana |
| Dec 18, 1985* | | Delaware State | W 91–69 | 5–0 | Irving Gymnasium; Muncie, Indiana |
| Dec 19, 1985* | | Mississippi Valley State | W 73–63 | 6–0 | Irving Gymnasium; Muncie, Indiana |
| Dec 21, 1985* | | Western Illinois | W 82–75 | 7–0 | Irving Gymnasium; Muncie, Indiana |
| Dec 27, 1985* | | at No. 12 UNLV | L 71–88 | 7–1 | Thomas & Mack Center; Las Vegas, Nevada |
| Dec 28, 1985* | | vs. TCU | L 64–81 | 7–2 | Thomas & Mack Center; Las Vegas, Nevada |
MAC regular season
| Jan 2, 1986 | | Eastern Michigan | W 70–59 | 8–2 (1–0) | Irving Gymnasium; Muncie, Indiana |
| Jan 4, 1986 | | at Toledo | L 68–70 | 8–3 (1–1) | John F. Savage Hall; Toledo, Ohio |
| Jan 8, 1986 | | Northern Illinois | W 84–74 | 9–3 (2–1) | Irving Gymnasium; Muncie, Indiana |
| Jan 11, 1986 | | at Kent State | W 70–61 | 10–3 (3–1) | Memorial Athletic and Convocation Center; Kent, Ohio |
| Jan 15, 1986 | | at Ohio | W 77–73 | 11–3 (4–1) | Convocation Center; Athens, Ohio |
| Jan 18, 1986 | | Miami (OH) | L 59–73 | 11–4 (4–2) | Irving Gymnasium; Muncie, Indiana |
| Jan 22, 1986 | | at Western Michigan | L 64–67 | 11–5 (4–3) | University Arena; Kalamazoo, Michigan |
| Jan 25, 1986 | | Central Michigan | W 58–56 | 12–5 (5–3) | Irving Gymnasium; Muncie, Indiana |
| Jan 29, 1986 | | at Bowling Green State | W 76–71 | 13–5 (6–3) | Anderson Arena; Bowling Green, Ohio |
| Feb 1, 1986* | | Toledo | W 67–57 | 14–5 (7–3) | Irving Gymnasium; Muncie, Indiana |
| Feb 5, 1986 | | at Northern Illinois | L 58–66 | 14–6 (7–4) | Chick Evans Fieldhouse; DeKalb, Illinois |
| Feb 8, 1986 | | Kent State | L 65–70 | 14–7 (7–5) | Irving Gymnasium; Muncie, Indiana |
| Feb 12, 1986 | | Ohio | L 61–64 | 14–8 (7–6) | Irving Gymnasium; Muncie, Indiana |
| Feb 15, 1986 | | at Miami (OH) | L 77–103 | 14–9 (7–7) | Millett Hall; Oxford, Ohio |
| Feb 19, 1986 | | Western Michigan | W 82–63 | 15–9 (8–7) | Irving Gymnasium; Muncie, Indiana |
| Feb 22, 1986 | | at Central Michigan | W 71–68 | 16–9 (9–7) | Rose Arena; Mount Pleasant, Michigan |
| Feb 28, 1986 | | Bowling Green State | W 85–78 | 17–9 (10–7) | Irving Gymnasium; Muncie, Indiana |
| Mar 1, 1986 | | at Eastern Michigan | W 81–80 | 18–9 (11–7) | Bowen Field House; Ypsilanti, Michigan |
MAC tournament
| Mar 6, 1986* | | vs. Western Michigan; Quarterfinals | W 87–76 | 19–9 | Rockford MetroCentre; Rockford, Illinois |
| Mar 7, 1986* | | vs. Ohio; Semifinals | W 93–69 | 20–9 | Rockford MetroCentre; Rockford, Illinois |
| Mar 8, 1986* | | vs. Miami (OH); Championship game | W 87–79 | 21–9 | Rockford MetroCentre; Rockford, Illinois |
NCAA tournament
| Mar 13, 1986* | (14 SE) | vs. (3 SE) No. 12 Memphis State; First Round | L 63–95 | 21–10 | LSU Assembly Center (13,749); Baton Rouge, Louisiana |
*Non-conference game. ^{#}Rankings from AP Poll. (#) Tournament seedings in parentheses. SE=Southeast. All times are in Eastern Time. Source
