= 1986 NCAA Division III women's basketball tournament =

- Teams: 32
- Finals site: , Salem, Massachusetts
- Champions: Salem State Vikings (1st title)
- Runner-up: Bishop Tigers (1st title game)
- Third place: Capital Crusaders (2nd Final Four)
- Fourth place: Rust Bearcats (1st Final Four)
- Winning coach: Tim Shea (1st title)

The 1986 NCAA Division III women's basketball tournament was the fifth annual tournament hosted by the NCAA to determine the national champion of Division III women's collegiate basketball in the United States.

Salem State defeated Bishop in the championship game, 89–85, to claim the Vikings' first Division III national title.

The championship rounds were hosted in Salem, Massachusetts.

== Bracket ==
=== First round ===
- NYU 70, Buffalo St. 65
- Albany (NY) 74, Columbia 67
- Salem St. 58, Bridgewater St. 47
- Emmanuel (MA) 59, Southern Me. 50
- St. Norbert 77, Susquehanna 63
- Wis.-Whitewater 71, Alma 65
- Rust 74, Chris. Newport 43
- UNC Greensboro 84, Va. Wesleyan 75
- Elizabethtown 70, Moravian 64
- Scranton 70, Juniata 53
- Kean 68, Ohio Northern 64
- Capital 84, Allegheny 66
- Eastern Conn. St. 71, Elmhurst 68
- William Penn 80, Carroll (WI) 68
- Bishop 83, Pomona-Pitzer 57
- Concordia-M’head 67, Saint Mary’s (MN) 63

=== Regional finals ===
- Albany (NY) 68, NYU 66
- Salem St. 77, Emmanuel (MA) 60
- Wis.-Whitewater 57, St. Norbert 56
- Rust 99, UNC Greensboro 61
- Elizabethtown 74, Scranton 60
- Capital 72, Kean 71 (OT)
- William Penn 75, Eastern Conn. St. 59
- Bishop 90, Concordia-M’head 86

=== National finals ===
National quarterfinals
Salem State	90
Albany	79
Rust	78
Wisconsin–Whitewater	64
Capital	61
Elizabethtown	55
Bishop	85
William Penn	77

National semifinals
Salem State	67
Rust	59
Capital	68
Bishop	73

National championship
Salem State	89
Bishop	85
National third-place game
Rust	61
Capital	77

== All-tournament team ==
- Evelyn Oquendo, Salem State
- Beth Kapnis, Salem State
- Crystal Coleman, Bishop
- Batavia Evans, Bishop
- Mary Fuhr, Capital

== See also ==
- 1986 NCAA Division III men's basketball tournament
- 1986 NCAA Division I women's basketball tournament
- 1986 NCAA Division II women's basketball tournament
- 1986 NAIA women's basketball tournament
