= 1985–86 Southern Miss Golden Eagles basketball team =

American college basketball season

1985–86 Southern Miss Golden Eagles men's basketball

NIT, First Round
- Conference: Metro Conference (1975–1995)
- Record: 12–2 (6–6 Metro)
- Head coach: M. K. Turk (10th season)
- Home arena: Reed Green Coliseum

1985–86 Metro Conference men's basketball standings
	Conf.				Overall
Team	W		L	PCT	W		L	PCT
No. 7 Louisville †	10	–	2	.833	32	–	7	.821
No. 12 Memphis State	9	–	3	.750	28	–	6	.824
Virginia Tech	7	–	5	.583	22	–	9	.710
Southern Miss	6	–	6	.500	17	–	12	.586
Cincinnati	5	–	7	.417	12	–	16	.429
Florida State	3	–	9	.250	12	–	17	.414
South Carolina	2	–	10	.167	12	–	16	.429
† 1986 Metro Conference tournament winner Rankings from AP Poll

The 1985–86 Southern Miss Golden Eagles basketball team represented University of Southern Mississippi in the 1985–86 college basketball season.

== Roster ==
1985–86 Southern Miss Golden Eagles men's basketball team
Players
Coaches

Pos.	#	Name	Height	Weight	Year	Hometown
G		Kenny Siler	6 ft 3 in (1.91 m)	—	Jr
F		Randolph Keys	6 ft 7 in (2.01 m)	195 lb (88 kg)	So	Collins, Mississippi
F		Derreck Hamilton	6 ft 7 in (2.01 m)	225 lb (102 kg)	So	Mobile, Alabama
G		Casey Fisher	6 ft 2 in (1.88 m)	—	So
F		John White	6 ft 7 in (2.01 m)	—	So
G		Michael Jett	6 ft 5 in (1.96 m)	—	Sr
C		Willie Brown	6 ft 7 in (2.01 m)	—	Fr
F		Jurado Hinton	6 ft 6 in (1.98 m)	—	Fr
C		John Ginley	6 ft 9 in (2.06 m)	—	Jr
F		Allen Chapman	6 ft 6 in (1.98 m)	—	Fr
F		Michael Keeler	6 ft 5 in (1.96 m)	—	Fr
F		D. J. Bowe	6 ft 7 in (2.01 m)	—	Fr

Head coach

- M. K. Turk

Assistant coach(es)

Legend

- (C) Team captain
- (S) Suspended
- (I) Ineligible
- (W) Walk-on
- Injured
- Current redshirt

Roster

== Schedule and results ==
Date time, TV	Rank^{#}	Opponent^{#}	Result	Record	Site city, state
Non-conference regular season
Nov 30, 1985*		Missouri–St. Louis	W 82–65	1–0	Reed Green Coliseum; Hattiesburg, Mississippi
Dec 2, 1985*		McNeese State	W 81–77	2–0	Reed Green Coliseum; Hattiesburg, Mississippi
Dec 7, 1985*		at Northeast Louisiana	W 69–68	3–0	Fant–Ewing Coliseum; Monroe, Louisiana
Dec 11, 1985*		Arkansas State	W 86–82	4–0	Reed Green Coliseum; Hattiesburg, Mississippi
Dec 13, 1985*		at South Alabama	W 84–82 ^{OT}	5–0	Jaguar Gym; Mobile, Alabama
Dec 16, 1985*		Tennessee Tech	W 106–93	6–0	Reed Green Coliseum; Hattiesburg, Mississippi
Dec 18, 1985*		Oregon Tech	W 101–72	7–0	Reed Green Coliseum; Hattiesburg, Mississippi
Dec 20, 1985*		at Jacksonville; Gator Bowl Tournament	L 66–80	7–1	Jacksonville Memorial Coliseum; Jacksonville, Florida
Dec 21, 1985*		vs. Texas A&M; Gator Bowl Tournament	L 61–81	7–2	Jacksonville Memorial Coliseum; Jacksonville, Florida
Dec 28, 1985*		at Arkansas State	L 71–80	7–3	Indian Field House; Jonesboro, Arkansas
Jan 2, 1986*		Fredonia State	W 90–59	8–3	Reed Green Coliseum; Hattiesburg, Mississippi
Metro Conference regular season
Jan 6, 1986		at Cincinnati	L 63–76	8–4 (0–1)	Riverfront Coliseum; Cincinnati, Ohio
Jan 8, 1986		at No. 19 Virginia Tech	L 72–88	8–5 (0–2)	Cassell Coliseum; Blacksburg, Virginia
Jan 13, 1986		No. 18 Louisville	L 54–59	8–6 (0–3)	Reed Green Coliseum; Hattiesburg, Mississippi
Jan 15, 1986*		at New Orleans	L 69–81	8–7	University of New Orleans Lakefront Arena; New Orleans, Louisiana
Jan 18, 1986		at Florida State	W 94–92	9–7 (1–3)	Tallahassee-Leon County Civic Center; Tallahassee, Florida
Jan 20, 1986		No. 2 Memphis State	L 64–68	9–8 (1–4)	Reed Green Coliseum; Hattiesburg, Mississippi
Jan 25, 1986		South Carolina	W 77–65	10–8 (2–4)	Reed Green Coliseum; Hattiesburg, Mississippi
Jan 30, 1986*		Illinois Wesleyan	W 95–88	11–8	Reed Green Coliseum; Hattiesburg, Mississippi
Feb 6, 1986*		Southwestern Louisiana	W 74–69	12–8	Reed Green Coliseum; Hattiesburg, Mississippi
Feb 8, 1986		Florida State	W 102–96	13–8 (3–4)	Reed Green Coliseum; Hattiesburg, Mississippi
Feb 10, 1986		at South Carolina	W 89–82	14–8 (4–4)	Carolina Coliseum; Columbia, South Carolina
Feb 15, 1986		at No. 4 Memphis State	L 85–92	14–9 (4–5)	Mid-South Coliseum; Memphis, Tennessee
Feb 17, 1986		at No. 16 Louisville	L 74–83	14–10 (4–6)	Freedom Hall; Louisville, Kentucky
Feb 22, 1986		No. 18 Virginia Tech	W 69–66	15–10 (5–6)	Reed Green Coliseum; Hattiesburg, Mississippi
Feb 24, 1986		Cincinnati	W 72–62	16–10 (6–6)	Reed Green Coliseum; Hattiesburg, Mississippi
Mar 1, 1986*		New Orleans	W 65–60	17–10	Reed Green Coliseum; Hattiesburg, Mississippi
Metro Conference tournament
Mar 6, 1986*	(5)	vs. (4) Cincinnati; First round	L 74–75	17–11	Freedom Hall; Louisville, Kentucky
NIT
Mar 13, 1986*		at Florida; First round	L 71–81	17–12	Florida Gymnasium; Gainesville, Florida
*Non-conference game. ^{#}Rankings from AP poll. (#) Tournament seedings in parentheses. All times are in Central Time.
