= 1986 MAC men's basketball tournament =

- Classification: Division I
- Season: 1985–86
- Teams: 7
- Finals site: Rockford MetroCentre; Rockford, IL
- Champions: Ball State (2nd title)
- Winning coach: Al Brown (1st title)
- MVP: Dan Palombizio (Ball State)
- MAC men's basketball tournaments

1985–86 Mid-American Conference men's basketball standings
	Conf.				Overall
Team	W		L	PCT	W		L	PCT
Miami (OH)	16	–	2	.889	24	–	7	.774
Ohio	14	–	4	.778	22	–	8	.733
Ball State †	11	–	7	.611	21	–	10	.677
Northern Illinois	10	–	8	.556	15	–	12	.556
Toledo	8	–	10	.444	12	–	17	.414
Western Michigan	7	–	11	.389	12	–	16	.429
Central Michigan	7	–	11	.389	11	–	17	.393
Kent State	7	–	11	.389	11	–	16	.407
Eastern Michigan	5	–	13	.278	9	–	18	.333
Bowling Green	5	–	13	.278	7	–	20	.259
† 1986 MAC tournament winner Rankings from AP Poll

The 1986 MAC men's basketball tournament was held March 6–8 at the Rockford MetroCentre in Rockford, Illinois. Third seeded Ball State defeated top-seeded Miami in the championship game by the score of 87–79 to win their second MAC men's basketball tournament and a bid to the NCAA tournament. There they lost to Memphis State in the first round. Dan Palombizio Ball State was named the tournament MVP.

== Format ==
Seven of the ten MAC teams participated. All games were played at the Rockford MetroCentre in Rockford, Illinois.

== Bracket ==
Quarterfinals; March 6
5	Toledo	82
4	Northern Illinois	79
3	Ball State	87
6	Western Michigan	76
7	Central Michigan	62
2	Ohio	66

Semifinals; March 7
1	Miami (OH)	93
5	Toledo	76
3	Ball State	93
2	Ohio	69

Final; March 8
1	Miami	79
3	Ball State	87
