= 1985 Maui Invitational =

1985 Maui Invitational Tournament
- Season: 1985–86
- Teams: 4
- Finals site: Lahaina Civic Center; Maui, Hawaii
- Champions: Michigan (1st title)
- Runner-up: Kansas State (1st title game)
- Semifinalists: Virginia Tech; Chaminade
- Winning coach: Bill Frieder (1st title)
- MVP: Dell Curry (Virginia Tech)

The 1985 Maui Invitational Tournament was the second edition of an early-season college basketball tournament that was played November 22–23, 1985. The tournament, which began the year prior in 1984, was part of the 1985-86 NCAA Division I men's basketball season. The tournament was played at the Lahaina Civic Center in Maui, Hawaii and was won by the Michigan. It was the first title for the program and its head coach Bill Frieder.

== Bracket ==
Semifinals; Friday, November 22
Chaminade	56
Kansas State	68
Virginia Tech	66
Michigan	67

Championship game Saturday, November 23
Kansas State	58
Michigan	70
Consolation; Saturday, November 23
Chaminade	66
Virginia Tech	70
