= 1985–86 Memphis State Tigers men's basketball team =

American college basketball season

1985–86 Memphis State Tigers men's basketball

NCAA tournament, Second round (vacated)
- Conference: Metro Conference (1975–1995)

Ranking
- Coaches: No. 12
- AP: No. 12
- Record: 27-5 (28–6 unadjusted) (9–3 Metro)
- Head coach: Dana Kirk (7th season)
- Assistant coaches: Larry Finch (6th season); Lee Fowler
- Home arena: Mid-South Coliseum

1985–86 Metro Conference men's basketball standings
	Conf.				Overall
Team	W		L	PCT	W		L	PCT
No. 7 Louisville †	10	–	2	.833	32	–	7	.821
No. 12 Memphis State	9	–	3	.750	28	–	6	.824
Virginia Tech	7	–	5	.583	22	–	9	.710
Southern Miss	6	–	6	.500	17	–	12	.586
Cincinnati	5	–	7	.417	12	–	16	.429
Florida State	3	–	9	.250	12	–	17	.414
South Carolina	2	–	10	.167	12	–	16	.429
† 1986 Metro Conference tournament winner Rankings from AP Poll

The 1985–86 Memphis State Tigers men's basketball team represented Memphis State University as a member of the Metro Conference during the 1985–86 NCAA Division I men's basketball season.

Memphis State opened the season with 20 consecutive wins and peaked at No. 2 in the AP poll on January 27, 1986. The team went on to finish second in the conference regular season standings and lost in the championship game of the conference tournament (eventual National champion Louisville won both titles). After reaching the Sweet 16 each of the previous four seasons including a Final Four appearance the year prior, the Tigers fell in the second round of the 1986 NCAA Tournament and finished with a 28–6 record (9–3 Metro).

== Roster ==
1985–86 Memphis State Tigers men's basketball team
Players
Coaches

Pos.	#	Name	Height	Weight	Year	Hometown
G	10	Andre Turner	5 ft 10 in (1.78 m)	165 lb (75 kg)	Sr	Memphis, Tennessee
G	20	John Wilfong	6 ft 3 in (1.91 m)	175 lb (79 kg)	Jr	Memphis, Tennessee
F	23	Vincent Robinson	6 ft 5 in (1.96 m)	195 lb (88 kg)	Fr	Bridgeport, Alabama
G	30	Vincent Askew	6 ft 6 in (1.98 m)	210 lb (95 kg)	So	Memphis, Tennessee
G	31	Dwight Boyd	6 ft 3 in (1.91 m)	190 lb (86 kg)	So	Memphis, Tennessee
F	32	Kenneth Moody	6 ft 6 in (1.98 m)	200 lb (91 kg)	Jr	Memphis, Tennessee
F	34	Aaron Price	6 ft 5 in (1.96 m)	185 lb (84 kg)	Sr	West Memphis, Arkansas
F	41	Rodney Douglas	6 ft 6 in (1.98 m)	180 lb (82 kg)	Fr	Memphis, Tennessee
C	42	DeWayne Bailey	6 ft 9 in (2.06 m)	225 lb (102 kg)	So	Memphis, Tennessee
F	43	Baskerville Holmes	6 ft 7 in (2.01 m)	195 lb (88 kg)	Sr	Memphis, Tennessee
F	44	David Jensen	6 ft 6 in (1.98 m)	215 lb (98 kg)	So	Greenville, South Carolina
C	50	William Bedford	7 ft 0 in (2.13 m)	225 lb (102 kg)	Jr	Memphis, Tennessee
F	51	Marvin Alexander	6 ft 7 in (2.01 m)	235 lb (107 kg)	Fr	Memphis, Tennessee

Head coach

- Dana Kirk (Marshall)

Assistant coach(es)

- Larry Finch (Memphis)
- Lee Fowler (Vanderbilt)

Legend

- (C) Team captain
- (S) Suspended
- (I) Ineligible
- (W) Walk-on
- Injured
- Current redshirt

Roster

== Schedule and results ==
Date time, TV	Rank^{#}	Opponent^{#}	Result	Record	Site city, state
Regular season
Nov 29, 1985*	No. 14	Tennessee State; Mid-South Classic	W 107–61	1–0	Mid-South Coliseum (11,200); Memphis, Tennessee
Nov 30, 1985*	No. 14	Middle Tennessee; Mid-South Classic	W 73–63	2–0	Mid-South Coliseum (11,200); Memphis, Tennessee
Dec 3, 1985*	No. 13	Kent State	W 83–69	3–0	Mid-South Coliseum (11,200); Memphis, Tennessee
Dec 6, 1985*	No. 13	at Hawaii–Hilo; Pearl Harbor Classic	W 95–52	4–0	George Q. Cannon Activities Center (1,000); Honolulu, Hawaii
Dec 7, 1985*	No. 13	vs. Fresno State; Pearl Harbor Classic	W 80–46	5–0	George Q. Cannon Activities Center (1,000); Honolulu, Hawaii
Dec 9, 1985*	No. 12	at Texas Tech	W 80–55	6–0	Lubbock Municipal Coliseum (5,680); Lubbock, Texas
Dec 14, 1985*	No. 12	South Carolina State	W 119–73	7–0	Mid-South Coliseum (11,200); Memphis, Tennessee
Dec 17, 1985*	No. 10	Ole Miss	W 73–56	8–0	Mid-South Coliseum (11,200); Memphis, Tennessee
Dec 23, 1985*	No. 10	Murray State	W 82–59	9–0	Mid-South Coliseum (11,200); Memphis, Tennessee
Dec 27, 1985*	No. 10	vs. Fresno State; Holiday Bowl Classic	W 57–46	10–0	San Diego Sports Arena (3,730); San Diego, California
Dec 28, 1985*	No. 10	vs. Charlotte; Holiday Bowl Classic	W 106–82	11–0	San Diego Sports Arena (3,548); San Diego, California
Jan 4, 1986*	No. 9	No. 5 Kansas	W 83–80 ^{OT}	12–0	Mid-South Coliseum (11,200); Memphis, Tennessee
Jan 6, 1986	No. 6	South Carolina	W 89–81	13–0 (1–0)	Mid-South Coliseum (11,200); Memphis, Tennessee
Jan 9, 1986	No. 6	No. 17 Louisville	W 73–71	14–0 (2–0)	Mid-South Coliseum (11,200); Memphis, Tennessee
Jan 11, 1986*	No. 6	Arkansas State	W 87–64	15–0	Mid-South Coliseum (11,200); Memphis, Tennessee
Jan 15, 1986	No. 6	at Cincinnati	W 89–71	16–0 (3–0)	Riverfront Coliseum (6,456); Cincinnati, Ohio
Jan 18, 1986*	No. 6	at New Orleans	W 68–64	17–0	University of New Orleans Lakefront Arena (6,554); New Orleans, Louisiana
Jan 20, 1986	No. 2	at Southern Miss	W 68–64	18–0 (4–0)	Reed Green Coliseum (7,758); Hattiesburg, Mississippi
Jan 25, 1986*	No. 3	Missouri	W 79–68	19–0	Mid-South Coliseum (11,200); Memphis, Tennessee
Jan 27, 1986	No. 2	No. 16 Virginia Tech	W 83–61	20–0 (5–0)	Mid-South Coliseum (11,200); Memphis, Tennessee
Feb 1, 1986	No. 3	at No. 15 Virginia Tech	L 72–76	20–1 (5–1)	Cassell Coliseum (10,000); Blacksburg, Virginia
Feb 3, 1986	No. 3	Cincinnati	W 74–55	21–1 (6–1)	Mid-South Coliseum (11,200); Memphis, Tennessee
Feb 8, 1986*	No. 3	at No. 9 UNLV	L 66–67	21–2	Thomas & Mack Center (18,832); Las Vegas, Nevada
Feb 10, 1986	No. 4	Florida State	W 99–73	22–2 (7–1)	Mid-South Coliseum (11,200); Memphis, Tennessee
Feb 15, 1986	No. 4	Southern Miss	W 92–85	23–2 (8–1)	Mid-South Coliseum (11,200); Memphis, Tennessee
Feb 22, 1986	No. 4	at Florida State	L 80–82	23–3 (8–2)	Tallahassee-Leon County Civic Center (2,671); Tallahassee, Florida
Feb 24, 1986	No. 7	at South Carolina	W 86–73	24–3 (9–2)	Carolina Coliseum (7,325); Columbia, South Carolina
Feb 27, 1986*	No. 7	New Orleans	W 63–52	25–3	Mid-South Coliseum (11,200); Memphis, Tennessee
Mar 2, 1986	No. 7	at No. 13 Louisville	L 69–70	25–4 (9–3)	Freedom Hall (19,582); Louisville, Kentucky
Metro Conference Tournament
Mar 6, 1986*	(2) No. 10	vs. (7) South Carolina; Quarterfinals	W 100–59	26–4	Freedom Hall (19,083); Louisville, Kentucky
Mar 7, 1986*	(2) No. 10	vs. (6) Florida State; Semifinals	W 73–71	27–4	Freedom Hall (19,452); Louisville, Kentucky
Mar 8, 1986*	(2) No. 10	at (1) No. 11 Louisville; Championship game	L 79–88	27–5	Freedom Hall (19,611); Louisville, Kentucky
NCAA Tournament
Mar 13, 1986*	(3 SE) No. 12	vs. (14 SE) Ball State; First round	W 95–63	28–5	LSU Assembly Center (13,749); Baton Rouge, Louisiana
Mar 15, 1986*	(3 SE) No. 12	at (11 SE) LSU; Second round	L 81–83	28–6	LSU Assembly Center (13,749); Baton Rouge, Louisiana
*Non-conference game. ^{#}Rankings from AP Poll. (#) Tournament seedings in parentheses. SE=Southeast region. All times are in Eastern Time.
