= 1985–86 Ohio Bobcats men's basketball team =

American college basketball season

1985–86 Ohio Bobcats men's basketball

National Invitation Tournament, First Round
- Conference: Mid-American Conference
- Record: 22–8 (14–4 MAC)
- Head coach: Danny Nee (6th season)
- Home arena: Convocation Center

1985–86 Mid-American Conference men's basketball standings
	Conf.				Overall
Team	W		L	PCT	W		L	PCT
Miami (OH)	16	–	2	.889	24	–	7	.774
Ohio	14	–	4	.778	22	–	8	.733
Ball State †	11	–	7	.611	21	–	10	.677
Northern Illinois	10	–	8	.556	15	–	12	.556
Toledo	8	–	10	.444	12	–	17	.414
Western Michigan	7	–	11	.389	12	–	16	.429
Central Michigan	7	–	11	.389	11	–	17	.393
Kent State	7	–	11	.389	11	–	16	.407
Eastern Michigan	5	–	13	.278	9	–	18	.333
Bowling Green	5	–	13	.278	7	–	20	.259
† 1986 MAC tournament winner Rankings from AP Poll

The 1985–86 Ohio Bobcats men's basketball team represented Ohio University as a member of the Mid-American Conference in the college basketball season of 1985–86. The team was coached by Danny Nee in his sixth and final season at Ohio. They played their home games at Convocation Center. The Bobcats finished with a record of 22–8 and finished second in MAC regular season with a conference record of 14–4. They lost in the semifinals of the MAC tournament to Ball State. They received a bid to the Postseason NIT. There they lost to Ohio State in the first round. After the season Danny Nee took the head coaching job at Nebraska. He was replaced by Billy Hahn.

== Schedule ==
Date time, TV	Rank^{#}	Opponent^{#}	Result	Record	Site (attendance) city, state
Non-conference regular season
11/30/1985*		Capital	W 92–58	1–0	
12/3/1985*		Marshall	W 85–79	2–0	
12/6/1985*		vs. Navy; Carrier Classic	L 62–73	2–1	Carrier Dome; Syracuse, NY
12/7/1985*		vs. La Salle; Carrier Classic	W 70–65	3–1	
12/9/1985*		at Hofstra	W 73–66	4–1	
12/11/1985*		at Wagner	W 70–57	5–1	
12/14/1985*		at No. 1 North Carolina	L 57–99	5–2	Carmichael Auditorium; Chapel Hill, NC
12/21/1985*		at St. Francis (PA)	W 99–78	6–2	
12/30/1985*		Marietta	W 90–66	7–2	
MAC regular season
1/2/1986		at Northern Illinois	W 68–63	8–2 (1–0)	
1/4/1986		at Central Michigan	W 78–61	9–2 (2–0)	
1/8/1986		Kent State	W 91–76	10–2 (3–0)	
1/11/1986		at Bowling Green	L 75–77	10–3 (3–1)	
1/15/1986		Ball State	L 73–77	10–4 (3–2)	
1/18/1986		at Eastern Michigan	W 77–74	11-4 (4–2)	
1/22/1986		Miami (OH)	L 65–85	11-5 (4–3)	
1/25/1986		at Toledo	L 98–100	11–6 (4–4)	
1/29/1986		Western Michigan	W 85–62	12–6 (5–4)	
2/1/1986		Central Michigan	W 79–57	13–6 (6–4)	
2/5/1986		at Kent State	W 68–63	14–6 (7–4)	
2/8/1986		Bowling Green	W 74–57	15–6 (8–4)	
2/12/1986		at Ball State	W 63–61	16–6 (9–4)	
2/15/1986		Eastern Michigan	W 81–69	17–6 (10–4)	
2/19/1986		at Miami (OH)	W 80–79 ^{OT}	18–6 (11–4)	
2/22/1986		Toledo	W 74–63	19–6 (12–4)	
2/26/1986		at Western Michigan	W 81–75	20–6 (13–4)	
3/1/1986		Northern Illinois	W 83–64	21–6 (14–4)	
MAC tournament
3/6/1986		vs. Central Michigan; Quarterfinal	W 66–62	22–6 (15–4)	
3/7/1986		vs. Ball State; Semifinal	L 69–93	22–7 (15–5)	
NIT
3/14/1986*		vs. Ohio State; First Round	L 62–65	22–8	Convocation Center; Athens, Ohio
*Non-conference game. ^{#}Rankings from AP Poll. (#) Tournament seedings in parentheses. All times are in Eastern Time.

== Statistics ==
=== Team statistics ===
Final 1985–86 statistics

Record	Ohio	OPP
Scoring	2314	2124
Scoring Average	77.13	70.80
Field goals – Att	932–1828	815–1721
Free throws – Att	450–687	494–725
Rebounds	1066	1022
Assists	520	435
Turnovers	415	468
Steals	268	189
Blocked Shots	77	83

=== Player statistics ===
			Minutes		Scoring		Total FGs			Free-Throws			Rebounds						
Player	GP	GS	Tot	Avg	Pts	Avg	FG	FGA	Pct	FT	FTA	Pct	Tot	Avg	A	PF	TO	Stl	Blk
Robert Tatum	30	30	1007	33.6	516	17.2	212	403	0.526	92	126	0.730	56	1.9	90	61	57	56	2
Paul Graham	29	16	757	26.1	461	15.9	181	377	0.480	99	128	0.773	136	4.7	52	89	61	41	15
Dave Jamerson	28	3	668	23.9	392	14.0	169	294	0.575	54	65	0.831	85	3.0	54	51	42	47	0
John Rhodes	29	20	755	26.0	266	9.2	110	196	0.561	46	95	0.484	197	6.8	13	109	55	16	46
Paul Baron	30	29	945	31.5	237	7.9	90	194	0.464	57	95	0.600	134	4.5	113	95	86	52	0
Roger Smith	30	27	712	23.7	139	4.6	54	119	0.454	31	49	0.633	63	2.1	113	67	61	39	1
Marty Lehmann	30	9	614	20.5	132	4.4	54	118	0.458	24	43	0.558	131	4.4	8	62	26	12	1
Jamie Brock	19	6	163	8.6	51	2.7	23	40	0.575	5	12	0.417	24	1.3	2	17	5	1	2
George Reid	21	0	172	8.2	42	2.0	10	23	0.435	22	31	0.710	28	1.3	2	38	9	3	1
Rich Stanfel	23	10	289	12.6	41	1.8	16	26	0.615	9	27	0.333	73	3.2	1	52	13	6	7
Steve Bruning	15	0	160	10.7	37	2.5	13	34	0.382	11	14	0.786	31	2.1	9	18	5	7	2
Nick Davis	3	0	7	2.3	0	0.0	0	4	0.000	0	2	0.000	7	2.3	0	1	3	0	0
Total	30	-	0	-	2314	77.1	932	1828	0.510	450	687	0.655	1066	35.5	520	656	415	268	77
Opponents	30	-	0	-	2124	70.8	815	1721	0.474	494	725	0.681	1022	34.1	435	606	468	189	83

Legend
GP	Games played	GS	Games started	Avg	Average per game
FG	Field-goals made	FGA	Field-goal attempts	Off	Offensive rebounds
Def	Defensive rebounds	A	Assists	TO	Turnovers
Blk	Blocks	Stl	Steals	High	Team high
