= 1985–86 Louisville Cardinals men's basketball team =

American college basketball season

1985–86 Louisville Cardinals men's basketball

NCAA tournament National Champions Metro Conference tournament champions Metro Conference regular season champions

National Championship Game, W 72–69 vs. Duke
- Conference: Metro Conference (1975–1995)

Ranking
- Coaches: No. 7
- AP: No. 7
- Record: 32–7 (10–2 Metro)
- Head coach: Denny Crum (15th season)
- Assistant coaches: Wade Houston; Jerry Jones; Bobby Dotson
- Home arena: Freedom Hall

1985–86 Metro Conference men's basketball standings
	Conf.				Overall
Team	W		L	PCT	W		L	PCT
No. 7 Louisville †	10	–	2	.833	32	–	7	.821
No. 12 Memphis State	9	–	3	.750	28	–	6	.824
Virginia Tech	7	–	5	.583	22	–	9	.710
Southern Miss	6	–	6	.500	17	–	12	.586
Cincinnati	5	–	7	.417	12	–	16	.429
Florida State	3	–	9	.250	12	–	17	.414
South Carolina	2	–	10	.167	12	–	16	.429
† 1986 Metro Conference tournament winner Rankings from AP Poll

The 1985–86 Louisville Cardinals men's basketball team represented the University of Louisville during the 1985–86 NCAA Division I men's basketball season, Louisville's 72nd season of intercollegiate competition. The Cardinals competed in the Metro Conference and were coached by Denny Crum. The team played home games at Freedom Hall.

The team compiled a 32–7 record and brought Louisville basketball their second NCAA national championship when they defeated Duke, 72–69.

== Roster ==
1985–86 Louisville Cardinals men's basketball team
Players
Coaches

Pos.	#	Name	Height	Weight	Year	Previous school	Hometown
G/F	34	Mike Abram	6 ft 4 in (1.93 m)	195 lb (88 kg)	So	Northside	Muncie, Indiana
F	41	Herbert Crook	6 ft 7 in (2.01 m)	190 lb (86 kg)	So	Eastern	Louisville, Kentucky
F/C	43	Pervis Ellison	6 ft 9 in (2.06 m)	195 lb (88 kg)	Fr	Savannah	Savannah, Georgia
G	42	Jeff Hall	6 ft 4 in (1.93 m)	180 lb (82 kg)	Sr	Fairview	Ashland, Kentucky
F	44	Tony Kimbro	6 ft 7 in (2.01 m)	190 lb (86 kg)	Fr	Seneca	Louisville, Kentucky
F/C	33	Avery Marshall	6 ft 7 in (2.01 m)	210 lb (95 kg)	Fr	Myrtle Beach	Myrtle Beach, South Carolina
F/C	10	Mark McSwain	6 ft 7 in (2.01 m)	220 lb (100 kg)	Jr	St. Pius X	Atlanta, Georgia
F	24	Will Olliges	6 ft 9 in (2.06 m)	205 lb (93 kg)	So	St.Xavier	Louisville, Kentucky
F	21	Kenny Payne	6 ft 7 in (2.01 m)	195 lb (88 kg)	Fr	Northeast Jones	Laurel, Mississippi
F	30	David Robinson	6 ft 8 in (2.03 m)	190 lb (86 kg)	Fr	Eastside	Gainesville, Florida
F	55	Billy Thompson	6 ft 7 in (2.01 m)	195 lb (88 kg)	Sr	Camden	Camden, New Jersey
F	00	Robbie Valentine	6 ft 6 in (1.98 m)	200 lb (91 kg)	Sr	North Hardin	Radcliff, Kentucky
G	20	Milt Wagner	6 ft 5 in (1.96 m)	185 lb (84 kg)	Sr	Camden	Camden, New Jersey
G	15	Kevin Walls	6 ft 1 in (1.85 m)	170 lb (77 kg)	Fr	Camden	Camden, New Jersey
G	23	Chris West	6 ft 3 in (1.91 m)	175 lb (79 kg)	Jr	Manual	Louisville, Kentucky
G	22	Keith Williams	6 ft 4 in (1.93 m)	180 lb (82 kg)	Fr	Seneca	Louisville, Kentucky

Head coach

- Denny Crum (UCLA)

Assistant coach(es)

- Jerry Jones

Legend

- (C) Team captain
- (S) Suspended
- (I) Ineligible
- (W) Walk-on
- Injured
- Current redshirt

== Schedule and results ==
Date time, TV	Rank^{#}	Opponent^{#}	Result	Record	Site city, state
Regular Season
Nov 22, 1985*	No. 9	vs. Miami (OH); Preseason NIT	W 81–65	1–0	Riverfront Coliseum; Cincinnati, Ohio
Nov 24, 1985*	No. 9	vs. Tulsa; Preseason NIT	W 80–74	2–0	Riverfront Coliseum; Cincinnati, Ohio
Nov 29, 1985*	No. 9	vs. No. 5 Kansas; Preseason NIT	L 78–83	2–1	Madison Square Garden; New York, New York
Dec 1, 1985*	No. 9	at No. 18 St. John's; Preseason NIT	L 79–86	2–2	Madison Square Garden; New York, New York
Dec 7, 1985*	No. 16	Purdue	W 77–58	3–2	Freedom Hall; Louisville, Kentucky
Dec 10, 1985*	No. 15	Iona	W 88–75	4–2	Freedom Hall; Louisville, Kentucky
Dec 14, 1985*	No. 15	Western Kentucky	W 73–70	5–2	Freedom Hall; Louisville, Kentucky
Dec 18, 1985*	No. 16	No. 17 Indiana	W 65–63	6–2	Freedom Hall; Louisville, Kentucky
Dec 28, 1985*	No. 15	at No. 13 Kentucky	L 64–69	6–3	Rupp Arena; Lexington, Kentucky
Jan 4, 1986*	No. 18	Wyoming	W 94–62	7–3	Freedom Hall; Louisville, Kentucky
Jan 6, 1986*	No. 17	Eastern Kentucky	W 86–55	8–3	Freedom Hall; Louisville, Kentucky
Jan 9, 1986	No. 17	at No. 6 Memphis State	L 71–73	8–4 (0–1)	Mid-South Coliseum; Memphis, Tennessee
Jan 13, 1986	No. 18	at Southern Miss	W 59–54	9–4 (1–1)	Reed Green Coliseum; Hattiesburg, Mississippi
Jan 15, 1986	No. 18	at Florida State	W 85–64	10–4 (2–1)	Donald L. Tucker Center; Tallahassee, Florida
Jan 18, 1986*	No. 13	No. 4 Syracuse	W 83–73	11–4	Freedom Hall; Louisville, Kentucky
Jan 20, 1986	No. 13	Cincinnati	L 82–84	11–5 (2–2)	Freedom Hall; Louisville, Kentucky
Jan 25, 1986*	No. 13	at No. 7 Kansas	L 69–71	11–6	Allen Fieldhouse; Lawrence, Kansas
Jan 28, 1986*	No. 18	La Salle	W 72–60	12–6	Freedom Hall; Louisville, Kentucky
Feb 1, 1986*	No. 18	UCLA	W 91–72	13–6	Freedom Hall (19,384); Louisville, Kentucky
Feb 3, 1986	No. 16	South Carolina	W 74–72	14–6 (3–2)	Freedom Hall; Louisville, Kentucky
Feb 6, 1986	No. 16	No. 15 Virginia Tech	W 103–68	15–6 (4–2)	Freedom Hall; Louisville, Kentucky
Feb 8, 1986*	No. 16	at NC State	L 64–76	15–7	Reynolds Coliseum; Raleigh, North Carolina
Feb 10, 1986	No. 19	at No. 20 Virginia Tech	W 93–83	16–7 (5–2)	Cassell Coliseum; Blacksburg, Virginia
Feb 13, 1986	No. 19	at Cincinnati	W 74–58	17–7 (6–2)	Riverfront Coliseum; Cincinnati, Ohio
Feb 15, 1986*	No. 19	at DePaul	W 72–53	18–7	Rosemont Horizon (15,754); Rosemont, Illinois
Feb 17, 1986	No. 16	Southern Miss	W 83–74	19–7 (7–2)	Freedom Hall; Louisville, Kentucky
Feb 19, 1986	No. 16	Florida State	W 89–67	20–7 (8–2)	Freedom Hall; Louisville, Kentucky
Feb 22, 1986*	No. 16	at Houston	W 76–59	21–7	Hofheinz Pavilion; Houston, Texas
Feb 24, 1986*	No. 13	South Alabama	W 66–55	22–7	Freedom Hall; Louisville, Kentucky
Feb 26, 1986	No. 13	at South Carolina	W 65–63	23–7 (9–2)	Carolina Coliseum; Columbia, South Carolina
Mar 2, 1986	No. 13	No. 7 Memphis State	W 70–69	24–7 (10–2)	Freedom Hall; Louisville, Kentucky
Metro Conference tournament
Mar 7, 1986*	(1) No. 11	(4) Cincinnati; Semifinals	W 86–65	25–7	Freedom Hall; Louisville, Kentucky
Mar 8, 1986*	(1) No. 11	(2) No. 10 Memphis State; Championship	W 88–79	26–7	Freedom Hall; Louisville, Kentucky
NCAA Tournament
Mar 13, 1986*	(2 W) No. 7	vs. (15 W) Drexel; First round	W 93–73	27–7	Dee Events Center (9,037); Ogden, Utah
Mar 15, 1986*	(2 W) No. 7	vs. (7 W) No. 14 Bradley; Second Round	W 82–68	28–7	Dee Events Center (10,061); Ogden, Utah
Mar 20, 1986*	(2 W) No. 7	vs. (3 W) No. 8 North Carolina; Regional semifinal – Sweet Sixteen	W 94–79	29–7	The Summit; Houston, Texas
Mar 22, 1986*	(2 W) No. 7	vs. (8 W) Auburn; Regional Final – Elite Eight	W 84–76	30–7	The Summit; Houston, Texas
Mar 29, 1986*	(2 W) No. 7	vs. (11 SE) LSU; National semifinal – Final Four	W 88–77	31–7	Reunion Arena; Dallas, Texas
Mar 31, 1986*	(2 W) No. 7	vs. (1 E) No. 1 Duke; National Championship Game	W 72–69	32–7	Reunion Arena (16,493); Dallas, Texas
*Non-conference game. ^{#}Rankings from AP poll. (#) Tournament seedings in parentheses. W=West. All times are in Eastern Time.

== NCAA basketball tournament ==
=== West region ===
First round
1	St John's	83
16	Montana St	74
8	Auburn	73
9	Arizona	63
5	Maryland	69
12	Pepperdine	64
4	UNLV	74
13	Northeast Louisiana	51
6	UAB	66
11	Missouri	64
3	North Carolina	84
14	Utah	72
7	Bradley	83
10	UTEP	65
2	Louisville	93
15	Drexel	73

Quarter-finals
1	St John's	65
8	Auburn	81
5	Maryland	64
4	UNLV	70
6	UAB	59
3	North Carolina	77
7	Bradley	68
2	Louisville	82

Regional semifinals
8	Auburn	70
4	UNLV	63
3	North Carolina	79
2	Louisville	94

Regional Finals
8	Auburn	76
2	Louisville	84

=== Final Four ===
National semifinals
E1	Duke	71
M1	Kansas	67
S11	LSU	77
W2	Louisville	88

National Championship Game
E1	Duke	69
W2	Louisville	72

== Awards and honors ==
- Billy Thompson, first team All-Metro Conference
- Billy Thompson, AP honorable mention All-American
- Billy Thompson, NCAA All-Tournament team
- Billy Thompson, NCAA All-West regional
- Milt Wagner, first team All-Metro Conference
- Milt Wagner. AP honorable mention All-American
- Pervis Ellison, Final Four Most Outstanding Player
- Pervis Ellison, NCAA All-West regional
- Pervis Ellison, Metro Conference Freshman of the Year
- Pervis Ellison, second team All-Metro Conference
- Herbert Crook, NCAA All-West regional
- Tony Kimbro, Metro Conference All-Freshman team

== Team players drafted into the NBA ==
Year	Round	Pick	Player	NBA club
1986	1	19	Billy Thompson	Atlanta Hawks
1986	2	35	Milt Wagner	Dallas Mavericks
1986	6	118	Jeff Hall	Indiana Pacers
1988	3	61	Herbert Crook	Indiana Pacers
1989	1	1	Pervis Ellison	Sacramento Kings
1989	1	19	Kenny Payne	Philadelphia 76ers
