= 1986 NCAA Division III men's basketball tournament =

American collegiate men's basketball tournament (1986)

- Finals site: , Grand Rapids, Michigan
- Champions: Potsdam State Bears (2nd title)
- Runner-up: LeMoyne-Owen Magicians (2nd title game)
- Semifinalists: Nebraska Wesleyan Prairie Wolves (2nd Final Four); Jersey City State Gothic Knights (1st Final Four)
- Winning coach: Jerry Welsh (Potsdam State)
- MOP: Roosevelt Bullock (Potsdam State)
- Attendance: 34,366

The 1986 NCAA Division III men's basketball tournament was the 12th annual single-elimination tournament to determine the national champions of National Collegiate Athletic Association (NCAA) men's Division III collegiate basketball in the United States.

Held during March 1986, the field included thirty-two teams and the final championship rounds were contested at Calvin College in Grand Rapids, Michigan.

SUNY Potsdam defeated LeMoyne–Owen, 76–73, to claim their second NCAA Division III national title and first since 1981. The Bears also completed an undefeated season (32–0), the first Division III program to complete this feat.

== Bracket ==
=== Regionals ===
First Round
Clark	71
Salem State	73
SE Massachusetts	64
Western Connecticut State	62

Regional Championship
Salem State	66
SE Massachusetts	81
Regional Third-place
Clark	78
Western Connecticut State	77

First Round
Jersey City State	67
Roanoke	61
Trenton State	64
Upsala	66

Regional Championship
Jersey City State	69
Upsala	64
Regional Third-place
Roanoke	55
Trenton State	58

First Round
Alfred	88
Nazareth	86
NYU	67
Potsdam	83

Regional Championship
Alfred	51
Potsdam	80
Regional Third-place
Nazareth	87
NYU	73

First Round
DePauw	69
Wittenberg	55
Calvin	84
Otterbein	100

Regional Championship
DePauw	76
Otterbein	82
Regional Third-place
Wittenberg	84
Calvin	77

First Round
North Park	65
Ripon	68
Illinois Wesleyan	79
Wisconsin–Whitewater	75

Regional Championship
Ripon	57
Illinois Wesleyan	63
Regional Third-place
North Park	73
Wisconsin–Whitewater	89

First Round
John Carroll	78
LeMoyne–Owen	92
Centre (KY)	70
Christopher Newport	62

Regional Championship
LeMoyne–Owen	72
Centre (KY)	69
Regional Third-place
John Carroll	73
Christopher Newport	75

First Round
Nebraska Wesleyan	89
Pomona-Pitzer	59
Dubuque	71
Saint John's (MN)	47

Regional Championship
Nebraska Wesleyan	61
Dubuque	50
Regional Third-place
Pomona-Pitzer	52
Saint John's (MN)	71

First Round
Susquehanna	79
Washington College	75
Franklin & Marshall	61
Scranton	57

Regional Championship
Susquehanna	79
Franklin & Marshall	72
Regional Third-place
Washington College	94
Scranton	78

=== National finals ===
National quarterfinals
Potsdam	80
Susquehanna	65
Jersey City State	83
SE Massachusetts	69
Illinois Wesleyan	85
LeMoyne–Owen	93
Nebraska Wesleyan	87*
Otterbein	82

National semifinals
Potsdam	91
Jersey City State	89
LeMoyne–Owen	86
Nebraska Wesleyan	80

National championship
Potsdam	76
LeMoyne–Owen	73
National third-place game
Jersey City State	93
Nebraska Wesleyan	97

== All-tournament team ==
- Roosevelt Bullock, Potsdam (Most outstanding player)
- Barry Stanton, Potsdam
- Johnny Mayers, Jersey City State
- Michael Neal, LeMoyne–Owen
- Dana Janssen, Nebraska Wesleyan

== See also ==
- 1986 NCAA Division I men's basketball tournament
- 1986 NCAA Division II men's basketball tournament
- 1986 NAIA men's basketball tournament
- 1986 NCAA Division III women's basketball tournament
