= 1986 NAIA men's basketball tournament =

College basketball tournament

- Teams: 32
- Finals site: Kemper Arena; Kansas City, Missouri
- Champions: David Lipscomb (1 title, 1 title game, 1 Fab Four)
- Runner-up: Arkansas Monticello (1 title game, 1 Fab Four)
- Semifinalists: Southeastern Oklahoma (5 Final Four); St. Thomas Aquinas (1 Final Four)
- Charles Stevenson Hustle Award: Daren Reeves (Arkansas Monticello)
- Chuck Taylor MVP: John Kimbrell (David Lipscomb)

The 1986 NAIA men's basketball tournament was held in March at Kemper Arena in Kansas City, Missouri. The 49th annual NAIA basketball tournament featured 32 teams playing in a single-elimination format. David Lipscomb defeated Arkansas–Monticello 67–61 in the final to be crowned champions.

== Awards and honors ==
- Leading scorers:
- Leading rebounder:
- Player of the Year: est. 1994.

== Bracket ==
First round	Second round
1	Cumberland (KY)	74
Southern Colorado	40
1	Cumberland (KY)	46
16	Charleston (SC)	59
16	College of Charleston	57
Taylor	47
TOP TIER
9	Wayland Baptist	72
College of Idaho	66
9	Wayland Baptist	51
Arkansas–Monticello	56
Arkansas-Monticello	90**
8	Briar Cliff	86
Southwestern (TX)	80
5	Webber	79
Southwestern (TX)	53
12	Wisconsin Eau Claire	47
12	Wisconsin-Eau Claire	63
Cabrini	45
TOP TIER
13	Huron	90
Quincy	77
13	Huron	66
4	Southeastern Oklahoma State	79
4	Southeastern Oklahoma State	79'
Franklin Pierce	62
3	Birmingham Southern	76
Kearney State	64
3	Birmingham Southern	56
14	Central Washington	59
14	Central Washington	86
Findlay	82
BOTTOM TIER
11	David Lipscomb	62
Minnesota–Duluth	56
11	David Lipscomb	79
6	Emporia State	76
6	Emporia State	80
Brigham Young-Hawaii	72
7	St. Thomas Aquinas	51
Saginaw Valley State	49
7	St. Thomas Aquinas	77
Atlantic Christian	71
Atlantic Christian	92
10	Waynesburg	89
BOTTOM TIER
15	Drury	53
-	Westmont	52
15	Drury	51
2	Charleston (WV)	55
2	Charleston (WV)	78
William Carey	73

Elite Eight
16	Charleston (SC)	60
Arkansas–Monticello	63
Southwestern (TX)	55
4	Southeastern Oklahoma State	58
11	David Lipscomb	80
14	Central Washington	64
7	St. Thomas Aquinas	78
2	Charleston (WV)	77

NAIA national semifinals
Arkansas–Monticello	67
4	Southeastern Oklahoma State	61
11	David Lipscomb	102
7	St. Thomas Aquinas	91

NAIA national championship
Arkansas–Monticello	54
11	David Lipscomb	67
NAIA third-place game
4	Southeastern Oklahoma State	75
7	St. Thomas Aquinas	74

- * denotes overtime.

== See also ==
- 1986 NAIA women's basketball tournament
- 1986 NCAA Division I men's basketball tournament
- 1986 NCAA Division II men's basketball tournament
- 1986 NCAA Division III men's basketball tournament
