= John Dromo =

American basketball coach (1916–1992)

John Dromo (July 7, 1916 – September 29, 1992) was an American basketball coach. He served as the head basketball coach at the University of Louisville from 1967 to 1971.

From 1942 to 1947, Dromo served as coach of "nearly everything" at St. Xavier High School in Cincinnati, Ohio. In 1948, Dromo joined the staff at Louisville as an assistant coach for both football and basketball. For 17 years, he served under Bernard Hickman. Upon Hickman's retirement, Dromo assumed the position of head coach. During his four-year tenure, he achieved a 68–23 record. During the 1970–71 season, he suffered a heart attack and subsequently retired; he was succeeded by Denny Crum. Dromo died in 1992.
