= 1986 NCAA Division II men's basketball tournament =

- Teams: 32
- Finals site: , Springfield, Massachusetts
- Champions: Sacred Heart Pioneers (1st title)
- Runner-up: Southeast Missouri State Indians (2nd title game)
- Semifinalists: Cheyney (PA) Wolves (3rd Final Four); Florida Southern Moccasins (4th Final Four)
- Winning coach: Dave Bike (1st title)
- MOP: Roger Younger (Sacred Heart)
- Attendance: 59,370

The 1986 NCAA Division II men's basketball tournament involved 32 schools playing in a single-elimination tournament to determine the national champion of men's NCAA Division II college basketball as a culmination of the 1985–86 NCAA Division II men's basketball season. It was won by Sacred Heart University and Sacred Heart's Roger Younger was the Most Outstanding Player.

1986 NCAA Division II Men's sites - regionals (cyan) Quarterfinals (orange) Final Four (red)

== Regional participants ==
School	Outcome
Kentucky Wesleyan	Third Place
Lewis	Fourth Place
SIU Edwardsville	Runner-up
Wright State	Regional Champion

School	Outcome
Cheyney	Regional Champion
Edinboro	Fourth Place
Gannon	Runner-up
Millersville	Third Place

School	Outcome
Abilene Christian	Third Place
Delta State	Runner-up
Sam Houston	Fourth Place
SE Missouri State	Regional Champion

School	Outcome
Alaska–Anchorage	Runner-up
Cal Poly	Fourth Place
Cal State Hayward	Regional Champion
UC Riverside	Third Place

School	Outcome
Augustana (SD)	Fourth Place
Eastern Montana	Third Place
St. Cloud State	Runner-up
Wayne State (MI)	Regional Champion

School	Outcome
Alabama A&M	Fourth Place
Florida Southern	Regional Champion
Tampa	Runner-up
West Georgia	Third Place

School	Outcome
Mount St. Mary's	Runner-up
Norfolk State	Regional Champion
Virginia Union	Third Place
Winston-Salem State	Fourth Place

School	Outcome
Sacred Heart	Regional Champion
New Hampshire College	Runner-up
Springfield	Third Place
St. Anselm	Fourth Place

*denotes tie

== Regionals ==
=== Great Lakes - Fairborn, Ohio ===
Location: Physical Education Building Host: Wright State University

Regional semifinals Round of 32; March 7
SIU Edwardsville	70
Lewis	61
Wright State	94
Kentucky Wesleyan	84

Regional final Sweet 16; March 8
SIU Edwardsville	73
Wright State	77

- Third Place - Kentucky Wesleyan 91, Lewis 81

=== East - Erie, Pennsylvania ===
Location: Hammermill Center Host: Gannon University

Regional semifinals Round of 32; March 7
Cheyney	68
Edinboro	62
Gannon	78
Millersville	66

Regional final Sweet 16; March 8
Cheyney	68
Gannon	62

- Third Place - Millersville 107, Edinboro 86

=== South Central - Cape Girardeau, Missouri ===
Location: Houck Field House Host: Southeast Missouri State University

Regional semifinals Round of 32; March 7
Delta State	61
Sam Houston	59
SE Missouri State	94
Abilene Christian	72

Regional final Sweet 16; March 8
Delta State	74
SE Missouri State	75

- Third Place - Abilene Christian 73, Sam Houston 60

=== West - Hayward, California ===
Location: Pioneer Gymnasium Host: California State University, Hayward

Regional semifinals Round of 32; March 7
Alaska–Anchorage	86
UC Riverside	83
Cal State Hayward	67
Cal Poly	65

Regional final Sweet 16; March 8
Alaska–Anchorage	73
Cal State Hayward	87

- Third Place - UC Riverside 55, Cal Poly 53

=== North Central - St. Cloud, Minnesota ===
Location: Halenbeck Hall Host: St. Cloud State University

Regional semifinals Round of 32; March 7
Wayne State (MI)	72
Augustana (SD)	57
St. Cloud State	76
Eastern Montana	67

Regional final Sweet 16; March 8
Wayne State (MI)	75
St. Cloud State	71

- Third Place - Eastern Montana 86, Augustana 61

=== South - Tampa, Florida ===
Location: Spartan Sports Arena Host: University of Tampa

Regional semifinals Round of 32; March 7
Florida Southern	83
West Georgia	82
Tampa	76
Alabama A&M	69

Regional final Sweet 16; March 8
Florida Southern	67
Tampa	57

- Third Place - West Georgia 104, Alabama A&M 84

=== South Atlantic - Emmitsburg, Maryland ===
Location: Memorial Gym Host: Mount Saint Mary's College and Seminary

Regional semifinals Round of 32; March 7
Norfolk State	70
Virginia Union	60
Mount St. Mary's	74
Winston-Salem State	71

Regional final Sweet 16; March 8
Norfolk State	78
Mount St. Mary's	75

- Third Place - Virginia Union 95, Winston-Salem State 77

=== New England - Manchester, New Hampshire ===
Location: NHC Fieldhouse Host: New Hampshire College

Regional semifinals Round of 32; March 7
Sacred Heart	76**
Springfield	74
New Hampshire College	67
St. Anselm	57

Regional final Sweet 16; March 8
Sacred Heart	83
New Hampshire College	67

- Third Place - Springfield 70, St. Anselm 65

*denotes each overtime played

== National Quarterfinals ==
Quarterfinal - Norfolk, VA; Elite Eight; March 15
Norfolk State	74
Sacred Heart	84

Quarterfinal - Lakeland, FL; Elite Eight; March 14
Wayne State (MI)	65
Florida Southern	77

Quarterfinal - Dayton, OH; Elite Eight; March 15
Wright State	75
Cheyney	78

Quarterfinal - Cape Girardeau, MO; Elite Eight; March 15
SE Missouri State	85
Cal State Hayward	69

== National Finals - Springfield, Massachusetts ==
Location: Springfield Civic Center Hosts: American International College and Springfield College

National semifinals Final Four; March 21
Cheyney	81
SE Missouri State	90
Florida Southern	80
Sacred Heart	86

National championship March 22
SE Missouri State	87
Sacred Heart	93

*denotes each overtime played

== All-tournament team ==
- Riley Ellis (Southeast Missouri State)
- Keith Johnson (Sacred Heart)
- Ronny Rankin (Southeast Missouri State)
- Kevin Stevens (Sacred Heart)
- Roger Younger (Sacred Heart)

== See also ==
- 1986 NCAA Division I men's basketball tournament
- 1986 NCAA Division III men's basketball tournament
- 1986 NAIA men's basketball tournament
- 1986 NCAA Division II women's basketball tournament

== Sources ==
- 2010 NCAA Men's Basketball Championship Tournament Records and Statistics: Division II men's basketball Championship
- 1986 NCAA Division II men's basketball tournament jonfmorse.com
