= Hank Nichols =

American basketball referee (1936–2026)

- Born: July 20, 1936; Niagara Falls, New York, U.S.
- Died: March 27, 2026 (aged 89); Bryn Mawr, Pennsylvania, U.S.
- Education: Villanova University (Bachelor's Degree, 1958; Master's Degree); Duke University (Doctorate)
- Spouse: Letita Merino
- Children: 4
- Basketball career
- Position: NCAA Basketball referee
- Officiating career: 1986–2007

Henry Owen Nichols (July 20, 1936 – March 27, 2026) was an American college basketball referee and later supervisor of officials. In 2012, he was inducted as a member of the Naismith Memorial Basketball Hall of Fame. Nichols is also a member of the Philadelphia Big 5 Hall of Fame, Villanova Athletic Hall of Fame, the Philadelphia Athletic Hall of Fame, the Greater Buffalo Sports Hall of Fame, and the Pennsylvania Sports Hall of Fame. He officiated 10 National Collegiate Athletic Association (NCAA) Final Fours, a record six NCAA Men's Basketball National Championships, three NIT Finals, two Olympic Games and one European Championship. He was also the first official to work with both the NIT and NCAA Championship Basketball Finals in a single year, and the first National Coordinator of Officials. Since 2004, he has worked as an Umpire Observer for Major League Baseball.

== Early life and education ==
Nichols was born on July 20, 1936, in Niagara Falls, New York, where he grew up. In high school, he attended Bishop Duffy High and lettered in three sports. He earned a scholarship to Villanova University, where he played catcher. He also started on the freshman basketball team. In 1995 he was inducted into the Villanova Varsity Club Hall of Fame in the baseball category.

After graduation, Nichols spent two years in the Marine Corps, followed by three years playing minor league baseball in the Cincinnati Reds organization. In his last season (at age 27), he hit .330 as a player-manager in the Western Carolina League.

Nichols earned both bachelor's and master's degrees in education from Villanova, and in 1975 he received a doctorate in education administration from Duke University.

== Officiating career ==
In the fall of 1969, while at Duke, Nichols started his officiating career with six freshman Atlantic Coast Conference (ACC) basketball games. He also began officiating varsity games in the ECAC and the ACC.

In 1974, Nichols worked his first NCAA tournament, the first of 13 in a row. That season, Nichols was one of the officials for the 1974 North Carolina State-Maryland ACC championship game. Nichols said that game was the best he ever worked, and NC State's David Thompson as the greatest player he officiated. NC State won the game in overtime, and went on to win the national championship. At the time only one team from each conference made the NCAA Tournament.

"I just remember getting out of everybody's way," Nichols said. "Those players were so good. We just kind of watched them. It was a magnificent game."

In 1975, Nichols worked the first of 10 Final Fours, and the first of six national championships. The championship game was John Wooden's final game as the head coach at UCLA.

In 1976, he officiated at the Olympic Games in Montreal, the first of two Olympic assignments. His second would come in 1984 in Los Angeles.

=== NCAA National Coordinator of Officials ===
In 1987, Nichols became the first NCAA coordinator of officials. He spent 22 years in that position. Nichols said, "the goal was to try to get guys across the country to officiate the same way, not have the ACC be different from the Big Ten and the Big Ten different from the Pac-10. We wanted to teach guys to ref better, to try to get them to be more consistent. We didn't want them to be another factor when teams played on the road. We wanted them to stand tall and figure out tough situations. I think a lot of that has been accomplished." While in this position, Nichols also was the secretary/editor of the Basketball Rules Committee from 1991 to 1997.

Nichols retired after the 2007–2008 season. He was replaced by John Adams.

== Teaching career ==
Nichols taught high school English for a few years in New York State. He was later a professor in the Department of Education and Human Services at Villanova University from 1970 until his retirement from the university in 2002, eventually becoming department chair. He taught courses there such as Psychology of Learning, Methods of Teaching, and Educational Planning, and supervised the student-teacher program.

== Personal life and death ==
Nichols and his wife, Letitia Merino Nichols, had four children. He was Catholic.

Nichols died in Bryn Mawr, Pennsylvania, on March 27, 2026, at the age of 89.
