= Denny Crum =

American basketball coach (1937–2023)

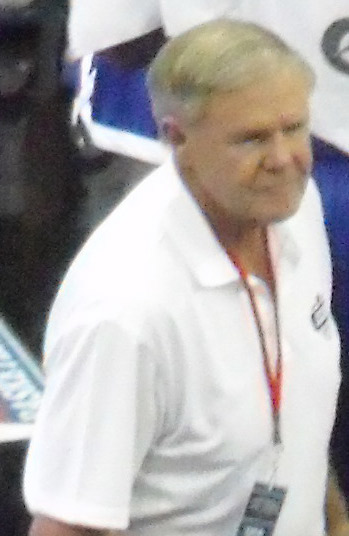
- Crum in 2011

Biographical details
- Born: March 2, 1937; San Fernando, California, U.S.
- Died: May 9, 2023 (aged 86); Louisville, Kentucky, U.S.

Playing career
- 1955–1957: Los Angeles Pierce JC
- 1957–1959: UCLA
- Position: Guard

Coaching career (HC unless noted)
- 1959–1961: UCLA (freshmen)
- 1961–1964: Los Angeles Pierce JC (assistant)
- 1964–1968: Los Angeles Pierce JC
- 1968–1971: UCLA (assistant)
- 1971–2001: Louisville

Head coaching record
- Overall: 675–295 (.696)

Accomplishments and honors

Championships
- 2× NCAA Division I (1980, 1986); 6× NCAA D-I Final Four (1972, 1975, 1980, 1982, 1983, 1986); 3× MVC regular season (1972, 1974, 1975); 12× Metro regular season (1977, 1979–1981, 1983, 1984, 1986–1988, 1990, 1993, 1994); 11× Metro tournament (1978, 1980, 1981, 1983, 1986, 1988–1990, 1993–1995)

Awards
- 2× Sporting News Coach of the Year (1983, 1986); MVC Coach of the Year (1973); 4× Metro Coach of the Year (1979, 1980, 1983, 1994); C-USA Coach of the Year (1996)
- Basketball Hall of Fame; Inducted in 1994
- College Basketball Hall of Fame; Inducted in 2006
Medal record
Head Coach for United States
World University Games
Gold medal – first place	1977 Sofia	Head coach
Pan American Games
Silver medal – second place	1987 Indianapolis	Head coach

Denzel Edwin Crum (March 2, 1937 – May 9, 2023) was an American men's college basketball coach at the University of Louisville from 1971 to 2001, compiling a 675–295 (.696) record. He guided the Cardinals to two NCAA championships (1980, 1986) and six Final Fours. Honored in the Naismith Memorial Basketball Hall of Fame since 1994, Crum was one of the major figures in the history of sports in Kentucky and in college basketball.

Crum played college ball for the UCLA Bruins under head coach John Wooden. He was later an assistant under Wooden, and the Bruins won a national championship in each of his three seasons on the staff. As the head coach at Louisville, Crum was widely credited with pioneering the now-common strategy of scheduling tough non-conference match-ups early in the season in order to prepare his teams for March's NCAA tournament, where one defeat ends the season. Crum's prolific post-season play and calm demeanor earned him the monikers "Mr. March" and his most well-known nickname, "Cool Hand Luke".

== Playing career ==
Denzel Edwin Crum was born in San Fernando, California, in Los Angeles County. After graduating from San Fernando High School in 1955, he played basketball at Los Angeles Pierce College from 1955 to 1957, averaging 27 points per game in his first season. He then transferred to the University of California, Los Angeles (UCLA), to play for the UCLA Bruins. Playing as a guard at UCLA (1957–1959), Crum averaged seven points per game. He was honored with the Irv Pohlmeyer Memorial Trophy for outstanding first-year varsity player. He also received the Bruin Bench Award for most improved player the following year. The Bruins went 38–14 in his two seasons.

== Coaching career ==
After graduating in 1959, Crum served as the freshman basketball coach at UCLA. In 1961, he returned to Pierce College as an assistant coach and served as their head coach from 1964 through 1968. Crum was then rehired by UCLA to replace assistant coach Jerry Norman, and became John Wooden's top assistant coach and chief recruiter. Crum took a $3,000 pay cut from UCLA compared to his earnings at Pierce. The Bruins won national titles in each of his three seasons while compiling an 86–4 record. His recruits included Bill Walton, one of the greatest college basketball players ever.

=== Louisville (1971–2001) ===
In 1971, Crum was hired as head coach by the University of Louisville, taking over for John Dromo, but he left UCLA thinking he would return one day to succeed Wooden. Although the Cardinals had substantial national success under former coach Bernard "Peck" Hickman, their last NCAA tournament appearance was in 1968 and Final Four in 1959; they had never won a national championship. In his first season, Crum led Louisville to the Final Four, where they lost to Wooden's UCLA team.

The Cardinals reached the Final Four again in 1975, losing once more to UCLA. Wooden retired following the tournament after winning his 10th national title. Crum declined the opportunity to replace his mentor at UCLA. Two years later, he turned down the job again after Wooden's successor, Gene Bartow, left for UAB. UCLA's salary offer was around half of what Louisville was paying him, and even less when he factored in the higher cost of living in Los Angeles. Crum said life in Louisville was "more relaxed and it's not a hassle to do everything". He led the Cardinals to four more Final Fours in the 1980s (1980, 1982, 1983, and 1986). Only five other coaches have reached more Final Fours than Crum's six: Wooden, Dean Smith, Mike Krzyzewski, Roy Williams, and Tom Izzo.

In 1979–80, national player of the year Darrell Griffith led the Cardinals to a 33–3 record. They defeated Crum's alma mater, UCLA, 59–54, to win the 1980 national championship. That squad was credited with popularizing the High-5. Six years later, Louisville defeated Duke, 72–69, for their second title, led by Pervis Ellison, who became the first freshman to be named the NCAA tournament's most outstanding player. Through his first 15 seasons, Crum won 76% of his games. He received another offer to return to UCLA in 1988, after Walt Hazzard was fired, but he remained at Louisville. In 1993, Crum became the second fastest coach to reach 500 wins.

On his 64th birthday in 2001, Crum announced that he would retire at the end of the season. Though Crum insisted the decision was his, it was widely rumored that Louisville athletic director Tom Jurich drove him out to pursue the newly available Rick Pitino. In the last 15 seasons of his career, Crum's winning percentage fell to 63%, including a 61–61 record in his final four seasons. His only three losing seasons came in his last 11 seasons, including twice in his final four seasons. Nonetheless, he led the Cardinals to four 20-win seasons and eight NCAA tournaments in the 1990s. He retired with a record of 675–295, a 69.6% winning percentage. At the time, his 675 career wins ranked 14th in NCAA history. In 30 seasons, Crum took the Cardinals to 23 NCAA tournaments, the 10th most by a coach, while compiling an overall tournament record of 42–22. The Cardinals won 20 or more games in 21 of his 30 seasons. While in the Metro Conference, they won or shared 12 regular-season titles and won 11 conference tournament championships.

During his tenure, Crum coached 13 players who were later selected in the first round of the NBA draft, including first overall pick Ellison and six others in the top 10: Junior Bridgeman, Darrell Griffith, Rodney McCray, Lancaster Gordon, Felton Spencer, and Samaki Walker.

=== Other coaching ===
Crum coached the U.S. World University team to a gold medal in 1977. He led the American's Pan American team to a silver medal in 1987.

=== Coaching style ===
Crum had a signature style as a coach. He usually held a rolled-up program in one hand during games, like Wooden, and would often gesture with it. At Louisville, whose team colors are red and black, Crum sometimes wore a red blazer on the sidelines. He stood composed, eschewing theatrics. "It's hard for players to play under control if you're not. It's hard to think or function when you're screaming", he said.

On the court, Crum's system mirrored Wooden's. Louisville was famous for running a 2-2-1 zone press that switched at half court to man-to-man defense. He ran a variation of Wooden's trademark high-post offense. Even Crum's guards tended to score on the interior: his 1980 national championship team was known as the "Doctors of Dunk." On defense, his players were expected to be interchangeable, switching on all picks, and fronted the pivot. This defense denied interior passes and encouraged perimeter shots. The year after Crum won his last national championship in 1986, the NCAA introduced the three-point line, revolutionizing the game. With outside shooting newly emphasized, Crum was slow to adjust. He never returned to the Final Four, coming as close as the Elite Eight in 1997.

Throughout his career, Crum was known for superior in-game coaching. His teams tended to score immediately out of timeouts—using plays Crum would draw up in the huddle—and play well in close games.

== Radio career ==
From 2004 to 2014, Crum co-hosted a local radio talk show with former University of Kentucky head coach Joe B. Hall. Both did their portions of the show from different studios, Crum in Louisville and Hall in Lexington. The Joe B. and Denny Show was the top Fox Sports radio show in the state of Kentucky. The show, which aired on WKRD in Louisville and WVLK-FM in Lexington, was carried by 21 stations in all at its peak, and still had 16 stations when it ended on October 30, 2014, after WVLK-FM announced a format change.

== Personal life ==
Crum was married to his third wife Susan Sweeney Crum, then a news anchor and reporter for Louisville television station WDRB, from 2001 until his death. In 2006, she became an announcer and news anchor at Louisville public radio station WFPL. Crum had three children, Cynthia and Steve from his first marriage, and Scott from his second marriage. He lived in Jeffersontown, Kentucky, and had a hunting ranch in eastern Idaho.

Crum played professional poker and collected western novels by Louis L'Amour. During his coaching career, he was amongst the founders of the Louisville Eccentric Observer, the city's alternative weekly newspaper. Crum also bred horses.

While able, Crum appeared at various functions with former Cardinal and pro-basketball player Darrell Griffith.

Crum founded The Denny Crum Scholarship Foundation, Inc., which awards scholarships to individuals who have demonstrated leadership, community service, and academic achievement. Requirements include: application form, high school transcript, 3.0 cumulative GPA, and a community service resume listing detailed volunteer involvement and leadership experience. Over 500 students have benefitted from the Foundation. It has awarded over $1.5 million in scholarships.

Crum had a stroke in 2017 and another in 2019. He died at home on May 9, 2023, aged 86. A celebration of life was held on May 15, 2023, at the KFC Yum! Center. In July 2024 it was reported that Crum's handcrafted headstone was dumped into the Red Sea after the ship conveying it from India came under attack from Houthi pirates.

== Honors ==
In the 1980s, Crum was named National Coach of the Year three times (1980, 1983, 1986). He was awarded Metro Conference Coach of the year three times (1979, 1980, 1983). In 1980, he was also named the Sporting News Coach of the Year, the Basketball Weekly Coach of the Year, and the Basketball Weekly Man of the Year.

Crum was inducted into the UCLA Athletics Hall of Fame in 1990. In 1994, he was inducted into the Naismith Memorial Basketball Hall of Fame; during the ceremony, he was accompanied to the stage by Wooden.

In 2002, Crum received the Legends of Coaching award given by the John R. Wooden Award Committee. This award recognizes "a coach's character, success rate on the court, graduating rate of student athletes, [and] his coaching philosophy".

On February 7, 2007, Louisville's home floor at Freedom Hall was officially named "Denny Crum Court." When the Cardinals basketball teams moved to the downtown KFC Yum! Center in 2010, the name "Denny Crum Court" was retained in the new facility.

In 2010 Crum was an inaugural inductee of Pierce College's athletic hall of fame.

== Head coaching record ==
Record table
Season	Team	Overall	Conference	Standing	Postseason
Louisville Cardinals (Missouri Valley Conference) (1971–1975)
1971–72	Louisville	26–5	12–2	T–1st	NCAA University Division Final Four
1972–73	Louisville	23–7	11–3	2nd	NIT Quarterfinal
1973–74	Louisville	21–7	11–1	1st	NCAA Division I Sweet 16
1974–75	Louisville	28–3	12–2	1st	NCAA Division I Final Four
Louisville Cardinals (Metro Conference) (1975–1995)
1975–76	Louisville	20–8	2–2	2nd	NIT Quarterfinal
1976–77	Louisville	21–7	6–1	1st	NCAA Division I Second Round
1977–78	Louisville	23–7	9–3	2nd	NCAA Division I Sweet 16
1978–79	Louisville	24–8	9–1	1st	NCAA Division I Sweet 16
1979–80	Louisville	33–3	12–0	1st	NCAA Division I champion
1980–81	Louisville	21–9	11–1	1st	NCAA Division I Second Round
1981–82	Louisville	23–10	8–4	2nd	NCAA Division I Final Four
1982–83	Louisville	32–4	12–0	1st	NCAA Division I Final Four
1983–84	Louisville	24–11	11–3	T–1st	NCAA Division I Sweet 16
1984–85	Louisville	19–18	6–8	T–4th	NIT Semifinal
1985–86	Louisville	32–7	10–2	1st	NCAA Division I champion
1986–87	Louisville	18–14	9–3	1st	Declined NIT
1987–88	Louisville	24–11	9–3	1st	NCAA Division I Sweet 16
1988–89	Louisville	24–9	8–4	T–2nd	NCAA Division I Sweet 16
1989–90	Louisville	27–8	12–2	1st	NCAA Division I Second Round
1990–91	Louisville	14–16	4–10	8th	
1991–92	Louisville	19–11	7–5	T–2nd	NCAA Division I Second Round
1992–93	Louisville	22–9	11–1	1st	NCAA Division I Sweet 16
1993–94	Louisville	28–6	10–2	1st	NCAA Division I Sweet 16
1994–95	Louisville	19–14	7–5	T–2nd	NCAA Division I First Round
Louisville Cardinals (Conference USA) (1995–2001)
1995–96	Louisville	22–12	10–4	T–3rd	NCAA Division I Sweet 16
1996–97	Louisville	26–9	9–5	T–5th	NCAA Division I Elite Eight
1997–98	Louisville	12–20	9–5	5th (American)	
1998–99	Louisville	19–11	11–5	2nd (American)	NCAA Division I First Round
1999–00	Louisville	19–12	10–6	2nd (American)	NCAA Division I First Round
2000–01	Louisville	12–19	8–8	5th (American)	
Louisville:		675–295	270–110		
Total:		675–295			
National champion Postseason invitational champion Conference regular season champion Conference regular season and conference tournament champion Division regular season champion Division regular season and conference tournament champion Conference tournament champion

== See also ==
- List of college men's basketball coaches with 600 wins
- List of NCAA Division I Men's Final Four appearances by coach
