= Pervis Ellison =

American basketball player (born 1967)

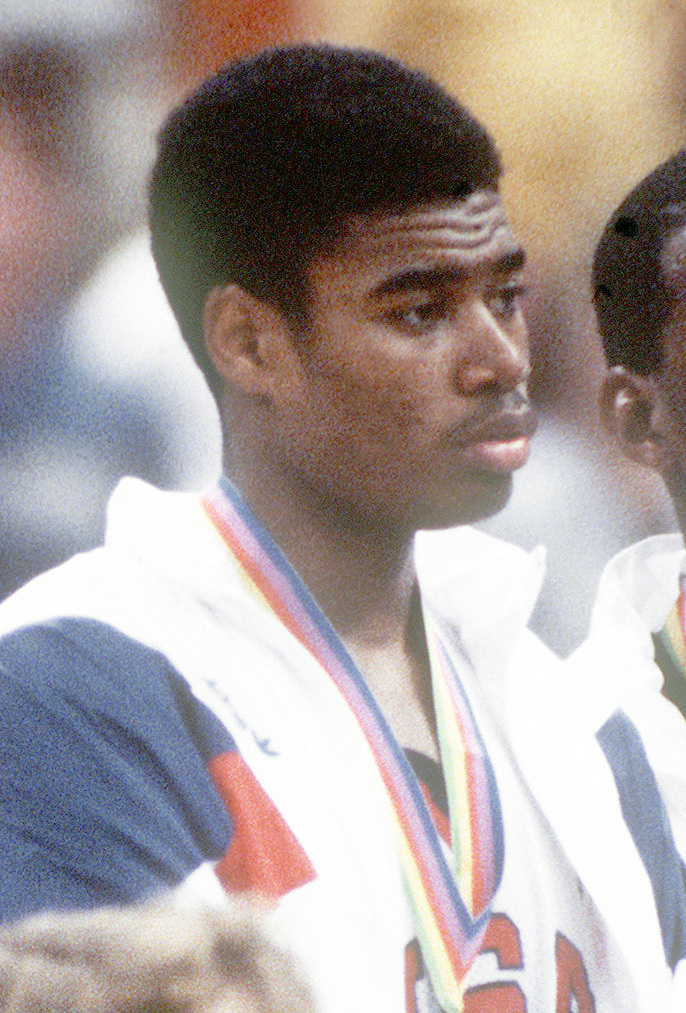
- Ellison at the 1987 Pan American Games

Personal information
- Born: April 3, 1967 (age 59) Savannah, Georgia, U.S.
- Listed height: 6 ft 9 in (2.06 m)
- Listed weight: 210 lb (95 kg)

Career information
- High school: Savannah (Savannah, Georgia)
- College: Louisville (1985–1989)
- NBA draft: 1989: 1st round, 1st overall pick
- Drafted by: Sacramento Kings
- Playing career: 1989–2000
- Position: Center
- Number: 42, 43, 29

Career history
- 1989–1990: Sacramento Kings
- 1990–1994: Washington Bullets
- 1994–2000: Boston Celtics
- 2000: Seattle SuperSonics

Career highlights
- NBA Most Improved Player (1992); NCAA champion (1986); NCAA Final Four Most Outstanding Player (1986); Consensus first-team All-American (1989); Metro Conference Co-Player of the Year (1988); 3× First-team All-Metro Conference (1987–1989); No. 42 retired by Louisville Cardinals; McDonald's All-American (1985)

Career NBA statistics
- Points: 4,494 (9.5 ppg)
- Rebounds: 3,170 (6.7 rpg)
- Assists: 691 (1.5 apg)
- Stats at NBA.com
- Stats at Basketball Reference
Medals
Men's basketball
Representing United States
Pan American Games
Silver medal – second place	1987 Indianapolis	Team competition

Pervis Ellison (born April 3, 1967) is an American former National Basketball Association (NBA) player. Nicknamed "Never Nervous Pervis" for his clutch play with the University of Louisville, after leading Louisville to a national championship, Ellison was the first overall pick in the 1989 NBA Draft. His professional career was largely hindered by injuries, though he won the NBA Most Improved Player Award in 1992.

== Collegiate career ==
At 6 ft 9 in (2.06 m), 242 lb (110 kg), he started all four years as the center under coach Denny Crum. In his freshman year he led Louisville to its second national championship, scoring a game-leading 25 points and adding 11 rebounds in the 72-69 championship win over Duke, and was then named the Most Outstanding Player—the second time a freshman had ever been awarded that honor, after Arnie Ferrin in 1944 for Utah.

== Professional career ==
Ellison was made the first overall pick in the 1989 NBA draft by the Sacramento Kings. Teammate Danny Ainge gave Ellison the nickname "Out of Service Pervis" for the many injuries that would plague him during his professional career. An injury kept him on the sidelines for 48 of 82 games of his rookie year, after which he was traded to the Washington Bullets in a three-team trade involving the Utah Jazz that also sent Jeff Malone to the Jazz and Eric Leckner, Bob Hansen, and draft picks to the Kings. On April 6, 1991, Ellison scored a career-best 30 points while adding 12 rebounds in a win over the Indiana Pacers. Although he sometimes played as a backup in 1990–1991, the following year he became a full time starter and earned Most Improved Player honors after averaging 20.0 points, 11.4 rebounds and 2.68 blocks per game. Among the best games of Ellison's NBA career occurred on January 31, 1992, when he recorded 19 points, 19 rebounds, 6 assists, 5 blocked shots and 2 steals against the Knicks.

Assorted injuries plagued his career, including two knee problems that kept him benched for 29 games in 1992–93 and 30 games in 1993–94. Ellison signed with the Boston Celtics after he was released by Washington in April 1994, but did not play until midway through the following season because he was still rehabilitating from knee problems. A broken toe suffered while moving furniture kept him out of most games between 1996 and 1998. After participating in 69 out of a possible 246 games over the final three seasons with the Celtics, he joined the Seattle SuperSonics in 2000 but retired after playing nine games. He once coached basketball for Life Center Academy in Burlington, New Jersey and is a resident of Voorhees Township, New Jersey. His son Malik played for him at Life Center Academy and is a professional basketball player.

== Career statistics ==
Legend
GP	Games played	GS	Games started	MPG	Minutes per game
FG%	Field goal percentage	3P%	3-point field goal percentage	FT%	Free throw percentage
RPG	Rebounds per game	APG	Assists per game	SPG	Steals per game
BPG	Blocks per game	PPG	Points per game	**Bold**	Career high

=== College ===
Year	Team	GP	GS	MPG	FG%	3P%	FT%	RPG	APG	SPG	BPG	PPG
1985–86	Louisville	**39**	**39**	30.6	.554	–	.682	8.2	2.0	**1.3**	2.4	13.1
1986–87	Louisville	31	31	30.7	.533	–	**.719**	**8.7**	1.8	1.2	2.6	15.2
1987–88	Louisville	35	35	**33.6**	.601	**.500**	.692	8.3	**3.1**	**1.3**	2.9	**17.6**
1988–89	Louisville	31	30	32.7	**.615**	.000	.652	**8.7**	2.5	**1.3**	**3.2**	**17.6**
Career		136	135	31.9	.577	.333	.687	8.4	2.4	1.3	2.8	15.8

=== NBA ===
==== Regular season ====
Year	Team	GP	GS	MPG	FG%	3P%	FT%	RPG	APG	SPG	BPG	PPG
1989–90	Sacramento	34	22	25.5	.442	.000	.628	5.8	1.9	.5	1.7	8.0
1990–91	Washington	**76**	30	25.6	.513	.000	.650	7.7	1.3	.6	2.1	10.4
1991–92	Washington	66	**64**	**38.0**	.539	**.333**	.782	**11.2**	**2.9**	**.9**	**2.7**	**20.0**
1992–93	Washington	49	48	34.7	.521	.000	.702	8.8	2.4	**.9**	2.2	17.4
1993–94	Washington	47	24	25.1	.469	.000	.722	5.1	1.5	.5	1.1	7.3
1994–95	Boston	55	11	19.7	.507	.000	.717	5.6	.6	.4	1.0	6.8
1995–96	Boston	69	29	20.7	.492	—	.641	6.5	.9	.6	1.4	5.3
1996–97	Boston	6	4	20.8	.375	—	.600	4.3	.7	.8	1.5	2.5
1997–98	Boston	33	8	13.5	**.571**	—	.588	3.3	.9	.6	.9	3.0
1999–2000	Boston	30	5	9.0	.442	—	.714	2.2	.4	.3	.3	1.8
2000–01	Seattle	9	0	4.4	.286	—	**1.000**	1.3	.3	.0	.2	.7
Career		474	245	24.5	.520	.050	.689	6.7	1.5	.6	1.6	9.5

==== Playoffs ====
Year	Team	GP	GS	MPG	FG%	3P%	FT%	RPG	APG	SPG	BPG	PPG
1995	Boston	4	0	17.0	.579	—	1.000	4.3	.5	.5	1.3	6.0

== See also ==
- List of NCAA Division I men's basketball players with 2000 points and 1000 rebounds
