= 1983 McDonald's All-American Boys Game =

American high school basketball game

West	East
115	113
	1st half	2nd half	Total
West	62	53	115
East	73	40	113
- Date: April 9, 1983
- Venue: Omni Coliseum, Atlanta, GA
- MVP: Winston Bennett and Dwayne Washington
- Referees: 1; 2; 3
- Attendance: 14,926

McDonald's All-American

The 1983 McDonald's All-American Boys Game was an All-star basketball game played on Saturday, April 9, 1983 at the Omni Coliseum in Atlanta, Georgia. The game's rosters featured the best and most highly recruited high school boys graduating in 1983. The game was the 6th annual version of the McDonald's All-American Game first played in 1978.

== 1983 game ==
The East team could count on the two top guards from the state of New York: Kenny Smith and Dwayne "Pearl" Washington, and also had several of the top 10 players of the class. The West had top-ranked forward Winston Bennett and center Joe Wolf. The East dominated the first half and at halftime led the score 73 to 62. The West came back during the second half, guided by two Kentucky commits: James Blackmon and Winston Bennett. With 4:31 remaining, the West was still 11 points behind, but an 11-0 run tied the score. The decisive layup was scored by Blackmon with 9 seconds remaining on the clock: Dwayne Washington scored a layup with 1 second left, but the officials called a charge and the basket did not count. The West won the game 115 to 113: Washington (11 points and 8 assists) was named MVP together with Bennett, who scored 21 points. Other players who had good performances were Tom Sheehey (the top scorer of the game with 22 points), Blackmon (21 points), Bruce Dalrymple (16) and Michael Smith (15). Of the 25 players, 12 went on to play at least 1 game in the NBA.

=== East roster ===
No.	Name	Height	Weight	Position	Hometown	High school	College of Choice
–	Tommy Amaker	6-2	–	G	Fairfax, VA, U.S.	W. T. Woodson	Duke
–	Mark Cline	6-7	–	F	Williamson, WV, U.S.	Williamson	Wake Forest
–	Dallas Comegys	6-9	–	F	Philadelphia, PA, U.S.	Roman Catholic	DePaul
–	Tom Curry	6-9	–	C	Baton Rouge, LA, U.S.	Redemptorist	LSU
–	Bruce Dalrymple	6-4	–	F / G	St. Johnsbury, VT, U.S.	St. Johnsbury Academy	Georgia Tech
–	Frank Ford	6-4	–	G	Kissimmee, FL, U.S.	Osceola	Auburn
–	Keith Gatlin	6-5	–	G	Greenville, NC, U.S.	D. H. Conley	Maryland
–	Melvin Howard	6-1	–	G	Decatur, GA, U.S.	Decatur	Georgia
–	Dave Popson	6-9	–	C	Kingston, PA, U.S.	Bishop O'Reilly	North Carolina
–	Tom Sheehey	6-8	–	F	Rochester, NY, U.S.	McQuaid Jesuit	Virginia
–	Kenny Smith	6-2	–	G	Jamaica, NY, U.S.	Archbishop Molloy	North Carolina
–	Dwayne Washington	6-2	–	G	Brooklyn, NY, U.S.	Boys and Girls	Syracuse
–	Reggie Williams	6-7	–	F	Baltimore, MD, U.S.	Paul Laurence Dunbar	Georgetown

=== West roster ===
No.	Name	Height	Weight	Position	Hometown	High school	College of Choice
–	Freddie Banks	6-2	–	G	Las Vegas, NV, U.S.	Valley	UNLV
–	Winston Bennett	6-7	–	F	Louisville, KY, U.S.	Male	Kentucky
–	James Blackmon	6-3	–	G	Marion, IN, U.S.	Marion	Kentucky
–	Corey Gaines	6-3	–	G	Playa del Rey, CA, U.S.	Saint Bernard	UCLA
–	Antoine Joubert	6-5	–	G	Detroit, MI, U.S.	Southwestern	Michigan
–	Martin Nessley	7-2	–	C	Whitehall, OH, U.S.	Whitehall-Yearling	Duke
–	Kevin Smith	6-7	–	F	Lansing, MI, U.S.	Everett	Minnesota
–	Michael Smith	6-9	–	C	Hacienda Heights, CA, U.S.	Los Altos	BYU
–	Barry Sumpter	6-11	–	C	Lovejoy, IL, U.S.	Lovejoy	Louisville
–	Daryl Thomas	6-7	–	F	Westchester, IL, U.S.	St. Joseph	Indiana
–	Rickie Winslow	6-8	–	F	Houston, TX, U.S.	Yates	Houston
–	Joe Wolf	6-10	–	C	Kohler, WI, U.S.	Kohler	North Carolina

=== Coaches ===
The East team was coached by:

- Head Coach Buddy Gardler of Cardinal O'Hara High School (Philadelphia, Pennsylvania)

The West team was coached by:

- Head Coach Joe Treat of Bryant High School (Bryant, Arkansas)
