= Theo Pinson =

American basketball player (born 1995)

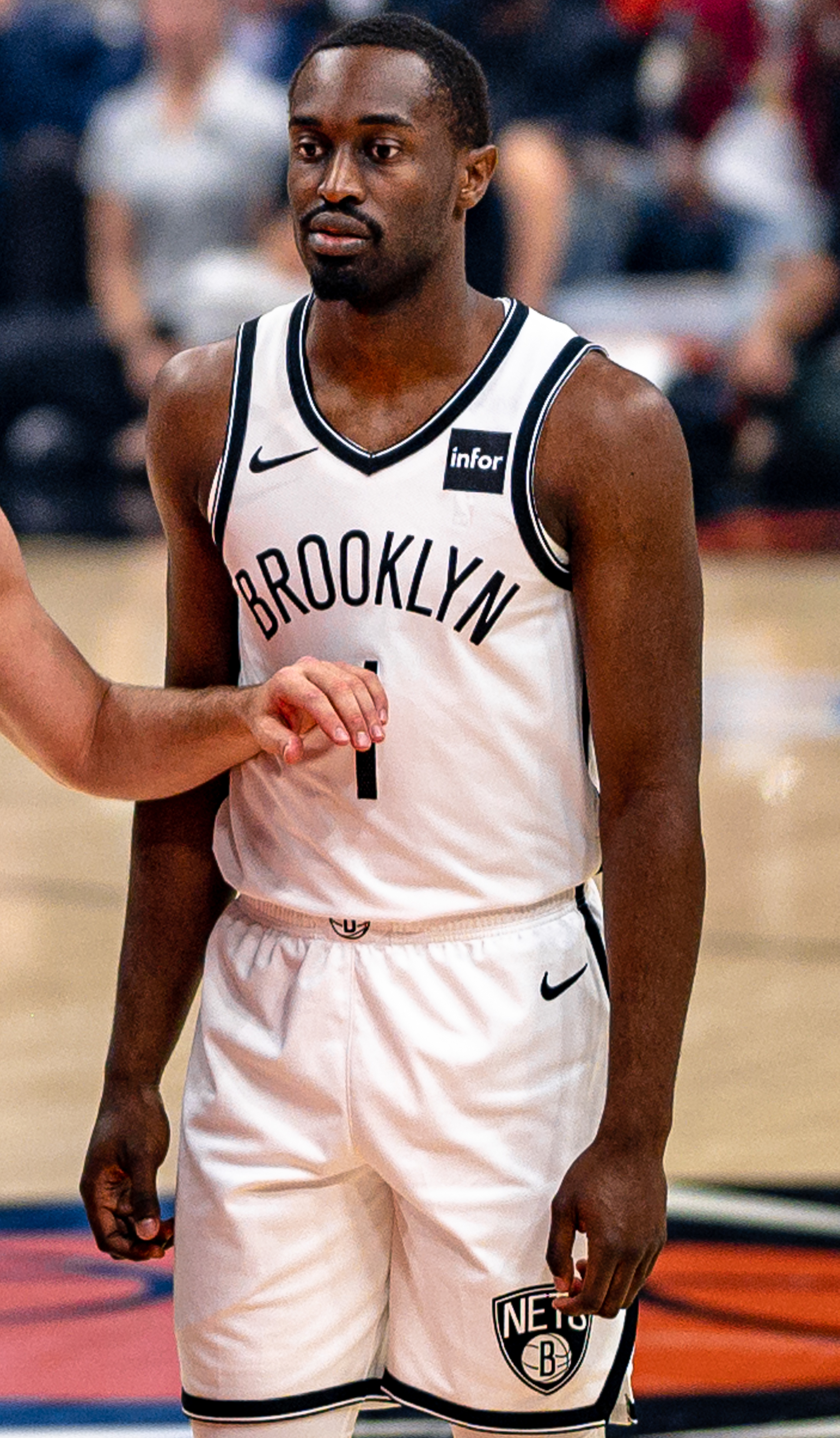
- Pinson with the Brooklyn Nets in 2019

Personal information
- Born: November 5, 1995 (age 31) Greensboro, North Carolina, U.S.
- Listed height: 6 ft 6 in (1.98 m)
- Listed weight: 212 lb (96 kg)

Career information
- High school: Oak Ridge (Oak Ridge, North Carolina); Wesleyan Christian Academy (High Point, North Carolina)
- College: North Carolina (2014–2018)
- NBA draft: 2018: undrafted
- Playing career: 2018–2026
- Position: Shooting guard / small forward
- Number: 10, 1, 21

Career history
- 2018–2020: Brooklyn Nets
- 2018–2020: →Long Island Nets
- 2020–2021: New York Knicks
- 2021: Maine Celtics
- 2021–2023: Dallas Mavericks
- 2022: →Texas Legends
- 2023–2024: Texas Legends
- 2025–2026: Mets de Guaynabo

Career highlights
- All-NBA G League Second Team (2019); NBA G League All-Rookie Team (2019); NCAA champion (2017); McDonald's All-American (2014); North Carolina Mr. Basketball (2014)
- Stats at NBA.com
- Stats at Basketball Reference
Medals
Representing the United States
FIBA Americas U16 Championship
Gold medal – first place	2011 Mexico	Team

Theophilus Alphonso Pinson Jr. (born November 5, 1995) is an American former professional basketball player. He played college basketball for the North Carolina Tar Heels. A 6 ft 7 in (2.01 m) swingman, Pinson was the starting shooting guard for the Tar Heels' 2017 NCAA championship team.

== High school career ==
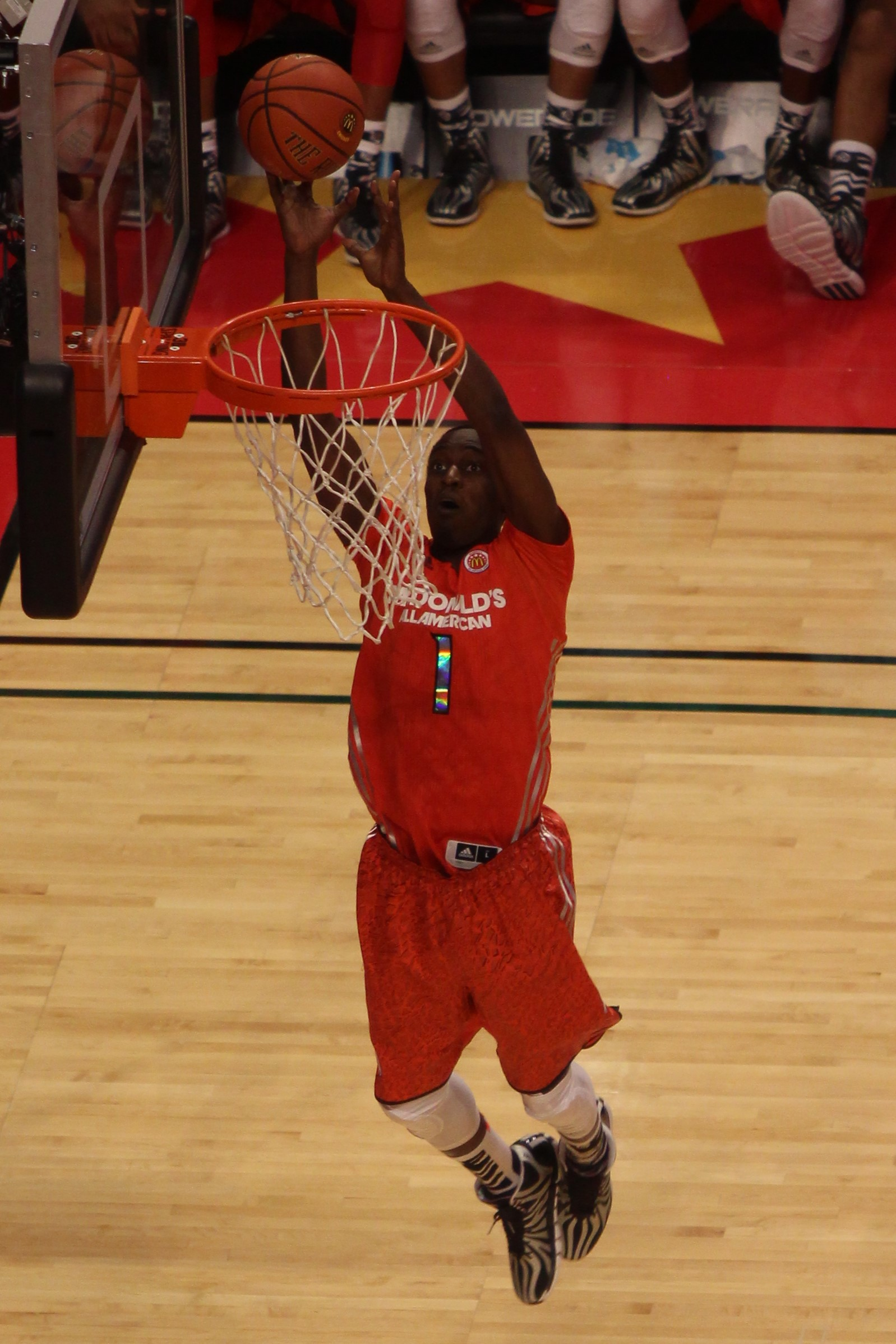
Pinson in the 2014 McDonald's All-American Game

Born and raised in Greensboro, North Carolina, Pinson first attended Oak Ridge Military Academy as a freshman, before transferring to Wesleyan Christian Academy in nearby High Point, where he was coached by Keith Gatlin and teammates with future and fellow NBA player Harry Giles III. He was named a McDonald's All-American in his senior year. In the summer of 2011, Pinson was named to the USA Basketball U16 team, where he won the gold medal with future Tar Heel teammate Justin Jackson.

== College career ==
Pinson's college career was marked by injury early, as he broke the fifth metatarsal bone in his left foot and missed 14 games of his freshman season. His sophomore season was injury free; however, he broke the same bone (fifth metatarsal) in his right foot, causing him to miss the first 16 games of his junior season. While on the court, Pinson's passing, defense and leadership played a key role in the Tar Heels' run to consecutive National Championship Title Games. Pinson was also acknowledged as a positive factor in the locker room for these teams, as he developed a reputation as a prankster in both the locker room and with the media. During the Tar Heels' 2017 championship run, Pinson's playmaking helped the team defeat Kentucky in the South Regional Final, as his full-court drive and pass set up a game-winning shot by forward Luke Maye. As a senior, he averaged 10.3 points, 6.5 rebounds and 5.1 assists in 29.7 minutes per game.

== Professional career ==
=== Brooklyn Nets (2018–2020) ===
After going undrafted in the 2018 NBA draft, Pinson joined the Brooklyn Nets for the 2018 NBA Summer League. He posted 11.2 points, 4.0 rebounds, and 2.2 assists per game in five summer league games. On August 6, 2018, Pinson signed a training camp contract with the Nets, which was confirmed to be a two-way contract for the 2018–19 season. Under the terms of the deal, he will split time between the Nets and their NBA G League affiliate, the Long Island Nets. Pinson made his NBA debut on October 20, in a 132–112 loss to the Indiana Pacers, scoring two points with a rebound and two assists in six and half minutes of play. On April 10, 2019, the Nets converted Pinson's two-way deal to a full NBA contract. Pinson made 18 total appearances for the Nets during his rookie campaign, averaging 4.5 points, 2.0 rebounds, and 1.2 assists. On April 15, Pinson made his postseason debut against the Philadelphia 76ers, scoring nine points shooting 3–for–5 from the field and 3–for–4 from the three–point line. On July 8, the Nets re-signed Pinson to a reported two-year contract, after the Nets rescinded their qualifying offer to Pinson on July 6.

In December 2019, Pinson began to see more minutes for the Nets due to an Achilles injury to David Nwaba. On February 4, 2020, Pinson scored 32 points to go with nine rebounds, three assists and two steals in the G League as the Long Island Nets defeated the Wisconsin Herd 117–110. Pinson played in 33 games for Brooklyn during the 2019–20 season, recording averages of 3.6 points, 1.6 rebounds, and 1.7 assists. On June 23, Pinson was waived by the Nets. During his two-year tenure with the Nets, Pinson was known for his dance celebrations on the team's bench.

=== New York Knicks (2020–2021) ===
Three days later after leaving the Brooklyn Nets, on June 26, 2020, Pinson was claimed off waivers by the New York Knicks.

On November 19, 2020, the Knicks announced that they did not exercise the team option on Pinson, making him a free agent. On November 29, the Knicks re-signed Pinson to a two-way contract with the Westchester Knicks. He made 17 appearances for New York in the 2020–21 NBA season, averaging 0.1 points, 0.3 rebounds, and 0.1 assists.

=== Maine Celtics (2021) ===
Pinson joined the Milwaukee Bucks for the 2021 NBA Summer League.

On September 28, 2021, Pinson signed with the Boston Celtics, but was waived at the end of training camp. On October 23, he signed with the Maine Celtics as an affiliate player. Pinson averaged 16.4 points, 4.4 assists, 4.6 rebounds, and 1.3 steals per game.

=== Dallas Mavericks and Texas Legends (2021–2024) ===
On December 20, 2021, Pinson signed a 10-day contract with the Dallas Mavericks. He signed a second 10-day contract with the Mavericks on December 31. Pinson signed a two-way contract with Dallas on January 10, 2022. He made 19 total appearances for the Mavericks during the 2021–22 NBA season, averaging 2.5 points, 1.1 rebounds, and 0.9 assists.

On July 1, 2022, Pinson re-signed with the Mavericks on a one-year deal. In the last game of the 2022–23 season, Pinson recorded his first career triple-double in a 117–138 loss to the San Antonio Spurs. He made 40 total appearances (including one start) for Dallas during the regular season, logging averages of 2.4 points, 1.6 rebounds, and 1.2 assists.

On October 29, 2023, Pinson re-joined the Texas Legends.

On January 19, 2025, Pinson announced his retirement from professional basketball to focus on his family and broadcasting career.

=== Mets de Guaynabo (2025) ===
On May 23, 2025, Pinson returned to his basketball career and signed with Mets de Guaynabo of the Baloncesto Superior Nacional (BSN).

== Career statistics ==
Legend
GP	Games played	GS	Games started	MPG	Minutes per game
FG%	Field goal percentage	3P%	3-point field goal percentage	FT%	Free throw percentage
RPG	Rebounds per game	APG	Assists per game	SPG	Steals per game
BPG	Blocks per game	PPG	Points per game	**Bold**	Career high

=== NBA ===
==== Regular season ====
Year	Team	GP	GS	MPG	FG%	3P%	FT%	RPG	APG	SPG	BPG	PPG
2018–19	Brooklyn	18	0	**11.7**	.342	.261	.864	**2.0**	1.2	.3	.0	**4.5**
2019–20	Brooklyn	33	0	11.1	.290	.188	.938	1.6	**1.7**	**.5**	.1	3.6
2020–21	New York	17	0	2.0	.111	.000	.000	.3	.1	.0	.0	.1
2021–22	Dallas	19	0	7.8	**.359**	.333	**1.000**	1.1	.9	.3	.1	2.5
2022–23	Dallas	**40**	**1**	8.1	.356	**.355**	.846	1.6	1.2	.2	.0	2.4
Career		127	1	8.5	.320	.261	.902	1.4	1.1	.3	.1	2.7

==== Playoffs ====
Year	Team	GP	GS	MPG	FG%	3P%	FT%	RPG	APG	SPG	BPG	PPG
2019	Brooklyn	3	0	7.3	.375	.429	—	1.0	1.0	.7	.0	3.0
Career		3	0	7.3	.375	.429	—	1.0	1.0	.7	.0	3.0

=== College ===
Year	Team	GP	GS	MPG	FG%	3P%	FT%	RPG	APG	SPG	BPG	PPG
2014–15	North Carolina	24	1	12.5	.368	.269	.611	3.0	1.5	.6	.2	2.8
2015–16	North Carolina	**40**	7	18.7	.420	**.290**	.636	3.2	2.9	.6	.3	4.8
2016–17	North Carolina	21	13	23.8	.381	.237	.702	4.6	3.7	.9	.2	6.1
2017–18	North Carolina	37	**37**	**29.7**	**.473**	.226	**.818**	**6.5**	**5.1**	**1.1**	**.5**	**10.3**
Career		122	58	21.7	.431	.257	.734	4.4	3.4	.8	.3	6.3
