= Harry Giles III =

American basketball player (born 1998)

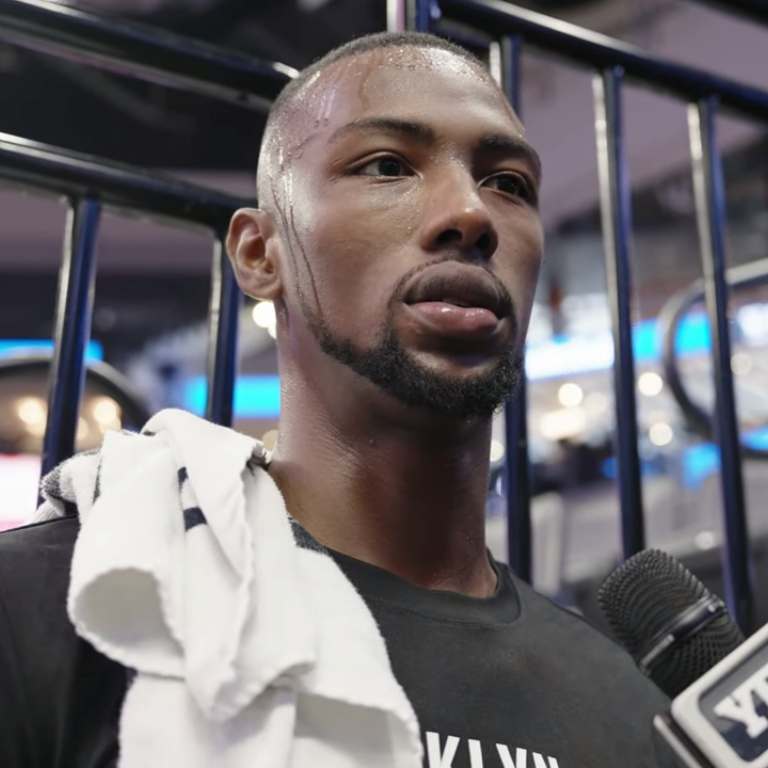
- Giles with the Brooklyn Nets in 2023

No. 1 – Beijing Royal Fighters
- Position: Power forward / center
- League: CBA

Personal information
- Born: April 22, 1998 (age 28) Winston-Salem, North Carolina, U.S.
- Listed height: 6 ft 10 in (2.08 m)
- Listed weight: 240 lb (109 kg)

Career information
- High school: Wesleyan Christian Academy (High Point, North Carolina)
- College: Duke (2016–2017)
- NBA draft: 2017: 1st round, 20th overall pick
- Drafted by: Portland Trail Blazers
- Playing career: 2017–present

Career history
- 2017–2020: Sacramento Kings
- 2018–2019: →Stockton Kings
- 2020–2021: Portland Trail Blazers
- 2021–2022: Agua Caliente Clippers
- 2023–2024: Brooklyn Nets
- 2024: Los Angeles Lakers
- 2024: →South Bay Lakers
- 2024–2025: Shanxi Loongs
- 2025–2026: Jiangsu Dragons
- 2026–present: Beijing Royal Fighters
- Stats at NBA.com
- Stats at Basketball Reference
Medals
Representing the United States
FIBA World U19 Cup
Gold medal – first place	2015 Greece	National team
FIBA World U17 Championship
Gold medal – first place	2014 Dubai	National team
FIBA Americas U16 Championship
Gold medal – first place	2013 Uruguay	National team

Harry Lee Giles III (born April 22, 1998) is an American professional basketball player for the Beijing Royal Fighters of the Chinese Basketball Association (CBA). He played college basketball for the Duke Blue Devils, and was drafted 20th overall in the 2017 NBA draft by the Portland Trail Blazers. He has also played in the National Basketball Association (NBA) for the Sacramento Kings, Brooklyn Nets, and Los Angeles Lakers.

== High school career ==
=== Freshman and sophomore seasons ===
Giles attended Wesleyan Christian Academy in High Point, North Carolina, where he was coached by Keith Gatlin. As a freshman, Giles averaged 12.5 points per game and 9.5 rebounds per game after leading Wesleyan Christian to a 2013 NCISAA 3A State Championship alongside future and former NBA player Theo Pinson. Giles missed his entire sophomore year due to a left knee injury. During the 2014 summer, Giles would return from injury joining Team CP3 on the EYBL circuit. He also participated in the Under Armour Elite 24 game in Brooklyn, New York, finishing with 16 points and 11 rebounds and earning Co-MVP honors.

=== Junior season ===
In his junior year, Giles and Wesleyan were ranked the No. 2 team in the Nation by USA Today. On November 14, 2014, In his second game back since his injury, Harry scored a career-high 38 points and grabbed 19 rebounds in an 82–58 win over Northside Christian Academy. On December 21, Giles scored 29 points in a 67–62 win over Mater Dei at the City of Palms Classic in Fort Myers, Fla., ending the team's 46-game win streak. Giles and the Trojans then played in the 2014–15 High School OT Holiday Invitational Tournament at Needham B. Broughton High School in Raleigh, North Carolina. On December 29, Giles and Wesleyan defeated Word of God Christian Academy (98–85) behind Giles 31 points and 17 rebounds to advance to the championship game. On December 30, 2014, Giles went head to head against an Orangeville Prep team that featured future NBA players Jamal Murray and Thon Maker. Wesleyan would go on to defeat Orangeville Prep (78–75) with Giles scoring 26 points and 14 rebounds while Maker scored 24 points and 11 between the two. On January 15, 2015, Giles scored 17 points, 12 rebounds, and 4 assist to help the Trojans defeat Malik Monk and Bentonville High School (63–55). On the season, Giles averaged 23.9 points per game, 12.5 rebounds per game, 2.0 assist per game, and 3.0 blocks per game while leading the Wesleyan Trojans to a (30–5) record and a NCISAA 3A state championship game appearance, losing to in-state rival Greensboro Day School.

At the end of his junior season, Giles earned first-team All-USA honors by USA Today. During the summer of 2015, Giles would rejoin his AAU Team, Team CP3 All-Stars, sponsored by fellow Winston-Salem native and former NBA superstar Chris Paul. Giles averaged 18.2 points per game and 12.0 rebounds per game in 16 games on the Nike Elite Youth Basketball League circuit, earning first-team All-EYBL honors. In August 2015, Slam magazine would name Giles to its Summer All-American Team.

=== Senior season ===
Before his senior season, Giles decided to attend and play for the high school basketball powerhouse Oak Hill Academy in Mouth of Wilson, Virginia. Giles dominated the majority of his high school career; however, his senior year ended with a torn ACL in his right knee. The injury occurred during his first scrimmage game with Oak Hill. Weeks later, Giles enrolled to (now-defunct) Forest Trail Academy in Kernersville, North Carolina to take online courses to finish his senior year of high school while rehabbing from his knee injury. On November 6, 2015, Giles made his verbal commitment to attend Duke University and play for the Duke Blue Devils live on ESPN joining fellow five-star 2016 recruits Jayson Tatum, Frank Jackson, and later Marques Bolden. Giles chose Duke over other offers from Kentucky, Kansas, North Carolina and Wake Forest. He was selected to play in the 2016 Jordan Brand Classic and Nike Hoop Summit but was unable due to injury.

Giles was rated as a five-star recruit and considered the best high school prospect of the 2016 class. Giles ranked as the No.1 overall recruit and No.1 power forward in the 2016 high school class by ESPN, while Scout.com and Rivals ranked him No. 2 in the Class of 2016 only behind Josh Jackson.

College recruiting
Name	Hometown	School	Height	Weight	Commit date
Harry Giles III; PF/C	Winston-Salem, NC	Oak Hill Academy (VA)	6 ft 10 in (2.08 m)	230 lb (100 kg)	Nov 6, 2015
Harry Giles III; PF/C	Recruit ratings: Scout: Rivals: 247Sports: ESPN: (97)				
Overall recruit ranking: Scout: 2 Rivals: 2 ESPN: 1
Note: In many cases, Scout, Rivals, 247Sports, On3, and ESPN may conflict in their listings of height and weight.; In these cases, the average was taken. ESPN grades are on a 100-point scale.; Sources: "2016 Duke Basketball Commitment List". Rivals.; "2016 Duke Blue Devils Recruiting Class". ESPN.; "2016 Team Ranking". Rivals.com.

== College career ==
Before the start of the 2016–17 season, Giles was selected to both Naismith and John R. Wooden Award preseason watchlists, while also finishing third in voting for ACC Preseason Rookie of the Year. On October 3, 2016, it was announced Giles would likely miss up to six weeks to have surgery on his knee. On December 7, 2016, it was announced that Giles could make his long-awaited Duke debut.

On December 19, 2016, Giles made his college debut in a win against Tennessee State. On January 4, 2017, he recorded his first double-double with 10 points and 12 rebounds in a win over Georgia Tech. On March 10, 2017, in the ACC tournament semi-finals against rival North Carolina, Giles had 4 blocks, 7 rebounds, and 6 points in a (95–83) win. On March 11, 2017, Giles contributed to 4 points and 4 rebounds in a 75–69 victory over Notre Dame in the ACC Tournament Championship game. As a #2 seed in the NCAA Tournament, Duke defeated Troy University in the first round, but would go on to lose in the second round against South Carolina. On the season, Giles appeared in 26 games and only averaged 3.9 points, 3.8 rebounds per game.

At the conclusion of his freshman season, Giles announced that he would forgo his final three years of collegiate eligibility at Duke and enter the 2017 NBA draft.

== Professional career ==
=== Sacramento Kings (2017–2020) ===
On June 22, 2017, Giles was selected by the Portland Trail Blazers with the 20th overall pick in the 2017 NBA draft. His rights were later traded to the Sacramento Kings on draft night. Giles would sit out the entire 2017 NBA Summer League. On July 8, 2017, Giles signed his rookie contract with the Kings worth $10.6 million over 4 years. On October 6, 2017, it was announced Giles would make his NBA debut in January 2018. On January 18, 2018, it was announced that Giles would sit out the rest of the season.

On May 14, 2018, The Sacramento Bee announced that Giles would participate in the California Classic Summer League on July 2, 3, and 5 in Sacramento. Giles joined the Kings for the 2018 NBA Summer League. In his NBA debut on October 17, 2018, Giles scored 2 points in a 123–117 season-opening loss against the Utah Jazz. On November 10, 2018, Giles was assigned to the Stockton Kings, the G League affiliate of the Kings, where he scored 30 points in his debut for the team. On November 11, 2018, Giles was recalled by the Kings. On January 31, 2019, Giles recorded a career-high 20 points and 7 rebounds in a 135–113 victory over the Atlanta Hawks. On April 3, the Kings shut down Giles for the remainder of the season.

On October 31, 2019, the Kings declined Giles's option for the 2020–21 season worth $4 million. Giles scored a season-high 19 points in Sacramento's 112–108 loss to the Oklahoma City Thunder on February 27, 2020.

=== Portland Trail Blazers (2020–2021) ===
On November 22, 2020, Giles signed with the Portland Trail Blazers. On April 4, 2021, he scored 12 points and 2 rebounds in a 133–85 win over the Oklahoma City Thunder.

=== Agua Caliente Clippers (2021–2022) ===
On September 27, 2021, Giles signed with the Los Angeles Clippers. However, he was waived on October 16. On October 27, Giles signed with the Agua Caliente Clippers as an affiliate player. On January 23, 2022, he was waived by Agua Caliente after suffering a season-ending knee injury.

=== Brooklyn Nets (2023–2024) ===
On August 8, 2023, the Golden State Warriors held a free agent workout with Giles. On September 6, he signed with the Brooklyn Nets, but was waived on February 8, 2024.

=== Los Angeles / South Bay Lakers (2024) ===
On March 2, 2024, Giles signed a two-way contract with the Los Angeles Lakers.

On September 28, 2024, Giles signed with the Charlotte Hornets, but was later waived on October 18.

=== Shanxi Loongs (2024–2025) ===
On November 13, 2024, Giles signed with the Shanxi Loongs of the Chinese Basketball Association.

=== Jiangsu Dragons (2025–2026) ===
On October 9, 2025, Giles signed with the Jiangsu Dragons of the Chinese Basketball Association.

=== Beijing Royal Fighters (2026–present) ===
On July 27, 2026, Giles signed with the Beijing Royal Fighters of the Chinese Basketball Association.

== National team career ==
Giles competed for Team USA at the 2015 FIBA Under-19 World Cup in Greece. During the tournament, he finished third in points per 40 minutes, with an average of 26.4, second in offensive rebounding percentage, at 17.1%, and first in defensive rebounding percentage, at 28.7%. He was named to the All-Tournament Team.

== Career statistics ==
Legend
GP	Games played	GS	Games started	MPG	Minutes per game
FG%	Field goal percentage	3P%	3-point field goal percentage	FT%	Free throw percentage
RPG	Rebounds per game	APG	Assists per game	SPG	Steals per game
BPG	Blocks per game	PPG	Points per game	**Bold**	Career high

=== NBA ===
==== Regular season ====
Year	Team	GP	GS	MPG	FG%	3P%	FT%	RPG	APG	SPG	BPG	PPG
2018–19	Sacramento	**58**	0	14.1	.503	.000	.637	3.8	**1.5**	**.5**	**.4**	**7.0**
2019–20	Sacramento	46	**17**	**14.5**	**.554**	.000	**.776**	**4.1**	1.3	**.5**	**.4**	6.9
2020–21	Portland	38	0	9.2	.433	**.348**	.593	3.5	.8	.2	.3	2.8
2023–24	Brooklyn	16	0	5.1	.500	.273	.538	1.6	.4	.1	.2	3.4
2023–24	L.A. Lakers	7	0	2.7	.167	.000	—	.6	.0	.1	.0	.3
Career		165	17	11.7	.508	.244	.661	3.5	1.1	.4	.3	5.4

==== Playoffs ====
Year	Team	GP	GS	MPG	FG%	3P%	FT%	RPG	APG	SPG	BPG	PPG
2021	Portland	1	0	4.0	.000	—	—	3.0	.0	.0	.0	.0

=== College ===
Year	Team	GP	GS	MPG	FG%	3P%	FT%	RPG	APG	SPG	BPG	PPG
2016–17	Duke	26	6	11.5	.577	.000	.500	3.9	.4	.4	.7	3.9

== Personal life ==
Giles is the son of Harry and Melissa Giles. He has one brother and three sisters. Giles's father Harry Giles II played both college basketball and football at Winston-Salem State University. Giles is good friends with former Duke teammate and current NBA player Jayson Tatum.
