= Matt Angle =

American baseball player (born 1985)

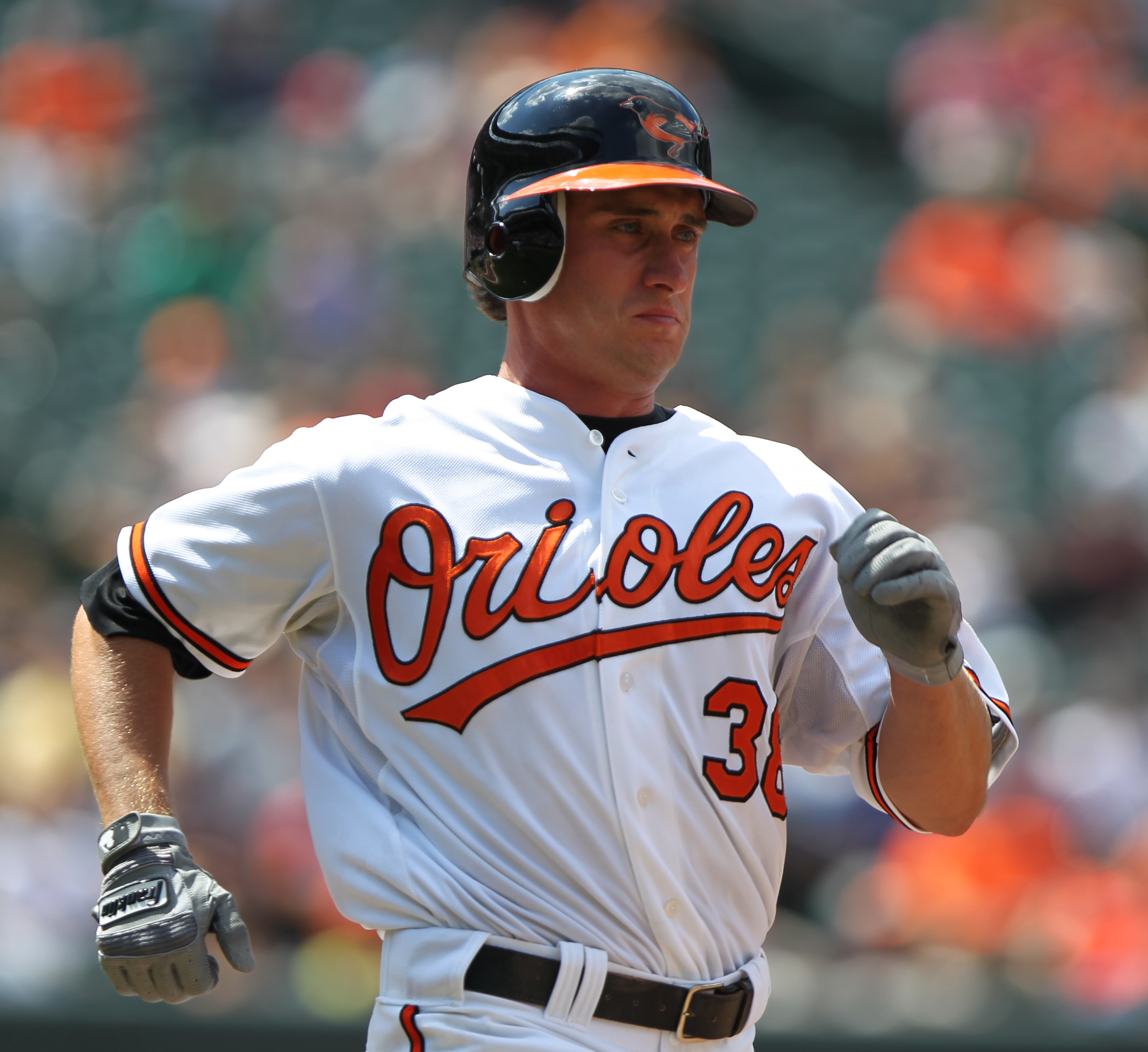
- Angle with the Baltimore Orioles
- Outfielder
- Born: September 10, 1985 (age 39); Columbus, Ohio, U.S.
- Batted: Left Threw: Right

MLB debut
- July 17, 2011, for the Baltimore Orioles

Last appearance
- September 28, 2011, for the Baltimore Orioles

MLB statistics
- Batting average: .177
- Home runs: 1
- Runs batted in: 7
- Stats at Baseball Reference

Teams
- Baltimore Orioles (2011)

Matthew Ryan Angle (born September 10, 1985) is an American former professional baseball outfielder. He played college baseball at Ohio State University from 2005 to 2007 for coach Bob Todd before playing professionally from 2007 to 2015, playing in Major League Baseball (MLB) for the Baltimore Orioles in 2011.

== Amateur career ==
Prior to playing professionally, Angle attended Whitehall-Yearling High School in Whitehall, Ohio and then Ohio State University. In his first year with Ohio State, 2005, he hit .307 with 13 stolen bases. The following year, he hit .369 with 25 stolen bases, and in 2007 - his final year with the team - he hit .366 with 22 stolen bases. After the 2006 season, he played collegiate summer baseball with the Cotuit Kettleers of the Cape Cod Baseball League.

== Professional career ==
=== Baltimore Orioles ===
Angle was drafted by the Baltimore Orioles in the seventh round, with the 219th overall selection, of the 2007 Major League Baseball draft, beginning his professional career that season.

Angle played for the Low-A Aberdeen IronBirds in 2007, posting a .301 batting average with 14 RBI and 34 stolen bases in 61 games. In 2008, he hit .287 with four home runs, 35 RBI, and 37 stolen bases for the Single-A Delmarva Shorebirds. The next season, Angle played for the High-A Frederick Keys (123 games) and Double-A Bowie Baysox (eight games), hitting a combined .293 with one home run, 33 RBI, and 42 stolen bases. With the BaySox and Triple-A Norfolk Tides in 2010, Angle hit .278 with two home runs, 33 RBI, and 29 stolen bases.

Angle made his major league debut on July 17, 2011. In 31 games during his rookie campaign, he slashed .177/.294/.266 with one home run, seven RBI, and eleven stolen bases. On February 10, 2012, Angle was designated for assignment by the Orioles.

=== Los Angeles Dodgers ===
On February 23, 2012, the Los Angeles Dodgers claimed Angels off waivers from the Orioles. He spent the entire 2012 season with the Triple-A Albuquerque Isotopes, appearing in 115 games and hit .303 with five home runs, 47 RBI, and 13 stolen bases. On October 11, the Dodgers removed Angle from the 40-man roster and sent him outright to the Isotopes.

In 2013, Angle played in 120 games and hit .283 for the Isotopes, while hitting eight home runs, driving in 62 RBI, and stealing 22 bases. He elected free agency following the season on November 4, 2013.

=== Miami Marlins ===
On December 3, 2013, Angle signed a minor league contract with the Miami Marlins. He played in 88 games for the Triple-A New Orleans Zephyrs, hitting .213/.280/.264 with one home run, 16 RBI, and four stolen bases. Angle was released by the Marlins organization on August 2, 2014.

=== Oakland Athletics ===
On January 21, 2015, Angle signed a minor league contract with the Oakland Athletics. In 53 games split between the Double-A Midland RockHounds and Triple-A Nashville Sounds, he hit a combined .238/.364/.293 with no home runs, 10 RBI, and 15 stolen bases. Angle was released by the A's organization on July 18.

== Coaching career ==
In 2018, Angle was named an assistant baseball coach at Ohio State University.

On January 30, 2025, the Cleveland Guardians hired Angle to serve as the hitting coach for their Triple-A affiliate, the Columbus Clippers.
