= Samaki Walker =

American basketball player (born 1976)

- Walker at the White House in 2002

Personal information
- Born: February 25, 1976 (age 50) Columbus, Ohio, U.S.
- Listed height: 6 ft 9 in (2.06 m)
- Listed weight: 260 lb (118 kg)

Career information
- High school: Eastmoor (Columbus, Ohio); Whitehall-Yearling (Whitehall, Ohio)
- College: Louisville (1994–1996)
- NBA draft: 1996: 1st round, 9th overall pick
- Drafted by: Dallas Mavericks
- Playing career: 1996–2011
- Position: Power forward / center
- Number: 52, 55, 5

Career history
- 1996–1999: Dallas Mavericks
- 1999–2001: San Antonio Spurs
- 2001–2003: Los Angeles Lakers
- 2003–2004: Miami Heat
- 2004–2005: Washington Wizards
- 2005–2006: Indiana Pacers
- 2006: UNICS Kazan
- 2007: Santa Barbara Breakers
- 2007–2008: Al-Jalaa Aleppo
- 2008–2009: Club Sagesse
- 2009: Shandong Lions
- 2009–2010: Seoul SK Knights
- 2010–2011: Al-Jalaa Aleppo

Career highlights
- NBA champion (2002); 2x Syrian League champion (2008, 2011); Third-team Parade All-American (1994)

Career NBA statistics
- Points: 2,376 (5.3 ppg)
- Rebounds: 2,089 (4.7 rpg)
- Blocks: 316 (0.7 bpg)
- Stats at NBA.com
- Stats at Basketball Reference

Samaki Ijuma Walker (born February 25, 1976) is a former American professional basketball power forward and center. Walker played college basketball for the Louisville Cardinals and was selected in the 1996 NBA draft by the Dallas Mavericks, where he played until 1999. Walker continued to play for the NBA with the San Antonio Spurs (1999–2001), Los Angeles Lakers (2001–2003), Miami Heat (2003–2004), Washington Wizards (2004–2005), and Indiana Pacers (2005–2006). Afterwards, Walker played in various international and minor leagues.

== Early life ==
Walker was born in Columbus, Ohio, the youngest of seven children. He attended Eastmoor High School and Whitehall-Yearling High School.

== Basketball career ==
=== Early years ===
Denny Crum recruited Walker to attend the University of Louisville, where he enjoyed two successful seasons playing for the Cardinals. He recorded the first triple double in school history, with 14 points, 10 boards and 11 blocks in a win over their rival the Kentucky Wildcats. His 11 blocks and the team's 17 blocks in the game were both school records as well. in 1995, while playing in a pickup game at the UofL rec center, he dunked on Mike Diggins, a student from Marquette University. Walker decided to forgo his final two years of eligibility and enter the 1996 NBA draft. Selected ninth overall by the Dallas Mavericks, Walker drew widespread attention on draft day for wearing an all-white suit with a matching fedora.

A 6' 9" power forward, Walker became the youngest Maverick to appear in a game. That season, new coach Don Nelson began drastically changing the makeup of the team, and Walker was actually the longest-tenured Maverick while still a rookie. He posted career highs in points and rebounds with 8.9 points and 7.4 rebounds a game during the 1997–98 season for the Mavericks.

In the summer of 1999, Walker signed a two-year contract with the defending champion San Antonio Spurs. He opted for a smaller deal to play in San Antonio rather than re-sign with Dallas, as he wanted to play under the tutelage of David Robinson and Tim Duncan. He played two years with the team as a reserve.

=== Los Angeles Lakers ===
In the summer of 2001, Walker signed as a free agent with the two-time defending champion Los Angeles Lakers, who needed a power forward following the departure of veteran Horace Grant. Walker started in 63 of 69 games, averaging 6.7 points per game and 7.0 rebounds for the season, and stepped in at center for superstar Shaquille O'Neal when injured. He recorded a season high 18 points to go with 10 rebounds in a Christmas Day win against the Philadelphia 76ers. On February 19, 2002, Walker entered the injured list because of a hyperextended elbow.

Walker would only start in 5 of the Lakers 19 playoff games, with Robert Horry entrenching himself as the starter with his clutch play. In Game 4 of the 2002 Western Conference Finals on May 26, 2002, Walker made a 3-pointer at the end of the first half; by then the Sacramento Kings led the Lakers 65–51. Although the shot counted, television replays showed Walker had released the ball after the buzzer went off. The Lakers won the game 100–99 on a buzzer-beating 3-pointer from Horry that tied the series at 2. The Lakers then won the series in 7 to advance to the Finals. Walker's shot influenced the NBA's decision to institute instant replay for review the following season.

The Lakers reached the NBA Finals, defeating the New Jersey Nets in a four-game sweep to win their third straight championship and give Walker his first and only championship ring. Shaq has credited Walker for his contributions to the Lakers championship run, namely his play against Chris Webber of the Kings during the Western Conference Finals series. He would be the last Laker to wear #52 before it was retired in honor of Jamaal Wilkes.

The following year, Walker was now the primary backup behind O'Neal and Horry, but still started in 39 of 67 games. The Lakers three–year reign as champions ended with a loss to the Spurs in the conference semifinals. He became a free agent after the season, and the Lakers opted to sign Karl Malone and draft Brian Cook, effectively ending his run in Los Angeles.

=== Later years and international play ===
Walker signed as a free agent with the Miami Heat in 2003. The following season, he signed with the Washington Wizards. He dealt with numerous injuries both years and only played 47 games over the two seasons.

Walker spent a brief seven–game stint with the Indiana Pacers during the 2005–06 season and a portion of the 2007 offseason with the Milwaukee Bucks, but was unable to latch on with either team.

In January 2006, Walker played in four games with the Russian Professional Basketball League team UNICS Kazan, averaging 7.0 points and 4.3 rebounds per game.

In 2007, Walker joined Syria's Al-Jalaa Aleppo. With Al-Jalaa, Walker won the Syrian D-1 championship in 2008.

In 2009, Walker signed with Chinese league's Shandong Lions. Walker later played with the Korean Basketball League's Seoul SK Knights.

In January 2010, Walker was released from Korean Basketball League's Seoul SK Knights after averaging 14.1 points and 8.9 rebounds. In October 2010 he signed again with Al-Jalaa Aleppo. He won a second Syrian League Championship with the team that season, and retired shortly after.

== Personal life ==
In Swahili, "Samaki" means "fish" . Walker has three children, sons Dibaji and Jabari, and daughter Sakima. After his 17-year-old nephew Deandre Hillman died from cardiac arrest in 2001, Walker joined the non-profit organization Start-A-Heart, which provides automated external defibrillators to schools and other public facilities. He spent the 2006–07 season forming Life Choices Foundation, a nonprofit aiming to keep youth in inner-city Los Angeles out of trouble.
