= Whitehall City School District =

School district in Ohio, United States

- District headquarters

Address
- 625 South Yearling Road Whitehall, Ohio, 43213; United States

District information
- Type: Public
- Grades: PK–12
- Established: 1956; 70 years ago
- Superintendent: Sharee Wells
- Schools: 6
- NCES District ID: 3904507

Students and staff
- Students: 3,472 (2024–2025)
- Teachers: 200.96 (on an FTE basis) (2024–2025)
- Staff: 994.71 (on an FTE basis) (2024–2025)
- Student–teacher ratio: 17.28 (2024–2025)
- Athletic conference: Central Buckeye League
- District mascot: Ram
- Colors: Black and white

Other information
- Website: wcsrams.org

Whitehall City Schools (WCS) is a public school district in Franklin County, Ohio, United States, serving the entire city of Whitehall, Ohio.

== Schools ==
- Whitehall-Yearling High School
- Rosemore Middle School
- Beechwood Elementary School
- Etna Road Elementary School
- Kae Avenue Elementary School
- C. Ray Williams Early Childhood Center

=== Former schools ===
- East Broad Street Elementary School
- East Main Street School
- Robinwood Elementary School

== History ==
In 1954, the Whitehall-Yearling High School began construction and admitting students. That same year, Ray Schick became Supervisor of Athletics and Physical Education. Schick was close friends with Sid Gillman, coach of the Los Angeles Rams, who were the inspiration for the Rams as the Whitehall mascot. Gillman even gave specifications on how to recreate the team's helmets.

The Whitehall City Schools District was established in 1956 after Whitehall's incorporation as a city. Upon establishment, there were 4 schools in Whitehall: Cedarhurst Elementary School (which became East Broad Street Elementary School), Courtright School, White Hall School (which became East Main Street School), and Whitehall-Yearling High School, which was still under construction. By 1968, 4 new elementary schools and a junior high were built.

In 1968, Whitehall City Schools became one of the 5 districts to join the Joint Vocational School District of Eastland Vocational School (now Eastland-Fairfield Career & Technical Schools).

In 2004, the Whitehall Education Foundation was established as a non-profit, funding schools and supporting staff and students with grants and scholarships.
