= Domenik Hixon =

American football player (born 1984)

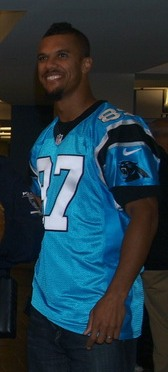
- Hixon represents the Carolina Panthers at the Do the Right Thing 2013 Awards

No. 12, 87
- Position: Wide receiver

Personal information
- Born: October 8, 1984 (age 42); Neunkirchen, West Germany
- Listed height: 6 ft 2 in (1.88 m)
- Listed weight: 205 lb (93 kg)

Career information
- High school: Whitehall-Yearling (Whitehall, Ohio, U.S.)
- College: Akron (2003–2005)
- NFL draft: 2006: 4th round, 130th overall pick

Career history
- Denver Broncos (2006–2007); New York Giants (2007–2012); Carolina Panthers (2013); Chicago Bears (2014)*
- * Offseason or practice squad member only

Awards and highlights
- 2× Super Bowl champion (XLII, XLVI); Second-team All-MAC (2005)

Career NFL statistics
- Receptions: 109
- Receiving yards: 1,460
- Return yards: 2,563
- Total touchdowns: 9
- Stats at Pro Football Reference

Domenik Hixon (born October 8, 1984) is an American former professional football player who was a wide receiver and return specialist in the National Football League (NFL). He was selected by the Denver Broncos in the fourth round of the 2006 NFL draft. He played college football for the Akron Zips. He was also a member of the New York Giants, with whom he became a two-time Super Bowl winner against the New England Patriots twice, as well as a member of the Carolina Panthers and Chicago Bears.

== Early life ==
Hixon was born to an African American father and a German mother. He attended Whitehall-Yearling High School in Whitehall, Ohio and was a letterman in football, basketball, track, and baseball. In basketball, he was named Honorable Mention All-State as a point guard. In track, he cleared 6–5 in the high jump event.

Hixon was a high school teammate of NFL defensive back Keiwan Ratliff.

== College career ==
Hixon was one of Charlie Frye's passing weapons during his first 3 years at Akron. In the 2005 MAC Championship game, Luke Getsy found Hixon for what would be the game-winning, 36-yard touchdown pass with 11 seconds remaining in the fourth quarter, earning Akron its first MAC Championship in school history.

== Professional career ==
=== Denver Broncos ===
Hixon played four games for the Denver Broncos to start the 2007 season, but was released in early October. He functioned as the team's starting kick returner. At the start of the second quarter in the first game of the season against the Buffalo Bills, tight end Kevin Everett suffered a serious spinal cord injury while tackling Hixon. Everett had a near-full recovery after a grim prognosis but never played another NFL game.

=== New York Giants ===
The New York Giants immediately signed Hixon, who spent most of the season on special teams; he had one reception for five yards against the Minnesota Vikings on November 25, 2007. In the Giants' regular season finale against the undefeated New England Patriots, he took over the main kickoff returning duties in place of the injured Ahmad Bradshaw and underperforming Reuben Droughns, and made his mark by returning a kickoff 74 yards for a touchdown. Hixon's score put the Giants ahead 14–10 in the 2nd quarter, but the Giants lost 38–35.

As the main kickoff returner, Hixon returned 10 kickoffs for an average of 25.3 yards during the Giants' run to Super Bowl XLII. His returns provided the Giants with good field position and helped propel their offense into the end zone on several occasions. He recovered a critical fumble late in the 4th quarter of the NFC Championship game on January 20 at frigid Lambeau Field, a game the Giants eventually won in overtime. Hixon also recorded 2 special teams tackles in the 2008 playoffs.

Hixon later broke out in the Giants second preseason game of 2008 against the Cleveland Browns, catching two touchdown passes and then returned an 82-yard kickoff for a touchdown, all in the 1st quarter.

In Week 5 that year, Hixon was forced to start after Giants wide receiver Plaxico Burress was suspended for breaking team rules. Hixon would have 4 catches for 102 yards and a touchdown in his first career start. He left the game late in the first half after suffering a concussion. In Week 14, Hixon would be placed in the starting role for the rest of the season, due to the suspension of Burress for conduct detrimental to the team after suffering an accidental self-inflicted gunshot wound to his leg; he ended up leading the team in receiving yards with 596 on 43 receptions, while also becoming the team's main punt returner.

The loss of veterans Burress and Amani Toomer led to Hixon starting the first two games of the 2009 season, but a sprained knee led to him getting surpassed on the depth chart by Mario Manningham and rookie Hakeem Nicks to go with fellow starter Steve Smith. Now handling both kickoff and punt return duties, Hixon earned NFC Special Teams Player of the Week honors in Week 13 after a critical 79-yard punt return for a touchdown in the 4th quarter against the Dallas Cowboys; on the year, he averaged 15.1 yards on 17 punt returns.

On June 16, 2010, Hixon suffered a torn ACL at the Giants' first practice in their new home at New Meadowlands Stadium, and was pronounced out for the season. He was waived/injured and subsequently placed on the injured reserve list on July 17.

On March 3, 2011, Hixon re-signed with the New York Giants. On August 13, Hixon returned from injury for the Giants' preseason matchup against the Carolina Panthers. In Week 2 of the 2011 season, Hixon tore his ACL while making a spectacular bobbling catch in the endzone against the St. Louis Rams. He was declared out for the season.

Hixon re-signed again with the Giants on March 2, 2012. Starting in place of an injured Hakeem Nicks alongside Victor Cruz, he had a career-high 114 receiving yards on September 30 against the Philadelphia Eagles.

=== Carolina Panthers ===
At the start of free agency, Hixon reportedly turned down an offer from the Detroit Lions. After receiving interest from the Cleveland Browns and Carolina Panthers, Hixon ultimately agreed to terms on a one-year deal with the Panthers on April 3, 2013. In a Week 16 game against the New Orleans Saints, Hixon caught a game-winning, 14-yard touchdown pass from Cam Newton to give the Panthers a 17–13 win and give them first place in the NFC South.

=== Chicago Bears ===
On March 13, 2014, Hixon signed a one-year contract with the Chicago Bears. On May 27, during Organized Team Activities (OTAs), he suffered a torn ACL for the third time in his career. On the same day that his injury during the Bears' OTAs was announced, Hixon announced through his Facebook page that he would be retiring from the NFL. On June 3, the Bears terminated Hixon's contract with an injury settlement.

In his career, Hixon made 31 special teams tackles, caught 109 passes for 1,460 yards (13.4 avg) and 7 touchdowns, ran 3 times for 18 yards, returned 56 punts for 597 yards and a touchdown and 80 kickoffs for 1,966 yards and a touchdown.

== Charity work ==
Hixon hosts the Next Level Football Camp, with co-founder Anthony Jordan, which provides underprivileged children in the Columbus, Ohio area with a summer football training program. In the past, the camp has been staffed by current and former NFL players such as Lance Moore, Chase Blackburn, and Gary Joshua.
