= Montay Brandon =

American basketball player

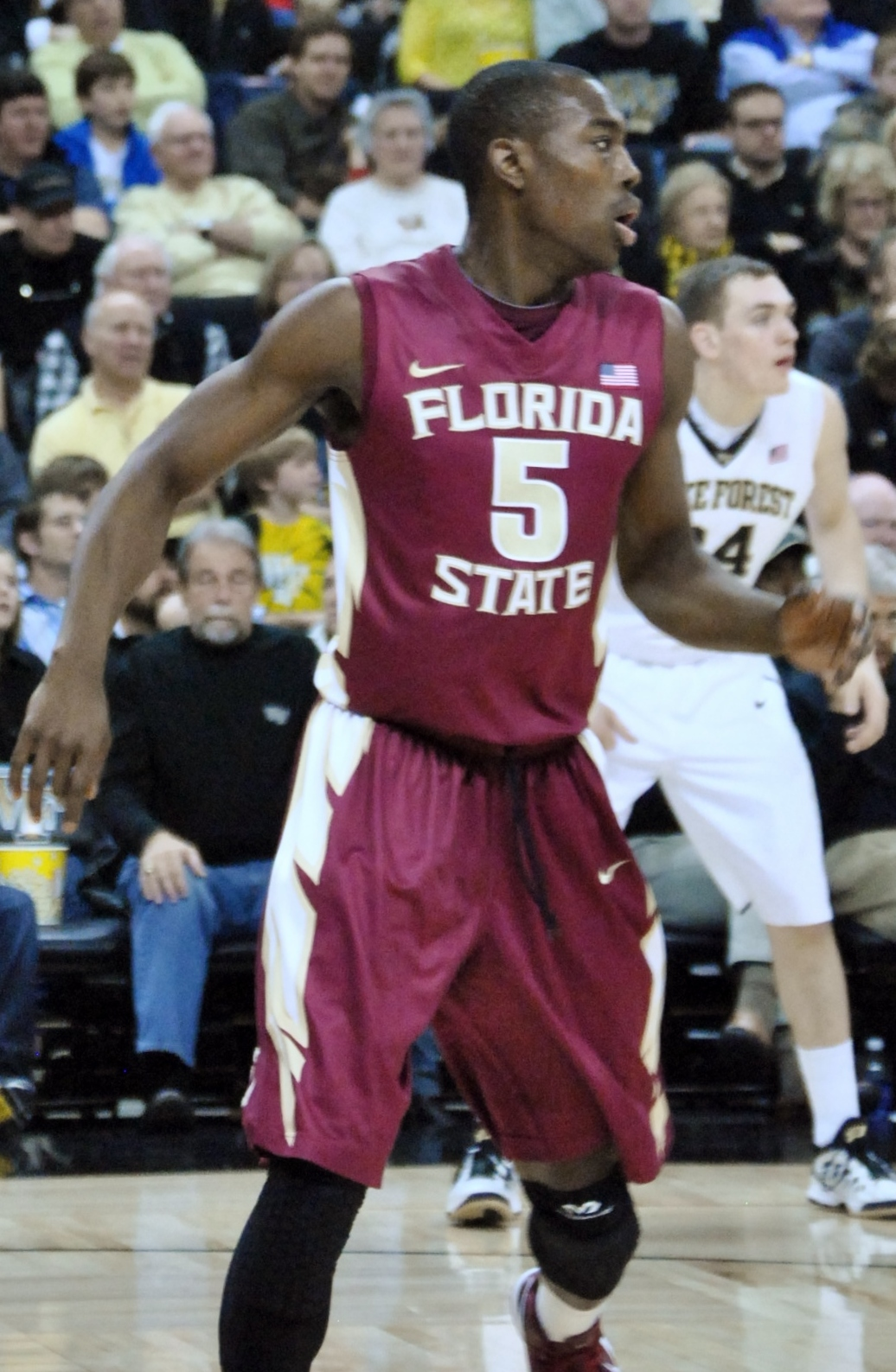
- Brandon playing for Florida State in 2013

Stetson Hatters
- Position: Assistant coach
- League: Atlantic Sun Conference

Personal information
- Born: September 3, 1993 (age 33) Greensboro, North Carolina, U.S.
- Listed height: 6 ft 8 in (2.03 m)
- Listed weight: 225 lb (102 kg)

Career information
- High school: Wesleyan Christian Academy (High Point, North Carolina)
- College: Florida State (2012–2016)
- NBA draft: 2016: undrafted
- Playing career: 2016–2021
- Coaching career: 2021–present

Career history

Playing
- 2016–2017: BBC Résidence
- 2017–2018: Kagawa Five Arrows
- 2018–2019: CLS Knights
- 2019–2021: St. John's Edge

Coaching
- 2021-2022: Charlotte (GA)
- 2022-2023: UMES (assistant)
- 2023-present: Stetson (assistant)

Montay Brandon (born September 3, 1993) is an American basketball coach and former player who is currently an assistant coach at Stetson University.

== Playing career ==
=== College ===
Brandon played college basketball at Florida State, where he averaged 11.7 points per game as a junior. As a senior, he missed some time with a groin injury.

=== Professional ===
During the 2019–20 season, Brandon averaged 11.7 points, 11.6 rebounds, and 1.6 assists per game for the St. John's Edge. He was named to the Third Team All-NBL Canada.

== Coaching career ==
In November 2022, following a season as a graduate assistant at Charlotte, Brandon was named an assistant coach at the University of Maryland Eastern Shore.

Brandon was hired as an assistant coach at Stetson University in 2023.
