= Monica Day =

American broadcaster and beauty queen

- Born: Monica Day Hillegass; July 5, 1982 (age 44); Palm Beach, Florida U.S.
- Height: 5 ft 8 in (1.73 m)
- Beauty pageant titleholder
- Title: Miss Ohio USA 2008
- Hair color: Brown
- Eye color: Brown
- Major competition: Miss USA 2008 (Miss Congeniality)

Monica Day (born Monica Day Hillegass; July 5, 1982) is a Columbus, Ohio broadcaster who competed in the Miss USA pageant in 2008.

== Early life ==
Day was born in Palm Beach, Florida to Jim Hillegass and Linda Sapp. Day is a 2000 graduate of Whitehall-Yearling High School in Whitehall, Ohio where she was raised by her mother and her stepfather Charles Boggs. Day's grandfather is Bill Sapp, a central Ohio restaurateur who, with his partner Lee Henry, established The Top steakhouse, The Kahiki and The Wine Cellar restaurant in the 1950s and 1960s.

== Pageant experience ==
She was successful after previously placing as a semi-finalist in the pageant in 2003, 2004 and 2006 and making the Top 5 at Miss Ohio Teen USA 2000 (under the name Monica Day-Boggs).

Day won the Miss Ohio USA title in late 2007, she went on to represent Ohio in the Miss USA 2008 pageant held in Las Vegas, Nevada on April 11, 2008. Although she did not place in the national pageant, she did win the Miss Congeniality award, the first for her state.

== Broadcast career ==
Day appears on WCMH 4, an NBC affiliate based in Columbus Ohio where she is an anchor for the morning news broadcast.

Preceded by Anna Melomud	Miss Ohio USA; 2008	Succeeded by Natasha Vivoda
