= Wesleyan Christian Academy =

Private, Tk-12th grade Christian school in North Carolina

Location
- 1917 North Centennial Street; High Point, North Carolina 27262; United States; 35°59′16″N 80°00′07″W

Information
- Type: Private; Independent; college- preparatory; Christian school
- Motto: To Know and Live the Truth
- Religious affiliation: Christianity
- Denomination: Wesleyan
- Established: 1971 (55 years ago)
- Founder: Clyde A. Parker
- CEEB code: 342018
- Head of school: Dr. David Ray
- Faculty: 75.6
- Grades: K–12
- Gender: Co-Educational
- Enrollment: 975 (2019–2020)
- Student to teacher ratio: 19:1
- Hours in school day: 7 hours 15 minutes
- Campus size: Centennial Campus (25 acres); Sandy Ridge Campus (71 acres)
- Campus type: Suburban
- Colors: Red and Gold
- Athletics: North Carolina Independent Schools Athletic Association (NCISAA)
- Sports: 37 athletic teams
- Nickname: Trojans
- Rival: High Point Christian Academy, Greensboro Day School
- Accreditation: Cognia; ACSI; Council for Educational Standards and Accountability Council on Educational Standards and Accountability
- School fees: New student applicants: $100; New student enrollment: $475; Continuous enrollment: $220; Graduation (grade 12): $150
- Tuition: $12,000–$22,500 including the enrichment center (2025–26)
- Affiliation: Wesleyan Church, a ministry of The North Carolina Wesleyan Church
- Website: www.wcatrojans.org

Wesleyan Christian Academy is a K–12 private, college preparatory, Christian school located in High Point, North Carolina, United States. It is accredited by Cognia and the Association of Christian Schools International.

== History ==
In 1971, Wesleyan was founded by Clyde A. Parker of the First Wesleyan Church of High Point. During the summer of 1981, Kernersville Wesleyan Academy would merge with the Wesleyan Education Center and was created into what is now Wesleyan Christian Academy. Wesleyan had its first graduating class in 1982.

== Athletics ==
The Wesleyan Christian Academy Trojans play in numerous varsity sports. The school competes in the 4A division of the North Carolina Independent Schools Athletic Association (NCISAA). The Trojans' primary rival is Greensboro Day School, an independent school located in nearby Greensboro, NC . Wesleyan's secondary rival is High Point Christian Academy, an independent school also located in High Point. Wesleyan's athletic director is John Hughes.

Wesleyan won the 1991–92 Wachovia Cup for Class 1A, awarded annually to high schools with the best interscholastic sports programs based on overall performance across sports programs throughout the year.

The men's soccer team won consecutive NCISAA titles in the 1990s, winning the NCISAA Class 1A state title in 1988, 1990, 1991 (2–1 vs. Fayetteville Academy) and 1992 (1–0 vs O'Neal School). The team returned to success with another state championship in 2005, followed by state titles in (2011, 2012, 2014, 2015, 2017, 2018).

The boys basketball team has won the NCISAA championship six times: in 1985, 1986, 1989, 1993, 2013, and 2014. In 2018, it was announced former coach Keith Gatlin would join High Point University's basketball team as an assistant coach under Tubby Smith. Notable players to come out of the Wesleyan program include, Theo Pinson, Montay Brandon, Harry Giles, Brandon Childress, Aaron Wiggins and Jaylen Hoard.

The Trojans added lacrosse as an official sport for the 2008 spring season. The Trojans had a club team in 2007, and is currently led under coach Joe Young. In 2010, Colin Kennedy became the new head coach; he attends High Point University as a junior.

In 2008, the men's baseball team rolled to the NCISAA state championship with a 23–2 record. In 2010, the baseball team again won the NCISAA 3A State championship by beating Forsyth Country Day in the best-of-three finals in a two-game sweep. In 2018, Wesleyan defeated Charlotte Christian in the NCISAA 3A Finals, claiming their 5th NCISAA 3A State championship. The baseball team has won 5 NCISAA 3A State championship's (2008, 2010, 2016, 2017, 2018).

Wesleyan was the 2010 NCISAA state champion in both Girls Swimming and Men's Wrestling.

== Fine arts ==
Wesleyan has one of the finest Fine Arts departments in NC. It won the Harris Teeter jingle award in 2009 and 2010. In 2008, a private Teaching Studio, under the direction of Michael Jarrett, was established to provide private instruction in instrumental and vocal music. The Studio now employs twenty-two part-time professional teachers and provides two hundred private lessons per week (school and community). The Studio is one of the largest in the Triad. Wesleyan now has 4th– 8th-grade choruses and three high school choruses. Each of the choruses goes to one or more accreditations. The Wesleyan Fine Arts has band programs for 6th– 8th-grade students and a high school band. There is also a Praise Band. Wesleyan Christian Academy hosts a High School musical annually. There is also an elementary musical, in which the fourth graders have the leading roles.

== Future growth ==
In 2010 Wesleyan bought 66 acres (27 ha) of land in Colfax. It is located at the corner of Johnson St and Sandy Ridge Rd. The school plans to develop the land over the next few years, moving the school to the new land. They will do it in stages, including sports fields, grounds, classes, and student life.

== PPP funds ==
Wesleyan Education Center received $1,811,734 in PPP funds during the 2020 COVID-19 pandemic.

== Notable alumni ==
- Patrick Bailey (class of 2017) – MLB catcher
- Montay Brandon (class of 2012) – professional basketball player
- Brandt Bronico (class of 2013) – MLS midfielder
- Elizabeth Carty – competitor in the Miss Teen USA pageant
- Brandon Childress (class of 2016) – professional basketball player
- Jacob Cozart (class of 2021) – professional baseball player
- Sam Cozart (class of 2025) – college baseball player
- Drew Fulk – music producer and songwriter
- Harry Giles III (class of 2016; transferred after junior year) – NBA player
- Jaylen Hoard (class of 2018) – French-American basketball player for Hapoel Tel Aviv of the Israeli Basketball Premier League
- Brett Kerry (class of 2018) – MLB pitcher
- Wil Myers (class of 2009) – MLB player, 2016 All-Star selection with the San Diego Padres
- Theo Pinson (class of 2014) – NBA player, 2017 NCAA champion with North Carolina
- Aaron Wiggins (class of 2018) – NBA player, 2025 NBA champion with the Oklahoma City Thunder
- Weston Wilson (class of 2013) – MLB utility player
