= Whitehall-Yearling High School =

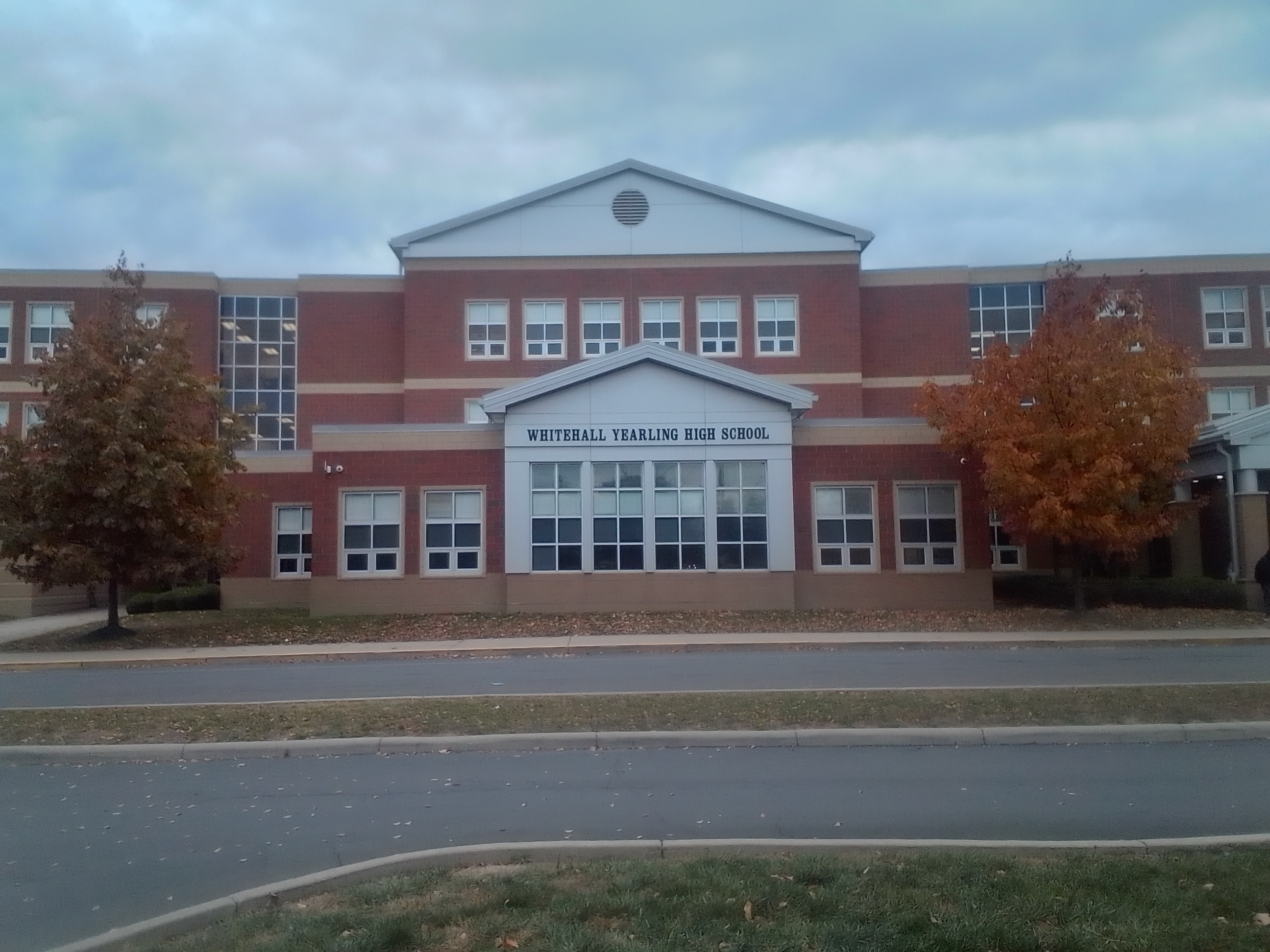

Location
- 675 South Yearling Road; Whitehall, Ohio, (Franklin County) 43213; United States; 39°57′37″N 82°53′14″W

Information
- Type: Public high school
- Opened: 1954
- School district: Whitehall City Schools
- Superintendent: Sharee Wells
- School code: 361-637
- Dean: Rod Lightfoot
- Principal: Dr. Maria A. Boyarko
- Grades: 9–12
- Colors: Black and white
- Fight song: Fight Whitehall Fight
- Athletics conference: Mid-State League
- Mascot: Ram
- Team name: Rams
- Rival: Bexley Lions
- Accreditation: North Central Association of Colleges and Schools
- Newspaper: The Rampage
- Yearbook: The Aries
- Website: wcsrams.org

Whitehall-Yearling High School is a public high school located in Whitehall, Ohio, United States.

== History ==
In 1954, Whitehall-Yearling High School admitted its first students. Work on the school was still going on while classes were in session. Classrooms were filled as they were completed. The graduating class of 1958 was the first class that was able to attend all twelve years of schooling in Whitehall.

By 1968, the Whitehall School District had built the last of its current schools. Robinwood School replaced the East Broad Street School. The Whitehall School System had five elementary schools (Beechwood, Etna Road, Kae Avenue, Robinwood, and East Main Street), one junior high school (Rosemore), and one high school (Whitehall-Yearling). Currently three of the elementary schools are in use (Beechwood, Etna Road, and Kae Avenue).

In 1966, a bond issue was established to build the Eastland Vocational Center, which actually opened in 1968. Fourteen school districts were offered the opportunity to help establish this Vocational Center. Only five districts (Canal Winchester, Gahanna, Groveport, Reynoldsburg, and Whitehall) decided to participate in the project at that time. Groveport donated forty acres for the building. In the early years of the vocational center, the acreage at the back of the center was used by the students in the Future Farmers of America (FFA) or leased out to local farmers. Today, all of the original fourteen school districts are members of what is now called Eastland-Fairfield Career & Technical Schools, along with many other districts.

Whitehall-Yearling High School was partially torn down to be rebuilt in 2013. It is now back open and school is in session.

== Ohio High School Athletic Association State Championships ==
- Girls' volleyball - 1979

== Notable alumni ==
- Matt Angle
- Monica Day
- Domenik Hixon
- Martin Nessley
- Keiwan Ratliff
- Samaki Walker

== Notable staff ==
- Scott Luster - coached women's volleyball for five seasons in the 1970s
