= Martin Nessley =

American basketball player (born 1965)

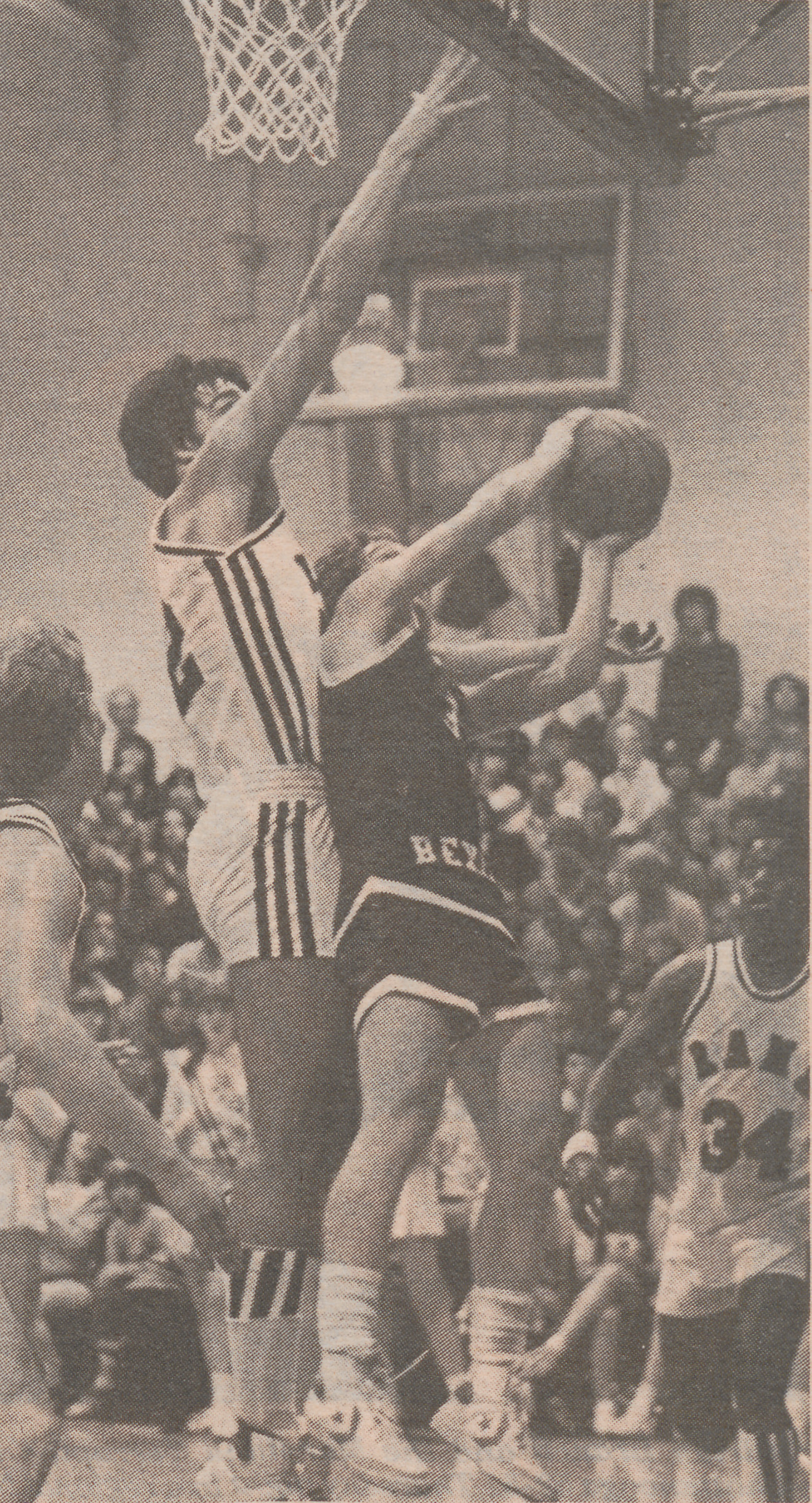
- Nessley playing for Whitehall-Yearling High School

Personal information
- Born: February 16, 1965 (age 61) Columbus, Ohio, U.S.
- Listed height: 7 ft 2 in (2.18 m)
- Listed weight: 260 lb (118 kg)

Career information
- High school: Whitehall-Yearling (Whitehall, Ohio)
- College: Duke (1983–1987)
- NBA draft: 1987: 6th round, 116th overall pick
- Drafted by: Los Angeles Clippers
- Playing career: 1987–1991
- Position: Center
- Number: 51

Career history
- 1987–1988: Los Angeles Clippers
- 1988: Sacramento Kings
- 1988–1989: Rockford Lightning
- 1989–1990: Wichita Falls Texans
- 1990–1991: Columbus Horizon

Career highlights
- Third-team Parade All-American (1983); McDonald's All-American (1983)
- Stats at NBA.com
- Stats at Basketball Reference

Martin Scott Nessley (born February 16, 1965) is an American former professional basketball player who had a brief career in the National Basketball Association (NBA) during the 1987–88 season. He was a 7'2", 260 lb center.

Nessley played college basketball for the Duke Blue Devils from 1983 to 1987 and was selected with the second pick in the sixth round of the 1987 NBA draft by the Los Angeles Clippers. He spent the following season with the Clippers and the Sacramento Kings, scoring 48 points in 44 games.

== NBA career statistics ==
Legend
GP	Games played	GS	Games started	MPG	Minutes per game
FG%	Field goal percentage	3P%	3-point field goal percentage	FT%	Free throw percentage
RPG	Rebounds per game	APG	Assists per game	SPG	Steals per game
BPG	Blocks per game	PPG	Points per game	**Bold**	Career high

=== NBA ===
==== Regular season ====
Year	Team	GP	GS	MPG	FG%	3P%	FT%	RPG	APG	SPG	BPG	PPG
1987–88	L.A. Clippers	**35**	0	**8.4**	.367	–	**.500**	**2.1**	**.5**	**.2**	**.3**	**1.2**
1987–88	Sacramento	9	0	4.6	**.667**	–	.250	1.0	.0	.1	.1	0.6
Career		44	0	7.6	.385	–	.444	1.9	.4	.2	.3	1.1
