= Keiwan Ratliff =

American football player (born 1981)

No. 25, 35, 31, 34, 20
- Position: Cornerback

Personal information
- Born: April 19, 1981 (age 45); Youngstown, Ohio, U.S.
- Listed height: 5 ft 11 in (1.80 m)
- Listed weight: 188 lb (85 kg)

Career information
- High school: Whitehall-Yearling (Whitehall, Ohio)
- College: Florida
- NFL draft: 2004: 2nd round, 49th overall pick

Career history
- Cincinnati Bengals (2004–2007); Tampa Bay Buccaneers (2007); Indianapolis Colts (2007–2008); Pittsburgh Steelers (2009); Cincinnati Bengals (2009); Florida Tuskers (2010); Cincinnati Bengals (2010); Virginia Destroyers (2011)

Awards and highlights
- UFL champion (2011); Consensus All-American (2003); SEC Defensive Player of the Year (2003); 2× First-team All-SEC (2002, 2003)

Career NFL statistics
- Total tackles: 161
- Forced fumbles: 2
- Fumble recoveries: 5
- Pass deflections: 15
- Interceptions: 5
- Defensive touchdowns: 1
- Stats at Pro Football Reference

Keiwan Jevar Ratliff (born April 19, 1981) is an American former professional football player who was a cornerback for seven seasons in the National Football League (NFL) during the 2000s. He played college football for the Florida Gators, and was recognized as a consensus All-American. He was selected by the Cincinnati Bengals in the second round of the 2004 NFL draft, and also played for the Tampa Bay Buccaneers, Indianapolis Colts and Pittsburgh Steelers of the NFL.

== Early life ==
Ratliff was born in Youngstown, Ohio in 1981. He attended Whitehall-Yearling High School in Whitehall, Ohio, and was a letterman in high school football and basketball for the Whitehall-Yearling Rams. Ratliff was a standout receiver on offense and cornerback on defense, he totaled forty-two catches for 760 yards and twelve touchdowns in 1997, and forty-six receptions for 880 yards and thirteen touchdowns in 1998. He was an all-state selection as a senior in 1998, and received high school All-America honors from Super Prep, Prep Star, and National Blue Chips.

== College career ==
Ratliff accepted an athletic scholarship to attend the University of Florida in Gainesville, Florida, where he played for coach Steve Spurrier and coach Ron Zook's Florida Gators football teams from 2000 to 2003. During his four-season college career with the Gators, he set school records for punt return yards (860), interceptions in a season (9), and interceptions in a single game (3). He was a first-team All-Southeastern Conference (SEC) selection in 2002 and 2003, and a consensus first-team All-American in 2003. As a senior team captain, he was recognized as the SEC Defensive Player of the Year by Sporting News, and was picked by his teammates as the Gators' most valuable player. Ratliff was inducted into the University of Florida Athletic Hall of Fame as a "Gator Great" in 2013.

== Professional career ==
=== Cincinnati Bengals (first stint) ===
The Cincinnati Bengals selected Ratliff in the second round (forty-ninth overall pick) in the 2004 NFL draft. He played for the Bengals for three seasons and part of a fourth, from 2004 to 2007. He played in fifty-one games for the Bengals, and started in eight. His most productive season was in 2005, when he intercepted three passes and recovered a fumble. Ratliff was a key player in the 2005 Bengals turn around, helping Cincinnati end their losing drought, by securing their first winning season in 15 years, going (11–5), and capturing the 2005 AFC North Division Championship.

On September 26, 2007, the Bengals released him.

=== Tampa Bay Buccaneers ===
Ratliff signed with the Tampa Bay Buccaneers on November 12, 2007, but was waived on November 28, 2007.

=== Indianapolis Colts ===
The Indianapolis Colts claimed Ratliff off waivers on November 29, 2007. He saw limited play with the team in the 2007 and 2008 seasons until he was cut by the Colts on September 20, 2008. He was re-signed on October 8, 2008, but waived again on October 22. He was once again re-signed on October 30 after cornerback Marlin Jackson was placed on injured reserve.

On December 18, 2008, Ratliff scored his first NFL career touchdown in a game against the Jacksonville Jaguars; he intercepted David Garrard and ran the ball 35 yards for the game-winning touchdown. That game would wind up clinching the playoffs for Indianapolis that year.

=== Pittsburgh Steelers ===
An unrestricted free agent in the 2009 offseason, Ratliff signed with the Pittsburgh Steelers on May 1, 2009. He was released on November 24.

=== Cincinnati Bengals (second stint) ===
Ratliff was re-signed by the Bengals prior to the playoffs on January 4, 2010, after defensive tackle Pat Sims was placed on injured reserve. He was released on June 18.

=== Florida Tuskers ===
Ratliff was signed by the Florida Tuskers of the United Football League on September 1, 2010.

=== Cincinnati Bengals (third stint) ===
Ratliff was re-signed and added to the 53-man active roster on December 15, 2010. The signing was a result of the team's injuries in the secondary, and Ratliff was a free agent after playing for the Florida Tuskers in the UFL.

=== Virginia Destroyers ===
Ratliff was added to the Destroyers' roster on September 9, 2011. He was placed on the injured reserve list on October 11.

== NFL career statistics ==
Legend
**Bold**	Career high

=== Regular season ===
Year	Team	Games		Tackles					Interceptions					Fumbles			
Year	Team	GP	GS	Cmb	Solo	Ast	Sck	TFL	Int	Yds	TD	Lng	PD	FF	FR	Yds	TD
2004	CIN	**16**	**5**	39	29	**10**	0.0	0	0	0	0	0	**5**	**1**	**3**	0	0
2005	CIN	**16**	3	**46**	**40**	6	0.0	**4**	**3**	**52**	0	**35**	3	**1**	1	0	0
2006	CIN	**16**	0	19	14	5	0.0	0	0	0	0	0	2	0	0	0	0
2007	CIN	3	0	1	1	0	0.0	0	0	0	0	0	0	0	0	0	0
2007	IND	1	0	2	2	0	0.0	0	0	0	0	0	0	0	0	0	0
2008	IND	13	4	32	27	5	0.0	1	2	37	**1**	**35**	**5**	0	1	0	0
2009	PIT	8	0	9	9	0	0.0	0	0	0	0	0	0	0	0	0	0
2010	CIN	3	0	13	7	6	0.0	0	0	0	0	0	0	0	0	0	0
		76	12	161	129	32	0.0	5	5	89	1	35	15	2	5	0	0

=== Playoffs ===
Year	Team	Games		Tackles					Interceptions					Fumbles			
Year	Team	GP	GS	Cmb	Solo	Ast	Sck	TFL	Int	Yds	TD	Lng	PD	FF	FR	Yds	TD
2008	IND	**1**	0	**6**	**5**	**1**	0.0	0	0	0	0	0	**1**	0	0	0	0
		1	0	6	5	1	0.0	0	0	0	0	0	1	0	0	0	0

== See also ==
- 2003 College Football All-America Team
- History of the Cincinnati Bengals
- List of Florida Gators football All-Americans
- List of Florida Gators in the NFL draft
- List of Pittsburgh Steelers players
- List of University of Florida Athletic Hall of Fame members
