= Keith Gatlin =

American basketball coach and player

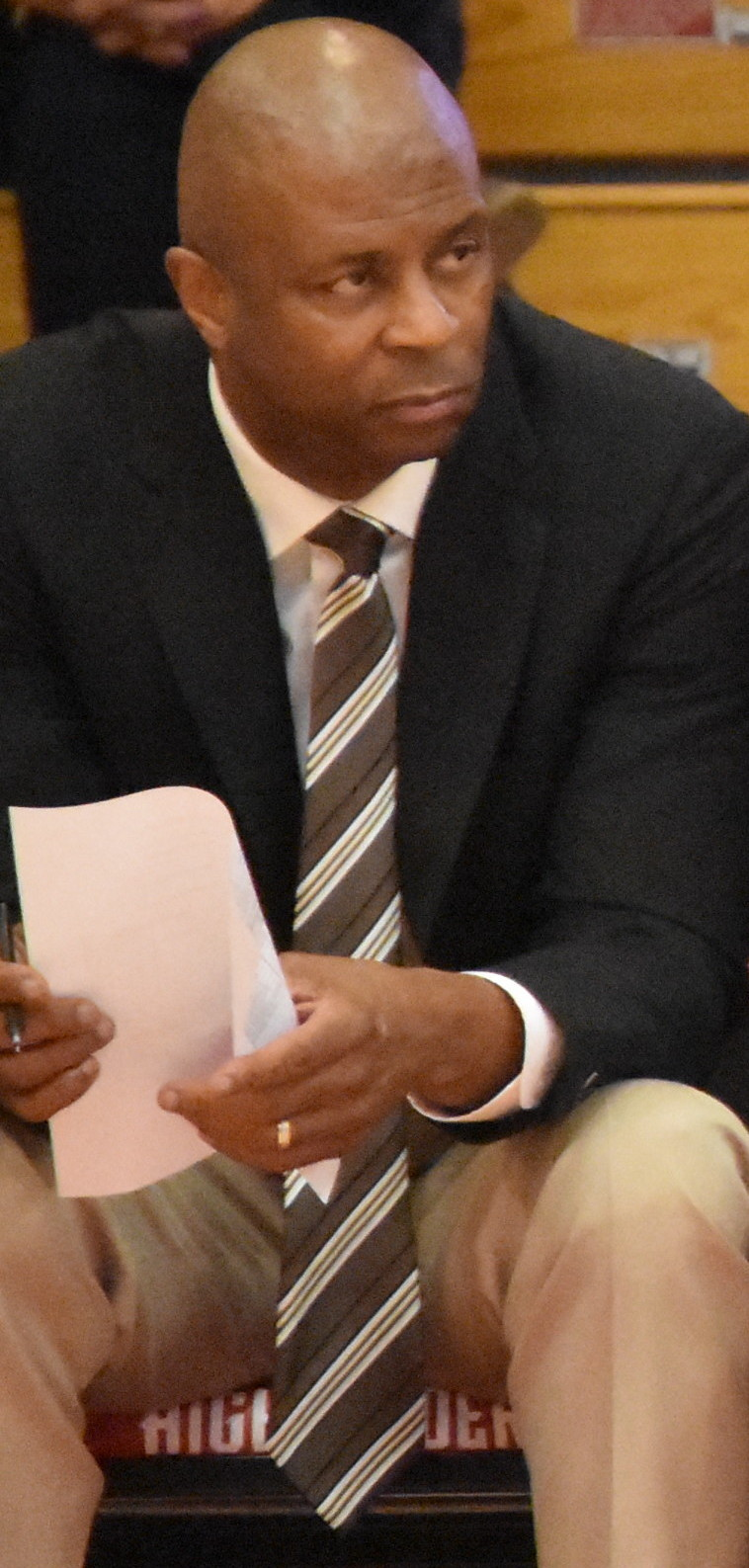
- Gatlin coaching High Point in 2020

Personal information
- Born: December 23, 1964 (age 61) Newark, New Jersey, U.S.
- Listed height: 6 ft 3.75 in (1.92 m)
- Listed weight: 170 lb (77 kg)

Career information
- High school: D. H. Conley (Greenville, North Carolina)
- College: Maryland (1983–1988)
- NBA draft: 1988: undrafted
- Playing career: 1988–2001
- Position: Point guard / shooting guard
- Coaching career: 2008–present

Career history

Playing
- 1988–1989: Tulsa Fast Breakers
- 1989: Worcester Counts
- 1989: Quad City Thunder
- 1989–1990: Pensacola Tornados
- 1990–1991: New Haven Skyhawks
- 1991–1992: Greensboro City Gaters
- 1993–1996: Brandt Hagen
- 1996–1997: Panionios
- 1997–1998: MTV Gießen
- 1998–2000: Élan Chalon
- 2000–2001: Al Riyadi Beirut

Coaching
- 2008–2009: Veritas Academy
- 2009–2018: Wesleyan Christian Academy
- 2018–2023: High Point (assistant)

Career highlights
- Greek League All-Star (1996 II); LNB Pro A All-Star (2000); BBL-Pokal winner (1994); Basketball Bundesliga Top Scorer (1998); BBL All-Star (1997); Second-team Parade All-American (1983); McDonald's All-American (1983)

Keith Larnell Gatlin (born December 23, 1964) is an American basketball coach and former professional player. He was one of the best players of the high school class of 1983, and committed to play college basketball for the Maryland Terrapins. After three seasons, Gatlin sat out one year during the 1986–87 season for academic reasons; he came back for his senior year in 1987–88. His 649 assists rank 3rd all-time for Maryland. After graduating from college, he went on to play professional basketball for 13 years, mainly in Europe: he led the German Bundesliga in scoring in the 1997–98 season and was named an All-Star in Greece, Germany, and France. After a 9-year experience as head coach of Wesleyan Christian Academy he was named assistant coach at High Point University.

== High school career ==
Gatlin was born in Newark, New Jersey but later moved to the state of North Carolina: he lived in Grimesland, North Carolina and attended D. H. Conley High School in Greenville. He soon entered the varsity basketball team, playing since 1980. Under coach Shelley Marsh he became the best player of the team, and in his junior year he averaged 22 points per game.

His senior year was his most successful: he averaged 25.2 points, 9.8 rebounds, 6.2 assists, 2 blocks and 2.5 steals. His team finished the season with a 22–4 record. Gatlin was considered one of the top guards of the 1983 class, and at the end of the year he was named the North Carolina player of the year, was selected in the Parade All-America Second Team and earned a spot in the McDonald's All-American Game. In the 1983 McDonald's All-American Boys Game he scored 8 points, shooting 3 for 6 from the field and 2 for 2 from the free throw line. He also played in the 1983 Capital Classic in Atlanta, Georgia where he scored 18 points on 5 for 12 shooting and 8 for 8 from the foul line.

In his career at Conley he scored 1,612 points, with a 56% field goal percentage and shooting 92% on free throws, and he also averaged at least 6 assists per game in each season he played.

== College career ==
Gatlin was heavily recruited during his high school career, and received offers from 210 colleges; he committed to Maryland in October 1982, choosing to major in radio and television. He chose to wear jersey number 3 and in his freshman year he started 9 games out of the 32 he played, averaging 6.2 points, 1.6 rebounds and 4.6 assists in 23.7 minutes per game: he recorded a season-high 19 points vs. Georgia Tech and 10 assists in the ACC championship final versus Duke, during which Maryland won the 1984 ACC men's basketball tournament. He ranked 6th in the ACC in assists, leading all freshmen in the conference.

In his sophomore season Gatlin was named a starter by coach Lefty Driesell, and he improved in all statistical categories: in 30.6 minutes per game he averaged 8.3 points, 1.9 rebounds and 6.0 assists. His 221 assists for the season were a new Maryland single-season record: during the game against Wake Forest on February 24, 1985 he surpassed former record holder John Lucas II, who had totalled 178 assists in the 1974–75 season. On January 30, 1985 vs Virginia he had 13 assists, which became the new single-game record for Maryland. On February 28, 1985 he scored a then career-high 28 points against Clemson with remarkable efficiency: he shot 14 for 15 from the field. He started 35 of his 37 games.

Gatlin returned his junior year with a more important role within the team, since coach Driesell believed he was one of the key players for Maryland. He averaged career-highs in points (10.2), rebounds (2.7) and assists (6.4); he had one of his best performances against North Carolina on February 20, 1986: in the final moments of the game, which went to overtime, he scored 2 free throws, securing Maryland's lead for a score of 75–72, and with 0:07 remaining he threw an inbound pass off the back of Kenny Smith, got the ball back and scored a layup, bringing the final score to 77–72.

After the death of Len Bias, which happened after the end of the 1985–86 season, the Maryland program was in turmoil and several players were suspended for skipping class and having poor grades: Gatlin was one of them. He was suspended for academic issues and missed the entire 1986–87 season, which was supposed to be his senior year in college basketball.

He came back to the team the following year, even though he had a smaller role: he became more of a scorer but his overall playing time decreased, and he started only 10 of 21 games. He averaged 12.2 points, 3.0 rebounds, 3.6 assists and 0.9 steals in 27 minutes per game. He was significantly efficient from the 3-point line, making 56 of his 113 attempts for a 49.6% shooting percentage.

In his 4 years at Maryland he averaged 8.9 points, 2.2 rebounds and 5.3 assists, with totals of 1,087 points and 649 assists. His 649 assists were an all-time record for Maryland at the time, and rank 3rd as of 2018.

=== College statistics ===
Year	Team	GP	GS	MPG	FG%	3P%	FT%	RPG	APG	SPG	BPG	PPG
1983–84	Maryland	32	9	23.7	.487	–	.762	1.6	4.6	0.6	0.0	6.2
1984–85	Maryland	37	35	30.6	.514	–	.862	1.9	6.0	0.7	0.1	8.3
1985–86	Maryland	32	30	33.2	.475	–	.784	2.7	6.4	0.8	0.2	10.2
1987–88	Maryland	21	10	27.0	.506	.496	.758	3.0	3.6	0.9	0.1	12.2
Career		122	84	28.9	.494	.496	.795	2.2	5.3	0.7	0.1	8.9

== Professional career ==
Gatlin was automatically eligible for the 1988 NBA draft, but he was not selected by an NBA team. He was drafted in the second round of the 1988 CBA draft (18th overall) by the Rockford Lightning. He played the 1988–89 CBA season with the Tulsa Fast Breakers and the Quad City Thunder: for Quad City he played 13 regular season games averaging 7.0 points, 2.5 rebounds and 3.8 assists and in 6 playoff games he averaged 7.7 points, 2.2 rebounds and 4.8 assists in 20.8 minutes per game.

He also joined the Worcester Counts in the World Basketball League; he then returned to the CBA and played again for the Quad City Thunder: in 5 games of the 1989–90 season he averaged 6.6 points, 1.4 rebounds and 5.8 assists He then finished the season with the Pensacola Tornados, and in 4 playoff games he posted averages of 8.8 points, 2.5 rebounds and 5.5 assists in 19.3 minutes per game.

In 1990 he joined the New Haven Skyhawks of the United States Basketball League, and he was free throw percentage leader with .899 in 1991. He then transferred to the Greensboro City Gaters of the Global Basketball Association for the 1991–92 season. In 1993 he moved to Europe and joined German club Brandt Hagen, where he played until 1996. After one season in Greece with Panionios, he went back to Germany, this time signing for MTV Gießen: he was the top scorer of the Bundesliga for the 1997–98 season, averaging 23.3 points per game. He was named an All-Star and he also won the 3-point shooting contest during the 1997 BBL All-Star Game. He scored a total of 2,761 points during his years in the Bundesliga.

After the successful year in Germany he moved to France, where he joined LNB Pro A team Élan Chalon: in 30 games played he averaged 18.8 points (3rd in the league) in 1998–99 on 54.9% shooting while also averaging 2.7 rebounds, 5.1 assists and 1.2 steals in 34.5 minutes per game. He was one of the best assistmen in the league in 1999–2000 with an average of 5.0 per game, and also recorded 15.9 points per game with a field goal percentage of 48.7% (90.3% from the free throw line), and added 3.2 rebounds and 0.9 steals in 33.9 minutes. These numbers earned him a selection in the All-Star team and in the All-Import 2nd team. He then ended his career after playing one year for Al Riyadi in Beirut, Lebanon.

== Coaching career ==
After retiring from professional basketball Gatlin started coaching, first as assistant coach at Greensboro Day School in Greensboro, North Carolina and in 2008 he was appointed as the head coach of Veritas Academy in Kernersville, North Carolina. He then transferred to Wesleyan Christian Academy in July 2009. During his time at Wesleyan he won two back-to-back NCISAA championships in 2013 and 2014; in July 2018 Tubby Smith chose him for the assistant coach position at High Point University.

== Bibliography ==
- McMullen, Paul (2002). Maryland Basketball: Tales from Cole Field House. JHU Press.
