= Whitehall, Ohio =

- City
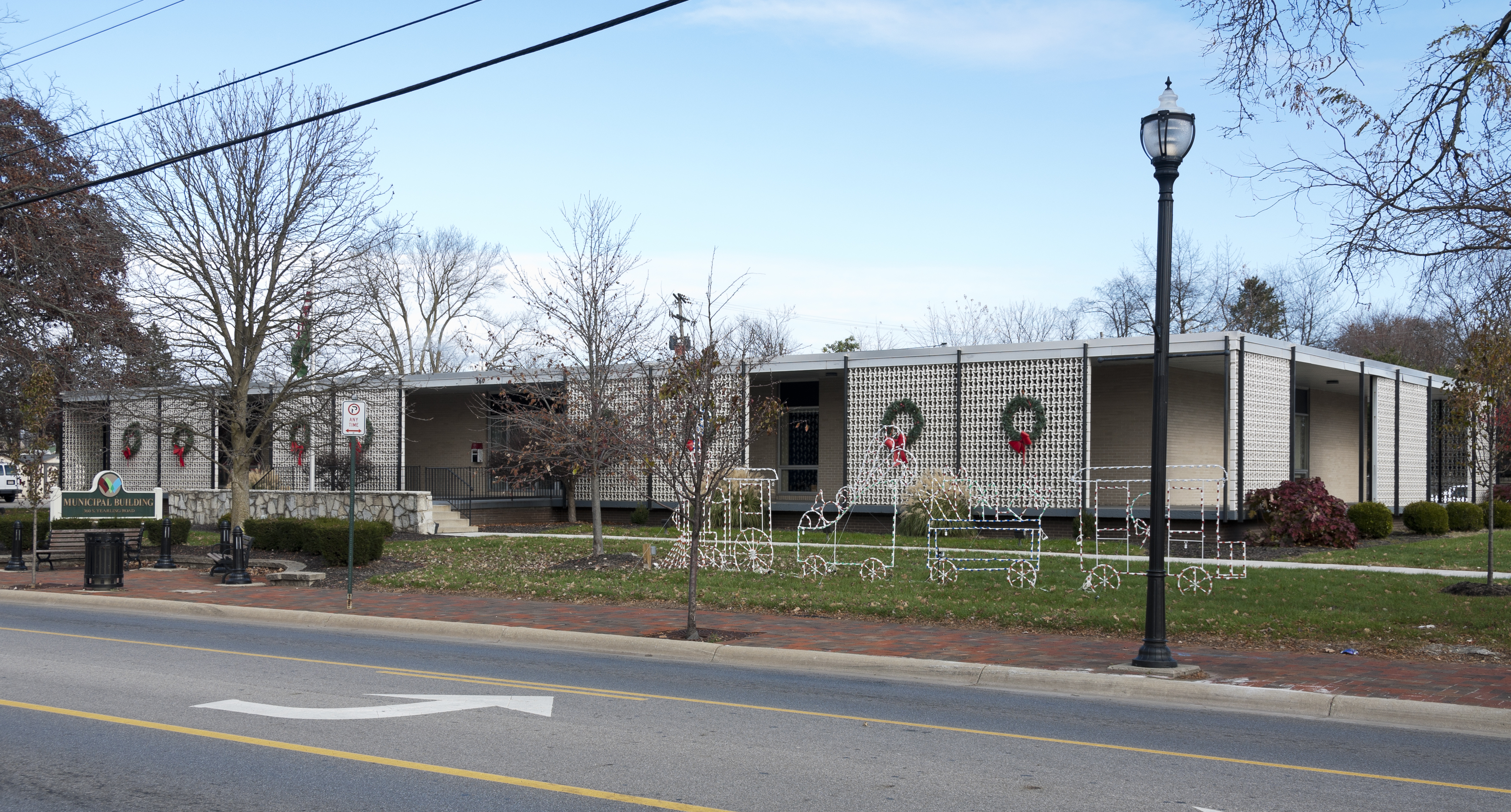
- Whitehall City Hall

- Flag Logo
- Motto: Opportunity is Here
- Interactive map of Whitehall, Ohio
- Location within Ohio Location within the United States
- Coordinates: 39°58′02″N 82°52′37″W
- Country: United States
- State: Ohio
- County: Franklin

Government
  - Mayor: Michael T. Bivens

Area
  - Total: 5.31 sq mi (13.74 km^{2})
  - Land: 5.28 sq mi (13.67 km^{2})
  - Water: 0.027 sq mi (0.07 km^{2})
- Elevation: 794 ft (242 m)

Population (2020)
  - Total: 20,127
  - Density: 3,813.2/sq mi (1,472.29/km^{2})
- Time zone: UTC-5 (Eastern (EST))
  - Summer (DST): UTC-4 (EDT)
- ZIP code: 43213
- Area codes: 614 and 380
- FIPS code: 39-84742
- GNIS feature ID: 1086119
- Website: https://www.whitehall-oh.us/

Whitehall is a city in Franklin County, Ohio, United States. Located 6 miles (9.7 km) east of the state capital of Columbus, Whitehall had a population of 20,127 in the 2020 census. Founded in 1947, Whitehall is a growing suburb of Columbus. Accrording to the U.S. Census Bureau, Whitehall's population is culturally and racially diverse, with over 50% of the population identifying as black, African American, Hispanic or Latino. A further 20% of its residents speak a language other than English at home.

== History ==
In the 1940s and 1950s, Whitehall still had working farms, and it was a mixed-income area with mainly small houses. It was still a village in the 1940s, and residents filed for incorporation in 1947. In 1952, the borders expanded east to the country club and Big Walnut Creek. Rapid growth meant that it became a city during the 1950s. The first shopping center strip in the country was built and opened in Whitehall in 1948, called Casto's Town and Country. The National Road passed through Whitehall.

In August 1970, two department stores in Whitehall were bombed as part of a robbery scheme.

== Geography ==
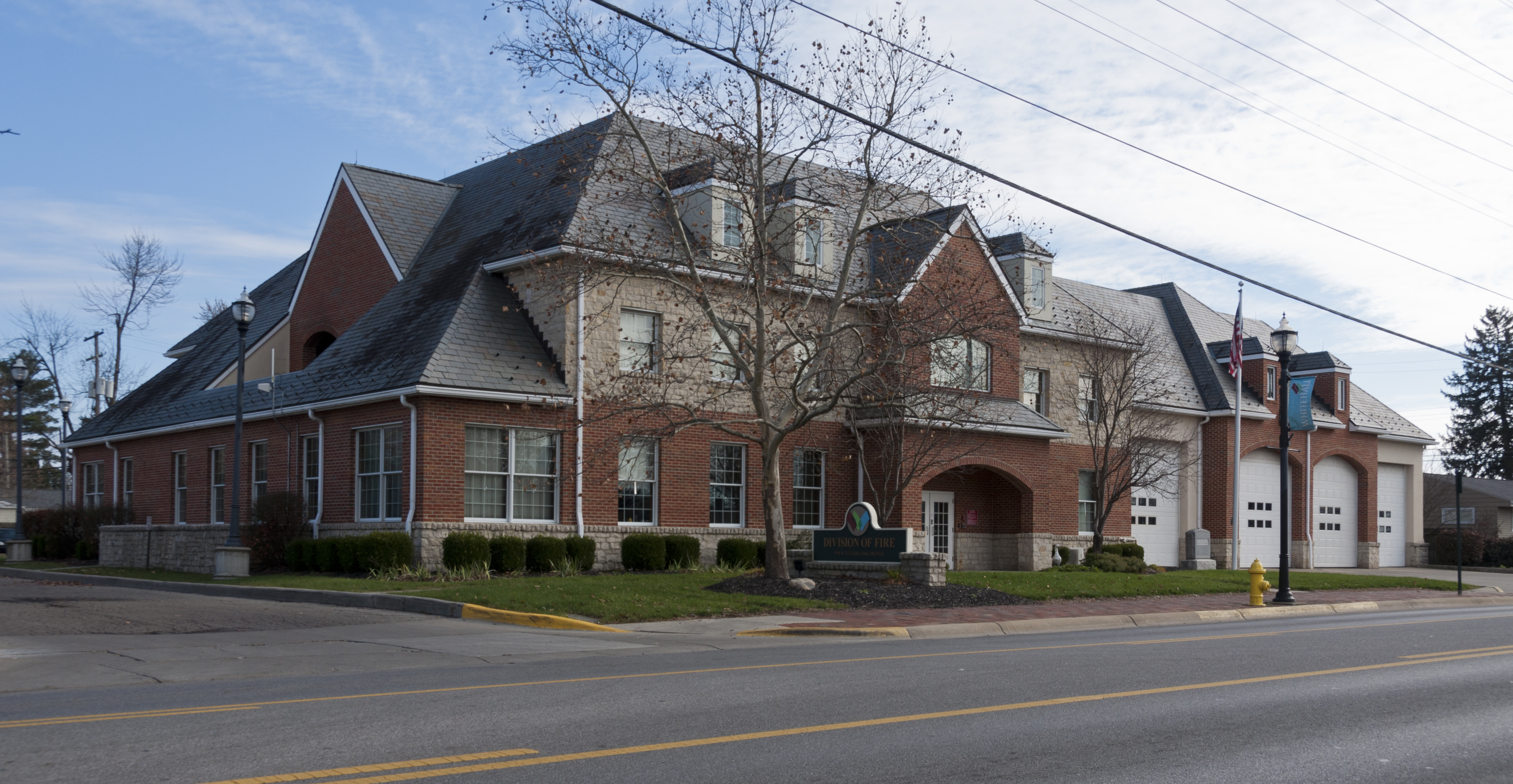
Whitehall Division of Fire Headquarters

According to the United States Census Bureau, the city has a total area of 5.29 square miles (13.70 km^{2}), of which 5.26 square miles (13.62 km^{2}) is land and 0.03 square miles (0.08 km^{2}) is water. Big Walnut Creek flows through Whitehall.

Like the nearby city of Bexley and villages of Minerva Park and Valleyview, Whitehall is an enclave of Columbus.

Whitehall is a suburban community of Columbus, Ohio in Franklin County. It is in close proximity to John Glenn Columbus International Airport. The 338th Army Band is stationed there at the Defense Supply Center, Columbus.

== Demographics ==
Historical population
| Census | Pop. | Note | %± |
|---|---|---|---|
| 1950 | 4,377 | | — |
| 1960 | 20,818 | | 375.6% |
| 1970 | 25,283 | | 21.4% |
| 1980 | 21,295 | | −15.8% |
| 1990 | 20,572 | | −3.4% |
| 2000 | 19,201 | | −6.7% |
| 2010 | 18,062 | | −5.9% |
| 2020 | 20,127 | | 11.4% |
Sources: 2020

=== 2020 census ===
As of the 2020 census, Whitehall had a population of 20,127. The median age was 34.6 years. 26.9% of residents were under the age of 18 and 13.1% of residents were 65 years of age or older. For every 100 females there were 93.5 males, and for every 100 females age 18 and over there were 88.5 males age 18 and over.

One hundred percent of residents lived in urban areas, while none lived in rural areas.

There were 8,018 households in Whitehall; 33.1% had children under the age of 18 living in them, 28.3% were married-couple households, 24.3% had a male householder with no spouse or partner present, and 37.8% had a female householder with no spouse or partner present. About 34.6% of all households were made up of individuals and 12.8% had someone living alone who was 65 years of age or older.

There were 8,479 housing units, of which 5.4% were vacant. The homeowner vacancy rate was 1.5% and the rental vacancy rate was 5.1%.

Racial composition as of the 2020 census
| Race | Number | Percent |
|---|---|---|
| White | 7,981 | 39.7% |
| Black or African American | 8,216 | 40.8% |
| American Indian and Alaska Native | 120 | 0.6% |
| Asian | 267 | 1.3% |
| Native Hawaiian and Other Pacific Islander | 11 | 0.1% |
| Some other race | 1,809 | 9.0% |
| Two or more races | 1,723 | 8.6% |
| Hispanic or Latino (of any race) | 2,793 | 13.9% |

=== 2010 census ===
As of the census of 2010, there were 18,062 people, 7,522 households, and 4,406 families living in the city. The population density was 3,433.8 inhabitants per square mile (1,325.8/km^{2}). There were 8,785 housing units at an average density of 1,670.2 per square mile (644.9/km^{2}). The racial makeup of the city was 58.8% White, 29.3% African American, 0.5% Native American, 1.5% Asian, 5.5% from other races, and 4.4% from two or more races. Hispanic or Latino of any race were 9.9% of the population.

There were 7,522 households, of which 32.6% had children under the age of 18 living with them, 31.8% were married couples living together, 19.3% had a female householder with no husband or wife present, 7.5% had a male householder with no wife or husband present, and 41.4% were non-families. 34.0% of all households were made up of individuals, and 9.4% had someone living alone who was 65 years of age or older. The average household size was 2.40 and the average family size was 3.07.

The median age in the city was 35 years. Residents under the age of 18 constitute 25.8% of the city's population; 9.2% were between the ages of 18 and 24; 28.4% were from 25 to 44; 25.5% were from 45 to 64; and 11.2% were 65 years of age or older. The gender makeup of the city was 48.6% male and 51.4% female.

=== 2000 census ===
As of the census of 2000, there were 19,201 people, 8,343 households, and 4,930 families living in the city. The population density was 3,681.9 inhabitants per square mile (1,421.6/km^{2}). There were 8,997 housing units at an average density of 1,725.2 per square mile (666.1/km^{2}). The racial makeup of the city was 74.40% White, 19.16% African American, 0.39% Native American, 2.04% Asian, 0.03% Pacific Islander, 1.21% from other races, and 2.78% from two or more races. Hispanic or Latino of any race were 2.95% of the population.

There were 8,343 households, out of which 29.1% had children under the age of 18 living with them, 37.3% were married couples living together, 16.3% had a female householder with no husband present, and 40.9% were non-families. 35.0% of all households were made up of individuals, and 9.3% had someone living alone who was 65 years of age or older. The average household size was 2.30 and the average family size was 2.96.

In the city the population was spread out, with 25.3% under the age of 18, 9.4% from 18 to 24, 32.2% from 25 to 44, 21.0% from 45 to 64, and 12.0% who were 65 years of age or older. The median age was 35 years. For every 100 females, there were 93.9 males. For every 100 females age 18 and over, there were 89.7 males.

The median income for a household in the city was $32,794, and the median income for a family was $37,296. Males had a median income of $30,896 versus $25,007 for females. The per capita income for the city was $16,867. About 11.1% of families and 14.9% of the population were below the poverty line, including 20.3% of those under age 18 and 12.4% of those age 65 or over.

== Economy ==
In recent years, Whitehall has experienced development and redevelopment within the community. More than $228 million of taxable income, payroll and business profit have been added since 2012, and there has been $65 million in private/public investment per square mile since 2010. In 2019, 41 new businesses opened, as well as Whitehall Community Park YMCA. In 2015 RiteRug Flooring relocated their headquarters, distribution center, and outlet to a 450,000 square-foot space in Whitehall. The Wasserstrom Company relocated to Whitehall in 2018. Its 50,000 square-foot headquarters houses 225 Wasserstrom employees. The headquarters office for DSW has been located next to the airport in Whitehall since 2007.

Mid-century era apartments were purchased in 2016 by the city and sold to a private developer to be turned into a $50 million new mixed-use development called Norton Crossing. Within that development will be The Lofts at Norton Crossing, 360 brand new luxury apartments near downtown Columbus, a restaurant, office and retail space. The first residents moved into the development in July 2020.

In 2019, the city acquired a 35-acre property known as Woodcliff Commons. The property will be developed into new commercial and office space, retail, restaurants and entertainment, integrated mobility, access and connectivity to greenspace, trails and Whitehall Community Park and hundreds of new residential units.

== Notable people ==
- Monica Day, television personality, 2007 Miss Ohio USA
- Domenik Hixon, NFL wide receiver
- Tina Maharath, Ohio State Senator
- Martin Nessley, NBA center
- Keiwan Ratliff, NFL cornerback
- Jason Thomas, September 11 attacks rescuer
